= Pensions Act 2014 =

Act of the Parliament of the United Kingdom

Pensions Act 2014 (Note: Section 57.)
- Act of Parliament
- Parliament of the United Kingdom
- Long title: An Act to make provision about pensions and about benefits payable to people in connection with bereavement; and for connected purposes.
- Citation: 2014 c. 19
- Introduced by: Iain Duncan Smith MP, Secretary of State for Work and Pensions (Commons); Lord Freud (Lords)
- Territorial extent: England and Wales; Scotland; Northern Ireland (part 7); (Note: Section 55.)

Dates
- Royal assent: 14 May 2014
- Commencement: Various (Note: Section 56.)
Other legislation
Amends	National Insurance Act 1965; Forfeiture Act 1982; Family Law (Scotland) Act 1985; Social Security Contributions and Benefits Act 1992; Social Security Administration Act 1992; Social Security Contributions and Benefits (Northern Ireland) Act 1992; Social Security Administration (Northern Ireland) Act 1992; Social Security Act 1993; Pension Schemes Act 1993; Pensions Act 1995; Employment Rights Act 1996; Social Security Act 1998; Welfare Reform and Pensions Act 1999; Financial Services and Markets Act 2000; Child Support, Pensions and Social Security Act 2000; Social Security Fraud Act 2001; State Pension Credit Act 2002; Employment Act 2002; Income Tax (Earnings and Pensions) Act 2003; Gender Recognition Act 2004; Pensions Act 2004; Companies (Audit, Investigations and Community Enterprise) Act 2004; Finance (No. 2) Act 2005; Companies Act 2006; Pensions Act 2007; Pensions Act 2008; Pensions Act 2011; Welfare Reform Act 2012; Public Service Pensions Act 2013; Marriage (Same Sex Couples) Act 2013
Amended by	Pension Schemes Act 2026

Status: Amended

Text of statute as originally enacted

Revised text of statute as amended

The Pensions Act 2014 is an act of the Parliament of the United Kingdom that received Royal Assent on 14 May 2014.

== Provisions ==
The act established a new state pension scheme for people who attain state pension age on or after 6 April 2016. The act requires that the pension age be reviewed in every term.

== Consequences ==
Due to the changes made by the act, women received slightly more money than before, and men received slightly less money.
