= List of statutory rules of Northern Ireland, 1994 =

This is an incomplete list of statutory rules of Northern Ireland in 1994.

== 1-100 ==
- Health and Safety (Training for Employment) Regulations (Northern Ireland) 1994 (S.R. 1994 No. 1)
- Disclosure of Interests in Shares (Amendment) Regulations (Northern Ireland) 1994 (S.R. 1994 No. 2)
- Redundancy Payments (Health and Personal Social Services) (Modification) Order (Northern Ireland) 1994 (S.R. 1994 No. 8)
- Pension Schemes (1993 Act) (Commencement No. 1) Order (Northern Ireland) 1994 (S.R. 1994 No. 17)
- Social Security (Adjudication) (Amendment) Regulations (Northern Ireland) 1994 (S.R. 1994 No. 21)
- Companies (1990 Order) (Commencement No. 5) Order (Northern Ireland) 1994 (S.R. 1994 No. 47)
- Fair Employment (Increase of Compensation Limit) Order (Northern Ireland) 1994 (S.R. 1994 No. 50)
- Health and Social Services Trusts (Consequential Amendments No. 2) Regulations (Northern Ireland) 1994 (S.R. 1994 No. 66)
- Social Security Benefits Up-rating Order (Northern Ireland) 1994 (S.R. 1994 No. 74)
- Social Security Benefits Up-rating Regulations (Northern Ireland) 1994 (S.R. 1994 No. 75)
- Social Security (Contributions) (Re-rating and Northern Ireland National Insurance Fund Payments) Order (Northern Ireland) 1994 (S.R. 1994 No. 79)
- Statutory Sick Pay (Rate of Payment) Order (Northern Ireland) 1994 (S.R. 1994 No. 82)
- Social Security Pensions (Home Responsibilities) Regulations (Northern Ireland) 1994 (S.R. 1994 No. 89)
- Social Security (Contributions) (Miscellaneous Amendments) Regulations (Northern Ireland 1994 (S.R. 1994 No. 94)

== 101-200 ==
- Alkali, &c. Works (Amendment) Order (Northern Ireland) 1994 (S.R. 1994 No. 104)
- Occupational Pension Schemes (Deficiency on Winding Up, etc.) Regulations (Northern Ireland) 1994 (S.R. 1994 No. 107)
- Partnerships and Unlimited Companies (Accounts) Regulations (Northern Ireland) 1994 (S.R. 1994 No. 133)
- Genetically Modified Organisms (1991 Order) (Commencement No. 1) Order (Northern Ireland) 1994 (S.R. 1994 No. 141)
- Access to Health Records (1993 Order) (Commencement) Order (Northern Ireland) 1994 (S.R. 1994 No. 151)
- Maternity Allowance and Statutory Maternity Pay Regulations (Northern Ireland) 1994 (S.R. 1994 No. 176)
- Alkali, &c. Works and Clean Air (Metrication) Regulations (Northern Ireland) 1994 (S.R. 1994 No. 192)
- Public Health (Metrication) Regulations (Northern Ireland) 1994 (S.R. 1994 No. 193)

== 201-300 ==
- Industrial Relations (1993 Order) (Commencement No. 2) Order (Northern Ireland) 1994 (S.R. 1994 No. 215)
- Social Security (Cyprus) Order (Northern Ireland) 1994 (S.R. 1994 No. 262)

== 301-400 ==
- Social Security (Industrial Injuries) (Prescribed Diseases) (Amendment) Regulations (Northern Ireland) 1994 (S.R. 1994 No. 347)
- Social Security (Severe Disablement Allowance and Invalid Care Allowance) (Amendment) Regulations (Northern Ireland) 1994 (S.R. 1994 No. 370)
- Social Security (Adjudication) (Amendment No. 3) Regulations (Northern Ireland) 1994 (S.R. 1994 No. 396)

== 401-500 ==
- Social Security (Jersey and Guernsey) Order (Northern Ireland) 1994 (S.R. 1994 No. 427)
- Companies (1986 Order) (Insurance Companies Accounts) Regulations (Northern Ireland) 1994 (S.R. 1994 No. 428)
- Insurance Accounts Directive (Miscellaneous Insurance Undertakings) Regulations (Northern Ireland) 1994 (S.R. 1994 No. 429)
- Criminal Justice (1994 Order) (Commencement) Order (Northern Ireland) 1994 (S.R. 1994 No. 446)
- Social Security (Incapacity for Work) (1994 Order) (Commencement) Order (Northern Ireland) 1994 (S.R. 1994 No. 450)
- Social Security (Incapacity Benefit) Regulations (Northern Ireland) 1994 (S.R. 1994 No. 461)
- Social Security (Severe Disablement Allowance) (Amendment) Regulations (Northern Ireland) 1994 (S.R. 1994 No. 462)
- Social Security (Incapacity Benefit — Increases for Dependants) Regulations (Northern Ireland) 1994 (S.R. 1994 No. 485)
- Industrial Relations (Deregulation and Contracting Out Act 1994) (Commencement) Order (Northern Ireland) 1994 (S.R. 1994 No. 488)
