= Social Security Contributions and Benefits (Northern Ireland) Act 1992 =

Act of the Parliament of the United Kingdom

Social Security Contributions and Benefits (Northern Ireland) Act 1992 (Note: Section 173(1).)
- Act of Parliament
- Parliament of the United Kingdom
- Long title: An Act to consolidate for Northern Ireland certain enactments relating to social security contributions and benefits, with corrections and minor improvements under the Consolidation of Enactments (Procedure) Act 1949.
- Citation: 1992 c. 7
- Territorial extent: Northern Ireland (Note: Section 116(2) and section 173 also extend to Great Britain. Section 173(5)–(6).)

Dates
- Royal assent: 13 February 1992
- Commencement: 1 July 1992 (Note: Section 173(4). Except as provided in Schedule 4 to the Social Security (Consequential Provisions) (Northern Ireland) Act 1992.)

Other legislation
- Amended by: List: Social Security (Contributions) (Northern Ireland) Order 1994; Statutory Sick Pay (Northern Ireland) Order 1994; Social Security (Incapacity for Work) (Northern Ireland) Order 1994; Children (Northern Ireland) Order 1995; Jobseekers (Northern Ireland) Order 1995; Polygamous Marriages (Northern Ireland) Order 1995; Pensions (Northern Ireland) Order 1995; Finance Act 1996; Asylum and Immigration Act 1996; Employment Rights (Northern Ireland) Order 1996; Social Security Administration (Fraud) (Northern Ireland) Order 1997; Social Security Act 1998; Petroleum Act 1998; Northern Ireland Act 1998; Criminal Justice (Children) (Northern Ireland) Order 1998; Social Security (Northern Ireland) Order 1998; Social Security Contributions (Transfer of Functions, etc.) Act 1999; Tax Credits Act 1999; Welfare Reform and Pensions Act 1999; Immigration and Asylum Act 1999; Social Security Benefits Up-rating Order (Northern Ireland) 1999; Social Security (Contributions) (Re-rating and Northern Ireland National Insurance Fund Payments) Order (Northern Ireland) 1999; Social Security (Industrial Injuries) (Dependency) (Permitted Earnings Limits) Order (Northern Ireland) 1999; Social Security (1998 Order) (Commencement No. 5) Order (Northern Ireland) 1999; Northern Ireland (Modification of Enactments—No. 1) Order 1999; Social Security Contributions (Transfer of Functions, etc.) (Northern Ireland) Order 1999; Welfare Reform and Pensions (Northern Ireland) Order 1999; Child Support, Pensions and Social Security Act 2000; Capital Allowances Act 2001; Social Security Act (Northern Ireland) 2002; State Pension Credit Act (Northern Ireland) 2002; National Insurance Contributions Act 2002; Tax Credits Act 2002; Employment Act 2002; Justice (Northern Ireland) Act 2002; Social Security Benefits Up-rating Order (Northern Ireland) 2002; Social Security (Contributions) (Re-rating and National Insurance Funds Payments) Order 2002; Housing Support Services (Northern Ireland) Order 2002; Income Tax (Earnings and Pensions) Act 2003; Finance Act 2003; Social Security Benefits Up-rating Order (Northern Ireland) 2003; Social Security (Contributions) (Re-rating and National Insurance Funds Payments) Order 2003; Social Security Contributions and Benefits (Northern Ireland) Act 1992 (Modification of Section 4A) Order 2003; National Insurance Contributions and Statutory Payments Act 2004; Finance Act 2004; Civil Partnership Act 2004; Social Security Benefits Up-rating Order (Northern Ireland) 2004; Social Security (Contributions) (Re-rating and National Insurance Funds Payments) Order 2004; Child Benefit and Guardian's Allowance Up-rating (Northern Ireland) Order 2004; Income Tax (Trading and Other Income) Act 2005; Child Benefit Act 2005; Commissioners for Revenue and Customs Act 2005; Social Security Benefits Up-rating Order (Northern Ireland) 2005; Social Security (Industrial Injuries) (Dependency) (Permitted Earnings Limits) Order (Northern Ireland) 2005; Pensions (Northern Ireland) Order 2005; Civil Partnership (Pensions and Benefit Payments) (Consequential, etc. Provisions) Order (Northern Ireland) 2005; Civil Partnership (Miscellaneous and Consequential Provisions) Order (Northern Ireland) 2005; Child Benefit and Guardian's Allowance Up-rating (Northern Ireland) Order 2005; Social Security (Contributions) (Re-rating and National Insurance Funds Payments) Order 2005; National Insurance Contributions Act 2006; Pensions (2004 Act and 2005 Order) (PPF Payments and FAS Payments) (Consequential Provisions) Order (Northern Ireland) 2006; Social Security Benefits Up-rating Order (Northern Ireland) 2006; Social Security (Industrial Injuries) (Dependency) (Permitted Earnings Limits) Order (Northern Ireland) 2006; Employment Equality (Age) Regulations (Northern Ireland) 2006; Social Security (Contributions) (Re-rating and National Insurance Funds Payments) Order 2006; Taxation of Pension Schemes (Consequential Amendments) Order 2006; Work and Families (Northern Ireland) Order 2006; Welfare Reform Act (Northern Ireland) 2007; Income Tax Act 2007; Pensions Act 2007; Social Security Benefits Up-rating Order (Northern Ireland) 2007; Social Security (Industrial Injuries) (Dependency) (Permitted Earnings Limits) Order (Northern Ireland) 2007; Employment Equality (Age) (Consequential Amendments) Regulations (Northern Ireland) 2007; Social Security Contributions and Benefits (Northern Ireland) Act 1992 (Modification of Section 10(7B)) Regulations 2007; Social Security (Contributions) (Re-rating and National Insurance Funds Payments) Order 2007; Guardian's Allowance Up-rating (Northern Ireland) Order 2007; Social Security Contributions and Benefits (Northern Ireland) Act 1992 (Modification of Section 4A) Order 2007; Pensions Act (Northern Ireland) 2008; Pensions (No. 2) Act (Northern Ireland) 2008; Health and Social Care Act 2008; National Insurance Contributions Act 2008; Pensions Act 2008; Social Security Benefits Up-rating Order (Northern Ireland) 2008; Social Security (Industrial Injuries) (Dependency) (Permitted Earnings Limits) Order (Northern Ireland) 2008; Employment and Support Allowance (Consequential Provisions) Regulations (Northern Ireland) 2008; Social Security (Contributions) (Re-rating) Order 2008; Guardian's Allowance Up-rating (Northern Ireland) Order 2008; Transfer of Tribunal Functions and Revenue and Customs Appeals Order 2009; Social Security Benefits Up-rating Order (Northern Ireland) 2009; Social Security (Industrial Injuries) (Dependency) (Permitted Earnings Limits) Order (Northern Ireland) 2009; Social Security (Contributions) (Re-rating) Order 2009; Guardian's Allowance Up-rating (Northern Ireland) Order 2009; Welfare Reform Act (Northern Ireland) 2010; Savings Accounts and Health in Pregnancy Grant Act 2010; Social Security Benefits Up-rating Order (Northern Ireland) 2010; Social Security (Industrial Injuries) (Dependency) (Permitted Earnings Limits) Order (Northern Ireland) 2010; Social Security (Miscellaneous Amendments No. 4) Regulations (Northern Ireland) 2010; National Insurance Contribution Credits (Transfer of Functions) (Northern Ireland) Order 2010; Income Tax Act 2007 (Amendment) Order 2010; Guardian's Allowance Up-rating (Northern Ireland) Order 2010; National Insurance Contributions Act 2011; Finance Act 2011; Social Security Benefits Up-rating Order (Northern Ireland) 2011; Social Security (Industrial Injuries) (Dependency) (Permitted Earnings Limits) Order (Northern Ireland) 2011; Social Security (Disability Living Allowance, Attendance Allowance and Carer's Allowance) (Miscellaneous Amendments) Regulations (Northern Ireland) 2011; Social Security (Contributions) (Re-rating) Order 2011; Guardian's Allowance Up-rating (Northern Ireland) Order 2011; Pensions Act (Northern Ireland) 2012; Finance Act 2012; Social Security Benefits Up-rating Order (Northern Ireland) 2012; Social Security (Industrial Injuries) (Dependency) (Permitted Earnings Limits) Order (Northern Ireland) 2012; Social Security (Contributions) (Re-rating) Order 2012; Guardian's Allowance Up-rating (Northern Ireland) Order 2012; Social Security Benefits Up-rating Order (Northern Ireland) 2013; Social Security (Contributions) (Re-rating) Order 2013; Guardian's Allowance Up-rating (Northern Ireland) Order 2013; Armed Forces and Reserve Forces (Compensation Scheme) (Consequential Provisions: Primary Legislation) (Northern Ireland) Order 2013; National Insurance Contributions Act 2014; Pensions Act 2014; Social Security Benefits Up-rating Order (Northern Ireland) 2014; Social Security (Maternity Allowance) (Participating Wife or Civil Partner of Self-employed Earner) Regulations (Northern Ireland) 2014; Guardian's Allowance Up-rating (Northern Ireland) Order 2014; Finance Act 2009, Sections 101 and 102 (Interest on Late Payments and Repayments) (Consequential Amendments) Order 2014; Social Security Class 3A Contributions (Amendment) Regulations 2014; Work and Families Act (Northern Ireland) 2015; Pensions Act (Northern Ireland) 2015; National Insurance Contributions Act 2015; Finance Act 2015; Social Security Benefits Up-rating Order (Northern Ireland) 2015; Pensions (2015 Act) (Consequential Amendments) (Units of Additional Pension) Order (Northern Ireland) 2015; Welfare Reform (Northern Ireland) Order 2015; Employment Act (Northern Ireland) 2016; Finance Act 2016; Departments (Transfer of Functions) Order (Northern Ireland) 2016; Pensions (2015 Act) (Consequential and Supplementary Amendments) Order (Northern Ireland) 2016; Social Security Benefits Up-rating Order (Northern Ireland) 2016; Personal Independence Payment (Supplementary Provisions and Consequential Amendments) Regulations (Northern Ireland) 2016; Universal Credit (Consequential, Supplementary, Incidental and Miscellaneous Provisions) Regulations (Northern Ireland) 2016; Social Security Benefits Up-rating Order (Northern Ireland) 2017; Social Security Benefits Up-rating (No. 2) Order (Northern Ireland) 2017; Tax Credits and Guardian's Allowance Up-rating etc. Regulations 2017; Social Security (Contributions) (Rates, Limits and Thresholds Amendments and National Insurance Funds Payments) Regulations 2017; Social Security (2017 Benefits Up-rating) Order (Northern Ireland) 2018; Social Security Benefits Up-rating Order (Northern Ireland) 2018; Social Security Benefits Up-rating (No. 2) Order (Northern Ireland) 2018; Social Security (Contributions) (Rates, Limits and Thresholds Amendments and National Insurance Funds Payments) Regulations 2018; Tax Credits and Guardian's Allowance Up-rating etc. Regulations 2018; Social Security (Updating of EU References) (Amendment) (Northern Ireland) Regulations 2018; Human Fertilisation and Embryology Act 2008 (Remedial) Order 2018; National Insurance Contributions (Termination Awards and Sporting Testimonials) Act 2019; Social Security (2018 Benefits Up-rating) Order (Northern Ireland) 2019; Social Security Benefits Up-rating Order (Northern Ireland) 2019; Social Security (Amendment) (Northern Ireland) (EU Exit) Regulations 2019; Social Security Benefits Up-rating (No. 2) Order (Northern Ireland) 2019; Tax Credits and Guardian's Allowance Up-rating Regulations 2019; Marriage (Same-sex Couples) and Civil Partnership (Opposite-sex Couples) (Northern Ireland) Regulations 2019; Coronavirus Act 2020; Social Security Benefits Up-rating Order (Northern Ireland) 2020; Marriage and Civil Partnership (Northern Ireland) (No. 2) Regulations 2020; Finance Act 2021; Social Security Benefits Up-rating Order (Northern Ireland) 2021; Social Security (Amendment) Regulations (Northern Ireland) 2021; Social Security (Scotland) Act 2018 (Disability Assistance for Children and Young People) (Consequential Modifications) (No. 2) Order 2021; Health and Social Care Act (Northern Ireland) 2022; Parental Bereavement (Leave and Pay) Act (Northern Ireland) 2022; Social Security (Terminal Illness) Act (Northern Ireland) 2022; Adoption and Children Act (Northern Ireland) 2022; Social Security Benefits Up-rating Order (Northern Ireland) 2022; Social Security (Scotland) Act 2018 (Disability Assistance and Information-Sharing) (Consequential Provision and Modifications) Order 2022; Social Security (Class 2 National Insurance Contributions Increase of Threshold) Regulations 2022; Social Security Benefits Up-rating Order (Northern Ireland) 2023; National Insurance Contributions (Reduction in Rates) Act 2023; Bereavement Benefits (Remedial) Order 2023; Carer's Assistance (Carer Support Payment) (Scotland) Regulations 2023 (Consequential Modifications) Order 2023; National Insurance Contributions (Reduction in Rates) Act 2024; Social Security (Class 2 National Insurance Contributions) (Consequential Amendments and Savings) Regulations 2024; Social Security (Scotland) Act 2018 (Disability Assistance) (Consequential Modifications) Order 2024; Employment Rights Act 2025; Social Security (Scotland) Act 2018 (Scottish Adult Disability Living Allowance) (Consequential Modifications) Order 2025; National Insurance Contributions (Employer Pensions Contributions) Act 2026; Social Security Benefits Up-rating Order (Northern Ireland) 2026; Social Security (Scotland) Act 2018 (Carer's Assistance) (Consequential Modifications) Order 2026; Social Security Contributions and Benefits (Northern Ireland) Act 1992 (Modification of Section 4A) Order 2026
- Relates to: Consolidation of Enactments (Procedure) Act 1949; Social Security Contributions and Benefits Act 1992; Social Security Administration Act 1992; Social Security (Consequential Provisions) Act 1992; Consolidation of Enactments (Procedure) Act 1949; Social Security Administration (Northern Ireland) Act 1992; Social Security (Consequential Provisions) (Northern Ireland) Act 1992

Status: Amended

Text of statute as originally enacted

Revised text of statute as amended

Text of the Social Security Contributions and Benefits (Northern Ireland) Act 1992 as in force today (including any amendments) within the United Kingdom, from legislation.gov.uk.

The Social Security Contributions and Benefits (Northern Ireland) Act 1992 (c. 7) is an act of the Parliament of the United Kingdom that consolidated for Northern Ireland certain enactments relating to social security contributions and benefits.

The enactments consolidated by the act were repealed, in consequence of the consolidation, by the Social Security (Consequential Provisions) (Northern Ireland) Act 1992.

The Social Security Contributions and Benefits Act 1992 made equivalent provisions for Great Britain.

== Provisions ==
The act is divided into thirteen parts. Part I (sections 1–19) deals with contributions, covering Class 1, 1A, 2, 3 and 4 national insurance contributions. Part II (sections 20–62) covers contributory benefits including unemployment benefit, sickness benefit, invalidity benefits, maternity allowance, benefits for widows and widowers, retirement pensions, and graduated retirement benefit. Part III (sections 63–79) covers non-contributory benefits including attendance allowance, severe disablement allowance, invalid care allowance, disability living allowance, guardian's allowance, and benefits for the aged. Part IV (sections 80–93) provides for increases of benefits for dependants. Part V (sections 94–111) deals with benefit for industrial injuries, including disablement pension and prescribed industrial diseases. Part VI (sections 112–121) contains miscellaneous provisions relating to Parts I to V. Part VII (sections 122–133) covers income-related benefits including income support, family credit, disability working allowance, and housing benefit. Part VIII (sections 134–136) governs the social fund. Part IX (sections 137–143) deals with child benefit. Part X (sections 144–146) provides for the Christmas bonus for pensioners. Part XI (sections 147–159) covers statutory sick pay. Part XII (sections 160–167) covers statutory maternity pay. Part XIII (sections 168–173) contains general provisions including interpretation, subordinate legislation, and the short title, commencement and extent of the act.

The act is accompanied by thirteen schedules dealing with supplementary provisions relating to contributions, the levy of Class 4 contributions with income tax, contribution conditions for entitlement to benefit, rates of benefits, increase of pension where entitlement is deferred, assessment of extent of disablement, industrial injuries benefits, industrial injuries and diseases in old cases, exclusions from entitlement to child benefit, priority between persons entitled to child benefit, circumstances in which periods of entitlement to statutory sick pay do not arise, and the relationship of statutory sick pay and statutory maternity pay with benefits and other payments.
