= Pension Schemes (Northern Ireland) Act 1993 =

Act of the Parliament of the United Kingdom

Pension Schemes (Northern Ireland) Act 1993 (Note: Section 186(1).)
- Act of Parliament
- Parliament of the United Kingdom
- Long title: An Act to consolidate for Northern Ireland certain enactments relating to pension schemes, with corrections and minor improvements under the Consolidation of Enactments (Procedure) Act 1949.
- Citation: 1993 c. 49
- Territorial extent: Northern Ireland (Note: Section 186(4)–(5).)

Dates
- Royal assent: 5 November 1993
- Commencement: 7 February 1994 (Note: Section 186(2)–(3). The Pension Schemes (1993 Act) (Commencement No. 1) Order (Northern Ireland) 1994 (SR 1994/17).)

Other legislation
- Amends: Social Security Administration Act 1992; See § Repealed enactments
- Repeals/revokes: See § Repealed enactments
- Amended by: Social Security (Incapacity for Work) (Northern Ireland) Order 1994; Pensions (Northern Ireland) Order 1995; Commissioner for Complaints (Northern Ireland) Order 1996; Ombudsman (Northern Ireland) Order 1996; Employment Rights (Northern Ireland) Order 1996; Industrial Tribunals (Northern Ireland) Order 1996; Social Security (Northern Ireland) Order 1998; Bank of England Act 1998; Northern Ireland Act 1998; Social Security Contributions (Transfer of Functions, etc.) (Northern Ireland) Order 1999; Welfare Reform and Pensions (Northern Ireland) Order 1999; Social Security Contributions (Transfer of Functions, etc.) Act 1999; Welfare Reform and Pensions Act 1999; Child Support, Pensions and Social Security Act (Northern Ireland) 2000; Child Support, Pensions and Social Security Act 2000; Financial Services and Markets Act 2000 (Consequential Amendments) Order 2002; State Pension Credit Act (Northern Ireland) 2002; National Insurance Contributions Act 2002; Proceeds of Crime Act 2002; Income Tax (Earnings and Pensions) Act 2003; Open-Ended Investment Companies Regulations (Northern Ireland) 2004; Finance Act 2004; Civil Partnership Act 2004; Pensions (Northern Ireland) Order 2005; Insolvency (Northern Ireland) Order 2005; Social Security Benefits Up-rating Order (Northern Ireland) 2005; Civil Partnership (Contracted-out Occupational and Appropriate Personal Pension Schemes) (Surviving Civil Partners) Order (Northern Ireland) 2005; Civil Partnership (Pensions and Benefit Payments) (Consequential, etc. Provisions) Order (Northern Ireland) 2005; Pensions Ombudsman (Disclosure of Information) (Amendment of Specified Persons) Order (Northern Ireland) 2005; Income Tax (Trading and Other Income) Act 2005; Commissioners for Revenue and Customs Act 2005; Taxation of Pension Schemes (Consequential Amendments) Order 2006; Social Security (Reduced Rates of Class 1 Contributions, Rebates and Minimum Contributions) Order 2006; Social Security Benefits Up-rating Order (Northern Ireland) 2006; Social Security Benefits Up-rating Order (Northern Ireland) 2007; Occupational Pension Schemes (EEA States) Regulations (Northern Ireland) 2007; Welfare Reform Act (Northern Ireland) 2007; Finance Act 2007; Companies Act 2006 (Consequential Amendments etc) Order 2008; Social Security Benefits Up-rating Order (Northern Ireland) 2008; Pensions Act (Northern Ireland) 2008; Pensions (No. 2) Act (Northern Ireland) 2008; Companies Act 2006 (Consequential Amendments, Transitional Provisions and Savings) Order 2009; Social Security Benefits Up-rating Order (Northern Ireland) 2009; Social Security Benefits Up-rating Order (Northern Ireland) 2010; Pensions Regulator Tribunal (Transfer of Functions) Act (Northern Ireland) 2010; Social Security (Reduced Rates of Class 1 Contributions, Rebates and Minimum Contributions) Order 2011; Social Security Benefits Up-rating Order (Northern Ireland) 2011; Social Security Benefits Up-rating Order (Northern Ireland) 2012; Pensions (2008 No. 2 Act) (Abolition of Protected Rights) (Consequential Provisions) Order (Northern Ireland) 2012; Pensions Act (Northern Ireland) 2012; Financial Services and Markets Act 2000 (Over the Counter Derivatives, Central Counterparties and Trade Repositories) Regulations 2013; Social Security Benefits Up-rating Order (Northern Ireland) 2013; Social Security Benefits Up-rating Order (Northern Ireland) 2014; Pensions (2012 Act) (Consequential and Supplementary Provisions) Regulations (Northern Ireland) 2014; Public Service Pensions Act (Northern Ireland) 2014; National Insurance Contributions Act 2014; Social Security Benefits Up-rating Order (Northern Ireland) 2015; Pensions (2015 Act) (Consequential Amendments) (Units of Additional Pension) Order (Northern Ireland) 2015; Pensions Act (Northern Ireland) 2015; Pension Schemes Act 2015; Pension Schemes Act (Northern Ireland) 2016; Bank of England and Financial Services (Consequential Amendments) Regulations 2017; Central Securities Depositories Regulations 2017; Social Security Benefits Up-rating Order (Northern Ireland) 2017; Social Security Benefits Up-rating (No. 2) Order (Northern Ireland) 2017; Social Security (2017 Benefits Up-rating) Order (Northern Ireland) 2018; Social Security Benefits Up-rating Order (Northern Ireland) 2018; Social Security Benefits Up-rating (No. 2) Order (Northern Ireland) 2018; Financial Guidance and Claims Act 2018; Insolvency (Amendment) (EU Exit) Regulations 2019; Occupational and Personal Pension Schemes (Amendment etc.) (Northern Ireland) (EU Exit) Regulations 2019; Financial Guidance and Claims Act 2018 (Naming and Consequential Amendments) Regulations 2019; Marriage (Same-sex Couples) and Civil Partnership (Opposite-sex Couples) (Northern Ireland) Regulations 2019; Social Security (2018 Benefits Up-rating) Order (Northern Ireland) 2019; Social Security Benefits Up-rating Order (Northern Ireland) 2019; Social Security Benefits Up-rating (No. 2) Order (Northern Ireland) 2019; Marriage and Civil Partnership (Northern Ireland) (No. 2) Regulations 2020; Seafarers (Collective Redundancies, Information and Consultation and Insolvency Miscellaneous Amendments) Regulations (Northern Ireland) 2020; Social Security Benefits Up-rating Order (Northern Ireland) 2020; Social Security Benefits Up-rating Order (Northern Ireland) 2021; Pension Schemes Act 2021; Pension Schemes Act (Northern Ireland) 2021; Social Security Benefits Up-rating Order (Northern Ireland) 2022; Pension Schemes (Conversion of Guaranteed Minimum Pensions) Act 2022; Social Security (2022 Benefits Up-rating) Order (Northern Ireland) 2023; Social Security Benefits Up-rating (No. 2) Order (Northern Ireland) 2023; Social Security Benefits Up-rating (No. 3) Order (Northern Ireland) 2023; Social Security Benefits Up-rating Order (Northern Ireland) 2026

Status: Amended

Text of statute as originally enacted

Revised text of statute as amended

Text of the Pension Schemes (Northern Ireland) Act 1993 as in force today (including any amendments) within the United Kingdom, from legislation.gov.uk.

The Pension Schemes (Northern Ireland) Act 1993 (c. 49) is an act of the Parliament of the United Kingdom that consolidated enactments relating to pension schemes in Northern Ireland.

== Provisions ==
=== Repealed enactments ===
Sections 182(1) and (2) of the act repealed 30 enactments and revoked 6 instruments, listed in parts I and II, and part III of schedule 4 to the act, respectively.

General
Citation	Short title	Extent of repeal
1973 c. 38	Social Security Act 1973	Section 89.
1975 c. 18	Social Security (Consequential Provisions) Act 1975	In Schedule 2, paragraph 58.
1975 c. 60	Social Security Pensions Act 1975	Section 57.
1975 c. 60	Social Security Pensions Act 1975	In Schedule 4, paragraph 30.
SI 1975/1503 (N.I. 15)	Social Security Pensions (Northern Ireland) Order 1975	In Article 2, in paragraph (2), the definitions of "appropriate scheme", "Contributions and Benefits Act", "the Department", "government department", "guaranteed minimum pension", "the Inland Revenue", "linked qualifying service", "minimum payments", "money purchase benefits", "money purchase contracted-out scheme", "normal pension age", "Occupational Pensions Board", "occupational pension scheme", "personal pension scheme", "protected rights", "public service pension scheme", "qualifying earnings factor", "resources" and "rights" and paragraphs (3) to (5) and (7).
SI 1975/1503 (N.I. 15)	Social Security Pensions (Northern Ireland) Order 1975	Articles 28 to 38.
SI 1975/1503 (N.I. 15)	Social Security Pensions (Northern Ireland) Order 1975	Articles 39A to 53D.
SI 1975/1503 (N.I. 15)	Social Security Pensions (Northern Ireland) Order 1975	Articles 55 to 58A.
SI 1975/1503 (N.I. 15)	Social Security Pensions (Northern Ireland) Order 1975	Articles 58E and 58K.
SI 1975/1503 (N.I. 15)	Social Security Pensions (Northern Ireland) Order 1975	Articles 58M to 65.
SI 1975/1503 (N.I. 15)	Social Security Pensions (Northern Ireland) Order 1975	Articles 67 to 68B.
SI 1975/1503 (N.I. 15)	Social Security Pensions (Northern Ireland) Order 1975	Articles 69B to 73.
SI 1975/1503 (N.I. 15)	Social Security Pensions (Northern Ireland) Order 1975	Schedules 1A to 4A.
SI 1975/1503 (N.I. 15)	Social Security Pensions (Northern Ireland) Order 1975	In Schedule 5, paragraph 14.
SI 1976/1043 (N.I. 16)	Industrial Relations (Northern Ireland) Order 1976	Article 43.
SI 1976/1043 (N.I. 16)	Industrial Relations (Northern Ireland) Order 1976	In Article 44, paragraph (2) and in paragraph (3), the words "or 43".
SI 1976/1043 (N.I. 16)	Industrial Relations (Northern Ireland) Order 1976	Article 45(3) to (3C).
SI 1976/1043 (N.I. 16)	Industrial Relations (Northern Ireland) Order 1976	In Article 46(1), the words "or 43" and "or contributions to an occupational pension scheme or a personal pension scheme falling to be made".
SI 1976/1043 (N.I. 16)	Industrial Relations (Northern Ireland) Order 1976	In Article 47(2), the definitions of "occupational pension scheme" and "personal pension scheme" and the words from "and any reference" onwards.
SI 1976/1043 (N.I. 16)	Industrial Relations (Northern Ireland) Order 1976	In Article 76, in paragraph (2A), the words "and 43" and in paragraph (7), the words "43".
SI 1977/610 (N.I. 11)	Social Security (Miscellaneous Provisions) (Northern Ireland) Order 1977	In Article 2(2), the definitions of "modifications" and "the Pensions Order".
SI 1977/610 (N.I. 11)	Social Security (Miscellaneous Provisions) (Northern Ireland) Order 1977	Article 4(2).
SI 1977/610 (N.I. 11)	Social Security (Miscellaneous Provisions) (Northern Ireland) Order 1977	Article 17.
SI 1977/610 (N.I. 11)	Social Security (Miscellaneous Provisions) (Northern Ireland) Order 1977	Article 18(7), (8), (13), (14) and (18).
SI 1977/610 (N.I. 11)	Social Security (Miscellaneous Provisions) (Northern Ireland) Order 1977	Article 20.
SI 1979/396 (N.I. 5)	Social Security (Northern Ireland) Order 1979	Article 14.
SI 1979/396 (N.I. 5)	Social Security (Northern Ireland) Order 1979	In Schedule 3, paragraphs 14 and 19.
SI 1980/870 (N.I. 8)	Social Security (Northern Ireland) Order 1980	Article 4(3), (6) to (9) and (11).
SI 1980/870 (N.I. 8)	Social Security (Northern Ireland) Order 1980	Article 5(1).
SI 1980/870 (N.I. 8)	Social Security (Northern Ireland) Order 1980	In Schedule 3, paragraph 9.
SI 1982/1084 (N.I. 16)	Social Security (Northern Ireland) Order 1982	Article 33.
SI 1982/1084 (N.I. 16)	Social Security (Northern Ireland) Order 1982	In Schedule 4, paragraph 13.
SI 1984/1158 (N.I. 8)	Health and Social Security (Northern Ireland) Order 1984	Articles 13 and 14.
SI 1984/1158 (N.I. 8)	Health and Social Security (Northern Ireland) Order 1984	Schedule 4.
SI 1984/1158 (N.I. 8)	Health and Social Security (Northern Ireland) Order 1984	In Schedule 5, paragraphs 3(a), 5 and 6.
1985 c. 53	Social Security Act 1985	In Schedule 5, paragraph 2.
SI 1985/1209 (N.I. 16)	Social Security (Northern Ireland) Order 1985	Articles 3 to 8.
SI 1985/1209 (N.I. 16)	Social Security (Northern Ireland) Order 1985	Schedules 1 to 3.
SI 1985/1209 (N.I. 16)	Social Security (Northern Ireland) Order 1985	In Schedule 5, paragraphs 9, 10, 12, 13, 15 to 28.
SI 1986/1888 (N.I. 18)	Social Security (Northern Ireland) Order 1986	In Article 2, in paragraph (2), the definitions of "average salary benefits", "contract of service", "employed earner", "employee", "employer", "insurance company", "minimum contributions", "money purchase benefits", "occupational pension scheme", "personal pension scheme", "protected rights", "tax-exemption", "tax-approval" and "tax year" and paragraphs (3) and (4).
SI 1986/1888 (N.I. 18)	Social Security (Northern Ireland) Order 1986	Articles 3 to 10.
SI 1986/1888 (N.I. 18)	Social Security (Northern Ireland) Order 1986	Article 11(1) to (7).
SI 1986/1888 (N.I. 18)	Social Security (Northern Ireland) Order 1986	Articles 12 to 18A.
SI 1986/1888 (N.I. 18)	Social Security (Northern Ireland) Order 1986	Article 53(1) and (2).
SI 1986/1888 (N.I. 18)	Social Security (Northern Ireland) Order 1986	Article 60.
SI 1986/1888 (N.I. 18)	Social Security (Northern Ireland) Order 1986	Article 76.
SI 1986/1888 (N.I. 18)	Social Security (Northern Ireland) Order 1986	Article 79(1), (2) and (6).
SI 1986/1888 (N.I. 18)	Social Security (Northern Ireland) Order 1986	Article 80.
SI 1986/1888 (N.I. 18)	Social Security (Northern Ireland) Order 1986	In Article 81, paragraph (3), in paragraph (4) the words "those to which paragraph (3) applies and", and paragraph (8).
SI 1986/1888 (N.I. 18)	Social Security (Northern Ireland) Order 1986	Article 82(1)(a) and (b), (3) and (4).
SI 1986/1888 (N.I. 18)	Social Security (Northern Ireland) Order 1986	Schedules 1 and 2.
SI 1986/1888 (N.I. 18)	Social Security (Northern Ireland) Order 1986	In Schedule 5, paragraph 18 and in Part II, paragraph (a).
SI 1986/1888 (N.I. 18)	Social Security (Northern Ireland) Order 1986	In Schedule 8, paragraphs 6 to 9.
SI 1986/1888 (N.I. 18)	Social Security (Northern Ireland) Order 1986	In Schedule 9, paragraphs 2 to 26, 47 and 77.
SI 1988/594 (N.I. 2)	Social Security (Northern Ireland) Order 1988	Article 10.
SI 1988/594 (N.I. 2)	Social Security (Northern Ireland) Order 1988	In Schedule 2, paragraphs 1(2) and (3), 2 and 3.
1989 c. 6	Official Secrets Act 1989	In Schedule 1, paragraph 1(g).
SI 1989/1342 (N.I. 13)	Social Security (Northern Ireland) Order 1989	Article 22.
SI 1989/1342 (N.I. 13)	Social Security (Northern Ireland) Order 1989	Article 27.
SI 1989/1342 (N.I. 13)	Social Security (Northern Ireland) Order 1989	In Schedule 1, paragraph 11.
SI 1989/1342 (N.I. 13)	Social Security (Northern Ireland) Order 1989	In Schedule 6, paragraphs 1 to 17.
SI 1989/1342 (N.I. 13)	Social Security (Northern Ireland) Order 1989	In Schedule 7, paragraph 18.
SI 1989/1342 (N.I. 13)	Social Security (Northern Ireland) Order 1989	In Schedule 8, paragraph 12.
SI 1989/2405 (N.I. 19)	Insolvency (Northern Ireland) Order 1989	In Schedule 9, paragraphs 86 and 89.
1990 c. 41	Courts and Legal Services Act 1990	Section 82(3).
SI 1990/246 (N.I. 2)	Employment (Miscellaneous Provisions) (Northern Ireland) Order 1990	Articles 16(3) and 17(2).
SI 1990/1511 (N.I. 15)	Social Security (Northern Ireland) Order 1990	Articles 13 to 15, 16(2), 21(1) and 22(5).
SI 1990/1511 (N.I. 15)	Social Security (Northern Ireland) Order 1990	Schedules 2 to 4.
SI 1991/196 (N.I. 2)	Redundancy Fund (Abolition) (Northern Ireland) Order 1991	In Schedule 1, in the amendment of the Industrial Relations (Northern Ireland) Order 1976, the words "43(1)".
SI 1991/765 (N.I. 9)	Statutory Sick Pay (Northern Ireland) Order 1991	Article 5(1)(d).
SI 1991/2631 (N.I. 24)	Judicial Pensions (Northern Ireland) Order 1991	Article 6(3).
1992 c. 8	Social Security Administration (Northern Ireland) Act 1992	Section 149(5)(c), and the word "and" preceding it.
1992 c. 9	Social Security (Consequential Provisions) (Northern Ireland) Act 1992	In Schedule 2, paragraphs 14(2)(b), (3) to (18), (20) to (26), 16(2), 17(1), (2) and (4), 31(2) and (3) and 32(2) to (4) and (7), (8) and (11).
1992 c. 40	Friendly Societies Act 1992	In Schedule 2, paragraphs 22 and 23.
SI 1992/907 (N.I. 5)	Industrial Relations (Northern Ireland) Order 1992	In Schedule 5, paragraph 1.
1993 c. 8	Judicial Pensions and Retirement Act 1993	In Schedule 8, paragraphs 13 and 19.
SI 1993/592 (N.I. 2)	Social Security (Northern Ireland) Order 1993	In Article 1, in paragraph (3), the words "Article 3(1) and (2) and", and paragraph (4).
SI 1993/592 (N.I. 2)	Social Security (Northern Ireland) Order 1993	Article 3.

Provisions Relating to Equal Access
Citation	Short title	Extent of repeal
1993 c. 48	Pension Schemes Act 1993 (Note: The schedule describes this enactment as "The Pension Schemes (Northern Ireland) Act 1993", but this appears to be in error: 1993 c. 48 is the Pension Schemes Act 1993, the Great Britain equivalent; the Pension Schemes (Northern Ireland) Act 1993 is chapter 49.)	Section 114.
1993 c. 48	Pension Schemes Act 1993	In section 128, the words ", the equal access requirements".
1993 c. 48	Pension Schemes Act 1993	In section 129(1), the words ", the equal access requirements".
1993 c. 48	Pension Schemes Act 1993	In section 130, in subsection (3), the words ", the equal access requirements" and in subsection (4) the words "or the equal access requirements" and the words from "or as the case may be" onwards.
1993 c. 48	Pension Schemes Act 1993	In section 132(2)(e)(iv), the words "or the equal access requirements".
1993 c. 48	Pension Schemes Act 1993	In section 135(2), the words ", the equal access requirements".
1993 c. 48	Pension Schemes Act 1993	In section 136(4), paragraph (c) and the word "and" immediately preceding it.
1993 c. 48	Pension Schemes Act 1993	Section 149(3) and (4).
1993 c. 48	Pension Schemes Act 1993	Section 165(5) and (6).
1993 c. 48	Pension Schemes Act 1993	In section 176(1), the definition of "the equal access requirements".

Subordinate Legislation Revoked
Citation	Short title	Extent of revocation
SR 1987/294	Personal and Occupational Pension Schemes (Modification of Enactments) Regulations (Northern Ireland) 1987	All the Regulations.
SR 1988/107	Personal and Occupational Pension Schemes (Tax Approval and Miscellaneous Provisions) Regulations (Northern Ireland) 1988	Regulation 8.
SR 1988/214	Personal and Occupational Pension Schemes (Transfer to Self-employed Pension Arrangements) Regulations (Northern Ireland) 1988	Regulation 4(2).
SR 1989/105	Personal and Occupational Pension Schemes (Miscellaneous Amendments) Regulations (Northern Ireland) 1989	Regulation 3.
SR 1990/203	Personal and Occupational Pension Schemes (Miscellaneous Amendments) Regulations (Northern Ireland) 1990	Regulation 9.
SR 1992/142	Social Security (Class 1 Contributions - Contracted-out Percentages) Order (Northern Ireland) 1992	The whole order.
