= Social Security Administration (Northern Ireland) Act 1992 =

Act of the Parliament of the United Kingdom

Social Security Administration (Northern Ireland) Act 1992 (Note: Section 168(1).)
- Act of Parliament
- Parliament of the United Kingdom
- Long title: An Act to consolidate for Northern Ireland certain enactments relating to the administration of social security and related matters, with corrections and minor improvements under the Consolidation of Enactments (Procedure) Act 1949.
- Citation: 1992 c. 8
- Territorial extent: Northern Ireland (Note: Section 168(5). Sections 22 and 168 of the act also extend to Great Britain (section 168(6)).)

Dates
- Royal assent: 13 February 1992
- Commencement: 1 July 1992 (Note: Section 168(4), except as provided in schedule 4 to the Social Security (Consequential Provisions) (Northern Ireland) Act 1992.)

Other legislation
- Amended by: List: Deregulation and Contracting Out Act 1994; Social Security (Contributions) (Northern Ireland) Order 1994; Statutory Sick Pay (Northern Ireland) Order 1994; Social Security (Incapacity for Work) (Northern Ireland) Order 1994; Children (Northern Ireland) Order 1995; Child Support (Northern Ireland) Order 1995; Jobseekers (Northern Ireland) Order 1995; Pensions (Northern Ireland) Order 1995; Arbitration Act 1996; Social Security (Overpayments) Act 1996; Deregulation and Contracting Out (Northern Ireland) Order 1996; Industrial Tribunals (Northern Ireland) Order 1996; Housing Benefit (Payment to Third Parties) (Northern Ireland) Order 1996; Social Security Administration (Fraud) Act 1997; Social Security Administration (Fraud) (Northern Ireland) Order 1997; Social Security (Recovery of Benefits) (Northern Ireland) Order 1997; Northern Ireland Act 1998; Social Security (Northern Ireland) Order 1998; Tax Credits Act 1999; Welfare Reform and Pensions Act 1999; Northern Ireland (Modification of Enactments—No. 1) Order 1999; Social Security Contributions (Transfer of Functions, etc.) (Northern Ireland) Order 1999; Scotland Act 1998 (Consequential Modifications) (No.2) Order 1999; Welfare Reform and Pensions (Northern Ireland) Order 1999; Child Support, Pensions and Social Security Act (Northern Ireland) 2000; Child Support, Pensions and Social Security Act 2000; Social Security Fraud Act 2001; Social Security Act (Northern Ireland) 2002; State Pension Credit Act (Northern Ireland) 2002; National Insurance Contributions Act 2002; Tax Credits Act 2002; Employment Act 2002; Justice (Northern Ireland) Act 2002; Financial Services and Markets Act 2000 (Consequential Amendments) Order 2002; Income Tax (Earnings and Pensions) Act 2003; Audit and Accountability (Northern Ireland) Order 2003; Access to Justice (Northern Ireland) Order 2003; National Insurance Contributions and Statutory Payments Act 2004; Civil Partnership Act 2004; Scottish Public Services Ombudsman Act 2002 (Consequential Provisions and Modifications) Order 2004; Age-Related Payments (Northern Ireland) Order 2004; Constitutional Reform Act 2005; Child Benefit Act 2005; Commissioners for Revenue and Customs Act 2005; Pensions (Northern Ireland) Order 2005; Civil Partnership (Pensions and Benefit Payments) (Consequential, etc. Provisions) Order (Northern Ireland) 2005; Adults with Incapacity (Scotland) Act 2000 (Consequential Modifications) (England, Wales and Northern Ireland) Order 2005; Work and Families (Northern Ireland) Order 2006; Water and Sewerage Services (Northern Ireland) Order 2006; Welfare Reform Act (Northern Ireland) 2007; Welfare Reform Act 2007; Civil Jurisdiction and Judgments Regulations 2007; Companies Act 2006 (Commencement No. 3, Consequential Amendments, Transitional Provisions and Savings) Order 2007; Pensions Act (Northern Ireland) 2008; Finance Act 2008; Child Maintenance Act (Northern Ireland) 2008; Pensions (No. 2) Act (Northern Ireland) 2008; Health and Social Care Act 2008; Employment and Support Allowance (Miscellaneous Amendments) Regulations (Northern Ireland) 2008; Northern Ireland Act 2009; Public Authorities (Reform) Act (Northern Ireland) 2009; Saving Gateway Accounts Act 2009; Transfer of Tribunal Functions and Revenue and Customs Appeals Order 2009; Companies Act 2006 (Consequential Amendments, Transitional Provisions and Savings) Order 2009; Finance Act 2009, Schedule 47 (Consequential Amendments) Order 2009; Finance Act 2009, Section 96 and Schedule 48 (Appointed Day, Savings and Consequential Amendments) Order 2009; Department of Justice Act (Northern Ireland) 2010; Welfare Reform Act (Northern Ireland) 2010; Savings Accounts and Health in Pregnancy Grant Act 2010; Northern Ireland Court Service (Abolition and Transfer of Functions) Order (Northern Ireland) 2010; Northern Ireland Act 1998 (Devolution of Policing and Justice Functions) Order 2010; National Insurance Contributions Act 2011; Postal Services Act 2011; Social Security (Miscellaneous Amendments No. 2) Regulations (Northern Ireland) 2011; Treaty of Lisbon (Changes in Terminology) Order 2011; Civil Jurisdiction and Judgments (Maintenance) Regulations 2011; Pensions Act (Northern Ireland) 2012; Welfare Reform Act 2012; Finance Act 2012; Pensions (2008 Act) (Abolition of Contracting-out for Defined Contribution Pension Schemes) (Consequential Provisions) Regulations (Northern Ireland) 2012; International Recovery of Maintenance (Hague Convention 2007 etc.) Regulations (Northern Ireland) 2012; Local Audit and Accountability Act 2014; National Insurance Contributions Act 2014; Legal Aid and Coroners' Courts Act (Northern Ireland) 2014; Pensions Act 2014; Finance Act 2009, Sections 101 and 102 (Interest on Late Payments and Repayments), Appointed Days and Consequential Provisions Order 2014; Finance Act 2009, Sections 101 and 102 (Interest on Late Payments and Repayments) (Consequential Amendments) Order 2014; Work and Families Act (Northern Ireland) 2015; National Insurance Contributions Act 2015; Pensions Act (Northern Ireland) 2015; Welfare Reform (Northern Ireland) Order 2015; Public Services Ombudsman Act (Northern Ireland) 2016; Investigatory Powers Act 2016; Personal Independence Payment (Supplementary Provisions and Consequential Amendments) Regulations (Northern Ireland) 2016; Pensions (2015 Act) (Consequential Amendments) Order (Northern Ireland) 2016; Welfare Reform and Work (Northern Ireland) Order 2016; Bank of England and Financial Services (Consequential Amendments) Regulations 2017; National Insurance Contributions (Termination Awards and Sporting Testimonials) Act 2019; Social Security (Amendment) (Northern Ireland) (EU Exit) Regulations 2019; Civil Jurisdiction and Judgments (Amendment) (EU Exit) Regulations 2019; Jurisdiction and Judgments (Family) (Amendment etc.) (EU Exit) Regulations 2019; Marriage (Same-sex Couples) and Civil Partnership (Opposite-sex Couples) (Northern Ireland) Regulations 2019; Coronavirus Act 2020; Social Security Co-ordination (Revocation of Retained Direct EU Legislation and Related Amendments) (EU Exit) Regulations 2020; Health and Social Care Act (Northern Ireland) 2022; Parental Bereavement (Leave and Pay) Act (Northern Ireland) 2022; Public Service Pensions and Judicial Offices Act 2022; Finance Act 2026
- Relates to: Social Security Contributions and Benefits Act 1992; Social Security Administration Act 1992; Social Security (Consequential Provisions) Act 1992; Social Security Contributions and Benefits (Northern Ireland) Act 1992; Social Security (Consequential Provisions) (Northern Ireland) Act 1992

Status: Amended

Text of statute as originally enacted

Revised text of statute as amended

Text of the Social Security Administration (Northern Ireland) Act 1992 as in force today (including any amendments) within the United Kingdom, from legislation.gov.uk.

The Social Security Administration (Northern Ireland) Act 1992 (c. 8) is an act of the Parliament of the United Kingdom that consolidated enactments related to the administration of social security in Northern Ireland, with corrections and minor improvements under the Consolidation of Enactments (Procedure) Act 1949.

The enactments consolidated by the act were repealed, in consequence of the consolidation, by the Social Security (Consequential Provisions) (Northern Ireland) Act 1992.

The Social Security Administration Act 1992 made equivalent provisions for Great Britain.

== Provisions ==
The act consists of 168 sections in 15 parts and 7 schedules. Part I covers claims for and payments and general administration of benefit. Part II deals with adjudication. Part III concerns overpayments and adjustments of benefit. Part IV addresses recovery from compensation payments. Part V covers income support and the duty to maintain. Part VI deals with enforcement. Part VII concerns the provision of information. Part VIII covers arrangements for housing benefit. Part IX addresses alteration of contributions and benefits. Part X concerns the computation of benefits. Part XI covers finance. Part XII deals with advisory bodies and the duty to consult. Part XIII covers social security systems outside Northern Ireland, including reciprocal arrangements with foreign states. Part XIV contains miscellaneous provisions and Part XV contains general provisions.

The schedules make provision for claims for benefit made before 1 October 1990 (schedule 1); supplementary provisions relating to Commissioners and tribunals (schedule 2); regulations as to procedure (schedule 3); persons employed in social security administration or adjudication (schedule 4); regulations not requiring prior submission to the Social Security Advisory Committee (schedule 5); the administration of old cases payments (schedule 6); and supplementary benefits (schedule 7).

Section 168(3) provides that the enactments consolidated by the act are repealed, in consequence of the consolidation, by the Social Security (Consequential Provisions) (Northern Ireland) Act 1992.
