= Tax Credits Act 2002 =

Act of the Parliament of the United Kingdom

Tax Credits Act 2002 (Note: Section 70.)
- Act of Parliament
- Parliament of the United Kingdom
- Long title: An Act to make provision for tax credits; to amend the law about child benefit and guardian's allowance; and for connected purposes.
- Citation: 2002 c. 21
- Territorial extent: United Kingdom (Note: Section 69.)

Dates
- Royal assent: 8 July 2002
- Commencement: Various (Note: Section 61.)
Other legislation
Amends	Attachment of Earnings Act 1971; Magistrates' Courts Act 1980; Legal Aid (Scotland) Act 1986; Debtors (Scotland) Act 1987; Social Security Contributions and Benefits Act 1992; Social Security Administration Act 1992; Social Security Contributions and Benefits (Northern Ireland) Act 1992; Social Security Administration (Northern Ireland) Act 1992; Value Added Tax Act 1994; Jobseekers Act 1995; Employment Tribunals Act 1996; Employment Rights Act 1996; Access to Justice Act 1999; Immigration and Asylum Act 1999
Amended by	Child Benefit Act 2005; Child Maintenance and Other Payments Act 2008; Constitutional Reform and Governance Act 2010; Sentencing Act 2020; Veterans Advisory and Pensions Committees Act 2023

Status: Amended

Text of statute as originally enacted

Revised text of statute as amended

The Tax Credits Act 2002 (c. 21) is an act of the Parliament of the United Kingdom passed by the Labour Government at the time, led by Prime Minister Tony Blair. The act established the administrative framework for the implementation of tax credits and sets out who is entitled to tax credits.

== Background ==
The Labour Party continued to make changes to employment and welfare laws; in order to facilitate additional top-ups to the low paid. Thresholds were set down by law but changed by revision upwards on an annual basis. Annual changes were also made to the National Minimum Wage. The aim of the act was to reduce poverty, condemn bad employers for poverty pay, and raise standards.

The tax credits under the act had been introduced in 1999.

== Provisions ==
The act provided for working tax credit (WTC) for those in low-income employment and child tax credit (CTC) for families in poverty.

== Further developments ==
In 2015, the newly elected Conservative majority government determined that Tax Credit abolition would save £4.4 billion from annual expenditure. The plan proposal involved lowering the threshold and increasing the taper rate, in order to take the low paid out of taxation altogether.

The House of Lords, that no longer had an in-built Conservative majority reported that they would consider rejecting the bill of repeal. Government ministers reminded their Lordships that there were precious few precedents for the revocation of a Statutory Instrument of this kind. The Lords has no constitutional authority over financial bills in Parliament. John McDonnell, Shadow Chancellor of the Exchequer argued for bi-partisanship to save what he described as driving 200,000 children into poverty depriving the poorest families on average of £1,300 per annum. Former Chancellor Ken Clarke argued that tax credits subsidised employers to pay low wages. Government policy mantra was "a low tax, high pay, high growth economy."
