= Employment Act 2002 =

Act of the Parliament of the United Kingdom

Employment Act 2002 (Note: Section 55(1).)
- Act of Parliament
- Parliament of the United Kingdom
- Long title: An Act to make provision for statutory rights to paternity and adoption leave and pay; to amend the law relating to statutory maternity leave and pay; to amend the Employment Tribunals Act 1996; to make provision for the use of statutory procedures in relation to employment disputes; to amend the law relating to particulars of employment; to make provision about compromise agreements; to make provision for questionnaires in relation to equal pay; to make provision in connection with trade union learning representatives; to amend section 110 of the Employment Rights Act 1996; to make provision about fixed-term work; to make provision about flexible working; to amend the law relating to maternity allowance; to make provision for work-focused interviews for partners of benefit claimants; to make provision about the use of information for, or relating to, employment and training; and for connected purposes.
- Citation: 2002 c. 22
- Introduced by: Patricia Hewitt, Secretary of State for Trade and Industry (Commons)
- Territorial extent: England and Wales; Scotland; Northern Ireland (in part); (Note: Section 55(5)–(7).)

Dates
- Royal assent: 8 July 2002
- Commencement: Various (Note: Section 55(2)–(3).)
Other legislation
Amends	Social Security Contributions and Benefits Act 1992; Social Security Administration Act 1992; Social Security Contributions and Benefits (Northern Ireland) Act 1992; Social Security Administration (Northern Ireland) Act 1992; Employment Tribunals Act 1996; Employment Rights Act 1996
Amended by	Work and Families Act 2006; Child Maintenance and Other Payments Act 2008; Pensions Act 2014

Status: Amended

Text of statute as originally enacted

Text of the Employment Act 2002 as in force today (including any amendments) within the United Kingdom, from legislation.gov.uk.

The Employment Act 2002 (c. 22) is an act of the Parliament of the United Kingdom, which made a series of amendments to existing UK labour law.

== Provisions ==
The act contained new rules on maternity, paternity and adoption leave and pay, and changes to the tribunal system in the United Kingdom.

The act introduced a mandatory minimum dismissal and disciplinary procedure for employees. The act removed the upper limit for unfair dismissal compensation.

== Reception ==
The act was criticised in the Industrial Law Journal for lacking provision for alternative dispute resolution.
