= National Insurance Contributions Act 2014 =

Act of the Parliament of the United Kingdom

National Insurance Contributions Act 2014 (Note: Section 21(1).)
- Act of Parliament
- Parliament of the United Kingdom
- Long title: An Act to make provision in relation to national insurance contributions; and for connected purposes.
- Citation: 2014 c. 7
- Introduced by: George Osborne MP, Chancellor of the Exchequer (Commons); Lord Deighton (Lords)
- Territorial extent: England and Wales; Scotland; Northern Ireland (Note: Section 21(2)–(3).)

Dates
- Royal assent: 13 March 2014
- Commencement: Various (13 March 2014 - 6 April 2015)
Other legislation
Amends	Social Security Contributions and Benefits Act 1992; Social Security Administration Act 1992; Social Security Contributions and Benefits (Northern Ireland) Act 1992; Social Security Administration (Northern Ireland) Act 1992; Pension Schemes Act 1993; Pension Schemes (Northern Ireland) Act 1993; Social Security Contributions (Transfer of Functions, etc) Act 1999; Social Security Contributions (Transfer of Functions, etc) (Northern Ireland) Order 1999; Social Security (Contributions) Regulations 2001; Finance Act 2013
Amended by	Employment Allowance (Care and Support Workers) Regulations 2015; Finance Act 2016; National Insurance Contributions (Secondary Class 1 Contributions) Act 2025

Status: Amended

History of passage through Parliament

Text of statute as originally enacted

Revised text of statute as amended

The National Insurance Contributions Act 2014 (c. 7) is an act of the Parliament of the United Kingdom that received royal assent on 13 March 2014, after being introduced on 12 October 2013. The act entitled employers to an allowance up to £2,000 against their National Insurance Contributions liability for a tax year.

== Provisions ==
The act created an employment allowance for up to £2,000 or an amount equal to the total liabilities to pay secondary Class 1 national insurance contributions (NICs) if lower, for any person or company paying secondary Class 1 NICs for one for more employees, subject to some exceptions.

The allowance specifically does not apply to public authorities, employers employing a person for purposes connected with the employers personal affairs, service companies or where a businesses has been transferred during the tax year. Where two companies are connected under common control then only one of the companies may claim the allowance.

The act contained measures designed to simplify National Insurance for the self-employed. The act eliminated national insurance contributions for individuals aged between 16 and 21.

The allowance is designed to be claimed as a deduction from payments due to Her Majesty's Revenue and Customs (HMRC).

At the time it was passed, it was estimated that 450,000 businesses would no longer pay national insurance contributions at all due to the measures under the act.

== See also ==
- List of legislation in the United Kingdom
