= Minimum employer contribution =

A minimum employer contribution is a mandatory pension contribution in the United Kingdom, which was made compulsory by the Pensions Act 2008, however it did not come into force until 2012. As a result, all staff are required to be automatically enrolled in a pension scheme when they join a firm. The Cameron Ministry modified this rule by means of the 2011 Pension Act, which brought the rule into force in a series of tranches of employers, over several years (finishing by the end of 2017), instead of all at one moment.

The pension scheme involves a portion of one's earnings being put into a fund by both the employer and the employee, in order to save money for their retirement. Employers are initially only required to contribute 1% towards the employee's pension fund; this will increase to 2% on April 6, 2018, and then to 3% on April 6, 2019. In addition to this, the minimum employee contribution coming out of their workplace earnings will increase from 1% to 3% in April 2018, and will then further increase to 5% in April 2019. If an employer chooses to provide more than the minimum, the employee will only be required to contribute enough to ensure that the total minimum contribution is satisfied.

The National Employment Savings Trust (NEST) was established to assist employers in adhering to the regulations of the Pensions Act 2008. NEST is a low cost pension provider which employers default to using if they are not able to make arrangements with any other provider or would prefer not to do so. In practice, employers were more successful at finding alternative providers than the government had expected, and the restrictions placed on NEST so that it didn't compete with other providers are now deemed unnecessary by the government, hence they were to be removed in April 2017.

The Act also places requirements on defined contribution pension providers who have a choice of funds in which employees can invest; there must be a default option, which must be sensible, for employees who are automatically enrolled, and do not provide any preference about which funds they wish their contributions to be placed in.
