= Pensions Act 2008 =

Act of the Parliament of the United Kingdom

Pensions Act 2008 (Note: Section 151.)
- Act of Parliament
- Parliament of the United Kingdom
- Long title: An Act to make provision relating to pensions; and for connected purposes.
- Citation: 2008 c. 30
- Introduced by: Peter Hain (Commons)
- Territorial extent: England and Wales; Scotland; Northern Ireland (in part); (Note: Section 150.)

Dates
- Royal assent: 26 November 2008
- Commencement: Various (Note: Section 149.)
Other legislation
Amends	Polish Resettlement Act 1947; House of Commons Disqualification Act 1975; Social Security Contributions and Benefits Act 1992; Social Security Administration Act 1992; Social Security Contributions and Benefits (Northern Ireland) Act 1992; Pension Schemes Act 1993; Employment Tribunals Act 1996; Pensions Act 2007
Amended by	Pensions Act 2014; Pension Schemes Act 2026

Status: Amended

History of passage through Parliament

Text of statute as originally enacted

Revised text of statute as amended

The Pensions Act 2008 (c. 30) is an act of the Parliament of the United Kingdom. The principal change brought about by the act is that all workers will have to opt out of an occupational pension plan of their employer, rather than opt in. A second change is the creation of a National Employment Savings Trust, a public pension provider for those who do not have an occupational pensions, which will function as a low-fee pension scheme in competition with existing funds.

== Provisions ==
=== Automatic enrolment ===
The cornerstone of the act is the introduction of automatic enrolment. This provision requires employers to automatically enrol eligible workers into a qualifying pension scheme. The key aspects of automatic enrolment include:

- Workers aged between 22 and the State Pension age, earning above a certain threshold (initially set at £5,035, later increased to £10,000), must be automatically enrolled.
- Instead of choosing to join a pension scheme, workers now have to actively decide to opt out if they do not wish to participate
- Employers must enrol eligible workers from their first day of employment, although some high-quality schemes may have a three-month deferral period

=== National Employment Savings Trust (NEST) ===
The act provided for the creation of the National Employment Savings Trust (NEST), a public pension provider designed to offer a low-fee pension scheme. NEST serves as an alternative for workers who do not have access to an occupational pension scheme through their employer.

=== Employer contributions ===
A key feature of the act is the requirement for employers to contribute to their workers' pension schemes. The minimum contribution rates were phased in over time, starting at 2% of qualifying earnings and increasing in subsequent years.

=== Implementation timeline ===
The implementation of the Pensions Act 2008 was staged over several years:

- October 2012: Large employers began implementing automatic enrolment
- June 2015 to May 2017: Small and micro employers were brought into the scheme
- September 2017: The final staging date for the rollout of automatic enrolment

==== Commencement orders ====
The act was commenced in force over time by a number of statutory instruments between 2008 and 2018:

- Pensions Act 2008 (Commencement No. 1 and Consequential Provision) Order 2008 (SI 2008/3241)
- Pensions Act 2008 (Commencement No. 2) Order 2009 (SI 2009/82)
- Pensions Act 2008 (Commencement No. 3 and Consequential Provisions) Order 2009 (SI 2009/809)
- Pensions Act 2008 (Commencement No. 4) Order 2009 (SI 2009/1566)
- Pensions Act 2008 (Commencement No. 5) Order 2010 (SI 2010/10)
- Pensions Act 2008 (Commencement No. 6) Order 2010 (SI 2010/467)
- Pensions Act 2008 (Commencement No. 7 and Saving, Consequential and Incidental Provisions) Order 2010 (SI 2010/1145)
- Pensions Act 2008 (Commencement No. 8) Order 2010 (SI 2010/1221)
- Pensions Act 2008 (Commencement No. 9) Order 2011 (SI 2011/664)
- Pensions Act 2008 (Commencement No. 10) Order 2011 (SI 2011/1266)
- Pensions Act 2008 (Commencement No. 11) Order 2011 (SI 2011/3033)
- Pensions Act 2008 (Commencement No. 12) Order 2012 (SI 2012/683)
- Pensions Act 2008 (Commencement No. 13) Order 2012 (SI 2012/1682)
- Pensions Act 2008 (Commencement No. 14 and Supplementary Provisions) Order 2012 (SI 2012/2480)
- Pensions Act 2008 (Commencement No. 15) Order 2014 (SI 2014/463)
- Pensions Act 2008 (Commencement No. 16) Order 2018 (SI 2018/63)

=== Compliance and enforcement ===
The Pensions Regulator was given responsibility for ensuring compliance with the new regulations. The regulator has the power to issue notices and penalties to employers who fail to meet their obligations under the Act.

== Amendments and future developments ==
Since its enactment, the Pensions Act 2008 has undergone several amendments and updates. These include changes to earnings thresholds, contribution rates, and the expansion of eligibility criteria.

== See also ==
- Minimum employer contribution
- Pensions in the United Kingdom
- National Employment Savings Trust
- Pensions in the United States
- Pension Protection Act of 2006, a law allowing (but not requiring) employers to automatically enrol employees into defined contribution schemes

State pensions acts

- National Insurance Act 1946
- Social Security Contributions and Benefits Act 1992 ()

Private pensions Acts

- Pension Schemes Act 1993
- Pensions Act 1995
- Pensions Act 2004
- Pensions Act 2007

== Bibliography ==
- 'All firms must offer pensions, government agrees' (27 October 2010) BBC News
- E McGaughey, A Casebook on Labour Law (Hart 2019) ch 6(4)
