= Child Benefit Act 2005 =

Act of the Parliament of the United Kingdom

Child Benefit Act 2005 (Note: Section 7.)
- Act of Parliament
- Parliament of the United Kingdom
- Long title: An Act to make provision for and in connection with altering the descriptions of persons in respect of whom a person may be entitled to child benefit.
- Citation: 2005 c. 6
- Territorial extent: England and Wales; Scotland; Northern Ireland; (Note: Section 5.)

Dates
- Royal assent: 24 March 2005
- Commencement: 10 April 2006 (Note: Section 6. Except that any power to make regulations conferred on the Treasury by virtue of this act could be exercised at any time after the passing of this act.)
Other legislation
Amends	Social Security Contributions and Benefits Act 1992; Social Security Administration Act 1992; Social Security Contributions and Benefits (Northern Ireland) Act 1992; Social Security Administration (Northern Ireland) Act 1992; Social Security Act 1998; Social Security (Northern Ireland) Order 1998; Tax Credits Act 2002
Amended by	Pensions Act 2007; Pensions Act (Northern Ireland) 2008; Welfare Reform Act 2009; Welfare Reform Act (Northern Ireland) 2010

Status: Amended

Text of statute as originally enacted

Revised text of statute as amended

The Child Benefit Act 2005 (c. 6) is an act of the Parliament of the United Kingdom.

== Background ==
The precursor of this act was the report "Supporting young people to achieve: towards a new deal for skills" published in March 2004 by HM Treasury, the Department for Work and Pensions and the Department for Education and Skills.

== Provisions ==
The act provided for child benefit to be paid to 16 to 19 year olds in unpaid work-based training.

The act containe measures conditions of entitlement to child benefit provided for in part 9 of the Social Security Contributions and Benefits Act 1992 and in part 9 of the Social Security Contributions and Benefits (Northern Ireland) Act 1992.
