= Work and Families Act 2006 =

Act of the Parliament of the United Kingdom

Work and Families Act 2006 (Note: Section 20(1).)
- Act of Parliament
- Parliament of the United Kingdom
- Long title: An Act to make provision about statutory rights to leave and pay in connection with the birth or adoption of children; to amend section 80F of the Employment Rights Act 1996; to make provision about workers' entitlement to annual leave; to provide for the increase in the sums specified in section 186(1) and 227(1) of that Act; and for connected purposes.
- Citation: 2006 c. 18
- Territorial extent: England and Wales; Scotland; Northern Ireland (in part); (Note: Section 20(2)–(3).)

Dates
- Royal assent: 21 June 2006
- Commencement: Various (Note: Section 19.)
Other legislation
| Amends | Social Security Act 1989; Finance Act 1989; Social Security Contributions and Benefits Act 1992; Social Security Administration Act 1992; Employment Tribunals Act 1996; Employment Rights Act 1996; Finance Act 1997; Social Security Contributions (Transfer of Functions, etc.) Act 1999; Finance Act 1999; Employment Act 2002; Proceeds of Crime Act 2002; Income Tax (Earnings and Pensions) Act 2003; Commissioners for Revenue and Customs Act 2005 |
| Amended by | Treaty of Lisbon (Changes in Terminology) Order 2011; Welfare Reform Act 2012; Children and Families Act 2014; Employment Rights (Amendment) (EU Exit) (No. 2) Regulations 2019 |
| Relates to | Childcare Act 2006 |

Status: Amended

History of passage through Parliament

Text of statute as originally enacted

Revised text of statute as amended

The Work and Families Act 2006 (c. 18) is an act of the Parliament of the United Kingdom relating to maternity pay, paternity pay and flexible working.

== Background ==
The government stated the goal of the legislation was to "ensure every child gets the best start in life and to give parents more choice enabling them to balance their work and family responsibilities."

== Provisions ==
The act extends maternity leave and makes a proportion of paid maternity leave transferrable. The act allows fathers to take three months' paid leave to care for their babies.

The act extends the right to request flexible working to more groups with caring responsibilities.

The act contains measures to help employers to manage Statutory Maternity Pay, Statutory Paternity Pay and Statutory Adoption Pay. It also increases the period of notice for return from maternity leave to two months.

== See also ==
- Childcare Act 2006
