= National Insurance Contributions Act 2006 =

Act of the Parliament of the United Kingdom

National Insurance Contributions Act 2006 (Note: Section 10.)
- Act of Parliament
- Parliament of the United Kingdom
- Long title: An Act to make provision about national insurance contributions in cases where there is a retrospective change to the law relating to income tax and to enable related provision to be made for the purposes of contributory benefits, statutory payments and other matters; to make provision about the disclosure of information in relation to arrangements for the avoidance of national insurance contributions; and for connected purposes.
- Citation: 2006 c. 10
- Territorial extent: England and Wales; Scotland; Northern Ireland; (Note: Section 8.)

Dates
- Royal assent: 30 March 2006
- Commencement: 30 March 2006 (Note: Section 9.)
Other legislation
Amends	Social Security Contributions and Benefits Act 1992; Social Security Administration Act 1992; Social Security Contributions and Benefits (Northern Ireland) Act 1992

Status: Current legislation

History of passage through Parliament

Text of statute as originally enacted

Revised text of statute as amended

The National Insurance Contributions Act 2006 (c. 10) is an act of the Parliament of the United Kingdom. It amends the law relating to national insurance contributions. Its precursor was an announcement made in the Paymaster General's Pre-Budget Report 2004.

== Provisions ==
The act allowed national insurance contributions to include retrospective tax charges (or liability) from 2 December 2004 and onwards.

The act included measures targeting those using complicated schemes to avoid national insurance contributions and tax: largely from bonuses paid in the financial services industry.

HM Revenue and Customs estimated that the act would secure £95 million in national insurance contributions for the financial year 2004-05 and £240 million per annum in subsequent years.
