= Finance Act 2003 =

Act of the Parliament of the United Kingdom

Finance Act 2003 (Note: Section 217.)
- Act of Parliament
- Parliament of the United Kingdom
- Long title: An Act to grant certain duties, to alter other duties, and to amend the law relating to the National Debt and the Public Revenue, and to make further provision in connection with finance.
- Citation: 2003 c 14
- Territorial extent: United Kingdom

Dates
- Royal assent: 10 July 2003
- Commencement: 10 July 2003 (Note: Section 4(b) of the Interpretation Act 1978.)
Other legislation
Amends	National Savings Bank Act 1971; Betting and Gaming Duties Act 1981; Inheritance Tax Act 1984; Social Security Contributions and Benefits Act 1992; Social Security Contributions and Benefits (Northern Ireland) Act 1992; Value Added Tax Act 1994; Capital Allowances Act 2001
Amended by	National Health Service (Consequential Provisions) Act 2006; Statute Law (Repeals) Act 2013; Renters' Rights Act 2025

Status: Amended

Text of statute as originally enacted

Revised text of statute as amended

The Finance Act 2003 (c. 14) is an act of the Parliament of the United Kingdom prescribing changes to Excise Duties, Value Added Tax, Income Tax, Corporation Tax, and Capital Gains Tax. It enacts the 2003 Budget speech made by Chancellor of the Exchequer Gordon Brown to the Parliament of the United Kingdom.

In the UK, the Chancellor delivers an annual Budget speech outlining changes in spending, tax and duty. The respective year's Finance Act is the mechanism to enact the changes.

The rules governing the various taxation methods are contained within the various taxation Acts. (For instance Capital Gains Tax legislation is contained within Taxation of Chargeable Gains Act 1992. The Finance Act details amendments to be made to each one of these acts.

== Stamp duty land tax ==
Stamp duty land tax (SDLT), a new tax on land transactions, was introduced by the 2003 act. SDLT largely replaced stamp duty from 1 December 2003. SDLT is not a stamp duty, but a form of self-assessed transfer tax charged on "land transactions".
