= National Insurance Contributions and Statutory Payments Act 2004 =

Act of the Parliament of the United Kingdom

National Insurance Contributions and Statutory Payments Act 2004 (Note: Section 15.)
- Act of Parliament
- Parliament of the United Kingdom
- Long title: An Act to make provision relating to the payment and administration of national insurance contributions and the provision of information in connection with the payment of statutory sick pay and statutory maternity pay, and for connected purposes.
- Citation: 2004 c. 3
- Territorial extent: England and Wales; Scotland; Northern Ireland; (Note: Section 14. Sections 1, 3, 5, 7 and 9 extend only to England and Wales and Scotland, sections 2, 4, 6, 8 and 10 extend only to Northern Ireland, and an amendment, repeal or revocation contained in Schedule 1 or 2 has the same extent as the enactment or instrument to which it relates.)

Dates
- Royal assent: 13 May 2004
- Commencement: 1 September 2004; 1 January 2005; 6 April 2005; (Note: Section 13. The National Insurance Contributions and Statutory Payments Act 2004 (Commencement) Order 2004 (SI 2004/1943).)
Other legislation
Amends	Taxes Management Act 1970; Social Security Contributions and Benefits Act 1992; Social Security Administration Act 1992; Social Security Contributions and Benefits (Northern Ireland) Act 1992; Social Security Administration (Northern Ireland) Act 1992; Social Security Contributions (Transfer of Functions, etc.) Act 1999; Welfare Reform and Pensions Act 1999; Child Support, Pensions and Social Security Act 2000; Child Support, Pensions and Social Security Act (Northern Ireland) 2000
Amended by	Social Security Contributions and Benefits (Northern Ireland) Act 1992

Status: Amended

Text of statute as originally enacted

Revised text of statute as amended

The National Insurance Contributions and Statutory Payments Act 2004 (c. 3) is an act of the Parliament of the United Kingdom.

== Provisions ==
The act replaced the existing criminal enforcement system with a civil enforcement system.

The act allowed employees to pay their employers' national insurance contributions arising from restricted and convertible shares or securities, after an agreement is made between the employee and the employer.
