= Veterans Advisory and Pensions Committee =

Veterans Advisory and Pensions Committees
- Formation: 1921
- Founder: Lloyd George ministry
- Website: www.gov.uk/government/organisations/veterans-advisory-and-pensions-committees-x13
- Formerly called: War Pensions Committees

The Veterans Advisory and Pensions Committees, formerly the War Pensions Committees, are regional committees established to support veterans and their families in the United Kingdom. Members are appointed by defence ministers but they work independently of the UK Ministry of Defence.

== History ==
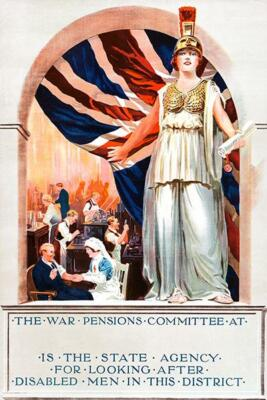
War Pensions Committee Poster (First World War)

At the start of the First World War, the activist and writer Sylvia Pankhurst persuaded Minnie Lansbury to become secretary of the League of Rights for Soldiers' and Sailors' Wives and Relatives, fighting for the rights of disabled servicemen and their families. In response to such pressures, the Asquith coalition ministry implemented the Naval and War Military Pensions Act 1915, thereby establishing War Pensions Committees in every county and large town in the UK in early 1916. A total of 155 committees were set up at that time. Posters advertising the new committees were placed on billboards throughout the UK: they displayed Britannia standing in a white dress with a gold breastplate and helmet with a panel underneath inscribed with the statement "The War Pensions Committee at [name of place] is the state agency for looking after disabled men in this district".

John Hodge, the Minister of Pensions, appointed August 1917, was shocked to come across the "Lost Files Room" with tens of thousands of incomplete claims. Missing records were common and many disabled servicemen had to wait at least a year to hear about compensation. A demonstration by disabled veterans in Hyde Park turned violent when police erected barricades in May 1919. Following strong criticism of the officials administering the compensation payments by Douglas Haig, 1st Earl Haig, the committees were given statutory backing by the Lloyd George ministry as non-departmental public bodies in 1921.

The role of the committees, throughout the 20th century, was to make recommendations to ministers as to the administration of compensation, to hear complaints from applicants and make representations on such matters to the minister. Many people were recognized for their important advocacy work as secretaries or members of the committees.

Veterans Advisory and Pensions Committees Act 2023 (Note: Section 3(6).)
- Act of Parliament
- Parliament of the United Kingdom
- Long title: An Act to make provision about veterans advisory and pensions committees; and for connected purposes.
- Citation: 2023 c. 48
- Introduced by: Robin Millar MP (Commons); Mark Lancaster (Lords)
- Territorial extent: England and Wales; Scotland; Northern Ireland; (Note: Section 3(1)–(2).)

Dates
- Royal assent: 18 September 2023
- Commencement: 18 September 2023 (except sections 1 and 2(1).; not yet in force (rest of act); (Note: Section 3(3)–(5).)
Other legislation
Amends	War Pensions Act 1921; Chronically Sick and Disabled Persons Act 1970; Social Security Act 1989; Social Security Contributions and Benefits Act 1992; Social Security Administration Act 1992; Social Security Act 1998; Welfare Reform and Pensions Act 1999; Television Licences (Disclosure of Information) Act 2000; Social Security Fraud Act 2001; Tax Credits Act 2002; Armed Forces Act 2006; Digital Switchover (Disclosure of Information) Act 2007; Data Protection Act 2018

Status: Partly in force

Text of statute as originally enacted

Revised text of statute as amended

The committees continued to operate at local level, until they were re-organised on a regional level under the War Pensions Committees Regulations 2000 in the early 21st century. Their name was changed from the War Pensions Committees to the Veterans Advisory and Pensions Committees in December 2017. Further provisions were made for regulation of their work under the Veterans Advisory and Pensions Committees Act 2023 (c. 48). The committee's remit was expanded by the 2023 act in order to ensure that the committee was able to meet the needs of veterans as they changed since the original legislation had been passed. Committee members were typically appointed for three-year terms.

== Bibliography ==
- Cohen, Deborah (2001). The War Come Home: Disabled Veterans in Britain and Germany, 1914–1939. University of California Press. ISBN 978-0520220089.
