= Commissioners for Revenue and Customs Act 2005 =

Act of the Parliament of the United Kingdom

Commissioners for Revenue and Customs Act 2005 (Note: Section 57.)
- Act of Parliament
- Parliament of the United Kingdom
- Long title: An Act to make provision for the appointment of Commissioners to exercise functions presently vested in the Commissioners of Inland Revenue and the Commissioners of Customs and Excise; for the establishment of a Revenue and Customs Prosecutions Office; and for connected purposes.
- Citation: 2005 c. 11
- Territorial extent: United Kingdom, but an amendment, modification or repeal effected by this act has the same extent as the enactment (or the relevant part of the enactment) to which it relates. (Note: Section 56.)

Dates
- Royal assent: 7 April 2005
- Commencement: 7 April 2005 (Note: Section 53(1). The Commissioners for Revenue and Customs Act 2005 (Commencement) Order 2005 (SI 2006/1126).)
Other legislation
Amends	Biological Weapons Act 1974; Ministers of the Crown Act 1975; Customs and Excise Management Act 1979; Debtors (Scotland) Act 1987; Social Security Contributions and Benefits Act 1992; Social Security Administration Act 1992; Social Security Contributions and Benefits (Northern Ireland) Act 1992; Social Security Administration (Northern Ireland) Act 1992; Pension Schemes (Northern Ireland) Act 1993; Value Added Tax Act 1994; Drug Trafficking Act 1994; Chemical Weapons Act 1996; Terrorism Act 2000; Capital Allowances Act 2001; Anti-terrorism, Crime and Security Act 2001
Repeals/revokes	Inland Revenue Regulation Act 1890; Public Accounts and Charges Act 1891
Amended by	Work and Families Act 2006; UK Borders Act 2007; Criminal Justice and Immigration Act 2008; Scotland Act 2012; Wales Act 2014; Infrastructure Act 2015; Investigatory Powers Act 2016; Policing and Crime Act 2017; Wales Act 2017; Finance Act 2026

Status: Amended

Text of statute as originally enacted

Revised text of statute as amended

The Commissioners for Revenue and Customs Act 2005 (c. 11) is an act of the Parliament of the United Kingdom which established HM Revenue and Customs.

== Background ==
The policy was first announced in the 2004 budget.

== Provisions ==
The act combined the Inland Revenue and HM Customs and Excise into a single government department, HM Revenue and Customs. The act prohibits disclosure of taxpayers' information, but this does not apply if it is "made for the purposes of a function of the Revenue and Customs".

== Reception ==
The original bill was criticised by the Institute of Chartered Accountants of Scotland for lacking an appeal mechanism.

== See also ==
- Customs
