= Social Security Administration Act 1992 =

Act of the Parliament of the United Kingdom

Social Security Administration Act 1992 (Note: Section 192(1).)
- Act of Parliament
- Parliament of the United Kingdom
- Long title: An Act to consolidate certain enactments relating to the administration of social security and related matters with amendments to give effect to recommendations of the Law Commission and the Scottish Law Commission.
- Citation: 1992 c. 5
- Territorial extent: England and Wales; Scotland; Northern Ireland (in part); (Note: Section 192(5)–(6).)

Dates
- Royal assent: 13 February 1992
- Commencement: 1 July 1992 (Note: Section 192(4).)

Other legislation
- Amended by: List: Social Security (Consequential Provisions) Act 1992; Local Government Finance Act 1992; Social Security (Mortgage Interest Payments) Act 1992; Tribunals and Inquiries Act 1992; Registration of Births, Deaths and Marriages (Fees) (No. 2) Order 1992; Registration of Births, Deaths and Marriages (Fees) (Scotland) Order 1992; Judicial Pensions and Retirement Act 1993; Pension Schemes Act 1993; Pension Schemes (Northern Ireland) Act 1993; Social Security (Contributions) Act 1994; Statutory Sick Pay Act 1994; Social Security (Incapacity for Work) Act 1994; Local Government (Wales) Act 1994; Local Government etc. (Scotland) Act 1994; Deregulation and Contracting Out Act 1994; Jobseekers Act 1995; Pensions Act 1995; Child Support Act 1995; Criminal Procedure (Consequential Provisions) (Scotland) Act 1995; Statutory Sick Pay Percentage Threshold Order 1995; Registration of Births, Deaths and Marriages (Fees) Order 1995; Pensions (Northern Ireland) Order 1995; Industrial Tribunals Act 1996; Arbitration Act 1996; Social Security (Overpayments) Act 1996; Housing Act 1996; Registration of Births, Deaths and Marriages (Fees) Order 1996; Social Security (Recovery of Benefits) Act 1997; Social Security Administration (Fraud) Act 1997; Registration of Births, Deaths and Marriages (Fees) (Scotland) Order 1997; Registration of Births, Deaths and Marriages (Fees) Order 1997; Social Security Act 1998; Magistrates' Courts (Procedure) Act 1998; Audit Commission Act 1998; Government of Wales Act 1998; Northern Ireland Act 1998; Social Security Benefits Up-rating Order 1998; Registration of Births, Deaths and Marriages (Fees) Order 1998; Social Security Contributions (Transfer of Functions, etc. ) Act 1999; Tax Credits Act 1999; Access to Justice Act 1999; Local Government Act 1999; Welfare Reform and Pensions Act 1999; Social Security Contributions (Transfer of Functions, etc.) (Northern Ireland) Order 1999; Registration of Births, Deaths and Marriages (Fees) (Amendment) Order 1999; Scotland Act 1998 (Consequential Modifications) (No.2) Order 1999; Registration of Births, Deaths and Marriages (Fees) Order 1999; Adults with Incapacity (Scotland) Act 2000; Child Support, Pensions and Social Security Act (Northern Ireland); Powers of Criminal Courts (Sentencing) Act 2000; Child Support, Pensions and Social Security Act 2000; Housing (Scotland) Act 2001; Social Security Fraud Act 2001; Postal Services Act 2000 (Consequential Modifications No. 1) Order 2001; Transfer of Functions (War Pensions etc.) Order 2001; Financial Services and Markets Act 2000 (Consequential Amendments and Repeals) Order 2001; Civil Jurisdiction and Judgments Order 2001; State Pension Credit Act 2002; Debt Arrangement and Attachment (Scotland) Act 2002; National Insurance Contributions Act 2002; Tax Credits Act 2002; Employment Act 2002; Registration of Births, Deaths and Marriages (Fees) (Scotland) Order 2002; Social Security Administration Act 1992 (Amendment) Order 2002; Secretaries of State for Education and Skills and for Work and Pensions Order 2002; Regulatory Reform (Carer's Allowance) Order 2002; Financial Services and Markets Act 2000 (Consequential Amendments) Order 2002; Registration of Births, Deaths and Marriages (Fees) Order 2002; Income Tax (Earnings and Pensions) Act 2003; Local Government Act 2003; Courts Act 2003; Criminal Justice Act 2003; National Insurance Contributions and Statutory Payments Act 2004; Age-Related Payments Act 2004; Public Audit (Wales) Act 2004; Civil Partnership Act 2004; Pensions Act 2004; Water Industry (Scotland) Act 2002 (Consequential Modifications) Order 2004; Scottish Public Services Ombudsman Act 2002 (Consequential Provisions and Modifications) Order 2004; Age-Related Payments (Northern Ireland) Order 2004; Child Benefit Act 2005; Mental Capacity Act 2005; Public Services Ombudsman (Wales) Act 2005; Commissioners for Revenue and Customs Act 2005; Adults with Incapacity (Scotland) Act 2000 (Consequential Modifications) (England, Wales and Northern Ireland) Order 2005; Civil Partnership (Pensions and Benefit Payments) (Consequential, etc. Provisions) Order 2005; Civil Partnership Act 2004 (Overseas Relationships and Consequential, etc. Amendments) Order 2005; National Insurance Contributions Act 2006; Local Electoral Administration and Registration Services (Scotland) Act 2006; Work and Families Act 2006; Social Security (Graduated Retirement Benefit) (Consequential Provisions) Order 2006; Bankruptcy and Diligence etc. (Scotland) Act 2007; Welfare Reform Act 2007; Tribunals, Courts and Enforcement Act 2007; Statistics and Registration Service Act 2007; Pensions Act 2007; Local Government and Public Involvement in Health Act 2007; Civil Jurisdiction and Judgments Regulations 2007; Companies Act 2006 (Commencement No. 3, Consequential Amendments, Transitional Provisions and Savings) Order 2007; Child Maintenance and Other Payments Act 2008; Finance Act 2008; Health and Social Care Act 2008; Housing and Regeneration Act 2008; Education and Skills Act 2008; Pensions Act 2008; Transfer of Tribunal Functions Order 2008; Local Government (Wales) Measure 2009; Saving Gateway Accounts Act 2009; Welfare Reform Act 2009; Transfer of Tribunal Functions and Revenue and Customs Appeals Order 2009; Registration of Births, Deaths and Marriages (Fees) (Scotland) Order 2009; Companies Act 2006 (Consequential Amendments, Transitional Provisions and Savings) Order 2009; Finance Act 2009, Schedule 47 (Consequential Amendments) Order 2009; Finance Act 2009, Section 96 and Schedule 48 (Appointed Day, Savings and Consequential Amendments) Order 2009; Savings Accounts and Health in Pregnancy Grant Act 2010; Registration of Births, Deaths and Marriages (Fees) Order 2010; Northern Ireland Act 1998 (Devolution of Policing and Justice Functions) Order 2010; Guardian's Allowance Up-rating Order 2010; National Insurance Contributions Act 2011; Budget Responsibility and National Audit Act 2011; Postal Services Act 2011; Pensions Act 2011; Localism Act 2011; Treaty of Lisbon (Changes in Terminology) Order 2011; Civil Jurisdiction and Judgments (Maintenance) Regulations 2011; Pensions Act 2007 (Abolition of Contracting-out for Defined Contribution Pension Schemes) (Consequential Amendments) (No. 2) Regulations 2011; Social Security (Miscellaneous Amendments) (No. 3) Regulations 2011; Welfare Reform Act 2012; Legal Aid, Sentencing and Punishment of Offenders Act 2012; Finance Act 2012; Financial Services Act 2012; International Recovery of Maintenance (Hague Convention 2007 etc.) Regulations 2012; Public Audit (Wales) Act 2013; Crime and Courts Act 2013; Public Bodies (Abolition of the Disability Living Allowance Advisory Board) Order 2013; Personal Independence Payment (Supplementary Provisions and Consequential Amendments) Regulations 2013; Public Bodies (Abolition of Administrative Justice and Tribunals Council) Order 2013; Local Audit and Accountability Act 2014; Children and Families Act 2014; National Insurance Contributions Act 2014; Pensions Act 2014; Marriage (Same Sex Couples) Act 2013 (Consequential and Contrary Provisions and Scotland) Order 2014; Finance Act 2009, Sections 101 and 102 (Interest on Late Payments and Repayments), Appointed Days and Consequential Provisions Order 2014; Finance Act 2009, Sections 101 and 102 (Interest on Late Payments and Repayments) (Consequential Amendments) Order 2014; Universal Credit and Miscellaneous Amendments (No.2) Regulations 2014; Marriage (Same Sex Couples) Act 2013 (Consequential and Contrary Provisions and Scotland) and Marriage and Civil Partnership (Scotland) Act 2014 (Consequential Provisions) Order 2014; Marriage and Civil Partnership (Scotland) Act 2014 and Civil Partnership Act 2004 (Consequential Provisions and Modifications) Order 2014; National Insurance Contributions Act 2015; Social Security (Penalty as Alternative to Prosecution) (Maximum Amount) Order 2015; Universal Credit and Miscellaneous Amendments Regulations 2015; Welfare Reform and Work Act 2016; Scotland Act 2016; Immigration Act 2016; Investigatory Powers Act 2016; Pensions Act 2014 (Consequential and Supplementary Amendments) Order 2016; Pensions Act 2014 (Consequential Amendments) Order 2016; Welfare Reform and Work (Northern Ireland) Order 2016; Bankruptcy (Scotland) Act 2016 (Consequential Provisions and Modifications) Order 2016; Parental Bereavement (Leave and Pay) Act 2018; EEA Passport Rights (Amendment, etc., and Transitional Provisions) (EU Exit) Regulations 2018; National Insurance Contributions (Termination Awards and Sporting Testimonials) Act 2019; Social Security (Amendment) (EU Exit) Regulations 2019; Civil Jurisdiction and Judgments (Amendment) (EU Exit) Regulations 2019; Jurisdiction and Judgments (Family) (Amendment etc.) (EU Exit) Regulations 2019; Coronavirus Act 2020; Sentencing Act 2020; Social Security Co-ordination (Revocation of Retained Direct EU Legislation and Related Amendments) (EU Exit) Regulations 2020; Local Government and Elections (Wales) Act 2021 (Consequential Amendments) Regulations 2021; National Insurance Contributions Act 2022; Social Security (Class 2 National Insurance Contributions Increase of Threshold) Regulations 2022; Neonatal Care (Leave and Pay) Act 2023; Veterans Advisory and Pensions Committees Act 2023; National Insurance Contributions (Reduction in Rates) Act 2023; Data (Use and Access) Act 2025; Public Authorities (Fraud, Error and Recovery) Act 2025; Finance Act 2026
- Relates to: Social Security Contributions and Benefits Act 1992; Social Security (Consequential Provisions) Act 1992; Social Security Contributions and Benefits (Northern Ireland) Act 1992; Social Security Administration (Northern Ireland) Act 1992; Social Security (Consequential Provisions) (Northern Ireland) Act 1992

Status: Amended

Text of statute as originally enacted

Revised text of statute as amended

Text of the Social Security Administration Act 1992 as in force today (including any amendments) within the United Kingdom, from legislation.gov.uk.

The Social Security Administration Act 1992 (c. 5) is an act of the Parliament of the United Kingdom. The act is the main piece of legislation dealing with the administration of social security benefits in the United Kingdom.

The enactments consolidated by the act were repealed, in consequence of the consolidation, by the Social Security (Consequential Provisions) Act 1992.

The Social Security Contributions and Benefits (Northern Ireland) Act 1992 made equivalent provisions for Northern Ireland.

== History ==
There has been various types of support for those without income in the UK since medieval times but 'modern' social security began in the mid 20th century. Various Acts of Parliament and Statutory Instruments dealt with the rules, but the current regulation is covered, in the main, by this much amended act.

== Amendments ==
There has been a number of amendments since the act was first passed, the main ones being the Social Security Administration (Fraud) Act 1997 (c. 47), the Social Security Act 1998 (c. 14), the Social Security Fraud Act 2001 (c. 11), and the Welfare Reform Act 2007 (c. 5),.

== Statutory instruments ==
Although the base legislation is contained within the acts, most of the actual rules and regulations come within a plethora of Statutory Instruments. The best place to view these is via (National Archives), a UK Governmental website.

== Offences ==
The main offences created by the act (and subsequent amendments) are :

s.111 : failure by specified body to provide information;
s.111A : dishonestly making false claims or withholding information about relevant changes; and
s.112 : knowingly making false claims or withholding information about relevant changes.

Section 111A is an either way offence, the others are summary only.

=== Prosecution - legal points ===
Where cases of benefit fraud result in criminal prosecution of an individual, in England & Wales such prosecutions are generally brought either under section 112 Social Security Administration Act 1992 (where no dishonesty is alleged) or under s111A of the same Act (where dishonesty is alleged). There are a number of legal cases relevant to prosecutions under these sections. Key points are dealt with in more detail in technical articles on benefit fraud.

The penalties for benefit fraud may be mitigated where it can be shown that the defendant would have been entitled to other forms of financial benefit, such as UK Tax Credits, had an appropriate claim on the true facts been lodged at the time.

A person convicted of benefit fraud may be held to have a 'criminal lifestyle' in confiscation proceedings under Parts 2, 3 & 4 of the Proceeds of Crime Act 2002.
