= Finance Act 2012 =

Act of the Parliament of the United Kingdom

Finance Act 2012 (Note: Section 229.)
- Act of Parliament
- Parliament of the United Kingdom
- Long title: An Act to grant certain duties, to alter other duties, and to amend the law relating to the National Debt and the Public Revenue, and to make further provision in connection with finance.
- Citation: 2012 c. 4
- Territorial extent: United Kingdom

Dates
- Royal assent: 8 April 2012
- Commencement: 8 April 2012 (Note: Section 4(b) of the Interpretation Act 1978.)
Other legislation
Amends	Transport Act 1962; Customs and Excise Management Act 1979; Betting and Gaming Duties Act 1981; Inheritance Tax Act 1984; Social Security Contributions and Benefits Act 1992; Social Security Administration Act 1992; Social Security Contributions and Benefits (Northern Ireland) Act 1992; Social Security Administration (Northern Ireland) Act 1992; Value Added Tax Act 1994; Capital Allowances Act 2001; National Health Service Act 2006; National Health Service (Consequential Provisions) Act 2006; Legal Services Act 2007; Constitutional Reform and Governance Act 2010
Amended by	Co-operative and Community Benefit Societies Act 2014; Finance Act 2015; Sentencing Act 2020

Status: Amended

History of passage through Parliament

Text of statute as originally enacted

Revised text of statute as amended

The Finance Act 2012 (c. 4) is an act of the Parliament of the United Kingdom enacting the 2012 United Kingdom Budget. The Chancellor of the Exchequer delivers the annual budget speech outlining changes in spending, tax, duty and other financial matters. The respective year's Finance Act is the mechanism to enact the changes. Levels of Excise Duties, Value Added Tax, Income Tax, Corporation Tax and Capital Gains Tax) are often modified.

The rules governing the various taxation methods are contained within the relevant taxation acts. (For instance Capital Gains Tax Legislation is contained within Taxation of Chargeable Gains Act 1992). The Finance Act details amendments to be made to each one of these Acts.
