= Jobseekers Act 1995 =

Act of the Parliament of the United Kingdom

Jobseekers Act 1995 (Note: Section 41(1).)
- Act of Parliament
- Parliament of the United Kingdom
- Long title: An Act to provide for a jobseeker's allowance and to make other provision to promote the employment of the unemployed and the assistance of persons without a settled way of life.
- Citation: 1995 c. 18
- Territorial extent: England and Wales; Scotland; Northern Ireland (in part); (Note: Section 41(6).)

Dates
- Royal assent: 28 June 1995
- Commencement: various (Note: Section 41(2)–(3).)
Other legislation
Amends	Supplementary Benefits Act 1976; Magistrates' Courts Act 1980; Social Security Contributions and Benefits Act 1992; Social Security Administration Act 1992
Amended by	Jobseeker's Allowance (Transitional Provisions) Regulations 1995; Industrial Tribunals Act 1996; Employment Rights Act 1996; Education Act 1996; Social Security (Recovery of Benefits) Act 1997; Social Security Administration (Fraud) Act 1997; Social Security Act 1998; Northern Ireland Act 1998; Social Security Contributions (Transfer of Functions, etc.) Act 1999; Tax Credits Act 1999; Welfare Reform and Pensions Act 1999; Child Support, Pensions and Social Security Act 2000; State Pension Credit Act 2002; National Insurance Contributions Act 2002; Tax Credits Act 2002; Secretaries of State for Education and Skills and for Work and Pensions Order 2002; Income Tax (Earnings and Pensions) Act 2003; Courts Act 2003; Civil Partnership Act 2004; Pensions Act 2004 (PPF Payments and FAS Payments) (Consequential Provisions) Order 2006; Taxation of Pension Schemes (Consequential Amendments) Order 2006; Income Tax Act 2007; Welfare Reform Act 2007; Pensions Act 2007; Welfare Reform Act 2009; Taxation (International and Other Provisions) Act 2010; Criminal Justice and Licensing (Scotland) Act 2010; Social Security (Electronic Communications) Order 2011; Welfare Reform Act 2012; Legal Aid, Sentencing and Punishment of Offenders Act 2012; Universal Credit (Consequential, Supplementary, Incidental and Miscellaneous Provisions) Regulations 2013; Marriage (Same Sex Couples) Act 2013 (Consequential and Contrary Provisions and Scotland) Order 2014; Crime and Courts Act 2013 (Family Court: Consequential Provision) Order 2014; Marriage and Civil Partnership (Scotland) Act 2014 and Civil Partnership Act 2004 (Consequential Provisions and Modifications) Order 2014; Welfare Reform and Work Act 2016; Bankruptcy (Scotland) Act 2016 (Consequential Provisions and Modifications) Order 2016; Civil Partnership (Opposite-sex Couples) Regulations 2019

Status: Amended

Text of statute as originally enacted

Revised text of statute as amended

Text of the Jobseekers Act 1995 as in force today (including any amendments) within the United Kingdom, from legislation.gov.uk.

The Jobseekers Act 1995 (c. 18) is an act of the Parliament of the United Kingdom, which empowers the government to provide unemployment income insurance, or "Jobseeker's Allowance" while people are looking for work.

In its current form, jobseeker's allowance is available without any means testing (i.e., inquiry into people's income or assets) for people who have paid into the National Insurance fund in at least the last two years. People can claim this for up to 182 days. After this, one's income and assets are means tested.

If people do not have enough in National Insurance Contributions (e.g., because they have just left school or university), the other kind of Jobseeker's allowance, income-based, is being phased out and replaced by universal credit, started by the Welfare Reform Act 2012. This requires means-testing.

== Provisions ==
=== Part I - Sections 1 to 25 ===
Sections 1 to 25 concern the Jobseeker's Allowance.

Claimants need to be "actively seeking work", which means taking at least three steps each week, rather than completing every action listed in the claimant commitment.

To qualify for JSA, a claimant must generally:

- Be available for work
- Be actively seeking employment
- Have a jobseeker’s agreement in force
- Not be in paid work
- Not be in full-time education
- Not have limited capability for work
- Be under pension age
- Be present in Great Britain

==== Types of JSA ====
There are two main types of JSA:

Contribution-Based JSA. Based on National Insurance (Class 1) contributions, claimant must:

- Have paid sufficient contributions in the previous two tax years
- Have earnings above minimum thresholds
- Not receive income support
- Time-limited: payable for a maximum of 182 days (6 months)

Income-Based JSA. Based on financial need. The claimant must:

- Have low or no income
- Not be receiving overlapping benefits (e.g. income support, pension credit)
- Meet age requirements (usually 18+)
- Can continue as long as financial conditions are met

==== Joint-Claim Couples ====
Couples may be required to claim jointly. These conditions apply to combined income and employment status of both partners. One partner is nominated to receive payments. This was introduced to prevent one partner claiming while the other avoids work.

==== Payable Amount ====
Payable amount depends on the age of the claimant, type of JSA (contribution-based or income-based), and income and earnings. If the income exists, the JSA is reduced accordingly. Payments below a prescribed minimum are not made.

==== Duration of Payments ====
Contribution-based JSA payments are limited to 182 days. They can be reclaimed only if new contribution years apply. Income-based JSA payments have no fixed time limit, and continues while eligibility conditions are met.

==== Regulation and Flexibility ====
Many details such as rates, deductions, and exceptions are set by a secondary legislation. This allows the Government to adjust eligibility, modify conditions for special groups, and integrate JSA into broader welfare forms.

==== Joint-Claim Couples and Trade Disputes ====
When a couple claims JSA together, the entitlement depends on both partners' behaviour. If both are disqualified, such as in the event of trade dispute rules, no JSA is claimed. However, if only one partner is disqualified, the couple may still be eligible to receive JSA.

Trade disputes do not automatically bar a joint-claim couple. Income calculations are adjusted to reflect one partner being disqualified and household responsibility rather than individual fault. The purpose is to prevent one partners' work dispute from unfairly removing all household support.

==== Young People (16-17) and Severe Hardship ====
This section applies to:

- Individuals aged 16-17
- Not entitled to JSA or Income Support
- Registered for training but has not received any
- At risk of severe hardship

The Secretary of State can direct payment of JSA for a limited period of time, and direction can be either time-limited or revoked if circumstances change. Support can be removed on refusal of training without good reason, failure to apply for a training place or misrepresentation of facts.

==== Reduced Payments for Young People ====
Payments can be reduced when a young person drops out of training, fails to attend without good reason, or loses a place due to misconduct. In safeguarding, if the young person shows "good reason", reductions should not apply.

=== Part II - Sections 26 to 29 ===
Sections 26 to 29 concern Back to Work Schemes.

=== Part III - Sections 30-41 ===
Sections 30 to 41 are Miscellaneous and Supplemental provisions.

== See also ==
- UK labour law
- Unemployment in the United Kingdom
- Universal credit
