= Social Security Contributions and Benefits Act 1992 =

Act of the Parliament of the United Kingdom

Social Security Contributions and Benefits Act 1992 (Note: Section 177(1).)
- Act of Parliament
- Parliament of the United Kingdom
- Long title: An Act to consolidate certain enactments relating to social security contributions and benefits with amendments to give effect to recommendations of the Law Commission and the Scottish Law Commission.
- Citation: 1992 c. 4
- Territorial extent: England and Wales; Scotland; Northern Ireland (in part); (Note: Section 177(5)–(6).)

Dates
- Royal assent: 13 February 1992
- Commencement: 1 July 1992 (Note: Section 177(4).)

Other legislation
- Amended by: List: Social Security Administration Act 1992; Social Security (Consequential Provisions) Act 1992; Local Government Finance Act 1992; Still-Birth (Definition) Act 1992; Social Security (Industrial Injuries) (Dependency) (Permitted Earnings Limits) Order 1992; Social Security Act 1993; Pension Schemes Act 1993; Social Security (Contributions) (Re-rating) Order 1993; Training for Work (Miscellaneous Provisions) Order 1993; Social Security Benefits Up-rating Order 1993; Statutory Sick Pay (Rate of Payment) Order 1993; Social Security (Industrial Injuries) (Dependency) (Permitted Earnings Limits) Order 1993; Social Security (Contributions) (Miscellaneous Amendments) Regulations 1993; Social Security (Contributions) Act 1994; Statutory Sick Pay Act 1994; Finance Act 1994; Social Security (Incapacity for Work) Act 1994; Local Government (Wales) Act 1994; Local Government etc. (Scotland) Act 1994; Social Security Benefits Up-rating Order 1994; Social Security (Contributions) (Re-rating and National Insurance Fund Payments) Order 1994; Statutory Sick Pay (Rate of Payment) Order 1994; Social Security (Contributions) (Miscellaneous Amendments) Regulations 1994; Maternity Allowance and Statutory Maternity Pay Regulations 1994; Social Security (Industrial Injuries) (Prescribed Diseases) Amendment Regulations 1994; Social Security (Severe Disablement Allowance and Invalid Care Allowance) Amendment Regulations 1994; Jobseekers Act 1995; Pensions Act 1995; Private International Law (Miscellaneous Provisions) Act 1995; Statutory Sick Pay Percentage Threshold Order 1995; Social Security Benefits Up-rating Order 1995; Social Security (Contributions) (Re–rating and National Insurance Fund Payments) Order 1995; Social Security (Industrial Injuries) (Dependency) (Permitted Earnings Limits) Order 1995; Finance Act 1996; Employment Rights Act 1996; Asylum and Immigration Act 1996; Housing Act 1996; Local Government Reorganisation (Wales) (Consequential Amendments) Order 1996; Social Security (Contributions) (Re-rating and National Insurance Fund Payments) Order 1996; Social Security Benefits Up-rating Order 1996; Social Security (Industrial Injuries) (Dependency) (Permitted Earnings Limits) Order 1996; Social Security Administration (Fraud) Act 1997; Social Security Benefits Up-rating Order 1997; Social Security (Contributions) (Re-rating and National Insurance Fund Payments) Order 1997; Social Security (Industrial Injuries) (Dependency) (Permitted Earnings Limits) Order 1997; Social Security Act 1998; Petroleum Act 1998; Social Security (Contributions) (Re-rating and National Insurance Fund Payments) Order 1998; Social Security Benefits Up-rating Order 1998; Social Security (Industrial Injuries) (Dependency) (Permitted Earnings Limits) Order 1998; Social Security Contributions (Transfer of Functions, etc.) Act 1999; Tax Credits Act 1999; Welfare Reform and Pensions Act 1999; Immigration and Asylum Act 1999; Social Security (Contributions) (Re-rating and National Insurance Fund Payments) Order 1999; Social Security Benefits Up-rating Order 1999; Social Security Benefits Up-rating (No. 2) Order 1999; Social Security (Industrial Injuries) (Dependency) (Permitted Earnings Limits) Order 1999; Social Security Contributions (Transfer of Functions, etc.) (Northern Ireland) Order 1999; Limited Liability Partnerships Act 2000; Child Support, Pensions and Social Security Act 2000; Local Government Act 2000; Health Act 1999 (Supplementary, Consequential etc. Provisions) Order 2000; Social Security Benefits Up-rating Order 2000; Social Security (Contributions) (Re-rating and National Insurance Funds Payments) Order 2000; Social Security (Benefits for Widows and Widowers) (Consequential Amendments) Regulations 2000; Capital Allowances Act 2001; Health and Social Care Act 2001; Social Security Benefits Up-rating (No. 2) Order 2000; Social Security (Contributions) (Re-rating and National Insurance Funds Payments) Order 2001; Social Security (Industrial Injuries) (Dependency) (Permitted Earnings Limits) Order 2001; Social Security Contributions and Benefits Act 1992 (Modification of Section 10(7)) Regulations 2001; State Pension Credit Act 2002; National Insurance Contributions Act 2002; Tax Credits Act 2002; Employment Act 2002; Social Security Benefits Up-rating Order 2002; Social Security (Industrial Injuries) (Dependency) (Permitted Earnings Limits) Order 2002; Social Security (Contributions) (Re-rating and National Insurance Funds Payments) Order 2002; Secretaries of State for Education and Skills and for Work and Pensions Order 2002; Regulatory Reform (Carer's Allowance) Order 2002; Fixed-term Employees (Prevention of Less Favourable Treatment) Regulations 2002; Income Tax (Earnings and Pensions) Act 2003; Finance Act 2003; Social Security (Industrial Injuries) (Dependency) (Permitted Earnings Limits) Order 2003; Social Security (Contributions) (Re-rating and National Insurance Funds Payments) Order 2003; Social Security Contributions and Benefits Act 1992 (Modification of Section 4A) Order 2003; National Insurance Contributions and Statutory Payments Act 2004; Finance Act 2004; Civil Partnership Act 2004; Pensions Act 2004; Social Security Benefits Up-rating Order 2004; Social Security (Industrial Injuries) (Dependency) (Permitted Earnings Limits) Order 2004; Social Security (Contributions) (Re-rating and National Insurance Funds Payments) Order 2004; Child Benefit and Guardian's Allowance Up-rating Order 2004; Income Tax (Trading and Other Income) Act 2005; Child Benefit Act 2005; Commissioners for Revenue and Customs Act 2005; Mental Health (Care and Treatment) (Scotland) Act 2003 (Modification of Enactments) Order 2005; Social Security Benefits Up-rating Order 2005; Social Security (Industrial Injuries) (Dependency) (Permitted Earnings Limits) Order 2005; Child Benefit and Guardian's Allowance Up-rating Order 2005; Social Security (Contributions) (Re-rating and National Insurance Funds Payments) Order 2005; Civil Partnership (Pensions and Benefit Payments) (Consequential, etc. Provisions) Order 2005; Mental Health (Care and Treatment) (Scotland) Act 2003 (Consequential Provisions) Order 2005; Civil Partnership (Miscellaneous and Consequential Provisions) Order 2005; National Insurance Contributions Act 2006; Work and Families Act 2006; National Health Service (Consequential Provisions) Act 2006; Pensions Act 2004 (PPF Payments and FAS Payments) (Consequential Provisions) Order 2006; Social Security (Contributions) (Re-rating and National Insurance Funds Payments) Order 2006; Social Security Benefits Up-rating Order 2006; Social Security (Industrial Injuries) (Dependency) (Permitted Earnings Limits) Order 2006; Taxation of Pension Schemes (Consequential Amendments) Order 2006; Guardian's Allowance Up-rating Order 2006; Employment Equality (Age) Regulations 2006; Adoption and Children Act 2002 (Consequential Amendment to Statutory Adoption Pay) Order 2006; Income Tax Act 2007; Welfare Reform Act 2007; Pensions Act 2007; Social Security Benefits Up-rating Order 2007; Social Security (Industrial Injuries) (Dependency) (Permitted Earnings Limits) Order 2007; Social Security Contributions and Benefits Act 1992 (Modification of Section 10(7B)) Regulations 2007; Employment Equality (Age) (Consequential Amendments) Regulations 2007; Social Security (Contributions) (Re-rating and National Insurance Funds Payments) Order 2007; Guardian's Allowance Up-rating Order 2007; Social Security Contributions and Benefits Act 1992 (Modification of Section 4A) Order 2007; Health and Social Care Act 2008; National Insurance Contributions Act 2008; Pensions Act 2008; Social Security (Contributions) (Re-rating) Order 2008; Social Security Benefits Up-rating Order 2008; Guardian's Allowance Up-rating Order 2008; Employment and Support Allowance (Consequential Provisions) (No. 2) Regulations 2008; Welfare Reform Act 2009; Transfer of Tribunal Functions and Revenue and Customs Appeals Order 2009; Social Security (Contributions) (Re-rating) Order 2009; Social Security (Industrial Injuries) (Dependency) (Permitted Earnings Limits) Order 2009; Guardian's Allowance Up-rating Order 2009; National Insurance Contribution Credits (Transfer of Functions) Order 2009; Savings Accounts and Health in Pregnancy Grant Act 2010; Income Tax Act 2007 (Amendment) Order 2010; Social Security (Industrial Injuries) (Dependency) (Permitted Earnings Limits) Order 2010; Social Security (Miscellaneous Amendments) (No. 3) Regulations 2010; National Insurance Contributions Act 2011; Finance Act 2011; Pensions Act 2011; Finance Act 2009, Sections 101 to 103 (Income Tax Self Assessment) (Appointed Days and Transitional and Consequential Provisions) Order 2011; Finance Act 2009, Schedules 55 and 56 (Income Tax Self Assessment and Pension Schemes) (Appointed Days and Consequential and Savings Provisions) Order 2011; Social Security Benefits Up-rating Order 2011; Social Security (Industrial Injuries) (Dependency) (Permitted Earnings Limits) Order 2011; Social Security (Contributions) (Re-rating) Order 2011; Guardian's Allowance Up-rating Order 2011; Adoption and Children (Scotland) Act 2007 (Consequential Modifications) Order 2011; Social Security (Disability Living Allowance, Attendance Allowance and Carer's Allowance) (Miscellaneous Amendments) Regulations 2011; Welfare Reform Act 2012; Health and Social Care Act 2012; Finance Act 2012; Social Security Benefits Up-rating Order 2012; Social Security (Contributions) (Re-rating) Order 2012; Social Security (Industrial Injuries) (Dependency) (Permitted Earnings Limits) Order 2012; Guardian's Allowance Up-rating Order 2012; Crime and Courts Act 2013; Marriage (Same Sex Couples) Act 2013; Personal Independence Payment (Supplementary Provisions and Consequential Amendments) Regulations 2013; Social Security (Contributions) (Re-rating) Order 2013; Social Security Benefits Up-rating Order 2013; Guardian's Allowance Up-rating Order 2013; Armed Forces and Reserve Forces (Compensation Scheme) (Consequential Provisions: Primary Legislation) Order 2013; Children's Hearings (Scotland) Act 2011 (Consequential and Transitional Provisions and Savings) Order 2013; Children and Families Act 2014; National Insurance Contributions Act 2014; Pensions Act 2014; Welfare Benefits Up-rating Order 2014; Social Security (Contributions) (Re-rating and National Insurance Funds Payments) Order 2014; Social Security Benefits Up-rating Order 2014; Marriage (Same Sex Couples) Act 2013 (Consequential and Contrary Provisions and Scotland) Order 2014; Social Security (Maternity Allowance) (Participating Wife or Civil Partner of Self-employed Earner) Regulations 2014; Guardian's Allowance Up-rating Order 2014; Finance Act 2009, Sections 101 and 102 (Interest on Late Payments and Repayments) (Consequential Amendments) Order 2014; Social Security Class 3A Contributions (Amendment) Regulations 2014; Marriage (Same Sex Couples) Act 2013 (Consequential and Contrary Provisions and Scotland) and Marriage and Civil Partnership (Scotland) Act 2014 (Consequential Provisions) Order 2014; Pensions Act 2014 (Consequential Amendments) (Units of Additional Pension) Order 2014; Marriage and Civil Partnership (Scotland) Act 2014 and Civil Partnership Act 2004 (Consequential Provisions and Modifications) Order 2014; National Insurance Contributions Act 2015; Finance Act 2015; Welfare Benefits Up-rating Order 2015; Guardian's Allowance Up-rating Order 2015; Social Security Benefits Up-rating Order 2015; Social Security (Contributions) (Re-rating and National Insurance Funds Payments) Order 2015; Care Act 2014 and Children and Families Act 2014 (Consequential Amendments) Order 2015; Universal Credit and Miscellaneous Amendments Regulations 2015; Private Housing (Tenancies) (Scotland) Act 2016; Scotland Act 2016; Finance Act 2016; Pensions Act 2014 (Consequential and Supplementary Amendments) Order 2016; Social Security Benefits Up-rating Order 2016; Social Security (Contributions) (Limits and Thresholds Amendments and National Insurance Funds Payments) Regulations 2016; Social Services and Well-being (Wales) Act 2014 (Consequential Amendments) Regulations 2016; Social Security Benefits Up-rating Order 2017; Tax Credits and Guardian's Allowance Up-rating etc. Regulations 2017; Social Security (Contributions) (Rates, Limits and Thresholds Amendments and National Insurance Funds Payments) Regulations 2017; Parental Bereavement (Leave and Pay) Act 2018; Social Security Benefits Up-rating Order 2018; Social Security (Contributions) (Rates, Limits and Thresholds Amendments and National Insurance Funds Payments) Regulations 2018; Tax Credits and Guardian's Allowance Up-rating etc. Regulations 2018; Social Security (Updating of EU References) (Amendment) Regulations 2018; Human Fertilisation and Embryology Act 2008 (Remedial) Order 2018; National Insurance Contributions (Termination Awards and Sporting Testimonials) Act 2019; Carer's Allowance Up-rating (Scotland) Order 2019; Social Security (Amendment) (EU Exit) Regulations 2019; Tax Credits and Guardian's Allowance Up-rating Regulations 2019; Social Security (Contributions) (Rates, Limits and Thresholds Amendments and National Insurance Funds Payments) Regulations 2019; Social Security Benefits Up-rating Order 2019; Civil Partnership (Opposite-sex Couples) Regulations 2019; Marriage (Same-sex Couples) and Civil Partnership (Opposite-sex Couples) (Northern Ireland) Regulations 2019; Coronavirus Act 2020; Carer's Allowance Up-rating (Scotland) Order 2020; Social Security Benefits Up-rating Order 2020; Tax Credits, Child Benefit and Guardian's Allowance Up-rating Regulations 2020; Social Security (Contributions) (Rates, Limits and Thresholds Amendments and National Insurance Funds Payments) Regulations 2020; Marriage and Civil Partnership (Northern Ireland) (No. 2) Regulations 2020; Finance Act 2021; Tax Credits, Child Benefit and Guardian's Allowance Up-rating Regulations 2021; Social Security (Contributions) (Rates, Limits and Thresholds Amendments and National Insurance Funds Payments) Regulations 2021; Social Security Benefits Up-rating Order 2021; Social Security Up-rating (Scotland) Order 2021; Disability Assistance for Children and Young People (Scotland) Regulations 2021; Scotland Act 2016 (Social Security) (Consequential Provision) (Miscellaneous Amendment) Regulations 2021; Social Security (Amendment) Regulations 2021; Social Security (Scotland) Act 2018 (Disability Assistance for Children and Young People) (Consequential Modifications) (No. 2) Order 2021; National Insurance Contributions (Increase of Thresholds) Act 2022; Social Security (Special Rules for End of Life) Act 2022; Disability Assistance for Working Age People (Scotland) Regulations 2022; Social Security Up-rating (Scotland) Order 2022; Tax Credits, Child Benefit and Guardian's Allowance Up-rating Regulations 2022; Social Security (Contributions) (Rates, Limits and Thresholds Amendments and National Insurance Funds Payments) Regulations 2022; Social Security Benefits Up-rating Order 2022; Social Security (Scotland) Act 2018 (Disability Assistance and Information-Sharing) (Consequential Provision and Modifications) Order 2022; Scotland Act 2016 (Social Security) (Adult Disability Payment and Child Disability Payment) (Amendment) Regulations 2022; Renting Homes (Wales) Act 2016 (Consequential Amendments) Regulations 2022; Social Security (Class 2 National Insurance Contributions Increase of Threshold) Regulations 2022; Neonatal Care (Leave and Pay) Act 2023; Veterans Advisory and Pensions Committees Act 2023; National Insurance Contributions (Reduction in Rates) Act 2023; Social Security Up-rating (Scotland) Order 2023; Bereavement Benefits (Remedial) Order 2023; Social Security (Contributions) (Rates, Limits and Thresholds Amendments and National Insurance Funds Payments) Regulations 2023; Tax Credits, Child Benefit and Guardian's Allowance Up-rating Regulations 2023; Social Security Benefits Up-rating Order 2023; Carer's Assistance (Carer Support Payment) (Scotland) Regulations 2023 (Consequential Modifications) Order 2023; National Insurance Contributions (Reduction in Rates) Act 2024; Social Security Up-rating (Scotland) Order 2024; Disability Assistance for Older People (Scotland) Regulations 2024; Social Security Benefits Up-rating Order 2024; Tax Credits, Child Benefit and Guardian's Allowance Up-rating Regulations 2024; Social Security (Class 2 National Insurance Contributions) (Consequential Amendments and Savings) Regulations 2024; Social Security (Scotland) Act 2018 (Disability Assistance) (Consequential Modifications) Order 2024; Disability Assistance (Scottish Adult Disability Living Allowance) Regulations 2025; National Insurance Contributions (Secondary Class 1 Contributions) Act 2025; Employment Rights Act 2025; Social Security Up-rating (Scotland) Order 2025; Social Security (Scotland) Act 2018 (Scottish Adult Disability Living Allowance) (Consequential Modifications) Order 2025; Social Security (Contributions) (Rates, Limits and Thresholds Amendments, National Insurance Funds Payments and Extension of Veteran's Relief) Regulations 2025; Child Benefit and Guardian's Allowance Up-rating Order 2025; Social Security Benefits Up-rating Order 2025; Carer's Assistance (Miscellaneous and Consequential Amendments, Revocation, Transitional and Saving Provisions) (Scotland) Regulations 2025; Finance Act 2026; National Insurance Contributions (Employer Pensions Contributions) Act 2026; Social Security Benefits Up-rating Order 2026; Social Security Up-rating (Scotland) Order 2026; Social Security (Contributions) (Rates, Limits and Thresholds Amendments, National Insurance Funds Payments and Extension of Veteran's Relief) Regulations 2026; Child Benefit and Guardian's Allowance Up-rating Order 2026; Social Security (Scotland) Act 2018 (Carer's Assistance) (Consequential Modifications) Order 2026; Social Security Contributions and Benefits Act 1992 (Modification of Section 4A) Order 2026
- Relates to: Social Security Administration Act 1992; Social Security (Consequential Provisions) Act 1992; Social Security Contributions and Benefits (Northern Ireland) Act 1992; Social Security Administration (Northern Ireland) Act 1992; Social Security (Consequential Provisions) (Northern Ireland) Act 1992

Status: Amended

Text of statute as originally enacted

Revised text of statute as amended

Text of the Social Security Contributions and Benefits Act 1992 as in force today (including any amendments) within the United Kingdom, from legislation.gov.uk.

The Social Security Contributions and Benefits Act 1992 (c. 4) is an act of the Parliament of the United Kingdom. The act is the primary legislation concerning the state retirement provision, accident insurance, statutory sick pay and maternity pay in the United Kingdom.

The enactments consolidated by the act were repealed, in consequence of the consolidation, by the Social Security (Consequential Provisions) Act 1992.

The Social Security Contributions and Benefits (Northern Ireland) Act 1992 made equivalent provisions for Northern Ireland.

== Provisions ==
- Part I Contributions
- Part II Contributory benefits
- Part III Non-contributory benefits
- Part IV Increases for dependants
- Part V Benefit for industrial injuries
- Part VI Miscellaneous provisions relating to Parts I to V
- Part VII Income-related benefits
- Part VIII The Social Fund
- Part IX Child Benefit
- Part X Christmas bonus for pensioners
- Part XI Statutory sick pay
- Part XII Statutory maternity pay (ss 164-171)
- Part XIII General

=== Schedules ===
- Schedule 1 Supplementary provisions relating to contributions of Classes 1, 1A, 2 and 3.
- Schedule 2 Levy of Class 4 contributions with income tax.
- Schedule 3 Contribution conditions for entitlement to benefit.
- Schedule 4 Rates of benefits, etc.
- Schedule 5 Increase of pension where entitlement is deferred.
- Schedule 6 Assessment of extent of disablement.
- Schedule 7 Industrial injuries benefits.
- Schedule 8 Industrial injuries and diseases (old cases).
- Schedule 9 Exclusions from entitlement to child benefit.
- Schedule 10 Priority between persons entitled to child benefit.
- Schedule 11 Circumstances in which periods of entitlement to statutory sick pay do not arise.
- Schedule 12 Relationship of statutory sick pay with benefits and other payments, etc.
- Schedule 13 Relationship of statutory maternity pay with benefits and other payments etc.

== See also ==
- UK labour law
- Pensions in the United Kingdom
- Pensions Act 1995
