= National Insurance Contributions Act 2008 =

Act of the Parliament of the United Kingdom

National Insurance Contributions Act 2008 (Note: Section 7.)
- Act of Parliament
- Parliament of the United Kingdom
- Long title: An Act to make provision in connection with the upper earnings limit for national insurance contributions (including in particular provision about the upper accrual point).
- Citation: 2008 c. 16
- Introduced by: Alistair Darling (Commons); Lord McKenzie of Luton (Lords)
- Territorial extent: United Kingdom (Note: Section 5.)

Dates
- Royal assent: 21 July 2008
- Commencement: 21 September 2008 (except paragraph 6(3) of schedule 1, and schedule 2 so far as relating to the repeals mentioned in that paragraph); (Note: Section 6.)
Other legislation
Amends	Social Security Contributions and Benefits Act 1992; Social Security Contributions and Benefits (Northern Ireland) Act 1992; Pension Schemes Act 1993; Pensions Act 2007

Status: Current legislation

History of passage through Parliament

Text of statute as originally enacted

Text of the National Insurance Contributions Act 2008 as in force today (including any amendments) within the United Kingdom, from legislation.gov.uk.

The National Insurance Contributions Act 2008 (c. 16) is an act of the Parliament of the United Kingdom which amends the law in relation to National insurance contribution.

== Provisions ==
The act harmonised the National Insurance upper earnings limit with the threshold for higher rate income tax. The Government described the legislation as creating one of the simplest personal tax structures among developed countries.

== Reception ==
The Conservative spokesperson, David Gauke, criticised the legislation for in his view, leading to individuals paying more in national insurance contributions, but not receiving additional benefit as a consequence.

== Extent and commencement ==
Section 5(3) provides that sections 4, 6 and 7 and section 5 extend to each part of the United Kingdom.

Section 6(2) provides that paragraph 6(3) of Schedule 1, and Schedule 2 so far as relating to the repeals mentioned in that paragraph, come into force on the day appointed by an order under section 30(2) of the Pensions Act 2007 for the coming into force of paragraph 45(2) of Schedule 4 to that Act.

Section 6(1) provides that the rest of the act came into force at the end of the period of two months that began on the date on which it was passed. The word "months" means calendar months. The day (that is to say, 21 July 2008) on which the act was passed (that is to say, received royal assent) is included in the period of two months. This means that the rest of the act came into force on 21 September 2008.

== Bibliography ==
- Halsbury's Statutes
- Current Law Statutes Annotated 2008
