= Pension Schemes Act 1993 =

Act of the Parliament of the United Kingdom

Pension Schemes Act 1993 (Note: Section 193(1).)
- Act of Parliament
- Parliament of the United Kingdom
- Long title: An Act to consolidate certain enactments relating to pension schemes with amendments to give effect to recommendations of the Law Commission and the Scottish Law Commission.
- Citation: 1993 c. 48
- Introduced by: Lord Mackay of Clashfern, Lord Chancellor (Lords)
- Territorial extent: England and Wales; Scotland; Northern Ireland (in part); (Note: Section 192.)

Dates
- Royal assent: 5 November 1993
- Commencement: 7 February 1994 (except part II of sch. 5 and sch. 7; and ss. 181(1) & 190 as far as they relate to those schedules) (Note: Section 193(2)–(3). The Pension Schemes Act 1993 (Commencement No. 1) Order 1994 (SI 1994/86).)
Other legislation
Amends	Attachment of Earnings Act 1971; Pensions (Increase) Act 1971; Rent Act 1977; Official Secrets Act 1989; Social Security Contributions and Benefits Act 1992; Social Security Administration Act 1992; Judicial Pensions and Retirement Act 1993; See § Repealed enactments
Repeals/revokes	See § Repealed enactments
Amended by	Pensions Act 1995; Employment Tribunals Act 1996; Employment Rights Act 1996; Petroleum Act 1998; Statute Law (Repeals) Act 2004; Pensions Act 2004; Pensions Act 2007; National Insurance Contributions Act 2008; Pensions Act 2008; Marriage (Same Sex Couples) Act 2013; National Insurance Contributions Act 2014; Pensions Act 2014; Criminal Justice and Courts Act 2015; Pension Schemes Act 2021; Employment Rights Act 2025
Relates to	Pension Schemes (Northern Ireland) Act 1993

Status: Amended

Text of statute as originally enacted

Revised text of statute as amended

Text of the Pension Schemes Act 1993 as in force today (including any amendments) within the United Kingdom, from legislation.gov.uk.

The Pension Schemes Act 1993 (c. 48) is an act of the Parliament of the United Kingdom that concerns the administration of occupational pensions.

The Pension Schemes (Northern Ireland) Act 1993 made equivalent provisions for Northern Ireland.

== Background ==
The act was the first statute to result from the comprehensive inquiry led by Roy Goode resulting in the command paper, Pension Law Reform.

== Provisions ==
Part I contains section 1 that sets out the three pillars, or categories of UK pensions: occupational pensions, personal or private pensions and the public or state pension.

Part II concerned administration of the pension system under an "Occupational Pensions Board", though this has now been replaced by the Pensions Regulator under the Pensions Act 2004.

Part III in sections 7 to 68 concerns the certification of pension schemes, and the rule that people with entitlement to such schemes get reduced state benefits, and other effects.

Part IV in sections 69 to 101 sets out minimum protection for early leavers from their jobs before an entitlement to an occupational pension arises.

Part V in sections 102 to 110 requires that pension schemes contain annual increases in line with prices, though sections 102 to 108 were soon replaced by the Pensions Act 1995.

Part VI in sections 111 to 118 contains further protections for scheme members regarding voluntary contributions and disclosure.

Part VII, in sections 119 to 128, set out the rules for insolvent schemes and the duty of the Secretary of State to reimburse employees, but was then replaced by the Pensions Act 1995..

Part VIII contains rules on the relationship between requirements of the act and scheme rules, insofar as they are overridden by the act. Part IX relates to how scheme trust deeds can be modified. Part X relates to investigations by the Pensions Ombudsman. Part X contains miscellaneous provisions, and Part XII holds supplementary provisions.

=== Repealed enactments ===
Sections 188(1) and 188(2) of the act repealed 32 enactments and revoked 6 instruments, listed in parts I, II and III, and part IV, of schedule 5 to the act, respectively.

Part I – General
Citation	Short title	Extent of repeal
1973 c. 38	Social Security Act 1973	Section 51(3)(b), (5) and (10).
1973 c. 38	Social Security Act 1973	Section 52(8).
1973 c. 38	Social Security Act 1973	Section 58(1) to (2B).
1973 c. 38	Social Security Act 1973	Section 59(1).
1973 c. 38	Social Security Act 1973	Sections 63 to 68.
1973 c. 38	Social Security Act 1973	In section 69, subsections (1) to (6).
1973 c. 38	Social Security Act 1973	Sections 71 and 72.
1973 c. 38	Social Security Act 1973	Section 86.
1973 c. 38	Social Security Act 1973	In section 96(1), the words from "(except" to "Part II)".
1973 c. 38	Social Security Act 1973	In section 99, subsection (5) and in subsection (17) the word "68" and the words "or regulations" in both places where they occur.
1973 c. 38	Social Security Act 1973	Schedules 16 and 17.
1974 c. 14	National Insurance Act 1974	Section 6(4).
1975 c. 18	Social Security (Consequential Provisions) Act 1975	In Schedule 2, paragraph 52.
1975 c. 60	Social Security Pensions Act 1975	Sections 26 to 58B.
1975 c. 60	Social Security Pensions Act 1975	Sections 59B to 60B.
1975 c. 60	Social Security Pensions Act 1975	In section 61(2), paragraphs (a) and (b) and the words from "regulations under" to "or".
1975 c. 60	Social Security Pensions Act 1975	Section 61A.
1975 c. 60	Social Security Pensions Act 1975	Section 62(4).
1975 c. 60	Social Security Pensions Act 1975	Section 63(2)(g).
1975 c. 60	Social Security Pensions Act 1975	Section 66.
1975 c. 60	Social Security Pensions Act 1975	In section 68(4), the words from the beginning to "Ireland; and" and paragraphs (a) and (b).
1975 c. 60	Social Security Pensions Act 1975	Schedules 1A, 2, 3 and 3A.
1975 c. 60	Social Security Pensions Act 1975	In Schedule 4, paragraphs 2 and 23 to 29 and 31 to 33.
1976 c. 35	Police Pensions Act 1976	In Schedule 2, paragraph 11.
1977 c. 5	Social Security (Miscellaneous Provisions) Act 1977	Section 3(2).
1977 c. 5	Social Security (Miscellaneous Provisions) Act 1977	Section 21.
1977 c. 5	Social Security (Miscellaneous Provisions) Act 1977	Section 22(7), (8), (13), (14).
1978 c. 44	Employment Protection (Consolidation) Act 1978	Section 123.
1978 c. 44	Employment Protection (Consolidation) Act 1978	In section 124, subsection (2) and in subsection (3) the words "or 123".
1978 c. 44	Employment Protection (Consolidation) Act 1978	Section 125(3) to (3B).
1978 c. 44	Employment Protection (Consolidation) Act 1978	In section 126(1), the words "or 123" and "or contributions to an occupational pension scheme falling to be made".
1978 c. 44	Employment Protection (Consolidation) Act 1978	In section 127(3), the definition of "occupational pension scheme" and the words following it.
1978 c. 44	Employment Protection (Consolidation) Act 1978	In section 144(4), the words "and 123".
1979 c. 18	Social Security Act 1979	Section 18.
1979 c. 18	Social Security Act 1979	In Schedule 3, paragraphs 3 and 18.
1980 c. 30	Social Security Act 1980	Section 3(4), (7) to (10) and (12).
1981 c. 33	Social Security Act 1981	In Schedule 2, paragraph 1.
1982 c. 24	Social Security and Housing Benefits Act 1982	Section 40.
1982 c. 24	Social Security and Housing Benefits Act 1982	In Schedule 4, paragraphs 20 and 21.
1984 c. 48	Health and Social Security Act 1984	Sections 19 and 20.
1984 c. 48	Health and Social Security Act 1984	Schedule 6.
1984 c. 48	Health and Social Security Act 1984	In Schedule 7, paragraphs 4 and 5.
1985 c. 53	Social Security Act 1985	Sections 1 to 6.
1985 c. 53	Social Security Act 1985	Section 26.
1985 c. 53	Social Security Act 1985	Section 28(2).
1985 c. 53	Social Security Act 1985	Schedules 1 to 3.
1985 c. 53	Social Security Act 1985	In Schedule 5, paragraphs 1, 3, 4, 17, 18, 20, 21, 23 to 27, 29 to 32, 34 and 36.
1985 c. 65	Insolvency Act 1985	In Schedule 8, paragraphs 26 and 31(3).
1985 c. 66	Bankruptcy (Scotland) Act 1985	In Schedule 7, paragraph 13.
1986 c. 45	Insolvency Act 1986	In Schedule 14, the entries relating to the Social Security Pensions Act 1975.
1986 c. 50	Social Security Act 1986	Sections 1 to 8.
1986 c. 50	Social Security Act 1986	Section 9(1) to (7).
1986 c. 50	Social Security Act 1986	Sections 10 to 17A.
1986 c. 50	Social Security Act 1986	Section 52(1) and (2).
1986 c. 50	Social Security Act 1986	Sections 59 to 61.
1986 c. 50	Social Security Act 1986	Section 75.
1986 c. 50	Social Security Act 1986	Sections 78 to 80.
1986 c. 50	Social Security Act 1986	Section 83(3).
1986 c. 50	Social Security Act 1986	In section 84; in subsection (1), the definitions of "average salary benefits", "contract of service", "employed earner", "employer", "employee", "insurance company", "minimum contributions", "money purchase benefits", "occupational pension scheme", "personal pension scheme", "protected rights", "tax exemption", "tax approval" and "tax year" and subsection (2).
1986 c. 50	Social Security Act 1986	Section 85(3), (8) and (8A).
1986 c. 50	Social Security Act 1986	Section 87(1)(a).
1986 c. 50	Social Security Act 1986	Schedules 1 and 2.
1986 c. 50	Social Security Act 1986	In Schedule 5, in Part I, paragraph 1 and in Part II, paragraph (a).
1986 c. 50	Social Security Act 1986	In Schedule 8, paragraphs 4 and 8 to 11.
1986 c. 50	Social Security Act 1986	In Schedule 10, paragraphs 2 to 9, 12 to 31 and 82.
1988 c. 7	Social Security Act 1988	Section 9.
1988 c. 7	Social Security Act 1988	In Schedule 2, paragraphs 1(2), (3), 2 and 3.
1988 c. 7	Social Security Act 1988	In Schedule 4, paragraph 22.
1989 c. 6	Official Secrets Act 1989	In Schedule 1, paragraph 1(d).
1989 c. 24	Social Security Act 1989	Section 7(6).
1989 c. 24	Social Security Act 1989	Section 20.
1989 c. 24	Social Security Act 1989	In Schedule 1, paragraph 11.
1989 c. 24	Social Security Act 1989	In Schedule 5, paragraphs 11 and 13.
1989 c. 24	Social Security Act 1989	In Schedule 6, paragraphs 1 to 5 and 8 to 20.
1989 c. 24	Social Security Act 1989	In Schedule 7, paragraphs 1 and 21.
1989 c. 24	Social Security Act 1989	In Schedule 8, paragraph 12(1)(a) and (b).
1989 c. 24	Social Security Act 1989	In Schedule 9, the entries relating to section 64(3)(dd) of the Social Security Act 1973 and sections 53 to 56 of the Social Security Pensions Act 1975.
1989 c. 38	Employment Act 1989	Section 19(2).
1990 c. 27	Social Security Act 1990	Sections 11 and 12(1).
1990 c. 27	Social Security Act 1990	Sections 13 and 14.
1990 c. 27	Social Security Act 1990	Section 22(2), (3).
1990 c. 27	Social Security Act 1990	In section 23(5), paragraph (a), in paragraph (b) the words "section 22 above and" and paragraph (d).
1990 c. 27	Social Security Act 1990	Schedules 2, 3 and 4.
1990 c. 41	Courts and Legal Services Act 1990	Section 82(2).
1992 c. 6	Social Security (Consequential Provisions) Act 1992	In Schedule 2, paragraphs 20 to 33, 35, 36, 40 to 42, 44, 49, 67 and 76 to 83.
1992 c. 52	Trade Union and Labour Relations (Consolidation) Act 1992	In Schedule 2, paragraph 5.
1993 c. 3	Social Security Act 1993	Section 1.
1993 c. 3	Social Security Act 1993	In section 5, in subsection (2) the words "section 1(1) and (2) and" and subsection (3).
1993 c. 8	Judicial Pensions and Retirement Act 1993	In Schedule 8, paragraphs 12 and 18.

Part II – Provisions relating to equal access
Citation	Short title	Extent of repeal
1993 c. 48	Pension Schemes Act 1993	Section 118.
1993 c. 48	Pension Schemes Act 1993	In section 132, the words "the equal access requirements".
1993 c. 48	Pension Schemes Act 1993	In section 133(1), the words "the equal access requirements".
1993 c. 48	Pension Schemes Act 1993	In section 134, in subsection (3), the words "the equal access requirements" and in subsection (4) the words "or the equal access requirements" and the words from "or as the case may be" onwards.
1993 c. 48	Pension Schemes Act 1993	In section 136(2)(e)(iv), the words "or the equal access requirements".
1993 c. 48	Pension Schemes Act 1993	In section 139(2), the words "the equal access requirements".
1993 c. 48	Pension Schemes Act 1993	In section 140(4), paragraph (c) and the word "and" immediately preceding it.
1993 c. 48	Pension Schemes Act 1993	Section 153(3) and (4).
1993 c. 48	Pension Schemes Act 1993	Section 170(5) and (6).
1993 c. 48	Pension Schemes Act 1993	In section 181(1), the definition of "equal access requirements".

Part III – Provisions repealed as respects Great Britain only
Citation	Short title	Extent of repeal
1973 c. 38	Social Security Act 1973	Section 51(3).
1973 c. 38	Social Security Act 1973	In section 69(7), the words from "but" onwards.
1973 c. 38	Social Security Act 1973	Section 89.
1973 c. 38	Social Security Act 1973	In section 96, in subsections (1), (2), (3) and (6) the words "regulations or".
1973 c. 38	Social Security Act 1973	In section 97, in subsection (3) the words "regulations and" and subsection (4).
1973 c. 38	Social Security Act 1973	In section 99, subsections (1) and (3).
1975 c. 18	Social Security (Consequential Provisions) Act 1975	In Schedule 2, paragraph 58.
1975 c. 60	Social Security Pensions Act 1975	In Schedule 4, paragraph 30.
1985 c. 53	Social Security Act 1985	In Schedule 5, paragraph 2.

Part IV – Subordinate legislation revoked
Citation	Title	Extent of revocation
SI 1987/1116	Personal and Occupational Pension Schemes (Modification of Enactments) Regulations 1987	All the Regulations.
SI 1988/474	Personal and Occupational Pension Schemes (Tax Approval and Miscellaneous Provisions) Regulations 1988	Regulation 8.
SI 1988/1016	Personal and Occupational Pension Schemes (Transfer to Self-employed Pension Arrangements) Regulations 1988	Regulation 4(2).
SI 1989/500	Personal and Occupational Pension Schemes (Miscellaneous Amendments) Regulations 1989	Regulation 3.
SI 1990/1141	Personal and Occupational Pension Schemes (Miscellaneous Amendments) Regulations 1990	Regulation 7.
SI 1992/795	Social Security (Class 1 Contributions – Contracted-out Percentages) Order 1992	The whole order.

== See also ==
- UK labour law
- Pensions in the United Kingdom
- Pensions Act 1995
- Pensions Act 2004
- Pensions Act 2008
