= Chemical Weapons Act 1996 =

Act of the Parliament of the United Kingdom

Chemical Weapons Act 1996 (Note: Section 39(4).)
- Act of Parliament
- Parliament of the United Kingdom
- Long title: An Act to promote the control of chemical weapons and of certain toxic chemicals and precursors; and for connected purposes.
- Citation: 1996 c. 6
- Territorial extent: United Kingdom (Note: Section 39(2).)

Dates
- Royal assent: 3 April 1996
- Commencement: 16 September 1996 (Note: Section 39(1). The Chemical Weapons Act 1996 (Commencement) Order 1996 (SI 1996/2054).)
Other legislation
Amends	Army Act 1955; Air Force Act 1955; Naval Discipline Act 1957
Amended by	Anti-terrorism, Crime and Security Act 2001; Justice (Northern Ireland) Act 2002; Commissioners for Revenue and Customs Act 2005; Public Bodies (Merger of the Director of Public Prosecutions and the Director of Revenue and Customs Prosecutions) Order 2014

Status: Amended

Text of statute as originally enacted

Text of the Chemical Weapons Act 1996 as in force today (including any amendments) within the United Kingdom, from legislation.gov.uk.

The Chemical Weapons Act 1996 (c. 6) is an act of the Parliament of the United Kingdom passed during the time of a Conservative government under John Major. It was adopted on the 3 April 1996 and came into force in 16 September 1996. This act was made so that the UK could be compliant with the 1993 Convention on the Prohibition of the Development, Production, Stockpiling and Use of Chemical Weapons and their Destruction. It also creates the criminal offence of producing, developing, handling or transferring chemical weapons. This act gives Britain extra territorial jurisdiction in regard to British nationals who are handling such material. This act applies to Isle of Man, Guernsey and to Jersey. The department of trade and industry acts as a liaison between the UK and the Organisation for the Prohibition of Chemical Weapons.

The general interpretation of chemical weapons according to this act is as follows:

1. "Toxic chemicals and their precursors"
2. "Munitions and other devices designed to cause death or harm through the toxic properties of toxic chemicals released by them"
3. And finally- "equipment designed for use in connection with munitions and devices falling within paragraph (b)"

There are some exceptions to these rules. For example, chemical weapons can be used for "peaceful purposes", "purposes related to protection against toxic chemicals", "legitimate military purposes", and "purposes of enforcing the law".

"Legitimate military purposes" are described as being military purposes, which do not cause harm to people, animals, or otherwise harm them.

Section 33 of the Chemical Weapons Act 1996 requires The secretary of State to prepare a document on the operation of this act and present it to Parliament annually.
