= Pensions Act 2007 =

Act of the Parliament of the United Kingdom

Pensions Act 2007 (Note: Section 31.)
- Act of Parliament
- Parliament of the United Kingdom
- Long title: An Act to make provision about pensions and other benefits payable to persons in connection with bereavement or by reference to pensionable age; to make provision about the establishment and functions of the Personal Accounts Delivery Authority; and for connected purposes.
- Citation: 2007 c. 22
- Introduced by: John Hutton MP, Secretary of State for Work and Pensions (Commons); Lord McKenzie of Luton, Parliamentary Under-Secretary of State, Department for Work and Pensions (Lords)
- Territorial extent: England and Wales; Scotland; Northern Ireland; (Note: Section 30.)

Dates
- Royal assent: 26 July 2007
- Commencement: Various (Note: Section 30.)
Other legislation
Amends	Social Security Contributions and Benefits Act 1992; Social Security Administration Act 1992; Social Security Contributions and Benefits (Northern Ireland) Act 1992; Pension Schemes Act 1993; Jobseekers Act 1995; Child Benefit Act 2005
Amended by	National Insurance Contributions Act 2008; Pensions Act 2008; Pensions Act 2011

Status: Amended

History of passage through Parliament

Text of statute as originally enacted

Revised text of statute as amended

The Pensions Act 2007 (c. 22) is an act of the Parliament of the United Kingdom. It incorporated the main findings of the all-party Pensions Commission in 2006 as set out in the white paper Security in retirement: towards a new pension system published in May 2006.

The main provisions were:

1. Reduction of the qualifying years for a full basic State Pension from 44 years for men and 39 years for women to 30 years for both.
2. Linking cost of living increases to earnings rather than prices.
3. changing the contribution conditions for basic State Pension so that it is easier for everyone to build up some entitlement.
4. replacing Home Responsibilities Protection (HRP) with a new system of weekly credits for parents and carers
5. Raising the pension age for women to 65 by 2020.
6. Raising the pension age for both women and men from 65 to 68 between 2024 and 2046.
7. Introducing national insurance credits for parents and carers so that they can build up some entitlement to the additional State Pension.
8. End of the option to contract out of the additional State Pension.

Modifications to this were made in the Pensions Act 2008.
