= Income Tax (Earnings and Pensions) Act 2003 =

Act of the Parliament of the United Kingdom

Income Tax (Earnings and Pensions) Act 2003 (Note: Section 725.)
- Act of Parliament
- Parliament of the United Kingdom
- Long title: An Act to restate, with minor changes, certain enactments relating to income tax on employment income, pension income and social security income; and for connected purposes.
- Citation: 2003 c. 1
- Territorial extent: United Kingdom

Dates
- Royal assent: 6 March 2003
- Commencement: 6 April 2003 (Note: Section 723.)
Other legislation
Amends	Finance Act 1969; Inheritance Tax Act 1984; Social Security Contributions and Benefits Act 1992; Social Security Administration Act 1992; Social Security (Consequential Provisions) Act 1992; Social Security Contributions and Benefits (Northern Ireland) Act 1992; Social Security Administration (Northern Ireland) Act 1992; Social Security (Consequential Provisions) (Northern Ireland) Act 1992; Pension Schemes (Northern Ireland) Act 1993; Jobseekers Act 1995; Capital Allowances Act 2001
Amended by	Work and Families Act 2006; Statute Law (Repeals) Act 2008; Scotland Act 2012; Co-operative and Community Benefit Societies Act 2014; Finance Act 2015; Corporate Insolvency and Governance Act 2020; Employment Rights Act 2025; Finance Act 2026

Status: Amended

Text of statute as originally enacted

Revised text of statute as amended

The Income Tax (Earnings and Pensions) Act 2003 (c. 1) is an act of the Parliament of the United Kingdom.

== Provisions ==
It restated certain legislation relating to income tax "so as to make it clearer and easier to use". The Bill was the work of the Tax Law Rewrite Project team at the Inland Revenue.

Sections relating to the pensions of Members of the House of Commons were amended by the House of Commons Members' Fund Act 2016.

The act allows free or subsidised food provided to employees to be exempt from tax.

The act exempts MPs' overnight expenses.

The act contains the IR35 rules.

== See also ==
- Taxation in the United Kingdom
