= Consolidation of Enactments (Procedure) Act 1949 =

Act of the Parliament of the United Kingdom

Consolidation of Enactments (Procedure) Act 1949 (Note: Section 3(1).)
- Act of Parliament
- Parliament of the United Kingdom
- Long title: An Act to facilitate the preparation of Bills for the purpose of consolidating the enactments relating to any subject.
- Citation: 12, 13 & 14 Geo. 6. c. 33
- Territorial extent: United Kingdom

Dates
- Royal assent: 31 May 1949
- Commencement: 31 May 1949 (Note: The Acts of Parliament (Commencement) Act 1793.)
Other legislation
Amended by	Transfer of Functions (Secretary of State and Lord Advocate) Order 1972; Constitutional Reform Act 2005
Relates to	Marriage Act 1949

Status: Amended

Text of statute as originally enacted

Revised text of statute as amended

Text of the Consolidation of Enactments (Procedure) Act 1949 as in force today (including any amendments) within the United Kingdom, from legislation.gov.uk.

The Consolidation of Enactments (Procedure) Act 1949 (12, 13 & 14 Geo. 6. c. 33) is an act of the Parliament of the United Kingdom that provides a procedure for including "minor corrections and improvements" in consolidation bills.

In 1995, Halsbury's Laws of England said that the procedure authorised by this act was "no longer used in practice".

The Marriage Act 1949 (12, 13 & 14 Geo. 6. c. 76) was the first act to be enacted under the act.
