= Northern Ireland Act =

Stock short title used for UK legislation

Northern Ireland Act (with its variations) is a stock short title used in the United Kingdom for legislation relating to Northern Ireland.

== List ==
- The Northern Ireland Land Act 1925 (15 & 16 Geo. 5. c. 34)
- The Northern Ireland (Miscellaneous Provisions) Act 1928 (18 & 19 Geo. 5. c. 24)
- The Northern Ireland Land Act 1929 (19 & 20 Geo. 5. c. 14)
- The Northern Ireland (Miscellaneous Provisions) Act 1932 (22 & 23 Geo. 5. c. 11)
- The Northern Ireland Land Purchase (Winding Up) Act 1935 (25 & 26 Geo. 5. c. 21)
- The Northern Ireland (Miscellaneous Provisions) Act 1945 (8 & 9 Geo. 6. c. 12)
- The Northern Ireland Act 1947 (10 & 11 Geo. 6. c. 37)
- The Northern Ireland Act 1962 (10 & 11 Eliz. 2. c. 30)
- The Northern Ireland Act 1972 (c. 10)
- The Northern Ireland (Temporary Provisions) Act 1972 (c. 22)
- The Northern Ireland Assembly Act 1973 (c. 17)
- The Northern Ireland Constitution Act 1973 (c. 36)
- The Northern Ireland (Emergency Provisions) Act 1973 (c. 53)
- The Northern Ireland Act 1974 (c. 28)
- The Northern Ireland (Loans) Act 1985 (c. 76)
- The Northern Ireland (Emergency Provisions) Act 1987 (c. 30)
- The Northern Ireland (Emergency Provisions) Act 1991 (c. 24)
- The Northern Ireland (Remission of Sentences) Act 1995 (c. 47)
- The Northern Ireland (Entry to Negotiations, etc) Act 1996 (c. 11)
- The Northern Ireland (Emergency Provisions) Act 1996 (c. 22)
- The Northern Ireland Arms Decommissioning Act 1997 (c. 7)
- The Northern Ireland Act 1998 (c. 47)
- The Northern Ireland (Emergency Provisions) Act 1998 (c. 9)
- The Northern Ireland (Elections) Act 1998 (c. 12)
- The Northern Ireland Arms Decommissioning (Amendment) Act 2002 (c. 6)
- The Northern Ireland Assembly (Elections and Periods of Suspension) Act 2003 (c. 12)
- The Northern Ireland (Monitoring Commission etc.) Act 2003 (c. 25)
- The Northern Ireland Act 2006 (c. 17)
- The Northern Ireland (Miscellaneous Provisions) Act 2006 (c. 33)
- The Northern Ireland (St Andrews Agreement) Act 2006 (c. 53)
- The Northern Ireland (St Andrews Agreement) Act 2007 (c. 4)
- The Northern Ireland Act 2009 (c. 3)
- The Northern Ireland (Miscellaneous Provisions) Act 2014 (c. 13)
- The Northern Ireland (Welfare Reform) Act 2015 (c. 34)
- The Northern Ireland (Stormont Agreement and Implementation Plan) Act 2016 (c. 13)
- The Northern Ireland (Ministerial Appointments and Regional Rates) Act 2017 (c. 24)
- The Northern Ireland Budget Act 2017 (c. 34)
- The Northern Ireland (Regional Rates and Energy) Act 2018 (c. 6)
- The Northern Ireland Assembly Members (Pay) Act 2018 (c. 7)
- The Northern Ireland Budget (Anticipation and Adjustments) Act 2018 (c. 8)
- The Northern Ireland Budget Act 2018 (c. 20)
- The Northern Ireland (Executive Formation and Exercise of Functions) Act 2018 (c. 28)
- The Northern Ireland Budget (Anticipation and Adjustments) Act 2019 (c. 11)
- The Northern Ireland (Regional Rates and Energy) Act 2019 (c. 13)
- The Northern Ireland (Executive Formation etc) Act 2019 (c. 22)
- The Northern Ireland (Ministers, Elections and Petitions of Concern) Act 2022 (c. 2)
- The Northern Ireland (Executive Formation) Act 2024 (c. 2)

== See also ==
- List of short titles
- Scotland Act (disambiguation)
- Government of Wales Act (disambiguation), Wales Act
