= List of acts of the Parliament of the United Kingdom from 2006 =

This is a list of acts of the Parliament of the United Kingdom passed in 2006.

Acts passed since 1963 are cited by calendar year, as opposed to the convention used for earlier acts of citing the regnal year(s) in which the relevant parliamentary session was held. Each act passed in a respective year is given a chapter number (abbreviated "c."), denoted by Arabic numerals in the case of public general acts, lowercase Roman numerals in the case of local acts, or italicised Arabic numerals in the case of personal acts. These run as separate series.

59 acts of Parliament were passed in 2006: 55 public general acts and 4 local acts.

indicates that an act has been transcribed on Wikisource, indicates that an act is available to view at legislation.gov.uk, and indicates the location of the original act in the Parliamentary Archives.

== Public general acts ==
Short title	Citation	Royal assent
Long title
Racial and Religious Hatred Act 2006	2006 c. 1	16 February 2006
An Act to make provision about offences involving stirring up hatred against persons on racial or religious grounds.
European Union (Accessions) Act 2006 (repealed)	2006 c. 2	16 February 2006
An Act to make provision consequential on the treaty concerning the accession of the Republic of Bulgaria and Romania to the European Union, signed at Luxembourg on 25th April 2005; and to make provision in relation to the entitlement of nationals of those states to enter or reside in the United Kingdom as workers. (Repealed by European Union (Withdrawal) Act 2018 (Consequential Modifications and Repeals and Revocations) (EU Exit) Regulations 2019 (SI 2019/628))
Equality Act 2006	2006 c. 3	16 February 2006
An Act to make provision for the establishment of the Commission for Equality and Human Rights; to dissolve the Equal Opportunities Commission, the Commission for Racial Equality and the Disability Rights Commission; to make provision about discrimination on grounds of religion or belief; to enable provision to be made about discrimination on grounds of sexual orientation; to impose duties relating to sex discrimination on persons performing public functions; to amend the Disability Discrimination Act 1995; (Note: Disability Discrimination Act 1995 (c. 50)) and for connected purposes.
Terrorism (Northern Ireland) Act 2006	2006 c. 4	16 February 2006
An Act to provide for Part 7 of the Terrorism Act 2000 (Note: Terrorism Act 2000 (c. 11)) to continue in force for a limited period after 18th February 2006 subject to modifications and to authorise the making of provision in connection with its ceasing to have effect; and for connected purposes.
Transport (Wales) Act 2006	2006 c. 5	16 February 2006
An Act to make provision about transport to, from and within Wales.
Appropriation Act 2006 (repealed)	2006 c. 6	30 March 2006
An Act to authorise the use of resources for the service of the years ending with 31st March 2005 and 31st March 2006 and to apply certain sums out of the Consolidated Fund to the service of the year ending with 31st March 2006; and to appropriate the supply authorised in this Session of Parliament for the service of the year ending with 31st March 2005 and the further supply authorised in this session of Parliament for the service of the year ending with 31st March 2006. (Repealed by Appropriation (No. 2) Act 2008 (c. 8))
Council Tax (New Valuation Lists for England) Act 2006	2006 c. 7	30 March 2006
An Act to make provision about the dates on which new valuation lists for the purposes of council tax must be compiled in relation to billing authorities in England.
Merchant Shipping (Pollution) Act 2006	2006 c. 8	30 March 2006
An Act to enable effect to be given to the Supplementary Fund Protocol 2003 and to future revisions of the international arrangements relating to compensation for oil pollution from ships; to enable effect to be given to Annex VI of the MARPOL Convention; and to amend section 178(1) of the Merchant Shipping Act 1995. (Note: Merchant Shipping Act 1995 (c. 21))
Criminal Defence Service Act 2006	2006 c. 9	30 March 2006
An Act to make provision about representation funded as part of the Criminal Defence Service.
National Insurance Contributions Act 2006	2006 c. 10	30 March 2006
An Act to make provision about national insurance contributions in cases where there is a retrospective change to the law relating to income tax and to enable related provision to be made for the purposes of contributory benefits, statutory payments and other matters; to make provision about the disclosure of information in relation to arrangements for the avoidance of national insurance contributions; and for connected purposes.
Terrorism Act 2006	2006 c. 11	30 March 2006
An Act to make provision for and about offences relating to conduct carried out, or capable of being carried out, for purposes connected with terrorism; to amend enactments relating to terrorism; to amend the Intelligence Services Act 1994 (Note: Intelligence Services Act 1994 (c. 13)) and the Regulation of Investigatory Powers Act 2000; (Note: Regulation of Investigatory Powers Act 2000 (c. 23)) and for connected purposes.
London Olympic Games and Paralympic Games Act 2006	2006 c. 12	30 March 2006
An Act to make provision in connection with the Olympic Games and Paralympic Games that are to take place in London in the year 2012; to amend the Olympic Symbol etc. (Protection) Act 1995; (Note: Olympic Symbol etc. (Protection) Act 1995 (c. 32)) and for connected purposes.
Immigration, Asylum and Nationality Act 2006	2006 c. 13	30 March 2006
An Act to make provision about immigration, asylum and nationality; and for connected purposes.
Consumer Credit Act 2006	2006 c. 14	30 March 2006
An Act to amend the Consumer Credit Act 1974; to extend the ombudsman scheme under the Financial Services and Markets Act 2000 to cover licensees under the Consumer Credit Act 1974; and for connected purposes.
Identity Cards Act 2006 (repealed)	2006 c. 15	30 March 2006
An Act to make provision for a national scheme of registration of individuals and for the issue of cards capable of being used for identifying registered individuals; to make it an offence for a person to be in possession or control of an identity document to which he is not entitled, or of apparatus, articles or materials for making false identity documents; to amend the Consular Fees Act 1980; (Note: Consular Fees Act 1980 (c. 23)) to make provision facilitating the verification of information provided with an application for a passport; and for connected purposes. (Repealed by Identity Documents Act 2010 (c. 40))
Natural Environment and Rural Communities Act 2006	2006 c. 16	30 March 2006
An Act to make provision about bodies concerned with the natural environment and rural communities; to make provision in connection with wildlife, sites of special scientific interest, National Parks and the Broads; to amend the law relating to rights of way; to make provision as to the Inland Waterways Amenity Advisory Council; to provide for flexible administrative arrangements in connection with functions relating to the environment and rural affairs and certain other functions; and for connected purposes.
Northern Ireland Act 2006 (repealed)	2006 c. 17	8 May 2006
An Act to make provision for preparations for the restoration of devolved government in Northern Ireland and for the selection of persons to be Ministers on such restoration; to make provision as to the consequences of selecting or not selecting such persons; and for connected purposes. (Repealed by Northern Ireland (St Andrews Agreement) Act 2006 (c. 53))
Work and Families Act 2006	2006 c. 18	21 June 2006
An Act to make provision about statutory rights to leave and pay in connection with the birth or adoption of children; to amend section 80F of the Employment Rights Act 1996; (Note: Employment Rights Act 1996 (c. 18)) to make provision about workers' entitlement to annual leave; to provide for the increase in the sums specified in section 186(1) and 227(1) of that Act; and for connected purposes.
Climate Change and Sustainable Energy Act 2006	2006 c. 19	21 June 2006
An Act to make provision about the reduction of emissions of greenhouse gases, the alleviation of fuel poverty, the promotion of microgeneration and the use of heat produced from renewable sources, compliance with building regulations relating to emissions of greenhouse gases and the use of fuel and power, the renewables obligation relating to the generation and supply of electricity and the adjustment of transmission charges for electricity; and for connected purposes.
Children and Adoption Act 2006	2006 c. 20	21 June 2006
An Act to make provision as regards contact with children; to make provision as regards family assistance orders; to make provision about risk assessments; to make provision as regards adoptions with a foreign element; and for connected purposes.
Childcare Act 2006	2006 c. 21	11 July 2006
An Act to make provision about the powers and duties of local authorities and other bodies in England in relation to the improvement of the well-being of young children; to make provision about the powers and duties of local authorities in England and Wales in relation to the provision of childcare and the provision of information to parents and other persons; to make provision about the regulation and inspection of childcare provision in England; to amend Part 10A of the Children Act 1989 (Note: Children Act 1989 (c. 41)) in relation to Wales; and for connected purposes.
Electoral Administration Act 2006	2006 c. 22	11 July 2006
An Act to make provision in relation to the registration of electors and the keeping of electoral registration information; standing for election; the administration and conduct of elections and referendums; and the regulation of political parties.
National Lottery Act 2006	2006 c. 23	11 July 2006
An Act to make provision about the National Lottery.
Appropriation (No. 2) Act 2006 (repealed)	2006 c. 24	19 July 2006
An Act to authorise the use of resources for the service of the year ending with 31st March 2007 and to apply certain sums out of the Consolidated Fund to the service of the year ending with 31st March 2007; to appropriate the supply authorised in this Session of Parliament for the service of the year ending with 31st March 2007; and to repeal certain Consolidated Fund and Appropriation Acts. (Repealed by Appropriation (No. 2) Act 2008 (c. 8))
Finance Act 2006	2006 c. 25	19 July 2006
An Act to grant certain duties, to alter other duties, and to amend the law relating to the National Debt and the Public Revenue, and to make further provision in connection with finance.
Commons Act 2006	2006 c. 26	19 July 2006
An Act to make provision about common land and town or village greens; and for connected purposes.
Housing Corporation (Delegation) etc. Act 2006	2006 c. 27	19 July 2006
An Act to make provision about the delegation of functions by the Housing Corporation and Housing for Wales and about the validation of things done or evidenced by, and the authentication of the fixing of, their seals.
Health Act 2006	2006 c. 28	19 July 2006
An Act to make provision for the prohibition of smoking in certain premises, places and vehicles and for amending the minimum age of persons to whom tobacco may be sold; to make provision in relation to the prevention and control of health care associated infections; to make provision in relation to the management and use of controlled drugs; to make provision in relation to the supervision of certain dealings with medicinal products and the running of pharmacy premises, and about orders under the Medicines Act 1968 (Note: Medicines Act 1968 (c. 67)) and orders amending that Act under the Health Act 1999; (Note: Health Act 1999 (c. 8)) to make further provision about the National Health Service in England and Wales and about the recovery of National Health Service costs; to make provision for the establishment and functions of the Appointments Commission; to make further provision about the exercise of social care training functions; and for connected purposes.
Compensation Act 2006	2006 c. 29	25 July 2006
An Act to specify certain factors that may be taken into account by a court determining a claim in negligence or breach of statutory duty; to make provision about damages for mesothelioma; and to make provision for the regulation of claims management services.
Commissioner for Older People (Wales) Act 2006	2006 c. 30	25 July 2006 (Note: The Queen's Printer edition erroneously states that royal assent was given on 25 July 2005, but the Journals of the House of Commons and the Journals of the House of Lords both confirm that it was in fact given on 25 July 2006.)
An Act to establish and make provision about the office of Commissioner for Older People in Wales; to make provision about the functions of the Commissioner for Older People in Wales; and for connected purposes.
International Development (Reporting and Transparency) Act 2006	2006 c. 31	25 July 2006
An Act to require the Secretary of State to report annually on total expenditure on international aid and on the breakdown of such aid, and in particular on progress towards the target for expenditure on official development assistance to constitute 0.7 per cent of gross national income; to require such reports to contain information about expenditure by country, about the proportion of expenditure in low income countries and about the effectiveness of aid expenditure and the transparency of international aid; and for connected purposes.
Government of Wales Act 2006	2006 c. 32	25 July 2006
An Act to make provision about the government of Wales.
Northern Ireland (Miscellaneous Provisions) Act 2006	2006 c. 33	25 July 2006
An Act to make provision about registration of electors and the Chief Electoral Officer for Northern Ireland; to amend the Northern Ireland Act 1998; (Note: Northern Ireland Act 1998 (c. 47)) to make provision about donations for political purposes; to extend the amnesty period for arms decommissioning in Northern Ireland; and to make miscellaneous amendments in the law relating to Northern Ireland.
Civil Aviation Act 2006	2006 c. 34	8 November 2006
An Act to make further provision about civil aviation, including provision about the funding of the Air Travel Trust; and for connected purposes.
Fraud Act 2006	2006 c. 35	8 November 2006
An Act to make provision for, and in connection with, criminal liability for fraud and obtaining services dishonestly.
Wireless Telegraphy Act 2006	2006 c. 36	8 November 2006
An Act to consolidate enactments about wireless telegraphy.
Parliamentary Costs Act 2006	2006 c. 37	8 November 2006
An Act to consolidate the House of Commons Costs Taxation Act 1847, (Note: House of Commons Costs Taxation Act 1847 (10 & 11 Vict. c. 69)) the House of Lords Costs Taxation Act 1849, (Note: House of Lords Costs Taxation Act 1849 (12 & 13 Vict. c. 78)) the Parliamentary Costs Act 1865, (Note: Parliamentary Costs Act 1865 (28 & 29 Vict. c. 27)) the Parliamentary Costs Act 1867, (Note: Parliamentary Costs Act 1867 (30 & 31 Vict. c. 136)) the Parliamentary Costs Act 1871 (Note: Parliamentary Costs Act 1871 (34 & 35 Vict. c. 3)) and the House of Commons Costs Taxation Act 1879, (Note: House of Commons Costs Taxation Act 1879 (42 & 43 Vict. c. 17)) with amendments to give effect to recommendations of the Law Commission and the Scottish Law Commission.
Violent Crime Reduction Act 2006	2006 c. 38	8 November 2006
An Act to make provision for reducing and dealing with the abuse of alcohol; to make provision about real and imitation firearms, about ammunition and about knives and other weapons; to amend the Football Spectators Act 1989 (Note: Football Spectators Act 1989 (c. 37)) and the Football (Disorder) Act 2000; (Note: Football (Disorder) Act 2000 (c. 25)) to amend the Sexual Offences Act 2003 (Note: Sexual Offences Act 2003 (c. 42)) and section 8 of the Crime and Disorder Act 1998; (Note: Crime and Disorder Act 1998 (c. 37)) to amend section 23 of the Children and Young Persons Act 1969; (Note: Children and Young Persons Act 1969 (c. 54)) to amend the Mobile Telephones (Re-programming) Act 2002; (Note: Mobile Telephones (Re-programming) Act 2002 (c. 31)) and for connected purposes.
Emergency Workers (Obstruction) Act 2006	2006 c. 39	8 November 2006
An Act to make it an offence to obstruct or hinder persons who provide emergency services; and for connected purposes.
Education and Inspections Act 2006	2006 c. 40	8 November 2006
An Act to make provision about primary, secondary and further education and about training; to make provision about food or drink provided on school premises or in connection with the provision of education or childcare; to provide for the establishment of an Office for Standards in Education, Children's Services and Skills and the appointment of Her Majesty's Chief Inspector of Education, Children's Services and Skills and make provision about the functions of that Office and that Chief Inspector; to provide for the amendment of references to local education authorities and children's services authorities; to amend section 29 of the Leasehold Reform Act 1967 (Note: Leasehold Reform Act 1967 (c. 88)) in relation to university bodies; and for connected purposes.
National Health Service Act 2006	2006 c. 41	8 November 2006
An Act to consolidate certain enactments relating to the health service.
National Health Service (Wales) Act 2006	2006 c. 42	8 November 2006
An Act to consolidate certain enactments relating to the health service.
National Health Service (Consequential Provisions) Act 2006	2006 c. 43	8 November 2006
An Act to make provision for repeals, revocations, consequential amendments, transitional and transitory modifications and savings in connection with the consolidation of enactments in the National Health Service Act 2006 (Note: National Health Service Act 2006 (c. 41)) and the National Health Service (Wales) Act 2006. (Note: National Health Service (Wales) Act 2006 (c. 42))
NHS Redress Act 2006	2006 c. 44	8 November 2006
An Act to make provision about arrangements for redress in relation to liability in tort in connection with services provided as part of the health service in England or Wales; and for connected purposes.
Animal Welfare Act 2006	2006 c. 45	8 November 2006
An Act to make provision about animal welfare; and for connected purposes.
Companies Act 2006	2006 c. 46	8 November 2006
An Act to reform company law and restate the greater part of the enactments relating to companies; to make other provision relating to companies and other forms of business organisation; to make provision about directors' disqualification, business names, auditors and actuaries; to amend Part 9 of the Enterprise Act 2002; (Note: Enterprise Act 2002 (c. 40)) and for connected purposes.
Safeguarding Vulnerable Groups Act 2006	2006 c. 47	8 November 2006
An Act to make provision in connection with the protection of children and vulnerable adults.
Police and Justice Act 2006	2006 c. 48	8 November 2006
An Act to establish a National Policing Improvement Agency; to make provision about police forces and police authorities and about police pensions; to make provision about police powers and about the powers and duties of community support officers, weights and measures inspectors and others; to make provision about the supply to the police and others of information contained in registers of death; to make further provision for combatting crime and disorder; to make further provision about certain inspectorates; to amend Part 12 of the Criminal Justice Act 2003; (Note: Criminal Justice Act 2003 (c. 44)) to amend the Computer Misuse Act 1990; (Note: Computer Misuse Act 1990 (c. 18)) to make provision about the forfeiture of indecent images of children; to provide for the conferring of functions on the Independent Police Complaints Commission in relation to the exercise of enforcement functions by officials involved with immigration and asylum; to amend the Extradition Act 2003; (Note: Extradition Act 2003 (c. 41)) to make further provision about the use of live links in criminal proceedings; and for connected purposes.
Road Safety Act 2006	2006 c. 49	8 November 2006
An Act to make provision about road traffic, registration plates, vehicle and driver information, hackney carriages and private hire vehicles, and trunk road picnic areas.
Charities Act 2006	2006 c. 50	8 November 2006
An Act to provide for the establishment and functions of the Charity Commission for England and Wales and the Charity Tribunal; to make other amendments of the law about charities, including provision about charitable incorporated organisations; to make further provision about public charitable collections and other fund-raising carried on in connection with charities and other institutions; to make other provision about the funding of such institutions; and for connected purposes.
Legislative and Regulatory Reform Act 2006 or the Abolition of Parliament Act 2006	2006 c. 51	8 November 2006
An Act to enable provision to be made for the purpose of removing or reducing burdens resulting from legislation and promoting regulatory principles; to make provision about the exercise of regulatory functions; to make provision about the interpretation of legislation relating to the European Communities and the European Economic Area; to make provision relating to section 2(2) of the European Communities Act 1972; (Note: European Communities Act 1972 (c. 68)) and for connected purposes.
Armed Forces Act 2006	2006 c. 52	8 November 2006
An Act to make provision with respect to the armed forces; and for connected purposes.
Northern Ireland (St Andrews Agreement) Act 2006	2006 c. 53	22 November 2006
An Act to make provision for preparations for the restoration of devolved government in Northern Ireland in accordance with the St Andrews Agreement; to make provision as to the consequences of compliance, or non-compliance, with the St Andrews Agreement timetable; to amend the Northern Ireland Act 1998; (Note: Northern Ireland Act 1998 (c. 47)) to make provision about district policing partnerships; to amend the Education (Northern Ireland) Orders 1997 (Note: Education (Northern Ireland) Order 1997 (SI 1997/866)) and 2006; (Note: Education (Northern Ireland) Order 2006 (SI 2006/1915)) and for connected purposes.
Consolidated Fund Act 2006 (repealed)	2006 c. 54	19 December 2006
An Act to authorise the use of resources for the service of the years ending with 31st March 2007 and 31st March 2008 and to apply certain sums out of the Consolidated Fund to the service of the years ending with 31st March 2007 and 31st March 2008. (Repealed by Appropriation (No. 2) Act 2008 (c. 8))
Investment Exchanges and Clearing Houses Act 2006	2006 c. 55	19 December 2006
An Act to confer power on the Financial Services Authority to disallow excessive regulatory provision by recognised investment exchanges and clearing houses; and for connected purposes.

== Local acts ==
Short title	Citation	Royal assent
Long title
HBOS Group Reorganisation Act 2006	2006 c. i	21 June 2006
An Act to make new provision for the regulation and management of the Governor and Company of the Bank of Scotland upon its registration as a public company under the Companies Act 1985; to provide for the transfer of the undertakings of Capital Bank plc, Halifax plc and HBOS Treasury Services plc to the Governor and Company of the Bank of Scotland; to provide for the transfer of the assets of the Clerical, Medical and General Life Assurance Society to Clerical Medical Investment Group Limited; and for connected purposes.
Leicester City Council Act 2006	2006 c. ii	11 July 2006
An Act to confer powers on Leicester City Council for the better control of street trading in the City of Leicester.
Liverpool City Council Act 2006	2006 c. iii	11 July 2006
An Act to confer powers on Liverpool City Council for the better control of street trading in the City of Liverpool.
Maidstone Borough Council Act 2006	2006 c. iv	11 July 2006
An Act to confer powers on Maidstone Borough Council for the better control of street trading in the borough of Maidstone.

== See also ==
- List of acts of the Parliament of the United Kingdom
