= List of acts of the Parliament of the United Kingdom from 2003 =

This is a list of acts of the Parliament of the United Kingdom passed in 2003.

Acts passed since 1963 are cited by calendar year, as opposed to the convention used for earlier acts of citing the regnal year(s) in which the relevant parliamentary session was held. Each act passed in a respective year is given a chapter number (abbreviated "c."), denoted by Arabic numerals in the case of public general acts, lowercase Roman numerals in the case of local acts, or italicised Arabic numerals in the case of personal acts. These run as separate series.

50 acts of Parliament were passed in 2003: 45 public general acts and 5 local acts.

indicates that an act has been transcribed on Wikisource, indicates that an act is available to view at legislation.gov.uk, and indicates the location of the original act in the Parliamentary Archives.

== Public general acts ==
Short title	Citation	Royal assent
Long title
Income Tax (Earnings and Pensions) Act 2003	2003 c. 1	6 March 2003
An Act to restate, with minor changes, certain enactments relating to income tax on employment income, pension income and social security income; and for connected purposes.
Consolidated Fund Act 2003 (repealed)	2003 c. 2	20 March 2003
An Act to authorise the use of resources for the service of the years ending on 31st March 2002 and 2003 and to apply certain sums out of the Consolidated Fund to the service of the years ending on 31st March 2002 and 2003. (Repealed by Appropriation (No. 3) Act 2005 (c. 21))
Northern Ireland Assembly Elections Act 2003	2003 c. 3	20 March 2003
An Act to make provision about the date of the poll for the election of the next Northern Ireland Assembly, and for disregarding certain days for the purposes of the period after a poll within which an Assembly must meet; and for connected purposes.
Health (Wales) Act 2003	2003 c. 4	8 April 2003
An Act to make provision about Community Health Councils in Wales; to establish and make provision about the Wales Centre for Health; and to make provision for the establishment of, and otherwise about, Health Professions Wales.
Community Care (Delayed Discharges etc.) Act 2003 (repealed)	2003 c. 5	8 April 2003
An Act to make provision requiring social services authorities to make payments in cases where the discharge of patients is delayed for reasons relating to the provision of community care services or services for carers; and to enable the Secretary of State and the National Assembly for Wales to require certain community care services and services for carers provided by social services authorities to be free of charge to persons receiving those services. (Repealed by Health and Care Act 2022 (c. 31))
Police (Northern Ireland) Act 2003	2003 c. 6	8 April 2003
An Act to make provision about policing in Northern Ireland and the exercise of police powers in Northern Ireland by persons who are not police officers; and to amend the Police and Criminal Evidence (Northern Ireland) Order 1989. (Note: Police and Criminal Evidence (Northern Ireland) Order 1989 (SI 1989/1341))
European Parliament (Representation) Act 2003 (repealed)	2003 c. 7	8 May 2003
An Act to make provision enabling alterations to be made to the total number of Members of the European Parliament to be elected for the United Kingdom and to their distribution between the electoral regions; to make provision for and in connection with the establishment of an electoral region including Gibraltar for the purposes of European Parliamentary elections; and for connected purposes. (Repealed by European Union (Withdrawal) Act 2018 (c. 16))
National Minimum Wage (Enforcement Notices) Act 2003 (repealed)	2003 c. 8	8 May 2003
An Act to make provision enabling an enforcement notice under section 19 of the National Minimum Wage Act 1998 (Note: National Minimum Wage Act 1998 (c. 39)) to impose a requirement under subsection (2) of that section in relation to a person, whether or not a requirement under subsection (1) of that section is, or may be, imposed in relation to that or any other person; and to limit the pay reference periods in respect of which a requirement under subsection (2) of that section may be imposed. (Repealed by Employment Act 2008 (c. 24))
Electricity (Miscellaneous Provisions) Act 2003	2003 c. 9	8 May 2003
An Act to make provision in connection with the provision of financial assistance to, or the acquisition of any securities of or any part of the undertaking or assets of, British Energy p.l.c. or any of its subsidiaries; to provide for the repeal of Part 2 of the Electricity Act 1989; (Note: Electricity Act 1989 (c. 29)) to amend Schedule 12 to that Act and to make provision for undertakings to make grants under that Schedule to be disregarded for tax purposes.
Regional Assemblies (Preparations) Act 2003 (repealed)	2003 c. 10	8 May 2003
An Act to make provision for the holding of referendums about the establishment of elected assemblies for the regions of England (except London); for reviewing the structure of local government in regions where the holding of a referendum is under consideration; for the holding of referendums about options for implementing the recommendations of such reviews; for implementing the recommendations of such reviews; for the Electoral Commission to give advice in connection with the establishment of assemblies; for payment of grant in connection with the activities of regional chambers; and for incurring expenditure in preparation for assemblies and in connection with the transfer of functions to them. (Repealed by Local Democracy, Economic Development and Construction Act 2009 (c. 20))
Industrial Development (Financial Assistance) Act 2003 (repealed)	2003 c. 11	8 May 2003
An Act to amend section 8(5) of the Industrial Development Act 1982. (Note: Industrial Development Act 1982 (c. 52)) (Repealed by Industry and Exports (Financial Support) Act 2009 (c. 5))
Northern Ireland Assembly (Elections and Periods of Suspension) Act 2003	2003 c. 12	15 May 2003
An Act to make further provision about the election of the next Northern Ireland Assembly; to make further provision about periods when section 1 of the Northern Ireland Act 2000 (Note: Northern Ireland Act 2000 (c. 1)) is in force; and for connected purposes.
Appropriation Act 2003 (repealed)	2003 c. 13	10 July 2003
An Act to authorise the use of resources for the service of the year ending with 31st March 2004 and to apply certain sums out of the Consolidated Fund to the service of the year ending with 31st March 2004; to appropriate the further supply authorised in this Session of Parliament; and to repeal certain Consolidated Fund and Appropriation Acts. (Repealed by Appropriation (No. 3) Act 2005 (c. 21))
Finance Act 2003	2003 c. 14	10 July 2003
An Act to grant certain duties, to alter other duties, and to amend the law relating to the National Debt and the Public Revenue, and to make further provision in connection with finance.
Co-operatives and Community Benefit Societies Act 2003 (repealed)	2003 c. 15	10 July 2003
An Act to enable the law relating to co-operatives and community benefit societies registered under the Industrial and Provident Societies Act 1965 (Note: Industrial and Provident Societies Act 1965 (c. 12)) to be amended so as to bring it into conformity with certain aspects of the law relating to companies; to permit a registered society whose business is conducted for the benefit of the community to provide that its assets are dedicated permanently for that purpose; and for connected purposes. (Repealed by Co-operative and Community Benefit Societies Act 2014 (c. 14))
Marine Safety Act 2003	2003 c. 16	10 July 2003
An Act to make provision about the giving of directions in respect of ships for purposes relating to safety or pollution and about the taking of action to enforce, in connection with, or in lieu of, directions; to make provision about fire-fighting in connection with marine incidents; and for connected purposes.
Licensing Act 2003	2003 c. 17	10 July 2003
An Act to make provision about the regulation of the sale and supply of alcohol, the provision of entertainment and the provision of late night refreshment, about offences relating to alcohol and for connected purposes.
Sunday Working (Scotland) Act 2003	2003 c. 18	10 July 2003
An Act to make provision as to the rights of shop workers and betting workers under the law of Scotland in relation to Sunday working; and for connected purposes.
Aviation (Offences) Act 2003	2003 c. 19	10 July 2003
An Act to make provision about the enforcement of certain offences connected with aviation.
Railways and Transport Safety Act 2003	2003 c. 20	10 July 2003
An Act to make provision about railways, including tramways; to make provision about transport safety; and for connected purposes.
Communications Act 2003	2003 c. 21	17 July 2003
An Act to confer functions on the Office of Communications; to make provision about the regulation of the provision of electronic communications networks and services and of the use of the electro-magnetic spectrum; to make provision about the regulation of broadcasting and of the provision of television and radio services; to make provision about mergers involving newspaper and other media enterprises and, in that connection, to amend the Enterprise Act 2002; (Note: Enterprise Act 2002 (c. 40)) and for connected purposes.
Fireworks Act 2003	2003 c. 22	18 September 2003
An Act to make provision about fireworks and other explosives.
National Lottery (Funding of Endowments) Act 2003	2003 c. 23	18 September 2003
An Act to make provision about the funding of endowments from distributions of money out of the National Lottery Distribution Fund; and for connected purposes.
Human Fertilisation and Embryology (Deceased Fathers) Act 2003	2003 c. 24	18 September 2003
An Act to make provision about the circumstances in which, and the extent to which, a man is to be treated in law as the father of a child where the child has resulted from certain fertility treatment undertaken after the man's death; and for connected purposes.
Northern Ireland (Monitoring Commission etc.) Act 2003	2003 c. 25	18 September 2003
An Act to make provision in connection with the establishment under international law of an independent commission with monitoring functions in relation to Northern Ireland; to make further provision about exclusion from Ministerial office in Northern Ireland; to make provision about reduction of remuneration of members of the Northern Ireland Assembly; to make provision about reduction of financial assistance under the Financial Assistance for Political Parties Act (Northern Ireland) 2000; (Note: Financial Assistance for Political Parties Act (Northern Ireland) 2000 (c. 1 (NI))) to make provision about censure resolutions of the Northern Ireland Assembly; and for connected purposes.
Local Government Act 2003	2003 c. 26	18 September 2003
An Act to make provision about finance, and other provision, in connection with local and certain other authorities; to provide for changing the dates of local elections in 2004; to amend the Audit Commission Act 1998; (Note: Audit Commission Act 1998 (c. 18)) and for connected purposes.
Dealing in Cultural Objects (Offences) Act 2003	2003 c. 27	30 October 2003
An Act to provide for an offence of acquiring, disposing of, importing or exporting tainted cultural objects, or agreeing or arranging to do so; and for connected purposes.
Legal Deposit Libraries Act 2003	2003 c. 28	30 October 2003
An Act to make provision in place of section 15 of the Copyright Act 1911 (Note: Copyright Act 1911 (1 & 2 Geo. 5. c. 46)) relating to the deposit of printed and similar publications, including on and off line publications; to make provision about the use and preservation of material deposited; and for connected purposes.
Household Waste Recycling Act 2003	2003 c. 29	30 October 2003
An Act to make further provision regarding the collection, composting and recycling of household waste; and for connected purposes.
Sustainable Energy Act 2003	2003 c. 30	30 October 2003
An Act to make provision about the development and promotion of a sustainable energy policy; to amend the Utilities Act 2000; (Note: Utilities Act 2000 (c. 27)) and for connected purposes.
Female Genital Mutilation Act 2003	2003 c. 31	30 October 2003
An Act to restate and amend the law relating to female genital mutilation; and for connected purposes.
Crime (International Co-operation) Act 2003	2003 c. 32	30 October 2003
An Act to make provision for furthering co-operation with other countries in respect of criminal proceedings and investigations; to extend jurisdiction to deal with terrorist acts or threats outside the United Kingdom; to amend section 5 of the Forgery and Counterfeiting Act 1981 (Note: Forgery and Counterfeiting Act 1981 (c. 45)) and make corresponding provision in relation to Scotland; and for connected purposes.
Waste and Emissions Trading Act 2003	2003 c. 33	13 November 2003
An Act to make provision about waste and about penalties for non-compliance with schemes for the trading of emissions quotas.
Arms Control and Disarmament (Inspections) Act 2003	2003 c. 34	13 November 2003
An Act to make further provision relating to the Treaty on Conventional Armed Forces in Europe signed in Paris on 19th November 1990.
European Union (Accessions) Act 2003 (repealed)	2003 c. 35	13 November 2003
An Act to make provision consequential on the treaty concerning the accession of the Czech Republic, the Republic of Estonia, the Republic of Cyprus, the Republic of Latvia, the Republic of Lithuania, the Republic of Hungary, the Republic of Malta, the Republic of Poland, the Republic of Slovenia and the Slovak Republic to the European Union, signed at Athens on 16th April 2003; and to make provision in relation to the entitlement of nationals of certain acceding States to enter or reside in the United Kingdom as workers. (Repealed by European Union (Withdrawal) Act 2018 (Consequential Modifications and Repeals and Revocations) (EU Exit) Regulations 2019 (SI 2019/628))
Fire Services Act 2003	2003 c. 36	13 November 2003
An Act to confer power to set or modify the conditions of service of members of fire brigades and to give directions to fire authorities.
Water Act 2003	2003 c. 37	20 November 2003
An Act to amend the Water Resources Act 1991 (Note: Water Resources Act 1991 (c. 57)) and the Water Industry Act 1991; (Note: Water Industry Act 1991 (c. 56)) to make provision with respect to compensation under section 61 of the Water Resources Act 1991; to provide for the establishment and functions of the Water Services Regulation Authority and the Consumer Council for Water, and for the abolition of the office of Director General of Water Services; to make provision in connection with land drainage and flood defence; to amend the Reservoirs Act 1975; (Note: Reservoirs Act 1975 (c. 23)) to make provision about contaminated land so far as it relates to the pollution of controlled waters; to confer on the Coal Authority functions in relation to the discharge of water from coal mines; to extend the functions of the Environment Agency in relation to the Rivers Esk, Sark and Tweed and their tributaries so far as they are in England; to repeal section 1 of the Metropolis Water Act 1852; (Note: Metropolis Water Act 1852 (15 & 16 Vict. c. 84)) and for connected purposes.
Anti-social Behaviour Act 2003	2003 c. 38	20 November 2003
An Act to make provision in connection with anti-social behaviour.
Courts Act 2003	2003 c. 39	20 November 2003
An Act to make provision about the courts and their procedure and practice; about judges and magistrates; about fines and the enforcement processes of the courts; about periodical payments of damages; and for connected purposes.
Ragwort Control Act 2003	2003 c. 40	20 November 2003
An Act to amend the Weeds Act 1959 (Note: Weeds Act 1959 (7 & 8 Eliz. 2. c. 54)) in relation to ragwort; and for connected purposes.
Extradition Act 2003	2003 c. 41	20 November 2003
An Act to make provision about extradition.
Sexual Offences Act 2003	2003 c. 42	20 November 2003
An Act to make new provision about sexual offences, their prevention and the protection of children from harm from other sexual acts, and for connected purposes.
Health and Social Care (Community Health and Standards) Act 2003	2003 c. 43	20 November 2003
An Act to amend the law about the National Health Service; to make provision about quality and standards in the provision of health and social care, including provision establishing the Commission for Healthcare Audit and Inspection and the Commission for Social Care Inspection; to amend the law about the recovery of NHS costs from persons making compensation payments; to provide for the replacement of the Welfare Food Schemes; to make provision about appointments to health and social care bodies; and for connected purposes.
Criminal Justice Act 2003	2003 c. 44	20 November 2003
An Act to make provision about criminal justice (including the powers and duties of the police) and about dealing with offenders; to amend the law relating to jury service; to amend Chapter 1 of Part 1 of the Crime and Disorder Act 1998 (Note: Crime and Disorder Act 1998 (c. 37)) and Part 5 of the Police Act 1997; (Note: Police Act 1997 (c. 50)) to make provision about civil proceedings brought by offenders; and for connected purposes.
Consolidated Fund (No. 2) Act 2003 (repealed)	2003 c. 45	17 December 2003
An Act to authorise the use of resources for the service of the years ending with 31st March 2004 and 2005 and to apply certain sums out of the Consolidated Fund to the service of the years ending with 31st March 2004 and 2005. (Repealed by Appropriation (No. 3) Act 2005 (c. 21))

== Local acts ==
Short title	Citation	Royal assent
Long title
London Development Agency Act 2003	2003 c. i	6 March 2003
An Act to confer powers upon the London Development Agency.
Nottingham City Council Act 2003	2003 c. ii	10 July 2003
An Act to confer powers on Nottingham City Council for the registration of second-hand goods dealers in the city of Nottingham; for the control of occasional sales and squat trading in the city; and for other purposes.
London Local Authorities and Transport for London Act 2003	2003 c. iii	30 October 2003
An Act to confer further powers upon local authorities in London and upon Transport for London; and for related purposes.
Hereford Markets Act 2003	2003 c. iv	30 October 2003
An Act to make new provision for markets in the district of Herefordshire.
Transas Group Act 2003	2003 c. v	20 November 2003
An Act to enable the transfer to a company registered in the Republic of Ireland of the incorporations and undertakings of Transas Dataco Limited, Transas Eurasia Limited, Transas Marine Limited, Transas Technology Limited and Transas Telematics Limited; for the cesser of application to those companies of provisions of the Companies Act 1985; and for incidental purposes.

== See also ==
- List of acts of the Parliament of the United Kingdom
