= Northern Ireland Act 1974 =

Act of the Parliament of the United Kingdom

Northern Ireland Act 1974 (Note: Section 3.)
- Act of Parliament
- Parliament of the United Kingdom
- Long title: An act to provide for the dissolution of the existing Northern Ireland Assembly and its prorogation until dissolution; to make temporary provision for the government of Northern Ireland; to provide for the election and holding of a Constitutional Convention in Northern Ireland; and for purposes connected with those matters.
- Citation: 1974 c. 28
- Territorial extent: United Kingdom

Dates
- Royal assent: 17 July 1974
- Commencement: 17 July 1974 (Note: The Acts of Parliament (Commencement) Act 1793.)
- Repealed: 2 December 1999 (Note: The Northern Ireland Act 1998 (Commencement No. 5) Order 1999 (SI 1999/3209).)
Other legislation
Repealed by	Northern Ireland Act 1998

Status: Repealed

Text of statute as originally enacted

Revised text of statute as amended

The Northern Ireland Act 1974 (c. 28) was an act of the Parliament of the United Kingdom that made provision for the government of Northern Ireland following the collapse of the Sunningdale Agreement. The act authorised the dissolution of the Northern Ireland Assembly, and transferred its legislative powers to the Queen in Council.

The act was intended as a temporary measure, staying in force for just one year. However, it made provision for the Secretary of State for Northern Ireland to make annual orders extending the duration of the act. As such, the act remained in force until the institutions created following the 1998 Belfast Agreement were up and running in late 1999.

The act also established a Constitutional Convention, which ultimately failed to achieve cross-community consensus on new constitutional arrangements, and was permanently dissolved in 1976.

== Provisions ==
Section 1 of the act allowed the Queen to dissolve, by Order in Council, the Assembly elected under the Northern Ireland Assembly Act 1973, which stayed prorogued until it was dissolved. Section 1 also provided for an interim period of one year from the passing of the act, during which schedule 1 had effect for the exercise of legislative, executive and other functions in relation to Northern Ireland. The Secretary of State could by order, approved in draft by both Houses of Parliament, extend the interim period by up to one year at a time, or end it earlier.

Schedule 1 to the act provided that, during the interim period, no Measure could be passed by the Assembly and the Queen could instead make laws for Northern Ireland by Order in Council, which required the approval of both Houses of Parliament, in draft or, in urgent cases, within forty days of being made. It also provided that the functions of the heads of Northern Ireland departments were to be discharged by the departments, and any other functions of office-holders appointed under the Northern Ireland Constitution Act 1973 by the Secretary of State, with departments subject to his direction and control. It dispensed with requirements for the Assembly's approval of subordinate instruments, provided for the reports of the Parliamentary Commissioner and the Commissioner for Complaints, and for certain accounts, to be laid before Parliament instead of the Assembly.

Section 2 of the act provided for the election and holding of a Convention to consider what provision for the government of Northern Ireland was likely to command the most widespread acceptance in the community there. The Convention was to report to the Secretary of State, who was to lay its reports before Parliament, and the Secretary of State could order a poll on any matter arising from a report. Schedule 2 to the act provided that the Convention consisted of a chairman appointed by the Queen and seventy-eight members elected by the single transferable vote in the Assembly constituencies. The Convention was to be dissolved when its final report was laid before Parliament or six months after it first met, whichever was earlier, although the Secretary of State could postpone dissolution by up to three months at a time and could reconvene it within six months after it was dissolved.

== Subsequent developments ==
The whole act was repealed by section 100(2) of, and schedule 15 to, the Northern Ireland Act 1998, which came into force on 2 December 1999.
