= Industrial Development (Financial Assistance) Act 2003 =

Act of the Parliament of the United Kingdom

Industrial Development (Financial Assistance) Act 2003 (Note: Section 2.)
- Act of Parliament
- Parliament of the United Kingdom
- Long title: An Act to amend section 8(5) of the Industrial Development Act 1982.
- Citation: 2003 c. 11
- Territorial extent: United Kingdom

Dates
- Royal assent: 8 May 2003
- Commencement: 8 May 2003 (Note: Section 4(b) of the Interpretation Act 1978.)
- Repealed: 21 May 2009
Other legislation
Repealed by	Industry and Exports (Financial Support) Act 2009

Status: Repealed

Text of statute as originally enacted

Revised text of statute as amended

The Industrial Development (Financial Assistance) Act 2003 (c. 11) was an act of the Parliament of the United Kingdom.

== Background ==
Previously, the assistance funds of the Department of Trade and Industry amounted to £2,700,000,000.

== Provisions ==
The act allowed for an increase of £3,400,000,000 in the assistance funds of the Department of Trade and Industry.

== Subsequent developments ==
The whole act was repealed, with effect from 21 May 2009, by section 1(2) of the Industry and Exports (Financial Support) Act 2009.

== Bibliography ==
- Halsbury's Statutes
