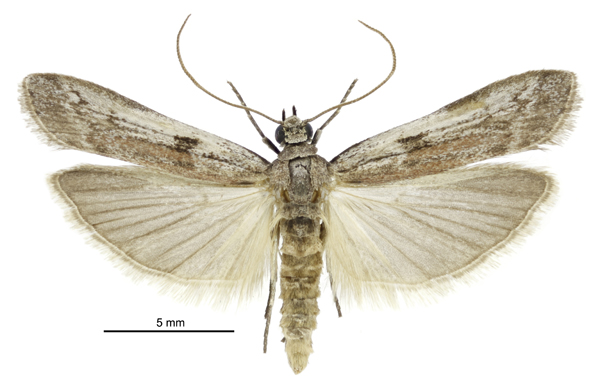

Scientific classification
- Kingdom: Animalia
- Phylum: Arthropoda
- Clade: Pancrustacea
- Class: Insecta
- Order: Lepidoptera
- Family: Pyralidae
- Genus: Patagoniodes
- Species: P. farinaria

Binomial name
- Patagoniodes farinaria (Turner, 1904)

Synonyms
- Homoeosoma farinaria Turner, 1904

= Patagoniodes farinaria =

Species of moth

Patagoniodes farinaria, the blue stem borer, is a moth of the family Pyralidae. It is found in New Zealand and Australia.

It is a shoot borer that feeds on Senecio jacobaea, Senecio species and closely related plants.

Adults are attracted to light and have been collected via a mercury vapour light trap.
