= Household Waste Recycling Act 2003 =

- Act of Parliament
- Parliament of the United Kingdom
- Long title: An Act to make further provision regarding the collection, composting and recycling of household waste; and for connected purposes.
- Citation: 2003 c. 29
- Territorial extent: England and Wales

Dates
- Royal assent: 30 October 2003
- Commencement: 30 December 2003

Other legislation
- Amended by: Environment (Wales) Act 2016

Status: Amended

Text of statute as originally enacted

Text of the Household Waste Recycling Act 2003 as in force today (including any amendments) within the United Kingdom, from legislation.gov.uk.

The Household Waste Recycling Act 2003 (c. 29) is an act of the Parliament of the United Kingdom.

== Background ==
The bill was drafted by Friends of the Earth.

== Provisions ==
The act required local authorities to collect 2 types of materials from households, but this included compost.

== Further developments ==
It has been suggested that this act should be amended to increase the number of recyclable items that collection authorities must collect from households to at least seven.

== Section 5 – Short title, commencement and extent ==
Section 5(2) provides that the act came into force at the end of the period of two months that began on the date on which it was passed. The word "months" means calendar months. The day (that is to say, 30 October 2003) on which the act was passed (that is to say, received royal assent) is included in the period of two months. This means that the act came into force on 30 December 2003.
