= Climate Change and Sustainable Energy Act 2006 =

Act of the Parliament of the United Kingdom

Climate Change and Sustainable Energy Act 2006 (Note: Section 29(1).)
- Act of Parliament
- Parliament of the United Kingdom
- Long title: An Act to make provision about the reduction of emissions of greenhouse gases, the alleviation of fuel poverty, the promotion of microgeneration and the use of heat produced from renewable sources, compliance with building regulations relating to emissions of greenhouse gases and the use of fuel and power, the renewables obligation relating to the generation and supply of electricity and the adjustment of transmission charges for electricity; and for connected purposes.
- Citation: 2006 c. 19
- Introduced by: Mark Lazarowicz (Commons); Lord Whitty (Lords)
- Territorial extent: United Kingdom (Note: Section 29(2) and (3).)

Dates
- Royal assent: 21 June 2006
- Commencement: Various (Note: Section 28. The Climate Change and Sustainable Energy Act 2006 (Commencement) Order 2007 (SI 2007/538).)
Other legislation
Amends	Building Act 1984; Gas Act 1986; Electricity Act 1989; Utilities Act 2000; Sustainable Energy Act 2003; Energy Act 2004
Amended by	Climate Change Act 2008; Energy Act 2008; Climate Change and Sustainable Energy Act 2006 (Sources of Energy and Technologies) Order 2008; Deregulation Act 2015

Status: Partially repealed

History of passage through Parliament

Text of statute as originally enacted

Text of the Climate Change and Sustainable Energy Act 2006 as in force today (including any amendments) within the United Kingdom, from legislation.gov.uk.

The Climate Change and Sustainable Energy Act 2006 (c. 19) is an act of the Parliament of the United Kingdom which aims to boost the number of heat and electricity microgeneration installations in the United Kingdom, so helping to cut carbon emissions and reduce fuel poverty.

The act was piloted through the House of Commons as a private member's bill by Mark Lazarowicz, MP.

The Rt Hon Eric Forth MP, a well known opponent of Private Members' Bills who often filibustered them in Parliament, died during the passage of this bill through Parliament, after having prolonged the debate during Third Reading and Report for a number of days.

== Microgeneration in the United Kingdom ==
Microgeneration technologies are seen as having considerable potential by the Government. Microgeneration involves the local production of electricity by homes and businesses from low-energy sources including small scale wind turbines, ground source heat pumps and solar electricity installations.

The Government's own microgeneration strategy was launched in March 2006 was seen as a disappointment by many commentators. In contrast, the Climate Change and Sustainable Energy Act has been viewed as a positive step.

== The act ==
The principal measures in the act are to:

- require the Secretary of State (DEFRA) to report annually on greenhouse gas emissions during the year plus steps taken to cut them;
- require local authorities to take into account the content of a new 'energy measures report' that the Secretary of State will be required to publish within one year from the signing of the act;
- require the Secretary of State to set national microgeneration targets no later than 31 March 2009;
- require the Secretary of State to expand the annual reports on progress towards sustainable energy aims (under the Sustainable Energy Act 2003), to include:
  - progress in meeting the microgeneration targets;
  - progress in meeting the target (under the Housing Act 2004) for the energy efficiency of residential accommodation in England;
  - progress in meeting the target (under the Housing Act 2004) for the emissions of carbon dioxide in England;
  - progress in meeting the target (under the Housing Act 2004) for the number of households in which one or more persons are living in fuel poverty;
  - things done to promote community energy projects;
  - things done to promote the use of heat from renewable sources.
- give the Secretary of State the power to impose a duty on energy companies to buy energy from microgeneration schemes, if the industry fails to create a voluntary scheme within one year.
- introduce a statutory review that, it is hoped, may change permitted development orders to allow certain domestic microgeneration without the need for planning permission. A consultation period on the proposed changes ends on 27 June 2007.
- make changes to the Building Regulations to:
  - include microgeneration within their scope;
  - increasing to two years the time limit for prosecuting contraventions of the Building Regulations relating to energy use, energy conservation or carbon emissions;
  - require the Secretary of State to report on compliance with these aspects of the Building Regulations and steps proposed to increase compliance.
- change the energy efficiency provisions of the Gas Act 1986 and the Electricity Act 1989 to carbon emission based targets;
- require the Secretary of State to report on the contribution that can be made by dynamic demand technology to cutting greenhouse gas emissions;
- require the Secretary of State to promote community energy projects;
- permit parish councils and community councils to incur expenditure (under the Local Government Act 1972) to encourage or promote microgeneration, biomass production, biomass fuels, and energy efficiency measures;
- give a duty to the Secretary of State to promote the use of heat from renewable sources;
- modify the Electricity Act 1989 to enable Renewables Obligation Certificates to be issued to a wider range of people and organisations;
- modify the Energy Act 2004 with the aim of capping charges for the transmission of renewable electricity produced in the Scottish islands, so reducing production costs and encouraging wind power and wave power.

== Microgeneration technologies ==
For the purposes of the act, microgeneration technologies include:

- biomass
- biofuels
- fuel cells
- photovoltaics
- water (including wave power and tidal power)
- wind power
- solar power
- geothermal sources
- combined heat and power systems

== See also ==
- Climate Change Act 2008
- Climate change in the United Kingdom
- Energy policy of the United Kingdom
- Energy efficiency in British housing
- Sustainable energy
- United Kingdom Climate Change Programme
