= Council Tax (New Valuation Lists for England) Act 2006 =

Act of the Parliament of the United Kingdom

Council Tax (New Valuation Lists for England) Act 2006 (Note: Section 2(1).)
- Act of Parliament
- Parliament of the United Kingdom
- Long title: An Act to make provision about the dates on which new valuation lists for the purposes of council tax must be compiled in relation to billing authorities in England.
- Citation: 2006 c. 7
- Territorial extent: United Kingdom (Note: Section 2(2).)

Dates
- Royal assent: 30 March 2006
- Commencement: 30 March 2006 (Note: Section 4(b) of the Interpretation Act 1978.)
Other legislation
Amends	Local Government Finance Act 1992; Local Government Act 2003

Status: Current legislation

History of passage through Parliament

Text of statute as originally enacted

Text of the Council Tax (New Valuation Lists for England) Act 2006 as in force today (including any amendments) within the United Kingdom, from legislation.gov.uk.

The Council Tax (New Valuation Lists for England) Act 2006 (c. 7) is an act of the Parliament of the United Kingdom.

== Background ==
In 2004, council tax bands were revalued in Wales, and one third of households' bands were increased and 8% of households' bands decreased.

In 2005, the Government extended the remit of the Lyons inquiry to include local government finance.

== Provisions ==
One of its purposes was to postpone the compilation, in relation to billing authorities in England, of new valuation lists for the purposes of council tax until after the Lyons Inquiry had produced its final report, in order to allow that report to be taken into consideration when compiling those lists.

=== Section 1 – Dates on which new valuation lists must be compiled for England ===
This act amended the Local Government Finance Act 1992 and the Local Government Act 2003.

== Bibliography ==
- "Council Tax (New Valuation Lists for England) Act 2006". Current Law Statutes Annotated 2006. Sweet & Maxwell. London. W Green. Edinburgh. 2006. Volume 1. Chapter 7. pp 7-1 to 7-3.
- Halsbury's Statutes
