= Investment Exchanges and Clearing Houses Act 2006 =

Act of the Parliament of the United Kingdom

Investment Exchanges and Clearing Houses Act 2006 (Note: Section 5(1).)
- Act of Parliament
- Parliament of the United Kingdom
- Long title: An Act to confer power on the Financial Services Authority to disallow excessive regulatory provision by recognised investment exchanges and clearing houses; and for connected purposes.
- Citation: 2006 c. 55
- Introduced by: Gordon Brown, Chancellor of the Exchequer (Commons); Lord McKenzie of Luton, Lord-in-waiting (Lords)
- Territorial extent: United Kingdom

Dates
- Royal assent: 19 December 2006
- Commencement: 20 December 2006 (Note: Section 5(2).)
Other legislation
Amends	Financial Services and Markets Act 2000
Amended by	Treaty of Lisbon (Changes in Terminology) Order 2011

Status: Amended

History of passage through Parliament

Text of statute as originally enacted

Text of the Investment Exchanges and Clearing Houses Act 2006 as in force today (including any amendments) within the United Kingdom, from legislation.gov.uk.

The Investment Exchanges and Clearing Houses Act 2006 (c. 55) is an act of the Parliament of the United Kingdom. It was intended to meet concerns that recognised investment exchanges and clearing houses might introduce excessive regulation.

== Background ==
The act was passed due to concerns a NASDAQ takeover of the London Stock Exchange would lead to stronger regulations being imposed on the London Stock Exchange.

== Provisions ==
The act gave the Financial Services Authority (FSA) authority over regulations introduced by exchanges and clearing houses.

The goal of the legislation was to maintain the light-touch regulatory environment within the London Stock Exchange.

== Subsequent developments ==
Section 3 ceased to have effect on 19 December 2007, twelve months after the passing of the act, under section 3(8).

This act is amended by articles 3 and 6 of the Treaty of Lisbon (Changes in Terminology) Order 2011 (SI 2011/1043).

== Bibliography ==
- Halsbury's Statutes
