= Child Trust Funds Act 2004 =

Act of the Parliament of the United Kingdom

Child Trust Funds Act 2004 (Note: Section 31.)
- Act of Parliament
- Parliament of the United Kingdom
- Long title: An Act to make provision about child trust funds and for connected purposes.
- Citation: 2004 c. 6
- Territorial extent: England and Wales; Scotland; Northern Ireland; (Note: Section 30.)

Dates
- Royal assent: 13 May 2004
- Commencement: 13 May 2004 (sections 25–31); Various (rest of act); (Note: Section 27.)
Other legislation
Amends	Finance Act 1989; Northern Ireland Act 1998
Amended by	Immigration (European Economic Area) (Amendment) Regulations 2009; Finance Act 2009, Section 96 and Schedule 48 (Appointed Day, Savings and Consequential Amendments) Order 2009; Transfer of Tribunal Functions and Revenue and Customs Appeals Order 2009; Savings Accounts and Health in Pregnancy Grant Act 2010; Treaty of Lisbon (Changes in Terminology) Order 2011; Deregulation Act 2015

Status: Amended

Text of statute as originally enacted

Revised text of statute as amended

The Child Trust Funds Act 2004 (c. 6) is an act of the Parliament of the United Kingdom.

The goal of the legislation was to create a culture of saving among younger people.

== Provisions ==
The act gave all newborns trusts with at least £250 with £500 being given to children in less wealthy families.

Additionally, the act provided for children to receive a cash sum from the government.

The scheme set up by the act was sometimes known as the "baby bond scheme".

== Implementation ==
When the scheme became operational, there were 75 possible options for which bank to choose for the account.

== The Child Trust Funds Regulations 2004 ==
The Child Trust Funds Regulations 2004 (SI 2004/1450) were made under this Act.

Those regulations are amended by the following regulations, also made under this Act:

- The Child Trust Funds (Amendment) Regulations 2004 (SI 2004/2676)
- The Child Trust Funds (Amendment No. 2) Regulations 2004 (SI 2004/3382)
- The Child Trust Funds (Amendment) Regulations 2005 (SI 2005/383)
- The Child Trust Funds (Amendment No. 2) Regulations 2005 (SI 2005/909)
- The Child Trust Funds (Amendment No. 3) Regulations 2005 (SI 2005/3349)
- The Child Trust Funds (Amendment) Regulations 2006 (SI 2006/199)
- The Child Trust Funds (Amendment No. 2) Regulations 2006 (SI 2006/2684)
- The Child Trust Funds (Amendment No. 3) Regulations 2006 (SI 2006/3195)
- The Child Trust Funds (Amendment) Regulations 2009 (SI 2009/475)
- The Child Trust Funds (Amendment No. 2) Regulations 2009 (SI 2009/694)
- The Child Trust Funds (Amendment) Regulations 2010 (SI 2010/582)
- The Child Trust Funds (Amendment No. 2) Regulations 2010 (SI 2010/836)
- The Child Trust Funds (Amendment No. 3) Regulations 2010 (SI 2010/1894)
- The Child Trust Funds (Amendment No. 4) Regulations 2010 (SI 2010/2599)

== Reception ==
The Conservatives described the legislation as not being right to be introduced before the 2005 general election.
