= Regional Assemblies (Preparations) Act 2003 =

Act of the Parliament of the United Kingdom

Regional Assemblies (Preparations) Act 2003 (Note: Section 31.)
- Act of Parliament
- Parliament of the United Kingdom
- Long title: An Act to make provision for the holding of referendums about the establishment of elected assemblies for the regions of England (except London); for reviewing the structure of local government in regions where the holding of a referendum is under consideration; for the holding of referendums about options for implementing the recommendations of such reviews; for implementing the recommendations of such reviews; for the Electoral Commission to give advice in connection with the establishment of assemblies; for payment of grant in connection with the activities of regional chambers; and for incurring expenditure in preparation for assemblies and in connection with the transfer of functions to them.
- Citation: 2003 c. 10
- Introduced by: John Prescott (Commons); Lord Rooker (Lords)
- Territorial extent: United Kingdom

Dates
- Royal assent: 8 May 2003
- Commencement: 8 May 2003 (part 2 (and the schedule), part 4 and sections 27–31); 8 July 2003 (rest of act); (Note: Section 27.)
- Repealed: 1 April 2010
Other legislation
Amended by	Fire and Rescue Services Act 2004; Statistics and Registration Service Act 2007; Local Government and Public Involvement in Health Act 2007; Coroners and Justice Act 2009
Repealed by	Local Democracy, Economic Development and Construction Act 2009

Status: Repealed

Text of statute as originally enacted

Revised text of statute as amended

The Regional Assemblies (Preparations) Act 2003 (c. 10) was an act of the Parliament of the United Kingdom.

== Provisions ==
Its core provision was to allow the Deputy Prime Minister to make orders for referendums in each of the Regions of England on the question of whether they wish to have an elected regional assembly.

The regional assemblies would have had very limited powers.

Three such referendums were expected in 2004, for the regions of North East and North West England and Yorkshire and the Humber.

To win the support of the Liberal Democrats, the act included an amendment to allow voters in areas with two-tier local government to indicate which model of unitary local government they preferred, with both models being developed by the boundary committee of the Electoral Commission.

== Parallel developments ==
Simultaneously, the government announced plans to reorganise local government in the three regions into unitary authorities.

== Subsequent developments ==
The whole act was repealed by section 146 of and part 4 of schedule 7 to the Local Democracy, Economic Development and Construction Act 2009, which came into force on April 2010.

== See also ==
- 2004 North East England devolution referendum
- Referendums in the United Kingdom
