= Patagoniodes =

Scientific classification
- Domain: Eukaryota
- Kingdom: Animalia
- Phylum: Arthropoda
- Class: Insecta
- Order: Lepidoptera
- Family: Pyralidae
- Subfamily: Phycitinae
- Genus: Patagoniodes; Roesler, 1969

Genus of moths

Patagoniodes is a snout moth genus in the subfamily Phycitinae described by Rolf-Ulrich Roesler in 1969.

It currently contains seven species, of which Patagoniodes popescugorji is the type species

== Species ==
- Patagoniodes farinaria (Turner, 1904)
- Patagoniodes hoenei Roesler, 1969
- Patagoniodes kurtharzi Roesler, 1983
- Patagoniodes likiangella Roesler, 1969
- Patagoniodes nipponella Ragonot, 1901
- Patagoniodes popescugorji Roesler, 1969
- Patagoniodes semari Roesler & Kuppers, 1981
