= Transport (Wales) Act 2006 =

Act of the Parliament of the United Kingdom

Transport (Wales) Act 2006 (Note: Section 17.)
- Act of Parliament
- Parliament of the United Kingdom
- Long title: An Act to make provision about transport to, from and within Wales.
- Citation: 2006 c. 5
- Territorial extent: England and Wales (Note: Section 16.)

Dates
- Royal assent: 16 February 2006
- Commencement: 16 February 2006 (sections 12–17); 26 May 2006 (rest of act); (Note: Section 12. The Transport (Wales) Act 2006 (Commencement) Order 2006 (SI 2006/1403).)
Other legislation
Amends	Transport Act 2000
Amended by	Government of Wales Act 2006 (Consequential Modifications and Transitional Provisions) Order 2007; Local Transport Act 2008; Local Government and Elections (Wales) Act 2021; Bus Services (Wales) Act 2026

Status: Partially repealed

History of passage through Parliament

Text of statute as originally enacted

Text of the Transport (Wales) Act 2006 as in force today (including any amendments) within the United Kingdom, from legislation.gov.uk.

The Transport (Wales) Act 2006 (c. 5) is an act of the Parliament of the United Kingdom. It was passed in response to a resolution approved by the National Assembly for Wales on 17 March 2004.

== Background ==
The act was passed alongside the Railways Act 2005 and the Government of Wales Act 2006 and drew upon the recommendations of the Richard Commission on the Assembly's powers.

== Provisions ==
The act transferred certain powers to the Welsh Assembly Government from local authorities.

The act required the Welsh Assembly Government to publish a transport strategy.

=== Section 12 – Commencement ===
The Transport (Wales) Act 2006 (Commencement) Order 2006 (SI 2006/1403 (W.140) (C.48)) was made under this section.

== Reception ==
The act was described alongside the Railways Act 2005 as the largest transfer of powers to the Welsh Assembly between 1999 and 2007 in Contemporary Wales.

== Subsequent developments ==
Sections 2(6) and (7) and 5(9) were repealed, with effect from 2 May 2007, by Schedule 1 to the Government of Wales Act 2006 (Consequential Modifications and Transitional Provisions) Order 2007 (SI 2007/1388).

Paragraphs 2(3), 3(5) and (6) and 5 of the Schedule were repealed, with effect from 11 January 2010 for England and 31 January 2010 for Wales, by section 134(4) of and Part 1 of Schedule 7 to the Local Transport Act 2008, brought into force by SI 2009/3242 and SI 2009/3294.

Section 5 and section 6(1)(a) were omitted, with effect from 21 January 2021, by section 175(1)(e) of and paragraph 49 of Schedule 9 to the Local Government and Elections (Wales) Act 2021.

== Bibliography ==
- Timothy H Jones and Jane M Williams. "Transport (Wales) Act 2006". Current Law Statutes Annotated 2006. Sweet & Maxwell. London. W Green. Edinburgh. 2006. Volume 1. Chapter 5. pp 5-1 to 5-14.
- "Transport (Wales) Act 2006". Halsbury's Statutes of England and Wales. Fourth Edition. LexisNexis. 2008 Reissue of volume 4(1) at page 719. 2009 Reissue of volume 38(2) at pages 676 to 687.
