= Northern Ireland Act 2006 =

Act of the Parliament of the United Kingdom

Northern Ireland Act 2006 (Note: Section 6.)
- Act of Parliament
- Parliament of the United Kingdom
- Long title: An Act to make provision for preparations for the restoration of devolved government in Northern Ireland and for the selection of persons to be Ministers on such restoration; to make provision as to the consequences of selecting or not selecting such persons; and for connected purposes.
- Citation: 2006 c. 17
- Territorial extent: United Kingdom

Dates
- Royal assent: 8 May 2006
- Commencement: 8 May 2006 (Note: Section 4(b) of the Interpretation Act 1978.)
- Repealed: 22 November 2006
Other legislation
Amends	Northern Ireland Act 1998
Repeals/revokes	Northern Ireland Act 2000
Repealed by	Northern Ireland (St Andrews Agreement) Act 2006

Status: Repealed

History of passage through Parliament

Text of statute as originally enacted

Revised text of statute as amended

The Northern Ireland Act 2006 (c. 17) was an act of the Parliament of the United Kingdom. It made provision in connection with the Northern Ireland Assembly. It was repealed by section 22 of the Northern Ireland (St Andrews Agreement) Act 2006.

The legislation recalled the Northern Ireland Assembly to sit on 15 May 2006, with a requirement to form an executive by 24 November. Not meeting the deadline would mean members of the Northern Ireland Assembly would lose their salaries and allowances.

== 15 May 2006 sitting ==
When the Assembly sat on 15 May 2006, the sitting began with a minute's silence for a Catholic teenager who had been beaten to death by a suspected loyalist gang the previous weekend. On this day, the Secretary of State for Northern Ireland, Peter Hain, reaffirmed the commitment that the Assembly would be disbanded if an executive could not be formed.

== See also ==
- Northern Ireland Act

== Bibliography ==
- Halsbury's Statutes
