= Ragwort Control Act 2003 =

Act of the Parliament of the United Kingdom

Ragwort Control Act 2003 (Note: Section 3(1).)
- Act of Parliament
- Parliament of the United Kingdom
- Long title: An Act to amend the Weeds Act 1959 in relation to ragwort; and for connected purposes.
- Citation: 2003 c. 40
- Introduced by: John Greenway (private member's bill) (Commons)
- Territorial extent: England and Wales (Note: Section 3(3).)

Dates
- Royal assent: 20 November 2003
- Commencement: 20 February 2004 (Note: Section 3(2).)
Other legislation
Amends	Weeds Act 1959

Status: Current legislation

Text of statute as originally enacted

Revised text of statute as amended

The Ragwort Control Act 2003 (c. 40) is an act of the Parliament of the United Kingdom.

It creates guidance as a Code of Practice on Ragwort Control, but does not force control, create a responsibility to control or make growing the plant a criminal offence. Common ragwort is considered an "injurious weed" that is harmful to the interests of agriculture.

The first version of the code of practice was published in 2004. This guidance only applied to England.

== Section 1 – Control of ragwort ==
This section inserts section 1A of the Weeds Act 1959 (7 & 8 Eliz. 2. c. 54) which enables the minister (currently will be within DEFRA to make. advice in the form of a code, approved by Parliament, and reads in full:

(1) The Minister may make a code of practice for the purpose of providing guidance on how to prevent the spread of ragwort (senecio jacobaea L.).
(2) Before making the code the Minister must consult such persons as he considers appropriate.
(3) The Minister must lay a copy of the code before Parliament.
(4) The Minister may revise the code; and subsections (2) and (3) apply to the revised code.
(5) The code is to be admissible in evidence.
(6) If the code appears to a court to be relevant to any question arising in proceedings it is to be taken into account in determining that question.

The 2004 code (with amendments) applies only to England and is set out in documents with additional guidance on disposal issued on 15 March 2011 followed by an addendum of 18 April 2012.

== Section 2 – Wales ==
Section 2(1) provides that the reference to the Weeds Act 1959 in schedule 1 to the National Assembly for Wales (Transfer of Functions) Order 1999 (SI 1999/672) is to be treated as referring to that act as amended by the Ragwort Control Act 2003. Section 2(2) provides that this does not affect the power to make further Orders varying or omitting that reference.

== Section 3 – Short title, commencement and extent ==
Section 3(2) provides that the act came into force at the end of the period of three months that began on the date on which it was passed. The word "months" means calendar months. The day (that is to say, 20 November 2003) on which the act was passed (that is to say, received royal assent) is included in the period of three months. This means that the act came into force on 20 February 2004.

== Controversy ==
Country Life magazine questioned the effectiveness of this act in 2006.
