= Scotland Act =

The Scotland Acts are a set of acts of Parliament in the United Kingdom which relate to the creation and devolution of powers to the Scottish Parliament.

The term Scotland Act may refer to:

- Scotland Act 1978 (c. 51), part of an initial attempt at a devolved Scotland (repealed 1979)
- Scotland Act 1998 (c. 46), which formed the devolved Scottish Parliament
- Scotland Act 2012 (c. 11), which devolved further powers (primarily relating to taxation)
- Scotland Act 2016 (c. 11), which devolved a number of transport- and finance-related powers

== See also ==
=== Scottish devolution commissions ===
- Kilbrandon Commission, for the 1978 and 1998 Acts
- Calman Commission, for the 2012 Act
- Smith Commission, for the 2016 Act

=== Other United Kingdom devolution acts ===
- Northern Ireland Act, for acts devolving powers to the Northern Ireland Assembly
- Government of Wales Act (disambiguation), Wales Act for acts devolving powers to the National Assembly for Wales
