= Electricity (Miscellaneous Provisions) Act 2003 =

Act of the Parliament of the United Kingdom

Electricity (Miscellaneous Provisions) Act 2003 (Note: Section 5(1).)
- Act of Parliament
- Parliament of the United Kingdom
- Long title: An Act to make provision in connection with the provision of financial assistance to, or the acquisition of any securities of or any part of the undertaking or assets of, British Energy p.l.c. or any of its subsidiaries; to provide for the repeal of Part 2 of the Electricity Act 1989; to amend Schedule 12 to that Act and to make provision for undertakings to make grants under that Schedule to be disregarded for tax purposes.
- Citation: 2003 c. 9
- Introduced by: Brian Wilson (Commons); Lord Sainsbury of Turville (Lords)
- Territorial extent: Great Britain (Note: Section 5(2). The act does not extend to Northern Ireland.)

Dates
- Royal assent: 8 May 2003
- Commencement: 8 May 2003 (Note: Section 4(b) of the Interpretation Act 1978.)
Other legislation
Amends	Electricity Act 1989
Amended by	Companies Act 2006 (Consequential Amendments, Transitional Provisions and Savings) Order 2009

Status: Amended

Text of statute as originally enacted

Text of the Electricity (Miscellaneous Provisions) Act 2003 as in force today (including any amendments) within the United Kingdom, from legislation.gov.uk.

The Electricity (Miscellaneous Provisions) Act 2003 (c. 9) is an act of the Parliament of the United Kingdom which facilitated the Government's response to the financial difficulties of British Energy.

== Background ==
In the summer of 2002 British Energy, the UK's only private sector nuclear electricity generator, was in serious financial difficulties and was on the point of running out of cash completely. This may have triggered a sudden and unplanned insolvency that would have posed a risk to nuclear safety and the security of electricity supplies. Financial support was therefore required to ensure that nuclear stations could continue to operate safely.

The government extended a loan facility to the company to allow time for an investigation into the possibilities of a restructuring package to be undertaken. It was also necessary to consider how nuclear liabilities could be dealt with safely, effectively and at least cost to the taxpayer.

== Provisions ==
The act allows for the nationalisation of British Energy if it went bankrupt.

The act received royal assent on 8 May 2003. It came into force on the date that it received royal assent.

The act comprises five sections:

- Section 1: Expenditure relating to British Energy plc. This provides authority for expenditure relating to British Energy to be paid out of money provided by Parliament. It authorises expenditure in connection with the acquisition of a British Energy company, its business or its assets. It also authorises continued funding if the Government acquires the business and/or assets of a British Energy company.
- Section 2: Removal of restrictions on capacity to acquire certain securities. Part 2 of the Electricity Act 1989 restructured the Electricity Industry, allowing for its subsequent sale; the purpose of Part 2 no longer has effect and is now irrelevant. However, there are two sections, section 72 and 74, which may have affected the Government's freedom to take some of the actions contemplated by section 1. This section repeals both of those sections.
- Section 3: Amendment of Schedule 12 to the Electricity Act 1989. Schedule 12 to the Electricity Act 1989 provides the Government with the power to give financial assistance in relation to nuclear liabilities, such as dealing with spent fuel and decommissioning costs. It sets a ceiling on the level of assistance at £1 billion. This section removes the ceiling on financial assistance.
- Section 4: Undertaking to provide assistance disregarded for tax purposes. It allows the initial recognition of a Government undertaking to make a grant under Schedule 12 to the Electricity Act in respect of qualifying expenditure in a company's accounts would not be included in the tax computation (“a disregard”).
- Section 5: Short title and extent. This act does not extend to Northern Ireland.

== Effects of the act ==
The act is an enabling act and provides authority to the Secretary of State to incur expenditure on British Energy plc or its subsidiaries.

It amends the Electricity Act 1989 to remove the barrier to the Government acquiring shares in ‘successor companies’ and provides for the repeal of part 2 of that act.

It amends the 1989 act to remove the ceiling on financial assistance by the Government in relation to nuclear liabilities and to change the tax status of such assistance.

== Reception ==
The Conservatives criticised the legislation, asking the government to reconsider and reshape it, during its passage.

== See also ==
- Timeline of the UK electricity supply industry
