= Government of Wales Act =

There have been two Government of Wales acts of the UK Parliament:

- The Government of Wales Act 1998 (c. 38), founding Wales's legislature
- The Government of Wales Act 2006 (c. 32), extending its powers and creating the Welsh Government

== See also ==
- Wales Act, several pieces of legislation
- Northern Ireland Act, several pieces of legislation
- Scotland Act (disambiguation)
