= Savings Accounts and Health in Pregnancy Grant Act 2010 =

Act of the Parliament of the United Kingdom

Savings Accounts and Health in Pregnancy Grant Act 2010 (Note: Section 4(1).)
- Act of Parliament
- Parliament of the United Kingdom
- Long title: An Act to make provision about Saving Gateway accounts; and for connected purposes.
- Citation: 2010 c. 36
- Introduced by: George Osborne MP, Chancellor of the Exchequer (Commons); Lord Sassoon (Lords)
- Territorial extent: England and Wales; Scotland; Northern Ireland; (Note: Section 4(4)–(6).)

Dates
- Royal assent: 16 December 2010
- Commencement: 16 December 2010 (except section 2); 16 February 2011 (section 2); (Note: Section 4(2)–(3).)
Other legislation
Amends	Social Security Contributions and Benefits Act 1992; Social Security Administration Act 1992; Social Security Contributions and Benefits (Northern Ireland) Act 1992; Social Security Administration (Northern Ireland) Act 1992; Northern Ireland Act 1998; Child Trust Funds Act 2004; Corporation Tax Act 2010
Repeals/revokes	Saving Gateway Accounts Act 2009

Status: Current legislation

History of passage through Parliament

Text of statute as originally enacted

Revised text of statute as amended

The Savings Accounts and Health in Pregnancy Grant Act 2010 (c. 36) is an act of the Parliament of the United Kingdom. It ends government support of Child Trust Funds, the Saving Gateway and the Health in Pregnancy Grant.

== Provisions ==
The act amends the Child Trust Funds Act 2004 by closing the funds to new applicants starting in January 2011. Existing accounts would however continue to function as before. The Act also repealed the Saving Gateway Accounts Act 2009 and removed the Health in Pregnancy Grant.

== Reception ==
The Labour Party accused the Conservatives of reneging on their election pledge to not abolish Child Trust Funds.
