= Northern Ireland (St Andrews Agreement) Act 2006 =

Act of Parliament of the United Kingdom

Northern Ireland (St Andrews Agreement) Act 2006 (Note: Section 28.)
- Act of Parliament
- Parliament of the United Kingdom
- Long title: An Act to make provision for preparations for the restoration of devolved government in Northern Ireland in accordance with the St Andrews Agreement; to make provision as to the consequences of compliance, or non-compliance, with the St Andrews Agreement timetable; to amend the Northern Ireland Act 1998; to make provision about district policing partnerships; to amend the Education (Northern Ireland) Orders 1997 and 2006; and for connected purposes.
- Citation: 2006 c. 53
- Introduced by: Peter Hain MP, Secretary of State for Northern Ireland (Commons); Lord Rooker (Lords)
- Territorial extent: England and Wales; Scotland; Northern Ireland; (Note: Section 26. Except for sections 20 and 21 and schedules 8 and 9, which extend only to Northern Ireland.)

Dates
- Royal assent: 22 November 2006
- Commencement: Various (Note: Section 27.)
Other legislation
Amends	Education (Northern Ireland) Order 1997; Northern Ireland Act 1998; Education (Northern Ireland) Orders 1997; Police (Northern Ireland) Act 2000; Police (Northern Ireland) Act 2003; Northern Ireland (Miscellaneous Provisions) Act 2006; Education (Northern Ireland) Order 2006
Repeals/revokes	Northern Ireland Act 2006
Amended by	Northern Ireland (St Andrews Agreement) Act 2006; Northern Ireland (St Andrews Agreement) Act 2007; Northern Ireland Assembly Members Act 2010; Justice Act (Northern Ireland) 2011
Relates to	Northern Ireland Act 2000; Northern Ireland Assembly (Elections) Order 2001

Status: Amended

History of passage through Parliament

Text of statute as originally enacted

Revised text of statute as amended

The Northern Ireland (St Andrews Agreement) Act 2006 (c. 53) is an act of the Parliament of the United Kingdom. It implemented the St Andrews Agreement. It is modified by section 1 of the Northern Ireland (St Andrews Agreement) Act 2007.

== Provisions ==
Section in the act	Section in the agreement	Provision
Section 1	The Transitional Assembly	The 2006 act required that the Northern Ireland Assembly act meet as a "transitional assembly".
Section 2	Repeal of the Northern Ireland Act 2000	The Northern Ireland Act 2000 was repealed by the 2006 act.
Section 3	Next Northern Ireland Assembly election	The 2006 act required that the next Northern Ireland Assembly election happen on 11 March 2007, with an executive due to be formed by 26 March 2007.
Section 4	Remuneration of members	The 2006 act enabled the scrapping of salaries of members of the assembly.
Section 5	A statutory ministerial Code	The 2006 act amended the Northern Ireland Act 1998 to include a statutory ministerial code. This makes the Northern Ireland Executive the first, and as of 2021 only, government in the United Kingdom to have a statutory ministerial code.
Section 6	Assembly referrals for Executive review	The 2006 act amended the Northern Ireland Act 1998 to allow that if 30 or more MLAs are unhappy with a ministerial decision, they can refer it back to the executive for review.
Section 7	Amendments to the Pledge of Office	The 2006 act amended the Pledge of Office to include an endorsement of the police and courts.
Section 8	Appointment of Ministers in the Executive	The 2006 act amended the Northern Ireland Act 1998 to require that the First Minister will normally come from the largest party within the largest designation. Unlike the text of the agreement, the act requires that the largest party chooses the First Minister no matter the size of their designation.
Section 9	Department with policing and justice functions	The 2006 act amended the Northern Ireland Act 1998 to establish a department of the Northern Ireland Executive with responsibility for policing and justice. This was not actually implemented, until the Northern Ireland Act 2009.
Section 10	Committee of the Centre	The 2006 act put the Committee of the Centre, which oversaw the Office of the First Minister and deputy First Minister, on a statutory basis.
Section 11	Reviews	The 2006 act put established the Assembly and Executive Review committee.
Section 12	Attendance at NSMC and BIC	The 2006 act allows for ministers and junior ministers in the Executive to be able to attend the NSMC and BIC if an issue within the portfolio is within their portfolio.
Section 13	Community designation	The 2006 act amended the Northern Ireland Act 1998 to require that MLAs can only change their community designation if they change their political party affiliation.
Section 14	Power of Executive Committee to call for witnesses and documents	The 2006 act allows for the Executive Committee (the Executive) to call for witnesses and documents, like other committees of the Assembly, but with certain modifications.
Section 15	Irish language and Ulster Scots language strategies	The 2006 act amended the Northern Ireland Act 1998 to require the executive to publish a strategy relating to the Irish Language, and a strategy relating to the Ulster Scots Language.
Section 16	Anti-poverty strategy	The 2006 act amended the Northern Ireland Act 1998 to require the executive to publish an anti-poverty strategy.
Section 17	Vacancy in the Assembly	The 2006 act allowed for political parties to exercise the votes of members elected under them, who had become deceased.
Section 18	Report on progress towards devolution of policing and justice matters	The 2006 act required the Assembly to submit a report to the Secretary of State by 27 March 2008. The report was completed by the Assembly and Executive Review Committee and published on 11 March 2008. It said that there had been little progress on the devolution of policing and justice matters.
Section 19	Minor and consequential amendments	
Section 20	District policing partnerships	District policing partnerships, which had been set up by the Police (Northern Ireland) Act 2000, were reconstituted.
Section 21	Amendment of the Education (Northern Ireland) Order 2006	The Education (Northern Ireland) Order 2006 was amended to delay its implementation prohibiting academic selection until after the executive was restored.
Section 22	Repeal of the Northern Ireland Act 2006	The Northern Ireland (St Andrews Agreement) Act 2006 repealed the Northern Ireland Act 2006 in its entirety.
Section 23	Delegated legislation	
Section 24	Parliamentary procedure	
Section 25	Interpretation	
Section 26	Extent	
Section 27	Commencement	

== Northern Ireland (St Andrews Agreement) Act 2007 ==
Northern Ireland (St Andrews Agreement) Act 2007 (Note: Section 2.)
- Act of Parliament
- Parliament of the United Kingdom
- Long title: An Act to modify the effect of the Northern Ireland (St Andrews Agreement) Act 2006.
- Citation: 2007 c. 4
- Territorial extent: United Kingdom

Dates
- Royal assent: 27 March 2007
- Commencement: 27 March 2007 (Note: Section 4(b) of the Interpretation Act 1978.)

Status: Current legislation

History of passage through Parliament

Text of statute as originally enacted

Revised text of statute as amended

The Northern Ireland (St Andrews Agreement) Act 2007 (c. 4) is an act of the Parliament of the United Kingdom. The Act extended the statutory deadline for the restoration of the Northern Ireland Assembly to 8 May 2007.

During the passage of the 2007 act, the Northern Ireland Secretary, Peter Hain praised Ian Paisley's "courage and leadership" for engaging with Gerry Adams.

== See also ==
- Northern Ireland Act
