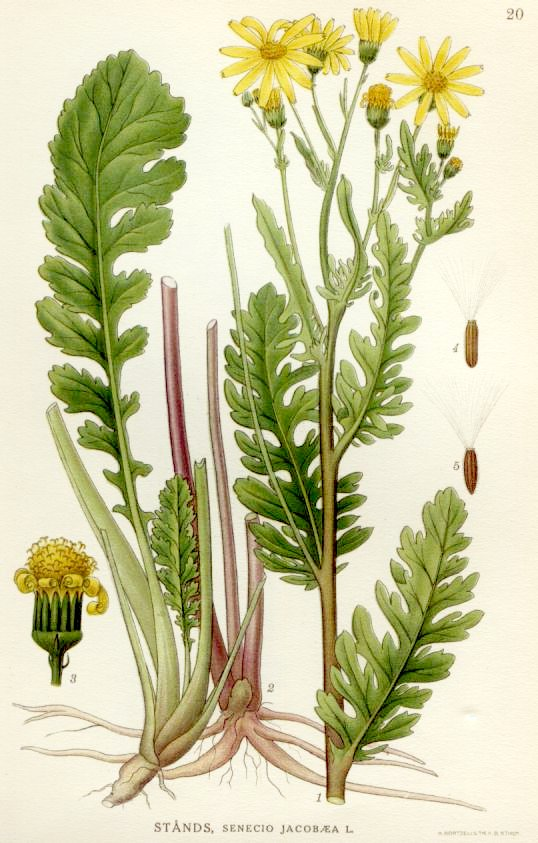

Scientific classification
- Kingdom: Plantae
- Clade: Tracheophytes
- Clade: Angiosperms
- Clade: Eudicots
- Clade: Asterids
- Order: Asterales
- Family: Asteraceae
- Genus: Jacobaea
- Species: J. vulgaris

Binomial name
- Jacobaea vulgaris Gaertn.

Synonyms
- Senecio jacobaea L.

= Jacobaea vulgaris =

Species of flowering plant in the daisy family

Jacobaea vulgaris, also called Senecio jacobaea, is a very common wildflower in the family Asteraceae that is native to northern Eurasia, usually in dry, open places, and has also been widely distributed as a weed elsewhere.

Common names include ragwort, common ragwort, stinking willie, tansy ragwort, benweed, cushag, St. James-wort, stinking nanny/ninny/willy, staggerwort, dog standard, cankerwort, stammerwort. In the western United States it is generally known as tansy ragwort, or tansy, though its resemblance to the true tansy is superficial.

In the British Isles, where it is native, it is considered ecologically important due to its nectar and stems being fed on by multiple insects, such as the cinnabar moth. It is often treated as a weed in pastures due to its toxicity to cattle and horses, as well as to humans. In some locations, it is considered an invasive species.

== Description ==
The plant is generally considered to be biennial but it has the tendency to exhibit perennial properties under certain cultural conditions (such as when subjected to repeated grazing or mowing). The stems are erect, straight, have no or few hairs, and reach a height of 0.3–2.0 metres (1 ft 0 in – 6 ft 7 in). The leaves are pinnately lobed and the end lobe is blunt. The many names that include the word "stinking" (and Mare's Fart) arise because of the unpleasant smell of the leaves. The hermaphrodite flower heads are 1.5–2.5 centimetres (0.6–1.0 in) diameter, and are borne in dense, flat-topped clusters; the florets are bright yellow. It has a long flowering period lasting from June to November (in the Northern Hemisphere).

Pollination is by a wide range of bees, flies and moths and butterflies. Over a season, one plant may produce 2,000 to 2,500 yellow flowers in 20- to 60-headed, flat-topped corymbs. The achenes have dandelion-like groups of prickly hairs called pappuses, which help seed dispersal by the wind. The number of seeds produced may be as large as 75,000 to 120,000, although in its native range in Eurasia very few of these would grow into new plants and research has shown that most seeds do not travel a great distance from the parent plant.

== Taxonomy ==
Two subspecies are accepted:

- Jacobaea vulgaris ssp. vulgaris – the typical plant, with ray florets present.
- Jacobaea vulgaris ssp. dunensis – the ray florets are missing.

== Distribution ==
Ragwort is native to the Eurasian continent. In Europe it is widely spread, from Scandinavia to the Mediterranean. In Great Britain and Ireland, where it is native, it is listed as an injurious weed under the weeds act and Ragwort Control Act.

Ragwort is common in disturbed soil such as in waste land, waysides and grazing pastures. Its natural habitat is sand dunes, but it is commonly found along road sides, railways and in light, low fertility soil.

It has been introduced in many other regions, and is listed as a weed in many. These include:

- North America: The United States, present mainly in the northwest and northeast: California, Idaho, Illinois, Maine, Massachusetts, Michigan, Montana, New Jersey, New York, Oregon, Pennsylvania, and Washington;
- South America: Argentina;
- Africa: North Africa;
- Asia: India and Siberia;
- Australasia: a widespread weed in New Zealand and Australia.

== Ecological importance ==
Although the plant is often unwanted by landowners because of its toxic effect for cattle and horses, and because it is considered a weed by many, it provides a great deal of nectar for pollinators. It was rated in the top 10 for most nectar production (nectar per unit cover per year) in a UK plants survey conducted by the AgriLand project which is supported by the UK Insect Pollinators Initiative. It also was the top producer of nectar sugar in another study in Britain, with a production per floral unit of (2921 ± 448 μg).

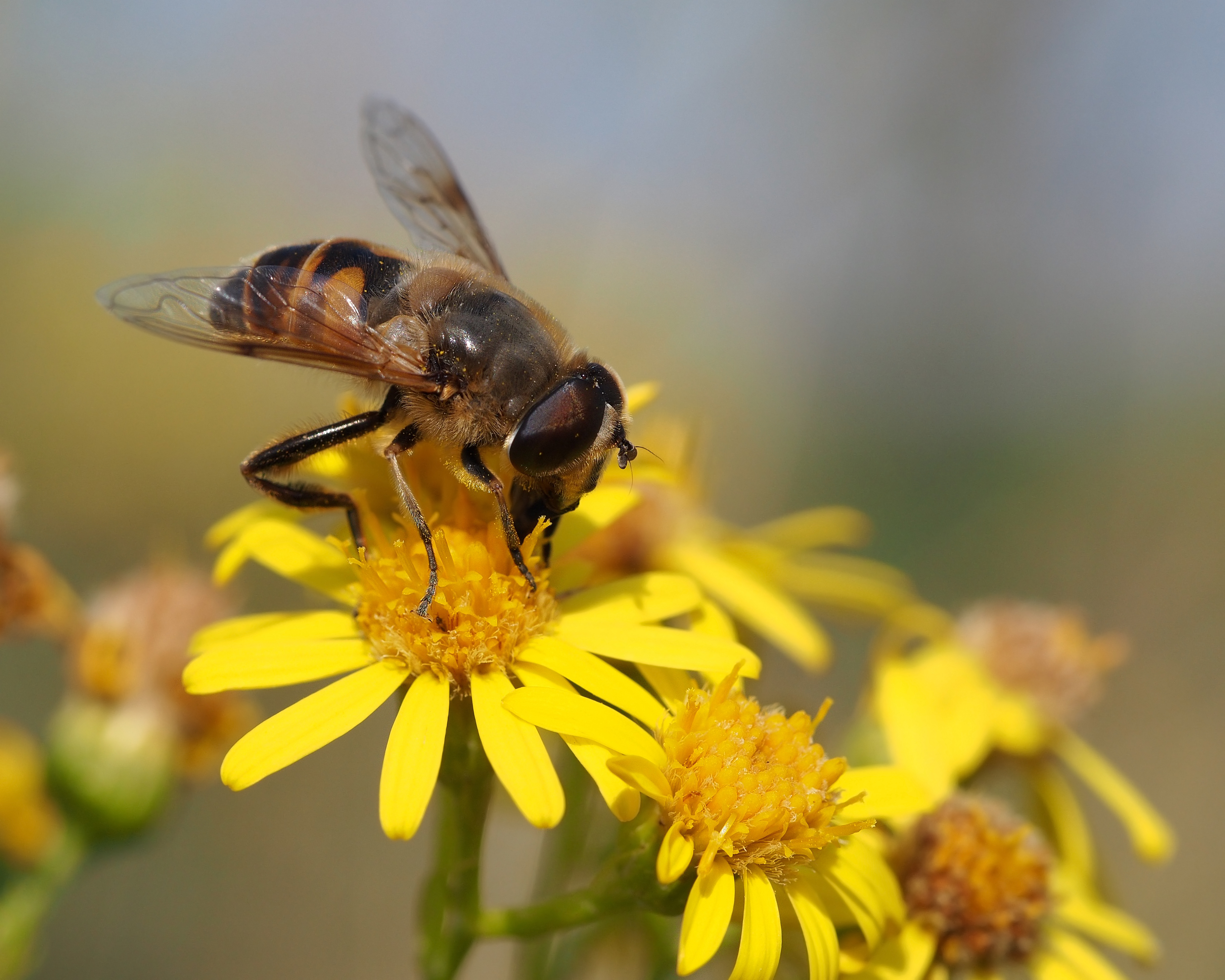
Drone fly on ragwort

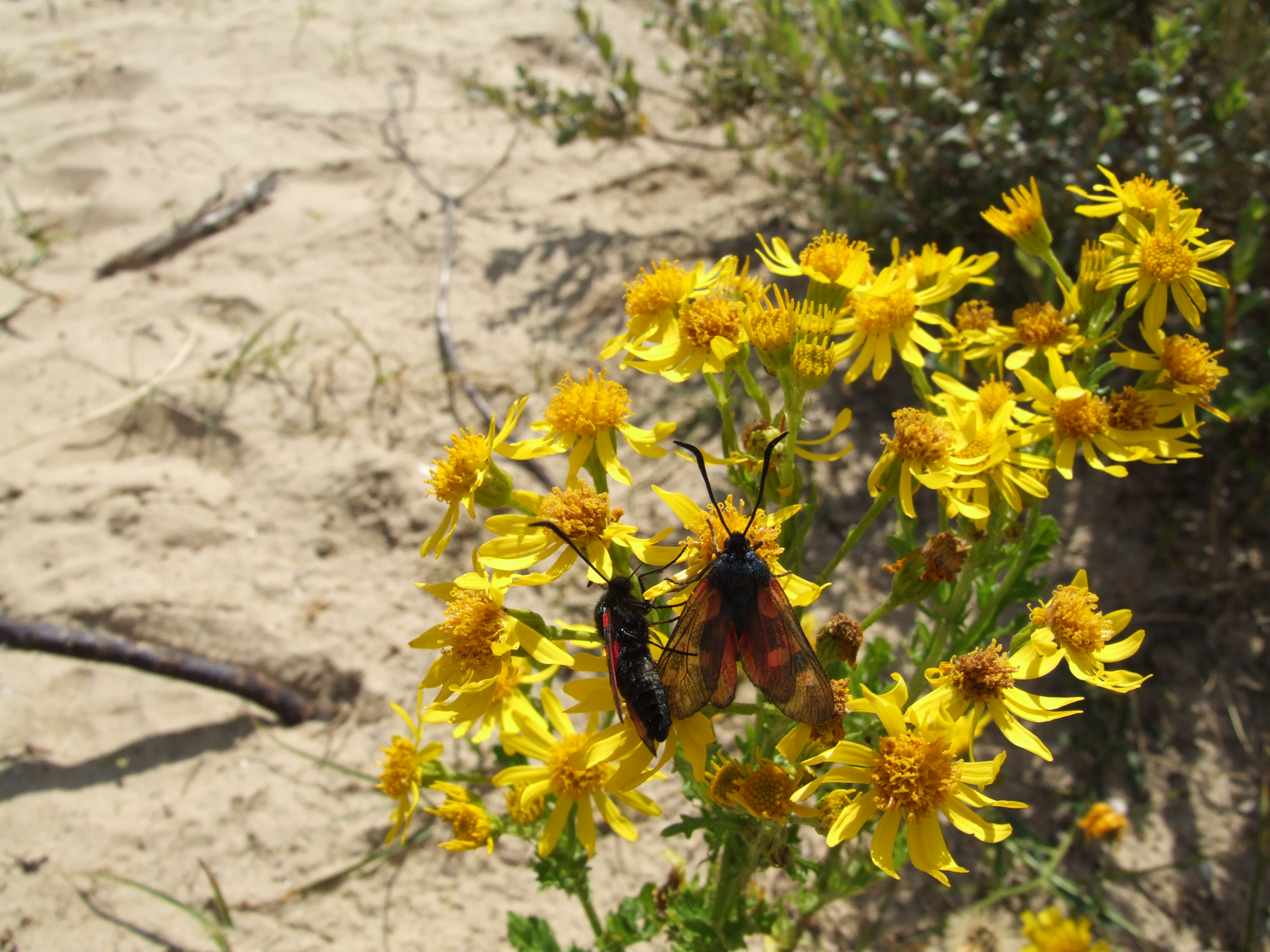
Jacobaea vulgaris

In the United Kingdom, where the plant is native, ragwort provides a home and food source to at least 77 insect species. Thirty of these species of invertebrate use ragwort exclusively as their food source and there are another 22 species where ragwort forms a significant part of their diet.

English Nature identifies a further 117 species that use ragwort as a nectar source whilst travelling between feeding and breeding sites, or between metapopulations. These consist mainly of solitary bees, hoverflies, moths, and butterflies such as the small copper butterfly (Lycaena phlaeas). Pollen is collected by solitary bees.

Besides the fact that ragwort is very attractive to such a vast array of insects, some of these are very rare indeed. Of the 30 species that specifically feed on ragwort alone, seven are officially deemed nationally scarce. A further three species are on the IUCN Red List. In short, ragwort is an exclusive food source for ten rare or threatened insect species, including the cinnabar moth (Tyria jacobaeae), the picture winged fly (Campiglossa malaris), the scarce clouded knot horn moth (Homoeosoma nimbella), and the Sussex emerald moth (Thalera fimbrialis). The Sussex Emerald has been labelled a Priority Species in the United Kingdom Biodiversity Action Plan. A priority species is one which is "scarce, threatened and declining". The remainder of the ten threatened species include three species of leaf beetle, another picture-winged fly, and three micro moths. All of these species are Nationally Scarce B, with one leaf beetle categorised as Nationally Scarce A.

The most common of those species that are totally reliant on ragwort for their survival is the cinnabar moth. The cinnabar is a United Kingdom Biodiversity Action Plan Species, its status described as "common and widespread, but rapidly declining".

== Poisonous effects ==
Structure of senecionine

Ragwort contains many different alkaloids, making it poisonous to many animals. (EHC 80, section 9.1.4). Alkaloids which have been found in the plant confirmed by the WHO report EHC 80 are jacobine, jaconine, jacozine, otosenine, retrorsine, seneciphylline, senecionine, and senkirkine (p. 322 Appendix II). There is a strong variation between plants from the same location in distribution between the possible alkaloids and even the absolute amount of alkaloids varies drastically.

Ragwort is of particular concern to people who keep horses and cattle. In areas of the world where ragwort is a native plant, such as Britain and continental Europe, documented cases of proven poisoning are rare. Horses and cattle normally recognize and do not eat fresh ragwort due to its taste. However, they may still consume it if there is not enough other food. Further, if ragwort is included in hay or silage, livestock will not be able to recognize it, and it will moreover contaminate the entire batch. The result, if sufficient quantity is consumed, can be irreversible cirrhosis of the liver of a form identified as megalocytosis where cells are abnormally enlarged. Signs that a horse has been poisoned include yellow mucous membranes, depression, and lack of coordination.

There is no definitive test for the poisoning however, since megalocytosis is not a change in the liver which is specific to ragwort poisoning. It is also seen in poisoning by other alkylating agents, such as nitrosamines and aflatoxins. Aflatoxins are a common contaminant formed in feedstuffs by moulds. Research in the United Kingdom has produced results showing megalocytosis, which may be due to various causes, to be a relatively uncommon cause of liver disease in horses.

The alkaloid does not actually accumulate in the liver but a breakdown product can damage DNA and progressively kills cells. About 3--7% of the body weight is sometimes claimed as deadly for horses, but an example in the scientific literature exists of a horse surviving being fed over 20% of its body weight. The effect of low doses is lessened by the destruction of the original alkaloids by the action of bacteria in the digestive tract before they reach the bloodstream. There is no known antidote or cure for poisoning, but examples are known from the scientific literature of horses making a full recovery once consumption has been stopped.

The alkaloids can be absorbed in small quantities through the skin but studies have shown that the absorption is very much less than by ingestion. Also they are in the N-oxide form which only becomes toxic after conversion inside the digestive tract and they will be excreted harmlessly.

Some sensitive individuals can suffer from an allergic reaction because ragwort, like many members of the family Compositae, contains sesquiterpene lactones which can cause compositae dermatitis. These are different from the pyrrolizidine alkaloids which are responsible for the toxic effects.

Honey collected from ragwort has been found to contain small quantities of jacoline, jacobine, jacozine, senecionine, and seneciphylline, but the quantities have been judged as too minute to be of concern.

== Control ==
As indicated above, common ragwort has become a problem in several areas in which it has been introduced, and various methods are employed to help prevent its spread.

In many Australian states ragwort has been declared a noxious weed, and landholders are required to remove it from their property by law. In the island state of Tasmania, ragwort is responsible for more than half of the total costs of that state's control of invasive species. The species has been calculated as the 8th most expensive invasive species in terms of cost to Australian farmers, at over A$500m over 60 years.

It is also legislated as a noxious weed in New Zealand, where farmers sometimes bring in helicopters to spray their farms if the ragwort is too widespread.

=== Legislation ===
==== Ireland ====
In Ireland, the Noxious Weeds (Thistle, Ragwort, and Dock) Order 1937, issued under the Noxious Weeds Act 1936, declares ragwort as a noxious weed, requiring landowners to control its growth.

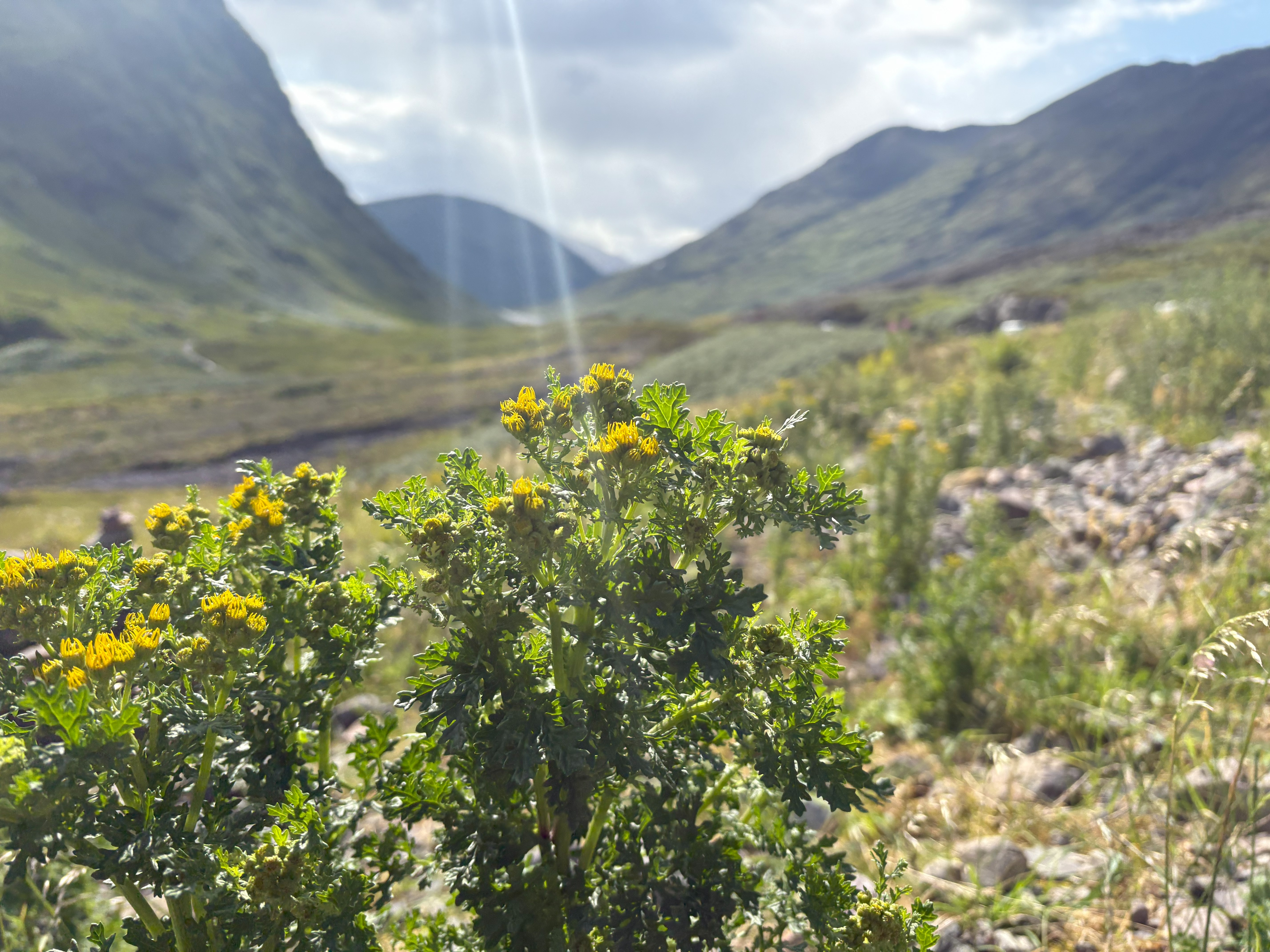
Blooming ragwort located in Glen Coe in the Highlands of Scotland

==== United Kingdom ====
In the United Kingdom, common ragwort (Senecio jacobaea) is one of the five plants named as an injurious weed under the provisions of the Weeds Act 1959. The word injurious in this context indicates that it could be harmful to agriculture, not that it is dangerous to animals, as all the other injurious weeds listed are non-toxic. Under the terms of this Act, a land occupier can be required by the Secretary of State for Environment, Food and Rural Affairs to prevent the spread of the plant. However, the growth of the plant is not made illegal by the Act and there is no statutory obligation for control placed upon landowners in general.

The Ragwort Control Act 2003 provides for a code of practice, which the government states is guidance, on ragwort and does not place any further legal responsibilities on landowners to control the plant.

=== Biological control ===
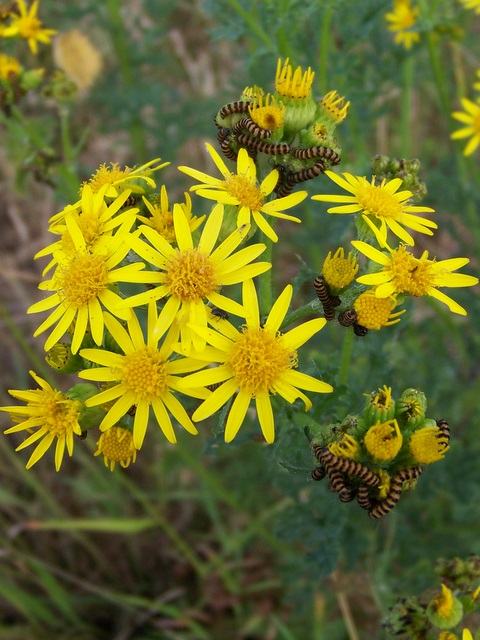
Flowering plant with cinnabar moth caterpillars

Ragwort is a food plant for the larvae of Cochylis atricapitana, Phycitodes maritima, and Phycitodes saxicolais. Ragwort is best known as the food of caterpillars of the cinnabar moth Tyria jacobaeae. They absorb alkaloids from the plant and become distasteful to predators, a fact advertised by the black and yellow warning colours. The red and black, day-flying adult moth is also distasteful to many potential predators. The moth is used as a control for ragwort in countries in which it has been introduced and become a problem, like New Zealand and the western United States. As both larvae and adults are distinctly colored and marked, identification of cinnabars is easy outside of their natural range, and grounds and range keepers can quickly recognize them. In both countries, the tansy ragwort flea beetle (Longitarsus jacobaeae) has been introduced to combat the plant. Another beetle, Longitarsus ganglbaueri, also feeds on ragwort, but will feed on other plants as well, making it an unsuitable biological control. Another biological control agent introduced in the western United States is the ragwort seed fly, although it is not considered very effective at controlling ragwort. The biological control of ragwort was already used in the 1930s.

== Other usage ==
In ancient Greece and Rome a supposed aphrodisiac was made from the plant; it was called satyrion.

The leaves can be used to obtain a good green dye, although it fades. The flowers can be used to produce a dye that is yellow when the fabric is mordanted with alum. Brown and orange dyes are also reported.

== Literature, poetry and mythology ==
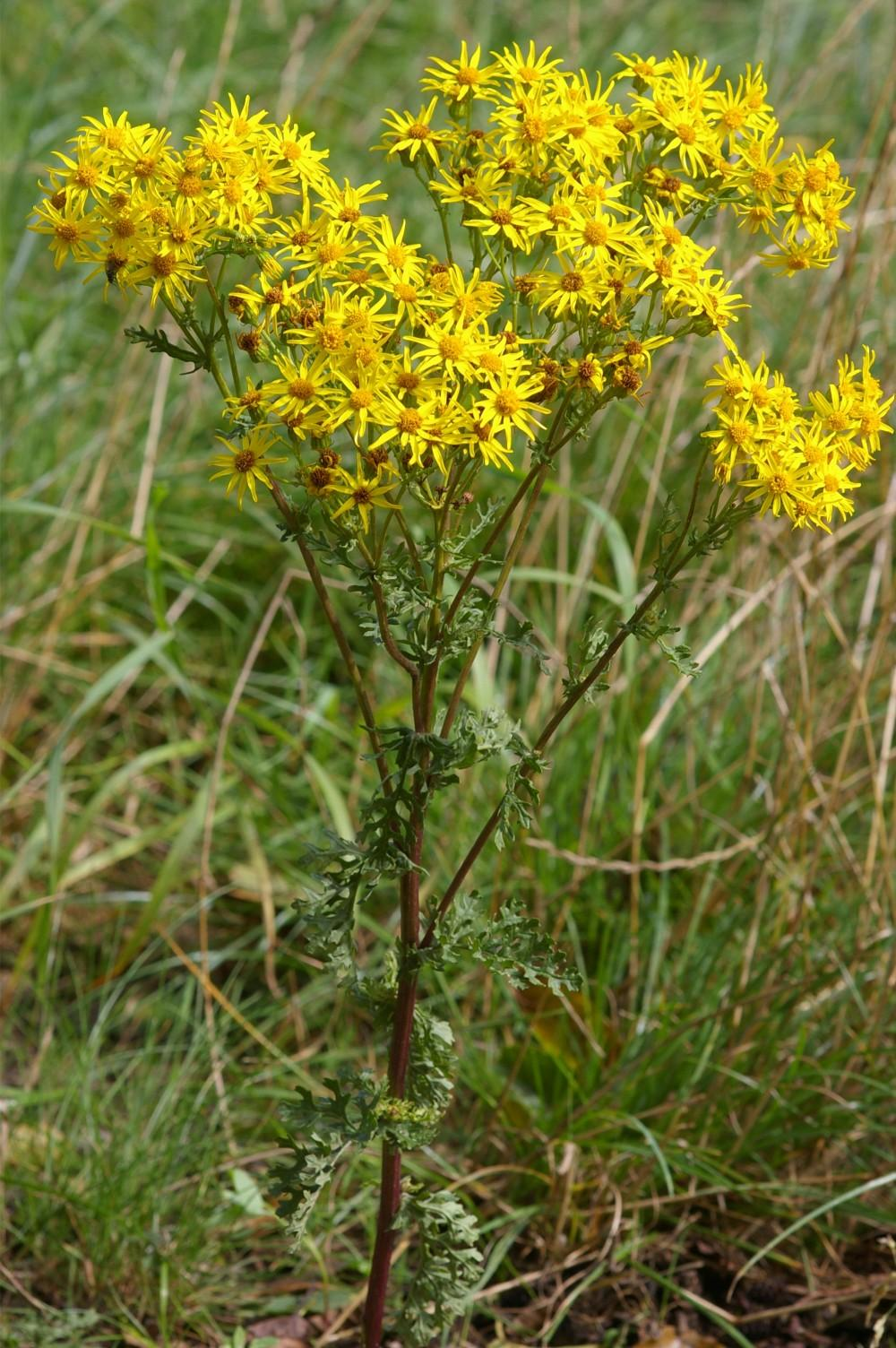
Ragwort thou humble flower

The Greek physician Pedanius Dioscorides (c. 40–90 CE) recommended the herb. The two "fathers" of herbalism, Gerard and Culpeper, also recommended the herb. Culpeper was an astrological botanist and thought the plant was "under the command of Dame Venus, and [it] cleanses, digests, and discusses."

The poet John Clare had a more positive opinion of the plant, as revealed in this poem of 1831:

Ragwort thou humble flower with tattered leaves
I love to see thee come and litter gold...
Thy waste of shining blossoms richly shields
The sun tanned sward in splendid hues that burn
So bright and glaring that the very light
Of the rich sunshine doth to paleness turn
And seems but very shadows in thy sight.

The ragwort, under its Manx name Cushag, is the national flower of the Isle of Man According to one story King Orry chose as his emblem the cushag flower, as its twelve petals represent the isles of the Kingdom of Mann and the Isles: the Isle of Man, Arran, Bute, Islay, Jura, Mull, Iona, Eigg, Rum, Skye, Raasay, and the Outer Hebrides. The ragwort, in fact, usually has thirteen petals. The Manx poet Josephine Kermode (1852–1937) wrote the following poem about the Cushag:

Now, the Cushag, we know,
Must never grow,
Where the farmer's work is done.
But along the rills,
In the heart of the hills,
The Cushag may shine like the sun.
Where the golden flowers,
Have fairy powers,
To gladden our hearts with their grace.
And in Vannin Veg Veen,
In the valleys green,
The Cushags have still a place.

(Vannin Veg Veen is Manx for dear little Isle of Man.)

Donald Macalastair of Druim-a-ghinnir on the Isle of Arran told a story of the fairies journeying to Ireland. The ragwort was their transport and every one of them picked a plant, sat astride and arrived in Ireland in an instant.

== See also ==
- List of plants poisonous to equines
- Cichorieae, a tribe also in the family Asteraceae with similar looking genera (Agoseris, Leontodon, Sonchus, etc.)
- Cineraria, a genus also in the tribe Senecioneae with similar looking species
- Senecio vulgaris
