= Sustainable Energy Act 2003 =

Act of the Parliament of the United Kingdom

Sustainable Energy Act 2003 (Note: Section 9(1).)
- Act of Parliament
- Parliament of the United Kingdom
- Long title: An Act to make provision about the development and promotion of a sustainable energy policy; to amend the Utilities Act 2000; and for connected purposes.
- Citation: 2003 c. 30
- Introduced by: Brian White (Commons); Baroness Maddock (Lords)
- Territorial extent: United Kingdom (Note: Section 9(2) to (4). Sections 2 to 5 and 7 extend to England and Wales only, and section 6 to England and Wales and Scotland only.)

Dates
- Royal assent: 30 October 2003
- Commencement: Various (Note: Section 9(5) to (7).)
Other legislation
Amends	Utilities Act 2000
Amended by	Energy Act 2004; Climate Change and Sustainable Energy Act 2006; Energy Act 2008; Energy Act 2011; Treaty of Lisbon (Changes in Terminology) Order 2011; Deregulation Act 2015

Status: Partially repealed

Text of statute as originally enacted

Text of the Sustainable Energy Act 2003 as in force today (including any amendments) within the United Kingdom, from legislation.gov.uk.

The Sustainable Energy Act 2003 (c. 30) is an act of the Parliament of the United Kingdom.

== Legislative passage ==
The white paper "Our energy future – creating a low carbon economy" (Cm 5761), published in February 2003, is a precursor of this act.

The legislation was passed as a private member's bill.

== Provisions ==
The act set various sustainable energy targets and allocated £60,000,000 to renewable energy. The government was required to publish a statutory target for residential energy efficiency which was fulfilled in 2004, when the government published a target to reduce carbon emissions by 4.2 metric tonnes by 2010.

== Section 9 – Citation, extent and commencement ==
The following orders have been made under this section:

- The Sustainable Energy Act 2003 (Commencement No. 1) Order 2003 (SI 2003/2986 (C. 110))
- The Sustainable Energy Act 2003 (Commencement No. 2) Order 2004 (SI 2004/1203 (C. 51))

== Bibliography ==
- "Sustainable Energy Act 2003". Current Law Statutes 2003. Sweet & Maxwell. London. W Green. Edinburgh. 2003. Volume 2. Chapter 30. pp 30-1 to 30-9.
- Halsbury's Statutes
