= Northern Ireland (Monitoring Commission etc.) Act 2003 =

Act of the Parliament of the United Kingdom

Northern Ireland (Monitoring Commission etc.) Act 2003 (Note: Section 12(1).)
- Act of Parliament
- Parliament of the United Kingdom
- Long title: An Act to make provision in connection with the establishment under international law of an independent commission with monitoring functions in relation to Northern Ireland; to make further provision about exclusion from Ministerial office in Northern Ireland; to make provision about reduction of remuneration of members of the Northern Ireland Assembly; to make provision about reduction of financial assistance under the Financial Assistance for Political Parties Act (Northern Ireland) 2000; to make provision about censure resolutions of the Northern Ireland Assembly; and for connected purposes.
- Citation: 2003 c. 25
- Introduced by: Paul Murphy (Commons); Lord Williams of Mostyn (Lords)
- Territorial extent: United Kingdom

Dates
- Royal assent: 18 September 2003
- Commencement: Various (Note: Section 12(2).)
Other legislation
Amends	Northern Ireland Act 1998
Relates to	Financial Assistance for Political Parties Act (Northern Ireland) 2000

Status: Current legislation

Text of statute as originally enacted

Text of the Northern Ireland (Monitoring Commission etc.) Act 2003 as in force today (including any amendments) within the United Kingdom, from legislation.gov.uk.

The Northern Ireland (Monitoring Commission etc.) Act 2003 (c. 25) is an act of the Parliament of the United Kingdom.

== Background ==
The establishment of the Monitoring Commission was one of the key demands of the Ulster Unionist Party following its decision to collapse the Assembly on the basis of allegations of IRA activity.

== Provisions ==
The legislation implemented what was agreed in the British-Irish joint declaration.

== Commencement ==
Section 12 came into force on 18 September 2003.

The following orders were made under section 12(2):

- The Northern Ireland (Monitoring Commission etc.) Act 2003 (Commencement No. 1) Order 2003 (SI 2003/2646) (C 101)
- The Northern Ireland (Monitoring Commission etc.) Act 2003 (Commencement No. 2) Order 2004 (SI 2004/83) (C 3)

Section 1 came into force on 13 October 2003 and sections 2 to 11 came into force on 7 January 2004.

== Subsequent developments ==
Sections 1 to 3 and 11, and sections 30A, 47B and 51B of the Northern Ireland Act 1998, ceased to have effect at the end of 31 March 2011 under section 12(3), by the Northern Ireland (Monitoring Commission etc.) Act 2003 (Cessation of Provisions) Order 2011 (SI 2011/978).

== See also ==
- Northern Ireland Act
