= Wales Act =

Wales Act may refer to:

- Wales Act 1978 (c. 52), introducing a limited measure of self-government (never implemented)
- Wales Act 2014 (c. 29), devolving powers to Wales (Silk Commission)
- Wales Act 2017 (c. 7), devolving powers to Wales (St David's Day Agreement)

== See also ==
- Government of Wales Act
- Scotland Act
- Northern Ireland Act
