= Marine Safety Act 2003 =

Public General Act of Parliament of the United Kingdom

- Act of Parliament
- Parliament of the United Kingdom
- Long title: An Act to make provision about the giving of directions in respect of ships for purposes relating to safety or pollution and about the taking of action to enforce, in connection with, or in lieu of, directions; to make provision about fire-fighting in connection with marine incidents; and for connected purposes.
- Citation: 2003 c. 16
- Introduced by: Brian Iddon (private member's bill) (Commons)
- Territorial extent: United Kingdom, except that section 2, before it was repealed, extended only to England and Wales

Dates
- Royal assent: 10 July 2003
- Commencement: 10 September 2003

Status: Amended

Text of statute as originally enacted

Text of the Marine Safety Act 2003 as in force today (including any amendments) within the United Kingdom, from legislation.gov.uk.

The Marine Safety Act 2003 (c. 16) is an act of the Parliament of the United Kingdom.

== Legislative passage ==
The legislation was passed as a private member's bill.

== Provisions ==
The act tightened rules relating to safety at sea and marine pollution. The act requires that vessels in British waters do not pose a threat to themselves or others.

== Commencement ==
The act came into force on 10 September 2003.
