= Saving Gateway Accounts Act 2009 =

Act of the Parliament of the United Kingdom

Saving Gateway Accounts Act 2009 (Note: Section 33.)
- Act of Parliament
- Parliament of the United Kingdom
- Long title: An Act to make provision about Saving Gateway accounts; and for connected purposes.
- Citation: 2009 c. 8
- Introduced by: Alistair Darling MP, Chancellor of the Exchequer (Commons); Lord Myners (Lords)
- Territorial extent: England and Wales; Scotland; Northern Ireland; (Note: Section 32.)

Dates
- Royal assent: 2 July 2009
- Commencement: 2 July 2009 (sections 29 and 31–33); Various (rest of act); (Note: Section 31.)
- Repealed: 16 February 2011
Other legislation
Amends	Social Security Administration Act 1992; Social Security Administration (Northern Ireland) Act 1992; Northern Ireland Act 1998
Repealed by	Savings Accounts and Health in Pregnancy Grant Act 2010

Status: Repealed

History of passage through Parliament

Text of statute as originally enacted

Revised text of statute as amended

The Saving Gateway Accounts Act 2009 (c. 8) was an act of the Parliament of the United Kingdom. It made provision for saving gateway accounts.

The act was originally planned to commence in July 2010, and was aimed at encouraging the poorest to save.

== Subsequent developments ==
Following the 2010 General Election, the new Coalition government scrapped the planned introduction, with Chancellor George Osborne saying that the scheme "not affordable".

The whole act was repealed by section 2(1) of the Savings Accounts and Health in Pregnancy Grant Act 2010, which came into force on 16 February 2011.
