= Northern Ireland Act 1947 =

Act of the Parliament of the United Kingdom

Northern Ireland Act 1947 (Note: Section 15.)
- Act of Parliament
- Parliament of the United Kingdom
- Long title: An Act to enlarge the legislative power of the Parliament of Northern Ireland in respect of certain matters and, in connection therewith, to remove doubts regarding the validity of certain laws made by that Parliament; to validate the Fire Services (Emergency Provisions) Act (Northern Ireland), 1942; to apply Part III of the Requisitioned Land and War Works Act, 1945, to Northern Ireland; to extend section two of the Northern Ireland (Miscellaneous Provisions) Act, 1945; and for purposes connected with the matters aforesaid.
- Citation: 10 & 11 Geo. 6. c. 37
- Territorial extent: United Kingdom

Dates
- Royal assent: 31 July 1947
- Commencement: 31 July 1947 (in part); 1 July 1921 (section 10); (Note: Section 10(2).)

Other legislation
- Amends: Government of Ireland (Supreme Court Matters, etc.) Order 1922; Northern Ireland Land Purchase (Winding Up) Act 1935; Northern Ireland (Miscellaneous Provisions) Act 1945; Requisitioned Land and War Works Act 1945
- Amended by: Statute Law Revision Act 1953; Northern Ireland Act 1962; Northern Ireland Constitution Act 1973; Statute Law (Repeals) Act 1993; Northern Ireland Act 1998

Status: Amended

Text of statute as originally enacted

Revised text of statute as amended

Text of the Northern Ireland Act 1947 as in force today (including any amendments) within the United Kingdom, from legislation.gov.uk.

The Northern Ireland Act 1947 (10 & 11 Geo. 6. c. 37) is an act of the Parliament of the United Kingdom that aimed to enlarge the power of the Parliament of Northern Ireland.

== Subsequent developments ==
Section 13 of the act was repealed by section 1(1) of, and group 2 of part XI of schedule 1 to, the Statute Law (Repeals) Act 1993, which came into force on 5 November 1993.
