= Emergency Workers (Obstruction) Act 2006 =

Act of the Parliament of the United Kingdom

- Act of Parliament
- Parliament of the United Kingdom
- Long title: An Act to make it an offence to obstruct or hinder persons who provide emergency services; and for connected purposes.
- Citation: 2006 c. 39
- Territorial extent: England and Wales; Northern Ireland

Dates
- Royal assent: 8 November 2006
- Commencement: 20 February 2007

Status: Current legislation

History of passage through Parliament

Text of statute as originally enacted

Text of the Emergency Workers (Obstruction) Act 2006 as in force today (including any amendments) within the United Kingdom, from legislation.gov.uk.

The Emergency Services (Obstruction) Act 2006 (c. 39) is an act of the Parliament of the United Kingdom. It is intended to reduce the instances of obstruction of, or assaults on, emergency service personnel.

The act was passed as a private member's bill.

== Scope ==
The act defines emergency service personnel to cover firefighters, paramedics or other persons responding on behalf of the statutory ambulance service, members of HM Coastguard, and crew of a vessel of the RNLI or any other lifeboat.

== Offences and penalties ==
The act makes it an offence to obstruct any emergency service crew while responding to an emergency, whether physically or not, punishable by a fine of up to level 5 on the standard scale.

See R v McMenemy [2009] EWCA Crim 42, [2009] 2 Cr App R (S).
