= Northern Ireland Assembly (Elections and Periods of Suspension) Act 2003 =

Act of the Parliament of the United Kingdom

Northern Ireland Assembly (Elections and Periods of Suspension) Act 2003 (Note: Section 8(1).)
- Act of Parliament
- Parliament of the United Kingdom
- Long title: An Act to make further provision about the election of the next Northern Ireland Assembly; to make further provision about periods when section 1 of the Northern Ireland Act 2000 is in force; and for connected purposes.
- Citation: 2003 c. 12
- Introduced by: Paul Murphy (Commons)
- Territorial extent: United Kingdom

Dates
- Royal assent: 15 May 2003
- Commencement: 15 May 2003 (Note: Section 4(b) of the Interpretation Act 1978.)
Other legislation
Amends	Northern Ireland Act 1998; Northern Ireland Act 2000; Northern Ireland Assembly Elections Act 2003
Amended by	Public Services Ombudsman Act (Northern Ireland) 2016
Relates to	Northern Ireland Act 2000

Status: Amended

Text of statute as originally enacted

Revised text of statute as amended

The Northern Ireland Assembly (Elections and Periods of Suspension) Act 2003 (c. 12) is an act of the Parliament of the United Kingdom. The purpose of the act was to postpone the election of the Northern Ireland Assembly. It was passed because of the suspension of the Northern Ireland Assembly.

== Section 6 - Modification of enactments ==
The following orders were made under section 6(1):

- The Northern Ireland Assembly (Elections and Periods of Suspension) Act 2003 (Consequential Modifications) Order 2003 (SI 2003/2696)
- The Northern Ireland Assembly (Elections and Periods of Suspension) Act 2003 (Consequential Modifications No. 2) Order 2003 (SI 2003/2752)
