= Weeds Act 1959 =

Act of the Parliament of the United Kingdom

Weeds Act 1959 (Note: Section 11(1).)
- Act of Parliament
- Parliament of the United Kingdom
- Long title: An Act to consolidate certain enactments relating to injurious weeds.
- Citation: 7 & 8 Eliz. 2. c. 54
- Territorial extent: England and Wales; Scotland; (Note: Section 11(3).)

Dates
- Royal assent: 16 July 1959
- Commencement: 16 July 1959 (Note: The Acts of Parliament (Commencement) Act 1793.)
Other legislation
Amends	See § Repealed enactments
Repeals/revokes	See § Repealed enactments
Amended by	Local Government Act 1972; Statute Law (Repeals) Act 1974; Criminal Procedure (Scotland) Act 1975; Local Land Charges Act 1975; Criminal Justice Act 1982; Roads (Scotland) Act 1984; Local Government Act 1985; Local Government (Wales) Act 1994; Ragwort Control Act 2003; Statute Law (Repeals) Act 2004; Church of England (Miscellaneous Provisions) Measure 2006

Status: Amended

Text of statute as originally enacted

Text of the Weeds Act 1959 as in force today (including any amendments) within the United Kingdom, from legislation.gov.uk.

The Weeds Act 1959 (7 & 8 Eliz. 2. c. 54) is an act of the Parliament of the United Kingdom. It concerns control of some weeds which are considered harmful to agriculture. The act allows a minister to make control orders. It doesn't make controlling the plants listed compulsory. It does not prohibit anyone from growing them and it doesn't make possession of any of those plants a criminal offence.

Section 1(1) states: "Where the Minister of Agriculture, Fisheries and Food ... is satisfied that there are injurious weeds to which this Act applies growing upon any land he may serve upon the occupier of the land a notice in writing requiring him, within the time specified in the notice, to take such action as may be necessary to prevent the weeds from spreading." It received royal assent on 16 July 1959.

The act preserved powers contained in the Corn Production Acts (Repeal) Act 1921 (11 & 12 Geo. 5. c. 48), but which were originally inserted into the Corn Production Act 1917 (7 & 8 Geo. 5. c. 46) by the Agriculture Act 1920 (10 & 11 Geo. 5. c. 76).

The term "injurious" in the context of weeds means harmful to the interests of agriculture. It does not mean the weeds cause injury.

== Species referred to in the Weeds Act 1959 ==
=== Broad Leaved Dock ===
The Broad Leaved Dock is a resilient and common perennial plant found in grasslands throughout the United Kingdom. Unaffected by regular climatic variations and all but the most acidic soils, the Broad Leaved Dock can produce around 60,000 seeds a year and flowers from June to October. The seeds can survive for up to 50 years in soil due to a 'chemical that inhibits microbial decay'.

=== Curled Dock ===
The Curled Dock is found mostly in meadowland, wasteland, sand dunes, and dry soils. The Curled Dock can be annual, biennial, or perennial, and can produce 3000 to 4000 seeds per plant. Although said to contribute to animal wellbeing by providing nutrients which would otherwise be absent, it also contains oxalic acid which could be damaging to stock.

=== Creeping Thistle ===
The Creeping Thistle is a common resilient perennial plant found in grasslands throughout the United Kingdom. Characterised by spined lobed leaves, it stands up to one metre high and blooms with light purple flowers between July and September. Its root system is very deep, extending up to three metres underground and six metres sideways; as such, it is very hard to remove from an affected area. It competes fiercely with other plants or crops and can release a natural biocide into the soil to inhibit growth of other species.

=== Ragwort ===
The Common Ragwort is a biennial yellow angiosperm which can grow to 30–100 cm high. A ragwort plant can produce around 30,000 to 120,000 seeds but as this is a native plant in the UK these would on average only create one new plant. It can be toxic to livestock if it is contained in hay and it contains several kinds of Pyrrolizidine alkaloid which can, if the dose is high enough, cause liver damage.

=== Spear Thistle ===
The Spear Thistle is an annual or biennial plant which forms dark purple or reddish flowers above dark green spiked leaves. A plant found in pastoral land and along roads, it is easily spread by vehicles as they pass by.

== Provisions ==
=== Repealed enactments ===
Section 10(1) of the act repealed 4 enactments, listed in the schedule to the act.

Citation	Short title	Extent of repeal
11 & 12 Geo. 5. c. 48	Corn Production Acts (Repeal) Act 1921	The whole act.
10 & 11 Geo. 6. c. 48	Agriculture Act 1947	In section seventy-six, subsection (2).
10 & 11 Geo. 6. c. 48	Agriculture Act 1947	Section one hundred and two.
11 & 12 Geo. 6. c. 45	Agriculture (Scotland) Act 1948	Section fifty-one.
6 & 7 Eliz. 2. c. 71	Agriculture Act 1958	Section seven.
6 & 7 Eliz. 2. c. 71	Agriculture Act 1958	In the Fourth Schedule, paragraph 12 and the reference to that paragraph in paragraph 13.

== Subsequent developments ==
Section 10(1) of, and the schedule to, the act were repealed by section 1 of, and part XI of the schedule to, the Statute Law (Repeals) Act 1974, which came into force on 27 June 1974.

Section 1 of the Ragwort Control Act 2003 inserted section 1A (Code of practice: ragwort) into the act for England and Wales, which came into force on 20 February 2004.
