= Northern Ireland Constitution Act 1973 =

Act of the Parliament of the United Kingdom

Northern Ireland Constitution Act 1973 (Note: Section 43(1).)
- Act of Parliament
- Parliament of the United Kingdom
- Long title: An Act to make new provision for the government of Northern Ireland
- Citation: 1973 c. 36
- Introduced by: William Whitelaw, Northern Ireland Secretary (Commons); David Hennessy, 3rd Baron Windlesham (Lords)
- Territorial extent: United Kingdom

Dates
- Royal assent: 18 July 1973
- Commencement: 18 July 1973 (parts I, IV and V) (Note: Section 43(5).); 1 September 1973 (rest of act) (Note: The Northern Ireland Constitution Act 1973 (Commencement No. 1) Order 1973 (SI 1973/1418).)
Other legislation
| Amends | Jews Relief Act 1858; Northern Ireland Land Act 1925; Statute Law Revision Act 1927; Northern Ireland Land Purchase (Winding Up) Act 1935; Police and Firemen (War Service) Act 1939; Treason Act 1945; Atomic Energy Act 1946; Northern Ireland Act 1947; Law Reform (Personal Injuries) Act 1948; Statute Law Revision Act 1948; Prevention of Damage by Pests Act 1949; Statute Law Revision Act 1950; Defamation Act 1952; Statute Law Revision Act 1953; Therapeutic Substances Act 1956; Sexual Offences Act 1956; Recreational Charities Act 1958; Statute Law Revision Act 1958; Agricultural Marketing Act 1958; Public Records Act 1958; Variation of Trusts Act 1958; Statute Law Revision Act 1959; Statute Law Revision Act 1960; Finance Act 1963; Statute Law Revision Act 1963; Plant Varieties and Seeds Act 1964; Continental Shelf Act 1964; Statute Law Revision Act 1964; Carriage of Goods by Road Act 1965; Nuclear Installations Act 1965; Statute Law Revision Act 1966; Development of Inventions Act 1967; Provisional Collection of Taxes Act 1968; Agriculture (Miscellaneous Provisions) Act 1968; Theft Act 1968; Transport Act 1968; Statute Law (Repeals) Act 1969; Attachment of Earnings Act 1971; Misuse of Drugs Act 1971; Law Reform (Miscellaneous Provisions) Act 1971; Wild Creatures and Forest Laws Act 1971; Mineral Workings (Offshore Installations) Act 1971; Prevention of Oil Pollution Act 1971; Social Security Act 1971; Banking and Financial Dealings Act 1971; Summer Time Act 1972; Industry Act 1972; National Debt Act 1972; Supply of Goods (Implied Terms) Act 1973; Northern Ireland Assembly Act 1973; Northern Ireland (Emergency Provisions) Act 1973 |
| Amended by | Northern Ireland Constitution (Amendment) Act 1973; Northern Ireland Assembly Disqualification Act 1975; Judicature (Northern Ireland) Act 1978; British Telecommunications Act 1981; Patents, Designs and Marks Act 1986; Social Security Act 1990; Human Fertilisation and Embryology Act 1990; Child Support Act 1991; National Lottery etc. Act 1993; Pension Schemes Act 1993; Social Security Administration (Northern Ireland) Act 1992; Pension Schemes (Northern Ireland) Act 1993; Northern Ireland Act 1998; Justice (Northern Ireland) Act 2002; Law Officers Act 1997; Statute Law (Repeals) Act 1981; Parliamentary Constituencies Act 1986 |
| Relates to | House of Commons (Redistribution of Seats) Act 1979 |

Status: Amended

Text of statute as originally enacted

Revised text of statute as amended

Text of the Northern Ireland Constitution Act 1973 as in force today (including any amendments) within the United Kingdom, from legislation.gov.uk.

The Northern Ireland Constitution Act 1973 (c. 36) is an act of the Parliament of the United Kingdom which received royal assent on 18 July 1973. The act abolished the suspended Parliament of Northern Ireland and the post of Governor and made provision for a devolved administration consisting of an Executive chosen by the new Northern Ireland Assembly devised under the Sunningdale Agreement; the assembly had already been created by the Northern Ireland Assembly Act 1973, passed two months earlier.

== "Status of Northern Ireland as part of United Kingdom" ==
When the Republic of Ireland ceased to be a member of the British Commonwealth, Westminster had responded with the Ireland Act 1949 (12, 13 & 14 Geo. 6. c. 41). Amongst its other provisions, the act had guaranteed that Northern Ireland would not cease to remain a part of the United Kingdom "without the consent of the Parliament of Northern Ireland" (s. 1(2)); this declaration had proven to be controversial both with the Irish government and with Northern Ireland's nationalist community.

Since the 1973 act abolished the Parliament of Northern Ireland, it replaced the 1949 guarantee with one based on a popular vote rather than a parliamentary vote:

It is hereby declared that Northern Ireland remains part of Her Majesty's dominions and of the United Kingdom, and it is hereby affirmed that in no event will Northern Ireland or any part of it cease to be part of Her Majesty's dominions and of the United Kingdom without the consent of the majority of the people of Northern Ireland voting in a poll held for the purposes of this section in accordance with Schedule 1 to this Act. — Northern Ireland Constitution Act 1973, section 1.

A referendum on similar lines had already been held on 8 March 1973, with 98.9% of voters backing the union after a nationalist boycott of the poll. Schedule 1 of the Constitution Act provided that no further referendum was to be held before 9 March 1983. If the result of that or any future referendum meant that Northern Ireland remained part of the United Kingdom, a subsequent referendum on the issue could not be held for a further ten years.

The Northern Ireland Act 1998 replaced the 1973 referendum requirement, requiring a referendum if it "appears likely" to pass and unity negotiations if it does pass, and reducing the gap between referendums to seven years.

== Attempts to prevent discrimination ==
Part III of the act dealt with discrimination "on the ground of religious belief or political opinion." Any existing Act of the Parliament of Northern Ireland, any Measure to be passed by the new Assembly, and any secondary legislation was declared to be void if it discriminated against an individual or "class of persons" on the basis of their religious or political beliefs. It was also said to be unlawful for the Executive or a government body to "discriminate, or aid, induce or incite another to discriminate" against someone on the same grounds. Discrimination was defined as "treat[ing a] person or [a] class [of persons] less favourably in any circumstances than other persons are treated in those circumstances by the law for the time being in force in Northern Ireland."

The Standing Advisory Commission on Human Rights (SACHR) was also created.

== Replacement of the Parliament ==
The Parliament of Northern Ireland, which had been indefinitely suspended on 30 March 1972 by the Northern Ireland (Temporary Provisions) Act 1972, was now permanently abolished. Its staff were transferred to work for the new assembly. The new assembly was meant to be a power-sharing institution.

The office of Governor of Northern Ireland was also abolished. Unlike the position with the parliament, his duties were not transferred to a new role but were mainly absorbed by the Secretary of State for Northern Ireland. Responsibility for appointing (or removing) the Director of Public Prosecutions for Northern Ireland was given to the Attorney General for Northern Ireland (which became attached to that of the Attorney General for England and Wales).

The new Assembly was able to pass "measures", which had the "same force and effect" as acts of the Westminster Parliament.

== Devolution ==
Devolution was only to come into effect if an executive (government) could be formed that had the support of the assembly and that was "likely to be widely accepted throughout the community". The act listed excepted matters and reserved matters; the former were areas in which the assembly was not permitted to legislate; the latter were areas which the Secretary of State for Northern Ireland could transfer into the assembly's power when and if he saw fit.

=== Excepted matters ===
- the monarchy
- the Westminster parliament
- international relations (other than dealings with the Republic of Ireland in a limited set of fields)
- certain topics covered by the European Communities Act
- the armed forces
- dignities and titles of honour
- treason and treason felony
- nationality and immigration
- pre-existing taxes
- the appointment or removal of judges
- elections
- coinage and banknotes
- the National Savings Bank
- extraordinary powers for dealing with terrorism or "subversion"

=== The executive ===
The Northern Ireland Executive was to be headed by a chief executive and was to include a maximum of eleven other members (including the heads of the various government departments). The chief executive was also to be ex officio "Leader of the Assembly".

New members of the executive were also required to take an oath (or make an affirmation):

I swear by Almighty God [or I affirm] that I will uphold the laws of Northern Ireland and conscientiously fulfil as a member of the Northern Ireland Executive my duties under the Northern Ireland Constitution Act 1973 in the interests of Northern Ireland and its people.

== Short title, commencement and extent ==
Section 43(1) of the act provided that the act may be cited as the "Northern Ireland Constitution Act 1973".

Section 43(5) of the act provided that parts I, IV and V of the act would come into force at the passing of the act.

Section 43(6) of the act provided that part III of the act would come into force on a day appointed by the secretary of state for Northern Ireland by statutory instrument.

Northern Ireland Constitution Act 1973 (Commencement No. 1) Order 1973
- Statutory Instrument
- Parliament of the United Kingdom
- Citation: SI 1973/1418
- Introduced by: William Whitelaw MP (Commons)

Dates
- Made: 8 August 1973
- Commencement: 1 September 1973 (Note: Section 2.)
Other legislation
| Made under | Northern Ireland Constitution Act 1973 |

Status: Current legislation

Text of statute as originally enacted

The Northern Ireland Constitution Act 1973 (Commencement No. 1) Order 1973 (SI 1973/1418) provided that part III of the act would come into force on 1 September 1973.
