= Industry and Exports (Financial Support) Act 2009 =

Act of the Parliament of the United Kingdom

Industry and Exports (Financial Support) Act 2009 (Note: Section 3(3).)
- Act of Parliament
- Parliament of the United Kingdom
- Long title: An Act to amend section 8(5) of the Industrial Development Act 1982 and to amend section 1(1) of the Export and Investment Guarantees Act 1991.
- Citation: 2009 c. 5
- Introduced by: Pat McFadden MP, Minister of State, Department for Business, Enterprise & Regulatory Reform (Commons); Peter Mandelson (Lords)
- Territorial extent: United Kingdom (Note: Section 3(1).)

Dates
- Royal assent: 21 May 2009
- Commencement: 21 May 2009 (Note: Section 3(2).)
Other legislation
Amends	Industrial Development Act 1982; Export and Investment Guarantees Act 1991

Status: Current legislation

History of passage through Parliament

Text of statute as originally enacted

Text of the Industry and Exports (Financial Support) Act 2009 as in force today (including any amendments) within the United Kingdom, from legislation.gov.uk.

The Industry and Exports (Financial Support) Act 2009 (c. 5) is an act of the Parliament of the United Kingdom. It was enacted in response to the "global downturn".

== Legislative passage ==
The act was passed through emergency procedure.

== Provisions ==
The act amended the Export and Investment Guarantees Act 1991 to require that exporting companies can apply to the Export Credits Guarantee Department for insurance after they have started constructing overseas projects. The amendments allowed companies to circumvent the department's commitments to human rights, the environment and sustainable development safeguards.

== Reception ==
The Conservative spokesperson criticised for not being the "practical aid", that in his view, businesses were seeking.

Nicholas Hildyard of the Corner House criticised the legislation for weakening the UK Government’s commitment to human rights.

== Bibliography ==
- "Industry and Exports (Financial Support) Act 2009". Current Law Statutes Annotated 2009. Sweet & Maxwell. Thomson Reuters. 2010. Volume 1. Chapter 5. pp 5-1 and 5-2.
