= Northern Ireland Act 1998 =

Act of the Parliament of the United Kingdom

Northern Ireland Act 1998 (Note: Section 101(1).)
- Act of Parliament
- Parliament of the United Kingdom
- Long title: An Act to make new provision for the government of Northern Ireland for the purpose of implementing the agreement reached at multi-party talks on Northern Ireland set out in Command Paper 3883.
- Citation: 1998 c. 47
- Introduced by: Mo Mowlam MP, Secretary of State for Northern Ireland (Commons); Lord Dubs, Parliamentary Under-Secretary of State for Northern Ireland (Lords)
- Territorial extent: United Kingdom

Dates
- Royal assent: 19 November 1998
- Commencement: Various (Note: Section 101(2)–(3).)
Other legislation
Amends	Act of Settlement 1701; Northern Ireland Act 1947; Public Works Loans Act 1952; House of Commons Disqualification Act 1975; Parliamentary Constituencies Act 1986; Official Secrets Act 1989; Human Fertilisation and Embryology Act 1990; Social Security Administration Act 1992; Social Security Contributions and Benefits (Northern Ireland) Act 1992; Social Security Administration (Northern Ireland) Act 1992; Criminal Justice Act 1993; Pension Schemes (Northern Ireland) Act 1993; Jobseekers Act 1995
Repeals/revokes	Northern Ireland (Temporary Provisions) Act 1972; Northern Ireland Assembly Act 1973; Northern Ireland Act 1982
Amended by	Social Security Contributions (Transfer of Functions, etc. ) Act 1999; Regulation of Investigatory Powers Act 2000; Disqualifications Act 2000; Northern Ireland Act 2000; Police (Northern Ireland) Act 2000; Postal Services Act 2000; Elections Act 2001; Political Parties, Elections and Referendums Act 2000; House of Commons (Removal of Clergy Disqualification) Act 2001; Electoral Fraud (Northern Ireland) Act 2002; Justice (Northern Ireland) Act 2002; Tax Credits Act 2002; Northern Ireland Assembly Elections Act 2003; Northern Ireland Assembly (Elections and Periods of Suspension) Act 2003; Northern Ireland (Monitoring Commission etc.) Act 2003; Child Trust Funds Act 2004; Civil Contingencies Act 2004; Statute Law (Repeals) Act 2004; Constitutional Reform Act 2005; Northern Ireland Act 2006; Government of Wales Act 2006; Northern Ireland (Miscellaneous Provisions) Act 2006; Northern Ireland (St Andrews Agreement) Act 2006; Justice and Security (Northern Ireland) Act 2007; Serious Crime Act 2007; Health and Social Care Act 2008; Northern Ireland Act 2009; Saving Gateway Accounts Act 2009; Savings Accounts and Health in Pregnancy Grant Act 2010; Northern Ireland Assembly Members Act 2010; Postal Services Act 2011; Small Charitable Donations Act 2012; Antarctic Act 2013; Crime and Courts Act 2013; Justice and Security Act 2013; Mental Health (Discrimination) Act 2013; Childcare Payments Act 2014; Immigration Act 2014; Northern Ireland (Miscellaneous Provisions) Act 2014; Assembly Members (Reduction of Numbers) Act (Northern Ireland) 2016; Investigatory Powers Act 2016; Northern Ireland (Stormont Agreement and Implementation Plan) Act 2016; Public Services Ombudsman Act (Northern Ireland) 2016; Higher Education and Research Act 2017; Savings (Government Contributions) Act 2017; European Union (Withdrawal) Act 2018; European Union (Withdrawal Agreement) Act 2020; Executive Committee (Functions) Act (Northern Ireland) 2020; Parliamentary Constituencies Act 2020; United Kingdom Internal Market Act 2020; European Union (Future Relationship) Act 2020; Elections Act 2022; Identity and Language (Northern Ireland) Act 2022; Northern Ireland (Ministers, Elections and Petitions of Concern) Act 2022; Northern Ireland (Interim Arrangements) Act 2023; Northern Ireland Troubles (Legacy and Reconciliation) Act 2023; Retained EU Law (Revocation and Reform) Act 2023
Relates to	Government of Wales Act 1998; Scotland Act 1998

Status: Amended

Text of statute as originally enacted

Revised text of statute as amended

The Northern Ireland Act 1998 (c. 47) is an act of the Parliament of the United Kingdom which allowed Westminster to devolve power to Northern Ireland, after decades of direct rule. The act translated the 1998 multi-party agreement into law.

== Provisions ==
The act states that "Northern Ireland in its entirety remains part of the United Kingdom" and that this "shall not cease to be so without the consent of a majority of the people of Northern Ireland" voting in a dedicated border poll.

It renamed the New Northern Ireland Assembly, established by the Northern Ireland (Elections) Act 1998, to the Northern Ireland Assembly.

It repealed parts of the Government of Ireland Act 1920 (10 & 11 Geo. 5. c. 67) and Northern Ireland Constitution Act 1973, and established new rules in line with the European Union and the Northern Ireland peace process, subsequent to the Belfast Agreement of 1998.

The act allowed for a devolved Northern Ireland Assembly of 108 members. Membership of the assembly is subject to a pledge of office, which subjects the member to certain requirements with regard to standards and responsibilities. Northern Ireland remains a part of the United Kingdom until or unless a majority vote in a referendum determines otherwise. The Secretary of State for Northern Ireland holds the power to call for the referendum if it appears likely to them that a majority of the voters would express their desire to become part of a United Ireland. The assembly has the power of modifying any act of the British Parliament as far as it "is part of the law of Northern Ireland".

The act contains three categories of matters:

- transferred matters, which are the responsibilities of the Northern Ireland Assembly.
- reserved maters, which remain the responsibility of Westminster, but can be transferred in the future.
- excepted matters, which remain the responsibility of Westminster, but cannot be transferred.

When exercising functions relating to reserved or excepted matters, the UK government may be obliged to consult the Republic of Ireland through the British-Irish Intergovernmental Conference. The Assembly has been suspended a number of times since 1998, and was re-established on Tuesday 8 May 2007, subsequent to the St Andrews Agreement of 2006.

Election to the assembly is by single transferable vote (STV), a form of proportional representation.

Section 75 of the act placed an obligation on statutory agencies to consult with specific minority groups, on every aspect of public policy. The listed of groups under the section 75 of the act does not include veterans.

== See also ==
- Belfast Agreement
- Cross-community vote
- Ireland Act 1949
