= Private members' bills in the Parliament of the United Kingdom =

A Private Members' bill (PMB) in the Parliament of the United Kingdom is a type of public bill that can be introduced by either members of the House of Commons or House of Lords who are not ministers. Less parliamentary time is given to such bills and as a result only a minority of PMBs actually become law. Such bills can be used however to create publicity for a cause or issue and can affect legislation indirectly. Under section 14(8) of the Standing Orders, Priority is given in thirteen Fridays in each session, with the exact Fridays appointed by the House.

== Methods ==
There are three methods by which a Member of Parliament can introduce a Private Members' bill: by ballot, by the Ten Minute Rule, and by presentation.

=== Ballot ===
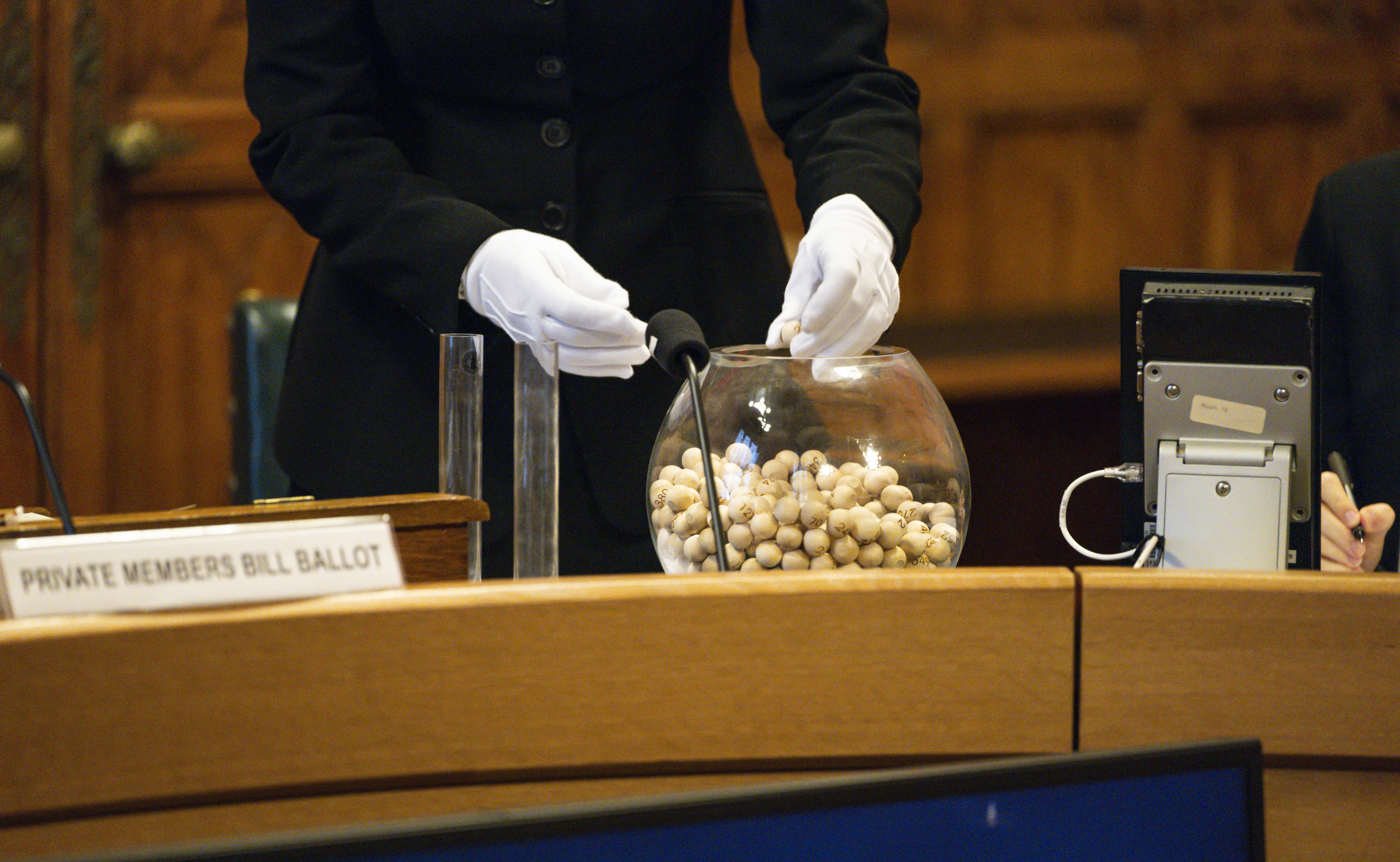
2024 Private Members Bill Ballot being drawn

Under this method Members who apply are drawn from a ballot and, if successful, are given parliamentary time for their bill. Members of Parliament who are successful in the ballot often have a higher chance of seeing their legislation passed, as greater parliamentary time is given to ballots than other methods of passing a PMB such as under the Ten Minute Rule. It is normal for the first seven ballot bills to get one day's debate each.

Members drawn in the ballot for 2025-26 were:

1. Sir Desmond Swayne, New Forest West (Conservative)
2. Lauren Edwards, Rochester and Strood (Labour)
3. Mike Wood, Kingswinford and South Staffordshire (Conservative)
4. Andrew George, St Ives (Liberal Democrat)
5. Dr Luke Evans, Hinckley and Bosworth (Conservative)
6. Sir John Whittingdale, Molden (Conservative)
7. Jessica Toale, Bournemouth West (Labour)
8. Dr Neil Shastri-Hurst, Solihull West and Shirley (Conservative)
9. Gareth Snell, Stoke-on-Trent Central(Labour)
10. Lincoln Jopp, Spelthorne (Conservative)
11. Patricia Ferguson, Glasgow West (Labour)
12. Robert Jenrick, Newark (Reform UK)
13. Damian Hinds, East Hampshire (Conservative)
14. Alistair Strathern, Hitchin (Labour)
15. Clive Jones, Wokingham (Liberal Democrat)
16. Victoria Atkins, Louth and Horncastle (Conservative)
17. Munira Wilson, Twickenham (Liberal Democrat)
18. Steff Aquarone, North Norfolk (Liberal Democrat)
19. Mr Paul Foster, South Ribble (Labour)
20. David Pinto-Duschinsky, Hendon (Labour)

=== Ten Minute Rule ===
The Ten Minute Rule is a method of introducing a PMB after a brief debate. A member speaks for up to ten minutes on a motion under Standing Order 23 to introduce a bill, followed potentially by an opposing member's ten minute speech. If the motion is passed, the bill is introduced and given a formal first reading; it is unlikely to make further progress because it will not be given priority on the parliamentary calendar. The Ten Minute Rule can be used to generate publicity for a particular issue. Often they are used merely as an opportunity to criticise legislation rather than pass a bill.

=== Presentation ===
Under section 57 of the Standing Orders, any Member of Parliament may introduce a PMB if they have previously given an indication that they intend to do so. Members then formally introduce the bill but do not speak to support it. It is rare for a PMB to succeed by this method.

=== Procedure ===
The second reading and subsequent readings of Private Members' bills take place on a sitting Friday. The sitting times for debate are 9.30am until 2.30pm; the debates for each bill must be concluded before 2.30pm in order to progress to the next stage of the bill passage. If the debate has not concluded before the time has run out, it will be moved to the bottom of the list of bills to be read and rescheduled for another time. For any sitting Friday there can be as many as 50 bills scheduled for debate on the order paper, however due to the short amount of time allotted to Friday sittings, Parliament has never progressed further than the fourth bill listed on the order of business for the day.

== Criticisms ==
The current system of Private Members' bills has been criticised for being easily susceptible to filibustering. Kerry McCarthy, a Labour MP, has compared the system to the BBC radio game show Just a Minute but in reverse, stating that the more hesitation, deviation and repetition an MP makes the more likely they are to defeat a bill. As private members' bills are debated on Fridays, attendance in debates is often poor because many Members of Parliament will have returned to their constituencies.

=== Reform proposals ===
The low number of private members' bills passed has resulted in calls for reform of the PMB system. The Hansard Society has produced reform proposals in a pamphlet called 'Enhancing the Role of Backbench MPs'. The pamphlet calls for greater resourcing of PMBs and changes to the times when private members' bills are debated.

== Recent successful private members' bills ==
The following acts of Parliament were private members' bills that successfully completed their passage through Parliament and became law.

=== 1980s ===
1983–84 parliamentary session
Type	Title of act	Citation	Presented by	Party	Constituency
Lords	Lotteries (Amendment) Act 1984	c. 9	Lord Irving of Dartford	Labour	–
Lords	Education (Amendment) (Scotland) Act 1984	c. 6	Earl of Caithness	Conservative	–
Ballot 1	Video Recordings Act 1984	c. 39	Graham Bright	Conservative	Luton South
Ballot 9	Trade Marks (Amendment) Act 1984	c. 19	Stephen Dorrell	Conservative	Charnwood
Ballot 20	Road Traffic (Driving Instruction) Act 1984	c. 13	Elizabeth Peacock	Conservative	Batley & Spen
Ballot 4	Prescription and Limitation (Scotland) Act 1984	c. 45	Alex Eadie	Labour	Midlothian
Ballot 8	Juries (Disqualification) Act 1984	c. 34	John Watson	Conservative	Skipton & Ripon
Ballot 16	Cycle Tracks Act 1984	c. 38	Cecil Franks	Conservative	Barrow & Furness
Ballot 13	Child Abduction Act 1984	c. 37	Timothy Wood	Conservative	Stevenage
Ballot 15	Betting, Gaming and Lotteries (Amendment) Act 1984	c. 25	Ian Gilmour	Conservative	Chesham & Amersham
Ballot 18	Anatomy Act 1984	c. 14	John McWilliam	Labour	Blaydon
Ballot 14	Agriculture (Amendment) Act 1984	c. 20	Edward Leigh	Conservative	Gainsborough & Horncastle
Presentation	Law Reform (Husband and Wife) (Scotland) Act 1984	c. 15	Lord James Douglas-Hamilton	Conservative	Edinburgh West

1984–85 parliamentary session
Type	Title of act	Presented by	Party	Constituency
Lords	Licensing (Amendment) Act 1985	Lord Harmar-Nicholls	Conservative	–
Lords	Dangerous Vessels Act 1985	Lord Walston	Social Democratic Party	–
Lords	Charities Act 1985	Viscount Colville of Culross	Crossbench	–
Lords	Betting, Gaming and Lotteries (Amendment) Act 1985	Lord Newall	Conservative	–
Ballot 4	Wildlife and Countryside (Amendment) Act 1985	Dr David Clark	Labour	South Shields
Ballot 2	Sexual Offences Act 1985	Janet Fookes	Conservative	Plymouth Drake
Ballot 20	Road Traffic (Production of Documents) Act 1985	Timothy Smith	Conservative	Beaconsfield
Ballot 15	Motor-Cycle Crash Helmets (Restriction of Liability) Act 1985	Ivor Stanbrook	Conservative	Orpington
Ballot 3	Local Government (Access to Information) Act 1985	Robin Squire	Conservative	Hornchurch
Ballot 1	Intoxicating Substances (Supply) Act 1985	Neville Trotter	Conservative	Tynemouth
Ballot 12	Hospital Complaints Procedure Act 1985	Michael McNair-Wilson	Conservative	Newbury
Ballot 19	Gaming (Bingo) Act 1985	Peter Fry	Conservative	Wellingborough
Ballot 6	Copyright (Computer Software) Amendment Act 1985	William Powell	Conservative	Corby
Ballot 13	Controlled Drugs (Penalties) Act 1985	Keith Raffan	Conservative	Delyn
Ballot 11	Charter Trustees Act 1985	Charles Morrison	Conservative	Devizes
10 minute rule	Town and Country Planning (Amendment) Act 1985	Roger Freeman	Conservative	Kettering
10 minute rule	Rent (Amendment) Act 1985	Michael Mates	Conservative	East Hampshire
Presentation	Wildlife and Countryside (Service of Notices) Act 1985	Dr David Clark	Labour	South Shields
Presentation	Prohibition of Female Circumcision Act 1985	Marion Roe	Conservative	Broxbourne
Presentation	Hill Farming Act 1985	Robert Jackson	Labour	Wantage
Presentation	Agricultural Training Board Act 1985	Tom Torney	Labour	Bradford South

1985–86 parliamentary session
Type	Title of act	Presented by	Party	Constituency
Lords	Prevention of Oil Pollution Act 1986	Lord Walston	Social Democratic Party	–
Lords	Marriage (Prohibited Degrees of Relationship) Act 1986	Lord Meston	Crossbench	–
Lords	Incest and Related Offences (Scotland) Act 1986	Lord Wilson of Langside	Crossbench	–
Ballot 4	Safety at Sea Act 1986	Albert McQuarrie	Conservative	Banff & Buchan
Ballot 14	Road Traffic Regulation (Parking) Act 1986	Kevin McNamara	Labour	Kingston upon Hull North
Ballot 11	Protection of Military Remains Act 1986	Michael Mates	Conservative	East Hampshire
Ballot 18	Industrial Training Act 1986	William Clark	Conservative	Croydon South
Ballot 16	Horticultural Produce Act 1986	John Wells	Conservative	Maidstone
Ballot 15	Drainage Rates (Disabled Persons) Act 1986	Gerard Vaughan	Conservative	Reading East
Ballot 1	Disabled Persons (Services, Consultation and Representation) Act 1986	Tom Clarke	Labour	Coatbridge, Chryston and Bellshill
Ballot 19	Corneal Tissue Act 1986	John Hannam	Conservative	Exeter
Ballot 20	Consumer Safety (Amendment) Act 1986	Conal Gregory	Conservative	York
Ballot 6	Civil Protection in Peacetime Act 1986	Nicholas Bonsor	Conservative	Upminster
Ballot 3	Children and Young Persons (Amendment) Act 1986	Dennis Walters	Conservative	Westbury
Presentation	Protection of Children (Tobacco) Act 1986	John Home Robertson	Labour	East Lothian
Presentation	Marriage (Wales) Act 1986	Donald Coleman	Labour	Neath
Presentation	Law Reform (Parent and Child) (Scotland) Act 1986	Lord James Douglas-Hamilton	Conservative	Edinburgh West
Presentation	Highways (Amendment) Act 1986	Michael Cocks	Labour	Bristol South
Presentation	Health Service Joint Consultative Committees (Access to Information) Act 1986	Dr Brian Mawhinney	Conservative	Peterborough
Presentation	Gaming (Amendment) Act 1986	Mark Carlisle	Conservative	Warrington South
Presentation	Forestry Act 1986	John Stradling Thomas	Conservative	Monmouth

1986–87 parliamentary session
Type	Title of act	Presented by	Party	Constituency
Lords	Licensing (Restaurant Meals) Act 1987	Viscount Montgomery of Alamein	Crossbench	–
Lords	Gaming (Amendment) Act 1987	Lord Harris of Greenwich	Liberal Democrat	–
Lords	Billiards (Abolition of Restrictions) Act 1987	Lord Allen of Abbeydale	Crossbench	–
Lords	Animals (Scotland) Act 1987	Earl of Selkirk	Conservative	–
Ballot 17	Motorcycle Noise Act 1987	Robert Adley	Conservative	Christchurch
Ballot 4	Crown Proceedings (Armed Forces) Act 1987	Winston Churchill	Conservative	Davyhulme
Ballot 3	Crossbows Act 1987	Peter Bruinvels	Conservative	Leicester East
Ballot 7	AIDS Control Act 1987	Gavin Strang	Labour	Edinburgh East
Ballot 2	Agricultural Training Board Act 1987	Gerrard Neale	Conservative	North Cornwall
Ballot 6	Access to Personal Files Act 1987	Archy Kirkwood	Liberal Democrat	Roxburgh & Berwickshire
Presentation	Registered Establishments (Scotland) Act 1987	Albert McQuarrie	Conservative	Banff & Buchan
Presentation	Register of Sasines (Scotland) Act 1987	Michael Martin	Labour	Glasgow Springburn
Presentation	Protection of Animals (Penalties) Act 1987	Harry Greenway	Conservative	Ealing North
Presentation	Prescription (Scotland) Act 1987	Michael Hirst	Conservative	Strathkelvin & Bearsden
Presentation	Deer Act 1987	David Knox	Conservative	Staffordshire Moorlands

1987–88 parliamentary session
Type	Title of act	Presented by	Party	Constituency
Lords	Land Registration Act 1988	Lord Templeman	Crossbench	–
Lords	Landlord and Tenant Act 1988	Lord Coleraine	Conservative	–
Ballot 2	Scotch Whisky Act 1988	Bill Walker	Conservative	North Tayside
Ballot 12	Protection of Animals (Amendment) Act 1988	John Browne	Independent Conservative	Winchester
Ballot 5	Motor Vehicles (Wearing of Rear Seat Belts by Children) Act 1988	Stephen Day	Conservative	Cheadle
Ballot 6	Malicious Communications Act 1988	Andy Stewart	Conservative	Sherwood
Ballot 13	Licensing (Retail Sales) Act 1988	Andrew MacKay	Conservative	Bracknell
Ballot 9	Environment and Safety Information Act 1988	Chris Smith	Labour	Islington South & Finsbury
Ballot 4	Consumer Arbitration Agreements Act 1988	James Pawsey	Conservative	Rugby & Kenilworth
Ballot 19	Community Health Councils (Access to Information) Act 1988	Andrew Faulds	Labour	Warley East
Ballot 10	Access to Medical Reports Act 1988	Archy Kirkwood	Liberal Democrat	Roxburgh & Berwickshire
Presentation	Solicitors (Scotland) Act 1988	Alistair Darling	Conservative	Edinburgh Central
Presentation	Protection Against Cruel Tethering Act 1988	David Amess	Conservative	Basildon

1988–89 parliamentary session
Type	Title of act	Presented by	Party	Constituency
Lords	Licensing (Amendment) Act 1989	Lord Brooks of Tremorfa	Labour	–
Ballot 18	Parking Act 1989	Timothy Kirkhope	Conservative	Leeds North East
Ballot 19	International Parliamentary Organisations (Registration) Act 1989	Michael Marshall	Conservative	Arundel
Ballot 9	Hearing Aid Council (Amendment) Act 1989	Ieuan Wyn Jones	Plaid Cymru	Ynys Môn
Ballot 11	Disabled Persons (Northern Ireland) Act 1989	Rev Martin Smyth	Ulster Unionist Party	Belfast South
Ballot 16	Control of Smoke Pollution Act 1989	Andrew Hunter	Democratic Unionist Party	Basingstoke
Ballot 5	Control of Pollution (Amendment) Act 1989	Joan Ruddock	Labour	Lewisham Deptford
Presentation	Dangerous Dogs Act 1989	Dame Janet Fookes	Conservative	Plymouth Drake
	Common Land (Rectification of Registers) Act 1989	Anthony Favell	Conservative	Stockport

1989–90 parliamentary session
Type	Title of act	Presented by	Party	Constituency
Lords	Gaming (Amendment) Act 1990	Lord Allen of Abbeydale	Crossbench	–
Ballot 5	Rights of Way Act 1990	Edward Leigh	Conservative	Gainsborough & Horncastle
Ballot 12	Representation of the People Act 1990	Anthony Beaumont-Dark	Conservative	Birmingham, Selly Oak
Ballot 19	Marriage (Registration of Buildings) Act 1990	George Walden	Conservative	Buckingham
Ballot 16	Licensing (Low Alcohol Drinks) Act 1990	Peter Emery	Conservative	Honiton
Ballot 7	Entertainments (Increased Penalties) Act 1990	Graham Bright	Conservative	Luton South
Ballot 3	Computer Misuse Act 1990	Michael Colvin	Conservative	Romsey
Ballot 18	Agricultural Holdings (Amendment) Act 1990	Alex Carlile	Liberal Democrat	Montgomery
Ballot 13	Access to Health Records Act 1990	Doug Henderson	Labour	Newcastle upon Tyne North
Presentation	Term and Quarter Days (Scotland) Act 1990	Bill Walker	Conservative	North Tayside
Presentation	Horses (Protective Headgear for Young Riders) Act 1990	Harry Greenway	Conservative	Ealing North

=== 1990s ===
1990–91 parliamentary session
Type	Title of act	Presented by	Party	Constituency
Lords	Medical Qualifications (Amendment) Act 1991	Lord McColl of Dulwich	Conservative	–
Ballot 18	Wildlife and Countryside (Amendment) Act 1991	Donald Coleman	Labour	Neath
Ballot 13	Road Traffic (Temporary Restrictions) Act 1991	William Cash	Conservative	Stafford
Ballot 10	Registered Homes (Amendment) Act 1991	John Butterfill	Conservative	Bournemouth West
Ballot 9	Radioactive Material (Road Transport) Act 1991	Dudley Fishburn	Conservative	Kensington
Ballot 7	Property Misdescriptions Act 1991	John Butcher	Conservative	Coventry South West
Ballot 16	Motor Vehicles (Safety Equipment for Children) Act 1991	Michael Jopling	Conservative	Westmorland & Lonsdale
Ballot 14	Local Government Finance (Publicity for Auditors' Reports) Act 1991	Michael Mates	Conservative	East Hampshire
Ballot 12	Crofter Forestry (Scotland) Act 1991	Calum Macdonald	Labour	Western Isles
Ballot 17	Criminal Procedure (Insanity and Unfitness to Plead) Act 1991	John Greenway	Conservative	Ryedale
Ballot 1	Children and Young Persons (Protection from Tobacco) Act 1991	Andrew Faulds	Labour	Warley East
Ballot 5	Badgers Act 1991	Roy Hughes	Labour	Newport East
Presentation	Welfare of Animals at Slaughter Act 1991	Richard Body	Conservative	Boston & Skegness
Presentation	Smoke Detectors Act 1991	Conal Gregory	Conservative	York
Presentation	Mental Health Detention (Scotland) Act 1991	Russell Johnston	Liberal Democrat	Inverness, Nairn & Lochaber
Presentation	Forestry Act 1991	Hector Monro	Conservative	Dumfries
Presentation	Football (Offences) Act 1991	John Wheeler	Conservative	Westminster North
Presentation	Breeding of Dogs Act 1991	Alan Williams	Labour	Swansea West
Presentation	Badgers (Further Protection) Act 1991	Alan Meale	Labour	Mansfield
Presentation	Age of Legal Capacity (Scotland) Act 1991	Nicholas Fairbairn	Conservative	Perth & Kinross

1991–92 parliamentary session
Type	Title of act	Presented by	Party	Constituency
Lords	Offshore Safety (Protection Against Victimisation) Act 1992	Baroness Turner of Camden	Labour	–
Lords	Bingo Act 1992	Lord Harmar-Nicholls	Conservative	–
Lords	Access to Neighbouring Land Act 1992	Lord Murton of Lindisfarne	Conservative	–
Ballot 2	Traffic Calming Act 1992	Keith Mans	Conservative	Wyre
Ballot 13	Tourism (Overseas Promotion) (Wales) Act 1992	Keith Raffan	Conservative	Delyn
Ballot 4	Timeshare Act 1992	Andrew Hunter	Democratic Unionist Party	Basingstoke
Ballot 10	Still-Birth (Definition) Act 1992	Rosie Barnes	Independent SDP	Greenwich
Ballot 15	Sexual Offences (Amendment) Act 1992	Martin Brandon-Bravo	Conservative	Nottingham South
Ballot 19	Sea Fisheries (Wildlife Conservation) Act 1992	Hon Philip Oppenheim	Conservative	Amber Valley
Ballot 3	Medicinal Products: Prescription by Nurses etc. Act 1992	Roger Sims	Conservative	Chislehurst
Ballot 17	Firearms (Amendment) Act 1992	Michael Lord	Conservative	Central Suffolk
Presentation	Licensing (Amendment) (Scotland) Act 1992	Bill Walker	Conservative	North Tayside
Presentation	Cheques Act 1992	Conal Gregory	Conservative	York

1992–93 parliamentary session
Type	Title of act	Presented by	Party	Constituency
Lords	Video Recordings Act 1993	Lord Birkett	Crossbench	–
Lords	Sporting Events (Control of Alcohol etc.) (Amendment) Act 1992	Lord Dormand of Easington	Labour	–
Lords	Gas (Exempt Supplies) Act 1993	Lord Cochrane of Cults	Conservative	–
Lords	Damages (Scotland) (No 2) Act 1993	Lord Macaulay of Bragar	Non-affiliated	–
Lords	Carriage of Goods by Sea Act 1993	Lord Goff of Chieveley	Crossbench	–
Ballot 11	Sexual Offences Act 1993	Jerry Hayes	Conservative	Harlow
Ballot 8	Road Traffic (Driving Instruction by Disabled Persons) Act 1993	John Hannam	Conservative	Exeter
Ballot 2	Osteopaths Act 1993	Malcolm Moss	Conservative	North East Cambridgeshire
Ballot 10	Noise and Statutory Nuisance Act 1993	Andrew Hunter	Democratic Unionist Party	Basingstoke
Ballot 18	Merchant Shipping (Registration etc.) Act 1993	Richard Page	Conservative	South West Hertfordshire
Ballot 1	Local Government (Overseas Assistance) Act 1993	James Lester	Conservative	Broxtowe
10 minute rule	Local Government (Amendment) Act 1993	Neil Gerrard	Labour	Walthamstow
Presentation	Protection of Animals (Scotland) Act 1993	Bill Walker	Conservative	North Tayside
Presentation	Licensing (Amendment) (Scotland) Act 1993	Phil Gallie	Conservative	Ayr
Presentation	Carrying of Knives etc. (Scotland) Act 1993	Phil Gallie	Conservative	Ayr

1993–94 parliamentary session
Type	Title of act	Presented by	Party	Constituency
Lords	State Hospitals (Scotland) Act 1994	Marquess of Huntly	Conservative	–
Lords	Sale of Goods (Amendment) Act 1994	Lord Renton	Conservative	–
Lords	New Towns (Amendment) Act 1994	Lords Finsberg	Conservative	–
Lords	Mental Health (Amendment) Act 1994	Lord Jenkin of Roding	Conservative	–
Lords	Land Drainage Act 1994	Earl of Lindsay	Conservative	–
Lords	Inshore Fishing (Scotland) Act 1994	Lord Campbell of Croy	Conservative	–
Ballot 13	Sale and Supply of Goods Act 1994	David Clelland	Labour	Tyne Bridge
Ballot 6	Road Traffic Regulation (Special Events) Act 1994	Peter Atkinson	Conservative	Hexham
Ballot 11	Race Relations (Remedies) Act 1994	Keith Vaz	Labour	Leicester East
Ballot 12	Parliamentary Commissioner Act 1994	Gerald Malone	Conservative	Winchester
Ballot 15	Merchant Shipping (Salvage and Pollution) Act 1994	David Harris	Conservative	St Ives
Ballot 16	Insolvency (No. 2) Act 1994	John Butterfill	Conservative	Bournemouth West
Ballot 4	Chiropractors Act 1994	David Lidington	Conservative	Aylesbury
Ballot 5	Antarctic Act 1994	Michael Jopling	Conservative	Westmorland & Lonsdale
Presentation	Marriage Act 1994	Gyles Brandreth	Conservative	City of Chester
Presentation	Firearms (Amendment) Act 1994	Michael Shersby	Conservative	Uxbridge

1994–95 parliamentary session
Type	Title of act	Presented by	Party	Constituency
Lords	Sale of Goods (Amendment) Act 1994	Lord Mustill	Crossbench	–
Lords	Requirements of Writing (Scotland) Act 1995	Earl of Balfour	Conservative	–
Lords	Geneva Conventions (Amendment) Act 1995	Lord Archer of Weston-Super-Mare	Non-affiliated	–
Lords	Civil Evidence (Family Mediation) (Scotland) Act 1995	Baroness Carnegy of Lour	Other	–
Ballot 11	Road Traffic (New Drivers) Act 1995	Dr Michael Clark	Conservative	Rayleigh
Ballot 3	Proceeds of Crime Act 1995	John Hannam	Conservative	Exeter
Ballot 17	Prisoners (Return to Custody) Act 1995	Lady Olga Maitland	Conservative	Sutton & Cheam
Ballot 13	Olympic Symbol etc. (Protection) Act 1995	Nicholas Winterton	Conservative	Macclesfield
Ballot 9	Insurance Companies (Reserves) Act 1995	Oliver Heald	Conservative	North Hertfordshire
Ballot 1	Home Energy Conservation Act 1995	Diana Maddock	Liberal Democrat	Christchurch
Ballot 18	Charities (Amendment) Act 1995	Ray Whitney	Conservative	Wycombe
Ballot 10	Carers (Recognition and Services) Act 1995	Malcolm Wicks	Labour	Croydon North
Ballot 2	Activity Centres (Young Persons' Safety) Act 1995	David Jamieson	Labour	Plymouth, Devonport
10 minute rule	Landlord and Tenant (Covenants) Act 1995	Peter Thurnham	Liberal Democrat	Bolton North East
10 minute rule	Land Registers (Scotland) Act 1995	Bill Walker	Conservative	North Tayside
10 minute rule	Building Societies (Joint Account Holders) Act 1995	Douglas French	Conservative	Gloucester
Presentation	National Health Service (Amendment) Act 1995	John Austin	Labour	Woolwich

1995–96 parliamentary session
Type	Title of act	Presented by	Party	Constituency
Lords	Party Wall etc. Act 1996	Earl of Lytton	Crossbench	–
Lords	Hong Kong (War Wives and Widows) Act 1996	Lord Willoughby de Broke	Other	–
Lords	Civil Aviation (Amendment) Act 1996	Lord Brabazon of Tara	Conservative	–
Ballot 2	Wild Mammals (Protection) Act 1996	Alan Meale	Labour	Mansfield
Ballot 7	Treasure Act 1996	Anthony Grant	Conservative	South West Cambridgeshire
Ballot 8	Trading Schemes Act 1996	Nicholas Scott	Conservative	Chelsea
Ballot 3	Sexual Offences (Conspiracy and Incitement) Act 1996	John Marshall	Conservative	Hendon South
Ballot 11	Railway Heritage Act 1996	Mark Robinson	Conservative	Somerton & Frome
Ballot 20	Prisoners' Earnings Act 1996	Hartley Booth	Conservative	Finchley
Ballot 10	Offensive Weapons Act 1996	Lady Olga Maitland	Conservative	Sutton & Cheam
Ballot 15	Non-Domestic Rating (Information) Act 1996	Allan Stewart	Conservative	Eastwood
Ballot 5	Noise Act 1996	Harry Greenway	Conservative	Ealing North
Ballot 16	Law Reform (Year and a Day Rule) Act 1996	Doug Hoyle	Labour	Warrington North
Ballot 17	Energy Conservation Act 1996	Alan Simpson	Labour	Nottingham South
Ballot 18	Dogs (Fouling of Land) Act 1996	Andrew Hunter	Democratic Unionist Party	Basingstoke
10 minute rule	Public Order (Amendment) Act 1996	Estelle Morris	Labour	–
Presentation	Marriage Ceremony (Prescribed Words) Act 1996	Julian Brazier	Conservative	Canterbury

1996–97 parliamentary session
Type	Title of act	Presented by	Party	Constituency
Lords	Theft (Amendment) Act 1996	Lord Goff of Chieveley	Crossbench	–
Lords	Sea Fisheries (Shellfish)(Amendment) Act 1997	Baroness Wilcox	Conservative	–
Lords	Police (Insurance of Voluntary Assistants) Act 1997	Lord Brabazon of Tara	Conservative	–
Lords	Land Registration Act 1997	Lord Browne-Wilkinson	Crossbench	–
Lords	Horserace Totalisator Board Act 1997	Lord Kimball	Conservative	–
Lords	Dangerous Dogs (Amendment) Act 1997	Viscount Falkland	Crossbench	–
Lords	British Nationality (Hong Kong) Act 1997	Lord Willoughby de Broke	Other	–
Ballot 10	United Nations Personnel Act 1997	John Marshall	Conservative	Hendon South
Ballot 9	Telecommunications (Fraud) Act 1997	Ian Bruce	Conservative	South Dorset
Ballot 16	Sexual Offences (Protected Material) Act 1997	Robert G Hughes	Conservative	Harrow West
Ballot 7	Road Traffic (Reduction) Act 1997	Don Foster	Liberal Democrat	Bath
Ballot 2	Public Entertainments Licences (Drug Misuse) Act 1997	Barry Legg	Conservative	Milton Keynes South West
Ballot 6	Prisons (Alcohol Testing) Act 1997	John Ward	Conservative	Poole
Ballot 18	Policyholders Protection Act 1997	John Butterfill	Conservative	Bournemouth West
Ballot 19	Police (Property) Act 1997	David Evennett	Conservative	Bexleyheath and Crayford
Ballot 15	Police (Health and Safety) Act 1997	Ray Whitney	Conservative	Wycombe
Ballot 20	Pharmacists (Fitness to Practise) Act 1997	Michael Shersby	Conservative	Uxbridge
Ballot 12	Local Government (Gaelic Names) (Scotland) Act 1997	Tommy Graham	Independent Labour	Renfrew West & Inverclyde
Ballot 1	Knives Act 1997	Jimmy Wray	Labour	Glasgow, Baillieston
Ballot 8	Criminal Evidence (Amendment) Act 1997	Nigel Evans	Conservative	Ribble Valley
Ballot 3	Confiscation of Alcohol (Young Persons) Act 1997	Bob Spink	Conservative	Castle Point
10 minute rule	Building Societies (Distributions) Act 1997	Douglas French	Conservative	Gloucester

1997–98 parliamentary session
Type	Title of act	Presented by	Party	Constituency
Lords	Employment Rights (Dispute Resolution) Act 1998	Lord Archer of Sandwell	Labour	–
Lords	Criminal Justice (International Co-operation) Amendment Act 1998	Lord Evans of Parkside	Labour	–
Ballot 5	Road Traffic Reduction (National Targets) Act 1998	Cynog Dafis	Plaid Cymru	Ceredigion
Ballot 10	Public Interest Disclosure Act 1998	Richard Shepherd	Conservative	Aldridge-Brownhills
Ballot 4	Private Hire Vehicles (London) Act 1998	George Young	Conservative	North West Hampshire
Ballot 17	Pesticides Act 1998	Ben Bradshaw	Labour	Exeter
Ballot 14	Community Care (Residential Accommodation) Act 1998	Marsha Singh	Labour	Bradford West
10 minute rule	Animal Health (Amendment) Act 1998	Paul Flynn	Labour	Newport West
Presentation	Waste Minimisation Act 1998	Angela Smith	Labour	Penistone and Stocksbridge
Presentation	Registered Establishments (Scotland) Act 1998	Dr Lynda Clark	Labour	Edinburgh Pentlands

1998–99 parliamentary session
Type	Title of act	Presented by	Party	Constituency
Lords	Criminal Cases Review (Insanity) Act 1999	Lord Ackner	Crossbench	–
Ballot 14	Road Traffic (Vehicle Testing) Act 1999	Andrew Hunter	Democratic Unionist Party	Basingstoke
Ballot 1	Protection of Children Act 1999	Debra Shipley	Labour	Stourbridge
Ballot 3	Mental Health (Amendment) (Scotland) Act 1999	Eric Clarke	Labour	Midlothian
Ballot 6	Football (Offences and Disorder) Act 1999	Simon Burns	Conservative	Chelmsford
Ballot 19	Company and Business Names (Chamber of Commerce etc.) Act 1999	Andrew Lansley	Conservative	South Cambridgeshire
Ballot 15	Breeding and Sale of Dogs (Welfare) Act 1999	James Clappison	Conservative	Hertsmere
Ballot 7	Adoption (Intercountry Aspects) Act 1999	Mark Oaten	Liberal Democrat	Winchester

1999-00 parliamentary session
Type	Title of act	Presented by	Party	Constituency
Lords	Census (Amendment) Act 2000	Bernard Weatherill, Lord Weatherill	Crossbench	–
Ballot 5	Warm Homes and Energy Conservation Act 2000	David Amess	Conservative	Southend West
Ballot 20	Protection of Animals (Amendment) Act 2000	Claire Curtis-Thomas	Labour	Crosby
Ballot 3	Licensing (Young Persons) Act 2000	Paul Truswell	Labour	Pudsey
Ballot 4	Health Service Commissioners (Amendment) Act 2000	Geoffrey Johnson Smith	Conservative	Wealden
Ballot 2	Carers and Disabled Children Act 2000	Tom Pendry	Labour	Stalybridge & Hyde

=== 2000s ===
2001–02 parliamentary session
Type	Title of act	Presented by	Party	Constituency
Lords	National Heritage Act 2002	Baroness Anelay of St Johns	Conservative	–
Ballot 7	Industrial and Provident Societies Act 2002	Gareth Thomas	Labour	Harrow West
Ballot 6	Employee Share Schemes Act 2002	Mark Lazarowicz	Labour (Co-op)	Edinburgh North and Leith
Ballot 16	Copyright (Visually Impaired Persons) Act 2002	Rachel Squire	Labour	Dunfermline and West Fife
Ballot 10	Copyright, etc. and Trade Marks (Offences and Enforcement) Act 2002	Dr Vincent Cable	Liberal Democrat	Twickenham
Ballot 18	Commonwealth Act 2002	David Willetts	Conservative	Havant
Ten Minute Rule	Divorce (Religious Marriages) Act 2002	Andrew Dismore	Labour	Hendon
Ten Minute Rule	Private Hire Vehicles (Carriage of Guide Dogs etc.) Act 2002	Neil Gerrard	Labour	Walthamstow

2002–03 parliamentary session
Type	Title of act	Presented by	Party	Constituency
Ballot 6	Sustainable Energy Act 2003	Brian White	Labour	North East Milton Keynes
Ballot 2	Sunday Working (Scotland) Act 2003	David Cairns	Labour	Inverclyde
Ballot 13	Ragwort Control Act 2003	John Greenway	Conservative	Ryedale
Ballot 10	National Lottery (Funding of Endowments) Act 2003	Keith Simpson	Conservative	Broadland
Ballot 17	Marine Safety Act 2003	Dr Brian Iddon	Labour	Bolton South East
Ballot 12	Legal Deposit Libraries Act 2003	Chris Mole	Labour	Ipswich
Ballot 11	Human Fertilisation and Embryology (Deceased Fathers) Act 2003	Stephen McCabe	Labour	Birmingham Hall Green
Ballot 5	Household Waste Recycling Act 2003	Joan Ruddock	Labour	Lewisham Deptford
Ballot 3	Fireworks Act 2003	Bill Tynan	Labour	Hamilton South
Ballot 7	Female Genital Mutilation Act 2003	Ann Clwyd	Labour	Cynon Valley
Ballot 16	Dealing in Cultural Objects (Offences) Act 2003	Richard Allan	Liberal Democrat	Sheffield
Ballot 1	Co-operatives and Community Benefit Societies Act 2003	Mark Todd	Labour	South Derbyshire

2003–04 parliamentary session
Type	Title of act	Presented by	Party	Constituency
Ballot 1	Sustainable and Secure Buildings Act 2004	Andrew Stunell	Liberal Democrat	Hazel Grove
Ballot 3	Gangmasters (Licensing) Act 2004	Jim Sheridan	Labour	Paisley and Renfrewshire North
Ballot 16	Highways (Obstruction by Body Corporate) Act 2004	Michael Jabez Foster	Labour	Hastings & Rye
Ballot 6	Christmas Day (Trading) Act 2004	Kevan Jones	Labour	North Durham
Ballot 2	Carers (Equal Opportunities) Act 2004	Dr Hywel Francis	Labour	Aberavon

2004–05 parliamentary session
Type	Title of act	Presented by	Party	Constituency
No private members' bills were passed in this session.

2005–06 parliamentary session
Type	Title of act	Presented by	Party	Constituency
Ballot 7	Emergency Workers (Obstruction) Act 2006	Alan Williams	Labour	Carmarthen East & Dinefwr
Ballot 6	International Development (Reporting and Transparency) Act 2006	Tom Clarke	Labour	Coatbridge, Chryston and Bellshill
Ballot 4	Climate Change and Sustainable Energy Act 2006	Mark Lazarowicz	Labour (Co-op)	Edinburgh North and Leith

2006–07 parliamentary session
Type	Title of act	Presented by	Party	Constituency
Lords	Forced Marriage (Civil Protection) Act 2007	Lord Lester of Herne Hill	Liberal Democrat	–
Ballot 10	Vehicle Registration Marks Act 2007	Richard Ottaway	Conservative	Croydon South
Ballot 7	Building Societies (Funding) and Mutual Societies (Transfers) Act 2007	John Butterfill	Conservative	Bournemouth West
Ballot 1	Sustainable Communities Act 2007	Nick Hurd	Conservative	Ruislip, Northwood and Pinner

2007–08 parliamentary session
Type	Title of act	Presented by	Party	Constituency
Ballot 9	Health and Safety (Offences) Act 2008	Keith Hill	Labour	Streatham
Ballot 2	Special Educational Needs (Information) Act 2008	Sharon Hodgson	Labour	Washington and Sunderland West
Ballot 1	Planning and Energy Act 2008	Michael Fallon	Conservative	Sevenoaks

2008–09 parliamentary session
Type	Title of act	Presented by	Party	Constituency
Lords	Law Commission Act 2009	Lord Lloyd of Berwick	Crossbench	–
Presentation	Holocaust (Return of Cultural Objects) Act 2009	Andrew Dismore	Labour	Hendon
Presentation	Driving Instruction (Suspension and Exemption Powers) Act 2009	Willie Rennie	Liberal Democrat	Dunfermline and West Fife
Ballot 7	Green Energy (Definition and Promotion) Act 2009	Peter Ainsworth	Conservative	East Surrey
Ballot 1	Autism Act 2009	Cheryl Gillan	Conservative	Chesham and Amersham

2009–10 parliamentary session
Type	Title of act	Presented by	Party	Constituency
Lords	Marriage (Wales) Act 2010	Lord Rowe-Beddoe	Crossbench	–
Lords	Co-operative and Community Benefit Societies and Credit Unions Act 2010	Lord Tomlinson	Labour	–
Ballot 7	Sustainable Communities Act 2007 (Amendment) Act 2010	Alistair Burt	Conservative	North East Bedfordshire
Ballot 6	Anti-Slavery Day Act 2010	Anthony Steen	Conservative	Totnes
Ballot 5	Sunbeds (Regulation) Act 2010	Julie Morgan	Labour	Cardiff North
Ballot 3	Debt Relief Developing Countries Act 2010	Andrew Gwynne	Labour	Denton and Reddish
Ballot 1	Mortgage Repossessions (Protection of Tenants etc.) Act 2010	Dr Brian Iddon	Labour	Bolton South East

=== 2010s ===
2010–12 parliamentary session
Type	Title of act	Presented by	Party	Constituency
Lords	Live Music Act 2012	Lord Clement-Jones	Liberal Democrat	-
Ballot 19	Domestic Violence, Crime and Victims (Amendment) Act 2012	Sir Paul Beresford	Conservative	Mole Valley
Ballot 15	Wreck Removal Convention Act 2011	Dr Thérèse Coffey	Conservative	Suffolk Coastal
Ballot 14	Sports Grounds Safety Authority Act 2011	Jonathan Lord	Conservative	Woking
Ballot 13	Coinage (Measurement) Act 2011	Mark Lancaster	Conservative	Milton Keynes North
Ballot 5	Estates of Deceased Persons (Forfeiture Rule and Law of Succession) Act 2011	Sir Greg Knight	Conservative	East Yorkshire
Ballot 3	Public Services (Social Enterprise and Social Value) Act 2012	Chris White	Conservative	Warwick and Leamington

2012–13 parliamentary session
Type	Title of act	Presented by	Party	Constituency
Ballot 12	Marine Navigation (No. 2) Act 2013	Sheryll Murray	Conservative	South East Cornwall
Ballot 5	Mobile Homes Act 2013	Peter Aldous	Conservative	Waveney
Ballot 14	Presumption of Death Act 2013	John Glen	Conservative	Salisbury
Ballot 7	Antarctic Act 2013	Neil Carmichael	Conservative	Stroud
Ballot 17	Disabled Persons' Parking Badges Act 2013	Simon Kirby	Conservative	Brighton, Kemptown
Ballot 11	Prisons (Property) Act 2013	Stuart Andrew	Conservative	Pudsey
Ballot 9	Prevention of Social Housing Fraud Act 2013	Richard Harrington	Conservative	Watford
Ballot 8	Prisons (Interference with Wireless Telegraphy) Act 2012	Sir Paul Beresford	Conservative	Mole Valley
Ballot 4	Mental Health (Discrimination) (No.2) Act 2013	Gavin Barwell	Conservative	Croydon Central
Ballot 2	Scrap Metal Dealers Act 2013	Sir Richard Ottaway	Conservative	Croydon South

2013–14 parliamentary session
Type	Title of act	Presented by	Party	Constituency
Ballot 3	Citizenship (Armed Forces) Act 2014	Jonathan Lord	Conservative	Woking
Ballot 4	Deep Sea Mining Act 2014	Sheryll Murray	Conservative	South East Cornwall
Ballot 5	House of Lords Reform (No. 2) Act 2014	Dan Byles	Conservative	North Warwickshire
Ballot 18	International Development (Gender Equality) Act 2014	Sir William Cash	Conservative	Stone
Presentation	Leasehold Reform (Amendment) Act 2014	Philip Hollobone	Conservative	Kettering

2014–15 parliamentary session
Type	Title of act	Presented by	Party	Constituency
Ballot 2	International Development (Official Development Assistance Target) Act 2015	Michael Moore	Liberal Democrat	Berwickshire, Roxburgh and Selkirk
Ballot 4	Self-build and Custom Housebuilding Act 2015	Richard Bacon	Conservative	South Norfolk
Ballot 5	Health and Social Care (Safety and Quality) Act 2015	Jeremy Lefroy	Conservative	Stafford
Ballot 8	Control of Horses Act 2015	Julian Sturdy	Conservative	York Outer
Ballot 9	Local Government (Review of Decisions) Act 2015	Mark Spencer	Conservative	Sherwood
Ballot 13	Local Government (Religious etc. Observances) Act 2015	Jake Berry	Conservative	Rossendale and Darwen
Ballot 19	Health Service Commissioner for England (Complaint Handling) Act 2015	David Davis	Conservative	Haltemprice and Howden
10 minute rule	Specialist Printing Equipment and Materials (Offences) Act 2015	Sir David Amess	Conservative	Southend West
Lords	House of Lords (Expulsion and Suspension)	Baroness Hayman	Crossbench	-
Lords	Mutuals' Deferred Shares Act 2015	Lord Naseby	Conservative	-

2015–16 parliamentary session
Type	Title of act	Presented by	Party	Constituency
Ballot 2	Access to Medical Treatments (Innovation) Act 2016	Chris Heaton-Harris	Conservative	Daventry
Ballot 5	NHS (Charitable Trusts Etc) Act 2016	Wendy Morton	Conservative	Aldridge-Brownhills
Ballot 7	Riot Compensation Act 2016	Mike Wood	Conservative	Dudley South
Ballot 14	Criminal Cases Review Commission Act 2016	William Wragg	Conservative	Hazel Grove
10 minute rule	Driving Instructors (Registration) Act 2016	Sir David Amess	Conservative	Southend West
10 minute rule	House of Commons (Members' Fund) Act 2016	Sir Paul Beresford	Conservative	Mole Valley

2016–17 parliamentary session
Type	Title of act	Presented by	Party	Constituency
Ballot 12	Farriers (Registration) Act 2017	Byron Davies	Conservative	Gower
Ballot 2	Homelessness Reduction Act 2017	Bob Blackman	Conservative	Harrow East
Ballot 18	Merchant Shipping (Homosexual Conduct) Act 2017	John Glen	Conservative	Salisbury
Ballot 13	Parking Places (Variation of Charges) Act 2017	David Tredinnick	Conservative	Bosworth
Ballot 7	Preventing and Combating Violence Against Women and Domestic Violence (Ratification of Convention) Act 2017	Eilidh Whiteford	SNP	Banff and Buchan
10 minute rule	Guardianship (Missing Persons) Act 2017	Kevin Hollinrake	Conservative	Thirsk and Malton
Presentation	Broadcasting (Radio Multiplex Services) Act 2017	Kevin Foster	Conservative	Torbay
Presentation	Local Audit (Public Access to Documents) Act 2017	Wendy Morton	Conservative	Aldridge-Brownhills

2017–19 parliamentary session
Type	Title of act	Presented by	Party	Constituency
Ballot	Assaults on Emergency Workers (Offences) Act 2018	Chris Bryant	Labour	Rhondda
Ballot	Civil Partnerships, Marriages and Deaths (Registration etc) Act 2019	Tim Loughton	Conservative	Worthing East & Shoreham
Ballot	Homes (Fitness for Human Habitation) Act 2018	Karen Buck	Labour	Westminster North
Ballot	Mental Health Units (Use of Force) Act 2018	Steve Reed	Labour	Croydon Central
Ballot	Organ Donation (Deemed Consent) Act 2019	Geoffrey Robinson	Labour	Coventry North West
Ballot	Parental Bereavement (Leave and Pay) Act 2018	Kevin Hollinrake	Conservative	Thirsk & Malton
Ballot	Prisons (Interference with Wireless Telegraphy) Act 2018	Maria Caulfield	Conservative	Lewes
Ballot	Stalking Protection Act 2019	Sarah Wollaston	Conservative	Totnes
Ballot	Parking (Code of Practice) Act 2019	Sir Greg Knight	Conservative	East Yorkshire
10 Minute Rule	Holocaust (Return of Cultural Objects) (Amendment) Act 2019	Theresa Villiers	Conservative	Chipping Barnet
Presentation	Animal Welfare (Service Animals) Act 2019	Sir Oliver Heald	Conservative	Hertfordshire North East
Presentation	European Union (Withdrawal) Act 2019	Yvette Cooper	Labour	Normanton, Castleford & Pontefract
Presentation	European Union (Withdrawal) (No. 2) Act 2019	Hilary Benn	Labour	Leeds Central
House of Lords	Children Act 1989 (Amendment) (Female Genital Mutilation) Act 2019	Lord Berkeley of Knighton	Crossbencher	-

2019–21 parliamentary session
Type	Title of act	Presented by	Party	Constituency
Ballot	Animal Welfare (Sentencing) Act 2021	Chris Loder	Conservative	Dorset West
Ballot	Botulinum Toxin and Cosmetic Fillers (Children) Act 2021	Laura Trott	Conservative	Sevenoaks
Ballot	British Library Board (Power to Borrow) Act 2021	Bim Afolami	Conservative	Hitchin & Harpenden
Ballot	Education (Guidance about Costs of School Uniforms) Act 2021	Mike Amesbury	Labour	Weaver Vale
Ballot	Education and Training (Welfare of Children) Act 2021	Mary Foy	Labour	City of Durham
Ballot	Forensic Science Regulator Act 2021	Darren Jones	Labour	Bristol North West
Ballot	Prisons (Substance Testing) Act 2021	Dame Cheryl Gillan	Conservative	Chesham & Amersham

=== 2020s ===
2021–22 parliamentary session
Type	Title of act	Presented by	Party	Constituency
Ballot	Animals (Penalty Notices) Act 2022	Andrew Rosindell	Conservative	Romford
Ballot	British Sign Language Act 2022	Rosie Cooper	Labour	West Lancashire
Ballot	Cultural Objects (Protection from Seizure) Act 2022	Mel Stride	Conservative	Central Devon
Ballot	Down Syndrome Act 2022	Liam Fox	Conservative	North Somerset
Ballot	Education (Careers Guidance in Schools) Act 2022	Mark Jenkinson	Conservative	Workington
Ballot	Glue Traps (Offences) Act 2022	Jane Stevenson	Conservative	Wolverhampton North East
Ballot	Local Government (Disqualification) Act 2022	Sir Paul Beresford	Conservative	Mole Valley
Ballot	Marriage and Civil Partnership (Minimum Age) Act 2022	Pauline Latham	Conservative	Mid Derbyshire
Ballot	Pension Schemes (Conversion of Guaranteed Minimum Pensions) Act 2022	Margaret Ferrier	Independent	Rutherglen & Hamilton West
Ballot	Taxis and Private Hire Vehicles (Disabled Persons) Act 2022	Jeremy Wright	Conservative	Kenilworth & Southam
Ballot	Taxis and Private Hire Vehicles (Safeguarding and Road Safety) Act 2022	Peter Gibson	Conservative	Darlington
Presentation	Approved Premises (Substance Testing) Act 2022	Rob Butler	Conservative	Aylesbury
Presentation	Motor Vehicles (Compulsory Insurance) Act 2022	Peter Bone	Conservative	Wellingborough

2022–23 parliamentary session
Type	Title of act	Presented by	Party	Constituency
Presentation	Animals (Low-Welfare Activities Abroad) Act 2023	Angela Richardson	Conservative	Guildford
House of Lords	Ballot Secrecy Act 2023	Lord Hayward	Conservative	-
Ballot	Carer's Leave Act 2023	Wendy Chamberlain	Liberal Democrat	North East Fife
Ballot	Child Support (Enforcement) Act 2023	Siobhan Baillie	Conservative	Stroud
Ballot	Child Support Collection (Domestic Abuse) Act 2023	Sally-Ann Hart	Conservative	Hastings and Rye
Ballot	Co-operatives, Mutuals and Friendly Societies Act 2023	Sir Mark Hendrick	Labour	Preston
Ballot	Electricity Transmission (Compensation) Act 2023	Dr Liam Fox	Conservative	North Somerset
Ballot	Employment (Allocation of Tips) Act 2023	Virginia Crosbie	Conservative	Ynys Môn
Ballot	Employment Relations (Flexible Working) Act 2023	Yasmin Qureshi	Labour	Bolton South East
Ballot	Equipment Theft (Prevention) Act 2023	Greg Smith	Conservative	Buckingham
Presentation	Firearms Act 2023	Shaun Bailey	Conservative	West Bromwich West
Presentation	Mobile Homes (Pitch Fees) Act 2023	Sir Christopher Chope	Conservative	Christchurch
Ballot	Neonatal Care (Leave and Pay) Act 2023	Stuart McDonald	Scottish National Party	Cumbernauld, Kilsyth and Kirkintilloch East
Ballot	Offenders (Day of Release from Detention) Act 2023	Simon Fell	Conservative	Barrow and Furness
Ballot	Pensions (Extension of Automatic Enrolment) Act 2023	Jonathan Gullis	Conservative	Stoke-on-Trent North
Ballot	Pensions Dashboards (Prohibition of Indemnification) Act 2023	Mary Robinson	Conservative	Cheadle
Ballot	Powers of Attorney Act 2023	Stephen Metcalfe	Conservative	South Basildon and East Thurrock
Ballot	Protection from Redundancy (Pregnancy and Family Leave) Act 2023	Dan Jarvis	Labour	Barnsley Central
Ballot	Protection from Sex-based Harassment in Public Act 2023	Greg Clark	Conservative	Tunbridge Wells
Ballot	Shark Fins Act 2023	Christina Rees	Labour	Neath
Ballot	Supported Housing (Regulatory Oversight) Act 2023	Bob Blackman	Conservative	Harrow East
Presentation	Veterans Advisory and Pensions Committees Act 2023	Robin Millar	Conservative	Aberconwy
Ballot	Worker Protection (Amendment of Equality Act 2010) Act 2023	Wera Hobhouse	Liberal Democrat	Bath
Presentation	Workers (Predictable Terms and Conditions) Act 2023	Scott Benton	Conservative	Blackpool South

2023–24 parliamentary session
Type	Title of act	Presented by	Party	Constituency
Ballot	Pet Abduction Act 2024	Anna Firth	Conservative	Southend West
Ballot	Paternity Leave (Bereavement) Act 2024	Chris Elmore	Labour	Ogmore

=== Current parliamentary session ===
The ballot took place on 5 September 2024. The names drawn, headed by Kim Leadbeater, MP for Batley and Spen, included 15 Labour members, four Liberal Democrats, and one Traditional Unionist Voice member.

2024–25 parliamentary session
Type	Title of act	Presented by	Party	Constituency
Ballot				
