= Hate Crime (Misogyny) Bill =

Private Member's Bill sponsored by Wera Hobhouse MP

The Hate Crime (Misogyny) Bill was a Private Member's Bill submitted to the House of Commons of the Parliament of the United Kingdom in the 2021-2022 session of Parliament. It was sponsored by Wera Hobhouse, the Liberal Democrat MP for Bath. Its principal goal was make misogyny an aggravating factor in criminal sentencing.
