= Family voting =

Form of electoral fraud

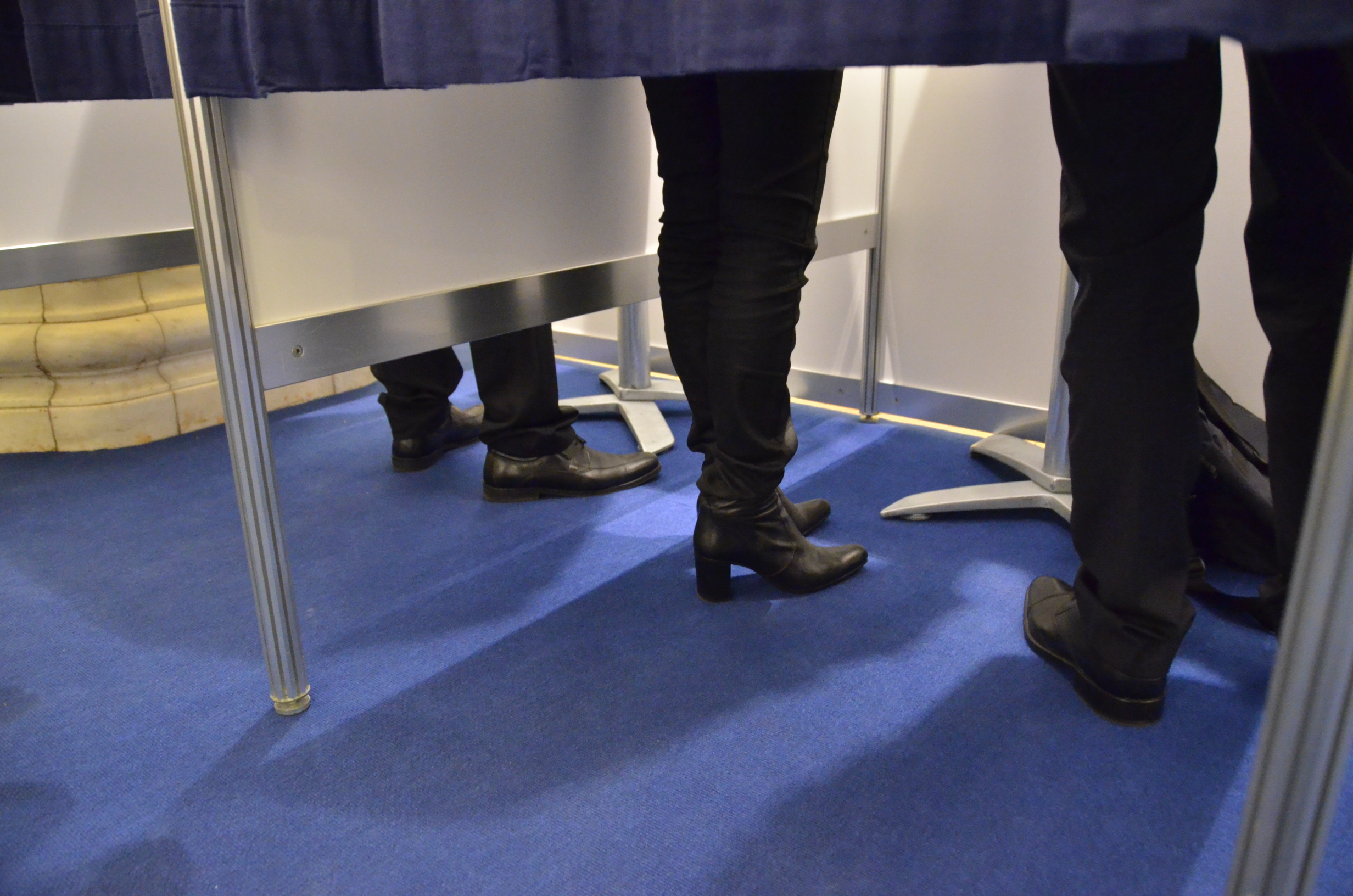
Two people in the same voting booth

Family voting is a form of electoral fraud, where family members enter a voting booth together and collude, discuss, or direct voting intentions. Family voting violates the individual voter sovereignty and secret ballot principles of free and fair elections, by enabling undue influence and coercion during the voting process. It can also occur during postal voting.

Research in Turkey in 2019 suggested that family voting had been under-reported there. In 2023, the United Kingdom passed the Ballot Secrecy Act to make it an offence for a person to "accompany an elector into a polling booth; or position near an elector inside a polling station with the intention of influencing how they cast their vote".

== See also ==
- Demeny voting – Type of proxy voting on behalf of children
