= List of acts of the Parliament of the United Kingdom from 2009 =

This is a list of acts of the Parliament of the United Kingdom passed in 2009.

Acts passed since 1963 are cited by calendar year, as opposed to the convention used for earlier acts of citing the regnal year(s) in which the relevant parliamentary session was held. Each act passed in a respective year is given a chapter number (abbreviated "c."), denoted by Arabic numerals in the case of public general acts, lowercase Roman numerals in the case of local acts, or italicised Arabic numerals in the case of personal acts. These run as separate series.

28 acts of Parliament were passed in 2009: 27 public general acts and 1 local act.

indicates that an act has been transcribed on Wikisource, indicates that an act is available to view at legislation.gov.uk, and indicates the location of the original act in the Parliamentary Archives.

== Public general acts ==
Short title	Citation	Royal assent
Long title
Banking Act 2009	2009 c. 1	12 February 2009
An Act to make provision about banking.
Appropriation Act 2009	2009 c. 2	12 March 2009
An Act to authorise the use of resources for the service of the years ending with 31 March 2008 and 31 March 2009 and to apply certain sums out of the Consolidated Fund to the service of the years ending with 31 March 2008 and 31 March 2009; and to appropriate the supply authorised in this Session of Parliament for the service of the years ending with 31 March 2008 and 31 March 2009.
Northern Ireland Act 2009	2009 c. 3	12 March 2009
An Act to make provision in relation to policing and justice in Northern Ireland; and to amend section 86 of the Northern Ireland Act 1998. (Note: Northern Ireland Act 1998 (c. 47))
Corporation Tax Act 2009	2009 c. 4	26 March 2009
An Act to restate, with minor changes, certain enactments relating to corporation tax; and for connected purposes.
Industry and Exports (Financial Support) Act 2009	2009 c. 5	21 May 2009
An Act to amend section 8(5) of the Industrial Development Act 1982 (Note: Industrial Development Act 1982 (c. 52)) and to amend section 1(1) of the Export and Investment Guarantees Act 1991. (Note: Export and Investment Guarantees Act 1991 (c. 67))
Geneva Conventions and United Nations Personnel (Protocols) Act 2009	2009 c. 6	2 July 2009
An Act to amend the Geneva Conventions Act 1957 (Note: Geneva Conventions Act 1957 (5 & 6 Eliz. 2. c. 52)) so as to give effect to the Protocol additional to the Geneva Conventions of 12 August 1949 done on 8 December 2005; and to amend the United Nations Personnel Act 1997 (Note: United Nations Personnel Act 1997 (c. 13)) so as to give effect to the Optional Protocol to the Convention on the Safety of United Nations and Associated Personnel adopted by the General Assembly of the United Nations on 8 December 2005.
Business Rate Supplements Act 2009	2009 c. 7	2 July 2009
An Act to confer power on the Greater London Authority and certain local authorities to impose a levy on non-domestic ratepayers to raise money for expenditure on projects expected to promote economic development; and for connected purposes.
Saving Gateway Accounts Act 2009 (repealed)	2009 c. 8	2 July 2009
An Act to make provision about Saving Gateway accounts; and for connected purposes. (Repealed by Savings Accounts and Health in Pregnancy Grant Act 2010 (c. 36))
Appropriation (No. 2) Act 2009	2009 c. 9	21 July 2009
An Act to authorise the use of resources for the service of the year ending with 31 March 2010 and to apply certain sums out of the Consolidated Fund to the service of the year ending with 31 March 2010; to appropriate the supply authorised in this Session of Parliament for the service of the year ending with 31 March 2010; and to repeal certain Consolidated Fund and Appropriation Acts.
Finance Act 2009	2009 c. 10	21 July 2009
An Act to grant certain duties, to alter other duties, and to amend the law relating to the National Debt and the Public Revenue, and to make further provision in connection with finance.
Borders, Citizenship and Immigration Act 2009	2009 c. 11	21 July 2009
An Act to provide for customs functions to be exercisable by the Secretary of State, the Director of Border Revenue and officials designated by them; to make provision about the use and disclosure of customs information; to make provision for and in connection with the exercise of customs functions and functions relating to immigration, asylum or nationality; to make provision about citizenship and other nationality matters; to make further provision about immigration and asylum; and for connected purposes.
Political Parties and Elections Act 2009	2009 c. 12	21 July 2009
An Act to make provision in connection with the Electoral Commission; to make provision about political donations, loans and related transactions and about political expenditure; and to make provision about elections and electoral registration.
Parliamentary Standards Act 2009	2009 c. 13	21 July 2009
An Act to make provision establishing a body corporate known as the Independent Parliamentary Standards Authority and an officer known as the Commissioner for Parliamentary Investigations; to make provision relating to salaries and allowances for members of the House of Commons and to their financial interests and conduct; and for connected purposes.
Law Commission Act 2009	2009 c. 14	12 November 2009
An Act to make provision in relation to the Law Commission.
Autism Act 2009	2009 c. 15	12 November 2009
An Act to make provision about meeting the needs of adults with autistic spectrum conditions; and for connected purposes.
Holocaust (Return of Cultural Objects) Act 2009	2009 c. 16	12 November 2009
An Act to confer power to return certain cultural objects on grounds relating to events occurring during the Nazi era.
Driving Instruction (Suspension and Exemption Powers) Act 2009	2009 c. 17	12 November 2009
An Act to provide for the suspension in certain circumstances of registration and licences relating to the provision of driving instruction; to make provision about exemptions from prohibitions concerning registration (including provision about suspension); to make provision about compensation in connection with suspension; and for connected purposes.
Perpetuities and Accumulations Act 2009	2009 c. 18	12 November 2009
An Act to amend the law relating to the avoidance of future interests on grounds of remoteness and the law relating to accumulations of income.
Green Energy (Definition and Promotion) Act 2009	2009 c. 19	12 November 2009
An Act to define the term "green energy"; to promote its development, installation and usage; and for connected purposes.
Local Democracy, Economic Development and Construction Act 2009	2009 c. 20	12 November 2009
An Act to make provision for the purposes of promoting public involvement in relation to local authorities and other public authorities; to make provision about bodies representing the interests of tenants; to make provision about local freedoms and honorary titles; to make provision about the procedures of local authorities, their powers relating to insurance and the audit of entities connected with them; to establish the Local Government Boundary Commission for England and to make provision relating to local government boundary and electoral change; to make provision about local and regional development; to amend the law relating to construction contracts; and for connected purposes.
Health Act 2009	2009 c. 21	12 November 2009
An Act to make provision about The NHS Constitution; to make provision about health care (including provision about the National Health Service and health bodies); to make provision for the control of the promotion and sale of tobacco products; to make provision about the investigation of complaints about privately arranged or funded adult social care; and for connected purposes.
Apprenticeships, Skills, Children and Learning Act 2009	2009 c. 22	12 November 2009
An Act to make provision about apprenticeships, education, training and children's services; to amend the Employment Rights Act 1996; (Note: Employment Rights Act 1996 (c. 18)) to establish the Young People's Learning Agency for England, the office of Chief Executive of Skills Funding, the Office of Qualifications and Examinations Regulation and the School Support Staff Negotiating Body and to make provision about those bodies and that office; to make provision about the Qualifications and Curriculum Authority; to make provision about schools and institutions within the further education sector; to make provision about student loans; and for connected purposes.
Marine and Coastal Access Act 2009	2009 c. 23	12 November 2009
An Act to make provision in relation to marine functions and activities; to make provision about migratory and freshwater fish; to make provision for and in connection with the establishment of an English coastal walking route and of rights of access to land near the English coast; to enable the making of Assembly Measures in relation to Welsh coastal routes for recreational journeys and rights of access to land near the Welsh coast; to make further provision in relation to Natural England and the Countryside Council for Wales; to make provision in relation to works which are detrimental to navigation; to amend the Harbours Act 1964; (Note: Harbours Act 1964 (c. 40)) and for connected purposes.
Welfare Reform Act 2009	2009 c. 24	12 November 2009
An Act to amend the law relating to social security; to make provision enabling disabled people to be given greater control over the way in which certain public services are provided for them; to amend the law relating to child support; to make provision about the registration of births; and for connected purposes.
Coroners and Justice Act 2009	2009 c. 25	12 November 2009
An Act to amend the law relating to coroners, to investigation of deaths and to certification and registration of deaths; to amend the criminal law; to make provision about criminal justice and about dealing with offenders; to make provision about the Commissioner for Victims and Witnesses; to make provision relating to the security of court and other buildings; to make provision about legal aid and about payments for legal services provided in connection with employment matters; to make provision for payments to be made by offenders in respect of benefits derived from the exploitation of material pertaining to offences; to amend the Data Protection Act 1998; (Note: Data Protection Act 1998 (c. 29)) and for connected purposes.
Policing and Crime Act 2009	2009 c. 26	12 November 2009
An Act to make provision about the police; to make provision about prostitution, sex offenders, sex establishments and certain other premises; to make provision for reducing and dealing with the abuse of alcohol; to make provision about the proceeds of crime; to make provision about extradition; to amend the Aviation Security Act 1982; (Note: Aviation Security Act 1982 (c. 36)) to make provision about criminal records and to amend the Safeguarding Vulnerable Groups Act 2006 (Note: Safeguarding Vulnerable Groups Act 2006 (c. 47)) and the Safeguarding Vulnerable Groups (Northern Ireland) Order 2007; (Note: Safeguarding Vulnerable Groups (Northern Ireland) Order 2007 (SI 2007/1351)) to confer, extend or facilitate search, forfeiture and other powers relating to the United Kingdom's borders or elsewhere; to make further provision for combatting crime and disorder; to repeal redundant provisions; and for connected purposes.
Consolidated Fund Act 2009	2009 c. 27	16 December 2009
An Act to authorise the use of resources for the service of the years ending with 31 March 2010 and 31 March 2011 and to apply certain sums out of the Consolidated Fund to the service of the years ending with 31 March 2010 and 31 March 2011.

== Local acts ==
Short title	Citation	Royal assent
Long title
Broads Authority Act 2009	2009 c. i	2 July 2009
An Act to confer further powers on the Broads Authority; to make other provisions as to that Authority; and for related purposes.

== See also ==
- List of acts of the Parliament of the United Kingdom
