= Ballot Secrecy Act 2023 =

Act of the Parliament of the United Kingdom

Ballot Secrecy Act 2023 (Note: Section 3(9).)
- Act of Parliament
- Parliament of the United Kingdom
- Long title: An Act to make provision for ensuring the secrecy of ballots cast in polling stations at elections; and for connected purposes.
- Citation: 2023 c. 12
- Introduced by: Paul Bristow (Commons); Lord Hayward (Lords)
- Territorial extent: England and Wales; Scotland; Northern Ireland; (Note: Section 3(1)–(2).)

Dates
- Royal assent: 2 May 2023
- Commencement: 2 May 2023 (section 3); 2 May 2024 (rest of act); (Note: Section 3(3)–(4). The Elections Act 2022 (Commencement No. 9, Transitional and Savings Provisions and Appointed and Specified Days) and Ballot Secrecy Act 2023 (Commencement) Regulations 2023 (SI 2023/1145).)
Other legislation
Amends	Electoral Law Act (Northern Ireland) 1962; Representation of the People Act 1983; Northern Ireland Assembly (Elections) Order 2001

Status: Current legislation

History of passage through Parliament

Text of statute as originally enacted

Revised text of statute as amended

The Ballot Secrecy Act 2023 (c. 12) is an act of Parliament of the United Kingdom.

== Passage ==
The Ballot Secrecy Bill was introduced in the House of Lords as a private member’s bill by Lord Hayward on 26 May 2022. It completed its Lords stages on 30 November 2022. Paul Bristow sponsored the bill in the House of Commons and it was given a second reading on 9 December 2022 without substantive debate.

The intention behind the bill was to prevent family voting.

== Provisions ==
The bill has one substantive clause, that amends section 60 of the Representation of the People Act 1983 to make it a criminal offence to be "near a polling booth when another person is at that booth" with the intention "to influence that other person to vote in a particular way or to refrain from voting".
