= International Development (Reporting and Transparency) Act 2006 =

Act of the Parliament of the United Kingdom

International Development (Reporting and Transparency) Act 2006 (Note: Section 9(1).)
- Act of Parliament
- Parliament of the United Kingdom
- Long title: An Act to require the Secretary of State to report annually on total expenditure on international aid and on the breakdown of such aid, and in particular on progress towards the target for expenditure on official development assistance to constitute 0.7 per cent of gross national income; to require such reports to contain information about expenditure by country, about the proportion of expenditure in low income countries and about the effectiveness of aid expenditure and the transparency of international aid; and for connected purposes.
- Citation: 2006 c. 31
- Territorial extent: United Kingdom

Dates
- Royal assent: 25 July 2006
- Commencement: 25 July 2006 (sections 7–9); 25 October 2006 (rest of act); (Note: Section 9(2). Section 4(b) of the Interpretation Act 1978.)
Other legislation
Amended by	Treaty of Lisbon (Changes in Terminology) Order 2011; International Development (Gender Equality) Act 2014; International Development (Official Development Assistance Target) Act 2015

Status: Partially repealed

History of passage through Parliament

Text of statute as originally enacted

Text of the International Development (Reporting and Transparency) Act 2006 as in force today (including any amendments) within the United Kingdom, from legislation.gov.uk.

The International Development (Reporting and Transparency) Act 2006 (c. 31) is an act of the Parliament of the United Kingdom.

Baroness Whitaker said that the purpose of the act is to ensure that the promises made by the government at the 31st G8 summit, and any future promises, are kept.

== Subsequent developments ==
Section 3 was repealed, with effect from 1 June 2015, by section 4 of the International Development (Official Development Assistance Target) Act 2015.

This act is amended by articles 3 and 4 of the Treaty of Lisbon (Changes in Terminology) Order 2011 (SI 2011/1043).

== Bibliography ==
- Halsbury's Statutes
