= Driving Instruction (Suspension and Exemption Powers) Act 2009 =

Act of the Parliament of the United Kingdom

Driving Instruction (Suspension and Exemption Powers) Act 2009 (Note: Section 7(1).)
- Act of Parliament
- Parliament of the United Kingdom
- Long title: An Act to provide for the suspension in certain circumstances of registration and licences relating to the provision of driving instruction; to make provision about exemptions from prohibitions concerning registration (including provision about suspension); to make provision about compensation in connection with suspension; and for connected purposes.
- Citation: 2009 c. 17
- Introduced by: Willie Rennie MP (Commons); Lord Tyler (Lords)
- Territorial extent: England and Wales and Scotland (Note: Section 7(4).)

Dates
- Royal assent: 12 November 2009
- Commencement: 12 November 2009 (sections 5 to 7); 8 June 2012 (section 4(1) and paragraph 7 of Schedule 1, for specified purposes); 6 July 2012 (section 4(1) and Schedule 1, so far as not already in force); (Note: Section 7(2) and (3). The Driving Instruction (Suspension and Exemption Powers) Act 2009 (Commencement No. 1) Order 2012 (SI 2012/1356).)

Status: Current legislation

History of passage through Parliament

Text of statute as originally enacted

Text of the Driving Instruction (Suspension and Exemption Powers) Act 2009 as in force today (including any amendments) within the United Kingdom, from legislation.gov.uk.

The Driving Instruction (Suspension and Exemption Powers) Act 2009 (c. 17) is an act of the Parliament of the United Kingdom.

Willie Rennie described it as his proudest moment in politics.

== Background ==
Before the act, there was a minimum of 45 days that it took to remove a person's name from the register of approved driving instructors could create a threat to the safety of members of the public.

The act was introduced in response to an incident that had been experienced by a constituent of Willie Rennie.

== Provisions ==
The act grants the power to suspend the registration of approved driving instructors immediately.

== Bibliography ==
- "Driving Instruction (Suspension and Exemption Powers) Act 2009". Current Law Statutes Annotated 2009. Sweet & Maxwell. Thomson Reuters. 2010. Volume 1. Chapter 17. pp 17-1 to 17-9.
- Halsbury's Statutes.
