= Wera Hobhouse =

British-German politician (born 1960)

Wera Hobhouse MP
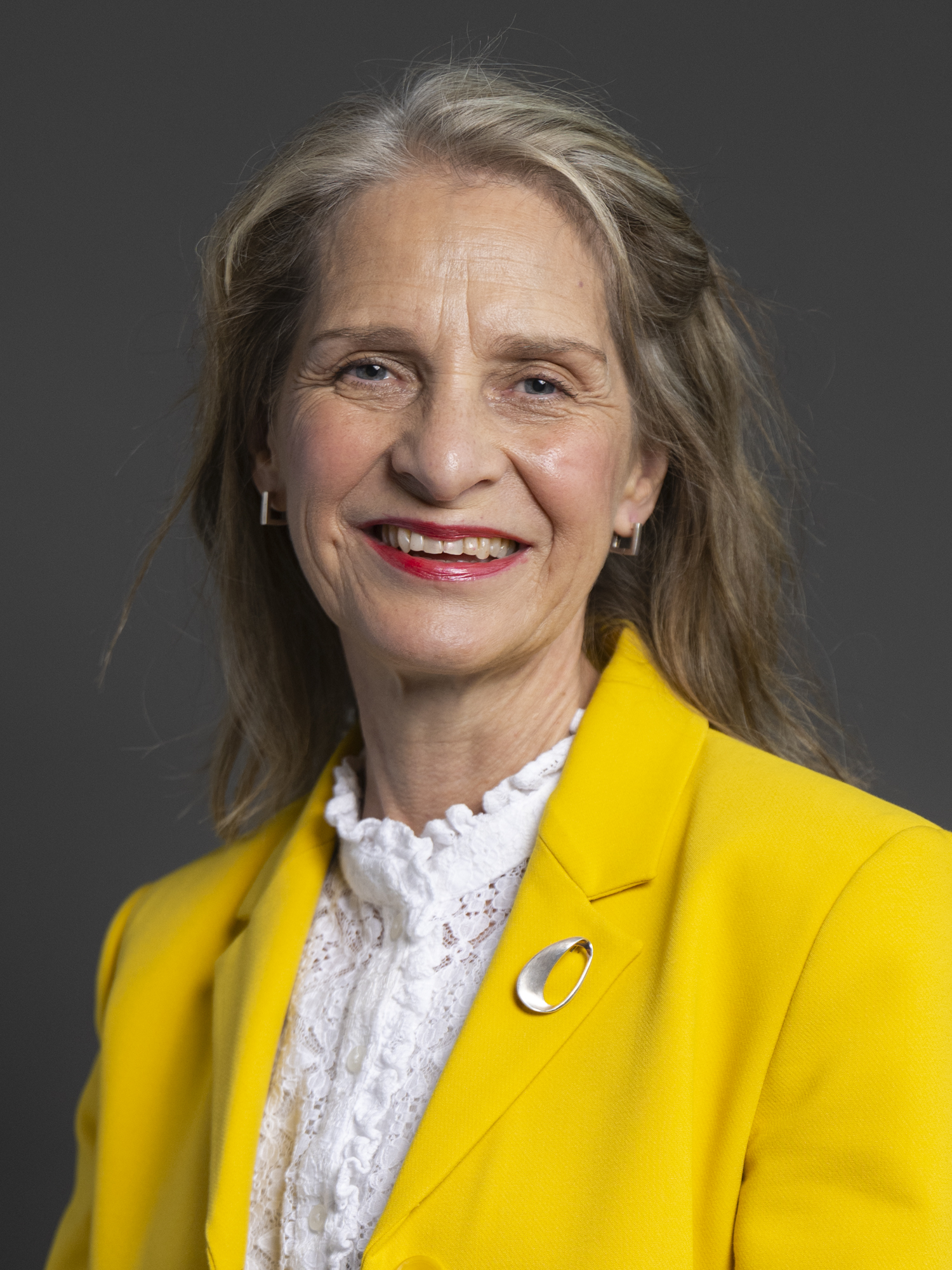
- Official portrait, 2024

Member of Parliament for Bath
- Incumbent
- Assumed office 8 June 2017
- Preceded by: Ben Howlett
- Majority: 11,218 (23.3%)

Rochdale Borough Councillor for Norden
- In office 2004–2014

Liberal Democrat portfolios
- 2017–2019: Communities and Local Government
- 2019–2020: Environment and Climate Change
- 2019, 2020–2022: Justice
- 2019–2020, 2022–2024: Transport
- 2020–2024: Energy and Climate Change
- 2020–2022: Women and Equalities
- 2020–2024: Leader of the House of Commons

Personal details
- Born: Wera Benedicta von Reden; 8 February 1960 (age 66) Hanover, Lower Saxony, West Germany
- Citizenship: British; German
- Party: Liberal Democrats (2005–present)
- Other political affiliations: Conservative (until 2005)
- Spouse: William Hobhouse (m. 1989)
- Children: 4
- Education: University of Münster (BA); Free University of Berlin (MA)
- Website: www.werahobhouse.co.uk

Wera Benedicta Hobhouse (née von Reden, 8 February 1960) is a British-German Liberal Democrat politician who has been the Member of Parliament (MP) for Bath since 2017.

Hobhouse has previously served on the Liberal Democrat front bench as spokesperson for Communities and Local Government, Environment, Food and Rural Affairs, Transport, Energy and Climate Change, and as the Shadow Leader of the House of Commons.

== Early life and career ==
Wera von Reden was born on 8 February 1960 in Hanover. She studied history and fine art at the University of Münster and then studied art for two years at the École des Beaux-Arts in Paris. She then moved back to Germany, completing a master's degree in history and fine art at the Free University of Berlin. She married William Hobhouse in 1989 and moved to England the following year. They first lived in Liverpool, where she opened an art gallery on Falkner Street; in 1999 they moved to Rochdale. Prior to her political career, she was a teacher, radio journalist and artist.

== Political career ==
Hobhouse was first elected in 2004 as a Conservative councillor for the ward of Norden on Rochdale Council, Greater Manchester. Her political career in Rochdale was defined by the Spodden Valley asbestos controversy, which was the proposed development of 650 homes on an asbestos-contaminated site. Hobhouse and her husband opposed the proposals, leading them to defect to the Liberal Democrats in 2005. They were criticised at the time for not triggering by-elections to seek fresh mandates as Liberal Democrat councillors. The development was successfully blocked in 2011.

Hobhouse was re-elected in 2006 and 2010 for the Liberal Democrats in Norden. The Liberal Democrats assumed majority control of Rochdale Council in 2007; Hobhouse served as the cabinet member for the environment between 2006 and 2009 and chaired the health scrutiny committee from 2009 to 2010. After the Liberal Democrats lost majority control of the council in 2010, Hobhouse was elected as the leader of the much-reduced Liberal Democrat group on Rochdale Council in May 2011. In July 2011, Hobhouse accused a council officer of failing to act impartially but later apologised after the council officer began legal action for defamation.

In 2014, she retired as a councillor for Norden and moved to Bath. In the local elections of May 2015, she stood unsuccessfully for election to the Bath and North East Somerset Council in the Peasedown ward. On the same day, at the 2015 general election, Hobhouse unsuccessfully contested the constituency of North East Somerset, finishing fourth with 7.9% of the vote behind the incumbent Conservative MP Jacob Rees-Mogg, the Labour candidate, and the UKIP candidate.

Hobhouse stood as the Liberal Democrat candidate in Heywood and Middleton at the 2010 general election, coming third with 22.7% of the vote behind the incumbent Labour MP Jim Dobbin and the Conservative candidate.

== Parliamentary career ==
In 2017, Hobhouse was selected as the Liberal Democrat prospective parliamentary candidate for the constituency of Bath. Hobhouse stood on a pro-European platform which emphasised housing, education, congestion and pollution concerns, as well as opposition to the incumbent Conservative MP's plans to link the A46 and A36 roads together. Her party emphasised the need for Labour supporters to vote tactically for Hobhouse to defeat the Conservatives. At the snap 2017 general election, Hobhouse was elected to Parliament as the MP for Bath with 47.3% of the vote and a majority of 5,694 votes.

Following her election, Hobhouse was appointed as the Liberal Democrat spokesperson for housing, communities and local government. She made her maiden speech on 29 June 2017, and sat on the Committee on Exiting the European Union.

On 6 March 2018, Hobhouse presented a private members' bill to amend the Sexual Offences Act 2003; her bill aimed to outlaw acts of voyeurism, especially upskirting, which were not then explicitly covered by UK law. Justice Secretary David Gauke signalled that the government would support Hobhouse's bill, which was later supported by the Prime Minister, Theresa May. Hobhouse's bill was not debated at its presentation in the House of Commons. At its second reading in the Commons on 15 June 2018, Conservative MP Christopher Chope objected to Hobhouse's bill, preventing its passage through the Commons. The Prime Minister, Theresa May, expressed her disappointment at the objection. Following his objection, the government reaffirmed its commitment to introduce legislation to outlaw upskirting. A government bill to outlaw upskirting was introduced to the Commons on 21 June 2018; and passed its second reading on 3 July 2018 to become the Voyeurism (Offences) Act 2019.

In an interview with HuffPost UK published in May 2018, Hobhouse warned against what she described as a "toxic" immigration debate in the UK. She acknowledged her party's "limited" resources following its electoral collapse at the 2015 general election, and affirmed that she was "happy" with Vince Cable as the party's leader. She urged the party to "do more" to increase its diversity. In July 2018, Hobhouse was criticised for claiming £4,800 in parliamentary expenses for a heavy duty colour printer. Defending her actions, Hobhouse said that she had saved the taxpayer £40,000 by taking over the lease from Bath's previous MP and that she required the printer for her constituency letters. In October 2018, Hobhouse's constituency office announced that it had completed 6,000 pieces of casework.

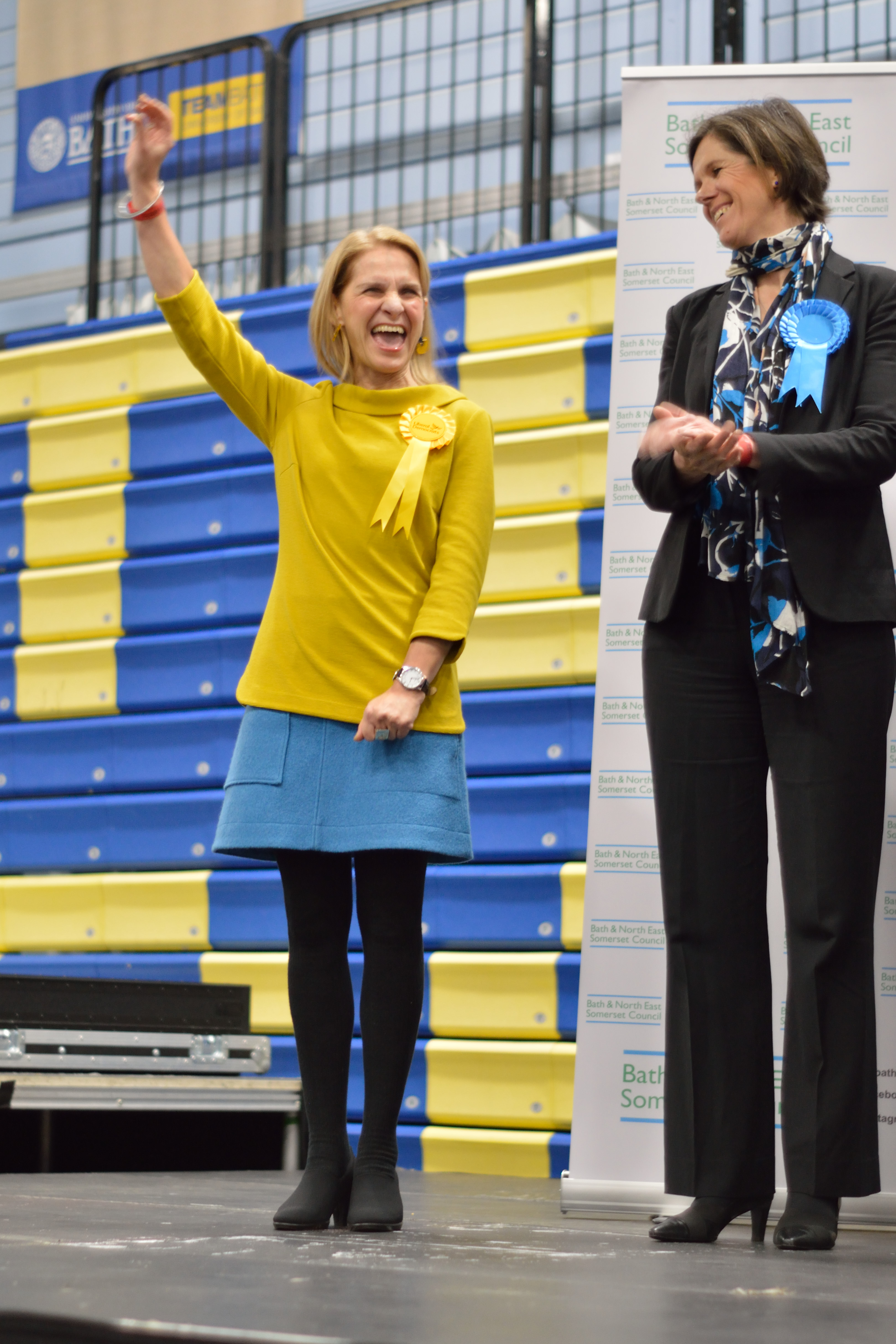
Wera Hobhouse announced winner at the Bath 2019 general election declaration, alongside Annabel Tall the Conservative candidate

In February 2019, Hobhouse was made the Liberal Democrat spokesperson for the environment and climate change. In this capacity, Hobhouse pushed for an end to most carbon emissions by 2030, and for net-zero carbon emissions to be achieved by 2045 at the latest. This became the policy position of the Liberal Democrats at their conference in September 2019, where Hobhouse gave a keynote speech on tackling the climate crisis. Among the proposals that she has promoted to meet these targets, Hobhouse has called for a permanent ban on fracking, for increased investment in renewable energy, for greater powers to be given to local authorities to cut emissions, and for all airport expansion to be halted until a replacement can be found for jet fuel.

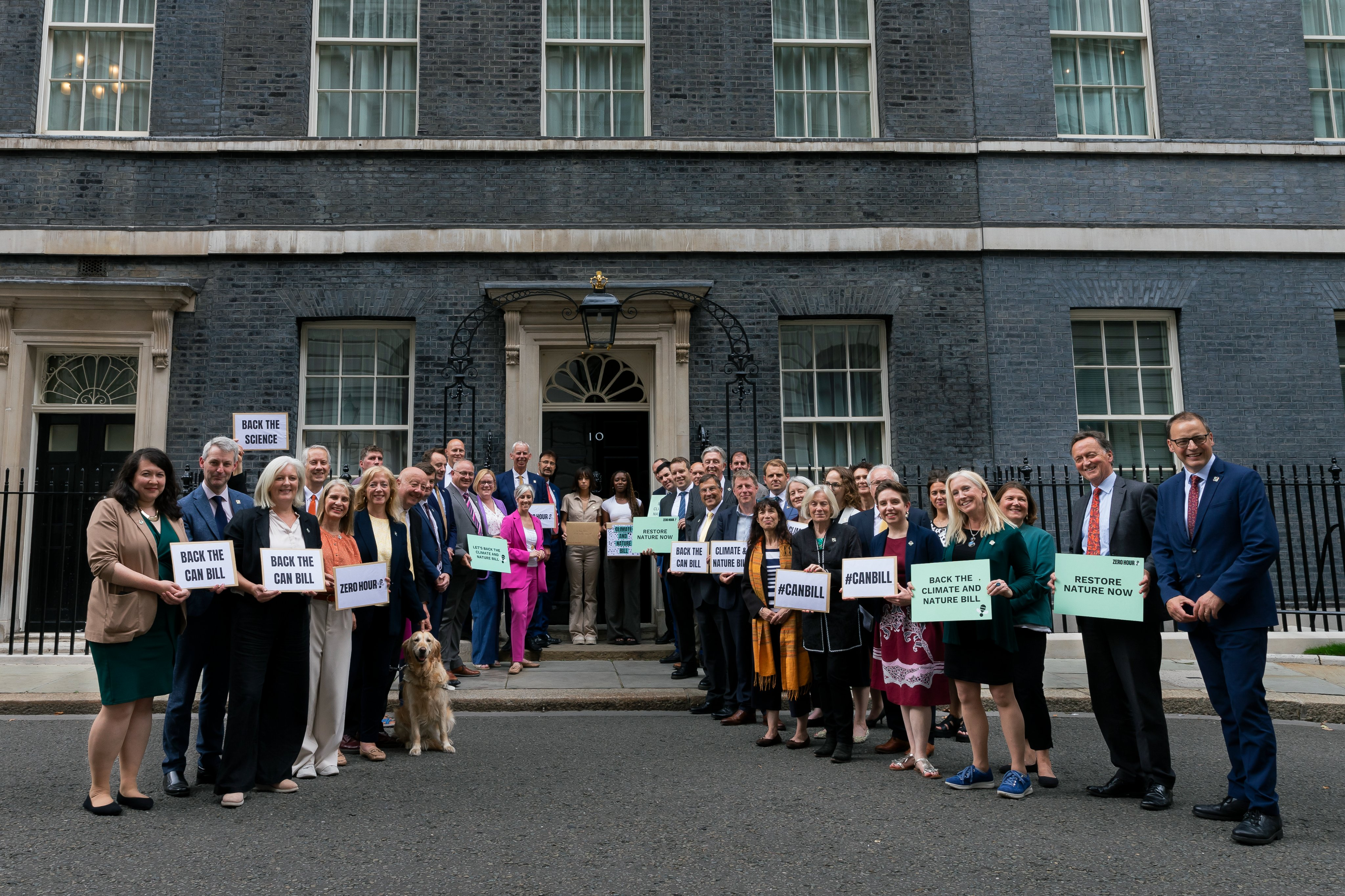
Hobhouse and other Climate and Nature Bill-supporting MPs

Hobhouse has also been a key advocate for the Climate and Nature Bill, acting as a sponsor, co-sponsor, and campaigner for the legislation across multiple parliamentary sessions; working closely with the Zero Hour campaign, including leading a delegation to 10 Downing Street to promote the bill's "integrated approach to climate and nature crises".

At the 2019 general election, Hobhouse was re-elected as MP for Bath with an increased vote share of 54.5% and an increased majority of 12,322.

In February 2020, Hobhouse announced that she would stand in the 2020 Liberal Democrats leadership election, before withdrawing in June and endorsing Layla Moran.

Hobhouse is a former member of the governing council of the Electoral Reform Society. She supports proportional representation for UK elections and claims that the coalition government's failure to secure electoral reform was its "biggest disappointment".

Hobhouse supported abortion reform in Northern Ireland, and has supported a campaign to improve the treatment of eating disorders, including by leading a parliamentary debate on destigmatising them. In local politics, she launched a petition to fund a large police station for the city.

In May 2021, alongside celebrities and other public figures, Hobhouse was a signatory to an open letter from Stylist magazine which called on the government to address what it described as an "epidemic of male violence" by funding an "ongoing, high-profile, expert-informed awareness campaign on men's violence against women and girls".

Hobhouse introduced a private members' bill, the Worker Protection (Amendment of Equality Act 2010) Bill, in the Commons to prevent sexual harassment in the workplace, which was thought would force a culture change in employment. The Worker Protection (Amendment of Equality Act 2010) Act 2023 received Royal Assent on 26 October 2023.

At the 2024 general election, Hobhouse was again re-elected, with a decreased vote share of 41.3% and a decreased majority of 11,218. She ceased to be a member of the frontbench team having been appointed to the Speaker's Panel of chairs. She is also a member of the Energy Security and Net Zero Select Committee.

== Personal life ==
Hobhouse has been married to the businessman William Hobhouse since 1989. They both cite the fall of the Berlin Wall as a pivotal moment in their lives, which they witnessed when they lived in Germany. They have four children, two sons and two daughters. She naturalised as a British citizen in 2007.

Hobhouse is a Christian. Although her mother and grandmother identified as Christian, her great-grandfather was Jewish, which meant that her family was persecuted under the Nuremberg Laws. Hobhouse is fluent in English, German, and French. She cites Barack Obama and William Wilberforce as her "political idols".

In April 2025, on arriving in Hong Kong to visit her son and newborn grandson who are resident there, Hobhouse (who is a member of the Inter-Parliamentary Alliance on China) was refused entry to Hong Kong and was deported.

Parliament of the United Kingdom
Preceded by Ben Howlett	Member of Parliament for Bath; 2017–present	Incumbent
