= Worker Protection (Amendment of Equality Act 2010) Act 2023 =

Act of the Parliament of the United Kingdom

Worker Protection (Amendment of Equality Act 2010) Act 2023 (Note: Section 5(4).)
- Act of Parliament
- Parliament of the United Kingdom
- Long title: An Act to make provision in relation to the duties of employers and the protection of workers under the Equality Act 2010.
- Citation: 2023 c. 51
- Introduced by: Wera Hobhouse (Commons); The Baroness Burt of Solihull (Lords)
- Territorial extent: England and Wales; Scotland; (Note: Section 5(1).)

Dates
- Royal assent: 26 October 2023
- Commencement: 26 October 2023 (section 5); 26 October 2024 (rest of act); (Note: Section 5(2)–(3).)
Other legislation
Amends	Equality Act 2006; Equality Act 2010

Status: Current legislation

History of passage through Parliament

Text of statute as originally enacted

Revised text of statute as amended

The Worker Protection (Amendment of Equality Act 2010) Act 2023 (c. 51) is an act of the Parliament of the United Kingdom. It was passed on 20 October 2023 and received royal assent on 26 October 2023. It was introduced as a private members' bill by Wera Hobhouse and Baroness Burt of Solihull. The aim of the act is to prevent sexual harassment in the workplace and drive a culture change. It was supported both in the House of Commons and the House of Lords by the Conservative Government, and was in the series of new employment law reforms of the 2022-23 session.

== Passage ==
The act was introduced to the House of Commons on 15 June 2022 by Wera Hobhouse and passed third reading in the Commons unopposed on 3 February 2023. The act was then introduced by Baroness Burt of Solihull to the House of Lords on 6 February 2023.

The act however faced significant opposition to its provisions by several Lords, which resulted in original clause 1 being removed from the bill for the act and the threshold for sexual harassment protections being lowered, both in committee. The opposition of the Lords were eventually conceded to by the government and the act's sponsors, Hobhouse and Burt, which the Commons agreed with the Lords in their amendments on 20 October 2023.

The act received royal assent on 26 October 2023.
