= Protection from Sex-based Harassment in Public Act 2023 =

- Act of Parliament
- Parliament of the United Kingdom
- Long title: An Act to make provision about causing intentional harassment, alarm or distress to a person in public where the behaviour is done because of that person’s sex; and for connected purposes.
- Citation: 2023 c. 47
- Introduced by: Greg Clark (Commons); David Wolfson (Lords)
- Territorial extent: England and Wales

Dates
- Royal assent: 18 September 2023
Other legislation
Amends	Football Spectators Act 1989; Police Act 1997; Elections Act 2022

Status: Not yet in force

History of passage through Parliament

Text of statute as originally enacted

The Protection from Sex-based Harassment in Public Act 2023 (c. 47) is an act of the United Kingdom House of Commons tabled as a private member's bill by Conservative MP Greg Clark. The Act came into force on April 1, 2026. The legislation makes acts of street harassment a criminal offence in England and Wales.

== Overview ==
The legislation makes street incidents of harassment, such as catcalling, following someone, or intentionally blocking their path, a criminal offence in England and Wales, with a punishment of up to two years in prison. The legislation is aimed at protecting women and girls in the wake of high-profile incidents such as the murders of Sarah Everard and Sabina Nessa, but will apply equally to women and men experiencing street harassment.

== History ==
The Protection from Sex-based Harassment in Public Bill was first brought to Parliament by Greg Clark, the MP for Tunbridge Wells, as a private member's bill on 15 June 2022, and received the support of the UK Government. It received its second reading on 9 December 2022, and passed through the Committee stage on 28 February 2023. On 24 March 2023, MPs voted to back the bill, and it was then sent to the House of Lords for further consideration.

== Reaction ==
The effort to tackle sex-based street harassment has been welcomed by women's campaign groups. Speaking in December 2022, Andrea Simon, the director of the End Violence Against Women Coalition, praised moves to address the issue, but added there were "concerns that a justice system that is already so badly broken won't be able to implement any new law".

Although the bill passed the vote unopposed, Christopher Chope, the Conservative MP for Christchurch, warned of a potential impact on the mental health of young men:

"There is a lack of recognition that, as with all crimes, the proportion of perpetrators is vanishingly small, the awful behaviour of few is leading to the mistreatment of all. The consequences of all this, and let's be extremely careful with language that we use, is that the situation which is already bad in relation to the mental health issues of boys and young men is going to get even worse".
