= Green Energy (Definition and Promotion) Act 2009 =

Act of the Parliament of the United Kingdom

- Act of Parliament
- Parliament of the United Kingdom
- Long title: An Act to define the term "green energy"; to promote its development, installation and usage; and for connected purposes.
- Citation: 2009 c. 19
- Introduced by: Peter Ainsworth MP (Commons); Lord Whitty (Lords)
- Territorial extent: England and Wales

Dates
- Royal assent: 12 November 2009
- Commencement: 12 January 2010

History of passage through Parliament

Text of statute as originally enacted

Revised text of statute as amended

The Green Energy (Definition and Promotion) Act 2009 (c. 19) is an act of the Parliament of the United Kingdom. The act is intended to reduce carbon emissions in England and Wales in order to reduce climate change, to increase the diversity and security of energy supplies, to reduce fuel poverty, and to contribute to meeting the EU 2020 renewable energy targets.

== Purpose ==
The aim of the bill was to remove alleged barriers to support small-scale renewable energy production.

== Provisions ==
The act removes the need for planning permission for installations for domestic premises.

=== Definition and promotion of green energy ===
Sections 1(2) and (3) define the expression "green energy" for the purposes of this act, the definition given being:

(a) the generation of electricity or heat from renewable or low-carbon sources by the use of any equipment, the capacity of which to generate electricity or heat does not exceed the capacity specified in subsection (3); and
(b) energy efficiency measures.

The relevant capacities were listed as 5 megawatts for electricity generation and 5 megawatts thermal for the generation of heat.

=== Microgeneration ===
These act makes provision for the promotion of microgeneration and the development of a microgeneration strategy with the existing microgeneration strategy being required to be updated to focus on the existing housing stock. The microgeneration strategy was published in March 2006.

== Commencement ==
Section 6(2) provides that the act came into force at the end of the period of two months that began on the day that it was passed. The word "months" means calendar months. The day (that is to say, 12 November 2009) on which the act was passed (that is to say, received royal assent) is included in the period of two months. This means that the act came into force on 12 January 2010.
