= Carers' rights =

Carers' rights are rights of unpaid carers or caregivers to public recognition and assistance in preventing and alleviating problems arising from caring for relatives or friends with disabilities. The carers' rights movement draws attention to issues of low income, social exclusion, damage to mental and physical health identified by research into unpaid caregiving. In social policy and campaigning the movement distinguishes such people's situation from that of paid careworkers, who in most developed countries have the benefit of legal employment protection and rights at work. With an increasingly ageing population in all developed societies, the role of carer has been increasingly recognized as an important one, both functionally and economically. Many organizations which provide support for persons with disabilities have developed various forms of support for carers/caregivers as well.

Unpaid carers are also referred to as "voluntary caregivers" or "informal carers"; classifications which have been criticized as a misnomer since caring for a relative or friend is normally neither voluntary nor informal. An accepted definition of a carer is, "Someone whose life is in some way restricted by the need to be responsible for the care of someone who is mentally ill, mentally handicapped, physically disabled or whose health is impaired by sickness or old age." Carers UK defines carers as people who "provide unpaid care by looking after an ill, frail or disabled family member, friend or partner". Around half of all carers are effectively excluded from paid employment through the heavy demands and responsibilities of caring for a vulnerable relative or friend. Their work has huge economic and social impact, being valued at over £87 billion in the UK alone.

== International organizations ==
On February 27, 2004, the International Alliance of Carers Organizations (IACO) was launched by family caregiving organizations from Australia, the UK, Sweden, the Netherlands, and the U.S. The mission of the organization is threefold:

- to increase visibility of family caregiving across the lifespan as an international issue;
- to promote the sharing of best practices in caregiving programs between countries; and
- to encourage and provide assistance to countries interested in developing family carer organizations.

IACO is headquartered in London. Initial IACO projects included promotion of a United Nations Day for Carers and a presentation on the IACO as part of a half-day workshop at the International Federation on Ageing conference in Singapore on August 4, 2004. National family carer organizations in all countries are encouraged to join the alliance.

== Australia ==
Australia has a population of over 22 million people. Of these 2.5 million are carers.

In Australia, carers are defined as people, usually family members, who provide support to children or adults who have a disability, mental health problem, chronic condition, who are frail aged or have drug or alcohol dependencies. Carers can be parents, partners, brothers, sisters, friends or children of any age. They may care for a few hours a week or all day every day. In Australia, many carers are eligible for government benefits, while others are employed or have a private income.

Carers in Australia receive recognition and support in a number of ways:

- Each of the six states and two territories have a non-government, non-profit organisation that advocates on behalf of carers through the Network of Carers Associations. They also provide information and support programs for carers.
- The Australian Government has supported carers since 1983 by providing carer income support and later pensions.
- Australian governments at all levels provide funding for carer-specific programs including carer support groups, respite, counselling for carers and in-home care for the person being cared for. Other programs assist specific groups of carers like young carers and ageing parent carers of adult children. Parent carers of children with disabilities have received financial support since 1998.
- In October 2010, the Australian Parliament passed the Carer Recognition Act. For an analysis of the legislation, visit the Australian Parliamentary Library's Bills Digest.
- Many states have carer recognition laws mandating the consideration of carers in all state policy. New South Wales, for instance, enacted the Carers (Recognition) Act in May 2010.
- Carers Australia, as part of its support for young people established the Australian National Young Carers Action Team (ANYCAT) in 2007, and following the formation held the "BringIT" conference in 2008.
- Carers Queensland started its "Young Carers Action Committee" in October 2009, however at its first formal meeting in November 2009 the members changed its name to "Young Carers Action Board Queensland" (YCABQ) – however some board members had reservations over the use of its initials believing that some people may get it confused with Yellow Cabs.
- In the latter part of 2010 the Australian Government conducted consultations with the Australian community to formulate a National Carer Strategy which was released in August 2011 and formally acknowledges the vital role of carers. The National Carer Recognition legislation and the National Carer Strategy forms part of the Government's response to the 2009 inquiry into better support for carers. See below.
- During the latter part of 2011, the Australian Government Productivity Commission finalised two reports of interest to carers in Australia – Caring for older Australians and the Disability care and support report. Anticipation is now building as the community prepares for aged care and disability reform in Australia.

=== The future for carers in Australia ===
Australia has one of the lowest population densities in the world. It has a land mass the size of the United States of America, but a population which is a fraction of the size. Providing services to carers in remote locations continues to beset the carer community in Australia. Many Aboriginal and Torres Strait Islander (ATSI) carers and culturally diverse carers have poor access to carer support services. The remoteness of many Aboriginal communities and their cultural approach to caring plays a part in low access rates to these services. Carer advocates work to try to address this situation.

In May 2009, the Australian Government completed an inquiry into better support for carers leading to the expectation that more will be achieved for carers in the future. It initiated a feasibility study into a national social insurance scheme to replace an inadequate network of existing support for people living with disability and their carers. The draft report was completed in early 2011. National carer recognition legislation was introduced into the Australian Parliament in March 2010 and passed after the national elections in August 2010. Schedule 1 of the legislation contains The Statement for Australia's Carers.

Caring is now seen as a community responsibility in Australia as evidenced by the comments of those surveyed on the issue. The formerly private world of carers is becoming a public concern as Australia, like other ageing populations, feels a shortage of carers. Further information on Australia's carers can be found at the websites of Carers Australia and Carers NSW.

== Europe ==
EUROFAMCARE aims to provide a European review of the situation of family carers of elderly people in relation to the existence, familiarity, availability, use and acceptability of supporting services. In 2003 six countries (Germany, Greece, Italy, Poland, Sweden, United Kingdom) formed a trans-European group, systematically representing the different types of welfare-states in Europe and started a comparative study. The Pan-European Group consists of 23 countries (including the six countries, which are represented by the members of the Consortium).

The last step is a feedback research action phase based both on the study results and on the pan-European expertise. A European Carers' Charter in progress will be further developed by the new European network organization EUROCARERS in order to stimulate further activities both on national and European policy levels.

EUROCARERS was formally launched in June 2007 to provide a united voice at European level and influence policy both nationally and within the European Union. Eurocarers currently comprises representatives of 18 organisations and research bodies from nine countries. Members have come together to influence policy within the European Institutions to ensure that the invaluable contribution of carers is recognised across Europe.

=== Finland ===
There are over 300,000 (estimate) family carers in Finland

- Of them some 29,000 receive family carer's allowance from their respective municipalities under The Act on Family Caregiving
- The municipality may arrange various social and healthcare services to backup family caring. The main types of services are home help and home nursing; meals on wheels; rehabilitation, short-term care etc.
- The law ensures a minimum caregiver allowance of EUR 310.Caregivers in heavy caring situations will receive a minimum of EUR 620 a month (taxable).
- Time off for the carer: at least 3 days / month
- When the carer is continuously or with only minor interruptions tied up to caring.
- The Municipality has to ensure that the care for the care recipient is appropriate during the family carer's time-off. Taking days-off or recreational time do not reduce the amount of family carer allowance.

== United Kingdom ==
According to Carers UK, and based on the 2011 census around 6.5 million people in the UK provide care on an unpaid basis for a relative, friend or neighbour in need of support due to old age, disability, frailty or illness. The population of carers is dynamic: at least a third of all people will fulfil a caring role at some point in their lives.

Research has shown that becoming a carer can have many impacts on a person's life. These include financial costs, exclusion and discrimination at work, social isolation and poor health through stress and physical injury.

At least half of all carers are in full or part-time employment and some care for more than one person. Carers save the UK economy an estimated £119 billion per year, and economic considerations form a key element in government policy to support carers.

The importance given to carers rights and legislation is evidenced by the record of parliamentary speeches, with 4,118 debates including some mention of carers at the end of March 2008.

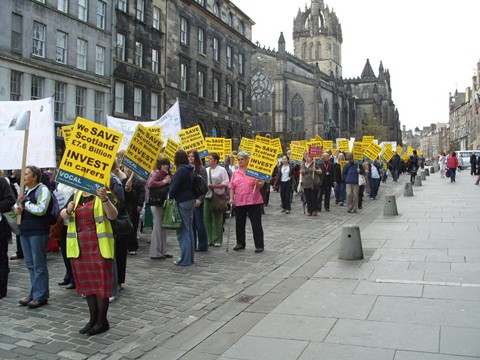
Scottish carers march down the Royal Mile to Holyrood

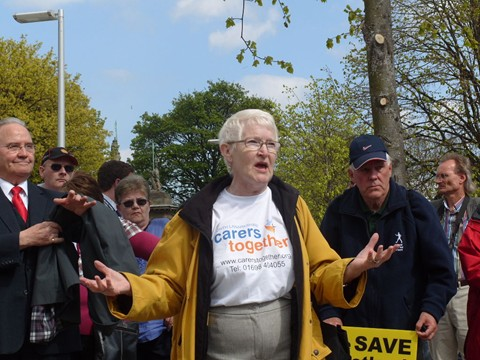
Carers speakers outside the Scottish Parliament

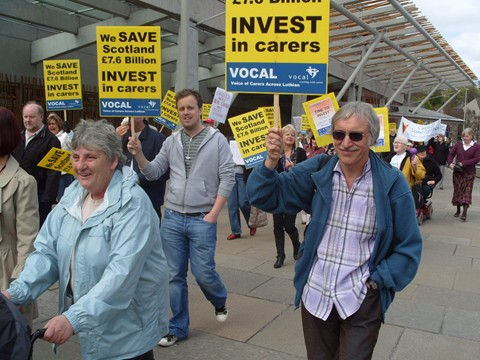
Carers arrive at the Scottish Parliament

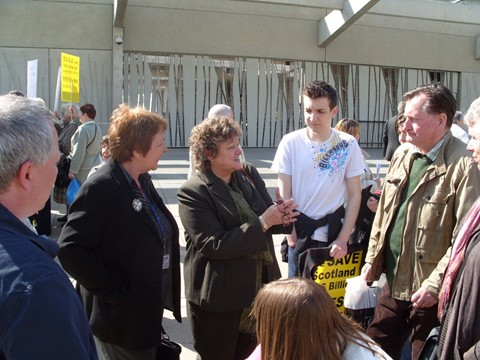
Cathie Craigie MSP and Cathy Peattie MSP talk to carers.

On 22 April 2009, carers took to the streets of London and Edinburgh for the first time to complain about poverty and seek improvements in welfare benefits and respite care. Around 400 carers took part altogether, presenting a 3000 signature petition to No 10 Downing St, and lobbying MP's MSP's and government ministers.

=== History and legislation ===
Since the 1950s, UK carers have become increasingly well organized in seeking recognition, improved social care services and human rights.

In 1965 the National Council for the Single Woman and her Dependants was formed following a letter to The Times newspaper by a carer, the Reverend Mary Webster, concerning the difficulties that confronted single women when they faced the complex task of earning the family living and caring for the home, the sick and the elderly. She began writing to newspapers, journals, MPs and peers drawing attention to the isolation and financial hardship that women carers were suffering. Her letters received a huge response from hundreds of women in similar situations.

Baroness Seear, then a lecturer in the London School of Economics was an early supporter. Due to her intervention, a meeting was held in the Grand Committee Room of the House of Commons. As a result of this meeting, The National Council for the Single Woman and Her Dependants was born, and the carers movement can be said to have begun. Early supporters and fundraisers included Sir Keith Joseph, MP.

During the 1960s and 70's The National Council for the Single Woman and Her Dependants won tax concessions and pension credits for women obliged to give up work to care. In 1971 the Attendance Allowance was brought in for those needing constant care at home.

In 1976 Invalid Care Allowance was introduced – the first benefit for carers and still the only benefit specifically for carers. It was renamed Carer's Allowance in April 2003. It is officially described as “a non-contributory, non means-tested, income-maintenance benefit, not intended to be a wage for caring, nor a payment for the services of caring.”

1978 saw the introduction of Home Responsibilities Protection to protect carers' basic state pension.

In 1981 the UK Association of Carers was formed by Judith Oliver, Sandra Leventon and others, aided by a grant of £9,879 from the Equal Opportunities Commission. It was initially refused registration as a charity, as helping carers was not at that time regarded as a proper charitable object by the Charities Commission, finally being registered in 1984. The group campaigned fiercely for Invalid Care Allowance to be extended to married women. Following a test case brought to the European Court on behalf of Jackie Drake, in June 1986 the government capitulated.

In 1982 The National Council for the Single Woman and Her Dependants was renamed "The National Council for Carers and their Elderly Dependants" in an attempt to be more inclusive and gain ground lost to other carers groups. They had opposed the extension of ICA probably because of reports that Norman Fowler had said that he would abolish ICA rather than extend it. Carers National Association was formed by the merger of the two existing voluntary organizations on May 14, 1988, and was renamed Carers UK in 2001.

==== Carers (Recognition and Services) Act 1995 ====
The Carers (Recognition and Services) Act 1995 was the first piece of UK legislation which formally recognised the role of unpaid carers and provides for the assessment of the ability of carers to provide care.

==== Carers and Disabled Children Act 2000 ====
The Carers and Disabled Children Act 2000, which does not cover Scotland, makes provision about the assessment of carers' needs; to provide for services to help carers; to provide for the making of payments to carers and disabled children aged 16 or 17 in lieu of the provision of services to them and for connected purposes.

==== Carers (Equal Opportunities) Act 2004 ====
The Carers (Equal Opportunities) Act 2004 came into force in England on 1 April 2005, and in Wales on 18 April 2005.

The act gives carers new rights to information – section 1 of the act places a duty on local authorities to inform carers of their right to a Carers Assessment. Ensures that work, lifelong learning and leisure are considered when a carer is assessed – section 2 means that when a Carer's Assessment is being completed it must take into account whether the carer works or wishes to work, any courses the carer is taking or wishes to take, and any other leisure activities the carer undertakes or wishes to undertake. Gives local authorities new powers to gain the help of housing, health, education and other local authorities in providing support to carers – Section 3 states that if the local authority requests another authority to plan services, that authority must give that request due consideration.

Government legislation affecting the care of children with disabilities includes:

- Special Educational Needs and Disability Act 2001
- Children Act 1989
- Convention on the Rights of the Child

==== Work and Families Act 2006 ====
The Work and Families Act 2006, which came into force in England in October 2006, makes provision for improved maternity and adoption leave for women. It also extends the right to request flexible working for Carers.

==== Care Act 2014 ====
The Care Act 2014, which received royal assent on 14 May 2014, and came into effect on 1 April 2015, strengthens the rights and recognition of carers in the social care system; including, for the first time, giving carers a clear right to receive services, even if the person they care for does not receive local authority funding. These are by far the strongest rights for carers yet.

Part 1 of the new act consolidates and modernises the framework of social care law.

The Care Act 2014 brings those funding their own care into the care system with obligations on local authorities relating to information and advice, universal services, assessments and market shaping among others all applying to self-funders. It also sets out a new model of paying for care, putting in place a cap on the care costs which an individual is liable for.

==== Carer's Leave Act 2023 ====
Carer's Leave Act 2023
- Act of Parliament
- Parliament of the United Kingdom
- Long title: An Act to make provision about unpaid leave for employees with caring responsibilities.
- Citation: 2023 c. 18
- Introduced by: Wendy Chamberlain (Commons); Lord Fox (Lords)
- Territorial extent: England and Wales; Scotland; Northern Ireland

Dates
- Royal assent: 24 May 2023
- Commencement: 4 December 2023

Status: Current legislation

History of passage through Parliament

Text of statute as originally enacted

Text of the Carer's Leave Act 2023 as in force today (including any amendments) within the United Kingdom, from legislation.gov.uk.

The Carer's Leave Bill was introduced into the House of Commons in September 2022 by Wendy Chamberlain MP. It was supported by the government and passed as the Carer's Leave Act 2023 (c. 18) on 24 May 2023.

It gives a new right for UK employees with caring responsibilities to have up to one week of unpaid Carer's Leave each year. About 2.4 million employees are estimated to be eligible.

=== Scotland ===
Policy and legislation in relation to caregivers living in Scotland is somewhat different from that in England, Wales and Ireland. Carers are defined by the Scottish Census as being "individuals who look after, or give any help or support to family members, friends, neighbours and others because of long-term physical or mental ill health or disability or problems related to old age" (Scotland's Census Results Online [SCROL]. Estimates from the 2001 census put the numbers of carers in Scotland at 481,579. Of these, 175,969 are reported to provide more than 20 hours of care a week, and 24% provide more than 50 hours of care.

Carers who provide care for 20 hours a week or more are regarded as at the 'heavy end' of caring (Parker 1990). This assumes that they are the most involved carers, providing both personal and physical care, resulting in high levels of stress and most in need of support services. Many of these carers however, continue to provide care without support from social work or health services and because of this they remain hidden or invisible (Scottish Executive 2006, Cavaye 2006).

Carers are viewed by the government as an important resource and in recent years have been given increasing recognition in health and social care policy. Since devolution in 1999 legislation and policy for caregivers has been developed by the former Scottish Executive (now Scottish Government).

Carers in Scotland are regarded as 'partners' in the provision of care. As a result, support services provided to carers are regarded as part of the overall package of care to the person being looked after. This means that carers are not seen as service users and are therefore not responsible for the cost of any service provided. The exception to this is when a carer is looking after their partner; in that situation their income may be taken into account during a financial assessment.

This situation is different from that which exists in England where carers are viewed as services users in their own right and as such are liable for the cost of services provided. Yet, in many cases, it is not the carer who actually needs the service; it is the person being cared for who needs it because of their illness or disability.

==== Legislation ====
Strategy for Carers in Scotland 1999 This was a package of measures put in place by the Scottish Executive (became The Scottish Government in 2007) after devolution in 1999. The aim was to commit resources in order to improve service provision for carers. The Strategy comprised three elements: information, support and care for carers. Central to the Strategy was a number of assumptions including a carer's right to choose to care, to be adequately prepared to do so, to receive relevant help at an appropriate stage, and to be enabled to care without it adversely affecting their health or inclusion in society. An important aspect of the Strategy was its emphasis on the provision of services for carers in their own right. This issue built on the provisions of the 1995 Carers (Services and Recognition) Act, which accorded carers the right to an assessment of their needs only if the person they were caring for was being assessed. This measure however, limited carers entitlement to services, undervalued their role and their needs.

Community Care and Health Scotland Act 2002 This legislation introduced new rights for carers in Scotland. The Act made provision for the right to a carer's assessment which was independent of the person being cared for. It also placed a duty on local authorities and the NHS to inform carers of their rights. Local authorities are also required to recognise the care being provided by a carer and to take into account the views of a carer when deciding what services to offer to the person being cared for. Underpinning this legislation is the principle that informal unpaid family carers are to be treated as 'key partners' in providing care.

The other important policy introduced by this legislation which impacts upon carers is that of Free Personal and Nursing Care for Older People. This policy is unique to Scotland. The definition of personal care contained within the Act does not include 'board and lodging' or 'hotel' costs. The definition is mainly based on the one used by the Royal Commission on Long Term Care (1999) except that it takes account of the needs arising from cognitive impairment and behavioural problems as well as physical frailty. Thus the definition of is different from that used by social services in England. The definition is important because it is used as a basis for community care assessments and describes the range of tasks that might be undertaken by home carers employed by social work departments. It is also an accurate reflection of the activities undertaken by informal, unpaid family carers. This policy has been found to be very effective in supporting carers to continue providing care for longer and the researchers found that the volume of care being provided at home had actually increased in recent years (Bell & Bowes 2006)

== United States ==
The National Family Caregivers Association was founded in 1993. According to the United States National Family Caregivers Association, "more than 50 million people provide care for a chronically ill, disabled or aged family member or friend during any given year." The vast majority of these are unpaid caregivers.

== South America ==
=== Chile ===
Over a million people in Chile are involved in caregiving work. In 2026, the law called "Chile Takes Care" (Spanish: Chile Cuida) went into effect, creating a National System of Support and Care meant to gurantee rights both to those dependent on carers and carers themselves. Part of this new law involves the right to caregiver identification from the Ministry of Social Development and Family's Social Household Registry, which provides benefits to carers and recognizes their labor.

== See also ==
- Caregiver
