= Shark Fins Act 2023 =

Act of the Parliament of the United Kingdom

Shark Fins Act 2023 (Note: Section 3(6).)
- Act of Parliament
- Parliament of the United Kingdom
- Long title: An Act to prohibit the import and export of shark fins and to make provision relating to the removal of fins from sharks.
- Citation: 2023 c. 22
- Introduced by: Christina Rees (Commons); Baroness Jones of Whitchurch (Lords)
- Territorial extent: England and Wales; Scotland; Northern Ireland; (Note: Section 3(1).)

Dates
- Royal assent: 29 June 2023
- Commencement: 29 June 2023 (section 3); 29 August 2023 (section 2); section 1 not in force; (Note: Section 3(2)–(5).)
Other legislation
Amends	Council Regulation (EC) No 1185/2003

Status: Current legislation

History of passage through Parliament

Text of statute as originally enacted

Revised text of statute as amended

The Shark Fins Act 2023 (c. 22) is an act of the Parliament of the United Kingdom designed to ban the import and export of shark fins. Prior to legislation, the practice of shark finning has been banned in the United Kingdom in 2003, and in 2009 the "fins naturally attached (FNA)" policy has been enforced to combat illegal shark finning in UK waters, as well as UK vessels worldwide.

There are 512 species of sharks, 143 are listed as near threatened under the IUCN, with different species ranging from vulnerable to critically endangered sharks.

== Provisions ==
In 2003, the United Kingdom (then part of the European Union) banned practice of shark finning under Regulation (EC) No. 1185/2003.

In 2009, the "fins naturally attached" policy has been adopted in the United Kingdom.

== See also ==
- Shark Finning Prohibition Act – Similar US legislation
