= International Development (Official Development Assistance Target) Act 2015 =

- Act of Parliament
- Parliament of the United Kingdom
- Long title: An Act to make provision about the meeting by the United Kingdom of the target for official development assistance (ODA) to constitute 0.7 per cent of gross national income; to make provision for independent verification that ODA is spent efficiently and effectively; and for connected purposes.
- Citation: 2015 c. 12
- Introduced by: Michael Moore (Commons); Jeremy Purvis (Lords)
- Territorial extent: United Kingdom

Dates
- Royal assent: 26 March 2015
- Commencement: 1 June 2015

Status: Current legislation

Text of the International Development (Official Development Assistance Target) Act 2015 as in force today (including any amendments) within the United Kingdom, from legislation.gov.uk.

The International Development (Official Development Assistance Target) Act 2015 is an Act of Parliament in the United Kingdom.

== Background ==
In 1970, the United Nations set a target for donor countries to spend 0.7% of their gross national income (GNI) on official development assistance (ODA). ODA is aid intended to promote the economic development and welfare of developing countries.

In 2004, the then-Labour government said it intended to reach the target by 2013. This position was endorsed by the Conservative-Liberal Democrat government in 2010. Both Labour and Coalition governments also announced that they would bring forward their own legislation to enshrine the target in law but did not do so.

Before the Act, 2006 legislation required the government to report on progress towards the 0.7% target but did not mandate it be met.

The Act was a private member's bill introduced by Michael Moore in the House of Commons and Lord Purvis in the House of Lords. The bill had its first reading on 2 July 2014 and its second on 12 September 2014. A similar bill was previously introduced by Mark Hendrick but ran out of time in 2013.

== Provisions ==
The Act states the government must spend 0.7% of GNI on ODA in every calendar year from 2015. The OECD definition of ODA is applied.

Section 2 of the Act states that the Secretary of State must, once an annual report laid before Parliament shows that the 0.7% target has not been met in the report year, provide an explanatory statement for the shortfall. The only accountability mechanism in the event the target is not met is the making of a report to Parliament.
