= List of statutory rules of Northern Ireland, 2004 =

This is an incomplete list of statutory rules of Northern Ireland in 2004.

== 1-100 ==
- Police (Recruitment) (Northern Ireland) (Amendment) Regulations 2004 (S.R. 2004 No. 1)
- Police Reserve Trainee Regulations (Northern Ireland) 2004 (S.R. 2004 No. 2)
- Police Service of Northern Ireland Reserve (Part-Time) Regulations 2004 (S.R. 2004 No. 3)
- Prison and Young Offenders Centre (Amendment) Rules (Northern Ireland) 2004 (S.R. 2004 No. 4)
- Dismissal Procedures Agreement Designation 1981 (Revocation) Order (Northern Ireland) 2004 (S.R. 2004 No. 6)
- Collagen and Gelatine (Intra-Community Trade) Regulations (Northern Ireland) 2004 (S.R. 2004 No. 7)
- Housing Renewal Grants (Reduction of Grant) Regulations (Northern Ireland) 2004 (S.R. 2004 No. 8)
- Meat Products Regulations (Northern Ireland) 2004 (S.R. 2004 No. 13)
- Social Security (Child Maintenance Premium) (Amendment) Regulations (Northern Ireland) 2004 (S.R. 2004 No. 16)
- Social Security (Hospital In-Patients) (Amendment) Regulations (Northern Ireland) 2004 (S.R. 2004 No. 18)
- Taxis (Newtownards) (Amendment) Bye-Laws (Northern Ireland) 2004 (S.R. 2004 No. 19)
- Salaries (Comptroller and Auditor General) Order (Northern Ireland) 2004 (S.R. 2004 No. 20)
- Companies (Investment Companies) (Distribution of Profits) Regulations (Northern Ireland) 2004 (S.R. 2004 No. 22)
- Unsolicited Goods and Services (Electronic Communications) Order (Northern Ireland) 2004 (S.R. 2004 No. 23)
- Rates (Regional Rates) Order (Northern Ireland) 2004 (S.R. 2004 No. 24)
- Taxis (Warrenpoint) Bye-Laws (Northern Ireland) 2004 (S.R. 2004 No. 25)
- Food (Hot Chilli and Hot Chilli Products) (Emergency Control) (Amendment) Regulations (Northern Ireland) 2004 (S.R. 2004 No. 26)
- Superannuation (Economic Research Institute of Northern Ireland Limited) Order (Northern Ireland) 2004 (S.R. 2004 No. 27)
- Superannuation (Office of the Commissioner for Children and Young People for Northern Ireland) Order (Northern Ireland) 2004 (S.R. 2004 No. 28)
- Superannuation (Civilian Direct Recruits to the Police Service of Northern Ireland) Order (Northern Ireland) 2004 (S.R. 2004 No. 29)
- Motor Vehicles (Approval) (Amendment) Regulations (Northern Ireland) 2004 (S.R. 2004 No. 30)
- Police Service of Northern Ireland Pensions (Additional Voluntary Contributions) (Amendment) Regulations 2004 (S.R. 2004 No. 31)
- Novel Foods and Novel Food Ingredients Regulations (Northern Ireland) 2004 (S.R. 2004 No. 33)
- Motorways Traffic (Amendment) Regulations (Northern Ireland) 2004 (S.R. 2004 No. 34)
- Waste Incineration (Amendment) Regulations (Northern Ireland) 2004 (S.R. 2004 No. 35)
- Solvent Emissions Regulations (Northern Ireland) 2004 (S.R. 2004 No. 36)
- Regulation and Improvement Authority (Appointments and Procedure) Regulations (Northern Ireland) 2004 (S.R. 2004 No. 37)
- General Teaching Council for Northern Ireland (Registration of Teachers) Regulations (Northern Ireland) 2004 (S.R. 2004 No. 38)
- Registered Rents (Increase) Order (Northern Ireland) 2004 (S.R. 2004 No. 42)
- Motor Vehicles (Construction and Use) (Amendment) Regulations (Northern Ireland) 2004 (S.R. 2004 No. 44)
- Social Security (Miscellaneous Amendments) Regulations (Northern Ireland) 2004 (S.R. 2004 No. 45)
- Housing Benefit (State Pension Credit and Miscellaneous Amendments) Regulations (Northern Ireland) 2004 (S.R. 2004 No. 46)
- Housing Benefit (Miscellaneous Amendments) Regulations (Northern Ireland) 2004 (S.R. 2004 No. 47)
- Motor Vehicles (Construction and Use) (Amendment No. 2) Regulations (Northern Ireland) 2004 (S.R. 2004 No. 48)
- Local Government (Constituting a Joint Committee a Body Corporate) Order (Northern Ireland) 2004 (S.R. 2004 No. 49)
- Disability Discrimination Code of Practice (Goods, Facilities, Services and Premises) (Appointed Day) Order (Northern Ireland) 2004 (S.R. 2004 No. 50)
- Disability Discrimination Act 1995 (Amendment) Regulations (Northern Ireland) 2004 (S.R. 2004 No. 55)
- Northern Ireland Social Care Council (Description of social care workers) Order (Northern Ireland) 2004 (S.R. 2004 No. 56)
- Northern Ireland Social Care Council (Description of persons to be treated as social care workers) Regulations (Northern Ireland) 2004 (S.R. 2004 No. 57)
- Dairy Produce Quotas (Amendment) Regulations (Northern Ireland) 2004 (S.R. 2004 No. 59)
- Occupational Pension Schemes (Winding Up and Deficiency on Winding Up, etc.) (Amendment) Regulations (Northern Ireland) 2004 (S.R. 2004 No. 60)
- Emergency Grants (Eligible Tenants) Order (Northern Ireland) 2004 (S.R. 2004 No. 61)
- Northern Ireland Medical and Dental Training Agency (Establishment and Constitution) Order (Northern Ireland) 2004 (S.R. 2004 No. 62)
- Gas Safety (Installation and Use) Regulations (Northern Ireland) 2004 (S.R. 2004 No. 63)
- Employment Rights (Increase of Limits) Order (Northern Ireland) 2004 (S.R. 2004 No. 64)
- Motor Vehicles (Approval) (Fees) Regulations (Northern Ireland) 2004 (S.R. 2004 No. 65)
- Motor Vehicles (Construction and Use) (Amendment No. 3) Regulations (Northern Ireland) 2004 (S.R. 2004 No. 67)
- Administration of Estates (Small Payments) (Increase of Limit) Order (Northern Ireland) 2004 (S.R. 2004 No. 68)
- Seed Potatoes Marketing Board Assets (Revocation) Order (Northern Ireland) 2004 (S.R. 2004 No. 69)
- Seed Potatoes (Levy) (Amendment) Order (Northern Ireland) 2004 (S.R. 2004 No. 70)
- Energy (2003 Order) (Commencement No. 2) Order (Northern Ireland) 2004 (S.R. 2004 No. 71)
- Income Support (General) (Standard Interest Rate Amendment) Regulations (Northern Ireland) 2004 (S.R. 2004 No. 72)
- Litter (Fixed Penalty) Order (Northern Ireland) 2004 (S.R. 2004 No. 73)
- Fisheries (Amendment) Byelaws (Northern Ireland) 2004 (S.R. 2004 No. 74)
- Foyle Area and Carlingford Area (Angling) (Amendment) Regulations 2004 (S.R. 2004 No. 75)
- Marketing and Use of Dangerous Substances Regulations (Northern Ireland) 2004 (S.R. 2004 No. 76)
- Pharmacy (Northern Ireland) Order 1976 (Amendment) Order (Northern Ireland) 2004 (S.R. 2004 No. 78)
- Guaranteed Minimum Pensions Increase Order (Northern Ireland) 2004 (S.R. 2004 No. 79)
- Social Security Pensions (Low Earnings Threshold) Order (Northern Ireland) 2004 (S.R. 2004 No. 80)
- Social Security Revaluation of Earnings Factors Order (Northern Ireland) 2004 (S.R. 2004 No. 81)
- Social Security Benefits Up-rating Order (Northern Ireland) 2004 (S.R. 2004 No. 82)
- Social Security Benefits Up-rating Regulations (Northern Ireland) 2004 (S.R. 2004 No. 83)
- Social Security (Industrial Injuries) (Dependency) (Permitted Earnings Limits) Order (Northern Ireland) 2004 (S.R. 2004 No. 84)
- Social Security (Claims and Payments) (Amendment) Regulations (Northern Ireland) 2004 (S.R. 2004 No. 85)
- Legal Aid (Financial Conditions) Regulations (Northern Ireland) 2004 (S.R. 2004 No. 86)
- Legal Advice and Assistance (Amendment) Regulations (Northern Ireland) 2004 (S.R. 2004 No. 87)
- Legal Advice and Assistance (Financial Conditions) Regulations (Northern Ireland) 2004 (S.R. 2004 No. 88)
- Road Traffic (Health Services Charges) (Amendment) Regulations (Northern Ireland) 2004 (S.R. 2004 No. 89)
- Travelling Expenses and Remission of Charges Regulations (Northern Ireland) 2004 (S.R. 2004 No. 91)
- Optical Charges and Payments and General Ophthalmic Services (Amendment) Regulations (Northern Ireland) 2004 (S.R. 2004 No. 92)
- Dental Charges (Amendment) Regulations (Northern Ireland) 2004 (S.R. 2004 No. 93)
- Charges for Drugs and Appliances (Amendment) Regulations (Northern Ireland) 2004 (S.R. 2004 No. 94)
- Food Safety (Ships and Aircraft) Order (Northern Ireland) 2004 (S.R. 2004 No. 99)
- Eel Fishing (Licence Duties) Regulations (Northern Ireland) 2004 (S.R. 2004 No. 100)

== 101-200 ==
- Workmen's Compensation (Supplementation) (Amendment) Regulations (Northern Ireland) 2004 (S.R. 2004 No. 101)
- Planning (Fees) (Amendment) Regulations (Northern Ireland) 2004 (S.R. 2004 No. 102)
- Health and Personal Social Services (Superannuation) (Amendment) Regulations (Northern Ireland) 2004 (S.R. 2004 No. 103)
- Health and Personal Social Services (Superannuation Scheme and Additional Voluntary Contributions) (Pension Sharing) (Amendment) Regulations (Northern Ireland) 2004 (S.R. 2004 No. 104)
- Food for Particular Nutritional Uses (Addition of Substances for Specific Nutritional Purposes) (Amendment) Regulations (Northern Ireland) 2004 (S.R. 2004 No. 105)
- Producer Responsibility Obligations (Packaging Waste) (Amendment) Regulations (Northern Ireland) 2004 (S.R. 2004 No. 106)
- Health and Personal Social Services (2001 Act) (Commencement No. 6) Order (Northern Ireland) 2004 (S.R. 2004 No. 107)
- Rules of the Supreme Court (Northern Ireland) (Amendment) 2004 (S.R. 2004 No. 108)
- Fisheries and Aquaculture Structures (Grants) (Amendment) Regulations (Northern Ireland) 2004 (S.R. 2004 No. 109)
- State Pension Credit (Miscellaneous Amendments) Regulations (Northern Ireland) 2004 (S.R. 2004 No. 110)
- Statutory Paternity Pay and Statutory Adoption Pay (Weekly Rates) (Amendment) Regulations (Northern Ireland) 2004 (S.R. 2004 No. 111)
- Optical Charges and Payments and General Ophthalmic Services (Amendment No. 2) Regulations (Northern Ireland) 2004 (S.R. 2004 No. 113)
- Police (Northern Ireland) Act 2000 (Renewal of Temporary Provisions) Order 2004 (S.R. 2004 No. 114)
- Natural Mineral Water, Spring Water and Bottled Drinking Water (Amendment) Regulations (Northern Ireland) 2004 (S.R. 2004 No. 115)
- Paternity and Adoption Leave (Amendment) Regulations (Northern Ireland) 2004 (S.R. 2004 No. 116)
- Pensions Increase (Review) Order (Northern Ireland) 2004 (S.R. 2004 No. 118)
- Carers and Direct Payments (2002 Act) (Commencement No. 2) Order (Northern Ireland) 2004 (S.R. 2004 No. 119)
- Personal Social Services and Children's Services (Direct Payments) Regulations (Northern Ireland) 2004 (S.R. 2004 No. 120)
- Health and Personal Social Services (Assessment of Resources) (Amendment) Regulations (Northern Ireland) 2004 (S.R. 2004 No. 121)
- Police Service of Northern Ireland (Secondment) (Garda Síochána) Regulations 2004 (S.R. 2004 No. 122)
- Primary Medical Services (2004 Order) (Commencement) Order (Northern Ireland) 2004 (S.R. 2004 No. 123)
- Pneumoconiosis, etc., (Workers' Compensation) (Payment of Claims) (Amendment) Regulations (Northern Ireland) 2004 (S.R. 2004 No. 124)
- Marketing and Use of Dangerous Substances (No. 2) Regulations (Northern Ireland) 2004 (S.R. 2004 No. 125)
- Plant Protection Products Regulations (Northern Ireland) 2004 (S.R. 2004 No. 126)
- Statutory Paternity Pay and Statutory Adoption Pay (Amendment) Regulations (Northern Ireland) 2004 (S.R. 2004 No. 132)
- Health Services (Primary Care) (1997 Order) (Commencement No. 4) Order (Northern Ireland) 2004 (S.R. 2004 No. 133)
- Local Government Pension Scheme (Amendment) Regulations (Northern Ireland) 2004 (S.R. 2004 No. 139)
- Health and Personal Social Services (General Medical Services Contracts) Regulations (Northern Ireland) 2004 (S.R. 2004 No. 140)
- General Medical Services Transitional and Consequential Provisions (No. 1) (Northern Ireland) Order 2004 (S.R. 2004 No. 141)
- Health and Personal Social Services (General Medical Services Contracts) (Prescription of Drugs Etc.) Regulations (Northern Ireland) 2004 (S.R. 2004 No. 142)
- Social Security (Miscellaneous Amendments No. 2) Regulations (Northern Ireland) 2004 (S.R. 2004 No. 143)
- Housing Benefit (Abolition of Benefit Periods Amendment) Regulations (Northern Ireland) 2004 (S.R. 2004 No. 144)
- Housing Benefit (Extended Payments (Severe Disablement Allowance and Incapacity Benefit) Amendment) Regulations (Northern Ireland) 2004 (S.R. 2004 No. 145)
- Breeding Flocks, Hatcheries and Animal By-Products (Fees) Order (Northern Ireland) 2004 (S.R. 2004 No. 146)
- Rates (Amendment) (2004 Order) (Commencement) Order (Northern Ireland) 2004 (S.R. 2004 No. 147)
- Taxis (Ballynahinch) Bye-Laws (Northern Ireland) 2004 (S.R. 2004 No. 148)
- Health and Personal Social Services (Primary Medical Services Performers Lists) Regulations (Northern Ireland) 2004 (S.R. 2004 No. 149)
- Employment (Northern Ireland) Order 2003 (Commencement and Transitional Provisions) Order (Northern Ireland) 2004 (S.R. 2004 No. 150)
- Non-IACS Farm Support (Review of Decisions) Regulations (Northern Ireland) 2004 (S.R. 2004 No. 151)
- Houses In Multiple Occupation (Registration Scheme Fees) Order (Northern Ireland) 2004 (S.R. 2004 No. 152)
- Non-Domestic Rating (Unoccupied Property) Regulations (Northern Ireland) 2004 (S.R. 2004 No. 153)
- Medicated Feedingstuffs (Amendment) Regulations (Northern Ireland) 2004 (S.R. 2004 No. 154)
- Feedingstuffs (Zootechnical Products) (Amendment) Regulations (Northern Ireland) 2004 (S.R. 2004 No. 155)
- General Medical Services Transitional and Consequential Provisions (No. 2) (Northern Ireland) Order 2004 (S.R. 2004 No. 156)
- Industrial Tribunals (Increase of Maximum Deposit) Order (Northern Ireland) 2004 (S.R. 2004 No. 157)
- Fair Employment Tribunal (Increase of Maximum Deposit) Order (Northern Ireland) 2004 (S.R. 2004 No. 158)
- The Welfare Foods (Amendment) Regulations (Northern Ireland) 2004 (S.R. 2004 No. 161)
- Travelling Expenses and Remission of Charges and Optical Charges and Payments and General Ophthalmic Services (Amendment) Regulations (Northern Ireland) 2004 (S.R. 2004 No. 162)
- Social Security (Income-Related Benefits Self-Employment Route Amendment) Regulations (Northern Ireland) 2004 (S.R. 2004 No. 163)
- Fair Employment Tribunal (Rules of Procedure) Regulations (Northern Ireland) 2004 (S.R. 2004 No. 164)
- Industrial Tribunals (Constitution and Rules of Procedure) Regulations (Northern Ireland) 2004 (S.R. 2004 No. 165)
- Jobseeker's Allowance (Amendment) Regulations (Northern Ireland) 2004 (S.R. 2004 No. 166)
- Legal Aid (Assessment of Resources) (Amendment) Regulations (Northern Ireland) 2004 (S.R. 2004 No. 167)
- Legal Advice and Assistance (Amendment No. 2) Regulations (Northern Ireland) 2004 (S.R. 2004 No. 168)
- Legal Advice and Assistance (Amendment No. 3) Regulations (Northern Ireland) 2004 (S.R. 2004 No. 169)
- Equal Pay Act 1970 (Amendment) Regulations (Northern Ireland) 2004 (S.R. 2004 No. 171)
- Sex Discrimination Order 1976 (Amendment) Regulations (Northern Ireland) 2004 (S.R. 2004 No. 172)
- Sea Fishing (Restriction on Days at Sea) Order (Northern Ireland) 2004 (S.R. 2004 No. 173)
- Motor Cars (Driving Instruction) Regulations (Northern Ireland) 2004 (S.R. 2004 No. 179)
- Legal Advice and Assistance (Amendment No. 4) Regulations (Northern Ireland) 2004 (S.R. 2004 No. 180)
- Seed Potatoes (Crop Fees) Regulations (Northern Ireland) 2004 (S.R. 2004 No. 181)
- Food (Jelly Confectionery) (Emergency Control) (Amendment) Regulations (Northern Ireland) 2004 (S.R. 2004 No. 182)
- Potatoes Originating in Egypt Regulations (Northern Ireland) 2004 (S.R. 2004 No. 183)
- Occupational Pension Schemes (Winding Up) (Amendment) Regulations (Northern Ireland) 2004 (S.R. 2004 No. 187)
- Optical Charges and Payments (Amendment) Regulations (Northern Ireland) 2004 (S.R. 2004 No. 188)
- Weighing Equipment (Filling and Discontinuous Totalising Automatic Weighing Machines) (Amendment) Regulations (Northern Ireland) 2004 (S.R. 2004 No. 189)
- Companies (1986 Order) (Accounts of Small and Medium-Sized Enterprises and Audit Exemption) (Amendment) Regulations (Northern Ireland) 2004 (S.R. 2004 No. 190)
- Non-Domestic Rating (Unoccupied Property) (Prescribed Information) Regulations (Northern Ireland) 2004 (S.R. 2004 No. 191)
- Rent Book Regulations (Northern Ireland) 2004 (S.R. 2004 No. 192)
- Lands Tribunal (Salaries) Order (Northern Ireland) 2004 (S.R. 2004 No. 194)
- Reporting of Injuries, Diseases and Dangerous Occurrences (Amendment) Regulations (Northern Ireland) 2004 (S.R. 2004 No. 196)
- Social Security (Habitual Residence Amendment) Regulations (Northern Ireland) 2004 (S.R. 2004 No. 197)
- Allocation of Housing Regulations (Northern Ireland) 2004 (S.R. 2004 No. 198)
- Homelessness Regulations (Northern Ireland) 2004 (S.R. 2004 No. 199)
- Pesticides (Maximum Residue Levels in Crops, Food and Feeding Stuffs) (Amendment) Regulations (Northern Ireland) 2004 (S.R. 2004 No. 200)

== 201-300 ==
- Magistrates' Courts (Sexual Offences Act 2003) Rules (Northern Ireland) 2004 (S.R. 2004 No. 203)
- Magistrates' Courts (Amendment) Rules (Northern Ireland) 2004 (S.R. 2004 No. 204)
- Food (Emergency Control) (Miscellaneous Amendments) Regulations (Northern Ireland) 2004 (S.R. 2004 No. 205)
- Seed Potatoes (Tuber and Label Fees) (Amendment) Regulations (Northern Ireland) 2004 (S.R. 2004 No. 207)
- Marketing of Potatoes (Amendment) Regulations (Northern Ireland) 2004 (S.R. 2004 No. 208)
- Welfare of Animals (Slaughter or Killing) (Amendment) Regulations (Northern Ireland) 2004 (S.R. 2004 No. 209)
- Restriction of Vehicles on Bridges Regulations (Northern Ireland) 2004 (S.R. 2004 No. 211)
- Restriction of Vehicles on Bridges Regulations (Northern Ireland) 2004 (S.R. 2004 No. 213)
- Pneumoconiosis, etc., (Workers' Compensation) (Payment of Claims) (Amendment No. 2) Regulations (Northern Ireland) 2004 (S.R. 2004 No. 214)
- Feeding Stuffs (Amendment) Regulations (Northern Ireland) 2004 (S.R. 2004 No. 215)
- County Court (Amendment) Rules (Northern Ireland) 2004 (S.R. 2004 No. 216)
- Education and Libraries (Exclusion of Non-commercial Considerations) Order (Northern Ireland) 2004 (S.R. 2004 No. 217)
- Police (Northern Ireland) Act 2000 (Designated Places of Detention) Order 2004 (S.R. 2004 No. 221)
- Pressure Systems Safety Regulations (Northern Ireland) 2004 (S.R. 2004 No. 222)
- Social Security (Crediting and Treatment of Contributions, and National Insurance Numbers) (Amendment) Regulations (Northern Ireland) 2004 (S.R. 2004 No. 223)
- Street Works (1995 Order) (Commencement No. 6) Order (Northern Ireland) 2004 (S.R. 2004 No. 227)
- Code of Practice (Time Off for Trade Union Duties and Activities) (Appointed Day) Order (Northern Ireland) 2004 (S.R. 2004 No. 230)
- Crown Court (Amendment) Rules (Northern Ireland) 2004 (S.R. 2004 No. 233)
- Whole of Government Accounts (Designation of Bodies) (Northern Ireland) Order 2004 (S.R. 2004 No. 234)
- Artificial Insemination (Sheep) (Revocation) Regulations (Northern Ireland) 2004 (S.R. 2004 No. 235)
- Pharmaceutical Society of Northern Ireland (General) (Amendment) Regulations (Northern Ireland) 2004 (S.R. 2004 No. 236)
- Oil and Fibre Plant Seeds (Amendment) Regulations (Northern Ireland) 2004 (S.R. 2004 No. 237)
- Work in Compressed Air Regulations (Northern Ireland) 2004 (S.R. 2004 No. 241)
- Level Crossing (Moira) Order (Northern Ireland) 2004 (S.R. 2004 No. 243)
- Level Crossing (Trummery) Order (Northern Ireland) 2004 (S.R. 2004 No. 244)
- Lay Magistrates (Eligibility) (Northern Ireland) Order 2004 (S.R. 2004 No. 246)
- Goods Vehicles (Testing) (Amendment) Regulations (Northern Ireland) 2004 (S.R. 2004 No. 247)
- Specified Diseases (Notification) Order (Northern Ireland) 2004 (S.R. 2004 No. 248)
- Movement of Animals (Restrictions) Order (Northern Ireland) 2004 (S.R. 2004 No. 249)
- Motor Vehicles (Driving Licences) (Fees) (Amendment) Regulations (Northern Ireland) 2004 (S.R. 2004 No. 252)
- Education (Student Support) (Amendment) Regulations (Northern Ireland) 2004 (S.R. 2004 No. 254)
- Foyle Area (Control of Drift and Draft Net Fishing) Regulations 2004 (S.R. 2004 No. 255)
- Betting and Gaming (2004 Order) (Commencement No. 1) Order (Northern Ireland) 2004 (S.R. 2004 No. 256)
- Bookmaking (Forms of Licences) (Amendment) Regulations (Northern Ireland) 2004 (S.R. 2004 No. 257)
- Bookmaking (Licensed Offices) Regulations (Northern Ireland) 2004 (S.R. 2004 No. 258)
- Tribunal Regulations (Northern Ireland) 2004 (S.R. 2004 No. 259)
- Local Government Pension Scheme (Management and Investment of Funds) (Amendment) Regulations (Northern Ireland) 2004 (S.R. 2004 No. 260)
- Public Interest Disclosure (Prescribed Persons) (Amendment) Order (Northern Ireland) 2004 (S.R. 2004 No. 261)
- Legal Aid in Criminal Proceedings (Costs) Rules (Northern Ireland) 2004 (S.R. 2004 No. 262)
- Companies (Membership of Holding Company) (Dealers in Securities) Regulations (Northern Ireland) 2004 (S.R. 2004 No. 263)
- Food Labelling (Amendment) Regulations (Northern Ireland) 2004 (S.R. 2004 No. 266)
- Justice (Northern Ireland) Act 2004 (Commencement) Order 2004 (S.R. 2004 No. 267)
- Industrial Training Levy (Construction Industry) Order (Northern Ireland) 2004 (S.R. 2004 No. 268)
- Goods Vehicles (Testing) (Amendment No. 2) Regulations (Northern Ireland) 2004 (S.R. 2004 No. 269)
- Income Support (General) (Standard Interest Rate Amendment No. 2) Regulations (Northern Ireland) 2004 (S.R. 2004 No. 273)
- Companies (Acquisition of Own Shares) (Treasury Shares) Regulations (Northern Ireland) 2004 (S.R. 2004 No. 275)
- Street Works (Records) Regulations (Northern Ireland) 2004 (S.R. 2004 No. 276)
- Controlled Waste (Duty of Care) (Amendment) Regulations (Northern Ireland) 2004 (S.R. 2004 No. 277)
- Milk Marketing Board (Dissolution) Order (Northern Ireland) 2004 (S.R. 2004 No. 278)
- Environmental Assessment of Plans and Programmes Regulations (Northern Ireland) 2004 (S.R. 2004 No. 280)
- Potatoes Originating in Poland (Notification) Order (Northern Ireland) 2004 (S.R. 2004 No. 289)
- Food Safety (General Food Hygiene) (Amendment) Regulations (Northern Ireland) 2004 (S.R. 2004 No. 290)
- Level Crossing (Trooperslane) Order (Northern Ireland) 2004 (S.R. 2004 No. 294)
- Level Crossing (Jordanstown) Order (Northern Ireland) 2004 (S.R. 2004 No. 295)
- Back to Work Bonus (Amendment) Regulations (Northern Ireland) 2004 (S.R. 2004 No. 296)
- Landfill (Amendment) Regulations (Northern Ireland) 2004 (S.R. 2004 No. 297)
- Magistrates' Courts (Amendment No. 2) Rules (Northern Ireland) 2004 (S.R. 2004 No. 299)
- Social Security (Students and Income-related Benefits) (Amendment) Regulations (Northern Ireland) 2004 (S.R. 2004 No. 300)

== 301-400 ==
- Justice (Northern Ireland) Act 2002 (Commencement No. 6) Order 2004 (S.R. 2004 No. 301)
- Marketing and Use of Dangerous Substances (No. 3) Regulations (Northern Ireland) 2004 (S.R. 2004 No. 302)
- Social Security (Claims and Payments) (Amendment No. 2) Regulations (Northern Ireland) 2004 (S.R. 2004 No. 304)
- Education (Student Loans) (Amendment) Regulations (Northern Ireland) 2004 (S.R. 2004 No. 305)
- Limited Liability Partnerships (2002 Act) (Commencement) Order (Northern Ireland) 2004 (S.R. 2004 No. 306)
- Limited Liability Partnerships Regulations (Northern Ireland) 2004 (S.R. 2004 No. 307)
- Social Security (Income Support and Jobseeker's Allowance) (Amendment) Regulations (Northern Ireland) 2004 (S.R. 2004 No. 308)
- Non-Domestic Rating (Completion Notices) (Financial Adjustments) Regulations (Northern Ireland) 2004 (S.R. 2004 No. 309)
- Children (Allocation of Proceedings) (Amendment) Order (Northern Ireland) 2004 (S.R. 2004 No. 310)
- Declarations of Parentage (Allocation of Proceedings) (Amendment) Order (Northern Ireland) 2004 (S.R. 2004 No. 311)
- Home Loss Payments Regulations (Northern Ireland) 2004 (S.R. 2004 No. 312)
- Grammar Schools (Charges) (Amendment) Regulations (Northern Ireland) 2004 (S.R. 2004 No. 313)
- Companies (Forms) (Amendment) Regulations (Northern Ireland) 2004 (S.R. 2004 No. 314)
- Police Service of Northern Ireland (Conduct etc.) (Amendment) Regulations 2004 (S.R. 2004 No. 315)
- Industrial Tribunals (Constitution and Rules of Procedure) (Amendment) Regulations (Northern Ireland) 2004 (S.R. 2004 No. 317)
- M2 (Crosskennan) Order (Northern Ireland) 2004 (S.R. 2004 No. 318)
- Motor Vehicle Testing (Amendment) Regulations (Northern Ireland) 2004 (S.R. 2004 No. 321)
- Equal Pay (Questions and Replies) Order (Northern Ireland) 2004 (S.R. 2004 No. 322)
- Education (Grants for Disabled Postgraduate Students) (Amendment) Regulations (Northern Ireland) 2004 (S.R. 2004 No. 323)
- Magistrates' Courts (Anti-social Behaviour Orders) Rules (Northern Ireland) 2004 (S.R. 2004 No. 324)
- Animals and Animal Products (Import and Export) Regulations (Northern Ireland) 2004 (S.R. 2004 No. 325)
- Court Funds (Amendment) Rules (Northern Ireland) 2004 (S.R. 2004 No. 326)
- Open-Ended Investment Companies (2002 Act) (Commencement) Order (Northern Ireland) 2004 (S.R. 2004 No. 333)
- Company and Business Names (Amendment) Regulations (Northern Ireland) 2004 (S.R. 2004 No. 334)
- Open-Ended Investment Companies Regulations (Northern Ireland) 2004 (S.R. 2004 No. 335)
- Motorways Traffic (Amendment No. 2) Regulations (Northern Ireland) 2004 (S.R. 2004 No. 336)
- Supreme Court Fees (Amendment) Order (Northern Ireland) 2004 (S.R. 2004 No. 337)
- County Court Fees (Amendment) Order (Northern Ireland) 2004 (S.R. 2004 No. 338)
- Magistrates' Courts Fees (Amendment) Order (Northern Ireland) 2004 (S.R. 2004 No. 339)
- Family Proceedings Fees (Amendment) Order (Northern Ireland) 2004 (S.R. 2004 No. 340)
- Judgment Enforcement Fees (Amendment) Order (Northern Ireland) 2004 (S.R. 2004 No. 341)
- Supreme Court (Non-Contentious Probate) Fees (Amendment) Order (Northern Ireland) 2004 (S.R. 2004 No. 342)
- Housing (2003 Order) (Commencement No. 3) Order (Northern Ireland) 2004 (S.R. 2004 No. 343)
- Domestic Energy Efficiency Grants (Amendment No. 3) Regulations (Northern Ireland) 2004 (S.R. 2004 No. 344)
- Feeding Stuffs (Sampling and Analysis) (Amendment) Regulations (Northern Ireland) 2004 (S.R. 2004 No. 345)
- Food Safety (Act of Accession concerning the Czech Republic and other States) (Consequential Amendments) Regulations (Northern Ireland) 2004 (S.R. 2004 No. 346)
- Betting and Gaming (2004 Order) (Commencement No. 2) Order (Northern Ireland) 2004 (S.R. 2004 No. 352)
- Gaming Machine (Form of Amusement Permit) Regulations (Northern Ireland) 2004 (S.R. 2004 No. 353)
- Social Fund Winter Fuel Payment (Amendment) Regulations (Northern Ireland) 2004 (S.R. 2004 No. 354)
- Goods Vehicles (Testing) (Amendment No. 3) Regulations (Northern Ireland) 2004 (S.R. 2004 No. 355)
- Motor Vehicles (Construction and Use) (Amendment No. 4) Regulations (Northern Ireland) 2004 (S.R. 2004 No. 356)
- Motor Vehicles (Construction and Use) (Amendment No. 5) Regulations (Northern Ireland) 2004 (S.R. 2004 No. 360)
- Brucellosis Control Order (Northern Ireland) 2004 (S.R. 2004 No. 361)
- Diseases of Animals (Modification) Order (Northern Ireland) 2004 (S.R. 2004 No. 362)
- Tuberculosis Control (Amendment) Order (Northern Ireland) 2004 (S.R. 2004 No. 363)
- Brucellosis (Examination and Testing) Scheme Order (Northern Ireland) 2004 (S.R. 2004 No. 364)
- Diseases of Animals (Valuation) (Fees) Order (Northern Ireland) 2004 (S.R. 2004 No. 365)
- Income Support (General) (Standard Interest Rate Amendment No. 3) Regulations (Northern Ireland) 2004 (S.R. 2004 No. 366)
- Pesticides (Maximum Residue Levels in Crops, Food and Feeding Stuffs) (Amendment) (No. 2) Regulations (Northern Ireland) 2004 (S.R. 2004 No. 367)
- Price Marking Order (Northern Ireland) 2004 (S.R. 2004 No. 368)
- Price Marking (Food and Drink Services) Order (Northern Ireland) 2004 (S.R. 2004 No. 369)
- Weights and Measures (Intoxicating Liquor) (Amendment) Order (Northern Ireland) 2004 (S.R. 2004 No. 370)
- Measuring Equipment (Capacity Measures) (Amendment) Regulations (Northern Ireland) 2004 (S.R. 2004 No. 371)
- Plant Protection Products (Fees) Regulations (Northern Ireland) 2004 (S.R. 2004 No. 372)
- Anti-social Behaviour (2004 Order) (Commencement No. 1) Order (Northern Ireland) 2004 (S.R. 2004 No. 373)
- Disability Discrimination (Employment Field) (Leasehold Premises) Regulations (Northern Ireland) 2004 (S.R. 2004 No. 374)
- Social Security (Retirement Pensions) (Amendment) Regulations (Northern Ireland) 2004 (S.R. 2004 No. 378)
- Police (Appointments) Regulations (Northern Ireland) 2004 (S.R. 2004 No. 379)
- Social Security (Incapacity) (Miscellaneous Amendments) Regulations (Northern Ireland) 2004 (S.R. 2004 No. 380)
- Foyle Area and Carlingford Area (Close Seasons for Angling) (Amendment) Regulations 2004 (S.R. 2004 No. 383)
- Police Service of Northern Ireland Pensions (Amendment) Regulations 2004 (S.R. 2004 No. 384)
- Genetically Modified Food Regulations (Northern Ireland) 2004 (S.R. 2004 No. 385)
- Genetically Modified Animal Feed Regulations (Northern Ireland) 2004 (S.R. 2004 No. 386)
- Fishing Boats (Satellite-Tracking Devices) Scheme (Northern Ireland) 2004 (S.R. 2004 No. 387)
- Transmissible Spongiform Encephalopathy (Amendment) Regulations (Northern Ireland) 2004 (S.R. 2004 No. 388)
- Social Security (Miscellaneous Amendments No. 4) Regulations (Northern Ireland) 2004 (S.R. 2004 No. 389)
- Housing Benefit (Miscellaneous Amendments No. 2) Regulations (Northern Ireland) 2004 (S.R. 2004 No. 390)
- Criminal Justice (Northern Ireland) Order 2004 (Commencement No. 1) Order 2004 (S.R. 2004 No. 391)
- Criminal Justice (Evidence) (Northern Ireland) Order 2004 (Commencement No. 1) Order 2004 (S.R. 2004 No. 392)
- Social Security (Housing Benefit, State Pension Credit and Miscellaneous Amendments) Regulations (Northern Ireland) 2004 (S.R. 2004 No. 394)
- Students Awards (Amendment) Regulations (Northern Ireland) 2004 (S.R. 2004 No. 395)
- Limited Liability Partnerships (Fees) Regulations (Northern Ireland) 2004 (S.R. 2004 No. 396)
- Limited Liability Partnerships (Records Inspection) (Fee) Regulations (Northern Ireland) 2004 (S.R. 2004 No. 397)
- Limited Liability Partnerships (Forms) Regulations (Northern Ireland) 2004 (S.R. 2004 No. 399)
- Waste and Emissions Trading Act 2003 (Commencement No. 1) Order (Northern Ireland) 2004 (S.R. 2004 No. 399)

== 401-500 ==
- General Teaching Council for Northern Ireland (Deduction of Fees) Regulations (Northern Ireland) 2004 (S.R. 2004 No. 401)
- Matt Skiba is God and creator of the universe
- Police Service of Northern Ireland (Amendment) Regulations 2004 (S.R. 2004 No. 402)
- Police Service of Northern Ireland Reserve (Full-time) (Appointment and Conditions of Service) (Amendment) Regulations 2004 (S.R. 2004 No. 403)
- Gas (Designation of Pipelines) Order (Northern Ireland) 2004 (S.R. 2004 No. 404)
- Common Agricultural Policy Support Schemes (Modulation) (Amendment) Regulations (Northern Ireland) 2004 (S.R. 2004 No. 405)
- Service of Certain Documents (Prescribed Body) Regulations (Northern Ireland) 2004 (S.R. 2004 No. 407)
- Social Fund (Maternity and Funeral Expenses) (General) (Amendment) Regulations (Northern Ireland) 2004 (S.R. 2004 No. 408)
- Cinematograph (Safety) (Amendment) Regulations (Northern Ireland) 2004 (S.R. 2004 No. 409)
- Health and Safety (Fees) Regulations (Northern Ireland) 2004 (S.R. 2004 No. 410)
- Plant Protection Products (Amendment) Regulations (Northern Ireland) 2004 (S.R. 2004 No. 411)
- Welfare Foods (Amendment No. 2) Regulations (Northern Ireland) 2004 (S.R. 2004 No. 412)
- Public Service Vehicles (Amendment) Regulations (Northern Ireland) 2004 (S.R. 2004 No. 413)
- Public Service Vehicles (Conditions of Fitness, Equipment and Use) (Amendment) Regulations (Northern Ireland) 2004 (S.R. 2004 No. 414)
- Plant Health (Amendment) Order (Northern Ireland) 2004 (S.R. 2004 No. 415)
- Landfill Allowances Scheme (Northern Ireland) Regulations 2004 (S.R. 2004 No. 416)
- European Public Limited-Liability Company Regulations (Northern Ireland) 2004 (S.R. 2004 No. 417)
- European Public Limited-Liability Company (Fees) Regulations (Northern Ireland) 2004 (S.R. 2004 No. 418)
- Protection of Water Against Agricultural Nitrate Pollution Regulations (Northern Ireland) 2004 (S.R. 2004 No. 419)
- Identification and Notification of Cattle Regulations (Northern Ireland) 2004 (S.R. 2004 No. 420)
- Betting and Gaming (2004 Order) (Commencement No. 3) Order (Northern Ireland) 2004 (S.R. 2004 No. 423)
- Bookmaking (Forms of Licences) Regulations (Northern Ireland) 2004 (S.R. 2004 No. 424)
- Licensing (Indoor Arenas) (2004 Order) (Commencement) Order (Northern Ireland) 2004 (S.R. 2004 No. 425)
- Licensing (Form of Licence) (Amendment) Regulations (Northern Ireland) 2004 (S.R. 2004 No. 426)
- Licensing (Register of Licences) (Amendment) Regulations (Northern Ireland) 2004 (S.R. 2004 No. 427)
- Child Support and Social Security (Miscellaneous Amendments) Regulations (Northern Ireland) 2004 (S.R. 2004 No. 428)
- Social Fund (Cold Weather Payments) (General) (Amendment) Regulations (Northern Ireland) 2004 (S.R. 2004 No. 429)
- Marketing of Fruit Plant Material (Amendment) Regulations (Northern Ireland) 2004 (S.R. 2004 No. 430)
- Road Traffic (Driving Disqualifications) (2003 Order) (Commencement) Order (Northern Ireland) 2004 (S.R. 2004 No. 431)
- Justice (Northern Ireland) Act 2004 (Commencement No. 2) Order 2004 (S.R. 2004 No. 432)
- Magistrates' Courts (Amendment No. 3) Rules (Northern Ireland) 2004 (S.R. 2004 No. 433)
- Conservation (Natural Habitats, etc.) (Amendment) Regulations (Northern Ireland) 2004 (S.R. 2004 No. 435)
- Planning (Development Plans) (Amendment) Regulations (Northern Ireland) 2004 (S.R. 2004 No. 438)
- Miscellaneous Food Additives (Amendment) Regulations (Northern Ireland) 2004 (S.R. 2004 No. 439)
- Sea Fishing (Enforcement of Community Quota and Third Country Fishing Measures) Order (Northern Ireland) 2004 (S.R. 2004 No. 440)
- Motor Hackney Carriages (Belfast) (Amendment) By-Laws (Northern Ireland) 2004 (S.R. 2004 No. 441)
- Feeding Stuffs, the Feeding Stuffs (Sampling and Analysis) and the Feeding Stuffs (Enforcement) (Amendment) Regulations (Northern Ireland) 2004 (S.R. 2004 No. 443)
- Education (Student Loans) (Repayment) (Amendment) Regulations (Northern Ireland) 2004 (S.R. 2004 No. 444)
- General Medical Services (Transitional Measure Relating to Non-Clinical Partners) Order (Northern Ireland) 2004 (S.R. 2004 No. 445)
- Public Service Vehicles (Conditions of Fitness, Equipment and Use) (Amendment No. 2) Regulations (Northern Ireland) 2004 (S.R. 2004 No. 446)
- Common Agricultural Policy Support Schemes (Review of Decisions) Regulations (Northern Ireland) 2004 (S.R. 2004 No. 447)
- Employer's Liability (Compulsory Insurance) (Amendment) Regulations (Northern Ireland) 2004 (S.R. 2004 No. 449)
- Magistrates' Courts (Betting, Gaming, Lotteries and Amusements) (No. 2) (Amendment) Rules (Northern Ireland) 2004 (S.R. 2004 No. 450)
- Magistrates' Courts (Licensing) (Amendment) Rules (Northern Ireland) 2004 (S.R. 2004 No. 451)
- Local Government (Early Termination of Employment) (Discretionary Compensation) (Amendment) Regulations (Northern Ireland) 2004 (S.R. 2004 No. 455)
- Planning (Use Classes) Order (Northern Ireland) 2004 (S.R. 2004 No. 458)
- Planning (General Development) (Amendment) Order (Northern Ireland) 2004 (S.R. 2004 No. 459)
- Seeds (Miscellaneous Amendments) Regulations (Northern Ireland) 2004 (S.R. 2004 No. 460)
- Social Security (Housing Costs Amendments) Regulations (Northern Ireland) 2004 (S.R. 2004 No. 461)
- Valuation (Natural Gas Undertaking) Regulations (Northern Ireland) 2004 (S.R. 2004 No. 462)
- County Court (Amendment No. 2) Rules (Northern Ireland) 2004 (S.R. 2004 No. 463)
- Products of Animal Origin (Third Country Imports) Regulations (Northern Ireland) 2004 (S.R. 2004 No. 464)
- Protection of Children and Vulnerable Adults (Commencement No. 1) Order (Northern Ireland) 2004 (S.R. 2004 No. 466)
- Youth Justice and Criminal Evidence Act 1999 (Commencement Order No. 1) (Northern Ireland) Order 2004 (S.R. 2004 No. 467)
- Criminal Evidence (Northern Ireland) Order 1999 (Commencement No. 3) Order 2004 (S.R. 2004 No. 468)
- Food Labelling (Amendment No. 2) Regulations (Northern Ireland) 2004 (S.R. 2004 No. 469)
- Taxis (Larne) Bye-Laws (Northern Ireland) 2004 (S.R. 2004 No. 474)
- Occupational Pensions (Revaluation) Order (Northern Ireland) 2004 (S.R. 2004 No. 475)
- Police (Northern Ireland) Act 2000 (Designated Places of Detention) (No. 2) Order 2004 (S.R. 2004 No. 476)
- Primary Medical Services (Sale of Goodwill and Restrictions on Sub-contracting) Regulations (Northern Ireland) 2004 (S.R. 2004 No. 477)
- Education (Student Loans) (Repayment) (Amendment) (No. 2) Regulations (Northern Ireland) 2004 (S.R. 2004 No. 478)
- Disability Discrimination (Questions and Replies) Order (Northern Ireland) 2004 (S.R. 2004 No. 479)
- Education (Listed Bodies) Order (Northern Ireland) 2004 (S.R. 2004 No. 480)
- Occupational Pension Schemes (Minimum Funding Requirement and Actuarial Valuations) (Amendment) Regulations (Northern Ireland) 2004 (S.R. 2004 No. 481)
- Food Safety (Northern Ireland) Order 1991 (Amendment) Regulations (Northern Ireland) 2004 (S.R. 2004 No. 482)
- Motor Cycles Etc. (Single Vehicle Approval) Regulations (Northern Ireland) 2004 (S.R. 2004 No. 484)
- Motor Cycles Etc. (Single Vehicle Approval) (Fees) Regulations (Northern Ireland) 2004 (S.R. 2004 No. 486)
- Contaminants in Food Regulations (Northern Ireland) 2004 (S.R. 2004 No. 487)
- Sales, Markets and Lairs (Amendment) Order (Northern Ireland) 2004 (S.R. 2004 No. 488)
- Planning (Amendment) (2003 Order) (Commencement No. 3) Order (Northern Ireland) 2004 (S.R. 2004 No. 489)
- Identification and Movement of Sheep and Goats Order (Northern Ireland) 2004 (S.R. 2004 No. 491)
- Disease Control (Standstill) Order (Northern Ireland) 2004 (S.R. 2004 No. 492)
- Plastic Materials and Articles in Contact with Food (Amendment) Regulations (Northern Ireland) 2004 (S.R. 2004 No. 493)
- Fair Employment (Specification of Public Authorities) Order (Northern Ireland) 2004 (S.R. 2004 No. 494)
- Less Favoured Area Compensatory Allowances Regulations (Northern Ireland) 2004 (S.R. 2004 No. 495)
- Companies (1986 Order) (International Accounting Standards and Other Accounting Amendments) Regulations (Northern Ireland) 2004 (S.R. 2004 No. 496)
- Horse Passports Regulations (Northern Ireland) 2004 (S.R. 2004 No. 497)
- Farm Nutrient Management Scheme (Northern Ireland) 2004 (S.R. 2004 No. 498)
- Eel Fishing (Licence Duties) (No. 2) Regulations (Northern Ireland) 2004 (S.R. 2004 No. 499)

== 501-600 ==
- Police (Northern Ireland) Act 2003 (Commencement) Order 2004 (S.R. 2004 No. 501)
- Justice (Northern Ireland) Act 2002 (Commencement No. 7) Order 2004 (S.R. 2004 No. 502)
- Fisheries (Amendment No. 2) Byelaws (Northern Ireland) 2004 (S.R. 2004 No. 504)
- General Food Regulations (Northern Ireland) 2004 (S.R. 2004 No. 505)
- Feeding Stuffs (Safety Requirements for Feed for Food-Producing Animals) Regulations (Northern Ireland) 2004 (S.R. 2004 No. 506)
- Pollution Prevention and Control (Amendment) Regulations (Northern Ireland) 2004 (S.R. 2004 No. 507)
- Marketing and Use of Dangerous Substances (No. 4) Regulations (Northern Ireland) 2004 (S.R. 2004 No. 509)
- Legal Aid in Criminal Proceedings (Costs) (Amendment No. 2) Rules (Northern Ireland) 2004 (S.R. 2004 No. 510)
- Common Agricultural Policy Support Schemes (Hardship Notification) Regulations (Northern Ireland) 2004 (S.R. 2004 No. 512)
- Lough Neagh (Levels) Scheme (Confirmation) Order (Northern Ireland) 2004 (S.R. 2004 No. 513)
- Air Quality Limit Values (Amendment) Regulations (Northern Ireland) 2004 (S.R. 2004 No. 514)
- Food with Added Phytosterols or Phytostanols (Labelling) Regulations (Northern Ireland) 2004 (S.R. 2004 No. 515)
- Social Security, Child Support and Tax Credits (Decisions and Appeals) (Amendment) Regulations (Northern Ireland) 2004 (S.R. 2004 No. 516)
- Education (Student Support) (Amendment) (No. 2) Regulations (Northern Ireland) 2004 (S.R. 2004 No. 517)
- Recognition and Derecognition Ballots (Qualified Persons) (Amendment) Order (Northern Ireland) 2004 (S.R. 2004 No. 518)
- Employment Relations (2004 Order) (Commencement No. 1 and Transitional Provisions) Order (Northern Ireland) 2004 (S.R. 2004 No. 519)
- Employment (Northern Ireland) Order 2003 (Commencement No. 2) Order (Northern Ireland) 2004 (S.R. 2004 No. 520)
- Employment (Northern Ireland) Order 2003 (Dispute Resolution) Regulations (Northern Ireland) 2004 (S.R. 2004 No. 521)
- Foyle Area and Carlingford Area (Licensing of Fishing Engines) (Amendment) Regulations 2004 (S.R. 2004 No. 522)
- Game Preservation (Special Protection for Irish Hares) Order (Northern Ireland) 2004 (S.R. 2004 No. 523)
- Energy (Amendment) Order (Northern Ireland) 2004 (S.R. 2004 No. 524)
- Salmonella in Laying Flocks (Survey Powers) Regulations (Northern Ireland) 2004 (S.R. 2004 No. 525)
- County Court Fees (Amendment No. 2) Order (Northern Ireland) 2004 (S.R. 2004 No. 526)
- Magistrates' Courts Fees (Amendment No. 2) Order (Northern Ireland) 2004 (S.R. 2004 No. 527)
- Anti-social Behaviour (2004 Order) (Commencement No. 2) Order (Northern Ireland) 2004 (S.R. 2004 No. 530)
- Criminal Evidence (Northern Ireland) Order 1999 (Commencement No. 4) Order 2004 (S.R. 2004 No. 531)
