= Northern Ireland Act 2009 =

Act of the Parliament of the United Kingdom

Northern Ireland Act 2009 (Note: Section 5(1).)
- Act of Parliament
- Parliament of the United Kingdom
- Long title: An Act to make provision in relation to policing and justice in Northern Ireland; and to amend section 86 of the Northern Ireland Act 1998.
- Citation: 2009 c. 3
- Introduced by: Shaun Woodward MP, Secretary of State for Northern Ireland (Commons); Baroness Royall of Blaisdon (Lords)
- Territorial extent: United Kingdom (Note: Section 5(2).)

Dates
- Royal assent: 12 March 2009
- Commencement: Various (Note: Section 5(6)–(8).)
Other legislation
Amends	Pensions Appeal Tribunals Act 1943; Coroners Act (Northern Ireland) 1959; County Courts Act (Northern Ireland) 1959; Magistrates' Courts Act (Northern Ireland) 1964; Lands Tribunal and Compensation Act (Northern Ireland) 1964; Misuse of Drugs Act 1971; Rates (Northern Ireland) Order 1977; Judicature (Northern Ireland) Act 1978; Reserve Forces (Safeguard of Employment) Act 1985; Mental Health (Northern Ireland) Order 1986; Adoption (Northern Ireland) Order 1987; Child Support Act 1991; Social Security Administration (Northern Ireland) Act 1992; Tribunals and Inquiries Act 1992; Education (Northern Ireland) Order 1996; Juries (Northern Ireland) Order 1996; Plant Varieties Act 1997; Deregulation (Model Appeal Provisions) Order (Northern Ireland) 1997; Northern Ireland Act 1998; Social Security (Northern Ireland) Order 1998; Fair Employment and Treatment (Northern Ireland) Order 1998; Justice (Northern Ireland) Act 2002; Criminal Injuries Compensation (Northern Ireland) Order 2002; Health and Personal Social Services (Quality, Improvement and Regulation) (Northern Ireland) Order 2003; Justice (Northern Ireland) Act 2004; Constitutional Reform Act 2005; Traffic Management (Northern Ireland) Order 2005; Industrial Tribunals (Constitution and Rules of Procedure) Regulations (Northern Ireland) 2005; Fair Employment Tribunal (Rules of Procedure) Regulations (Northern Ireland) 2005; Northern Ireland (Miscellaneous Provisions) Act 2006; Charities Act (Northern Ireland) 2008
Amended by	Department of Justice Act (Northern Ireland) 2010; Northern Ireland Act 1998 (Devolution of Policing and Justice Functions) Order 2010

Status: Amended

History of passage through Parliament

Text of statute as originally enacted

Revised text of statute as amended

The Northern Ireland Act 2009 (c. 3) is an act of the Parliament of the United Kingdom relating to the devolution of policing and justice.

== Background ==
According to the Guardian the devolution of policing and justice functions was the "final piece in the jigsaw" in relation to Northern Ireland devolution.

== Legislative passage ==
The bill was passed by the House of Commons in one day.

== Provisions ==
It makes provision preparatory to the intended devolution of "policing and justice" to the Northern Ireland Assembly.

== Commencement ==
The whole act has been brought into force.

Sections 1 and 3(2) and 4 and 5 came into force on 12 March 2009.

Paragraphs 35(1) and (3) of schedule 4, so far as they relate to the President or other member of the Charity Tribunal for Northern Ireland, and section 2(3), so far as it relates to those provisions, came into force on 26 September 2009.

The following provisions came into force on 12 April 2010:

- Section 2, so far as not already in force
- Section 3(1)
- Schedules 2 and 3
- Schedule 4, so far as not already in force
- Schedules 5 and 6

== Further developments ==
The act was subsequently followed by the Department of Justice Act (Northern Ireland) 2010.

== See also ==
- Northern Ireland Act
