= List of statutory rules of Northern Ireland, 2005 =

This is an incomplete list of statutory rules of Northern Ireland in 2005.

== 1-100 ==
- Road Vehicles Lighting (Amendment) Regulations (Northern Ireland) 2005 (S.R. 2005 No. 1)
- Employer's Liability (Compulsory Insurance) (Amendment) Regulations (Northern Ireland) 2005 (S.R. 2005 No. 2)
- Firearms (Appeals and Applications) Regulations (Northern Ireland) 2005 (S.R. 2005 No. 3)
- Firearms (Northern Ireland) Order 2004 (Commencement and Transitional Provisions) Order 2005 (S.R. 2005 No. 4)
- Farm Nutrient Management Scheme (Northern Ireland) 2005 (S.R. 2005 No. 5)
- Common Agricultural Policy Single Payment and Support Schemes (Cross Compliance) Regulations (Northern Ireland) 2005 (S.R. 2005 No. 6)
- Salaries (Comptroller and Auditor General) Order (Northern Ireland) 2005 (S.R. 2005 No. 11)
- Employment Rights (Increase of Limits) Order (Northern Ireland) 2005 (S.R. 2005 No. 12)
- Social Security (Claims and Payments and Payments on account, Overpayments and Recovery) (Amendment) Regulations (Northern Ireland) 2005 (S.R. 2005 No. 14)
- Social Security (Incapacity for Work) (General) (Amendment) Regulations (Northern Ireland) 2005 (S.R. 2005 No. 15)
- Social Security Pensions (Home Responsibilities) (Amendment) Regulations (Northern Ireland) 2005 (S.R. 2005 No. 16)
- Sweeteners in Food (Amendment) Regulations (Northern Ireland) 2005 (S.R. 2005 No. 18)
- Miscellaneous Food Additives (Amendment) Regulations (Northern Ireland) 2005 (S.R. 2005 No. 19)
- Occupational Pension Schemes (Winding Up, Deficiency on Winding Up and Transfer Values) (Amendment) Regulations (Northern Ireland) 2005 (S.R. 2005 No. 20)
- Rates (Regional Rates) Order (Northern Ireland) 2005 (S.R. 2005 No. 21)
- Motor Vehicles (Construction and Use) (Amendment) Regulations (Northern Ireland) 2005 (S.R. 2005 No. 22)
- Plant Health (Phytophthora ramorum) Order (Northern Ireland) 2005 (S.R. 2005 No. 23)
- Transmissible Spongiform Encephalopathy (Amendment) Regulations (Northern Ireland) 2005 (S.R. 2005 No. 25)
- Weights and Measures (Standards Amendment) Regulations (Northern Ireland) 2005 (S.R. 2005 No. 26)
- Weighing Equipment (Automatic Gravimetric Filling Instruments) Regulations (Northern Ireland) 2005 (S.R. 2005 No. 27)
- Beef Carcase (Classification) Regulations (Northern Ireland) 2005 (S.R. 2005 No. 28)
- Registered Rents (Increase) Order (Northern Ireland) 2005 (S.R. 2005 No. 29)
- Food (Pistachios from Iran) (Emergency Control) (Amendment) Regulations (Northern Ireland) 2005 (S.R. 2005 No. 30)
- Energy (2003 Order) (Commencement No. 3) Order (Northern Ireland) 2005 (S.R. 2005 No. 31)
- Water Resources (Environmental Impact Assessment) Regulations (Northern Ireland) 2005 (S.R. 2005 No. 32)
- Social Security Revaluation of Earnings Factors Order (Northern Ireland) 2005 (S.R. 2005 No. 33)
- Social Security Pensions (Low Earnings Threshold) Order (Northern Ireland) 2005 (S.R. 2005 No. 34)
- Poultry Meat, Farmed Game Bird Meat and Rabbit Meat (Hygiene and Inspection) (Amendment) Regulations (Northern Ireland) 2005 (S.R. 2005 No. 35)
- Salaries (Assembly Ombudsman and Commissioner for Complaints) Order (Northern Ireland) 2005 (S.R. 2005 No. 36)
- Social Security (Industrial Injuries) (Prescribed Diseases) (Amendment) Regulations (Northern Ireland) 2005 (S.R. 2005 No. 37)
- Renewables Obligation Order (Northern Ireland) 2005 (S.R. 2005 No. 38)
- Seeds (Fees) (Amendment) Regulations (Northern Ireland) 2005 (S.R. 2005 No. 40)
- Regulation and Improvement Authority (Consultation on Transfer of Staff) Regulations (Northern Ireland) 2005 (S.R. 2005 No. 43)
- Health and Personal Social Services (Quality, Improvement and Regulation) (2003 Order) (Commencement No. 3 & Transitional Provisions) Order (Northern Ireland) 2005 (S.R. 2005 No. 44)
- Diving at Work Regulations (Northern Ireland) 2005 (S.R. 2005 No. 45)
- Social Security, Child Support and Tax Credits (Miscellaneous Amendments) Regulations (Northern Ireland) 2005 (S.R. 2005 No. 46)
- Information and Consultation of Employees Regulations (Northern Ireland) 2005 (S.R. 2005 No. 47)
- Pensions (2005 Order) (Commencement No. 1 and Consequential and Transitional Provisions) Order (Northern Ireland) 2005 (S.R. 2005 No. 48)
- Plastic Materials and Articles in Contact with Food (Amendment) Regulations (Northern Ireland) 2005 (S.R. 2005 No. 49)
- Pesticides (Maximum Residue Levels in Crops, Food and Feeding Stuffs) (Amendment) Regulations (Northern Ireland) 2005 (S.R. 2005 No. 51)
- Organic Farming (Conversion of Animal Housing) (Amendment) Scheme (Northern Ireland) 2005 (S.R. 2005 No. 52)
- Tuberculosis Control (Amendment) Order (Northern Ireland) 2005 (S.R. 2005 No. 53)
- Police (Northern Ireland) Act 2000 (Continuance of Office of Commissioner) Order 2005 (S.R. 2005 No. 54)
- Pension Protection Fund (Partially Guaranteed Schemes) (Modification) Regulations (Northern Ireland) 2005 (S.R. 2005 No. 55)
- Directors' Remuneration Report Regulations (Northern Ireland) 2005 (S.R. 2005 No. 56)
- Companies (Summary Financial Statement) (Amendment) Regulations (Northern Ireland) 2005 (S.R. 2005 No. 57)
- Pneumoconiosis, etc., (Workers' Compensation) (Payment of Claims) (Amendment) Regulations (Northern Ireland) 2005 (S.R. 2005 No. 59)
- Road Traffic (Health Services Charges) (Amendment) Regulations (Northern Ireland) 2005 (S.R. 2005 No. 60)
- Companies (1986 Order) (Operating and Financial Review and Directors' Report etc.) Regulations (Northern Ireland) 2005 (S.R. 2005 No. 61)
- Statutory Maternity Pay (General) (Amendment) Regulations (Northern Ireland) 2005 (S.R. 2005 No. 62)
- Pharmaceutical Society of Northern Ireland (General) (Amendment) Regulations (Northern Ireland) 2005 (S.R. 2005 No. 63)
- Legal Advice and Assistance (Financial Conditions) Regulations (Northern Ireland) 2005 (S.R. 2005 No. 65)
- Legal Aid (Financial Conditions) Regulations (Northern Ireland) 2005 (S.R. 2005 No. 66)
- Legal Advice and Assistance (Amendment) Regulations (Northern Ireland) 2005 (S.R. 2005 No. 67)
- Gas (Designation of Pipelines) Order (Northern Ireland) 2005 (S.R. 2005 No. 68)
- Financial Assistance for Young Farmers Scheme Order (Northern Ireland) 2005 (S.R. 2005 No. 69)
- Dairy Produce Quotas Regulations (Northern Ireland) 2005 (S.R. 2005 No. 70)
- Optical Charges and Payments and General Ophthalmic Services (Amendment) Regulations (Northern Ireland) 2005 (S.R. 2005 No. 71)
- Dental Charges (Amendment) Regulations (Northern Ireland) 2005 (S.R. 2005 No. 72)
- Employment Relations (2004 Order) (Commencement No. 2 and Transitional Provisions) Order (Northern Ireland) 2005 (S.R. 2005 No. 73)
- Feeding Stuffs (Establishments and Intermediaries) (Amendment) Regulations (Northern Ireland) 2005 (S.R. 2005 No. 74)
- Colours in Food (Amendment) Regulations (Northern Ireland) 2005 (S.R. 2005 No. 75)
- Smoke Flavourings Regulations (Northern Ireland) 2005 (S.R. 2005 No. 76)
- Industrial Pollution Control (1997 Order) (Commencement No. 2) Order (Northern Ireland) 2005 (S.R. 2005 No. 77)
- Animals and Animal Products (Import and Export) Regulations (Northern Ireland) 2005 (S.R. 2005 No. 78)
- Crown Court (Prosecution Appeals) Rules (Northern Ireland) 2005 (S.R. 2005 No. 79)
- Crown Court (Amendment) Rules (Northern Ireland) 2005 (S.R. 2005 No. 80)
- Guaranteed Minimum Pensions Increase Order (Northern Ireland) 2005 (S.R. 2005 No. 81)
- Social Security Benefits Up-rating Order (Northern Ireland) 2005 (S.R. 2005 No. 82)
- Pension Protection Fund (Eligible Schemes) Appointed Day Order (Northern Ireland) 2005 (S.R. 2005 No. 83)
- Pension Protection Fund (Hybrid Schemes) (Modification) Regulations (Northern Ireland) 2005 (S.R. 2005 No. 84)
- Contracting-out, Protected Rights and Safeguarded Rights (Transfer Payment) (Amendment) Regulations (Northern Ireland) 2005 (S.R. 2005 No. 85)
- Transfrontier Shipment of Waste (Fees) Regulations (Northern Ireland) 2005 (S.R. 2005 No. 90)
- Pension Protection Fund (Multi-employer Schemes) (Modification) Regulations (Northern Ireland) 2005 (S.R. 2005 No. 91)
- Occupational and Personal Pension Schemes (General Levy) Regulations (Northern Ireland) 2005 (S.R. 2005 No. 92 )
- Register of Occupational and Personal Pension Schemes Regulations (Northern Ireland) 2005 (S.R. 2005 No. 93)
- Transfer of Employment (Pension Protection) Regulations (Northern Ireland) 2005 (S.R. 2005 No. 94)
- Social Security (Industrial Injuries) (Dependency) (Permitted Earnings Limits) Order (Northern Ireland) 2005 (S.R. 2005 No. 95)
- Social Security Benefits Up-rating Regulations (Northern Ireland) 2005 (S.R. 2005 No. 96)
- Charges for Drugs and Appliances (Amendment) Regulations (Northern Ireland) 2005 (S.R. 2005 No. 97)
- Social Security (Miscellaneous Amendments) Regulations (Northern Ireland) 2005 (S.R. 2005 No. 98)
- Regulation and Improvement Authority (Registration) Regulations (Northern Ireland) 2005 (S.R. 2005 No. 99)

== 101-200 ==
- Local Government (General Grant) (Amendment) Regulations (Northern Ireland) 2005 (S.R. 2005 No. 101)
- Pensions Increase (Review) Order (Northern Ireland) 2005 (S.R. 2005 No. 102)
- Health and Personal Social Services (Assessment of Resources) (Amendment) Regulations (Northern Ireland) 2005 (S.R. 2005 No. 103)
- Protection of Children and Vulnerable Adults (2003 Order) (Commencement No. 2) Order (Northern Ireland) 2005 (S.R. 2005 No. 104)
- Protection of Children and Vulnerable Adults (Definitions) Regulations (Northern Ireland) 2005 (S.R. 2005 No. 105)
- Less Favoured Area Compensatory Allowances Regulations (Northern Ireland) 2005 (S.R. 2005 No. 106)
- Travelling Expenses and Remission of Charges (Amendment) Regulations (Northern Ireland) 2005 (S.R. 2005 No. 107)
- Pensions Appeal Tribunals (Northern Ireland) (Amendment) Rules 2005 (S.R. 2005 No. 108)
- Justice (Northern Ireland) Act 2002 (Commencement No. 8) Order 2005 (S.R. 2005 No. 109)
- Stakeholder Pension Schemes (Amendment) Regulations (Northern Ireland) 2005 (S.R. 2005 No. 110)
- Access to Justice (Northern Ireland) Order 2003 (Commencement No. 3, Transitional Provisions and Savings) Order (Northern Ireland) 2005 (S.R. 2005 No. 111)
- Legal Aid for Crown Court Proceedings (Costs) Rules (Northern Ireland) 2005 (S.R. 2005 No. 112)
- Legal Aid in Criminal Proceedings (Costs) (Amendment) Rules (Northern Ireland) 2005 (S.R. 2005 No. 113)
- Pensions Regulator (Freezing Orders and Consequential Amendments) Regulations (Northern Ireland) 2005 (S.R. 2005 No. 114)
- Measuring Instruments (EEC Requirements) (Verification Fees) Regulations (Northern Ireland) 2005 (S.R. 2005 No. 117)
- Weights and Measures (Passing as Fit for Use for Trade and Adjustment Fees) Regulations (Northern Ireland) 2005 (S.R. 2005 No. 118)
- Misuse of Drugs (Amendment) Regulations (Northern Ireland) 2005 (S.R. 2005 No. 119)
- Social Security (Deferral of Retirement Pensions) Regulations (Northern Ireland) 2005 (S.R. 2005 No. 120)
- Social Security (Graduated Retirement Benefit) Regulations (Northern Ireland) 2005 (S.R. 2005 No. 121)
- Social Security (Claims and Payments) (Amendment) Regulations (Northern Ireland) 2005 (S.R. 2005 No. 122)
- Social Security (Retirement Pensions etc.) (Transitional Provisions) Regulations (Northern Ireland) 2005 (S.R. 2005 No. 123)
- Social Security (Inherited SERPS) (Amendment) Regulations (Northern Ireland) 2005 (S.R. 2005 No. 124)
- Child Support (Miscellaneous Amendments) Regulations (Northern Ireland) 2005 (S.R. 2005 No. 125)
- Pension Protection Fund (Entry Rules) Regulations (Northern Ireland) 2005 (S.R. 2005 No. 126)
- Pension Protection Fund (Reviewable Matters) Regulations (Northern Ireland) 2005 (S.R. 2005 No. 127)
- Pension Protection Fund (Maladministration) Regulations (Northern Ireland) 2005 (S.R. 2005 No. 128)
- Pension Protection Fund (Provision of Information) Regulations (Northern Ireland) 2005 (S.R. 2005 No. 129)
- Pension Protection Fund (Reviewable Ill Health Pensions) Regulations (Northern Ireland) 2005 (S.R. 2005 No. 130)
- Pension Protection Fund (Valuation) Regulations (Northern Ireland) 2005 (S.R. 2005 No. 131)
- Salmonella in Laying Flocks (Survey Powers) Regulations (Northern Ireland) 2005 (S.R. 2005 No. 132)
- Education and Libraries (2003 Order) (Commencement) Order (Northern Ireland) 2005 (S.R. 2005 No. 133)
- Statutory Maternity Pay (General) (Amendment No. 2) Regulations (Northern Ireland) 2005 (S.R. 2005 No. 134)
- Pension Protection Fund (PPF Ombudsman) Order (Northern Ireland) 2005 (S.R. 2005 No. 135)
- Pension Protection Fund (Pension Compensation Cap) Order (Northern Ireland) 2005 (S.R. 2005 No. 136)
- Occupational Pension Schemes (Modification of Pension Protection Provisions) Regulations (Northern Ireland) 2005 (S.R. 2005 No. 137)
- Pension Protection Fund (Review and Reconsideration of Reviewable Matters) Regulations (Northern Ireland) 2005 (S.R. 2005 No. 138)
- Social Security (Claims and Payments) (Amendment No. 2) Regulations (Northern Ireland) 2005 (S.R. 2005 No. 139)
- Workmen's Compensation (Supplementation) (Amendment) Regulations (Northern Ireland) 2005 (S.R. 2005 No. 142)
- County Court (Amendment) Rules (Northern Ireland) 2005 (S.R. 2005 No. 143)
- Family Proceedings (Amendment) Rules (Northern Ireland) 2005 (S.R. 2005 No. 144)
- Equal Pay Act 1970 (Amendment) Regulations (Northern Ireland) 2005 (S.R. 2005 No. 145)
- Rules of the Supreme Court (Northern Ireland) (Amendment) 2005 (S.R. 2005 No. 146)
- Occupational Pension Schemes (Levies) Regulations (Northern Ireland) 2005 (S.R. 2005 No. 147)
- Housing Benefit (Miscellaneous Amendments) Regulations (Northern Ireland) 2005 (S.R. 2005 No. 148)
- Pension Protection Fund (Compensation) Regulations (Northern Ireland) 2005 (S.R. 2005 No. 149)
- Industrial Tribunals (Constitution and Rules of Procedure) Regulations (Northern Ireland) 2005 (S.R. 2005 No. 150)
- Fair Employment Tribunal (Rules of Procedure) Regulations (Northern Ireland) 2005 (S.R. 2005 No. 151)
- Code of Practice (Disciplinary and Grievance Procedures) (Appointed Day) Order (Northern Ireland) 2005 (S.R. 2005 No. 152)
- Prison and Young Offenders Centre (Amendment) Rules (Northern Ireland) 2005 (S.R. 2005 No. 153)
- Health and Personal Social Services (Superannuation) (Additional Voluntary Contributions) (Amendment) Regulations (Northern Ireland) 2005 (S.R. 2005 No. 154)
- Health and Personal Social Services (Superannuation) (Amendment) Regulations (Northern Ireland) 2005 (S.R. 2005 No. 155)
- Seed Potatoes (Crop Fees) (Amendment) Regulations (Northern Ireland) 2005 (S.R. 2005 No. 156)
- Criminal Appeal (Amendment) (Northern Ireland) Rules 2005 (S.R. 2005 No. 157)
- Criminal Appeal (Retrial for Serious Offences) Rules (Northern Ireland) 2005 (S.R. 2005 No. 158)
- Criminal Appeal (Prosecution Appeals) Rules (Northern Ireland) 2005 (S.R. 2005 No. 159)
- Nursing Homes Regulations (Northern Ireland) 2005 (S.R. 2005 No. 160)
- Residential Care Homes Regulations (Northern Ireland) 2005 (S.R. 2005 No. 161)
- Magistrates' Courts (Amendment) Rules (Northern Ireland) 2005 (S.R. 2005 No. 162)
- Rules of the Supreme Court (Northern Ireland) (Amendment No. 2) 2005 (S.R. 2005 No. 163)
- Social Security Commissioners (Procedure) (Child Trust Funds) Regulations (Northern Ireland) 2005 (S.R. 2005 No. 164)
- Control of Substances Hazardous to Health (Amendment) Regulations (Northern Ireland) 2005 (S.R. 2005 No. 165)
- Pensions (2005 Order) (Commencement No. 2 and Transitional Provisions) Order (Northern Ireland) 2005 (S.R. 2005 No. 166)
- Statutory Paternity Pay and Statutory Adoption Pay (General) (Amendment) Regulations (Northern Ireland) 2005 (S.R. 2005 No. 167)
- Occupational Pension Schemes (Employer Debt) Regulations (Northern Ireland) 2005 (S.R. 2005 No. 168)
- Occupational Pension Schemes (Independent Trustee) Regulations (Northern Ireland) 2005 (S.R. 2005 No. 169)
- Personal and Occupational Pension Schemes (Indexation and Disclosure of Information) (Miscellaneous Amendments) Regulations (Northern Ireland) 2005 (S.R. 2005 No. 170)
- Occupational Pension Schemes (Winding up, etc.) Regulations (Northern Ireland) 2005 (S.R. 2005 No. 171)
- Pensions Regulator (Notifiable Events) Regulations (Northern Ireland) 2005 (S.R. 2005 No. 172)
- Pensions Regulator (Contribution Notices and Restoration Orders) Regulations (Northern Ireland) 2005 (S.R. 2005 No. 173)
- Independent Health Care Regulations (Northern Ireland) 2005 (S.R. 2005 No. 174)
- Nursing Agencies Regulations (Northern Ireland) 2005 (S.R. 2005 No. 175)
- Children's Homes Regulations (Northern Ireland) 2005 (S.R. 2005 No. 176)
- Electricity Grants (Prescribed Purpose) Regulations (Northern Ireland) 2005 (S.R. 2005 No. 177)
- Care Tribunal Regulations (Northern Ireland) 2005 (S.R. 2005 No. 178)
- Teachers' Superannuation (Amendment) Regulations (Northern Ireland) 2005 (S.R. 2005 No. 181)
- Regulation and Improvement Authority (Fees and Frequency of Inspections) Regulations (Northern Ireland) 2005 (S.R. 2005 No. 182)
- Feedingstuffs (Zootechnical Products) (Amendment) Regulations (Northern Ireland) 2005 (S.R. 2005 No. 183)
- Medicated Feedingstuffs (Amendment) Regulations (Northern Ireland) 2005 (S.R. 2005 No. 184)
- Housing Benefit (Miscellaneous Amendments No. 2) Regulations (Northern Ireland) 2005 (S.R. 2005 No. 185)
- Children Order (Miscellaneous Amendments) Regulations (Northern Ireland) 2005 (S.R. 2005 No. 186)
- Gender Recognition Register (Northern Ireland) Regulations 2005 (S.R. 2005 No. 187)
- Statutory Sick Pay (General) and Statutory Maternity Pay (General) (Amendment) Regulations (Northern Ireland) 2005 (S.R. 2005 No. 188)
- Children Leaving Care (2002 Act) (Commencement No. 1) Order (Northern Ireland) 2005 (S.R. 2005 No. 189)
- Welfare Foods (Amendment) Regulations (Northern Ireland) 2005 (S.R. 2005 No. 190)
- Rules of the Supreme Court (Northern Ireland) (Amendment No. 3) 2005 (S.R. 2005 No. 191)
- Pensions (2005 Order) (Commencement No. 3, Appointed Day, Transitional Provisions and Amendment) Order (Northern Ireland) 2005 (S.R. 2005 No. 192)
- Occupational and Personal Pension Schemes (Pension Liberation) Regulations (Northern Ireland) 2005 (S.R. 2005 No. 193)
- Pension Protection Fund and Pensions Regulator (Amendment) Regulations (Northern Ireland) 2005 (S.R. 2005 No. 194)
- Food Labelling (Amendment) Regulations (Northern Ireland) 2005 (S.R. 2005 No. 198)
- Contaminants in Food (Amendment) Regulations (Northern Ireland) 2005 (S.R. 2005 No. 199)
- Transmissible Spongiform Encephalopathy (Amendment No. 2) Regulations (Northern Ireland) 2005 (S.R. 2005 No. 200)

== 201-300 ==
- Miscellaneous Food Additives (Amendment No. 2) Regulations (Northern Ireland) 2005 (S.R. 2005 No. 201)
- Domestic Energy Efficiency Grants (Amendment No. 4) Regulations (Northern Ireland) 2005 (S.R. 2005 No. 202)
- Criminal Justice Act 2003 (Retrial for Serious Offences) (Northern Ireland) Order 2005 (S.R. 2005 No. 203)
- Plant Health (Amendment) Order (Northern Ireland) 2005 (S.R. 2005 No. 204)
- Food Protection (Emergency Prohibitions) Order (Northern Ireland) 2005 (S.R. 2005 No. 205)
- Local Government Pension Scheme (Amendment) Regulations (Northern Ireland) 2005 (S.R. 2005 No. 206)
- Genetically Modified Organisms (Transboundary Movements) Regulations (Northern Ireland) 2005 (S.R. 2005 No. 209)
- Materials and Articles in Contact with Food Regulations (Northern Ireland) 2005 (S.R. 2005 No. 210)
- Road Transport (Passenger Vehicles Cabotage) Regulations (Northern Ireland) 2005 (S.R. 2005 No. 212)
- Unfair Arbitration Agreements (Specified Amount) Order (Northern Ireland) 2005 (S.R. 2005 No. 219)
- Children (Leaving Care) Regulations (Northern Ireland) 2005 (S.R. 2005 No. 221)
- Planning (Fees) Regulations (Northern Ireland) 2005 (S.R. 2005 No. 222)
- Health and Personal Social Services (2001 Act) (Commencement No. 7) Order (Northern Ireland) 2005 (S.R. 2005 No. 226)
- Registration of Social Care Workers (Relevant Registers) Regulations (Northern Ireland) 2005 (S.R. 2005 No. 227)
- Pollution Prevention and Control (Amendment) and Connected Provisions Regulations (Northern Ireland) 2005 (S.R. 2005 No. 229)
- Health and Personal Social Services (General Medical Services Contracts) (Miscellaneous Amendments) Regulations (Northern Ireland) 2005 (S.R. 2005 No. 230)
- Pharmaceutical Services and Charges for Drugs and Appliances (Amendment) Regulations (Northern Ireland) 2005 (S.R. 2005 No. 231)
- Food Protection (Emergency Prohibitions) (Revocation) Order (Northern Ireland) 2005 (S.R. 2005 No. 232)
- Feed (Corn Gluten Feed and Brewers Grains) (Emergency Control) Regulations (Northern Ireland) 2005 (S.R. 2005 No. 233)
- Salaries (Assembly Ombudsman and Commissioner for Complaints) (No. 2) Order (Northern Ireland) 2005 (S.R. 2005 No. 234)
- Road Transport (Working Time) Regulations (Northern Ireland) 2005 (S.R. 2005 No. 241)
- Criminal Justice (Evidence) (Northern Ireland) Order 2004 (Commencement No. 2) Order 2005 (S.R. 2005 No. 242)
- Criminal Justice (Northern Ireland) Order 2004 (Commencement No. 2) Order 2005 (S.R. 2005 No. 243)
- Education (1998 Order) (Commencement No. 5) Order (Northern Ireland) 2005 (S.R. 2005 No. 245)
- Education and Libraries (2003 Order) (Commencement No. 2) Order (Northern Ireland) 2005 (S.R. 2005 No. 246)
- Motor Hackney Carriages (Belfast) (Amendment) By-Laws (Northern Ireland) 2005 (S.R. 2005 No. 248)
- Motor Vehicles (Construction and Use) (Amendment No. 2) Regulations (Northern Ireland) 2005 (S.R. 2005 No. 249)
- Plant Health (Wood and Bark) (Phytophthora ramorum) Order (Northern Ireland) 2005 (S.R. 2005 No. 252)
- M2 Improvements (Sandyknowes to Greencastle) Order (Northern Ireland) 2005 (S.R. 2005 No. 255)
- Common Agricultural Policy Single Payment and Support Schemes Regulations (Northern Ireland) 2005 (S.R. 2005 No. 256)
- Street Works (Inspection Fees) Regulations (Northern Ireland) 2005 (S.R. 2005 No. 259)
- Road Traffic Offenders (Prescribed Devices) Order (Northern Ireland) 2005 (S.R. 2005 No. 263)
- Artificial Insemination of Cattle (Amendment) Regulations (Northern Ireland) 2005 (S.R. 2005 No. 264)
- Plant Health (Phytophthora ramorum) (Amendment) Order (Northern Ireland) 2005 (S.R. 2005 No. 265)
- Public Angling Estate Byelaws (Northern Ireland) 2005 (S.R. 2005 No. 267)
- Countryside Management Regulations (Northern Ireland) 2005 (S.R. 2005 No. 268)
- Lands Tribunal (Salaries) Order (Northern Ireland) 2005 (S.R. 2005 No. 269)
- Public Service Vehicles (Conditions of Fitness, Equipment and Use) (Amendment) Regulations (Northern Ireland) 2005 (S.R. 2005 No. 270)
- Genetically Modified Organisms (Traceability and Labelling) Regulations (Northern Ireland) 2005 (S.R. 2005 No. 271)
- Genetically Modified Organisms (Deliberate Release) (Amendment) Regulations (Northern Ireland) 2005 (S.R. 2005 No. 272)
- Local Government Pension Scheme (Amendment No. 2) Regulations (Northern Ireland) 2005 (S.R. 2005 No. 274)
- Rabies (Importation of Dogs, Cats and Other Mammals) (Amendment) Order (Northern Ireland) 2005 (S.R. 2005 No. 275)
- Environmentally Sensitive Areas Designation Order (Northern Ireland) 2005 (S.R. 2005 No. 276)
- Environmentally Sensitive Areas (Enforcement) Regulations (Northern Ireland) 2005 (S.R. 2005 No. 277)
- Information and Communication Technology Grant Scheme (Northern Ireland) 2005 (S.R. 2005 No. 278)
- Work at Height Regulations (Northern Ireland) 2005 (S.R. 2005 No. 279)
- Pensions (2005 Order) (Commencement No. 4) Order (Northern Ireland) 2005 (S.R. 2005 No. 280)
- Justice (Northern Ireland) Act 2002 (Commencement No. 9 and Transitional Provisions) Order 2005 (S.R. 2005 No. 281)
- Justice (Northern Ireland) Act 2004 (Commencement No. 3) Order 2005 (S.R. 2005 No. 282)
- Pension Protection Fund (Pension Protection Levies Consultation) Regulations (Northern Ireland) 2005 (S.R. 2005 No. 283)
- Food (Chilli, Chilli Products, Curcuma and Palm Oil) (Emergency Control) Regulations (Northern Ireland) 2005 (S.R. 2005 No. 284)
- Pollution Prevention and Control (Amendment) and Connected Provisions (No. 2) Regulations (Northern Ireland) 2005 (S.R. 2005 No. 285)
- Reporting of Prices of Milk Products Regulations (Northern Ireland) 2005 (S.R. 2005 No. 286)
- Electricity and Gas (Determination of Turnover for Penalties) Order (Northern Ireland) 2005 (S.R. 2005 No. 287)
- Kava-kava in Food Regulations (Northern Ireland) 2005 (S.R. 2005 No. 288)
- Student Fees (Amounts) Regulations (Northern Ireland) 2005 (S.R. 2005 No. 290)
- Contact Lens (Specification) and Sight Testing (Examination and Prescription) (Amendment) Regulations (Northern Ireland) 2005 (S.R. 2005 No. 291)
- General Ophthalmic Services (Amendment) Regulations (Northern Ireland) 2005 (S.R. 2005 No. 292)
- Disability Discrimination Codes of Practice (Employment and Occupation, and Trade Organisations and Qualifications Bodies) (Appointed Day) Order (Northern Ireland) 2005 (S.R. 2005 No. 293)
- Industrial Training Levy (Construction Industry) Order (Northern Ireland) 2005 (S.R. 2005 No. 294)
- Building (Amendment) Regulations (Northern Ireland) 2005 (S.R. 2005 No. 295)
- Dutch Potatoes (Notification) Order (Northern Ireland) 2005 (S.R. 2005 No. 296)
- Potatoes Originating in the Netherlands (Notification) (Revocation) Regulations (Northern Ireland) 2005 (S.R. 2005 No. 297)
- Education (Student Support) (Amendment) Regulations (Northern Ireland) 2005 (S.R. 2005 No. 298)
- Social Security (Shared Additional Pension) (Miscellaneous Amendments) Regulations (Northern Ireland) 2005 (S.R. 2005 No. 299)
- Hazardous Waste Regulations (Northern Ireland) 2005 (S.R. 2005 No. 300)

== 301-400 ==
- List of Wastes Regulations (Northern Ireland) 2005 (S.R. 2005 No. 301)
- Education (School Development Plans) Regulations (Northern Ireland) 2005 (S.R. 2005 No. 303)
- Control of Major Accident Hazards (Amendment) Regulations (Northern Ireland) 2005 (S.R. 2005 No. 305)
- Protection of Water Against Agricultural Nitrate Pollution (Amendment) Regulations (Northern Ireland) 2005 (S.R. 2005 No. 306)
- Legal Aid in Criminal Proceedings (Costs) (Amendment No. 2) Rules (Northern Ireland) 2005 (S.R. 2005 No. 307)
- Education (Supplement to the Special Educational Needs Code of Practice) (Appointed Day) (Northern Ireland) Order 2005 (S.R. 2005 No. 309)
- Common Agricultural Policy Single Payment and Support Schemes (Set-aside) Regulations (Northern Ireland) 2005 (S.R. 2005 No. 310)
- General Dental Services (Amendment) Regulations (Northern Ireland) 2005 (S.R. 2005 No. 311)
- Rules of the Supreme Court (Northern Ireland) (Amendment No. 4) 2005 (S.R. 2005 No. 314)
- Children (Leaving Care) (2002 Act) (Commencement No. 2 and Consequential Provisions) Order (Northern Ireland) 2005 (S.R. 2005 No. 319)
- Planning (Hazardous Substances) (Amendment) Regulations (Northern Ireland) 2005 (S.R. 2005 No. 320)
- Pensions (2005 Order) (Commencement No. 5 and Appointed Day) Order (Northern Ireland) 2005 (S.R. 2005 No. 321)
- Education (Student Support) (Amendment) (No. 2) Regulations (Northern Ireland) 2005 (S.R. 2005 No. 323)
- Children (Leaving Care) Social Security Benefits Regulations (Northern Ireland) 2005 (S.R. 2005 No. 324)
- Passenger and Goods Vehicles (Recording Equipment) (Amendment) Regulations (Northern Ireland) 2005 (S.R. 2005 No. 325)
- Court Security Officers (Designation and Employment) Regulations (Northern Ireland) 2005 (S.R. 2005 No. 326)
- Whole of Government Accounts (Designation of Bodies) (Northern Ireland) Order 2005 (S.R. 2005 No. 327)
- Producer Responsibility Obligations (Packaging Waste) (Amendment) Regulations (Northern Ireland) 2005 (S.R. 2005 No. 329)
- Fish Health (Amendment) Regulations (Northern Ireland) 2005 (S.R. 2005 No. 330)
- Housing Benefit (General) (Amendment) Regulations (Northern Ireland) 2005 (S.R. 2005 No. 331)
- Social Security (Students and Income-related Benefits) (Amendment) Regulations (Northern Ireland) 2005 (S.R. 2005 No. 332)
- Electricity Order 1992 (Amendment) Regulations (Northern Ireland) 2005 (S.R. 2005 No. 335)
- Special Educational Needs and Disability (2005 Order) (Commencement No. 1) Order (Northern Ireland) 2005 (S.R. 2005 No. 336)
- Special Educational Needs and Disability (2005 Order) (Commencement No. 2) Order (Northern Ireland) 2005 (S.R. 2005 No. 337)
- Special Educational Needs and Disability Tribunal Regulations (Northern Ireland) 2005 (S.R. 2005 No. 339)
- Education (Student Support) Regulations (Northern Ireland) 2005 (S.R. 2005 No. 340)
- Police Service of Northern Ireland (Complaints etc.) (Amendment) Regulations 2005 (S.R. 2005 No. 341)
- Pension Protection Fund (PPF Ombudsman) (Amendment) Order (Northern Ireland) 2005 (S.R. 2005 No. 342)
- Pension Protection Fund (Investigation by PPF Ombudsman of Complaints of Maladministration) Regulations (Northern Ireland) 2005 (S.R. 2005 No. 343)
- Pension Protection Fund (Reference of Reviewable Matters to the PPF Ombudsman) Regulations (Northern Ireland) 2005 (S.R. 2005 No. 344)
- Employment Relations (2004 Order) (Commencement No. 3 and Transitional Provisions) Order (Northern Ireland) 2005 (S.R. 2005 No. 345)
- Shrimp Fishing Nets Order (Northern Ireland) 2005 (S.R. 2005 No. 349)
- Sea Fishing (Restriction on Days at Sea) Order (Northern Ireland) 2005 (S.R. 2005 No. 350)
- Education (Student Loans) (Amendment) Regulations (Northern Ireland) 2005 (S.R. 2005 No. 351)
- Planning (Amendment) (2003 Order) (Commencement No. 4) Order (Northern Ireland) 2005 (S.R. 2005 No. 352)
- Planning (Modification and Discharge of Planning Agreements) Regulations (Northern Ireland) 2005 (S.R. 2005 No. 353)
- Food Hygiene Regulations (Northern Ireland) 2005 (S.R. 2005 No. 356)
- Occupational Pension Schemes (Miscellaneous Amendments) Regulations (Northern Ireland) 2005 (S.R. 2005 No. 357)
- Misuse of Drugs (Designation) (Amendment) Order (Northern Ireland) 2005 (S.R. 2005 No. 359)
- Misuse of Drugs (Amendment) (No. 2) Regulations (Northern Ireland) 2005 (S.R. 2005 No. 360)
- Grammar Schools (Charges) (Amendment) Regulations (Northern Ireland) 2005 (S.R. 2005 No. 361)
- Social Security (Claims and Payments) (Amendment No. 3) Regulations (Northern Ireland) 2005 (S.R. 2005 No. 362)
- Occupational Pension Schemes (Winding Up) (Modification for Multi-employer Schemes and Miscellaneous Amendments) Regulations (Northern Ireland) 2005 (S.R. 2005 No. 363)
- Pension Protection Fund (Entry Rules) (Amendment) Regulations (Northern Ireland) 2005 (S.R. 2005 No. 364)
- Education Student Fees (Approved Plans) Regulations (Northern Ireland) 2005 (S.R. 2005 No. 367)
- Health and Personal Social Services (Primary Medical Services) (Miscellaneous Amendments) Regulations (Northern Ireland) 2005 (S.R. 2005 No. 368)
- General Medical Services Transitional and Consequential Provisions (No.2) (Amendment) Order (Northern Ireland) 2005 (S.R. 2005 No. 369)
- Seed Potatoes (Tuber and Label Fees) (Amendment) Regulations (Northern Ireland) 2005 (S.R. 2005 No. 370)
- Special Educational Needs and Disability (Educational Institutions) (Alteration of Leasehold Premises) Regulations (Northern Ireland) 2005 (S.R. 2005 No. 371)
- Marketing of Potatoes (Amendment) Regulations (Northern Ireland) 2005 (S.R. 2005 No. 372)
- Plant Health (Import Inspection Fees) Regulations (Northern Ireland) 2005 (S.R. 2005 No. 373)
- Income-related Benefits (Amendment) Regulations (Northern Ireland) 2005 (S.R. 2005 No. 374)
- Pensions (2005 Order) (Pensions Compensation Board Transitional Adaptations and Savings) Order (Northern Ireland) 2005 (S.R. 2005 No. 375)
- Industrial Tribunals (Constitution and Rules of Procedure) (Amendment) Regulations (Northern Ireland) 2005 (S.R. 2005 No. 376)
- Occupational Pension Schemes (Equal Treatment) (Amendment) Regulations (Northern Ireland) 2005 (S.R. 2005 No. 377)
- Pensions Regulator (Financial Support Directions, etc.) Regulations (Northern Ireland) 2005 (S.R. 2005 No. 378)
- Education (Listed Bodies) (Amendment) (Northern Ireland) Order 2005 (S.R. 2005 No. 379)
- Plant Health (Import Inspection Fees) (Wood and Bark) Regulations (Northern Ireland) 2005 (S.R. 2005 No. 380)
- Occupational Pension Schemes (Fraud Compensation Payments and Miscellaneous Amendments) Regulations (Northern Ireland) 2005 (S.R. 2005 No. 381)
- Criminal Justice (Northern Ireland) Order 2005 (Commencement No. 1) Order 2005 (S.R. 2005 No. 382)
- Age-Related Payments Regulations (Northern Ireland) 2005 (S.R. 2005 No. 383)
- Education (Special Educational Needs) Regulations (Northern Ireland) 2005 (S.R. 2005 No. 384)
- Honey (Amendment) Regulations (Northern Ireland) 2005 (S.R. 2005 No. 385)
- Travelling Expenses and Remission of Charges (Amendment No.2) Regulations (Northern Ireland) 2005 (S.R. 2005 No. 386)
- Occupational Pension Schemes (Employer Debt, etc.) (Amendment) Regulations (Northern Ireland) 2005 (S.R. 2005 No. 387)
- Justice (Northern Ireland) Act 2002 (Commencement No. 10) Order 2005 (S.R. 2005 No. 391)
- Employer's Liability (Compulsory Insurance) (Amendment No. 2) Regulations (Northern Ireland) 2005 (S.R. 2005 No. 392)
- Social Security (Tax Credits) (Amendment) Regulations (Northern Ireland) 2005 (S.R. 2005 No. 393)
- Employment Relations (1999 Order) (Commencement No. 8) Order (Northern Ireland) 2005 (S.R. 2005 No. 394)
- Conduct of Employment Agencies and Employment Businesses Regulations (Northern Ireland) 2005 (S.R. 2005 No. 395)
- Food Labelling (Amendment No. 2) Regulations (Northern Ireland) 2005 (S.R. 2005 No. 396)
- Control of Vibration at Work Regulations (Northern Ireland) 2005 (S.R. 2005 No. 397)
- Bankruptcy (Financial Services and Markets Act 2000) Rules (Northern Ireland) 2005 (S.R. 2005 No. 398)
- Insurers (Winding-Up) Rules (Northern Ireland) 2005 (S.R. 2005 No. 399)
- Foyle Area and Carlingford Area (Close Seasons for Angling) (Amendment) Regulations 2005 (S.R. 2005 No. 400)

== 401-500 ==
- Pesticides (Maximum Residue Levels in Crops, Food and Feeding Stuffs) (Amendment No. 2) Regulations (Northern Ireland) 2005 (S.R. 2005 No. 401)
- Motor Vehicles (Construction and Use) (Amendment No. 3) Regulations (Northern Ireland) 2005 (S.R. 2005 No. 402)
- Motor Vehicles (Driving Licences) (Amendment) (Test Fees) Regulations (Northern Ireland) 2005 (S.R. 2005 No. 403)
- Motor Vehicle Testing (Amendment) (Fees) Regulations (Northern Ireland) 2005 (S.R. 2005 No. 404)
- Public Service Vehicles (Licence Fees) (Amendment) Regulations (Northern Ireland) 2005 (S.R. 2005 No. 405)
- Goods Vehicles (Testing) (Fees) (Amendment) Regulations (Northern Ireland) 2005 (S.R. 2005 No. 406)
- Farm Nutrient Management (Amendment) Scheme (Northern Ireland) 2005 (S.R. 2005 No. 407)
- Food Safety (General Food Hygiene) (Amendment) Regulations (Northern Ireland) 2005 (S.R. 2005 No. 408)
- Motor Vehicle Testing (Amendment) Regulations (Northern Ireland) 2005 (S.R. 2005 No. 409)
- Pensions (2005 Order) (Commencement No. 6) Order (Northern Ireland) 2005 (S.R. 2005 No. 411)
- Occupational Pension Schemes (Trust and Retirement Benefits Exemption) Regulations (Northern Ireland) 2005 (S.R. 2005 No. 412)
- Pension Schemes (Categories) Regulations (Northern Ireland) 2005 (S.R. 2005 No. 413)
- Social Security (Incapacity Benefit Work-focused Interviews) Regulations (Northern Ireland) 2005 (S.R. 2005 No. 414)
- Social Security (Incapacity) (Miscellaneous Amendments) Regulations (Northern Ireland) 2005 (S.R. 2005 No. 415)
- Registration of Fish Buyers and Sellers and Designation of Fish Auction Sites Regulations (Northern Ireland) 2005 (S.R. 2005 No. 419)
- Lay Visitors' Reports Order 2005 (S.R. 2005 No. 420)
- Occupational Pension Schemes (Administration and Audited Accounts) (Amendment) Regulations (Northern Ireland) 2005 (S.R. 2005 No. 421)
- Social Security (Miscellaneous Amendments No. 2) Regulations (Northern Ireland) 2005 (S.R. 2005 No. 424)
- Employment Equality (Sex Discrimination) Regulations (Northern Ireland) 2005 (S.R. 2005 No. 426)
- Planning (General Development) (Amendment) Order (Northern Ireland) 2005 (S.R. 2005 No. 427)
- Traffic Signs (Amendment) Regulations (Northern Ireland) 2005 (S.R. 2005 No. 428)
- Probation Board for Northern Ireland Victim Information Scheme 2005 (S.R. 2005 No. 432)
- Civil Partnership (Contracted-out Occupational and Appropriate Personal Pension Schemes) (Surviving Civil Partners) Order (Northern Ireland) 2005 (S.R. 2005 No. 433)
- Civil Partnership (Pensions and Benefit Payments) (Consequential, etc. Provisions) Order (Northern Ireland) 2005 (S.R. 2005 No. 434)
- Education (Student Loans) (Amendment) (No. 2) Regulations (Northern Ireland) 2005 (S.R. 2005 No. 435)
- Transmissible Spongiform Encephalopathy (Amendment No. 3) Regulations (Northern Ireland) 2005 (S.R. 2005 No. 436)
- Smoke Control Areas (Exempted Fireplaces) (Amendment) Regulations (Northern Ireland) 2005 (S.R. 2005 No. 437)
- Bovine Products (Restriction on Placing on the Market) Regulations (Northern Ireland) 2005 (S.R. 2005 No. 439)
- Tryptophan in Food Regulations (Northern Ireland) 2005 (S.R. 2005 No. 440)
- Passenger and Goods Vehicles (Recording Equipment) (Amendment No. 2) Regulations (Northern Ireland) 2005 (S.R. 2005 No. 441)
- Pensions Ombudsman (Disclosure of Information) (Amendment of Specified Persons) Order (Northern Ireland) 2005 (S.R. 2005 No. 442)
- Social Security (Work-focused Interviews Amendment) Regulations (Northern Ireland) 2005 (S.R. 2005 No. 443)
- Housing Benefit (Miscellaneous Amendments No. 3) Regulations (Northern Ireland) 2005 (S.R. 2005 No. 444)
- Education (Student Support) (2005 Regulations) (Amendment) Regulations (Northern Ireland) 2005 (S.R. 2005 No. 445)
- Animals and Animal Products (Import and Export) (Amendment) Regulations (Northern Ireland) 2005 (S.R. 2005 No. 446)
- Social Fund (Cold Weather Payments) (General) (Amendment) Regulations (Northern Ireland) 2005 (S.R. 2005 No. 447)
- Rules of the Supreme Court (Northern Ireland) (Amendment No. 5) 2005 (S.R. 2005 No. 449)
- Beef Labelling (Enforcement) (Amendment) Regulations (Northern Ireland) 2005 (S.R. 2005 No. 450)
- Animals and Animal Products (Examination for Residues and Maximum Residue Limits) (Amendment) Regulations (Northern Ireland) 2005 (S.R. 2005 No. 451)
- Sea Fishing (Enforcement of Community Satellite Monitoring Measures) (Northern Ireland) Order 2005 (S.R. 2005 No. 452)
- Pollution Prevention and Control (Amendment) (No. 3) Regulations (Northern Ireland) 2005 (S.R. 2005 No. 454)
- Regulation and Improvement Authority (Inspection of Children, Records and Schools) Regulations (Northern Ireland) 2005 (S.R. 2005 No. 455)
- Eel Fishing (Licence Duties) Regulations (Northern Ireland) 2005 (S.R. 2005 No. 456)
- Social Security (Residential Care Homes, Nursing Homes and Independent Hospitals) Regulations (Northern Ireland) 2005 (S.R. 2005 No. 458)
- Housing Benefit (General) (Amendment No. 2) Regulations (Northern Ireland) 2005 (S.R. 2005 No. 459)
- Potatoes Originating in Egypt (Amendment) Regulations (Northern Ireland) 2005 (S.R. 2005 No. 460)
- Hazardous Waste (Amendment) Regulations (Northern Ireland) 2005 (S.R. 2005 No. 461)
- List of Wastes (Amendment) Regulations (Northern Ireland) 2005 (S.R. 2005 No. 462)
- Chemicals (Hazard Information and Packaging for Supply) (Amendment) Regulations (Northern Ireland) 2005 (S.R. 2005 No. 463)
- Local Government (2005 Order) (Commencement No. 1) Order (Northern Ireland) 2005 (S.R. 2005 No. 465)
- Students Awards (Amendment) Regulations (Northern Ireland) 2005 (S.R. 2005 No. 466)
- Protected Rights (Transfer Payment) (Amendment) Regulations (Northern Ireland) 2005 (S.R. 2005 No. 467)
- Agriculture (Weather Aid 2002) Scheme (Northern Ireland) 2005 (S.R. 2005 No. 468)
- Taxis (Dromore) Bye-Laws (Northern Ireland) 2005 (S.R. 2005 No. 469)
- Civil Partnership (Miscellaneous and Consequential Provisions) Order (Northern Ireland) 2005 (S.R. 2005 No. 471)
- Measuring Equipment (Liquid Fuel and Lubricants) (Amendment) Regulations (Northern Ireland) 2005 (S.R. 2005 No. 472)
- Legal Aid (Costs of Successful Unassisted Parties) (Amendment) Regulations (Northern Ireland) 2005 (S.R. 2005 No. 473)
- Legal Aid (General) (Amendment) Regulations (Northern Ireland) 2005 (S.R. 2005 No. 474)
- Food Labelling (Amendment No. 2) (Amendment) Regulations (Northern Ireland) 2005 (S.R. 2005 No. 475)
- Births, Deaths, Marriages and Civil Partnerships (Fees) Order (Northern Ireland) 2005 (S.R. 2005 No. 478)
- Civil Partnership Act 2004 (Consequential Amendments) Order (Northern Ireland) 2005 (S.R. 2005 No. 479)
- Courses for Drink-Drive Offenders (Experimental Period) (Termination of Restrictions) Order (Northern Ireland) 2005 (S.R. 2005 No. 481)
- Civil Partnership Regulations (Northern Ireland) 2005 (S.R. 2005 No. 482)
- Dissolution etc. (Pensions) Regulations (Northern Ireland) 2005 (S.R. 2005 No. 484)
- Avian Influenza (Preventive Measures) Regulations (Northern Ireland) 2005 (S.R. 2005 No. 485)
- Avian Influenza (Preventive Measures in Zoos) Regulations (Northern Ireland) 2005 (S.R. 2005 No. 486)
- Traffic Signs (Amendment No. 2) Regulations (Northern Ireland) 2005 (S.R. 2005 No. 487)
- Salaries (Comptroller and Auditor General) (No. 2) Order (Northern Ireland) 2005 (S.R. 2005 No. 489)
- Housing Benefit (Miscellaneous Amendments No. 4) Regulations (Northern Ireland) 2005 (S.R. 2005 No. 493)
- Law Reform (Miscellaneous Provisions) (2005 Order) (Commencement and Transitional Saving) Order (Northern Ireland) 2005 (S.R. 2005 No. 494)
- Teachers' Superannuation (Amendment) (No. 2) Regulations (Northern Ireland) 2005 (S.R. 2005 No. 495)
- Social Security (Inherited SERPS) (Amendments relating to Civil Partnership) Regulations (Northern Ireland) 2005 (S.R. 2005 No. 496)
- Family Proceedings (Amendment No. 2) Rules (Northern Ireland) 2005 (S.R. 2005 No. 497)
- Family Proceedings (Civil Partnership: Staying of Proceedings) Rules (Northern Ireland) 2005 (S.R. 2005 No. 498)
- Civil Partnership Proceedings County Courts Order (Northern Ireland) 2005 (S.R. 2005 No. 499)
- Legal Aid in Criminal Cases (Statement of Means) (Amendment) Rules (Northern Ireland) 2005 (S.R. 2005 No. 500)

== 501-600 ==
- Legal Aid (Assessment of Resources) (Amendment) Regulations (Northern Ireland) 2005 (S.R. 2005 No. 501)
- Legal Advice and Assistance (Amendment No. 2) Regulations (Northern Ireland) 2005 (S.R. 2005 No. 502)
- Access to Justice (Northern Ireland) Order 2003 (Commencement No. 4) Order (Northern Ireland) 2005 (S.R. 2005 No. 503)
- Prisoner Release Victim Information (Northern Ireland) (Amendment) Scheme 2005 (S.R. 2005 No. 504)
- Planning (Fees) (Amendment) Regulations (Northern Ireland) 2005 (S.R. 2005 No. 505)
- Social Fund Maternity and Funeral Expenses (General) Regulations (Northern Ireland) 2005 (S.R. 2005 No. 506)
- Occupational and Personal Pension Schemes (Civil Partnership) (Miscellaneous Amendments) Regulations (Northern Ireland) 2005 (S.R. 2005 No. 507)
- Occupational Pensions (Revaluation) Order (Northern Ireland) 2005 (S.R. 2005 No. 509)
- State Pension Credit (Amendment) Regulations (Northern Ireland) 2005 (S.R. 2005 No. 513)
- Company Directors Disqualification (Amendment) (2005 Order) (Commencement) Order (Northern Ireland) 2005 (S.R. 2005 No. 514)
- Bovine Products (Restriction on Placing on the Market) (No. 2) Regulations (Northern Ireland) 2005 (S.R. 2005 No. 515)
- Weights and Measures (Miscellaneous Foods) (Amendment) Order (Northern Ireland) 2005 (S.R. 2005 No. 516)
- Insolvent Companies (Disqualification of Unfit Directors) Proceedings (Amendment) Rules (Northern Ireland) 2005 (S.R. 2005 No. 517)
- Taxis (Strabane) (Amendment) Bye-Laws (Northern Ireland) 2005 (S.R. 2005 No. 518)
- Welfare Foods (Amendment No. 2) Regulations (Northern Ireland) 2005 (S.R. 2005 No. 519)
- Civil Partnership Act 2004 (Amendments to Subordinate Legislation) Order (Northern Ireland) 2005 (S.R. 2005 No. 520)
- Education (Listed Bodies) (Amendment) (No.2) Order (Northern Ireland) 2005 (S.R. 2005 No. 521)
- Education (Recognised Bodies) Order (Northern Ireland) 2005 (S.R. 2005 No. 522)
- Health and Safety (Fees) Regulations (Northern Ireland) 2005 (S.R. 2005 No. 523)
- Fishery Products (Official Controls Charges) Regulations (Northern Ireland) 2005 (S.R. 2005 No. 524)
- Fair Employment (Specification of Public Authorities) (Amendment) Order (Northern Ireland) 2005 (S.R. 2005 No. 525)
- Plant Protection Products Regulations (Northern Ireland) 2005 (S.R. 2005 No. 526)
- Civil Partnership (Treatment of Overseas Relationships) Order (Northern Ireland) 2005 (S.R. 2005 No. 531)
- Civil Partnership Act 2004 (Amendments to Subordinate Legislation) (No. 2) Order (Northern Ireland) 2005 (S.R. 2005 No. 532)
- Health and Personal Social Services (Superannuation Scheme, Injury Benefits, Additional Voluntary Contributions and Compensation for Premature Retirement) (Civil Partnership) (Amendment) Regulations (Northern Ireland) 2005 (S.R. 2005 No. S.R. 2005 No. 533)
- Health and Personal Social Services (Superannuation) (Amendment No. 2) Regulations (Northern Ireland) 2005 (S.R. 2005 No. S.R. 2005 No. 534)
- Sheep and Goats (Records, Identification and Movement) Order (Northern Ireland) 2005 (S.R. 2005 No. 535)
- Civil Partnership (Pensions, Social Security and Child Support) (Consequential, etc. Provisions) Order (Northern Ireland) 2005 (S.R. 2005 No. 536)
- Railways Infrastructure (Access, Management and Licensing of Railway Undertakings) Regulations (Northern Ireland) 2005 (S.R. 2005 No. 537)
- Contaminants in Food Regulations (Northern Ireland) 2005 (S.R. 2005 No. 538)
- Social Security (Civil Partnership) (Consequential Amendments) Regulations (Northern Ireland) 2005 (S.R. 2005 No. 539)
- Financial Assistance for Young Farmers Scheme (Amendment) Order (Northern Ireland) 2005 (S.R. 2005 No. 540)
- Social Security (Retirement Pensions and Graduated Retirement Benefit) (Widowers and Civil Partnership) Regulations (Northern Ireland) 2005 (S.R. 2005 No. 541)
- Civil Partnership Act 2004 (Relationships Arising Through Civil Partnership) Order (Northern Ireland) 2005 (S.R. 2005 No. 542)
- Pensions (2005 Order) (Commencement No. 7) Order (Northern Ireland) 2005 (S.R. 2005 No. 543)
- Social Security (Reciprocal Agreements) Order (Northern Ireland) 2005 (S.R. 2005 No. 544)
- Feeding Stuffs Regulations (Northern Ireland) 2005 (S.R. 2005 No. 545)
- Feed (Hygiene and Enforcement) Regulations (Northern Ireland) 2005 (S.R. 2005 No. 546)
- Police Service of Northern Ireland Regulations 2005 (S.R. 2005 No. 547)
- Fisheries (Amendment) Byelaws (Northern Ireland) 2005 (S.R. 2005 No. 548)
- Meat (Official Controls Charges) Regulations (Northern Ireland) 2005 (S.R. 2005 No. 549)
- Income-related Benefits (Amendment No. 2) Regulations (Northern Ireland) 2005 (S.R. 2005 No. 550)
- Provision of Health Services to Persons not Ordinarily Resident Regulations (Northern Ireland) 2005 (S.R. 2005 No. 551)
- Non-Domestic Rating (Hardship Relief) Regulations (Northern Ireland) 2005 (S.R. 2005 No. 552)
- Rates (Amendment) Regulations (Northern Ireland) 2005 (S.R. 2005 No. 553)
- Products of Animal Origin (Third Country Imports) (Amendment) Regulations (Northern Ireland) 2005 (S.R. 2005 No. 554)
- Meat (Examinations for Residues) (Charges) Regulations (Northern Ireland) 2005 (S.R. 2005 No. 556)
- Family Proceedings (Amendment No. 3) Rules (Northern Ireland) 2005 (S.R. 2005 No. 558)
- Magistrates' Courts (Miscellaneous Amendments) Rules (Northern Ireland) 2005 (S.R. 2005 No. 559)
- Family Proceedings Fees (Amendment) Order (Northern Ireland) 2005 (S.R. 2005 No. 560)
- Supreme Court Fees (Amendment) Order (Northern Ireland) 2005 (S.R. 2005 No. 561)
- Foyle Area and Carlingford Area (Licensing of Fishing Engines) (Amendment) Regulations 2005 (S.R. 2005 No. 562)
- Misuse of Drugs and the Misuse of Drugs (Notification of and Supply to Addicts) (Amendment) Regulations (Northern Ireland) 2005 (S.R. 2005 No. 564)
- Health and Personal Social Services (Superannuation Scheme and Injury Benefits) (Amendment) Regulations (Northern Ireland) 2005 (S.R. 2005 No. S.R. 2005 No. 565)
- Street Works (1995 Order) (Commencement No. 7) Order (Northern Ireland) 2005 (S.R. 2005 No. S.R. 2005 No. 566)
- Occupational Pension Schemes (Internal Controls) Regulations (Northern Ireland) 2005 (S.R. 2005 No. 567)
- Occupational Pension Schemes (Scheme Funding) Regulations (Northern Ireland) 2005 5S.R. 2005 No. 568)
- Occupational Pension Schemes (Investment) Regulations (Northern Ireland) 2005 (S.R. 2005 No. 569)
- Occupational Pension Schemes (Regulatory Own Funds) Regulations (Northern Ireland) 2005 (S.R. 2005 No. 570)
- Employment Relations (2004 Order) (Commencement No. 4 and Transitional Provisions) Order (Northern Ireland) 2005 (S.R. 2005 No. 571)
- Official Feed and Food Controls Regulations (Northern Ireland) 2005 (S.R. 2005 No. 574)
- Industrial Tribunals (Constitution and Rules of Procedure) (Amendment) (No. 2) Regulations (Northern Ireland) 2005 (S.R. 2005 No. 578)
- Fair Employment Tribunal (Rules of Procedure) (Amendment) Regulations (Northern Ireland) 2005 (S.R. 2005 No. 579)
- Social Security (Hospital In-Patients) Regulations (Northern Ireland) 2005 (S.R. 2005 No. 580)
- Occupational Pension Schemes (Cross-border Activities) Regulations (Northern Ireland) 2005 (S.R. 2005 No. 581)
- Social Security (Payments on account, Overpayments and Recovery) (Amendment) Regulations (Northern Ireland) 2005 (S.R. 2005 No. 582)
- Salmonella in Broiler Flocks (Survey Powers) Regulations (Northern Ireland) 2005 (S.R. 2005 No. 584)
- Brucellosis Control (Amendment) Order (Northern Ireland) 2005 (S.R. 2005 No. 585)
- Older Cattle (Disposal) Regulations (Northern Ireland) 2005 (S.R. 2005 No. 586)
- Dogs (Licensing and Identification) (Amendment) Regulations (Northern Ireland) 2005 (S.R. 2005 No. 587)
- Landfill Allowances Scheme (Amendment) Regulations (Northern Ireland) 2005 (S.R. 2005 No. 588)
- Fire Services (Appointments and Promotion) (Revocation) Regulations (Northern Ireland) 2005 (S.R. 2005 No. 590)
