= Biological Weapons Act 1974 =

Act of the Parliament of the United Kingdom against bioweapons

Biological Weapons Act 1974 (Note: Section 7.)
- Act of Parliament
- Parliament of the United Kingdom
- Long title: An Act to prohibit the development, production, acquisition and possession of certain biological agents and toxins and of biological weapons.
- Citation: 1974 c. 6
- Introduced by: Robert Carr (Commons)
- Territorial extent: United Kingdom (Note: Section 6.)

Dates
- Royal assent: 8 February 1974
- Commencement: 8 February 1974 (Note: The Acts of Parliament (Commencement) Act 1793.)
Other legislation
Amends	Army Act 1955; Air Force Act 1955; Naval Discipline Act 1957; County Courts Act (Northern Ireland) 1959
Amended by	Criminal Jurisdiction Act 1975; Judicature (Northern Ireland) Act 1978; Police and Criminal Evidence Act 1984; Police and Criminal Evidence (Northern Ireland) Order 1989; Anti-terrorism, Crime and Security Act 2001; Justice (Northern Ireland) Act 2002; Commissioners for Revenue and Customs Act 2005; Serious Organised Crime and Police Act 2005; Public Bodies (Merger of the Director of Public Prosecutions and the Director of Revenue and Customs Prosecutions) Order 2014

Status: Amended

Text of statute as originally enacted

Revised text of statute as amended

Text of the Biological Weapons Act 1974 as in force today (including any amendments) within the United Kingdom, from legislation.gov.uk.

The Biological Weapons Act 1974 (c. 6) is an act of the Parliament of the United Kingdom, passed during the reign of Queen Elizabeth II on 8 February 1974, with the long title "An Act to prohibit the development, production, acquisition and possession of certain biological agents and toxins and of biological weapons."

The act makes illegal the development, production, acquisition or retainment of biological weapons, as well as any weapon delivery systems for the deployment of biological weapons. It also forbade the exchange between people of biological weapons and established the prison sentence for committing the crimes mentioned in the Act; a maximum sentence of life imprisonment.

The act extends to anyone within the United Kingdom, or British citizens abroad, however the citizen must be within the United Kingdom, the Isle of Man or any of the British colonies to be arrested for the offense.

It also gives Customs and Excise officers the power to seize biological weapons coming in or out of the United Kingdom, or British citizens in other countries transporting biological weaponry for deportation to the UK.

A fourth section says that anyone may be charged (as with other crimes) with aiding and abetting or conspiring to transport biological weapons.

The act extends to the entire United Kingdom.
