= Justice (Northern Ireland) Act 2002 =

Act of the Parliament of the United Kingdom

Justice (Northern Ireland) Act 2002 (Note: Section 93.)
- Act of Parliament
- Parliament of the United Kingdom
- Long title: An Act to make provision about the judiciary in Northern Ireland and to amend section 6 of the Appellate Jurisdiction Act 1876; to make provision about the law officers and other legal officers and the courts in Northern Ireland; to establish a Public Prosecution Service for Northern Ireland, a Chief Inspector of Criminal Justice in Northern Ireland and a Northern Ireland Law Commission; to amend the law of youth justice in Northern Ireland; to make provision for making available to victims of crime information about the release of offenders in Northern Ireland; to make provision about community safety in Northern Ireland; to amend the law of legal aid in Northern Ireland; and for connected purposes.
- Citation: 2002 c. 26
- Introduced by: John Reid MP (Commons); Gareth Williams, Baron Williams of Mostyn (Lords)
- Territorial extent: Northern Ireland (Note: Section 91.)

Dates
- Royal assent: 24 July 2002
- Commencement: (Note: Section 87.)
Other legislation
| Amends | List: Statutory Declarations Act 1835; Promissory Oaths Act 1868; Appellate Jurisdiction Act 1876; General Dealers (Ireland) Act 1903; Official Secrets Act 1911; Criminal Justice Act (Northern Ireland) 1945; Interpretation Act (Northern Ireland) 1954; Army Act 1955; Air Force Act 1955; Naval Discipline Act 1957; Coroners Act (Northern Ireland) 1959; County Courts Act (Northern Ireland) 1959; Electoral Law Act (Northern Ireland) 1962; Magistrates' Courts Act (Northern Ireland) 1964; Magistrates' Courts Act (Northern Ireland) 1964; Lands Tribunal and Compensation Act (Northern Ireland) 1964; Law Commissions Act 1965; Marine, &c., Broadcasting (Offences) Act 1967; Children and Young Persons Act (Northern Ireland) 1968; Costs in Criminal Cases Act (Northern Ireland) 1968; Treatment of Offenders Act (Northern Ireland) 1968; Genocide Act 1969; Grand Jury (Abolition) Act (Northern Ireland) 1969; Administration of Justice Act 1973; Northern Ireland Constitution Act 1973; Northern Ireland (Modification of Enactments -No. 1) Order 1973; Biological Weapons Act 1974; House of Commons Disqualification Act 1975; Criminal Jurisdiction Act 1975; Northern Ireland Assembly Disqualification Act 1975; Energy Act 1976; Internationally Protected Persons Act 1978; Judicature (Northern Ireland) Act 1978; Suppression of Terrorism Act 1978; Interpretation Act 1978; Rehabilitation of Offenders (Northern Ireland) Order 1978; Pollution Control and Local Government (Northern Ireland) Order 1978; Criminal Appeal (Northern Ireland) Act 1980; County Courts (Northern Ireland) Order 1980; Criminal Justice (Northern Ireland) Order 1980; Legal Aid, Advice and Assistance (Northern Ireland) Order 1981; Magistrates' Courts (Northern Ireland) Order 1981; Civil Aviation Act 1982; Administration of Justice Act 1982; Probation Board (Northern Ireland) Order 1982; Nuclear Material (Offences) Act 1983; Child Abduction (Northern Ireland) Order 1985; Mental Health (Northern Ireland) Order 1986; Criminal Justice Act 1987; Criminal Justice Act 1988; Official Secrets Act 1989; Insolvency (Northern Ireland) Order 1989; Treatment of Offenders (Northern Ireland) Order 1989; Police and Criminal Evidence (Northern Ireland) Order 1989; Courts and Legal Services Act 1990; Iraq and Kuwait (United Nations Sanctions) Order 1990; Child Support Act 1991; Food Safety (Northern Ireland) Order 1991; Criminal Justice (Northern Ireland) Order 1991; Social Security Administration (Northern Ireland) Act 1992; Social Security Contributions and Benefits (Northern Ireland) Act 1992; Registered Homes (Northern Ireland) Order 1992; Radioactive Substances Act 1993; Family Law (Northern Ireland) Order 1993; Criminal Justice (Northern Ireland) Order 1994; Criminal Appeal Act 1995; Criminal Procedure (Scotland) Act 1995; Children (Northern Ireland) Order 1995; Chemical Weapons Act 1996; Criminal Procedure and Investigations Act 1996; Education (Northern Ireland) Order 1996; Criminal Justice (Northern Ireland) Order 1996; Juries (Northern Ireland) Order 1996; Sex Offenders Act 1997; Law Officers Act 1997; Police (Northern Ireland) Act 1998; Human Rights Act 1998; Scotland Act 1998; Government of Wales Act 1998; Northern Ireland Act 1998; Fair Employment and Treatment (Northern Ireland) Order 1998; Criminal Justice (Children) (Northern Ireland) Order 1998; Social Security (Northern Ireland) Order 1998; Fair Employment and Treatment (Northern Ireland) Order 1998; Access to Justice Act 1999; Criminal Evidence (Northern Ireland) Order 1999; Welfare Reform and Pensions (Northern Ireland) Order 1999; Northern Ireland Act 2000; Terrorism Act 2000; Regulation of Investigatory Powers Act 2000; Freedom of Information Act 2000; Flags (Northern Ireland) Order 2000; Flags Regulations (Northern Ireland) 2000; Regulatory Reform Act 2001; Anti-terrorism, Crime and Security Act 2001; Life Sentences (Northern Ireland) Order 2001 |
| Repeals/revokes | Prosecution of Offences (Northern Ireland) Order 1972 |
| Amended by | Justice (Northern Ireland) Act 2004; Terrorism (Northern Ireland) Act 2006; Terrorism Act 2006; Wireless Telegraphy Act 2006; Government of Wales Act 2006; Northern Ireland (Miscellaneous Provisions) Act 2006; Northern Ireland Act 2009; Investigatory Powers Act 2016 |

Status: Amended

Text of statute as originally enacted

Revised text of statute as amended

The Justice (Northern Ireland) Act 2002 (c. 26) is an act of the Parliament of the United Kingdom devolving certain responsibilities for justice to the Northern Ireland Assembly, establishing certain institutions and establishing certain youth justice measures to implement restorative justice.

== Background ==
In order to implement the Good Friday Agreement, responsibilities for justice were devolved

The act is the final product of the Criminal Justice Review.

Full implementation of the act was delayed due to the period of Direct Rule during 2002-2007.

== Provisions ==
- The act established the Youth Justice Agency
- The act established the Northern Ireland Youth Conferencing Service
- The act creates the new offices of Attorney General for Northern Ireland and the Advocate General for Northern Ireland
- The act established the Public Prosecution Service for Northern Ireland
- The act established the Criminal Justice Inspection Northern Ireland and the Chief Inspector for Criminal Justice
- The act established the Northern Ireland Law Commission
- The act established new community sentences
- The act established a statutory aim to "protect the public by preventing offending and reoffending by children" by encouraging children to "recognise the effects of crime and to take responsibility for their actions" and "furthering their personal, social and educational development"
- The act establishes the role of "lay magistrate" as part of the youth justice measures

The act also transfers the power to remove or suspend a person holding a listed judicial office, so that it is now exercisable by the Lord Chief Justice. At the time, there was some discomfort with the concept of "lay magistrate" among justices of the peace.

The youth justice measures have two types of disposal:

- diversionary conference: referred by the public prosecution service
- court-ordered conference

== Reception ==
The use of community sentences and youth conferences reduced the rate of reoffending.

The use of youth conferencing has been described as restorative justice.

== See also ==
- Northern Ireland Act 2000
- Police (Northern Ireland) Act 2000
- Police (Northern Ireland) Act 2003
- Justice (Northern Ireland) Act 2004
- Northern Ireland Act 2009
