= Terrorism (Northern Ireland) Act 2006 =

Act of the Parliament of the United Kingdom

Terrorism (Northern Ireland) Act 2006 (Note: Section 5(1).)
- Act of Parliament
- Parliament of the United Kingdom
- Long title: An Act to provide for Part 7 of the Terrorism Act 2000 to continue in force for a limited period after 18 February 2006 subject to modifications and to authorise the making of provision in connection with its ceasing to have effect; and for connected purposes.
- Citation: 2006 c. 2006 c 4
- Territorial extent: Northern Ireland (Note: Section 5(4).)

Dates
- Royal assent: 16 February 2006
- Commencement: 18 February 2006 (Note: Section 5(3).)
Other legislation
Amends	Police and Criminal Evidence (Northern Ireland) Order 1989; Terrorism Act 2000; Justice (Northern Ireland) Act 2002; Justice (Northern Ireland) Act 2004

Status: Current legislation

History of passage through Parliament

Text of statute as originally enacted

Revised text of statute as amended

The Terrorism (Northern Ireland) Act 2006 (c. 4) is an act of the Parliament of the United Kingdom. It provided that part 7 of the Terrorism Act 2000 allowing Diplock courts in Northern Ireland, which would otherwise have expired on 18 February 2006, would continue in force until 31 July 2007, subject to modifications.

== Background ==
The government had committed to the removal of all the special security provisions relating to Northern Ireland, when it was able to, considering the security situation.

== Passage ==
The bill for this act passed through its stages in the House of Commons and the House of Lords on the following dates.

	House of Commons	House of Lords
First Reading	11 October 2005	1 December 2005
Second Reading	31 October 2005	20 December 2005
Committee	8 November 2005	12 January 2006
Report	30 November 2005	30 January 2006
Third Reading	30 November 2005	14 February 2006

== Provisions ==
The act extended part 7 of the Terrorism Act 2000 until 31 July 2007, with a possibility for it to be extended for at most a year beyond that. The provisions related to non-jury Diplock courts.

== Reception ==
During the debate, the leader of the Democratic Unionist Party, Ian Paisley, criticised the Secretary of State for not being more sceptical of IRA disarmament.

== See also ==
- Terrorism Act (disambiguation)

== Bibliography ==
- "Terrorism (Northern Ireland) Act 2006". Current Law Statutes Annotated 2006. Sweet & Maxwell. London. W Green. Edinburgh. 2006. Volume 1. Chapter 4. pp 4-1 to 4-7.
- Halsbury's Statutes
