= Terrorism Act =

The Terrorism Act may refer to legislation in various countries:

== South Africa ==
- Terrorism Act No 83 of 1967

== United Kingdom ==
- Prevention of Terrorism Act (Northern Ireland), laws passed between 1974 and 1989 to deal with terrorism in Northern Ireland
- Terrorism Act 2000
- Anti-terrorism, Crime and Security Act 2001
- Prevention of Terrorism Act 2005
- Terrorism Act 2006
- Terrorism (Northern Ireland) Act 2006
- Terrorism (Protection of Premises) Act 2025

== See also ==
- Anti-terrorism legislation
- Category:Terrorism laws
