= Police and Criminal Evidence (Northern Ireland) Order 1989 =

United Kingdom statutory instrument

Police and Criminal Evidence (Northern Ireland) Order 1989 (Note: Section 1(1).)
- Statutory Instrument
- Parliament of the United Kingdom
- Citation: SI 1989/1341 (N.I. 12)
- Territorial extent: Northern Ireland

Dates
- Made: 2 August 1989
- Commencement: 2 September 1989 (Note: Section 1(2)–(4).)

Other legislation
- Amended by: Anti-terrorism, Crime and Security Act 2001; Justice (Northern Ireland) Act 2004; Prevention of Terrorism Act 2005; Terrorism (Northern Ireland) Act 2006; Wireless Telegraphy Act 2006; Counter-Terrorism Act 2008; Terrorism Prevention and Investigation Measures Act 2011; National Security Act 2023
- Relates to: {{Police and Criminal Evidence Act 1984}}

Status: Amended

Text of statute as originally enacted

Revised text of statute as amended

Text of the Police and Criminal Evidence (Northern Ireland) Order 1989 as in force today (including any amendments) within the United Kingdom, from legislation.gov.uk.

The Police and Criminal Evidence (Northern Ireland) Order 1989 (SI 1989/1341) is a statutory instrument of the United Kingdom which instituted a legislative framework for the powers of police officers in Northern Ireland similar to the framework for the powers introduced in England and Wales by the Police and Criminal Evidence Act 1984.

== Background ==
The order was drafted in response to a 1980 royal commission.

== Provisions ==
The order provides the power to obtain a custody image and also contains the requirements on the use of that image. The police cannot seize a document under the order unless they have "reasonable suspicion that it is evidence and its retention is necessary". The order allows for the use of stop and search powers in some situations.
