= Child Support Act 1991 =

Act of Parliament in New Zealand

Child Support Act

New Zealand Parliament
- Long title: An Act— (a)To assess the minimum level of financial support payable by certain parents in respect of their children; and (b)To provide for the collection and payment of child support and spousal maintenance payments; and (c)To make transitional arrangements relating to maintenance liabilities under the Social Security Act 1964 and the Family Proceedings Act 1980
- Administered by: Inland Revenue Department

Legislative history
- Passed: 1991
- Status: Current legislation

The Child Support Act is an Act of the New Zealand Parliament that was passed in 1991.

It was passed to reform the legislation around domestic maintenance payments that, at the time, was perceived as being ineffective.

The new legislation enabled custodial parents and caregivers to apply directly to the Inland Revenue Department for assistance in gathering and being paid child support that was owed by a liable parent, rather than needing to hold a Court Hearing.
