= Fair Employment and Treatment (Northern Ireland) Order 1998 =

Northern Ireland Order in Council

Fair Employment and Treatment (Northern Ireland) Order 1998 (Note: Section 1(1).)
- Statutory Instrument
- Parliament of the United Kingdom
- Citation: SI 1998/3162
- Territorial extent: Northern Ireland

Dates
- Made: 16 December 1998
- Commencement: various (Note: Section 1(2).)

Other legislation
- Amends: Arbitration Act 1996; Petroleum Act 1998
- Repeals/revokes: Fair Employment (Northern Ireland) Act 1974; Fair Employment (Northern Ireland) Act 1989; Fair Employment (Amendment) (Northern Ireland) Order 1991; Fair Employment (Amendment) (Northern Ireland) Order 1995
- Made under: Northern Ireland Act 1974
- Amended by: Fair Employment (School Teachers) Act (Northern Ireland) 2022

Status: Amended

Text of statute as originally enacted

Revised text of statute as amended

Text of the Fair Employment and Treatment (Northern Ireland) Order 1998 as in force today (including any amendments) within the United Kingdom, from legislation.gov.uk.

The Fair Employment and Treatment (Northern Ireland) Order 1998 (SI 1998/3162 (N.I. 12)) is an order in council for Northern Ireland consolidating and strengthening legislation regarding "fair employment".

== Provisions ==
The order established the

- statutory monitoring of the part-time workforce
- outlawing of discrimination on the grounds of religious belief or political opinion in the provision of goods, facilities and services

== Amendments ==
Fair Employment (School Teachers) Act (Northern Ireland) 2022 (Note: Section 4.)
- Act of the Northern Ireland Assembly
- Northern Ireland Assembly
- Long title: An Act to remove the exception for school teachers from the Fair Employment and Treatment (Northern Ireland) Order 1998; and for connected purposes.
- Citation: 2022 c. 23 (N.I.)
- Territorial extent: Northern Ireland

Dates
- Royal assent: 12 May 2022
- Commencement: 12 May 2024 (Note: Section 2.)

Other legislation
- Amends: Fair Employment and Treatment (Northern Ireland) Order 1998; Fair Employment and Treatment Order (Amendment) Regulations (Northern Ireland) 2003

Status: Current legislation

Text of statute as originally enacted

Revised text of statute as amended

Text of the Fair Employment (School Teachers) Act (Northern Ireland) 2022 as in force today (including any amendments) within the United Kingdom, from legislation.gov.uk.

The Fair Employment (School Teachers) Act (Northern Ireland) 2022 (c. 23 (N.I.)) amended the order to remove the exemption that teachers had from the legislation The exemption of teachers from the original legislation was described as an anachronism which justified discrimination.

The Catholic Bishop of Derry, Donal McKeown, has supported the legislation, and said the exemption was "no longer appropriate or required" and also described the assumption that everyone was either a Catholic or a Protestant as bizarre, while also noting concerns the move could be used as a "Trojan horse" to remove a Catholic ethos in schools. Arlene Foster had supported removing the exemption in 2021.
