= Justice (Northern Ireland) Act 2004 =

Act of the Parliament of the United Kingdom

Justice (Northern Ireland) Act 2004 (Note: Section 23.)
- Act of Parliament
- Parliament of the United Kingdom
- Long title: An Act to amend Part 1 of the Justice (Northern Ireland) Act 2002; to make further provision concerning the public prosecution service established by that Act; to impose a new duty on certain criminal justice organisations in Northern Ireland in relation to human rights standards; to make provision consequential on the dissolution of the Juvenile Justice Board; to amend the law relating to bail in Northern Ireland; to provide for the transfer of certain prisoners from Northern Ireland to another part of the United Kingdom; to amend section 103 of the Terrorism Act 2000; to provide for driving while disqualified to be an arrestable offence in Northern Ireland; to re-enact with amendments sections 79 to 81 of the Justice (Northern Ireland) Act 2002 and make further provision about court security officers in Northern Ireland; to enable barristers in Northern Ireland to enter into contracts for the provision of their services; and for connected purposes.
- Citation: 2004 c. 4
- Territorial extent: Northern Ireland (Note: Section 22. Except that any amendment made by this Act has the same extent as the provision to which it relates.)

Dates
- Royal assent: 13 May 2004
- Commencement: Various (Note: Section 19.)
Other legislation
Amends	Judicature (Northern Ireland) Act 1978; Magistrates' Courts (Northern Ireland) Order 1981; Police and Criminal Evidence (Northern Ireland) Order 1989; Crime (Sentences) Act 1997; Police (Northern Ireland) Act 1998; Criminal Justice (Children) (Northern Ireland) Order 1998; Terrorism Act 2000; Police (Northern Ireland) Act 2000; Justice (Northern Ireland) Act 2002; Commissioner for Children and Young People (Northern Ireland) Order 2003; Criminal Justice (Northern Ireland) Order 2003; See § Repealed enactments
Repeals/revokes	Malone and Whiteabbey Training Schools Act (Northern Ireland) 1956; See § Repealed enactments
Amended by	Terrorism (Northern Ireland) Act 2006; Police and Justice Act 2006; Police and Criminal Evidence (Amendment) (Northern Ireland) Order 2007; Road Traffic (Northern Ireland) Order 2007; Northern Ireland Act 2009; Coroners and Justice Act 2009; Northern Ireland Court Service (Abolition and Transfer of Functions) Order (Northern Ireland) 2010; Northern Ireland Act 1998 (Devolution of Policing and Justice Functions) Order 2010; Justice Act (Northern Ireland) 2015; Justice (Northern Ireland) Act 2004 (Amendment of section 8(4)) Order (Northern Ireland) 2015

Status: Amended

Text of statute as originally enacted

Revised text of statute as amended

The Justice (Northern Ireland) Act 2004 (c. 4) is an act of the Parliament of the United Kingdom.

== Provisions ==
The act established the Northern Ireland Judicial Appointments Commission, with commissioners appointed by the Lord Chancellor.

The act allows for the Northern Ireland Public Prosecution Service to appeal decisions relating to bail applications. The act makes driving while disqualified an arrestable offence. The act made changes to the rules on the transfer of prisoners to England and Wales from Northern Ireland.

=== Repealed enactments ===
Section 18 of the act repealed 4 enactments and revoked 3 instruments, listed in schedule 4 to the act.

Citation	Short title	Extent of repeal
1953 c. 18 (N.I.)	Prison Act (Northern Ireland) 1953	In section 26, paragraph (d) and the word "or" immediately before it.
1956 c. 4 (N.I.)	Malone and Whiteabbey Training Schools Act (Northern Ireland) 1956	The whole act.
1998 c. 32	Police (Northern Ireland) Act 1998	In section 55(1), the words ", the Director" (wherever they occur).
1998 c. 32	Police (Northern Ireland) Act 1998	In section 55(7) the words ", the Director".
SI 1998/1504 (N.I. 9)	Criminal Justice (Children) (Northern Ireland) Order 1998	Article 56.
SI 1998/1504 (N.I. 9)	Criminal Justice (Children) (Northern Ireland) Order 1998	Article 57(2).
2002 c. 26	Justice (Northern Ireland) Act 2002	Section 34(4).
2002 c. 26	Justice (Northern Ireland) Act 2002	In section 46(1)(h) the words "(other than the Juvenile Justice Board)".
2002 c. 26	Justice (Northern Ireland) Act 2002	Sections 79 to 81.
2002 c. 26	Justice (Northern Ireland) Act 2002	Section 90(2) and (3).
2002 c. 26	Justice (Northern Ireland) Act 2002	In Schedule 12, paragraph 75.
SI 2003/439 (N.I. 11)	Commissioner for Children and Young People (Northern Ireland) Order 2003	In Schedule 1, in paragraph 13 the words "the Juvenile Justice Board and" and the word "other".
SI 2003/1247 (N.I. 13)	Criminal Justice (Northern Ireland) Order 2003	In Schedule 1, paragraph 3.

=== Section 19 - Commencement ===
The following orders have been made under this section:

- The Justice (Northern Ireland) Act 2004 (Commencement) Order 2004 (S.R. 2004/267 (C. 10))
- The Justice (Northern Ireland) Act 2004 (Commencement No. 2) Order 2004 (S.R. 2004/432 (C. 23))
- The Justice (Northern Ireland) Act 2004 (Commencement No. 3) Order 2005 (S.R. 2005/282 (C. 22))
- The Justice (Northern Ireland) Act 2004 (Commencement No. 4) Order 2010 (S.R. 2010/114 (C. 8))
