= Traffic Signs Regulations and General Directions =

UK legislation

Traffic Signs Regulations and General Directions 2016
- Statutory Instrument
- Parliament of the United Kingdom
- Citation: SI 2016/362
- Territorial extent: Great Britain

Dates
- Made: 16 March 2016
- Laid before Parliament: 22 March 2016
- Commencement: 22 April 2016

Other legislation
- Repeals/revokes: Zebra, Pelican and Puffin Pedestrian Crossings Regulations and General Directions 1997; Traffic Signs (Temporary Obstructions) Regulations 1997; Traffic Signs Regulations and General Directions 2002; School Crossing Patrol Sign (England and Wales) Regulations 2006
- Made under: Road Traffic Regulation Act 1984; Road Traffic Act 1988

Status: Current legislation

Text of the Traffic Signs Regulations and General Directions 2016 as in force today (including any amendments) within the United Kingdom, from legislation.gov.uk.

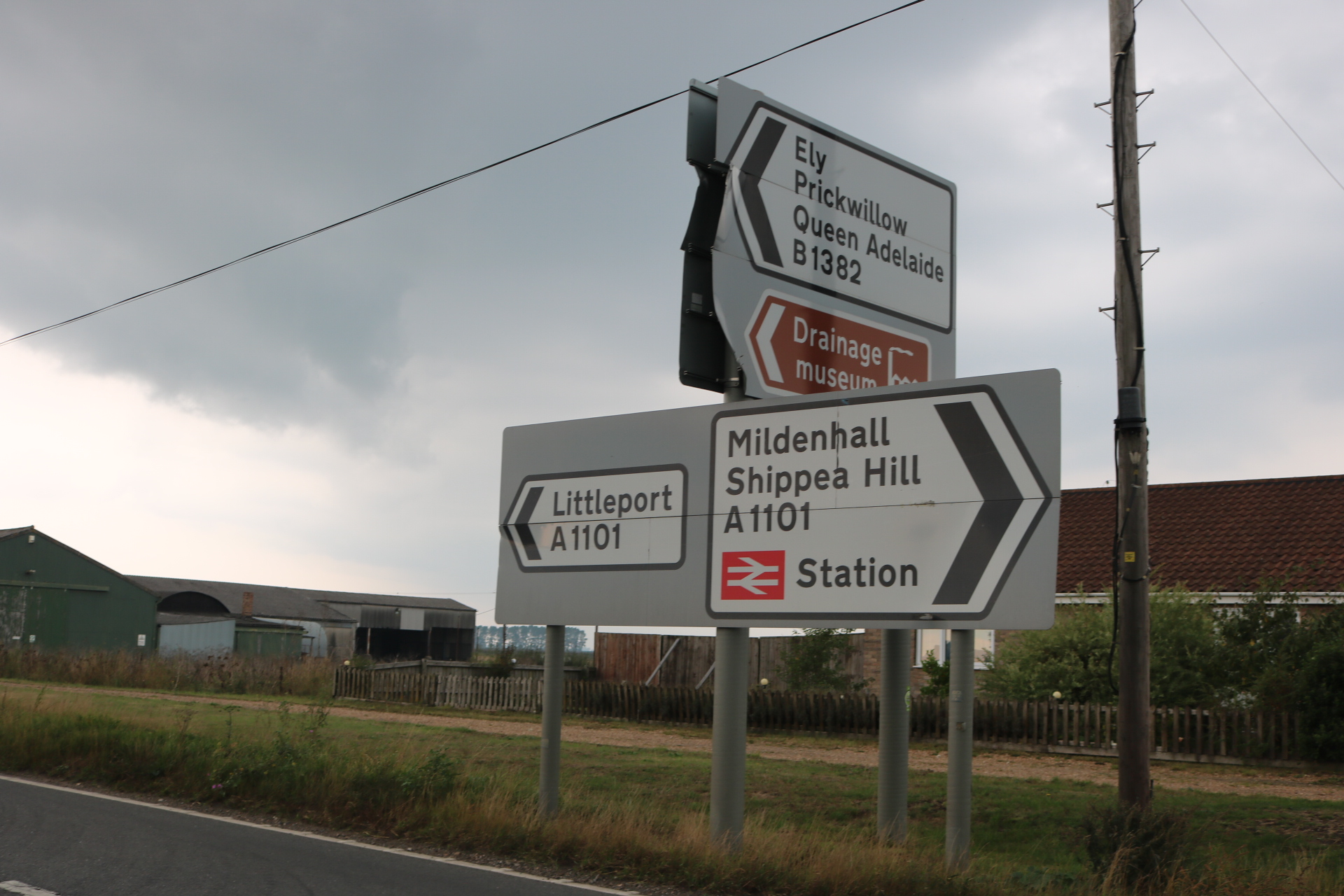
Road signs in Cambridgeshire designed in accordance with the TSRGD

The Traffic Signs Regulations and General Directions (commonly abbreviated to TSRGD) is the law that sets out the design and conditions of use of official traffic signs that can be lawfully placed on or near roads in Great Britain (England, Scotland and Wales) and the Isle of Man. The regulations came into effect in 1965, and were the result of the review of British road signage carried out by the Worboys Committee.

== Versions ==
The TSRGD came into force on 1 March 1957. A new edition was issued in 1964 to implement the re-signing recommendations of the Worboys Committee of 1963, with signage designs and typeface developed by Jock Kinneir and Margaret Calvert taking effect from 1 January 1965. Since 1964, the TSRGD has been revised and re-issued several times to introduce new signage rules and features reflecting changes in road operations.

Regulations introduced in 1994 included provisions for optional metric supplementary indications on height-restriction signs. This was followed in 2002 by provisions for optional metric supplementary indications on width-restriction signs.

Minor updates are made between full revisions to introduce new signs and markings. For example, the Traffic Signs (Amendment) Regulations and General Directions 2008 (SI 2008/2177) introduced just one new sign, the combined "speed-limit repeater" roundel and "traffic-camera" symbol on a rectangular plate. The Traffic Signs (Amendment) Regulations and General Directions 2011 (SI 2011/1040) introduced portable, temporary pedestrian crossings. The Traffic Signs (Amendment) (No. 2) Regulations and General Directions 2011 (SI 2011/3041), amongst many minor changes, provided for an optional dual-units (metric and imperial) height restriction warning triangle, changes to cycleway signage to allow estimated journey times to be flagged and the discontinuation of the use of the symbol "T" to mean tonnes on weight limit signs.

The current edition of the regulations is the Traffic Signs Regulations and General Directions 2016 (SI 2016/362), which came into force on 22 April 2016, with minor amendments in England and Wales in 2017.

Earlier versions were:

Traffic Signs Regulations and General Directions 1957
- Statutory Instrument
- Parliament of the United Kingdom
- Citation: SI 1957/13

Dates
- Made: 7 January 1957
- Laid before Parliament: 8 February 1957
- Commencement: 1 March 1957

Other legislation
- Repeals/revokes: Traffic Signs (Size, Colour and Type) Regulations 1950; Traffic Signs (General) Directions 1950
- Made under: Road Traffic Act 1930
- Revoked by: Traffic Signs Regulations and General Directions 1964

Status: Revoked

Traffic Signs Regulations and General Directions 1964
- Statutory Instrument
- Parliament of the United Kingdom
- Citation: SI 1964/1857

Dates
- Made: 20 November 1964
- Laid before Parliament: 9 December 1964
- Commencement: 1 January 1965

Other legislation
- Repeals/revokes: Traffic Signs Regulations and General Directions 1957
- Made under: Road Traffic Act 1960
- Revoked by: Traffic Signs Regulations and General Directions 1975

Status: Revoked

Text of statute as originally enacted

Traffic Signs Regulations and General Directions 1975
- Statutory Instrument
- Parliament of the United Kingdom
- Citation: SI 1975/1536

Dates
- Made: 18 September 1975
- Laid before Parliament: 13 October 1975
- Commencement: 3 November 1975

Other legislation
- Repeals/revokes: Traffic Signs Regulations and General Directions 1964
- Made under: Road Traffic Regulation Act 1967; Road Traffic Act 1972
- Revoked by: Traffic Signs Regulations and General Directions 1981

Status: Revoked

Text of statute as originally enacted

Traffic Signs Regulations and General Directions 1981
- Statutory Instrument
- Parliament of the United Kingdom
- Citation: SI 1981/859

Dates
- Made: 10 June 1981
- Laid before Parliament: 23 July 1981
- Commencement: 13 August 1981

Other legislation
- Repeals/revokes: Traffic Signs Regulations and General Directions 1975
- Made under: Road Traffic Regulation Act 1967; Road Traffic Act 1972
- Revoked by: Traffic Signs Regulations and General Directions 1994

Status: Revoked

Text of statute as originally enacted

Traffic Signs Regulations and General Directions 1994
- Statutory Instrument
- Parliament of the United Kingdom
- Citation: SI 1994/1519

Dates
- Made: 16 December 2002
- Laid before Parliament: 10 January 2003
- Commencement: 31 January 2003

Other legislation
- Repeals/revokes: Traffic Signs Regulations and General Directions 1981
- Made under: Road Traffic Regulation Act 1984; Road Traffic Act 1988
- Revoked by: Traffic Signs Regulations and General Directions 2002

Status: Revoked

Text of statute as originally enacted

Traffic Signs Regulations and General Directions 2002
- Statutory Instrument
- Parliament of the United Kingdom
- Citation: SI 2002/3113

Other legislation
- Repeals/revokes: Traffic Signs Regulations and General Directions 1994
- Revoked by: Traffic Signs Regulations and General Directions 2016

Status: Revoked

Text of statute as originally enacted

- Traffic Signs Regulations and General Directions 1957 (SI 1957/13)
- Traffic Signs Regulations and General Directions 1964 (SI 1964/1857)
- Traffic Signs Regulations and General Directions 1975 (SI 1975/1536)
- Traffic Signs Regulations and General Directions 1981 (SI 1981/859)
- Traffic Signs Regulations and General Directions 1994 (SI 1994/1519)
- Traffic Signs Regulations and General Directions 2002 (SI 2002/3113)
- Traffic Signs Regulations and General Directions 2016 (SI 2016/362)

== Traffic Signs Manual ==
The Traffic Signs Manual is a companion guide to the TSRGD which provides guidance to highway engineers about how and where to use traffic signs, including the size of sign to use (which depends on the speed of vehicles passing the sign). It was first issued in 1965 in a loose-leaf binder and was continuously updated. Individual chapters were also published in book form and these became the only format from 1980 onwards.

=== Chapters ===
The manual is split into eight chapters, though chapter 2 is, as of 2025, still in progress. Chapter 8 (road works and temporary situations) is further divided into three parts with part 1 being the design, part 2 being the operations and part 3 providing changes used to prescribe traffic signs since the TSRGD was overhauled in 2016.

- Chapter 1: Introduction (2018)
- Chapter 2: Informatory signs (in progress)
- Chapter 3: Regulatory signs (2019)
- Chapter 4: Warning signs (2018)
- Chapter 5: Road markings (2018)
- Chapter 6: Traffic control (2019)
- Chapter 7: Design of traffic signs (2018)
- Chapter 8: Road works and temporary situations
  - Part 1: Design (2009)
  - Part 2: Operations (2009)
  - Part 3: Update (2020)

== See also ==
- Highways Act 1980
- The Highway Code
- Road Traffic Regulation Act 1984
- Vienna Convention on Road Signs and Signals
- Manual on Uniform Traffic Control Devices, a comparable system in the United States
- Health and Safety (Safety Signs and Signals) Regulations 1996, similar regulations for safety signs
