= Road Traffic Regulation Act 1984 =

Act of the Parliament of the United Kingdom

Road Traffic Regulation Act 1984 (Note: Section 147(1).)
- Act of Parliament
- Parliament of the United Kingdom
- Long title: An Act to consolidate the Road Traffic Regulation Act 1967 and certain related enactments, with amendments to give effect to recommendations of the Law Commission and the Scottish Law Commission.
- Citation: 1984 c. 27
- Territorial extent: England and Wales; Scotland; (Note: Section 147(2).)

Dates
- Royal assent: 26 June 1984
- Commencement: 26 September 1984 (Note: Section 145(1). Section 145(2) provides that section 90 and paragraph 3 of schedule 8 shall come into force on such day or days as the Secretary of State may by order appoint; those provisions were brought into force by the Road Traffic Regulation Act 1984 (Commencement No. 1) Order 1986 (SI 1986/1147).)

Other legislation
- Amends: Metropolitan Police Act 1839; Road Traffic Act 1960; London Cab Act 1968; Pensions (Increase) Act 1971; Public Passenger Vehicles Act 1981; See § Repealed enactments
- Amended by: Local Government Act 1985; Transport Act 1985; Law Reform (Miscellaneous Provisions) (Scotland) Act 1985; Road Traffic Regulation (Parking) Act 1986; Airports Act 1986; Road Traffic (Consequential Provisions) Act 1988; Parking Act 1989; Statute Law (Repeals) Act 1989; New Roads and Street Works Act 1991; Road Traffic (Temporary Restrictions) Act 1991; Road Traffic Act 1991; Statute Law (Repeals) Act 1993; Road Traffic Regulation (Special Events) Act 1994; Local Government (Wales) Act 1994; Coal Industry Act 1994; Goods Vehicles (Licensing of Operators) Act 1995; Environment Act 1995; Deregulation (Parking Equipment) Order 1996; Statute Law (Repeals) Act 1998; Greater London Authority Act 1999; Transport Act 2000; Countryside and Rights of Way Act 2000; Statute Law (Repeals) Act 2004; Traffic Management Act 2004; Local Transport Act 2008; Scotland Act 2012; Infrastructure Act 2015; Scotland Act 2016; Policing and Crime Act 2017; Bus Services Act 2017; Wales Act 2017; Counter-Terrorism and Border Security Act 2019

Status: Amended

Text of statute as originally enacted

Revised text of statute as amended

Text of the Road Traffic Regulation Act 1984 as in force today (including any amendments) within the United Kingdom, from legislation.gov.uk.

The Road Traffic Regulation Act 1984 (c. 27) is an act of the Parliament of the United Kingdom, which provided powers to regulate or restrict traffic on roads in Great Britain, in the interest of safety. It superseded some earlier legislation, including the majority of the Road Traffic Regulation Act 1967. The act is split into 10 parts covering 147 sections, it also includes 14 schedules.

The act does not apply in Northern Ireland, where the Road Traffic Regulation (Northern Ireland) Order 1997 (SI 1997/276) makes similar provision.

== Part 1: General provisions for traffic regulation ==
A Traffic Management Order made under the RTRA 1984.

Part 1 includes sections 1 to 13 of the act. The legislation contained in these sections covers:

- Traffic Regulation Orders (TRO), known as Traffic Management Orders (TMO) in Greater London. These are used to make temporary, experimental or permanent restrictions on the use of a section of highway. TROs may be applied to unadopted roads (private roads) that the public use as well as adopted roads (public roads).
- Regulations outside Greater London
- Regulations in Greater London
- Experimental traffic schemes - these can be introduced for up to 18 months, to allow an authority to assess the impacts of a scheme such as traffic diversions.

== Part 3: Crossings and playgrounds ==
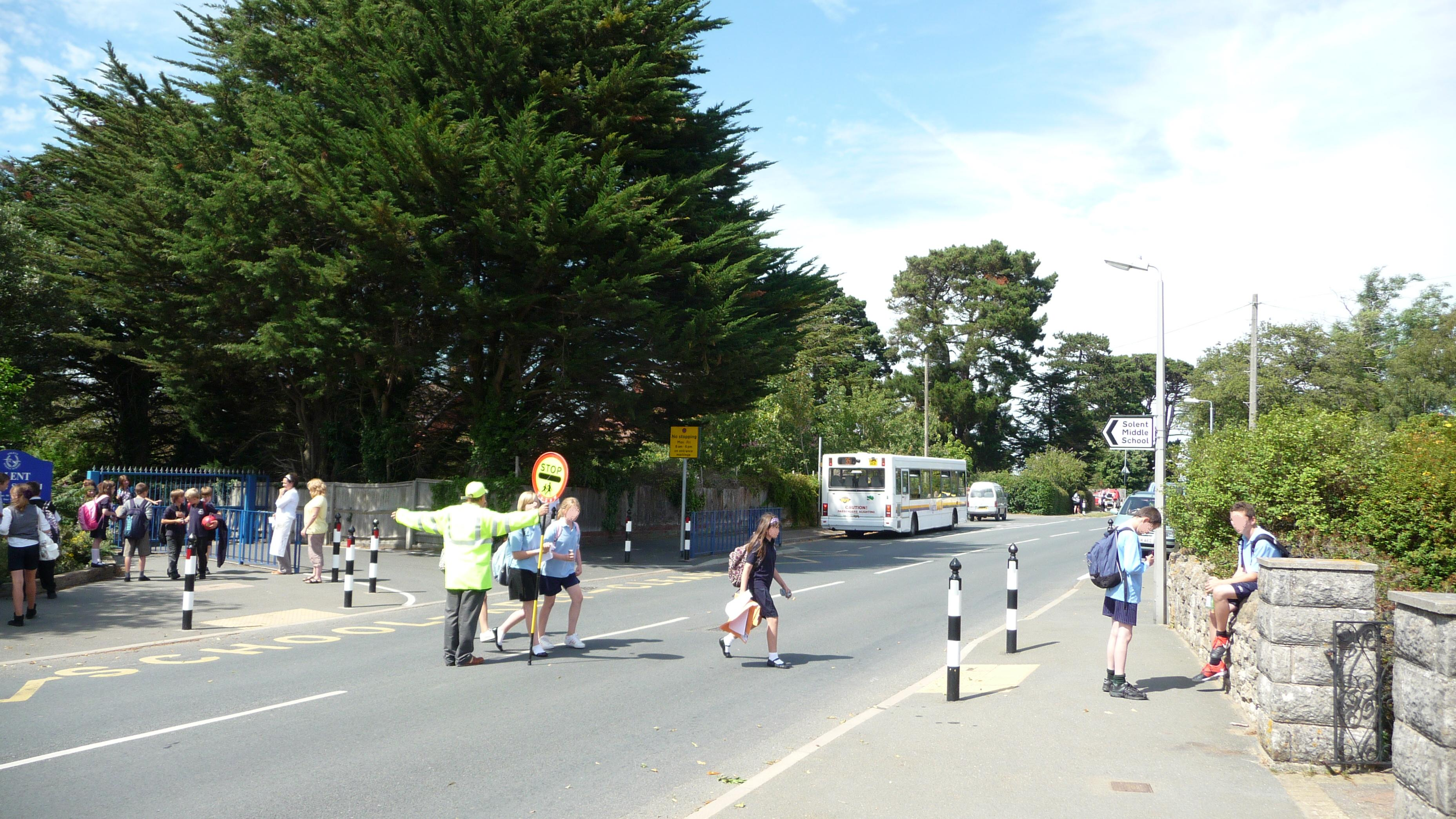
A school crossing patrol on the Isle of Wight.

Authorities can designate highways as 'Play Streets' under the act.

Part 3 includes sections 23 to 31 of the act. The legislation contained in these sections covers:

- Pedestrian crossings
- School crossings
- Street playgrounds

== Part 4: Parking places ==
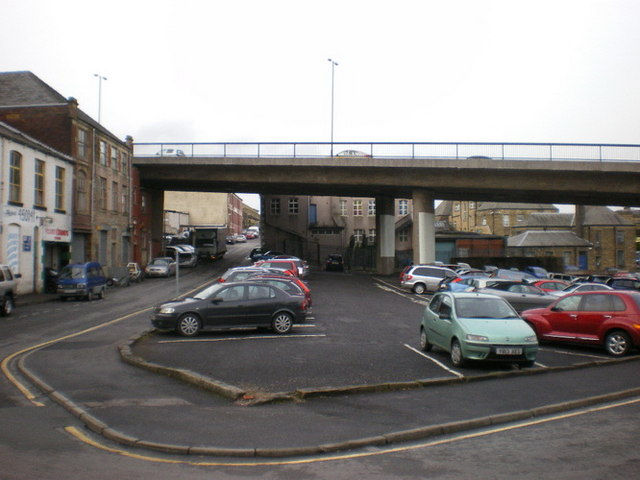
In Burnley, an example of off-street parking controlled by a local authority.

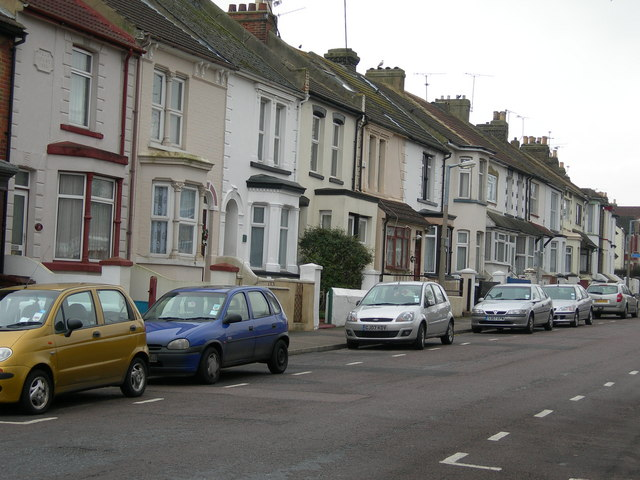
On-street parking controls in Gillingham

Part 4 includes sections 32 to 63 of the act. The legislation contained in these sections covers:

- Provision of off-street parking and parking on roads without payment
- Control of off-street parking
- Parking on highways for payment
- Provision of parking places by parish or community councils
- Special parking provisions

== Part 5: Traffic signs ==
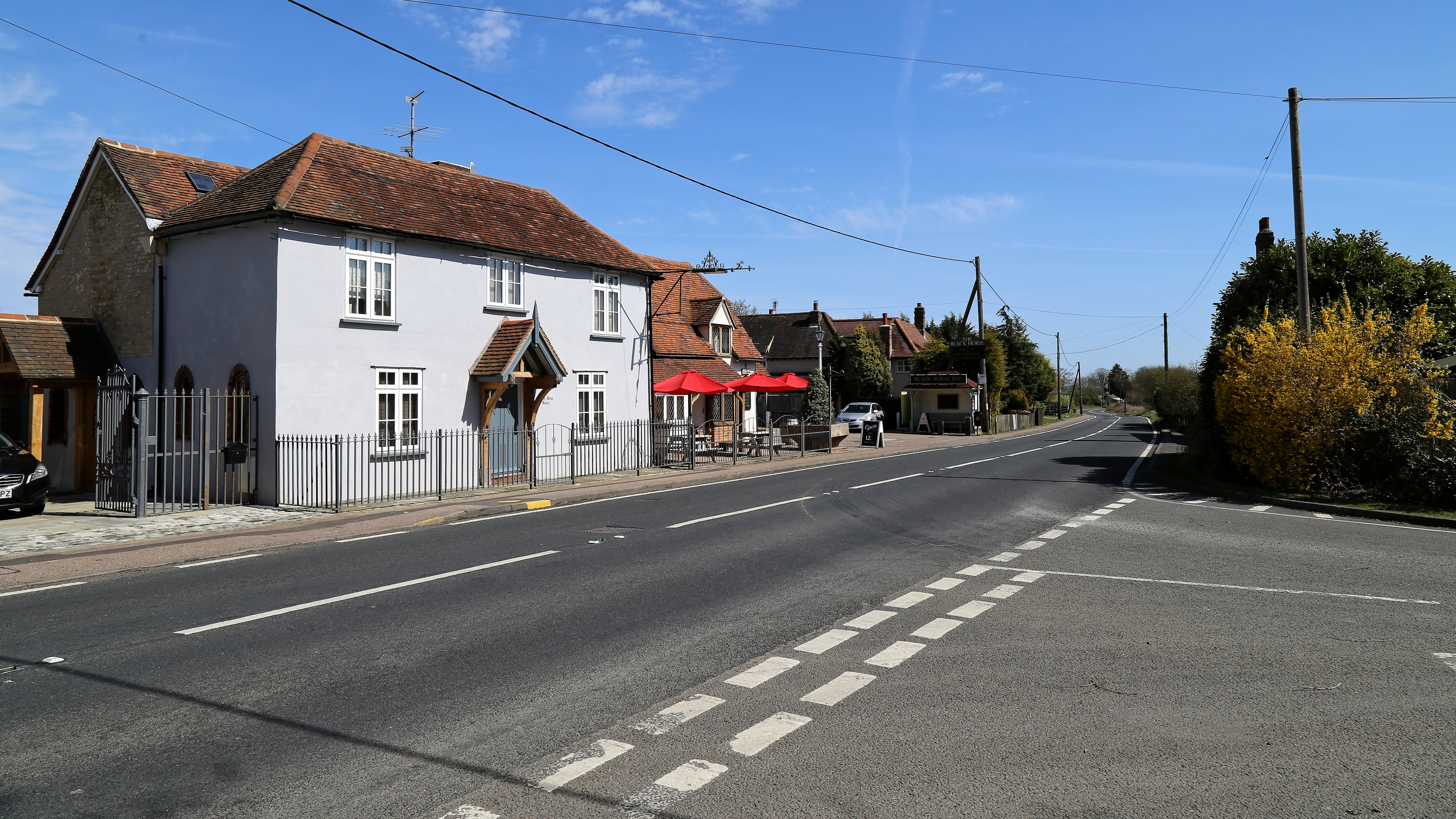
Road markings are covered by the Traffic Signs provisions in the act.

Within the act, "traffic signs" has a broad meaning including fixed signs, portable signs and road markings. Part 5 includes sections 64 to 80 of the act. The legislation contained in these sections covers:

- General provisions
- Provisions as to Greater London
- Supplementary provision

== Part 6: Speed limits ==
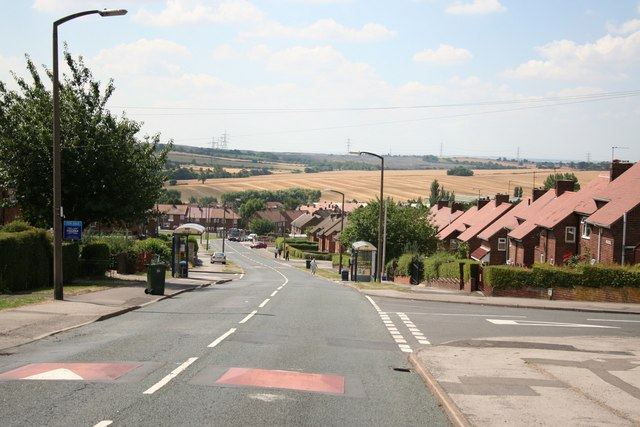
Under RTRA, the default speed limit is 30mph where street lights are 200 yards apart or closer.

Part 6 includes sections 81 to 91 of the act. The legislation contained in these sections covers:

- Various powers relating to speed limits including:

Speed limits on restricted and non-restricted roads
Traffic signs indicating speed restrictions
Speeding offences
Approval of radar speed measuring devices
Speed limitations to certain types of vehicle (section 86)
Speed limit Exemptions for vehicles used for police, fire, ambulance, or National Crime Agency purposes (section 87)

== Part 7: Bollards and other obstructions ==
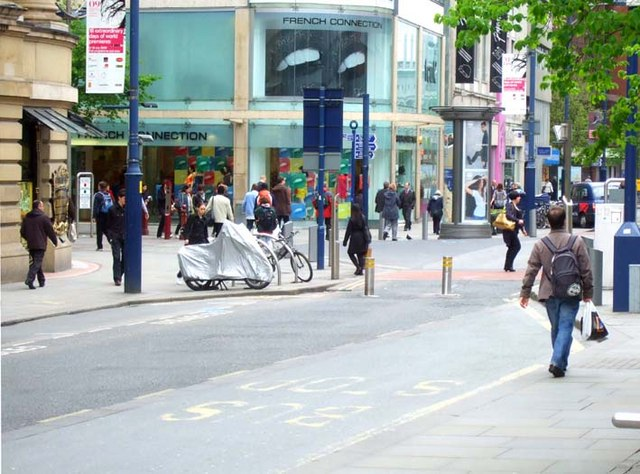
Rising bollards can be used to exclude motor traffic at certain times.

Part 7 includes sections 92 to 94 of the act. The legislation contained in these sections covers:

- Bollards and other obstructions

== Part 8: Control and enforcement ==
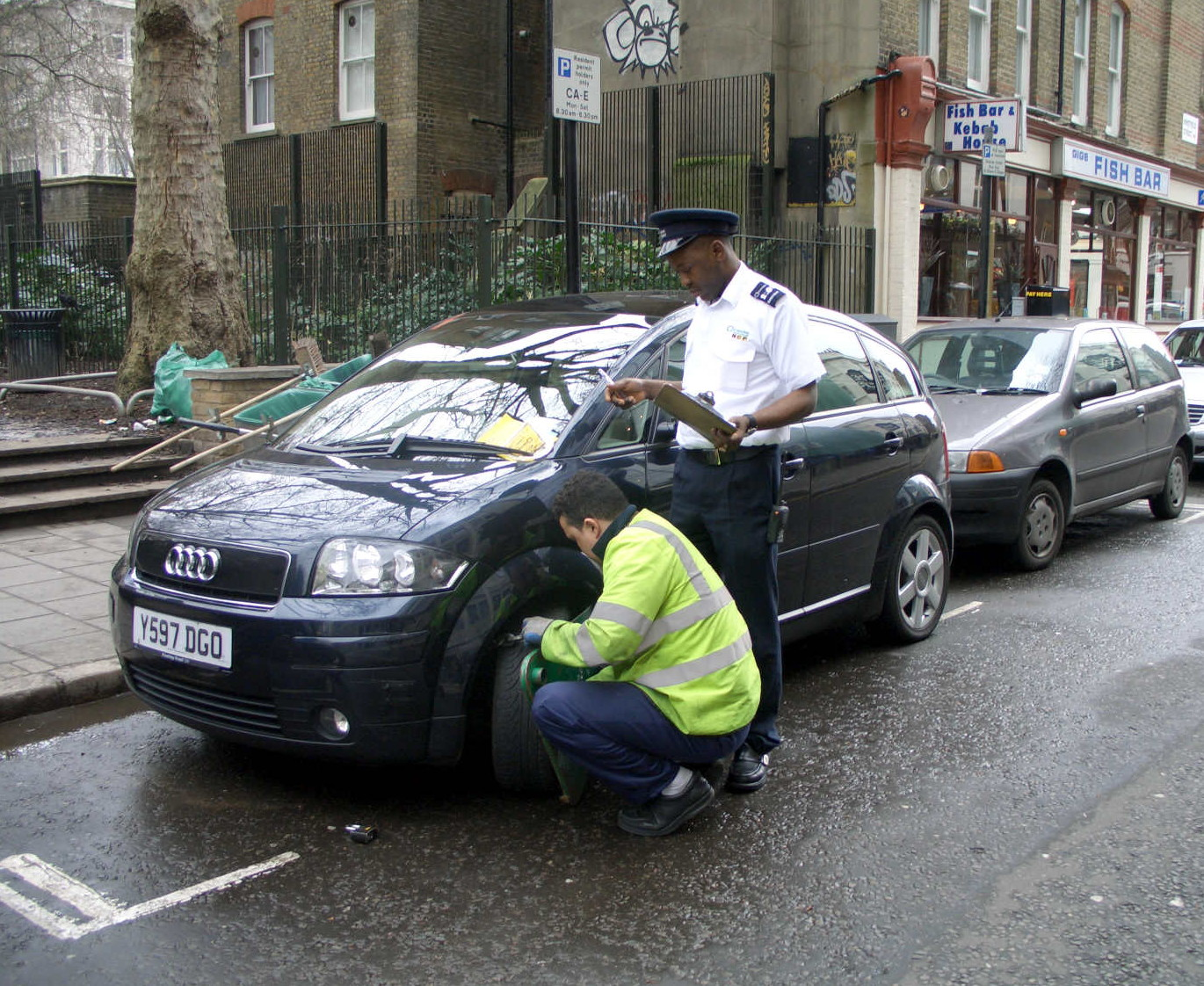
A traffic warden enforcing parking restrictions in Camden, London.

Part 8 includes sections 95 to 111 of the act. The legislation contained in these sections covers:

- Traffic wardens
- Penalties other than fixed penalties
- Removal or immobilisation of vehicles
- Enforcement of excess parking charges

== Part 9: Further provisions as to enforcement ==
Part 9 includes sections 112 to 121 of the act. The legislation contained in these sections covers:

- General provisions
- Special provisions relating to Scotland

== Part 10: General and supplementary provisions ==
Part 10 includes sections 122 to 147 of the act. The legislation contained in these sections covers:

- Various supplementary powers including:

Exercise of functions by local authorities
Boundary roads
Footpaths, bridleways and byways open to all traffic
Power to hold inquiries
Application of the act to Crown roads
Application of the act to the Isles of Scilly
Vehicles used for marine salvage
Hovercraft
Tramcars and trolley vehicles

=== Repealed enactments ===
Section 146(b) of the act repealed 38 enactments, listed in schedule 14 to the act.

Citation	Short title	Extent of repeal
1967 c. 76	Road Traffic Regulation Act 1967	The whole act except sections 109 and 113 and Schedule 6.
1967 c. 77	Police (Scotland) Act 1967	In Schedule 4, the entry relating to the Road Traffic Regulation Act 1967.
1968 c. 41	Countryside Act 1968	In section 27, in subsection (6), the words from "and in section 63" onwards. Section 32.
1968 c. 59	Hovercraft Act 1968	In the Schedule, in paragraph 4, sub-paragraph (d).
1968 c. 73	Transport Act 1968	Sections 126 to 132. Section 149. Schedule 14.
1968 c. xxxvii	City of London (Various Powers) Act 1968	Section 8.
1969 c. 27	Vehicle and Driving Licences Act 1969	In section 16, subsection (6).
1969 c. 35	Transport (London) Act 1969	Sections 32 to 36. Schedule 5.
1970 c. 20	Roads (Scotland) Act 1970	In Schedule 1, paragraph 12.
1970 c. 29	Parish Councils and Burial Authorities (Miscellaneous Provisions) Act 1970	Section 3.
1971 c. 62	Tribunals and Inquiries Act 1971	In Schedule 3, the entry relating to the Transport (London) Act 1969.
1971 c. 78	Town and Country Planning Act 1971	In Part II of Schedule 23, the entry relating to Schedule 5 to the Transport (London) Act 1969.
1972 c. 11	Superannuation Act 1972	In Schedule 6, paragraph 69.
1972 c. 20	Road Traffic Act 1972	In section 203, subsection (2). In Schedule 4, in Part III, paragraphs 4 to 8. In Schedule 7, the entry relating to the Road Traffic Regulation Act 1967.
1972 c. 70	Local Government Act 1972	In Schedule 19, Part II.
1973 c. 44	Heavy Commercial Vehicles (Controls and Regulations) Act 1973	Section 1.
1973 c. 65	Local Government (Scotland) Act 1973	In Schedule 14, paragraphs 59 to 73. In Schedule 25, paragraphs 34 to 38.
1974 c. 7	Local Government Act 1974	In Schedule 6, paragraph 20.
1974 c. 50	Road Traffic Act 1974	Sections 1 to 5. Section 19. In section 21, subsection (1). Section 22(a). Schedule 1. In Schedule 5—(a) Part II; and (b) in Part IV, paragraph 3. In Schedule 6, paragraphs 4 to 9.
1974 c. xxiv	Greater London Council (General Powers) Act 1974	Sections 12 and 13.
1975 c. 21	Criminal Procedure (Scotland) Act 1975	In Schedules 7C and 7D, the entries relating to the Road Traffic Regulation Act 1967.
1976 c. 3	Road Traffic (Drivers' Ages and Hours of Work) Act 1976	In Schedule 1, paragraph 16.
1976 c. 57	Local Government (Miscellaneous Provisions) Act 1976	Section 37.
1976 c. xxvi	Greater London Council (General Powers) Act 1976	Section 4. Schedule.
1977 c. 45	Criminal Law Act 1977	In Schedules 6 and 12, the entry relating to the Road Traffic Regulation Act 1967.
1978 c. 55	Transport Act 1978	Sections 11 and 12.
1980 c. 34	Transport Act 1980	In Schedule 5, in Part II, the entry relating to the Road Traffic Regulation Act 1967.
1980 c. 62	Criminal Justice (Scotland) Act 1980	Section 31. In Schedule 1, the entry relating to the Road Traffic Regulation Act 1967.
1980 c. 65	Local Government, Planning and Land Act 1980	In Schedule 7, in Part II, paragraphs 9 to 13.
1980 c. 66	Highways Act 1980	In section 340, in subsection (2), paragraph (a). In Schedule 24, paragraph 16.
1981 c. 14	Public Passenger Vehicles Act 1981	In Schedule 7, paragraphs 4 to 8.
1981 c. 43	Disabled Persons Act 1981	Section 2.
1981 c. 56	Transport Act 1981	In section 24, in subsection (1), the words "and in section 103(1) of the Road Traffic Regulation Act 1967".
1981 c. 67	Acquisition of Land Act 1981	In paragraph 1 of Schedule 4, the entry relating to the Road Traffic Regulation Act 1967.
1981 c. 69	Wildlife and Countryside Act 1981	Section 60.
1981 c. xvii	Greater London Council (General Powers) Act 1981	Section 7.
1982 c. 48	Criminal Justice Act 1982	In Schedule 3, the entries relating to the Road Traffic Regulation Act 1967.
1982 c. 49	Transport Act 1982	Sections 53 to 55. Section 56(1), (3) and (4). Sections 61 and 62. In section 64(2)—(a) paragraph (a); and (b) the words "in the former case as subsections (4) and (5) and in the latter case". Section 69. Section 72(b). In section 73—(a) in subsection (1), the words "subject to subsection (2) below, "; (b) subsection (2); (c) subsection (3)(b); and (d) in subsection (4), the words "or an order to which section 55(6) of this Act applies". In section 76—(a) in subsection (2), the words "Subject to subsection (3) below "; and (b) subsection (3). In Schedule 2, the entry relating to the Road Traffic Regulation Act 1967. In Schedule 5, paragraphs 1 to 4, 18 and 19.

== Schedules ==
The act contains 14 schedules.

== See also ==
- Highways Act 1980
- The Highway Code
- Traffic Signs Regulations and General Directions
