= Road Traffic (Consequential Provisions) Act 1988 =

Act of the Parliament of the United Kingdom

Road Traffic (Consequential Provisions) Act 1988 (Note: Section 8(1).)
- Act of Parliament
- Parliament of the United Kingdom
- Long title: An Act to make provision for repeals (including a repeal to give effect to a recommendation of the Law Commission and the Scottish Law Commission), consequential amendments, transitional and transitory matters and savings in connection with the consolidation of enactments in the Road Traffic Act 1988 and the Road Traffic Offenders Act 1988.
- Citation: 1988 c. 54
- Territorial extent: England and Wales; Scotland; (Note: Section 8(5).)

Dates
- Royal assent: 15 November 1988
- Commencement: 15 May 1989 (Note: Section 8(2).)
Other legislation
Amends	Energy Act 1976; Sexual Offences Act 1985; See § Repealed enactments and revoked instruments
Repeals/revokes	See § Repealed enactments and revoked instruments
Amended by	Finance Act 1994; Vehicle Excise and Registration Act 1994; Value Added Tax Act 1994; Deregulation and Contracting Out Act 1994; Goods Vehicles (Licensing of Operators) Act 1995; Road Traffic (New Drivers) Act 1995; Criminal Procedure (Consequential Provisions) (Scotland) Act 1995; Competition Act 1998; Road Traffic (Vehicle Testing) Act 1999; Powers of Criminal Courts (Sentencing) Act 2000; Serious Organised Crime and Police Act 2005; Policing and Crime Act 2009
Relates to	Road Traffic Act 1988; Road Traffic Offenders Act 1988

Status: Partially repealed

Text of statute as originally enacted

Revised text of statute as amended

Text of the Road Traffic (Consequential Provisions) Act 1988 as in force today (including any amendments) within the United Kingdom, from legislation.gov.uk.

The Road Traffic (Consequential Provisions) Act 1988 (c. 54) is an act of the Parliament of the United Kingdom that makes provision for repeals, consequential amendments, transitional matters, and savings in connection with the consolidation of enactments in the Road Traffic Act 1988 and the Road Traffic Offenders Act 1988.

== Provisions ==
=== Repealed enactments and revoked instruments ===
Sections 3(1) and 3(3) of the act repealed 45 enactments and revoked 13 instruments, listed in parts I and II of schedule 1 to the act, respectively.

Part I – Enactments Repealed
Citation	Short title	Extent of repeal
1968 c. 73	Transport Act 1968	In Schedule 11, the entry for section 244 of the Road Traffic Act 1960.
1972 c. 20	Road Traffic Act 1972	The whole act.
1972 c. 27	Road Traffic (Foreign Vehicles) Act 1972	Section 1(6)(a)(ii).
1972 c. 27	Road Traffic (Foreign Vehicles) Act 1972	In Schedule 2, the entry relating to sections 68 to 73 and 76 to 79 of the Road Traffic Act 1972 and regulations made under those sections.
1972 c. 70	Local Government Act 1972	In section 186(1), the words from the beginning to first "and".
1972 c. 70	Local Government Act 1972	Schedule 19.
1973 c. 44	Heavy Commercial Vehicles (Controls and Regulations) Act 1973	The whole act.
1973 c. 62	Powers of Criminal Courts Act 1973	In Schedule 5, paragraph 43.
1973 c. 65	Local Government (Scotland) Act 1973	In Schedule 14, paragraphs 82 to 86.
1974 c. 50	Road Traffic Act 1974	Sections 6 to 15.
1974 c. 50	Road Traffic Act 1974	Sections 20 to 22.
1974 c. 50	Road Traffic Act 1974	Schedule 2.
1974 c. 50	Road Traffic Act 1974	Schedule 3.
1974 c. 50	Road Traffic Act 1974	Schedule 5.
1974 c. 50	Road Traffic Act 1974	In Schedule 6, paragraphs 12 to 24.
1975 c. 21	Criminal Procedure (Scotland) Act 1975	In Schedule 7D, the entries relating to the Road Traffic Act 1972.
1975 c. 46	International Road Haulage Permits Act 1975	In section 3, subsections (2) to (5).
1976 c. 3	Road Traffic (Drivers' Ages and Hours of Work) Act 1976	Section 1.
1976 c. 3	Road Traffic (Drivers' Ages and Hours of Work) Act 1976	Section 4(2)(b).
1976 c. 3	Road Traffic (Drivers' Ages and Hours of Work) Act 1976	Schedules 1 and 2.
1976 c. 57	Local Government (Miscellaneous Provisions) Act 1976	In section 80(1), the definition of "the Act of 1972".
1976 c. 62	Motor-Cycle Crash Helmets (Religious Exemption) Act 1976	The whole act.
1977 c. 45	Criminal Law Act 1977	Section 50.
1977 c. 45	Criminal Law Act 1977	In Schedule 1, the entries relating to the Road Traffic Act 1972.
1977 c. 45	Criminal Law Act 1977	In Schedule 5, paragraph 2.
1977 c. 45	Criminal Law Act 1977	In Schedule 6, the entry relating to the Road Traffic Act 1972.
1977 c. 45	Criminal Law Act 1977	In Schedule 12, the amendments of the Road Traffic Act 1972.
1977 c. 49	National Health Service Act 1977	In Schedule 15, paragraph 56.
1978 c. 55	Transport Act 1978	In section 9, in subsection (1) the words from the beginning to third "and" and subsection (2).
1978 c. 55	Transport Act 1978	In section 24(2), the definition of "the 1972 Act".
1978 c. 55	Transport Act 1978	In Schedule 3, Part A.
1980 c. 34	Transport Act 1980	Section 37(4).
1980 c. 34	Transport Act 1980	Section 61.
1980 c. 34	Transport Act 1980	Section 63.
1980 c. 43	Magistrates' Courts Act 1980	In Schedule 7, paragraphs 111 and 112.
1980 c. 53	Health Services Act 1980	In Schedule 1, paragraph 21.
1980 c. 62	Criminal Justice (Scotland) Act 1980	Section 7(2).
1980 c. 62	Criminal Justice (Scotland) Act 1980	Section 26(8).
1980 c. 62	Criminal Justice (Scotland) Act 1980	Section 55.
1980 c. 62	Criminal Justice (Scotland) Act 1980	In Schedule 7, paragraph 23.
1980 c. 66	Highways Act 1980	In Schedule 24, paragraph 21.
1981 c. 14	Public Passenger Vehicles Act 1981	In Schedule 7, paragraphs 12 to 15.
1981 c. 31	Insurance Companies Act 1981	In Schedule 4, paragraph 22.
1981 c. 45	Forgery and Counterfeiting Act 1981	In section 12, the words "section 169(3) of the Road Traffic Act 1972".
1981 c. 56	Transport Act 1981	Part IV.
1981 c. 56	Transport Act 1981	Schedules 7 and 8.
1981 c. 56	Transport Act 1981	In Schedule 9, Part I.
1982 c. 48	Criminal Justice Act 1982	In section 39, subsection (1)(b)(i).
1982 c. 48	Criminal Justice Act 1982	In Schedule 2, the entry relating to the Road Traffic Act 1972.
1982 c. 48	Criminal Justice Act 1982	In Schedule 3, the entries relating to the Road Traffic Act 1972.
1982 c. 48	Criminal Justice Act 1982	In Schedule 6, the entries relating to the Road Traffic Act 1972.
1982 c. 48	Criminal Justice Act 1982	In Schedule 15, paragraph 16.
1982 c. 49	Transport Act 1982	Section 16.
1982 c. 49	Transport Act 1982	In section 17, subsection (3) and, in subsection (4), the words from "and in subsection (4)(a) of that section" to the end.
1982 c. 49	Transport Act 1982	In section 24, the last column of the entries made by subsection (3)(b).
1982 c. 49	Transport Act 1982	Part III.
1982 c. 49	Transport Act 1982	Sections 56 to 60.
1982 c. 49	Transport Act 1982	Sections 63 and 64.
1982 c. 49	Transport Act 1982	Section 73(3).
1982 c. 49	Transport Act 1982	Schedules 1, 2 and 3.
1982 c. 49	Transport Act 1982	In Schedule 5, paragraphs 7 to 16, 17(1), 25 and 26.
1982 c. 50	Insurance Companies Act 1982	In Schedule 5, paragraph 12.
1983 c. 43	Road Traffic (Driving Licences) Act 1983	Section 1.
1983 c. 43	Road Traffic (Driving Licences) Act 1983	In section 2, subsections (1) and (2).
1984 c. 13	Road Traffic (Driving Instruction) Act 1984	The whole act.
1984 c. 27	Road Traffic Regulation Act 1984	Section 35(8).
1984 c. 27	Road Traffic Regulation Act 1984	Section 47(7).
1984 c. 27	Road Traffic Regulation Act 1984	In section 52(2), the words "and subsection (7)".
1984 c. 27	Road Traffic Regulation Act 1984	Section 53(7).
1984 c. 27	Road Traffic Regulation Act 1984	Section 78.
1984 c. 27	Road Traffic Regulation Act 1984	Section 90.
1984 c. 27	Road Traffic Regulation Act 1984	Section 98.
1984 c. 27	Road Traffic Regulation Act 1984	Sections 113 and 114.
1984 c. 27	Road Traffic Regulation Act 1984	Section 118.
1984 c. 27	Road Traffic Regulation Act 1984	Sections 120 and 121.
1984 c. 27	Road Traffic Regulation Act 1984	Section 130(2)(c), (4) and (5).
1984 c. 27	Road Traffic Regulation Act 1984	In section 145(2), the words "Section 90 and".
1984 c. 27	Road Traffic Regulation Act 1984	Schedule 7.
1984 c. 27	Road Traffic Regulation Act 1984	In Schedule 10, paragraph 12.
1984 c. 27	Road Traffic Regulation Act 1984	In Schedule 13, paragraphs 13 to 28, 50, 51 and 54 to 56.
1984 c. 32	London Regional Transport Act 1984	In Schedule 6, paragraph 10.
1984 c. 38	Cycle Tracks Act 1984	Section 2.
1984 c. 54	Roads (Scotland) Act 1984	In Schedule 9, paragraphs 68, 88(2) and 93(39).
1984 c. 60	Police and Criminal Evidence Act 1984	In Schedule 2, the entry relating to the Road Traffic Act 1972.
1984 c. 60	Police and Criminal Evidence Act 1984	In Schedule 5, in Part II the entry relating to the Road Traffic Act 1972.
1985 c. 28	Motor-Cycle Crash-Helmets (Restriction of Liability) Act 1985	The whole act.
1985 c. 34	Road Traffic (Production of Documents) Act 1985	The whole act.
1985 c. 51	Local Government Act 1985	In Schedule 5, paragraphs 2 and 4(21).
1985 c. 51	Local Government Act 1985	In Schedule 14, paragraph 49.
1985 c. 66	Bankruptcy (Scotland) Act 1985	In Schedule 7, paragraph 10.
1985 c. 67	Transport Act 1985	In Schedule 2, in Part II paragraph 3.
1985 c. 73	Law Reform (Miscellaneous Provisions) (Scotland) Act 1985	Section 38.
1985 c. 73	Law Reform (Miscellaneous Provisions) (Scotland) Act 1985	In Schedule 2, paragraphs 26 and 27.
1985 c. 73	Law Reform (Miscellaneous Provisions) (Scotland) Act 1985	In Schedule 3, paragraph 2.
1986 c. 45	Insolvency Act 1986	In Schedule 14, the entry relating to the Road Traffic Act 1972.
1987 c. 41	Criminal Justice (Scotland) Act 1987	In Schedule 1, paragraph 3.
1988 c. 23	Motor Vehicles (Wearing of Rear Seat Belts by Children) Act 1988	Section 1.
1988 c. 23	Motor Vehicles (Wearing of Rear Seat Belts by Children) Act 1988	Section 3(2) and (3).
1988 c. 33	Criminal Justice Act 1988	Section 37(2).
1988 c. 33	Criminal Justice Act 1988	Section 63.
1988 c. 33	Criminal Justice Act 1988	Section 68.
1988 c. 33	Criminal Justice Act 1988	In Schedule 15, paragraphs 92 to 94.

Part II – Subordinate Legislation Revoked
Citation	Title	Extent of revocation
SI 1973/2143	Motor Vehicles (Compulsory Insurance) (No. 2) Regulations 1973	Regulations 3, 4 and 9.
SI 1977/1043	Motor Cars (Driving Instruction) Regulations 1977	Regulation 4.
SI 1981/160	Road Traffic (Northern Ireland Consequential Amendments) Order 1981	Article 2.
SI 1981/1692	Passenger and Goods Vehicles (Recording Equipment) Regulations 1981	All the Regulations.
SI 1982/1550	Motor Vehicles (Tests) (Extension) Order 1982	The whole Order.
SI 1982/1555	Driving Licences (Community Driving Licence) Regulations 1982	Regulations 2, 3 and 5.
SI 1986/368	Road Traffic Accidents (Payments for Treatment) (England and Wales) Order 1986	The whole Order.
SI 1986/408	Road Traffic Accidents (Payments for Treatment) (Scotland) Order 1986	The whole Order.
SI 1986/555	Fixed Penalty (Increase) (Scotland) (No. 2) Order 1986	The whole Order.
SI 1986/1078	Road Vehicles (Construction and Use) Regulations 1986	Regulation 91.
SI 1986/1327	Fixed Penalty (Increase) Order 1986	The whole Order.
SI 1987/353	Road Traffic Accidents (Payments for Treatment) Order 1987	The whole Order.
SI 1987/2171	Motor Vehicles (Compulsory Insurance) Regulations 1987	Regulations 2 to 4.
