= Transport Act 1968 =

Act of the Parliament of the United Kingdom

Transport Act 1968 (Note: Section 166(1).)
- Act of Parliament
- Parliament of the United Kingdom
- Long title: An Act to make further provision with respect to transport and related matters.
- Citation: 1968 c. 73
- Territorial extent: England and Wales; Scotland; Northern Ireland (in part) (Note: Section 164.)

Dates
- Royal assent: 25 October 1968
- Commencement: various (Note: Section 166(2).)

Other legislation
- Amends: Transport Act 1947; Road Traffic Act 1960
- Amended by: Income and Corporation Taxes Act 1970; Vehicles (Excise) Act 1971; Tribunals and Inquiries Act 1971; Road Traffic Act 1972; Northern Ireland Constitution Act 1973; Local Government (Scotland) Act 1973; Statute Law (Repeals) Act 1974; House of Commons Disqualification Act 1975; Northern Ireland Assembly Disqualification Act 1975; Statute Law (Repeals) Act 1976; Wages Councils Act 1979; Highways Act 1980; Public Passenger Vehicles Act 1981; Statute Law (Repeals) Act 1981; Road Traffic Regulation Act 1984; Road Traffic (Consequential Provisions) Act 1988; Statute Law (Repeals) Act 1989; Capital Allowances Act 1990; Food Safety Act 1990; Government Trading Act 1990; Trade Union Reform and Employment Rights Act 1993; Statute Law (Repeals) Act 1993; Goods Vehicles (Licensing of Operators) Act 1995; Statute Law (Repeals) Act 2004; Railways Act 2005; Statute Law (Repeals) Act 2008; Co-operative and Community Benefit Societies Act 2014; Deregulation Act 2015

Status: Amended

Text of statute as originally enacted

Revised text of statute as amended

Text of the Transport Act 1968 as in force today (including any amendments) within the United Kingdom, from legislation.gov.uk.

The Transport Act 1968 (c. 73) is an act of the Parliament of the United Kingdom. The main provisions made changes to the structure of nationally owned bus companies, created passenger transport authorities and executives to take over public transport in large conurbations.

== National Bus Company ==
The act formed, from 1 January 1969, the National Bus Company by merging the bus operating companies of the government-owned Transport Holding Company with those of the privately owned BET. NBC operated bus services throughout England and Wales outside of large cities, although independent operators still thrived in many rural areas.

== Scottish Transport Group ==
The Scottish Transport Group was also formed at the beginning of 1969. It combined the state-owned Scottish Bus Group and Caledonian Steam Packet Company shipping line.

== Passenger transport authorities and executives ==
The act also allowed the formation of passenger transport authorities to co-ordinate and operate public transport in large conurbations. The authorities were to be made up of councilors from the various local authorities in the area, while the executives were to be the operators of public transport: for the most part taking over the existing local authority bus fleets. Following consultation the following PTAs/PTEs were established under the Act:

- West Midlands on 1 October 1969
- SELNEC (South East Lancashire North East Cheshire) on 1 November 1969
- Merseyside on 1 December 1969
- Tyneside on 1 January 1970
- Greater Glasgow on 1 June 1973 (also operated the Glasgow Subway)

== Subsidies for socially necessary but unremunerative railways ==
Section 39 of the act introduced the first government subsidies for railways which were unremunerative for British Rail but deemed socially necessary. Grants could be paid where three conditions were met: (i) the line was unremunerative, (ii) it is desirable for social or economic reasons for the passenger services to continue, and (iii) it is financially unreasonable to expect British Rail to provide those services without a grant. (iv) A limit was also set on the amount of total grant payable was £50 million.

== Waterways ==
The act made changes to the use of facilities controlled by the state-owned British Waterways. Reflecting the decline in the use of canals and rivers for freight distribution, waterways were divided into three categories, as envisaged by the White Paper entitled British Waterways: Recreation and Amenity which was published in September 1967.

- Commercial waterways would be principally available for commercial use and the carriage of freight.
- Cruising waterways, would be available for leisure cruising, fishing and other recreational purposes.
- Remainder waterways, would be maintained to the minimum levels possible, consistent with requirements for public health, and the retention of amenity and safety.

An important provision for remainder waterways allowed them to be transferred to or maintained by local authorities. The Act recognized the value of the waterway network for leisure use, and set up the Inland Waterways Amenity Advisory Council (IWAAC) to give advice to both government and British Waterways on all matters concerned with the use of the network for recreation. In May 1968 the IWAAC had been set up as an informal body prior to the passing of the Act, and the 22 members became part of a statutory body on 18 November 1968, as a result of the Act.

== Vehicle testing and driving hours ==
The act made changes to the MOT vehicle test. Previously vehicles had been liable to annual testing ten years after first registration. This was reduced to three years from first registration. The Act also introduced maximum driving hours for goods drivers and also allowed the introduction of the tachograph to record driving periods despite the resistance of the trade unions, which called them 'the spy in the cab'.

== See also ==
- Canals of the United Kingdom
- History of the British canal system

== Bibliography ==
- Edwards, L A (1985). Inland Waterways of Great Britain (6th Ed). Imray Laurie Norie and Wilson. ISBN 978-0-85288-081-4.
