= Road Traffic Act 1972 =

Act of the Parliament of the United Kingdom

Road Traffic Act 1972 (Note: Section 209(1).)
- Act of Parliament
- Parliament of the United Kingdom
- Long title: An Act to consolidate certain enactments relating to road traffic with amendments to give effect to recommendations of the Law Commission and the Scottish Law Commission.
- Citation: 1972 c. 20
- Territorial extent: England and Wales; Scotland; (Note: Section 209(2).)

Dates
- Royal assent: 30 March 1972
- Commencement: 1 July 1972 (Note: Section 208.)
- Repealed: 15 May 1989

Other legislation
- Amends: See § Repealed enactments
- Repeals/revokes: See § Repealed enactments
- Amended by: Criminal Justice Act 1972; Transport Act 1980; Road Traffic Regulation Act 1984; Bankruptcy (Scotland) Act 1985; Coroners Act 1988
- Repealed by: Road Traffic (Consequential Provisions) Act 1988

Status: Repealed

Text of statute as originally enacted

The Road Traffic Act 1972 (c. 20) was an act of the Parliament of the United Kingdom that consolidated enactments relating to road traffic in England and Wales and Scotland. The act introduced provisions governing driving offences, licensing, insurance, vehicle use, and road-safety powers.

== Background ==
The act was passed to consolidate existing road-traffic laws and implement recommendations from the Law Commission and the Scottish Law Commission.

== Provisions ==
Category	Summary	Source
Dangerous and reckless driving	Creates offences for dangerous driving, reckless, and negligent driving, including causing death by dangerous driving.	
Drink- and drug-driving	Makes it an offence to drive or be in charge of a vehicle while under the influence or alcohol or drugs.	
Motor racing and motoring events	Regulates motor racing and other motoring events held on public highways.	
Driver licensing	Establishes the framework for issuing and regulating driving licences.	
Driving instruction	Regulates paid driving instruction and instructor registration.	
Third-party liability and insurance	Requires third-party risk insurance for vehicles used on public roads.	
Road-safety funding	Permits funding of road-safety training and information programmes.	
Foreign vehicles	Regulates the operation of foreign public service and goods vehicles in the UK.	

=== Repealed enactments ===
Section 205(1) of the act repealed 26 enactments, listed in part I of the ninth schedule to the act, and revoked 3 orders, listed in part II of that schedule.

Citation	Short title	Extent of repeal
5 & 6 Eliz. 2. c. 51	Road Transport Lighting Act 1957	The whole act.
6 & 7 Eliz. 2. c. 22	Road Transport Lighting (Amendment) Act 1958	The whole act.
8 & 9 Eliz. 2. c. 16	Road Traffic Act 1960	Parts I and II.
8 & 9 Eliz. 2. c. 16	Road Traffic Act 1960	Sections 183, 184 and 185.
8 & 9 Eliz. 2. c. 16	Road Traffic Act 1960	Sections 187 and 189 to 191.
8 & 9 Eliz. 2. c. 16	Road Traffic Act 1960	Parts V and VI.
8 & 9 Eliz. 2. c. 16	Road Traffic Act 1960	Sections 217 to 221.
8 & 9 Eliz. 2. c. 16	Road Traffic Act 1960	Sections 223 to 231.
8 & 9 Eliz. 2. c. 16	Road Traffic Act 1960	In section 232(1), in paragraph (a) the words " I, II or " and the words from " except " onwards, in paragraph (b) the words from " or subsection (5)" onwards, and paragraphs (c), (d) and (e); and in section 232(3) the words from " or " to " tricycle ".
8 & 9 Eliz. 2. c. 16	Road Traffic Act 1960	In section 233(1), paragraphs (b) and (e) to (h).
8 & 9 Eliz. 2. c. 16	Road Traffic Act 1960	In section 235, in subsection (1), paragraph (d), subsection (2) and in subsection (3) the words " or subsection (2) ".
8 & 9 Eliz. 2. c. 16	Road Traffic Act 1960	Sections 236 to 238.
8 & 9 Eliz. 2. c. 16	Road Traffic Act 1960	In section 239, the words from " (other than " to " sixty-five thereof)."
8 & 9 Eliz. 2. c. 16	Road Traffic Act 1960	Section 241.
8 & 9 Eliz. 2. c. 16	Road Traffic Act 1960	In section 244 the words " one hundred and ten, two hundred and one or" and " or two hundred and thirty-six ".
8 & 9 Eliz. 2. c. 16	Road Traffic Act 1960	In section 247(1) the words " subsection (7) of section one hundred and forty one or " and " or a fine imposed in respect of an offence under section 22 of the Vehicle and Driving Licences Act 1969 ".
8 & 9 Eliz. 2. c. 16	Road Traffic Act 1960	Section 250.
8 & 9 Eliz. 2. c. 16	Road Traffic Act 1960	Section 254.
8 & 9 Eliz. 2. c. 16	Road Traffic Act 1960	In section 255 the words " and of any other enactment relating to the use of motor vehicles on roads,".
8 & 9 Eliz. 2. c. 16	Road Traffic Act 1960	Section 256.
8 & 9 Eliz. 2. c. 16	Road Traffic Act 1960	In section 257(1) the definitions of " the appropriate Minister ", " bridge authority ", "bridleway", "footpath ", " highway authority", " salvage ", " special road ", " statutory ", " test certificate " and " traffic sign " and the words " except for the purposes of section one" qualifying the definition of " driver ".
8 & 9 Eliz. 2. c. 16	Road Traffic Act 1960	Section 259.
8 & 9 Eliz. 2. c. 16	Road Traffic Act 1960	In section 260, in subsection (1) the words from " or the Secretary of State" to "jointly", in subsection (2) the words from " or, as the case may be " to " jointly ", in subsection (3) the words from " (other than" to " Act) " and subsection (4).
8 & 9 Eliz. 2. c. 16	Road Traffic Act 1960	Sections 261 and 262.
8 & 9 Eliz. 2. c. 16	Road Traffic Act 1960	In section 263(1) the words " or V ".
8 & 9 Eliz. 2. c. 16	Road Traffic Act 1960	Schedules 8, 9, 15 and 16.
8 & 9 Eliz. 2. c. 16	Road Traffic Act 1960	In Schedule 17 the amendments of the Roads and Bridges (Scotland) Act 1878, the Burgh Police (Scotland) Act 1892, the Local Government (Scotland) Act 1947 and the Road Transport Lighting Act 1957.
8 & 9 Eliz. 2. c. 16	Road Traffic Act 1960	In Schedule 19, paragraphs 5(1), 7, 8 and 16.
8 & 9 Eliz. 2. c. 51	Road Traffic (Amendment) Act 1960	The whole act.
8 & 9 Eliz. 2. c. 63	Road Traffic and Roads Improvement Act 1960	Section 21.
8 & 9 Eliz. 2. c. 69	Road Traffic (Driving of Motor Cycles) Act 1960	The whole act.
10 & 11 Eliz. 2. c. 59	Road Traffic Act 1962	The whole act except sections 49, 51 and 52(1) and in Schedule 1, paragraphs 48, 49 and 51, and in Schedule 4 the amendments of sections 130 and 242 of the Road Traffic Act 1960.
1962 c. 13	Vehicles (Excise) Act 1962	In Schedule 7 the amendment of the Road Transport Lighting Act 1957.
1963 c. 33	London Government Act 1963	In section 9(6) the words " or the Road Traffic Act 1962 ".
1963 c. 33	London Government Act 1963	In section 14(6), paragraphs (a), (c) and (e).
1963 c. 33	London Government Act 1963	In section 15(1), the words "and the Road Traffic Act 1962 ".
1963 c. 33	London Government Act 1963	In Part I of Schedule 5, paragraphs 1, 13 to 16, 27, 28, 29, 32 and 34.
1965 c. 2	Administration of Justice Act 1965	In Schedule 1, the amendment of the Road Traffic Act 1960.
1967 c. 30	Road Safety Act 1967	The whole act.
1967 c. 55	Road Transport Lighting Act 1967	The whole act.
1967 c. 58	Criminal Law Act 1967	In Schedule 2, in paragraph 13, sub-paragraph (1)(e) and sub-paragraph (2).
1967 c. 70	Road Traffic (Amendment) Act 1967	The whole act except sections 8 and 10.
1967 c. 76	Road Traffic Regulation Act 1967	In Schedule 6, the amendment of the Road Transport Lighting Act 1957, the amendments of sections 14, 74, 98, 192, 237, 254, 255, 257 and 259 of the Road Traffic Act 1960 and the amendments of the Road Traffic Act 1962 and the Road Safety Act 1967.
1967 c. 79	Road Traffic (Driving Instruction) Act 1967	The whole act.
1967 c. 80	Criminal Justice Act 1967	Section 51.
1967 c. 80	Criminal Justice Act 1967	In section 56, subsections (8) to (12) and the definitions of " licence " and " Northern Ireland licence " in subsection (13).
1967 c. 80	Criminal Justice Act 1967	In Schedule 6, the amendment of the Road Traffic Act 1960 in paragraph 23.
1968 c. 29	Trade Descriptions Act 1968	In Schedule 1, paragraph 4.
1968 c. 41	Countryside Act 1968	Section 30(6) and (7).
1968 c. 59	Hovercraft Act 1968	In the Schedule, paragraph 4(a).
1968 c. 60	Theft Act 1968	In Part II of Schedule 2, the amendment of the Road Traffic Act 1962.
1968 c. 73	Transport Act 1968	In section 130(6), paragraph (d).
1968 c. 73	Transport Act 1968	In section 145, subsections (3) and (4).
1968 c. 73	Transport Act 1968	Section 146 and 148.
1968 c. 73	Transport Act 1968	In Schedule 10, in Part I the amendments of sections 183 and 232 of the Road Traffic Act 1960 and in the amendment of section 247 of that Act the words " the Act of 1960 or ", and in Part II the amendments of sections 183, 185 and 191 of the Road Traffic Act 1960 and the amendment of section 16 of the Road Safety Act 1967.
1968 c. 73	Transport Act 1968	In Schedule 11, in the amendment of section 247 of the Road Traffic Act 1960 the words " the Act of 1960 or " and the amendments of section 259 of and Schedule 14 to that Act.
1969 c. 27	Vehicle and Driving Licences Act 1969	Sections 13 to 15.
1969 c. 27	Vehicle and Driving Licences Act 1969	Section 16, except subsections (2) and (6).
1969 c. 27	Vehicle and Driving Licences Act 1969	Section 18.
1969 c. 27	Vehicle and Driving Licences Act 1969	In section 20(5) the words from " ; and for the purposes " onwards.
1969 c. 27	Vehicle and Driving Licences Act 1969	Sections 22 and 23.
1969 c. 27	Vehicle and Driving Licences Act 1969	In section 25, subsection (6).
1969 c. 27	Vehicle and Driving Licences Act 1969	In section 26, subsection (3).
1969 c. 27	Vehicle and Driving Licences Act 1969	Section 27, except so far as it relates to sections 1 and 2 of that Act.
1969 c. 27	Vehicle and Driving Licences Act 1969	Sections 31 and 32.
1969 c. 27	Vehicle and Driving Licences Act 1969	Section 35.
1969 c. 27	Vehicle and Driving Licences Act 1969	In Schedule 1, paragraphs 1, 2, 3 and 12.
1969 c. 27	Vehicle and Driving Licences Act 1969	Schedule 2, except paragraphs 8 and 11.
1969 c. 35	Transport (London) Act 1969	Section 9(2).
1970 c. 23	Road Traffic (Disqualification) Act 1970	The whole act.
1971 c. 36	Motor Vehicles (Passenger Insurance) Act 1971	The whole act.

Section 205(1) also revoked 3 orders, listed in part II of the ninth schedule to the act.

Citation	Short title	Extent of revocation
SI 1968/656	Fees for Inquiries (Variation) Order 1968	In the Schedule, the entry relating to the Road Traffic Act 1960.
SI 1968/1970	Road Traffic Accidents (Payments for Treatment) (England and Wales) Order 1968	The whole order.
SI 1968/1994	Road Traffic Accidents (Payments for Treatment) (Scotland) Order 1968	The whole order.

== Subsequent developments ==
The Transport Act 1980 amended parts of the act. The Road Traffic Act 1988 replaced or repealed several provisions. Section 36B (pavement-parking ban) originated in this act (via amendment in 1974).

The whole act was repealed by section 3(1) of, and part I of schedule 1 to, the Road Traffic (Consequential Provisions) Act 1988, which came into force on 15 May 1989.

== Reception and legal commentary ==
- Academic commentary has analysed how the act defined "reckless" and "dangerous" driving.
- The Act supports the Motor Vehicles (Third Party Risks) Regulations 1972.
