= Road Traffic Act 1960 =

Act of the Parliament of the United Kingdom

Road Traffic Act 1960 (Note: Section 271(1).)
- Act of Parliament
- Parliament of the United Kingdom
- Long title: An Act to consolidate, with corrections and improvements made under the Consolidation of Enactments (Procedure) Act, 1949, certain enactments relating to road traffic.
- Citation: 8 & 9 Eliz. 2. c. 16
- Territorial extent: England and Wales; Scotland; (Note: Section 271(2).)

Dates
- Royal assent: 22 March 1960
- Commencement: 1 September 1960 (Note: Section 270(1).)
Other legislation
Amends	See § Repealed enactments
Repeals/revokes	See § Repealed enactments
Amended by	Road Traffic (Driving of Motor Cycles) Act 1960; Road Traffic Act 1962; London Government Act 1963; Police Act 1964; Administration of Justice Act 1965; Criminal Law Act 1967; Road Traffic Regulation Act 1967; Police (Scotland) Act 1967; Theft Act 1968; Transport Act 1968; Vehicle and Driving Licences Act 1969; Motor Vehicles (Passenger Insurance) Act 1971; Road Traffic Act 1972; Criminal Justice Act 1972; Statute Law (Repeals) Act 1973; Statute Law (Repeals) Act 1974; Statute Law (Repeals) Act 1975; Transport Act 1980; Criminal Justice (Scotland) Act 1980; Public Passenger Vehicles Act 1981; Forgery and Counterfeiting Act 1981; Transfer of Functions (Transport) Order 1981; Road Traffic Acts 1960 and 1972, Road Traffic Regulation Act 1967, and Transport Act 1968 (Metrication) Regulations 1981; Road Traffic Acts 1960 and 1972, and Road Traffic Regulation Act 1967 (Metrication) (No.2) Regulations 1981; Road Traffic Regulation Act 1984; Roads (Scotland) Act 1984; Road Traffic Act 1988; Road Traffic (Consequential Provisions) Act 1988; Statute Law (Repeals) Act 1993; Deregulation and Contracting Out Act 1994; Goods Vehicles (Licensing of Operators) Act 1995; Courts Act 2003; Statute Law (Repeals) Act 2004; Judicial Review and Courts Act 2022

Status: Partially repealed

Text of statute as originally enacted

Revised text of statute as amended

Text of the Road Traffic Act 1960 as in force today (including any amendments) within the United Kingdom, from legislation.gov.uk.

The Road Traffic Act 1960 (8 & 9 Eliz. 2. c. 16) is an act of the Parliament of the United Kingdom consolidating prior road-traffic legislation. It provided statutory provisions on traffic offences, vehicle equipment and lighting, speed limits on restricted roads, control of motor trials, and the use of footpaths and bridleways by vehicles. The act has been partially amended and repealed by subsequent road traffic legislation.

== Background ==
The act was enacted to consolidate earlier statutes into a single system, with corrections and improvements under the Consolidation of Enactments (Procedure) Act 1949 (12, 13 & 14 Geo. 6. c. 33) . The bill, titled the Road Traffic and Roads Improvement Bill, was debated in both Houses of Parliament in 1960.

== Provisions ==
Significant areas covered by the act include:

Category	Section(s)	Description
Traffic offences	s.1–15	Driving offences, conduct rules.
Vehicle equipment	s.16–18	Lighting, reflectors, equipment.
Speed limits	s.19–20	Restricted road speed rules.
Footpaths & bridleways	s.21–23	Use of non-road rights of way.
Enforcement & penalties	s.24–30	Fines, prosecutions, summary offen.

=== Repealed enactments ===
Section 267(1) of the act repealed 47 enactments, listed in part I of the eighteenth schedule to the act, and revoked 5 orders and regulations, listed in part II of that schedule.

Part I - Enactments repealed
Citation	Short title	Extent of repeal
14 & 15 Geo. 5. c. 34	London Traffic Act 1924	The whole act.
15 & 16 Geo. 5. c. 71	Public Health Act 1925	Section sixty-eight.
20 & 21 Geo. 5. c. 43	Road Traffic Act 1930	Sections one to fifty.
20 & 21 Geo. 5. c. 43	Road Traffic Act 1930	In section fifty-seven, subsections (3) to (5).
20 & 21 Geo. 5. c. 43	Road Traffic Act 1930	Section fifty-nine.
20 & 21 Geo. 5. c. 43	Road Traffic Act 1930	In section sixty, paragraph (a).
20 & 21 Geo. 5. c. 43	Road Traffic Act 1930	Part IV.
20 & 21 Geo. 5. c. 43	Road Traffic Act 1930	In section one hundred and eight, subsection (2).
20 & 21 Geo. 5. c. 43	Road Traffic Act 1930	In section one hundred and ten, the words " within the meaning of the London Traffic Act, 1924 ".
20 & 21 Geo. 5. c. 43	Road Traffic Act 1930	Sections one hundred and eleven and one hundred and twelve.
20 & 21 Geo. 5. c. 43	Road Traffic Act 1930	In section one hundred and thirteen, in subsection (2), the words " for which no special penalty is provided " and subsection (3).
20 & 21 Geo. 5. c. 43	Road Traffic Act 1930	Section one hundred and sixteen.
20 & 21 Geo. 5. c. 43	Road Traffic Act 1930	In section one hundred and seventeen, the words from " or the regulations made thereunder " to " this Act ".
20 & 21 Geo. 5. c. 43	Road Traffic Act 1930	In section one hundred and nineteen, subsection (1), in subsection (3), the words from " or of section one hundred and twenty " to the end, subsections (5) and (6), in subsection (8), the words from " provided that " to the end, and subsection (10).
20 & 21 Geo. 5. c. 43	Road Traffic Act 1930	Section one hundred and twenty.
20 & 21 Geo. 5. c. 43	Road Traffic Act 1930	In section one hundred and twenty-one, in subsection (1), the definitions of " tramcar ", " owner ", " driver ", " prescribed ", " bridge authority ", " police authority ", " chief officer of police ", " police fund " and " salvage ", and subsection (2).
20 & 21 Geo. 5. c. 43	Road Traffic Act 1930	Section one hundred and twenty-two.
20 & 21 Geo. 5. c. 43	Road Traffic Act 1930	The Schedules.
21 & 22 Geo. 5. c. 32	Road Traffic (Amendment) Act 1931	The whole act.
23 & 24 Geo. 5. c. 14	London Passenger Transport Act 1933	In section fifty-one, subsection (2), in subsection (4), the words from " (b) that as regards " to " transferred to the said Commissioner of Police ", in subsection (5), paragraph (a), subsection (6) and, in subsection (7), the words " public service vehicles ".
23 & 24 Geo. 5. c. 14	London Passenger Transport Act 1933	Sections fifty-two, fifty-three, fifty-seven and fifty-eight.
23 & 24 Geo. 5. c. 14	London Passenger Transport Act 1933	In section fifty-nine, in subsection (1), paragraph (a), in paragraph (c) the word " either ", the words " the Act of 1924 or ", and the words from " The provisions " onwards.
23 & 24 Geo. 5. c. 14	London Passenger Transport Act 1933	Sections sixty, sixty-one, sixty-three and sixty-four.
23 & 24 Geo. 5. c. 14	London Passenger Transport Act 1933	In section one hundred and seven, in subsection (1), in the definition of " Advisory Committee ", the words from " as constituted " to the end, and the definitions of " London Traffic Area ", " public service vehicle ", " express carriage ", " contract carriage " and " stage carriage ".
23 & 24 Geo. 5. c. 14	London Passenger Transport Act 1933	The Eleventh, Twelfth and Thirteenth Schedules.
23 & 24 Geo. 5. c. 53	Road and Rail Traffic Act 1933	Part I.
23 & 24 Geo. 5. c. 53	Road and Rail Traffic Act 1933	The First Schedule.
24 & 25 Geo. 5. c. 50	Road Traffic Act 1934	Sections one to twenty-two.
24 & 25 Geo. 5. c. 50	Road Traffic Act 1934	Sections twenty-six to thirty-eight.
24 & 25 Geo. 5. c. 50	Road Traffic Act 1934	In section forty-one, paragraphs (1) to (7) and (9) to (12).
24 & 25 Geo. 5. c. 50	Road Traffic Act 1934	In section forty-two, in subsection (1), the words " and shall be " onwards, and subsection (2).
24 & 25 Geo. 5. c. 50	Road Traffic Act 1934	The First and Second Schedules.
24 & 25 Geo. 5. c. 50	Road Traffic Act 1934	The Third Schedule, except the entries therein relating to subsection (2) of section fifty-seven, and to section one hundred and seven, of the Road Traffic Act 1930.
25 & 26 Geo. 5. c. 47	Restriction of Ribbon Development Act 1935	Section sixteen.
25 & 26 Geo. 5. c. 47	Restriction of Ribbon Development Act 1935	In section twenty, subsection (2).
25 & 26 Geo. 5. c. 47	Restriction of Ribbon Development Act 1935	In section twenty-three, in subsection (2), the words from " and for the purposes " to the end.
25 & 26 Geo. 5. c. 47	Restriction of Ribbon Development Act 1935	In section twenty-five, in paragraph (2), the words " for any reference to section sixty-eight of the Public Health Act, 1925, there shall be substituted a reference to section one hundred and twenty of the Road Traffic Act, 1930 ", and paragraph (9).
26 Geo. 5. & 1 Edw. 8. c. 23	Road Traffic (Driving Licences) Act 1936	The whole act.
1 Edw. 8. & 1 Geo. 6. c. 5	Trunk Roads Act 1936	In the Second Schedule, the entries relating to sections forty-seven and forty-eight of the Road Traffic Act 1930, and section thirty of the Road and Rail Traffic Act 1933.
1 Edw. 8. & 1 Geo. 6. c. 5	Trunk Roads Act 1936	In the Third Schedule, in Part I, the entries relating to section forty-six of the Road Traffic Act 1930, and sections one and eighteen of the Road Traffic Act 1934.
1 Edw. 8. & 1 Geo. 6. c. 44	Road Traffic Act 1937	The whole act.
1 Edw. 8. & 1 Geo. 6. c. 52	Chairmen of Traffic Commissioners, &c. (Tenure of Office) Act 1937	Section one.
1 & 2 Geo. 6. c. 37	Street Playgrounds Act 1938	The whole act.
1 & 2 Geo. 6. c. 44	Road Haulage Wages Act 1938	In section seven, subsection (4).
1 & 2 Geo. 6. c. 48	Criminal Procedure (Scotland) Act 1938	Section seven.
2 & 3 Geo. 6. c. 31	Civil Defence Act 1939	In section ninety-one, subsection (6).
9 & 10 Geo. 6. c. 13	Finance (No. 2) Act 1945	Section five.
9 & 10 Geo. 6. c. 26	Emergency Laws (Transitional Provisions) Act 1946	In the Second Schedule, the entries relating to the Road and Rail Traffic Act 1933, and the Road Traffic Act 1934.
9 & 10 Geo. 6. c. 28	Assurance Companies Act 1946	The whole act.
9 & 10 Geo. 6. c. 30	Trunk Roads Act 1946	In section three, subsection (1).
9 & 10 Geo. 6. c. 81	National Health Service Act 1946	In the Tenth Schedule, the paragraph relating to the Road Traffic Acts, 1930 and 1934.
10 & 11 Geo. 6. c. 8	Road Traffic (Driving Licences) Act 1947	The whole act.
10 & 11 Geo. 6. c. 27	National Health Service (Scotland) Act 1947	In the Eleventh Schedule, the paragraph relating to the Road Traffic Acts, 1930 and 1934.
10 & 11 Geo. 6. c. 49	Transport Act 1947	Sections fifty-seven and seventy-three.
10 & 11 Geo. 6. c. 49	Transport Act 1947	In section one hundred and twenty-five, subsection (2).
11 & 12 Geo. 6. c. 58	Criminal Justice Act 1948	In section forty-one, subsection (2).
12, 13 & 14 Geo. 6. c. 32	Special Roads Act 1949	Section twelve.
12, 13 & 14 Geo. 6. c. 32	Special Roads Act 1949	In section sixteen, in subsection (1), the words from " and for prescribing " to the end.
14 Geo. 6. c. 24	Highways (Provision of Cattle-Grids) Act 1950	Section six.
14 Geo. 6. c. 39	Public Utilities Street Works Act 1950	In section twenty-seven, subsection (1).
15 & 16 Geo. 6. & 1 Eliz. 2. c. 55	Magistrates' Courts Act 1952	In the Fifth Schedule, the entry relating to the Road Traffic Act 1930.
1 & 2 Eliz. 2. c. 13	Transport Act 1953	Section nine.
1 & 2 Eliz. 2. c. 13	Transport Act 1953	In section eighteen, in subsection (2), the words from the beginning to the end of proviso (a), and, in subsection (4), paragraphs (b) and (c).
1 & 2 Eliz. 2. c. 13	Transport Act 1953	In section twenty-five, subsection (2).
1 & 2 Eliz. 2. c. 33	Education (Miscellaneous Provisions) Act 1953	In section twelve, subsection (2).
1 & 2 Eliz. 2. c. 36	Post Office Act 1953	In section eighty-seven, in subsection (1), the definition of " public service vehicle ".
1 & 2 Eliz. 2. c. 45	School Crossing Patrols Act 1953	The whole act.
1 & 2 Eliz. 2. c. 47	Emergency Laws (Miscellaneous Provisions) Act 1953	Sections seven and eight.
1 & 2 Eliz. 2. c. 47	Emergency Laws (Miscellaneous Provisions) Act 1953	In section thirteen, the words "seven, eight ".
1 & 2 Eliz. 2. c. 47	Emergency Laws (Miscellaneous Provisions) Act 1953	In the First Schedule, paragraphs 1 and 2.
2 & 3 Eliz. 2. c. 64	Transport Charges &c. (Miscellaneous Provisions) Act 1954	In section nine, in subsection (1), the words " public service vehicles ".
3 & 4 Eliz. 2. c. 18	Army Act 1955	In section one hundred and seventy-three, the words from " and section thirty-five " to the end.
3 & 4 Eliz. 2. c. 19	Air Force Act 1955	In section one hundred and seventy-three, the words from " and section thirty-five " to the end.
4 & 5 Eliz. 2. c. 6	Miscellaneous Financial Provisions Act 1955	In the First Schedule, the entry relating to the London Traffic Act 1924, paragraphs 3 and 4 of the entry relating to the Road Traffic Act 1930, and the entries relating to the Road and Rail Traffic Act 1933, and the Road Traffic Act 1934.
4 & 5 Eliz. 2. c. 67	Road Traffic Act 1956	Sections one to forty-four (except subsection (5) of section four).
4 & 5 Eliz. 2. c. 67	Road Traffic Act 1956	Sections forty-six to fifty-one.
4 & 5 Eliz. 2. c. 67	Road Traffic Act 1956	In section fifty-two, in subsection (1), the words " the Minister or of ", subsections (2) and (3), and, in subsection (4), the words " under Part I of the Local Government Act, 1948, or ".
4 & 5 Eliz. 2. c. 67	Road Traffic Act 1956	Section fifty-three.
4 & 5 Eliz. 2. c. 67	Road Traffic Act 1956	In section fifty-four, subsections (1) and (2).
4 & 5 Eliz. 2. c. 67	Road Traffic Act 1956	In section fifty-five, in subsection (1), the words from " and this Act " to the end, and subsections (3) and (4).
4 & 5 Eliz. 2. c. 67	Road Traffic Act 1956	The Schedules.
5 & 6 Eliz. 2. c. 29	Magistrates' Courts Act 1957	Section two and, in section six, in subsection (4), the word " two ".
5 & 6 Eliz. 2. c. 42	Parish Councils Act 1957	Section four.
5 & 6 Eliz. 2. c. 42	Parish Councils Act 1957	In section five, in subsection (1), the words " or any parking place " and, in subsection (4), the words " parking place (including any structure for use as a parking place) or other " and the words " parking place or other ", and subsection (5).
5 & 6 Eliz. 2. c. 44	National Health Service (Amendment) Act 1957	In section one, subsection (2).
5 & 6 Eliz. 2. c. 51	Road Transport Lighting Act 1957	In section eleven, in subsection (2), the words " and for the purposes of section eight of the Road Traffic Act 1934 ".
5 & 6 Eliz. 2. c. 51	Road Transport Lighting Act 1957	In section twelve, subsection (3).
5 & 6 Eliz. 2. c. 51	Road Transport Lighting Act 1957	In section eighteen, subsection (4).
5 & 6 Eliz. 2. c. 51	Road Transport Lighting Act 1957	Section twenty.
6 & 7 Eliz. 2. c. 50	Local Government (Omnibus Shelters and Queue Barriers) (Scotland) Act 1958	In section seven, in subsection (1), the definition of " public service vehicle ".
6 & 7 Eliz. 2. c. 55	Local Government Act 1958	In the Eighth Schedule, paragraphs 32 and 34 and, in paragraph 35, the words " and 34 ".
6 & 7 Eliz. 2. c. 64	Local Government and Miscellaneous Financial Provisions (Scotland) Act 1958	In the Fourth Schedule, paragraphs 18 and 20.
7 & 8 Eliz. 2. c. 25	Highways Act 1959	In section two hundred and ninety-five, in subsection (1), the definition of " London Traffic Area ".
7 & 8 Eliz. 2. c. 25	Highways Act 1959	In the Twenty-second Schedule, the entry relating to the Highways (Provision of Cattle-Grids) Act 1950.

Section 267(1) also revoked 5 orders and regulations, listed in part II of the eighteenth schedule to the act.

Part II - Orders and regulations revoked
Citation	Short title	Extent of revocation
SR&O 1934/1400	Metropolitan Traffic Area (Drivers' and Conductors' Licences) Order 1934	In Article 2, the definitions of " the Metropolitan Traffic Area ", " the Traffic Commissioner ", " the Act of 1930 " and " public service vehicle ".
SR&O 1934/1400	Metropolitan Traffic Area (Drivers' and Conductors' Licences) Order 1934	Part II.
SR&O 1940/2073	Variation of Traffic Areas (Scotland) Order 1940	The whole of the order.
SI 1955/1955	Transfer of Functions (Roads, Bridges and Ferries) Order 1955	In Article 6, paragraph (3).
SI 1955/1955	Transfer of Functions (Roads, Bridges and Ferries) Order 1955	In the First Schedule, in Part I, the entries relating to sections twenty-three, twenty-seven, thirty, forty-six, forty-seven, forty-eight and fifty-nine of the Road Traffic Act 1930, all the entries relating to the Road and Rail Traffic Act 1933, the Road Traffic Act 1934, the Street Playgrounds Act 1938, and the School Crossing Patrols Act 1953, in the entry relating to the Special Roads Act 1949, the words " except subsection (6) of section twelve ", and in the entry relating to the Highways (Provision of Cattle-Grids) Act 1950, the words " except subsection (2) of section six " and Part II.
SI 1957/340	Motor Vehicles (Variation of Speed Limit) Regulations 1956	The whole of the regulations.
SI 1959/1587	Metropolitan Traffic Area (Drivers' and Conductors' Licences) Order 1959	The whole of the order.

== Amendments and later legislation ==
The act has been partially repealed by later road traffic legislation, including successive Road Traffic Acts and the Road Traffic Regulation Act 1984. It was a consolidation statute and did not introduce radical policy changes, but subsequent amendments and reforms built on its structure.

== Parliamentary history ==
Debate on the bill is recorded in Hansard for both Houses. The discussions focused on enforcement, lighting provisions, and regulatory matters.

== Reception and legal commentary ==
The act has been cited in legal texts and academic literature as an important consolidation measurement in twentieth-century British road law, concerning road deaths and injuries. Contemporary annotated editions summarised its operation, and later scholarship references the act's role in developing subsequent legislation, including accident compensation and vehicle regulation legislation.

== Subsequent developments ==
Section 267(1) of, and schedule 18 to, the act were repealed by section 1 of, and part XI of the schedule to, the Statute Law (Repeals) Act 1974, which came into force on 27 June 1974.
