= List of statutory instruments of the United Kingdom, 1981 =

This is an incomplete list of statutory instruments of the United Kingdom in 1981.

== Statutory instruments ==
=== 1-499 ===
==== 1–100 ====
- County of Lancashire (Electoral Arrangements) Order 1981 (SI 1981/43)
- County of Northamptonshire (Electoral Arrangements) Order 1981 (SI 1981/49)
- County of Hampshire (Electoral Arrangements) Order 1981 (SI 1981/51)
- Blaenau Ffestiniog (Central Station) Light Railway Order 1981 (SI 1981/62)
- Bearsden and Milngavie District (Electoral Arrangements) Order 1981 (SI 1981/68)
- County of Cumbria (Electoral Arrangements) Order 1981 (SI 1981/79)
- County of Kent (Electoral Arrangements) Order 1981 (SI 1981/85)

== 101–200 ==
- The Gwent and Mid Glamorgan (Areas) Order 1981 S.I. 1981/113
- The County of Warwickshire (Electoral Arrangements) Order 1981 S.I. 1981/118
- The Sullom Voe Harbour Revision Order 1980 S.I. 1981/125 ??
- The County of Avon (Electoral Arrangements) Order 1981 S.I. 1981/131
- The North Kesteven (Parishes) Order 1981 S.I. 1981/134
- Food Labelling (Scotland) Regulations 1981 S.I. 1981/137
- The County of Essex (Electoral Arrangements) Order 1981 S.I. 1981/141
- The Preseli and South Pembrokeshire (Areas) Order 1981 S.I. 1981/145
- The Carmarthen and South Pembrokeshire (Areas) Order 1981 S.I. 1981/146
- The Sedgemoor (Parishes) Order 1981 S.I. 1981/148
- Road Traffic (Northern Ireland) Order 1981 S.I. 1981/154 (N.I. 1)
- Firearms (Northern Ireland) Order 1981 S.I. 1981/155 (N.I. 2)
- Housing (Northern Ireland) Order 1981 S.I. 1981/156 (N.I. 3)
- Clean Air (Northern Ireland) Order 1981 S.I. 1981/158 (N.I. 4)
- Leasehold (Enlargement and Extension) Amendment (Northern Ireland) Order 1981 S.I. 1981/159 (N.I. 5)
- The County of Wiltshire (Electoral Arrangements) Order 1981 S.I. 1981/165
- The County of Humberside (Electoral Arrangements) Order 1981 S.I. 1981/167
- The Afan (Communities) Order 1981 S.I. 1981/182
- The Oswestry (Parishes) Order 1981 S.I. 1981/186
- The County of Durham (Electoral Arrangements) Order 1981 S.I. 1981/190

== 201–300 ==
- Judgments Enforcement (Northern Ireland) Order 1981 (SI 1981/226 (N.I. 6))
- Fisheries Amendment (Northern Ireland) Order 1981 (SI 1981/227 (N.I. 7))
- Legal Aid, Advice and Assistance (Northern Ireland) Order 1981 (SI 1981/228 (N.I. 8))
- Weights and Measures (Northern Ireland) Order 1981 (SI 1981/231 (N.I. 10))
- The Hart (Parishes) Order 1981 (SI 1981/268)
- The City of Manchester (Electoral Arrangements) Order 1981 (SI 1981/284)
- The Colchester (Parishes) Order 1981 (SI 1981/286)
- The Macclesfield (Parishes) Order 1981 (SI 1981/287)
- The Tendring (Parishes) Order 1981 (SI 1981/288)

== 301–400 ==
- Merchant Shipping (Seamen's Documents) (Amendment) Regulations 1981 S.I. 1981/313
- Seeds (National Lists of Varieties) (Fees) (Amendment) Regulations 1981 S.I. 1981/342
- Merchant Shipping (Light Dues) Regulations 1981 S.I. 1981/354
- Town and Country Planning (Fees for Applications and Deemed Applications) Regulations 1981 S.I. 1981/369
- Act of Adjournal (Rules for Legal Aid in Criminal Proceedings Amendment) 1981 S.I. 1981/387
- Act of Adjournal (Criminal Legal Aid Fees Amendment) 1981 S.I. 1981/388
- Diving Operations at Work Regulations 1981 S.I. 1981/399

== 401–500 ==
- Agricultural Trust (Abolition) (Northern Ireland) Order 1981 S.I. 1981/435 (N.I. 11)
- Local Government, Planning and Land (Northern Ireland) Order 1981 S.I. 1981/437 (N.I. 13)
- Carriage by Air Acts (Application of Provisions) (Third Amendment) Order 1981 S.I. 1981/440
- The Dwyfor (Communities) Order 1981 S.I. 1981/453
- The East Kilbride District (Electoral Arrangements) Order 1981 S.I. 1981/489

== 501–600 ==
- National Health Service (Charges for Drugs and Appliances) Amendment Regulations 1981 S.I. 1981/501
- Magistrates' Courts Rules 1981 S.I. 1981/552
- The Renfrew District (Electoral Arrangements) Order 1981 S.I. 1981/554
- Merchant Shipping (Automatic Pilot and Testing of Steering Gear) Regulations 1981 S.I. 1981/571
- Merchant Shipping (Cargo Ship Construction and Survey) Regulations 1981 S.I. 1981/572
- Merchant Shipping (Cargo Ship Safety Equipment Survey) Regulations 1981 S.I. 1981/573
- Merchant Shipping (Radio Installations Surveys) Regulations 1981 S.I. 1981/583

== 601–700 ==
- Enterprise Zones (Northern Ireland) Order 1981 (SI 1981/607) (N.I. 15)
- Planning Blight (Compensation) (Northern Ireland) Order 1981 (SI 1981/608) (N.I. 16)
- Tyne and Wear County Council (Bowes Railway) Light Railway Order 1981 (SI 1981/616)
- City of Glasgow District (Electoral Arrangements) Order 1981 (SI 1981/620)
- Borough of Afan (Electoral Arrangements) Order 1981 (SI 1981/667)
- Diseases of Animals (Protein Processing) Order 1981 (SI 1981/676)

== 701–800 ==
- Hamilton District (Electoral Arrangements) Order 1981 (SI 1981/773)

== 801–900 ==
- Supplementary Benefit (Miscellaneous Amendments) Regulations 1981 (SI 1981/815)
- Town and Country Planning (General Development) (Scotland) Order 1981 (SI 1981/830)
- The Employment (Miscellaneous Provisions) (Northern Ireland) Order 1981 (SI 1981/839) (N.I. 20)
- The Kyle and Carrick District (Electoral Arrangements) Order 1981 (SI 1981/846)
- Traffic Signs Regulations and General Directions 1981 (SI 1981/859)

== 901–1000 ==
- Road Traffic Accidents (Payments for Emergency Treatment) (England and Wales) Order 1981 S.I. 1981/929
- Motor Vehicles (Driving Licences) Regulations 1981 S.I. 1981/952
- Road Traffic Accidents (Payments for Treatment) (Scotland) Order 1981 S.I. 1981/976

== 1001–1100 ==
- Teachers Colleges of Education (Scotland) Regulations 1981 (SI 1981/1017)
- Fresh Meat Export (Hygiene and Inspection) (Scotland) Regulations 1981 (SI 1981/1034)
- Industrial Training (Transfer of the Activities of Establishments) Order 1981 (SI 1981/1041)
- Dangerous Substances (Conveyance by Road in Road Tankers and Tank Containers) Regulations 1981 (SI 1981/1059)
- Elm, March and Outwell (Areas) Order 1981 (SI 1981/1074)
- Parish of Whittlesey Order 1981 (SI 1981/1075)
- Midland Railway Centre Light Railway Order 1981 (SI 1981/1083)
- Education (Schools and Further Education) Regulations 1981 (SI 1981/1086)
- Merchant Shipping (Submersible Craft Construction and Survey) Regulations 1981 (SI 1981/1098)

== 1101–1200 ==
- Diseases of Animals (Northern Ireland) Order 1981 S.I. 1981/1115
- Road Traffic (Car-Sharing Arrangements) (Northern Ireland) Order 1981 S.I. 1981/1117
- Double Taxation Relief (Taxes on Income) (Mauritius) Order 1981 S.I. 1981/1121
- Air Navigation (Restriction of Flying) (Scottish Highlands) Regulations 1981 S.I. 1981/1171

== 1201–1300 ==
- Pensions Increase (Review) Order 1981 S.I. 1981/1217

== 1301–1400 ==
- The Humberston and New Waltham (Areas) Order 1981 S.I. 1981/1326
- The Cheddar and Wedmore (Areas) Order 1981 S.I. 1981/1343
- The Eastleigh (Parishes) Order 1981 S.I. 1981/1348
- The Wansdyke (Parishes) Order 1981 S.I. 1981/1349

== 1401–1500 ==
- Act of Adjournal (Rules for Legal Aid in Criminal Proceedings Amendment No. 2) 1981 S.I. 1981/1443
- The Congleton (Parishes) Order 1981 S.I. 1981/1452
- The West Lindsey (Parishes) Order 1981 S.I. 1981/1453
- Merchant Shipping (Passenger Ship Classification) Regulations 1981 S.I. 1981/1472
- The Cumnock and Doon Valley District (Electoral Arrangements) Order 1981 S.I. 1981/1490

== 1501–1600 ==
- Supplementary Benefit (Aggregation) Regulations 1981 S.I. 1981/1524
- Supplementary Benefit (Claims and Payments) Regulations 1981 S.I. 1981/1525
- Supplementary Benefit (Conditions of Entitlement) Regulations 1981 S.I. 1981/1526
- Supplementary Benefit (Resources) Regulations 1981 S.I. 1981/1527
- Supplementary Benefit (Single Payments) Regulations 1981 S.I. 1981/1528
- Supplementary Benefit (Urgent Cases) Regulations 1981 S.I. 1981/1529
- Protected Shorthold Tenancies (Rent Registration) Order 1981 S.I. 1981/1578
- Protected Shorthold Tenancies (Notice to Tenant) Regulations 1981 S.I. 1981/1579
- Supreme Court Funds (Amendment) Rules 1981 S.I. 1981/1589
- The Inverclyde District (Electoral Arrangements) Order 1981 S.I. 1981/1595
- The South Norfolk (Parishes) Order 1981 S.I. 1981/1597

== 1601–1700 ==
- The Braintree (Parishes) Order 1981 S.I. 1981/1628
- The East Hampshire (Parishes) Order 1981 S.I. 1981/1629
- The Greater Manchester and Lancashire (Areas) Order 1981 S.I. 1981/1649
- The Langbaurgh (Parishes) Order 1981 S.I. 1981/1667
- Transfer of Functions (Minister for the Civil Service and Treasury) Order 1981 S.I. 1981/1670
- Magistrates' Courts (Northern Ireland) Order 1981 S.I. 1981/1675 (N.I. 26)
- The Aylesbury Vale (Parishes) Order 1981 S.I. 1981/1682
- County Court Rules 1981 S.I. 1981/1687
- The Greater London and Buckinghamshire (Areas) Order 1981 S.I. 1981/1696

== 1701–1800 ==
- Farm and Horticulture Development Regulations 1981 S.I. 1981/1707
- The Parish of Finedon Order 1981 S.I. 1981/1715
- Merchant Shipping (Means of Access) Regulations 1981 S.I. 1981/1729
- The Cynon Valley (Communities) Order 1981 S.I. 1981/1738
- Value Added Tax (Special Provisions) Order 1981 S.I. 1981/1741
- Merchant Shipping (Dangerous Goods) Regulations 1981 S.I. 1981/1747
- The County of Devon (Electoral Arrangements) Order 1981 S.I. 1981/1748
- County Courts Appeals Order 1981 S.I. 1981/1749
- The Sefton (Parishes) Order 1981 S.I. 1981/1773
- The Mid Suffolk (Parishes) Order 1981 S.I. 1981/1774
- Transfer of Undertakings (Protection of Employment) Regulations 1981 S.I. 1981/1794

== 1801–1900 ==
- Measuring Instruments (EEC Pattern Approval Requirements) (Fees) (No. 2) Regulations 1981 S.I. 1981/1825
- The Craven (Parishes) Order 1981 S.I. 1981/1827
- The Mole Valley (Parishes) Order 1981 S.I. 1981/1844
- The Fife Region (Electoral Arrangements) (Amendment) Order 1981 S.I. 1981/1866

== See also ==
- List of statutory instruments of the United Kingdom
