= List of acts of the Parliament of the United Kingdom from 1967 =

This is a list of acts of the Parliament of the United Kingdom passed in 1967.

Acts passed since 1963 are cited by calendar year, as opposed to the convention used for earlier acts of citing the regnal year(s) in which the relevant parliamentary session was held. Each act passed in a respective year is given a chapter number (abbreviated "c."), denoted by Arabic numerals in the case of public general acts, lowercase Roman numerals in the case of local acts, or italicised Arabic numerals in the case of personal acts. These run as separate series.

133 acts of Parliament were passed in 1967: 91 public general acts and 42 local acts.

indicates that an act has been transcribed on Wikisource, indicates that an act is available to view at legislation.gov.uk, and indicates the location of the original act in the Parliamentary Archives.

== Public general acts ==
Short title	Citation	Royal assent
Long title
Land Commission Act 1967 (repealed)	1967 c. 1	1 February 1967
An Act to provide for the establishment of a Land Commission, to make provision as to the finances of the Commission and to confer on the Commission powers to acquire, manage and dispose of land; to impose a betterment levy in respect of land; to make further provision as to compensation in respect of land acquired by authorities possessing compulsory purchase powers; to amend section 28 of, and Schedule 2 to, the Finance Act 1931; (Note: Finance Act 1931 (21 & 22 Geo. 5. c. 28)) and for purposes connected with the matters aforesaid. (Repealed by Statute Law (Repeals) Act 1998 (c. 43))
Consolidated Fund Act 1967 (repealed)	1967 c. 2	16 February 1967
An Act to apply a sum out of the Consolidated Fund to the service of the year ending on 31st March 1967. (Repealed by Statute Law (Repeals) Act 1971 (c. 52))
Education Act 1967 (repealed)	1967 c. 3	16 February 1967
An Act to enlarge the powers of the Secretary of State to make contributions, grants and loans in respect of aided schools and special agreement schools and to direct local education authorities to pay the expenses of establishing or enlarging controlled schools; and to provide for loans for capital expenditure incurred for purposes of colleges of education by persons other than local education authorities. (Repealed by Education Act 2002 (c. 32))
West Indies Act 1967	1967 c. 4	16 February 1967
An Act to confer on certain West Indian territories a new status of association with the United Kingdom, and to enable that status to be terminated at any time; to make provision for other matters in connection with, or consequential upon, the creation or termination of that status or other constitutional changes which may occur in relation to any of those territories; to make further provision as to grants under the Overseas Aid Act 1966; (Note: Overseas Aid Act 1966 (c. 21)) and for purposes connected with the matters aforesaid.
London Government Act 1967	1967 c. 5	16 February 1967
An Act to amend the provisions as to the election and retirement of councillors and aldermen of London borough councils and councillors of the Greater London Council; and for connected purposes.
Consolidated Fund (No. 2) Act 1967 (repealed)	1967 c. 6	22 March 1967
An Act to apply certain sums out of the Consolidated Fund to the service of the years ending on 31st March 1966, 1967 and 1968. (Repealed by Statute Law (Repeals) Act 1971 (c. 52))
Misrepresentation Act 1967	1967 c. 7	22 March 1967
An Act to amend the law relating to innocent misrepresentations and to amend sections 11 and 35 of the Sale of Goods Act 1893. (Note: Sale of Goods Act 1893 (56 & 57 Vict. c. 71))
Plant Health Act 1967	1967 c. 8	22 March 1967
An Act to consolidate the Destructive Insects and Pests Acts 1877 to 1927, together with section 11 of the Agriculture (Miscellaneous Provisions) Act 1949. (Note: Agriculture (Miscellaneous Provisions) Act 1949 (12, 13 & 14 Geo. 6. c. 37))
General Rate Act 1967 (repealed)	1967 c. 9	22 March 1967
An Act to consolidate certain enactments relating to rating and valuation in England and Wales. (Repealed by Local Government Finance Act 1988 (c. 41))
Forestry Act 1967	1967 c. 10	22 March 1967
An Act to consolidate the Forestry Acts 1919 to 1963 with corrections and improvements made under the Consolidation of Enactments (Procedure) Act 1949. (Note: Consolidation of Enactments (Procedure) Act 1949 (12, 13 & 14 Geo. 6. c. 33))
Export Guarantees Act 1967 (repealed)	1967 c. 11	22 March 1967
An Act to raise the limits on the liabilities which may be undertaken by the Board of Trade in respect of guarantees under sections 1 and 2 of the Export Guarantees Act 1949 (Note: Export Guarantees Act 1949 (12, 13 & 14 Geo. 6. c. 14)) and certain other transactions under the Export Guarantees Acts 1949 to 1964. (Repealed by Export Guarantees Act 1968 (c. 26))
Teachers' Superannuation Act 1967	1967 c. 12	22 March 1967
An Act to consolidate the enactments relating to the superannuation of teachers and certain other persons employed in connection with the provision of educational services.
Parliamentary Commissioner Act 1967	1967 c. 13	22 March 1967
An Act to make provision for the appointment and functions of a Parliamentary Commissioner for the investigation of administrative action taken on behalf of the Crown, and for purposes connected therewith.
Licensing (Certificates in Suspense) (Scotland) Act 1967	1967 c. 14	22 March 1967
An Act to provide for the abolition of the suspension of certificates for the sale by retail of exciseable liquor, and for the amendment of the procedure for the removal of existing certificates which are in suspense to premises other than those specified in the certificate and for purposes connected with the matters aforesaid.
Post Office (Borrowing Powers) Act 1967 (repealed)	1967 c. 15	22 March 1967
An Act to increase the limits imposed by section 10(2) of the Post Office Act 1961; (Note: Post Office Act 1961 (9 & 10 Eliz. 2. c. 15)) to provide that nothing in section 10(1) of that Act shall prevent the operation of a giro system; and for connected purposes. (Repealed by Post Office Act 1969 (c. 48))
Teachers of Nursing Act 1967	1967 c. 16	22 March 1967
An Act to amend section 17 of the Nurses Act 1957 (Note: Nurses Act 1957 (5 & 6 Eliz. 2. c. 15)) and section 6(1)(f) of the Nurses (Scotland) Act 1951. (Note: Nurses (Scotland) Act 1951 (14 & 15 Geo. 6. c. 55))
Iron and Steel Act 1967 (repealed)	1967 c. 17	22 March 1967
An Act to provide for the establishment of a National Steel Corporation and the transfer thereto of the securities of certain companies engaged in the production of steel and, in connection therewith, to revive certain provisions of the Iron and Steel Act 1949 (Note: Iron and Steel Act 1949 (12, 13 & 14 Geo. 6. c. 72)) and continue others in force and to amend certain of the revived provisions; to make fresh provision for the control of the provision of iron and steel production facilities; to dissolve the Iron and Steel Board and amend the provisions of the Iron and Steel Act 1953 concerning the Iron and Steel Holding and Realisation Agency; and for purposes connected with the matters aforesaid. (Repealed by %[%[Finance Act 1967]] (c. 54), %[%[National Loans Act 1968]] (c. 13), Iron and Steel Act 1969 (c. 45), Income and Corporation Taxes Act 1970 (c. 10), Tribunals and Inquiries Act 1971 (c. 62), Gas Act 1972 (c. 60), National Debt Act 1972 (c. 65), European Communities Act 1972 (c. 68), Finance Act 1973 (c. 51), [[House of Commons Disqualification Act 1975%]%] (c. 24) and [[Iron and Steel Act 1975%]%] (c. 64))
Local Government (Termination of Reviews) Act 1967 (repealed)	1967 c. 18	10 May 1967
An Act to dissolve the Local Government Commission for England and the Local Government Commission for Wales, to provide (with retrospective effect) for the discontinuance of reviews under Part II of the Local Government Act 1958 (Note: Local Government Act 1958 (6 & 7 Eliz. 2. c. 55)) and to repeal section 30(6) and certain related provisions of the London Government Act 1963. (Note: London Government Act 1963 (c. 33)) (Repealed by Statute Law (Repeals) Act 1976 (c. 16))
Private Places of Entertainment (Licensing) Act 1967 (repealed)	1967 c. 19	10 May 1967
An Act to provide for the licensing of certain private places of entertainment. (Repealed by Licensing Act 2003 (c. 17))
Housing (Financial Provisions, &c.) (Scotland) Act 1967 (repealed)	1967 c. 20	10 May 1967
An Act to make further provision for the giving of financial assistance towards the provision of houses in Scotland; to increase the amount of contributions payable in respect of hostels under section 89 of the Housing (Scotland) Act 1950; (Note: Housing (Scotland) Act 1950 (14 Geo. 6. c. 34)) to replace certain provisions as to the withholding, reduction, suspension, postponement, discontinuing or transfer of certain contributions; to make further provision for the Scottish Special Housing Association; to make provision in certain cases for the discharge or modification by the sheriff of heritable securities, charges and agreements on or relating to an unfit house; to revive section 12(6) of the Rent Act 1957 (Note: Rent Act 1957 (5 & 6 Eliz. 2. c. 25)) in its application to Scotland; and for matters connected with the aforesaid purposes. (Repealed by Housing (Scotland) Act 1987 (c. 26))
Road Traffic Act 1967 (repealed)	1967 c. 21	10 May 1967
An Act to remove the time-limit of five years imposed by section 13(1) of the Road Traffic and Roads Improvement Act 1960. (Note: Road Traffic and Roads Improvement Act 1960 (8 & 9 Eliz. 2. c. 63)) (Repealed by Road Traffic Regulation Act 1967 (c. 76))
Agriculture Act 1967	1967 c. 22	10 May 1967
An Act to establish a Meat and Livestock Commission and make other provision for the livestock and livestock products industries, to amend the Agriculture (Calf Subsidies) Act 1952 (Note: Agriculture (Calf Subsidies) Act 1952 (15 & 16 Geo. 6 & 1 Eliz. 2. c. 62)) and make new provision with respect to the supervision and enforcement of schemes under that Act, to authorise the payment of subsidies in respect of cows maintained for the purpose of breeding calves for beef, to authorise grants for improvements of agricultural land and in respect of expenditure on equipment, plant and machinery for use in agriculture, and on certain vehicles, and supplementary grants in respect of certain expenditure, and to make provision with respect to the shape and size of farms and related matters, agriculture and forestry on hill land, cooperative activities in agriculture, diseases of animals and other matters connected with agriculture.
Royal Assent Act 1967	1967 c. 23	10 May 1967
An Act to amend the law relating to the signification of Her Majesty's Royal Assent.
Slaughter of Poultry Act 1967	1967 c. 24	10 May 1967
An Act to provide for the humane slaughter, for certain commercial purposes, of poultry.
National Insurance (Industrial Injuries) (Amendment) Act 1967 (repealed)	1967 c. 25	10 May 1967
An Act to amend the enactments providing for benefits out of the Industrial Injuries Fund in respect of industrial diseases; and for connected purposes. (Repealed by Social Security (Consequential Provisions) Act 1975 (c. 18))
Merchant Shipping Act 1967 (repealed)	1967 c. 26	10 May 1967
An Act to amend section 92 of the Merchant Shipping Act 1894. (Note: Merchant Shipping Act 1894 (57 & 58 Vict. c. 60)) (Repealed by Merchant Shipping Act 1970 (c. 36))
Merchant Shipping (Load Lines) Act 1967	1967 c. 27	10 May 1967
An Act to make further provision as to load lines and related matters; to increase penalties under certain provisions of the Merchant Shipping Acts 1894 to 1965 relating to passenger steamers; and for purposes connected with the matters aforesaid.
Superannuation (Miscellaneous Provisions) Act 1967	1967 c. 28	10 May 1967
An Act to amend the law relating to pensions and other similar payments to or in respect of persons who have been in certain employment, and for connected purposes.
Housing Subsidies Act 1967 (repealed)	1967 c. 29	10 May 1967
An Act to make provision with respect to financial assistance towards the provision, acquisition or improvement of dwellings and the provision of hostels; and for connected purposes. (Repealed by Housing (Consequential Provisions) Act 1985 (c. 71))
Road Safety Act 1967 (repealed)	1967 c. 30	10 May 1967
An Act to make further provision with respect to persons driving or being in charge of motor vehicles after consuming alcohol or taking drugs and with respect to goods vehicles and to empower constables to arrest persons suspected of driving or attempting to drive while disqualified. (Repealed by Road Traffic Act 1972 (c. 20))
Commonwealth Settlement Act 1967 (repealed)	1967 c. 31	10 May 1967
An Act to extend the period for which the Secretary of State may make contributions under schemes agreed under section 1 of the Empire Settlement Act 1922. (Note: Empire Settlement Act 1922 (12 & 13 Geo. 5. c. 13)) (Repealed by Statute Law (Repeals) Act 1976 (c. 16))
Development of Inventions Act 1967	1967 c. 32	10 May 1967
An Act to consolidate the Development of Inventions Act 1948, (Note: Development of Inventions Act 1948 (11 & 12 Geo. 6. c. 60)) the Development of Inventions Act 1954 (Note: Development of Inventions Act 1954 (2 & 3 Eliz. 2. c. 20)) and the Development of Inventions Act 1965. (Note: Development of Inventions Act 1965 (c. 21))
Air Corporations Act 1967 (repealed)	1967 c. 33	10 May 1967
An Act to consolidate, with certain exceptions, the provisions of the Air Corporations Acts 1949 to 1966. (Repealed by Civil Aviation Act 1978 (c. 8))
Industrial Injuries and Diseases (Old Cases) Act 1967 (repealed)	1967 c. 34	12 June 1967
An Act to consolidate certain enactments relating to workmen's compensation or other benefit in respect of employment before 5th July 1948. (Repealed by Social Security (Consequential Provisions) Act 1975 (c. 18))
Fishing Vessel Grants Act 1967 (repealed)	1967 c. 35	28 June 1967
An Act to repeal the statutory limits on the amount that may be paid by way of any grant in pursuance of a scheme under section 1 or 6 of the White Fish and Herring Industries Act 1953 (Note: White Fish and Herring Industries Act 1953 (1 & 2 Eliz. 2. c. 17)) in respect of expenditure consisting of payments made on or after 1st January 1967. (Repealed by Sea Fisheries Act 1968 (c. 77))
Remuneration of Teachers (Scotland) Act 1967 (repealed)	1967 c. 36	28 June 1967
An Act to make new provision for determining the remuneration of teachers in Scotland; and for purposes connected therewith. (Repealed by Education (Scotland) Act 1980 (c. 44))
Deer (Amendment) (Scotland) Act 1967 (repealed)	1967 c. 37	28 June 1967
An Act to amend sections 15 and 33 of the Deer (Scotland) Act 1959. (Repealed by Deer (Scotland) Act 1996 (c. 58))
Refreshment Houses Act 1967 (repealed)	1967 c. 38	28 June 1967
An Act to amend the Refreshment Houses Acts 1860 (Note: Refreshment Houses Act 1860 (23 & 24 Vict. c. 27)) and 1964; (Note: Refreshment Houses Act 1964 (c. 88)) and for purposes connected therewith. (Repealed by Late Night Refreshment Houses Act 1969 (c. 53))
National Health Service (Family Planning) Act 1967	1967 c. 39	28 June 1967
An Act to secure the provision, as part of the National Health Service, by local health authorities of services in connection with family planning.
Shipbuilding Industry Act 1967 (repealed)	1967 c. 40	28 June 1967
An Act to provide for the establishment of a public board with the function of promoting the ability of the shipbuilding industry in the United Kingdom to compete in world markets; to enable the board to give financial assistance to persons carrying on shipbuilding undertakings and marine engine manufacturing undertakings; to enable the Minister of Technology to give guarantees in connection with the construction of ships in shipyards situated in the United Kingdom and the equipment of ships constructed in such shipyards; and for connected purposes. (Repealed by Industry Act 1972 (c. 63))
Marine, &c., Broadcasting (Offences) Act 1967 or the Marine Broadcasting Offences Act 1967 or the Marine Offences Act 1967 (repealed)	1967 c. 41	14 July 1967
An Act to suppress broadcasting from ships, aircraft and certain marine structures. (Repealed by Wireless Telegraphy Act 2006 (c. 36))
Advertisements (Hire-Purchase) Act 1967 (repealed)	1967 c. 42	14 July 1967
An Act to consolidate the enactments relating to the contents of advertisements displayed or issued in connection with hire-purchase or credit-sale. (Repealed by Consumer Credit Act 1974 (c. 39))
Legal Aid (Scotland) Act 1967 (repealed)	1967 c. 43	14 July 1967
An Act to consolidate certain enactments relating to legal aid and advice in Scotland and connected matters. (Repealed by Legal Aid (Scotland) Act 1986 (c. 47))
Public Records Act 1967	1967 c. 44	14 July 1967
An Act to reduce the period of fifty years specified in section 5(1) of the Public Records Act 1958 (Note: Public Records Act 1958 (6 & 7 Eliz. 2. c. 51)) as that for which certain public records must have been in existence for them to be available for public inspection.
Uniform Laws on International Sales Act 1967	1967 c. 45	14 July 1967
An Act to give effect to two Conventions with respect to the international sale of goods; and for purposes connected therewith.
Protection of Birds Act 1967	1967 c. 46	14 July 1967
An Act to amend the law relating to the protection of birds.
Decimal Currency Act 1967 (repealed)	1967 c. 47	14 July 1967
An Act to provide for the introduction of a decimal currency in the year 1971; and to regulate the constitution and functions of the Decimal Currency Board. (Repealed by Statute Law (Repeals) Act 1986 (c. 12))
Industrial and Provident Societies Act 1967 or the Co-operative and Community Benefit Societies and Credit Unions Act 1967 (repealed)	1967 c. 48	14 July 1967
An Act to facilitate the borrowing of money by registered societies within the meaning of the Industrial and Provident Societies Act 1965; (Note: Industrial and Provident Societies Act 1965 (c. 12)) and for connected purposes. (Repealed by Co-operative and Community Benefit Societies Act 2014 (c. 14))
Llangollen International Musical Eisteddfod Act 1967 (repealed)	1967 c. 49	14 July 1967
An Act to make further provision for contributions by local authorities in Wales (including Monmouthshire) towards the expense of the Llangollen International Musical Eisteddfod. (Repealed by Statute Law (Repeals) Act 2004 (c. 14))
Farm and Garden Chemicals Act 1967 (repealed)	1967 c. 50	14 July 1967
An Act to make provision for the labelling of farm and garden chemicals, and matters related thereto. (Repealed by Deregulation Act 2015 (c. 20))
Licensing (Amendment) Act 1967 (repealed)	1967 c. 51	14 July 1967
An Act to amend Part VII of the Licensing Act 1964 (Note: Licensing Act 1964 (c. 26)) in regard to the provision of off-licences in licensing planning areas. (Repealed by Licensing Act 2003 (c. 17))
Tokyo Convention Act 1967 (repealed)	1967 c. 52	14 July 1967
An Act to make provision with a view to the ratification on behalf of the United Kingdom of the Convention on Offences and certain other Acts Committed on board Aircraft, signed in Tokyo on 14th September 1963, and to give effect to certain provisions relating to piracy of the Convention on the High Seas, signed in Geneva on 29th April 1958; and for purposes connected with the matters aforesaid. (Repealed by Merchant Shipping and Maritime Security Act 1997 (c. 28))
Prices and Incomes Act 1967 (repealed)	1967 c. 53	14 July 1967
An Act to make, in relation to prices and charges and in relation to terms and conditions of employment, further provision to supplement or amend the Prices and Incomes Act 1966. (Note: Prices and Incomes Act 1966 (c. 33)) (Repealed by Statute Law (Repeals) Act 1989 (c. 43))
Finance Act 1967	1967 c. 54	21 July 1967
An Act to grant certain duties, to alter other duties, and to amend the law relating to the National Debt and the Public Revenue, and to make further provision in connection with Finance.
Road Transport Lighting Act 1967 (repealed)	1967 c. 55	21 July 1967
An Act to resolve doubts as to the application of the Road Transport Lighting Act 1957 (Note: Road Transport Lighting Act 1957 (5 & 6 Eliz. 2. c. 51)) to reflecting material; to confer power on the Minister of Transport to require or authorise lights of prescribed colours to be shown to the rear of vehicles; and to restrict the carrying by vehicles of certain illuminated signalling devices. (Repealed by Road Traffic Act 1972 (c. 20))
Matrimonial Causes Act 1967	1967 c. 56	21 July 1967
An Act to confer jurisdiction on county courts in certain matrimonial proceedings; and for purposes connected therewith.
Control of Liquid Fuel Act 1967 (repealed)	1967 c. 57	21 July 1967
An Act to make temporary provision for controlling the supply, acquisition and consumption of liquid fuel and of lubricating oil and grease, and for purposes connected therewith. (Repealed by Statute Law (Repeals) Act 1973 (c. 39))
Criminal Law Act 1967	1967 c. 58	21 July 1967
An Act to amend the law of England and Wales by abolishing the division of crimes into felonies and misdemeanours and to amend and simplify the law in respect of matters arising from or related to that division or the abolition of it; to do away (within or without England and Wales) with certain obsolete crimes together with the torts of maintenance and champerty; and for purposes connected therewith.
Appropriation Act 1967 (repealed)	1967 c. 59	27 July 1967
An Act to apply a sum out of the Consolidated Fund to the service of the year ending on 31st March 1968, and to appropriate the further supplies granted in this Session of Parliament. (Repealed by Statute Law (Repeals) Act 1971 (c. 52))
Sexual Offences Act 1967	1967 c. 60	27 July 1967
An Act to amend the law of England and Wales relating to homosexual acts.
Public Works Loans Act 1967	1967 c. 61	27 July 1967
An Act to make further provision with respect to loans out of the Local Loans Fund.
Post Office (Data Processing Service) Act 1967	1967 c. 62	27 July 1967
An Act to authorise the payment out of the Post Office Fund of the expenses of the Postmaster General in providing services and facilities for the processing of data by computer, and to impose an obligation of secrecy in connection with the provision by him of such services and facilities.
Bermuda Constitution Act 1967	1967 c. 63	27 July 1967
An Act to provide for the grant of a new constitution for Bermuda.
Anchors and Chain Cables Act 1967 (repealed)	1967 c. 64	27 July 1967
An Act to make new provision in substitution for the Anchors and Chain Cables Act 1899. (Note: Anchors and Chain Cables Act 1899 (62 & 63 Vict. c. 23)) (Repealed by Merchant Shipping (Registration, etc.) Act 1993 (c. 22))
Antarctic Treaty Act 1967	1967 c. 65	27 July 1967
An Act to enable effect to be given to measures for the conservation of Antarctic fauna and flora which, in pursuance of the Antarctic Treaty signed at Washington on 1st December 1959, have been or may hereafter be recommended for approval by contracting parties to that treaty; and for other purposes connected with the Antarctic Treaty.
Welsh Language Act 1967 (repealed)	1967 c. 66	27 July 1967
An Act to make further provision with respect to the Welsh language and references in Acts of Parliament to Wales. (Repealed by Welsh Language Act 1993 (c. 38))
Irish Sailors and Soldiers Land Trust Act 1967	1967 c. 67	27 July 1967
An Act to enable the Irish Sailors and Soldiers Land Trust to provide, or assist in the provision of, living accommodation other than cottages; and to extend the powers of the Trust to sell cottages to the widows of former tenants.
Fugitive Offenders Act 1967 (repealed)	1967 c. 68	27 July 1967
An Act to make fresh provision for the return from the United Kingdom to other Commonwealth countries and United Kingdom dependencies of persons accused or convicted of offences in those countries and dependencies; to regulate the treatment of persons accused or convicted of offences in the United Kingdom who are returned from such countries and dependencies; to authorise the making of corresponding provisions for United Kingdom dependencies, including provisions for the return from such dependencies of persons accused or convicted in the Republic of Ireland; and for purposes connected with the matters aforesaid. (Repealed by Extradition Act 1989 (c. 33))
Civic Amenities Act 1967	1967 c. 69	27 July 1967
An Act to make further provision for the protection and improvement of buildings of architectural or historic interest and of the character of areas of such interest; for the preservation and planting of trees; and for the orderly disposal of disused vehicles and equipment and other rubbish.
Road Traffic (Amendment) Act 1967	1967 c. 70	27 July 1967
An Act to make provision for securing compliance with the requirements imposed by law as to the use of motor vehicles and trailers on roads and their construction, equipment, weight and condition, and for exempting persons convicted of offences against such requirements from the consequences of conviction, and to remove doubts about the extent of the power to make Orders under the Motor Vehicles (International Circulation) Act 1952. (Note: Motor Vehicles (International Circulation) Act 1952 (15 & 16 Geo. 6 & 1 Eliz. 2. c. 39))
Aden, Perim and Kuria Muria Islands Act 1967 (repealed)	1967 c. 71	27 July 1967
An Act to make provision for, and in connection with, the relinquishment of Her Majesty's sovereignty over Aden, Perim and the Kuria Muria Islands, and to amend the definition of "Governor" in section 32(1) of the British Nationality Act 1948. (Note: British Nationality Act 1948 (11 & 12 Geo. 6. c. 56)) (Repealed by Statute Law (Repeals) Act 1995 (c. 44))
Wireless Telegraphy Act 1967 (repealed)	1967 c. 72	27 July 1967
An Act to enable the Postmaster General to obtain information as to the sale and hire of television receiving sets; to enable him to prohibit the manufacture or importation of certain wireless telegraphy apparatus; to make provision for requiring applicants for vehicle excise licences to give information about such apparatus installed in vehicles; to make miscellaneous amendments in the Wireless Telegraphy Act 1949; (Note: Wireless Telegraphy Act 1949 (12, 13 & 14 Geo. 6. c. 54)) and for connected purposes. (Repealed by Enterprise and Regulatory Reform Act 2013 (c. 24))
National Insurance Act 1967 (repealed)	1967 c. 73	27 July 1967
An Act to amend the provisions of the National Insurance Act 1965, (Note: National Insurance Act 1965 (c. 51)) the National Insurance (Industrial Injuries) Act 1965 (Note: National Insurance (Industrial Injuries) Act 1965 (c. 52)) and the Industrial Injuries and Diseases (Old Cases) Act 1967 (Note: Industrial Injuries and Diseases (Old Cases) Act 1967 (c. 34)) as to contributions, benefit and insurable employments; to provide for the set-off of certain overpayments; to confer temporary power to increase family allowances by order; and for connected purposes. (Repealed by Social Security (Consequential Provisions) Act 1975 (c. 18))
Greenwich Hospital Act 1967	1967 c. 74	27 July 1967
An Act to amend the enactments relating to Greenwich Hospital in respect of the investment of capital money and the annual estimates of income and expenditure.
Matrimonial Homes Act 1967 (repealed)	1967 c. 75	27 July 1967
An Act to amend the law of England and Wales as to the rights of a husband or wife to occupy a dwelling house which has been the matrimonial home; and for connected purposes. (Repealed by Matrimonial Homes Act 1983 (c. 19) and County Courts Act 1984 (c. 28))
Road Traffic Regulation Act 1967 (repealed)	1967 c. 76	27 July 1967
An Act to consolidate certain enactments relating to road traffic, with corrections and minor improvements made under the Consolidation of Enactments (Procedure) Act 1949. (Repealed by Statute Law (Repeals) Act 2004 (c. 14))
Police (Scotland) Act 1967 (repealed)	1967 c. 77	27 July 1967
An Act to consolidate certain enactments relating to police forces in Scotland and to the execution of warrants in the border counties of England and Scotland and to repeal certain provisions relating to the police in Scotland which have ceased to have any effect. (Repealed by Police and Fire Reform (Scotland) Act 2012 (asp 8))
Water (Scotland) Act 1967 (repealed)	1967 c. 78	27 July 1967
An Act to provide for the establishment of regional water boards and a Central Scotland Water Development Board, and the transfer to those boards of functions in relation to water supply in Scotland previously exercisable by local water authorities, to confer on the Central Scotland Water Development Board functions in relation to the bulk supply of water to their constituent regional water boards, to enable other regional water boards and water development boards to be established by order of the Secretary of State, to amend the Water (Scotland) Acts 1946 (Note: Water (Scotland) Act 1946 (9 & 10 Geo. 6. c. 42)) and 1949; (Note: Water (Scotland) Act 1949 (12, 13 & 14 Geo. 6. c. 31)) and for purposes connected with the matters aforesaid. (Repealed by Local Government etc. (Scotland) Act 1994 (c. 39))
Road Traffic (Driving Instruction) Act 1967 (repealed)	1967 c. 79	27 July 1967
An Act to provide for the registration of persons engaged in giving instruction in the driving of motor vehicles and for connected purposes. (Repealed by Road Traffic Act 1972 (c. 20))
Criminal Justice Act 1967	1967 c. 80	27 July 1967
An Act to amend the law relating to the proceedings of criminal courts, including the law relating to evidence, and to the qualification of jurors, in such proceedings and to appeals in criminal cases; to reform existing methods and provide new methods of dealing with offenders; to make further provision for the treatment of offenders, the management of prisons and other institutions and the arrest of offenders unlawfully at large; to make further provision with respect to legal aid and advice in criminal proceedings; to amend the law relating to firearms and ammunition; to alter the penalties which may be imposed for certain offences; and for connected purposes.
Companies Act 1967 (repealed)	1967 c. 81	27 July 1967
An Act to amend the law relating to companies, insurance, partnerships and moneylenders. (Repealed by Financial Services and Markets Act 2000 (Consequential Amendments and Savings) (Industrial Assurance) Order 2001 (SI 2001/3647))
Dangerous Drugs Act 1967 (repealed)	1967 c. 82	27 October 1967
An Act to provide for the control of drug addiction and to make further provision with respect to drugs. (Repealed by Misuse of Drugs Act 1971 (c. 38))
Sea Fisheries (Shellfish) Act 1967	1967 c. 83	27 October 1967
An Act to consolidate certain enactments relating to shellfish fisheries and shellfish, with amendments to give effect to recommendations of the Law Commission and the Scottish Law Commission.
Sea Fish (Conservation) Act 1967	1967 c. 84	27 October 1967
An Act to consolidate (with corrections and improvements made under the Consolidation of Enactments (Procedure) Act 1949) certain enactments which provide for regulating the commercial use of, fishing for, and landing of, sea fish, and for authorising measures for the increase or improvement of marine resources.
Vessels Protection Act 1967 (repealed)	1967 c. 85	27 October 1967
An Act to make it an offence to take away a vessel without authority or to use or be a party to the use of a vessel so taken; and for purposes connected therewith. (Repealed by Theft Act 1968 (c. 60))
Countryside (Scotland) Act 1967	1967 c. 86	27 October 1967
An Act to make provision for the better enjoyment of the Scottish countryside, for the establishment of a Countryside Commission for Scotland and for the improvement of recreational and other facilities; to extend the powers of local planning authorities as respects land in their districts; to make financial provision with respect to the matters aforesaid; and for connected purposes.
Abortion Act 1967	1967 c. 87	27 October 1967
An Act to amend and clarify the law relating to termination of pregnancy by registered medical practitioners.
Leasehold Reform Act 1967	1967 c. 88	27 October 1967
An Act to enable tenants of houses held on long leases at low rents to acquire the freehold or an extended lease; to apply the Rent Acts to premises held on long leases at a rackrent, and to bring the operation of the Landlord and Tenant Act 1954 (Note: Landlord and Tenant Act 1954 (2 & 3 Eliz. 2. c. 56)) into conformity with the Rent Acts as so amended; to make other changes in the law in relation to premises held on long leases, including amendments of the Places of Worship (Enfranchisement) Act 1920; (Note: Places of Worship (Enfranchisement) Act 1920 (10 & 11 Geo. 5. c. 56)) and for purposes connected therewith.
Expiring Laws Continuance Act 1967 (repealed)	1967 c. 89	20 December 1967
An Act to continue certain expiring laws. (Repealed by Statute Law (Repeals) Act 1971 (c. 52))
Family Allowances and National Insurance Act 1967	1967 c. 90	20 December 1967
An Act to increase family allowances under the Family Allowances Act 1965 (Note: Family Allowances Act 1965 (c. 53)) and make related adjustments of certain benefits under the National Insurance Act 1965 or the National Insurance (Industrial Injuries) Act 1965, to make further provision as to the time at which a person ceases to be a child within the meaning of those Acts, and for purposes connected therewith.
Coal Industry Act 1967	1967 c. 91	20 December 1967
An Act to make further provision with respect to borrowing by and grants to the National Coal Board; to provide for supplementary payments to redundant workers in the coal industry, for the reimbursement to the Board of contributions to retirement benefits to or in respect of such workers and of losses incurred by the Board in deferring the closure of coal mines and for the reimbursement to boards generating electricity or producing gas of the additional cost of using coal in pursuance of an arrangement made with the Minister of Power or the Secretary of State; and for connected purposes.

== Local acts ==
Short title	Citation	Royal assent
Long title
London Bridge Act 1967	1967 c. i	16 February 1967
An Act to empower the Corporation of London to reconstruct London Bridge, to construct other works and to acquire lands compulsorily; and for other purposes.
Glasgow Corporation Order Confirmation Act 1967	1967 c. ii	22 March 1967
An Act to confirm a Provisional Order under the Private Legislation Procedure (Scotland) Act 1936, (Note: Private Legislation Procedure (Scotland) Act 1936 (26 Geo. 5 & 1 Edw. 8. c. 52)) relating to Glasgow Corporation.
	Glasgow Corporation Order 1967 Provisional Order to confer powers on the Corporation of the city of Glasgow with respect to the feuing of their Ardgoil Estate; to make further provision for facilitating the protection and maintenance of their tunnels under the river Clyde between Linthouse and Whiteinch; to authorise the Corporation to make byelaws for regulating the use of the Glasgow Airport at Abbotsinch in the county of Renfrew; and for other purposes.	
Greenock Corporation Order Confirmation Act 1967	1967 c. iii	22 March 1967
An Act to confirm a Provisional Order under the Private Legislation Procedure (Scotland) Act 1936, relating to Greenock Corporation.
	Greenock Corporation Order 1967 Provisional Order to confer powers on the Corporation of Greenock with respect to lands held for parks and for other purposes.	
Tees Valley and Cleveland Water Act 1967	1967 c. iv	22 March 1967
An Act to authorise the Tees Valley and Cleveland Water Board to construct works and to acquire lands; and for other purposes.
Edinburgh Corporation Order Confirmation Act 1967	1967 c. v	10 May 1967
An Act to confirm a Provisional Order under the Private Legislation Procedure (Scotland) Act 1936, relating to Edinburgh Corporation.
	Edinburgh Corporation Order 1967 Provisional Order to consolidate with amendments the Acts and Orders relating to the Corporation of the city of Edinburgh (other than the Acts and Orders of the Corporation relating to their water undertaking) and to confer further powers on them with respect to their various undertakings and services and to the municipal government and administration of the city; to consolidate with amendments the provisions of the Edinburgh Corporation Order 1964 relative to the Edinburgh Sheriff Court House Commissioners; and for other purposes.	
Mersey Docks and Harbour Board Act 1967	1967 c. vi	10 May 1967
An Act to amend and extend the financial provisions relating to the Mersey Docks and Harbour Board; and for other purposes.
Saint Mary-le-Park, Battersea Act 1967	1967 c. vii	10 May 1967
An Act to provide for the demolition of the church of Saint Mary-le-Park, Battersea, and of the church hall adjacent thereto; to provide for the erection of a new church and other buildings on part of the site of the existing church and church hall; to authorise the use for other purposes of other parts of the said site; and for purposes incidental thereto.
Bath University of Technology Act 1967	1967 c. viii	10 May 1967
An Act to dissolve the Bristol College of Science and Technology and to transfer all rights, property and liabilities of that college to the Bath University of Technology; to provide for the pooling of investments and moneys of certain endowment funds of the Bath University of Technology; and for other purposes.
Newcastle-under-Lyme Burgesses' Lands Act 1967	1967 c. ix	10 May 1967
An Act to confer further powers upon the Trustees of the Newcastle-under-Lyme Burgesses' Lands; to amend the Newcastle-under-Lyme Burgesses' Lands Act, 1859; (Note: Newcastle-under-Lyme Burgesses' Lands Act 1859 (22 & 23 Vict. c. ciii)) and for other purposes.
East Kilbride Burgh Act 1967	1967 c. x	10 May 1967
An Act to make provision for the constitution of the burgh of East Kilbride in the County of Lanark into a large burgh and for other purposes.
Saint Barnabas, Lewisham, Act 1967	1967 c. xi	28 June 1967
An Act to provide for the disposition of the church of Saint Barnabas, Lewisham, and the use for other purposes thereof; and for purposes incidental thereto.
Wallasey Corporation Act 1967	1967 c. xii	28 June 1967
An Act to authorise the mayor, aldermen and burgesses of the borough of Wallasey to abandon and remove the New Brighton Promenade Pier in the county borough of Wallasey; to make further provision for the collection and recovery of the water rates of the Wirral Water Board; and for other purposes.
Greater London Council (Money) Act 1967	1967 c. xiii	28 June 1967
An Act to regulate the expenditure on capital account and on lending to other persons by the Greater London Council during the financial period from 1st April 1967 to 30th September 1968; and for other purposes.
Saint Stephen, South Lambeth Act 1967	1967 c. xiv	28 June 1967
An Act to provide for the demolition of the church of Saint Stephen, South Lambeth and for the erection of a new church and other buildings; to authorise the use for other purposes of part of the site of the present church; and for purposes incidental thereto.
Churches and Universities (Scotland) Widows' and Orphans' Fund (Amendment) Order Confirmation Act 1967	1967 c. xv	14 July 1967
An Act to confirm a Provisional Order under the Private Legislation Procedure (Scotland) Act 1936, relating to the Churches and Universities (Scotland) Widows' and Orphans' Fund (Amendment).
	Churches and Universities (Scotland) Widows' and Orphans' Fund (Amendment) Order 1967 Provisional Order to amend the provisions of the Churches and Universities (Scotland) Widows' and Orphans' Fund Order, 1954, in their application to certain professors and for other purposes.	
Pittenweem Harbour Order Confirmation Act 1967	1967 c. xvi	14 July 1967
An Act to confirm a Provisional Order under the Private Legislation Procedure (Scotland) Act 1936, relating to Pittenweem Harbour.
	Pittenweem Harbour Order 1967 Provisional Order to authorise the provost, magistrates and town councillors of the Royal Burgh of Pittenweem to carry out works for the improvement of the harbour of Pittenweem and to borrow money; and for other purposes.	
Royal Bank of Scotland Order Confirmation Act 1967 (repealed)	1967 c. xvii	14 July 1967
An Act to confirm a Provisional Order under the Private Legislation Procedure (Scotland) Act 1936, relating to the Royal Bank of Scotland. (Repealed by Royal Bank of Scotland Order Confirmation Act 1970 (c. iii))
	Royal Bank of Scotland Order 1967 Provisional Order to authorise the Royal Bank of Scotland to appoint executive directors, to amend the Royal Charters and Acts of Parliament relating to the Bank; and for other purposes.	
St. Andrews Links Order Confirmation Act 1967 (repealed)	1967 c. xviii	14 July 1967
An Act to confirm a Provisional Order under the Private Legislation Procedure (Scotland) Act 1936, relating to St. Andrews Links. (Repealed by St. Andrews Links Order Confirmation Act 1974 (c. iii))
	St. Andrews Links Order 1967 Provisional Order to amend the provisions of the St. Andrews Links Order, 1932, relative to the powers to close the golf courses on special occasions and to make charges for admission to the said courses and for other purposes.	
Brunel University Act 1967	1967 c. xix	14 July 1967
An Act to dissolve the Brunel College of Advanced Technology; to transfer all the rights, property and liabilities of that college to the Brunel University; and for other purposes.
Greater London Council (General Powers) Act 1967	1967 c. xx	14 July 1967
An Act to confer further powers upon the Greater London Council and other authorities; and for other purposes.
The City University Act 1967	1967 c. xxi	14 July 1967
An Act to dissolve the Northampton College of Advanced Technology, London, and to transfer all the rights, property and liabilities of that college to The City University; to provide for the pooling of investments and moneys of certain endowment funds of The City University; and for other purposes.
University of Aston in Birmingham Act 1967	1967 c. xxii	14 July 1967
An Act to dissolve the College of Advanced Technology, Birmingham and to transfer all the rights, property and liabilities of that college to the University of Aston in Birmingham; to provide for the pooling of investments and moneys of certain endowment funds of the University; and for other purposes.
Ministry of Housing and Local Government Provisional Orders Confirmation (Buxton, Stockport and York) Act 1967	1967 c. xxiii	21 July 1967
An Act to confirm Provisional Orders of the Minister of Housing and Local Government relating to the borough of Buxton, the county borough of Stockport and the city of York.
	Buxton Order 1967 Provisional Order amending a Local Act. (Note: Buxton Urban District Council Act 1904 (4 Edw. 7. c. ccxxiv))	
	Stockport Order 1967 Provisional Order amending a Local Act (Note: Stockport Improvement Act 1847 (10 & 11 Vict. c. cclxxxiv)) and a Confirming Act. (Note: Local Government Board's Provisional Orders Confirmation (No. 10) Act 1886 (50 Vict. c. xvi))	
	York Order 1967 Provisional Order altering a Local Act (Note: York Extension and Improvement Act 1884 (47 & 48 Vict. c. ccxxxii)) and Confirming Acts.	
Ministry of Housing and Local Government Provisional Order Confirmation (West Hertfordshire Main Drainage District) Act 1967	1967 c. xxiv	21 July 1967
An Act to confirm a Provisional Order of the Minister of Housing and Local Government relating to the West Hertfordshire Main Drainage District.
	West Hertfordshire Main Drainage Order 1967 Provisional Order amending a Local Act. (Note: Hertfordshire County Council (Colne Valley Sewerage, &c.) Act 1937 (1 Edw. 8 & 1 Geo. 6. c. lxxxix))	
Metropolitan Water Board Act 1967	1967 c. xxv	21 July 1967
An Act to empower the Metropolitan Water Board to construct works and to acquire lands; and for other purposes.
University of Bradford Act 1967	1967 c. xxvi	21 July 1967
An Act to dissolve the Bradford Institute of Technology and to transfer all rights, property and liabilities of that institute to The University of Bradford; to provide for the pooling of investments and moneys of certain endowment funds of The University of Bradford; and for other purposes.
Newquay Urban District Council Act 1967	1967 c. xxvii	21 July 1967
An Act to confer further powers on the urban district council of Newquay, to make further provision for the improvement, health, local government and finances of the district; and for other purposes.
Guildford Corporation Act 1967	1967 c. xxviii	21 July 1967
An Act to confer further powers upon the mayor, aldermen and burgesses of the borough of Guildford; to make further provision with respect to the health, local government and improvement of the borough; to provide for the transfer of the Godalming Navigation to the National Trust for Places of Historic Interest or Natural Beauty; and for other purposes.
Ministry of Housing and Local Government Provisional Order Confirmation (Greater London Parks and Open Spaces) Act 1967	1967 c. xxix	27 July 1967
An Act to confirm a Provisional Order of the Minister of Housing and Local Government relating to Greater London parks and open spaces.
	Greater London Parks and Open Spaces Order 1967 Provisional Order for securing uniformity in the law applicable with respect to Parks and Open Spaces.	
British Railways Act 1967	1967 c. xxx	27 July 1967
An Act to empower the British Railways Board to construct works and to acquire lands; to extend the time for the completion of certain works; to confer further powers on the Board, the Fishguard and Rosslare Railways and Harbours Company and British Rail Hovercraft Limited; and for other purposes.
British Transport Docks Act 1967	1967 c. xxxi	27 July 1967
An Act to empower the British Transport Docks Board to construct works and to acquire lands; to confer further powers on the Board; and for other purposes.
Port of London Act 1967 (repealed)	1967 c. xxxii	27 July 1967
An Act to amend the Port of London Acts, 1920 to 1965; and for other purposes. (Repealed by Port of London Act 1968 (c. xxxii))
Kingston upon Hull Corporation Act 1967	1967 c. xxxiii	27 July 1967
An Act to empower the lord mayor, aldermen and citizens of the city and county of Kingston upon Hull to construct bridges across the river Hull and other works in the city; to make further provision in reference to lands and the improvement, health, local government and finances of the city; and for other purposes.
Rhymney Valley Sewerage Board Act 1967	1967 c. xxxiv	27 July 1967
An Act to confer further powers upon the Rhymney Valley Sewerage Board; to amend the provisions of the local enactments relating to the Board's undertaking; and for other purposes.
Somerset County Council Act 1967	1967 c. xxxv	27 July 1967
An Act to confer further powers on the Somerset County Council and on local, highway and other authorities in the administrative county of Somerset in relation to lands and highways and the local government, improvement, health and finances of the county; and for other purposes.
Portsmouth Corporation Act 1967	1967 c. xxxvi	27 July 1967
An Act to confer further powers on the lord mayor, aldermen and citizens of the city of Portsmouth in relation to lands, buildings and streets, and to make further provision for the improvement, health, local government and finances of the city; and for other purposes.
Dartford Tunnel Act 1967 (repealed)	1967 c. xxxvii	27 July 1967
An Act to authorise the construction of a further tunnel under the river Thames between West Thurrock in the county of Essex and Dartford in the county of Kent with approaches thereto; to consolidate with amendments the Dartford Tunnel Acts, 1930 to 1962; to confer further powers in connection with the works authorised by those Acts and the new works; and for other purposes. (Repealed by Dartford Tunnel Act 1984 (c. xvii))
Essex County Council (Canvey Island Approaches, etc.) Act 1967	1967 c. xxxviii	27 July 1967
An Act to empower the county council of Essex to construct a new approach road to Canvey Island, including a bridge across East Haven Creek, and a diversion of the existing approach road to Canvey Island, including a bridge across Benfleet Creek, and to purchase lands compulsorily for those and other purposes; to provide for the removal of the existing bridge across Benfleet Creek; to confer further powers on the said county council and on local authorities in the county of Essex in relation to highways and the local government, improvement and health of the county; and for other purposes.
London Transport Act 1967	1967 c. xxxix	27 July 1967
An Act to empower the London Transport Board to construct works and to acquire lands; to extend the time for the compulsory purchase of certain lands; to confer further powers on the Board; and for other purposes.
Manchester Corporation Act 1967	1967 c. xl	27 July 1967
An Act to confer further powers on the lord mayor, aldermen and citizens of the city of Manchester in relation to lands, water, highways, public health, local government, finance and pensions; and for other purposes.
Forth Harbour Reorganisation Scheme Confirmation (Special Procedure) Act 1967	1967 c. xli	6 December 1967
An Act to confirm in accordance with the Statutory Orders (Special Procedure) Acts 1945 (Note: Statutory Orders (Special Procedure) Act 1945 (9 & 10 Geo. 6. c. 18)) and 1965 (Note: Statutory Orders (Special Procedure) Act 1965 (c. 43)) a Scheme under the Harbours Act 1964, (Note: Harbours Act 1964 (c. 40)) relating to the reorganisation of a group of harbours on the estuary of the River Forth.
	Forth Harbour Reorganisation Scheme 1966 (Note: Although passed in 1967, the short title is specified as the Forth Harbour Reorganisation Scheme 1966.)	
City of London (Various Powers) Act 1967	1967 c. xlii	20 December 1967
An Act to confer further powers on the Corporation of London in relation to walkways, to make provision for the appointment of additional judges of the Central Criminal Court, to establish an educational trust fund, to make further provision relating to lands forming part of Epping Forest, and for other purposes.

== See also ==
- List of acts of the Parliament of the United Kingdom
