= Road Traffic Regulation Act 1967 =

Act of the Parliament of the United Kingdom

Road Traffic Regulation Act 1967 (Note: Section 113(1).)
- Act of Parliament
- Parliament of the United Kingdom
- Long title: An Act to consolidate certain enactments relating to road traffic, with corrections and improvements made under the Consolidation of Enactments (Procedure) Act 1949.
- Citation: 1967 c. 76
- Territorial extent: England and Wales; Scotland; (Note: Section 113(3).)

Dates
- Royal assent: 27 July 1967
- Commencement: 27 July 1967 (Note: The Acts of Parliament (Commencement) Act 1793.)
- Repealed: 22 July 2004

Other legislation
- Amends: See § Repealed enactments
- Repeals/revokes: See § Repealed enactments
- Amended by: Police (Scotland) Act 1967; Criminal Justice Act 1972; Statute Law (Repeals) Act 1975; Statute Law (Repeals) Act 1976; Forgery and Counterfeiting Act 1981; Acquisition of Land Act 1981; Road Traffic Regulation Act 1984; Statute Law (Repeals) Act 1993
- Repealed by: Statute Law (Repeals) Act 2004

Status: Repealed

Text of statute as originally enacted

The Road Traffic Regulation Act 1967 (c. 76) was an act of the Parliament of the United Kingdom that consolidated enactments relating to road traffic in Great Britain.

== Provisions ==
=== Repealed enactments ===
Section 110(1) of the act repealed 6 enactments and revoked 3 instruments, listed in parts I and II of schedule 7 to the act, respectively.

Part I – Enactments repealed
Citation	Short title	Extent of repeal
8 & 9 Eliz. 2. c. 16	Road Traffic Act 1960	Sections 19 to 29. Sections 34 to 63. Sections 81 to 96. Section 222. In section 232(1)(a), the words "subsection (5) of section forty-one" and the words from "or" to the end of the paragraph, and in section 232(2)(a) the words from "or", where secondly occurring, to "question". Section 233(1)(h). In section 239, the words "thirty-four, forty-eight, forty-nine". In section 247(1), the words from "subsection (5)" to "eighty-one" and from "or offences" to "thirty-four", and in section 247(2), the words "subsection (2) of section forty-eight, subsection (6) of section forty-nine" and "section eighty-eight". In section 249(1), the words "or section 10 of the London Government Act 1963". In section 250(1)(a), the words from "except" to "ninety-one", and section 250(4). Section 251. In section 257(1), the definition of "classified road" and, in the definition of "driver", the words "and eighty-eight". In section 259(1), the words from "to twenty-nine" to "thirty-eight" and, in section 259(6), the words from "twenty-six" to "and". In section 260(3) and (4), the words "twenty-four or". Schedules 1, 4, 5, 6, 7 and 10. In Schedule 17, the entry relating to the Civil Defence Act 1939 and, in the entry relating to the Local Government (Scotland) Act 1947, the words "81(13), 83(9) and". In Schedule 19, paragraphs 12, 13 and 14. In Schedule 20, in paragraph 5, the words "forty-one and" and the word "each".
8 & 9 Eliz. 2. c. 63	Road Traffic and Roads Improvement Act 1960	Sections 1 to 8. Sections 11 to 16. Section 23(1) except the definition of "the Minister" and "road" and section 23(2). Section 25(2). The Schedule except so far as it amends section 158 of the Road Traffic Act 1960.
10 & 11 Eliz. 2. c. 59	Road Traffic Act 1962	Sections 10 to 13. Section 26. Sections 28 to 33. Section 34 except subsections (2) and (6). In section 35, the words from "under section" to "Act or" and the words from "otherwise" to "Act". In section 38 the words "the Road Traffic and Roads Improvement Act 1960". In section 50(1) the words from "and any" to the end. In Part II of Schedule 1, in paragraphs 15, 16, 17 and 18, the entry in the second column. In Part III of Schedule 1, paragraphs 28 to 32 and paragraph 54. Schedule 2. In Part I of Schedule 4, the entries relating to sections 22, 27, 36, 48, 52, 81 and 88 of the Road Traffic Act 1960, in the entry relating to section 233 of that Act, the words from "(h)" to the end and in the entry relating to section 259 of that Act, the words from "and the" to the end. Part II of Schedule 4, so far as it amends the Road Traffic and Roads Improvement Act 1960.
1963 c. 33	London Government Act 1963	In section 9(2), the words from "and the Minister" to the end, section 9(3) and, in section 9(6), the words "85(1) and (8)". Sections 10 to 13. Section 14(1)(b) and (c), section 14(5) and section 14(6)(b). In Part I of Schedule 5, paragraphs 2 to 12, 17 to 23, 30, 31, 33 and 35. In Part II of Schedule 5, paragraphs 1 to 5. Part III of Schedule 5.
1964 c. 45	Road Traffic Act 1964	The whole act.
1967 c. 21	Road Traffic Act 1967	The whole act.

Part II – Regulations and order revoked
Citation	Title	Extent of revocation
SI 1963/204	Motor Vehicles (Variation of Speed Limit) Regulations 1962	The whole of the regulations.
SI 1965/319	Secretary of State for Wales and Minister of Land and Natural Resources Order 1965	In Schedule 1, in Part I, the entry relating to section 91(2) of the Road Traffic Act 1960 and in Schedule 2, in Part I, the entries relating to sections 20 to 22, 26 to 29, 36 to 38, 40, 41, 43, 44 to 46, 48 to 52, 56 to 59, 63, 81, 85 to 92 and 222 of, and Schedules 6 and 10 to, the Road Traffic Act 1960, all the entries relating to the Road Traffic and Roads Improvement Act 1960, the entries relating to sections 11, 13, 28 and 32 of the Road Traffic Act 1962 and the entry relating to the Road Traffic Act 1964.
SI 1966/981	Motor Vehicles (Variation of Speed Limit) (Amendment) Regulations 1966	The whole of the regulations.

== Subsequent developments ==
The whole act, except sections 109–113 and schedule 6, was repealed by section 146(b) of, and schedule 14 to, the Road Traffic Regulation Act 1984, which came into force on 26 September 1984.

The whole act was repealed by section 1(1) of, and part 14 of schedule 1 to, the Statute Law (Repeals) Act 2004, which came into force on 22 July 2004.
