= List of acts of the Parliament of the United Kingdom from 1951 =

This is a complete list of acts of the Parliament of the United Kingdom for the year 1951.

Note that the first parliament of the United Kingdom was held in 1801; parliaments between 1707 and 1800 were either parliaments of Great Britain or of Ireland. For acts passed up until 1707, see the list of acts of the Parliament of England and the list of acts of the Parliament of Scotland. For acts passed from 1707 to 1800, see the list of acts of the Parliament of Great Britain. See also the list of acts of the Parliament of Ireland.

For acts of the devolved parliaments and assemblies in the United Kingdom, see the list of acts of the Scottish Parliament, the list of acts of the Northern Ireland Assembly, and the list of acts and measures of Senedd Cymru; see also the list of acts of the Parliament of Northern Ireland.

The number shown after each act's title is its chapter number. Acts passed before 1963 are cited using this number, preceded by the year(s) of the reign during which the relevant parliamentary session was held; thus the Union with Ireland Act 1800 is cited as "39 & 40 Geo. 3 c. 67", meaning the 67th act passed during the session that started in the 39th year of the reign of George III and which finished in the 40th year of that reign. Note that the modern convention is to use Arabic numerals in citations (thus "41 Geo. 3" rather than "41 Geo. III"). Acts of the last session of the Parliament of Great Britain and the first session of the Parliament of the United Kingdom are both cited as "41 Geo. 3". Acts passed from 1963 onwards are simply cited by calendar year and chapter number.

== 14 & 15 Geo. 6 ==
Continuing the second session of the 39th Parliament of the United Kingdom, which met from 31 October 1950 until 4 October 1951.

This session was also traditionally cited as 14 & 15 G. 6.

=== Public general acts ===
Short title	Citation	Royal assent
Long title
Consolidated Fund Act 1951 (repealed)	14 & 15 Geo. 6. c. 12	15 February 1951
An Act to apply a sum out of the Consolidated Fund to the service of the year ending on the thirty-first day of March, one thousand nine hundred and fifty-one. (Repealed by Statute Law Revision Act 1964 (c. 79))
Penicillin (Merchant Ships) Act 1951 (repealed)	14 & 15 Geo. 6. c. 13	15 February 1951
An Act to amend the Penicillin Act, 1947, (Note: Penicillin Act 1947 (10 & 11 Geo. 6. c. 29)) for the purpose of enabling penicillin and certain other substances and preparations to be sold or supplied to and administered on board merchant ships. (Repealed by Therapeutic Substances Act 1956 (4 & 5 Eliz. 2. c. 25))
Festival of Britain (Sunday Opening) Act 1951 (repealed)	14 & 15 Geo. 6. c. 14	15 February 1951
An Act to legalize, or remove doubts about the legality of, the opening on Sunday of certain places of public resort to be provided as part of the Festival of Britain, 1951. (Repealed by Statute Law Revision Act 1964 (c. 79))
Local Government (Scotland) Act 1951 (repealed)	14 & 15 Geo. 6. c. 15	15 February 1951
An Act to make provision for increasing the amount which may not be exceeded by town councils in Scotland in respect of certain expenditure; for raising the limit on special district rates leviable by county councils in Scotland for certain purposes; and to restrict the power of county councils and town councils in Scotland to borrow money for certain purposes. (Repealed by Local Government (Scotland) Act 1973 (c. 65))
Consolidated Fund (No. 2) Act 1951 (repealed)	14 & 15 Geo. 6. c. 16	21 March 1951
An Act to apply certain sums out of the Consolidated Fund to the service of the years ending on the thirty-first day of March, one thousand nine hundred and fifty-one and one thousand nine hundred and fifty-two. (Repealed by Statute Law Revision Act 1964 (c. 79))
Export Guarantees Act 1951 (repealed)	14 & 15 Geo. 6. c. 17	21 March 1951
An Act to provide that any power which is or was conferred on the Board of Trade by the Export Guarantees Act, 1949, (Note: Export Guarantees Act 1949 (12, 13 & 14 Geo. 6. c. 14)) or by the Export Guarantees Acts, 1939 to 1948, to give guarantees to or for the benefit of a person shall be taken to extend and have extended to the giving to him of certain similar undertakings in relation to the business of any company controlled by him, and to the giving of guarantees and undertakings to or for the benefit of any such company. (Repealed by Export Guarantees Act 1968 (c. 26))
Livestock Rearing Act 1951	14 & 15 Geo. 6. c. 18	21 March 1951
An Act to extend and amend the provisions of the Hill Farming Act, 1946, (Note: Hill Farming Act 1946 (9 & 10 Geo. 6. c. 73)) relating to the rehabilitation of hill farming land, the payment of subsidies in respect of hill sheep and hill cattle and the control of rams in England and Wales; to make fresh provision with respect to the exercise of the functions under that Act of the Minister of Agriculture and Fisheries and the Secretary of State; and for purposes connected with the matters aforesaid.
Town and Country Planning (Amendment) Act 1951 (repealed)	14 & 15 Geo. 6. c. 19	21 March 1951
An Act to bring certain works for making good war damage within the definition of development in the Town and Country Planning Act, 1947, (Note: Town and Country Planning Act 1947 (10 & 11 Geo. 6. c. 51)) and the Town and Country Planning (Scotland) Act, 1947, (Note: Town and Country Planning (Scotland) Act 1947 (10 & 11 Geo. 6. c. 53)) and within the Third Schedule to each of those Acts; and to extend the period limited by section twenty-three of the first-mentioned Act for serving notices thereunder for the enforcement of conditions subject to which planning permission has been granted. (Repealed for England and Wales by Town and Country Planning Act 1962 (10 & 11 Eliz. 2. c. 38) and for Scotland by Town and Country Planning (Scotland) Act 1972 (c. 52))
Overseas Resources Development Act 1951 (repealed)	14 & 15 Geo. 6. c. 20	21 March 1951
An Act to transfer to the Secretary of State responsibility for the Overseas Food Corporation; to amend the law regulating the functions, constitution and finances of that Corporation; to transfer to the Minister of Food certain rights of that Corporation in relation to the Queensland-British Food Corporation; and for purposes connected with the matters aforesaid. (Repealed by Overseas Resources Development Act 1959 (7 & 8 Eliz. 2. c. 23))
Alkali, &c., Works Regulation (Scotland) Act 1951 (repealed)	14 & 15 Geo. 6. c. 21	21 March 1951
An Act to authorise the making of orders extending or amending the provisions of the Alkali, &c., Works Regulation Act, 1906, (Note: Alkali, &c. Works Regulation Act 1906 (6 Edw. 7. c. 14)) in their application to Scotland; and to make provision for authorising inspectors under that Act in Scotland to inspect any works which are of a character likely to cause the evolution of noxious or offensive gases. (Repealed by Clean Air Enactments (Repeals and Modifications) Regulations 1974 (SI 1974/2170))
Workmen's Compensation (Supplementation) Act 1951 (repealed)	14 & 15 Geo. 6. c. 22	21 March 1951
An Act to provide for the payment of allowances out of the Industrial Injuries Fund with a view to supplementing workmen's compensation where the accident happened before nineteen twenty-four, and for purposes connected therewith. (Repealed by Industrial Injuries and Diseases (Old Cases) Act 1967 (c. 34))
Reserve and Auxiliary Forces (Training) Act 1951 (repealed)	14 & 15 Geo. 6. c. 23	21 March 1951
An Act to make temporary provision for the calling up of certain members of His Majesty's military and air forces for the purposes of training, and in connection therewith to provide for the punishment of incitement to dereliction of duty; to extend the provisions of Part II of the National Service Act, 1948; (Note: National Service Act 1948 (11 & 12 Geo. 6. c. 64)) to make provision as to the liabilities of persons released from service for the purpose of again joining any of the armed forces of the Crown; and for purposes connected with the matters aforesaid. (Repealed by Statute Law (Repeals) Act 1976 (c. 16))
Army and Air Force (Annual) Act 1951 (repealed)	14 & 15 Geo. 6. c. 24	26 April 1951
An Act to provide, during twelve months, for the discipline and regulation of the Army and the Air Force. (Repealed by Revision of the Army and Air Force Acts (Transitional Provisions) Act 1955 (3 & 4 Eliz. 2. c. 20))
Supplies and Services (Defence Purposes) Act 1951 (repealed)	14 & 15 Geo. 6. c. 25	26 April 1951
An Act to extend, for defence purposes and purposes relating to world peace and security, the Supplies and Services (Transitional Powers) Act, 1945, (Note: Supplies and Services (Transitional Powers) Act 1945 (9 & 10 Geo. 6. c. 10)) and Defence Regulations and other instruments having effect by virtue of that Act; and to make provision for the stopping up or diversion of highways for such purposes and for matters incidental thereto. (Repealed by Statute Law (Repeals) Act 1978 (c. 45))
Salmon and Freshwater Fisheries (Protection) (Scotland) Act 1951 (repealed)	14 & 15 Geo. 6. c. 26	10 May 1951
An Act to amend the law in regard to the protection of salmon and freshwater fish in Scotland, including the whole of the River Tweed, and for purposes connected therewith. (Repealed by Salmon and Freshwater Fisheries (Consolidation) (Scotland) Act 2003 (asp 15))
Fire Services Act 1951 (repealed)	14 & 15 Geo. 6. c. 27	10 May 1951
An Act to amend sections twenty-six and twenty-seven of the Fire Services Act, 1947. (Note: Fire Services Act 1947 (10 & 11 Geo. 6. c. 41)) (Repealed by Fire and Rescue Services Act 2004 (c. 21))
Long Leases (Temporary Provisions) (Scotland) Act 1951 (repealed)	14 & 15 Geo. 6. c. 28	10 May 1951
An Act to make temporary provision for the protection of occupiers of residential property in Scotland under leases of not less than thirty-one years. (Repealed by Statute Law (Repeals) Act 1975 (c. 10))
Reverend J. G. MacManaway's Indemnity Act 1951 (repealed)	14 & 15 Geo. 6. c. 29	10 May 1951
An Act to indemnify the Reverend James Godfrey MacManaway from any penal consequences incurred under the House of Commons (Clergy Disqualification) Act, 1801, (Note: House of Commons (Clergy Disqualification) Act 1801 (41 Geo. 3. (U.K.) c. 63)) by sitting or voting as a member of the Commons House of the Parliament of the United Kingdom or as a member of the House of Commons of Northern Ireland. (Repealed by Statute Law Revision Act 1953 (2 & 3 Eliz. 2. c. 5))
Sea Fish Industry Act 1951	14 & 15 Geo. 6. c. 30	10 May 1951
An Act to make provision for the reorganization, development and regulation of the white fish industry; to amend the law relating to fishery harbours, the catching and landing of sea fish and other matters affecting or connected with the sea fishing and whaling industries; to abolish the Scottish Fisheries Advisory Council; and for purposes connected therewith.
National Health Service Act 1951 (repealed)	14 & 15 Geo. 6. c. 31	10 May 1951
An Act to authorise the making and recovery of charges in respect of certain dental and optical appliances under the National Health Service Act, 1946, (Note: National Health Service Act 1946 (9 & 10 Geo. 6. c. 81)) and the National Health Service (Scotland) Act, 1947; (Note: National Health Service (Scotland) Act 1947 (10 & 11 Geo. 6. c. 27)) to make provision for the accommodation and treatment outside Great Britain of persons suffering from respiratory tuberculosis; to remit stamp duty on receipts given in respect of such charges as aforesaid; and to amend the National Assistance Act, 1948, (Note: National Assistance Act 1948 (11 & 12 Geo. 6. c. 29)) in relation to requirements for services under the said Acts of 1946 and 1947. (Repealed for England and Wales by National Health Service Act 1977 (c. 49) and for Scotland by National Health Service (Scotland) Act 1978 (c. 29))
British North America Act 1951	14 & 15 Geo. 6. c. 32	31 May 1951
An Act to amend the British North America Act, 1867. (Note: British North America Act 1867 (30 & 31 Vict. c. 3))
Fraudulent Mediums Act 1951 (repealed)	14 & 15 Geo. 6. c. 33	22 June 1951
An Act to repeal the Witchcraft Act, 1735, (Note: Witchcraft Act 1735 (9 Geo. 2. c. 5)) and to make, in substitution for certain provisions of section four of the Vagrancy Act, 1824, (Note: Vagrancy Act 1824 (5 Geo. 4. c. 83)) express provision for the punishment of persons who fraudulently purport to act as spiritualistic mediums or to exercise powers of telepathy, clairvoyance or other similar powers. (Repealed by Consumer Protection from Unfair Trading Regulations 2008 (SI 2008/1277))
National Insurance Act 1951 (repealed)	14 & 15 Geo. 6. c. 34	22 June 1951
An Act to provide for reducing the payments out of moneys provided by Parliament into the National Insurance Fund; for increasing the rate of widowed mothers' allowances under the National Insurance Act, 1946, (Note: National Insurance Act 1946 (9 & 10 Geo. 6. c. 67)) and of retirement pensions under the said Act; for increasing benefits under the National Insurance Acts, 1946 to 1949, in respect of children; for increasing the amounts by which retirement pensions under the National Insurance Act, 1946, may be increased by the payment of contributions after pensionable age, for reducing the extent to which deductions from widows' benefits and retirement pensions under the said Act are to be made in respect of earnings, for relaxing the conditions for an increase of sickness benefit or a retirement pension under the said Act in respect of a wife engaged in gainful occupation, and for modifying the provisions of the said Act under which persons are treated as having retired; and for purposes connected with the matters aforesaid. (Repealed by Statute Law Revision (Consequential Repeals) Act 1965 (c. 55))
Pet Animals Act 1951	14 & 15 Geo. 6. c. 35	22 June 1951
An Act to regulate the sale of pet animals. (Repealed for Scotland by Animal Health and Welfare (Scotland) Act 2006 (asp 11))
Criminal Law Amendment Act 1951 (repealed)	14 & 15 Geo. 6. c. 36	22 June 1951
An Act to repeal the words in paragraphs (1) and (4) of section two and paragraph (2) of section three of the Criminal Law Amendment Act, 1885, (Note: Criminal Law Amendment Act 1885 (48 & 49 Vict. c. 69)) which restrict the operation of those paragraphs in the case of a woman or girl who is a common prostitute or of known immoral character or whose usual place of abode is a brothel. (Repealed for England and Wales by Sexual Offences Act 1956 (4 & 5 Eliz. 2. c. 69) and for Scotland by Statute Law (Repeals) Act 1974 (c. 22))
Telegraph Act 1951 (repealed)	14 & 15 Geo. 6. c. 37	22 June 1951
An Act to increase the maximum rate for ordinary written telegrams. (Repealed by Telegraph Act 1954 (2 & 3 Eliz. 2. c. 28))
Leasehold Property (Temporary Provisions) Act 1951 (repealed)	14 & 15 Geo. 6. c. 38	22 June 1951
An Act to make temporary provision for the protection of occupiers of residential property against the coming to an end of long leases, and for the renewal of tenancies of shops; and for purposes connected with the matters aforesaid. (Repealed by Statute Law (Repeals) Act 1975 (c. 10))
Common Informers Act 1951	14 & 15 Geo. 6. c. 39	22 June 1951
An Act to abolish the common informer procedure.
New Streets Act 1951 (repealed)	14 & 15 Geo. 6. c. 40	3 July 1951
An Act to secure the satisfactory construction, lighting, sewerage, furnishing and completion of streets adjacent to new buildings, and to oblige and empower local authorities to adopt such streets. (Repealed by Highways Act 1959 (7 & 8 Eliz. 2. c. 25))
Coal Industry Act 1951 (repealed)	14 & 15 Geo. 6. c. 41	3 July 1951
An Act to extend the power of the Minister of Fuel and Power to make advances to the National Coal Board for capital purposes and to extend the temporary borrowing powers of that Board; and to adjust as between the Cannock Chase and South Staffordshire Valuation Districts the amount of compensation apportioned by the Central Valuation Board to those districts under section twelve of the Coal Industry Nationalisation Act, 1946. (Note: Coal Industry Nationalisation Act 1946 (9 & 10 Geo. 6. c. 59)) (Repealed by Statute Law (Repeals) Act 1973 (c. 39))
Ministry of Materials Act 1951 (repealed)	14 & 15 Geo. 6. c. 42	3 July 1951
An Act to make provision for the appointment and functions of a Minister of Materials. (Repealed by Transfer of Functions (Ministry of Materials) Order 1954 (SI 1954/1028))
Finance Act 1951	14 & 15 Geo. 6. c. 43	1 August 1951
An Act to grant certain duties, to alter other duties, and to amend the law with respect to the National Debt (including the Sinking Funds therefor), Customs and Inland Revenue (including Excise).
Appropriation Act 1951 (repealed)	14 & 15 Geo. 6. c. 44	1 August 1951
An Act to apply a sum out of the Consolidated Fund to the service of the year ending on the thirty-first day of March, one thousand nine hundred and fifty-two and to appropriate the supplies granted in this Session of Parliament. (Repealed by Statute Law Revision Act 1964 (c. 79))
Rural Water Supplies and Sewerage Act 1951 (repealed)	14 & 15 Geo. 6. c. 45	1 August 1951
An Act to increase to forty-five million pounds the limit of fifteen million pounds on the contributions out of moneys provided by Parliament which may be made under section one of the Rural Water Supplies and Sewerage Act, 1944. (Note: Rural Water Supplies and Sewerage Act 1944 (7 & 8 Geo. 6. c. 26)) (Repealed by Rural Water Supplies and Sewerage Act 1965 (c. 80))
Courts-Martial (Appeals) Act 1951	14 & 15 Geo. 6. c. 46	1 August 1951
An Act to establish a Courts-Martial Appeal Court and provide for appeals thereto from courts-martial and certain naval disciplinary courts; to make provision with respect to the offices of Judge Advocate of His Majesty's Fleet and Judge Advocate General; and for purposes connected with the matters aforesaid.
Festival of Britain (Additional Loans) Act 1951 (repealed)	14 & 15 Geo. 6. c. 47	1 August 1951
An Act to authorise the making of additional loans to the company formed for the purpose of managing the festival gardens provided in Battersea Park as part of the Festival of Britain, 1951; and for purposes connected therewith. (Repealed by Statute Law (Repeals) Act 1981 (c. 19))
Dangerous Drugs Act 1951 (repealed)	14 & 15 Geo. 6. c. 48	1 August 1951
An Act to consolidate the Dangerous Drugs Acts, 1920 to 1950, and section twenty-eight of the Pharmacy and Poisons Act, 1933. (Note: Pharmacy and Poisons Act 1933 (23 & 24 Geo. 5. c. 25)) (Repealed by Dangerous Drugs Act 1965 (c. 15))
Slaughter of Animals (Amendment) Act 1951 (repealed)	14 & 15 Geo. 6. c. 49	1 August 1951
An Act to extend the provisions of the Slaughter of Animals Act, 1933, (Note: Slaughter of Animals Act 1933 (23 & 24 Geo. 5. c. 39)) and to implement certain recommendations of the departmental committee on the export and slaughter of horses. (Repealed by Slaughter of Animals (Amendment) Act 1954 (2 & 3 Eliz. 2. c. 59))
Consolidated Fund (Civil List Provisions) Act 1951 (repealed)	14 & 15 Geo. 6. c. 50	1 August 1951
An Act to complete the charge on the Consolidated Fund of the provisions made by the Civil List Act, 1937. (Note: Civil List Act 1937 (1 Edw. 8. & 1 Geo. 6. c. 32)) (Repealed by Sovereign Grant Act 2011 (c. 15))
Isle of Man (Customs) Act 1951 (repealed)	14 & 15 Geo. 6. c. 51	1 August 1951
An Act to amend the law with respect to customs in the Isle of Man. (Repealed for the Isle of Man by Customs and Excise etc. Order 1976 (GC No 1/76))
Telephone Act 1951 (repealed)	14 & 15 Geo. 6. c. 52	1 August 1951
An Act to make further provision for enabling the Postmaster General to regulate the use of means of telephonic communication provided by him and the general conduct of telephonic business carried on under his control and to repeal sections seventeen and eighteen of the Telegraph Act, 1868. (Note: Telegraph Act 1868 (31 & 32 Vict. c. 110)) (Repealed by Post Office Act 1969 (c. 48))
Midwives Act 1951 (repealed)	14 & 15 Geo. 6. c. 53	1 August 1951
An Act to consolidate certain enactments relating to midwives. (Repealed by Nurses, Midwives and Health Visitors Act 1979 (c. 36))
Midwives (Scotland) Act 1951 (repealed)	14 & 15 Geo. 6. c. 54	1 August 1951
An Act to consolidate certain enactments relating to midwives in Scotland. (Repealed by Nurses, Midwives and Health Visitors Act 1979 (c. 36))
Nurses (Scotland) Act 1951 (repealed)	14 & 15 Geo. 6. c. 55	1 August 1951
An Act to consolidate certain enactments relating to nurses for the sick in Scotland. (Repealed by Regulation of Care (Scotland) Act 2001 (asp 8))
Guardianship and Maintenance of Infants Act 1951 (repealed)	14 & 15 Geo. 6. c. 56	1 August 1951
An Act to extend jurisdiction under the Guardianship of Infants Acts, 1886 (Note: Guardianship of Infants Act 1886 (49 & 50 Vict. c. 27)) and 1925, (Note: Guardianship of Infants Act 1925 (15 & 16 Geo. 5. c. 45)) to certain county courts and courts of summary jurisdiction; to provide for increasing the sums that may be awarded by courts of summary jurisdiction under the said Acts or under section seven of the Summary Jurisdiction (Married Women) Act, 1895, (Note: Summary Jurisdiction (Married Women) Act 1895 (58 & 59 Vict. c. 39)) towards the maintenance of children, for enabling payments of maintenance under the said section seven to be continued in respect of children over the age of sixteen engaged in a course of education or training, and for requiring certain payments of maintenance in respect of children under the said Acts or under the said section seven to be paid without deduction of income tax; and for purposes connected with the matters aforesaid. (Repealed by Guardianship of Minors Act 1971 (c. 3))
National Assistance (Amendment) Act 1951	14 & 15 Geo. 6. c. 57	1 August 1951
An Act to amend section forty-seven of the National Assistance Act, 1948. (Repealed for Scotland by Adult Support and Protection (Scotland) Act 2007 (asp 10))
Fireworks Act 1951 (repealed)	14 & 15 Geo. 6. c. 58	1 August 1951
An Act to confer powers of seizure where dangerous fireworks are found, and powers to determine or amend licences or certificates for explosives factories where fireworks are made, to make provision for the marking of fireworks and containers in which fireworks are kept and to amend the law relating to licences for small firework factories; and for purposes connected with the matters aforesaid. (Repealed by Explosives Regulations 2014 (SI 2014/1638))
Price Control and other Orders (Indemnity) Act 1951 (repealed)	14 & 15 Geo. 6. c. 59	1 August 1951
An Act to grant an indemnity in respect of there not having been laid before Parliament, with instruments required to be so laid, certain Schedules or other documents by reference to which such instruments operated, and to provide that such instruments shall be deemed to have been duly laid. (Repealed by Statute Law (Repeals) Act 1969 (c. 52))
Mineral Workings Act 1951	14 & 15 Geo. 6. c. 60	1 August 1951
An Act to establish a fund for the purpose of financing the restoration of land in England used for the working of ironstone by opencast operations and to provide for payments to and from that fund; to make provision for the reclamation, cultivation, afforestation or other treatment of such land; to provide for setting off the development charge in respect of certain minerals against payments under Part VI of the Town and Country Planning Act, 1947, or Part V of the Town and Country Planning (Scotland) Act, 1947, in respect of interests therein, for the modification of certain mining leases and orders granting working rights, and for the application of section eighty-one of the Town and Country Planning Act, 1947, and section seventy-eight of the Town and Country Planning (Scotland) Act, 1947, to certain minerals of the National Coal Board; to authorise the temporary stopping up or diversion of highways for the purpose of working minerals by opencast operations; and for purposes connected with the matters aforesaid.
Forestry Act 1951 (repealed)	14 & 15 Geo. 6. c. 61	1 August 1951
An Act to provide for the maintenance of reserves of growing trees in Great Britain and to regulate the felling of trees; to amend the procedure applicable to compulsory purchase orders under the Forestry Act, 1945; (Note: Forestry Act 1945 (8 & 9 Geo. 6. c. 35)) and for purposes connected with the matters aforesaid. (Repealed by Forestry Act 1967 (c. 10))
Tithe Act 1951	14 & 15 Geo. 6. c. 62	1 August 1951
An Act to provide, in lieu of the obligation imposed by the Tithe Act, 1936, (Note: Tithe Act 1936 (26 Geo. 5 & 1 Edw. 8. c. 43)) to register all annuities charged thereby, for registration in selected districts, to amend and to repeal certain provisions of that Act, and to make further provision with respect to certain matters connected therewith.
Rag Flock and Other Filling Materials Act 1951 (repealed)	14 & 15 Geo. 6. c. 63	1 August 1951
An Act to secure the use of clean filling materials in upholstered articles and other articles which are stuffed or lined, and for purposes connected therewith. (Repealed by Deregulation (Rag Flock and Other Filling Materials Act 1951) (Repeal) Order 1996 (SI 1996/3097))
Rivers (Prevention of Pollution) Act 1951	14 & 15 Geo. 6. c. 64	1 August 1951
An Act to make new provision for maintaining or restoring the wholesomeness of the rivers and other inland or coastal waters of England and Wales in place of the Rivers Pollution Prevention Act, 1876, (Note: Rivers Pollution Prevention Act 1876 (39 & 40 Vict. c. 75)) and certain other enactments; and to provide for laying before Parliament the annual reports of river boards.
Reserve and Auxiliary Forces (Protection of Civil Interests) Act 1951	14 & 15 Geo. 6. c. 65	1 August 1951
An Act to provide for protecting the interests of persons called up or volunteering for certain naval, military or air force service, or doing work or training under the National Service Act, 1948, by virtue of being conditionally registered under that Act as conscientious objectors, and of other persons consequentially affected, in respect of civil rights and liabilities of theirs.
Rivers (Prevention of Pollution) (Scotland) Act 1951 (repealed)	14 & 15 Geo. 6. c. 66	1 August 1951
An Act to provide for establishing river purification boards in Scotland and for conferring on or transferring to such boards functions relating to the prevention of river pollution; to make new provision for maintaining or restoring the cleanliness of the rivers and other inland waters and the tidal waters of Scotland in place of the Rivers Pollution Prevention Act, 1876, and certain other enactments; and for purposes connected with the matters aforesaid. (Repealed by Control of Pollution Act 1974 (c. 40), Environment Act 1995 (c. 25) and Water Environment (Consequential and Savings Provisions) (Scotland) Order 2006 (SSI 2006/181))

=== Local acts ===
Short title	Citation	Royal assent
Long title
Island of Arran Piers Order Confirmation Act 1951	14 & 15 Geo. 6. c. vi	15 February 1951
An Act to confirm a Provisional Order under the Private Legislation Procedure (Scotland) Act 1936 (Note: Private Legislation Procedure (Scotland) Act 1936 (26 Geo. 5 & 1 Edw. 8. c. 52)) relating to Arran Piers.
	Island of Arran Piers Order 1951 Provisional Order to authorise the trustees of the Arran and Easton Estates of the late William Alexander Louis Stephen Duke of Hamilton Brandon and Chatelherault to transfer their piers at Brodick Lamlash Loch Ranza and Whiting Bay all in the Island of Arran to Arran Piers Limited to confer powers on the said Company and to make further provision with respect to the maintenance regulation and management of the said piers and the levying of rates tolls and charges in respect thereof and for other purposes.	
Falkirk Burgh Extension, &c. Order Confirmation Act 1951	14 & 15 Geo. 6. c. vii	26 April 1951
An Act to confirm a Provisional Order under the Private Legislation Procedure (Scotland) Act 1936 relating to Falkirk Burgh Extension &c.
	Falkirk Burgh Extension, &c. Order 1951 Provisional Order to extend the boundaries of the burgh of Falkirk to confer further powers on the provost magistrates and councillors of the said burgh with respect to the local government health administration and finance of the said burgh and for other purposes.	
Lloyd's Act 1951	14 & 15 Geo. 6. c. viii	26 April 1951
An Act to confer further powers on Lloyd's to amend Lloyd's Acts 1871 to 1925 and for other purposes.
Oxford Motor Services Act 1951	14 & 15 Geo. 6. c. ix	26 April 1951
An Act to repeal the Oxford and District Tramways Act 1914 (Note: Oxford and District Tramways Act 1914 (4 & 5 Geo. 5. c. clxxiii)) the Oxford Motor Services Act 1921 (Note: Oxford Motor Services Act 1921 (11 & 12 Geo. 5. c. ix)) and certain provisions of the Oxford Extension Act 1928 (Note: Oxford Extension Act 1928 (18 & 19 Geo. 5. c. lxxxiv)) and for other purposes.
City of London (Central Criminal Court) Act 1951 (repealed)	14 & 15 Geo. 6. c. x	26 April 1951
An Act to authorise a contribution out of the general rate of the city of London for the reconstruction of the Central Criminal Court. (Repealed by Statute Law (Repeals) Act 2008 (c. 12))
Aberdeen Chartered Accountants' Widows' Fund Order Confirmation Act 1951	14 & 15 Geo. 6. c. xi	10 May 1951
An Act to confirm a Provisional Order under the Private Legislation Procedure (Scotland) Act 1936 relating to Aberdeen Chartered Accountants' Widows' Fund.
	Aberdeen Chartered Accountants' Widows' Fund Order 1951 Provisional Order to reconstitute the widows' fund of the Society of Chartered Accountants in Aberdeen and for other purposes.	
Edinburgh Chartered Accountants Annuity, &c. Fund Order Confirmation Act 1951	14 & 15 Geo. 6. c. xii	10 May 1951
An Act to confirm a Provisional Order under the Private Legislation Procedure (Scotland) Act 1936 relating to Edinburgh Chartered Accountants Annuity &c. Fund.
	Edinburgh Chartered Accountants Annuity, &c. Fund Order 1951 Provisional Order to reconstitute the Edinburgh Chartered Accountants Annuity &c. Fund and for other purposes.	
Airdrie Corporation Order Confirmation Act 1951	14 & 15 Geo. 6. c. xiii	10 May 1951
An Act to confirm a Provisional Order under the Private Legislation Procedure (Scotland) Act 1936 relating to Airdrie Corporation.
	Airdrie Corporation Order 1951	
University of Edinburgh (Royal (Dick) Veterinary College) Order Confirmation Act 1951	14 & 15 Geo. 6. c. xiv	10 May 1951
An Act to confirm a Provisional Order under the Private Legislation Procedure (Scotland) Act 1936 relating to University of Edinburgh (Royal (Dick) Veterinary College).
	University of Edinburgh (Royal (Dick) Veterinary College) Order 1951	
Humber Conservancy Act 1951 (repealed)	14 & 15 Geo. 6. c. xv	10 May 1951
An Act to confer further powers upon the Humber Conservancy Board with respect to dues and for other purposes. (Repealed by Humber Harbour Reorganisation Scheme 1966 Confirmation Order 1967 (SI 1968/237))
Canterbury Extension Act 1951 (repealed)	14 & 15 Geo. 6. c. xvi	10 May 1951
An Act to extend the boundaries of the city of Canterbury and county of the same city and for purposes incidental thereto. (Repealed by County of Kent Act 1981 (c. xviii))
Baptist and Congregational Trusts Act 1951	14 & 15 Geo. 6. c. xvii	22 June 1951
An Act to authorise the appointment of certain trust corporations as trustees of Baptist and Congregational charities and the declaration adoption and amendment of model trusts and for other purposes.
Royal Albert Hall Act 1951	14 & 15 Geo. 6. c. xviii	22 June 1951
An Act to make better provision for the structural improvement repair and maintenance of the Royal Albert Hall to provide additional capital funds and borrowing powers for the Corporation of the Hall of Arts and Sciences to amend and extend the existing provisions as to seat rates and seatholders and the use and letting of the hall and for other purposes.
London County Council (Money) Act 1951 (repealed)	14 & 15 Geo. 6. c. xix	22 June 1951
An Act to regulate the expenditure on capital account and lending of money by the London County Council during the financial period from the first day of April one thousand nine hundred and fifty-one to the thirtieth day of September one thousand nine hundred and fifty-two and for other purposes. (Repealed by London County Council (Loans) Act 1955 (4 & 5 Eliz. 2. c. xxvi))
Uttoxeter Urban District Council Act 1951 (repealed)	14 & 15 Geo. 6. c. xx	3 July 1951
An Act to empower the urban district council of Uttoxeter to acquire lands to authorise them to continue and maintain a racecourse on part of such lands to alter the statutory provisions applicable to the Council's water undertaking to confer upon the Council further powers for the improvement and good government of their district and for other purposes. (Repealed by Staffordshire Act 1983 (c. xviii))
Dee and Clwyd River Board Act 1951	14 & 15 Geo. 6. c. xxi	3 July 1951
An Act to provide for the transfer to the Dee and Clwyd River Board of certain sluices controlling the outfall from Bala Lake in the county of Merioneth and to repeal certain obligations of the British Transport Commission in connection with the use thereof to confer financial powers on the Mid and South East Cheshire Water Board the West Cheshire Water Board and the Wrexham and East Denbighshire Water Company and for other purposes.
Sir William Turner's Hospital at Kirkleatham Charity Scheme Confirmation Act 1951	14 & 15 Geo. 6. c. xxii	1 August 1951
An Act to confirm a Scheme of the Charity Commissioners for the application or management of the Charity known as Sir William Turner's Hospital at Kirkleatham in the north riding of the county of York.
	Scheme for the application or management of the Charity known as Sir William Turner's Hospital at Kirkleatham in the north riding of the county of York regulated by an Act for settling the several charities of the foundation of Sir William Turner knight deceased and the possessions and revenues thereunto belonging passed in the 31st year of the reign of King George 2. cap. 16 (private). (Note: Sir William Turner's Charities Act 1757 (31 Geo. 2. c. 16 Pr.))	
British Transport Commission Order Confirmation Act 1951	14 & 15 Geo. 6. c. xxiii	1 August 1951
An Act to confirm a Provisional Order under the Private Legislation Procedure (Scotland) Act 1936 relating to the British Transport Commission.
	British Transport Commission Order 1951 Provisional Order to empower the British Transport Commission to construct a work and to acquire additional lands to extend the time for the compulsory purchase of certain lands to confer further powers on the Commission and for other purposes.	
Walsall Corporation (Trolley Vehicles) Order Confirmation Act 1951 (repealed)	14 & 15 Geo. 6. c. xxiv	1 August 1951
An Act to confirm a Provisional Order made by the Minister of Transport under the Walsall Corporation Act 1925 (Note: Walsall Corporation Act 1925 (15 & 16 Geo. 5. c. cxxii)) relating to Walsall Corporation trolley vehicles. (Repealed by Walsall Corporation Act 1969 (c. lviii))
	Walsall Corporation (Trolley Vehicles) Order 1951 Provisional Order authorising the mayor aldermen and burgesses of the borough of Walsall to use trolley vehicles upon additional routes in the said borough.	
Pier and Harbour Order (Lymington) Confirmation Act 1951	14 & 15 Geo. 6. c. xxv	1 August 1951
An Act to confirm a Provisional Order made by the Minister of Transport under the General Pier and Harbour Act 1861 (Note: General Pier and Harbour Act 1861 (24 & 25 Vict. c. 45)) relating to Lymington.
	Lymington River and Harbour Order 1951 Provisional Order to incorporate Commissioners of the river and harbour of Lymington to transfer to them the undertaking known as Lymington River and Harbour to authorise them to construct new works to maintain manage and improve the said river and harbour to borrow money for the purposes thereof and otherwise and to levy tolls rates and charges and for other purposes.	
Saint Benet Gracechurch Act 1951	14 & 15 Geo. 6. c. xxvi	1 August 1951
An Act to confer upon the incumbent of the united benefice of Saint Edmund the King and Saint Nicholas Acons with All Hallows Lombard Street Saint Benet Gracechurch Saint Leonard Eastcheap and Saint Dionis Backchurch in the city of London the Union Castle Mail Steamship Company Limited and other persons powers with reference to part of the churchyard appurtenant to the former church of Saint Benet Gracechurch to provide for the extinguishment of rights over or in respect of the said part to empower the said incumbent to sell the lands comprising such part to authorise the erection of buildings on the said lands and for other purposes.
Great Yarmouth Port and Haven Act 1951	14 & 15 Geo. 6. c. xxvii	1 August 1951
An Act to alter the constitution of the Great Yarmouth Port and Haven Commissioners to increase certain tolls leviable by the Commissioners to confer further powers upon the Commissioners and for other purposes.
London County Council (Crystal Palace) Act 1951	14 & 15 Geo. 6. c. xxviii	1 August 1951
An Act to provide for the vesting of the Crystal Palace and park in the London County Council for the dissolution of the Crystal Palace Trustees and for other purposes.
Brighton Extension Act 1951	14 & 15 Geo. 6. c. xxix	1 August 1951
An Act to extend the boundaries of the county borough of Brighton and for purposes incidental thereto.
Abingdon Corporation Act 1951 (repealed)	14 & 15 Geo. 6. c. xxx	1 August 1951
An Act to extend the boundary of the borough of Abingdon to empower the mayor aldermen and burgesses of the borough to acquire and use lands to provide for the extinction of common or commonable rights over Abingdon Common to make provision with regard to fishing in and in the neighbourhood of the borough to provide for the dissolution of a joint committee appointed by the council of the borough and the parish council of the parish of Saint Helen Without to make further provision for the improvement health local government and finances of the borough and for other purposes. (Repealed by Oxfordshire Act 1985 (c. xxxiv))
Nottingham City and County Boundaries Act 1951 (repealed)	14 & 15 Geo. 6. c. xxxi	1 August 1951
An Act to alter the boundaries of the city of Nottingham and county of the same city and the boundaries of the administrative county of Nottingham to make further provision in reference to the areas affected by such alterations and for other purposes. (Repealed by Nottinghamshire County Council Act 1985 (c. xv))
Bristol Corporation Act 1951	14 & 15 Geo. 6. c. xxxii	1 August 1951
An Act to authorise the lord mayor aldermen and burgesses of the city of Bristol to increase the maximum rates dues tolls and charges leviable in respect of their dock undertaking to confer further powers upon them with reference to the superannuation of certain officers servants and others to make further provision for the health improvement local government and finances of the city and for other purposes.
Dartmouth Harbour Act 1951 (repealed)	14 & 15 Geo. 6. c. xxxiii	1 August 1951
An Act to amend the constitution of the Dartmouth Harbour Commissioners to make provision with respect to the rates rents and charges leviable by the Commissioners to confer upon the Commissioners additional powers to consolidate with amendments the statutory powers of the Commissioners and for other purposes. (Repealed by Dart Harbour and Navigation Authority Act 1975 (c. xxii))
Bournemouth and District Water Act 1951	14 & 15 Geo. 6. c. xxxiv	1 August 1951
An Act to change the name of the Bournemouth Gas and Water Company to provide for the redemption of the outstanding debenture stock of the Company for the transfer of British gas three per centum guaranteed stock 1990-95 to the existing stockholders of the Company and for the consolidation of the existing capital to authorise the Company to raise additional capital to increase the quantity of water which the Company may abstract from the river Avon to confer further powers upon the Company and for other purposes.
Lancashire County Council (General Powers) Act 1951	14 & 15 Geo. 6. c. xxxv	1 August 1951
An Act to confer further powers on the county council of the administrative county of the county palatine of Lancaster and on local authorities in relation to the local government improvement and health of the county palatine of Lancaster to make further provision as to the finances of the county and for other purposes.
Sunderland Corporation Act 1951	14 & 15 Geo. 6. c. xxxvi	1 August 1951
An Act to provide for the extension of the periods limited for the compulsory purchase of certain lands by the corporation of Sunderland and the completion of certain works to empower the Corporation to supply heat to extend the powers of the River Wear Commissioners to lease land to the Corporation to make further provision for the improvement health and local government of their borough and for other purposes.
Faversham Navigation Act 1951 (repealed)	14 & 15 Geo. 6. c. xxxvii	1 August 1951
An Act to alter the constitution of the Commissioners of the Faversham Navigation to confer further powers upon the said Commissioners with respect to their finances and with respect to rates tolls duties and charges to enlarge the powers of the said Commissioners and for other purposes. (Repealed by Medway Ports Authority Act 1973 (c. xxi))
Sutton and Cheam Corporation Act 1951	14 & 15 Geo. 6. c. xxxviii	1 August 1951
An Act to vary the terms on which the sewage from certain areas is disposed of by the mayor aldermen and burgesses of the borough of Sutton and Cheam to confer further powers upon them in regard to lands and to make further and better provision for the health local government finance and improvement of the borough of Sutton and Cheam and for other purposes.
British Transport Commission Act 1951	14 & 15 Geo. 6. c. xxxix	1 August 1951
An Act to empower the British Transport Commission to construct works and to acquire lands to revive the powers and extend the time for the construction of certain works to confer further powers on the Commission and for other purposes.
Swindon Corporation Act 1951	14 & 15 Geo. 6. c. xl	1 August 1951
An Act to extend the boundary of the borough of Swindon to make further provision in reference to the supply of water and the improvement health local government and finances of the borough and for other purposes.
London County Council (General Powers) Act 1951	14 & 15 Geo. 6. c. xli	1 August 1951
An Act to confer further powers upon the London County Council and other authorities and for other purposes.
Trent River Board Act 1951	14 & 15 Geo. 6. c. xlii	1 August 1951
An Act to empower the Trent River Board to acquire lands to stop up part of the river Trent and for other purposes.
West Riding (Yorkshire) County Council (General Powers) Act 1951 (repealed)	14 & 15 Geo. 6. c. xliii	1 August 1951
An Act to confer further powers upon the county council of and local and highway authorities in the administrative county of the west riding of Yorkshire and for other purposes. (Repealed by Statute Law (Repeals) Act 1989 (c. 43))
Worcester Corporation Act 1951 (repealed)	14 & 15 Geo. 6. c. xliv	1 August 1951
An Act to extend the boundary of the city of Worcester and of the county of the same city to make further provision for the improvement health local government and finances of the city and for other purposes. (Repealed by Worcester City Council Act 1985 (c. xliii))
Nottinghamshire County Council Act 1951 (repealed)	14 & 15 Geo. 6. c. xlv	1 August 1951
An Act to confer further powers on the Nottinghamshire County Council and local authorities in the county of Nottingham in relation to lands and highways and the local government improvement health and finances of the county to include provisions with respect to massage establishments hairdressers' and barbers' premises and places of entertainment to make further provision for the superannuation of employees to authorise the supply of heat in certain areas in the county and for other purposes. (Repealed by Nottinghamshire County Council Act 1985 (c. xv))
Liverpool Extension Act 1951 (repealed)	14 & 15 Geo. 6. c. xlvi	1 August 1951
An Act to extend the boundaries of the city of Liverpool and for purposes incidental thereto. (Repealed by County of Merseyside Act 1980 (c. x))

=== Sources ===
- The Public General Acts and Church Assembly Measures of 1951. London: Her Majesty's Stationery Office. 1951. pp. 1–655 – via Google Books.
- The Public General Acts and Church Assembly Measures of 1951. London: Her Majesty's Stationery Office. 1951. pp. 1–655 – via Google Books.
- The Journals of the House of Commons (PDF). Vol. 206 (October 1950 – October 1951). pp. 3–332 – via parliament.uk.
- Chronological Table of the Statutes: Covering the Period from 1235 to the End of 1971. London: Her Majesty's Stationery Office. 1972. pp. 1047–1055. ISBN 978-0-11-840096-1 – via Google Books.
- "UK Public General Acts from 1951". legislation.gov.uk. The National Archives.
- "UK Local Acts from 1951". legislation.gov.uk. The National Archives.
- "Chronological Tables of Local Acts: Part 176 (1951-1952)". legislation.gov.uk. The National Archives.

== 15 & 16 Geo. 6 & 1 Eliz. 2 ==
The first session of the 40th Parliament of the United Kingdom, which met from 31 October 1951 until 30 October 1952.

This session was also traditionally cited as 15 & 16 G. 6 & 1 Eliz. 2.

=== Public general acts ===
Short title	Citation	Royal assent
Long title
Consolidated Fund (No. 3) Act 1951 (repealed)	15 & 16 Geo. 6 & 1 Eliz. 2. c. 1	7 December 1951
An Act to apply a sum out of the Consolidated Fund to the service of the year ending on the thirty-first day of March, one thousand nine hundred and fifty-two. (Repealed by Statute Law Revision Act 1964 (c. 79))
Mr. Speaker Clifton Brown's Retirement Act 1951 (repealed)	15 & 16 Geo. 6 & 1 Eliz. 2. c. 2	7 December 1951
An Act to settle and secure an annuity upon the Right Honourable Douglas Clifton Brown in consideration of his eminent services. (Repealed by Statute Law Revision Act 1963 (c. 30))
Expiring Laws Continuance Act 1951 (repealed)	15 & 16 Geo. 6 & 1 Eliz. 2. c. 3	7 December 1951
An Act to continue certain expiring laws. (Repealed by Statute Law Revision Act 1963 (c. 30))
Pneumoconiosis and Byssinosis Benefit Act 1951 (repealed)	15 & 16 Geo. 6 & 1 Eliz. 2. c. 4	7 December 1951
An Act to provide for the payment of benefit out of the Industrial Injuries Fund to or in respect of certain persons who are totally disabled or die or have died after the thirty-first day of December, nineteen hundred and forty-nine from pneumoconiosis or byssinosis, not being or having been insured in respect of those diseases respectively under the National Insurance (Industrial Injuries) Act, 1946, (Note: National Insurance (Industrial Injuries) Act 1946 (9 & 10 Geo. 6. c. 62)) or entitled to workmen's compensation in respect thereof. (Repealed by Industrial Injuries and Diseases (Old Cases) Act 1967 (c. 34))
Public Works Loans Act 1951 (repealed)	15 & 16 Geo. 6 & 1 Eliz. 2. c. 5	7 December 1951
An Act to grant money for the purpose of certain local loans out of the Local Loans Fund. (Repealed by Public Works Loans Act 1964 (c. 9))
Japanese Treaty of Peace Act 1951	15 & 16 Geo. 6 & 1 Eliz. 2. c. 6	7 December 1951
An Act to provide for carrying into effect the Treaty of Peace with Japan and Protocol thereto.
Border Rivers (Prevention of Pollution) Act 1951 (repealed)	15 & 16 Geo. 6 & 1 Eliz. 2. c. 7	7 December 1951
An Act to make provision for the constitution of, and other matters relating to, joint committees of river boards and river purification boards on either side of the border in connection with the functions of those boards relating to the prevention of river pollution. (Repealed by Water Act 1989 (c. 15))
Home Guard Act 1951 (repealed)	15 & 16 Geo. 6 & 1 Eliz. 2. c. 8	7 December 1951
An Act to establish the Home Guard and for purposes connected therewith. (Repealed by Reserve Forces Act 1996 (c. 14))
Ministers of the Crown (Parliamentary Under-Secretaries) Act 1951 (Note: This was the last public act of the reign of King George VI.) (repealed)	15 & 16 Geo. 6 & 1 Eliz. 2. c. 9	7 December 1951
An Act to amend certain provisions of the Ministers of the Crown Act, 1937, (Note: Ministers of the Crown Act 1937 (1 Edw. 8. & 1 Geo. 6. c. 38)) relating to Parliamentary Under-Secretaries. (Repealed by Ministers of the Crown (Parliamentary Secretaries) Act 1960 (9 & 10 Eliz. 2. c. 6))

=== Sources ===
- The Public General Acts and Church Assembly Measures of 1951. London: Her Majesty's Stationery Office. 1951. pp. 656–675 – via Google Books.
- The Public General Acts and Church Assembly Measures of 1951. London: Her Majesty's Stationery Office. 1951. pp. 656–675 – via Google Books.
- The Journals of the House of Commons (PDF). Vol. 207 (October 1951 – October 1952). pp. 3–384 – via parliament.uk.
- Chronological Table of the Statutes: Covering the Period from 1235 to the End of 1971. London: Her Majesty's Stationery Office. 1972. p. 1055. ISBN 978-0-11-840096-1 – via Google Books.
- "UK Public General Acts from 1951". legislation.gov.uk. The National Archives.

== See also ==
- List of acts of the Parliament of the United Kingdom
