= National Health Service Act =

National Health Service Act may refer to any of the following Acts of Parliament:

- National Health Service Act 1946 (9 & 10 Geo. 6. c. 81)
- National Health Service (Scotland) Act 1947 (10 & 11 Geo. 6. c. 27)
- National Health Service (Amendment) Act 1949 (12, 13 & 14 Geo. 6. c. 93)
- National Health Service Act 1951 (14 & 15 Geo. 6. c. 31)
- National Health Service Act 1952 (15 & 16 Geo. 6 & 1 Eliz. 2. c. 25)
- National Health Service Act 1977 (c. 49)
- National Health Service Act 2006 (c. 41)
- National Health Service (Wales) Act 2006 (c. 42)
