= National Health Service Act 1952 =

Act of the Parliament of the United Kingdom

National Health Service Act 1952 (Note: Section 9(1).)
- Act of Parliament
- Parliament of the United Kingdom
- Long title: An Act to make further provision with respect to the making and recovery of charges in respect of services provided under the National Health Service Act, 1946 and the National Health Service (Scotland) Act, 1947; and for purposes connected therewith.
- Citation: 15 & 16 Geo. 6 & 1 Eliz. 2. c. 25
- Territorial extent: England and Wales; Scotland; (Note: Section 9(4).)

Dates
- Royal assent: 22 May 1952
- Commencement: 29 May 1952 (Note: Section 9(3).)
- Repealed: England and Wales: 29 August 1977; Scotland: 1 January 1979
Other legislation
Amends	National Health Service Act 1946; National Health Service (Scotland) Act 1947
Amended by	Theft Act 1968
Repealed by	England and Wales: National Health Service Act 1977; Scotland: National Health Service (Scotland) Act 1978

Status: Repealed

Text of statute as originally enacted

The National Health Service Act 1952 (15 & 16 Geo. 6 & 1 Eliz. 2. c. 25) was an act of the Parliament of the United Kingdom. It extended prescription charges and dental charges for National Health Service patients. The one shilling charge for prescriptions was introduced on 1 June 1952.

The prescription charge and additional charges for "amenity" beds in hospitals were enacted under the National Health Service (Amendment) Act 1949. The 1952 Act extended prescription charges issued by hospital out-patient departments; enacted further dental charges; enacted charges for hospital appliances and allowed local authorities to charge for the use of day nurseries. People who received national assistance and their dependents were able to reclaim the cost of the prescription. War pensioners were also able to claim back the cost if the prescription related to their war disability.

Aneurin Bevan, the former Minister of Health who founded the NHS, issued a statement on 1 February 1952 condemning the Act:

I have just been studying the new National Health Service Bill. If this is carried into law it means that the free Health Service is dead. The present charges on dentures and spectacles were to end in 1954. This Bill makes them permanent. ... This means that what we said at the General Election is now amply confirmed. The temporary financial crisis has been eagerly seized upon as an excuse to destroy the National Health Service.

The Minister of Health, Iain Macleod, told the London Constitutional Club on 30 May that Labour's fury at the charges were synthetic:

They pioneered this field; we only follow their lead. We are implementing in the 1s. prescription charge the Socialist Act of 1949. ... If the charge on prescriptions enables the general practitioner to give more freely of his skill and time to those who really need his care that will be a great gain. I think the prescription charge will have that effect. The dental charges will ensure that expectant mothers and babies, schoolchildren and adolescents have the priority that the Socialists promised them and failed to give. ... Charges there must certainly be now and for some time to come, but the Government in this Act do not declare that charges must or should remain a permanent part of the national health service.

The number of NHS prescriptions for July–December 1948 was 78,364,281, for 1949 188,479,670, for 1950 202,004,872, for 1951 211,232,428, for 1952 200,467,996, for 1953 204,181,431, and for 1954 203,071,240.

== Subsequent developments ==
The whole act was repealed for England and Wales by section 129 of, and schedule 16 to, the National Health Service Act 1977, which came into force on 29 August 1977.

The whole act was repealed for Scotland by section 109(b) of, and schedule 17 to, the National Health Service (Scotland) Act 1978, which came into force on 1 January 1979.
