= National Health Service (Scotland) Act 1978 =

Act of the Parliament of the United Kingdom

National Health Service (Scotland) Act 1978 (Note: Section 110(1).)
- Act of Parliament
- Parliament of the United Kingdom
- Long title: An Act to consolidate certain enactments relating to the national health service in Scotland.
- Citation: 1978 c. 29
- Territorial extent: Scotland (Note: Section 110(2). Paragraph 3 of Schedule 10 additionally extends to other parts of the United Kingdom: section 110(3).)

Dates
- Royal assent: 20 July 1978
- Commencement: 1 January 1979 (Note: Section 110(4).)

Other legislation
- Amends: Law Reform (Personal Injuries) Act 1948; See § Repealed enactments
- Repeals/revokes: See § Repealed enactments
- Amended by: Education (Scotland) Act 1980; Overseas Development and Co-operation Act 1980; Medical Act 1983; Dentists Act 1984; Mental Health (Scotland) Act 1984; Law Reform (Miscellaneous Provisions) (Scotland) Act 1985; Statute Law (Repeals) Act 1986; Opticians Act 1989; Social Security (Consequential Provisions) Act 1992; Tribunals and Inquiries Act 1992; Health Service Commissioners Act 1993; Statute Law (Repeals) Act 1993; Criminal Procedure (Consequential Provisions) (Scotland) Act 1995; Smoking, Health and Social Care (Scotland) Act 2005
- Relates to: National Health Service Act 1977

Status: Amended

Text of statute as originally enacted

Revised text of statute as amended

Text of the National Health Service (Scotland) Act 1978 as in force today (including any amendments) within the United Kingdom, from legislation.gov.uk.

The National Health Service (Scotland) Act 1978 (c. 29) is an act of the Parliament of the United Kingdom that consolidated certain enactments relating to the national health service in Scotland.

== Provisions ==
=== Repealed enactments ===
Section 109(b) of the act repealed 16 enactments, listed in schedule 17 to the act.

Citation	Short title	Extent of repeal
10 & 11 Geo. 6. c. 27	National Health Service (Scotland) Act 1947	The whole act.
12, 13 & 14 Geo. 6. c. 93	National Health Service (Amendment) Act 1949	Section 8.
12, 13 & 14 Geo. 6. c. 93	National Health Service (Amendment) Act 1949	Sections 10 and 11.
12, 13 & 14 Geo. 6. c. 93	National Health Service (Amendment) Act 1949	Sections 14 to 18.
12, 13 & 14 Geo. 6. c. 93	National Health Service (Amendment) Act 1949	Sections 20(1), (3) and 21.
12, 13 & 14 Geo. 6. c. 93	National Health Service (Amendment) Act 1949	Sections 23 and 28.
12, 13 & 14 Geo. 6. c. 93	National Health Service (Amendment) Act 1949	In section 32(1), the words "and this Act" where they second occur to "1947 and 1949".
12, 13 & 14 Geo. 6. c. 93	National Health Service (Amendment) Act 1949	In the Schedule, Part II.
14 & 15 Geo. 6. c. 31	National Health Service Act 1951	The whole act.
15 & 16 Geo. 6 & 1 Eliz. 2. c. 25	National Health Service Act 1952	The whole act.
1 & 2 Eliz. 2. c. 41	Hospital Endowments (Scotland) Act 1953	The whole act.
9 & 10 Eliz. 2. c. 19	National Health Service Act 1961	The whole act.
1964 c. 60	Emergency Laws (Re-enactments and Repeals) Act 1964	Section 5.
1964 c. 60	Emergency Laws (Re-enactments and Repeals) Act 1964	In section 15, the words "the National Health Service (Scotland) Acts 1947 to 1972".
1966 c. 8	National Health Service Act 1966	In section 12(2), from the words "so far as" where they second occur to the end.
1968 c. 46	Health Services and Public Health Act 1968	Part I.
1968 c. 46	Health Services and Public Health Act 1968	In section 63(8), in paragraph (b) of "the relevant enactments", the words "the 1947 Act".
1968 c. 46	Health Services and Public Health Act 1968	In section 64(4), in the substituted paragraph (a), the words "the National Health Service (Scotland) Act 1947."
1968 c. 46	Health Services and Public Health Act 1968	In section 79(1), from the words "and the" where they second occur to the words "1947 to 1968".
1968 c. 46	Health Services and Public Health Act 1968	In Schedule 2, Part II.
1968 c. 46	Health Services and Public Health Act 1968	In Schedule 3, Part I.
1968 c. 67	Medicines Act 1968	In Schedule 5, paragraph 12.
1971 c. 8	Hospital Endowments (Scotland) Act 1971	The whole act.
1972 c. 58	National Health Service (Scotland) Act 1972	The whole act except sections 24(2), 26 to 28, 32 to 36, 52, 53, 61(1)–(3), and Schedule 4.
1973 c. 32	National Health Service Reorganisation Act 1973	The whole act.
1976 c. 48	Parliamentary and other Pensions and Salaries Act 1976	Section 7.
1976 c. 59	National Health Service (Vocational Training) Act 1976	The whole act.
1976 c. 83	Health Services Act 1976	Section 2.
1976 c. 83	Health Services Act 1976	Sections 4 and 5.
1976 c. 83	Health Services Act 1976	Sections 7 to 11.
1976 c. 83	Health Services Act 1976	In section 23— (a) in subsection (1), the definitions of "the 1947 Act" and "the National Health Service Acts"; (b) subsections (3) and (4).
1976 c. 83	Health Services Act 1976	In Schedule 1, Part VI.
1976 c. 83	Health Services Act 1976	Schedule 3.
1976 c. 83	Health Services Act 1976	In Schedule 4, Part II.
