= National Assistance Act 1948 =

Act of the Parliament of the United Kingdom

National Assistance Act 1948 (Note: Section 67(1).)
- Act of Parliament
- Parliament of the United Kingdom
- Long title: An Act to terminate the existing poor law and to provide in lieu thereof for the assistance of persons in need by the National Assistance Board and by local authorities; to make further provision for the welfare of disabled, sick, aged and other persons and for regulating homes for disabled and aged persons and charities for disabled persons; to amend the law relating to non-contributory old age pensions; to make provision as to the burial or cremation of deceased persons; and for purposes connected with the matters aforesaid.
- Citation: 11 & 12 Geo. 6. c. 29
- Territorial extent: England & Wales; Scotland; Northern Ireland (in part); (Note: Section 66.)

Dates
- Royal assent: 13 May 1948
- Commencement: 5 July 1948 (except sections 37–40); 1 November 1949 (sections 37–40, except 37(1), (6) and (7)); 1 July 1950 (section 37(1), (6) and (7)); (Note: Section 67(2). The National Assistance Act (Appointed Day) (Scotland) Order 1948 (SI 1948/1207), National Assistance Act (Appointed Day) Order 1948 (SI 1948/1218), National Assistance Act (Appointed Day) Order 1949 (SI 1949/1621) and National Assistance Act (Appointed Day) (Scotland) Order, 1949 (SI 1949/1667).)
Other legislation
Amends	See § Repealed enactments
Repeals/revokes	See § Repealed enactments
Amended by	Justices of the Peace Act 1949; National Health Service Act 1951; National Assistance (Amendment) Act 1951; Statute Law Revision Act 1953; Mental Health Act 1959; Mental Health (Scotland) Act 1960; National Assistance Act 1948 (Amendment) Act 1962; Purchase Tax Act 1963; Statute Law Revision Act 1964; Ministry of Social Security Act 1966; Social Work (Scotland) Act 1968; Statute Law (Repeals) Act 1977; Domestic Proceedings and Magistrates' Courts Act 1978; Statute Law (Repeals) Act 1978; Residential Homes Act 1980; Acquisition of Land Act 1981; Public Health (Control of Disease) Act 1984; Law Reform (Parent and Child) (Scotland) Act 1986; Family Law Reform Act 1987; Statute Law (Repeals) Act 1989; Immigration and Asylum Act 1999; Health and Social Care Act 2001; Mental Capacity Act 2005; National Health Service (Consequential Provisions) Act 2006; Mental Health Act 2007

Status: Amended

Text of statute as originally enacted

Revised text of statute as amended

Text of the National Assistance Act 1948 as in force today (including any amendments) within the United Kingdom, from legislation.gov.uk.

The National Assistance Act 1948 (11 & 12 Geo. 6. c. 29) is an act of the Parliament of the United Kingdom passed by the Labour government of Clement Attlee. It formally abolished the Poor Law system that had existed since the reign of Elizabeth I, and established a social safety net for those who had not paid enough national insurance contributions to qualify for contribution based welfare payments (such as the homeless, the physically disabled, and unmarried mothers) and were therefore left uncovered by the National Insurance Act 1946 and the National Insurance (Industrial Injuries) Act 1946. It also provided help to elderly people who required supplementary benefits to make a subsistence living, and obliged local authorities to provide suitable accommodation for those who through infirmity, age, or any other reason were "in need of care and attention not otherwise available to them". The legislation also empowered local authorities to grant financial aid to organizations of volunteers concerned with the provision of recreational facilities or meals. The Act also created a system of state run, or state administered, re-establishment centres, for those lacking regular occupation or sufficient training, to get them back into work, and resettlement centres, for homeless people, aimed at influencing them to lead a more settled life.

The National Assistance Board, which administered the National Assistance scheme, operated scale rates which were more generous than in the past. The rate for a married couple before the new service was launched, for instance, was 31 shillings (£1.55) a week, and 40 shillings (£2.00) a week when the new service was introduced, together with an allowance for rent. In addition, as noted by Denis Nowell Pritt, "In most cases where the applicant was a householder, the rent allowance was the actual rent paid."

Under Section 29 of the act, the power was granted to local authorities to promote the welfare of physically disabled individuals. The social needs of the mentally disabled were to be the responsibility of mental health departments which, being part of the new National Health Service, were to provide its services to all those who needed it, regardless of ability to pay.

== Provisions ==
=== Repealed enactments ===
Section 62(3) of the act repealed 80 enactments, listed in parts I, II and III of the seventh schedule to the act.

Part I – The existing poor law
Citation	Short title	Extent of repeal
5 Geo. 1. c. 8	Poor Relief (Deserted Wives and Children) Act 1718	The whole act.
5 Geo. 4. c. 83	Vagrancy Act 1824	In section three, the words from the beginning to "settled in such other parish, township, or place"; in section four, the words "every person running away and leaving his wife, or his or her child or children, chargeable, or whereby she or they or any of them shall become chargeable, to any parish, township, or place".
5 & 6 Vict. c. 57	Poor Law Amendment Act 1842	The whole act.
7 & 8 Vict. c. 101	Poor Law Amendment Act 1844	Sections six and seven; in section eight the words from the beginning to "misdemeanour"; section sixty-three.
8 & 9 Vict. c. 117	Poor Removal Act 1845	The whole act.
10 & 11 Vict. c. 33	Poor Removal Act 1847	The whole act.
12 & 13 Vict. c. 103	Poor Law Amendment Act 1849	The whole act.
20 & 21 Vict. c. 13	Workhouse Sites Act 1857	The whole act.
20 & 21 Vict. c. 81	Burial Act 1857	Section six, so far as it authorises the consecration and use of new burial grounds.
24 & 25 Vict. c. 76	Poor Removal (No. 2) Act 1861	The whole act.
25 & 26 Vict. c. 113	Poor Removal Act 1862	The whole act.
26 & 27 Vict. c. 89	Poor Removal Act 1863	The whole act.
39 & 40 Vict. c. 61	Divided Parishes and Poor Law Amendment Act 1876	Sections nineteen, twenty-four and forty-two.
63 & 64 Vict. c. 23	Poor Removal Act 1900	The whole act.
20 & 21 Geo. 5. c. 17	Poor Law Act 1930	The whole act.
24 & 25 Geo. 5. c. 59	Poor Law Act 1934	The whole act.
1 & 2 Geo. 6. c. 23	Poor Law (Amendment) Act 1938	The whole act.

Part II – The existing poor law in Scotland
Citation	Short title	Extent of repeal
8 & 9 Vict. c. 83	Poor Law (Scotland) Act 1845	The whole act.
19 & 20 Vict. c. 117	Poor Law (Scotland) Act 1856	The whole act.
49 & 50 Vict. c. 51	Poor Law Loans and Relief (Scotland) Act 1886	The whole act.
61 & 62 Vict. c. 21	Poor Law (Scotland) Act 1888	The whole act.
11 & 12 Geo. 5. c. 64	Poor Law Emergency Provisions (Scotland) Act 1921	The whole act.
13 & 14 Geo. 5. c. 6	Local Authorities (Emergency Provisions) Act 1923	The whole act.
14 & 15 Geo. 5. c. 9	Poor Law Emergency Provisions Continuance (Scotland) Act 1924	The whole act.
15 & 16 Geo. 5. c. 35	Poor Law Emergency Provisions Continuance (Scotland) Act 1925	The whole act.
17 & 18 Geo. 5. c. 3	Poor Law Emergency Provisions (Scotland) Act 1927	The whole act.
24 & 25 Geo. 5. c. 52	Poor Law (Scotland) Act 1934	The whole act.

Part III – Other enactments repealed
Citation	Short title	Extent of repeal
24 Geo. 2. c. 40	Sale of Spirits Act 1750	Sections thirteen to sixteen, so far as they relate to workhouses and houses of entertainment for any parish poor.
48 Geo. 3. c. 75	Burial of Drowned Persons Act 1808	The whole act.
1 & 2 Will. 4. c. 37	Truck Act 1831	Section seven.
1 & 2 Will. 4. c. 41	Special Constables Act 1831	Section twelve.
2 & 3 Vict. c. 51	Pensions Act 1839	Sections two to four; in section seven the words "the minute of any board of guardians and"; in section eight from "except to the guardians" to "in such parish", from "other than the guardians" to "Scotland as aforesaid", and from "which shall not be given" to "advancing the same"; section ten; the Schedules.
8 & 9 Vict. c. 19	Lands Clauses Consolidation (Scotland) Act 1845	In section one hundred and twenty-seven, the words "poor's rate or" and "and poor's rate".
11 & 12 Vict. c. 43	Summary Jurisdiction Act 1848	In section thirty-five, the words "to any warrant or order for the removal of any poor person who is or shall become chargeable to any parish, township, or place; nor".
15 & 16 Vict. c. 85	Burial Act 1852	Section forty-nine.
16 & 17 Vict. c. 134	Burial Act 1853	In section seven, the words from "and section forty-nine" to "parish".
24 & 25 Vict. c. 100	Offences Against the Person Act 1861	Section seventy-three.
29 & 30 Vict. c. 109	Naval Discipline Act 1866	In section ninety-eight A, in subsection (2), the words from "or of leaving" to the end of the subsection.
35 & 36 Vict. c. 65	Bastardy Laws Amendment Act 1872	Section seven.
36 & 37 Vict. c. 9	Bastardy Laws Amendment Act 1873	Section five.
42 & 43 Vict. c. 49	Summary Jurisdiction Act 1879	In section thirty-one, subsection (2).
49 & 50 Vict. c. 15	Sporting Lands Rating (Scotland) Act 1886	In section two, the definition of "The Poor Law Act"; in section three, the words "and The Poor Law Act", section five, in section seven the words from "or upon" where those words first occur to "The Poor Law Act", and the words from "or upon" in the second place where those words occur to the end of the section.
49 & 50 Vict. c. 20	Burial of Drowned Persons Act 1886	The whole act.
57 & 58 Vict. c. 58	Local Government (Scotland) Act 1894	In section thirty, in subsection (6) the words from "Provided that" to "poor rate"; in section fifty-four, in the definition of "parish", the words from "for the purposes of" to the end of the definition.
57 & 58 Vict. c. 60	Merchant Shipping Act 1894	In section one hundred and five, the words from "with the concurrence" to the end; sections one hundred and six, one hundred and seven; section one hundred and eighty-five; in section three hundred and ninety-three, subsection (3).
60 & 61 Vict. c. 31	Cleansing of Persons Act 1897	In section one, the words from "the use of such apparatus" to "disability" and the words "or for the relief of the poor".
60 & 61 Vict. c. 38	Public Health (Scotland) Act 1897	In section sixty-nine, in subsection (1) the words from "or (d) any dead body" to "bury it"; in section seventy, the words "(otherwise than at a poor house)".
61 & 62 Vict. c. 60	Inebriates Act 1898	In section twenty-five, paragraph (j).
8 Edw. 7. c. 65	Summary Jurisdiction (Scotland) Act 1908	In section four, in the last paragraph, the words from "to any warrant" to "district nor".
3 & 4 Geo. 5. c. 28	Mental Deficiency Act 1913	In section two, in subsection (1), paragraph (b)(vi); in section thirty, proviso (ii).
3 & 4 Geo. 5. c. 38	Mental Deficiency and Lunacy (Scotland) Act 1913	In section three, in subsection (1) paragraph (c)(vi) and (vii); in section fifteen, subsection (3).
9 & 10 Geo. 5. c. 20	Scottish Board of Health Act 1919	In section four, in subsection (3) the words from "and it is hereby declared" to the end of the subsection.
10 & 11 Geo. 5. c. 49	Blind Persons Act 1920	The whole act.
11 & 12 Geo. 5. c. 31	Police Pensions Act 1921	In section fourteen, paragraph (2).
13 & 14 Geo. 5. c. 23	Bastardy Act 1923	Section three.
19 & 20 Geo. 5. c. 17	Local Government Act 1929	Part I, except section fifteen and paragraphs (g) and (h) of section eighteen; section one hundred and two.
19 & 20 Geo. 5. c. 25	Local Government (Scotland) Act 1929	Sections thirty-two and sixty-four.
20 & 21 Geo. 5. c. 33	Illegitimate Children (Scotland) Act 1930	Section four.
23 & 24 Geo. 5. c. 12	Children and Young Persons Act 1933	In section thirty-five, in the proviso to subsection (1) and in subsection (2) the words "or poor law"; in section seventy-two, in subsection (3), the words "or poor law" in each place where they occur; in section eighty-nine, subsection (4); in section ninety-six, in subsection (4), the words from "(a) in the case" to "other case"; in section ninety-eight, in subsection (1), the words "or a poor law authority"; in section one hundred and seven, in the definition of "place of safety", the word "workhouse", and the definition of "poor law authority".
23 & 24 Geo. 5. c. 38	Summary Jurisdiction (Appeals) Act 1933	In section nine, subsection (2).
23 & 24 Geo. 5. c. 51	Local Government Act 1933	In section fifty-nine, in subsection (1), paragraphs (c) and (h) and proviso (iv); in section one hundred and eighteen the words "of officers appointed under the Poor Law Act, 1930 or".
24 & 25 Geo. 5. c. 29	Unemployment Act 1934	The whole act.
26 Geo. 5 & 1 Edw. 8. c. 31	Old Age Pensions Act 1936	In section three, in subsection (1), paragraphs (a) and (c), and the words "subject to the provisions of this section", and subsections (2) and (3); in section nine, subsections (3) and (4); section ten; in section twelve, in subsection (1), paragraph (d), in subsection (2) the words from "and for registered notice" to "by them", and subsection (4); in section thirteen, subsection (1).
26 Geo. 5 & 1 Edw. 8. c. 49	Public Health Act 1936	In section two hundred and twenty, in the definition of "place of safety", the words "public assistance institution".
26 Geo. 5 & 1 Edw. 8. c. 50	Public Health (London) Act 1936	Section two hundred and twenty-four; in section three hundred and four, in the definition of "place of safety" the word "workhouse".
1 Edw. 8 & 1 Geo. 6. c. 37	Children and Young Persons (Scotland) Act 1937	In section eleven, in subsection (2) the words from "or to any person" to "relief of the poor"; in section forty-three, in the proviso to subsection (2) and in subsection (2) the words "or poor law"; in section seventy-six, in subsection (3), the words "or poor law" in each place where they occur; in section ninety-three, subsection (4); section one hundred; in section one hundred and one, subsection (2); in subsection (2) from the words "and expenses" to the end of the subsection; in subsection (7) the words "a poor law authority"; in section one hundred and two, the words "or a poor law authority"; in section one hundred and six, subsection (2); in section one hundred and ten, in the definition of "place of safety" the word "poorhouse", and the definition of "poor law authority".
1 & 2 Geo. 6. c. 11	Blind Persons Act 1938	Sections two to four; in section five the definition of "medical assistance".
2 & 3 Geo. 6. c. 40	London Government Act 1939	In section thirty-three, in subsection (1) paragraph (c) and in subsection (2) paragraph (e); in section thirty-four, in subsection (1), paragraph (a); in section eighty-five the words "of officers appointed under the Poor Law Act, 1930 or"; in section one hundred and sixty-six, the proviso to subsection (1).
2 & 3 Geo. 6. c. 93	Unemployment Assistance (Emergency Powers) Act 1939	The whole act.
3 & 4 Geo. 6. c. 13	Old Age and Widows' Pensions Act 1940	The whole act, except sections eighteen and twenty-one.
3 & 4 Geo. 6. c. 31	War Charities Act 1940	In section fourteen, in subsection (3), paragraph (a) of the proviso.
3 & 4 Geo. 6. c. 44	Unemployment Insurance Act 1940	The whole act.
4 & 5 Geo. 6. c. 11	Determination of Needs Act 1941	The whole act.
6 & 7 Geo. 6. c. 27	Pensions and Determination of Needs Act 1943	The whole act, except subsection (2) of section five, section nine and the Second Schedule.
9 & 10 Geo. 6. c. 62	National Insurance (Industrial Injuries) Act 1946	Section thirty-one.
9 & 10 Geo. 6. c. 67	National Insurance Act 1946	In section thirty, in subsection (1) paragraph (c) and in subsection (5) paragraph (a); in section sixty-eight, subsection (2) so far as it relates to Parts I or III of the Twelfth Schedule, subsection (3), in subsection (4) the words "and subsection (2) of section forty-two of the Unemployment Assistance Act, 1934", and subsection (6); in the Eleventh Schedule, Parts I and III; in the Twelfth Schedule, Parts I and III.
9 & 10 Geo. 6. c. 81	National Health Service Act 1946	In section fifty, subsection (4).
10 & 11 Geo. 6. c. 19	Polish Resettlement Act 1947	In section two, subsections (1), (3) and (4); in the Schedule, Part I.
10 & 11 Geo. 6. c. 27	National Health Service (Scotland) Act 1947	In section fifty, subsection (4).
10 & 11 Geo. 6. c. 43	Local Government (Scotland) Act 1947	In section seventy-three, subsection (3); in section one hundred and five, in subsection (3) the words "and the town council of every large burgh", the words "or schemes", and the words from "(a) poor law" to "of county council"; in section one hundred and seven, subsection (2); in subsection (3) the words "poor law or", and subsection (4); in section one hundred and eleven, in subsection (2) the words from "or any committee" to "poor law"; in section one hundred and forty, in subsection (1), the words from "and in the case of" to the end of the subsection; in section three hundred and seventy-nine, in subsection (1), the definition of "Poor Law Acts".

=== Territorial extent ===
The act applied across the United Kingdom but sections 65-67 outlined several distinctions as to how the act applied in Scotland, the Scilly Isles and Northern Ireland.

== See also ==
- Pensions in the United Kingdom

== Bibliography ==
- Byrne, Tony; Padfield, Colin F. (1983), Social Services, Made Simple Books, William Heinemann, ISBN 978-0-434-98570-8
- Pritt, Denis Nowell (1963), The Labour Government 1945–51, Lawrence & Wishart
- Taylor, David (1988), Mastering Economic and Social History, Palgrave Macmillan, ISBN 978-0-333-36804-6
