= Nurses, Midwives and Health Visitors Act 1979 =

Act of the Parliament of the United Kingdom

Nurses, Midwives and Health Visitors Act 1979 (Note: Section 24(1).)
- Act of Parliament
- Parliament of the United Kingdom
- Long title: An Act to establish a Central Council for Nursing, Midwifery and Health Visiting, and National Boards for the four parts of the United Kingdom; to make new provision with respect to the education, training, regulation and discipline of nurses, midwives and health visitors and the maintenance of a single professional register; to amend an Act relating to the Central Council for Education and Training in Social Work; and for purposes connected with those matters.
- Citation: 1979 c. 36
- Territorial extent: United Kingdom (Note: Section 24(3).)

Dates
- Royal assent: 4 April 1979
- Commencement: various (Note: Section 24(2).)

Other legislation
- Amends: Nurses Agencies Act 1957; Restrictive Trade Practices Act 1976
- Repeals/revokes: Midwives Act 1951; Midwives (Scotland) Act 1951; Nurses Act 1957; Nurses (Amendment) Act 1961; Nurses Act 1964; Teachers of Nursing Act 1967; Nurses Act 1969; Nurses and Midwives Act (Northern Ireland) 1970
- Amended by: Law Reform (Miscellaneous Provisions) (Scotland) Act 1980; Statute Law (Repeals) Act 1981; Registered Homes Act 1984; Nurses, Midwives and Health Visitors Act 1992; Trade Union Reform and Employment Rights Act 1993; Nurses, Midwives and Health Visitors Act 1997

Status: Partially repealed

Text of statute as originally enacted

Revised text of statute as amended

Text of the Nurses, Midwives and Health Visitors Act 1979 as in force today (including any amendments) within the United Kingdom, from legislation.gov.uk.

The Nurses, Midwives and Health Visitors Act 1979 (c. 36) is an act of the Parliament of the United Kingdom. It received royal assent in April 1979.

It led to the establishment of the United Kingdom Central Council for Nursing, Midwifery and Health Visiting(UKCC) and national boards for each country of the UK, to be responsible for education, training, regulation and disciplinary action of nurses, midwives and health visitors.

The act was developed by a committee established to implement the recommendations of the Briggs Report of 1972. It was finally implemented in July 1983.

The act superseded the Midwives Act 1902 (2 Edw. 7. c. 17) and led to the replacement of the Central Midwives Board. Midwives such as Brenda Mee fought to ensure that midwives would be the majority on each midwifery committee, and that their views would be represented when proposals were put forward concerning midwifery.

== Subsequent developments ==
There were subsequent acts in 1992 and 1997. The Nurses, Midwives and Health Visitors Act 1992 established that investigation of misconduct was the responsibility of the UKCC and not the national boards. The Nurses, Midwives and Health Visitors Act 1997 made adjustments to the structure and composition of the UKCC.

The whole act was repealed by section 23(3) of, and schedule 6 to, the Nurses, Midwives and Health Visitors Act 1997, which came into force on 19 June 1997.

== See also ==
- Nurses Registration Act 1919
