= Midwives (Scotland) Act 1951 =

Act of the Parliament of the United Kingdom

Midwives (Scotland) Act 1951 (Note: Section 38(1).)
- Act of Parliament
- Parliament of the United Kingdom
- Long title: An Act to consolidate certain enactments relating to midwives in Scotland.
- Citation: 14 & 15 Geo. 6. c. 54
- Territorial extent: Scotland (Note: Section 38(2).)

Dates
- Royal assent: 1 August 1951
- Commencement: 1 September 1951 (Note: Section 38(3).)
- Repealed: 1 July 1983
Other legislation
Amends	See § Repealed enactments
Repeals/revokes	See § Repealed enactments
Amended by	Statute Law (Repeals) Act 1974; Law Reform (Miscellaneous Provisions) (Scotland) Act 1980
Repealed by	Nurses, Midwives and Health Visitors Act 1979
Relates to	Midwives Act 1951; Nurses (Scotland) Act 1951

Status: Repealed

Text of statute as originally enacted

The Midwives (Scotland) Act 1951 (14 & 15 Geo. 6. c. 54) was an act of the Parliament of the United Kingdom that consolidated enactments related to midwives in Scotland.

The Midwives Act 1951 (14 & 15 Geo. 6. c. 53) made similar provisions for England and Wales.

== Provisions ==
=== Repealed enactments ===
Section 36(1) of the act repealed 7 enactments, listed in part I of the second schedule to the act.

Citation	Short title	Extent of repeal
5 & 6 Geo. 5. c. 91	Midwives (Scotland) Act 1915	The whole act.
9 & 10 Geo. 5. c. 20	Scottish Board of Health Act 1919	In section four, in subsection (1), paragraph (c).
17 & 18 Geo. 5. c. 17	Midwives (Scotland) Act 1927	The whole act.
1 Edw. 8 & 1 Geo. 6. c. 30	Maternity Services (Scotland) Act 1937	The whole act.
10 & 11 Geo. 6. c. 27	National Health Service (Scotland) Act 1947	In section twenty-three, subsection (1).
12, 13 & 14 Geo. 6. c. 93	National Health Service (Amendment) Act 1949	In section twenty-nine, subsections (2) and (4).
14 Geo. 6. c. 13	Midwives (Amendment) Act 1950	The whole act.

== Subsequent developments ==
Section 36(1) of, and schedule 2 to, the act were repealed by section 1 of, and part XI of the schedule to, the Statute Law (Repeals) Act 1974, which came into force on 27 June 1974.

The whole act was repealed by section 23(5) of, and the eighth schedule to, the Nurses, Midwives and Health Visitors Act 1979, which came into operation on 1 July 1983.
