= Nurses (Scotland) Act 1951 =

Act of the Parliament of the United Kingdom

Nurses (Scotland) Act 1951 (Note: Section 36(1).)
- Act of Parliament
- Parliament of the United Kingdom
- Long title: An Act to consolidate certain enactments relating to nurses for the sick in Scotland.
- Citation: 14 & 15 Geo. 6. c. 55
- Territorial extent: Scotland (Note: Section 36(2).)

Dates
- Royal assent: 1 August 1951
- Commencement: 1 September 1951 (Note: Section 36(3).)
- Repealed: 1 April 2002

Other legislation
- Amends: See § Repealed enactments
- Repeals/revokes: See § Repealed enactments
- Amended by: Statute Law (Repeals) Act 1974
- Repealed by: Regulation of Care (Scotland) Act 2001
- Relates to: Midwives (Scotland) Act 1951; Nurses Act 1957

Status: Repealed

Text of statute as originally enacted

The Nurses (Scotland) Act 1951 (14 & 15 Geo. 6. c. 55) was an act of the Parliament of the United Kingdom that consolidated enactments related to nurses for the sick in Scotland.

== Provisions ==
=== Repealed enactments ===
Section 35(1) of the act repealed 4 enactments, listed in the fifth schedule to the act.

| Citation | Short title | Extent of repeal |
|---|---|---|
| 9 & 10 Geo. 5. c. 95 | Nurses Registration (Scotland) Act 1919 | The whole act. |
| 6 & 7 Geo. 6. c. 33 | Nurses (Scotland) Act 1943 | The whole act. |
| 8 & 9 Geo. 6. c. 6 | Nurses Act 1945 | Section two; in section three, the words from "and the Nurses (Scotland) Acts, 1919 and 1943" to the end of the section. |
| 12, 13 & 14 Geo. 6. c. 95 | Nurses (Scotland) Act 1949 | The whole act. |

== Subsequent developments ==
Section 35(1) of, and schedule 5 to, the act were repealed by section 1 of, and part XI of the schedule to, the Statute Law (Repeals) Act 1974, which came into force on 27 June 1974.

The whole act was repealed by section 80(1) of, and schedule 4 to, the Regulation of Care (Scotland) Act 2001 (asp 8), which came into force on 1 April 2002.
