= Midwives Act 1951 =

Act of the Parliament of the United Kingdom

Midwives Act 1951 (Note: Section 36(1).)
- Act of Parliament
- Parliament of the United Kingdom
- Long title: An Act to consolidate certain enactments relating to midwives.
- Citation: 14 & 15 Geo. 6. c. 53
- Territorial extent: England and Wales (Note: Section 36(2).)

Dates
- Royal assent: 1 August 1951
- Commencement: 1 September 1951 (Note: Section 36(3).)
- Repealed: 1 July 1983
Other legislation
Amends	See § Repealed enactments
Repeals/revokes	See § Repealed enactments
Amended by	Charities Act 1960; Statute Law Revision Act 1964; Criminal Justice Act 1972; Statute Law (Repeals) Act 1974
Repealed by	Nurses, Midwives and Health Visitors Act 1979

Status: Repealed

Text of statute as originally enacted

The Midwives Act 1951 (14 & 15 Geo. 6. c. 53) was an act of the Parliament of the United Kingdom that consolidated enactments related to midwives in England and Wales.

The Midwives (Scotland) Act 1951 (14 & 15 Geo. 6. c. 54) made similar provisions for Scotland.

== Provisions ==
=== Repealed enactments ===
Section 34(1) of the act repealed 8 enactments, listed in Part I of the second schedule to the act.

Citation	Short title	Extent of repeal
2 Edw. 7. c. 17	Midwives Act 1902	The whole act.
8 & 9 Geo. 5. c. 43	Midwives Act 1918	The whole act.
9 & 10 Geo. 5. c. 21	Ministry of Health Act 1919	In section three, in subsection (1), paragraph (e).
16 & 17 Geo. 5. c. 32	Midwives Act 1926	The whole act.
26 Geo. 5 & 1 Edw. 8. c. 40	Midwives Act 1936	In section five, subsections (8) and (9). Sections six to ten. In section eleven, subsection (2). The Second Schedule.
9 & 10 Geo. 6. c. 81	National Health Service Act 1946	In section twenty-three, subsections (1) and (3).
12, 13 & 14 Geo. 6. c. 93	National Health Service (Amendment) Act 1949	In section twenty-nine, subsection (2). In the First Schedule, the fourth paragraph.
14 Geo. 6. c. 13	Midwives (Amendment) Act 1950	The whole act.

== Subsequent developments ==
Section 22 of the act was repealed by section 64(2) of, and part I of schedule 6 to, the Criminal Justice Act 1972, which came into force on 30 March 1974.

Section 34(1) of, and schedule 7 to, the act were repealed by section 1 of, and part XI of the schedule to, the Statute Law (Repeals) Act 1974, which came into force on 27 June 1974.

The whole act was repealed by section 23(5) of, and the eighth schedule to, the Nurses, Midwives and Health Visitors Act 1979 (1979 c. 36), which came into operation on 1 July 1983.
