= Midwives Act 1902 =

Act of the Parliament of the United Kingdom

Midwives Act 1902 (Note: Section 19.)
- Act of Parliament
- Parliament of the United Kingdom
- Long title: An Act to secure the better training of Midwives, and to regulate their practice.
- Citation: 2 Edw. 7. c. 17
- Territorial extent: England and Wales (Note: Section 17.)

Dates
- Royal assent: 31 July 1902
- Commencement: 1 April 1903
- Repealed: 1 September 1951
Other legislation
Amended by	Perjury Act 1911; Midwives Act 1918; Midwives and Maternity Homes Act 1926; Local Government Act 1933
Repealed by	Midwives Act 1951

Status: Repealed

Text of statute as originally enacted

The Midwives Act 1902 (2 Edw. 7. c. 17) was an act of the Parliament of the United Kingdom, given royal assent on 31 July 1902, in force from 1 April 1903, and repealed in 1951.

It regulated the profession of midwifery, requiring certification for midwives and providing a penalty for any woman practising midwifery without certification, with the exception of legally qualified medical practitioners or those giving assistance in emergencies. However, it emphasised that this certification was not certification as a "medical practitioner", nor did it give standing under the Medical Acts.

The act established a Central Midwives Board, which would regulate the issue of certificates and keep a central register of midwives, as well as regulating any courses of training or examinations, providing a means for the suspension of practitioners, and generally supervising the effective running of the profession.

Power to supervise midwives on the local level was given to county and borough councils, who were to report any suspected malpractice to the Board, along with the name of any practising midwife convicted of an offence, and generally to keep records of the local practitioners. These powers could be delegated to a district council (or London metropolitan borough councils).

Any woman certified under the act was to notify her local supervisory authority of her intention to practice each year, on penalty of a fine for any failure to submit a notification or any omission of information on it.

Any false representations to obtain a certificate, or any attempts to falsify an entry on the roll of midwives, were a misdemeanour, to be penalised by imprisonment for up to a year with or without hard labour.

The act did not extend to Scotland or to Ireland, and did not in any way apply to qualified medical practitioners. It was repealed by the Midwives Act 1951 (14 & 15 Geo. 6). c. 53), although the board continued to supervise midwifery. In 1983, the Nursing and Midwifery Council took over the duties that the Board had previously executed. Subsequent acts of Parliament regulating midwifery were subsumed by the Health Act 1999, which delegated powers to regulate medical professions to the Secretary of State for Health by statutory instrument or order in council. The rules which govern The Nursing and Midwifery Council are set out in The Nursing and Midwifery Council (Midwives) Rules Order of Council 2012.

== Subsequent developments ==
The whole act was repealed by section 34(1) of, and part I of the second schedule to, the Midwives Act 1951 (14 & 15 Geo. 6. c. 53), which came into force on 1 September 1951.

== See also ==
- Francis Champneys, the physician who championed the act
