= National Health Service (Scotland) Act 1947 =

Act of the Parliament of the United Kingdom

National Health Service (Scotland) Act 1947 (Note: Section 81(1).)
- Act of Parliament
- Parliament of the United Kingdom
- Long title: An Act to provide for the establishment of a comprehensive health service for Scotland, and for purposes connected therewith.
- Citation: 10 & 11 Geo. 6. c. 27
- Territorial extent: Scotland (Note: Section 81(2).)

Dates
- Royal assent: 21 May 1947
- Commencement: 21 May 1947 (in part); 5 July 1948 (rest of act); (Note: Section 80(1).)
- Repealed: 1 January 1979
Other legislation
Amends	National Insurance Act 1911; Cancer Act 1939
Repeals/revokes	Vaccination (Scotland) Act 1907
Amended by	Local Government (Scotland) Act 1947; Local Government Act 1948; National Assistance Act 1948; National Health Service (Amendment) Act 1949; Midwives (Scotland) Act 1951; National Health Service Act 1952; Hospital Endowments (Scotland) Act 1953; Law Reform (Limitation of Actions, etc.) Act 1954; Road Traffic Act 1960; Mental Health (Scotland) Act 1960; National Health Service (Scotland) Act 1972; Health Services Act 1976
Repealed by	National Health Service (Scotland) Act 1978
Relates to	National Health Service Act 1946; National Health Service Act 1951

Status: Repealed

Text of statute as originally enacted

The National Health Service (Scotland) Act 1947 (10 & 11 Geo. 6. c. 27) was an act of the Parliament of the United Kingdom that came into effect on 5 July 1948 and created the National Health Service in Scotland. Though the title 'National Health Service' implies one health service for the United Kingdom, in reality one NHS was created for England and Wales, accountable to the Secretary of State for Health and a separate NHS was created for Scotland, accountable to the Secretary of State for Scotland. Similar health services in Northern Ireland were created by the Northern Ireland Parliament through the Health Services Act (Northern Ireland) 1948 (c. 3 (N.I.)).

== Subsequent developments ==
Many sections of the act were repealed by the National Health Service (Scotland) Act 1972

The whole act was repealed by section 109(b) of, and schedule 17 to, the National Health Service (Scotland) Act 1978, which came into force on 1 January 1979.

== See also ==
- National Health Service Act 1946
