= National Health Service Act 1946 =

Act of the Parliament of the United Kingdom

National Health Service Act 1946 (Note: Section 80(1).)
- Act of Parliament
- Parliament of the United Kingdom
- Long title: An Act to provide for the establishment of a comprehensive health service for England and Wales, and for purposes connected therewith.
- Citation: 9 & 10 Geo. 6. c. 81
- Territorial extent: England and Wales (Note: Section 80(2).)

Dates
- Royal assent: 6 November 1946
- Commencement: 5 July 1948 (Note: Section 79(1).)
- Repealed: 29 August 1977
Other legislation
Amends	Poor Law Amendment Act 1867; Cancer Act 1939
Repeals/revokes	Vaccination Act 1867; Vaccination Act 1871; Vaccination Act 1874; Vaccination Act 1898; Vaccination Act 1907; Notification of Births (Extension) Act 1915; Public Health (Tuberculosis) Act 1921
Amended by	Local Government Act 1948; National Assistance Act 1948; National Health Service (Amendment) Act 1949; Justices of the Peace Act 1949; Adoption Act 1950; Midwives Act 1951; National Health Service Act 1952; Food and Drugs Act 1955; Mental Health Act 1959; Road Traffic Act 1960; Charities Act 1960; Statute Law Revision Act 1963; London Government Act 1963; Science and Technology Act 1965; Health Services Act 1976
Repealed by	National Health Service Act 1977
Relates to	National Health Service Act 1951

Status: Repealed

Text of statute as originally enacted

The National Health Service Act 1946 (9 & 10 Geo. 6. c. 81) was an act of the Parliament of the United Kingdom that came into effect on 5 July 1948 and created the National Health Service in England and Wales thus being the first implementation of the Beveridge model. Though the title 'National Health Service' implies a single health service for the United Kingdom, in reality one NHS was created for England and Wales accountable to the Secretary of State for Health, with a separate NHS created for Scotland accountable to the Secretary of State for Scotland by the passage of the National Health Service (Scotland) Act 1947 (10 & 11 Geo. 6. c. 27). Similar health services in Northern Ireland were created by the Northern Ireland Parliament through the Health Services Act (Northern Ireland) 1948 (c. 3 (N.I.)).

The whole act was repealed by section 129 of, and schedule 16 to, the National Health Service Act 1977 (c. 49), which came into force on 29 August 1977. That act is now superseded by the National Health Service Act 2006 and the Health and Social Care Act 2012.

== Provisions ==
According to section 1(1),

It shall be the duty of the Minister of Health ... to promote the establishment ... of a comprehensive health service designed to secure improvement in the physical and mental health of the people of England and Wales and the prevention, diagnosis and treatment of illness and for that purpose to provide or secure the effective provision of services ...

The act provided for the establishment of a Central Health Services Council with 41 members to advise the minister: the presidents of royal colleges, councillors, and representatives of doctors, dentists, nurses midwives and pharmacists.

Hospital services were the responsibility of the minister. Existing voluntary and local authority hospitals were transferred to the NHS. Regional hospital boards were created on the basis that each region could "conveniently be associated with a university having a school of medicine". Under them were hospital management committees, to manage individual hospitals or groups of hospitals, other than teaching hospitals, which retained their boards of governors.

County councils and county boroughs were designated as local health authorities. They were responsible for providing ambulance services, health centres, and for care, including dental care, of expectant and nursing mothers and of children under five. They had responsibility for the supervision of midwives and the provision of health visitors and community nursing. They were also responsible for vaccination of persons against smallpox, and immunisation against diphtheria and other diseases.

Executive councils were established to supervise general medical and dental services, pharmaceutical services and supplementary ophthalmic services. Provision was made for the establishment of local medical committees, local pharmaceutical committees, ophthalmic services committees and local dental committees to represent the practitioners in each area. The Medical Practices Committee was established to regulate general practitioners. The sale of the goodwill in medical practices was prohibited. The Dental Estimates Board was established

=== Charges ===
Most services were to be free, but there were powers to make charges for:

- Medical appliances of a more expensive type than the prescribed type (and repairs to appliances)
- Privately paying patients
- Care of expectant and nursing mothers and of children under five
- Aftercare and domestic help
- Dental and optical appliances of a more expensive type than the prescribed type
- Replacement or repair of any dental or optical appliances if the need arose from lack of care

=== Mental health ===
The functions of the Board of Control for Lunacy and Mental Deficiency were transferred to the minister.

== See also ==
- History of the welfare state in the United Kingdom
- National Insurance Act 1911
- History of the National Health Service
- National Health Service (Scotland) Act 1947
- National Health Service and Community Care Act 1990
- National Health Service Act 2006
- United Kingdom enterprise law
