= National Insurance (Industrial Injuries) Act 1946 =

Act of the Parliament of the United Kingdom

National Insurance (Industrial Injuries) Act 1946 (Note: Section 91(1).)
- Act of Parliament
- Parliament of the United Kingdom
- Long title: An Act to substitute for the Workmen's Compensation Acts, 1925 to 1945, a system of insurance against personal injury caused by accident arising out of and in the course of a person's employment and against prescribed diseases and injuries due to the nature of a person's employment, and for purposes connected therewith.
- Citation: 9 & 10 Geo. 6. c. 62
- Territorial extent: England and Wales; Scotland; (Note: Section 91(2).)

Dates
- Royal assent: 26 July 1946
- Commencement: 23 January 1948 (Note: Section 88(1). The National Insurance (Industrial Injuries) Act 1946 (Appointed Day) Order 1948 ((SI 1948/53).)
- Repealed: 6 April 1975
Other legislation
| Amends | Workmen’s Compensation Act 1925; Law Reform (Contributory Negligence) Act 1945 |
| Amended by | National Assistance Act 1948; Companies Act 1948; National Insurance (Industrial Injuries) Act 1948; Income Tax Act 1952; Statute Law Revision Act 1953; Wages Councils Act 1959; Police Act 1964; Industrial Injuries and Diseases (Old Cases) Act 1967 |
| Repealed by | Statute Law Revision (Consequential Repeals) Act 1965; Social Security Act 1973; Social Security (Consequential Provisions) Act 1975 |

Status: Repealed

Text of statute as originally enacted

The National Insurance (Industrial Injuries) Act 1946 (9 & 10 Geo. 6. c. 62) was an act of the Parliament of the United Kingdom which provided compensation paid by the Ministry of National Insurance to workers who were left injured or disabled as a result of work-related accidents. The act replaced the Workmen's Compensation Acts.

The act was universal, in the sense that it covered the entire workforce. It provided injury benefit for six months, disability benefit for the permanently injured, and a death benefit for dependents. Tribunals were set up to assess cases rather than the burden of proving a case resting on the claimant, although claims still remained hard to prove.

The act's limitation of the right to appeal was considered in R v Medical Appeal Tribunal, ex p Gilmore where Lord Denning decided that the provision limiting appeal does not mean that the judiciary cannot review decisions.

== Subsequent developments ==
The whole act except sections 6, 71, 89 and 90 and schedule 9, and in section 90, paragraphs (a) to (h), was repealed by section 1(1) of, and the schedule to, the Statute Law Revision (Consequential Repeals) Act 1965, which came into force on 6 September 1965.

The whole act, so far as unrepealed, was repealed by section 1(2) of, and part I of schedule 1 to, the Social Security (Consequential Provisions) Act 1975, which came into force on 6 April 1975.
