= National Health Service (Amendment) Act 1949 =

Act of the Parliament of the United Kingdom

National Health Service (Amendment) Act 1949 (Note: Section 32(1).)
- Act of Parliament
- Parliament of the United Kingdom
- Long title: An Act to amend the National Health Service Act, 1946, and the National Health Service (Scotland) Act, 1947, and otherwise to amend the law in relation to services provided under the said Acts.
- Citation: 12, 13 & 14 Geo. 6. c. 93
- Territorial extent: England and Wales; Scotland; (Note: Section 32(2).)

Dates
- Royal assent: 16 December 1949
- Commencement: 16 December 1949 (Note: The Acts of Parliament (Commencement) Act 1793.)
- Repealed: England and Wales: 1 April 2004
Other legislation
Amends	Cancer Act 1939; National Health Service Act 1946; National Health Service (Scotland) Act 1947
Amended by	Midwives Act 1951; Midwives (Scotland) Act 1951; Mental Health Act 1959; Mental Health (Scotland) Act 1960; National Health Service (Scotland) Act 1978
Repealed by	England and Wales: Health and Social Care (Community Health and Standards) Act 2003

Status: Partially repealed

Text of statute as originally enacted

Revised text of statute as amended

Text of the National Health Service (Amendment) Act 1949 as in force today (including any amendments) within the United Kingdom, from legislation.gov.uk.

The National Health Service (Amendment) Act 1949 (12, 13 & 14 Geo. 6. c. 93) is an act of the Parliament of the United Kingdom. The act safeguarded the independence of GPs, who were allowed to treat private patients. It also proposed prescription charges of not more than 1s. for every National Health Service prescription. However, due to the intense opposition aroused by this proposal, the charges were not implemented till 1952.

The Prime Minister, Clement Attlee, announced on 24 October 1949: "There has been some excessive and unnecessary resort to doctors for prescriptions. This must be checked. A charge not exceeding one shilling, for each prescription will now be imposed. Arrangements will be made to relieve old age pensioners of this charge". The Minister of Health, Aneurin Bevan, told students at University College, London on 15 November: "Now that we have got the National Health Service based on free prescriptions, I shudder to think of the ceaseless cascade of medicine which is pouring down British throats at the present time. I wish I could believe that its efficacy was equal to the credulity with which it is being swallowed".
