= National Health Service Act 1951 =

Act of the Parliament of the United Kingdom

National Health Service Act 1951 (Note: Section 6(1).)
- Act of Parliament
- Parliament of the United Kingdom
- Long title: An Act to authorise the making and recovery of charges in respect of certain dental and optical appliances under the National Health Service Act, 1946, and the National Health Service (Scotland) Act, 1947; to make provision for the accommodation and treatment outside Great Britain of persons suffering from respiratory tuberculosis; to remit stamp duty on receipts given in respect of such charges as aforesaid; and to amend the National Assistance Act, 1948, in relation to requirements for services under the said Acts of 1946 and 1947.
- Citation: 14 & 15 Geo. 6. c. 31
- Territorial extent: England and Wales; Scotland; (Note: Section 6(2).)

Dates
- Royal assent: 10 May 1951
- Commencement: 10 May 1951 (Note: The Acts of Parliament (Commencement) Act 1793.)
- Expired: 1 April 1954 (sections 1, 2 and 4, and the schedule) (Note: Section 5(1).)
- Repealed: England and Wales: 29 August 1977; Scotland: 1 January 1979
Other legislation
Amends	National Assistance Act 1948
Repealed by	England and Wales: National Health Service Act 1977; Scotland: National Health Service (Scotland) Act 1978
Relates to	National Health Service Act 1946; National Health Service (Scotland) Act 1947

Status: Repealed

Text of statute as originally enacted

The National Health Service Act 1951 (14 & 15 Geo. 6. c. 31) was an act of the Parliament of the United Kingdom. It stated that those who received dentures and spectacles from the National Health Service should pay towards their cost. The National Assistance Board was authorised to assist anyone who could demonstrate that they needed help based on national assistance standards.

== Subsequent developments ==
The whole act was repealed for England and Wales by section 129 of, and schedule 16 to, the National Health Service Act 1977, which came into force on 29 August 1977.

The whole act was repealed for Scotland by section 109(b) of, and schedule 17 to, the National Health Service (Scotland) Act 1978, which came into force on 1 January 1979.

== Bibliography ==
- A. Lindsey, Socialized Medicine in England and Wales: The National Health Service, 1948–1961 (Chapel Hill: University of North Carolina Press, 1962).
