= List of acts of the Parliament of the United Kingdom from 1946 =

This is a complete list of acts of the Parliament of the United Kingdom for the year 1946.

Note that the first parliament of the United Kingdom was held in 1801; parliaments between 1707 and 1800 were either parliaments of Great Britain or of Ireland. For acts passed up until 1707, see the list of acts of the Parliament of England and the list of acts of the Parliament of Scotland. For acts passed from 1707 to 1800, see the list of acts of the Parliament of Great Britain. See also the list of acts of the Parliament of Ireland.

For acts of the devolved parliaments and assemblies in the United Kingdom, see the list of acts of the Scottish Parliament, the list of acts of the Northern Ireland Assembly, and the list of acts and measures of Senedd Cymru; see also the list of acts of the Parliament of Northern Ireland.

The number shown after each act's title is its chapter number. Acts passed before 1963 are cited using this number, preceded by the year(s) of the reign during which the relevant parliamentary session was held; thus the Union with Ireland Act 1800 is cited as "39 & 40 Geo. 3. c. 67", meaning the 67th act passed during the session that started in the 39th year of the reign of George III and which finished in the 40th year of that reign. Note that the modern convention is to use Arabic numerals in citations (thus "41 Geo. 3" rather than "41 Geo. III"). Acts of the last session of the Parliament of Great Britain and the first session of the Parliament of the United Kingdom are both cited as "41 Geo. 3". Acts passed from 1963 onwards are simply cited by calendar year and chapter number.

== 9 & 10 Geo. 6 ==
Continuing the first session of the 38th Parliament of the United Kingdom, which met from 1 August 1945 until 6 November 1946.

This session was also traditionally cited as 9 & 10 G. 6.

=== Public general acts ===
Short title	Citation	Royal assent
Long title
Dock Workers (Regulation of Employment) Act 1946 (repealed)	9 & 10 Geo. 6. c. 22	14 February 1946
An Act to make further provision for regulating the employment of dock workers. (Repealed by Dock Work Act 1989 (c. 13))
India (Proclamations of Emergency) Act 1946 (repealed)	9 & 10 Geo. 6. c. 23	14 February 1946
An Act to amend the Government of India Act, 1935, (Note: Government of India Act 1935 (26 Geo. 5 & 1 Edw. 8. c. 2)) as respects the effect of Proclamations of Emergency under section one hundred and two of that Act. (Repealed by Statute Law (Repeals) Act 1976 (c. 16))
Local Government (Financial Provisions) Act 1946 (repealed)	9 & 10 Geo. 6. c. 24	14 February 1946
An Act to provide for the payment out of the Exchequer in respect of three years of grants towards local government expenses supplementary to the General Exchequer Contribution, for the making in certain contingencies of contributions by county councils towards such grants, and for purposes connected therewith. (Repealed by Local Government Act 1948 (11 & 12 Geo. 6. c. 26))
Local Government (Financial Provisions) (Scotland) Act 1946 (repealed)	9 & 10 Geo. 6. c. 25	14 February 1946
An Act to provide for the payment out of moneys provided by Parliament towards local government expenses in Scotland of a further sum in addition to the General Exchequer Contribution payable under section fifty-three of the Local Government (Scotland) Act, 1929, (Note: Local Government (Scotland) Act 1929 (19 & 20 Geo. 5. c. 25)) in respect of each of three years and for the apportionment of such sum among the counties and large burghs of Scotland. (Repealed by Local Government Act 1948 (11 & 12 Geo. 6. c. 26))
Emergency Laws (Transitional Provisions) Act 1946 (repealed)	9 & 10 Geo. 6. c. 26	14 February 1946
An Act to provide for the continuation of certain Defence Regulations during a limited period notwithstanding the expiry of the Emergency Powers (Defence) Acts, 1939 to 1945, and for the extension and amendment of certain enactments the duration or operation of which depends on the duration of the said Acts or of the war; for the permanent enactment of provisions contained in certain Defence Regulations; for establishing the ownership of the Crown of goods requisitioned under emergency powers; for empowering local authorities to remove war works and restore land; for the repeal of certain emergency enactments; and for purposes connected with the matters aforesaid. (Repealed by Statute Law (Repeals) Act 1989 (c. 43))
Bank of England Act 1946	9 & 10 Geo. 6. c. 27	14 February 1946
An Act to bring the capital stock of the Bank of England into public ownership and bring the Bank under public control, to make provision with respect to the relations between the Treasury, the Bank of England and other banks and for purposes connected with the matters aforesaid.
Assurance Companies Act 1946 (repealed)	9 & 10 Geo. 6. c. 28	6 March 1946
An Act to amend the law relating to the carrying on of assurance business. (Repealed for England and Wales and Scotland by Road Traffic Act 1960 (8 & 9 Eliz. 2. c. 16) and for Northern Ireland by Northern Ireland Constitution Act 1973 (c. 36))
Agriculture (Artificial Insemination) Act 1946	9 & 10 Geo. 6. c. 29	6 March 1946
An Act to enable the Minister of Agriculture and Fisheries and the Secretary of State to make contributions and establish centres for the purposes of research as to the practice of artificial insemination of livestock; to provide for the payment of grants out of moneys provided by Parliament in respect of initial losses incurred in the operation of certain centres for the artificial insemination of cattle; and for purposes connected therewith.
Trunk Roads Act 1946 (repealed)	9 & 10 Geo. 6. c. 30	6 March 1946
An Act to amend the law relating to Trunk Roads; and for purposes connected therewith. (Repealed by Statute Law (Repeals) Act 1989 (c. 43))
Ministers of the Crown (Transfer of Functions) Act 1946 (repealed)	9 & 10 Geo. 6. c. 31	6 March 1946
An Act to facilitate the redistribution of functions between Ministers of the Crown, and the alteration of the style and title of such Ministers; and to make further provision with respect to the Minister of Food, the Minister of Labour and National Service, the Minister of Transport and the Secretary of the Department of Overseas Trade. (Repealed for Northern Ireland by Northern Ireland Crown Proceedings Order 1949 (SI 1949/1836) and for England and Wales and Scotland by Crown Proceedings Act 1947 (10 & 11 Geo. 6. c. 44), Transfer of Functions (Ministry of Food) Order 1955 (SI 1955/554), Statute Law Revision Act 1963 (c. 30), Ministerial Salaries and Members' Pensions Act 1965 (c. 11), ? (SI 1969/1970) and Ministers of the Crown Act 1975 (c. 26))
Agricultural Development (Ploughing Up of Land) Act 1946 (repealed)	9 & 10 Geo. 6. c. 32	6 March 1946
An Act to reduce the period for which land must have been under grass in order that a ploughing grant may be made in respect thereof. (Repealed by Statute Law Revision Act 1953 (2 & 3 Eliz. 2. c. 5))
Consolidated Fund (No. 1) Act 1946 (repealed)	9 & 10 Geo. 6. c. 33	26 March 1946
An Act to apply certain sums out of the Consolidated Fund to the service of the years ending on the thirty-first day of March, one thousand nine hundred and forty-six and one thousand nine hundred and forty-seven. (Repealed by Statute Law Revision Act 1950 (14 Geo. 6. c. 6))
Furnished Houses (Rent Control) Act 1946 (repealed)	9 & 10 Geo. 6. c. 34	26 March 1946
An Act to make provision with respect to the rent of houses or parts thereof let at a rent which includes payment for the use of furniture or for services. (Repealed by Rent Act 1968 (c. 23))
Building Restrictions (War-Time Contraventions) Act 1946 (repealed)	9 & 10 Geo. 6. c. 35	26 March 1946
An Act to make provision as respects works on land carried out during the war period, and uses of land begun during that period, which do not comply with building laws or planning control. (Repealed for England and Wales by Planning (Consequential Provisions) Act 1990 (c. 11) and for Scotland by Planning (Consequential Provisions) (Scotland) Act 1997 (c. 11))
Statutory Instruments Act 1946	9 & 10 Geo. 6. c. 36	26 March 1946
An Act to repeal the Rules Publication Act, 1893, (Note: Rules Publication Act 1893 (56 & 57 Vict. c. 66)) and to make further provision as to the instruments by which statutory powers to make orders, rules, regulations and other subordinate legislation are exercised.
Straits Settlements (Repeal) Act 1946 (repealed)	9 & 10 Geo. 6. c. 37	26 March 1946
An Act to repeal the Straits Settlements Act, 1866, (Note: Straits Settlements Act 1866 (29 & 30 Vict. c. 115)) and to make further provision for the government of the territories heretofore known as the Straits Settlements. (Repealed by Malaysia Act 1963 (c. 35))
National Service (Release of Conscientious Objectors) Act 1946 (repealed)	9 & 10 Geo. 6. c. 38	26 March 1946
An Act to enable conscientious objectors conditionally registered under the National Service Acts, 1939 to 1942, to be released, before the date on which the present emergency is deemed to end for the purposes of those Acts, from the condition subject to which they were registered. (Repealed by Statute Law Revision Act 1963 (c. 30))
India (Central Government and Legislature) Act 1946 (repealed)	9 & 10 Geo. 6. c. 39	26 March 1946
An Act to amend the Government of India Act, 1935, with respect to the qualifications of members of the Governor-General's Executive Council, to extend temporarily the powers of the Indian Legislature to make laws, to amend subsection (4) of section one hundred and two of the said Act as to the effect of laws passed by virtue of a Proclamation of Emergency, and for purposes connected with the matters aforesaid. (Repealed by Statute Law (Repeals) Act 1976 (c. 16))
Miscellaneous Financial Provisions Act 1946	9 & 10 Geo. 6. c. 40	26 March 1946
An Act to extend the powers of the Treasury to raise money under section one of the National Loans Act, 1939, (Note: National Loans Act 1939 (2 & 3 Geo. 6. c. 117)) to make provision as to certain obligations arising out of or in connection with the war, to charge certain payments under the War Damage Act, 1943, (Note: War Damage Act 1943 (6 & 7 Geo. 6. c. 21)) on the Consolidated Fund, to provide for a temporary increase in the capital of the Civil Contingencies Fund, to amend the Defence Loans Act, 1937, (Note: Defence Loans Act 1937 (1 Edw. 8 & 1 Geo. 6. c. 13)) and to increase the salary of the Comptroller and Auditor-General.
Public Works Loans Act 1946 (repealed)	9 & 10 Geo. 6. c. 41	26 March 1946
An Act to make further provision as to the appointment of the Public Works Loan Commissioners, to grant money for the purpose of certain local loans out of the Local Loans Fund and for other purposes relating to local loans. (Repealed by Public Bodies (Abolition of Public Works Loan Commissioners) Order 2020 (SI 2020/176))
Water (Scotland) Act 1946 (repealed)	9 & 10 Geo. 6. c. 42	26 March 1946
An Act to make provision for the conservation of water resources and for water supplies in Scotland and for purposes connected therewith. (Repealed by Water (Scotland) Act 1980 (c. 45))
Camberwell, Bristol and Nottingham Elections (Validation) Act 1946 (repealed)	9 & 10 Geo. 6. c. 43	26 March 1946
An Act to validate the election of Mrs. Freda Künzlen Corbet, Stanley Stephen Awbery Esquire, and James Harrison Esquire, to the House of Commons notwithstanding their holding certain offices, and to indemnify them from any penal consequences which they may have incurred by sitting and voting as members of that House. (Repealed by Representation of the People Act 1969 (c. 15))
Patents and Designs Act 1946 (repealed)	9 & 10 Geo. 6. c. 44	15 April 1946
An Act to amend the Patents and Designs Acts, 1907 to 1942, and the Patents, Designs, Copyright and Trade Marks (Emergency) Act, 1939, (Note: Patents, Designs, Copyright and Trade Marks (Emergency) Act 1939 (2 & 3 Geo. 6. c. 107)) in respect of matters arising out of hostilities or the communication of inventions and designs in accordance with agreements or arrangements with other countries. (Repealed by Statute Law (Repeals) Act 1986 (c. 12))
United Nations Act 1946	9 & 10 Geo. 6. c. 45	15 April 1946
An Act to enable effect to be given to certain provisions of the Charter of the United Nations.
Police Act 1946 (repealed)	9 & 10 Geo. 6. c. 46	15 April 1946
An Act to abolish non-county boroughs as separate police areas; to provide for the amalgamation of county and county borough police areas; to provide for the purchase of land for police purposes by compulsory purchase order; to redefine the Metropolitan Police District; and for purposes connected with the matters aforesaid. (Repealed by Police Act 1964 (c. 48))
Army and Air Force (Annual) Act 1946 (repealed)	9 & 10 Geo. 6. c. 47	18 April 1946
An Act to provide, during twelve months, for the discipline and regulation of the Army and the Air Force. (Repealed by Statute Law Revision Act 1950 (14 Geo. 6. c. 6), Statute Law Revision Act 1953 (2 & 3 Eliz. 2. c. 5) and Revision of the Army and Air Force Acts (Transitional Provisions) Act 1955 (3 & 4 Eliz. 2. c. 20))
Housing (Financial and Miscellaneous Provisions) Act 1946 (repealed)	9 & 10 Geo. 6. c. 48	18 April 1946
An Act to make fresh arrangements for the making of contributions grants and loans in connection with the provision of housing accommodation; to provide for matters subordinate to that purpose; to amend the enactments which relate to the making of contributions in respect of housing accommodation; to amend the law relating to the housing accounts of local authorities; and to facilitate the provision of housing accommodation in the Isles of Scilly. (Repealed by Housing Finance Act 1972 (c. 47))
Acquisition of Land (Authorisation Procedure) Act 1946	9 & 10 Geo. 6. c. 49	18 April 1946
An Act to amend the law as to the authorisation of the compulsory purchase of land for purposes for which the purchasing authority has power to purchase land compulsorily under existing enactments; to make temporary provision as to the procedure for the compulsory purchase of land as aforesaid in urgent cases, to provide for notifying purchases of war-damaged land to the War Damage Commission; and for purposes connected with the matters aforesaid.
Education Act 1946 (repealed)	9 & 10 Geo. 6. c. 50	22 May 1946
An Act to amend and supplement the law relating to education, and to amend the law relating to the execution of the Public Libraries Acts, 1892 to 1919. (Repealed by Education Act 1996 (c. 56))
Post Office and Telegraph (Money) Act 1946 (repealed)	9 & 10 Geo. 6. c. 51	22 May 1946
An Act to provide for raising further money for the development of the postal, telegraphic and telephonic systems and the repayment to the Post Office Fund of money applied thereout for such development. (Repealed by Post Office Act 1961 (9 & 10 Eliz. 2. c. 15))
Trade Disputes and Trade Unions Act 1946 (repealed)	9 & 10 Geo. 6. c. 52	22 May 1946
An Act to repeal the Trade Disputes and Trade Unions Act, 1927, (Note: Trade Disputes and Trade Unions Act 1927 (17 & 18 Geo. 5. c. 22)) and to restore all enactments and rules of law thereby affected. (Repealed by Trade Union and Labour Relations (Consolidation) Act 1992 (c. 52))
Licensing Planning (Temporary Provisions) Act 1946 (repealed)	9 & 10 Geo. 6. c. 53	6 June 1946
An Act to enable parts of licensing districts to be included, in certain cases, in licensing planning areas constituted under the Licensing Planning (Temporary Provisions) Act, 1945; (Note: Licensing Planning (Temporary Provisions) Act 1945 (8 & 9 Geo. 6. c. 15)) and to make further provision as to licensing planning committees under the said Act and sub-committees thereof. (Repealed by Licensing Act 1953 (1 & 2 Eliz. 2. c. 46))
Housing (Financial Provisions) (Scotland) Act 1946	9 & 10 Geo. 6. c. 54	6 June 1946
An Act to make fresh provision for the making of contributions out of the Exchequer and by local authorities in respect of housing accommodation provided for the working classes in Scotland and for the making of payments and advances to the housing association approved for the purposes of section two of the Housing (Financial Provisions) (Scotland) Act, 1938; (Note: Housing (Financial Provisions) (Scotland) Act 1938 (2 & 3 Geo. 6. c. 3)) to amend Part II of the Housing (Agricultural Population) (Scotland) Act, 1938; (Note: Housing (Agricultural Population) (Scotland) Act 1938 (1 & 2 Geo. 6. c. 38)) to amend the provisions of the Housing (Scotland) Acts, 1925 to 1944, relating to the making of contributions in respect of housing accommodation, to housing accounts, and to the disposal of land; to enable county councils to provide housing accommodation outside their districts; and for purposes connected with the matters aforesaid.
Ministerial Salaries Act 1946 (repealed)	9 & 10 Geo. 6. c. 55	6 June 1946
An Act to make further provision as to the salaries of certain Ministers of the Crown and other persons, and as to the payment of salaries or allowances as Members of Parliament to persons in receipt of salaries or pensions under the Ministers of the Crown Act, 1937. (Note: Ministers of the Crown Act 1937 (1 Edw. 8. & 1 Geo. 6. c. 38)) (Repealed by Ministerial Salaries Consolidation Act 1965 (c. 58))
British Museum Act 1946 (repealed)	9 & 10 Geo. 6. c. 56	6 June 1946
An Act to enable the Trustees of the British Museum to lend the Lacock Abbey Magna Carta, for a period not exceeding two years, for public exhibition in the Library of Congress of the United States of America. (Repealed by Statute Law Revision Act 1959 (7 & 8 Eliz. 2. c. 68))
Burma Legislature Act 1946 (repealed)	9 & 10 Geo. 6. c. 57	12 July 1946
An Act to amend the law relating to the Burma Legislature (including the law relating to the franchise in Burma). (Repealed by Burma Independence Act 1947 (11 & 12 Geo. 6. c. 3))
Borrowing (Control and Guarantees) Act 1946 (repealed)	9 & 10 Geo. 6. c. 58	12 July 1946
An Act to provide for the regulation of the borrowing and raising of money, the issue of securities, and the circulation of offers of securities for subscription, sale or exchange, to enable the Treasury to guarantee loans in certain circumstances, and for purposes connected with the matters aforesaid. (Repealed by Government Trading Act 1990 (c. 30))
Coal Industry Nationalisation Act 1946	9 & 10 Geo. 6. c. 59	12 July 1946
An Act to establish public ownership and control of the coal-mining industry and certain allied activities; and for purposes connected therewith.
Superannuation Act 1946 (repealed)	9 & 10 Geo. 6. c. 60	26 July 1946
An Act to amend the Superannuation Acts; and to make further provision as to persons employed in the civil service of the State whose superannuation benefits are regulated under the enactments relating to teachers or to officers and servants of local authorities, or under certain approved schemes. (Repealed by Superannuation Act 1965 (c. 74) and Pensions (Increase) Act 1965 (c. 78) and Teachers' Superannuation Act 1965 (c. 83))
Railways (Valuation for Rating) Act 1946 (repealed)	9 & 10 Geo. 6. c. 61	26 July 1946
An Act to amend the Railways (Valuation for Rating) Act, 1930. (Note: Railways (Valuation for Rating) Act 1930 (20 & 21 Geo. 5. c. 24)) (Repealed by Local Government Act 1948 (11 & 12 Geo. 6. c. 26))
National Insurance (Industrial Injuries) Act 1946 (repealed)	9 & 10 Geo. 6. c. 62	26 July 1946
An Act to substitute for the Workmen's Compensation Acts, 1925 to 1945, a system of insurance against personal injury caused by accident arising out of and in the course of a person's employment and against prescribed diseases and injuries due to the nature of a person's employment, and for purposes connected therewith. (Repealed by Statute Law Revision (Consequential Repeals) Act 1965 (c. 55), Social Security Act 1973 (c. 38) and Social Security (Consequential Provisions) Act 1975 (c. 18))
British North America Act 1946	9 & 10 Geo. 6. c. 63	26 July 1946
An Act to provide for the readjustment of representation in the House of Commons of Canada on the basis of the population of Canada.
Finance Act 1946	9 & 10 Geo. 6. c. 64	1 August 1946
An Act to grant certain duties, to alter other duties, and to amend the law relating to the Public Revenue and the National Debt, and to make further provision in connection with Finance.
Appropriation Act 1946 (repealed)	9 & 10 Geo. 6. c. 65	1 August 1946
An Act to apply certain sums out of the Consolidated Fund to the service of the years ending on the thirty-first day of March, one thousand nine hundred and forty-five and one thousand nine hundred and forty-seven, and to appropriate the Supplies granted in this Session of Parliament. (Repealed by Statute Law Revision Act 1950 (14 Geo. 6. c. 6))
Diplomatic Privileges (Extension) Act 1946 (repealed)	9 & 10 Geo. 6. c. 66	1 August 1946
An Act to amend the Diplomatic Privileges (Extension) Act, 1944, (Note: Diplomatic Privileges (Extension) Act 1944 (7 & 8 Geo. 6. c. 44)) in connection with the general convention on privileges and immunities of the United Nations approved at the first General Assembly thereof and in connection with certain resolutions taken at the said Assembly. (Repealed by International Organisations (Immunities and Privileges) Act 1950 (14 Geo. 6. c. 14))
National Insurance Act 1946 (repealed)	9 & 10 Geo. 6. c. 67	1 August 1946
An Act to establish an extended system of national insurance providing pecuniary payments by way of unemployment benefit, sickness benefit, maternity benefit, retirement pension, widows' benefit, guardian's allowance and death grant, to repeal or amend the existing enactments relating to unemployment insurance, national health insurance, widows', orphans' and old age contributory pensions and non-contributory old age pensions, to provide for the making of payments towards the cost of a national health service, and for purposes connected with the matters aforesaid. (Repealed by Statute Law Revision (Consequential Repeals) Act 1965 (c. 55) and Social Security Act 1973 (c. 38))
New Towns Act 1946 (repealed)	9 & 10 Geo. 6. c. 68	1 August 1946
An Act to provide for the creation of new towns by means of development corporations, and for purposes connected therewith. (Repealed for England and Wales by New Towns Act 1965 (c. 59) and for Scotland by New Towns (Scotland) Act 1968 (c. 16))
Isle of Man (Customs) Act 1946 (repealed)	9 & 10 Geo. 6. c. 69	1 August 1946
An Act to amend the law with respect to customs in the Isle of Man. (Repealed for the Isle of Man by Customs and Excise etc. Order 1976 (GC No 1/76))
Civil Aviation Act 1946 (repealed)	9 & 10 Geo. 6. c. 70	1 August 1946
An Act to make further provision with respect to civil aviation and matters connected therewith, and, in particular, to secure the development of air transport services by corporations operating under public control. (Repealed by Civil Aviation Act 1949 (12, 13 & 14 Geo. 6. c. 67) and Air Corporations Act 1949 (12, 13 & 14 Geo. 6. c. 91))
Police (Scotland) Act 1946 (repealed)	9 & 10 Geo. 6. c. 71	6 November 1946
An Act to provide for the amalgamation of police forces in Scotland; to provide for the payment out of moneys provided by Parliament of grants towards police expenditure in Scotland; to amend the law relating to the provision of buildings and acquisition of land in Scotland for police purposes; and for purposes connected with the matters aforesaid. (Repealed by Police (Scotland) Act 1956 (4 & 5 Eliz. 2. c. 26))
Education (Scotland) Act 1946 (repealed)	9 & 10 Geo. 6. c. 72	6 November 1946
An Act to consolidate the enactments relating to education in Scotland. (Repealed by National Health Service (Scotland) Act 1947 (10 & 11 Geo. 6. c. 27), Acquisition of Land (Authorisation Procedure) (Scotland) Act 1947 (10 & 11 Geo. 6. c. 42), Local Government (Scotland) Act 1947 (10 & 11 Geo. 6. c. 43), Employment and Training Act 1948 (11 & 12 Geo. 6. c. 46), Education (Scotland) Act 1949 (12, 13 & 14 Geo. 6. c. 19), Criminal Justice (Scotland) Act 1949 (12, 13 & 14 Geo. 6. c. 94), Statute Law Revision Act 1950 (14 Geo. 6. c. 6), Teachers (Superannuation) Act 1956 (4 & 5 Eliz. 2. c. 53), Education (Scotland) Act 1956 (4 & 5 Eliz. 2. c. 75), Local Government and Miscellaneous Financial Provisions (Scotland) Act 1958 (6 & 7 Eliz. 2. c. 64), Mental Health Act 1959 (7 & 8 Eliz. 2. c. 72), Mental Health (Scotland) Act 1960 (8 & 9 Eliz. 2. c. 61), Public Bodies (Admission to Meetings) Act 1960 (8 & 9 Eliz. 2. c. 67), Local Government (Financial Provisions etc.) (Scotland) Act 1962 (10 & 11 Eliz. 2. c. 9) and Education (Scotland) Act 1962 (10 & 11 Eliz. 2. c. 47))
Hill Farming Act 1946	9 & 10 Geo. 6. c. 73	6 November 1946
An Act to make provision for promoting the rehabilitation of hill farming land; for the payment of subsidies in respect of hill sheep and hill cattle, for controlling the keeping of rams and ram lambs; for regulating the burning of heather and grass; for amending the law as to the valuation of sheep stocks in Scotland; and for purposes connected with the matters aforesaid.
Coinage Act 1946 (repealed)	9 & 10 Geo. 6. c. 74	6 November 1946
An Act to provide for a coinage other than silver to be legal tender for payments up to forty shillings, and for consequential amendments of enactments relating to silver coin; to amend the law as to the fineness of silver coins of the King's Maundy monies; and to confer further powers as to the purchase of metal for coinage. (Repealed by Coinage Act 1971 (c. 24))
Public Works Loans (No. 2) Act 1946 (repealed)	9 & 10 Geo. 6. c. 75	6 November 1946
An Act to grant money for the purpose of certain local loans out of the Local Loans Fund; to make provision as to the Public Works Loan Commissioners' entering into undertakings to grant loans; and to repeal the provisions of section ninety-two of the Housing Act, 1936, (Note: Housing Act 1936 (26 Geo. 5 & 1 Edw. 8. c. 51)) and of section seventy-three of the Housing (Scotland) Act, 1925, (Note: Housing (Scotland) Act 1925 (15 & 16 Geo. 5. c. 15)) as to the minimum rate of interest therein mentioned. (Repealed by National Loans Act 1968 (c. 13))
Unemployment Insurance (Eire Volunteers) Act 1946 (repealed)	9 & 10 Geo. 6. c. 76	6 November 1946
An Act to empower the Minister of National Insurance to give effect to arrangements for paying unemployment benefit to persons ordinarily resident in Eire who have served in His Majesty's forces; and for purposes connected with the matters aforesaid. (Repealed by Family Allowances and National Insurance Act 1961 (10 & 11 Eliz. 2. c. 6))
Association of County Councils (Scotland) Act 1946 (repealed)	9 & 10 Geo. 6. c. 77	6 November 1946
An Act to amend the law with regard to contributions by county councils to the Association of County Councils in Scotland and the payment of expenses incurred by members of county councils in attendance at meetings of that Association or of committees or sub-committees thereof: and to make provision with regard to the superannuation of the officers of that Association and of persons in their employment. (Repealed by Local Government (Scotland) Act 1973 (c. 65))
Supreme Court of Judicature (Circuit Officers) Act 1946 (repealed)	9 & 10 Geo. 6. c. 78	6 November 1946
An Act to amend the law relating to clerks of assize and certain other circuit offices. (Repealed by Courts Act 1971 (c. 23))
Public Notaries (War Service of Articled Clerks) Act 1946 (repealed)	9 & 10 Geo. 6. c. 79	6 November 1946
An Act to modify the requirements of the enactments relating to public notaries with respect to articled clerks who have been engaged in war service. (Repealed by Statute Law (Repeals) Act 1971 (c. 52))
Atomic Energy Act 1946	9 & 10 Geo. 6. c. 80	6 November 1946
An Act to provide for the development of atomic energy and the control of such development and for purposes connected therewith.
National Health Service Act 1946 (repealed)	9 & 10 Geo. 6. c. 81	6 November 1946
An Act to provide for the establishment of a comprehensive health service for England and Wales, and for purposes connected therewith. (Repealed by National Health Service Act 1977 (c. 49))
Cable and Wireless Act 1946	9 & 10 Geo. 6. c. 82	6 November 1946
An Act to bring the share capital of Cable and Wireless Limited into public ownership, to provide for the cast of making certain payments to that company in connection with reductions in its charges and for purposes connected with the matters aforesaid.
Roosevelt Memorial Act 1946	9 & 10 Geo. 6. c. 83	6 November 1946
An Act to provide for the erection in Grosvenor Square, in the City of Westminster, of a statue of Franklin Delano Roosevelt, the laying out of the Square as a garden and its opening for the use and enjoyment of the public in perpetuity; and for purposes connected with the matters aforesaid.

=== Local acts ===
Short title	Citation	Royal assent
Long title
Ministry of Health Provisional Order Confirmation (Mortlake Crematorium Board) Act 1946 (repealed)	9 & 10 Geo. 6. c. xv	26 March 1946
An Act to confirm a Provisional Order of the Minister of Health relating to the Mortlake Crematorium Board. (Repealed by London Government Order 1965 (SI 1965/654))
	Mortlake Crematorium Order 1945 (Note: Although passed in 1946, the short title is specified as the Mortlake Crematorium Order 1945.) Provisional Order altering a local act. (Note: Mortlake Crematorium Act 1936 (26 Geo. 5 & 1 Edw. 8. c. cxxi))	
Inverness Water Order Confirmation Act 1946	9 & 10 Geo. 6. c. xvi	15 April 1946
An Act to make a Provisional Order under the Private Legislation Procedure (Scotland) Act 1936 (Note: Private Legislation Procedure (Scotland) Act 1936 (26 Geo. 5 & 1 Edw. 8. c. 52)) relating to Inverness Water.
	Inverness Water Order 1946 Provisional Order.—To authorise the town council of Inverness to construct additional waterworks to acquire lands to confer further powers on the town council in connection with their water undertaking to borrow further money and for other purposes.	
Metropolitan Water Board Act 1946	9 & 10 Geo. 6. c. xvii	15 April 1946
An Act to empower the Metropolitan Water Board to execute works and to acquire lands and for other purposes.
London Necropolis Act 1946	9 & 10 Geo. 6. c. xviii	15 April 1946
An Act to confer further powers upon the London Necropolis Company Limited and for other purposes.
North West Midlands Joint Electricity Authority Order Confirmation Act 1946	9 & 10 Geo. 6. c. xix	22 May 1946
An Act to confirm a Provisional Order made under section one of the Electricity (Supply) Act 1922 (Note: Electricity (Supply) Act 1922 (12 & 13 Geo. 5. c. 46)) relating to the North West Midlands Joint Electricity Authority.
	North West Midlands Joint Electricity Authority (Increase of Borrowing Powers) Order 1946 Provisional Order made by the Electricity Commissioners and confirmed by the Minister of Fuel and Power under the Electricity (Supply) Acts 1882 to 1936 for increasing the borrowing powers of the North West Midlands Joint Electricity Authority.	
Bucks Water Board Act 1946	9 & 10 Geo. 6. c. xx	22 May 1946
An Act to provide for the transfer to the Bucks Water Board of the undertaking of the Chiltern Hills Spring Water Company to extend the limits within which the Board may supply water and for other purposes.
Newport (Isle of Wight) Corporation Act 1946	9 & 10 Geo. 6. c. xxi	22 May 1946
An Act to provide for the transfer to the mayor aldermen and burgesses of the borough of Newport (Isle of Wight) of the undertaking of the Newport (Isle of Wight) Gas Company to confer further powers upon that Corporation with regard to their gas and other undertakings and to make further provision with regard to the health local government improvement and finance of the said borough and for other purposes.
Astley Ainslie Hospital Order Confirmation Act 1946	9 & 10 Geo. 6. c. xxii	6 June 1946
An Act to make a Provisional Order under the Private Legislation Procedure (Scotland) Act 1936 relating to Astley Ainslie Hospital.
	Astley Ainslie Hospital Order 1946 Provisional Order to confer powers on the Governors of the Astley Ainslie Institution and for other purposes.	
London, Midland and Scottish Railway Order Confirmation Act 1946	9 & 10 Geo. 6. c. xxiii	6 June 1946
An Act to make a Provisional Order under the Private Legislation Procedure (Scotland) Act 1936 relating to the London Midland and Scottish Railway.
	London, Midland and Scottish Railway Order 1946 Provisional Order to empower the London Midland and Scottish Railway Company to construct a railway and to acquire lands and for other purposes.	
Great Western Railway Act 1946	9 & 10 Geo. 6. c. xxiv	6 June 1946
An Act to empower the Great Western Railway Company to construct a railway and to acquire land in the county of Glamorgan and for other purposes.
Dundee Corporation Order Confirmation Act 1946 (repealed)	9 & 10 Geo. 6. c. xxv	12 July 1946
An Act to make a Provisional Order under the Private Legislation Procedure (Scotland) Act 1936 relating to Dundee Corporation. (Repealed by Dundee Corporation (Consolidated Powers) Order Confirmation Act 1957 (6 & 7 Eliz. 2. c. iv))
	Dundee Corporation Order 1496 Provisional Order to extend the boundaries of the city and royal burgh of Dundee to authorise the Corporation to acquire lands and construct waterworks and to extend the limits of supply and the compulsory water supply limits of the Corporation respectively to confer powers on the Corporation with respect to their Camperdown Estate to extend and redefine the gas supply limits of the Corporation to authorise the Corporation to borrow further moneys and for other purposes.	
Glasgow Corporation Order Confirmation Act 1946	9 & 10 Geo. 6. c. xxvi	12 July 1946
An Act to make a Provisional Order under the Private Legislation Procedure (Scotland) Act 1936 relating to Glasgow Corporation.
	Glasgow Corporation Order 1946 Provisional Order to authorise the Corporation of the city of Glasgow to borrow money for their water and gas undertakings to extend the time for the construction of waterworks to confer further police powers on the Corporation and for other purposes.	
Newcastle-upon-Tyne Corporation Act 1946 (repealed)	9 & 10 Geo. 6. c. xxvii	12 July 1946
An Act to empower the lord mayor aldermen and citizens of the city and county of Newcastle-upon-Tyne to provide trolley vehicle services in the said city and elsewhere to authorise the Corporation to construct a new road and for other purposes. (Repealed by Tyne and Wear Act 1980 (c. xliii))
Mid and South East Cheshire Water Board Act 1946	9 & 10 Geo. 6. c. xxviii	12 July 1946
An Act to constitute a Joint Board consisting of representatives of the County Council of the Administrative County of the County Palatine of Chester, the Mayor Aldermen and Burgesses of the Borough of Crewe, the Urban District Councils of Middlewich, Nantwich, Northwich, Sandbach and Winsford, and the Rural District Councils of Congleton, Nantwich and Northwich; to vest in the said Board the water undertakings of the constituent authorities; to authorise the Board to supply water; and for other purposes.
City of London (Various Powers) Act 1946	9 & 10 Geo. 6. c. xxix	12 July 1946
An Act to make temporary provision with respect to ward elections in war-damaged wards in the city of London and for other purposes.
London County Council (Money) Act 1946 (repealed)	9 & 10 Geo. 6. c. xxx	12 July 1946
An Act to regulate the expenditure on capital account and lending of money by the London County Council during the financial period from the first day of April one thousand nine hundred and forty-six to the thirtieth day of September one thousand nine hundred and forty-seven and for other purposes. (Repealed by London County Council (Loans) Act 1955 (4 & 5 Eliz. 2. c. xxvi))
Rushden District Gas Act 1946	9 & 10 Geo. 6. c. xxxi	12 July 1946
An Act to provide for the transfer to the Rushden and Higham Ferrers District Gas Company of the undertaking of the Raunds Gas Light and Coke Company Limited to authorise the Rushden and Higham Ferrers District Gas Company to raise additional money to confer further powers upon and to change the name of that company and for other purposes.
Breconshire County Council Act 1946	9 & 10 Geo. 6. c. xxxii	12 July 1946
An Act to provide for the vesting in the Breconshire County Council of part of the Swansea Canal and other lands and for the closing of the part of the canal so vested to confer powers on the County Council with respect to that part of the canal and those lands and for other purposes.
London, Midland and Scottish Railway Act 1946	9 & 10 Geo. 6. c. xxxiii	12 July 1946
An Act to empower the London Midland and Scottish Railway Company to construct works and to acquire lands and for other purposes.
Ministry of Health Provisional Order Confirmation (Wallasey) Act 1946 (repealed)	9 & 10 Geo. 6. c. xxxiv	26 July 1946
An Act to Confirm a Provisional Order of the Minister of Health relating to the county borough of Wallasey. (Repealed by County of Merseyside Act 1980 (c. x))
	Wallasey Order 1946 Provisional Order to enable the council of the county borough of Wallasey to purchase certain lands compulsorily.	
West Midlands Joint Electricity Authority Order Confirmation Act 1946	9 & 10 Geo. 6. c. xxxv	26 July 1946
An Act to confirm a Provisional Order made under section one of the Electricity (Supply) Act 1922 relating to the West Midlands Joint Electricity Authority.
	West Midlands Joint Electricity Authority (Increase of Borrowing Powers) Order 1946 Provisional Order made by the Electricity Commissioners and confirmed by the Minister of Fuel and Power under the Electricity (Supply) Acts 1882 to 1936 for increasing the borrowing powers of the West Midlands Joint Electricity Authority.	
Pier and Harbour Order (Skegness) Confirmation Act 1946	9 & 10 Geo. 6. c. xxxvi	26 July 1946
An Act to confirm a Provisional Order made by the Minister of Transport under the General Pier and Harbour Act 1861 (Note: General Pier and Harbour Act 1861 (24 & 25 Vict. c. 45)) relating to Skegness.
	Skegness Pier Order 1946 Provisional Order authorising the increase of certain of the maximum rates tolls and charges leviable by the Skegness Pier Company Limited and for other purposes.	
Gas Light and Coke Company's Act 1946	9 & 10 Geo. 6. c. xxxvii	26 July 1946
An Act to amend enactments relating to the method of charging for gas supplied by the Gas Light and Coke Company and for other purposes.
Manchester Corporation Act 1946	9 & 10 Geo. 6. c. xxxviii	26 July 1946
An Act to extend the time for the construction of waterworks by the lord mayor aldermen and citizens of the city of Manchester to confer further powers upon them in reference to their water undertaking and the provision of trolley vehicles to authorise the supply of heat by means of hot water and steam and to make further provision in reference to the transfer of stock superannuation allowances and the health local government and improvement of the city and for other purposes.
Portsmouth Corporation Act 1946	9 & 10 Geo. 6. c. xxxix	26 July 1946
An Act to authorise agreements between the Portsmouth Corporation and Southdown Motor Services Limited for the provision and working in co-ordination of passenger road transport by the said Corporation and the said company to empower the said Corporation to borrow money and for other purposes.
Tyne Tunnel Act 1946	9 & 10 Geo. 6. c. xl	26 July 1946
An Act to authorise the construction of tunnels for vehicular and pedestrian traffic under the river Tyne between Wallsend in the county of Northumberland and Jarrow in the county of Durham and approaches to such tunnels and for other purposes.
Caledonian Insurance Company's Act 1946	9 & 10 Geo. 6. c. xli	26 July 1946
An Act for conferring further powers on the Caledonian Insurance Company and for other purposes.
Moorfields, Westminster and Central Eye Hospital Act 1946	9 & 10 Geo. 6. c. xlii	26 July 1946
An Act to amalgamate the Royal London Ophthalmic Hospital the Royal Westminster Ophthalmic Hospital and the Central London Ophthalmic Hospital to make provision with respect to the property and funds of the said hospitals to incorporate the governing body of the amalgamated hospitals and for other purposes.
West Sussex County Council Act 1946	9 & 10 Geo. 6. c. xliii	26 July 1946
An Act to confer further powers on the county council of the administrative county of West Sussex with respect to the acquisition and user of lands the stopping up and diversion of highways and the sale of coke and for other purposes.
Campbeltown Water, &c. Order Confirmation Act 1946	9 & 10 Geo. 6. c. xliv	1 August 1946
An Act to make a Provisional Order under the Private Legislation Procedure (Scotland) Act 1936 relating to Campbeltown Water, &c.
	Campbeltown Water, &c. Order 1946	
Derby Corporation (Trolley Vehicles) Order Confirmation Act 1946	9 & 10 Geo. 6. c. xlv	1 August 1946
An Act to confirm a Provisional Order made by the Minister of Transport under the Derby Corporation Act 1930 (Note: Derby Corporation Act 1930 (20 & 21 Geo. 5. c. lxvi)) relating to Derby Corporation trolley vehicles.
	Derby Corporation (Trolley Vehicles) Order 1946 Order authorising the mayor aldermen and burgesses of the borough of Derby to use trolley vehicles upon additional routes in the borough of Derby and the rural district of Belper.	
Ipswich Corporation (Trolley Vehicles) Order Confirmation Act 1946	9 & 10 Geo. 6. c. xlvi	1 August 1946
An Act to confirm a Provisional Order made by the Minister of Transport under the Ipswich Corporation Act 1925 (Note: Ipswich Corporation Act 1925 (15 & 16 Geo. 5. c. ciii)) relating to Ipswich Corporation trolley vehicles.
	Ipswich Corporation (Trolley Vehicles) Order 1946 Order authorising the mayor aldermen and burgesses of the borough of Ipswich to provide maintain and use trolley vehicles upоn certain routes in that borough and in the parishes of Nacton Rushmere St. Andrew Sproughton and Whilton.	
Maidstone Corporation (Trolley Vehicles) Order Confirmation Act 1946	9 & 10 Geo. 6. c. xlvii	1 August 1946
An Act to confirm a Provisional Order made by the Minister of Transport under the Maidstone Corporation Act 1923 (Note: Maidstone Corporation Act 1923 (13 & 14 Geo. 5. c. xxxi)) relating to Maidstone Corporation trolley vehicles.
	Maidstone Corporation (Trolley Vehicles) Order 1946 Order authorising the mayor aldermen and burgesses of the borough of Maidstone to maintain and use trolley vehicles, upon a route in the borough of Maidstone and in the parish of Barming in the rural district of Maidstone.	
Reading Corporation (Trolley Vehicles) Order Confirmation Act 1946	9 & 10 Geo. 6. c. xlviii	1 August 1946
An Act to confirm a Provisional Order made by the Minister of Transport under the Reading Corporation Act 1935 (Note: Reading Corporation Act 1935 (25 & 26 Geo. 5. c. xc)) relating to Reading Corporation trolley vehicles.
	Reading Corporation (Trolley Vehicles) Order 1946 Order authorising the mayor aldermen and burgesses of the borough of Reading to use trolley vehicles upon additional routes in the borough of Reading.	
Long Eaton Urban District Council Act 1946	9 & 10 Geo. 6. c. xlix	1 August 1946
An Act to confer further powers on the urban district council of Long Eaton in regard to their electricity and water undertakings lands and other matters to make further and better provision for the improvement health and local government of their district and for other purposes.
High Wycombe Corporation Act 1946	9 & 10 Geo. 6. c. l	1 August 1946
An Act to alter the name of the borough of Chepping Wycombe to provide for the extinction of lammas rights in or over certain lands in the borough known as Kings Mead and of commonable rights in or over other lands therein known as Marsh Green and Keep Hill to confer further powers upon the Corporation in regard to the health local government and improvement of the borough and for other purposes.
Cardiff Corporation Act 1946	9 & 10 Geo. 6. c. li	1 August 1946
An Act to authorise the lord mayor aldermen and citizens of the city of Cardiff to execute works and acquire lands to authorise the Corporation to run trolley vehicles on an additional route to confer further powers upon the Corporation and for other purposes.
Birmingham Corporation Act 1946	9 & 10 Geo. 6. c. lii	1 August 1946
An Act to provide for the improvement of the central area of the city of Birmingham by the construction of an inner ring road (Note: Queensway is the Birmingham inner ring road.) and other works to make further provision with respect to the water electricity and gas undertakings of the lord mayor aldermen and citizens of the city to alter the limits for the supply of water by the councils of the cities of Birmingham and Coventry to make further provision with respect to the health local government and improvement of the city of Birmingham and for other purposes.
Tees Conservancy Act 1946	9 & 10 Geo. 6. c. liii	1 August 1946
An Act to alter the constitution of the Tees Conservancy Commissioners to authorise the Commissioners to make works to acquire and hold lands and to provide and carry on docks wharves quays landing places and the like to make provision for the rates tolls dues and charges demandable by the Commissioners to extend the time for the construction of certain works by the Commissioners to confer upon the Commissioners further powers with respect to the raising of money and for other purposes.
Rotherham Corporation Act 1946	9 & 10 Geo. 6. c. liv	1 August 1946
An Act to confer powers upon the mayor aldermen and burgesses of the county borough of Rotherham for the acquisition of land in the borough and the erection of houses thereon and the development thereof to authorise the construction of an arterial road and street improvements and the acquisition of land for sundry purposes and to make further provision with regard to the transport water and gas undertakings of the said mayor aldermen and burgesses and the health local government and improvement of the borough and for other purposes.
Bromborough Dock Act 1946 (repealed)	9 & 10 Geo. 6. c. lv	1 August 1946
An Act to remove doubts as to the interpretation of certain enactments relating to the dock railway and other works authorised by the Bromborough Dock Act 1923. (Note: Bromborough Dock Act 1923 (13 & 14 Geo. 5. c. lxxii)) (Repealed by Bromborough Dock Act 1986 (c. xviii))
West Yorkshire Gas Distribution Act 1946	9 & 10 Geo. 6. c. lvi	1 August 1946
An Act to extend the powers of the West Yorkshire Gas Distribution Company to authorise that company to construct gasworks and to raise further money and for other purposes.
Ardrossan Gas Order Confirmation Act 1946	9 & 10 Geo. 6. c. lvii	6 November 1946
An Act to confirm a Provisional Order under the Burgh Police (Scotland) Act 1892 (Note: Burgh Police (Scotland) Act 1892 (55 & 56 Vict. c. 55)) relating to Ardrossan Gas.
	Ardrossan Gas Order 1946 Ardrossan Gas. Provisional Order.	
Ministry of Health Provisional Order Confirmation (Norwich) Act 1946 (repealed)	9 & 10 Geo. 6. c. lviii	6 November 1946
An Act to confirm a Provisional Order of the Minister of Health relating to the city of Norwich. (Repealed by Norwich City Council Act 1984 (c. xxiii))
	Norwich Markets Order 1946 Provisional Order altering and partially repealing a local Act. (Note: Norwich Corporation Markets Act 1860 (23 & 24 Vict. c. xxxiv))	
Aberdeen Harbour Order Confirmation Act 1946 (repealed)	9 & 10 Geo. 6. c. lix	6 November 1946
An Act to make a Provisional Order under the Private Legislation Procedure (Scotland) Act 1936 relating to Aberdeen Harbour. (Repealed by Statute Law (Repeals) Act 1986 (c. 12))
	Aberdeen Harbour Order 1946 Provisional Order to extend the period of duration of the Aberdeen Harbour Acts 1895 to 1939.	
Northmet Power Act 1946	9 & 10 Geo. 6. c. lx	6 November 1946
An Act to empower the Northmet Power Company to take on lease and operate a generating station to be erected by the North Metropolitan Power Station Company Limited.
Glasgow Corporation Act 1946	9 & 10 Geo. 6. c. lxi	6 November 1946
An Act to confer further police powers on the Corporation of the city of Glasgow and for other purposes.
Banbury Corporation Act 1946	9 & 10 Geo. 6. c. lxii	6 November 1946
An Act to provide for the transfer to the mayor aldermen and burgesses of the borough of Banbury of the undertaking of the Banbury Water Company and of certain waterworks and property of the Banbury Rural District Council to authorise the said mayor aldermen and burgesses to construct waterworks and to acquire lands to define the limits within which they may supply water and to confer further powers upon them with regard to the supply of water therein to make further provision with regard to the finance of the said borough and for other purposes.

=== Private and personal acts ===
Short title	Citation	Royal assent
Long title
Marquess of Abergavenny's Estate Act 1946	9 & 10 Geo. 6. c. 1 Pr.	12 July 1946
An Act for enabling the settled estates of the Marquess of Abergavenny to be disentailed and to enable capital moneys to be raise out of the said settled estates and for other purposes connected with those estates.
Rhodes Trust Act 1946	9 & 10 Geo. 6. c. 2 Pr.	26 July 1946
An Act to incorporate the trustees of the will of the late Right Honourable Cecil John Rhodes and for other purposes.

=== Sources ===
- The Public General Acts and the Church Assembly Measures of 1946. The Proprietors of the Law Journal Reports. pp. 1–1224.

== 10 & 11 Geo. 6 ==
The second session of the 38th Parliament of the United Kingdom, which met from 12 November 1946 until 20 October 1947.

This session was also traditionally cited as 10 & 11 G. 6.

=== Public general acts ===
Short title	Citation	Royal assent
Long title
Expiring Laws Continuance Act 1946 (repealed)	10 & 11 Geo. 6. c. 1	19 December 1946
An Act to continue certain expiring laws. (Repealed by Statute Law Revision Act 1950 (14 Geo. 6. c. 6))
Ministry of Defence Act 1946 (repealed)	10 & 11 Geo. 6. c. 2	19 December 1946
An Act to make provision for the appointment and functions of a Minister of Defence, and for purposes connected therewith. (Repealed by Defence (Transfer of Functions) (No. 1) Order 1964 (SI 1964/488))
Unemployment and Family Allowances (Northern Ireland Agreement) Act 1946 (repealed)	10 & 11 Geo. 6. c. 3	19 December 1946
An Act to confirm and give effect to an agreement made between the Treasury and the Ministry of Finance for Northern Ireland with a view to assimilating the burdens on the Exchequer of the United Kingdom and the Exchequer of Northern Ireland in respect of social insurance and allied services. (Repealed by Social Services (Northern Ireland Agreement) Act 1949 (12, 13 & 14 Geo. 6. c. 23))
Royal Marines Act 1946 (repealed)	10 & 11 Geo. 6. c. 4	19 December 1946
An Act to extend the time limited for service in the Royal Marine Forces. (Repealed by Revision of the Army and Air Force Acts (Transitional Provisions) Act 1955 (3 & 4 Eliz. 2. c. 20))

=== Local acts ===
Short title	Citation	Royal assent
Long title
St. Andrews Links Order Confirmation Act 1946 (repealed)	10 & 11 Geo. 6. c. i	19 December 1946
An Act to confirm a Provisional Order under the Private Legislation Procedure (Scotland) Act 1936 (Note: Private Legislation Procedure (Scotland) Act 1936 (26 Geo. 5 & 1 Edw. 8. c. 52)) relating to St. Andrews Links. (Repealed by St. Andrews Links Order Confirmation Act 1974 (c. iii))
	St. Andrews Links Order 1946 Provisional Order to confer further powers on the provost magistrates and councillors of the burgh of St. Andrews in reference to the links of St. Andrews and adjoining lands and for other purposes.	
Arbroath Gas Order Confirmation Act 1946	10 & 11 Geo. 6. c. ii	19 December 1946
An Act to confirm a Provisional Order under the Burgh Police (Scotland) Act 1892 (Note: Burgh Police (Scotland) Act 1892 (55 & 56 Vict. c. 55)) relating to Arbroath Gas.
	Arbroath Gas Order 1946 Arbroath Gas. Provisional Order.	
London and North Eastern Railway Order Confirmation Act 1946	10 & 11 Geo. 6. c. iii	19 December 1946
An Act to confirm a Provisional Order under the Private Legislation Procedure (Scotland) Act 1936 relating to the London and North Eastern Railway.
	London and North Eastern Railway Order 1946 Provisional Order to make provision for the abandonment by the London and North Eastern Railway Company of the Burntisland and Granton Ferry and for other purposes.	

=== Sources ===
- The Public General Acts and the Church Assembly Measures of 1946. The Proprietors of the Law Journal Reports. pp. 1225–1232.

== See also ==
- List of acts of the Parliament of the United Kingdom
