= List of acts of the Parliament of the United Kingdom from 1952 =

This is a complete list of acts of the Parliament of the United Kingdom for the year 1952.

Note that the first parliament of the United Kingdom was held in 1801; parliaments between 1707 and 1800 were either parliaments of Great Britain or of Ireland. For acts passed up until 1707, see the list of acts of the Parliament of England and the list of acts of the Parliament of Scotland. For acts passed from 1707 to 1800, see the list of acts of the Parliament of Great Britain. See also the list of acts of the Parliament of Ireland.

For acts of the devolved parliaments and assemblies in the United Kingdom, see the list of acts of the Scottish Parliament, the list of acts of the Northern Ireland Assembly, and the list of acts and measures of Senedd Cymru; see also the list of acts of the Parliament of Northern Ireland.

The number shown after each act's title is its chapter number. Acts passed before 1963 are cited using this number, preceded by the year(s) of the reign during which the relevant parliamentary session was held; thus the Union with Ireland Act 1800 is cited as "39 & 40 Geo. 3 c. 67", meaning the 67th act passed during the session that started in the 39th year of the reign of George III and which finished in the 40th year of that reign. Note that the modern convention is to use Arabic numerals in citations (thus "41 Geo. 3" rather than "41 Geo. III"). Acts of the last session of the Parliament of Great Britain and the first session of the Parliament of the United Kingdom are both cited as "41 Geo. 3". Acts passed from 1963 onwards are simply cited by calendar year and chapter number.

== 15 & 16 Geo. 6 & 1 Eliz. 2 ==
Continuing the first session of the 40th Parliament of the United Kingdom, which met from 31 October 1951 until 30 October 1952.

This session was also traditionally cited as 15 & 16 G. 6 & 1 Eliz. 2.

=== Public general acts ===
Short title	Citation	Royal assent
Long title
Income Tax Act 1952 (Note: This was the first public act of the reign of Queen Elizabeth II.) (repealed)	15 & 16 Geo. 6 & 1 Eliz. 2. c. 10	28 February 1952
An Act to consolidate certain of the enactments relating to income tax, including certain enactments relating also to other taxes. (Repealed by Income and Corporation Taxes Act 1970 (c. 10) and Statute Law (Repeals) Act 2013 (c. 2))
Northern Ireland (Foyle Fisheries) Act 1952 (repealed)	15 & 16 Geo. 6 & 1 Eliz. 2. c. 11	28 February 1952
An Act to enable the Parliament of Northern Ireland to legislate with respect to fisheries in the Foyle Area and related matters. (Repealed by Northern Ireland Constitution Act 1973 (c. 36))
Judicial Offices (Salaries, &c.) Act 1952 (repealed)	15 & 16 Geo. 6 & 1 Eliz. 2. c. 12	13 March 1952
An Act to make further provision as to the sums payable by way of salary, pension or allowances in respect of certain judicial offices. (Repealed for Scotland by Courts Reform (Scotland) Act 2014 (asp 18) and for England and Wales by Courts Reform (Scotland) Act 2014 (Consequential Provisions and Modifications) Order 2015 (SI 2015/700))
Festival Pleasure Gardens Act 1952 (repealed)	15 & 16 Geo. 6 & 1 Eliz. 2. c. 13	13 March 1952
An Act to make provision, for a limited period, to continue the Festival Pleasure Gardens in Battersea Park; and for purposes connected therewith. (Repealed by Statute Law (Repeals) Act 1986 (c. 12))
Merchant Shipping Act 1952 (repealed)	15 & 16 Geo. 6 & 1 Eliz. 2. c. 14	13 March 1952
An Act to enable the Minister of Transport to grant exemptions from requirements as to crew accommodation imposed under the Merchant Shipping Act, 1948, (Note: Merchant Shipping Act 1948 (11 & 12 Geo. 6. c. 44)) and the Merchant Shipping Act, 1950. (Note: Merchant Shipping Act 1950 (14 Geo. 6. c. 9)) (Repealed by Merchant Shipping Act 1970 (c. 36))
Agriculture (Fertilisers) Act 1952 (repealed)	15 & 16 Geo. 6 & 1 Eliz. 2. c. 15	13 March 1952
An Act to authorise the payment out of moneys provided by Parliament of contributions for relief of occupiers of agricultural land in respect of expenditure on fertilisers. (Repealed by Statute Law (Repeals) Act 1986 (c. 12))
Consolidated Fund Act 1952 (repealed)	15 & 16 Geo. 6 & 1 Eliz. 2. c. 16	27 March 1952
An Act to apply certain sums out of the Consolidated Fund to the service of the years ending on the thirty-first day of March, one thousand nine hundred and fifty-two and one thousand nine hundred and fifty-three. (Repealed by Statute Law Revision Act 1964 (c. 79))
Industrial and Provident Societies Act 1952 (repealed)	15 & 16 Geo. 6 & 1 Eliz. 2. c. 17	27 March 1952
An Act to raise the limit on the interest in the shares of a society registered under the Industrial and Provident Societies Act, 1893, (Note: Industrial and Provident Societies Act 1893 (56 & 57 Vict. c. 39)) which any one member may hold and to alter the conditions subject to which such a society may accept deposits without being treated as carrying on the business of banking. (Repealed by Industrial and Provident Societies Act 1965 (c. 12))
Diplomatic Immunities (Commonwealth Countries and Republic of Ireland) Act 1952 (repealed)	15 & 16 Geo. 6 & 1 Eliz. 2. c. 18	27 March 1952
An Act to confer certain immunities on the representatives in the United Kingdom of Commonwealth countries and the Republic of Ireland, and of the states and provinces of any of those countries, and on members of the staffs of such representatives, and on the families of such representatives and of members of their staffs, and on other persons in the service of the governments of those countries; and for purposes connected with the matters aforesaid. (Repealed by Diplomatic and other Privileges Act 1971 (c. 64))
Metropolitan Police (Borrowing Powers) Act 1952 (repealed)	15 & 16 Geo. 6 & 1 Eliz. 2. c. 19	30 April 1952
An Act to confer a further borrowing power on the Receiver for the Metropolitan Police District and determine certain of his existing borrowing powers. (Repealed by Metropolitan Magistrates' Courts Act 1959 (7 & 8 Eliz. 2. c. 45))
Cinematograph Film Production (Special Loans) Act 1952 (repealed)	15 & 16 Geo. 6 & 1 Eliz. 2. c. 20	30 April 1952
An Act to empower the National Film Finance Corporation to borrow otherwise than from the Board of Trade. (Repealed for England and Wales and Scotland by Films Act 1980 (c. 41) and for Northern Ireland by National Film Finance Corporation Act 1981 (c. 15))
Export Guarantees Act 1952 (repealed)	15 & 16 Geo. 6 & 1 Eliz. 2. c. 21	30 April 1952
An Act to increase the amount of the liabilities which may be undertaken by the Board of Trade in respect of guarantees under sections one and two of the Export Guarantees Act, 1949. (Repealed by Export Guarantees Act 1959 (7 & 8 Eliz. 2. c. 63))
Hydro-Electric Development (Scotland) Act 1952 (repealed)	15 & 16 Geo. 6 & 1 Eliz. 2. c. 22	30 April 1952
An Act to extend the borrowing powers of the North of Scotland Hydro-Electric Board. (Repealed by Electricity (Borrowing Powers) Act 1959 (7 & 8 Eliz. 2. c. 20))
Miners' Welfare Act 1952	15 & 16 Geo. 6 & 1 Eliz. 2. c. 23	30 April 1952
An Act to discontinue the royalties welfare levy, dissolve the Miners' Welfare Commission and wind up the miners' welfare fund; to provide for the determination of certain trusts and agreements relating to property derived from the said fund, for the transfer to the National Coal Board or the Coal Industry Social Welfare Organisation of certain property, rights, liabilities, obligations and functions, and for requiring the said Board to make certain payments to the said organisation; to provide for the superannuation of employees of the said organisation; to amend section forty-one of the Coal Industry Nationalisation Act, 1946; (Note: Coal Industry Nationalisation Act 1946 (9 & 10 Geo. 6. c. 59)) and for purposes connected with the matters aforesaid.
Army and Air Force (Annual) Act 1952 (repealed)	15 & 16 Geo. 6 & 1 Eliz. 2. c. 24	30 April 1952
An Act to provide, until the end of the month of July, nineteen hundred and fifty-three, for the discipline and regulation of the Army and the Air Force and to amend certain enactments relating to the armed forces of the Crown. (Repealed by Revision of the Army and Air Force Acts (Transitional Provisions) Act 1955 (3 & 4 Eliz. 2. c. 20))
National Health Service Act 1952 (repealed)	15 & 16 Geo. 6 & 1 Eliz. 2. c. 25	22 May 1952
An Act to make further provision with respect to the making and recovery of charges in respect of services provided under the National Health Service Act, 1946 (Note: National Health Service Act 1946 (9 & 10 Geo. 6. c. 81)) and the National Health Service (Scotland) Act, 1947; (Note: National Health Service (Scotland) Act 1947 (10 & 11 Geo. 6. c. 27)) and for purposes connected therewith. (Repealed for England and Wales by National Health Service Act 1977 (c. 49) and for Scotland by National Health Service (Scotland) Act 1978 (c. 29))
Empire Settlement Act 1952 (repealed)	15 & 16 Geo. 6 & 1 Eliz. 2. c. 26	22 May 1952
An Act to extend the period for which the Secretary of State may make contributions under schemes agreed under section one of the Empire Settlement Act, 1922. (Note: Empire Settlement Act 1922 (12 & 13 Geo. 5. c. 13)) (Repealed by Commonwealth Settlement Act 1957 (5 & 6 Eliz. 2. c. 8))
New Towns Act 1952 (repealed)	15 & 16 Geo. 6 & 1 Eliz. 2. c. 27	26 June 1952
An Act to increase the amount of the advances which may be made under section twelve of the New Towns Act, 1946. (Note: New Towns Act 1946 (9 & 10 Geo. 6. c. 68)) (Repealed by New Towns Act 1955 (3 & 4 Eliz. 2. c. 4))
Corneal Grafting Act 1952 (repealed)	15 & 16 Geo. 6 & 1 Eliz. 2. c. 28	26 June 1952
An Act to make provision with respect to the use of eyes of deceased persons for therapeutic purposes. (Repealed by Human Tissue Act 1961 (9 & 10 Eliz. 2. c. 54))
Family Allowances and National Insurance Act 1952 (repealed)	15 & 16 Geo. 6 & 1 Eliz. 2. c. 29	26 June 1952
An Act to provide for increasing rates of allowances under the Family Allowances Act, 1945, (Note: Family Allowances Act 1945 (8 & 9 Geo. 6. c. 41)) and rates or amounts of contributions and benefits under the National Insurance Acts, 1946 to 1951; and for purposes connected with the matters aforesaid. (Repealed by Statute Law Revision (Consequential Repeals) Act 1965 (c. 55))
Distribution of German Enemy Property Act 1952	15 & 16 Geo. 6 & 1 Eliz. 2. c. 30	26 June 1952
An Act to amend the definition of "German enemy debt" for the purposes of the Distribution of German Enemy Property Act, 1949, (Note: Distribution of German Enemy Property Act 1949 (12, 13 & 14 Geo. 6. c. 85)) in relation to sums due at the passing of that Act in respect of certain German public securities.
Cremation Act 1952	15 & 16 Geo. 6 & 1 Eliz. 2. c. 31	26 June 1952
An Act to amend the law relating to cremation; and for purposes connected therewith. (Repealed for Scotland by Burial and Cremation (Scotland) Act 2016 (asp 20))
Electricity Supply (Meters) Act 1952 (repealed)	15 & 16 Geo. 6 & 1 Eliz. 2. c. 32	26 June 1952
An Act to extend by five years the period at the expiration of which section three of the Electricity Supply (Meters) Act, 1936, (Note: Electricity Supply (Meters) Act 1936 (26 Geo. 5 & 1 Edw. 8. c. 20)) is to cease to apply to any electricity meters. (Repealed by Statute Law (Repeals) Act 1971 (c. 52))
Finance Act 1952	15 & 16 Geo. 6 & 1 Eliz. 2. c. 33	9 July 1952
An Act to grant certain duties, to alter other duties, and to amend the law relating to the National Debt and the Public Revenue, and to make further provision in connection with Finance.
Post Office and Telegraph (Money) Act 1952 (repealed)	15 & 16 Geo. 6 & 1 Eliz. 2. c. 34	9 July 1952
An Act to provide for raising further money for the development of the postal, telegraphic and telephonic systems and of any other business of the Post Office, and for the repayment to the Post Office Fund of money applied thereout for such development; for treating capital expenditure incurred for the purposes of the Post Office Savings Bank as not incurred in the execution of the enactments relating to that Bank; and for purposes connected with the matters aforesaid. (Repealed by Post Office Act 1961 (9 & 10 Eliz. 2. c. 15))
Agriculture (Ploughing Grants) Act 1952 (repealed)	15 & 16 Geo. 6 & 1 Eliz. 2. c. 35	9 July 1952
An Act to authorise the payment out of moneys provided by Parliament of grants in respect of the ploughing up of land under grass and the carrying out of further operations on the land after ploughing. (Repealed by Statute Law (Repeals) Act 1986 (c. 12))
Post Office (Amendment) Act 1952 (repealed)	15 & 16 Geo. 6 & 1 Eliz. 2. c. 36	9 July 1952
An Act to increase to threepence the maximum poundage payable in respect of postal orders for amounts not exceeding twenty-one shillings. (Repealed by Post Office Act 1953 (1 & 2 Eliz. 2. c. 36))
Civil List Act 1952	15 & 16 Geo. 6 & 1 Eliz. 2. c. 37	1 August 1952
An Act to make provision for the honour and dignity of the Crown and the Royal Family, as to the disposal in certain circumstances of revenues of the Duchy of Cornwall, and for the payment of certain allowances and pensions.
Appropriation Act 1952 (repealed)	15 & 16 Geo. 6 & 1 Eliz. 2. c. 38	1 August 1952
An Act to apply a sum out of the Consolidated Fund to the service of the year ending on the thirty-first day of March, one thousand nine hundred and fifty-three and to appropriate the supplies granted in this Session of Parliament. (Repealed by Statute Law Revision Act 1964 (c. 79))
Motor Vehicles (International Circulation) Act 1952	15 & 16 Geo. 6 & 1 Eliz. 2. c. 39	1 August 1952
An Act to re-enact with modifications the Motor Car (International Circulation) Act, 1909; (Note: Motor Car (International Circulation) Act 1909 (9 Edw. 7. c. 37)) to amend the law relating to excise duty payable in Great Britain on vehicles licensed in Northern Ireland and in Northern Ireland on vehicles licensed in Great Britain; and for purposes connected with the matters aforesaid.
Crown Lessees (Protection of Sub-Tenants) Act 1952 (repealed)	15 & 16 Geo. 6 & 1 Eliz. 2. c. 40	1 August 1952
An Act to abolish exemptions from the Rent and Mortgage Interest Restrictions Acts, 1920 to 1939, the Rent of Furnished Houses Control (Scotland) Act, 1943, (Note: Rent of Furnished Houses Control (Scotland) Act 1943 (6 & 7 Geo. 6. c. 44)) the Furnished Houses (Rent Control) Act, 1946, (Note: Furnished Houses (Rent Control) Act 1946 (9 & 10 Geo. 6. c. 34)) and the Landlord and Tenant (Rent Control) Act, 1949, (Note: Landlord and Tenant (Rent Control) Act 1949 (12, 13 & 14 Geo. 6. c. 40)) which arise by reason of the subsistence of a superior interest belonging to the Crown, the Duchy of Lancaster or the Duchy of Cornwall. (Repealed for England and Wales by Rent Act 1968 (c. 23) and for Scotland by Rent (Scotland) Act 1971 (c. 28))
Affiliation Orders Act 1952 (repealed)	15 & 16 Geo. 6 & 1 Eliz. 2. c. 41	1 August 1952
An Act to amend the Bastardy Laws Amendment Act, 1872, (Note: Bastardy Laws Amendment Act 1872 (35 & 36 Vict. c. 65)) by increasing to thirty shillings the maximum weekly payment in respect of a child under an affiliation order, and, in the case of a child engaged in a course of education or training, to extend until the child reaches the age of twenty-one the period for which under that Act payments may be continued under an affiliation order or for which under the Illegitimate Children (Scotland) Act, 1930, (Note: Illegitimate Children (Scotland) Act 1930 (20 & 21 Geo. 5. c. 33)) the parents are under obligation to provide aliment; and for purposes connected therewith. (Repealed by Family Law (Scotland) Act 1985 (c. 37))
Heating Appliances (Fireguards) Act 1952 (repealed)	15 & 16 Geo. 6 & 1 Eliz. 2. c. 42	1 August 1952
An Act to prohibit the sale or letting of certain heating appliances without an effective fireguard; and for purposes connected therewith. (Repealed by Consumer Protection Act 1961 (9 & 10 Eliz. 2. c. 40))
Disposal of Uncollected Goods Act 1952 (repealed)	15 & 16 Geo. 6 & 1 Eliz. 2. c. 43	1 August 1952
An Act to authorise the disposal of goods accepted in the course of a business for repair or other treatment but not re-delivered; and for purposes connected therewith. (Repealed by Torts (Interference with Goods) Act 1977 (c. 32))
Customs and Excise Act 1952	15 & 16 Geo. 6 & 1 Eliz. 2. c. 44	1 August 1952
An Act to consolidate with amendments certain enactments relating to customs and excise and to extend certain provisions of those enactments to any other matter in relation to which the Commissioners of Customs and Excise are for the time being required in pursuance of any enactment to perform any duties.
Pensions (Increase) Act 1952 (repealed)	15 & 16 Geo. 6 & 1 Eliz. 2. c. 45	1 August 1952
An Act to authorise certain increases in the case of pensions to which the Pensions (Increase) Acts, 1944 (Note: Pensions (Increase) Act 1944 (7 & 8 Geo. 6. c. 21)) and 1947, (Note: Pensions (Increase) Act 1947 (10 & 11 Geo. 6. c. 7)) apply, and of certain other pensions. (Repealed by Pensions (Increase) Act 1971 (c. 56))
Hypnotism Act 1952	15 & 16 Geo. 6 & 1 Eliz. 2. c. 46	1 August 1952
An Act to regulate the demonstration of hypnotic phenomena for purposes of public entertainment.
Rating and Valuation (Scotland) Act 1952	15 & 16 Geo. 6 & 1 Eliz. 2. c. 47	1 August 1952
An Act to amend the law relating to the rating and valuation of lands and heritages in Scotland leased or occupied by certain public bodies and of lands and heritages used or occupied as sub-post offices in Scotland; and to make provision for notice to rating authorities of proposed entries in the valuation roll made up by the Assessor of Public Undertakings (Scotland), for correction and amendment of the said roll and for prescribing dates for the purposes thereof, and for regulating the procedure in valuation appeals in Scotland.
Costs in Criminal Cases Act 1952 (repealed)	15 & 16 Geo. 6 & 1 Eliz. 2. c. 48	1 August 1952
An Act to consolidate certain enactments relating to costs in criminal cases with corrections and improvements made under the Consolidation of Enactments (Procedure) Act, 1949. (Note: Consolidation of Enactments (Procedure) Act 1949 (12, 13 & 14 Geo. 6. c. 33)) (Repealed by Costs in Criminal Cases Act 1973 (c. 14))
Court of Chancery of Lancaster Act 1952 (repealed)	15 & 16 Geo. 6 & 1 Eliz. 2. c. 49	1 August 1952
An Act to permit the transfer of proceedings from the High Court of Justice to the Court of Chancery of the County Palatine of Lancaster. (Repealed by Courts Act 1971 (c. 23))
Children and Young Persons (Amendment) Act 1952 (repealed)	15 & 16 Geo. 6 & 1 Eliz. 2. c. 50	1 August 1952
An Act to amend the Children and Young Persons Act, 1933, (Note: Children and Young Persons Act 1933 (23 & 24 Geo. 5. c. 12)) and section twenty-seven of the Criminal Justice Act, 1948; (Note: Criminal Justice Act 1948 (11 & 12 Geo. 6. c. 58)) and for purposes connected therewith. (Repealed by Statute Law (Repeals) Act 1993 (c. 50))
Isle of Man (Customs) Act 1952 (repealed)	15 & 16 Geo. 6 & 1 Eliz. 2. c. 51	1 August 1952
An Act to amend the law with respect to customs in the Isle of Man. (Repealed for the Isle of Man by Customs and Excise etc. Order 1976 (GC No 1/76))
Prison Act 1952	15 & 16 Geo. 6 & 1 Eliz. 2. c. 52	1 August 1952
An Act to consolidate certain enactments relating to prisons and other institutions for offenders and related matters with corrections and improvements made under the Consolidation of Enactments (Procedure) Act, 1949.
Housing Act 1952 (repealed)	15 & 16 Geo. 6 & 1 Eliz. 2. c. 53	1 August 1952
An Act to increase the amounts of the annual exchequer, rate fund and county council contributions under the Housing (Financial and Miscellaneous Provisions) Act, 1946; (Note: Housing (Financial and Miscellaneous Provisions) Act 1946 (9 & 10 Geo. 6. c. 48)) to enable contributions under section three of the Housing (Financial Provisions) Act, 1938, (Note: Housing (Financial Provisions) Act 1938 (1 & 2 Geo. 6. c. 16)) to be made in respect of houses occupied under contracts of service by members of the agricultural population, and to amend section twenty-three of the Housing Act, 1949, (Note: Housing Act 1949 (12, 13 & 14 Geo. 6. c. 60)) in relation to dwellings so occupied; to amend section seventy-nine of the Housing Act, 1936, (Note: Housing Act 1936 (26 Geo. 5 & 1 Edw. 8. c. 51)) in relation to sales and leases of houses by local authorities and to extend the powers of local authorities to acquire land under Part V of that Act; and for purposes connected with the matters aforesaid. (Repealed by Housing (Financial Provisions) Act 1958 (6 & 7 Eliz. 2. c. 42))
Town Development Act 1952 (repealed)	15 & 16 Geo. 6 & 1 Eliz. 2. c. 54	1 August 1952
An Act to encourage town development in county districts for the relief of congestion or over-population elsewhere, and for related purposes, and to repeal subsection (5) of section nineteen of the Town and Country Planning Act, 1944, (Note: Town and Country Planning Act 1944 (7 & 8 Geo. 6. c. 47)) and part of subsection (1) of section five of the New Towns Act, 1946. (Repealed by Local Government and Housing Act 1989 (c. 42))
Magistrates' Courts Act 1952 (repealed)	15 & 16 Geo. 6 & 1 Eliz. 2. c. 55	1 August 1952
An Act to consolidate certain enactments relating to the jurisdiction of, and the practice and procedure before, magistrates' courts and the functions of justices' clerks, and to matters connected therewith, with corrections and improvements made under the Consolidation of Enactments (Procedure) Act, 1949. (Repealed by Magistrates' Courts Act 1980 (c. 43))
Insurance Contracts (War Settlement) Act 1952 (repealed)	15 & 16 Geo. 6 & 1 Eliz. 2. c. 56	30 October 1952
An Act to provide for carrying into effect Agreements with certain foreign Governments with respect to contracts of insurance and reinsurance made by persons who subsequently became enemies. (Repealed by Statute Law (Repeals) Act 1981 (c. 19))
Marine and Aviation Insurance (War Risks) Act 1952	15 & 16 Geo. 6 & 1 Eliz. 2. c. 57	30 October 1952
An Act to make provision for authorising the Minister of Transport to undertake the insurance of ships, aircraft and certain other goods against war risks and, in certain circumstances, other risks; for the payment by him of compensation in respect of certain goods lost or damaged in transit in consequence of war risks; and for purposes connected with the matters aforesaid.
Irish Sailors and Soldiers Land Trust Act 1952 (repealed)	15 & 16 Geo. 6 & 1 Eliz. 2. c. 58	30 October 1952
An Act to extend the powers of the Irish Sailors and Soldiers Land Trust to sell cottages provided for the purposes of the Trust. (Repealed by Irish Sailors and Soldiers Land Trust Act 1987 (c. 48))
Cockfighting Act 1952 (repealed)	15 & 16 Geo. 6 & 1 Eliz. 2. c. 59	30 October 1952
An Act to make it unlawful to have possession of any instrument or appliance designed or adapted for use in connection with the fighting of a domestic fowl. (Repealed for England and Wales by Animal Welfare Act 2006 (c. 45) and for Scotland by Animal Health and Welfare (Scotland) Act 2006 (asp 11))
Agriculture (Poisonous Substances) Act 1952 (repealed)	15 & 16 Geo. 6 & 1 Eliz. 2. c. 60	30 October 1952
An Act to provide for the protection of employees against risks of poisoning by certain substances used in agriculture. (Repealed by Health and Safety (Repeals and Revocations) Regulations 1996 (SI 1996/3022))
Prisons (Scotland) Act 1952 (repealed)	15 & 16 Geo. 6 & 1 Eliz. 2. c. 61	30 October 1952
An Act to consolidate certain enactments relating to prisons and other institutions for offenders in Scotland and related matters with corrections and improvements made under the Consolidation of Enactments (Procedure) Act, 1949. (Repealed by Prisons (Scotland) Act 1989 (c. 45))
Agriculture (Calf Subsidies) Act 1952 (repealed)	15 & 16 Geo. 6 & 1 Eliz. 2. c. 62	30 October 1952
An Act to make provision for the payment of subsidies in respect of calves and for purposes connected therewith. (Repealed by Statute Law (Repeals) Act 1986 (c. 12))
Housing (Scotland) Act 1952 (repealed)	15 & 16 Geo. 6 & 1 Eliz. 2. c. 63	30 October 1952
An Act to make fresh provision for the making of contributions out of the Exchequer and by local authorities in respect of housing accommodation provided in Scotland; to amend the provisions of the Housing (Scotland) Act, 1950, (Note: Housing (Scotland) Act 1950 (14 Geo. 6. c. 34)) relating to the conditions applying to dwellings in respect of which improvement grants have been made and to the recording in the Register of Sasines of notices with respect to such dwellings, to the payments to be made by a local authority into the housing repairs account, and to the making of certain orders; and for purposes connected with the matters aforesaid. (Repealed by Housing (Financial Provisions) (Scotland) Act 1972 (c. 46))
Intestates' Estates Act 1952	15 & 16 Geo. 6 & 1 Eliz. 2. c. 64	30 October 1952
An Act to amend the law of England and Wales about the property of persons dying intestate; to amend the Inheritance (Family Provision) Act, 1938; (Note: Inheritance (Family Provision) Act 1938 (1 & 2 Geo. 6. c. 45)) and for purposes connected therewith.
Licensed Premises in New Towns Act 1952 (repealed)	15 & 16 Geo. 6 & 1 Eliz. 2. c. 65	30 October 1952
An Act to repeal so much of the Licensing Act, 1949 (Note: Licensing Act 1949 (12, 13 & 14 Geo. 6. c. 59)) as provides for State management of the liquor trade in new towns; to make provision as to the grant of new justices' licences, and the removal of justices' licences, for or to premises in new towns in England and Wales and as to the grant of new certificates and the renewal of certificates in respect of premises in new towns in Scotland; and for purposes connected with the matters aforesaid. (Repealed for England and Wales by Licensing Act 1953 (1 & 2 Eliz. 2. c. 46) and for Scotland by Licensing (Scotland) Act 1959 (7 & 8 Eliz. 2. c. 51))
Defamation Act 1952	15 & 16 Geo. 6 & 1 Eliz. 2. c. 66	30 October 1952
An Act to amend the law relating to libel and slander and other malicious falsehoods.
Visiting Forces Act 1952	15 & 16 Geo. 6 & 1 Eliz. 2. c. 67	30 October 1952
An Act to make provision with respect to naval, military and air forces of certain other countries visiting the United Kingdom, and to provide for the apprehension and disposal of deserters or absentees without leave in the United Kingdom from the forces of such countries; to enable corresponding provision to be made in the law of colonies and dependencies; and for purposes connected with the matters aforesaid.
Cinematograph Act 1952 (repealed)	15 & 16 Geo. 6 & 1 Eliz. 2. c. 68	30 October 1952
An Act to extend and amend the Cinematograph Act, 1909, (Note: Cinematograph Act 1909 (9 Edw. 7. c. 30)) and, as respects cinematograph entertainments, to modify the enactments relating to music and dancing licences. (Repealed by Cinemas Act 1985 (c. 13))

=== Local acts ===
Short title	Citation	Royal assent
Long title
Glasgow Corporation Order Confirmation Act 1952	15 & 16 Geo. 6 & 1 Eliz. 2. c. i	13 March 1952
An Act to confirm a Provisional Order under the Private Legislation Procedure (Scotland) Act 1936 (Note: Private Legislation Procedure (Scotland) Act 1936 (26 Geo. 5 & 1 Edw. 8. c. 52)) relating to Glasgow Corporation.
	Glasgow Corporation Order 1952	
Edinburgh Merchant Company Endowments (Amendment) Order Confirmation Act 1952 (repealed)	15 & 16 Geo. 6 & 1 Eliz. 2. c. ii	22 May 1952
An Act to confirm a Provisional Order under the Private Legislation Procedure (Scotland) Act 1936 relating to Edinburgh Merchant Company Endowments (Amendment). (Repealed by Edinburgh Merchant Company Order Confirmation Act 1960 (8 & 9 Eliz. 2. c. xix))
	Edinburgh Merchant Company Endowments (Amendment) Order 1952 Provisional Order to amalgamate James Gillespie's Hospital William Watherston's Endowment and the Gibb and Heriot Mortification administered by the Merchant Company Charities Board and to confer powers on the said Board to administer the said hospital endowment and mortification as one trust or charitable fund to enact provisions as to the qualifications of beneficiaries of the said trust as to the benefits to be granted to beneficiaries to extend the powers of investment of the said Board and for other purposes.	
Motherwell and Wishaw Burgh Order Confirmation Act 1952	15 & 16 Geo. 6 & 1 Eliz. 2. c. iii	22 May 1952
An Act to confirm a Provisional Order under the Private Legislation Procedure (Scotland) Act 1936 relating to Motherwell and Wishaw Burgh.
	Motherwell and Wishaw Burgh Order 1952 Provisional Order to extend the boundaries of the burgh of Motherwell and Wishaw to confer further powers upon the provost magistrates and councillors of the said burgh with regard to their water undertaking to make provision with respect to the local government health administration and finance of the said burgh and for other purposes.	
National Trust for Scotland Order Confirmation Act 1952	15 & 16 Geo. 6 & 1 Eliz. 2. c. iv	22 May 1952
An Act to confirm a Provisional Order under the Private Legislation Procedure (Scotland) Act 1936 relating to the National Trust for Scotland.
	National Trust for Scotland Order 1952 Provisional Order to confer further powers upon the National Trust for Scotland for Places of Historic Interest or Natural Beauty.	
London County Council (Holland House) Act 1952	15 & 16 Geo. 6 & 1 Eliz. 2. c. v	22 May 1952
An Act to sanction an agreement for the purchase by the London County Council of Holland House Kensington and grounds for use as a public open space.
City of London (Various Powers) Act 1952	15 & 16 Geo. 6 & 1 Eliz. 2. c. vi	22 May 1952
An Act to authorise a contribution out of the general rate of the city of London for the erection of new buildings and carrying out improvements at Guildhall to provide for the improvement of the amenities of the city to extend the powers of the police force of the city and for other purposes.
Tyne Improvement Act 1952	15 & 16 Geo. 6 & 1 Eliz. 2. c. vii	22 May 1952
An Act to empower the Tyne Improvement Commissioners to discontinue and remove the gates and pier at the entrances to their Northumberland Dock to authorise those Commissioners to abandon their Whitehill Point ferry and to borrow further money and for other purposes.
London County Council (General Powers) Act 1952	15 & 16 Geo. 6 & 1 Eliz. 2. c. viii	26 June 1952
An Act to confer further powers upon the London County Council and for other purposes.
Port of London Act 1952 (repealed)	15 & 16 Geo. 6 & 1 Eliz. 2. c. ix	26 June 1952 (Note: The Queen's Printer copy of this act erroneously gives 27 June 1952 as the date of royal assent.)
An Act to confer further powers on the Port of London Authority and for other purposes. (Repealed by Port of London Act 1967 (c. xxxii))
Blackpool Corporation Act 1952 (repealed)	15 & 16 Geo. 6 & 1 Eliz. 2. c. x	26 June 1952
An Act to confer further powers upon the mayor aldermen and burgesses of the borough of Blackpool in reference to their promenade and Stanley Park to make further provision with regard to the local government and improvement of the borough and for other purposes. (Repealed by County of Lancashire Act 1984 (c. xxi))
London County Council (Money) Act 1952 (repealed)	15 & 16 Geo. 6 & 1 Eliz. 2. c. xi	26 June 1952
An Act to regulate the expenditure on capital account and lending of money by the London County Council during the financial period from the first day of April one thousand nine hundred and fifty-two to the thirtieth day of September one thousand nine hundred and fifty-three and for other purposes. (Repealed by London County Council (Loans) Act 1955 (4 & 5 Eliz. 2. c. xxvi))
Pier and Harbour Order (Falmouth) Confirmation Act 1952	15 & 16 Geo. 6 & 1 Eliz. 2. c. xii	9 July 1952
An Act to confirm a Provisional Order made by the Minister of Transport under the General Pier and Harbour Act 1861 (Note: General Pier and Harbour Act 1861 (24 & 25 Vict. c. 45)) relating to Falmouth.
	Pier and Harbour Order (Falmouth) 1952 Provisional Order to amend the provisions of the Falmouth Piers Order 1878 and the Falmouth Corporation Quays Order 1902 relating to the application of rates revenue and income received under those Orders to authorise the Falmouth Corporation to demand and take increased rates dues and duties to provide for the revision of rates dues and duties to authorise the Corporation to borrow further moneys and for other purposes.	
Manchester Ship Canal Act 1952	15 & 16 Geo. 6 & 1 Eliz. 2. c. xiii	9 July 1952
An Act to confer further powers upon the Manchester Ship Canal Company and for other purposes.
Winchester Corporation Act 1952	15 & 16 Geo. 6 & 1 Eliz. 2. c. xiv	9 July 1952
An Act to empower the mayor aldermen and citizens of the city of Winchester to construct street works and to provide a parking place and a slaughter-house and to acquire lands for those and other purposes to make further provision in reference to lands to provide for the transfer to the Corporation of the undertaking of the Winchester Cemetery Company to make further provision in reference to the improvement health local government and finances of the city of Winchester and for other purposes.
Merchant Navy Memorial Act 1952	15 & 16 Geo. 6 & 1 Eliz. 2. c. xv	9 July 1952
An Act to confer further powers on the Imperial War Graves Commission with respect to the construction of a memorial at Tower Hill to officers and men of the Merchant Navy who perished in the recent world war and for other purposes.
Leamington Corporation Act 1952 (repealed)	15 & 16 Geo. 6 & 1 Eliz. 2. c. xvi	9 July 1952
An Act to extend the boundaries of the borough of Royal Leamington Spa to confer further powers on the mayor aldermen and burgesses of the borough in relation to lands to make further provision for the improvement health local government and finances of the borough and for other purposes. (Repealed by Warwick District Council Act 1984 (c. xxiv))
Kilmarnock Corporation Order Confirmation Act 1952 (repealed)	15 & 16 Geo. 6 & 1 Eliz. 2. c. xvii	1 August 1952
An Act to confirm a Provisional Order under the Private Legislation Procedure (Scotland) Act 1936 relating to Kilmarnock Corporation. (Repealed by Statute Law (Repeals) Act 1995 (c. 44))
	Kilmarnock Corporation Order 1952 Provisional Order to provide for the removal of the limitation on the amount of the public library rate leviable within the burgh of Kilmarnock.	
Leith Harbour and Docks Order Confirmation Act 1952 (repealed)	15 & 16 Geo. 6 & 1 Eliz. 2. c. xviii	1 August 1952
An Act to confirm a Provisional Order under the Private Legislation Procedure (Scotland) Act 1936 relating to Leith Harbour and Docks. (Repealed by Statute Law (Repeals) Act 1986)
	Leith Harbour and Docks Order 1952 Provisional Order to authorise the Commissioners for the harbour and docks of Leith to provider a towage service for the use and accommodation of vessels using the said harbour and docks and the harbour of Granton and to confer powers on the said Commissioners in respect thereof and for other purposes.	
Aberdeen Extension Order Confirmation Act 1952	15 & 16 Geo. 6 & 1 Eliz. 2. c. xix	1 August 1952
An Act to confirm a Provisional Order under the Private Legislation Procedure (Scotland) Act 1936 relating to Aberdeen Extension.
	Aberdeen Extension Order 1952 Provisional Order to extend the boundaries of the city and royal burgh of Aberdeen and for other purposes.	
Dundee Harbour and Tay Ferries Order Confirmation Act 1952	15 & 16 Geo. 6 & 1 Eliz. 2. c. xx	1 August 1952
An Act to confirm a Provisional Order under the Private Legislation Procedure (Scotland) Act 1936 relating to Dundee Harbour and Tay Ferries.
	Dundee Harbour and Tay Ferries Order 1952 Provisional Order to consolidate with amendments the Acts and Orders relating to the harbour of Dundee and the Tay Ferries to reconstitute and reincorporate the Trustees to authorise the Trustees to borrow additional money and for other purposes.	
Brighton Corporation (Trolley Vehicles) Order Confirmation Act 1952 (repealed)	15 & 16 Geo. 6 & 1 Eliz. 2. c. xxi	1 August 1952
An Act to confirm a Provisional Order made by the Minister of Transport under the Brighton Corporation (Transport) Act 1938 (Note: Brighton Corporation (Transport) Act 1938 (1 & 2 Geo. 6. c. lxxxix)) relating to Brighton Corporation trolley vehicles. (Repealed by East Sussex Act 1981 (c. xxv))
	Brighton Corporation (Trolley Vehicles) Order 1952 Provisional Order authorising the mayor aldermen and burgesses of the borough of Brighton to provide maintain equip and use trolley vehicles upon an additional route in that borough.	
Derby Corporation (Trolley Vehicles) Order Confirmation Act 1952	15 & 16 Geo. 6 & 1 Eliz. 2. c. xxii	1 August 1952
An Act to confirm a Provisional Order made by the Minister of Transport under the Derby Corporation Act 1930 (Note: Derby Corporation Act 1930 (20 & 21 Geo. 5. c. lxvi)) relating to Derby Corporation trolley vehicles. (Repealed by Derbyshire Act 1981 (c. xxxiv))
	Derby Corporation (Trolley Vehicles) Order 1952 Provisional Order authorising the mayor aldermen and burgesses of the borough of Derby to use trolley vehicles upon an additional route in that borough.	
Portsmouth Corporation (Trolley Vehicles) Order Confirmation Act 1952	15 & 16 Geo. 6 & 1 Eliz. 2. c. xxiii	1 August 1952
An Act to confirm a Provisional Order made by the Minister of Transport under the Portsmouth Corporation Act 1930 (Note: Portsmouth Corporation Act 1930 (20 & 21 Geo. 5. c. lii)) as amended by the Portsmouth Corporation Act 1946 (Note: Portsmouth Corporation Act 1946 (9 & 10 Geo. 6. c. xxxix)) relating to Portsmouth Corporation trolley vehicles.
	Portsmouth Corporation (Trolley Vehicles) Order 1952 Provisional Order authorising the lord mayor aldermen and citizens of the city of Portsmouth to use trolley vehicles upon an additional route in the city of Portsmouth.	
Pier and Harbour Order (Brighton) Confirmation Act 1952	15 & 16 Geo. 6 & 1 Eliz. 2. c. xxiv	1 August 1952
An Act to confirm a Provisional Order made by the Minister of Transport under the General Pier and Harbour Act 1861 relating to Brighton.
	Brighton Marine Palace and Pier Order 1952 Provisional Order to authorise the Brighton Marine Palace and Pier Company to levy and recover increased rates and charges to provide for the revision of the rates and charges and for other purposes.	
Pier and Harbour Order (Great Yarmouth) Confirmation Act 1952	15 & 16 Geo. 6 & 1 Eliz. 2. c. xxv	1 August 1952
An Act to confirm a Provisional Order made by the Minister of Transport under the General Pier and Harbour Act 1861 relating to Great Yarmouth.
	Great Yarmouth New Britannia Pier Order 1952 Provisional Order to authorise the Great Yarmouth New Britannia Company to borrow money and to levy and recover increased rates and charges to provide for the revision of the rates and charges and for other purposes.	
Pier and Harbour Order (Seaham Harbour) Confirmation Act 1952	15 & 16 Geo. 6 & 1 Eliz. 2. c. xxvi	1 August 1952
An Act to confirm a Provisional Order made by the Minister of Transport under the General Pier and Harbour Act 1861 relating to Seaham Harbour.
	Seaham Harbour Dock Order 1952 Provisional Order to authorise the Seaham Harbour Dock Company to demand and take increased dues rates and charges in certain cases to provide for the revision of dues rates and charges and for other purposes.	
Pier and Harbour Order (Herne Bay) Confirmation Act 1952	15 & 16 Geo. 6 & 1 Eliz. 2. c. xxvii	1 August 1952
An Act to confirm a Provisional Order made by the Minister of Transport under the General Pier and Harbour Act 1861 relating to Herne Bay.
	Herne Bay Pier Order 1952 Provisional Order to repeal the Orders relating to the undertaking known as the Herne Bay Pier to continue vested in the urban district council of Herne Bay the said undertaking to confer powers on the said Council with reference thereto and the maintenance management and improvement thereof and for other purposes.	
Pier and Harbour Order (King's Lynn) Confirmation Act 1952	15 & 16 Geo. 6 & 1 Eliz. 2. c. xxviii	1 August 1952
An Act to confirm a Provisional Order made by the Minister of Transport under the General Pier and Harbour Act 1861 relating to King's Lynn.
	King's Lynn Conservancy Order 1952 Provisional Order to authorise the King's Lynn Conservancy Board to levy and take additional rates on goods to provide for the revision of tolls dues rates and charges to authorise additional borrowing powers and for other purposes.	
Pier and Harbour Order (Minehead) Confirmation Act 1952	15 & 16 Geo. 6 & 1 Eliz. 2. c. xxix	1 August 1952
An Act to confirm a Provisional Order made by the Minister of Transport under the General Pier and Harbour Act 1861 relating to Minehead.
	Minehead Harbour Order 1952 Provisional Order to provide for the vesting in the urban district council of Minehead of the Minehead Harbour to confer powers on the Council with reference thereto and the maintenance management and improvement thereof and for other purposes.	
Governesses Benevolent Institution Act 1952	15 & 16 Geo. 6 & 1 Eliz. 2. c. xxx	1 August 1952
An Act to reconstitute and confer new powers upon the Governesses Benevolent Institution and for other purposes.
Canterbury and District Water Act 1952	15 & 16 Geo. 6 & 1 Eliz. 2. c. xxxi	1 August 1952
An Act to change the name of the Canterbury Gas and Water Company and to re-define the purposes for which the Company was established to provide for the transfer of British Gas three per centum Guaranteed Stock 1990-95 to the existing holders of the consolidated ordinary stock of the Company and for the reduction of the existing ordinary capital to authorise the Company to raise additional capital to extend the Company's limits of supply to confer further powers upon the Company and for other purposes.
Tottenham Corporation Act 1952	15 & 16 Geo. 6 & 1 Eliz. 2. c. xxxii	1 August 1952
An Act to empower the mayor aldermen and burgesses of the borough of Tottenham to appropriate and use certain common or waste lands to execute works for the improvement of the drainage of the borough to make further and better provision for the health local government and improvement of the borough and for other purposes.
Nottingham Corporation Act 1952	15 & 16 Geo. 6 & 1 Eliz. 2. c. xxxiii	1 August 1952
An Act to authorise the lord mayor aldermen and citizens of the city of Nottingham and county of the same city to construct waterworks and to purchase lands compulsorily for that and other purposes to make further provision in reference to the water transport and markets undertakings of the city to empower the Corporation to supply heat to confer further powers on the Corporation with regard to streets buildings sewers and drains and the health and good government of the city to enact provisions with respect to the finances of the city and the superannuation of certain officers and servants and for other purposes.
British Transport Commission Act 1952	15 & 16 Geo. 6 & 1 Eliz. 2. c. xxxiv	1 August 1952
An Act to empower the British Transport Commission to construct works and to acquire lands to provide for the transfer of part of the Nottingham Canal to the corporation of Nottingham and to confer powers on the corporation in regard thereto to extend the time for the completion of a railway and the compulsory purchase of certain lands to confer further powers on the Commission and for other purposes.
Glossop Water Act 1952	15 & 16 Geo. 6 & 1 Eliz. 2. c. xxxv	1 August 1952
An Act to transfer to the mayor aldermen and burgesses of the borough of Glossop as part of their water undertaking the Hurst reservoir of the commissioners of the Glossop reservoirs to provide for the dissolution of the said commissioners and the redemption of mortgages granted by the said commissioners to empower the said mayor aldermen and burgesses to construct a waterwork and to acquire lands for the purposes of their water undertaking to make further provision with respect to that undertaking and for other purposes.
Fareham Urban District Council Act 1952	15 & 16 Geo. 6 & 1 Eliz. 2. c. xxxvi	1 August 1952
An act to confer further powers on the urban district council of Fareham in regard to lands and to make further and better provision for the health local government finance and improvement of their district and for other purposes.
Rochdale Canal Act 1952	15 & 16 Geo. 6 & 1 Eliz. 2. c. xxxvii	1 August 1952
An Act to authorise the closing for navigation of part of the Rochdale Canal and for other purposes.
City of London (Guild Churches) Act 1952	15 & 16 Geo. 6 & 1 Eliz. 2. c. xxxviii	1 August 1952
An Act to enable the Bishop of London to designate and establish certain churches in the city of London as guild churches to serve the non-resident population of the city to associate the church of St. Lawrence Jewry in the precincts of Guildhall upon its becoming a guild church with the mayor and commonality of the city of London to enable the Bishop of London to associate certain churches with the civic life of the city wards to enable reorganisation schemes relating to the city to make further provisions as to the patronage of benefices and churches therein and for other purposes.
Scottish Mutual Assurance Society Act 1952	15 & 16 Geo. 6 & 1 Eliz. 2. c. xxxix	1 August 1952
An Act to incorporate the Scottish Mutual Assurance Society to provide for the control and management of the Society as a mutual assurance society and for the conversion of its share capital into stock to confer further powers on the Society and for other purposes.
Newcastle-upon-Tyne Corporation Act 1952	15 & 16 Geo. 6 & 1 Eliz. 2. c. xl	1 August 1952
An Act to empower the lord mayor aldermen and citizens of the city and county of Newcastle upon Tyne to construct a new quay in the city to authorise the running by the Corporation of trolley vehicles on additional routes to confer further powers upon and to enact further provisions in connection with the quays and road transport undertaking of the Corporation the finances and good government of the city and the superannuation and pensions of employees to confer further powers upon the Corporation and the stewards committee in relation to the Town Moor and for other purposes.
Clifton Suspension Bridge Act 1952	15 & 16 Geo. 6 & 1 Eliz. 2. c. xli	1 August 1952
An Act to constitute the Clifton Suspension Bridge Trust to incorporate the Trust and to make provision for the vesting in the Trustees of the property of the existing Trustees and for the constitution and proceedings of the Trustees to transfer to the Trustees the undertaking of the Clifton Suspension Bridge Company and to provide for the winding up and dissolution of that company to confer powers on the Trustees in relation to the said bridge and to the charging of tolls to make provision regarding the finances of the said trust to repeal the Acts relating to the Trustees and to the company and for other purposes.
Cheshire Brine Pumping (Compensation for Subsidence) Act 1952	15 & 16 Geo. 6 & 1 Eliz. 2. c. xlii	1 August 1952
An Act to form a brine subsidence compensation district and establish a compensation board (Note: Cheshire Brine Subsidence Compensation Board.) for that district in the administrative county of the county palatine of Chester to dissolve the Northwich Salt Compensation Board and for other purposes.
Kingston-upon-Hull Corporation Act 1952	15 & 16 Geo. 6 & 1 Eliz. 2. c. xliii	1 August 1952
An Act to empower the lord mayor aldermen and citizens of the city and county of Kingston upon Hull to construct a bridge across the river Hull and other works in the city to make further provision in reference to lands and the supply of water and the improvement health local government and finances of the city and for other purposes.
Llanelly District Traction Act 1952	15 & 16 Geo. 6 & 1 Eliz. 2. c. xliv	1 August 1952
An Act to authorise the South Wales Transport Company Limited to discontinue the services of trolley vehicles authorised by the Llanelly District Traction Acts 1907 to 1936 to amend those Acts and for other purposes.
Nottingham and Derbyshire Traction Act 1952 (repealed)	15 & 16 Geo. 6 & 1 Eliz. 2. c. xlv	1 August 1952
An Act to authorise the Nottinghamshire and Derbyshire Traction Company to discontinue their trolley vehicle services to redefine the objects of the Company to amend or repeal certain enactments relating to the undertaking of the Company to confer further powers upon the Company and for other purposes. (Repealed by Statute Law (Repeals) Act 1995 (c. 44))
North Wales Hydro-Electric Power Act 1952	15 & 16 Geo. 6 & 1 Eliz. 2. c. xlvi	1 August 1952
An Act to confer further powers upon the British Electricity Authority for the construction of works in the counties of Caernarvon and Merioneth and for the acquisition of lands and easements for the purposes thereof or in connection therewith and for other purposes.
Preston Corporation Act 1952 (repealed)	15 & 16 Geo. 6 & 1 Eliz. 2. c. xlvii	1 August 1952
An Act to authorise the corporation of Preston to supply heat to make further provision in reference to the Ribble Navigation water and transport undertakings of the Corporation and the health improvement local government and finances of the borough of Preston and for other purposes. (Repealed by County of Lancashire Act 1984 (c. xxi))
Scottish Amicable Life Assurance Society's Act 1952 (repealed)	15 & 16 Geo. 6 & 1 Eliz. 2. c. xlviii	1 August 1952
An Act to amend the Scottish Amicable Life Assurance Society's Acts 1849 (Note: Scottish Amicable Life Assurance Society's Incorporation Act 1849 (12 & 13 Vict. c. xxii)) and 1919 (Note: Scottish Amicable Life Assurance Society's Order Confirmation Act 1919 (9 & 10 Geo. 5. c. cx)) and regulations of the Society and for other purposes. (Repealed by Scottish Amicable Life Assurance Society's Act 1976 (c. xvi))
West Hartlepool Extension Act 1952 (repealed)	15 & 16 Geo. 6 & 1 Eliz. 2. c. xlix	1 August 1952
An Act to extend the boundaries of the county borough of West Hartlepool and for purposes incidental thereto. (Repealed by County of Cleveland Act 1987 (c. ix))
Essex County Council Act 1952	15 & 16 Geo. 6 & 1 Eliz. 2. c. l	1 August 1952
An Act to confer further powers on the Essex County Council and local authorities in the county of Essex in relation to lands and highways and the local government improvement health and finances of the county to enact provisions with respect to houseboats and public entertainments to make further provision for the superannuation of employees to authorise the mayor aldermen and burgesses of the borough of Dagenham to supply heat and hot water and for other purposes.
Glamorgan County Council Act 1952 (repealed)	15 & 16 Geo. 6 & 1 Eliz. 2. c. li	1 August 1952
An Act to confer further powers on the Glamorgan County Council and local authorities in the county of Glamorgan in relation to lands and highways and the local government improvement health and finances of the county and with respect to places of entertainment to make further provision for the superannuation of employees and for other purposes. (Repealed by West Glamorgan Act 1987 (c. viii))
Hamilton Burgh Order Confirmation Act 1952 (repealed)	15 & 16 Geo. 6 & 1 Eliz. 2. c. lii	30 October 1952
An Act to confirm a Provisional Order under the Private Legislation Procedure (Scotland) Act 1936 relating to Hamilton Burgh. (Repealed by Statute Law (Repeals) Act 1995 (c. 44))
	Hamilton Burgh Order 1952 Provisional Order to increase the amount of the expenditure incurred by the provost magistrates and councillors of the burgh of Hamilton for and in connection with public libraries in the said burgh which may be defrayed out of the burgh rate and for other purposes.	
Lerwick Harbour Order Confirmation Act 1952	15 & 16 Geo. 6 & 1 Eliz. 2. c. liii	30 October 1952
An Act to confirm a Provisional Order under the Private Legislation Procedure (Scotland) Act 1936 relating to Lerwick Harbour.
	Lerwick Harbour Order 1952 Provisional Order to authorise the Trustees of the Port and Harbour of Lerwick to construct new works to redefine and amend the harbour limits to amend existing and grant new powers to the Trustees as to the levying and collection of rates and charges to borrow money and for other purposes.	
Rochester Corporation Act 1952 (repealed)	15 & 16 Geo. 6 & 1 Eliz. 2. c. liv	30 October 1952
An Act to extend the boundaries of the city of Rochester to make further provision with respect to the improvement health local government and finances of the city and for other purposes. (Repealed by County of Kent Act 1981 (c. xviii))

=== Sources ===
- The Public General Acts and Church Assembly Measures of 1952. London: Her Majesty's Stationery Office. 1952. pp. 1–1425 – via Google Books.
- The Public General Acts and Church Assembly Measures of 1952. London: Her Majesty's Stationery Office. 1952. pp. 1–1425 – via Google Books.
- The Journals of the House of Commons (PDF). Vol. 207 (October 1951 – October 1952). pp. 3–384 – via parliament.uk.
- Chronological Table of the Statutes: Covering the Period from 1235 to the End of 1971. London: Her Majesty's Stationery Office. 1972. pp. 1055–1072. ISBN 978-0-11-840096-1 – via Google Books.
- "UK Public General Acts from 1952". legislation.gov.uk. The National Archives.
- "UK Local Acts from 1952". legislation.gov.uk. The National Archives.
- "Chronological Tables of Local Acts: Part 176 (1951-1952)". legislation.gov.uk. The National Archives.

== 1 & 2 Eliz. 2 ==
The second session of the 40th Parliament of the United Kingdom, which met from 4 November 1952 until 29 October 1953.

=== Public general acts ===
Short title	Citation	Royal assent
Long title
Colonial Loans Act 1952 (repealed)	1 & 2 Eliz. 2. c. 1	16 December 1952
An Act to amend the Colonial Loans Act, 1949. (Note: Colonial Loans Act 1949 (12, 13 & 14 Geo. 6. c. 50)) (Repealed by Overseas Development and Co-operation Act 1980 (c. 63))
Civil Contingencies Fund Act 1952 (repealed)	1 & 2 Eliz. 2. c. 2	16 December 1952
An Act to make temporary provision as to the maximum amount of the capital of the Civil Contingencies Fund. (Repealed by Miscellaneous Financial Provisions Act 1955 (4 & 5 Eliz. 2. c. 6))
Public Works Loans Act 1952	1 & 2 Eliz. 2. c. 3	16 December 1952
An Act to grant money for the purpose of certain local loans out of the Local Loans Fund, and for other purposes relating to local loans.
New Valuation Lists (Postponement) Act 1952 (repealed)	1 & 2 Eliz. 2. c. 4	16 December 1952
An Act to provide for the further postponement of the coming into force of new valuation lists under Part III of the Local Government Act, 1948. (Note: Local Government Act 1948 (11 & 12 Geo. 6. c. 26)) (Repealed by Local Government Act 1958 (6 & 7 Eliz. 2. c. 55))
Expiring Laws Continuance Act 1952 (repealed)	1 & 2 Eliz. 2. c. 5	16 December 1952
An Act to continue certain expiring laws. (Repealed by Statute Law Revision Act 1963 (c. 30))

=== Local acts ===
Short title	Citation	Royal assent
Long title
Greenock Corporation Order Confirmation Act 1952	1 & 2 Eliz. 2. c. i	16 December 1952
An Act to confirm a Provisional Order under the Private Legislation Procedure (Scotland) Act 1936 (Note: Private Legislation Procedure (Scotland) Act 1936 (26 Geo. 5 & 1 Edw. 8. c. 52)) relating to Greenock Corporation.
	Greenock Corporation Order 1952 Provisional Order to confer powers on the corporation of Greenock with respect to parks crematorium cabs and the local government health administration and finance of the burgh of Greenock and for other purposes.	

=== Sources ===
- The Public General Acts and Church Assembly Measures of 1952. London: Her Majesty's Stationery Office. 1952. pp. 1426–1437 – via Google Books.
- The Public General Acts and Church Assembly Measures of 1952. London: Her Majesty's Stationery Office. 1952. pp. 1426–1437 – via Google Books.
- The Journals of the House of Commons (PDF). Vol. 208 (November 1952 – October 1953). pp. 3–321 – via parliament.uk.
- Chronological Table of the Statutes: Covering the Period from 1235 to the End of 1971. London: Her Majesty's Stationery Office. 1972. p. 1072. ISBN 978-0-11-840096-1 – via Google Books.
- "UK Public General Acts from 1952". legislation.gov.uk. The National Archives.
- "UK Local Acts from 1952". legislation.gov.uk. The National Archives.
- "Chronological Tables of Local Acts: Part 177 (1952-1954)". legislation.gov.uk. The National Archives.

== See also ==
- List of acts of the Parliament of the United Kingdom
