= List of acts of the Parliament of the United Kingdom from 1957 =

This is a complete list of acts of the Parliament of the United Kingdom for the year 1957.

Note that the first parliament of the United Kingdom was held in 1801; parliaments between 1707 and 1800 were either parliaments of Great Britain or of Ireland. For acts passed up until 1707, see the list of acts of the Parliament of England and the list of acts of the Parliament of Scotland. For acts passed from 1707 to 1800, see the list of acts of the Parliament of Great Britain. See also the list of acts of the Parliament of Ireland.

For acts of the devolved parliaments and assemblies in the United Kingdom, see the list of acts of the Scottish Parliament, the list of acts of the Northern Ireland Assembly, and the list of acts and measures of Senedd Cymru; see also the list of acts of the Parliament of Northern Ireland.

The number shown after each act's title is its chapter number. Acts passed before 1963 are cited using this number, preceded by the year(s) of the reign during which the relevant parliamentary session was held; thus the Union with Ireland Act 1800 is cited as "39 & 40 Geo. 3 c. 67", meaning the 67th act passed during the session that started in the 39th year of the reign of George III and which finished in the 40th year of that reign. Note that the modern convention is to use Arabic numerals in citations (thus "41 Geo. 3" rather than "41 Geo. III"). Acts of the last session of the Parliament of Great Britain and the first session of the Parliament of the United Kingdom are both cited as "41 Geo. 3". Acts passed from 1963 onwards are simply cited by calendar year and chapter number.

== 5 & 6 Eliz. 2 ==
Continuing the second session of the 41st Parliament of the United Kingdom, which met from 6 November 1956 until 1 November 1957.

=== Public general acts ===
Short title	Citation	Royal assent
Long title
Ghana Independence Act 1957	5 & 6 Eliz. 2. c. 6	7 February 1957
An Act to make provision for, and in connection with, the attainment by the Gold Coast of fully responsible status within the British Commonwealth of Nations.
Consolidated Fund Act 1957 (repealed)	5 & 6 Eliz. 2. c. 7	26 February 1957
An Act to apply a sum out of the Consolidated Fund to the service of the year ending on the thirty-first day of March, one thousand nine hundred and fifty-seven. (Repealed by Statute Law Revision Act 1964 (c. 79))
Commonwealth Settlement Act 1957 (repealed)	5 & 6 Eliz. 2. c. 8	26 February 1957
An Act to extend the period for which the Secretary of State may make contributions under schemes agreed under section one of the Empire Settlement Act, 1922. (Note: Empire Settlement Act 1922 (12 & 13 Geo. 5. c. 13)) (Repealed by Commonwealth Settlement Act 1962 (10 & 11 Eliz. 2. c. 17))
Transport (Railway Finances) Act 1957 (repealed)	5 & 6 Eliz. 2. c. 9	26 February 1957
An Act to make temporary provision authorising the British Transport Commission to meet interest and other revenue charges by borrowing, and modifying the requirement of the Transport Act, 1947, (Note: Transport Act 1947 (10 & 11 Geo. 6. c. 49)) as to the sufficiency of the Commission's revenue to meet revenue charges, to authorise advances out of the Consolidated Fund of sums so borrowed, and for purposes connected therewith. (Repealed by Transport Act 1962 (10 & 11 Eliz. 2. c. 46))
Consolidated Fund (No. 2) Act 1957 (repealed)	5 & 6 Eliz. 2. c. 10	21 March 1957
An Act to apply certain sums out of the Consolidated Fund to the service of the years ending on the thirty-first day of March, one thousand nine hundred and fifty-six, one thousand nine hundred and fifty-seven and one thousand nine hundred and fifty-eight. (Repealed by Statute Law Revision Act 1964 (c. 79))
Homicide Act 1957	5 & 6 Eliz. 2. c. 11	21 March 1957
An Act to make for England and Wales (and for courts-martial wherever sitting) amendments of the law relating to homicide and the trial and punishment of murder, and for Scotland amendments of the law relating to the trial and punishment of murder and attempts to murder.
Public Trustee (Fees) Act 1957	5 & 6 Eliz. 2. c. 12	21 March 1957
An Act to make further provision as to the fees chargeable by the Public Trustee, and for purposes connected therewith.
Patents Act 1957 (repealed)	5 & 6 Eliz. 2. c. 13	21 March 1957
An Act to provide for extending time limits for certain purposes relating to applications for patents; to validate extensions of time under section six of the Patents, Designs, Copyright and Trade Marks (Emergency) Act, 1939, (Note: Patents, Designs, Copyright and Trade Marks (Emergency) Act 1939 (2 & 3 Geo. 6. c. 107)) in connection with such applications in so far as any such extensions may have been invalid; and for purposes connected with the matters aforesaid. (Repealed by Patents Act 1977 (c. 37))
Northern Ireland (Compensation for Compulsory Purchase) Act 1957 (repealed)	5 & 6 Eliz. 2. c. 14	21 March 1957
An Act to enable the Parliament of Northern Ireland to make, in relation to land in Northern Ireland, provision for purposes similar to those of section fifty-three of the Town and Country Planning Act, 1947. (Note: Town and Country Planning Act 1947 (10 & 11 Geo. 6. c. 51)) (Repealed by Northern Ireland Act 1962 (10 & 11 Eliz. 2. c. 30))
Nurses Act 1957 (repealed)	5 & 6 Eliz. 2. c. 15	21 March 1957
An Act to consolidate certain enactments relating to nurses and assistant nurses for the sick. (Repealed by Nurses, Midwives and Health Visitors Act 1979 (c. 36) and National Health Service (Preservation of Boards of Governors) Order 1983 (SI 1983/304))
Nurses Agencies Act 1957 (repealed)	5 & 6 Eliz. 2. c. 16	21 March 1957
An Act to consolidate certain enactments relating to agencies for the supply of nurses. (Repealed by Care Standards Act 2000 (c. 14))
Rating and Valuation Act 1957 (repealed)	5 & 6 Eliz. 2. c. 17	21 March 1957
An Act to reduce, during the currency of existing valuation lists, the rateable value of certain hereditaments; to make further provision as to the amounts payable by way of rates or in lieu of rates by the British Transport Commission, the Central Electricity Authority and Area Gas Boards; to amend the provisions of the Local Government Act, 1948, (Note: Local Government Act 1948 (11 & 12 Geo. 6. c. 26)) as to the ascertainment of the rateable value for an area; and for purposes connected with the matters aforesaid. (Repealed by General Rate Act 1967 (c. 9))
Customs Duties (Dumping and Subsidies) Act 1957 (repealed)	5 & 6 Eliz. 2. c. 18	17 April 1957
An Act to authorise the imposition of duties of customs where goods have been dumped or subsidised, and for connected purposes. (Repealed by Customs Duties (Dumping and Subsidies) Act 1969 (c. 16))
Public Health Officers (Deputies) Act 1957 (repealed)	5 & 6 Eliz. 2. c. 19	17 April 1957
An Act to dispense with the consent of the Minister of Health to the appointment under the Local Government Act, 1933, (Note: Local Government Act 1933 (23 & 24 Geo. 5. c. 51)) or the London Government Act, 1939, (Note: London Government Act 1939 (2 & 3 Geo. 6. c. 40)) of deputies of medical officers of health and deputies of public health inspectors. (Repealed by Local Government Act 1972 (c. 70))
House of Commons Disqualification Act 1957 (repealed)	5 & 6 Eliz. 2. c. 20	17 April 1957
An Act to make provision for disqualifying the holders of specified offices for membership of the House of Commons, and to repeal the enactments providing for the disqualification of the holders of offices or places of profit under the Crown and other offices, of persons having pensions from the Crown and of persons contracting with the Crown for or on account of the public service, and certain enactments disqualifying members of that House for holding other offices; to make corresponding provision in respect of the Senate and House of Commons of Northern Ireland; and for purposes connected with the matters aforesaid. (Repealed by House of Commons Disqualification Act 1975 (c. 24), Northern Ireland Assembly Disqualification Act 1975 (c. 25) and Ministers of the Crown Act 1975 (c. 26))
Cinematograph Films Act 1957 (repealed)	5 & 6 Eliz. 2. c. 21	17 April 1957
An Act to provide for the imposition of a levy on exhibitors of cinematograph films and for the making from the proceeds thereof of payments to, or for the benefit of, makers of British cinematograph films and to the Children's Film Foundation Limited; to amend the law relating to the functions and finances of the National Film Finance Corporation; to extend the period during which, under section one of the Cinematograph Films Act, 1948, (Note: Cinematograph Films Act 1948 (11 & 12 Geo. 6. c. 23)) the inclusion of British cinematograph films amongst registered films exhibited to the public in theatres in Great Britain is obligatory and increase the maximum amount of certain fees payable under the Cinematograph Films Act, 1938; (Note: Cinematograph Films Act 1938 (1 & 2 Geo. 6. c. 17)) and for purposes connected with the matters aforesaid. (Repealed by Film Levy Finance Act 1981 (c. 16))
White Fish and Herring Industries Act 1957 (repealed)	5 & 6 Eliz. 2. c. 22	17 April 1957
An Act to amend the provisions of the White Fish and Herring Industries Act, 1953, (Note: White Fish and Herring Industries Act 1953 (1 & 2 Eliz. 2. c. 17)) relating to grants by the White Fish Authority and the Herring Industry Board towards new vessels and engines and to the white fish subsidy; to provide a subsidy in respect of herring; and for purposes connected with the matters aforesaid. (Repealed by Sea Fish Industry Act 1970 (c. 11))
Export Guarantees Act 1957 (repealed)	5 & 6 Eliz. 2. c. 23	6 June 1957
An Act to amend the Export Guarantees Acts, 1949 to 1952. (Repealed by Export Guarantees Act 1968 (c. 26))
House of Commons Members' Fund Act 1957 (repealed)	5 & 6 Eliz. 2. c. 24	6 June 1957
An Act to authorise the payment out of moneys provided by Parliament of annual contributions towards the House of Commons Members' Fund and to extend the powers of investment of the trustees of that Fund. (Repealed by House of Commons Members' Fund Act 2016 (c. 18))
Rent Act 1957	5 & 6 Eliz. 2. c. 25	6 June 1957
An Act to amend the Rent and Mortgage Interest Restrictions Acts, 1920 to 1939, the Rent of Furnished Houses Control (Scotland) Act, 1943, (Note: Rent of Furnished Houses Control (Scotland) Act 1943 (6 & 7 Geo. 6. c. 44)) the Furnished Houses (Rent Control) Act, 1946, (Note: Furnished Houses (Rent Control) Act 1946 (9 & 10 Geo. 6. c. 34)) the Housing (Repairs and Rents) (Scotland) Act, 1954, (Note: Housing (Repairs and Rents) (Scotland) Act 1954 (2 & 3 Eliz. 2. c. 50)) and certain other enactments relating to the control of rents and the right to retain possession of houses; to provide a minimum length for notice to terminate residential lettings; and for purposes connected with the matters aforesaid. (Repealed for Scotland by Rent (Scotland) Act 1971 (c. 28))
National Insurance Act 1957 (repealed)	5 & 6 Eliz. 2. c. 26	6 June 1957
An Act to provide for modifying the provisions of the National Insurance Act, 1946, (Note: National Insurance Act 1946 (9 & 10 Geo. 6. c. 67)) under which persons are treated as having retired; to amend the conditions of entitlement to certain benefits payable out of the National Insurance Fund or the Industrial Injuries Fund; to provide for an additional description of benefit under the aforesaid Act in respect of a child; to amend the provisions of that Act as to contributions in respect of periods as an insured person under the age of sixteen; and for purposes connected with the matters aforesaid. (Repealed by Statute Law Revision (Consequential Repeals) Act 1965 (c. 55), Workmen's Compensation and Benefit (Amendment) Act 1965 (c. 79), Industrial Injuries and Diseases (Old Cases) Act 1967 (c. 34) and Social Security Act 1973 (c. 38))
Solicitors Act 1957 (repealed)	5 & 6 Eliz. 2. c. 27	6 June 1957
An Act to consolidate the Solicitors Acts, 1932 to 1956, and certain other enactments relating to solicitors, with corrections and improvements made under the Consolidation of Enactments (Procedure) Act, 1949. (Note: Consolidation of Enactments (Procedure) Act 1949 (12, 13 & 14 Geo. 6. c. 33)) (Repealed by Solicitors Act 1974 (c. 47))
Dentists Act 1957 (repealed)	5 & 6 Eliz. 2. c. 28	6 June 1957
An Act to consolidate the enactments relating to dentists and other dental workers with corrections and improvements authorised under the Consolidation of Enactments (Procedure) Act, 1949. (Repealed by Dentists Act 1984 (c. 24))
Magistrates' Courts Act 1957 (repealed)	5 & 6 Eliz. 2. c. 29	6 June 1957
An Act to make provision for persons charged with certain summary offences to plead guilty without appearing before the court; to provide for the proof before magistrates' courts of certain matters; to restrict the power of such courts to issue a warrant for the arrest of an accused person on his failing to appear; to extend the power of such courts with respect to the mitigation of penalties; and for other purposes connected with the purposes aforesaid. (Repealed by Magistrates' Courts Act 1980 (c. 43))
Church of Scotland (Property and Endowments) (Amendment) Act 1957 (repealed)	5 & 6 Eliz. 2. c. 30	6 June 1957
An Act to amend section thirty-six of the Church of Scotland (Property and Endowments) Act, 1925, (Note: Church of Scotland (Property and Endowments) Act 1925 (15 & 16 Geo. 5. c. 33)) in its application to benefices with more than one incumbency. (Repealed by Abolition of Feudal Tenure etc. (Scotland) Act 2000 (asp 5))
Occupiers' Liability Act 1957	5 & 6 Eliz. 2. c. 31	6 June 1957
An Act to amend the law of England and Wales as to the liability of occupiers and others for injury or damage resulting to persons or goods lawfully on any land or other property from dangers due to the state of the property or to things done or omitted to be done there, to make provision as to the operation in relation to the Crown of laws made by the Parliament of Northern Ireland for similar purposes or otherwise amending the law of tort, and for purposes connected therewith.
Naval and Marine Reserves Pay Act 1957 (repealed)	5 & 6 Eliz. 2. c. 32	6 June 1957
An Act to make further provision with respect to the pay, bounty and allowances of officers and men of the naval and marine reserves (including officers of reserve to the royal navy) and for purposes connected therewith. (Repealed by Reserve Forces Act 1980 (c. 9))
New Streets Act 1951 (Amendment) Act 1957 (repealed)	5 & 6 Eliz. 2. c. 33	6 June 1957
An Act to amend the New Streets Act, 1951. (Note: New Streets Act 1951 (14 & 15 Geo. 6. c. 40)) (Repealed by Highways Act 1959 (7 & 8 Eliz. 2. c. 25))
National Health Service Contributions Act 1957 (repealed)	5 & 6 Eliz. 2. c. 34	17 July 1957
An Act to make provision for requiring persons who pay, or are liable to pay, contributions under the National Insurance Acts, 1946 to 1956, to pay contributions towards the cost of the national health service, and, in consequence thereof, to reduce the rates of contributions under those Acts, and to discontinue the making of payments out of the National Insurance Fund in respect of the national health service under section thirty-seven of the National Insurance Act, 1946; and for purposes connected with the matters aforesaid. (Repealed by Statute Law Revision (Consequential Repeals) Act 1965 (c. 55))
Maintenance Agreements Act 1957 (repealed)	5 & 6 Eliz. 2. c. 35	17 July 1957
An Act to make provision with respect to the validity and alteration by the court of financial arrangements in connection with agreements between the parties to a marriage, whether made during the continuance or after the dissolution or annulment of the marriage, for the purposes of those parties' living separately; and for purposes connected therewith. (Repealed by Matrimonial Causes Act 1965 (c. 72))
Cheques Act 1957	5 & 6 Eliz. 2. c. 36	17 July 1957
An Act to amend the law relating to cheques and certain other instruments.
Superannuation Act 1957 (repealed)	5 & 6 Eliz. 2. c. 37	17 July 1957
An Act to make further provision as to gratuities payable in respect of persons employed in the civil service of the State otherwise than in an established capacity and as to the application of the Superannuation Acts to persons entering the civil service of the State after having been in other employment. (Repealed by Superannuation Act 1965 (c. 74))
Housing and Town Development (Scotland) Act 1957	5 & 6 Eliz. 2. c. 38	17 July 1957
An Act to make new provision with respect to contributions out of the Exchequer and by local authorities in respect of housing accommodation provided or improved in Scotland; to enable Scottish local authorities to provide housing accommodation and other development in relief of the needs of districts other than their own; to make additional provision as respects Scotland for the making of payments in respect of unfit houses which have been well maintained, to provide as respects Scotland for the making and keeping by local authorities of registers of maximum rents of dwellings in respect of which improvement grants have been made, and for the simplifying of the procedure for the completion of the compulsory acquisition of land under certain enactments relating to housing; to amend certain provisions of the Housing (Scotland) Act, 1950; (Note: Housing (Scotland) Act 1950 (14 Geo. 6. c. 34)) to extend section nineteen of the Town and Country Planning (Scotland) Act, 1945; (Note: Town and Country Planning (Scotland) Act 1945 (8 & 9 Geo. 6. c. 33)) and for purposes connected with the matters aforesaid.
Legitimation (Re-registration of Birth) Act 1957 (repealed)	5 & 6 Eliz. 2. c. 39	17 July 1957
An Act to extend the operation of section fourteen and paragraph (d) of section thirty-six of the Births and Deaths Registration Act, 1953, (Note: Births and Deaths Registration Act 1953 (1 & 2 Eliz. 2. c. 20)) and of the Schedule to the Legitimacy Act, 1926; (Note: Legitimacy Act 1926 (16 & 17 Geo. 5. c. 60)) and for purposes connected with that matter. (Repealed by Statute Law (Repeals) Act 1974 (c. 22) and Legitimacy Act 1976 (c. 31))
Thermal Insulation (Industrial Buildings) Act 1957 (repealed)	5 & 6 Eliz. 2. c. 40	17 July 1957
An Act to make provision for the thermal insulation of industrial buildings; and for purposes connected therewith. (Repealed by Building (Inner London) Regulations 1985 (SI 1985/1936))
Advertisements (Hire-Purchase) Act 1957 (repealed)	5 & 6 Eliz. 2. c. 41	17 July 1957
An Act to make provision as to the information to be included in advertisements displayed or issued in connection with hire-purchase or credit sale; and for purposes connected with the matter aforesaid. (Repealed by Advertisements (Hire-Purchase) Act 1967 (c. 42))
Parish Councils Act 1957	5 & 6 Eliz. 2. c. 42	17 July 1957
An Act to make further provision as to the constitution of parish councils, and as to the powers of parish councils and parish meetings, in rural parishes in England and Wales.
Representation of the People (Amendment) Act 1957 (repealed)	5 & 6 Eliz. 2. c. 43	17 July 1957
An Act to amend the Representation of the People Act, 1949, (Note: Representation of the People Act 1949 (12, 13 & 14 Geo. 6. c. 68)) by assimilating the limitation on election expenses for candidates at parliamentary elections in constituencies in Northern Ireland to the limitation on those expenses for candidates at such elections in constituencies in Great Britain. (Repealed by Representation of the People Act 1969 (c. 15))
National Health Service (Amendment) Act 1957 (repealed)	5 & 6 Eliz. 2. c. 44	17 July 1957
An Act to empower local health authorities to make available, for reward, ambulance services provided by them in pursuance of the National Health Service Act, 1946, (Note: National Health Service Act 1946 (9 & 10 Geo. 6. c. 81)) and for purposes connected therewith. (Repealed by National Health Service Reorganisation Act 1973 (c. 32))
Exchequer and Audit Departments Act 1957 (repealed)	5 & 6 Eliz. 2. c. 45	17 July 1957
An Act to make further provision as to the salary of the Comptroller and Auditor General and the performance of his duties. (Repealed by Budget Responsibility and National Audit Act 2011 (c. 4))
Judicial Offices (Salaries and Pensions) Act 1957 (repealed)	5 & 6 Eliz. 2. c. 46	17 July 1957
An Act to provide for increasing the salaries of the recorders of Liverpool and Manchester, of county court judges and of metropolitan police magistrates; to make further provision as to the pensions of the said recorders; and for purposes connected with the matters aforesaid. (Repealed by Administration of Justice Act 1973 (c. 15))
Ministerial Salaries Act 1957 (repealed)	5 & 6 Eliz. 2. c. 47	17 July 1957
An Act to make further provision with respect to the salaries of certain Ministers and of the Leader of the Opposition; to provide for the extension to Ministers of the provisions of section forty-one of the Superannuation Act, 1949, (Note: Superannuation Act 1949 (12, 13 & 14 Geo. 6. c. 44)) relating to injuries incurred and diseases contracted in the discharge of duty; and for purposes connected therewith. (Repealed by Ministerial Salaries Consolidation Act 1965 (c. 58))
Electricity Act 1957 (repealed)	5 & 6 Eliz. 2. c. 48	17 July 1957
An Act to provide for the dissolution of the Central Electricity Authority and the establishment of a Central Electricity Generating Board and an Electricity Council, and for the transfer of functions of the said Authority to that Board or Council or to the Minister of Power; to make further provision as to other matters relating to the supply of electricity; and for purposes connected with the matters aforesaid. (Repealed by Electricity Act 1989 (c. 29))
Finance Act 1957	5 & 6 Eliz. 2. c. 49	31 July 1957
An Act to grant certain duties, to alter other duties, and to amend the law relating to the National Debt and the Public Revenue, and to make further provision in connection with Finance.
Army (Conditions of Enlistment) Act 1957 (repealed)	5 & 6 Eliz. 2. c. 50	31 July 1957
An Act to make further provision as to the transfer to the reserve or determination of service of persons serving in the army for a term of twenty-two years. (Repealed by Army Terms of Service Regulations 1967 (SI 1967/1018))
Road Transport Lighting Act 1957 (repealed)	5 & 6 Eliz. 2. c. 51	31 July 1957
An Act to consolidate certain enactments relating to the lighting of vehicles on roads. (Repealed by Road Traffic Act 1972 (c. 20))
Geneva Conventions Act 1957	5 & 6 Eliz. 2. c. 52	31 July 1957
An Act to enable effect to be given to certain international conventions done at Geneva on the twelfth day of August, nineteen hundred and forty-nine, and for purposes connected therewith.
Naval Discipline Act 1957 (repealed)	5 & 6 Eliz. 2. c. 53	31 July 1957
An Act to make provision for the discipline of the Navy, and for other purposes connected with the Navy. (Repealed by Armed Forces Act 2006 (c. 52))
Tanganyika Agricultural Corporation Act 1957 (repealed)	5 & 6 Eliz. 2. c. 54	31 July 1957
An Act to provide for the making of grants to the Governor of Tanganyika for the purpose of providing funds for the Tanganyika Agricultural Corporation; and for purposes connected with the matter aforesaid. (Repealed by Statute Law (Repeals) Act 1976 (c. 16))
Affiliation Proceedings Act 1957 (repealed)	5 & 6 Eliz. 2. c. 55	31 July 1957
An Act to consolidate the enactments relating to bastardy, with corrections and improvements made under the Consolidation of Enactments (Procedure) Act, 1949. (Repealed by Family Law Reform Act 1987 (c. 42))
Housing Act 1957 (repealed)	5 & 6 Eliz. 2. c. 56	31 July 1957
An Act to consolidate the enactments relating to housing with the exception of certain provisions relating to financial matters. (Repealed by Housing (Consequential Provisions) Act 1985 (c. 71))
Agriculture Act 1957	5 & 6 Eliz. 2. c. 57	31 July 1957
An Act to make further provision for guaranteed prices and assured markets for producers of agricultural produce in the United Kingdom; to authorise the payment of grants in respect of long-term improvements of agricultural land within the United Kingdom and in respect of the costs of certain transactions concerning such land; to make fresh provision for the development of the pig industry in Great Britain (including the production, processing, manufacture and distribution of pig products); to authorise payments into the Exchequer of Northern Ireland on account of expenses incurred for the benefit of producers of agricultural produce in Northern Ireland; and for purposes connected with the matters aforesaid.
Registration of Births, Deaths and Marriages (Special Provisions) Act 1957	5 & 6 Eliz. 2. c. 58	31 July 1957
An Act to provide for the registration of births, deaths and marriages occurring out of the United Kingdom among members of the armed forces and certain other persons, or occurring on board certain ships or aircraft; and for purposes connected with the matters aforesaid.
Coal Mining (Subsidence) Act 1957 (repealed)	5 & 6 Eliz. 2. c. 59	31 July 1957
An Act to provide for the execution of remedial works and the making of payments in respect of damage caused by subsidence resulting from the working and getting of coal or of coal and other minerals worked therewith; for the execution of works to prevent or reduce such damage; for the carrying out of remedial or preventive measures in connection with land drainage affected or likely to be affected by such damage; and for purposes connected with the matters aforesaid. (Repealed by Coal Mining Subsidence Act 1991 (c. 45))
Federation of Malaya Independence Act 1957	5 & 6 Eliz. 2. c. 60	31 July 1957
An Act to make provision for and in connection with the establishment of the Federation of Malaya as an independent sovereign country within the Commonwealth.
Winfrith Heath Act 1957 (repealed)	5 & 6 Eliz. 2. c. 61	31 July 1957
An Act to extinguish rights of common and other rights, in so far as any such rights subsist in or over certain land in the parish of Winfrith Newburgh in the county of Dorset; to provide for determining the nature of the said rights, in so far as they subsist in or over that land, and the persons entitled thereto, and to provide for compensation in respect of the extinguishment thereof; and for purposes connected with the matters aforesaid. (Repealed by Statute Law (Repeals) Act 1976 (c. 16))
Governors' Pensions Act 1957 (repealed)	5 & 6 Eliz. 2. c. 62	31 July 1957
An Act to consolidate the Governors' Pensions Acts, 1911 to 1956. (Repealed by Overseas Pensions Act 1973 (c. 21))
Appropriation Act 1957 (repealed)	5 & 6 Eliz. 2. c. 63	1 August 1957
An Act to apply a sum out of the Consolidated Fund to the service of the year ending on the thirty-first day of March, one thousand nine hundred and fifty-eight and to appropriate the supplies granted in this Session of Parliament. (Repealed by Statute Law Revision Act 1964 (c. 79) and Superannuation Act 1972 (c. 11))

=== Local acts ===
Short title	Citation	Royal assent
Long title
Wakefield Corporation Act 1957	5 & 6 Eliz. 2. c. iii	17 April 1957
An Act to authorise the development and disposal of disused burial grounds in the city of Wakefield and to authorise the mayor aldermen and citizens of the said city to construct street works and to purchase lands compulsorily and for other purposes.
Liverpool Hydraulic Power Act 1957	5 & 6 Eliz. 2. c. iv	17 April 1957
An Act to authorise the Liverpool Hydraulic Power Company to construct new works to repeal the temporary limitation on the powers of charge of the company to repeal and modify existing agreements to empower the company and the London Hydraulic Power Company to borrow from and lend moneys to each other and for other purposes.
Port of London Act 1957 (repealed)	5 & 6 Eliz. 2. c. v	17 April 1957
An Act to confer further powers on the Port of London Authority and for other purposes. (Repealed by Port of London Act 1968 (c. xxxii))
Blyth Harbour Act 1957	5 & 6 Eliz. 2. c. vi	6 June 1957
An Act to alter the constitution of the Blyth Harbour Commissioners to increase the maximum rates tolls and charges leviable by the Commissioners to confer upon the Commissioners further powers with respect to the raising of money and for other purposes.
Barclays Bank D.C.O Act 1957 (repealed)	5 & 6 Eliz. 2. c. vii	6 June 1957
An Act to make provision respecting the articles or regulations for the government of Barclays Bank D.C.O. to make provision with respect to its general meetings to increase its authorised capital and for other purposes. (Repealed by Barclays Bank Act 1984 (c. x))
Cattedown Wharves Act 1957	5 & 6 Eliz. 2. c. viii	6 June 1957
An Act to make further provision with respect to dues rates and charges demandable at Cattedown Wharves Plymouth and for other purposes.
Marine Society Act 1957	5 & 6 Eliz. 2. c. ix	6 June 1957
An Act to confer powers on the Marine Society and for other purposes.
City of London (Various Powers) Act 1957	5 & 6 Eliz. 2. c. x	6 June 1957
An Act to make further provision with respect to ward elections in the city of London to confer further powers on the corporation of London with respect to the provision of garaging and parking accommodation for vehicles and for other purposes.
Sunderland Corporation Act 1957	5 & 6 Eliz. 2. c. xi	6 June 1957
An Act to empower the mayor aldermen and burgesses of the borough of Sunderland to discontinue and abandoned the ferry across the river Wear commonly known as the Sunderland Ferry to make further provision for the improvement health and local government of the borough and for other purposes.
Aberdeen Harbour (Superannuation) Order Confirmation Act 1957 (repealed)	5 & 6 Eliz. 2. c. xii	17 July 1957
An Act to confirm a Provisional Order under the Private Legislation Procedure (Scotland) Act 1936 (Note: Private Legislation Procedure (Scotland) Act 1936 (26 Geo. 5 & 1 Edw. 8. c. 52)) relating to Aberdeen Harbour (Superannuation). (Repealed by Aberdeen Harbour Order Confirmation Act 1960 (9 & 10 Eliz. 2. c. i))
	Aberdeen Harbour (Superannuation) Order 1957 Provisional Order to amend the provisions of the Aberdeen Harbour (Superannuation) Order 1939 and for other purposes.	
Baird Trust Order Confirmation Act 1957 (repealed)	5 & 6 Eliz. 2. c. xiii	17 July 1957
An Act to confirm a Provisional Order under the Private Legislation Procedure (Scotland) Act 1936 relating to the Baird Trust. (Repealed by Baird Trust Reorganisation Act 2005 (asp 11))
	Baird Trust Order 1957 Provisional Order to extend the powers of the Baird Trust with respect to the investment of the funds belonging to or held by them to amend the provisions of the Baird Trust Order 1939 with respect to the Baird Lecture and otherwise in regard to the management and regulation of the said Trust and for other purposes.	
Glasgow Corporation Order Confirmation Act 1957	5 & 6 Eliz. 2. c. xiv	17 July 1957
An Act to confirm a Provisional Order under the Private Legislation Procedure (Scotland) Act 1936 relating to Glasgow Corporation.
	Glasgow Corporation Order 1957 Provisional Order to confirm an agreement between the corporation of the city of Glasgow and the British Transport Commission and certain companies with respect to passenger transport services in the city of Glasgow and adjoining districts and to authorise the Corporation to abandon certain tramways to extend the time for the construction of the tunnels under the river Clyde and relative works authorised by the Glasgow Corporation Order 1948 and for the compulsory purchase of lands for certain sewers to enact the provisions as to the Dougalston Estate of the Corporation to make provision as to the application to the Corporation and the police force for the city of the Police (Scotland) Act 1956 (Note: Police (Scotland) Act 1956 (4 & 5 Eliz. 2. c. 26)) and for other purposes.	
Kilmarnock Corporation Order Confirmation Act 1957	5 & 6 Eliz. 2. c. xv	17 July 1957
An Act to confirm a Provisional Order under the Private Legislation Procedure (Scotland) Act 1936 relating to Kilmarnock Corporation.
	Kilmarnock Corporation Order 1957 Provisional Order to confer further powers upon the provost magistrates and councillors of the burgh of Kilmarnock with respect to the local government of the burgh.	
Aberdeen Corporation Order Confirmation Act 1957	5 & 6 Eliz. 2. c. xvi	17 July 1957
An Act to confirm a Provisional Order under the Private Legislation Procedure (Scotland) Act 1936 relating to Aberdeen Corporation.
	Aberdeen Corporation Order 1957 Provisional Order to authorise the Corporation of the city of Aberdeen to acquire lands and to make a street improvement and to use the said lands together with certain other lands for the purposes thereof and for the provision of new municipal buildings and for other purposes.	
University of Exeter Act 1957	5 & 6 Eliz. 2. c. xvii	17 July 1957
An Act to dissolve the University College of the South West of England and to transfer all the rights property and liabilities of that college to the University of Exeter and for other purposes.
Buckinghamshire County Council Act 1957	5 & 6 Eliz. 2. c. xviii	17 July 1957
An Act to confer further powers on the Buckinghamshire County Council and local authorities of the county of Buckingham in relation to lands and highways and the local government improvement health and finances of the county to make further provision with reference to the Buckinghamshire Quarter Sessions and for other purposes.
London County Council (Money) Act 1957	5 & 6 Eliz. 2. c. xix	17 July 1957
An Act to regulate the expenditure on capital account and lending of money by the London County Council during the financial period from the first day of April nineteen hundred and fifty-seven to the thirtieth day of September nineteen hundred and fifty-eight and for other purposes.
Croydon Corporation Act 1957 (repealed)	5 & 6 Eliz. 2. c. xx	17 July 1957
An Act to confer upon the mayor aldermen and burgesses of the borough of Croydon rights of appeal in regard to the deposit and disposal of refuse and other matter and for other purposes. (Repealed by Croydon Corporation Act 1960 (8 & 9 Eliz. 2. c. xl))
Tyne Improvement Act 1957	5 & 6 Eliz. 2. c. xxi	17 July 1957
An Act to empower the Tyne Improvement Commissioners to execute works and to fill in their Northumberland Dock and for other purposes.
Greenock Port and Harbours Order Confirmation Act 1957	5 & 6 Eliz. 2. c. xxii	31 July 1957
An Act to confirm a Provisional Order under the Private Legislation Procedure (Scotland) Act 1936 relating to Greenock Port and Harbours.
	Greenock Port and Harbours Provisional Order to confer power on the Trustees of the Port and Harbours of Greenock to acquire certain lands by agreement to repeal certain provisions of the Greenock Port and Harbours Order 1943 to authorise the Trustees to supply ships with electricity to make byelaws to make adjustments in the accounts of the Harbour Trust and for other purposes.	
Clyde Navigation Order Confirmation Act 1957	5 & 6 Eliz. 2. c. xxiii	31 July 1957
An Act to confirm a Provisional Order under the Private Legislation Procedure (Scotland) Act 1936 relating to Clyde Navigation.
	Clyde Navigation Order 1957 Provisional Order to authorise the Trustees of the Clyde Navigation to execute new works to amend the provisions of the Clyde Navigation Acts 1929 (Note: Clyde Navigation Act 1929 (20 & 21 Geo. 5. c. xx)) and 1950 (Note: Clyde Navigation Order Confirmation Act 1950 (14 Geo. 6. c. xxx)) relating to rates and for other purposes.	
Ministry of Housing and Local Government Provisional Order Confirmation (County of Berks (Consent to Letting)) Act 1957	5 & 6 Eliz. 2. c. xxiv	31 July 1957
An Act to confirm a Provisional Order of the Minister of Housing and Local Government relating to certain land in the county of Berks.
	County of Berks (Consent to Letting) Order 1957 Provisional Order to enable the county council of Berks to let certain land.	
Reading Corporation (Trolley Vehicles) Provisional Order Act 1957	5 & 6 Eliz. 2. c. xxv	31 July 1957
An Act to confirm a Provisional Order made by the Minister of Transport and Civil Aviation under the Reading Corporation Act 1935 (Note: Reading Corporation Act 1935 (25 & 26 Geo. 5. c. xc)) relating to Reading Corporation trolley vehicles.
	Reading Corporation (Trolley Vehicles) Order 1957 Provisional Order authorising the mayor aldermen and burgesses of the borough of Reading to use trolley vehicles upon additional routes in the borough of Reading.	
Doncaster Corporation (Trolley Vehicles) Provisional Order Act 1957 (repealed)	5 & 6 Eliz. 2. c. xxvi	31 July 1957
An Act to confirm a Provisional Order made by the Minister of Transport and Civil Aviation under Doncaster Corporation Act 1926 (Note: Doncaster Corporation Act 1926 (16 & 17 Geo. 5. c. xxvii)) relating to Doncaster Corporation Trolley Vehicles. (Repealed by Statute Law (Repeals) Act 1989 (c. 43))
	Doncaster Corporation (Trolley Vehicles) Order 1957 Provisional Order authorising the mayor aldermen and burgesses of the county borough of Doncaster to use trolley vehicles upon additional routes in the county borough of Doncaster.	
Durham County Council (Barmston-Coxgreen Footbridge) Act 1957	5 & 6 Eliz. 2. c. xxvii	31 July 1957
An Act to empower the Durham County Council to construct a footbridge over the river Wear to authorise the discontinuance and abandonment of the ferry across that river commonly known as the Barmston-Coxgreen Ferry and for other purposes.
Tamar Bridge Act 1957	5 & 6 Eliz. 2. c. xxviii	31 July 1957
An Act to empower the county council of the administrative county of Cornwall and the lord mayor aldermen and citizens of the city of Plymouth to construct a bridge across the river Tamar with approach roads and other works and to purchase lands compulsorily for those and other purposes to vest in the said county council and the said lord mayor aldermen and citizens jointly the Torpoint ferry undertaking of the said county council to discontinue the Saltash ferry and for other purposes.
B P Trading Act 1957 or the B.P. Trading Act 1957	5 & 6 Eliz. 2. c. xxix	31 July 1957
An Act to empower B P Trading Limited to construct works and to acquire lands and for other purposes.
Portslade and Southwick Outfall Sewerage Board Act 1957	5 & 6 Eliz. 2. c. xxx	31 July 1957
An Act to make provision for the terms upon which sewage from the urban district of Shoreham-by-Sea is to be taken and discharged by the Portslade and Southwick Outfall Sewerage Board and for other purposes.
Barry Corporation Act 1957	5 & 6 Eliz. 2. c. xxxi	31 July 1957
An Act to make further provision for the improvement health and local government of the borough of Barry and for other purposes.
Workington Harbour and Dock (Transfer) Act 1957	5 & 6 Eliz. 2. c. xxxii	31 July 1957
An Act to transfer to the United Steel Companies Limited the undertaking of the Workington Harbour and Dock Board to constitute that company the port and harbour authority for the port and harbour of Workington in the county of Cumberland and to extend and redefine the limits of the said port and harbour to confer powers on that company in relation to the undertaking to make provisions as to the rates which may be demanded and taken by that company in relation to the user of the undertaking to repeal the Acts relating to the board's undertaking and for other purposes.
British Transport Commission Act 1957	5 & 6 Eliz. 2. c. xxxiii	31 July 1957
An Act to empower the British Transport Commission to construct works and to acquire lands to authorise the closing for navigation of portions of certain inland waterways to make provision with respect to the transfer to the corporation of Bristol of Portishead Pier to authorise the sale to the Lincolnshire Road Car Company Limited of part of the churchyard of Saint Mark Lincoln to extend the time for the compulsory purchase of certain lands and the completion of a certain work to confer further powers on the Commission to dissolve the Dundalk Newry and Greenore Railway Company (Note: The Dundalk, Newry and Greenore Railway Company operated a cross-border railway in Ireland that closed in 1951.) and for other purposes.
Dartford Tunnel Act 1957 (repealed)	5 & 6 Eliz. 2. c. xxxiv	31 July 1957
An Act to authorise variations of the works authorised by the Dartford Tunnel Acts 1930 (Note: Dartford Tunnel Act 1930 (20 & 21 Geo. 5. c. clxxxii)) and 1937 (Note: Dartford Tunnel Act 1937 (1 Edw. 8 & 1 Geo. 6. c. cxxvii)) including the construction of new works to amend those Acts in certain respects to confer further powers in connection with those works and for other purposes. (Repealed by Dartford Tunnel Act 1967 (c. xxxvii))
London County Council (General Powers) Act 1957	5 & 6 Eliz. 2. c. xxxv	31 July 1957
An Act to confer further powers upon the London County Council and other authorities and for other purposes.
Hastings Tramways Act 1957	5 & 6 Eliz. 2. c. xxxvi	31 July 1957
An Act to transfer the undertaking of the Hastings Tramways Company to the Maidstone and District Motor Services Limited to authorise the discontinuance of the services of trolley vehicles authorised by the Hastings Tramways and Trolley Vehicles Acts 1900 to 1930 and for other purposes.
East Ham Corporation Act 1957	5 & 6 Eliz. 2. c. xxxvii	31 July 1957
An Act to confer further powers upon the mayor aldermen and burgesses of the borough of East Ham and to make further provision for the improvement health local government and finances of the borough and for other purposes.
Esso Petroleum Company Act 1957	5 & 6 Eliz. 2. c. xxxviii	31 July 1957
An Act to authorise the Esso Petroleum Company Limited to construct works and to acquire lands and for other purposes.
Milford Docks Act 1957	5 & 6 Eliz. 2. c. xxxix	31 July 1957
An Act to abandon the docks and other works authorised by the Milford Docks Act 1955 (Note: Milford Docks Act 1955 (4 & 5 Eliz. 2. c. xxiv)) and to empower the Milford Docks Company to construct new works and other works in substitution therefor to extend and redefine the limits of the docks to authorise the raising of additional capital by the Company to confer further powers on the Company and for other purposes.
Finsbury Square Act 1957	5 & 6 Eliz. 2. c. xl	31 July 1957
An Act to authorise the provision of garaging and parking accommodation for vehicles beneath the surface of Finsbury Square in the metropolitan borough of Finsbury to make further provision for the improvement and development of the said square and for other purposes.
Whitstable Harbour Act 1957	5 & 6 Eliz. 2. c. xli	1 August 1957
An Act to provide for the vesting in the urban district council of Whitstable of the harbour at Whitstable and the lands of the British Transport Commission held therewith to confer powers on the Council with reference thereto and the maintenance management and improvement thereof and for other purposes.
Liverpool Corporation Act 1957	5 & 6 Eliz. 2. c. xlii	1 August 1957
An Act to authorise the lord mayor aldermen and citizens of the city of Liverpool to construct additional waterworks and other works connected therewith to acquire lands to make further provision in relation to their water undertaking and for other purposes.

=== Private and personal acts ===
Short title	Citation	Royal assent
Long title
Arundel Estate Act 1957	5 & 6 Eliz. 2. c. 1 Pr.	31 July 1957
An Act for enabling the Arundel Estates settled by an Act of Parliament of the third year of the reign of King Charles the First (Note: Earl of Arundel's Dignity and Estate Act 1627 (3 Cha. 1. c. 4 Pr.)) to be disentailed and for other purposes connected with the said estates.

=== Sources ===
- The Journals of the House of Commons (PDF). Vol. 212 (November 1956 – November 1957). pp. 3–303 – via parliament.uk.
- Chronological Table of the Statutes: Covering the Period from 1235 to the End of 1971. London: Her Majesty's Stationery Office. 1972. pp. 1119–1136. ISBN 978-0-11-840096-1 – via Google Books.
- "UK Public General Acts from 1957". legislation.gov.uk. The National Archives.
- "UK Local Acts from 1957". legislation.gov.uk. The National Archives.
- "UK Private and Personal Acts from 1957". legislation.gov.uk. The National Archives.
- "Chronological Tables of Local Acts: Part 179 (1956-1958)". legislation.gov.uk. The National Archives.
- "Chronological Tables of the Private and Personal Acts: Part 33 (1910-1987)". legislation.gov.uk. The National Archives.

== 6 & 7 Eliz. 2 ==
The third session of the 41st Parliament of the United Kingdom, which met from 5 November 1957 until 23 October 1958.

=== Public general acts ===
Short title	Citation	Royal assent
Long title
National Insurance (No.2) Act 1957 (repealed)	6 & 7 Eliz. 2. c. 1	28 November 1957
An Act to increase contributions and benefits under the National Insurance (Industrial Injuries) Acts, 1946 to 1957, and the National Insurance Acts, 1946 to 1957, to repeal section four of the Finance Act, 1947, (Note: Finance Act 1947 (10 & 11 Geo. 6. c. 35)) to increase pensions under the Old Age Pensions Act, 1936, (Note: Old Age Pensions Act 1936 (26 Geo. 5 & 1 Edw. 8. c. 31)) by an amount equal to the current value of tobacco tokens issued under the said section four and to amend the conditions of entitlement to benefit under the Industrial Diseases (Benefit) Acts, 1951 (Note: Pneumoconiosis and Byssinosis Benefit Act 1951 (15 & 16 Geo. 6 & 1 Eliz. 2. c. 4)) and 1954, (Note: Industrial Diseases (Benefit) Act 1954 (2 & 3 Eliz. 2. c. 16)) payable to or in respect of a person who contracted the disease of byssinosis; and for purposes connected with the matters aforesaid. (Repealed by Statute Law (Repeals) Act 1971 (c. 52))
Expiring Laws Continuance Act 1957 (repealed)	6 & 7 Eliz. 2. c. 2	19 December 1957
An Act to continue certain expiring laws. (Repealed by Statute Law Revision Act 1963 (c. 30))
Yarmouth Naval Hospital Transfer Act 1957 (repealed)	6 & 7 Eliz. 2. c. 3	19 December 1957
An Act to transfer the Royal Naval Hospital at Great Yarmouth to the Minister of Health; and for purposes connected therewith. (Repealed by Mental Health Act 1959 (7 & 8 Eliz. 2. c. 72))
Public Works Loans Act 1957 (repealed)	6 & 7 Eliz. 2. c. 4	19 December 1957
An Act to grant money for the purpose of certain local loans out of the Local Loans Fund, and for other purposes relating to local loans. (Repealed by Public Works Loans Act 1964 (c. 9))

=== Local acts ===
Short title	Citation	Royal assent
Long title
Aberdeen Harbour Order Confirmation Act 1957 (repealed)	6 & 7 Eliz. 2. c. i	28 November 1957
An Act to confirm a Provisional Order under the Private Legislation Procedure (Scotland) Act 1936 (Note: Private Legislation Procedure (Scotland) Act 1936 (26 Geo. 5 & 1 Edw. 8. c. 52)) relating to Aberdeen Harbour. (Repealed by Aberdeen Harbour Order Confirmation Act 1960 (9 & 10 Eliz. 2. c. i))
	Aberdeen Harbour Order 1957 Provision Order to alter the period prescribed by the Aberdeen Harbour Act 1895 within which application is to be made to Parliament for an Act to determine and regulate the administration of Aberdeen Harbour.	
British Transport Commission Order Confirmation Act 1957	6 & 7 Eliz. 2. c. ii	19 December 1957
An Act to confirm a Provisional Order under the Private Legislation Procedure (Scotland) Act 1936 relating to the British Transport Commission.
	British Transport Commission Order 1957 Provision Order to empower the British Transport Commission to construct railways and to acquire lands to confer further powers on the Commission and for other purposes.	
Church of Scotland (General Trustees) Order Confirmation Act 1957	6 & 7 Eliz. 2. c. iii	19 December 1957
An Act to confirm a Provisional Order under the Private Legislation Procedure (Scotland) Act 1936 relating to the Church of Scotland (General Trustees).
	Church of Scotland (General Trustees) Order 1957 Provisional Order to extend the powers of the Church of Scotland General Trustees with respect to the investment of funds held by them and for other purposes.	
Dundee Corporation (Consolidated Powers) Order Confirmation Act 1957	6 & 7 Eliz. 2. c. iv	19 December 1957
An Act to confirm a Provisional Order under the Private Legislation Procedure (Scotland) Act 1936 relating to Dundee Corporation (Consolidated Powers).
	Dundee Corporation (Consolidated Powers) 1957 Provisional Order to consolidate with amendments the Acts and Orders relating to and to confer further powers on the Corporation of the city and royal burgh of Dundee and for other purposes.	
Clyde Lighthouses Order Confirmation Act 1957 (repealed)	6 & 7 Eliz. 2. c. v	19 December 1957
An Act to confirm a Provisional Order under the Private Legislation Procedure (Scotland) Act 1936 relating to Clyde Lighthouses. (Repealed by Statute Law (Repeals) Act 1986 (c. 12))
	Clyde Lighthouses Order 1957 Provisional Order to authorise the Trustees of the Clyde Lighthouses to borrow money for the purposes of their undertaking and for other purposes.	

=== Sources ===
- The Journals of the House of Commons (PDF). Vol. 213 (November 1957 – October 1958). pp. 3–313 – via parliament.uk.
- Chronological Table of the Statutes: Covering the Period from 1235 to the End of 1971. London: Her Majesty's Stationery Office. 1972. p. 1136. ISBN 978-0-11-840096-1 – via Google Books.
- "UK Public General Acts from 1957". legislation.gov.uk. The National Archives.
- "UK Local Acts from 1957". legislation.gov.uk. The National Archives.
- "Chronological Tables of Local Acts: Part 179 (1956-1958)". legislation.gov.uk. The National Archives.

== See also ==
- List of acts of the Parliament of the United Kingdom
