= Film Levy Finance Act 1981 =

Act of the Parliament of the United Kingdom

Film Levy Finance Act 1981 (Note: Section 11(1).)
- Act of Parliament
- Parliament of the United Kingdom
- Long title: An Act to consolidate the Cinematograph Films Acts 1957 to 1980.
- Citation: 1981 c. 16
- Territorial extent: England and Wales; Scotland; (Note: Section 11(3).)

Dates
- Royal assent: 15 April 1981
- Commencement: 15 May 1981 (Note: Section 11(2).)
- Repealed: 5 November 1993

Other legislation
- Amends: See § Repealed enactments
- Repeals/revokes: See § Repealed enactments
- Repealed by: Statute Law (Repeals) Act 1993
- Relates to: National Film Finance Corporation Act 1981

Status: Repealed

Text of statute as originally enacted

Revised text of statute as amended

The Film Levy Finance Act 1981 (c. 16) was an act of the Parliament of the United Kingdom that consolidated enactments related to film levy finance in Great Britain.

== Provisions ==
=== Repealed enactments ===
Section 10(2) of the act repealed 8 enactments, listed in schedule 2 to the act.

Enactments repealed by section 10(2)
Citation	Short title	Extent of repeal
5 & 6 Eliz. 2. c. 21	Cinematograph Films Act 1957	The whole act.
6 & 7 Eliz. 2. c. 51	Public Records Act 1958	In Schedule 2, the entry relating to section 5 of the Cinematograph Films Act 1957.
8 & 9 Eliz. 2. c. 57	Films Act 1960	Section 51(5).
1966 c. 48	Films Act 1966	Section 7(3) and (6).
1970 c. 26	Films Act 1970	Sections 5 to 8.
1970 c. 26	Films Act 1970	Section 21.
1970 c. 26	Films Act 1970	Section 22(1)(b).
1972 c. 11	Superannuation Act 1972	In Schedule 4, the entry relating to the Agency.
1979 c. 2	Customs and Excise Management Act 1979	In Schedule 4, in Part I of the Table at the end of paragraph 12, the entry relating to the Cinematograph Films Act 1957.
1980 c. 41	Films Act 1980	Sections 2 and 4.
1980 c. 41	Films Act 1980	Section 9(1)(b).

== Subsequent developments ==
The whole act was repealed by section 1(1) of, and group 3 of part IX of schedule 1 to, the Statute Law (Repeals) Act 1993, which came into force on 5 November 1993.
