= Films Act 1960 =

Act of the Parliament of the United Kingdom

Films Act 1960 (Note: Section 52(1).)
- Act of Parliament
- Parliament of the United Kingdom
- Long title: An Act to consolidate the Cinematograph Films Acts, 1938 to 1960.
- Citation: 8 & 9 Eliz. 2. c. 57
- Territorial extent: England and Wales; Scotland; (Note: Section 52(4).)

Dates
- Royal assent: 29 July 1960
- Commencement: 1 January 1961 (Note: Section 52(2).)
- Repealed: 23 May 1985
Other legislation
Repeals/revokes	See § Repealed enactments
Amended by	Singapore Act 1966; Statute Law (Repeals) Act 1977; Films Act 1980; Film Levy Finance Act 1981
Repealed by	Films Act 1985

Status: Repealed

Text of statute as originally enacted

The Films Act 1960 (8 & 9 Eliz. 2. c. 57) was an act of the Parliament of the United Kingdom that consolidated enactments relating to the regulation of the British film industry in England and Wales and Scotland.

== Provisions ==
=== Repealed enactments ===
Section 51(1) of the act repealed 3 enactments, listed in that section.

Citation	Short title	Extent of repeal
1 & 2 Geo. 6. c. 17	Cinematograph Films Act 1938	The whole act.
11 & 12 Geo. 6. c. 23	Cinematograph Films Act 1948	The whole act.
8 & 9 Eliz. 2. c. 14	Cinematograph Films Act 1960	The whole act.

== Subsequent developments ==
The whole act was repealed by section 7(1) of, and schedule 2 to, the Films Act 1985, which came into force on 23 May 1985.
