= Films Act 1980 =

Act of the Parliament of the United Kingdom

Films Act 1980 (Note: Section 9(1).)
- Act of Parliament
- Parliament of the United Kingdom
- Long title: An Act to amend the enactments relating to the financing and exhibition of films.
- Citation: 1980 c. 41
- Territorial extent: England and Wales; Scotland; (Note: Section 9(4).)

Dates
- Royal assent: 17 July 1980
- Commencement: 20 July 1980 (except section 8); 23 July 1982 (section 8); (Note: Section 9(2). The Films Act 1980 (Commencement) Order 1982 (SI 1982/1020).)
- Repealed: 23 May 1985
Other legislation
Amends	Cinematograph Film Production (Special Loans) Act 1949; Cinematograph Film Fum Production (Special Loans) Act 1954; Cinematograph Films Act 1957; Films Act 1960; Films Act 1966; National Loans Act 1968; Films Act 1970
Repeals/revokes	Cinematograph Film Production (Special Loans) Act 1952; Cinematograph Films Act 1975
Amended by	National Film Finance Corporation Act 1981; Film Levy Finance Act 1981
Repealed by	Films Act 1985

Status: Repealed

Text of statute as originally enacted

The Films Act 1980 (c. 41) was an act of the Parliament of the United Kingdom. The act allowed the National Film Finance Corporation to exercise its powers in relation to financing the production of films for an extended period, gave further funding to the Corporation and amended the laws around the quotas of British films.

== Provisions ==
The provisions of the act include:

=== Section 1 ===
- Extending the functions of the National Film Finance Corporation to the end of 1985 by amending the Films Act 1970 (c. 26), the Cinematograph Film Production (Special Loans) Act 1949 (12, 13 & 14 Geo. 6. c. 20) and the Cinematograph Films Act 1957 (5 & 6 Eliz. 2. c. 21) (which allowed the corporation to make loans to film makers up to the end of 1980).

=== Section 2 ===
- Revoking Section 4 of the Cinematograph Film Production (Special Loans) Act 1949 which authorised government lending to the Corporation up until the end of 1980.
- Making provisions for a £1 million government grant to be made available to the Corporation.
- Limiting the Corporation's government borrowing to no more than £5 million.
- Making it the duty of the British Film Fund Agency to collect the 'Eady Levy'.

=== Section 3 ===
- Amending Section 1(2) of the Cinematograph Film Production (Special Loans) Act 1949 to increase the number of directors from five to six.

=== Section 4 ===
- Amending Section 2 of the Cinematograph Films Act 1957 in respect of levies on exhibitors.

=== Section 5 ===
- Amending section 1 of the Films Act 1960 (8 & 9 Eliz. 2. c. 57), extending the obligation of exhibitors to meet a quota of British or Community films among those that are shown to the end of 1985.

=== Section 6 ===
- Amending section 3 of the Films Act 1960 to change the quota requirements.

=== Section 7 ===
- Giving the Secretary of State the powers to suspend quota requirements.

=== Section 8 ===
- Amending section 17 of the Films Act 1960 to change the requirements needed to qualify as a British film.

=== Schedule ===
- Repealing of whole of the Cinematograph Film Production (Special Loans) Act 1952 and the Cinematograph Films Act 1975.

== Subsequent developments ==
The whole act was repealed by section 7(1) of, and schedule 2 to, the Films Act 1985, which came into force on 23 May 1985.
