= Cheshire Brine Subsidence Compensation Board =

UK Government compensatory body

Cheshire Brine Pumping (Compensation for Subsidence) Act 1952
- Act of Parliament
- Parliament of the United Kingdom
- Long title: An Act to form a brine subsidence compensation district and establish a compensation board for that district in the administrative county of the county palatine of Chester to dissolve the Northwich Salt Compensation Board and for other purposes.
- Citation: 15 & 16 Geo. 6 & 1 Eliz. 2. c. xlii

Dates
- Royal assent: 1 August 1952

Status: Current legislation

Text of statute as originally enacted

The Cheshire Brine Subsidence Compensation Board was created by the Cheshire Brine Pumping (Compensation for Subsidence) Act 1952 (15 & 16 Geo. 6 & 1 Eliz. 2. c. xlii).

It pays compensation caused by any subsidence damage in Cheshire attributable to the practice of brine pumping.

== See also ==
- Salt in Cheshire
