= Cinematograph Films Act 1927 =

Act of the Parliament of the United Kingdom regarding the British film industry

Cinematograph Films Act 1927 (Note: Section 33(1).)
- Act of Parliament
- Parliament of the United Kingdom
- Long title: An Act to restrict blind booking and advance booking of cinematograph films, and to secure the renting and exhibition of a certain proportion of British films, and for purposes connected therewith.
- Citation: 17 & 18 Geo. 5. c. 29
- Territorial extent: England and Wales; Scotland; (Note: Section 33(2).)

Dates
- Royal assent: 22 December 1927
- Commencement: 1 January 1928 (Note: Section 33(3).)
- Expired: 1 September 1938 (parts I and II) (Note: Section 33(4).)
- Repealed: 1 April 1938
Other legislation
Amended by	Cinematograph Films Act 1938
Repealed by	Cinematograph Films Act 1948

Status: Repealed

Text of statute as originally enacted

The Cinematograph Films Act 1927 (17 & 18 Geo. 5. c. 29) was an act of the Parliament of the United Kingdom designed to stimulate the declining British film industry. It received royal assent on 22 December 1927 and came into force on 1 April 1928.

== Description ==
The act introduced a requirement for British cinemas to show a quota of British films for a duration of 10 years. Its supporters believed that it would promote the emergence of a vertically integrated film industry, with production, distribution and exhibition infrastructure controlled by the same companies. As the vertically integrated American film industry had rapid growth in the years immediately following the end of World War I, the intention was to counter Hollywood's perceived economic and cultural dominance by promoting similar business practices among British studios, distributors and cinema chains.

By creating an obligatory market-section for British films, it was hoped that the increased economic activity in the production sector would lead to the growth of a self-sustaining industry. The quota was initially set at 7.5% for exhibitors but was raised to 20% in 1935. The films included those shot in British dominions such as Canada and Australia.

A British film was defined according to the following criteria:

- The film must be made by a British or British-controlled company.
- Studio scenes must be photographed within a film studio in the British Empire.
- The author of the scenario or the original work on which the screenplay was based must be a British subject.
- At least 75% of the salaries must be paid to British subjects, excluding the costs of two persons, at least one of whom must be an actor. (That provision allowed for a British film to include a highly paid non-British star, producer, or director but still be regarded as a British film.)

Hollywood studios had to comply with the quota if they wanted their productions shown in Britain. Rather than forfeiting the lucrative British market, the studios contracted with British producers to make low-budget features for them, so their American productions could be distributed alongside them in Britain. These cheap, homegrown features became known as quota quickies.

== Consequences ==
The act is generally considered unsuccessful. It fostered speculative investment in lavishly budgeted features for which production costs could not have been recouped on the domestic market, and it was criticised for the emergence of the inferior "quota quickies".

Cinematograph Films Act 1938 (Note: Section 46(1).)
- Act of Parliament
- Parliament of the United Kingdom
- Long title: An Act to make further provision for securing the renting and exhibition of a certain proportion of British cinematograph films, and for restricting blind booking and advance booking of cinematograph films; to make provision as to the wages and conditions of employment of persons employed by makers of cinematograph films; and to provide for purposes connected with the matters aforesaid.
- Citation: 1 & 2 Geo. 6. c. 17
- Territorial extent: England and Wales; Scotland; (Note: Section 46(3).)

Dates
- Royal assent: 30 March 1938
- Commencement: 1 April 1938 (Note: Section 46(2).)
- Repealed: 1 January 1961
Other legislation
Amends	Cinematograph Films Act 1927
Repealed by	Films Act 1960

Status: Repealed

Text of statute as originally enacted

The act was modified by the Cinematograph Films Act 1938 (1 & 2 Geo. 6. c. 17), which removed films shot in British Empire countries from the quota. It was, in turn, amended by further acts, and it was eventually repealed by the Films Act 1960 (8 & 9 Eliz. 2. c. 57).

In recent years, an alternative view has arisen among film historians, such as Lawrence Napper, who have argued that the quota quickie has been too casually dismissed, and is of particular cultural and historical value because such films often contained performances unique to British popular culture, such as music hall and variety acts, that would not have been filmed under normal circumstances.

== See also ==
- Category:Quota quickies, a list of films produced to fulfill this quota
- Canadian content
- B movie

== 'Bibliography ==
- Nobody Ordered Wolves, Jeffrey Dell, London & Toronto, William Heinemann, 1939.
- 'State Protection of a Beleaguered Industry', Michael Chanan, British Cinema History, James Curran & Vincent Porter (eds.), London, Weidenfeld & Nicolson, 1983, pp. 59–73.
- The Age of the Dream Palace: Cinema and Society in Britain, 1930–39, Jeffrey Richards, London, Routledge, 1984.
- Cinema and State: The Film Industry and the Government, 1927–1984, Margaret Dickinson and Sarah Street, London, British Film Institute, 1985.
- Dissolving Views: Key Writings on British Cinema, Andrew Higson (ed.), London, Cassell, 1996.
- 'The British Film Industry's Production Sector Difficulties in the Late 1930s', John Sedgwick, Historical Journal of Film, Radio and Television, vol. 17, no. 1 (1997), pp. 49–66.
- The Unknown 1930s: An Alternative History of the British Cinema 1929–1939, Jeffrey Richards, Manchester, I.B. Tauris, 2001.
- 'A Despicable Tradition? Quota Quickies in the 1930s', Lawrence Napper, The British Cinema Book (2nd and 3rd editions), Robert Murphy (ed.), London, BFI Publishing, 2001, pp. 37–47.
- Steve Chibnall, Quota Quickies: The Birth of the British ‘B’ Film (London: British Film Institute, 2007) [reviewed ]
- The British 'B' Film, Steve Chibnall and Brian McFarlane, London, Bloomsbury, 2019.
