= National Film Finance Corporation Act 1981 =

Act of the Parliament of the United Kingdom

National Film Finance Corporation Act 1981 (Note: Section 10(1).)
- Act of Parliament
- Parliament of the United Kingdom
- Long title: An Act to consolidate the Cinematograph Film Production (Special Loans) Acts 1949 to 1980 and to repeal, as spent, certain enactments relating to the National Film Finance Corporation.
- Citation: 1981 c. 15
- Territorial extent: England and Wales; Scotland; (Note: Section 10(4).)

Dates
- Royal assent: 15 April 1981
- Commencement: 15 May 1981 (Note: Section 10(3).)
- Repealed: 5 November 1993

Other legislation
- Amends: See § Repealed enactments
- Repeals/revokes: See § Repealed enactments
- Repealed by: Statute Law (Repeals) Act 1993
- Relates to: Film Levy Finance Act 1981

Status: Repealed

Text of statute as originally enacted

Revised text of statute as amended

The National Film Finance Corporation Act 1981 (c. 15) was an act of the Parliament of the United Kingdom that consolidated enactments relating to special loans for cinematograph film production in England and Wales and Scotland.

== Provisions ==
=== Repealed enactments ===
Section 10(2) of the act repealed 12 enactments, listed in parts I and II of schedule 3 to the act.

Part I — Consequential Repeals
Citation	Short title	Extent of repeal
12, 13 & 14 Geo. 6. c. 20	Cinematograph Film Production (Special Loans) Act 1949	The whole act.
2 & 3 Eliz. 2. c. 15	Cinematograph Film Production (Special Loans) Act 1954	The whole act.
5 & 6 Eliz. 2. c. 21	Cinematograph Films Act 1957	Sections 11 to 13. Section 17(2).
1966 c. 48	Films Act 1966	Sections 2 and 7(2).
1970 c. 26	Films Act 1970	Sections 1 and 3. Section 21 so far as it amends the Cinematograph Film Production (Special Loans) Act 1949. Section 22(1)(a).
1972 c. 11	Superannuation Act 1972	Section 22(5). In Schedule 4, the entry relating to the Corporation.
1980 c. 41	Films Act 1980	Section 1. Section 2(1) to (4). Section 3. Section 9(1)(a).

Part II — Repeal of Spent Enactments
Citation	Short title	Extent of repeal
Enactment spent in relation to whole of United Kingdom
1968 c. 13	National Loans Act 1968	Section 10(6).
Enactments spent in relation to Northern Ireland
12, 13 & 14 Geo. 6. c. 20	Cinematograph Film Production (Special Loans) Act 1949	The whole act.
14 Geo. 6. c. 18	Cinematograph Film Production (Special Loans) Act 1950	The whole act.
15 & 16 Geo. 6 & 1 Eliz. 2. c. 20	Cinematograph Film Production (Special Loans) Act 1952	The whole act.
2 & 3 Eliz. 2. c. 15	Cinematograph Film Production (Special Loans) Act 1954	The whole act.

== Subsequent developments ==
The whole act was repealed by section 1(1) of, and group 3 of part IX of schedule 1 to, the Statute Law (Repeals) Act 1993, which came into force on 5 November 1993.
