= Advertisements (Hire-Purchase) Act 1967 =

Act of the Parliament of the United Kingdom

Advertisements (Hire-Purchase) Act 1967 (Note: Section 8(1).)
- Act of Parliament
- Parliament of the United Kingdom
- Long title: An Act to consolidate the enactments relating to the contents of advertisements displayed or issued in connection with hire-purchase or credit-sale.
- Citation: 1967 c. 42
- Territorial extent: England and Wales; Scotland; (Note: Section 8(5).)

Dates
- Royal assent: 14 July 1967
- Commencement: 14 August 1967 (Note: Section 8(4).)
- Repealed: 19 May 1985 (Note: The Consumer Credit Act 1974 (Commencement No. 8) Order 1983 (SI 1983/1551).)
Other legislation
| Amends | See § Repealed enactments |
| Repeals/revokes | See § Repealed enactments |
| Repealed by | Consumer Credit Act 1974 |

Status: Repealed

Text of statute as originally enacted

The Advertisements (Hire-Purchase) Act 1967 (c. 42) was an act of the Parliament of the United Kingdom that consolidated enactments relating to the contents of advertisements displayed or issued in connection with hire-purchase or credit-sale in Great Britain.

== Provisions ==
=== Repealed enactments ===
Section 8(2) of the act repealed 3 enactments, listed in schedule 2 to the act.

| Citation | Short title | Extent of repeal |
|---|---|---|
| 5 & 6 Eliz. 2. c. 41 | Advertisements (Hire-Purchase) Act 1957 | The whole act. |
| 1964 c. 53 | Hire Purchase Act 1964 | Part IV. |
| 1965 c. 67 | Hire-Purchase (Scotland) Act 1965 | Schedule 3. In Schedule 4, the entry relating to the Advertisements (Hire-Purchase) Act 1957. In Schedule 5, the entry relating to the Advertisements (Hire-Purchase) Act 1957. |

== Subsequent developments ==
The whole act was repealed by section 192(3)(b) of, and part I of schedule 5 to, the Consumer Credit Act 1974, which came into force on 19 May 1985.
