= Scottish Amicable Life Assurance =

1823–1997 mutual life assurance institution in the UK

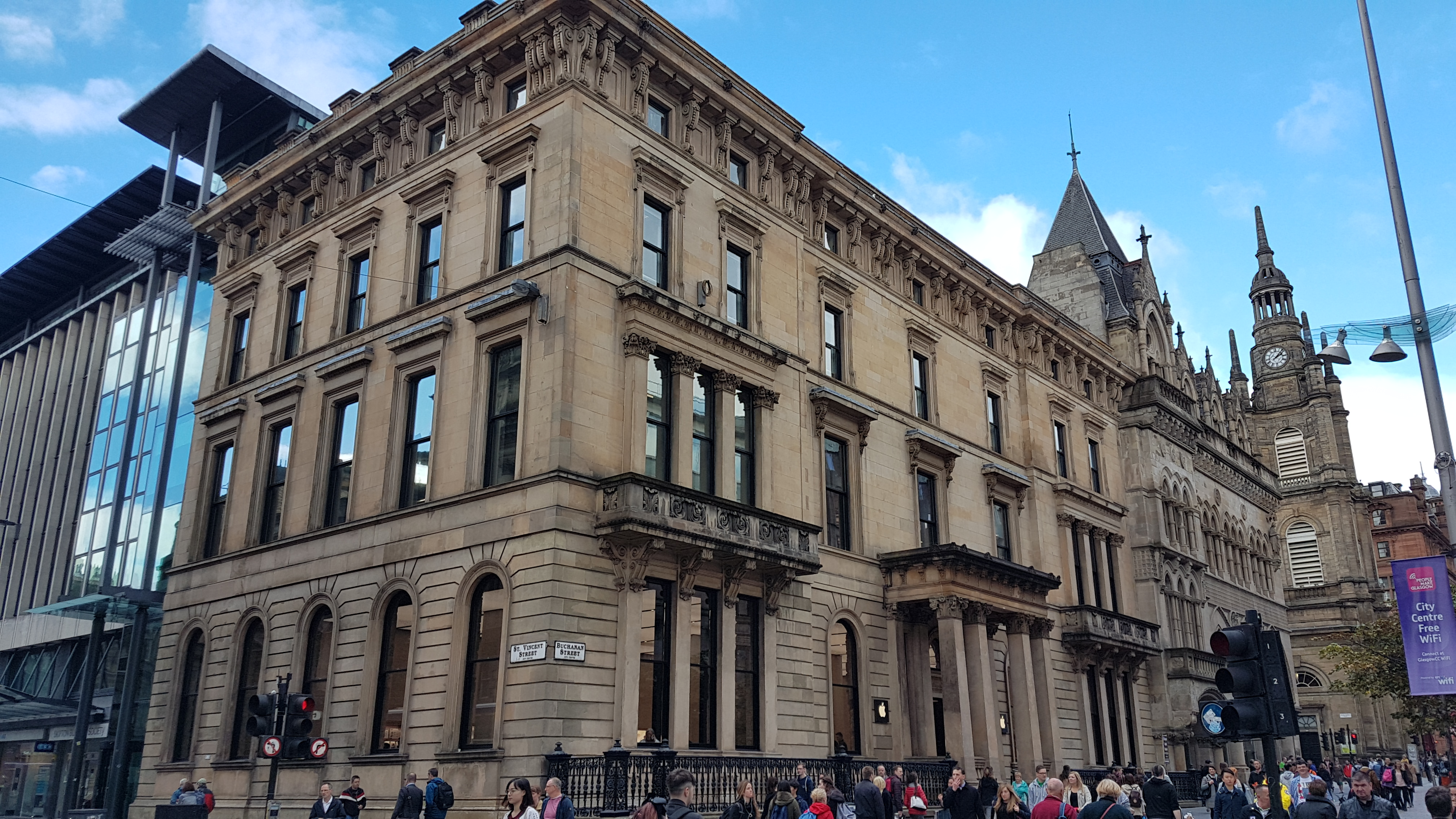
- The original head office at 147 Buchanan Street, Glasgow
- Type: Mutual company
- Industry: Mutual life assurance
- Founded: 1823; 203 years ago
- Defunct: 1997
- Fate: Acquired by Prudential Assurance
- Headquarters: Craigforth House, near Stirling, Scotland, United Kingdom
- Area served: United Kingdom; Australia
- Key people: Sandy Stewart (Chairman); Roy Nicholson, Managing Director; Paul Bradshaw, Deputy Managing Director
- Products: Life insurance policies
- Revenue: £3,106.5 million (1997)
- Net income: £1,125.9 (1997)
- AUM: £15 billion (1997)
- Number of employees: 2,200 (1995)

The Scottish Amicable Life Assurance Society, commonly known as Scottish Amicable, was a Scottish mutual life insurance company based in Glasgow. It was founded in 1826 and became the sixth largest mutual life assurance institution in the UK with 1.9 million policy holders in the mid-1990s before being acquired.

After Scottish Amicable announced a plan to demutualise the company in early 1997, a bidding war, which also involved Abbey National and AMP Limited, took place. Scottish Amicable was acquired by Prudential Assurance, in a deal worth £2.8 billion (US $4.5 billion) (US $9 billion at current prices) two months later. It was regarded as a major transaction at the time and the Wall Street Journal said, that with this deal, "Mergermania Has Hit European Companies".

== History ==
In 1823, James Duncan, a Glasgow accountant, founded the West of Scotland Fire Insurance Company. The initial capital was raised from Duncan's friends and local merchants. At the first annual general meeting Duncan proposed the formation of a life office to operate in tandem with the fire company. The life company, West of Scotland Life Insurance, was founded in 1826. with Duncan manager of both companies. In 1832, the life company decided to mutualise, modelling itself on The Equitable Life Assurance Society, adopting the new name of the Scottish Amicable Life Assurance Society and becoming incorporated in 1849. James Duncan resigned in 1839 through ill health, The new manager was William Spens, an accountant with Edinburgh Life; the Spens family connection continued for over a century.

Spens pursued an expansionary policy. There was already a branch in Edinburgh and between 1841 and 1852 branches were opened in the three capital cities of Belfast, London and Dublin. The London branch became increasingly important, directly serving many important English cities. In the meantime, West of Scotland Fire was experiencing financial difficulties and was sold to Phoenix Fire in 1842. There was a modest branch expansion around the turn of the century with Birmingham, Newcastle and Bristol. By 1930, the Society was operating out of 14 branches, and by the Second World War, Scottish Amicable was operating out of 16 branches and numerous satellite offices.

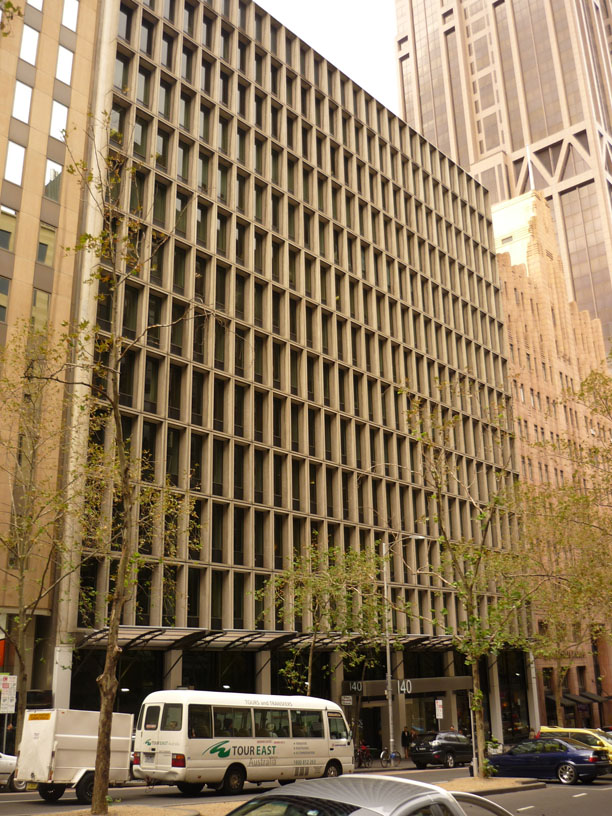
The Scottish Amicable Life Assurance Building in Queen Street, Melbourne

By the early 20th century, the Society was comfortably within the top ten Scottish life companies. One of the innovations which was to prove of great significance to Scottish Amicable had its beginnings just before the Second World War when a Group life and pensions department was started in London. This was expanded rapidly after the War and by 1951 pensions income was almost equal to traditional life insurance; by 1968 it was around 60%. Another major departure for Scottish Amicable was the decision in 1959 to investigate the possibility of opening in Australia. A Melbourne office was opened in 1960 and by 1965 income was treble expectations. A year later, the directors reported that there were five Australian branches. Back home, an active branch expansion programme continued with almost fifty branches opened between 1947 and 1975. By the mid-1990s, Scottish Amicable was the sixth largest mutual life company in the UK.

The company closed its head office at St Vincent Street in Glasgow and consolidated its operations at Craigforth, near Stirling, in 1996.

In January 1997, Scottish Amicable announced a plan to demutualise with the intention of listing on the London Stock Exchange within a further three to six years. The plan involved flotation of the company, backed by Swiss Re, a remuneration scheme for the executive team under which they would receive shares worth up to £14.4 million depending on performance, and an initial pay-out for life assurance policy holders worth £75 million. However, the scheme was seen in the financial media as being far too generous to the executive team.

This precipitated a bidding war for the Society. At the end of January, it received a bid from Abbey National worth up to £1.4 billion. Scottish Amicable rejected the bid from Abbey National on the basis that it was "too vague". There were also concerns about potential job losses among the staff at Craigforth. A week later Prudential Assurance offered £1.96 billion.

After AMP Limited also lodged a formal bid, which was rejected, Prudential Assurance succeeded with an offer of £2.8 billion. The Wall Street Journal said, that with this deal, "Mergermania Has Hit European Companies". The deal involved Prudential Assurance injecting £531 million into Scottish Amicable so that it could make a payment of £562 million to policyholders. The New York Times explained that the UK Government was encouraging the British people to reduce their dependence on social security payments in retirement, and instead was encouraging people to take out life assurance policies. The newspaper said, in the context of the UK Government policy, the deal meant that "consolidation of the British life insurance industry [was] accelerating".

At an Extraordinary General Meeting on 26 June 1997, members approved the transfer of the business to Prudential Assurance with effect from 30 September 1997. No new business was written after that date and Scottish Amicable ceased trading. The Scottish Amicable brand was formally dropped by Prudential Assurance in November 2001. The Scottish Amicable Insurance Fund policies were formally merged into the Prudential With-Profits Sub Fund in April 2021 after it was predicted that the assets would fall below a specified level, specifically £1 billion, in 2024.

== Head office ==
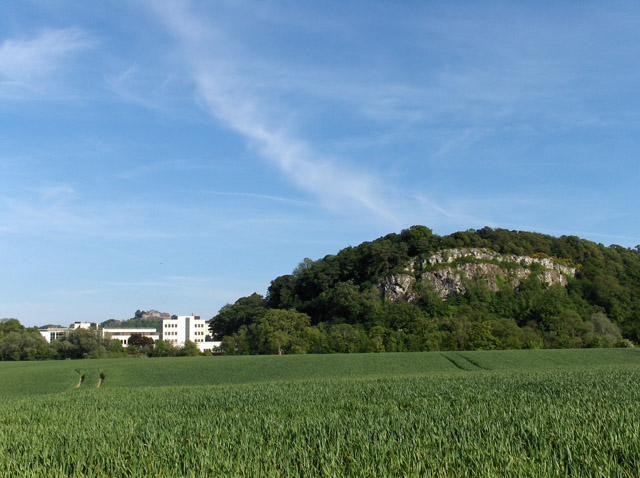
The modern office complex built for Scottish Amicable (on the left) and the Craigforth Crag (on the right)

Scottish Amicable commissioned its own offices at 147 Buchanan Street in Glasgow and moved into the building in 1829. After the company moved to larger premises at 35 St Vincent Street in Glasgow in 1859, the Buchanan Street building was refurbished and later became the Western Club. It survives and remains a Category A listed building.

The company acquired Craigforth House and its extensive estate near Stirling in 1952, and subsequently erected a modern office complex at the north end of the estate, which is dominated by the Craigforth Crag. A newly built head office building at 150 St Vincent Street in Glasgow was completed in 1976. However, the company decided to consolidate its operations at Craigforth, as a cost saving measure, in 1996.

After Scottish Amicable was acquired by Prudential Assurance in 1997, the buildings at Craigforth were used by Prudential and then by Prudential's successor company M&G plc until 2022 when the last staff moved out. In February 2023 concerns were raised about the poor condition of the buildings. The modern office complex had been damaged by vandalism and local people were concerned that without proper security measures the vandalism might spread to the main house which, in its original form, dated to the 17th century.

== Operations ==
The company was a major provider of life assurance policies in the United Kingdom and Australia: it had 1.9 million policy holders in 1995. It also had an investment management arm, known as Scottish Amicable Investment Managers, with some £15 billion of funds under management in 1997.

== Sponsorship ==
The company was a significant sponsor of the arts: it sponsored a production of the opera, Turandot, by Giacomo Puccini at the Theatre Royal in Glasgow in April 1984. It also sponsored a visit to Glasgow by the Russian chess grandmaster, Anatoly Karpov, organised by Chess Scotland, in May 1984, and provided £300,000 to the British Baseball Federation, allowing it to form the Scottish Amicable National League in 1986. It went on to sponsor a prize, the Scottish Amicable Award, at the Royal Glasgow Institute of the Fine Arts in the 1990s.

== Legal action ==
In October 1907, Allgemeine Deutsche Credit Anstalt v Scottish Amicable was an important legal case in which some bankers raised an action against Scottish Amicable arguing that their client, following a series of assignments, should benefit from the policy. The judge rejected their case.
