= Advertisements (Hire-Purchase) Act 1957 =

Act of the Parliament of the United Kingdom

Advertisements (Hire-Purchase) Act 1957 (Note: Section 5(1).)
- Act of Parliament
- Parliament of the United Kingdom
- Long title: An Act to make provision as to the information to be included in advertisements displayed or issued in connection with hire-purchase or credit sale; and for purposes connected with the matter aforesaid.
- Citation: 5 & 6 Eliz. 2. c. 41
- Territorial extent: England and WalesScotland; (Note: Section 5(3).)

Dates
- Royal assent: 17 July 1957
- Commencement: 1 January 1958 (Note: Section 5(2).)
- Repealed: 14 August 1967 (Note: Section 5(2).)
Other legislation
Amended by	Hire-Purchase Act 1964
Repealed by	Advertisements (Hire-Purchase) Act 1967

Status: Repealed

Text of statute as originally enacted

The Advertisements (Hire-Purchase) Act 1957 (5 & 6 Eliz. 2. c. 41) was an act of the Parliament of the United Kingdom that regulated the way in which hire-purchase agreements could be advertised. One of the objectives of the Hire-Purchase Act 1938 had been to make sure that people entering into a hire-purchase agreement must be signed by the parties and must contain minimal financial information. This did not help, however, in situations where a party may have been misled by advertisements, and putting something in a document is not the same as ensuring somebody has read it before they signed it.

To partially remedy this, a private member's bill was put forward and sponsored by the Board of Trade with the aim of restricting the way hire-purchase agreements could be advertised. The act came into force on 1 January 1958. The act was aimed at "incomplete" and misleading advertisements, and covered "every form of visual advertising" such as posters, cinema advertisements and newspapers. It excludes "any form of advertising consisting only of spoken words, with or without other sounds", and thus radio broadcasts were not covered by the act. If the advertisement fell within the definition given by the act, certain information must be displayed "in such a way as to not give undue prominence to any part of it in comparison with any other part". This information is the deposit (either a statement that there is no deposit or a deposit expressed as a sum of money or a percentage or fraction of the total price), the installments (the total number, the amount of each as expressed by a sum of money and the gap between each instalment) and a sum that is the overall cash price of the goods.

Non-compliance with the act led to a fine of £50 for a first offence and £100 for subsequent offences; this was criticized as an "obvious weakness of the act", since such a sum is unlikely to deter large companies. The act does not invalidate agreements made with false advertising, so even if a company does violate the act, any contracts would still be valid.

== Subsequent developments ==
The whole act was repealed by section 8(2) of, and schedule 2 to, the Advertisements (Hire-Purchase) Act 1967, which came into force on 14 August 1967.

== Bibliography ==
- Diamond, Aubrey (1958). "Advertisements (Hire-Purchase) Act 1957". Modern Law Review. 21 (2). Blackwell Publishing. ISSN 0026-7961.
