= Coinage Offences Act =

Stock short title used in legislation

Coinage Offences Act (with its variations) is a stock short title used for legislation in New Zealand and the United Kingdom which relates to coinage offences.

The bill for an act with this short title may have been known as a Coinage Offences Bill during its passage through Parliament.

== List ==
=== New Zealand ===
The Coinage Offences Act 1867

=== United Kingdom ===
The Coinage Offences Act 1832 (2 & 3 Will. 4. c. 34)
The Coinage (Colonial Offences) Act 1853 (16 & 17 Vict. c. 48) (An Act for the Punishment of Offences in the Colonies in relation to the Coin) (The citation of this Act by this short title was authorised by the Short Titles Act 1896) (repealed by Part XIV of Schedule 1 to the Statute Law (Repeals) Act 1976)
The Coinage Offences Act 1861 (24 & 25 Vict. c. 99) (repealed by the Coinage Offences Act 1936, section 18(2) and Schedule)
The Counterfeit Currency (Convention) Act 1935 (25 & 26 Geo. 5. c. 25)
The Coinage Offences Act 1936 (26 Geo. 5 & 1 Edw. 8. c. 16)

The Coinage Offences Acts

The Coinage Offences Acts 1861 and 1935 was the collective title of the Coinage Offences Act 1861 and the provisions of the Counterfeit Currency (Convention) Act 1935 which amended that act.

== See also ==
List of short titles
