= List of acts of the Parliament of Victoria from 1933 =

This is a list of acts of the Parliament of Victoria, Australia for the year 1933.

== 1933 ==
Short title, or popular name	Citation	Royal assent
Long title
	No. 4107	5 January 1933
An Act to apply a sum out of the Consolidated Revenue to the service of the year ending on the thirtieth day of June One thousand nine hundred and thirty-three and to appropriate the Supplies granted in this Session of Parliament.
	No. 4108	29 June 1933
An Act to apply out of the Consolidated Revenue the sum of Two million two hundred and four thousand seven hundred and ninety pounds to the service of the year One thousand nine hundred and thirty-three and One thousand nine hundred and thirty-four.
	No. 4111	31 July 1933
An Act to apply out of the Consolidated Revenue the sum of One million and seventy-four thousand nine hundred and eighty-four pounds to the service of the year One thousand nine hundred and thirty-two and One thousand nine hundred and thirty-three.
University Act 1933	No. 4116	14 August 1933
An Act to amend the University Acts.
Wangaratta Lands Act 1933 (repealed)	No. 4121	28 August 1933
An Act to authorize the Mayor Councillors and Burgesses of the Borough of Wangaratta to grant a Lease of a Portion of the Wangaratta Town Hall Site to the Country Fire Brigades Board for Purposes of the Fire Brigades Act 1928. (Note: Fire Brigades Act 1928 (19 Geo. V. No. 3682)) (Repealed by Land (Miscellaneous Matters) Act 1989 (No. 34 of 1989))
	No. 4123	30 August 1933
An Act to apply out of the Consolidated Revenue the sum of One million and thirty-six thousand seven hundred pounds to the service of the year One thousand nine hundred and thirty-three and One thousand nine hundred and thirty-four.
Albert Park Land Act 1933 (repealed)	No. 4127	25 September 1933
An Act to provide for the Revocation of the Permanent Reservation of a Portion of certain Land situate in the Municipal Districts of the City of South Melbourne and the City of St. Kilda reserved as a Site for a Public Park and for the Permanent Reservation of the said Portion of the said Land for the Purposes of the Education Acts. (Repealed by Statute Law Revision Act 1984 (No. 10087))
Centenary Celebrations Council Act 1933 (repealed)	No. 4128	25 September 1933
An Act to make Provision with respect to the Celebration of the Centenary of the Settlement of Victoria and of the Founding of Melbourne. (Repealed by Statute Law Revision Act 1995 (No. 11 of 1995))
Unemployment Relief (Administration) Act 1933 (repealed)	No. 4135	5 October 1933
An Act to make Provision with respect to certain Payments out of the Unemployment Relief Fund. (Repealed by Treasury Legislation (Repeal) Act 2005 (No. 73 of 2005))
	No. 4137	5 October 1933
An Act to apply out of the Consolidated Revenue the sum of One million and twenty-nine thousand seven hundred and sixty-three pounds to the service of the year One thousand nine hundred and thirty-three and One thousand nine hundred and thirty-four.
	No. 4138	1 November 1933
An Act to apply out of the Consolidated Revenue the sum of One million and fifteen thousand lour hundred and thirty-seven pounds to the service of the year One thousand nine hundred and thirty-three and One thousand nine hundred and thirty-four.
Melbourne General Cemetery Land Act 1933 (repealed)	No. 4139	6 November 1933
An Act to remove Doubts as to the Title of the Trustees of the Melbourne General Cemetery to certain Land in the City of Melbourne at Carlton, and for other purposes. (Repealed by Statute Law Revision Act 1984 (No. 10087))
Administration and Probate Act 1933	No. 4141	21 November 1933
An Act relating to the Estates of Persons who are presumed by the Supreme Court to be dead and of certain other Persons, and for other purposes.
British Migrants (Agreement) Act 1933	No. 4143	27 November 1933
An Act to approve an Agreement between the Commonwealth of Australia of the one part and the State of Victoria of the other part relating to a Scheme for adjusting the Grievances of certain Migrants settled upon the Land in Victoria in pursuance of an Act of the Parliament of the United Kingdom of Great Britain and Ireland known as the Empire Settlement Act 1922. (Note: Empire Settlement Act 1922 (12 & 13 Geo. 5. c. 13 (Imp)))
Auction Sales Act 1933	No. 4144	27 November 1933
An Act to amend Sections Three and Four of the Auction Sales Act 1928. (Note: Auction Sales Act 1928 (19 Geo. V. No. 3639))
	No. 4145	30 November 1933
An Act to apply out of the Consolidated Revenue the sum of One million one hundred and sixty-one thousand nine hundred and two pounds to the service of the year One thousand nine hundred and thirty-three and One thousand nine hundred and thirty-four.
Port Melbourne Lagoon Lands Act 1933 (repealed)	No. 4147	4 December 1933
An Act to provide for the Closing of Portions of a certain Street in the City of Port Melbourne and for the Transfer to the Crown of certain Lands situate in the said City vested in the Board of Land and Works and for the Validation of the Temporary Reservation of Portion of the said Lands for an Institution for Public Instruction (Kindergarten) and for the Permanent Reservation of another Portion of the said Lands for Public Recreation and of other Portions of the said Lands for Municipal Storage Depots, and for other purposes. (Repealed by Statute Law Revision Act 1984 (No. 10087))
Melbourne Cricket Ground Act 1933	No. 4149	4 December 1933
An Act relating to a Ground known as the Melbourne Cricket Ground.
Administration and Probate Duties Act 1933	No. 4159	29 December 1933
An Act to continue Part III. of the Finance Act 1930 (Note: Finance Act 1930 (No. 3889)) as amended by the Administration and Probate Duties Act 1931 (Note: Administration and Probate Duties Act 1931 (No. 4017)) and the Administration and Probate Duties Act 1932. (Note: Administration and Probate Duties Act 1932 (No. 4066))
University (Grant) Act 1933	No. 4166	29 December 1933
An Act to amend Section Thirty-four of the University Act 1928. (Note: University Act 1928 (19 Geo. V. No. 3795))
Unemployment Relief Loan and Application Act 1933 (repealed)	No. 4173	29 December 1933
An Act to amend Sections Three and Eight of the Unemployment Relief Loan and Application Act 1932. (Note: Unemployment Relief Loan and Application Act 1932 (No. 4097)) (Repealed by Treasury Legislation (Repeal) Act 2005 (No. 73 of 2005))
Avoca Water Trust Act 1933	No. 4175	29 December 1933
An Act to constitute the Quambatook Urban District a Waterworks District and to place the same under the Jurisdiction and Control of the State Rivers and Water Supply Commission, to relieve the Avoca Water Trust from Payments in respect of certain Advances made by the Governor in Council to the said Trust, to abolish the said Trust, and for other purposes.
Ballaarat Lands Act 1933 (repealed)	No. 4177	29 December 1933
An Act to amend the Ballaarat Lands Act 1930. (Note: Ballaarat Lands Act 1930 (No. 3859)) (Repealed by Statute Law Revision Act 1984 (No. 10087))
Milk Board Act 1933	No. 4183	29 December 1933
An Act to repeal the Milk Board Act 1932 (Note: Milk Board Act 1932 (No. 4014)) and to make provision for the Appointment of a Milk Board and for the Powers and Duties thereof, and for other purposes.
Melbourne Market and Park Lands Act 1933	No. 4184	29 December 1933
An Act to provide for the Revocation of the Permanent Reservation and of the Crown Grants for certain Market Purposes of certain Lands situate in the City of Melbourne and for the Permanent Reservation and Crown Grants thereof for Municipal Purposes and for the Temporary Reservation of certain other Land situate therein and for the Surrender of the Crown Grants of certain other Lands situate therein and for the Control and Management of certain Lands situate therein and for relieving the Government of Victoria from the Payment of certain Moneys, and for other purposes.
Railway Loan Application Act 1933	No. 4189	29 December 1933
An Act to sanction the Issue and Application of certain Sums of Money available under Loan Acts for Railways and for other purposes.
Melbourne Lands Exchange Act 1933 (repealed)	No. 4190	29 December 1933
An Act relating to the Transfer to His Majesty by the Commonwealth of Australia of certain Land in the City of Melbourne and to make provision for the Temporary Reservation as a Site for Ornamental Plantations of the said Land when so transferred and for the Revocation of the Permanent Reservation and Crown Grant of certain other Land in the said City permanently reserved as a Site for Public Park and for the Grant thereof together with certain other Crown Land to the Commonwealth of Australia, and for other purposes. (Repealed by Statute Law Revision Act 1984 (No. 10087))
Statute Law Revision Act 1933	No. 4191	29 December 1933
An Act to revise the Statute Law and for other purposes.
Ararat Borough (Alexandra Sports Ground) Act 1933	No. 4193	29 December 1933
An Act to authorize the Council of the Borough of Ararat to expend certain Moneys in the Payment of certain Debts owing by the Alexandra Sports Ground Committee, and for other purposes.
Kew and Heidelberg Lands Act 1933	No. 4194	29 December 1933
An Act to provide for the Revocation of the Permanent Reservation of certain Lands situate in the Shire of Heidelberg and in the City of Kew permanently reserved respectively as a Site for Public Park and Recreation and as a Site for Lunatic Asylum and for the Revocation of the Permanent Reservation and Crown Grant of certain Lands situate in the said City permanently reserved as a Site for Public Park and for the closing of certain Roads situate in the said City and for the Proclamation of certain Lands situate in the said City as Public Highways and for the Permanent Reservation of certain Lands situate in the said Shire and in the said City as a Site for a Public Park and Recreation and for the Grant thereof to Trustees and for the Temporary Reservation of certain Land situate in the said City as a Site for a Mental Hospital, and for other purposes.
Dairy Products Act 1933	No. 4204	29 December 1933
An Act relating to Dairy Products and for other purposes.
Barramunga Lands Act 1933	No.	
Bees Act 1933	No.	
Brighton Loan Act 1933	No.	
Brunswick (Street Construction) Act 1933	No.	
Bush Fire Brigades Act 1933	No.	
Camberwell Loans Act 1933	No.	
Carlton Land Act 1933	No.	
Children's Welfare Act 1933	No.	
City of Chelsea (Rating Validation) Act 1933	No.	
City of Collingwood (Gratuities) Act 1933	No.	
City of Kew (Thornton-street) Act 1933	No.	
City of Sandringham (Rating Validation) Act 1933	No.	
Closer Settlement (Financial) Act 1933	No.	
Closer Settlement Act 1933	No.	
Companies (List and Summary) Act 1933	No.	
Country Roads (Borrowing) Act 1933	No.	
Country Roads Board Fund Act 1933	No.	
Cultivation Advances (Borrowing) Act 1933	No.	
Cultivation Advances Act 1933	No.	
Director of Finance Act 1933	No.	
Domain (Melbourne) Land Act 1933	No.	
Education (Fees) Act 1933	No.	
Farm Produce Agents Act 1933	No.	
Farmers Relief Act 1933	No.	
Financial Emergency (Continuation) Act 1933	No.	
Footscray Loan Act 1933	No.	
Forests (Roads) Act 1933	No.	
Fruit and Vegetables Act 1933	No.	
Fruit Growers Relief (Commonwealth Payment) Act 193	No.	
Fyansford Land Act 1933	No.	
Gas Regulation Act 1933	No.	
Geelong Harbor Trust (Government Guarantee) Act 1933	No.	
Geelong Waterworks and Sewerage Act 1933	No.	
Hawthorn Loans Act 1933	No.	
Hospitals and Charities Act 1933	No.	
Income Tax Act 1933	No.	
Income Tax Acts Amendment Act 1933	No.	
Keilor Loan Act 1933	No.	
Land Act 1933	No.	
Land Tax Act 1933	No.	
Landlord and Tenant Act 1933	No.	
Libraries (Amendment) Act 1933	No.	
Local Government (Shire of Heidelberg) Act 1933	No.	
Loddon United Waterworks Trust Act 1933	No.	
Maintenance Act 1933	No.	
Maribyrnong Lands Exchange Act 1933	No.	
Medical Act 1933	No.	
Melbourne and Metropolitan Board of Works (Borrowing Powers) Act 1933	No.	
Melbourne and Metropolitan Tramways Board Act 1933	No.	
Mental Hygiene Act 1933	No.	
Motor Car Act 1933	No.	
Municipal Association Act 1933	No.	
Public Works Loan Application Act 1933	No.	
Real Estate Agents and Business Agents Act 1933	No.	
Shrine of Remembrance Site Act 1933	No.	
Stamps Act 1933	No.	
State Electricity Commission (Trading) Act 1933	No.	
State Forests Loan Application Act 1933	No.	
Street Meetings Act 1933	No.	
Superannuation (Retirement) Act 1933	No.	
Superannuation Act 1933	No.	
Swine Act 1933	No.	
Teachers Act 1933	No.	
Transfer of Land (Assurance Fund) Act 1933	No.	
Transport Regulation Act 1933	No.	
Treasury Bonds Act 1933	No.	
Trustee (Investments) Act 1933	No.	
Unemployment Relief Tax (Assessment) Act 1933	No.	
Unemployment Relief Tax (Rates) Act 1933	No.	
Water Supply Loans Application Act 1933	No.	
Wheat Growers Relief (Commonwealth Payment) Act 1933	No.	

== Sources ==
- "1933 Victorian Historical Acts". AustLII.
