= Burma Independence Act 1947 =

Act of the Parliament of the United Kingdom

Burma Independence Act 1947 (Note: Section 5(1).)
- Act of Parliament
- Parliament of the United Kingdom
- Long title: An Act to provide for the independence of Burma as a country not within His Majesty's dominions and not entitled to His Majesty's protection, and for consequential and connected matters.
- Citation: 11 & 12 Geo. 6. c. 3
- Introduced by: Clement Attlee, Prime Minister (Commons)
- Territorial extent: United Kingdom

Dates
- Royal assent: 10 December 1947
- Commencement: 4 January 1948 (Note: Section 1(1).)
- Repealed: 16 November 1989
Other legislation
Amends	Evidence by Commission Act 1859; Admiralty Jurisdiction (India) Act 1860; Colonial Laws Validity Act 1865; Colonial Prisoners Removal Act 1884; Colonial Courts of Admiralty Act 1890
Repeals/revokes	Government of Burma Act 1935; Government of Burma (Temporary Provisions) Act 1945
Amended by	Statute Law Revision Act 1953; Statute Law (Repeals) Act 1977
Repealed by	Statute Law (Repeals) Act 1989

Status: Repealed

Text of statute as originally enacted

The Burma Independence Act 1947 (11 & 12 Geo. 6. c. 3) was an act of the Parliament of the United Kingdom that conferred independence on Burma, today called Myanmar. The act received royal assent on 10 December 1947. The Union of Burma came into being on 4 January 1948 as an independent republic outside the Commonwealth.

== Passage ==
Prime Minister Clement Attlee introduced the bill in Parliament for its second reading. He explained that its purpose was to give effect to the will of the peoples of Burma as expressed by their elected representatives that their country should become an independent state, should cease to be part of the British Commonwealth of Nations and should no longer form part of the king's dominions. He explained that in the future, the relationship between Burma and the United Kingdom would be based on a treaty and on friendship. He expressed his government's regret that Burma had chosen not to become a British Dominion and instead would leave the Commonwealth. He explained that the United Kingdom government had a duty to see to it that "minorities for whom we had a special responsibility were given due position under the new Constitution” and reported that he was satisfied that that was the case.

The Prime Minister also provided Parliament with an overview of the historic relationship between the United Kingdom and Burma. He reported that the earliest connections with Burma derive from the activities of the East India Company, that Burma at that time was a kingdom, and that the whole country was annexed by the United Kingdom in 1886. Effective British rule over the whole of Burma has lasted just over 60 years.

He reported too that in May 1945, a statement of United Kingdom government policy concerning Burma was issued. It envisaged the drawing up of a constitution by representatives of the Burmese people with a view to full self-government. The formation of a Burmese government under Aung San followed with elections to a Constituent Assembly in which the party of Aung San won a majority. A series of meetings between UK and the Burmese leaders followed too. The Prime Minister reported that one of the most difficult problems in framing any constitution for Burma was the position of the tribes of the hill country, the Chins, the Kachins, the Shans of the Shan States, and the minority community of the Karens, these peoples having been administered under separate administration until they were brought under Burmese administration under the Government of Burma Act 1935. He concluded his remarks by remarking that he believed the future of Burma "should be bright".

The Leader of the Opposition, Winston Churchill delivered a scathing attack on the United Kingdom government's handling of the question of Burma. He regretted that the legislation would amount to "sweeping away our position" in Burma. He pointed out that the aim outlined in the United Kingdom government white paper of May 1945 was for Burma to attain Dominion status, subject to its prior attainment of certain political milestones. He believed there would have been no difficulty in carrying out that programme in an orderly and careful manner. Instead, he said "the whole business has been conducted by the British Government from weakness and not from strength". He argued that British Dominion status was an indispensable stage in any policy which ought to have been pursued. He deplored that the legislation would "cut Burma out of the Empire altogether, and ... make her a foreign Power". Churchill said "the British Empire seems to be running off almost as fast as the American Loan". He deplored the "extraordinary haste". Churchill criticised the character of Burmese leaders, calling Aung San a "traitor rebel leader" for having gone over to the Japanese during the recent war. He criticized U Saw, who had been interned during the war, in similar terms. He dryly criticised the government for putting the future of Burma in the hands of such "outstanding authorities". Churchill also said there were "grave doubts that the assent of the frontier tribes has been honestly and genuinely given" to the new constitutional arrangements.

The bill which would become the act was approved on 5 November 1947 by a vote of 288 in favour with 114 against.

== Provisions ==
The act's most important provisions were:

- that Burma would become an independent country on 4 January 1948.
- that the suzerainty of the British King over the part of Burma at the time known as the Karenni States would end on 4 January 1948.
- that, generally, British subjects whose status as British subjects was due to a connection to Burma, would cease to be regarded as British subjects on 4 January 1948.

== Subsequent developments ==
Section 3 of the act was repealed by section 1(1) of, and part XV of schedule 1 to, the Statute Law (Repeals) Act 1977, which came into force on 16 June 1977.

The whole act was repealed by section 1(1) of, and part VI of schedule 1 to, the Statute Law (Repeals) Act 1989, which came into force on 16 November 1989.

== See also ==
- History of Myanmar
