= Colonial Laws Validity Act 1865 =

Act of the Parliament of the United Kingdom

Colonial Laws Validity Act 1865 (Note: The citation of this act by this short title was authorised by section 1 of, and the first schedule to, the Short Titles Act 1896. Due to the repeal of those provisions it is now authorised by section 19(2) of the Interpretation Act 1978.)
- Act of Parliament
- Parliament of the United Kingdom
- Long title: An Act to remove Doubts as to the Validity of Colonial Laws.
- Citation: 28 & 29 Vict. c. 63
- Territorial extent: United Kingdom

Dates
- Royal assent: 29 June 1865
- Commencement: 29 June 1865 (Note: The Acts of Parliament (Commencement) Act 1793.)
Other legislation
| Amended by | Statute Law Revision Act 1893; Statute of Westminster 1931; Burma Independence Act 1947; Statute Law (Repeals) Act 1976; Belize Act 1981; Australia Act 1986; Statute Law (Repeals) Act 1989 |

Status: Amended

Text of statute as originally enacted

Revised text of statute as amended

Text of the Colonial Laws Validity Act 1865 as in force today (including any amendments) within the United Kingdom, from legislation.gov.uk.

The Colonial Laws Validity Act 1865 (28 & 29 Vict. c. 63) is an act of the Parliament of the United Kingdom. Its long title is "An Act to remove Doubts as to the Validity of Colonial Laws".

The purpose of the act was to remove any apparent inconsistency between local (colonial) and British (imperial) legislation. Thus it confirmed that colonial legislation (provided it had been passed in the proper manner) was to have full effect within the colony, limited only to the extent that it was not in contradiction with ("repugnant to") any act of the British Parliament that specifically applied to that colony. This clarified and strengthened the position of colonial legislatures, while at the same time restating their ultimate subordination to the Westminster Parliament.

Until the passage of the act, a number of colonial statutes had been struck down by local judges on the grounds of repugnancy to English laws, whether or not those English laws had been intended by Parliament to be effective in the colony. This had been a particular problem for the government in South Australia, where Justice Benjamin Boothby had struck down local statutes on numerous occasions in the colony's Supreme Court.

By the mid-1920s, the British government accepted that the dominions should have full legislative autonomy. Accordingly, the imperial Parliament passed the Statute of Westminster 1931 (22 & 23 Geo. 5. c. 4), which repealed the application of the 1865 act to the dominions (i.e., Australia, Canada, the Irish Free State, New Zealand, Newfoundland, and the Union of South Africa).

The Statute of Westminster took effect immediately in Canada, the Irish Free State and South Africa. Australia adopted the Statute in 1942 with the passing of the Statute of Westminster Adoption Act 1942, with retroactive effect to 3 September 1939, the start of World War II. The Colonial Laws Validity Act 1865 continued to have application in individual Australian states until the Australia Act 1986 came into effect in 1986.

New Zealand adopted the Statute of Westminster in 1947.

Newfoundland never adopted the Statute of Westminster. Instead, facing grave financial difficulties as a result of the Great Depression, Newfoundland gave up responsible government in 1934. The Colonial Laws Validity Act continued to apply to Newfoundland, which was from then on ruled by an appointed Governor and Commission of Government until, in 1949, Newfoundland joined Canada as its tenth province.

Elsewhere, the Colonial Laws Validity Act 1865 remains in force, and helps to define the relationship between acts of Parliament and laws passed in self-governing British territories, as well as the legality of decisions made by territorial legislatures and governments. The power to amend the Colonial Laws Validity Act 1865 rests with the Parliament of the United Kingdom.

== Subsequent developments ==
In section 1, the words "British India" were repealed by section 1(1) of, and part VI of schedule 1 to, the Statute Law (Repeals) Act 1976, which came into force on 27 May 1976.

Section 7 of the act was repealed by section 1(1) of, and part VI of schedule 1 to, the Statute Law (Repeals) Act 1989, which came into force on 16 November 1989.

== See also ==
- Statute of Westminster 1931
- Canada Act 1982
- Australia Act 1986
- Constitution Act 1986
