= Statutory Rules (Northern Ireland) Order 1979 =

Order in Council for Northern Ireland

Statutory Rules (Northern Ireland) Order 1979 (Note: Section 1.)
- Statutory Instrument
- Parliament of the United Kingdom
- Citation: SI 1979/1573
- Territorial extent: Northern Ireland

Dates
- Made: 3 December 1979
- Commencement: 3 January 1980

Other legislation
- Repeals/revokes: Zebra, Pelican and Puffin Pedestrian Crossings Regulations and General Directions 1997; Traffic Signs (Temporary Obstructions) Regulations 1997; Traffic Signs Regulations and General Directions 2002; School Crossing Patrol Sign (England and Wales) Regulations 2006
- Made under: Northern Ireland Act 1974
- Amended by: Building Societies Act 1986; Social Security (Consequential Provisions) (Northern Ireland) Act 1992

Status: Amended

Text of statute as originally enacted

Revised text of statute as amended

Text of the Statutory Rules (Northern Ireland) Order 1979 as in force today (including any amendments) within the United Kingdom, from legislation.gov.uk.

The Statutory Rules (Northern Ireland) Order 1979 (SI 1979/1573 (NI 12)) is an order in Council for Northern Ireland of the United Kingdom Parliament which governs the making of statutory rules.

The order repeals the Statutory Rules Act (Northern Ireland) 1958 (c. 18 (N.I.)), replacing all references to it in existing legislation with references to the order.

The Statutory Instruments Act 1946 provides a similar function for statutory instruments under the acts of the Parliament of the United Kingdom. Previously the Statutory Instruments Act 1946 provided a similar for Welsh statutory instruments (until 2020) and Scottish statutory instruments (until 2011).

== Definitions ==
The act defines statutory rules as "orders, rules, regulations or byelaws" if the power is conferred by:

- any act of the Parliament of Northern unless the power is to be expressed by statutory instrument
- any act or measure of the Assembly, unless the power is expressed to be exercisable by statutory instrument
- any act of the Parliament of the United Kingdom passed before 1st January 1974, if the power relates to any matter in respect of which the Parliament of Northern Ireland had power to make laws and is not expressed to be exercisable by statutory instrument;
- any act of the Parliament of the United Kingdom passed after 1st January 1974, if the power is expressed to be exercisable by statutory rule

== Procedure ==
=== Draft statutory rules ===
Draft statutory rules may be published.

=== Consideration by examiner ===
An examiner considers all statutory rules and releases an annual report.

=== Consideration by committee ===
The individual committees of the Northern Ireland Assembly consider statutory rules for their individual departments.

=== Laying before the Assembly ===
Statutory rules are required to be laid before the Assembly to come into force.

=== Revocation ===
Statutory rules may be revoked by statutory rule, Order in Council for Northern Ireland, by an act of Parliament, and by an act of the Assembly.

== Publication ==
Originally the order stated that statutory rules are to be published by the Government Printer known today as the King's Printer. In the modern era, this means that they are available on legislation.gov.uk.
