= Colonial Prisoners Removal Act 1884 =

Act of the Parliament of the United Kingdom

Colonial Prisoners Removal Act 1884 (Note: Section 1.)
- Act of Parliament
- Parliament of the United Kingdom
- Long title: An Act to make further provision respecting the removal of Prisoners and Criminal Lunatics from Her Majesty's possessions out of the United Kingdom.
- Citation: 47 & 48 Vict. c. 31
- Territorial extent: United Kingdom; Channel Islands; Isle of Man; (Note: Section 14.)

Dates
- Royal assent: 28 July 1884
- Commencement: 28 July 1884 (Note: The Acts of Parliament (Commencement) Act 1793.)
Other legislation
Amended by	Statute Law Revision Act 1898; Government of India (Adaptation of Acts of Parliament) Order 1937; Burma Independence Act 1947; Revision of the Army and Air Force Acts (Transitional Provisions) Act 1955; Mental Health Act 1959; Mental Health (Scotland) Act 1960; Statute Law Revision Act 1963; Statute Law (Repeals) Act 1976; Armed Forces Act 1981; Mental Health Act 1983; Mental Health (Scotland) Act 1984; Statute Law (Repeals) Act 1986; Domestic Violence, Crime and Victims Act 2004
Relates to	Army Act 1881

Status: Amended

Text of statute as originally enacted

Revised text of statute as amended

Text of the Colonial Prisoners Removal Act 1884 as in force today (including any amendments) within the United Kingdom, from legislation.gov.uk.

The Colonial Prisoners Removal Act 1884 (47 & 48 Vict. c. 31) is an act of the Parliament of the United Kingdom whereby prisoners in British colonies may be transferred to the United Kingdom to serve their sentence.

The legislation was used as recently as May 2020 when a man convicted of robbery in the Cayman Islands and in prison there, was transported to prison in the UK.

== Subsequent developments ==
In section 16(2) of the act, the words from " nor any provisions " onwards were repealed by section 1 of, and the schedule to, the Statute Law Revision Act 1963, which came into force on 31 July 1963.

Section 14A and in section 18, the words "and subject, as respects India, to the provisions of section fourteen A of this Act", and in the definition of "British possession", the words "which are not part of India", were repealed by section 1(1) of, and part VII of schedule 1 to, the Statute Law (Repeals) Act 1976, which came into force on 27 May 1976. Section 31 of the act was repealed by section 1(1) of, and part XIV of schedule 1 to, the 1976 act.
