= List of statutory instruments of the United Kingdom, 1979 =

This is an incomplete list of statutory instruments of the United Kingdom in 1979.

== Statutory instruments ==
=== 1-499 ===
==== 1–100 ====
- Motor Fuel (Lead Content of Petrol) (Amendment) Regulations 1979 S.I. 1979/1
- Local Government Superannuation (Amendment) Regulations 1979 S.I. 1979/2
- Petrol Prices (Display) (Amendment) Order 1979 S.I. 1979/4
- Civil Aviation (Air Travel Organisers' Licensing) (Third Amendment) Regulations 1979 (SI 1979/5)
- Social Security (Contributions, Re-rating) Consequential Amendment Regulations 1979 S.I. 1979/9
- Industrial Training Levy (Footwear, Leather and Fur Skin) Order 1979 S.I. 1979/11
- Agriculture (Miscellaneous Provisions) Act 1968 (Amendment) Regulations 1979 (SI 1979/25)
- Cereals Marketing Act 1965 (Amendment) Regulations 1979 (SI 1979/26)
- Food Hygiene (Ships) Regulations 1979 S.I. 1979/27
- General Medical Council (Review Board for Overseas Qualified Practitioners Rules) Order of Council 1979 S.I. 1979/29
- Protection of Wrecks (Designation No. 1) Order 1979 S.I. 1979/31
- Butter Prices (Amendment) Order 1979 S.I. 1979/34
- Rules of the Supreme Court (Amendment) 1979 S.I. 1979/35
- Medicines (Prescription Only) Amendment Order 1979 S.I. 1979/36
- Diseases of Animals (Approved Disinfectants) (Amendment) Order 1979 S.I. 1979/37
- Measuring Instruments (Intoxicating Liquor) (Amendment) Regulations 1979 S.I. 1979/41
- Goods Vehicles (Authorisation of International Journeys) (Fees) (Amendment) Regulations 1979 S.I. 1979/42
- Balloon-Making Compounds (Safety) Order 1979 S.I. 1979/44
- The Medicines (Exemptions from Restrictions on the Retail Sale or Supply of Veterinary Drugs) Order 1979 S.I. 1979/45
- Teachers' Superannuation (Policy Schemes) Regulations 1979 S.I. 1979/47
- Nurses and Enrolled Nurses (Amendment) Rules Approval Instrument 1979 S.I. 1979/49
- National Health Service (Preservation of Boards of Governors) Order 1979 S.I. 1979/51
- Protection of Wrecks (Designation No. 1 and No. 4 Orders 1978) (Amendment) Order 1979 S.I. 1979/56
- Wild Birds (Special Protection in Severe Weather) Order 1979 S.I. 1979/70
- Haddock (West of Scotland and Rockall) Licensing Order 1979 S.I. 1979/71
- Isles of Scilly (Functions) Order 1979 S.I. 1979/72
- Police Cadets (Pensions) (Amendment) Regulations 1979 S.I. 1979/75
- Special Constables (Pensions) (Amendment) Regulations 1979 S.I. 1979/76
- Measuring Instruments (EEC Requirements) (Amendment) Regulations 1979 S.I. 1979/80
- Tweeddale District (Electoral Arrangements) Order 1979 S.I. 1979/84
- Road Traffic Act 1974 (Commencement No. 1) (Scotland) Order 1979 (SI 1979/85) (C.2) (S.3)
- Firearms (Variation of Fees) Order 1979 S.I. 1979/86
- Harford and Ivybridge (Areas) Order 1979 S.I. 1979/90
- Firearms (Variation of Fees) (Scotland) Order 1979 S.I. 1979/91 (S.4)
- Pensions Appeal Tribunals (Scotland) (Amendment) Rules 1979 S.I. 1979/94 (S.7)
- Act of Adjournal (Criminal Legal Aid Fees Amendment) 1979 S.I. 1979/95 (S.8)
- Liverpool—Leeds Trunk Road (Micklethorn to Broughton Bridge Access Road Improvement) Order 1979 S.I. 1979/96
- Merchant Shipping (Repatriation) Regulations 1979 S.I. 1979/97
- Wild Birds (Special Protection in Severe Weather) (Scotland) Order 1979 S.I. 1979/99 (S.10)
- Housing Support Grant (Scotland) Order 1979 S.I. 1979/100 (S.11)

== 101–200 ==
- The Anti-Dumping Duty (Revocation) Order 1979 S.I. 1979/104
- The County Court Funds (Amendment) Rules 1979 S.I. 1979/105
- Supreme Court Funds (Amendment) Rules 1979 S.I. 1979/106 (L.3)
- The Colouring Matter in Food (Scotland) Amendment Regulations 1979 S.I. 1979/107 (S.12)
- The Foreign Compensation (Financial Provisions) Order 1979 S.I. 1979/109
- The Merchant Shipping (Confirmation of Legislation) (South Australia) Order 1979 S.I. 1979/110
- Statute Law (Repeals) Act 1976 (Colonies) Order 1979 (SI 1979/111)
- General Medical Council (Constitution) Order 1979 S.I. 1979/112
- The Naval, Military and Air Forces etc. (Disablement and Death) Service Pensions Amendment Order 1979 S.I. 1979/113
- Independent Broadcasting Authority Act 1973 (Channel Islands) Order 1979 (SI 1979/114)
- The Reciprocal Enforcement of Maintenance Orders (Designation of Reciprocating Countries) Order 1979 S.I. 1979/115
- The Maintenance Orders (Facilities for Enforcement) (Revocation) Order 1979 S.I. 1979/116
- The Double Taxation Relief (Taxes on Income) (Austria) Order 1979 S.I. 1979/117
- The Double Taxation Relief (Taxes on Income) (Norway) Order 1979 S.I. 1979/118
- Control of Off-Street Parking (Scotland) Order 1979 S.I. 1979/119
- The Merchant Shipping (Foreign Deserters) (Disapplication) Order 1979 S.I. 1979/120
- The Agricultural Levy Reliefs (Frozen Beef and Veal) Order 1979 S.I. 1979/121
- Judicature (Northern Ireland) Act 1978 (Commencement No. 3) Order 1979 (SI 1979/124) (C.3)
- Children and Young Persons Act 1969 (Transitional Modifications of Part I) Order 1979 (SI 1979/125)
- The Distribution of Footwear (Prices) (Amendment) Order 1979 S.I. 1979/129
- The Alcohol Tables Regulations 1979 S.I. 1979/132
- The Seeds (National Lists of Varieties) Regulations 1979 S.I. 1979/133
- The Rabies Virus Order 1979 S.I. 1979/135
- The Export of Goods (Control) (Amendment) Order 1979 S.I. 1979/136
- The Motor Vehicles (Construction and Use) (Amendment) Regulations 1979 S.I. 1979/138
- The Town and Country Planning (Repeal of Provisions No. 14) (Isle of Wight) Order 1979 S.I. 1979/139
- Town and Country Planning Act 1971 (Commencement No. 42) (Isle of Wight) Order 1979 (SI 1979/140) (C. 4)
- The Wild Birds (Special Protection in Severe Weather) (Scotland) (No. 2) Order 1979 S.I. 1979/141 (S.13)
- The Ancillary Dental Workers (Amendment) Regulations 1979 S.I. 1979/142
- The Registration of Births, Deaths and Marriages (Fees) (Scotland) Regulations 1979 S.I. 1979/143 (S.14)
- The Marriage Fees (Scotland) Regulations 1979 S.I. 1979/144 (S.15)
- The Aviation Security Fund (Amendment) Regulations 1979 S.I. 1979/145
- The General Betting Duty (Amendment) Regulations (Northern Ireland) 1979 S.I. 1979/146
- The New Forest (Parishes) Order 1979 S.I. 1979/148
- The Registration of Births, Deaths and Marriages (Fees) Order 1979 S.I. 1979/149
- The Customs Duties (ECSC) (Quota and Other Reliefs) (Amendment) Order 1979 S.I. 1979/153
- The Civil Aviation (Route Charges for Navigation Services) (Second Amendment) Regulations 1979 S.I. 1979/154
- The Customs Duties (ECSC) Anti-Dumping (Amendment) Order 1979 S.I. 1979/155
- The Legal Advice and Assistance (Scotland) (Financial Conditions) (No. 1) Regulations 1979 S.I. 1979/156 (S.16)
- The North East Fife District (Electoral Arrangements) Order 1979 S.I. 1979/158
- The Caithness District (Electoral Arrangements) Order 1979 S.I. 1979/159
- The Family Income Supplements (General) Amendment Regulations 1979 S.I. 1979/160
- The Export of Goods (Control) (Amendment No. 2) Order 1979 S.I. 1979/164
- The British Aerospace (Design, Development and Production of Civil Aircraft) (Payments) Order 1978 S.I. 1979/165
- The Legal Advice and Assistance (Financial Conditions) Regulations 1979 S.I. 1979/166
- The Prevention of Terrorism (Supplemental Temporary Provisions) (Northern Ireland) (Amendment) Order 1979 S.I. 1979/168
- The Prevention of Terrorism (Supplemental Temporary Provisions) (Amendment) Order 1979 S.I. 1979/169
- The Magistrates' Courts (Reciprocal Enforcement of Maintenance Orders) (Amendment) Rules 1979 S.I. 1979/170 (L.4)
- Social Security Pensions Act 1975 (Commencement No. 13) Order 1979 (SI 1979/171) (C. 5)
- The Mobility Allowance Amendment Regulations 1979 S.I. 1979/172
- The Prices and Charges (Notification of Increases) (Amendment No. 2) Order 1979 S.I. 1979/178
- The Export Guarantees (Extension of Period) Order 1979 S.I. 1979/180
- The Customs Duties (ECSC) Provisional Anti-Dumping Order 1979 S.I. 1979/181
- The Industrial Training Levy (Knitting, Lace and Net) Order 1979 S.I. 1979/184
- The Industrial Training Levy (Petroleum) Order 1979 S.I. 1979/185
- Public Trustee (Fees) (Amendment) Order 1979 S.I. 1979/189
- Act of Sederunt (Sessions of Court and Sederunt Days) 1979 S.I. 1979/190 (S.19)
- The Customs Duties (ECSC) Provisional Anti Dumping (No. 2) Order 1979 S.I. 1979/191
- The Royal Navy Terms of Service (Amendment) Regulations 1979 S.I. 1979/192
- The Paraffin (Maximum Retail Prices) (Third Amendment) Order 1979 S.I. 1979/193
- The Parochial Fees Order 1979 S.I. 1979/194
- Payments to Redundant Churches Fund Order 1979 S.I. 1979/195
- The Immigration (Registration with Police) (Amendment) Regulations 1979 S.I. 1979/196

== 201–300 ==
- Town and Country Planning Act 1971 (Commencement No. 43) (West Berkshire) Order 1979 (SI 1979/200) (C. 6)
- Town and Country Planning Act 1971 (Commencement No. 44) (Oxfordshire) Order 1979 (SI 1979/201) (C. 7)
- The Town and Country Planning (Repeal of Provisions No. 15) (West Berkshire) Order 1979 S.I. 1979/202
- The Town and Country Planning (Repeal of Provisions No. 16) (Oxfordshire) Order 1979 S.I. 1979/203
- The New Towns (Limit on Borrowing) Order 1979 S.I. 1979/204
- The Customs Warehousing Regulations 1979 S.I. 1979/207
- The Excise Warehousing Regulations 1979 S.I. 1979/208
- The Companies (Winding-up) (Amendment) Rules 1979 S.I. 1979/209
- The Judicial Pensions (Widows' and Children's Benefits) (Amendment) Regulations 1979 S.I. 1979/210
- The Ironstone Restoration Fund (Standard Rate) Order 1979 S.I. 1979/211
- The Local Authorities' Traffic Orders (Procedure) (Scotland) Amendment Regulations 1979 S.I. 1979/213 (S.21)
- The Secretary of State's Traffic Orders (Procedure) (Scotland) Amendment Regulations 1979 S.I. 1979/214 (S.22)
- The Royal Air Force Terms of Service (Amendment) Regulations 1979 S.I. 1979/215
- The Misuse of Drugs (Licence Fees) Regulations 1979 S.I. 1979/218
- The European Assembly Elections (Day of Election) Order 1979 S.I. 1979/219
- The European Assembly Elections (Returning Officers) (England and Wales) Order 1979 S.I. 1979/220
- The Agricultural or Forestry Tractors and Tractor Components (Type Approval) Regulations 1979 S.I. 1979/221
- The Sugar Beet (Research and Education) Order 1979 S.I. 1979/222
- The Social Security (Hospital In-Patients) Amendment Regulations 1979 S.I. 1979/223
- The Value Added Tax (Supplies by Retailers) (Amendment) Regulations 1979 S.I. 1979/224
- Act of Sederunt (Suspension of Business) 1979 (SI 1979/226) (S. 24)
- The Local Government (Rate Product) (Scotland) Amendment Regulations 1979 S.I. 1979/227 (S.25)
- The Water Authorities (Collection of Charges) Order 1979 S.I. 1979/228
- The Prices and Charges (Safeguard for Basic Profits) Regulations 1979 S.I. 1979/229
- The Customs Duties (ECSC) Provisional Anti-Dumping (No. 3) Order 1979 S.I. 1979/231
- Act of Adjournal (Suspension of Sittings etc.) 1979 (SI 1979/232)
- The Cycle Racing on Highways (Special Authorisation) (England and Wales) Regulations 1979 S.I. 1979/233
- The Housing Finance (Rent Allowance Subsidy) Order 1979 S.I. 1979/234
- The Domestic Water Rate Product (Scotland) Amendment Regulations 1979 S.I. 1979/235 (S.26)
- The Control of Off-Street Parking outside Greater London (Appeals Procedure) (England and Wales) Regulations 1979 S.I. 1979/236
- The Civil Aviation (Canadian Navigation Services) (Second Amendment) Regulations 1979 S.I. 1979/237
- The Stock Exchange (Designation of Nominees) Order 1979 S.I. 1979/238
- The British Nationality (Amendment) Regulations 1979 S.I. 1979/240
- The Alcoholic Liquors (Amendment of Enactments Relating to Strength and to Units of Measurement) Order 1979 S.I. 1979/241
- The Value Added Tax (Donated Medical Equipment) Order 1979 S.I. 1979/242
- The Value Added Tax (Finance) Order 1979 S.I. 1979/243
- The Value Added Tax (International Services) Order 1979 S.I. 1979/244
- The Value Added Tax (Aids for the Disabled) Order 1979 S.I. 1979/245
- The Value Added Tax (Medical Goods and Services) Order 1979 S.I. 1979/246
- The Milk Marketing Scheme (Amendment) Regulations 1979 S.I. 1979/249
- The Industrial Training Levy (Wool, Jute and Flax) Order 1979 S.I. 1979/251
- The Housing (Improvement of Amenities of Residential Areas) (Scotland) Order 1979 S.I. 1979/253 (S.28)
- The Fishing Boats (Faroe Islands) Designation Order 1979 S.I. 1979/256
- The Eggs Authority (Rates of Levy) Order 1979 S.I. 1979/257
- The Savings Banks (Registrar's Fees) (Amendment) Warrant 1979 S.I. 1979/258
- The Trustee Savings Banks (Amendment) Regulations 1979 S.I. 1979/259
- The Scholarships and Other Benefits (Amendment) Regulations 1979 S.I. 1979/260
- The Legal Aid (General) (Amendment) Regulations 1979 S.I. 1979/263
- The Social Security (Industrial Injuries) (Prescribed Diseases) Amendment Regulations 1979 S.I. 1979/264
- The Social Security (Industrial Injuries) (Prescribed Diseases) Amendment (No. 2) Regulations 1979 S.I. 1979/265
- The Civil Aviation (Navigation Services Charges) (Second Amendment) Regulations 1979 S.I. 1979/267
- The Cod and Whiting (Licensing) Order 1979 S.I. 1979/268
- The Special Development Area (Falmouth) Order 1979 S.I. 1979/269
- The Personal Injuries (Civilians) Amendment Scheme 1979 S.I. 1979/270
- The Export of Goods (Control) (Amendment No. 3) Order 1979 S.I. 1979/276
- The Stock Transfer (Addition of Forms) Order 1979 S.I. 1979/277
- The Daily Telegraph Limited (Prices) Order 1979 S.I. 1979/278
- The Legal Aid (Assessment of Resources) (Amendment) Regulations 1979 S.I. 1979/280
- The Legal Advice and Assistance (Amendment) Regulations 1979 S.I. 1979/281
- The Irish Republic (Termination of 1927 Agreement) Order 1979 S.I. 1979/289
- The Social Security (Reciprocal Agreements) Order 1979 S.I. 1979/290
- The Reserve and Auxiliary Forces (Protection of Civil Interests) (Northern Ireland) Order 1979 S.I. 1979/291
- The European Communities (Definition of Treaties) (ECSC Decision on Supplementary Revenues) Order 1979 S.I. 1979/292
- The Merchant Shipping (Foreign Deserters) (Revocation) Order 1979 (SI 1979/293)
- Aircraft and Shipbuilding Industries (Northern Ireland) Order 1979 (SI 1979/294) (N.I. 1)
- Judgments Enforcement and Debts Recovery (Northern Ireland) Order 1979 (SI 1979/296) (N.I. 3)
- Rates Amendment (Northern Ireland) Order 1979 (SI 1979/297) (N.I. 4)
- The Judgments Enforcement (Consequential Provisions) (Northern Ireland) Order 1979 (SI 1979/298)
- Misuse of Drugs Act 1971 (Modification) Order 1979 (SI 1979/299)
- The Double Taxation Relief (Shipping and Air Transport Profits) (Jordan) Order 1979 (SI 1979/300)

== 301–400 ==
- Double Taxation Relief (Shipping and Air Transport Profits) (Venezuela) Order 1979 (SI 1979/301)
- Double Taxation Relief (Taxes on Income) (Malawi) Order 1979 (SI 1979/302)
- Double Taxation Relief (Taxes on Income) (Norway) (No. 2) Order 1979 (SI 1979/303)
- Arbitration (Foreign Awards) Order 1979 (SI 1979/304)
- Hovercraft (Civil Liability) Order 1979 (SI 1979/305)
- Monegasque Tonnage Order 1979 (SI 1979/306)
- Building Standards (Scotland) Amendment Regulations 1979 (SI 1979/310) (S.29)
- Skye and Lochalsh District (Electoral Arrangements) Order 1979 (SI 1979/312)
- Industrial Training Levy (Iron and Steel) Order 1979 (SI 1979/313)
- Customs Duties (ECSC) Provisional Anti-Dumping (No. 4) Order 1979 (SI 1979/314)
- Medicines (General Sale List) Amendment Order 1979 (SI 1979/315)
- Steamtown Light Railway Order 1979 (SI 1979/317)
- Mines (Precautions Against Inrushes) Regulations 1979 (SI 1979/318)
- Scottish Milk Marketing Schemes (Amendment) Regulations 1979 (SI 1979/319) (S.30)
- Residential Establishments (Payments by Local Authorities) (Scotland) Amendment Order 1979 (SI 1979/320) (S.30)
- Exchange Control (Authorised Dealers and Depositaries) (Amendment) Order 1979 (SI 1979/321)
- European Assembly Elections (Northern Ireland) Regulations 1979 (SI 1979/322)
- Grants for Guarantees of Bank Loans (Extension of Period) Order 1979 (SI 1979/323)
- Legal Aid (Scotland) (Assessment of Resources) Amendment Regulations 1979 (SI 1979/324) (S.32)
- Legal Advice and Assistance (Scotland) Amendment Regulations 1979 (SI 1979/325) (S.33)
- Misuse of Drugs (Amendment) Regulations 1979 (SI 1979/326)
- Princess Parkway, Princess Road (A5103) Manchester Section, Altrincham Road to Riverside Avenue, Northbank Walk (Trunking) Order 1979 (SI 1979/327)
- Town and Country Planning (Repeal of Provisions No. 17) (Humberside) Order 1979 (SI 1979/328)
- Town and Country Planning Act 1971 (Commencement No. 45) (Humberside) Order 1979 (SI 1979/329) (C.8)
- St Helens–Ormskirk–Southport Trunk Road (Prohibition of Waiting) (Clearways) Order 1979 (SI 1979/332)
- State Awards (State Bursaries for Adult Education) (Wales) Regulations 1979 (SI 1979/333)
- House-Building Standards (Approved Scheme etc.) Order 1970 (SI 1979/381)
- Medicines (Chloroform Prohibition) Order 1979 (SI 1979/382)
- Coffee and Coffee Products (Scotland) Regulations 1979 (SI 1979/383) (S.41)
- Bread Prices (No. 2) Order 1976 (Revocation) Order 1979 (SI 1979/384)
- Redundant Mineworkers and Concessionary Coal (Payments Schemes) (Amendment) Order 1979 (SI 1979/385)
- Industrial Training Levy (Air Transport and Travel) Order 1979 (SI 1979/386)
- Industrial Training Levy (Food, Drink and Tobacco) Order 1979 (SI 1979/387)
- Llandeilo-Carmarthen Trunk Road (Penrock Bends Diversion) Order 1979 (SI 1979/388)
- Meat and Livestock Commission Levy Scheme (Confirmation) Order 1979 (SI 1979/393)
- Social Security Pensions Act 1975 (Commencement No. 15) Order 1979 (SI 1979/394) (C. 11)
- Cinematograph Films (Limits of Levy) Order 1979 (SI 1979/395)
- Social Security (Northern Ireland) Order 1979 (SI 1979/396) (N.I. 5)
- Herring By-Catch (Restrictions on Landing) (No. 2) (Variation) Order 1979 (SI 1979/398)
- Matrimonial Causes (Costs) Rules 1979 (SI 1979/399)
- Matrimonial Causes (Amendment) Rules 1979 (SI 1979/400)

== 401–500 ==
- "Pelican" Pedestrian Crossings (Amendment) Regulations and General Directions 1979 (SI 1979/401)
- The Rules of the Supreme Court (Amendment No. 2) 1979 (SI 1979/402) (L. 5)
- Police Pensions (Amendment) Regulations 1979 (SI 1979/406)
- The Firemen's Pension Scheme (Amendment) Order 1979 (SI 1979/407)
- The Insurance Brokers Registration Council (Indemnity Insurance and Grants Scheme) Rules Approval Order 1979 (SI 1979/408)
- The Legal Aid (Scotland) (Financial Conditions) Regulations 1979 (SI 1979/409) (S. 42)
- The Legal Advice and Assistance (Scotland) (Financial Conditions) (No. 2) Regulations 1979 (SI 1979/410) (S.43)
- The Firearms (Variation of Fees) (Scotland) Order 1979 Revocation Order 1979 (SI 1979/411) (S. 44)
- The North of Scotland Hydro-Electric Board (Compensation for Smelter Deficits) Order 1979 (SI 1979/412) (S. 45)
- Vaccine Damage Payments Regulations 1979 (SI 1979/432)
- Extradition (Internationally Protected Persons) Order 1979 (SI 1979/453)

== 501–600 ==
- Customs Duties (Standard Exchange Relief) Regulations 1979 (SI 1979/554)
- Outward Processing Relief Regulations 1979 (SI 1979/555)
- Social Security (Contributions) Regulations 1979 (SI 1979/591)
- Social Security (Overlapping Benefits) Regulations 1979 (SI 1979/597)

== 601–700 ==
- Social Security (Claims and Payments) Regulations 1979 S.I. 1979/628
- Superannuation (Judicial Offices) (Amendment) Rules 1979 S.I. 1979/668
- The Strathclyde Region (Electoral Arrangements) Order 1979 S.I. 1979/673
- Social Security (Earnings Factor) Regulations 1979 S.I. 1979/676
- The Inverness District (Electoral Arrangements) Order 1979 S.I. 1979/698
- The Nairn District (Electoral Arrangements) Order 1979 S.I. 1979/699

== 701–800 ==
- National Health Service (Dental and Optical Charges) (Scotland) Regulations 1979 S.I. 1979/705
- The Borough of Great Yarmouth (Electoral Arrangements) Order 1979 S.I. 1979/710
- Forestry (Felling of Trees) Regulations 1979 S.I. 1979/791
- Industrial Training (Transfer of the Activities of Establishments) Order 1979 S.I. 1979/793

== 801–900 ==
- Clackmannan District (Electoral Arrangements) Order 1979 (SI 1979/821)
- Stirling District (Electoral Arrangements) Order 1979 (SI 1979/822)

== 901–1000 ==
- Inheritance (Provision for Family and Dependants) (Northern Ireland) Order 1979 (SI 1979/924) (N.I. 8)
- Pneumoconiosis, etc., (Workers' Compensation) (Northern Ireland) Order 1979 (SI 1979/925) (N.I. 9)
- Tattooing of Minors (Northern Ireland) Order 1979 (SI 1979/926) (N.I. 10)
- Scotland Act 1978 (Repeal) Order 1979 (SI 1979/928)
- Industrial and Provident Societies (Credit Unions) Regulations 1979 (SI 1979/937)
- The Badenoch and Strathspey District (Electoral Arrangements) Order 1979 (SI 1979/943)
- Administration of Justice Act 1977 (Commencement No. 6) Order 1979 (SI 1979/972)
- Scottish Land Court Rules 1979 (SI 1979/979)

== 1001–1100 ==
- The District of North Wiltshire (Electoral Arrangements) Order 1979 S.I. 1979/1015
- The District of Waverley (Electoral Arrangements) Order 1979 S.I. 1979/1016
- The Borough of Doncaster (Electoral Arrangements) Order 1979 S.I. 1979/1027
- The Borough of Trafford (Electoral Arrangements) Order 1979 S.I. 1979/1028
- Pensions Increase (Review) Order 1979 S.I. 1979/1047
- The District of Wealden (Electoral Arrangements) Order 1979 S.I. 1979/1071
- Motor Vehicles (Designation of Approval Marks) Regulations 1979 S.I. 1979/1088
- The Sutherland District (Electoral Arrangements) Order 1979 S.I. 1979/1096
- The Midlothian District (Electoral Arrangements) Order 1979 S.I. 1979/1097

== 1101–1200 ==
- The District of Newbury (Electoral Arrangements) Order 1979 S.I. 1979/1107
- The District of West Wiltshire (Electoral Arrangements) Order 1979 S.I. 1979/1108
- The District of Teesdale (Electoral Arrangements) Order 1979 S.I. 1979/1109
- The District of Ryedale (Electoral Arrangements) Order 1979 S.I. 1979/1110
- The District of Lewes (Electoral Arrangements) Order 1979 S.I. 1979/1111
- The District of Harborough (Electoral Arrangements) Order 1979 S.I. 1979/1112
- The City of Kingston upon Hull (Electoral Arrangements) Order 1979 S.I. 1979/1113
- The City of Carlisle (Electoral Arrangements) Order 1979 S.I. 1979/1131

== 1201–1300 ==
- Berwickshire District (Electoral Arrangements) Order 1979 (SI 1979/1201)
- Nithsdale District (Electoral Arrangements) Order 1979 (SI 1979/1202)
- Police Pensions (War Service) Regulations 1979 (SI 1979/1259)
- The District of Sedgefield (Electoral Arrangements) Order 1979 (SI 1979/1264)
- District of Wear Valley (Electoral Arrangements) Order 1979 (SI 1979/1265)
- Borough of Worthing (Electoral Arrangements) Order 1979 (SI 1979/1266)
- Yorkshire Dales Light Railway Order 1979 (SI 1979/1270))
- Police Pensions (Amendment) (No. 2) Regulations 1979 (SI 1979/1287)
- City of Edinburgh District (Electoral Arrangements) Order 1979 (SI 1979/1291)
- District of West Norfolk (Electoral Arrangements) Order 1979 (SI 1979/1295)

== 1301–1400 ==
- Reciprocal Enforcement of Maintenance Orders (Hague Convention Countries) Order 1979 S.I. 1979/1317
- The Borough of Calderdale (Electoral Arrangements) Order 1979 S.I. 1979/1320
- The Borough of Bolton (Electoral Arrangements) Order 1979 S.I. 1979/1321
- The City of Coventry (Electoral Arrangements) Order 1979 S.I. 1979/1322
- The Borough of Rotherham (Electoral Arrangements) Order 1979 S.I. 1979/1323
- The Borough of Stockport (Electoral Arrangements) Order 1979 S.I. 1979/1324
- The Borough of Harrogate (Electoral Arrangements) Order 1979 S.I. 1979/1327
- The District of Warwick (Electoral Arrangements) Order 1979 S.I. 1979/1328
- The Borough of Rochdale (Electoral Arrangements) Order 1979 S.I. 1979/1341
- The Dunfermline District (Electoral Arrangements) Order 1979 S.I. 1979/1345
- The Borough of Reading (Electoral Arrangements) Order 1979 S.I. 1979/1346
- The Borough of Poole (Electoral Arrangements) Order 1979 S.I. 1979/1347
- The Borough of St. Helens (Electoral Arrangements) Order 1979 S.I. 1979/1348
- The District of East Devon (Electoral Arrangements) (Amendment) Order 1979 S.I. 1979/1349
- The Borough of Tameside (Electoral Arrangements) Order 1979 S.I. 1979/1368
- Explosives Act 1875 (Exemptions) Regulations 1979 (SI 1979/1378)
- Taximeters (EEC Requirements) Regulations 1979 S.I. 1979/1379

== 1401–1500 ==
- Perth and Kinross District (Electoral Arrangements) Order 1979 (SI 1979/1401)
- East Lothian District (Electoral Arrangements) Order 1979 (SI 1979/1402)
- City of Liverpool (Electoral Arrangements) Order 1979 (SI 1979/1411)
- District of East Lindsey (Electoral Arrangements) Order 1979 (SI 1979/1415)
- National Coal Board Butterwell Light Railway Order 1979 (SI 1979/1421)
- Weights and Measures Local Standards: Periods of Validity) Regulations 1979 (SI 1979/1436)
- Falkirk District (Electoral Arrangements) Order 1979 (SI 1979/1462)
- Borough of Walsall (Electoral Arrangements) Order 1979 (SI 1979/1472)
- City of Exeter (Electoral Arrangements) Order 1979 (SI 1979/1473)
- City of Leicester (Electoral Arrangements) Order 1979 (SI 1979/1474)
- City of Portsmouth (Electoral Arrangements) Order 1979 (SI 1979/1494)
- District of Stroud (Electoral Arrangements) Order 1979 (SI 1979/1495)
- Borough of Torbay (Electoral Arrangements) Order 1979 (SI 1979/1496)

== 1501–1600 ==
- The Borough of Wirral (Electoral Arrangements) Order 1979 S.I. 1979/1523
- The Borough of Wigan (Electoral Arrangements) Order 1979 S.I. 1979/1524
- The Borough of Cheltenham (Electoral Arrangements) Order 1979 S.I. 1979/1525
- Statutory Rules (Northern Ireland) Order 1979 (SI 1979/1573 (N.I. 12))
- Industrial Assurance (Northern Ireland) Order 1979 S.I. 1979/1574 (N.I. 13)
- Administration of Estates (Northern Ireland) Order 1979 S.I. 1979/1575 (N.I. 14)
- Brucellosis (Scotland) Order 1979 S.I. 1979/1596

== 1601–1700 ==
- The City of Sheffield (Electoral Arrangements) Order 1979 S.I. 1979/1615
- The City of Leeds (Electoral Arrangements) Order 1979 S.I. 1979/1616
- Supreme Court Funds (Amendment No. 2) Rules 1979 S.I. 1979/1620
- The City of Bradford (Electoral Arrangements) Order 1979 S.I. 1979/1634
- Immigration (Ports of Entry) (Amendment) Order 1979 S.I. 1979/1635
- The Cunninghame District (Electoral Arrangements) Order 1979 S.I. 1979/1640
- The District of North Bedfordshire (Electoral Arrangements) Order 1979 S.I. 1979/1663
- The Borough of Restormel (Electoral Arrangements) Order 1979 S.I. 1979/1670
- The Borough of Wellingborough (Electoral Arrangements) Order 1979 S.I. 1979/1695
- The Annandale and Eskdale District (Electoral Arrangements) Order 1979 S.I. 1979/1696

== 1701–1800 ==
- Building Regulations (Northern Ireland) Order 1979 S.I. 1979/1709 (N.I. 16)
- Mineral Exploration (Northern Ireland) Order 1979 S.I. 1979/1713 (N.I. 18)
- Perjury (Northern Ireland) Order 1979 S.I. 1979/1714 (N.I. 19)
- The Copyright (International Conventions) Order 1979 S.I. 1979/1715
- Working Standards and Testing Equipment (Testing and Adjustment) (Amendment) Regulations 1979 S.I. 1979/1719
- The Strathclyde Region (Electoral Arrangements) (Amendment) Order 1979 S.I. 1979/1757

== See also ==
- List of statutory instruments of the United Kingdom
