= Coinage Offences Act 1936 =

Act of the Parliament of the United Kingdom

Coinage Offences Act 1936 (Note: Section 18(1).)
- Act of Parliament
- Parliament of the United Kingdom
- Long title: An Act to consolidate the provisions of the Coinage Offences Acts, 1861 and 1935, and of the Counterfeit Medal Act, 1883.
- Citation: 26 Geo. 5 & 1 Edw. 8. c. 16
- Territorial extent: United Kingdom

Dates
- Royal assent: 21 May 1936
- Commencement: 1 August 1936 (Note: Section 18(3).)
- Repealed: 27 October 1981
Other legislation
Amends	See § Repealed enactments
Repeals/revokes	See § Repealed enactments
Amended by	Criminal Justice Act 1948; Criminal Justice (Scotland) Act 1949; Justices of the Peace Act 1968; Statute Law (Repeals) Act 1973; Statute Law (Repeals) Act 1976
Repealed by	Forgery and Counterfeiting Act 1981

Status: Repealed

Text of statute as originally enacted

The Coinage Offences Act 1936 (26 Geo. 5 & 1 Edw. 8. c. 16) was an act of the Parliament of the United Kingdom that consolidated enactments related to coinage offences in the United Kingdom.

== Mode of trial ==
From 1967 to 1971, offences under this act, other than offences under sections 1(1)(a), 2, 9(1), 9(2) and 10 (which created certain offences in relation to the coinage of higher denominations, to coining implements and to the removal of coining implements, coin or bullion from the Mint) were triable by courts of quarter sessions other than courts with restricted jurisdiction.

From 1977, offences under sections 4(1), 5(1), 5(2), 5(3), 5(4), 5(6), 7 and 8 were triable either way.

=== Section 4 ===
Section 4(1) created an offence of "defacing coins".

=== Section 5 ===
Section 5(1) created an offence of "uttering counterfeit coin".

Section 5(2) created an offence of "uttering counterfeit gold or silver coin".

Section 5(3) created an offence of "possession of counterfeit gold or silver coin".

Section 5(4) created an offence of "possession of counterfeit copper coin".

Section 5(6) created an offence of "uttering coins etc as gold or silver coins".

=== Section 7 ===
This section created an offence of "importating and exporting counterfeit coin".

=== Section 8 ===
This section created an offence of "making, possessing or selling medals resembling gold or silver coin".

=== Repealed enactments ===
Section 18(2) of the act repealed 3 enactments, listed in the schedule to the act.

Citation	Short title	Extent of repeal
24 & 25 Vict. c. 99	Coinage Offences Act 1861	The whole act.
46 & 47 Vict. c. 45	Counterfeit Medal Act 1883	The whole act.
25 & 26 Geo. 5. c. 25	Counterfeit Currency (Convention) Act 1935	Subsections (1), (2) and (3) of section three, subsection (3) of section six and Parts I and II of the Schedule.

== Subsequent developments ==
The words "penal servitude or" in section 12(1) were repealed by section 83(3) of, part I of schedule 10 to, the Criminal Justice Act 1948 (11 & 12 Geo. 6. c. 58).

Sections 12(1) and 12(2)(a) were repealed by section 10(2) of, and part III of schedule 3 to, the Criminal Law Act 1967, which came into force on 1 January 1968.

Section 4(4) was repealed by section 1(1) of, and the part XIX of schedule 1 to, the Statute Law (Repeals) Act 1973, which came into force on 18 July 1973.

Section 4(4) of the act was repealed by section 1(1) of, and part XIX of schedule 1 to, the Statute Law (Repeals) Act 1976, which came into force on 27 May 1976.

The whole act was repealed by section 30 of, and part II of the schedule to, the Forgery and Counterfeiting Act 1981, which came into force on 27 October 1981.

== See also ==
- Coinage Offences Act

== Bibliography ==
- Halsbury's Statutes. Third Edition. Volume 8. Page 317 et seq.
- The Law Commission. Criminal Law: Report on Forgery and Counterfeit Currency. Law Com 55. 1973. Paragraphs 78 to 118, at pages 32 to 45.
