= Empire Settlement Act 1922 =

Act of the Parliament of the United Kingdom

Empire Settlement Act 1922 (Note: Section 3.)
- Act of Parliament
- Parliament of the United Kingdom
- Long title: An Act to make better provision for furthering British settlement in His Majesty's Oversea Dominions.
- Citation: 12 & 13 Geo. 5. c. 13
- Territorial extent: United Kingdom

Dates
- Royal assent: 31 May 1922
- Commencement: 31 May 1922 (Note: The Acts of Parliament (Commencement) Act 1793.)
- Repealed: 27 May 1976
Other legislation
Amended by	Empire Settlement Act 1937
Repealed by	Statute Law (Repeals) Act 1976

Status: Repealed

Text of statute as originally enacted

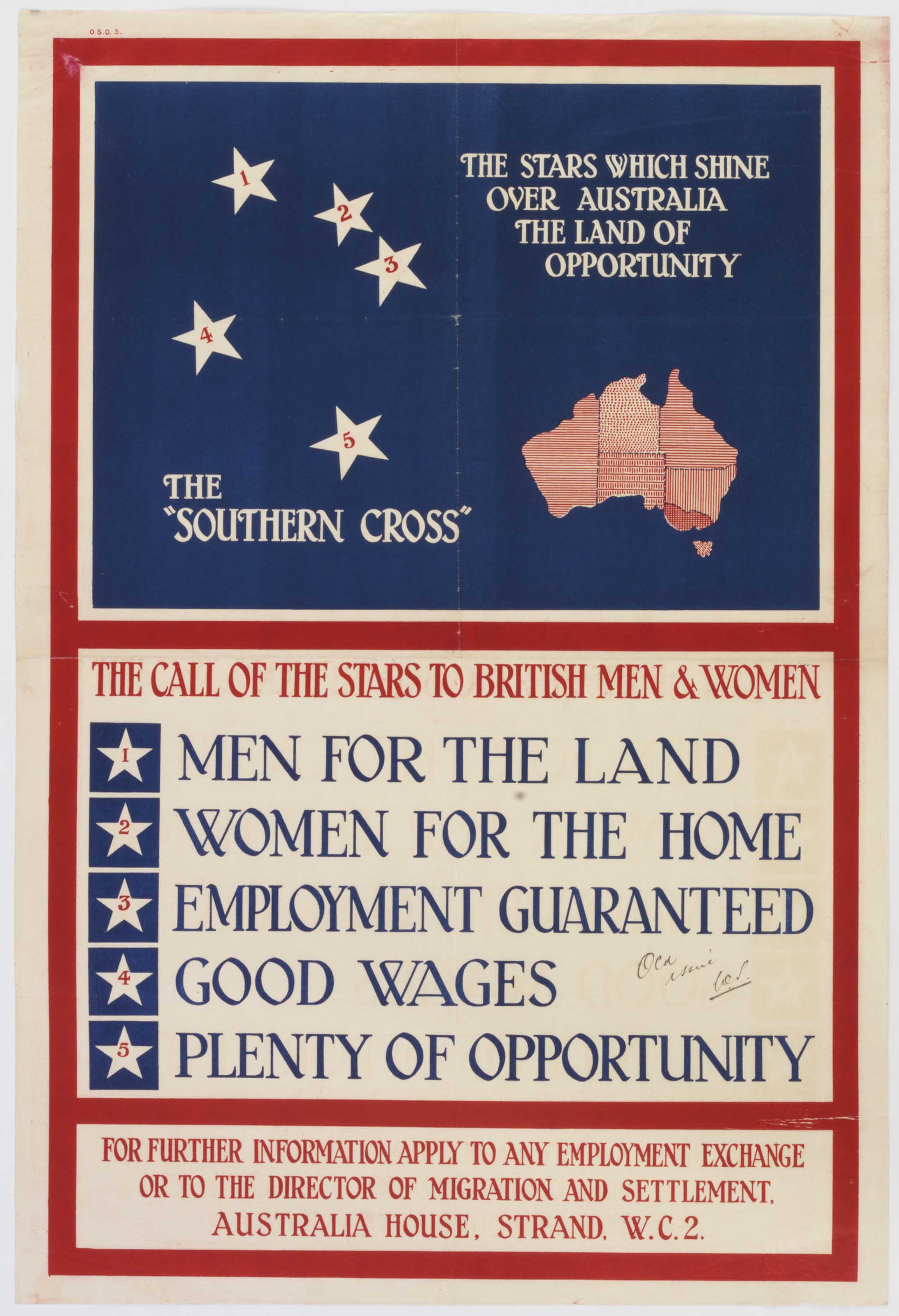
Australian poster from 1928 encouraging British immigration

The Empire Settlement Act 1922 (12 & 13 Geo. 5. c. 13) was an act of the Parliament of the United Kingdom passed to encourage British settlement in its then colonies. Different groups were encouraged to settle including farm labourers and domestic workers. Training was offered as well as help with the cost of transport.

In 1918 the British Government founded the Government Emigration Committee (later renamed to the Overseas Settlement Committee) to encourage former servicemen to emigrate from the UK to the colonies. The idea, as quoted in Parliament in 1952 was:

"That the migration of population from the United Kingdom to other parts of the Empire was calculated to promote the economic strength and the well-being of the Empire as a whole, and of the United Kingdom in particular, provided that the flow at any time was not in excess of what the industries of the United Kingdom could afford to spare or in excess of what the Dominions could conveniently absorb."

This was further stated by the Imperial Economic Conference of 1923:

"The Conference is of opinion that the problem of oversea settlement, which is that of a re-distribution of the white population of the Empire in the best interests of the whole British Commonwealth, is one of paramount importance, especially as between Great Britain on the one hand and Canada, Australia and New Zealand on the other. "

The act was extended in 1937, (Note: Empire Settlement Act 1937 (1 Edw. 8 & 1 Geo. 6. c. 18)) and again in 1952, (Note: Empire Settlement Act 1952 (15 & 16 Geo. 6 & 1 Eliz. 2. c. 26)) 1957, (Note: Commonwealth Settlement Act 1957 (5 & 6 Eliz. 2. c. 8)) 1962 (Note: Commonwealth Settlement Act 1962 (10 & 11 Eliz. 2. c. 17)) and 1967. (Note: Commonwealth Settlement Act 1967 (c. 31))

== Subsequent developments ==
The whole act was repealed by section 1(1) of, and part XI of schedule 1 to, the Statute Law (Repeals) Act 1976, which came into force on 27 May 1976.

== See also ==
- Home Children
- Ten Pound Poms
