= Statute Law (Repeals) Act 1976 =

Act of the Parliament of the United Kingdom

Statute Law (Repeals) Act 1976 (Note: Section 4.)
- Act of Parliament
- Parliament of the United Kingdom
- Long title: An Act to promote the reform of the statute law by the repeal, in accordance with recommendations of the Law Commission and the Scottish Law Commission, of certain enactments which (except in so far as their effect is preserved) are no longer of practical utility, and to make other provision in connection with the repeal of those enactments.
- Citation: 1976 c. 16
- Introduced by: Lord Elwyn-Jones LC (Lords)
- Territorial extent: United Kingdom; British Colonies (Note: Section 3(2). The Statute Law (Repeals) Act 1976 (Colonies) Order 1979 (SI 1979/111).); Isle of Man (Note: Section 3(2). The Statute Law Repeals (Isle of Man) Order 1984 (SI 1984/1692)); (Note: Section 3.)

Dates
- Royal assent: 27 May 1976
- Commencement: 27 May 1976 (Note: The Acts of Parliament (Commencement) Act 1793.)
Other legislation
Amends	Inebriates Act 1898; Licensing Act 1902; Licensing (Scotland) Act 1903; Civil Defence Act 1939; Enemy Property Act 1953; Miscellaneous Financial Provisions Act 1955; Protection of Birds Act 1967; See § Repealed enactments
Repeals/revokes	See § Repealed enactments
Amended by	Statute Law (Repeals) Act 1977; Statute Law (Repeals) Act 1978; Wildlife and Countryside Act 1981; Statute Law (Repeals) Act 1998; Civil Contingencies Act 2004
Relates to	See Statute Law (Repeals) Act

Status: Amended

Text of statute as originally enacted

Revised text of statute as amended

Text of the Statute Law (Repeals) Act 1976 as in force today (including any amendments) within the United Kingdom, from legislation.gov.uk.

The Statute Law (Repeals) Act 1976 (c. 16) is an act of the Parliament of the United Kingdom.

As of 2026, the act remains partly in the United Kingdom.

== Background ==
The act implemented recommendations contained in the seventh report on statute law revision, by the Law Commission and the Scottish Law Commission.

== Provisions ==
The power conferred by section 3(2) of the act was exercised by

- The Statute Law (Repeals) Act 1976 (Colonies) Order 1979 (SI 1979/111)
- The Statute Law Repeals (Isle of Man) Order 1984 (SI 1984/1692)

=== Repealed enactments ===
Section 1(1) of the act repealed 304 enactments, listed in schedule 1 to the act.

==== Part I: Administration of Justice ====
Part I — Administration of Justice
Citation	Short title	Extent of repeal
57 Geo. 3. c. 93	Distress (Costs) Act 1817	Section 7.
3 & 4 Will. 4. c. 74	Fines and Recoveries Act 1833	In section 67, including that section as applied by any other Act, the words from "and in case any action of trespass" to "special matter in evidence".
6 & 7 Will. 4. c. 19	Durham (County Palatine) Act 1836	The whole act.
33 & 34 Vict. c. 30	Wages Attachment Abolition Act 1870	The whole act.
36 & 37 Vict. c. 81	Langbaurgh Coroners Act 1873	The whole act.
36 & 37 Vict. c. 88	Slave Trade Act 1873	In section 18, the words from "or given" onwards.
45 & 46 Vict. c. 31	Inferior Courts Judgments Extension Act 1882	In section 2, in the definition of "inferior courts" the words "and the Court of Bankruptcy".
4 & 5 Geo. 5. c. 78	Courts (Emergency Powers) Act 1914	The whole act.
6 & 7 Geo. 5. c. 13	Courts (Emergency Powers) (Amendment) Act 1916	The whole act.
6 & 7 Geo. 5. c. 18	Courts (Emergency Powers) (No. 2) Act 1916	The whole act.
18 & 19 Geo. 5. c. 26	Administration of Justice Act 1928	In section 20(5), the words from "A copy of" onwards.
18 & 19 Geo. 5. c. 26	Administration of Justice Act 1928	In Schedule 1, in Part I the amendments of sections 118 and 167 of the Supreme Court of Judicature (Consolidation) Act 1925.
22 & 23 Geo. 5. c. 2	Expiring Laws Act 1931	The whole act.
7 & 8 Geo. 6. c. 7	Prize Salvage Act 1944	Section 1(2).
12, 13 & 14 Geo. 6. c. 63	Legal Aid and Solicitors (Scotland) Act 1949	In Schedule 7, in the third column the entries relating to sections 9 and 26 to 28 of the Solicitors (Scotland) Act 1933.
2 & 3 Eliz. 2. c. 36	Law Reform (Limitation of Actions, &c.) Act 1954	Sections 5 and 7.
2 & 3 Eliz. 2. c. 36	Law Reform (Limitation of Actions, &c.) Act 1954	Section 8(2) except the words "this Act extends to Great Britain only".
7 & 8 Eliz. 2. c. 65	Fatal Accidents Act 1959	Section 3(5) except the words "this Act does not extend to Scotland or Northern Ireland".
1965 c. 72	Matrimonial Causes Act 1965	Section 38.

==== Part II: Alcoholism ====
Part II — Alcoholism
Citation	Short title	Extent of repeal
42 & 43 Vict. c. 19	Habitual Drunkards Act 1879	The whole act.
51 & 52 Vict. c. 19	Inebriates Act 1888	The whole act.
61 & 62 Vict. c. 60	Inebriates Act 1898	The whole Act except section 30 and Schedule 1.
61 & 62 Vict. c. 60	Inebriates Act 1898	In Schedule 1, the entries relating to the Refreshment Houses (Ireland) Act 1860, the Dublin Police Act 1842 and the Licensing (Ireland) Act 1836.
62 & 63 Vict. c. 35	Inebriates Act 1899	The whole act.
63 & 64 Vict. c. 28	Inebriates Amendment (Scotland) Act 1900	The whole act.
2 Edw. 7. c. 28	Licensing Act 1902	In section 2, in subsection (1) the words "with or without hard labour" and, in subsection (3), the words "and in section sixty of the Licensing Act 1872".
2 Edw. 7. c. 28	Licensing Act 1902	Section 3.
12, 13 & 14 Geo. 6. c. 47	Finance Act 1949	In Schedule 8, paragraph 4 of Part II.
7 & 8 Eliz. 2. c. 72	Mental Health Act 1959	In Schedule 7, the entry relating to the Habitual Drunkards Act 1879.
8 & 9 Eliz. 2. c. 61	Mental Health (Scotland) Act 1960	In Schedule 4, the entry relating to the Habitual Drunkards Act 1879.

==== Part III: Animals ====
Part III — Animals
Citation	Short title	Extent of repeal
6 Edw. 7. c. 32	Dogs Act 1906	Sections 8(c) and 9(a).
1 & 2 Geo. 5. c. 27	Protection of Animals Act 1911	Section 17.
6 & 7 Eliz. 2. c. 43	Horse Breeding Act 1958	Section 17(1), (6) and (7).
1963 c. 11	Agriculture (Miscellaneous Provisions) Act 1963	Section 15.
1963 c. 43	Animal Boarding Establishments Act 1963	Sections 6 and 7(2).
1964 c. 70	Riding Establishments Act 1964	Sections 7 and 8.
1967 c. 46	Protection of Birds Act 1967	Sections 1 and 2.
1967 c. 46	Protection of Birds Act 1967	In section 3, subsection (1), in subsection (2) the word "Accordingly", and subsection (3).
1967 c. 46	Protection of Birds Act 1967	In section 12(3), the words from "so much" to "principal Act".
1973 c. 57	Badgers Act 1973	In section 11, in the definition of "local authority" paragraph (a), and in paragraph (b) the words "on and after 1st April 1974".

==== Part IV: Armed Forces ====
Part IV — Armed Forces
Citation	Short title	Extent of repeal
53 Geo. 3. c. 154	Kilmainham Hospital (Pensions Commutation) Act 1813	The whole act.
7 Geo. 4. c. 16	Chelsea and Kilmainham Hospitals Act 1826	Sections 4, 6, 7, 8 and 9.
7 Geo. 4. c. 16	Chelsea and Kilmainham Hospitals Act 1826	In section 10, the words "or Kilmainham".
7 Geo. 4. c. 16	Chelsea and Kilmainham Hospitals Act 1826	Section 12.
7 Geo. 4. c. 16	Chelsea and Kilmainham Hospitals Act 1826	In section 13, the words "or through the commissioners or governors of Kilmainham Hospital".
7 Geo. 4. c. 16	Chelsea and Kilmainham Hospitals Act 1826	Section 22.
7 Geo. 4. c. 16	Chelsea and Kilmainham Hospitals Act 1826	In section 24, the words "or Kilmainham" and the words, wherever occurring, "of either of the said hospitals", "into either of the said hospitals", and "either of the said hospitals".
7 Geo. 4. c. 16	Chelsea and Kilmainham Hospitals Act 1826	Section 26.
7 Geo. 4. c. 16	Chelsea and Kilmainham Hospitals Act 1826	In section 27, the words "either" and "or Kilmainham".
7 Geo. 4. c. 16	Chelsea and Kilmainham Hospitals Act 1826	Section 33.
11 Geo. 4 & 1 Will. 4. c. 41	Army Pensions Act 1830	The whole act.
2 & 3 Vict. c. 51	Pensions Act 1839	The whole act.
10 & 11 Vict. c. 4	Chelsea Pensions (Abolition of Poundage) Act 1847	The whole act.
28 & 29 Vict. c. 73	Naval and Marine Pay and Pensions Act 1865	In section 4, the words "or by a person entitled to any marine half pay," and the words "or half pay".
28 & 29 Vict. c. 73	Naval and Marine Pay and Pensions Act 1865	Section 7.
28 & 29 Vict. c. 89	Greenwich Hospital Act 1865	In section 5, the words "half pay".
28 & 29 Vict. c. 89	Greenwich Hospital Act 1865	Section 8.
47 & 48 Vict. c. 44	Naval Pensions Act 1884	Section 3.
47 & 48 Vict. c. 55	Pensions and Yeomanry Pay Act 1884	In the title, the words "and to the pay and pensions of the Yeomanry".
47 & 48 Vict. c. 55	Pensions and Yeomanry Pay Act 1884	In section 2(1), the words "and to the pay and pensions of the Yeomanry"; and the words from "both such pay" onwards except the word "pensions".
47 & 48 Vict. c. 55	Pensions and Yeomanry Pay Act 1884	Section 6.
61 & 62 Vict. c. 24	Greenwich Hospital Act 1898	The whole Act except section 1 as that section applies to Northern Ireland.
4 & 5 Geo. 5. c. 83	Army Pensions Act 1914	In section 1, the words in the proviso from "this section" to "and that".
7 & 8 Geo. 5. c. 51	Air Force (Constitution) Act 1917	Section 6(2).
14 & 15 Geo. 5. c. 15	Auxiliary Air Force and Air Force Reserve Act 1924	The whole act.
24 & 25 Geo. 5. c. 5	Air Force Reserve (Pilots and Observers) Act 1934	The whole act.
12, 13 & 14 Geo. 6. c. 96	Auxiliary and Reserve Forces Act 1949	Section 7.
12, 13 & 14 Geo. 6. c. 96	Auxiliary and Reserve Forces Act 1949	In section 8, the words "or as part of the short title of the Auxiliary Air Force and Air Force Reserve Act 1924".
12, 13 & 14 Geo. 6. c. 96	Auxiliary and Reserve Forces Act 1949	Sections 14, 15 and 16(1).
14 Geo. 6. c. 33	Air Force Reserve Act 1950	Section 29.
14 & 15 Geo. 6. c. 23	Reserve and Auxiliary Forces (Training) Act 1951	The whole act.
1 & 2 Eliz. 2. c. 50	Auxiliary Forces Act 1953	Sections 45 and 46(6).
2 & 3 Eliz. 2. c. 10	Navy, Army and Air Force Reserves Act 1954	The whole act.
1966 c. 30	Reserve Forces Act 1966	In Schedule 1, paragraph 31.
1969 c. 23	Army Reserve Act 1969	The whole act.

==== Part V: Civil Defence ====
Part V — Civil Defence
Citation	Short title	Extent of repeal
1 & 2 Geo. 6. c. 6	Air-Raid Precautions Act 1937	The whole act.
2 & 3 Geo. 6. c. 31	Civil Defence Act 1939	Parts I to IV.
2 & 3 Geo. 6. c. 31	Civil Defence Act 1939	Part V except sections 36, 37 and 39.
2 & 3 Geo. 6. c. 31	Civil Defence Act 1939	In section 36(2), the proviso.
2 & 3 Geo. 6. c. 31	Civil Defence Act 1939	Part VI.
2 & 3 Geo. 6. c. 31	Civil Defence Act 1939	Part VIII except section 62.
2 & 3 Geo. 6. c. 31	Civil Defence Act 1939	In section 62, in subsection (1)(b) the words "(as defined in the Act of 1937)", and subsection (5).
2 & 3 Geo. 6. c. 31	Civil Defence Act 1939	Sections 74, 75, 81 and 82.
2 & 3 Geo. 6. c. 31	Civil Defence Act 1939	In section 83, subsection (1), the proviso to subsection (4), and subsection (5).
2 & 3 Geo. 6. c. 31	Civil Defence Act 1939	Sections 85 to 89.
2 & 3 Geo. 6. c. 31	Civil Defence Act 1939	In section 90(1), the definition of "Annual value", in the definition of "Civil defence functions" the words "the Act of 1937 or", and the definitions of "Diminution in the annual value", "Electricity undertakers", "Fire authority", "Lease", "Owner", and "Public air-raid shelter".
2 & 3 Geo. 6. c. 31	Civil Defence Act 1939	Section 91 except subsections (20), (21), (28) and (34).
2 & 3 Geo. 6. c. 31	Civil Defence Act 1939	In section 91(20), the words from the beginning to "sixty-eight and".
2 & 3 Geo. 6. c. 31	Civil Defence Act 1939	In section 91(21), the words "and to section five of the Act of 1937", the word "respectively", and the words from "and to subsection (9)" onwards.
2 & 3 Geo. 6. c. 31	Civil Defence Act 1939	In section 91(34), the words "of the Act of 1937 or". Schedule 2.
9 & 10 Geo. 6. c. 12	Civil Defence (Suspension of Powers) Act 1945	The whole act.
9 & 10 Geo. 6. c. 49	Acquisition of Land (Authorisation Procedure) Act 1946	In Schedule 4, the entries relating to the Air-Raid Precautions Act 1937 and the Civil Defence Act 1939.
9 & 10 Eliz. 2. c. 64	Public Health Act 1961	In Part III of Schedule 1, the entry relating to the Civil Defence Act 1939.
1963 c. 33	London Government Act 1963	In section 49, in subsection (1) the words "of the Civil Defence Acts 1937 and 1939 or" and the words "in the said Acts of 1937 and 1939 and", and subsections (5) and (6).
1967 c. 76	Road Traffic Regulation Act 1967	In Schedule 6, the entry relating to the Civil Defence Act 1939.
1969 c. 48	Post Office Act 1969	In Schedule 4, in paragraph 36(1), the words from "other than" onwards.
1970 c. 38	Building (Scotland) Act 1970	In Part II of Schedule 1, paragraph 3.
1973 c. 65	Local Government (Scotland) Act 1973	In Schedule 27, the entries relating to the Air-Raid Precautions Act 1937 and the Civil Defence Act 1939.

==== Part VI: Customs and Excise ====
Part VI — Customs and Excise
Citation	Short title	Extent of repeal
23 & 24 Vict. c. 90	Game Licences Act 1860	In section 16, the words "and Dublin".
23 & 24 Vict. c. 90	Game Licences Act 1860	Sections 17 and 18.
13 & 14 Geo. 5. c. 14	Finance Act 1923	In section 39(1) the words from "so far as", where first occurring, to "excise", where first occurring.
14 & 15 Geo. 5. c. 21	Finance Act 1924	In section 17, in subsection (1) the words "or a gun licence", the word "respectively" in both places, the words "and gun licences" in both places and the words "or licence", in subsection (2) the words "and gun licences", and in subsection (3) the words from "and the expression 'gun licence'" onwards.
18 & 19 Geo. 5. c. 17	Finance Act 1928	In section 35(1), the words from "and the expression" onwards.
15 & 16 Geo. 6 & 1 Eliz. 2. c. 44	Customs and Excise Act 1952	In section 237(2), the words from "and to licences" onwards.
1963 c. 25	Finance Act 1963	Section 2.
1970 c. 24	Finance Act 1970	In section 2(9), the words from "for" onwards.

==== Part VII: India ====
Part VII — India
Citation	Short title	Extent of repeal
6 & 7 Vict. c. 98	Slave Trade Act 1843	Section 4(2).
28 & 29 Vict. c. 63	Colonial Laws Validity Act 1865	In section 1, the words "British India".
31 & 32 Vict. c. 37	Documentary Evidence Act 1868	Section 5(2).
33 & 34 Vict. c. 52	Extradition Act 1870	Section 23.
33 & 34 Vict. c. 90	Foreign Enlistment Act 1870	In section 30, the words "as respects India, mean the Governor General and".
36 & 37 Vict. c. 88	Slave Trade Act 1873	In section 2, in the definition of "governor", the proviso.
37 & 38 Vict. c. 27	Courts (Colonial) Jurisdiction Act 1874	In section 2, the words "British India".
37 & 38 Vict. c. 27	Courts (Colonial) Jurisdiction Act 1874	Section 2A.
40 & 41 Vict. c. 59	Colonial Stock Act 1877	In section 26, the words "and not forming part of British India".
41 & 42 Vict. c. 73	Territorial Waters Jurisdiction Act 1878	In section 7, the words "as respects India, means the Governor General and".
47 & 48 Vict. c. 31	Colonial Prisoners Removal Act 1884	Section 14A.
47 & 48 Vict. c. 31	Colonial Prisoners Removal Act 1884	In section 18, the words "and subject, as respects India, to the provisions of section fourteen A of this Act", and in the definition of "British possession", the words "which are not part of India".
48 & 49 Vict. c. 25	East India Unclaimed Stock Act 1885	In section 2, the definitions of "Government director" and "Indian railway company".
48 & 49 Vict. c. 25	East India Unclaimed Stock Act 1885	Sections 17 to 24.
53 & 54 Vict. c. 27	Colonial Courts of Admiralty Act 1890	In section 4, the words "This section shall not apply to Indian laws".
57 & 58 Vict. c. 60	Merchant Shipping Act 1894	Section 368.
8 Edw. 7. c. 51	Appellate Jurisdiction Act 1908	Section 2.
5 & 6 Geo. 5. c. 57	Prize Courts Act 1915	In section 4(1), the words from "as respects any prize court in India" to "its principal seat or".
9 & 10 Geo. 5. c. 101	Government of India Act 1919	The whole Act, so far as unrepealed by the Government of India Act 1935.
10 & 11 Geo. 5. c. 75	Official Secrets Act 1920	In section 11(1)(a), the word "India".
11 & 12 Geo. 5. c. 58	Trusts (Scotland) Act 1921	In section 2, the definition of "East India Stock".
17 & 18 Geo. 5. c. 40	Indian Church Act 1927	The whole act.
19 & 20 Geo. 5. c. 8	Appellate Jurisdiction Act 1929	The whole act.
25 & 26 Geo. 5. c. 42	Government of India Act 1935	The whole act.
26 Geo. 5 & 1 Edw. 8. c. 1	Government of India (Reprinting) Act 1935	The whole act.
26 Geo. 5 & 1 Edw. 8. c. 2	Government of India Act 1935	The whole Act except sections 1 and 311(4) and (5).
1 Edw. 8 & 1 Geo. 6. c. 9	India and Burma (Existing Laws) Act 1937	The whole act.
2 & 3 Geo. 6. c. 66	Government of India Act (Amendment) Act 1939	The whole act.
3 & 4 Geo. 6. c. 5	India and Burma (Miscellaneous Amendments) Act 1940	The whole act.
3 & 4 Geo. 6. c. 33	India and Burma (Emergency Provisions) Act 1940	The whole act.
4 & 5 Geo. 6. c. 44	India and Burma (Postponement of Elections) Act 1941	The whole act.
5 & 6 Geo. 6. c. 7	India (Federal Court Judges) Act 1942	The whole act.
5 & 6 Geo. 6. c. 39	India and Burma (Temporary and Miscellaneous Provisions) Act 1942	The whole act.
7 & 8 Geo. 6. c. 14	India (Attachment of States) Act 1944	The whole act.
7 & 8 Geo. 6. c. 38	India (Miscellaneous Provisions) Act 1944	The whole act.
8 & 9 Geo. 6. c. 7	India (Estate Duty) Act 1945	The whole act.
9 & 10 Geo. 6. c. 2	Indian Franchise Act 1945	The whole act.
9 & 10 Geo. 6. c. 5	Indian Divorce Act 1945	The whole act.
9 & 10 Geo. 6. c. 23	India (Proclamations of Emergency) Act 1946	The whole act.
9 & 10 Geo. 6. c. 39	India (Central Government and Legislature) Act 1946	The whole act.
10 & 11 Geo. 6. c. 30	Indian Independence Act 1947	Sections 2 to 5.
10 & 11 Geo. 6. c. 30	Indian Independence Act 1947	Section 6(1) to (3) and (6).
10 & 11 Geo. 6. c. 30	Indian Independence Act 1947	Sections 8 to 12.
10 & 11 Geo. 6. c. 30	Indian Independence Act 1947	In section 14, in subsection (2), the words from "or as applying" onwards; and subsections (3) and (4).
10 & 11 Geo. 6. c. 30	Indian Independence Act 1947	In section 15(3), the words from "and any legal proceedings" onwards.
10 & 11 Geo. 6. c. 30	Indian Independence Act 1947	Section 16.
10 & 11 Geo. 6. c. 30	Indian Independence Act 1947	Section 18(3) to (5).
10 & 11 Geo. 6. c. 30	Indian Independence Act 1947	Section 19.
10 & 11 Geo. 6. c. 30	Indian Independence Act 1947	Schedules 1 and 2.
12, 13 & 14 Geo. 6. c. 92	India (Consequential Provision) Act 1949	In section 1(1), the words "and subject to the provisions of subsection (3) of this section".
12, 13 & 14 Geo. 6. c. 92	India (Consequential Provision) Act 1949	Section 1(3) and (4).
Church Assembly Measure
17 & 18 Geo. 5. No. 1	Indian Church Measure 1927	The whole measure.

==== Part VIII: Local Government ====
Part VIII — Local Government
Citation	Short title	Description	Extent of repeal
33 Geo. 3. c. 124	Glasgow Improvement Act 1793	An Act for rebuilding the Tron Church of the City of Glasgow; for opening certain streets, for removing obstructions in Trongate Street; for building a bridge over the River Clyde, opposite the Salt Market Street; for regulating the weight and measure of coals and the mode of carrying wood and timber in the streets of the said city; for enlarging the gaol or tolbooth there; and for selling part of the High or Calton Green, and also the Glebe belonging to the Inner High Church and Parish of Glasgow.	The whole act.
6 & 7 Will. 4. c. 87	Liberties Act 1836	Liberties Act 1836.	The whole act.
20 & 21 Vict. c. 63	Dunbar Harbour Loan Act 1857	Dunbar Harbour Loan Act 1857.	The whole act.
34 & 35 Vict. c. 68	Glasgow Boundaries Act 1871	An Act to determine the boundaries of the Barony and Regality of Glasgow for the purposes of registration.	The whole act.
45 & 46 Vict. c. 50	Municipal Corporations Act 1882	Municipal Corporations Act 1882.	Sections 193, 225, 228, 229, 232 and 245.
52 & 53 Vict. c. 50	Local Government (Scotland) Act 1889	Local Government (Scotland) Act 1889.	The whole act.
56 & 57 Vict. c. 73	Local Government Act 1894	Local Government Act 1894.	Section 25(7).
8 Edw. 7. c. 62	Local Government (Scotland) Act 1908	Local Government (Scotland) Act 1908.	Sections 29 to 31.
19 & 20 Geo. 5. c. 17	Local Government Act 1929	Local Government Act 1929.	Sections 57(4), 85 and 127. In section 134, the definition of "Classified road".
10 & 11 Geo. 6. c. 43	Local Government (Scotland) Act 1947	Local Government (Scotland) Act 1947.	Section 377(6).
10 & 11 Geo. 6. c. 43	Local Government (Scotland) Act 1947	Local Government (Scotland) Act 1947.	In section 379(1), the definitions of "alteration of area", "classified road", "delegate", "ecclesiastical charity", "educational endowment", "educational establishment", "General Board of Control", "grant-aided school", "grants under Part III of the Local Government (Scotland) Act, 1929", "gross annual valuation", "landward area", "large burgh", "local government elector" or "elector", "magistrates", "property", "public body", "Public Health Acts", "refer", "Registration of Births, Deaths and Marriages Acts", "Roads and Bridges Acts", "senior bailie", "small burgh" and "statutory undertakers".
11 & 12 Geo. 6. c. 26	Local Government Act 1948	Local Government Act 1948.	Section 68.
1 & 2 Eliz. 2. c. 26	Local Government (Miscellaneous Provisions) Act 1953	Local Government (Miscellaneous Provisions) Act 1953.	Sections 15 to 17.
1 & 2 Eliz. 2. c. 26	Local Government (Miscellaneous Provisions) Act 1953	Local Government (Miscellaneous Provisions) Act 1953.	Section 19(3) from the beginning to the words "as aforesaid".
2 & 3 Eliz. 2. c. 13	Local Government (Financial Provisions) (Scotland) Act 1954	Local Government (Financial Provisions) (Scotland) Act 1954.	The whole act.
4 & 5 Eliz. 2. c. 36	Local Authorities (Expenses) Act 1956	Local Authorities (Expenses) Act 1956.	The whole act.
6 & 7 Eliz. 2. c. 64	Local Government and Miscellaneous Financial Provisions (Scotland) Act 1958	Local Government and Miscellaneous Financial Provisions (Scotland) Act 1958.	In section 21(1), the definitions of the expressions "Act of 1954" and "relevant expenditure".
6 & 7 Eliz. 2. c. 64	Local Government and Miscellaneous Financial Provisions (Scotland) Act 1958	Local Government and Miscellaneous Financial Provisions (Scotland) Act 1958.	In Schedule 4, paragraphs 10 and 11.
6 & 7 Eliz. 2. c. 64	Local Government and Miscellaneous Financial Provisions (Scotland) Act 1958	Local Government and Miscellaneous Financial Provisions (Scotland) Act 1958.	Schedule 5.
7 & 8 Eliz. 2. c. 62	New Towns Act 1959	New Towns Act 1959.	Sections 9(1) and 10.
9 & 10 Eliz. 2. c. 43	Public Authorities (Allowances) Act 1961	Public Authorities (Allowances) Act 1961.	The whole act.
10 & 11 Eliz. 2. c. 36	Local Authorities (Historic Buildings) Act 1962	Local Authorities (Historic Buildings) Act 1962.	Section 3.
1963 c. 46	Local Government (Financial Provisions) Act 1963	Local Government (Financial Provisions) Act 1963.	In section 5, the words "including an enactment contained in this Act".
1963 c. 46	Local Government (Financial Provisions) Act 1963	Local Government (Financial Provisions) Act 1963.	Section 13.
1963 c. 46	Local Government (Financial Provisions) Act 1963	Local Government (Financial Provisions) Act 1963.	In section 14(1), the words from "(except sections" to "thereof)" and the words "(except as aforesaid)".
1963 c. 46	Local Government (Financial Provisions) Act 1963	Local Government (Financial Provisions) Act 1963.	In section 15(1), the definition of "the Act of 1948".
1965 c. 27	Lost Property (Scotland) Act 1965	Lost Property (Scotland) Act 1965.	The whole Act as from 1st January 1980.
1966 c. 42	Local Government Act 1966	Local Government Act 1966.	In Schedule 5, paragraphs 4 and 8.
1966 c. 51	Local Government (Scotland) Act 1966	Local Government (Scotland) Act 1966.	Section 1.
1967 c. 18	Local Government (Termination of Reviews) Act 1967	Local Government (Termination of Reviews) Act 1967.	The whole act.

==== Part IX: London ====
Part IX — London
Citation	Short title	Description	Extent of repeal
7 Geo. 3. c. 23	Coal Metage, etc., London Act 1766	An Act to prevent frauds and abuses in the admeasurement of coals, sold by wharf measure, within the City of London, and the liberties thereof; and between Tower Dock and Lime-house Hole in the county of Middlesex.	The whole act.
10 Geo. 3. c. 53	Thames Coalheavers Act 1770	An Act to repeal an Act passed in the 31st year of the reign of His late Majesty King George the Second, intituled, An Act for the relief of coal-heavers working upon the River Thames; and for enabling them to make provision for such of themselves as shall be sick, lame or past their labour, and for their widows and orphans; and to regulate the price of their labour; to prevent fraud and impositions on such labourers; and for their further relief.	The whole act.
17 Geo. 3. c. 13	Coal Measurement, London Act 1776	An Act for continuing for a limited time [the Act 7 Geo. 3. c. 23].	The whole act.
26 Geo. 3. c. 83	Coal Trade (London) Act 1786	An Act to explain and amend [the Act 7 Geo. 3. c. 23].	The whole act.
29 & 30 Vict. c. 31	Superannuation (Metropolis) Act 1866	Superannuation (Metropolis) Act 1866.	The whole act.
41 & 42 Vict. c. 14	Baths and Washhouses Act 1878	Baths and Washhouses Act 1878.	The whole act.
52 & 53 Vict. c. 17	London Coal Duties Abolition Act 1889	London Coal Duties Abolition Act 1889.	The whole act.
2 Edw. 7. c. 41	Metropolis Water Act 1902	Metropolis Water Act 1902.	Section 24(4).
2 Edw. 7. c. 41	Metropolis Water Act 1902	Metropolis Water Act 1902.	In section 47(8), the words from "or of any" to "by this Act,".
25 & 26 Geo. 5. c. lxxxiv	Metropolitan Water Board Act 1935	Metropolitan Water Board Act 1935.	In section 66, in subsection (1) the definition of "the Act of 1866", in subsection (2)(a) the words "Notwithstanding anything contained in the Act of 1866 as applied to the Board by the Act of 1902", and in subsection (4) the words "in the Act of 1866 as applied to the Board by the Act of 1902 or".
1963 c. 33	London Government Act 1963	London Government Act 1963.	Sections 64, 65, 78(4) and (5).
1963 c. 33	London Government Act 1963	London Government Act 1963.	In section 89(1), the definition of "county review area".
1970 c. 57	Town and Country Planning Regulations (London) (Indemnity) Act 1970	Town and Country Planning Regulations (London) (Indemnity) Act 1970.	The whole act.

==== Part X: Medicine ====
Part X — Medicine
Citation	Short title	Extent of repeal
55 Geo. 3. c. 194	Apothecaries Act 1815	Section 5.
55 Geo. 3. c. 194	Apothecaries Act 1815	In section 8, the words "or by the five apothecaries hereinafter mentioned, or the major part of them present".
55 Geo. 3. c. 194	Apothecaries Act 1815	In section 9, the words from "and such court", where secondly occurring, onwards.
55 Geo. 3. c. 194	Apothecaries Act 1815	In section 17, the words "or by five apothecaries so to be appointed as hereinafter is mentioned" and "or from the said five apothecaries".
55 Geo. 3. c. 194	Apothecaries Act 1815	Sections 18, 20 and 21.
55 Geo. 3. c. 194	Apothecaries Act 1815	In section 22, the words "or the said five apothecaries so to be appointed for any county or counties as aforesaid" and "or to and for the said five apothecaries in any county or counties as aforesaid".
55 Geo. 3. c. 194	Apothecaries Act 1815	Sections 25, 26 and 27.
2 & 3 Will. 4. c. 75	Anatomy Act 1832	In section 6, the words from "and an annual return" onwards.
37 & 38 Vict. c. 34	Apothecaries Act Amendment Act 1874	Section 5.
38 & 39 Vict. c. 43	Medical Act (Royal College of Surgeons of England) 1875	In section 1, the first proviso and in the second proviso the word "also".
38 & 39 Vict. c. 43	Medical Act (Royal College of Surgeons of England) 1875	Section 2.
39 & 40 Vict. c. 41	Medical Act 1876	The whole act.
49 & 50 Vict. c. 48	Medical Act 1886	Section 25.
14 & 15 Geo. 6. c. 39	Common Informers Act 1951	In the Schedule, the entry relating to the Apothecaries Act 1815.

==== Part XI: Money ====
Part XI — Money
Citation	Short title	Extent of repeal
5 & 6 Will. & Mar. c. 20	Bank of England Act 1694	Section 28.
9 Geo. 4. c. 24	Bills of Exchange (Ireland) Act 1828	Sections 15 and 16.
17 & 18 Vict. c. 90	Usury Laws Repeal Act 1854	The whole act.
36 & 37 Vict. c. 57	Consolidated Fund (Permanent Charges Redemption) Act 1873	In section 7, in the definition of "limited owner", the words "a married woman entitled in her own right".
9 & 10 Geo. 6. c. 27	Bank of England Act 1946	In section 5(b), the words from "not being" onwards.
9 & 10 Geo. 6. c. 27	Bank of England Act 1946	In Schedule 2, the proviso to paragraph 2, and paragraph 7.
4 & 5 Eliz. 2. c. 6	Miscellaneous Financial Provisions Act 1955	Section 1(2).
1964 c. 9	Public Works Loans Act 1964	Section 8.
1969 c. 43	Air Corporations Act 1969	In section 1(1), paragraph (a). In Schedule 1, Part I.

==== Part XII: Obsolete Councils in England and Wales ====
Part XII — Obsolete Councils in England and Wales
Citation	Short title	Extent of repeal
13 & 14 Geo. 5. c. 18	War Memorials (Local Authorities' Powers) Act 1923	In section 4, the words "county borough, metropolitan" and the words "or other borough, or of an urban".
1 Edw. 8 & 1 Geo. 6. c. 46	Physical Training and Recreation Act 1937	In section 9, the words "county borough, metropolitan" and the word "county" in the expression "county district".
1 Edw. 8 & 1 Geo. 6. c. 70	Agriculture Act 1937	In section 32, in the definition of "Local authority" the words "metropolitan" and "county borough" and the word "county" in the expression "county district".
2 & 3 Geo. 6. c. 73	Housing (Emergency Powers) Act 1939	In section 3(1A), the words "county boroughs and county" and "metropolitan".
4 & 5 Geo. 6. c. 41	Landlord and Tenant (War Damage) (Amendment) Act 1941	In section 1(10), in the definition of "local authority", the words "metropolitan" and "the council of a county borough" and the word "county" in the expression "county district".
5 & 6 Geo. 6. c. 9	Restoration of Pre-War Trade Practices Act 1942	In section 11(1), in the definition of "local authority", the words "county borough, county" and "metropolitan".
8 & 9 Geo. 6. c. 43	Requisitioned Land and War Works Act 1945	In section 59(1), in the definition of "local authority" the words "county borough, metropolitan" and the word "county" in the expression "county district".
12, 13 & 14 Geo. 6. c. 84	War Damaged Sites Act 1949	In section 17(1), in the definition of "local authority", the words "metropolitan borough, county" and the word "county" in the expression "county district".
1 & 2 Eliz. 2. c. 26	Local Government (Miscellaneous Provisions) Act 1953	In section 18(1), the words "county borough, metropolitan" and the word "county" in the expression "county district".
1 & 2 Eliz. 2. c. 37	Registration Service Act 1953	In section 21(2)(b), the word "metropolitan".
3 & 4 Eliz. 2. c. 18	Army Act 1955	In section 163, the words "county borough, county" and "metropolitan".
3 & 4 Eliz. 2. c. 19	Air Force Act 1955	In section 163, the words "county borough, county" and "metropolitan".
6 & 7 Eliz. 2. c. 34	Litter Act 1958	In section 1(2), the words "county borough, metropolitan", and the words "non-county borough, urban district, rural".
7 & 8 Eliz. 2. c. 53	Town and Country Planning Act 1959	In section 27, in subsection (3)(a) the words "county borough" and "metropolitan" and in subsection (3)(b) the word "county" in both places.
10 & 11 Eliz. 2. c. 36	Local Authorities (Historic Buildings) Act 1962	In section 1(4), the words "county borough, metropolitan" and the word "county" in the expression "county district".

==== Part XIII: Overseas Financial Aid ====
Part XIII — Overseas Financial Aid
Citation	Short title	Extent of repeal
12 & 13 Geo. 5. c. 13	Empire Settlement Act 1922	The whole act.
15 & 16 Geo. 5. c. 3	Irish Free State Land Purchase (Loan Guarantee) Act 1924	The whole act.
16 & 17 Geo. 5. c. 62	East Africa Loans Act 1926	The whole act.
20 & 21 Geo. 5. c. 5	Colonial Development Act 1929	Section 4.
21 & 22 Geo. 5. c. 21	East Africa Loans (Amendment) Act 1931	The whole act.
22 & 23 Geo. 5. c. 17	Tanganyika and British Honduras Loans Act 1932	The whole act.
1 Edw. 8 & 1 Geo. 6. c. 18	Empire Settlement Act 1937	The whole act.
5 & 6 Eliz. 2. c. 6	Ghana Independence Act 1957	Section 3.
5 & 6 Eliz. 2. c. 54	Tanganyika Agricultural Corporation Act 1957	The whole act.
5 & 6 Eliz. 2. c. 60	Federation of Malaya Independence Act 1957	Section 2(1)(c).
7 & 8 Eliz. 2. c. 71	Colonial Development and Welfare Act 1959	The whole act.
10 & 11 Eliz. 2. c. 1	Tanganyika Independence Act 1961	Section 4.
1963 c. 40	Commonwealth Development Act 1963	Section 2.
1963 c. 40	Commonwealth Development Act 1963	Section 3(3).
1963 c. 54	Kenya Independence Act 1963	Section 5.
1963 c. 55	Zanzibar Act 1963	In Schedule 1, paragraph 14.
1964 c. 65	Zambia Independence Act 1964	In Schedule 1, paragraph 12.
1965 c. 38	Overseas Development and Service Act 1965	Section 1.
1965 c. 38	Overseas Development and Service Act 1965	Section 3(2).
1966 c. 21	Overseas Aid Act 1966	Section 1(3) to (5).
1966 c. 21	Overseas Aid Act 1966	Section 5.
1966 c. 23	Botswana Independence Act 1966	In the Schedule, paragraph 11.
1966 c. 24	Lesotho Independence Act 1966	In the Schedule, in paragraph 12, the words "the Colonial Development and Welfare Act 1959".
1967 c. 31	Commonwealth Settlement Act 1967	The whole act.
1968 c. 13	National Loans Act 1968	In section 10(3), the words from "loans" to "or of".
1968 c. 56	Swaziland Independence Act 1968	In the Schedule, paragraphs.
1970 c. 22	Tonga Act 1970	In the Schedule, paragraph 10.
1975 c. 26	Ministers of the Crown Act 1975	In Schedule 2, the entries relating to the Colonial Development and Welfare Act 1959 and the Commonwealth Development Act 1963.

==== Part XIV: Overseas Territories ====
Part XIV — Overseas Territories
Citation	Short title	Extent of repeal
5 Geo. 3. c. 26	Isle of Man Purchase Act 1765	The whole act.
59 Geo. 3. c. 38	North American Fisheries Act 1819	The whole act.
6 & 7 Vict. c. 22	The (Colonies) Evidence Act 1843	The whole act.
16 & 17 Vict. c. 48	Coinage (Colonial Offences) Act 1853	The whole act.
35 & 36 Vict. c. 45	Treaty of Washington Act 1872	The whole act.
40 & 41 Vict. c. 23	Colonial Fortifications Act 1877	The whole act.
47 & 48 Vict. c. 31	Colonial Prisoners Removal Act 1884	Section 17.
4 Edw. 7. c. 33	Anglo-French Convention Act 1904	The whole act.
9 Edw. 7. c. 9	South Africa Act 1909	The whole act.
9 Edw. 7. c. 18	Naval Establishments in British Possessions Act 1909	The whole act.
11 & 12 Geo. 6. c. 27	Palestine Act 1948	In Schedule 2, paragraph 3.
14 & 15 Geo. 6. c. 39	Common Informers Act 1951	In the Schedule, the entry relating to the North American Fisheries Act 1819.
1 & 2 Eliz. 2. c. 30	Rhodesia and Nyasaland Federation Act 1953	The whole act.
3 & 4 Eliz. 2. c. 5	Cocos Islands Act 1955	The whole act.
6 & 7 Eliz. 2. c. 10	British Nationality Act 1958	Section 1.
6 & 7 Eliz. 2. c. 25	Christmas Island Act 1958	The whole act.
10 & 11 Eliz. 2. c. 23	South Africa Act 1962	In Schedule 3, paragraph 1.

==== Part XV: Property ====
Part XV — Property
Citation	Short title	Extent of repeal
17 & 18 Vict. c. 112	Literary and Scientific Institutions Act 1854	The following provisions as they apply to Great Britain— In section 1, the words "of and" where they first occur, the words "manor or" in both places, the words "of freehold, copyhold, or customary tenure" and the words "or enfranchise". In section 2, the words "or enfranchise" and "or enfranchised". In section 3, the words "or enfranchise". In section 5, the words "manor or". In section 6, the words "or enfranchise". In section 13, the words "[add if necessary, enfranchise]" and the words from "And no bargain and sale" onwards.
18 & 19 Vict. c. 117	Ordnance Board Transfer Act 1855	The following provisions as they apply to Great Britain— In section 2, including that section as applied by any other Act, the words from "nevertheless" onwards. In section 4, the words "feoffees or", the words from "tenants for life" to "curators", and the word "surrender".
20 & 21 Vict. c. 26	Registration of Long Leases (Scotland) Act 1857	In section 15, the words "and being subscribed by the keeper of the register".
23 & 24 Vict. c. 112	Defence Act 1860	The following provisions as they apply to Great Britain— In section 11, the words "feoffees or", the words from "tenants for life" to "committees, and", and the words from "femes covert" to "idiots, or".
28 & 29 Vict. c. 89	Greenwich Hospital Act 1865	Section 43, as it applies to Northern Ireland.
28 & 29 Vict. c. 89	Greenwich Hospital Act 1865	Section 45.
38 & 39 Vict. c. 25	Public Stores Act 1875	Section 17.
61 & 62 Vict. c. 24	Greenwich Hospital Act 1898	Section 1, as it applies to Northern Ireland.
15 & 16 Geo. 5. c. 33	Church of Scotland (Property and Endowments) Act 1925	Sections 3 to 6.
15 & 16 Geo. 5. c. 33	Church of Scotland (Property and Endowments) Act 1925	Section 10.
15 & 16 Geo. 5. c. 33	Church of Scotland (Property and Endowments) Act 1925	Schedules 3 and 4.
2 & 3 Eliz. 2. c. 56	Landlord and Tenant Act 1954	In Schedule 9, paragraphs 1, 2, 7, 9 and 10.
5 & 6 Eliz. 2. c. 61	Winfrith Heath Act 1957	The whole act.
1967 c. 88	Leasehold Reform Act 1967	Section 39(3).
1969 c. 62	Rent (Control of Increases) Act 1969	The whole act.

==== Part XVI: Road Traffic: Civic Amenities ====
Part XVI — Road Traffic: Civic Amenities
Citation	Short title	Extent of repeal
1967 c. 69	Civic Amenities Act 1967	Section 25.
1967 c. 76	Road Traffic Regulation Act 1967	In Schedule 6, the amendment of section 25 of the Civic Amenities Act 1967.
1968 c. 73	Transport Act 1968	In Schedule 14, in Part VI, paragraphs 14, 25 and 26.
1973 c. 65	Local Government (Scotland) Act 1973	In Schedule 14, paragraph 68.

==== Part XVII: Road Traffic: General ====
Part XVII — Road Traffic: General
Citation	Short title	Extent of repeal
1 & 2 Will. 4. c. 22	London Hackney Carriage Act 1831	In section 4, the proviso.
1 & 2 Will. 4. c. 22	London Hackney Carriage Act 1831	Section 18.
1 & 2 Will. 4. c. 22	London Hackney Carriage Act 1831	In section 27, the words from "and for want of sufficient distress" onwards.
1 & 2 Will. 4. c. 22	London Hackney Carriage Act 1831	In section 28, the words from "and for want of sufficient distress" to "justice shall direct".
1 & 2 Will. 4. c. 22	London Hackney Carriage Act 1831	In section 35, the words "and having thereon any of the numbered plates required by this Act to be fixed on hackney carriages".
1 & 2 Will. 4. c. 22	London Hackney Carriage Act 1831	In section 36, the words from "and in default" onwards.
1 & 2 Will. 4. c. 22	London Hackney Carriage Act 1831	In section 41, the words from "and upon the refusal" onwards.
1 & 2 Will. 4. c. 22	London Hackney Carriage Act 1831	In section 51, the words from "shall stand or ply" to "hackney carriage; or if any such proprietor or driver", and the words "or other person".
1 & 2 Will. 4. c. 22	London Hackney Carriage Act 1831	In section 56, the words from "and in default of payment" to "house of correction".
1 & 2 Will. 4. c. 22	London Hackney Carriage Act 1831	In section 57, the words from "and in default of payment" onwards.
1 & 2 Will. 4. c. 22	London Hackney Carriage Act 1831	Sections 62, 63, 68, 70 and 71.
6 & 7 Vict. c. 86	London Hackney Carriages Act 1843	In section 2, the definitions of "metropolitan stage carriage", "conductor", and "passenger"; and in the definition of "proprietor", the words "or any metropolitan stage carriage", wherever occurring.
6 & 7 Vict. c. 86	London Hackney Carriages Act 1843	Section 7.
6 & 7 Vict. c. 86	London Hackney Carriages Act 1843	In section 8, the words "or as driver or as conductor of metropolitan stage carriages (as the case may be)"; the words from "respectively" to "sixteen years of age"; and the words "or conductor" and "conductor", wherever occurring.
6 & 7 Vict. c. 86	London Hackney Carriages Act 1843	In section 10, the words from the beginning to "and also"; the words "or as driver or as conductor of any metropolitan stage carriage"; and the words "or conductor", wherever occurring.
6 & 7 Vict. c. 86	London Hackney Carriages Act 1843	Section 15.
6 & 7 Vict. c. 86	London Hackney Carriages Act 1843	In section 17, the word "conductor", wherever occurring.
6 & 7 Vict. c. 86	London Hackney Carriages Act 1843	In section 20, the words "or for the driver or the conductor of a metropolitan stage carriage"; and the words from "such imprisonment" to "as the court shall think fit".
6 & 7 Vict. c. 86	London Hackney Carriages Act 1843	In section 21, the words "and of every metropolitan stage carriage"; the words "or of a metropolitan stage carriage"; and the words "or conductor", wherever occurring.
6 & 7 Vict. c. 86	London Hackney Carriages Act 1843	In section 22, the words "or metropolitan stage carriage"; and the words "or conductor", wherever occurring.
6 & 7 Vict. c. 86	London Hackney Carriages Act 1843	In section 23, the words "or conductor", wherever occurring; and the words "or metropolitan stage carriage".
6 & 7 Vict. c. 86	London Hackney Carriages Act 1843	In section 24, the words "or conductor", wherever occurring; and the words from "and payment" to "by such justice".
6 & 7 Vict. c. 86	London Hackney Carriages Act 1843	In section 25, the word "conductor", wherever occurring.
6 & 7 Vict. c. 86	London Hackney Carriages Act 1843	In section 27, the words (wherever occurring) "or conductor", "or as conductor" and "or as a conductor"; the words "or as driver or conductor of any metropolitan stage carriage"; and the words "or as driver or conductor of such metropolitan stage carriage".
6 & 7 Vict. c. 86	London Hackney Carriages Act 1843	In section 28, the words "or driver or conductor of a metropolitan stage carriage"; the word "conductor"; the words "with or without hard labour, as the justice shall direct"; the words "or metropolitan stage carriage"; and the words "or conductor", wherever occurring.
6 & 7 Vict. c. 86	London Hackney Carriages Act 1843	Section 30.
6 & 7 Vict. c. 86	London Hackney Carriages Act 1843	In section 33, the words from "and also" to "place provided for him"; and the words from "and every driver or conductor" (where last occurring) to "upon such carriage".
6 & 7 Vict. c. 86	London Hackney Carriages Act 1843	In section 35, the words "or the driver or the conductor of any metropolitan stage carriage"; and the words "or conductor" and "and conductor", wherever occurring.
6 & 7 Vict. c. 86	London Hackney Carriages Act 1843	Sections 36 and 37.
6 & 7 Vict. c. 86	London Hackney Carriages Act 1843	In section 38, the words from "except such" to "this Act". In section 39, the words from "and in case of nonpayment" onwards.
6 & 7 Vict. c. 86	London Hackney Carriages Act 1843	Sections 40, 41, 42 and 43. In section 44, the words "or metropolitan stage carriage".
6 & 7 Vict. c. 86	London Hackney Carriages Act 1843	Sections 45 and 46. The Schedule.
16 & 17 Vict. c. 33	London Hackney Carriage Act 1853	In section 2, the words "metropolitan stage and" and "metropolitan stage or".
16 & 17 Vict. c. 33	London Hackney Carriage Act 1853	Section 11.
16 & 17 Vict. c. 33	London Hackney Carriage Act 1853	In section 12, the words "metropolitan stage carriages or".
16 & 17 Vict. c. 33	London Hackney Carriage Act 1853	In section 13, the words "metropolitan stage carriages or" and "and at places where metropolitan stage carriages usually call or ply for hire".
16 & 17 Vict. c. 33	London Hackney Carriage Act 1853	Sections 14 and 15.
16 & 17 Vict. c. 33	London Hackney Carriage Act 1853	In section 17, the words "The driver or conductor of any metropolitan stage carriage, or", "respectively", and "or in default of payment to imprisonment".
16 & 17 Vict. c. 33	London Hackney Carriage Act 1853	In section 19, the words "or in default of payment be imprisoned".
16 & 17 Vict. c. 127	London Hackney Carriage (No. 2) Act 1853	In section 16, the words "or metropolitan stage carriage".
30 & 31 Vict. c. 134	Metropolitan Streets Act 1867	Section 17.
32 & 33 Vict. c. 115	Metropolitan Public Carriage Act 1869	Section 5.
32 & 33 Vict. c. 115	Metropolitan Public Carriage Act 1869	In sections 6 and 7, the words "and stage" and "or stage", wherever occurring.
32 & 33 Vict. c. 115	Metropolitan Public Carriage Act 1869	In section 8, the words from "and no stage carriage" to "Secretary of State"; the words "or stage", wherever occurring; the words "in the case of a hackney carriage"; the words "and in the case of a stage carriage, that the conductor or driver, as the case may require"; and the words "or conductor".
32 & 33 Vict. c. 115	Metropolitan Public Carriage Act 1869	In section 9, the words "or stage", wherever occurring.
32 & 33 Vict. c. 115	Metropolitan Public Carriage Act 1869	In section 15, the words "and metropolitan stage carriages".
7 Edw. 7. c. 55	London Cab and Stage Carriage Act 1907	Section 1(2).
7 Edw. 7. c. 55	London Cab and Stage Carriage Act 1907	Sections 3 and 5.
7 Edw. 7. c. 55	London Cab and Stage Carriage Act 1907	In section 6(2), the words "stage carriages, metropolitan stage carriages", "stage carriage", and "metropolitan stage carriage".
23 & 24 Geo. 5. c. 14	London Passenger Transport Act 1933	Section 51.
24 & 25 Geo. 5. c. 50	Road Traffic Act 1934	Section 41(8).
15 & 16 Geo. 6 & 1 Eliz. 2. c. 39	Motor Vehicles (International Circulation) Act 1952	Section 3.
1967 c. 76	Road Traffic Regulation Act 1967	In section 21(6), the words from "and references" onwards.
1967 c. 76	Road Traffic Regulation Act 1967	Section 110(1).
1967 c. 76	Road Traffic Regulation Act 1967	Schedule 7.
1967 c. 76	Road Traffic Regulation Act 1967	In Schedule 8, paragraph 4.
1969 c. 60	Transport (London) Amendment Act 1969	The whole act.

==== Part XVIII: Stamp Duties ====
Part XVIII — Stamp Duties
Citation	Short title	Extent of repeal
54 & 55 Vict. c. 39	Stamp Act 1891	In Schedule 1, the heading "Faculty or Dispensation of any other kind".
59 & 60 Vict. c. 28	Finance Act 1896	In section 39, the words from "Part Three" to "1891".
10 & 11 Geo. 5. c. 18	Finance Act 1920	Section 36.
1 & 2 Geo. 6. c. 46	Finance Act 1938	Section 51.
2 & 3 Geo. 6. c. 41	Finance Act 1939	In section 35(2), the words "and shall be exempt from stamp duty".
10 & 11 Geo. 6. c. 35	Finance Act 1947	Section 56.
11 & 12 Geo. 6. c. 49	Finance Act 1948	Section 75.
12, 13 & 14 Geo. 6. c. 47	Finance Act 1949	Section 34.
7 & 8 Eliz. 2. c. 58	Finance Act 1959	In section 30, in subsection (4), paragraphs (a) and (b) and the words "and the said", and subsection (5).
7 & 8 Eliz. 2. c. 58	Finance Act 1959	Section 32.
1969 c. 48	Post Office Act 1969	Sections 115 and 116.
Acts of Parliament of Northern Ireland
1948 c. 15 (N.I.)	Finance Act (Northern Ireland) 1948	Sections 7 and 8.
1954 c. 3 (N.I.)	Finance (Miscellaneous Provisions) Act (Northern Ireland) 1954	Section 5.
1959 c. 9 (N.I.)	Finance Act (Northern Ireland) 1959	In section 5, in subsection (4), paragraphs (a) and (b) and the words "and the said", and subsection (5).

==== Part XIX: Supervisory Powers of Superior Courts ====
Part XIX — Supervisory Powers of Superior Courts
Citation	Short title	Extent of repeal
54 Geo. 3. c. 159	Harbours Act 1814	Section 23.
1 Geo. 4. c. 100	Militia (City of London) Act 1820	Section 48.
9 Geo. 4. c. 69	Night Poaching Act 1828	Section 7.
1 & 2 Will. 4. c. 32	Game Act 1831	Section 45.
1 & 2 Will. 4. c. 37	Truck Act 1831	Section 17.
1 & 2 Will. 4. c. 55	Illicit Distillation (Ireland) Act 1831	Section 49.
1 & 2 Vict. c. 28	Bread (Ireland) Act 1838	In section 23, the words from the beginning to "record at Dublin; and".
3 & 4 Vict. c. 97	Railway Regulation Act 1840	Section 17.
7 & 8 Vict. c. 81	Marriages (Ireland) Act 1844	Section 80.
8 & 9 Vict. c. 16	Companies Clauses Consolidation Act 1845	Section 158, including that section as incorporated in any other Act.
8 & 9 Vict. c. 20	Railways Clauses Consolidation Act 1845	Section 156, including that section as incorporated in any other Act.
8 & 9 Vict. c. 109	Gaming Act 1845	Section 25.
10 & 11 Vict. c. 84	Vagrancy (Ireland) Act 1847	Section 6.
14 & 15 Vict. c. 92	Summary Jurisdiction (Ireland) Act 1851	Section 24.
16 & 17 Vict. c. 119	Betting Act 1853	Section 14.
17 & 18 Vict. c. 38	Gaming Houses Act 1854	Section 11.
17 & 18 Vict. c. 103	Towns Improvement (Ireland) Act 1854	Section 96, including that section as incorporated in any other Act.
22 & 23 Vict. c. 66	Sale of Gas Act 1859	Section 24.
24 & 25 Vict. c. 97	Malicious Damage Act 1861	Section 69.
24 & 25 Vict. c. 100	Offences against the Person Act 1861	Section 72.
25 & 26 Vict. c. 114	Poaching Prevention Act 1862	Section 5.
35 & 36 Vict. c. 50	Railway Rolling Stock Protection Act 1872	Section 7.
41 & 42 Vict. c. 52	Public Health (Ireland) Act 1878	Section 261.
26 Geo. 5 & 1 Edw. 8. c. 16	Coinage Offences Act 1936	Section 4(4).

==== Part XX: War and Emergency ====
Part XX — War and Emergency
Citation	Short title	Extent of repeal
9 & 10 Geo. 5. c. 33	Treaty of Peace Act 1919	The whole act.
2 & 3 Geo. 6. c. 75	Compensation (Defence) Act 1939	In section 17(1), in the definition of "emergency powers" paragraph (a) and the word "or" immediately preceding paragraph (c).
7 & 8 Geo. 6. c. 5	Landlord and Tenant (Requisitioned Land) Act 1944	In section 5, in the definition of "Emergency powers", paragraphs (a) and (b).
7 & 8 Geo. 6. c. 34	Validation of War-time Leases Act 1944	The whole act.
1 & 2 Eliz. 2. c. 47	Emergency Laws (Miscellaneous Provisions) Act 1953	In section 2, the words from "and accordingly" onwards.
1 & 2 Eliz. 2. c. 47	Emergency Laws (Miscellaneous Provisions) Act 1953	Section 3(5).
1 & 2 Eliz. 2. c. 47	Emergency Laws (Miscellaneous Provisions) Act 1953	Section 5(1) from the beginning to the words "Regulation but".
1 & 2 Eliz. 2. c. 47	Emergency Laws (Miscellaneous Provisions) Act 1953	Sections 9 and 11.
1 & 2 Eliz. 2. c. 47	Emergency Laws (Miscellaneous Provisions) Act 1953	In section 12, in subsections (1) and (2) the words "or the Minister of Transport", and in subsection (3) the word "four".
1 & 2 Eliz. 2. c. 47	Emergency Laws (Miscellaneous Provisions) Act 1953	In section 13, the words "nine and eleven", the words from "and paragraphs" to "thereto" and the words from "and Part II" onwards.
1 & 2 Eliz. 2. c. 47	Emergency Laws (Miscellaneous Provisions) Act 1953	Section 14(2).
1 & 2 Eliz. 2. c. 47	Emergency Laws (Miscellaneous Provisions) Act 1953	Schedule 3.
1 & 2 Eliz. 2. c. 52	Enemy Property Act 1953	The whole Act except sections 4(1) and (2), 16 and 18.
1969 c. 20	Foreign Compensation Act 1969	Section 1(6).

==== Part XXI: Miscellaneous ====
Part XXI — Miscellaneous
Citation	Short title	Description	Extent of repeal
27 Geo. 2. c. 19	Bedford Level Act 1754	(Bedford Level).	Section 49.
59 Geo. 3. c. 7	Cutlery Trade Act 1819	Cutlery Trade Act 1819.	The whole act.
4 Geo. 4. c. 46	Capital Punishments, etc. Act 1823	An Act for repealing the capital punishments inflicted by several Acts of the 6th and 27th years of King George the Second; and of the 3rd, 4th and 22nd years of King George the Third; and for providing other punishments in lieu thereof, and in lieu of the punishment of frame breaking under an Act of the 28th year of the same reign.	The whole act.
3 & 4 Vict. c. 97	Railway Regulation Act 1840	Railway Regulation Act 1840.	Section 21.
23 & 24 Vict. c. 37	Castle Stewart and Nairn Road Assessment Act 1860	An Act to levy an assessment in the county of Inverness to discharge a debt on the Castle Stewart and Nairn Road in the said county.	The whole act.
35 & 36 Vict. c. 94	Licensing Act 1872	Licensing Act 1872.	In section 39, the words "or confirm".
35 & 36 Vict. c. 94	Licensing Act 1872	Licensing Act 1872.	In section 75, the words from "and in construing" onwards.
37 & 38 Vict. c. 40	Board of Trade Arbitrations &c. Act 1874	Board of Trade Arbitrations &c. Act 1874.	In section 4, the words from "An order" onwards.
50 & 51 Vict. c. 51	Valuation of Lands (Scotland) Amendment Act 1887	Valuation of Lands (Scotland) Amendment Act 1887.	The whole act.
12, 13 & 14 Geo. 6. c. 68	Representation of the People Act 1949	Representation of the People Act 1949.	In section 64(2)(b)(i), the words from "(other than" to "electoral areas)".
8 & 9 Eliz. 2. c. 64	Building Societies Act 1960	Building Societies Act 1960.	In section 72(2), the words "'director' and".
1969 c. 15	Representation of the People Act 1969	Representation of the People Act 1969.	In section 8(1)(b)(i), the words from "(other than" to "electoral areas)".
1973 c. 56	Land Compensation (Scotland) Act 1973	Land Compensation (Scotland) Act 1973.	Section 81(2).
1975 c. 24	House of Commons Disqualification Act 1975	House of Commons Disqualification Act 1975.	In Part III of Schedule 1, the words "Local government officers, the following:—".
1975 c. 25	Northern Ireland Assembly Disqualification Act 1975	Northern Ireland Assembly Disqualification Act 1975.	In Part III of Schedule 1, the words "Local government officers, the following:—".

== Subsequent developments ==
The entry relating to the Licensing (Scotland) Act 1903 (3 Edw. 7. c. 25) in part I of the schedule 2 to the act and the entry relating to the Miscellaneous Financial Provisions Act 1955 (4 & 5 Eliz. 2. c. 6) in part II of the second schedule to the act were repealed by section 1(1) of, and part XIX of schedule 1 to, the Statute Law (Repeals) Act 1977, which came into force on 16 June 1977.

In the entry relating to the Inebriates Act 1898 (61 & 62 Vict. c. 60) in part I of the schedule 2 to the act, the words "and the Licensing (Scotland) Act 1959 (7 & 8 Eliz. 2. c. 51), section 160" were repealed by section 1(1) of, and part XVII of schedule 1 to, the Statute Law (Repeals) Act 1978, which came into force on 31 July 1978.

The entry relating to the Protection of Birds Act 1967 was repealed by section 73(1) of, and part II of schedule 17 to, the Wildlife and Countryside Act 1981, which came into force on 30 November 1981.

Sections 1(1) and 2(3) of, in section 3(2), the words from "or Isle of Man" to the end, and schedule 1 to, the act were repealed by group 2 of part IX of schedule 1 to, the Statute Law (Repeals) Act 1998, which came into force on 19 November 1998. The orders in council made under section 3(2) of the act have lapsed because of the repeal made to that section by the 1998 act

The entry relating to the Civil Defence Act 1939 in part II of schedule 2 to the act was repealed by section 32(2) of, and Schedule 3 to, the Civil Contingencies Act 2004, which came into force on 10 December 2004.

== See also ==
- Statute Law (Repeals) Act
