= National Health Service Reorganisation Act 1973 =

Act of the Parliament of the United Kingdom

National Health Service Reorganisation Act 1973 (Note: Section 58(1).)
- Act of Parliament
- Parliament of the United Kingdom
- Long title: An Act to make further provision with respect to the national health service in England and Wales and amendments of the enactments relating to the national health service in Scotland; and for purposes connected with those matters.
- Citation: 1973 c. 32
- Introduced by: Lord Aberdare (Lords)
- Territorial extent: England and Wales; Scotland; Northern Ireland; (Note: Section 58(4)–(6).)

Dates
- Royal assent: 5 July 1973
- Commencement: various (Note: Section 58(2)–(3).)
- Repealed: Scotland: 1 January 1979; England and Wales and Northern Ireland: 1 April 1996

Other legislation
- Amends: Polish Resettlement Act 1947; London Government Act 1963; Pensions (Increase) Act 1971
- Amended by: House of Commons Disqualification Act 1975; Northern Ireland Assembly Disqualification Act 1975; Nursing Homes Act 1975; Health Services Act 1976; Statute Law (Repeals) Act 1977; National Health Service Act 1977; Interpretation Act 1978; Employment Protection (Consolidation) Act 1978; Dentists Act 1984; Food Act 1984; Tribunals and Inquiries Act 1992
- Repealed by: Scotland: National Health Service (Scotland) Act 1978; England and Wales and Northern IrelandHealth Authorities Act 1995

Status: Repealed

Text of statute as originally enacted

Revised text of statute as amended

The National Health Service Reorganisation Act 1973 (c. 32) was an act of the Parliament of the United Kingdom. The purpose of the act was to reorganise the National Health Service in England and Wales. Separate legislation, the National Health Service (Scotland) Act 1972, was passed a year earlier for Scotland. This was the first time the NHS had been reorganised in the UK since it was established in 1948. The next major reorganisations would be the Health Services Act 1980 and the Health Authorities Act 1995 which repealed the 1973 Act.

It created a two-tier system of area health authorities (AHAs) which answered to regional health authorities (RHAs). It also created family practitioner committees, community health councils and a Health Service Commissioner for England and for Wales.

== Background ==
In July 1968, the Minister of Health, Kenneth Robinson, published a green paper, Administrative structure of the medical and related services in England and Wales. It proposed creating about 50 single-tier area boards taking responsibility for all health functions in each local government area. It triggered years of debate about the relationship between the NHS, local authorities, and health and social care. In September 1968, the separate ministries of health and of social care merged to form the Department of Health and Social Security.

In 1970, Richard Crossman rewrote Robinson's 1968 proposals, publishing a second green paper. Crossman rejected local authorities managing the health service and instead proposed that area authorities should remain directly under the Department of Health and Social Security. He retained the idea that the number and areas of the proposed new health authorities should match those of the proposed new local authorities, but added regional health councils which could undertake those activities for which the local area boards were too small.

Following the election of the Conservative government of 1970, the new Secretary of State, Keith Joseph, amended Crossman’s 1970 proposals. Under these plans published in July 1971, the upper-tier regional health authorities would also be responsible for general planning and the allocation of resources to the lower-tier area health authorities, as well as the coordination and supervision of the latter’s activities. This two-tier health system was in keeping with the Conservative government's proposals for a two-tier system of local government.

After years of debate, reform was made under the NHS Reorganisation Act 1973 which came into effect on 1 April 1974. This was the first time the service had been reorganised since it was established in 1948.

== Effects ==
The act ended the 1948 tripartite system of separate provision of hospital services under regional hospital boards, hospital management committees and boards of governors; family practitioner services under executive councils; and community health services (including health visiting, maternity services, vaccination and ambulance services) under local authorities. These organisations were replaced by one unitary structure of 90 area health authorities (AHAs) answering to 14 regional health authorities (RHAs) and, ultimately, to the Secretary of State for Social Services. AHAs were matched to local authority boundaries. Each AHA district centred on a district general hospital, with some AHAs multi-district and some single district. Responsibility for public health was also taken from local authorities and given to the secretary of state, who also took on responsibility for school health. In effect, there was also a third lower administrative tier as the work of hospital management was done at district general hospital level.

The 1973 act also established several committees. Joint consultative committees were established to advise AHAs and local authorities on the performance of their duties under the act. The act also required AHAs to establish family practitioner committees responsible for general medical services (as well as dental, pharmaceutical and ophthalmic services). Community health councils were established to give patients a voice into the system.

A Health Service Ombudsman was established with powers to investigate NHS bodies for England and Wales (the Health Service Commissioner for Scotland was established under the 1972 Act for Scotland). The provisions of the act relating to the Health Service Commissioners have largely been replaced by the Health Service Commissioners Act 1993.

The National Health Service had been excluded from the remit of the Parliamentary Commissioner for Administration when the Parliamentary Commissioner Act 1967 became law. The impetus for the establishment of a Health Ombudsman arose from growing dissatisfaction with the quality of service in the NHS through the 1960s. This was encapsulated by scandals about the care provided to the elderly and mentally ill at Ely Hospital in Cardiff, Farleigh Hospital in Bristol and Whittingham Hospital near Preston. Hospitals were free to determine their own complaints procedures for the investigation of complaints, subject only to guidance by the Ministry of Health. The Davies Report, published in 1973, criticised the complaints system then in place. The Government announced in 1972 that it intended to establish a Health Service Ombudsman and that this was to be at the apex of the NHS complaints system.

The provisions establishing the ombudsman posts were not extensively debated in the House of Commons, indicating the consensus around their establishment. The act was introduced by a Conservative administration which had been in power since 1970. The Labour party returned to power in 1974 and implemented the planned reorganization of the health service.

The incoming Labour government of 1974 published a paper on Democracy in the NHS in May that added local government representatives to the new RHAs and increased their proportion on each AHA to a third.

== Subsequent developments ==
The whole act was repealed for Scotland by section 109(b) of, and schedule 17 to, the National Health Service (Scotland) Act 1978, which came into force on 1 January 1979.

== Subsequent reorganisations ==
A Royal Commission on the National Health Service published its report in 1979. It heard complaints that AHAs added an extra and unnecessary tier of management. In 1982, the AHAs were replaced by 192 district health authorities (DHAs) under the Health Services Act 1980, but the RHAs remained. Initially, there were 14 RHAs, but they were reduced in number to 8 in 1994. Both DHAs and RHAs were abolished altogether in 1996 and replaced by eight regional offices of the NHS Executive as a result of the Health Authorities Act 1995.

== See also ==
- National Health Service Act 1977
