= List of district health authorities in England and Wales =

This is a list of district health authorities in England and Wales which existed from 1982 to 1996 when they were replaced by health authorities. District health authorities took on the functions of area health authorities when the latter were abolished in 1982.

== Authorities in Northern Region ==
=== District authorities created 1982 ===
Sixteen district health authorities were formed in the Northern Region in 1982, replacing nine area health authorities:

AHA 1974–82	District Health Authority 1982	Local Government Areas	Changes
Cleveland	Hartlepool	Hartlepool	
Cleveland	North Tees	Stockton-on-Tees	
Cleveland	South Tees	Langbaurgh and Middlesbrough	
Cumbria	East Cumbria	Carlisle, Eden, part of Allerdale (Keswick and Wigton areas)	
Cumbria	South Cumbria	Barrow-in-Furness (borough) and South Lakeland	
Cumbria	West Cumbria	Copeland, part of Allerdale (Cockermouth, Maryport and Workington areas)	
Durham	Darlington	Darlington and Teesdale	Part of South Durham District 1992
Durham	Durham	Chester-le-Street, Durham, and Easington	Part of North Durham District 1992
Durham	North West Durham	Derwentside	Part of North Durham District 1992
Durham	South West Durham	Sedgefield and Wear Valley	Part of South Durham District 1992
Gateshead	Gateshead	Gateshead (Same area as AHA)	
Newcastle	Newcastle	Newcastle (Same area as AHA)	
Northumberland	Northumberland	County of Northumberland (Same area as AHA)	
North Tyneside	North Tyneside	North Tyneside (Same area as AHA)	
South Tyneside	South Tyneside	South Tyneside (Same area as AHA)	
Sunderland	Sunderland	Sunderland (Same area as AHA)	

=== 1992–1994 ===
Reorganisation in 1992 led to a reduction in the number of districts to fourteen:

District Health Authority	County	Area
East Cumbria	Cumbria	Unchanged
Gateshead	Tyne and Wear	Unchanged
Hartlepool	Cleveland	Unchanged
Newcastle	Tyne and Wear	Unchanged
Northumberland	Northumberland	Unchanged
North Durham	County Durham	Districts of Chester-le-Street, Derwentside, Durham and Easington
North Tees	Cleveland	Unchanged
North Tyneside	Tyne and Wear	Unchanged
South Cumbria	Cumbria	Unchanged
South Durham	County Durham	Districts of Darlington, Sedgefield, Teesdale, and Wear Valley
South Tees	Cleveland	Unchanged
South Tyneside	Tyne and Wear	Unchanged
Sunderland	Tyne and Wear	Unchanged
West Cumbria	Cumbria	Unchanged

=== 1994–1996 ===
In 1994 the Northern region became part of the larger Northern and Yorkshire Region, and there were further amalgamations of districts:

- North Cumbria District formed from East Cumbria and West Cumbria
- South of Tyne District was formed from Gateshead and South Tyneside
- Tees District formed from Hartlepool, North Tees and South Tees
- Morecambe Bay District formed in (North Western Region) from South Cumbria and Lancaster

== Authorities in Yorkshire Region ==
=== District Authorities created 1982 ===
Seventeen district health authorities were formed in the Yorkshire Region in 1982, replacing seven Area Health Authorities:

AHA 1974–82	District Health Authority 1982	Local Government Areas	Changes
Bradford, North Yorkshire	Airedale	Craven, part of Bradford (Keighley, Ilkley and Worth Valley areas)	Abolished 1992 - part to Bradford, remainder (Craven District) to North Yorkshire
Bradford	Bradford	Part of Bradford (Baildon, Bingley, Clayton, Denholme, Eccleshill, Idle, Queensbury and Shipley areas)	Gained part of abolished Airedale 1992
Calderdale	Calderdale	Calderdale Same area as AHA	Part of West Yorkshire District 1993
Humberside	Beverley : renamed East Yorkshire 1982	Beverley, East Yorkshire	Part of East Riding District 1993
Humberside	Grimsby	Great Grimsby, Cleethorpes	Part of Grimsby and Scunthorpe District 1993
Humberside	Hull	Holderness, Kingston upon Hull	Part of East Riding District 1993
Humberside	Scunthorpe	Boothferry, Glanford and Scunthorpe	Part of Grimsby and Scunthorpe District 1993
Kirklees	Dewsbury	Part of Kirklees (Batley, Birstall, Birkenshaw, Cleckheaton, Dewsbury, Heckmondwike, Mirfield, Spen, and Thornhill areas)	Part of West Yorkshire District 1993
Kirklees	Huddersfield	Part of Kirklees (Almondbury, Colne Valley, Deighton, Denby Dale, Golcar, Holme Valley, Huddersfield and Kirkburton areas	Part of West Yorkshire District 1993
Leeds	Leeds Eastern	Part of Leeds (Barwick and Kippax, Burmantofts, Chapel Allerton, Garforth and Swillington, Halton, Harehills, Hunslet, Middleton, Moortown, North, Rothwell, Roundhay, Seacroft, Wetherby, and Whinmoor areas)	Part of Leeds District 1991
Leeds	Leeds Western	Part of Leeds (Aireborough, Armley, Beeston, Bramley, Headingley, Horsforth, Kirkstall, Morley, Otley, Pudsey, Wharfedale and Wortley areas)	Part of Leeds District 1991
North Yorkshire	Harrogate	Part of Harrogate (Harrogate, Knaresborough and Ripon areas)	Part of North Yorkshire District 1992
North Yorkshire	Northallerton	Richmondshire, part of Hambleton (Bedale, Stokesley and Thirsk areas), part of Harrogate (Masham area)	Part of North Yorkshire District 1992
North Yorkshire	Scarborough	Scarborough, part of Ryedale (Malton, Norton and Pickering areas)	Part of North Yorkshire District 1992
North Yorkshire	York	Selby, York, part of Hambleton (Easingwold area), part of Harrogate (Ouseburn and Poppleton areas), part of Ryedale (Flaxton and Helmsley areas)	Part of North Yorkshire District 1992
Wakefield	Pontefract	Part of Wakefield (Castleford, Featherstone, Hemsworth, Normanton, Pontefract areas)	Part of Wakefield District 1993
Wakefield	Wakefield	Part of Wakefield (Horbury, Ossett, Stanley, Wakefield areas)	Absorbed Pontefract District 1993

=== 1991–1996 ===
Reorganisation in 1991 to 1993 led to a reduction in the number of districts to seven:

District Health Authority	County	Area
Bradford	West Yorkshire	City of Bradford
East Riding	Humberside	The Districts of Beverley, East Yorkshire, Holderness and Kingston upon Hull
Grimsby and Scunthorpe	Humberside	The Districts of Boothferry, Cleethorpes, Great Grimsby, Glanford and Scunthorpe
Leeds	West Yorkshire	The City of Leeds
North Yorkshire	North Yorkshire	Entire County
Wakefield	West Yorkshire	The City of Wakefield
West Yorkshire	West Yorkshire	Calderdale and Kirklees Metropolitan Boroughs

In 1994 the Yorkshire Region became part of the Yorkshire and Northern Region.

== Authorities in Trent Region ==
=== District Authorities created 1982 ===
Twelve district health authorities were formed in the Trent Region in 1982, replacing eight Area Health Authorities:

AHA 1974–82	District Health Authority 1982	Local government areas	Changes
Barnsley	Barnsley	Barnsley (same area as AHA)	
Derbyshire	North Derbyshire	Bolsover, Chesterfield, North East Derbyshire, part of High Peak (Buxton, Chapel-en-le-Frith, New Mills, Whaley Bridge areas), part of West Derbyshire (Bakewell and Matlock areas)	
Derbyshire	Southern Derbyshire	Amber Valley, Derby, Erewash, South Derbyshire, part of West Derbyshire (Ashbourne and Wirksworth areas)	
Doncaster	Doncaster	Doncaster (same area as AHA)	
Leicestershire	Leicestershire	County of Leicestershire (same area as AHA)	
Lincolnshire	North Lincolnshire	Lincoln, West Lindsey, part of East Lindsey (Mablethorpe, Skegness and Spilsby areas)	
Lincolnshire	Southern Lincolnshire	Boston, South Holland, South Kesteven, part of North Kesteven (Sleaford area), part of East Lindsey (Alford, Horncastle and Woodhall Spa areas)	
Nottinghamshire	Bassetlaw	Bassetlaw	Part of North Nottinghamshire District 1992
Nottinghamshire	Central Nottinghamshire	Mansfield, Newark, part of Ashfield (all except Hucknall)	Part of North Nottinghamshire District 1992
Nottinghamshire	Nottingham	Broxtowe, Gedling, Nottingham, Rushcliffe and part of Ashfield (Hucknall)	
Rotherham	Rotherham	Rotherham (same as AHA)	
Sheffield	Sheffield	Sheffield (same area as AHA)	

=== 1992–1996 ===
Reorganisation in 1992 led to a reduction in the number of districts to eleven by the creation of North Nottinghamshire District by the amalgamation of Bassetlaw and Central Nottinghamshire Districts.

In 1994 Lincolnshire District was formed from North Lincolnshire and South Lincolnshire

== Authorities in East Anglia Region ==
=== District authorities created 1982 ===
Eight district health authorities were formed in the East Anglian region in 1982, replacing three area health authorities:

AHA 1974–82	District Health Authority 1982	Local Government Areas	Changes
Cambridgeshire	Cambridge	Cambridge, East Cambridgeshire, most of South Cambridgeshire (all except Caxton and Papworth areas)	
Cambridgeshire	Huntingdon	Most of Huntingdon (all except Norman Cross area), part of South Cambridgeshire (Caxton and Papworth areas)	
Cambridgeshire	Peterborough	Peterborough, part of Huntingdon (Norman Cross area), part of Fenland (Chatteris, March, North Witchford, Whittlesey areas)	Part of North West Anglia District 1992
Cambridgeshire, Norfolk	West Norfolk and Wisbech	Part of Fenland (Wisbech), King's Lynn and West Norfolk, part of Breckland (Swaffham and Thetford rural areas)	Part of North West Anglia District 1992
Norfolk, Suffolk	Great Yarmouth and Waveney	Great Yarmouth, Waveney, part of Broadland (3 parishes), part of South Norfolk (7 parishes)	
Norfolk	Norwich	Norwich, part of Breckland (East Dereham, Mitford & Launditch, Wayland areas), part of North Norfolk (5 parishes), most of South Norfolk (except 7 parishes)	
Suffolk	East Suffolk	Ipswich, Suffolk Coastal, Part of Babergh (Cosford, Hadleigh and Samford areas), part of Mid Suffolk (Eye, Gipping and Stowmarket areas)	Part of Suffolk District 1993
Norfolk, Suffolk	West Suffolk	Part of Breckland (parish of Thetford), Forest Heath, St Edmundsbury, part of Babergh (Melford and Sudbury areas), part of Mid Suffolk (Hartismere and Thedwastre areas)	Part of Suffolk District 1993

=== 1993–1996 ===
Reorganisation in 1992 and 1993 led to a reduction in the number of districts to six:

District Health Authority	County	Area
Cambridge	Cambridgeshire	Unchanged
Great Yarmouth and Waveney	Norfolk, Suffolk	Unchanged. Abolished 1994 to East Norfolk, Suffolk Districts
Huntingdon	Cambridgeshire	Unchanged
North West Anglia	Cambridgeshire, Norfolk	Districts of Fenland, King's Lynn and West Norfolk, Peterborough; most of Breckland
Norwich	Norfolk	Gained parish of Thetford 1993. Abolished 1994 to East Norfolk District
Suffolk	Suffolk	Entire County except Waveney District

A further change was made in 1994 (at the same time the Region was merged with Oxford Region to form Anglia and Oxford Region):

- East Norfolk District formed from Norwich District and the part of Great Yarmouth and Waveney District in Norfolk. Waveney, in Suffolk, was transferred to Suffolk District.

== Authorities in North West Thames Region ==
In 1982 the boundary of the region was adjusted when part of the City of Westminster was placed in the North East Thames Region. In 1990 the area was returned to the North West Thames Region. Also in 1982 the borough of Spelthorne, Surrey was received from the South West Thames Region, to which it returned in 1993.

=== District Authorities created 1982 ===
Fourteen district health authorities were formed in the North West Thames Region in 1982, replacing seven Area Health Authorities:

AHA 1974–82	District Health Authority 1982	Local Government Areas	Changes
Barnet	Barnet	Barnet (same area as AHA)	
Bedfordshire	South Bedfordshire	Luton, South Bedfordshire	Part of Bedfordshire District 1994
Bedfordshire	North Bedfordshire	Mid Bedfordshire, North Bedfordshire	Part of Bedfordshire District 1994
Brent and Harrow	Brent	Brent	Part of Parkside District 1988 †
Brent and Harrow	Harrow	Harrow	Part of Brent and Harrow District 1993
Ealing, Hammersmith and Hounslow	Ealing	Ealing	Part of Ealing, Hammersmith and Hounslow District 1993
Ealing, Hammersmith and Hounslow, Surrey	Hounslow and Spelthorne	Hounslow, Spelthorne	Part to Ealing, Hammersmith and Hounslow District, part to North West Surrey District 1993
Ealing, Hammersmith and Hounslow	Hammersmith and Fulham	Hammersmith and Fulham	Part of Riverside District 1985‡
Hertfordshire	East Hertfordshire	Broxbourne, East Hertfordshire, Welwyn Hatfield	Part of East and North Hertfordshire District 1992
Hertfordshire	North Hertfordshire	North Hertfordshire, Stevenage	Part of East and North Hertfordshire District 1992
Hertfordshire	North West Hertfordshire	Dacorum, St Albans	
Hertfordshire	South West Hertfordshire	Hertsmere, Three Rivers, Watford	
Hillingdon	Hillingdon	Hillingdon	
Kensington, Chelsea and Westminster	Paddington and North Kensington	Part of City of Westminster (Paddington area), part of Kensington and Chelsea (North Kensington area)	Part of Parkside District 1988 †
Kensington, Chelsea and Westminster	Victoria	Part of City of Westminster (except Paddington area), part of Kensington and Chelsea (except North Kensington area)	Part of Riverside District 1985‡

There were changes in the central London districts in 1985 and 1988:

‡ Riverside District was formed in 1985 by the amalgamation of Hammersmith and Fulham and Victoria Districts.

† Parkside District was created by the amalgamation of the Paddington & North Kensington and Brent Districts in 1988. In 1990 it was enlarged by gaining part of the City of Westminster from the abolished Bloomsbury District in the neighbouring North East Thames District. Parkside was abolished with part going to Kensington Chelsea and Westminster and part to Brent and Harrow in 1993.

=== 1992–1996 ===
Reorganisation in 1992 to 1994 led to a reduction in the number of districts to nine:

District Health Authority	County	Area
Barnet	Greater London	London Borough of Barnet (unchanged)
Bedfordshire	Bedfordshire	County of Bedfordshire
Brent and Harrow	Greater London	London Boroughs of Brent, Harrow
Ealing, Hammersmith and Hounslow	Greater London	London Boroughs of Ealing, Hammersmith and Fulham, Hounslow
East and North Hertfordshire	Hertfordshire	Districts of Broxbourne, East Hertfordshire, North Hertfordshire, Stevenage and Welwyn Hatfield
Hillingdon	Greater London	London Borough of Hillingdon (unchanged)
Kensington, Chelsea and Westminster	Greater London	Royal Borough of Kensington and Chelsea and City of Westminster
North West Hertfordshire	Hertfordshire	Districts of Dacorum and St Albans (unchanged)
South West Hertfordshire	Hertfordshire	Districts of Hertsmere, Three Rivers and Watford (unchanged)

== Authorities In North East Thames Region ==
In 1982 the boundary of the region was adjusted when part of the City of Westminster was received from in the North West Thames Region. In 1990 the area was returned.

=== District Authorities created 1982 ===
Fourteen district health authorities were formed in the North East Thames Region in 1982, replacing seven Area Health Authorities:

AHA 1974–82	District Health Authority 1982	Local Government Areas	Changes
Barking and Havering, Essex	Barking, Havering and Brentwood	Barking and Dagenham, Havering, Brentwood	Part to Barking and Havering District, part to South Essex District 1993
Essex	Basildon and Thurrock	Basildon, Thurrock	Part of South Essex District 1993
Camden and Islington, Kensington, Chelsea and Westminster	Bloomsbury	Part of Camden (Bloomsbury, Holborn and St Pancras areas), part of City of Westminster (Regent's Park and West End areas)	Abolished 1990, part to Bloomsbury and Islington District†, part to Parkside District (North West Thames Region)
City and East London	City and Hackney	City of London, Hackney	Part of East London and The City District 1993
Enfield and Haringey	Enfield	Enfield	Part of New River District 1993
Camden and Islington	Hampstead	Part of Camden (Hampstead area)	Part of Camden and Islington District 1993
Enfield and Haringey	Haringey	Haringey	Part of New River District 1993
Camden and Islington	Islington	Islington	Part of Bloomsbury and Islington District 1990†
Essex	Mid Essex	Chelmsford, Maldon, most of Braintree (Braintree and Witham areas)	Part of North Essex 1993
City and East London	Newham	Newham	Part of East London and The City District 1993
Essex	North East Essex	Colchester, Tendring, part of Braintree (Halstead area)	Part of North Essex District
Redbridge and Waltham Forest	Redbridge	Redbridge	Part of Redbridge and Waltham Forest 1993
Essex	Southend	Castle Point, Rochford, Southend-on-Sea	Part of South Essex District 1993
City and East London	Tower Hamlets	Tower Hamlets	Part of East London and The City District 1993
Redbridge and Waltham Forest	Waltham Forest	Waltham Forest	Part of Redbridge and Waltham Forest 1993
Essex	West Essex	Epping Fores, Harlow, Uttlesford	Part of North Essex District 1993

† Bloomsbury and Islington District was created in 1990. It consisted of the London Borough of Islington and 11 wards from the London Borough of Camden. It became part of Camden and Islington District in 1993.

=== 1993–1996 ===
Reorganisation in 1990 and 1993 led to a reduction in the number of districts to seven:

District Health Authority	County	Area
Barking and Havering	Greater London	London Boroughs of Barking and Dagenham and Havering
Camden and Islington	Greater London	London Boroughs of Camden and Islington
East London and The City	Greater London	The City of London & the Temples, and the London Boroughs of Hackney, Newham and Tower Hamlets
New River	Greater London	London Boroughs of Enfield and Haringey
North Essex	Essex	Districts of Braintree, Chelmsford, Colchester, Epping Forest, Harlow, Maldon, Tendring and Uttlesford
Redbridge and Waltham Forest	Greater London	London Boroughs of Redbridge and Waltham Forest
South Essex	Essex	Districts of Basildon, Brentwood, Castle Point, Rochford, Southend-on-Sea and Thurrock

== Authorities in South East Thames Region ==
=== District Authorities created 1982 ===
Fifteen district health authorities were formed in the South East Thames Region in 1982, replacing five Area Health Authorities:

AHA 1974–82	District Health Authority 1982	Local Government Areas	Changes
Bromley	Bromley	Bromley (same area as AHA)	
East Sussex	Brighton	Brighton, Hove, most of Lewes (all except Seaford)	Part of East Sussex District 1993
East Sussex	Eastbourne	Eastbourne, most of Wealden (all except 2 parishes), part of Lewes (Seaford)	Part of East Sussex District 1993
East Sussex	Hastings	Hastings, Rother, part of Wealden (2 parishes)	Part of East Sussex District 1993
Greenwich and Bexley	Bexley	Bexley	Part of Bexley and Greenwich District 1994
Greenwich and Bexley	Greenwich	Greenwich	Part of Bexley and Greenwich District 1994
Kent	Canterbury and Thanet	Canterbury, Thanet, part of Dover (Eastry area), part of Swale (Faversham area)	Part of East Kent District 1994
Kent	Dartford and Gravesham	Dartford, Gravesham, Sevenoaks (former Dartford Rural District area),	Part of West Kent District 1994
Kent	Maidstone	Maidstone, part of Tonbridge and Malling (Malling area)	Part of West Kent District 1994
Kent	Medway	Gillingham, Rochester-upon-Medway, part of Swale (Queenborough and Sittingbourne areas)	Part of West Kent District 1994
Kent	South East Kent	Ashford, Shepway, part of Dover (Deal, Dover and Sandwich areas)	Part of East Kent District 1994
Kent	Tunbridge Wells	Tunbridge Wells, part of Sevenoaks (Sevenoaks area	Part of West Kent District 1994
Lambeth, Southwark and Lewisham	Camberwell	Part of Southwark (Camberwell area), part of Lambeth (East Lambeth, Gipsy Hill, Herne Hill, Tulse Hill areas)	Part of South East London District 1993
Lambeth, Southwark and Lewisham	Lewisham and North Southwark	Lewisham, part of Southwark (Newington, Rotherhithe and Southwark areas)	Part of South East London District 1993
Lambeth, Southwark and Lewisham	West Lambeth	Part of Lambeth (West Lambeth area)	Part of South East London District 1993

=== 1993–1996 ===
Reorganisation in 1993 and 1994 led to a reduction in the number of districts to eight:

District Health Authority	County	Area
Bexley and Greenwich	Greater London	Bexley, Greenwich
Bromley	Greater London	(unchanged)
East Kent	Kent	Ashford, Canterbury, Dover, part of Swale (Faversham area), Shepway, Thanet
East Sussex	East Sussex	Entire County
South East London	Greater London	London Boroughs of Lambeth, Lewisham and Southwark
West Kent	Kent	Dartford, Gillingham, Gravesham, Maidstone, Rochester-upon-Medway, Sevenoaks, part of Tonbridge and Malling (Malling area) part of Swale (Queenborough and Sittingbourne areas), Tunbridge Wells

== Authorities in South West Thames Region ==
=== District Authorities created 1982 ===
Thirteen district health authorities were formed in the South West Thames Region in 1982, replacing five Area Health Authorities:

AHA 1974–82	District Health Authority 1982	Local Government Areas	Changes
Croydon	Croydon	Croydon (Same area as AHA)	
Kingston and Richmond, Surrey	Kingston and Esher	Kingston upon Thames, part of Elmbridge (Esher area)	Part of Kingston and Richmond District 1993
Kingston and Richmond; Merton, Sutton and Richmond	Richmond, Twickenham and Roehampton	Richmond upon Thames, part of Wandsworth (Putney and Roehampton areas)	Part of Kingston and Richmond District 1993
Merton, Sutton and Wandsworth	Merton and Sutton	Merton, Sutton	Part of Merton, Sutton and Wandsworth District 1994
Merton, Sutton and Wandsworth	Wandsworth	Part of Wandsworth (all except Putney and Roehampton areas)	Part of Merton, Sutton and Wandsworth District 1994
Surrey	East Surrey	Tandridge, part of Mole Valley (Dorking and Horley areas), part of Reigate and Banstead (Reigate area)	
Surrey	Mid Surrey	Epsom and Ewell, part of Reigate and Banstead (Banstead area), part of Elmbridge (Cobham, Oxshott and Stoke D'Abernon areas), part of Mole Valley (Leatherhead area)	
Surrey	North West Surrey	Runnymede, Woking, part of Elmbridge (Walton and Weybridge area)	
Surrey	South West Surrey	Most of Guildford (all except Ash area), part of Waverley (Godalming, Hambledon and Haslemere area)	
Surrey	West Surrey and North East Hampshire	Surrey Heath, part of Guildford (Ash area only), part of Waverley (Farnham area)	To North West Surrey District, part to South West Surrey 1993
West Sussex	Chichester	Chichester, part of Arun (Arundel and Bognor Regis areas)	
West Sussex	Cuckfield and Crawley: renamed Mid Downs 1982	Crawley, Mid Sussex, part of Horsham (Horsham area)	
West Sussex	Worthing	Adur, Worthing, part of Arun (Littlehampton area)	

=== 1993–1996 ===
Reorganisation in 1993 and 1994 led to a reduction in the number of districts to ten:

District Health Authority	County	Area
Chichester	West Sussex	Unchanged
Croydon	Greater London	Unchanged
East Surrey	Surrey	Unchanged
Kingston and Richmond	Greater London, Surrey	Kingston upon Thames, Richmond upon Thames, part of Elmbridge (Esher area), part of Wandsworth (Putney and Roehampton areas)
Merton, Sutton and Wandsworth	Greater London	Merton, Sutton, Part of Wandsworth (all except Putney and Roehampton areas)
Mid Downs	West Sussex	Unchanged
Mid Surrey	Surrey	Unchanged
North West Surrey	Surrey	Unchanged
South West Surrey	Surrey	Districts of Guildford and Waverley
Worthing	West Sussex	Unchanged

== Authorities in Wessex Region ==
=== District Authorities created 1982 ===
Ten district health authorities were formed in the Wessex Region in 1982, replacing four Area Health Authorities:

AHA 1974–82	District Health Authority 1982	Local Government Areas	Changes
Dorset	East Dorset	Bournemouth, Christchurch, Poole, Purbeck, Wimborne	Part of Dorset District in 1992
Dorset	West Dorset	North Dorset, West Dorset, Weymouth and Portland	Part of Dorset District 1992
Hampshire	Basingstoke and North Hampshire	Basingstoke and Deane, Hart, Rushmoor, part of East Hampshire (Alton area)	Part of North and Mid Hampshire District 1994
Hampshire	Southampton and South West Hampshire	New Forest, Southampton, part of Eastleigh (rural area), part of Test Valley (Romsey area)	
Hampshire	Winchester	Part of Test Valley (Andover and Stockbridge areas), most of Winchester (all except Droxford area), part of Eastleigh (Eastleigh area)	Part of North and Mid Hampshire District 1994
Hampshire	Portsmouth and South East Hampshire	Fareham, Gosport, Havant, Portsmouth, part of East Hampshire (Petersfield area)	
Isle of Wight	Isle of Wight	County of Isle of Wight (same area as AHA)	
Wiltshire	Bath	West Wiltshire, part of North Wiltshire (Calne, Chippenham, Malmesbury areas), part of Kennet (Devizes area)	Part of Bath and Wiltshire District 1994
Wiltshire	Salisbury	Salisbury	Part of Bath and Wiltshire District 1994
Wiltshire	Swindon	Thamesdown, part of Kennet (Marlborough, Pewsey and Ramsbury areas), part of North Wiltshire (Cricklade and Wootton Bassett areas)	Part of Bath and Wiltshire District 1994

=== 1994–1996 ===
Reorganisation in 1994 led to a reduction in the number of districts to six:

District Health Authority	County	Area
Bath and Wiltshire	Wiltshire	Entire County
Dorset	Dorset	Entire County
Isle of Wight	Isle of Wight	Entire County (unchanged)
North and Mid Hampshire	Hampshire	Districts of Basingstoke and Deane, Hart, and Rushmoor; part of East Hampshire (Alton area); part of Test Valley (Romsey area); most of Winchester (except 3 parishes); part of Eastleigh (Eastleigh area)
Portsmouth and South East Hampshire	Hampshire	Unchanged
Southampton and South West Hampshire	Hampshire	Unchanged

Also in 1994, the Wessex Region was merged with the South West Region to form the South and West Region.

== Authorities in Oxford Region ==
=== District Authorities created 1982 ===
Eight district health authorities were formed in the Wessex Region in 1982, replacing four Area Health Authorities:

AHA 1974–82	District Health Authority 1982	Local Government Areas	Changes
Berkshire, Buckinghamshire	East Berkshire	Bracknell, Slough, Windsor and Maidenhead, part of South Bucks (part formerly in Slough Rural District)	Part of Berkshire District, Buckinghamshire District 1993
Berkshire, Oxfordshire	West Berkshire	Newbury, Reading, Wokingham, part of South Oxfordshire (Henley area)	Part of Berkshire District, Oxfordshire District 1993
Buckinghamshire	Aylesbury: renamed Aylesbury Vale 1982	Aylesbury Vale	Part of Buckinghamshire District 1993
Buckinghamshire	Milton Keynes	Milton Keynes	Part of Buckinghamshire District 1993
Buckinghamshire	Wycombe	Chiltern, Wycombe, part of South Bucks (Beaconsfield area)	Part of Buckinghamshire District 1993
Northamptonshire	Kettering	Corby, East Northamptonshire, Kettering, Wellingborough	Part of Northamptonshire District 1994
Northamptonshire	Northampton	Daventry, Northampton, South Northamptonshire	Part of Northamptonshire District 1994
Oxfordshire	Oxfordshire	Cherwell, Oxford, Vale of White Horse, West Oxfordshire, part of South Oxfordshire (Bullingdon, Thame and Wallingford areas)	

=== 1993–1996 ===
Reorganisation in 1993 led to a reduction in the number of districts to four:

District Health Authority	County	Area
Buckinghamshire	Buckinghamshire	Entire County
Berkshire	Berkshire	Entire County
Northamptonshire	Northamptonshire	Entire County
Oxfordshire	Oxfordshire	Entire County

In 1994 the Oxford Region was merged with the East Anglia Region to form Anglia and Oxford Region.

== Authorities in South Western Region ==
=== District Authorities created 1982 ===
Eight district health authorities were formed in the Wessex Region in 1982, replacing four Area Health Authorities:

AHA 1974–82	District Health Authority 1982	Local Government Areas	Changes
Avon	Bristol and Weston	Bath, Wansdyke, part of Woodspring (Axbridge and Weston-super-Mare areas), part of Bristol (Bedminster, Brislington, Clifton, Windmill Hill areas)	Part of Bristol and District 1991
Gloucestershire	Cheltenham and District	Cheltenham, part of Cotswold (Cirencester, Chipping Campden, Stow-on-the-Wold areas), most of Tewkesbury (except area formerly in Gloucester Rural District	Part of Gloucestershire District 1991
Cornwall and Isles of Scilly	Cornwall and Isles of Scilly	Cornwall and Isles of Scilly (Same area as AHA)	
Devon	Exeter	East Devon, Exeter, Mid Devon, part of West Devon (Okehampton area), part of Teignbridge (area formerly in St Thomas Rural District)	Part of Exeter and North Devon District 1993
Avon	Frenchay	Kingswood, part of Northavon (Chipping Sodbury area), part of Bristol (Easton, Eastville, St George areas)	Part of Bristol and District 1991
Gloucestershire	Gloucester	Forest of Dean, Gloucester, Stroud, part of Cotswold (Tetbury area)	Part of Gloucestershire District 1991
Devon	North Devon	North Devon, Torridge	Part of Exeter and North Devon District 1993
Devon	Plymouth	Plymouth, part of South Hams (Kingsbridge, Salcombe areas)	Part of Plymouth and Torbay District 1993
Somerset	Somerset	Somerset (entire county) Same area as AHA	
Avon	Southmead	Part of Bristol (Avonmouth, Henbury, Horfield, Redland, Southmead, Westbury-on-Trym areas), part of Northavon (Thornbury area), part of Woodspring (Clevedon and Portishead areas)	Part of Bristol and District 1991
Devon	Torbay	Torbay, part of Teignbridge (except part in Exeter District), part of South Hams (Dartmouth, Totnes areas)	Part of Plymouth and Torbay District 1993

=== 1993–1996 ===
Reorganisation in 1991 and 1993 led to a reduction in the number of districts to five:

District Health Authority	County	Area
Bristol and District	Avon	Entire County
Cornwall and Isles of Scilly	Cornwall, Isles of Scilly	Unchanged
Exeter and North Devon	Devon	Districts of East Devon, Exeter, Mid Devon, North Devon and Torridge; most of West Devon (except Tavistock areas); part of Teignbridge (the area formerly in St Thomas Rural District)
Gloucestershire	Gloucestershire	Entire County
Plymouth and Torbay	Devon	Districts of Plymouth, South Hams, and Torbay, part of Teignbridge (Ashburton, Buckfastleigh, Dawlish, urban districts and the urban and rural districts of Newton Abbot); part of West Devon (the former urban and rural districts of Tavistock)
Somerset	Somerset	Unchanged

In 1994 the South West Region was merged with the Wessex Region to form the South and West Region.

== Authorities in West Midlands Region ==
=== District Authorities created 1982 ===
Twenty-two district health authorities were formed in the West Midlands Region in 1982, replacing eleven Area Health Authorities:

AHA 1974–82	District Health Authority 1982	Changes	
Birmingham	Central Birmingham	Part of Birmingham (Edgbaston, Fox Hollies, Hall Green, Harborne, Quinton, Sparkbrook, Sparkhill areas)	Absorbed by South Birmingham District 1991
Birmingham	East Birmingham	Part of Birmingham (Acock's Green, Hodge Hill, Shard End, Sheldon, Small Heath, Washwood Heath, Yardley areas)	Absorbed by North Birmingham District 1994
Birmingham	North Birmingham	Part of Birmingham (Erdington, Kingsbury, Stockland Green, Sutton Coldfield areas)	Absorbed East Birmingham, West Birmingham Districts 1994
Birmingham	South Birmingham	Part of Birmingham (Bartley Green, Billesley, Bourneville, Brandwood, King's Norton, Longbridge, Moseley, Northfield, Selly Oak, and Weoley areas)	Absorbed Central Birmingham 1991
Birmingham	West Birmingham	Part of Birmingham (Aston, Handsworth, Kingstanding, Ladywood, Oscott, Perry Barr, Sandwell, Soho areas)	Absorbed by North Birmingham District 1994
Coventry	Coventry	Coventry (Same area as AHA)	
Dudley	Dudley	Dudley (Same areas as AHA)	
Hereford and Worcester	Bromsgrove and Redditch	Bromsgrove, Redditch	Part of North Worcestershire District 1992
Hereford and Worcester	Herefordshire	Hereford, South Herefordshire, part of Leominster (Kington, Leominster and Wigmore areas), part of Malvern Hills (Bromyard and Ledbury areas)	
Hereford and Worcester	Kidderminster and District	Wyre Forest, part of Leominster (Tenbury area), part of Wychavon (1 parish)	Part of North Worcestershire District 1992
Hereford and Worcester	Worcester and District	Worcester, part of Malvern Hills (Malvern, Martley, Upton upon Severn areas)	
Sandwell	Sandwell	Sandwell (Same area as AHA)	
Shropshire	Shropshire	Shropshire (Same area as AHA)	
Solihull	Solihull	Solihull (Same area as AHA)	
Staffordshire	Mid-Staffordshire	Cannock Chase, South Staffordshire, Stafford	Part of South Staffordshire District 1994
Staffordshire	North Staffordshire	Newcastle-under-Lyme, Staffordshire Moorlands, Stoke-on-Trent	
Staffordshire	South-East Staffordshire	East Staffordshire, Lichfield, Tamworth	Part of South Staffordshire District 1994
Walsall	Walsall	Walsall (Same area as AHA)	
Warwickshire	North Warwickshire	North Warwickshire, Nuneaton and Bedworth	Part of North East Warwickshire District 1991†
Warwickshire	Rugby	Rugby	Part of North East Warwickshire District 1991†
Warwickshire	South Warwickshire	Stratford-on-Avon, Warwick	Part of Warwickshire District 1993
Wolverhampton	Wolverhampton	Wolverhampton (Same area as AHA)	

† North East Warwickshire District merged with South Warwickshire District to form Warwickshire District in 1993.

=== 1991–1996 ===
Reorganisation in 1991 to 1993 led to a reduction in the number of districts to fifteen:

District Health Authority	County	Area
Coventry	West Midlands	Coventry (unchanged)
Dudley	West Midlands	Dudley (unchanged)
Herefordshire	Hereford and Worcester	(unchanged)
North Birmingham	West Midlands	Part of Birmingham (areas formerly in East Birmingham, North Birmingham, West Birmingham Districts)
North Staffordshire	Staffordshire	Newcastle-under-Lyme, Staffordshire Moorlands and Stoke-on-Trent
North Worcestershire	Hereford and Worcester	Districts of Bromsgrove, Redditch and Wyre Forest; part of Leominster (Tenbury area), one parish in Wychavon
Sandwell	West Midlands	Sandwell (unchanged)
Shropshire	Shropshire	Entire County (unchanged)
Solihull	West Midlands	Solihull (unchanged)
South Birmingham	West Midlands	Part of Birmingham (areas fortmerly in Central Birmingham, South Birmingham Districts)
South Staffordshire	Staffordshire	Cannock Chase, East Staffordshire, Lichfield South Staffordshire, Stafford, Tamworth
Walsall	West Midlands	Walsall (Unchanged)
Warwickshire	Warwickshire	Entire County
Wolverhampton	West Midlands	Wolverhampton (Unchanged)
Worcester and District	Hereford and Worcester	Unchanged

== Authorities in Mersey Region ==
=== District Authorities created 1982 ===
Ten district health authorities were formed in the Mersey Region in 1982, replacing six Area Health Authorities:

AHA 1974–82	District Health Authority 1982	Local Government Areas	Changes
Cheshire	Chester	Chester, part of Ellesmere Port and Neston (Ellesmere Port area)	
Cheshire	Crewe	Crewe and Nantwich, part of Congleton (Alsager, Middlewich and Sandbach areas), most of Vale Royal (all except part formerly in Runcorn Rural District)	Part of South and East Cheshire District 1993
Cheshire	Halton	Halton, part of Vale Royal (part of the area formerly in Runcorn Rural District)	Part of North Cheshire District 1993
Cheshire	Macclesfield	Macclesfield, part of Congleton (Congleton area)	Part of South and East Cheshire District 1993
Cheshire	Warrington	Warrington, part of Vale Royal (part of the area formerly in Runcorn Rural District)	part of North Cheshire District 1993
Cheshire, Wirral	Wirral	Wirral, part of Ellesmere Port and Neston (Neston area)	
St Helens and Knowsley	St Helens and Knowsley	St Helens, Knowsley (Same area as AHA)	
Liverpool	Liverpool	Liverpool (Same area as AHA)	
Sefton	North Sefton: renamed Southport and Formby	Part of Sefton (Southport, Formby areas)	Part of Sefton District 1993
Sefton	South Sefton (Merseyside)	Part of Sefton (Bootle, Crosby, Litherland areas)	Part of Sefton District 1993

=== 1993–1996 ===
Reorganisation in 1993 led to a reduction in the number of districts to seven:

District Health Authority	County	Area
Chester	Cheshire	Unchanged
Liverpool	Merseyside	Unchanged
North Cheshire	Halton and Warrington; part of Vale Royal (the part formerly in Runcorn Rural District)	
Sefton	Merseyside	Sefton
St Helens and Knowsley	Merseyside	Unchanged
South and East Cheshire	Cheshire	Congleton, Crewe and Nantwich and Macclesfield; Vale Royal (except part in North Cheshire)
Wirral	Cheshire, Merseyside	Unchanged

In 1994 the Mersey Region was merged with the North Western Region to form the North West Region.

== Authorities in North Western Region ==
=== District Authorities created 1982 ===
Nineteen district health authorities were formed in the North Western Region in 1982, replacing eleven Area Health Authorities:

AHA 1974–82	District Health Authority 1982	Local Government Areas	Changes
Bolton	Bolton	Bolton (Same area as AHA)	
Bury	Bury	Bury (Same area as AHA)	Part of Bury and Rochdale District 1994
Lancashire	Blackburn, Hyndburn and Ribble Valley	Blackburn, Hyndburn, Ribble Valley	Part of East Lancashire District 1994
Lancashire	Blackpool, Wyre and Fylde	Blackpool, Fylde, Wyre	Part of North West Lancashire District 1994
Lancashire	Burnley, Pendle and Rossendale	Burnley, Pendle, most of Rossendale (Bacup, Haslingden, Rawtenstall areas)	Part of East Lancashire District 1994
Lancashire	Chorley and South Ribble	Chorley, South Ribble	Part of South Lancashire District 1994
Lancashire	Lancaster	Lancaster	Part of Morecambe Bay District 1994
Lancashire	Preston	Preston	Part of North West Lancashire District 1994
Lancashire	West Lancashire	West Lancashire	Part of South Lancashire District 1994
Manchester	Central Manchester	Part of Manchester (Ardwick, Fallowfield, Gorton, Hulme, Levenshulme, Longsight, Moss Side, and Rusholme areas)	Part of Manchester District 1994
Manchester	North Manchester	Part of Manchester (Blackley, Cheetham, Crumpsall, Harpurhey, Moston, and Newton Heath areas)	Part of Manchester District 1994
Manchester	South Manchester	Part of Manchester (Baguley, Chorlton, Didsbury, Northenden, Whalley Range, Withington areas)	Part of Manchester District 1994
Oldham	Oldham	Oldham (same area as AHA)	Part of West Pennine District 1994
Rochdale, Lancashire	Rochdale	Rochdale, part Rossendale (Whitworth area)	Part of Bury and Rochdale District 1994
Salford	Salford	Salford (same area as AHA)	Part of Salford and Trafford District 1994
Stockport	Stockport	Stockport (same area as AHA)	
Tameside, Derbyshire	Tameside and Glossop	Tameside, part of High Peak (Glossop and Tintwistle areas)	Part of West Pennine District 1994
Trafford	Trafford	Trafford (same area as AHA)	Part of Salford and Trafford District 1994
Wigan	Wigan	Wigan (Same area as AHA)	

=== 1994–1996 ===
Reorganisation in 1994 led to a reduction in the number of districts to :

District Health Authority	County	Area
Bolton	Greater Manchester	Bolton (unchanged)
Bury and Rochdale	Greater Manchester, Lancashire	Bury, Rochdale, part Rossendale (Whitworth area)
East Lancashire	Lancashire	Blackburn, Burnley, Hyndburn, Ribble Valley, Pendle, most of Rossendale (Bacup, Haslingden, Rawtenstall areas)
Manchester	Greater Manchester	Manchester
Morecambe Bay	Lancashire, Cumbria	Barrow-in-Furness, Lancaster, South Lakeland
North West Lancashire	Lancashire	Blackpool, Fylde, Preston, Wyre
South Lancashire	Lancashire	Chorley, South Ribble, West Lancashire
Salford and Trafford	Greater Manchester	Salford, Trafford
Stockport	Greater Manchester	Unchanged
West Pennine	Greater Manchester, Derbyshire	Oldham, Tameside, part of High Peak (Glossop and Tintwistle areas)

In 1994 the North Western Region was merged with the Mersey Region to form the North West Region.

== Authorities in Wales ==
=== District Authorities created 1982 ===
Nine district health authorities were formed in Wales in 1982. There were no Area Health Authorities in Wales, the entire principality being under the jurisdiction of the Welsh Office.

County	District Health Authority 1982
Clwyd	Clwyd
Dyfed	East Dyfed
Dyfed	Pembrokeshire
Gwent	Gwent
Gwynedd	Gwynedd
Mid Glamorgan	Mid Glamorgan
Powys	Powys
South Glamorgan	South Glamorgan
West Glamorgan	West Glamorgan

== Sources ==
- The National Health Service (Determination of Districts) Order 1981 (1981 No. 1837)
- The National Health Service (Determination of Districts) Amendment Order 1982 (1982 No. 344)
- The National Health Service (Determination of Districts) Amendment Order 1985 (1985 No. 370)
- The National Health Service (Determination of Districts) Amendment Order 1988 (1988 No. 407)
- The National Health Service (Determination of Regions and Districts) Amendment Order 1990 (1990 No. 1755)
- The National Health Service (Determination of Districts) Order 1991 (1991 No. 326)
- The National Health Service (Determination of Districts) (No. 2) Order 1991 (1991 No. 2039)
- The National Health Service (Determination of Districts) Order 1992 (1992 No. 120)
- The National Health Service (Determination of Districts) (No. 2) Order 1992 (1992 No. 367)
- The National Health Service (Determination of Districts) (No. 3) Order 1992 (1992 No. 2163)
- The National Health Service (Determination of Districts) (No. 4) Order 1992 (1992 No. 2751)
- The National Health Service (Determination of Districts) Order 1993 (1993 No. 574)
- The National Health Service (Determination of Districts) (No. 2) Order 1993 (1993 No. 2219)
- The National Health Service (Determination of Districts) Order 1994 (1994 No. 681)
- The National Health Service (Determination of Districts) (No. 2) Order 1994 (1994 No. 1261)
- The National Health Service (Determination of Districts) (No. 3) Order 1994 (1994 No. 2289)
- The National Health Service (Determination of Districts) Order 1995 (1995 No. 562)
- The National Health Service (Determination of Districts) (No. 2) Order 1995 (1995 No. 533)
