= Ken Jarrold =

Kenneth Wesley Jarrold CBE (born 19 May 1948), is a British health service manager.

Jarrold was educated at St Lawrence College, Ramsgate, and Sidney Sussex College, Cambridge, where he gained a first-class degree in history. He was President of the Cambridge Union.

From December 2011 to March 2016 he was Chair of North Staffordshire Combined Healthcare NHS Trust. He was appointed chair of the Rebalancing Medicines Legislation and Pharmacy Regulation Programme Board in 2013.

He lives at Stockton on Tees and Newcastle upon Tyne.

He joined the NHS in 1969 as a National Administrative Trainee. He was a chief executive of district, regional and strategic health authorities for 19 years. He was a board member of the NHS Executive and spent three years at national level as the Director of Human Resources and Deputy to the Chief Executive of the NHS in England.

He has retired as the Chair of Cumbria, Northumberland, Tyne and Wear NHS Foundation Trust Council of Governors and Board of Directors.

== Publications ==
Other People's Shoes: 40 Questions for Leaders and Managers, CreateSpace Independent Publishing Platform, 2018 ISBN 1985879697
