= Health Services Act 1980 =

Act of the Parliament of the United Kingdom

Health Services Act 1980 (Note: Section 26(1).)
- Act of Parliament
- Parliament of the United Kingdom
- Long title: An Act to make further provision with respect to the health services in England, Wales and Scotland and their use by private patients and with respect to hospitals and nursing homes outside those services; to dissolve or make further provision with respect to certain bodies connected with or with persons providing services within those health services; and for connected purposes.
- Citation: 1980 c. 53
- Introduced by: Secretary of State for Social Services, Patrick Jenkin, 1979 (Commons)
- Territorial extent: England and Wales; Scotland; (Note: Section 26(4).)

Dates
- Royal assent: 8 August 1980
- Commencement: various (Note: Section 26(3)–(4).)

Other legislation
- Amends: Health Services Act 1976
- Amended by: Abortion Act 1967; Mental Health Act 1983; Public Health (Control of Disease) Act 1984; Registered Homes Act 1984; Road Traffic (Consequential Provisions) Act 1988; Statute Law (Repeals) Act 1989; Trade Union and Labour Relations (Consolidation) Act 1992; Health Service Commissioners Act 1993; Health and Social Care Act 2001; Statute Law (Repeals) Act 2004; Smoking, Health and Social Care (Scotland) Act 2005; National Health Service (Consequential Provisions) Act 2006

Status: Amended

Text of statute as originally enacted

Revised text of statute as amended

Text of the Health Services Act 1980 as in force today (including any amendments) within the United Kingdom, from legislation.gov.uk.

The Health Services Act 1980 (c. 53) is an act of the Parliament of the United Kingdom that reorganised the administration of the National Health Service in England and Wales. The Act abolished all area health authorities (AHAs) in 1982 and replaced them with 192 district health authorities (DHAs). It also repealed the provisions that had been introduced in the National Health Service Act 1977 which sought to remove paid private treatment from NHS hospitals.

== Background ==
A Royal Commission on the National Health Service was established in 1975 and published its report in July 1979. It heard complaints that the AHAs created under the National Health Service Reorganisation Act 1973 added an extra and unnecessary tier of management. Although the 1973 Act had established a two-tier system of AHAs and RHAs, there was, in effect, a third lower administrative tier as the work of hospital management was done at district general hospital level.

The 'Patients First' consultation document was published in December 1979 which largely agreed with recommendations made by the Royal Commission to reduce the number of administrative tiers.

== Effects ==
In 1982, the 90 AHAs were abolished and replaced by 192 DHAs under the Health Services Act 1980, but the RHAs remained. DHAs were established centred on district hospitals, and not necessarily aligned to local authority boundaries as the 90 AHAs had been.

Just as the AHAs had done, each DHA worked alongside a family practitioner committee (replaced by family health services authorities in 1990), which was responsible for managing primary care services such as general practice, pharmacy and dentistry.

The act also repealed the provisions relating to pay beds introduced under the previous Labour government in the National Health Service Act 1977.

== Subsequent reorganisations ==
Family practitioner committees were replaced by family health services authorities (FHSAs) under the National Health Service and Community Care Act 1990. The 1990 act also created NHS trusts and altered the roles of DHAs and local authorities to create an internal market.

The DHAs were reorganised on a number of occasions in the 1990s, and in 1996, new single-tier health authorities replaced both DHAs and FHSAs as a result of the Health Authorities Act 1995.
