= Area health authority =

Area health authorities in England and Wales (1974–1982)

Area health authorities (AHAs) were 90 National Health Service (NHS) administrative organisations set up in England and Wales in 1974 by the National Health Service Reorganisation Act 1973. Separate legislation was passed for Scotland. In England, they were responsible to an upper tier of regional health authorities (RHAs). In 1982, the AHAs were abolished and replaced by 192 smaller district health authorities but the RHAs remained. Both the district and regional health authorities were then themselves abolished in 1996 as a result of the Health Authorities Act 1995.

== History ==
In July 1968, the Minister of Health, Kenneth Robinson, published a green paper, Administrative structure of the medical and related services in England and Wales. It proposed creating about 50 single-tier area boards taking responsibility for all health functions in each local government area. It triggered years of debate about the relationship between the NHS, local authorities, and health and social care. In September 1968, the separate ministries of health and of social care merged to form the Department of Health and Social Security.

In 1970, Richard Crossman rewrote Robinson's 1968 proposals, publishing a second green paper. Crossman rejected local authorities managing the health service and instead proposed that area authorities should remain directly under the Department of Health and Social Security. He retained the idea that the number and areas of the proposed new health authorities should match those of the proposed new local authorities, but added regional health councils which could undertake those activities for which the local area boards were too small.

Following the election of the Conservative government of 1970, the new Secretary of State, Keith Joseph, amended Crossman’s 1970 proposals. Under these plans published in July 1971, the upper-tier regional health authorities would also be responsible for general planning and the allocation of resources to the lower-tier area health authorities, as well as the coordination and supervision of the latter’s activities. This two-tier health system was in keeping with the Conservative government's proposals for a two-tier system of local government.

After years of debate, reform was made under the NHS Reorganisation Act 1973 which came into effect on 1 April 1974. This was the first time the service had been reorganised since it was established in 1948. It ended the 1948 tripartite system of separate provision of hospital services under regional hospital boards, hospital management committees and boards of governors; family practitioner services under executive councils; and community health services (including health visiting, maternity services, vaccination and ambulance services) under local authorities. These organisations were replaced by one unitary structure of 90 area health authorities (AHAs) answering to 14 regional health authorities (RHAs) and, ultimately, to the Secretary of State for Social Services. AHAs were matched to local authority boundaries. Each AHA district centred on a district general hospital, with some AHAs multi-district and some single district. Responsibility for public health was also taken from local authorities and given to the secretary of state, who also took on responsibility for school health. In effect, there was also a third lower administrative tier as the work of hospital management was done at district general hospital level.

The 1973 Act also established several committees. Joint consultative committees were established to advise AHAs and local authorities on the performance of their duties under the Act. The Act also required AHAs to establish family practitioner committees responsible for general medical services (as well as dental, pharmaceutical and ophthalmic services). Community health council were established to give patients a voice into the system. A Health Service Ombudsman was established with powers to investigate NHS bodies.

The incoming Labour government of 1974 published a paper on Democracy in the NHS in May that added local government representatives to the new RHAs and increased their proportion on each AHA to a third.

A Royal Commission on the National Health Service published its report in 1979. It heard complaints that AHAs added an extra and unnecessary tier of management. In 1982, the AHAs were replaced by 192 district health authorities under the Health Services Act 1980, but the RHAs remained. Initially, there were 14 RHAs, but they were reduced in number to 8 in 1994 before being abolished altogether in 1996 and replaced by eight regional offices of the NHS Executive as a result of the Health Authorities Act 1995.

Organisational history of the National Health Service in England
National Government	Ministry of Health (1919–1968)	Department of Health and Social Security (1968–1988)		Department of Health (1988 –2018)			Department of Health and Social Care (2018–Present)
National Level				NHS Executive (1996–2002)		NHS England † (2011–Present)	
Regional Level	Regional Hospital Boards (1947–1974)	Regional Health Authorities (1974–1996)		NHS Executive Regional Offices (1996–2002)	Strategic Health Authorities (2002–2013)		
District Level		Area Health Authorities (1974–1982)	District Health Authorities (1982–1996)	Health Authorities (1996–2002)		Clinical Commissioning Groups (2013–2022)	Integrated Care Boards (2022–Present)
Local Level	Hospital Management Committees (1947–1974)			NHS Trusts (1990–Present)			

† Note that NHS England is due to be dissolved by 2027 and its functions absorbed into the Department of Health and Social Care with the anticipated introduction of the NHS Modernisation Bill into parliament in 2026.

== Membership ==
Membership of area health authorities:

- Chairman - appointed by the Secretary of State
- Fifteen members; sixteen in teaching areas.
- Four members representative of local authorities
- Others appointed by the regional health authority after consultation with universities associated with the region, bodies representative of the professions and any federation of workers' organisations.

== See also ==
- Health regions of Canada, which were generally established during the same era
