= NHS internal market =

Policy of competition in the English NHS

The NHS internal market was established by the National Health Service and Community Care Act 1990, to separate the roles of purchasers and providers within the National Health Service in the United Kingdom. Previously, healthcare was provided by regional health authorities which were given a budget to run hospitals and community health services (but not general practice) in their area. The Health and Social Care Act 2012 was intended to open up the internal market to external competition. The 2019 NHS Long Term Plan called for the establishment of integrated care systems across England by 2021, effectively ending the internal market.

== Establishment ==
Although the Thatcher government was slow to reform the NHS, following the 1983 Griffiths report, from 1988 it began to apply the principles of New Public Management vigorously across the welfare state. The plan was to decentralize decision making and introduce competition, with the state becoming a purchaser, rather than a provider, of welfare services.

The setting up of the market required the establishment of a system of Payment by Results and the formulation of a national NHS Tariff to complement the funding formula devised by the Resource Allocation Working Party. The Tariff includes a weighting system, the market forces factor, which pays providers in high-cost areas – principally in London – enhanced fees. In 2019 it was decided to reduce the London weighting.

The internal market initially established NHS trusts, in five annual waves, as separate bodies, splitting purchasers from providers. Until they became trusts the providing organisations were called directly managed units. The trusts had boards with non-executives, analogous to company boards, and business people were encouraged to serve on the boards. The Act also established GP Fundholding, a scheme whereby individual GP practices could take over the management of hospital services for their patients. Fundholding was abolished by the Labour Government in 1997/8. The Labour Party had campaigned against the internal market, but did not abolish it, though Tony Blair told the Labour Party conference in 1999 that the dreaded Tory internal market was finally banished for good. It introduced primary care groups, which were soon converted into primary care trusts—"thereby universalising fundholding while repudiating the concept."

Julian Le Grand was one of the chief proponents of quasi-markets influencing the Blair governments.

The fundamental concept was that patients would choose between different providers, money would follow the patients and so the best hospitals (there was never any choice of community health services) would prosper. It was never explained what would happen to the less successful institutions. As Kenneth Arrow explained in his famous 1963 paper, Uncertainty and the Welfare Economics of Medical Care "A competitive healthcare market is grounded in the expectation that some hospitals or surgeries will go bust". No hospitals did go bust, and only a minority of patients, mainly those needing elective surgery, were in a position to exercise choice between providers. Furthermore, as Arrow explained, "In practice, the theoretical advantages of choice are outweighed by the fact that people don't do a good job of making these choices in a competitive environment—it's almost impossible."

In lieu of commercial failure, health and social care service regulators were established, first the Commission for Health Improvement, which was replaced by the Healthcare Commission and then the Care Quality Commission.

== Cost ==
Opponents of the internal market have regularly claimed that the introduction of the internal market increased NHS administration costs from 5% to 14% of total expenditure. As a report from York University pointed out "There are no agreed definitions of 'administration' and 'management' in health care between (and sometimes even within) countries' health care systems." Nor is it clear which administrative functions are attributable to the market. Administrative costs in the NHS were generally thought to be lower than in other systems as there were no systems for billing patients, and indeed until the advent of the internal market there was little discussion of the costs of treatments. The number and cost of managers, administrative and clerical staff certainly increased significantly between 1988 and 1992, but Full Fact concluded that "No-one knows the exact cost or benefit of the NHS internal market in England".

== Reform ==
The reforms introduced in 2017 by Simon Stevens are regarded as the official abandonment of the policy of competition in the English NHS, the establishment of integrated care systems effectively ending the purchaser-provider split, although there has not yet been any legislative acknowledgment of the change in policy. In February 2019, NHS England called for the repeal of the regulations made under section 75 of the Health and Social Care Act 2012 which require competitive tendering.

From March 2019, with the effective merger of NHS Improvement and NHS England, there was no longer any real purchaser/provider split at a national level.

The move away from Payment by Results, which started in 2019, further undermines the principles of the internal market, as it is intended to reduce incentives for increases in hospital activity.

Karen James, chief executive of Tameside and Glossop Integrated Care NHS Foundation Trust, said in July 2020 that the NHS should aim to permanently scrap activity-based payment tariffs for acute care because block contracts – in which trusts are paid a set level of income – had encouraged "the right behaviours" in Greater Manchester during the COVID-19 pandemic in England.

In the financial allocations to local systems covering the second half of 2020–21, incentives and penalties depend solely on system-level performance, not performance of individual organisations.

The Department of Health and Social Care launched a consultation on a proposed new 'provider selection regime' in 2022. This took effect with the passing of the Health and Care Act 2022. NHS commissioners are longer automatically obliged to put clinical services out to tender.
