= Tribunals and Inquiries Act 1992 =

Act of the Parliament of the United Kingdom

Tribunals and Inquiries Act 1992 (Note: Section 19(1).)
- Act of Parliament
- Parliament of the United Kingdom
- Long title: An Act to consolidate the Tribunals and Inquiries Act 1971 and certain other enactments relating to tribunals and inquiries.
- Citation: 1992 c. 53
- Territorial extent: United Kingdom (Note: Section 19(3).)

Dates
- Royal assent: 16 July 1992
- Commencement: 1 October 1992 (Note: Section 19(2).)

Other legislation
- Amends: Legal Aid (Scotland) Act 1986; Social Security Administration Act 1992; See § Repealed enactments
- Repeals/revokes: See § Repealed enactments
- Amended by: Value Added Tax Act 1994; Planning (Consequential Provisions) (Scotland) Act 1997; Statute Law (Repeals) Act 1998; Local Government Act 2000; Freedom of Information Act 2000; Commonhold and Leasehold Reform Act 2002; Government of Wales Act 2006; National Health Service (Consequential Provisions) Act 2006; Tribunals, Courts and Enforcement Act 2007; Northern Ireland Act 2009; Scotland Act 2016

Status: Amended

Text of statute as originally enacted

Revised text of statute as amended

Text of the Tribunals and Inquiries Act 1992 as in force today (including any amendments) within the United Kingdom, from legislation.gov.uk.

The Tribunals and Inquiries Act 1992 (c. 53) is an act of the Parliament of the United Kingdom in the United Kingdom which sets out the powers and functions of the Council on Tribunals.

== Provisions ==
=== Repealed enactments ===
Section 18(2) of the act repealed 50 enactments and revoked 8 instruments, listed in parts I and II of schedule 4 to the act, respectively.

Part I – Enactments repealed by section 18(2)
Citation	Short title	Extent of repeal
1971 c. 62	Tribunals and Inquiries Act 1971	The whole act.
1972 c. 11	Superannuation Act 1972	In Schedule 6, paragraph 91.
1972 c. 58	National Health Service (Scotland) Act 1972	In Schedule 6, paragraph 152.
1973 c. 32	National Health Service Reorganisation Act 1973	In Schedule 4, paragraph 134.
1973 c. 38	Social Security Act 1973	Section 66(4) and (9).
1974 c. 39	Consumer Credit Act 1974	Sections 3 and 42.
1975 c. 18	Social Security (Consequential Provisions) Act 1975	In Schedule 2, paragraph 46.
1975 c. 68	Industry Act 1975	In Schedule 3, paragraph 10.
1976 c. 35	Police Pensions Act 1976	In Schedule 2, paragraph 9.
1977 c. 3	Aircraft and Shipbuilding Industries Act 1977	Section 42(10).
1977 c. 49	National Health Service Act 1977	In Schedule 15, paragraph 53.
1978 c. 23	Judicature (Northern Ireland) Act 1978	In Schedule 5, in Part II, the entry relating to the Tribunals and Inquiries Act 1971.
1978 c. 29	National Health Service (Scotland) Act 1978	In Schedule 16, paragraph 35.
1978 c. 44	Employment Protection (Consolidation) Act 1978	In Schedule 16, paragraph 11.
1979 c. 38	Estate Agents Act 1979	Section 24(1).
1980 c. 20	Education Act 1980	Section 7(6).
1980 c. 44	Education (Scotland) Act 1980	Section 28E(7).
1981 c. 54	Supreme Court Act 1981	In Schedule 5, the entry relating to the Tribunals and Inquiries Act 1971.
1982 c. 10	Industrial Training Act 1982	In Schedule 3, paragraph 2.
1982 c. 16	Civil Aviation Act 1982	Section 7(3).
1982 c. 45	Civic Government (Scotland) Act 1982	Section 18(11).
1983 c. 20	Mental Health Act 1983	In Schedule 4, paragraph 29.
1983 c. 41	Health and Social Services and Social Security Adjudications Act 1983	In Schedule 9, in Part I, paragraphs 10, 11 and 15.
1984 c. 23	Registered Homes Act 1984	In Schedule 1, paragraph 5.
1984 c. 31	Rating and Valuation (Amendment) (Scotland) Act 1984	In Schedule 2, paragraph 12.
1984 c. 35	Data Protection Act 1984	In Schedule 2, paragraph 13.
1985 c. 17	Reserve Forces (Safeguard of Employment) Act 1985	In Schedule 4, paragraph 3.
1985 c. 65	Insolvency Act 1985	In Schedule 1, paragraph 5.
1985 c. 67	Transport Act 1985	In Schedule 2, in Part II, paragraph 2. In Schedule 7, paragraph 15.
1986 c. 5	Agricultural Holdings Act 1986	In Schedule 14, paragraph 49.
1986 c. 39	Patents, Designs and Marks Act 1986	In Schedule 2, in Part I, paragraph 1(2)(d).
1986 c. 45	Insolvency Act 1986	In Schedule 14, the entry relating to the Tribunals and Inquiries Act 1971.
1986 c. 53	Building Societies Act 1986	In section 48(3), the words "after consultation with the Council on Tribunals".
1986 c. 60	Financial Services Act 1986	In Schedule 6, paragraph 6.
1987 c. 22	Banking Act 1987	In section 30, in subsection (3), the words "after consultation with the Council on Tribunals" and, in subsection (4), the words from "after consultation" onwards. In Schedule 6, paragraph 4.
1988 c. 33	Criminal Justice Act 1988	In Schedule 15, paragraph 37.
1988 c. 40	Education Reform Act 1988	In Schedule 12, in Part I, paragraph 12.
1988 c. 41	Local Government Finance Act 1988	In Schedule 12, in Part III, paragraph 41.
1988 c. 48	Copyright, Designs and Patents Act 1988	In Schedule 7, paragraph 14.
1989 c. 39	Self-Governing Schools etc. (Scotland) Act 1989	In Schedule 10, paragraph 4.
1989 c. 41	Children Act 1989	In Schedule 13, paragraph 30.
1990 c. 16	Food Safety Act 1990	In Schedule 3, paragraph 14.
1990 c. 27	Social Security Act 1990	Section 12(2).
1990 c. 41	Courts and Legal Services Act 1990	In Schedule 18, paragraph 2.
1991 c. 21	Disability Living Allowance and Disability Working Allowance Act 1991	In Schedule 2, paragraph 2(1).
1991 c. 40	Road Traffic Act 1991	In Schedule 7, paragraph 1.
1991 c. 48	Child Support Act 1991	In Schedule 5, paragraph 1.
1992 c. 6	Social Security (Consequential Provisions) Act 1992	In Schedule 2, paragraphs 8 and 9.
1992 c. 14	Local Government Finance Act 1992	In Schedule 13, paragraph 31.
1992 c. 38	Education (Schools) Act 1992	In Schedule 4, paragraphs 2 and 3.

Part II – Instruments revoked by section 18(2)
Citation	Title
SI 1972/1210	Tribunals and Inquiries (Value Added Tax Tribunals) Order 1972
SI 1974/1478	Tribunals and Inquiries (Industrial Training Levy Exemption Referees) Order 1974
SI 1974/1964	Tribunals and Inquiries (Misuse of Drugs Tribunals) Order 1974
SI 1975/1404	Tribunals and Inquiries (Valuation Appeal Committees) Order 1975
SI 1979/659	Tribunals and Inquiries (Vaccine Damage Tribunals) Order 1979
SI 1984/1094	Tribunals and Inquiries (Dairy Produce Quota Tribunals) Order 1984
SI 1984/1247	Tribunals and Inquiries (Foreign Compensation Commission) Order 1984
SI 1991/2699	Tribunals and Inquiries (Specified Tribunals) Order 1991
