= National Health Service and Community Care Act 1990 =

Act of the Parliament of the United Kingdom

National Health Service and Community Care Act 1990 (Note: Section 67(1).)
- Act of Parliament
- Parliament of the United Kingdom
- Long title: An Act to make further provision about health authorities and other bodies constituted in accordance with the National Health Service Act 1977; to provide for the establishment of National Health Service trusts; to make further provision about the financing of the practices of medical practitioners; to amend Part VII of the Local Government (Scotland) Act 1973 and Part III of the Local Government Finance Act 1982; to amend the National Health Service Act 1977 and the National Health Service (Scotland) Act 1978; to amend Part VIII of the Mental Health (Scotland) Act 1984; to make further provision concerning the provision of accommodation and other welfare services by local authorities and the powers of the Secretary of State as respects the social services functions of such authorities; to make provision for and in connection with the establishment of a Clinical Standards Advisory Group; to repeal the Health Services Act 1976; and for connected purposes.
- Citation: 1990 c. 19
- Territorial extent: England and Wales; Scotland (in part); Northern Ireland (in part); (Note: Section 67(4)–(6).)

Dates
- Royal assent: 29 June 1990
- Commencement: various (Note: Section 67(2).)
Other legislation
Amends	Abortion Act 1967; Employers' Liability (Compulsory Insurance) Act 1969; House of Commons Disqualification Act 1975; Employment Protection (Consolidation) Act 1978
Repeals/revokes	Health Services Act 1976
Amended by	Social Security (Consequential Provisions) Act 1992; Health Service Commissioners Act 1993; Vehicle Excise and Registration Act 1994; Value Added Tax Act 1994; Employment Tribunals Act 1996; Employment Rights Act 1996; Education Act 1996; Planning (Consequential Provisions) (Scotland) Act 1997; Audit Commission Act 1998; Health and Social Care Act 2001; Human Tissue Act 2004; Smoking, Health and Social Care (Scotland) Act 2005; National Health Service (Consequential Provisions) Act 2006

Status: Amended

Text of statute as originally enacted

Revised text of statute as amended

Text of the National Health Service and Community Care Act 1990 as in force today (including any amendments) within the United Kingdom, from legislation.gov.uk.

The National Health Service and Community Care Act 1990 (c. 19) is an act of the Parliament of the United Kingdom that introduced an internal market into the supply of healthcare in the United Kingdom, making the state an 'enabler' rather than a supplier of health and social care provision.

== Provisions ==
The act states that it is a duty for local authorities to assess people for social care and support to ensure that people who need community care services or other types of support get the services they are entitled to. Patients have their needs and circumstances assessed and the results determine whether or not care or social services will be provided. This also ensures that the people giving the care follow a certain set of rules called the care value base. Local authority resources can be taken into account during the assessment process, but if it is deemed that services are required, those services must be provided by law: services cannot be withdrawn at a later date if resources become limited.

The Act also split the role of district health authorities and local authorities by changing their internal structure, so that local authority departments assess the needs of the local population and then purchase the necessary services from 'providers'. To become 'providers' in the internal market, health organisations became NHS trusts, competing with each other. Community care ensures that people in need of long-term care are now able to live either in their own home, with adequate support, or in a residential home setting.

It established GP Fundholding.

Finally, the Act made provision for the establishment of family health services authorities in place of family practitioner committees and for the establishment of NHS trusts.

== See also ==
- Health Services Act 1980
- Care Act 2014
- Care programme approach
- National Health Service Act 1977 (c 49)
- National Health Service Act 2006 (c 41)
