= Hospital management committee =

British hospital management organisation

Hospital Management Committees (HMCs) were established as the main instrument for the local management of hospital services of the National Health Service (NHS) in England and Wales under the National Health Service Act 1946.

There were originally 377 committees which were answerable to the 14 regional hospital boards. Each HMC was responsible for a group of around 10 functionally-related or locally grouped hospitals. The aim was that each hospital group should be able to provide all services which would be available at a large general hospital, and might therefore consist of, for example, a former voluntary general hospital, a municipal general hospital, a maternity home, an isolation hospital, as well as several other smaller hospitals. The service was planned so that patients could be treated in the hospital best suited to their medical needs. Mental hospitals were grouped under their own HMCs. The 36 large teaching hospitals were outside this structure; they maintained their own endowment funds and their old boards of governors, who reported directly to the Minister for Health, rather than a Regional Hospital Board.

The National Health Service Reorganisation Act 1973 replaced the system of Regional Hospital Boards and Hospital Management Committees with regional health authorities in 1974.

Organisational history of the National Health Service in England
National Government	Ministry of Health (1919–1968)	Department of Health and Social Security (1968–1988)		Department of Health (1988 –2018)			Department of Health and Social Care (2018–Present)
National Level				NHS Executive (1996–2002)		NHS England † (2011–Present)	
Regional Level	Regional Hospital Boards (1947–1974)	Regional Health Authorities (1974–1996)		NHS Executive Regional Offices (1996–2002)	Strategic Health Authorities (2002–2013)		
District Level		Area Health Authorities (1974–1982)	District Health Authorities (1982–1996)	Health Authorities (1996–2002)		Clinical Commissioning Groups (2013–2022)	Integrated Care Boards (2022–Present)
Local Level	Hospital Management Committees (1947–1974)			NHS Trusts (1990–Present)			

† Note that NHS England is due to be dissolved by 2027 and its functions absorbed into the Department of Health and Social Care with the anticipated introduction of the NHS Modernisation Bill into parliament in 2026.(Hospital Management Committees as created under the National Health Service Act should not be confused with the management committees which governed many individual hospitals prior to the creation of the NHS, particularly following the transfer of former workhouse infirmaries to local councils under the provisions of the Local Government Act 1929 by which boards of guardians were abolished. Aneurin Bevan, who introduced the National Health Service in 1948, was a member of the Tredegar Cottage Hospital management committee around 1928 and was chairman in 1929/30; under the NHS, Tredegar Hospital came under the management of the Rhymney and Sirhowy Valley Hospital Management Committee.)
