= Food Safety Act 1990 =

Act of the Parliament of the United Kingdom

Food Safety Act 1990 (Note: Section 60(1).)
- Act of Parliament
- Parliament of the United Kingdom
- Long title: An Act to make new provision in place of the Food Act 1984 (except Parts III and V), the Food and Drugs (Scotland) Act 1956 and certain other enactments relating to food; to amend Parts III and V of the said Act of 1984 and Part I of the Food and Environment Protection Act 1985; and for connected purposes.
- Citation: 1990 c. 16
- Territorial extent: England and Wales; Scotland; Northern Ireland (in part); (Note: Section 60(5).)

Dates
- Royal assent: 29 June 1990
- Commencement: various (Note: Section 60(2)–(4).)
Other legislation
Amends	Water (Scotland) Act 1980; Public Health (Control of Disease) Act 1984; See § Repealed enactments
Repeals/revokes	See § Repealed enactments
Amended by	Water Consolidation (Consequential Provisions) Act 1991; Tribunals and Inquiries Act 1992; Tin in Food Regulations 1992; Local Government (Wales) Act 1994; Petroleum Act 1998; Food Safety (Fishery Products and Live Shellfish) (Hygiene) Regulations 1998; Food Standards Act 1999; Water Industry (Scotland) Act 2002; Ministry of Agriculture, Fisheries and Food (Dissolution) Order 2002; Kava-kava in Food (Wales) Regulations 2002; Statute Law (Repeals) Act 2004; Food Safety Act 1990 (Amendment) Regulations 2004; General Food Regulations 2004; Water Act 2003 (Consequential and Supplementary Provisions) Regulations 2005; Quick-frozen Foodstuffs (England) Regulations 2007; Public Health etc. (Scotland) Act 2008; Food Irradiation (Scotland) Regulations 2009; Deregulation Act 2015; Food (Scotland) Act 2015; Water Act 2014 (Consequential Amendments etc.) Order 2017

Status: Amended

Text of statute as originally enacted

Revised text of statute as amended

Text of the Food Safety Act 1990 as in force today (including any amendments) within the United Kingdom, from legislation.gov.uk.

The Food Safety Act 1990 (c. 16) is an act of the Parliament of the United Kingdom. It is the statutory obligation to treat food intended for human consumption in a controlled and managed way.

The key requirements of the act are that food must comply with food safety requirements, must be "of the nature, substance and quality demanded", and must be correctly described (labelled).

== Provisions ==
=== Repealed enactments ===
Section 59(4) of the act repealed 21 enactments, listed in schedule 5 to the act.

Citation	Short title	Extent of repeal
4 & 5 Geo. 5. c. 46	Milk and Dairies (Scotland) Act 1914	The whole act.
12 & 13 Geo. 5. c. 54	Milk and Dairies (Amendment) Act 1922	The whole act.
24 & 25 Geo. 5. c. 51	Milk Act 1934	The whole act.
12, 13 & 14 Geo. 6. c. 34	Milk (Special Designations) Act 1949	The whole act.
4 & 5 Eliz. 2. c. 30	Food and Drugs (Scotland) Act 1956	The whole act.
1963 c. 33	London Government Act 1963	Section 54(1).
1967 c. 22	Agriculture Act 1967	In section 7(3), the words from "and, without prejudice" to the end.
1967 c. 50	Farm and Garden Chemicals Act 1967	In section 4(7)(c), the words from "for the reference" to "1956".
1968 c. 29	Trade Descriptions Act 1968	In section 22(2), the paragraph beginning with the words "In this subsection".
1968 c. 67	Medicines Act 1968	In section 132(1), the definition of "food and drugs authority". In Schedule 5, paragraph 17.
1968 c. 73	Transport Act 1968	In Schedule 16, in paragraph 7(2), paragraphs (d) and (e).
1971 c. 62	Tribunals and Inquiries Act 1971	In Schedule 1, paragraphs 15 and 40.
1972 c. 66	Agriculture (Miscellaneous Provisions) Act 1972	Section 4(3).
1972 c. 68	European Communities Act 1972	In Schedule 4, paragraph 3(2)(c).
1976 c. 77	Weights and Measures &c. Act 1976	In section 12(9)(c), the words "the 1956 Act or".
1977 c. 28	Control of Food Premises (Scotland) Act 1977	The whole act.
1983 c. 37	Importation of Milk Act 1983	The whole act.
1984 c. 30	Food Act 1984	Parts I and II. In section 51(2), the word "market". In section 53, in subsection (1) the words "and in respect of the weighing and measuring of articles and vehicles", and in subsection (3)(b) the words "in respect of the weighing of vehicles, or as the case may be," Section 57(1). Section 58. In section 61, the words from "and this Part" to the end. Part IV. Sections 70 to 92. In section 93, in subsection (2), paragraphs (b) to (d) and, in subsection (3), paragraphs (a) to (e) and (h) to (l). In section 94, subsection (1) except as regards offences under Part III of the Act, and subsection (2). In section 95, subsections (2) to (8). Sections 96 to 109. Sections 111 to 120. In section 121, subsections (2) and (3). Sections 122 to 131. In section 132, subsection (1) except the words "In this Act, unless the context otherwise requires" and the definitions of "animal" and "the Minister". Sections 133 and 134. In section 136, in subsection (2), paragraphs (b) and (c). Schedules 1 to 11.
1985 c. 48	Food and Environment Protection Act 1985	In section 1(2), the definition of "escape". In section 24(1), the definition of "escape".
1985 c. 51	Local Government Act 1985	In Schedule 8, paragraph 15(2).
1985 c. 72	Weights and Measures Act 1985	Section 38(4).

== See also ==
- Food Standards Agency
- Public analyst
