= Resource Allocation Working Party =

The Resource Allocation Working Party was a group set up within the National Health Service in England in 1975 to suggest a mechanism whereby resources for secondary care could be matched to need (Gatrell, 2002).

== Background ==
Between 1948 and 1968 NHS financial allocations were essentially based on sequential inflation uplifts. A Regional Health Authority or Teaching Hospital could argue for an increase. The richer parts of the country had better funding in 1948 than the more deprived areas and so the differences between the various regions widened over time. In 1976-1977 there was an almost 30% difference in the revenue allocation between the 14 regions, with the North West having the least and North-East Thames region the most per head of population.

Richard Crossman developed a formula based on population, beds and cases but its fundamental problem was that the formula was partly based on utilisation and current resources. Since utilisation depends on availability of resources which were unequally distributed it could not rectify the problem. When Barbara Castle was Secretary of State for Health in 1972, the problem of regional resource inequality was addressed again. Her Special Adviser Professor Brian Abel-Smith had a particular interest in this problem (on which he had already advised Crossman, whose Special Adviser he had been earlier). He chaired the Advisory Committee to the Social Medicine and Health Services Research Unit at St Thomas' Hospital. He drew the attention of the Committee to the problems of resource allocation and encouraged them to consider possible research to rectify this unacceptable situation. They produced a proposal for a complicated randomised controlled trial of different funding formulae, but the Minister, David Owen, rejected it as interesting but politically impossible.

Owen established the Resource Allocation Working Party (RAWP), to examine the possibilities of a better funding formula. It came to the conclusion that Standardised Mortality Ratios were a reasonable indicator of regional variations in health care needs in the acute sector. The Report of the Working Party also emphasised the need to develop and apply positive preventive measures such as promoting changes in smoking habits and improving the environments in which people live and work.

The Royal Commission on the National Health Service drew attention to the inequalities of funding. Expenditure on NHS services in Scotland was £127.10 per head of population, in the NW Thames region £122.38, in the West Midlands £91.52.

The four Metropolitan Thames Regional Health Authorities and most of the London Teaching Hospitals were disadvantaged by, and unhappy about, the new formula. The simplicity and transparency of the formula made it difficult for politicians to manipulate. The idea that mortality should be used to influence the distribution of health resources was questioned on the grounds that most health care is provided for people who do not die. The formula devised by the Resource Allocation Working Party survived until 1989 and did reduce the funding gap between the Northern regions and London. It was replaced by a more complex formula announced in the publication of Working for Patients in 1989, and there have since been further changes and debate, particularly about the relative weighting to be given to old age, which favours more prosperous Southern areas, and deprivation which favours poorer Northern areas.

== See also ==
Barnett Formula
