= Residential Homes Act 1980 =

Act of the Parliament of the United Kingdom

Residential Homes Act 1980 (Note: Section 12(1).)
- Act of Parliament
- Parliament of the United Kingdom
- Long title: An Act to consolidate certain enactments relating to the registration, inspection and conduct of residential homes for disabled, old or mentally disordered persons and to the provision by district councils of meals and recreation for old people.
- Citation: 1980 c. 7
- Territorial extent: England and Wales (Note: Section 12(3).)

Dates
- Royal assent: 20 March 1980
- Commencement: 1 August 1980 (Note: Section 12(2). The Residential Homes Act 1980 (Commencement) Order 1980 (SI 1980/947).)
- Repealed: 1 January 1984 (section 8) (Note: The Health and Social Services and Social Security Adjudications Act 1983 (Commencement No. 1) Order 1983 (SI 1983/974).); 1 January 1985 (rest of act) (Note: The Health and Social Services and Social Security Adjudications Act 1983 (Commencement No. 5) Order 1984 (SI 1984/1347).)
Other legislation
Repealed by	Health and Social Services and Social Security Adjudications Act 1983

Status: Repealed

Text of statute as originally enacted

The Residential Homes Act 1980 (c. 7) was an act of the Parliament of the United Kingdom that consolidated certain enactments relating to the registration, inspection and conduct of residential homes for disabled, old or mentally disordered persons, and to the provision by district councils of meals and recreation for old people, in England and Wales.

== Provisions ==
=== Repealed enactments ===
Section 11(5) of the act repealed 8 enactments, listed in schedule 2 to the act.

Enactments repealed by section 11
Citation	Short title	Extent of repeal
11 & 12 Geo. 6. c. 29	National Assistance Act 1948	Section 31. In section 33(1), the proviso. Sections 37 to 40.
7 & 8 Eliz. 2. c. 72	Mental Health Act 1959	Sections 19 to 21. Section 23(1). In Schedule 7, in Part II, the entry relating to section 37 of the National Assistance Act 1948.
8 & 9 Eliz. 2. c. 61	Mental Health (Scotland) Act 1960	In Schedule 4, the entry relating to section 37 of the National Assistance Act 1948.
10 & 11 Eliz. 2. c. 24	National Assistance Act 1948 (Amendment) Act 1962	Section 1(1).
1968 c. 46	Health Services and Public Health Act 1968	Section 45(10).
1972 c. 70	Local Government Act 1972	In Schedule 23, paragraph 2(8).
1975 c. 37	Nursing Homes Act 1975	In Schedule 1, paragraph 6.
1977 c. 45	Criminal Law Act 1977	In Schedule 6, the entries relating to sections 37(1) and 40(3) of the National Assistance Act 1948 and the entry relating to section 20(2) of the Mental Health Act 1959.

== Subsequent developments ==
The whole act was repealed by section 30(1) of, and part I of schedule 10 to, the Health and Social Services and Social Security Adjudications Act 1983; section 8 was repealed on 1 January 1984 and the remainder on 1 January 1985.
