= Health Authorities Act 1995 =

Act of the Parliament of the United Kingdom

Health Authorities Act 1995 (Note: Section 10.)
- Act of Parliament
- Parliament of the United Kingdom
- Long title: An Act to abolish Regional Health Authorities, District Health Authorities and Family Health Services Authorities, require the establishment of Health Authorities and make provision in relation to Health Authorities and Special Health Authorities and for connected purposes.
- Citation: 1995 c. 17
- Introduced by: Secretary of State for Health, Virginia Bottomley, 1994 (Commons)
- Territorial extent: England and Wales (Note: Section 11.)

Dates
- Royal assent: 28 June 1995
- Commencement: from 1 April 1996 (Note: Section 8.)
Other legislation
Amends	Polish Resettlement Act 1947; House of Commons Disqualification Act 1975; Supplementary Benefits Act 1976; Public Health (Control of Disease) Act 1984; Opticians Act 1989; Water Industry Act 1991; Health Service Commissioners Act 1993; Value Added Tax Act 1994
Amended by	Employment Tribunals Act 1996; Employment Rights Act 1996; Education Act 1996; Audit Commission Act 1998; Statute Law (Repeals) Act 2004; Human Tissue Act 2004; National Health Service (Consequential Provisions) Act 2006; Mental Health Act 2007

Status: Amended

Text of statute as originally enacted

Revised text of statute as amended

Text of the Health Authorities Act 1995 as in force today (including any amendments) within the United Kingdom, from legislation.gov.uk.

The Health Authorities Act 1995 (c. 17) is an act of the Parliament of the United Kingdom that reorganised the administration of the National Health Service in England and Wales.

The act followed the introduction of an internal market within the NHS under the National Health Service and Community Care Act 1990.

The act abolished the regional health authorities (RHAs), district health authorities (DHAs) and family health services authorities (FHSAs) established under the National Health Service Reorganisation Act 1973 and Health Services Act 1980. The RHAs were replaced by eight regional offices of the NHS Executive, and the functions of the DHAs and FHSAs were effectively merged and taken up by new health authorities.

These reforms lasted until the next major reorganisation of the NHS under the National Health Service Reform and Health Care Professions Act 2002. The 2002 Act abolished HAs and transferred most of their responsibilities to primary care trusts. It also created a system of strategic health authorities.
