= Registered Homes Act 1984 =

Act of the Parliament of the United Kingdom

Registered Homes Act 1984 (Note: Section 59(1).)
- Act of Parliament
- Parliament of the United Kingdom
- Long title: An Act to consolidate certain enactments relating to residential care homes and nursing homes and Registered Homes Tribunals, with amendments to give effect to recommendations of the Law Commission.
- Citation: 1984 c. 23
- Territorial extent: England and Wales (Note: Section 58(1).)

Dates
- Royal assent: 26 June 1984
- Commencement: 1 January 1985 (Note: Registered Homes Act 1984 (Commencement) Order 1984 (SI 1984/1348).)
- Repealed: 1 April 2002 (Note: The Care Standards Act 2000 (Commencement No. 9 (England) and Transitional and Savings Provisions) Order 2001 (SI 2001/3852) and Care Standards Act 2000 (Commencement No. 8 (Wales) and Transitional, Savings and Consequential Provisions) Order 2002 (SI 2002/920).)

Other legislation
- Amends: See § Repealed enactments
- Repeals/revokes: See § Repealed enactments
- Amended by: Registered Homes (Amendment) Act 1991; Tribunals and Inquiries Act 1992; Statute Law (Repeals) Act 1993
- Repealed by: Care Standards Act 2000

Status: Repealed

Text of statute as originally enacted

Revised text of statute as amended

The Registered Homes Act 1984 (1984 c. 23) was an act of the Parliament of the United Kingdom that consolidated enactments relating to residential care homes, nursing homes, and Registered Homes Tribunals in England and Wales.

== Provisions ==
=== Repealed enactments ===
Section 57(3) of the act repealed 9 enactments, listed in schedule 3 to the act.

| Citation | Short title | Extent of repeal |
|---|---|---|
| 1975 c. 37 | Nursing Homes Act 1975 | The whole act. |
| 1976 c. 83 | Health Services Act 1976 | Section 19(1), (2) and (4). |
| 1977 c. 45 | Criminal Law Act 1977 | In Schedule 6, the entry relating to the Nursing Homes Act 1975. |
| 1977 c. 49 | National Health Service Act 1977 | In Schedule 15, paragraph 66. |
| 1979 c. 36 | Nurses, Midwives and Health Visitors Act 1979 | In Schedule 7, paragraph 23. |
| 1980 c. 53 | Health Services Act 1980 | In section 16, the words "nursing homes, mental nursing homes and". In Schedule 1, paragraph 27. In Schedule 4, Part I. |
| 1982 c. 51 | Mental Health (Amendment) Act 1982 | Section 63(2). |
| 1983 c. 20 | Mental Health Act 1983 | Section 120(5). In Schedule 4, paragraph 43. |
| 1983 c. 41 | Health and Social Services and Social Security Adjudications Act 1983 | In section 11, subsection (1), in subsection (2), the words "the Nursing Homes Act 1975, ", and subsection (3). In Schedule 4, Part I, in Part II paragraphs 24 to 37 and 44, and Part III. In Schedule 9, paragraphs 4, 6, 9, 12 to 14 and 26. |

== Subsequent developments ==
The act was amended by the Registered Homes (Amendment) Act 1991. The whole act was repealed by section 117(2) of, and schedule 6 to, the Care Standards Act 2000, which came into force on 1 April 2002.
