= Nursing Homes Act 1975 =

Act of the Parliament of the United Kingdom

Nursing Homes Act 1975 (Note: Section 24(1).)
- Act of Parliament
- Parliament of the United Kingdom
- Long title: An Act to consolidate certain enactments relating to nursing homes.
- Citation: 1975 c. 37
- Territorial extent: England and Wales (Note: Section 23(1).)

Dates
- Royal assent: 3 July 1975
- Commencement: 18 August 1975 (Note: Section 24(2). The Nursing Homes Act 1975 Commencement Order 1975.)
- Repealed: 1 January 1985
Other legislation
| Amends | See § Repealed enactments |
| Repeals/revokes | See § Repealed enactments |
| Amended by | Child Care Act 1980; Residential Homes Act 1980 |
| Repealed by | Registered Homes Act 1984 |

Status: Repealed

Text of statute as originally enacted

The Nursing Homes Act 1975 (c. 37) was an act of the Parliament of the United Kingdom that consolidated certain enactments relating to nursing homes in their application to England and Wales.

== Provisions ==
=== Repealed enactments ===
Section 22(3) of the act repealed 7 enactments, listed in schedule 3 to the act.

| Citation | Short title | Extent of repeal |
|---|---|---|
| 26 Geo. 5 & 1 Edw. 8. c. 49 | Public Health Act 1936 | Sections 187, 188, 193 and 199. |
| 7 & 8 Eliz. 2. c. 72 | Mental Health Act 1959 | Sections 14 to 18; section 23(2); and the entry relating to the Public Health Act 1936 in Part I of Schedule 7. |
| 1963 c. 13 | Nursing Homes Act 1963 | The whole act. |
| 1963 c. 33 | London Government Act 1963 | Section 40(4)(f) so far as it relates to sections 14 to 18 and 23(2) of the Mental Health Act 1959. |
| 1966 c. 42 | Local Government Act 1966 | In Schedule 3, Part II, the entry relating to section 187(2) of the Public Health Act 1936 and section 14 of the Mental Health Act 1959. |
| 1967 c. 80 | Criminal Justice Act 1967 | In Schedule 3, Part I, the entries relating to sections 15(3) and 16(2) of the Mental Health Act 1959 and to the Nursing Homes Act 1963. |
| 1973 c. 32 | National Health Service Reorganisation Act 1973 | Section 41; in section 56(4) the words "or the Nursing Homes Act 1963"; and paragraphs 5, 84 and 85 of Schedule 4. |

== Subsequent developments ==
The whole act was repealed by section 57(3) of, and schedule 3 to, the Registered Homes Act 1984, which came into force on 1 January 1985.
