= National Health Service Act 1977 =

Act of the Parliament of the United Kingdom

National Health Service Act 1977 (Note: Section 130(1).)
- Act of Parliament
- Parliament of the United Kingdom
- Long title: An Act to consolidate certain provisions relating to the health service for England and Wales; and to repeal certain enactments relating to the health service which have ceased to have any effect.
- Citation: 1977 c. 49
- Introduced by: Secretary of State for Social Services (Commons)
- Territorial extent: England and Wales (Note: Section 130(2).)

Dates
- Royal assent: 29 July 1977
- Commencement: 29 August 1977 (Note: Section 130(5).)

Other legislation
- Amends: Polish Resettlement Act 1947; See § Repealed enactments
- Repeals/revokes: See § Repealed enactments
- Amended by: Statute Law (Repeals) Act 1978; Reserve Forces Act 1980; Overseas Development and Co-operation Act 1980; Mental Health Act 1983; Medical Act 1983; Registered Homes Act 1984; Dentists Act 1984; Statute Law (Repeals) Act 1986; Income and Corporation Taxes Act 1988; Road Traffic (Consequential Provisions) Act 1988; Official Secrets Act 1989; Statute Law (Repeals) Act 1989; Opticians Act 1989; Social Security (Consequential Provisions) Act 1992; Trade Union and Labour Relations (Consolidation) Act 1992; Tribunals and Inquiries Act 1992; Health Service Commissioners Act 1993; Education Act 1996; Immigration and Asylum Act 1999; National Health Service (Consequential Provisions) Act 2006
- Relates to: National Health Service (Scotland) Act 1978

Status: Amended

Text of statute as originally enacted

Revised text of statute as amended

Text of the National Health Service Act 1977 as in force today (including any amendments) within the United Kingdom, from legislation.gov.uk.

The National Health Service Act 1977 (c. 49) is an act of the Parliament of the United Kingdom that sought to remove private provision from the National Health Service in England and Wales.

== Background ==
The Labour Party manifesto for the 1974 general election had included a pledge to abolish pay beds in the NHS. Barbara Castle, who had been made Secretary of State for Social Services in 1974, stated in the 1975 Queen's Speech debate that, 'The existence of pay beds, with the opportunity it gives to a few senior doctors to make private gain and the opportunity it gives to patients with money to jump the queue, is seen as a bitter affront to those thousands of other staff who are dedicated to the principle of a free health service.'

The abolition of private provision in the NHS met with opposition from some doctors who saw it as a threat to their independence and private income. Castle was also pushing to incentivise consultants to commit full time to NHS work (rather than part-time alongside private work) in their contract negotiations.

Harold Wilson asked Lord Goodman to mediate between Castle and the medical profession. He also established a Royal Commission on the National Health Service in 1975.

In response to the financial challenges the NHS faced under Castle at a time of economic instability, she established the Resource Allocation Working Party to lessen the differences in health spending in England between the north and the south.

Castle was removed from the cabinet by James Callaghan in 1976 and was succeeded at the Department of Health and Social Security by David Ennals. He successfully navigated the National Health Service Act 1977 through the House of Commons, which separated private and NHS facilities and sought the gradual removal of provision for private patients in NHS hospitals. However, the provisions relating to pay beds were repealed by the incoming Conservative government in the Health Services Act 1980.

== Provisions ==
=== Repealed enactments ===
Section 129(b) of the act repealed 20 enactments, listed in schedule 16 to the act.

Citation	Short title	Extent of repeal
26 Geo. 5 & 1 Edw. 8. c. 49	Public Health Act 1936	Section 203.
9 & 10 Geo. 6. c. 81	National Health Service Act 1946	The whole act.
12, 13 & 14 Geo. 6. c. 93	National Health Service (Amendment) Act 1949	Section 8. Sections 10 and 11. Sections 14 to 18. Sections 20(1) and 21. Section 23. Section 25. Sections 28 and 29(1). In section 32(1), the words from "and this Act" where they first occur to "1946 and 1949". In the Schedule, Part I.
14 & 15 Geo. 6. c. 31	National Health Service Act 1951	The whole act.
15 & 16 Geo. 6 & 1 Eliz. 2. c. 25	National Health Service Act 1952	The whole act.
7 & 8 Eliz. 2. c. 72	Mental Health Act 1959	In section 8(4), the words "Part III of the National Health Service Act, 1946, and under". In section 128(1), in paragraph (b), the words "the National Health Service Act, 1946, or", and the words, "or the National Health Service Reorganisation Act 1973". In Schedule 7, the entries relating to the National Health Service Act 1946, and the National Health Service (Amendment) Act 1949.
8 & 9 Eliz. 2. c. 49	Public Health Laboratory Service Act 1960	The whole act.
9 & 10 Eliz. 2. c. 19	National Health Service Act 1961	The whole act.
1964 c. 60	Emergency Laws (Re-enactments and Repeals) Act 1964	Section 5. In section 15, the words "the National Health Service Acts 1946 to 1973", and the words "and the corresponding enactments of the Parliament of Northern Ireland".
1965 c. 42	Public Health (Notification of Births) Act 1965	The whole act.
1966 c. 8	National Health Service Act 1966	In section 12(2), from the words "so far as" where they first occur to the words "and this Act".
1968 c. 46	Health Services and Public Health Act 1968	Part I. In section 63(8), in paragraph (a) of the definition of "the relevant enactments", the words "the 1946 Act". In section 64(3), paragraph (a)(ii) and paragraph (a)(xvi). In section 65(3), paragraph (b)(ii) and paragraph (b)(xvii). In section 79(1), from the words "and the" where they first occur to the words "1946 to 1968". In Schedule 2, Part I.
1968 c. 67	Medicines Act 1968	In Schedule 5, paragraph 11.
1970 c. 42	Local Authority Social Services Act 1970	In Schedule 1, in the entry relating to the Health Services and Public Health Act 1968, the references to sections 12 and 13 in the column headed "Enactment" and in the column headed "Nature of functions".
1972 c. 70	Local Government Act 1972	In Schedule 23, paragraphs 1, 5, 15(1) and (2).
1973 c. 32	National Health Service Reorganisation Act 1973	Sections 2 to 13. In section 15(3), the words "and in particular nothing in any provision of this Act amending section 55 of the principal Act (which relates to accounts)". Sections 21 and 22. Section 28. Part III. Section 40. Sections 42 and 43. Sections 45 to 48. Sections 50 to 53. Section 54(1) and (5). In section 55(1), the definitions of "special hospital" and "Special Trustees". In section 56—(a) in subsection (1), in paragraph (a), the words "or by virtue of section 34(1)(h) or (6) of this Act or subsection (6) of the following section"; (b) in subsection (3), the reference "23(2)"; (c) in subsection (4), the words "and any power conferred by section 7 of this Act to give directions by an instrument in writing"; (d) in subsection (5), the words "other than section 7". In section 57, subsections (1) and (6). In section 58—(a) in subsection (1), the word "and" where it first occurs, and paragraph (a); (b) subsection (6). Schedules 1, 3 and 4.
1974 c. 7	Local Government Act 1974	In Schedule 6, paragraph 21.
1976 c. 48	Parliamentary and other Pensions and Salaries Act 1976	Section 7.
1976 c. 59	National Health Service (Vocational Training) Act 1976	The whole act.
1976 c. 83	Health Services Act 1976	Section 2. Sections 4 and 5. Sections 7 to 11. In section 23—(a) in subsection (1), the definitions of "the 1946 Act" and "the National Health Service Acts"; (b) subsections (3) to (5). In Schedule 1, Part V. Schedule 3. In Schedule 4, Part I.

== See also ==
- National Health Service Reorganisation Act 1973
