= Health Services Act 1976 =

Act of the Parliament of the United Kingdom

Health Services Act 1976 (Note: Section 24(1).)
- Act of Parliament
- Parliament of the United Kingdom
- Long title: An Act to make further provision with respect to the use or acquisition by private patients and others of facilities and supplies available under the National Health Service Acts 1946 to 1973 or the National Health Service (Scotland) Acts 1947 to 1973; to control hospital building outside the National Health Service and provide for the amendment of enactments under which registration is a prerequisite for carrying on a nursing home or private hospital; and for those purposes to establish a Health Services Board.
- Citation: 1976 c. 83
- Territorial extent: England and Wales; Scotland; (Note: Section 24(3).)

Dates
- Royal assent: 22 November 1976
- Commencement: 22 November 1976 (except part II); 22 January 1977 (part II); (Note: Section 24(2).)
- Repealed: 1 April 1991
Other legislation
Amends	National Health Service Act 1946; National Health Service (Scotland) Act 1947; National Health Service Amendment Act 1949; Health Services and Public Health Act 1968; National Health Service (Scotland) Act 1972; National Health Service Reorganisation Act 1973
Amended by	National Health Service Act 1977; National Health Service (Scotland) Act 1978; Health Services Act 1980; Registered Homes Act 1984; Mental Health (Scotland) Act 1984
Repealed by	National Health Service and Community Care Act 1990

Status: Repealed

Text of statute as originally enacted

Revised text of statute as amended

The Health Services Act 1976 (c. 83) was an act of the Parliament of the United Kingdom.

It deals primarily with issues relating to private medicine in the United Kingdom. It established an independent Health Services Board to be responsible for the progressive withdrawal from NHS hospitals of pay beds.

== Subsequent developments ==
The whole act was repealed by section 66(2) of, and schedule 10 to, the National Health Service and Community Care Act 1990, which came into force on 1 April 1991.

== Bibliography ==
- Halsbury's Statutes
