= Regional health authority (United Kingdom) =

Regional health authorities in England and Wales (1974–1996)

Regional health authorities (RHAs) were National Health Service (NHS) organisations set up in 1974 by the National Health Service Reorganisation Act 1973 to replace regional hospital boards and to manage a lower tier of area health authorities (AHAs) in England. AHAs were created for Wales but not RHAs. Separate legislation was passed for Scotland. In 1996, the regional health authorities were abolished and replaced by eight regional offices of the NHS Executive as a result of the Health Authorities Act 1995.

== History ==
In July 1968, the Minister of Health, Kenneth Robinson, published a green paper, Administrative structure of the medical and related services in England and Wales. It proposed creating about 50 single-tier area boards taking responsibility for all health functions in each local government area. It triggered years of debate about the relationship between the NHS, local authorities, and health and social care. In September 1968, the separate ministries of health and of social care merged to form the Department of Health and Social Security.

In 1970, Richard Crossman rewrote Robinson's 1968 proposals, publishing a second green paper. Crossman rejected local authorities managing the health service and instead proposed that area authorities should remain directly under the Department of Health and Social Security. He retained the idea that the number and areas of the proposed new health authorities should match those of the proposed new local authorities, but added regional health councils which could undertake those activities for which the local area boards were too small.

Following the election of the Conservative government of 1970, the new Secretary of State, Keith Joseph, amended Crossman’s 1970 proposals. Under these plans published in July 1971, the upper-tier regional health authorities would also be responsible for general planning and the allocation of resources to the lower-tier area health authorities, as well as the coordination and supervision of the latter’s activities. This two-tier health system was in keeping with the Conservative government's proposals for a two-tier system of local government.

After years of debate, reform was made under the NHS Reorganisation Act 1973 which came into effect on 1 April 1974. This was the first time the service had been reorganised since it was established in 1948. It ended the 1948 tripartite system of separate provision of hospital services under regional hospital boards, hospital management committees and boards of governors; Family practitioner services under executive councils; and community health services (including health visiting, maternity services, vaccination and ambulance services) under local authorities. These organisations were replaced by one unitary structure of 90 area health authorities (AHAs) answering to 14 regional health authorities (RHAs) and, ultimately, to the Secretary of State for Social Services. Responsibility for public health was also taken from local authorities and given to the secretary of state, who also took on responsibility for school health. In effect, there was also a third lower administrative tier as the work of hospital management was done at district general hospital level.

The incoming Labour government of 1974 published a paper on Democracy in the NHS in May that added local government representatives to the new RHAs and increased their proportion on each AHA to a third.

A Royal Commission on the National Health Service was established in 1975 and published its report in July 1979. It heard complaints that the AHAs created under the 1973 Act added an extra and unnecessary tier of management. In 1982, the 90 AHAs were replaced by 192 district health authorities (DHAs) under the Health Services Act 1980, but the RHAs remained. Under the 1980 Act, RHAs retained their responsibilities for monitoring and implementing district plans and financial control but were expected to 'stand back' from the activities of the DHAs. The Royal Commission had also proposed that RHAs should be directly accountable to Parliament but this was rejected by the government and the secretary of state retained that accountability.

On their creation in 1974, there were 14 RHAs, but they were reduced in number to 8 in 1994 before being abolished altogether in 1996 and replaced by eight regional offices of the NHS Executive as a result of the Health Authorities Act 1995. The delegation of authority to DevoManc on 1 April 2016 was hailed by the editor of the British Medical Journal as a possible regeneration of regional health authorities.

Organisational history of the National Health Service in England
National Government	Ministry of Health (1919–1968)	Department of Health and Social Security (1968–1988)		Department of Health (1988 –2018)			Department of Health and Social Care (2018–Present)
National Level				NHS Executive (1996–2002)		NHS England † (2011–Present)	
Regional Level	Regional Hospital Boards (1947–1974)	Regional Health Authorities (1974–1996)		NHS Executive Regional Offices (1996–2002)	Strategic Health Authorities (2002–2013)		
District Level		Area Health Authorities (1974–1982)	District Health Authorities (1982–1996)	Health Authorities (1996–2002)		Clinical Commissioning Groups (2013–2022)	Integrated Care Boards (2022–Present)
Local Level	Hospital Management Committees (1947–1974)			NHS Trusts (1990–Present)			

† Note that NHS England is due to be dissolved by 2027 and its functions absorbed into the Department of Health and Social Care with the anticipated introduction of the NHS Modernisation Bill into parliament in 2026.

== List of RHAs ==
=== 1974–1994 ===
The RHAs closely followed the areas of the previous regional hospital boards established in 1947, but in many cases they were renamed.

RHB 1947–74	RHA 1974–94	Area covered
East Anglian	East Anglian	Cambridgeshire, Norfolk, Suffolk
Newcastle upon Tyne	Northern	Cleveland, Cumbria, County Durham, Northumberland, Tyne and Wear
North East Metropolitan	North East Thames	Essex, north east London
Manchester	North Western	Lancashire, Greater Manchester, Glossop
North West Metropolitan	North West Thames	Bedfordshire, Hertfordshire, north west London, Spelthorne
Liverpool	Mersey	Cheshire and Merseyside
Oxford	Oxford	Berkshire, Buckinghamshire, Oxfordshire, Northamptonshire
South East Metropolitan	South East Thames	Kent, East Sussex, south east London
South West	South Western	Bristol and district, Cornwall, Devon, Gloucestershire, Somerset
South West Metropolitan	South West Thames	Surrey (less Spelthorne), south west London, West Sussex
Sheffield	Trent	Derbyshire, Leicestershire, Lincolnshire, Nottinghamshire, South Yorkshire
Wessex (from 1959)	Wessex	Bath, Dorset, Hampshire, Isle of Wight, Wiltshire
Birmingham	West Midlands	Hereford and Worcester, Shropshire, Staffordshire, Warwickshire, West Midlands
Leeds	Yorkshire	Humberside, North Yorkshire, West Yorkshire

=== 1994–1996 ===
The regions were re-organised into eight regional health authorities by order in 1994.

RHA 1994–96	Area covered
Northern and Yorkshire	Cleveland, north Cumbria, Durham, Humberside, Northumberland, North Yorkshire, Tyne and Wear and West Yorkshire
Trent	Most of Derbyshire, Leicestershire, Lincolnshire, Nottinghamshire, South Yorkshire
Anglia and Oxford	Bedfordshire, Berkshire, Buckinghamshire, Cambridgeshire, Norfolk, Northamptonshire, Oxfordshire, Suffolk
North Thames	Essex, Hertfordshire, North London
South Thames (South East Thames & South West Thames)	East Sussex, Kent, Surrey, West Sussex, South London
South and West (Wessex and South Western)	Avon, Cornwall, Devon, Dorset, Gloucestershire, Hampshire, Isle of Wight, Isles of Scilly, Somerset, Wiltshire
West Midlands	Hereford and Worcester, Shropshire, Staffordshire, Warwickshire, West Midlands
North West (Mersey & North West)	Cheshire, Greater Manchester, Lancashire, Merseyside, south Cumbria, and Glossop from Derbyshire
