= NHS Executive =

The NHS Executive was an organisation of the United Kingdom's Department of Health. It was established in 1996 under the Health Authorities Act 1995 to replace the regional health authorities of the National Health Service and consisted of eight regional offices. It was abolished following the National Health Service Reform and Health Care Professions Act 2002.

== History ==
The NHS Executive was part of the British Department of Health established in 1996. It advised Ministers on the development of NHS policy and was responsible for the effective management of the NHS. The Executive ceased to exist on 1 April 2002 when 4 Regional Directorates of Health and Social Care were established and the central functions were reabsorbed into the Department of Health. The Regional Directorates were abolished in 2003.

The functions of the NHS Executive were provided through the Headquarters (mainly in Leeds and London) and eight regional offices which replaced the former regional health authorities. The Information Management Group (IMG) was part of the NHS Executive made up jointly of civil servants and NHS staff. The IMG formed part of the Human and Corporate Resources Directorate, represented on the NHS Executive Board by Ken Jarrold. Their aim was to improve the ability of the NHS to harness and benefit from the management of information and the use of information technology. One of their key objectives was to promote and implement the NHS Executive's national Information Management and Technology (IM&T) Strategy. The IMG worked with other parts of the NHS Executive and the wider Department of Health to identify and secure the information technology implications of national policy initiatives.

Organisational history of the National Health Service in England
National Government	Ministry of Health (1919–1968)	Department of Health and Social Security (1968–1988)		Department of Health (1988 –2018)			Department of Health and Social Care (2018–Present)
National Level				NHS Executive (1996–2002)		NHS England † (2011–Present)	
Regional Level	Regional Hospital Boards (1947–1974)	Regional Health Authorities (1974–1996)		NHS Executive Regional Offices (1996–2002)	Strategic Health Authorities (2002–2013)		
District Level		Area Health Authorities (1974–1982)	District Health Authorities (1982–1996)	Health Authorities (1996–2002)		Clinical Commissioning Groups (2013–2022)	Integrated Care Boards (2022–Present)
Local Level	Hospital Management Committees (1947–1974)			NHS Trusts (1990–Present)			

† Note that NHS England is due to be dissolved by 2027 and its functions absorbed into the Department of Health and Social Care with the anticipated introduction of the NHS Modernisation Bill into parliament in 2026.

== Offices ==
=== Main offices ===
- NHS Executive London HQ

NHS Executive, Department of Health, Richmond House, 79 Whitehall, London, SW1A 2NS

- NHS Executive Leeds HQ

Medical Education Unit, Quarry House, Quarry Hill, Leeds, LS2 7UE, United Kingdom

=== Regional offices ===
- NHS Executive Eastern

R & D Directorate, Capital Park, Fulbourn, Cambridge, CB1 5XB, United Kingdom

- NHS Executive North West

930-932 Birchwood Boulevard, Millennium Park, Birchwood, Warrington, WA3 7QN, United Kingdom

- NHS Executive Northern & Yorkshire Regional Office

R & D Directorate, John Snow House, Durham University Science Park, Durham, DH1 3YG, United Kingdom

- NHS Executive South East

Research & Knowledge Management Directorate, 40 Eastbourne Terrace, London, W2 3QR, United Kingdom

- NHS Executive South West

R & D Directorate, Westward House, Lime Kiln Close, Stoke Gifford, Bristol, BS34 8SR, United Kingdom

- NHS Executive Trent

R & D Directorate, Fulwood House, Old Fulwood Road, Sheffield, S10 3TH, United Kingdom

- NHS Executive West Midlands

R & D Directorate, Bartholomew House, 142 Hagley Road, Birmingham, West Midlands, B16 9PA, United Kingdom

- NHS Executive Anglia & Oxford

6-12 Capital Drive, Linford Wood, Milton Keynes, MK14 6QP, United Kingdom
