= District health authority =

Local health authority in England and Wales

District health authorities (DHAs) were National Health Service (NHS) administrative organisations set up in England and Wales in 1982 by the Health Services Act 1980. They replaced area health authorities (AHAs) and were responsible to an upper tier of regional health authorities (RHAs). Both the district and regional health authorities were abolished in 1996 as a result of the Health Authorities Act 1995.

== History ==
A Royal Commission on the National Health Service was established in 1975 and published its report in July 1979. It heard complaints that the AHAs created under the National Health Service Reorganisation Act 1973 added an extra and unnecessary tier of management. Although the 1973 Act had established a two-tier system of AHAs and RHAs, there was, in effect, a third lower administrative tier as the work of hospital management was done at district general hospital level.

The 'Patients First' consultation document was published in December 1979 which largely agreed with recommendations made by the Royal Commission to reduce the number of administrative tiers. In 1982, the 90 AHAs were abolished and replaced by 192 DHAs under the Health Services Act 1980, but the RHAs remained. DHAs were established centred on district hospitals, and not necessarily aligned to local authority boundaries as the 90 AHAs had been.

Just as the AHAs had done, each DHA worked alongside a family practitioner committee (replaced by family health services authorities in 1990), which was responsible for managing primary care services such as general practice, pharmacy and dentistry.

The districts were reorganised on a number of occasions in the 1990s, and in 1996, new single-tier health authorities replaced DHAs and family health services authorities as a result of the Health Authorities Act 1995.

Organisational history of the National Health Service in England
National Government	Ministry of Health (1919–1968)	Department of Health and Social Security (1968–1988)		Department of Health (1988 –2018)			Department of Health and Social Care (2018–Present)
National Level				NHS Executive (1996–2002)		NHS England † (2011–Present)	
Regional Level	Regional Hospital Boards (1947–1974)	Regional Health Authorities (1974–1996)		NHS Executive Regional Offices (1996–2002)	Strategic Health Authorities (2002–2013)		
District Level		Area Health Authorities (1974–1982)	District Health Authorities (1982–1996)	Health Authorities (1996–2002)		Clinical Commissioning Groups (2013–2022)	Integrated Care Boards (2022–Present)
Local Level	Hospital Management Committees (1947–1974)			NHS Trusts (1990–Present)			

† Note that NHS England is due to be dissolved by 2027 and its functions absorbed into the Department of Health and Social Care with the anticipated introduction of the NHS Modernisation Bill into parliament in 2026.

== See also ==
- List of district health authorities in England and Wales
