= National Health Service (Scotland) Act 1972 =

Act of the Parliament of the United Kingdom

National Health Service (Scotland) Act 1972 (Note: Section 65(2).)
- Act of Parliament
- Parliament of the United Kingdom
- Long title: An Act to make further provision as respects the health service in Scotland, and for connected purposes.
- Citation: 1972 c. 58
- Introduced by: Baroness Tweedsmuir of Belhelvie
- Territorial extent: Scotland (except amendments to the House of Commons Disqualification Act 1957) (Note: Section 65(3).)

Dates
- Royal assent: 9 August 1972
- Commencement: various (Note: Section 65(1).)

Other legislation
- Amends: Polish Resettlement Act 1947; National Health Service (Scotland) Act 1947; House of Commons Disqualification Act 1957; Immigration Act 1971
- Amended by: National Health Service Reorganisation Act 1973; House of Commons Disqualification Act 1975; Northern Ireland Assembly Disqualification Act 1975; Health Services Act 1976; National Health Service (Scotland) Act 1978; Employment Protection (Consolidation) Act 1978; Mental Health (Amendment) (Scotland) Act 1983; Mental Health (Scotland) Act 1984; Tribunals and Inquiries Act 1992; Health Professions Order 2001 (Consequential Amendments) Order 2003; Public Health etc. (Scotland) Act 2008; Public Health etc. (Scotland) Act 2008 (Commencement No. 2, Savings and Consequential Provisions) Order 2009

Status: Amended

Text of statute as originally enacted

Revised text of statute as amended

Text of the National Health Service (Scotland) Act 1972 as in force today (including any amendments) within the United Kingdom, from legislation.gov.uk.

The National Health Service (Scotland) Act 1972 (c. 58) is an act of the Parliament of the United Kingdom.

The act imposed duties on the Secretary of State for Scotland relating to the provision of health services and education, and established 15 Health Boards and local health committees as part of a reorganisation that dissolved multiple previous bodies including the Regional Hospital Boards, Boards of Management and Executive Councils. The Health Boards covered groups of local government districts and island councils that existed between 1975 and 1996. They formed the upper tier of the Scottish health care system. Responsibility for community health services was also transferred from local authorities.

The act established the post of Health Service Commissioner for Scotland, a role held alongside that of the equivalent posts for England and Wales – which were established by the National Health Service Reorganisation Act the following year – by the Parliamentary Commissioner for Administration.

The act also established the Scottish Health Service Planning Council, and a Common Services Agency for the Scottish Health Service.

A similar system was established in England and Wales under the National Health Service Reorganisation Act 1973 which also amended the 1972 act.

== Subsequent developments ==
The whole act, except sections 24(2), 26 to 28, 32 to 36, 52, 53 and 61(1)–(3), and schedule 4, was repealed by section 109(b) of, and schedule 17 to, the National Health Service (Scotland) Act 1978, which came into force on 1 January 1979.
