= Royal Commission on the National Health Service =

Public inquiry set up by the Wilson government in the UK in 1975

The Royal Commission on the National Health Service was a Royal commission set up by the Wilson government in 1975. It was to consider the "best use and management of the financial and manpower resources of the NHS".

The Royal Commission reported in June 1979, by which time the government had changed. It recommended, among other things, that the administration of the Health Service should be simplified by eliminating, in most cases, a tier of management, a recommendation which appealed to Patrick Jenkin the new Secretary of State for Social Services. Area Health Authorities were abolished in 1982 and replaced by district health authorities under the Health Services Act 1980.

The idea that responsibility for the delivery of health services should be transferred from the Department of Health and Social Security to the Regional Health Authorities was less welcome.

The members of the Royal Commission were:

- Sir Alec Merrison (Chair);
- Ivor Ralph Campbell Batchelor CBE, Dundee University;
- Paul Anthony Bramley, Sheffield University;
- Sir Thomas Brown, Eastern Health and Social Services Board;
- Cecil Montacute Clothier QC (resigned January 1979);
- Ann Clwyd;
- Peter Roy Albert Jacques, Trades Union Congress;
- Jean McFarlane;
- Audrey Prime OBE, Enfield and Haringey Area Health Authority;
- Kathleen Brenda Richards, Hertfordshire County Council;
- Sir Simpson Stevenson, Greater Glasgow Health Board;
- Lady Sherman, NE Thames Regional Health Authority;
- Dr Cyril Taylor;
- Dr Christopher John Wells OBE;
- Frank Reeson Welsh, Grindlays Bank;
- Professor Alan Williams (resigned 31 August 1978);
