= Family practitioner committee =

Family practitioner committees were established by the National Health Service Re-organisation Act 1973. They replaced local executive councils, which had been established in 1948 to manage primary care.

Executive councils were direct descendants of the insurance committees established by section 59 of the National Insurance Act 1911 but with additional responsibility for NHS dentistry and NHS optician services. Their role was essentially neutral and routine. They played little part in developing the services they administered. There were 138 executive councils in England and Wales and 25 in Scotland. The role of the council was to maintain GPs’ lists of patients and to receive practitioners’ claims for payment. It was headed by an administrator with managerial control only over the staff, not the practitioners.

Each family practitioner committee had thirty members, eleven of which were appointed by the area health authority with which it was coterminous. Eight were appointed by the local medical committee, three by the local dental committee, two by the local pharmaceutical committee, two by the local optical committee and four by the local authority.

One of the tasks of the committee was to maintain lists of registered patients and registered practitioners.

The National Health Service and Community Care Act 1990 abolished the committees, and they were replaced by family health services authorities. Nearly half of all family practitioner committee administrators were sacked, and the new appointees came from outside the NHS, nearly all from industry or the armed forces. The functions of the FHSAs were later subsumed into primary care trusts. The Family Health Services Appeal Authority was established to hear appeals and applications resulting from decisions made about the inclusion of patients and practitioners in lists. It was abolished in 2005.
