= Parliamentary under-secretary of state =

Junior minister in the government of the United Kingdom

The parliamentary under-secretary of state (historically under-secretary of state or just parliamentary secretary, particularly in departments not led by a secretary of state) is the lowest of three tiers of government minister in the UK government, immediately junior to a minister of state, which is itself junior to a secretary of state.

== Background ==
Ministers of the Crown (Parliamentary Secretaries) Act 1960 (Note: Section 6(2).)
- Act of Parliament
- Parliament of the United Kingdom
- Long title: An Act to replace the existing limits on the numbers of Parliamentary Secretaries in individual departments by a single aggregate limit; to authorise the payment of a salary to a Parliamentary Secretary to the Minister for Science; and to increase the salary of the Captain of the Gentlemen-at-Arms.
- Citation: 9 & 10 Eliz. 2. c. 6
- Territorial extent: United Kingdom

Dates
- Royal assent: 20 December 1960
- Commencement: 20 December 1960 (Note: The Acts of Parliament (Commencement) Act 1793.)

Other legislation
- Amends: Board of Agriculture Act 1889; Board of Agriculture and Fisheries Act 1909; New Ministries and Secretaries Act 1916; Air Force (Constitution) Act 1917; Ministry of Health Act 1919; Ministry Of Transport Act 1919; Ministers of the Crown Act 1937; Ministry of Supply Act 1939; Education Act 1944; Ministry of National Insurance Act 1944; Ministry of Fuel and Power Act 1945; Ministerial Salaries Act 1946; Ministry of Defence Act 1946; Transfer of Functions (Ministry of Pensions) Order 1953; Transfer of Functions (Ministry of Civil Aviation) Order 1953; Transfer of Functions (Ministry of Food) Order 1955; Ministerial Salaries Act 1957
- Repeals/revokes: Ministers of the Crown (Parliamentary Under-Secretaries) Act 1951
- Amended by: Ministers of the Crown Act 1964; Secretary of State for Education and Science Order 1964; Ministerial Salaries and Members' Pensions Act 1965; Statute Law (Repeals) Act 1974; Statute Law (Repeals) Act 1978; Ministry of Agriculture, Fisheries and Food (Dissolution) Order 2002

Status: Partially repealed

Text of statute as originally enacted

Revised text of statute as amended

Text of the Ministers of the Crown (Parliamentary Secretaries) Act 1960 as in force today (including any amendments) within the United Kingdom, from legislation.gov.uk.

The Ministerial and Other Salaries Act 1975 (c. 27) provides that at any one time there can be no more than 83 paid ministers (not counting the Lord Chancellor, up to 3 law officers, and up to 22 whips). Of these, no more than 50 ministers can be paid the salary of a minister senior to a parliamentary secretary. Thus, if 50 senior ministers are appointed, the maximum number of paid parliamentary secretaries is 33.

The limit on the number of unpaid parliamentary secretaries is given by the House of Commons Disqualification Act 1975, ensuring that no more than 95 government ministers of any kind can sit in the House of Commons at any one time; there is no upper bound to the number of unpaid ministers sitting in the House of Lords.

The position should not be confused with the permanent secretary, which is the most senior civil servant in a government department (also known as the permanent under-secretary of state), nor with a parliamentary private secretary (an MP serving as an assistant to a minister entitled to directly relevant expenses but no further pay).

Of his tenure as an under-secretary in Macmillan's 1957–1963 Conservative government from the Lords, the Duke of Devonshire noted: "No one who hasn't been a Parliamentary Under Secretary of State has any conception of how unimportant a Parliamentary Under Secretary of State is".

== List of parliamentary under-secretaries of state ==
=== Current ===
There are 44 parliamentary under-secretaries of state, of whom six are unpaid.

The current parliamentary under-secretaries of state are:

- HM Treasury
  - Economic Secretary to the Treasury
  - Exchequer Secretary to the Treasury
- Foreign, Commonwealth and Development Office (see Under-Secretary of State for Foreign Affairs)
  - Parliamentary Under-Secretary of State for Indo-Pacific
  - Parliamentary Under-Secretary of State for Africa
  - Parliamentary Under-Secretary of State for the Middle East, Afghanistan and Pakistan
  - Parliamentary Under-Secretary of State for Latin America and Caribbean
- Home Office (see Under-Secretary of State for the Home Department)
  - Parliamentary Under-Secretary of State for Safeguarding and Violence Against Women and Girls
  - Parliamentary Under-Secretary of State for Migration and Citizenship
- Ministry of Justice
  - Parliamentary Under-Secretary of State for Justice
  - Parliamentary Under-Secretary of State
  - Parliamentary Under-Secretary of State
- Ministry of Defence
  - Parliamentary Under-Secretary of State for the Armed Forces
  - Parliamentary Under-Secretary of State for Veterans and People
- Department of Health and Social Care
  - Parliamentary Under-Secretary of State for Public Health and Prevention
  - Parliamentary Under-Secretary of State for Mental Health and Women's Health Strategy
- Department for Energy Security and Net Zero
  - Parliamentary Under-Secretary of State for Climate
  - Parliamentary Under-Secretary of State for Energy
  - Parliamentary Under-Secretary of State for Energy Consumers
- Department for Business and Trade
  - Parliamentary Under-Secretary of State for Services, Small Business and Exports (joint with UK Export Finance)
  - Parliamentary Under-Secretary of State for Employment Rights, Competition and Markets
  - Parliamentary Under-Secretary of State for Legislation
- Department for Work and Pensions
  - Parliamentary Under-Secretary of State for Transformation
  - Parliamentary Under-Secretary of State for Pensions
- Department for Education
  - Parliamentary Under-Secretary of State for Children and Families
  - Parliamentary Under-Secretary for Equalities (Race and Ethnicity)
  - Parliamentary Under-Secretary of State for Equalities (LGBT+)
  - Parliamentary Under-Secretary of State for Early Education
- Department for Environment, Food and Rural Affairs
  - Parliamentary Under-Secretary of State for Water and Flooding
  - Parliamentary Under-Secretary of State for Nature
  - Parliamentary Under-Secretary of State (Lords Minister)
- Ministry of Housing, Communities and Local Government
  - Parliamentary Under-Secretary of State for Homelessness and Democracy
  - Parliamentary Under-Secretary of State for Local Growth and Building Safety
  - Parliamentary Under-Secretary of State (Lords Minister)
  - Parliamentary Under-Secretary of State for Devolution, Faith and Communities
- Department for Transport
  - Parliamentary Under-Secretary of State for Local Transport
  - Parliamentary Under-Secretary of State for Future Roads
  - Parliamentary Under-Secretary of State for Aviation, Maritime and Security
- Department for Culture, Media and Sport
  - Parliamentary Under-Secretary of State for Sport, Media, Civil Society and Youth
  - Parliamentary Under-Secretary of State for Gambling
- Department for Science, Innovation and Technology
  - Parliamentary Under-Secretary of State for AI and Digital Government
  - Parliamentary Under-Secretary of State for the Future Digital Economy and Online Safety
- Scotland Office
  - Parliamentary Under-Secretary of State for Scotland
- Wales Office
  - Parliamentary Under-Secretary of State for Wales
- Northern Ireland Office
  - Parliamentary Under-Secretary of State for Northern Ireland
- UK Export Finance
  - Parliamentary Under-Secretary of State for Services, Small Business and Exports (joint with Department for International Trade)

=== Historic ===
- Department for Exiting the European Union
  - Parliamentary Under-Secretary of State for Exiting the European Union
- Department of Health and Social Care
  - Parliamentary Secretary to the Ministry of Health
- Ministry of Technology
  - Parliamentary Secretary, Ministry of Technology
- Foreign Affairs and War
  - Under-Secretary of State for Air at the Air Ministry
  - Under-Secretary of State for Foreign and Commonwealth Affairs was formed in 1968 by the merging of
    - Under-Secretary of State for Foreign Affairs
    - Under-Secretary of State for Commonwealth Affairs, which was the result of the 1966 merger of
      - Under-Secretary of State for the Colonies at the Colonial Office
      - Under-Secretary of State for Commonwealth Relations, which was originally
        - Under-Secretary of State for Dominion Affairs
  - Under-Secretary of State for India at the India Office
  - Under-Secretary for Ireland who lived at the Under Secretary's Lodge
  - Under-Secretary of State for War and the Colonies, which was the result of the 1801 merger of the
    - Under-Secretary of State for War
    - Under-Secretary of State for the Colonies
  - Parliamentary Secretary to the Ministry of Supply
- Ministry of Transport
  - Parliamentary Secretary to the Ministry of Transport
  - Under-Secretary of State for Transport

== See also ==
- List of undersecretary positions
- Parliamentary secretary
- Permanent secretary
- Private secretary
- Undersecretary
