= House of Commons Disqualification Act =

Stock short title used for UK legislation

House of Commons (Disqualification) Act (with its variations) is a stock short title used in the United Kingdom for legislation relating those ineligible to serve as members of the House of Commons.

== List ==
- The House of Commons (Disqualification) Act 1693 (5 & 6 Will. & Mar. c. 7)
- The House of Commons Disqualification Act 1957 (5 & 6 Eliz. 2. c. 20)
- The House of Commons Disqualification Act 1975 (c. 24)

The House of Commons (Disqualifications) Acts 1715 to 1821 is the collective title of the following Acts:

- The Crown Pensioners Disqualification Act 1715 (1 Geo. 1. St. 2. c. 56)
- The House of Commons (Disqualification) Act 1741 (15 Geo. 2. c. 22) (also known as the Place Act 1742)
- The House of Commons (Disqualifications) Act 1782 (22 Geo. 3. c. 45)
- The House of Commons (Disqualifications) Act 1801 (41 Geo. 3. (U.K.) c. 52)
- The House of Commons (Clergy Disqualification) Act 1801 (41 Geo. 3. (U.K.) c. 63)
- The Members of Parliament (Bankruptcy) Act 1812 (52 Geo. 3. c. 144)
- The House of Commons (Disqualifications) Act 1813 (54 Geo. 3. c. 16)
- The House of Commons (Disqualifications) Act 1821 (1 & 2 Geo. 4. c. 44)

== See also ==
- List of short titles
