= Ministerial and other Salaries Act 1972 =

Act of the Parliament of the United Kingdom

Ministerial and other Salaries Act 1972 (Note: Section 2.)
- Act of Parliament
- Parliament of the United Kingdom
- Long title: An Act to make new provision as to the salaries payable to the holders of Ministerial and other offices, and for purposes connected therewith.
- Citation: 1972 c. 3
- Territorial extent: United Kingdom

Dates
- Royal assent: 10 February 1972
- Commencement: 10 February 1972 (section 2) (Note: The Acts of Parliament (Commencement) Act 1793.); 1 April 1972 (section 1) (Note: Section 1(7).)
- Repealed: 8 May 1975
Other legislation
Amended by	Ministers of the Crown Act 1974; House of Commons Disqualification Act 1975
Repealed by	Ministerial and Other Salaries Act 1975

Status: Repealed

Text of statute as originally enacted

The Ministerial and other Salaries Act 1972 (c. 3) was an act of the Parliament of the United Kingdom that made new provision for the salaries payable to the holders of ministerial and other offices in the United Kingdom.

== Provisions ==
=== Repealed enactments ===
Section 1(6) of the act repealed 4 enactments, listed in schedule 4 to the act.

Enactments repealed by section 1(6)
Citation	Short title	Extent of repeal
2 & 3 Will. 4. c. 105	House of Commons (Speaker) Act 1832	The whole act.
1965 c. 11	Ministerial Salaries and Members' Pensions Act 1965	Section 3.
1965 c. 11	Ministerial Salaries and Members' Pensions Act 1965	Section 20(1).
1965 c. 11	Ministerial Salaries and Members' Pensions Act 1965	Schedule 4, so far as unrepealed.
1965 c. 58	Ministerial Salaries Consolidation Act 1965	The whole act, except section 3; section 6; section 7(3) with the omission of the words preceding "any pension"; section 9(3); and section 10.
1965 c. 61	Judges' Remuneration Act 1965	Section 2(1).
1965 c. 61	Judges' Remuneration Act 1965	In section 4(1) the words "and 2(1)", and in section 4(2) the words "or section 2(1)".

== Subsequent developments ==
The whole act was repealed by section 5(3) of, and schedule 3 to, the Ministerial and Other Salaries Act 1975, which came into force on 8 May 1975.
