= Late Night Refreshment Houses Act 1969 =

Act of the Parliament of the United Kingdom

Late Night Refreshment Houses Act 1969 (Note: Section 15(1).)
- Act of Parliament
- Parliament of the United Kingdom
- Long title: An Act to consolidate certain enactments relating to refreshment houses within the meaning of the Refreshment Houses Act 1860, with corrections and improvements made under the Consolidation of Enactments (Procedure) Act 1949.
- Citation: 1969 c. 53
- Territorial extent: England and Wales (Note: Section 15(3).)

Dates
- Royal assent: 22 October 1969
- Commencement: 1 January 1970 (Note: Section 15(2).)
- Repealed: 24 November 2005 (Note: The Licensing Act 2003 (Commencement No. 7 and Transitional Provisions) Order 2005 (SI 2005/3056).)

Other legislation
- Amends: See § Repealed enactments
- Repeals/revokes: See § Repealed enactments
- Amended by: Courts Act 1971; Local Government Act 1972; Local Government Act 1974; Local Government (Miscellaneous Provisions) Act 1982; Criminal Justice Act 1982; Local Government (Wales) Act 1994; Access to Justice Act 1999
- Repealed by: Licensing Act 2003
- Relates to: Consolidation of Enactments (Procedure) Act 1949

Status: Repealed

Text of statute as originally enacted

Revised text of statute as amended

The Late Night Refreshment Houses Act 1969 (c. 53) was an act of the Parliament of the United Kingdom that consolidated enactments relating to the licensing of late-night refreshment houses, within the meaning of the Refreshment Houses Act 1860 (23 & 24 Vict. c. 27), in England and Wales, with corrections and improvements made under the Consolidation of Enactments (Procedure) Act 1949 (12, 13 & 14 Geo. 6. c. 33).

== Provisions ==
=== Repealed enactments ===
Section 14 of the act repealed 10 enactments, listed in the schedule to the act.

Citation	Short title	Extent of repeal
23 & 24 Vict. c. 27	Refreshment Houses Act 1860	Sections 1, 2, 6, 9 to 12, 16, 18, 32 and 41.
24 & 25 Vict. c. 91	Revenue (No. 2) Act 1861	Sections 8 and 9.
27 & 28 Vict. c. 18	Revenue (No. 1) Act 1864	Section 5.
12, 13 & 14 Geo. 6. c. 47	Finance Act 1949	In section 15, paragraph (d) of subsection (1), subsection (4), and, in subsection (9) the words "and references to licences to keep refreshment houses shall not apply".
15 & 16 Geo. 6 & 1 Eliz. 2. c. 44	Customs and Excise Act 1952	In section 237(2), the words "the Refreshment Houses Act 1860 or".
10 & 11 Eliz. 2. c. 52	Penalties for Drunkenness Act 1962	In section 1(2)(a), the words "section forty-one of the Refreshment Houses Act 1860".
1963 c. 2	Betting, Gaming and Lotteries Act 1963	In section 40, the words "section 32 of the Refreshment Houses Act 1860".
1964 c. 88	Refreshment Houses Act 1964	The whole act, except so much of the Schedule as provides a new subsection (1) for section 100 of the Licensing Act 1964.
1966 c. 42	Local Government Act 1966	In Part II of Schedule 3, the entry (numbered 2) relating to the Revenue (No. 2) Act 1861.
1967 c. 38	Refreshment Houses Act 1967	The whole act.

== Subsequent developments ==
Section 3(2) and (3) and section 12 were repealed by the Local Government Act 1974, schedule 8.

The whole act was repealed by section 199 of, and schedule 7 to, the Licensing Act 2003, which came into force on 24 November 2005.
