= Ministers of the Crown Act 1975 =

Act of the Parliament of the United Kingdom

Ministers of the Crown Act 1975 (Note: Section 9(1).)
- Act of Parliament
- Parliament of the United Kingdom
- Long title: An Act to consolidate the enactments relating to the redistribution of functions between Ministers of the Crown, the alteration of the style and title of such Ministers and certain other provisions about such Ministers.
- Citation: 1975 c. 26
- Territorial extent: United Kingdom (Note: Section 9(2).)

Dates
- Royal assent: 8 May 1975
- Commencement: 8 May 1975 (Note: The Acts of Parliament (Commencement) Act 1793.)
Other legislation
Amends	Decimal Currency Act 1967; See § Repealed enactments
Repeals/revokes	See § Repealed enactments
Amended by	Statute Law (Repeals) Act 1976; Statute Law (Repeals) Act 1977; Ministry of Overseas Development (Dissolution) Order 1979; Constitutional Reform Act 2005; Commissioners for Revenue and Customs Act 2005; Welfare Reform Act 2012
Relates to	House of Commons Disqualification Act 1975; Northern Ireland Assembly Disqualification Act 1975; Ministerial and Other Salaries Act 1975

Status: Amended

Text of statute as originally enacted

Revised text of statute as amended

Text of the Ministers of the Crown Act 1975 as in force today (including any amendments) within the United Kingdom, from legislation.gov.uk.

The Ministers of the Crown Act 1975 (c. 26) is an act of the Parliament of the United Kingdom that consolidated enactments relating to the redistribution of functions among ministers of the Crown, the alteration of the style and title of such ministers and certain other provisions about such ministers in the United Kingdom.

== Provisions ==
=== Repealed enactments ===
Section 8(4) of the act repealed 4 enactments, listed in schedule 3 to the act.

Enactments repealed by section 8(4)
Citation	Short title	Extent of repeal
9 & 10 Geo. 6. c. 31	Ministers of the Crown (Transfer of Functions) Act 1946	The whole act, so far as unrepealed.
1964 c. 98	Ministers of the Crown Act 1964	The whole act, so far as unrepealed.
5 & 6 Eliz. 2. c. 20	House of Commons Disqualification Act 1957	Section 2(3).
1974 c. 21	Ministers of the Crown Act 1974	The whole act, so far as unrepealed.
