= Local Government Act 1974 =

Local Government Act 1974 may refer to:

- Local Government Act 1974 (New Zealand)
- Local Government Act 1974 (United Kingdom)
