= Slaughterhouses Act 1974 =

Act of the Parliament of the United Kingdom

Slaughterhouses Act 1974 (Note: Section 48(1).)
- Act of Parliament
- Parliament of the United Kingdom
- Long title: An Act to consolidate certain enactments relating to slaughterhouses and knackers' yards and the slaughter of animals.
- Citation: 1974 c. 3
- Territorial extent: England and Wales (Note: Section 48(4).)

Dates
- Royal assent: 8 February 1974
- Commencement: 1 April 1974 (Note: Section 48(3).)

Other legislation
- Amends: See § Repealed enactments
- Repeals/revokes: See § Repealed enactments
- Amended by: Local Government Act 1974; Local Government (Miscellaneous Provisions) Act 1976; Magistrates' Courts Act 1980; Animal Health Act 1981; Acquisition of Land Act 1981; Criminal Justice Act 1982; Public Health (Control of Disease) Act 1984; Food Act 1984; Welfare of Animals at Slaughter Act 1991; Statute Law (Repeals) Act 1993; Local Government (Wales) Act 1994; Welfare of Animals (Slaughter or Killing) Regulations 1995; Deregulation (Slaughterhouses Act 1974 and Slaughter of Animals (Scotland) Act 1980) Order 1996; Animal By-Products Regulations 2005; Animal By-Products (Wales) Regulations 2006; Welfare of Animals at the Time of Killing (England) Regulations 2015
- Relates to: Slaughter of Animals (Prevention of Cruelty) (Amendment) Regulations 1983; Slaughter of Pigs (Anaesthesia) (Amendment) Regulations 1984; Slaughter of Animals (Prevention of Cruelty) (Amendment) Regulations 1984; Slaughter of Animals (Humane Conditions) Regulations 1990

Status: Amended

Text of statute as originally enacted

Revised text of statute as amended

Text of the Slaughterhouses Act 1974 as in force today (including any amendments) within the United Kingdom, from legislation.gov.uk.

The Slaughterhouses Act 1974 (c. 3) is an act of the Parliament of the United Kingdom that consolidated enactments relating to slaughterhouses and knackers' yards and the slaughter of animals in England and Wales.

== Provisions ==
=== Repealed enactments ===
Section 47(2) of the act repealed 6 enactments, listed in the sixth schedule to the act.

Citation	Short title	Extent of repeal
4 & 5 Eliz. 2. c. 16	Food and Drugs Act 1955	Part IV except section 80.
4 & 5 Eliz. 2. c. 16	Food and Drugs Act 1955	In section 80, in subsection (1), the words "a public slaughterhouse or ".
4 & 5 Eliz. 2. c. 16	Food and Drugs Act 1955	In section 120(1), the words from "The reference in this subsection" to the end.
4 & 5 Eliz. 2. c. 16	Food and Drugs Act 1955	Section 125(1)(c).
4 & 5 Eliz. 2. c. 16	Food and Drugs Act 1955	In section 130(1), the words "or of paragraph (a) of section seventy-four thereof".
4 & 5 Eliz. 2. c. 16	Food and Drugs Act 1955	In section 135(1), in the definition of "premises" the words "except in Part IV of this Act" and the definitions of "slaughterhouse facilities" and "slaughterhouse licence".
6 & 7 Eliz. 2. c. 70	Slaughterhouses Act 1958	The whole act.
7 & 8 Eliz. 2. c. 8	Slaughter of Animals Act 1958	The whole act.
1963 c. 33	London Government Act 1963	In section 54(1), paragraph (c), the words "and the local authority for the purposes of each of the said Acts of 1958" and the words "slaughterhouses, knackers' yards, and".
1963 c. 33	London Government Act 1963	In Schedule 13, Part III.
1967 c. 80	Criminal Justice Act 1967	In Part I of Schedule 3, the entries relating to section 69(2) of the Food and Drugs Act 1955 and section 8(2) of the Slaughter of Animals Act 1958.
1972 c. 62	Agriculture (Miscellaneous Provisions) Act 1972	Section 5.
1972 c. 62	Agriculture (Miscellaneous Provisions) Act 1972	In section 27, in subsection (2), the words "paragraphs (a), (c), (d) and (e) of subsection (1) and subsections (2) and (3) of section 5" and the words "to sections 65, 70(1) and 75 to 78 of the Food and Drugs Act 1955, to the Slaughterhouses Act 1958"; and in subsection (4), the word "5" where it first occurs.
