= Reserve Forces (Safeguard of Employment) Act 1985 =

Act of the Parliament of the United Kingdom

Reserve Forces (Safeguard of Employment) Act 1985 (Note: Section 23(1).)
- Act of Parliament
- Parliament of the United Kingdom
- Long title: An Act to consolidate certain enactments as to the reinstatement in civil employment of members of the reserve and auxiliary forces who have been called into whole-time service in the armed forces of the Crown, and for the protection of the employment of those liable to be called into such service.
- Citation: 1985 c. 17
- Territorial extent: United Kingdom (Note: Section 23(2).)

Dates
- Royal assent: 9 May 1985
- Commencement: 9 August 1985 (Note: Section 23(3).)
Other legislation
Amends	Reserve and Auxiliary Forces (Protection of Civil Interests) Act 1951; Companies Act (Northern Ireland) 1960; Tribunals and Inquiries Act 1971; House of Commons Disqualification Act 1975; Northern Ireland Assembly Disqualification Act 1975; Employment Protection (Consolidation) Act 1978; Reserve Forces Act 1980; Bankruptcy Amendment (Northern Ireland) Order 1980; See § Repealed enactments
Repeals/revokes	See § Repealed enactments
Amended by	Reserve Forces Act 1996; Employment Rights Act 1996; Reserve Forces Act 1996 (Consequential Provisions etc.) Regulations 1998; Constitutional Reform Act 2005; Tribunals, Courts and Enforcement Act 2007; Northern Ireland Act 2009; Public Service Pensions and Judicial Offices Act 2022

Status: Amended

Text of statute as originally enacted

Revised text of statute as amended

Text of the Reserve Forces (Safeguard of Employment) Act 1985 as in force today (including any amendments) within the United Kingdom, from legislation.gov.uk.

The Reserve Forces (Safeguard of Employment) Act 1985 (c. 17) is an act of the Parliament of the United Kingdom that consolidated enactments relating to the reinstatement in civil employment of members of the reserve and auxiliary forces called into whole-time service in the armed forces of the Crown, and the protection of the employment of those liable to be called into such service, in the United Kingdom.

== Provisions ==
=== Repealed enactments ===
Section 21(2)(b) of the act repealed 4 enactments, listed in schedule 5 to the act.

Citation	Short title	Extent of repeal
11 & 12 Geo. 6. c. 64	National Service Act 1948	The whole act.
14 & 15 Geo. 6. c. 10	Reinstatement in Civil Employment Act 1950	The whole act.
1971 c. 62	Tribunals and Inquiries Act 1971	Section 9.
1978 c. 44	Employment Protection (Consolidation) Act 1978	In Schedule 13, paragraph 16(2).
