= Ministerial and Other Salaries Act 1975 =

Act of the Parliament of the United Kingdom

Ministerial and Other Salaries Act 1975 (Note: Section 5(1).)
- Act of Parliament
- Parliament of the United Kingdom
- Long title: An Act to consolidate the enactments relating to the salaries of Ministers and Opposition Leaders and Chief Whips and to other matters connected therewith.
- Citation: 1975 c. 27
- Territorial extent: United Kingdom

Dates
- Royal assent: 8 May 1975
- Commencement: 8 May 1975 (Note: The Acts of Parliament (Commencement) Act 1793.)

Other legislation
- Amends: See § Repealed enactments
- Repeals/revokes: See § Repealed enactments
- Amended by: Ministerial and other Salaries Act 1997; Constitutional Reform Act 2005; Lord Chancellor (Transfer of Functions and Supplementary Provisions) (No. 3) Order 2006; Ministerial and other Salaries Act 1975 (Amendment) Order 2011; Public Service Pensions Act 2013; Ministerial Salaries (Amendment) Act 2026; Ministerial and other Salaries Act 1975 (Amendment) Order 2026
- Relates to: House of Commons Disqualification Act 1975; Northern Ireland Assembly Disqualification Act 1975; Ministers of the Crown Act 1975; Ministerial and other Maternity Allowances Act 2021

Status: Amended

Text of statute as originally enacted

Revised text of statute as amended

Text of the Ministerial and Other Salaries Act 1975 as in force today (including any amendments) within the United Kingdom, from legislation.gov.uk.

The Ministerial and Other Salaries Act 1975 (c. 27) is an act of the Parliament of the United Kingdom that governs the salaries of ministerial and certain other political offices in the UK. It was amended by the Ministerial Salaries (Amendment) Act 2026.

In 2003, a joint public bill committee deemed the act one of "the fundamental parts of constitutional law..."

== Provisions ==
=== Salaries ===
The act sets out the salaries of government ministers, opposition leaders, opposition whips and the speakers of the two Houses of Parliament. (Note: Some salaries set out in the act are different depending on whether the office holder is an MP or not. Office holders who are MPs also receive a salary by virtue of that role.)

==== Government ministers ====
There can be up to 111 paid posts across the following ministerial offices (this limit was 100 before 29 April 2026).

Salary		Office
MP	Not MP	Office
£76,762		Prime Minister and First Lord of the Treasury
£68,827		Chancellor of the Exchequer
£68,827	£101,038	Secretary of State (Note: Office explicitly capable of having multiple concurrent salaried holders.)
£68,827	£101,038	Cabinet members who hold the offices of: Lord President of the Council, Lord Privy Seal, Chancellor of the Duchy of Lancaster, Paymaster General, Chief Secretary to the Treasury, Parliamentary Secretary to the Treasury or; Minister of State
£33,002	£78,891	Non-Cabinet members (Note: Non-Cabinet members includes any minister designated as attending Cabinet.) who hold the offices of: Lord President of the Council, Lord Privy Seal, Chancellor of the Duchy of Lancaster, Paymaster General, Chief Secretary to the Treasury, Parliamentary Secretary to the Treasury or; Minister of State
£33,002	£78,891	Ministers in charge of government departments who are not a member of the Cabinet and who are not eligible for a salary under any other part of the act
£33,002	£78,891	Financial Secretary to the Treasury
£23,697	£68,710	Parliamentary Secretary (Note: Office typically named Parliamentary Under-Secretary of State in departments led by a Secretary of State. The equivalent offices in HM Treasury are typically Economic Secretary to the Treasury, Exchequer Secretary to the Treasury and Commercial Secretary to the Treasury.) (other than Parliamentary Secretary to the Treasury)
£19,239		Junior Lord of the Treasury
£19,239		Assistant Government Whip, House of Commons
	£63,537	Lord- or Baroness-in-waiting

There can also be paid posts in each of the following 9 ministerial offices.

Salary		Office
MP	Not MP	Office
£68,827	£101,038	Lord Chancellor
£95,772	£105,699	Attorney General for England and Wales
£59,248	£91,755	Solicitor General for England and Wales
£59,248	£91,755	Advocate General for Scotland
£33,002		Treasurer of HM Household
£19,239		Comptroller of HM Household
£19,239		Vice-Chamberlain of HM Household
	£78,891	Captain of the Honourable Corps of Gentlemen-at-Arms
	£68,710	Captain of the King's Bodyguard of the Yeoman of the Guard

The effect of this legislation is that the maximum number of paid ministerial posts is 120 (the maximum was 109 before 29 April 2026). The only limit on the number of unpaid ministerial posts is that the maximum number of MPs who can be appointed to a ministerial post is 95 (whether paid or unpaid).

==== Opposition leaders and whips ====
There can be up to 6 paid posts across the following opposition offices.

Salary		Office
MP	Not MP	Office
£63,098		Leader of the Opposition in the House of Commons
	£68,710	Leader of the Opposition in the House of Lords
£33,002		Opposition Chief Whip in the House of Commons
	£63,537	Opposition Chief Whip in the House of Lords
£19,239		Assistant Opposition Whip, House of Commons

==== Speakers in the House of Commons and the House of Lords ====
There can be 1 paid speaker in each House.

Salary		Office
MP	Not MP	Office
£75,776		Speaker of the House of Commons
	£101,038	Lord Speaker

=== Limits ===
The act (as amended in 2026) explicitly imposes the following limits on the number of government and opposition office holders who can be paid.

Offices	Limit
Prime Minister and First Lord of the Treasury; Chancellor of the Exchequer; Secretaries of State; Lord President of the Council (if a member of the Cabinet); Lord Privy Seal (if a member of the Cabinet); Chancellor of the Duchy of Lancaster (if a member of the Cabinet); Paymaster General (if a member of the Cabinet); Chief Secretary to the Treasury (if a member of the Cabinet); Parliamentary Secretary to the Treasury (if a member of the Cabinet); Ministers of State (if a member of the Cabinet)	22
Prime Minister and First Lord of the Treasury; Chancellor of the Exchequer; Secretaries of State; Lord President of the Council; Lord Privy Seal; Chancellor of the Duchy of Lancaster; Paymaster General; Chief Secretary to the Treasury; Parliamentary Secretary to the Treasury; Ministers of State; Ministers in charge of government departments who are not a member of the Cabinet and who are not eligible for a salary under any other part of the act; Financial Secretary to the Treasury	54
Prime Minister and First Lord of the Treasury; Chancellor of the Exchequer; Secretaries of State; Lord President of the Council; Lord Privy Seal; Chancellor of the Duchy of Lancaster; Paymaster General; Chief Secretary to the Treasury; Parliamentary Secretary to the Treasury; Ministers of State; Ministers in charge of government departments who are not a member of the Cabinet and who are not eligible for a salary under any other part of the act; Financial Secretary to the Treasury; Parliamentary Secretaries (other than Parliamentary Secretary to the Treasury)	94
Junior Lords of the Treasury	5
Assistant Government Whips, House of Commons	7
Lords- and Baronesses-in-waiting	5
Assistant Opposition Whips, House of Commons	2

=== Repealed enactments ===
Section 5(3) of the act repealed 2 enactments, listed in schedule 3 to the act.

Enactments repealed by section 5(3)
Citation	Short title	Extent of repeal
1972 c. 3	Ministerial and Other Salaries Act 1972	The whole act.
1974 c. 21	Ministers of the Crown Act 1974	Section 1.

== See also ==
- House of Commons Disqualification Act 1975
- Ministerial and other Maternity Allowances Act 2021
