= Slaughter of Animals Act 1958 =

Act of the Parliament of the United Kingdom

Slaughter of Animals Act 1958 (Note: Section 13(1).)
- Act of Parliament
- Parliament of the United Kingdom
- Long title: An Act to consolidate certain enactments relating to the slaughter of animals.
- Citation: 7 & 8 Eliz. 2. c. 8
- Territorial extent: England and Wales (Note: Section 13(2).)

Dates
- Royal assent: 18 December 1958
- Commencement: 18 January 1959 (Note: Section 13(3).)
- Repealed: 1 April 1974
Other legislation
Amends	See § Repealed enactments
Repeals/revokes	See § Repealed enactments
Amended by	London Government Act 1963; Statute Law (Repeals) Act 1974
Repealed by	Slaughterhouses Act 1974

Status: Repealed

Text of statute as originally enacted

The Slaughter of Animals Act 1958 (7 & 8 Eliz. 2. c. 8) was an act of the Parliament of the United Kingdom that consolidated enactments related to the slaughter of animals in England and Wales.

== Provisions ==
=== Repealed enactments ===
Section 12(1) of the act repealed 4 enactments, listed in the third schedule to the act.

Citation	Short title	Extent of repeal
23 & 24 Geo. 5. c. 39	Slaughter of Animals Act 1933	The whole act.
1 & 2 Eliz. 2. c. 27	Slaughter of Animals (Pigs) Act 1953	The whole act.
2 & 3 Eliz. 2. c. 59	Slaughter of Animals (Amendment) Act 1954	Sections two to nine. In section ten, subsection (2). In section eleven, subsection (2). In section twelve, subsection (2). The First Schedule. In the Second Schedule, in Part I, the entries relating to the Slaughter of Animals Act 1933.
6 & 7 Eliz. 2. c. 70	Slaughterhouses Act 1958	Section eight. In section nine, in subsection (1), the words "or by virtue of". In section thirteen, the proviso to subsection (1). The Second Schedule.

== Subsequent developments ==
The whole act was repealed by section 47(2) of, and schedule 6 to, the Slaughterhouses Act 1974, which came into operation on 1 April 1974.

Section 12(1) of, and schedule 3 to, the act were repealed by section 1 of, and part XI of the schedule to, the Statute Law (Repeals) Act 1974, which came into force on 27 June 1974.
