= House of Commons (Disqualifications) Act 1801 =

Act of the Parliament of the United Kingdom

House of Commons (Disqualifications) Act 1801 (Note: The citation of this act by this short title was authorised by section 1 of, and the first schedule to, the Short Titles Act 1896. Due to the repeal of those provisions, it is now authorised by section 19(2) of the Interpretation Act 1978.)
- Act of Parliament
- Parliament of the United Kingdom
- Long title: An Act for declaring what Persons shall be disabled from sitting and voting in the House of Commons of the United Kingdom of Great Britain and Ireland; and also for carrying into effect Part of the Fourth Article of the Union of Great Britain and Ireland, by providing in what cases Persons holding Offices or Places of Profit under the Crown of Ireland shall be incapable of being Members of the House of Commons of the Parliament of the said United Kingdom.
- Citation: 41 Geo. 3. (U.K.) c. 52
- Territorial extent: United Kingdom

Dates
- Royal assent: 20 June 1801
- Commencement: 20 June 1801 (Note: Section 1.)
- Repealed: 11 May 2001
Other legislation
Amended by	Statute Law Revision Act 1872; Statute Law Revision Act 1888; Statute Law Revision Act 1950; House of Commons Disqualification Act 1957
Repealed by	House of Commons (Removal of Clergy Disqualification) Act 2001

Status: Repealed

Text of statute as originally enacted

Revised text of statute as amended

The House of Commons (Disqualifications) Act 1801 (41 Geo. 3. (U.K.) c. 52) was an act of the Parliament of the United Kingdom that prohibits certain categories of people from becoming members of the House of Commons.

== Subsequent developments ==
Section 9 of the act was repealed by section 1(1) of, and the first schedule to, the Statute Law Revision Act 1950 (14 Geo. 6. c. 6), which came into force on 23 May 1950.

The whole act was repealed by section 1(3)(b) of the House of Commons (Removal of Clergy Disqualification) Act 2001, which came into force on 11 May 2001.
