= Ministerial Salaries Consolidation Act 1965 =

Act of the Parliament of the United Kingdom

Ministerial Salaries Consolidation Act 1965 (Note: Section 10.)
- Act of Parliament
- Parliament of the United Kingdom
- Long title: An Act to consolidate the enactments relating to the salaries of Ministers, the pensions of Prime Ministers, the salaries of Opposition Leaders and Chief Whips and other matters connected therewith.
- Citation: 1965 c. 58
- Territorial extent: United Kingdom

Dates
- Royal assent: 5 August 1965
- Commencement: 5 August 1965 (Note: The Acts of Parliament (Commencement) Act 1793.)
- Repealed: 10 February 1972
Other legislation
Amends	See § Repealed enactments
Repeals/revokes	See § Repealed enactments
Amended by	Pensions (Increase) Act 1971; Ministerial and other Salaries Act 1972
Repealed by	Parliamentary and Other Pensions Act 1972
Relates to	Ministerial Salaries and Members' Pensions Act 1965

Status: Repealed

Text of statute as originally enacted

The Ministerial Salaries Consolidation Act 1965 (c. 58) was an act of the Parliament of the United Kingdom. It repealed the Ministers of the Crown Act 1937 (1 Edw. 8. & 1 Geo. 6. c. 38), which is notable for first providing a legal definition of the Leader of the Opposition.

== Provisions ==
=== Repealed enactments ===
Section 9(1) of the act repealed 8 enactments, listed in schedule 2 to the act.

Enactments repealed by section 9(1)
Citation	Short title	Extent of repeal
26 Geo. 5 & 1 Edw. 8. c. 15	Civil List Act 1936	Section 9.
1 Edw. 8 & 1 Geo. 6. c. 38	Ministers of the Crown Act 1937	The whole act.
6 & 7 Geo. 6. c. 5	Minister of Town and Country Planning Act 1943	Section 9 so far as it relates to the salary of the Minister.
8 & 9 Geo. 6. c. 19	Ministry of Fuel and Power Act 1945	Section 3(3) so far as it relates to the salary of the Minister.
8 & 9 Geo. 6. c. 19	Ministry of Fuel and Power Act 1945	Section 7(1).
8 & 9 Geo. 6. c. 19	Ministry of Fuel and Power Act 1945	Schedule 2.
9 & 10 Geo. 6. c. 55	Ministerial Salaries Act 1946	The whole act.
5 & 6 Eliz. 2. c. 47	Ministerial Salaries Act 1957	The whole act.
1964 c. 98	Ministers of the Crown Act 1964	Section 2.
1965 c. 11	Ministerial Salaries and Members' Pensions Act 1965	Sections 1 and 2, section 16, Schedule 1 and so much of Schedule 4 as amends the Ministers of the Crown Act 1937.

== Subsequent developments ==
The whole act, except sections 3, 6, 7(3) with the omission of the words preceding "any pension", 9(3) 10, was repealed by section 1(6) of, and schedule 4 to, the Ministerial and other Salaries Act 1972, which came into force on 1 April 1972.

The whole act was repealed by section 36(1) of, and schedule 4 to, the Parliamentary and Other Pensions Act 1972, which came into force on 27 July 1972.
