= Northern Ireland Assembly Disqualification Act 1975 =

Act of the Parliament of the United Kingdom

Northern Ireland Assembly Disqualification Act 1975 (Note: Section 6.)
- Act of Parliament
- Parliament of the United Kingdom
- Long title: An Act to consolidate certain enactments relating to disqualification for membership of the Northern Ireland Assembly.
- Citation: 1975 c. 25
- Territorial extent: United Kingdom

Dates
- Royal assent: 8 May 1975
- Commencement: 8 May 1975 (Note: The Acts of Parliament (Commencement) Act 1793.)

Other legislation
- Amends: Northern Ireland Assembly Act 1973
- Repeals/revokes: See § Provisions
- Amended by: Statute Law (Repeals) Act 1976; Statute Law (Repeals) Act 1977; Judicature (Northern Ireland) Act 1978; Reserve Forces (Safeguard of Employment) Act 1985; Pilotage Act 1987; Social Security (Consequential Provisions) (Northern Ireland) Act 1992; Trade Union Reform and Employment Rights Act 1993; Statute Law (Repeals) Act 1993; Northern Ireland Act 1998; Political Parties, Elections and Referendums Act 2000; Disqualifications Act 2000; Statute Law (Repeals) Act 2004; Serious Organised Crime and Police Act 2005; Child Maintenance and Other Payments Act 2008; Armed Forces Act 2006; Constitutional Reform and Governance Act 2010; Police Reform and Social Responsibility Act 2011; Charities Act 2011; Statute Law (Repeals) Act 2013; Northern Ireland (Miscellaneous Provisions) Act 2014
- Relates to: House of Commons Disqualification Act 1975; Ministers of the Crown Act 1975; Ministerial and other Salaries Act 1975

Status: Amended

Text of statute as originally enacted

Revised text of statute as amended

Text of the Northern Ireland Assembly Disqualification Act 1975 as in force today (including any amendments) within the United Kingdom, from legislation.gov.uk.

The Northern Ireland Assembly Disqualification Act 1975 (c. 25) is an act of the Parliament of the United Kingdom that consolidated enactments relating to disqualification for membership of the Northern Ireland Assembly. It was passed on the same day as the companion House of Commons Disqualification Act 1975, which consolidated the equivalent provisions governing membership of the House of Commons.

== Provisions ==
=== Repealed enactments ===
Section 5(2) of the act repealed 60 enactments and the relevant provisions of 8 Orders in Council, listed in parts I and II, and part III, of schedule 3 to the act, so far as they applied in relation to disqualification for membership of the Northern Ireland Assembly.

Part I – Enactments of the Parliament of the United Kingdom
| Citation | Short title | Extent of repeal |
|---|---|---|
| 5 & 6 Eliz. 2. c. 20 | House of Commons Disqualification Act 1957 | The whole act, except section 2(3). |
| 6 & 7 Eliz. 2. c. 66 | Tribunals and Inquiries Act 1958 | The whole act, so far as unrepealed. |
| 7 & 8 Eliz. 2. c. 69 | Wages Councils Act 1959 | Section 25. In section 27(3), the words "Save as otherwise expressly provided". |
| 8 & 9 Eliz. 2. c. 18 | Local Employment Act 1960 | Section 11. |
| 10 & 11 Eliz. 2. c. 46 | Transport Act 1962 | Section 85. In Part I of Schedule 11, the words "section eighty-five" and the words "and the House of Commons Disqualification Act 1957". |
| 1963 c. 33 | London Government Act 1963 | Section 92. In section 94, in subsection (3) the words "and section 92" and the words from "and the repeals" to "Act 1957" and in subsection (4) the words from the beginning to "said repeals" and the words "other than this subsection". |
| 1963 c. 40 | Commonwealth Development Act 1963 | Section 1(4). |
| 1964 c. 14 | Plant Varieties and Seeds Act 1964 | In Schedule 4, paragraph 4. |
| 1964 c. 25 | War Damage Act 1964 | Section 13(4). |
| 1964 c. 98 | Ministers of the Crown Act 1964 | Section 5(2). |
| 1965 c. 10 | Superannuation (Amendment) Act 1965 | In Schedule 1, the entry relating to the House of Commons Disqualification Act 1957. |
| 1965 c. 14 | Cereals Marketing Act 1965 | In Schedule 1, paragraph 12. |
| 1965 c. 22 | Law Commissions Act 1965 | Section 6(1). |
| 1966 c. 6 | National Insurance Act 1966 | Section 13(2). |
| 1966 c. 20 | Ministry of Social Security Act 1966 | In section 40(4) the words "the House of Commons Disqualification Act 1957". In Schedule 1, paragraph 7. |
| 1966 c. 34 | Industrial Development Act 1966 | In section 21(6), the words from "except" to "disqualification)". In section 31(7), paragraph (5) and the word "and" immediately preceding it. In Schedule 3, in Part II, the entry relating to the House of Commons Disqualification Act 1957. |
| 1967 c. 13 | Parliamentary Commissioner Act 1967 | Section 1(4). |
| 1967 c. 22 | Agriculture Act 1967 | Section 73. |
| 1968 c. 24 | Commonwealth Telecommunications Act 1968 | Section 2(8). |
| 1968 c. 67 | Medicines Act 1968 | Section 2(6). |
| 1968 c. 71 | Race Relations Act 1968 | In section 29(4), the words from "except" to "Act 1957". In Schedule 1, paragraph 12. |
| 1968 c. 73 | Transport Act 1968 | Section 155. In Schedule 17, in Part I, the words "155" and the words from "and so far" to "Part I". |
| 1969 c. 35 | Transport (London) Act 1969 | In section 47(4), the words from the beginning to "Act 1957". |
| 1970 c. 40 | Agriculture Act 1970 | In Schedule 1, paragraph 12. |
| 1971 c. 23 | Courts Act 1971 | Section 17(5). In section 59(6), paragraph (6). |
| 1971 c. 58 | Sheriff Courts (Scotland) Act 1971 | Section 21. In section 47(3), the words from "and section" to "Act 1957)". |
| 1971 c. 75 | Civil Aviation Act 1971 | Section 1(5). Section 37(5). |
| 1971 c. 77 | Immigration Act 1971 | In Schedule 5, paragraphs 4 and 10. |
| 1972 c. 41 | Finance Act 1972 | In Schedule 6, paragraph 8. |
| 1972 c. 58 | National Health Service (Scotland) Act 1972 | Section 42(4). In section 65(4) the words "42(4)". |
| 1972 c. 68 | European Communities Act 1972 | In Schedule 4, paragraph 5(6). |
| 1972 c. 70 | Local Government Act 1972 | Section 268. In section 274, in subsection (2) the words "section 268 above" and the words from "and the repeals" to "that Act" and in subsection (3) the words from the beginning to "said repeals". |
| 1973 c. 9 | Counter-Inflation Act 1973 | In Schedule 1, paragraph 9. |
| 1973 c. 32 | National Health Service Reorganisation Act 1973 | In Schedule 4, paragraph 79 and in paragraph 148 the words "42(4)". |
| 1973 c. 36 | Northern Ireland Constitution Act 1973 | In section 30, subsections (1) and (2) and in subsection (3) the words from "and in subsection (3)" to the end. |
| 1973 c. 38 | Social Security Act 1973 | Section 66(3). Section 73(5). In Schedule 27, paragraph 18. |
| 1973 c. 41 | Fair Trading Act 1973 | In Schedule 1, paragraph 4. |
| 1974 c. 7 | Local Government Act 1974 | In section 43(6) the words from "Except" to "Act 1957". In Schedule 4, paragraph 12. |
| 1974 c. 24 | Prices Act 1974 | Section 6(3). |
| 1974 c. 52 | Trade Union and Labour Relations Act 1974 | In section 31(5), the words "the House of Commons Disqualification Act 1957". In Schedule 3, paragraph 6. |
| 1975 c. 18 | Social Security (Consequential Provisions) Act 1975 | In Schedule 2, paragraph 12. |

Part II – Enactments of the Parliament of Northern Ireland
| Citation | Short title | Extent of repeal |
|---|---|---|
| 1958 c. 7 (N.I.) | Ulster Folk Museum Act (Northern Ireland) 1958 | Section 4(4). |
| 1959 c. 15 (N.I.) | Coroners Act (Northern Ireland) 1959 | Section 37. |
| 1961 c. 15 (N.I.) | Mental Health Act (Northern Ireland) 1961 | Section 76(3). |
| 1962 c. 14 (N.I.) | Electoral Law Act (Northern Ireland) 1962 | Section 14(3). |
| 1964 c. 18 (N.I.) | Industrial Training Act (Northern Ireland) 1964 | Section 15. |
| 1964 c. 29 (N.I.) | Lands Tribunal and Compensation Act (Northern Ireland) 1964 | Section 12(3). |
| 1965 c. 13 (N.I.) | New Towns Act (Northern Ireland) 1965 | Section 7(3). |
| 1966 c. 17 (N.I.) | Fisheries Act (Northern Ireland) 1966 | Section 25(4). |
| 1966 c. 28 (N.I.) | Supplementary Benefits &c. Act (Northern Ireland) 1966 | In Schedule 1, paragraph 7. |
| 1966 c. 43 (N.I.) | Agricultural Trust Act (Northern Ireland) 1966 | In the Schedule, paragraph 13. |
| 1967 c. 21 (N.I.) | Livestock Marketing Commission Act (Northern Ireland) 1967 | In the Schedule, in Part II, paragraph 7. |
| 1967 c. 37 (N.I.) | Transport Act (Northern Ireland) 1967 | Section 53(6). |
| 1969 c. 10 (N.I.) | Parliamentary Commissioner Act (Northern Ireland) 1969 | Section 1(4). |
| 1969 c. 25 (N.I.) | Commissioner for Complaints Act (Northern Ireland) 1969 | Section 1(4). |
| 1970 c. 9 (N.I.) | Police Act (Northern Ireland) 1970 | In Schedule 1, paragraph 17. |
| 1970 c. 28 (N.I.) | National Insurance (Old Persons' and Widows' Pensions and Attendance Allowance) Act (Northern Ireland) 1970 | In Schedule 2, in Part I, paragraph 1. |
| 1971 c. 5 (N.I.) | Housing Executive Act (Northern Ireland) 1971 | In Schedule 1, paragraph 10(1). |
| 1971 c. 9 (N.I.) | Local Government (Boundaries) Act (Northern Ireland) 1971 | Section 3(4). |
| 1972 c. 9 (N.I.) | Local Government Act (Northern Ireland) 1972 | In Schedule 8, paragraphs 13 and 14. |

Part III – Orders in Council under section 1(3) of the Northern Ireland (Temporary Provisions) Act 1972
| Citation | Title | Extent of repeal |
|---|---|---|
| SI 1972/731 (N.I. 4) | Northern Ireland Finance Corporation (Northern Ireland) Order 1972 | In the Schedule, paragraph 5(1). |
| SI 1972/1072 (N.I. 9) | Electricity Supply (Northern Ireland) Order 1972 | In Schedule 1, paragraph 7(1). In Schedule 2, paragraph 7. |
| SI 1972/1264 (N.I. 13) | Electoral Law (Northern Ireland) Order 1972 | In Article 6, the words from "(3) In the Part" to "Chief Electoral Officer for Northern Ireland". |
| SI 1972/1265 (N.I. 14) | Health and Personal Social Services (Northern Ireland) Order 1972 | In Schedule 16, paragraph 19. |
| SI 1972/1634 (N.I. 17) | Planning (Northern Ireland) Order 1972 | In Schedule 3, paragraph 1(4). |
| SI 1973/70 (N.I. 2) | Water and Sewerage Services (Northern Ireland) Order 1973 | In Schedule 1, paragraph 1(4). |
| SI 1973/601 (N.I. 9) | Fire Services (Northern Ireland) Order 1973 | Article 3(4). |
| SI 1973/1228 (N.I. 16) | Enterprise Ulster (Northern Ireland) Order 1973 | In Schedule 1, paragraph 9(1). |

== Subsequent developments ==
Section 5(2) of, and schedule 3 to, the act were repealed by section 1(1) of, and part XIX of schedule 1 to, the Statute Law (Repeals) Act 1977, which came into force on 16 June 1977.
