= Disqualifications Act 2000 =

Act of the Parliament of the United Kingdom

Disqualifications Act 2000 (Note: Section 5.)
- Act of Parliament
- Parliament of the United Kingdom
- Long title: An Act to remove the disqualification for membership of the House of Commons and the Northern Ireland Assembly of persons who are members of the legislature of Ireland (the Oireachtas); to disqualify for certain offices which may be held by members of the Northern Ireland Assembly persons who are or become Ministers of the Government of Ireland or chairmen or deputy chairmen of committees of the Dáil Éireann or the Seanad Éireann or of joint committees of the Oireachtas; and to make provision with respect to who may be chairman or deputy chairman of a statutory committee of the Assembly or a member of the Northern Ireland Assembly Commission.
- Citation: 2000 c. 42
- Territorial extent: United Kingdom

Dates
- Royal assent: 30 November 2000
- Commencement: 30 November 2000 (Note: Section 4(b) of the Interpretation Act 1978.)
Other legislation
Amends	House of Commons Disqualification Act 1975; Northern Ireland Assembly Disqualification Act 1975; Northern Ireland Act 1998

Status: Current legislation

Text of statute as originally enacted

Revised text of statute as amended

The Disqualifications Act 2000 (c. 42) is an act of the Parliament of the United Kingdom. It gained royal assent on 30 November 2000. The act extends a privilege to Ireland whereby persons elected to sit in its houses of parliament are eligible, if elected/appointed, to sit in a house of the parliament of the United Kingdom also. This privilege is extended to all countries in the Commonwealth of Nations (of which Ireland is not a member).

== Summary of effects of the law ==
The act amended the House of Commons Disqualification Act 1975 and the Northern Ireland Assembly Disqualification Act 1975, which had previously disqualified any person who was a member of a legislature outside the Commonwealth from becoming a member of the Commons or the Assembly, to remove the disqualification from members of the Oireachtas (the Parliament of Ireland).

A specific provision of the Northern Ireland Act 1998 had permitted members of the Seanad Éireann to sit in the Assembly; this section was repealed as obsolete.

It amended the Northern Ireland Act 1998 to state that any Assembly member who was also a minister in the Government of Ireland, or the chair of a committee of the Dáil Éireann, Seanad Éireann or Oireachtas, was not permitted to hold ministerial office or sit on the Northern Ireland Policing Board. In addition, they were not permitted to be the chair of any statutory committee of the Assembly, or members of the Northern Ireland Assembly Commission.

SDLP politician Seamus Mallon was appointed to the Irish Senate but then lost his seat in the then Northern Ireland Assembly after a challenge by Unionists. The amendment in the Northern Ireland Act 1998 rectified this position but the new act went further.

== Background to the Commonwealth privilege ==
All members of sovereign parliaments of Commonwealth countries have a legal entitlement, if they are elected/appointed to sit in a House of Parliament of the United Kingdom. This is a privilege extended to Commonwealth countries under British law. Notwithstanding that this privilege in favour of Commonwealth countries has existed for many years, no member of a Commonwealth parliament has ever been a member of the United Kingdom parliament as well.

Ireland withdrew from the British Commonwealth of Nations in April 1949. With its departure from the Commonwealth, Ireland lost the privilege extended to members of Commonwealth parliaments. Even though the United Kingdom passed the Ireland Act 1949, providing that Ireland would not be treated as a "foreign country" for the purposes of British law, the privilege Ireland had lost was not restored. As such, an anomaly between the way Ireland was treated and the way Commonwealth countries were treated arose. Nevertheless, the issue attracted no attention over the years.

== Background ==
Ireland and the United Kingdom concluded the Belfast Agreement concerning the constitutional position of Northern Ireland in 1998. Among the matters agreed were that Ireland would remove its constitutional claim to the territory of Northern Ireland. With effect from 2 December 1999, this Irish claim was dropped. The Government of the United Kingdom moved quickly to remove the aforementioned anomaly and introduced legislation to extend the privilege of members of the sovereign Irish parliament to also, if elected/appointed, take up seats in the parliament of the United Kingdom.

== Reception ==
The changes proposed under the Disqualification Bill 2000 were the subject of heated debate in the British House of Lords. The Government minister stated that:

The constitutional changes made by the Irish Government are historic and irreversible. They represent the giving up of what has always been regarded in Ireland as very important constitutional provisions....When the Irish constitutional changes took effect on 2nd December, we believed it only right to follow those changes by removing in this Bill one of the last distinctions made in domestic legislation between Ireland and those other countries with which we have an equally warm and special relationship through the Commonwealth.

Chairman of the Ulster Unionist Party, Lord Rogan described the legislation as a "constitutional monstrosity". Unionist members first proposed an amendment to the bill concerning the name used for the Irish state. They argued that the term "the Republic of Ireland" should be used, and not "Ireland". However, the Government did not accept this, stating (see also Names of the Irish state):

[T]he term "Ireland" is used correctly, is unambiguous and is in accordance with established practice. Since the conclusion of the British-Irish agreement in 1998 it has been the practice of both the British Government and Irish Government to refer to "Ireland" rather than "the Republic of Ireland" when the reference is in an international context. To accept the amendments would make the drafting of the bill inconsistent with the practice of the Government in other legislation. Therefore, we oppose the amendment moved....

Next, the substance of the bill was debated at length. Opposition peers argued that permitting a member of the parliament of Ireland to simultaneously serve as a member of the parliament of the United Kingdom left room for a conflict of interest to emerge. The Shadow Secretary of State for Northern Ireland described the legislation as "dangerous". They argued that this law would benefit only Sinn Féin and that they might use the new law to send its Members of Parliament to sit in Dáil Éireann and speak for their constituents in the United Kingdom in Dáil Éireann and that "would be huge step towards a United Ireland by stealth".

These arguments were not accepted. However, the arguments that Irish government ministers and chairmen of committees of the Irish parliament should not be permitted to serve as ministers in the United Kingdom were accepted.
