= Ministers of the Crown Act 1937 =

Act of the Parliament of the United Kingdom

Ministers of the Crown Act 1937 (Note: Section 12.)
- Act of Parliament
- Parliament of the United Kingdom
- Long title: An Act to regulate the salaries payable in respect of certain Administrative Offices of State; to provide for the payment of additional salaries to members of the Cabinet holding offices at salaries less than five thousand pounds a year, of a salary to any person being Prime Minister, of pensions to persons who have been Prime Minister, and of a salary to any person being Leader of the Opposition; to simplify the law as to the capacity of persons holding offices of profit to sit and vote in Parliament; and for purposes connected with the matters aforesaid.
- Citation: 1 Edw. 8. & 1 Geo. 6. c. 38
- Territorial extent: United Kingdom

Dates
- Royal assent: 1 July 1937
- Commencement: 1 July 1937 (Note: The Acts of Parliament (Commencement) Act 1793.)
- Repealed: 5 August 1965
Other legislation
Repeals/revokes	Government of India Act 1858
Amended by	Statute Law Revision Act 1963
Repealed by	Ministerial Salaries Consolidation Act 1965

Status: Repealed

Text of statute as originally enacted

The Ministers of the Crown Act 1937 (1 Edw. 8. & 1 Geo. 6. c. 38) was an act of the Parliament of the United Kingdom that set salaries for members of the government and opposition. It is notable as the first act to formally recognise the prime minister, the Cabinet and the Leader of the Opposition.

== Provisions ==
The act set out salaries for government ministers and certain members of the opposition. Although applying to "ministers" it did not define ministers and indeed excluded two of them: the Lord Chancellor and Attorney General for England and Wales. The act first gave the salary for the prime minister, which was set at £10,000 a year. (Note: £10,000 in 1937 would be worth approximately £589,000 in 2025) This was only the second time that the Prime Minister had been mentioned in an act of Parliament, after the Chequers Estate Act 1917 (7 & 8 Geo. 5. c. 55), which granted them a country residence at Chequers.

The other officials covered by the act fell into two categories – heads of department, and under-secretaries. Heads of certain departments, such as the Chancellor of the Exchequer, received £5,000 (Note: £5,000 in 1937 would be worth approximately £294,000 in 2025) a year regardless of their membership in the Cabinet, while others such as the Lord Privy Seal received £3,000, (Note: £3,000 in 1937 would be worth approximately £177,000 in 2025) with an increase to £5,000 if they come to sit in the Cabinet. The under-secretaries were granted £3,000 a year if Chief Whip, £2,000 (Note: £2,000 in 1937 would be worth approximately £118,000 in 2025) if Financial Secretary to the Treasury, £1,500 (Note: £1,500 in 1937 would be worth approximately £88,000 in 2025) if Financial Secretary to the Admiralty or similar and £1,000 (Note: £1,000 in 1937 would be worth approximately £59,000 in 2025) if Assistant Postmaster-General. The act also gave a pension of £2,000 a year to any individual who had served as Prime Minister, and a salary of £2,000 to the Leader of the Opposition.

The act is notable for several reasons; it was the first act of Parliament to directly deal with ministerial salaries, and also the first act to provide a salary for the prime minister, and for the Leader of the Opposition, whose duties it defined. It was the first statute to formally recognise the prime minister, the Cabinet and the Leader of the Opposition. The act was repealed by the Ministerial Salaries Consolidation Act 1965.

== Subsequent developments ==
The whole act was repealed by section 9(1) of, and schedule 3 to, the Ministerial Salaries Consolidation Act 1965, which came into force on 5 August 1965.

== Notes ==
UK CPI inflation numbers based on data available from Measuring Worth: UK CPI

== Bibliography ==
- Brazier, Rodney (1997). Ministers of the Crown. Oxford University Press. ISBN 0-19-825988-3.
- Mowat, Charles Loch (1978). Britain between the wars: 1918–1940. Taylor & Francis. ISBN 0-416-29510-X.
