= House of Commons Disqualification Act 1957 =

Act of the Parliament of the United Kingdom

House of Commons Disqualification Act 1957 (Note: Section 15.)
- Act of Parliament
- Parliament of the United Kingdom
- Long title: An Act to make provision for disqualifying the holders of specified offices for membership of the House of Commons, and to repeal the enactments providing for the disqualification of the holders of offices or places of profit under the Crown and other offices, of persons having pensions from the Crown and of persons contracting with the Crown for or on account of the public service, and certain enactments disqualifying members of that House for holding other offices; to make corresponding provision in respect of the Senate and House of Commons of Northern Ireland; and for purposes connected with the matters aforesaid.
- Citation: 5 & 6 Eliz. 2. c. 20
- Territorial extent: United Kingdom

Dates
- Royal assent: 17 April 1957
- Commencement: 17 April 1957 (Note: The Acts of Parliament (Commencement) Act 1793.)
- Repealed: 8 May 1975
Other legislation
Amends	Succession to the Crown Act 1707; Civil List and Secret Service Money Act 1782; House of Commons (Disqualifications) Act 1801; Metropolitan Police Act 1829; Paymaster General Act 1835; City of London Police Act 1839; Metropolitan Police Act 1856; South Staffordshire Stipendiary Justice Act 1899; Iron and Steel Act 1953
Repeals/revokes	House of Commons (Disqualification) Act 1693; Taxation of Members of Parliament Act 1700; Crown Pensioners Disqualification Act 1715; House of Commons Disqualification Act 1741; Excise Management Act 1827
Amended by	Electricity Act 1957; Charities Act 1960; Mental Health (Scotland) Act 1960; London Government Act 1963; Science and Technology Act 1965; Law Commissions Act 1965; Statute Law Revision (Consequential Repeals) Act 1965; Race Relations Act 1965; Parliamentary Commissioner Act 1967; Local Government (Termination of Reviews) Act 1967; Race Relations Act 1968; Courts Act 1971; Civil Aviation Act 1971; Town and Country Planning Act 1971; Town and Country Planning (Scotland) Act 1972; National Health Service (Scotland) Act 1972; Gas Act 1972; Statute Law (Repeals) Act 1973
Repealed by	House of Commons Disqualification Act 1975; Northern Ireland Assembly Disqualification Act 1975; Ministers of the Crown Act 1975

Status: Repealed

Text of statute as originally enacted

The House of Commons Disqualification Act 1957 (5 & 6 Eliz. 2. c. 20) was an act of the Parliament of the United Kingdom that prohibits certain categories of people from becoming members of the House of Commons.

== Subsequent developments ==
Section 14(1) and (2) of, andin Part I of schedule 1, the words " Umpire or Deputy Umpire appointed for the purposes of the Old Age Pensions Act (Northern Ireland) 1936 ". In Part II of Schedule 1, the words " The Consumer Council ", the words " The Iron and Steel Holding and Realisation Agency " and the words " The Sites Commission constituted under the Industries Development Act (Northern Ireland) 1945 ". In Part III of Schedule 1, in the entry beginning " Chairman or Reserve Chairman of a Local Tribunal constituted for the purposes of the National Insurance Act 1965 " the words " or the National Insurance (Industrial Injuries) Act 1965 ", and the words " Chairman of the Post Office Users' Council ". In Part II of Schedule 1 as substituted by Schedule 3 (Northern Ireland), the words " The Consumer Council ", the words " The Iron and Steel Holding and Realisation Agency ", the words " The Sites Commission constituted under the Industries Development Act (Northern Ireland) 1945 ", the words " The Transport Tribunal for Northern Ireland " and the words " The Ulster Transport Authority ". In Part III of Schedule 1 as substituted by Schedule 3 (Northern Ireland), the words " Chairman of the Post Office Users' Council " and schedule 4 to, the act were repealed by section 1(1) of, and part XIII of schedule 1 to, the Statute Law (Repeals) Act 1973, which came into force on 18 July 1973.

The whole act, so far as unrepealed, was repealed by section 10(2) of, and schedule 3 to, the House of Commons Disqualification Act 1975, which came into force on 8 May 1875.

The whole act, except section 2(3), was repealed by section 5(2) of, and part I of schedule 3 to, the Northern Ireland Assembly Disqualification Act 1975, which came into force on 8 May 1875.

The whole act, so far as unrepealed, was repealed by section 8(4) of, and schedule 3 to, the Ministers of the Crown Act 1975, which came into force on 8 May 1875.
