= List of acts of the Parliament of the United Kingdom from 1974 =

This is a list of acts of the Parliament of the United Kingdom passed in 1974.

Acts passed since 1963 are cited by calendar year, as opposed to the convention used for earlier acts of citing the regnal year(s) in which the relevant parliamentary session was held. Each act passed in a respective year is given a chapter number (abbreviated "c."), denoted by Arabic numerals in the case of public general acts, lowercase Roman numerals in the case of local acts, or italicised Arabic numerals in the case of personal acts. These run as separate series.

95 acts of Parliament were passed in 1974: 58 public general acts and 37 local acts.

indicates that an act has been transcribed on Wikisource, indicates that an act is available to view at legislation.gov.uk, and indicates the location of the original act in the Parliamentary Archives.

== Public general acts ==
Short title	Citation	Royal assent
Long title
Consolidated Fund Act 1974	1974 c. 1	22 January 1974
An Act to apply certain sums out of the Consolidated Fund to the service of the years ending on 31st March 1974 and 1975.
Appropriation Act 1974	1974 c. 2	8 February 1974
An Act to appropriate the supplies granted in this Session of Parliament.
Slaughterhouses Act 1974	1974 c. 3	8 February 1974
An Act to consolidate certain enactments relating to slaughterhouses and knackers' yards and the slaughter of animals.
Legal Aid Act 1974	1974 c. 4	8 February 1974
An Act to consolidate certain enactments relating to legal aid and legal advice and assistance.
Horticulture (Special Payments) Act 1974 (repealed)	1974 c. 5	8 February 1974
An Act to authorise payments out of moneys provided by Parliament to assist certain commercial growers of horticultural produce, the growing of which has become uneconomic as a result of the United Kingdom's membership of the European Economic Community. (Repealed by Statute Law (Repeals) Act 2004 (c. 14))
Biological Weapons Act 1974	1974 c. 6	8 February 1974
An Act to prohibit the development, production, acquisition and possession of certain biological agents and toxins and of biological weapons.
Local Government Act 1974	1974 c. 7	8 February 1974
An Act to make further provision, in relation to England and Wales, with respect to the payment of grants to local authorities, rating and valuation, borrowing and lending by local authorities and the classification of highways; to extend the powers of the Countryside Commission to give financial assistance; to provide for the establishment of Commissions for the investigation of administrative action taken by or on behalf of local and other authorities; to restrict certain grants under the Transport Act 1968; (Note: Transport Act 1968 (c. 73)) to provide for the removal or relaxation of certain statutory controls affecting local government activities; to make provision in relation to the collection of sums by local authorities on behalf of water authorities; to amend section 259(3) of the Local Government Act 1972 (Note: Local Government Act 1972 (c. 70)) and to make certain minor amendments of or consequential on that Act; and for connected purposes.
Statutory Corporations (Financial Provisions) Act 1974	1974 c. 8	8 February 1974
An Act to make provision for compensating certain statutory corporations in respect of financial loss due to compliance with the national policy relating to limitation of prices, and for extending the borrowing powers of certain statutory corporations; and for purposes connected with those matters.
Pensions (Increase) Act 1974	1974 c. 9	8 February 1974
An Act to provide for increases of certain official pensions and to amend the Pensions (Increase) Act 1971; (Note: Pensions (Increase) Act 1971 (c. 56)) and for purposes connected therewith.
Representation of the People Act 1974	1974 c. 10	8 February 1974
An Act to increase the limits on candidates' election expenses at elections to the Parliament of the United Kingdom, and for connected purposes.
Charlwood and Horley Act 1974	1974 c. 11	8 February 1974
An Act to transfer parts of the new parishes of Charlwood and Horley to the new county of Surrey, and for connected purposes.
Consolidated Fund (No. 2) Act 1974	1974 c. 12	21 March 1974
An Act to apply a sum out of the Consolidated Fund to the service of the year ending on 31st March 1974.
Representation of the People (No. 2) Act 1974	1974 c. 13	10 April 1974
An Act to increase the limits on candidates' election expenses at certain local government elections in Great Britain.
National Insurance Act 1974	1974 c. 14	13 May 1974
An Act to amend the provisions of the National Insurance Acts 1965 to 1973, the National Insurance (Industrial Injuries) Acts 1965 to 1973 and the Industrial Injuries and Diseases (Old Cases) Acts 1967 to 1973 as to the rate or amount of benefit and contributions; to amend section 39 of the Social Security Act 1973 (Note: Social Security Act 1973 (c. 38)) and to make minor amendments of certain other enactments relating to social security; and for purposes connected with those matters.
Consolidated Fund (No. 3) Act 1974	1974 c. 15	23 May 1974
An Act to apply a sum out of the Consolidated Fund to the service of the year ending on 31st March 1975.
Independent Broadcasting Authority Act 1974 (repealed)	1974 c. 16	23 May 1974
An Act to make further provision as to the payments to be made to the Independent Broadcasting Authority by television programme contractors; and for purposes connected therewith. (Repealed by Broadcasting Act 1981 (c. 68))
Rabies Act 1974 (repealed)	1974 c. 17	23 May 1974
An Act to make further provision for the prevention and control of rabies, and for connected purposes. (Repealed by Animal Health Act 1981 (c. 22))
Contingencies Fund Act 1974	1974 c. 18	23 May 1974
An Act to make new provision with respect to the maximum capital of the Contingencies Fund.
Lord High Commissioner (Church of Scotland) Act 1974	1974 c. 19	27 June 1974
An Act to empower the Secretary of State, with the concurrence of the Treasury, to pay an allowance in respect of the expenses attributable to the office of Her Majesty's High Commissioner to the General Assembly of the Church of Scotland of an amount which from time to time the Secretary of State may think appropriate.
Dumping at Sea Act 1974	1974 c. 20	27 June 1974
An Act to control dumping in the sea.
Ministers of the Crown Act 1974 (repealed)	1974 c. 21	27 June 1974
An Act to amend the Ministerial and Other Salaries Act 1972 (Note: Ministerial and Other Salaries Act 1972 (c. 3)) and other provisions about Ministers of the Crown. (Repealed by House of Commons Disqualification Act 1975 (c. 24), Northern Ireland Assembly Disqualification Act 1975 (c. 25) and Ministers of the Crown Act 1975 (c. 26))
Statute Law (Repeals) Act 1974	1974 c. 22	27 June 1974
An Act to promote the reform of the statute law by the repeal, in accordance with recommendations of the Law Commission and the Scottish Law Commission, of certain enactments which (except in so far as their effect is preserved) are no longer of practical utility.
Juries Act 1974	1974 c. 23	9 July 1974
An Act to consolidate certain enactments relating to juries, jurors and jury service with corrections and improvements made under the Consolidation of Enactments (Procedure) Act 1949. (Note: Consolidation of Enactments (Procedure) Act 1949 (12, 13 & 14 Geo. 6. c. 33))
Prices Act 1974	1974 c. 24	9 July 1974
An Act to authorise the payment of food subsidies; to confer on the Secretary of State power to regulate the price of food and certain other goods and on the Price Commission additional powers for preventing or restricting increases in prices and charges; to make provision for requiring prices to be indicated on or in relation to goods offered or exposed for sale by retail and for requiring information as to the range within which food and certain other goods are commonly being sold by retail within the United Kingdom to be displayed by retailers dealing in those goods; to confer power to abolish the Pay Board; and for purposes connected with those matters.
Lord Chancellor (Tenure of Office and Discharge of Ecclesiastical Functions) Act 1974	1974 c. 25	9 July 1974
An Act to declare the law relating to the tenure of the office of Lord Chancellor by Roman Catholics and to make provision for the exercise of ecclesiastical functions during any tenure of the office of Lord Chancellor by Roman Catholics.
Solicitors (Amendment) Act 1974 (repealed)	1974 c. 26	17 July 1974
An Act to prevent non-British subjects being prohibited from becoming or practising as solicitors; to amend the Solicitors Acts 1957 to 1965; to make further provision as to the powers of The Law Society to intervene in a solicitor's practice, the termination of a solicitor's retainer and the administration of oaths and taking of affidavits; and for connected purposes. (Repealed by Solicitors Act 1974 (c. 47))
Education (Mentally Handicapped Children) (Scotland) Act 1974	1974 c. 27	17 July 1974
An Act to make provision as respects Scotland for discontinuing the ascertainment of mentally handicapped children as unsuitable for education at school, to impose a duty on education authorities to provide for the education of such children whether accommodated in a hospital within the meaning of the Mental Health (Scotland) Act 1960 (Note: Mental Health (Scotland) Act 1960 (8 & 9 Eliz. 2. c. 61)) or otherwise, and for purposes connected therewith.
Northern Ireland Act 1974 (repealed)	1974 c. 28	17 July 1974
An Act to provide for the dissolution of the existing Northern Ireland Assembly and its prorogation until dissolution; to make temporary provision for the government of Northern Ireland; to provide for the election and holding of a Constitutional Convention in Northern Ireland; and for purposes connected with those matters. (Repealed by Northern Ireland Act 1998 (c. 47))
Parks Regulation (Amendment) Act 1974	1974 c. 29	17 July 1974
An Act to amend further the Parks Regulation Act 1872. (Note: Parks Regulation Act 1872 (35 & 36 Vict. c. 15))
Finance Act 1974	1974 c. 30	31 July 1974
An Act to grant certain duties, to alter other duties, and to amend the law relating to the National Debt and the Public Revenue, and to make further provision in connection with Finance.
Appropriation (No. 2) Act 1974	1974 c. 31	31 July 1974
An Act to apply certain sums out of the Consolidated Fund to the service of the years ending on 31st March 1973 and 1975, to appropriate the supplies granted in this Session of Parliament, and to repeal certain Consolidated Fund and Appropriation Acts.
Town and Country Amenities Act 1974 (repealed)	1974 c. 32	31 July 1974
An Act to make further provision for the control of development in the interests of amenity, for the protection of trees and the preservation and enhancement of conservation areas, and of buildings of architectural or historic interest and their surroundings and landscapes, and for related purposes. (Repealed by Statute Law (Repeals) Act 2008)
Northern Ireland (Young Persons) Act 1974 (repealed)	1974 c. 33	31 July 1974
An Act to make temporary provision for the holding in custody of young persons charged with certain offences in Northern Ireland. (Repealed by Northern Ireland (Emergency Provisions) Act 1978 (c. 5))
Pakistan Act 1974	1974 c. 34	31 July 1974
An Act to amend the Pakistan Act 1973 so as to extend the voting rights of certain persons who, by virtue of that Act, ceased to be British subjects.
Carriage of Passengers by Road Act 1974 (repealed)	1974 c. 35	31 July 1974
An Act to give effect to a Convention on the Contract for the International Carriage of Passengers and Luggage by Road, and for purposes connected therewith. (Repealed by Statute Law (Repeals) Act 2004 (c. 14))
Mines (Working Facilities and Support) Act 1974	1974 c. 36	31 July 1974
An Act to amend the Mines (Working Facilities and Support) Act 1966.
Health and Safety at Work etc. Act 1974 or the Health and Safety Act 1974 or the Health and Safety at Work Act 1974	1974 c. 37	31 July 1974
An Act to make further provision for securing the health, safety and welfare of persons at work, for protecting others against risks to health or safety in connection with the activities of persons at work, for controlling the keeping and use and preventing the unlawful acquisition, possession and use of dangerous substances, and for controlling certain emissions into the atmosphere; to make further provision with respect to the employment medical advisory service; to amend the law relating to building regulations, and the Building (Scotland) Act 1959; (Note: Building (Scotland) Act 1959 (7 & 8 Eliz. 2. c. 24)) and for connected purposes.
Land Tenure Reform (Scotland) Act 1974	1974 c. 38	31 July 1974
An Act to provide, as respects Scotland, for the prohibition of new feuduties and other periodical payments from land; for the right to redeem feuduties and other such perpetual payments on a term day; for the redemption by law of feuduties and other such payments on transfer of land; for limitations on the residential use of property subject to long lease and other rights of occupancy; for the variation of heritable securities in the event of residential use of the security subjects; for restrictions on certain rights of reversion, redemption and pre-emption; for limitation of the right to raise an action of irritancy for non-payment of feuduty; for abolition of the right to create leasehold casualties; for the recognition of interposed leases; for amendment of the law relating to registration of leases; for abolition of the registration and recording of documents in the Office of Chancery; and for related matters.
Consumer Credit Act 1974	1974 c. 39	31 July 1974
An Act to establish for the protection of consumers a new system, administered by the Director General of Fair Trading, of licensing and other control of traders concerned with the provision of credit, or the supply of goods on hire or hire-purchase, and their transactions, in place of the present enactments regulating moneylenders, pawnbrokers and hire-purchase traders and their transactions; and for related matters.
Control of Pollution Act 1974	1974 c. 40	31 July 1974
An Act to make further provision with respect to waste disposal, water pollution, noise, atmospheric pollution and public health; and for purposes connected with the matters aforesaid.
Policing of Airports Act 1974 (repealed)	1974 c. 41	31 July 1974
An Act to make provision for enabling the policing of any airport designated for that purpose to be undertaken by the police force for the area in which it is wholly or mainly situated; and for connected purposes. (Repealed by Aviation Security Act 1982 (c. 36))
Independent Broadcasting Authority (No. 2) Act 1974 (repealed)	1974 c. 42	31 July 1974
An Act to extend from 31st July 1976 to 31st July 1979 the date until which the Independent Broadcasting Authority are to provide television and local sound broadcasting services. (Repealed by Broadcasting Act 1980 (c. 64))
Merchant Shipping Act 1974	1974 c. 43	31 July 1974
An Act to make further provision concerning oil pollution by ships and related matters; to give power to protect shipping and trading interests against foreign action concerning or affecting carriage of goods by sea; to make provision relating to the operation of submersible apparatus; to alter the constitution of the Commissioners of Northern Lighthouses; and to amend certain provisions of the Merchant Shipping Act 1970 (Note: Merchant Shipping Act 1970 (c. 36)) relating to offences committed by seamen.
Housing Act 1974	1974 c. 44	31 July 1974
An Act to extend the functions of the Housing Corporation and provide for the registration of, and the giving of financial assistance to, certain housing associations; to make further provision in relation to clearance areas and other areas in which living conditions are unsatisfactory or otherwise in need of improvement; to provide for the making of grants towards the improvement, repair and provision of housing accommodation and for the compulsory improvement of such accommodation; to amend the law relating to assistance for house purchase and improvement and expenditure in connection with the provision and improvement of housing accommodation and of hostels; to raise the rateable value limits under the Leasehold Reform Act 1967; (Note: Leasehold Reform Act 1967 (c. 88)) to amend the Housing Finance Act 1972; (Note: Housing Finance Act 1972 (c. 47)) to amend the law relating to the rights and obligations of landlords and tenants and the enforceability of certain covenants relating to the development of land; and for purposes connected therewith.
Housing (Scotland) Act 1974 (repealed)	1974 c. 45	31 July 1974
An Act to provide for the making of grants towards the improvement, repair and provision by conversion of housing accommodation, to make provision for housing action areas and to re-enact with amendments certain provisions of Part I of the Housing (Scotland) Act 1969, (Note: Housing (Scotland) Act 1969 (c. 34)) to make provision as respects landlords and tenants in housing action areas, to extend the power of local authorities to make advances for the purpose of increasing housing accommodation, to empower the Secretary of State to make payment of a subsidy in order to compensate local authorities for the loss of rents as a result of the exercise of the power conferred by section 11 of the Counter-Inflation Act 1973, (Note: Counter-Inflation Act 1973 (c. 9)) to amend the provisions of Part V of the Housing (Scotland) Act 1969 relating to the improvement of amenities of residential areas, and for purposes connected therewith. (Repealed by Housing (Scotland) Act 1987 (c. 26))
Friendly Societies Act 1974	1974 c. 46	31 July 1974
An Act to consolidate the Friendly Societies Acts 1896 to 1971 and certain other enactments relating to the societies to which those Acts apply with amendments to give effect to recommendations of the Law Commission and the Scottish Law Commission.
Solicitors Act 1974	1974 c. 47	31 July 1974
An Act to consolidate the Solicitors Acts 1957 to 1974 and certain other enactments relating to solicitors.
Railways Act 1974	1974 c. 48	31 July 1974
An Act to amend the law relating to the British Railways Board; to make provision for the performance by the Secretary of State of functions in relation to the Board under certain regulations of the Council of the European Communities relating to transport; to make provision with respect to certain pension schemes; to make provision for grants in connection with freight haulage facilities; to make provision with respect to the chairmen of Transport Consultative Committees; and for connected purposes.
Insurance Companies Act 1974 (repealed)	1974 c. 49	31 July 1974
An Act to consolidate, with certain exceptions, the provisions of the Insurance Companies Acts 1958 to 1973. (Repealed by Statute Law (Repeals) Act 1993 (c. 50))
Road Traffic Act 1974	1974 c. 50	31 July 1974
An Act to make further provision with respect to road traffic and operators' licences, and for connected purposes.
Rent Act 1974	1974 c. 51	31 July 1974
An Act to amend the Rent Act 1968 (Note: Rent Act 1968 (c. 23)) and the Rent (Scotland) Act 1971 (Note: Rent (Scotland) Act 1971 (c. 28)) and the provisions of Part II of the Housing Finance Act 1972 and of the Housing (Financial Provisions) (Scotland) Act 1972 (Note: Housing (Financial Provisions) (Scotland) Act 1972 (c. 46)) relating to rent allowances, and for connected purposes. (Repealed for Scotland by Rent (Scotland) Act 1984 (c. 58))
Trade Union and Labour Relations Act 1974 (repealed)	1974 c. 52	31 July 1974
An Act to repeal the Industrial Relations Act 1971; (Note: Industrial Relations Act 1971 (c. 72)) to make provision with respect to the law relating to trade unions, employers' associations, workers and employers, including the law relating to unfair dismissal, and with respect to the jurisdiction and procedure of industrial tribunals; and for connected purposes. (Repealed by Trade Union and Labour Relations (Consolidation) Act 1992 (c. 52))
Rehabilitation of Offenders Act 1974	1974 c. 53	31 July 1974
An Act to rehabilitate offenders who have not been reconvicted of any serious offence for periods of years, to penalise the unauthorised disclosure of their previous convictions, to amend the law of defamation, and for purposes connected therewith.
Pensioners' Payments Act 1974	1974 c. 54	14 November 1974
An Act to make provision for lump sum payments to pensioners and for purposes connected therewith.
National Theatre Act 1974 (repealed)	1974 c. 55	29 November 1974
An Act to remove the limits imposed by the National Theatre Act 1949 (Note: National Theatre Act 1949 (12, 13 & 14 Geo. 6. c. 16)) on the contributions which may be made under that Act towards the cost of erecting and equipping a national theatre. (Repealed by Statute Law (Repeals) Act 2013 (c. 2))
Prevention of Terrorism (Temporary Provisions) Act 1974	1974 c. 56	29 November 1974
An Act to proscribe organisations concerned in terrorism, and to give power to exclude certain persons from Great Britain or the United Kingdom in order to prevent acts of terrorism, and for connected purposes.
Consolidated Fund (No. 4) Act 1974	1974 c. 57	12 December 1974
An Act to apply a sum out of the Consolidated Fund to the service of the year ending on 31st March 1975.
Social Security Amendment Act 1974 (repealed)	1974 c. 58	12 December 1974
An Act to amend the provisions of the Social Security Act 1973 as to the rate or amount of contributions; to alter the meaning of "year" in certain provisions of that Act; to extend the power to enable friendly societies to conduct business with a view to establishing occupational pension schemes; to amend section 58 of the National Insurance Act 1965, (Note: National Insurance Act 1965 (c. 51)) sections 29(c), 40(1) and 49 of the said Act of 1973 and certain enactments corresponding to the said sections 58 and 40(1); to amend certain enactments in connection with the consolidation of social security legislation; and for purposes connected with the matters aforesaid. (Repealed by Social Security (Consequential Provisions) Act 1975 (c. 18))

== Local acts ==
Short title	Citation	Royal assent
Long title
Harwich Harbour Act 1974	1974 c. i	8 February 1974
An Act to consolidate with amendments statutory provisions relating to the Harwich Harbour Conservancy Board; to confer new powers on the Board; and for other purposes.
Ayr County Council Order Confirmation Act 1974 (repealed)	1974 c. ii	10 April 1974
An Act to confirm a Provisional Order under the Private Legislation Procedure (Scotland) Act 1936, (Note: Private Legislation Procedure (Scotland) Act 1936 (26 Geo. 5 & 1 Edw. 8. c. 52)) relating to Ayr County Council. (Repealed by Statute Law (Repeals) Act 1995 (c. 44))
	Ayr County Council Order 1974 Provisional Order to confer on the Ayr County Council further powers with respect to the local government and finances of the county; and for other purposes.	
St. Andrews Links Order Confirmation Act 1974	1974 c. iii	10 April 1974
An Act to confirm a Provisional Order under the Private Legislation Procedure (Scotland) Act 1936, relating to St. Andrews Links.
	St. Andrews Links Order 1974 Provisional Order to constitute the St. Andrews Links Trust and to vest in the said Trust the control and management of the Links of St. Andrews; and for purposes connected therewith.	
Renfrew County Council Order Confirmation Act 1974 (repealed)	1974 c. iv	10 April 1974
An Act to confirm a Provisional Order under the Private Legislation Procedure (Scotland) Act 1936, relating to Renfrew County Council. (Repealed by Statute Law (Repeals) Act 1998 (c. 43))
	Renfrew County Council Order 1974 Provisional Order to confer further powers on the county council of the county of Renfrew in relation to the finances of the said county; and for other purposes.	
Glasgow Corporation (Miscellaneous Provisions) Order Confirmation Act 1974	1974 c. v	10 April 1974
An Act to confirm a Provisional Order under the Private Legislation Procedure (Scotland) Act 1936, relating to Glasgow Corporation (Miscellaneous Provisions).
	Glasgow Corporation (Miscellaneous Provisions) Order 1974 Provisional Order to make provision for the registration of premises used for certain purposes; to confer powers on the Corporation of the city of Glasgow with respect to the maintenance of watercourses, private streets and footpaths and the parking of heavy vehicles; and for other purposes.	
Glasgow Corporation (Control of Parking &c.) Order Confirmation Act 1974	1974 c. vi	10 April 1974
An Act to confirm a Provisional Order under the Private Legislation Procedure (Scotland) Act 1936, relating to Glasgow Corporation (Control of Parking &c.).
	Glasgow Corporation (Control of Parking &c.) Order 1974 Provisional Order to enable the Corporation of the city of Glasgow to control the establishment and operation of off-street parking places within the city; to enact further powers as to libraries; and for other purposes.	
Greenock Corporation Order Confirmation Act 1974 (repealed)	1974 c. vii	10 April 1974
An Act to confirm a Provisional Order under the Private Legislation Procedure (Scotland) Act 1936, relating to Greenock Corporation. (Repealed by Statute Law (Repeals) Act 1998 (c. 43))
	Greenock Corporation Order 1974 Provisional Order to confer powers on the Corporation of Greenock with respect to the registration of entertainment clubs; and for other purposes.	
Zetland County Council Act 1974	1974 c. viii	10 April 1974
An Act to impose upon the county council of Zetland duties of conservancy and development, and harbour duties; to enable the Council to exercise harbour jurisdiction and powers, including powers to construct works and to acquire lands; and for other purposes.
Barclays Bank International Act 1974 (repealed)	1974 c. ix	23 May 1974
An Act to provide for the manner in which Barclays Bank International Limited may alter, revoke or add to its objects; and for other purposes. (Repealed by Barclays Bank Act 1984 (c. x))
United Kingdom Temperance and General Provident Institution Act 1974	1974 c. x	23 May 1974
An Act to confer further powers upon United Kingdom Temperance and General Provident Institution; to make further provision for the regulation and management of the Institution; and for other purposes.
Clerical, Medical and General Life Assurance Act 1974 (repealed)	1974 c. xi	9 July 1974
An Act to provide for the incorporation of the Clerical, Medical and General Life Assurance Society; and for other purposes. (Repealed by HBOS Group Reorganisation Act 2006 (c. i))
Crude Oil Terminals (Humber) Act 1974	1974 c. xii	9 July 1974
An Act to extend the time for completion of certain works by Crude Oil Terminals (Humber) Limited; and for other purposes.
Morpeth Common Act 1974	1974 c. xiii	9 July 1974
An Act to provide for the preservation and for restricting the user of certain land in the borough of Castle Morpeth in the county of Northumberland known as Morpeth Common; and for other purposes.
University of Bristol Act 1974	1974 c. xiv	9 July 1974
An Act to amend the University of Bristol Act 1960; (Note: University of Bristol Act 1960 (8 & 9 Eliz. 2. c. xxvi)) and for other purposes.
Fife County Council Order Confirmation Act 1974 (repealed)	1974 c. xv	17 July 1974
An Act to confirm a Provisional Order under the Private Legislation Procedure (Scotland) Act 1936, relating to Fife County Council. (Repealed by Statute Law (Repeals) Act 1995 (c. 44))
	Fife County Council Order 1974 Provisional Order to confer on the County Council of the county of Fife powers with respect to the licensing and regulation of taxicabs and private hire cabs; and for other purposes.	
Spanish and Portuguese Jews' (Golders Green) Burial Ground Act 1974	1974 c. xvi	17 July 1974
An Act to authorise the use for other purposes of a portion of the burial ground of the Spanish and Portuguese Jews' Congregation of London situate at Golders Green in the London borough of Barnet; and for purposes incidental thereto.
London Transport Act 1974	1974 c. xvii	17 July 1974
An Act to empower the London Transport Executive to construct works and to acquire lands; to extend the time for the compulsory purchase of certain lands and the completion of certain works; to confer further powers on the Executive; and for other purposes.
British Airports Authority (Longford River) Act 1974	1974 c. xviii	17 July 1974
An Act to authorise the disposition by the Secretary of State for the Environment to the British Airports Authority of certain sections of the Longford River; and for other purposes.
Old London Road, Hythe, Burial Ground Act 1974	1974 c. xix	17 July 1974
An Act to authorise the use of part of the site of the former burial ground adjoining Old London Road, Hythe, in the district of Shepway for building or otherwise; and for purposes incidental thereto.
Lerwick Harbour Order Confirmation Act 1974	1974 c. xx	31 July 1974
An Act to confirm a Provisional Order under the Private Legislation Procedure (Scotland) Act 1936, relating to Lerwick Harbour.
	Lerwick Harbour Order 1974 Provisional Order to authorise the Trustees of the Port and Harbour of Lerwick to construct a new work in connection with the improvement of the harbour; to extend the limits of the harbour; to confer powers on the Trustees with respect to the management, regulation and control of development within the harbour; to establish a terminal for helicopters; to borrow money; and for other purposes.	
Ashdown Forest Act 1974	1974 c. xxi	31 July 1974
An Act to alter the constitution of, and to incorporate, the Conservators of Ashdown Forest; to alter the arrangements for meeting the expenses of the Conservators; to amend or repeal enactments relating to the Conservators and the forest and to confer further powers upon the Conservators; and for other purposes.
British Transport Docks Act 1974	1974 c. xxii	31 July 1974
An Act to empower the British Transport Docks Board to construct works and to acquire lands; to extend the time for the compulsory purchase of certain lands; to confer further powers on the Board; and for other purposes.
British Waterways Act 1974	1974 c. xxiii	31 July 1974
An Act to empower the British Waterways Board to construct works and to acquire lands; to confer further powers on the Board; and for other purposes.
Greater London Council (General Powers) Act 1974	1974 c. xxiv	31 July 1974
An Act to confer further powers upon the Greater London Council and other authorities; and for other purposes.
Thurrock Borough Council Act 1974 (repealed)	1974 c. xxv	31 July 1974
An Act to confer powers on the Thurrock Borough Council for the control of the brown tail moth; and for other purposes. (Repealed by Essex Act 1987 (c. xx))
Weymouth and Portland Water Sports Act 1974	1974 c. xxvi	31 July 1974
An Act to empower the Weymouth and Portland Borough Council to provide facilities for water sports; and for other purposes.
Wrightson NMA Limited Act 1974	1974 c. xxvii	31 July 1974
An Act to make provision for the transfer to New Zealand of the registered office of Wrightson NMA Limited; for the cesser of application to that company of provisions of the Companies Acts 1948 to 1967; and for other purposes incidental thereto.
Workington Harbour Act 1974	1974 c. xxviii	31 July 1974
An Act to transfer to the Cumbria County Council the undertaking of the Workington Harbour and Dock Company Limited; to empower the County Council to manage Workington Harbour; and for other purposes.
Greater London Council (Money) Act 1974	1974 c. xxix	31 July 1974
An Act to regulate the expenditure on capital account and on lending to other persons by the Greater London Council during the financial period from 1st April 1974 to 30th September 1975; and for other purposes.
Orkney County Council Act 1974	1974 c. xxx	31 July 1974
An Act to authorise the county council of the county of Orkney to exercise harbour jurisdiction and powers in respect of development, including powers to license the construction of works and dredging, in certain areas of and adjacent to the county, and in connection therewith to acquire lands compulsorily; and for other purposes.
The Green, Aberdeen (Boots The Chemists Limited) Order Confirmation Act 1974	1974 c. xxxi	12 December 1974
An Act to confirm a Provisional Order under the Private Legislation Procedure (Scotland) Act 1936, relating to The Green, Aberdeen (Boots The Chemists Limited).
	The Green, Aberdeen (Boots The Chemists Limited) Order 1974 Provisional Order to authorise Boots The Chemists Limited to construct buildings or structures bridging over The Green and Rennie's Wynd in the city and royal burgh of Aberdeen; and for other purposes.	
Torquay Market Act 1974	1974 c. xxxii	12 December 1974
An Act to confer powers on the Torquay Market Company in relation to the capital and management of their undertaking; to confer further powers on the Company; and for other purposes.
Dumbarton Burgh Order Confirmation Act 1974	1974 c. xxxiii	19 December 1974
An Act to confirm a Provisional Order under the Private Legislation Procedure (Scotland) Act 1936, relating to Dumbarton Burgh.
	Dumbarton Burgh Order 1974 Provisional Order to transfer to and vest in the provost magistrates and councillors of the royal burgh of Dumbarton the undertaking of the Dumbarton Harbour Board and to confer upon the said provost magistrates and councillors all necessary powers with respect to the said undertaking; and for other purposes.	
Scottish Transport Group (Oban Quay) Order Confirmation Act 1974	1974 c. xxxiv	19 December 1974
An Act to confirm a Provisional Order under the Private Legislation Procedure (Scotland) Act 1936, relating to Scottish Transport Group (Oban Quay).
	Scottish Transport Group (Oban Quay) Order 1974 Provisional Order to authorise certain works carried out by the Scottish Transport Group at their quay at Oban, to empower the Group to carry out further works and to confer further powers on the Group; and for other purposes.	
Crouch Harbour Act 1974	1974 c. xxxv	19 December 1974
An Act to establish the Crouch Harbour Authority for the administration and control of the harbour formed by the rivers Crouch and Roach and adjacent waters in the county of Essex; to confer on the Authority powers necessary or expedient for the preservation, protection, regulation, management, maintenance and improvement of the said harbour and the navigation thereof; to enact provisions in connection with the matters aforesaid; and for other purposes.
Port of Tyne (North Shields Fish Harbour) Act 1974	1974 c. xxxvi	19 December 1974
An Act to authorise the Port of Tyne Authority to acquire land and to construct works; and for other purposes.
River Wear Barrage Act 1974	1974 c. xxxvii	19 December 1974
An Act to empower the Washington Development Corporation to construct a barrage with movable gates and a footbridge across the river Wear in the county of Tyne and Wear and in connection therewith to execute other works and to acquire lands; and for other purposes.

== See also ==
- List of acts of the Parliament of the United Kingdom
