= Parliamentary Under-Secretary of State for Gambling =

United Kingdom Parliamentary Under-Secretary of State for Museums, Heritage and Gambling
- Royal Arms of His Majesty's Government

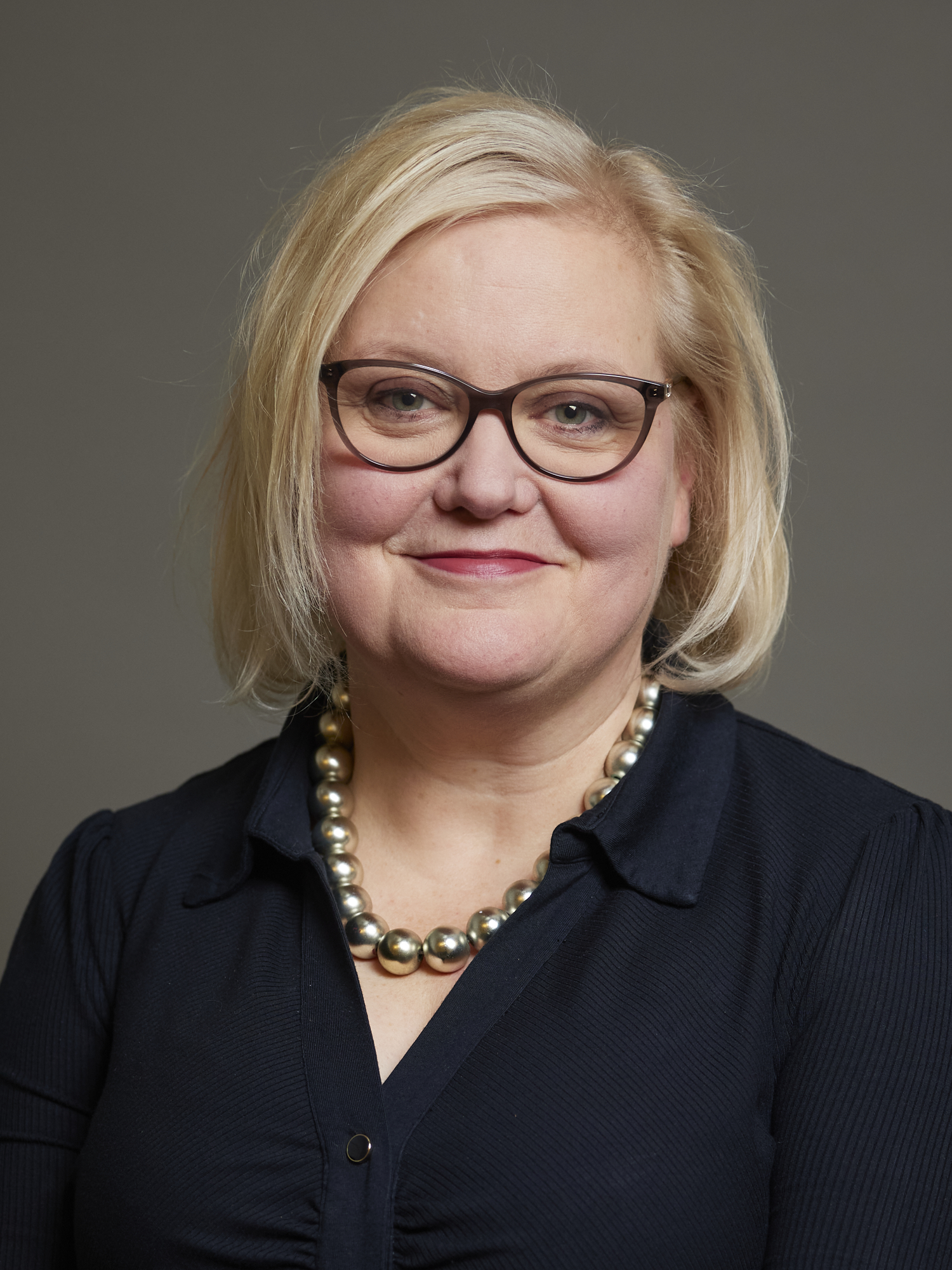
- Incumbent; Fiona Twycross, Baroness Twycross since 9 July 2024
- Department for Culture, Media and Sport
- Member of: His Majesty's Government
- Seat: Westminster
- Nominator: Prime Minister
- Appointer: The Monarch (on the advice of the Prime Minister)
- Term length: At His Majesty's pleasure

The Parliamentary Under-Secretary of State for Museums, Heritage and Gambling is a role in the Department for Culture, Media and Sport of His Majesty's Government. It has been held by Fiona Twycross, Baroness Twycross since July 2024.

== Responsibilities ==
Responsibilities include:

- Museums and cultural property
- Heritage
- Gambling
- Libraries
- The National Archives
- Corporate Minister and Legislation
- DCMS business in the House of Lords

== List of ministers ==
Name	Portrait	Took office	Left office	Political party	Prime Minister
Parliamentary Under-Secretary of State for Gambling
Fiona Twycross, Baroness Twycross		9 July 2024	Incumbent	Labour	Keir Starmer
