= Local Government Act 1974 (United Kingdom) =

Act of the Parliament of the United Kingdom

Local Government Act 1974 (Note: Section 43(1).)
- Act of Parliament
- Parliament of the United Kingdom
- Long title: An Act to make further provision, in relation to England and Wales, with respect to the payment of grants to local authorities, rating and valuation, borrowing and lending by local authorities and the classification of highways; to extend the powers of the Countryside Commission to give financial assistance; to provide for the establishment of Commissions for the investigation of administrative action taken by or on behalf of local and other authorities; to restrict certain grants under the Transport Act 1968; to provide for the removal or relaxation of certain statutory controls affecting local government activities; to make provision in relation to the collection of sums by local authorities on behalf of water authorities; to amend section 259(3) of the Local Government Act 1972 and to make certain minor amendments of or consequential on that Act; and for connected purposes.
- Citation: 1974 c. 7
- Territorial extent: England and Wales

Dates
- Royal assent: 8 February 1974 (Note: Section 43(6).)
- Commencement: various (Note: Section 43(2)–(3).)

Other legislation
- Amends: Civic Restaurants Act 1947; Prevention of Damage by Pests Act 1949; Plant Health Act 1967; Late Night Refreshment Houses Act 1969; Slaughterhouses Act 1974
- Amended by: House of Commons Disqualification Act 1975; Northern Ireland Assembly Disqualification Act 1975; Land Drainage Act 1976; Supplementary Benefits Act 1976; National Health Service Act 1977; Highways Act 1980; Animal Health Act 1981; British Telecommunications Act 1981; Road Traffic Regulation Act 1984; Food Act 1984; Housing (Consequential Provisions) Act 1985; Weights and Measures Act 1985; Coal Industry Act 1987; Official Secrets Act 1989; Statute Law (Repeals) Act 1989; Planning (Consequential Provisions) Act 1990; Health Service Commissioners Act 1993; Countryside and Rights of Way Act 2000; Statute Law (Repeals) Act 2004; Government of Wales Act 2006; Policing and Crime Act 2017; Renters' Rights Act 2025

Status: Amended

Text of statute as originally enacted

Revised text of statute as amended

Text of the Local Government Act 1974 (United Kingdom) as in force today (including any amendments) within the United Kingdom, from legislation.gov.uk.

The Local Government Act 1974 (c. 7) is an act of the Parliament of the United Kingdom that followed the Local Government Act 1972, introducing further minor changes to the system of local government in England and Wales. It also introduced the Local Government and Social Care Ombudsman.
