= House of Commons Disqualification Act 1975 =

Act of the Parliament of the United Kingdom

House of Commons Disqualification Act 1975 (Note: Section 11(1).)
- Act of Parliament
- Parliament of the United Kingdom
- Long title: An Act to consolidate certain enactments relating to disqualification for membership of the House of Commons.
- Citation: 1975 c. 24
- Territorial extent: England and Wales; Scotland; Northern Ireland; (Note: Section 11(2).)

Dates
- Royal assent: 8 May 1975
- Commencement: 8 May 1975 (Note: The Acts of Parliament (Commencement) Act 1793.)
Other legislation
Amends	House of Commons Disqualification Act 1957; Deer (Scotland) Act 1959; Administration of Justice Act 1964; Law Commissions Act 1965; Iron and Steel Act 1967; Solicitors Act 1974
Amended by	List: Employment Protection Act 1975; Recess Elections Act 1975; Statute Law (Repeals) Act 1976; Race Relations Act 1976; Statute Law (Repeals) Act 1977; Judicature (Northern Ireland) Act 1978; Statute Law (Repeals) Act 1978; Representation of the People Act 1981; Representation of the People Act 1983; Energy Act 1983; Reserve Forces (Safeguard of Employment) Act 1985; Interception of Communications Act 1985; Airports Act 1986; Parliamentary Constituencies Act 1986; Coal Industry Act 1987; Pilotage Act 1987; Water Act 1989; Human Fertilisation and Embryology Act 1990; Law Reform (Miscellaneous Provisions) (Scotland) Act 1990; Broadcasting Act 1990; National Health Service and Community Care Act 1990; Child Support Act 1991; Natural Heritage (Scotland) Act 1991; Health and Personal Social Services(Northern Ireland Consequential Amendments) Order 1991; Social Security (Consequential Provisions) Act 1992; Social Security (Consequential Provisions) (Northern Ireland) Act 1992; Further and Higher Education Act 1992; Trade Union and Labour Relations (Consolidation) Act 1992; Sea Fish (Conservation) Act 1992; Trade Union Reform and Employment Rights Act 1993; Welsh Language Act 1993; House of Commons Disqualification Order 1993; Coal Industry Act 1994; Local Government etc. (Scotland) Act 1994; Trade Marks Act 1994; Intelligence Services Act 1994; Criminal Appeal Act 1995; Environment Act 1995; Crown Agents Act 1995; Health Authorities Act 1995; Atomic Energy Authority Act 1995; Police Act 1996; Reserve Forces Act 1996; Planning (Consequential Provisions) (Scotland) Act 1997; Crime and Punishment (Scotland) Act 1997; House of Commons Disqualification Order 1997; Northern Ireland Act 1998; National Minimum Wage Act 1998; Crime and Disorder Act 1998; School Standards and Framework Act 1998; Government of Wales Act 1998; Health and Medicines Act 1988; Scotland Act 1998; Bank of England Act 1998; Social Security Act 1998; Police (Northern Ireland) Act 1998; Employment Rights (Dispute Resolution) Act 1998; Northern Ireland (Sentences) Act 1998; Health and Safety at Work (Amendment) (Northern Ireland) Order 1998; Commonwealth Development Corporation Act 1999; Employment Relations Act 1999; Access to Justice Act 1999; Immigration and Asylum Act 1999; Food Standards Act 1999; Postal Services Act 2000; Police (Northern Ireland) Act 2000; Disqualifications Act 2000; Regulation of Investigatory Powers Act 2000; Freedom of Information Act 2000; Countryside and Rights of Way Act 2000; Care Standards Act 2000; Transport Act 2000; Criminal Justice and Court Services Act 2000; Political Parties, Elections and Referendums Act 2000; Utilities Act 2000; House of Commons (Removal of Clergy Disqualification) Act 2001; Health and Social Care Act 2001; Armed Forces Act 2001; Private Security Industry Act 2001; Enterprise Act 2002; Education Act 2002; Justice (Northern Ireland) Act 2002; Office of Communications Act 2002; Land Registration Act 2002; Ministry of Agriculture, Fisheries and Food (Dissolution) Order 2002; Water Act 2003; Communications Act 2003; Health and Social Care (Community Health and Standards) Act 2003; Energy Act 2004; Pensions Act 2004; Human Tissue Act 2004; Children Act 2004; Gender Recognition Act 2004; Companies (Audit, Investigations and Community Enterprise) Act 2004; Water Industry (Scotland) Act 2002 (Consequential Modifications) Order 2004; Scottish Public Services Ombudsman Act 2002 (Consequential Provisions and Modifications) Order 2004; Railways Act 2005; Serious Organised Crime and Police Act 2005; Constitutional Reform Act 2005; Clean Neighbourhoods and Environment Act 2005; Gambling Act 2005; Public Services Ombudsman (Wales) Act 2005; Water Services etc. (Scotland) Act 2005 (Consequential Provisions and Modifications) Order 2005; Wales Tourist Board (Transfer of Functions to the National Assembly for Wales and Abolition) Order 2005; National Lottery Act 2006; Armed Forces Act 2006; Charities Act 2006; Commissioner for Older People (Wales) Act 2006; Equality Act 2006; Natural Environment and Rural Communities Act 2006; National Health Service (Consequential Provisions) Act 2006; Charities and Trustee Investment (Scotland) Act 2005 (Consequential Provisions and Modifications) Order 2006; Management of Offenders etc. (Scotland) Act 2005 (Consequential Modifications) Order 2006; Legal Services Act 2007; Statistics and Registration Service Act 2007; Local Government and Public Involvement in Health Act 2007; References to Health Authorities Order 2007; Tourist Boards (Scotland) Act 2006 (Consequential Modifications) Order 2007; Child Maintenance and Other Payments Act 2008; Climate Change Act 2008; Pensions Act 2008; Housing and Regeneration Act 2008; Transfer of Tribunal Functions Order 2008; Agriculture and Horticulture Development Board Order 2008; Criminal Justice (Northern Ireland Consequential Amendments) Order 2008; Legislative Reform (Health and Safety Executive) Order 2008; Housing (Scotland) Act 2006 (Consequential Provisions) Order 2008; Parliamentary Standards Act 2009; Local Democracy, Economic Development and Construction Act 2009; Marine and Coastal Access Act 2009; Coroners and Justice Act 2009; Transfer of Tribunal Functions and Revenue and Customs Appeals Order 2009; Companies Act 2006 (Consequential Amendments, Transitional Provisions and Savings) Order 2009; Constitutional Reform and Governance Act 2010; Northern Ireland Court Service (Abolition and Transfer of Functions) Order (Northern Ireland) 2010; House of Commons Disqualification Order 2010; Transfer of Tribunal Functions Order 2010; Postal Services Act 2011; Charities Act 2011; Police Reform and Social Responsibility Act 2011; Budget Responsibility and National Audit Act 2011; Parliamentary Voting System and Constituencies Act 2011; Public Bodies Act 2011; Sovereign Grant Act 2011; Localism Act 2011; Planning Act (Northern Ireland) 2011; Sports Grounds Safety Authority Act 2011; Education Act 2011; Public Services Reform (Scotland) Act 2010 (Consequential Modifications of Enactments) Order 2011; Financial Services Act 2012; Health and Social Care Act 2012; Welfare Reform Act 2012; Protection of Freedoms Act 2012; Human Medicines Regulations 2012; Inland Waterways Advisory Council (Abolition) Order 2012; Housing (Scotland) Act 2010 (Consequential Provisions and Modifications) Order 2012; Legal Aid, Sentencing and Punishment of Offenders Act 2012; Advisory Committee on Hazardous Substances (Abolition) Order 2012; Local Better Regulation Office (Dissolution and Transfer of Functions, Etc.) Order 2012; Public Bodies (Abolition of the Commission for Rural Communities) Order 2012; Public Bodies (Abolition of the National Endowment for Science, Technology and the Arts) Order 2012; Public Bodies (Child Maintenance and Enforcement Commission: Abolition and Transfer of Functions) Order 2012; Statute Law (Repeals) Act 2013; Energy Act 2013; Groceries Code Adjudicator Act 2013; Crime and Courts Act 2013; Enterprise and Regulatory Reform Act 2013; Natural Resources Body for Wales (Functions) Order 2013; Children's Hearings (Scotland) Act 2011 (Consequential and Transitional Provisions and Savings) Order 2013; Police and Fire Reform (Scotland) Act 2012 (Consequential Provisions and Modifications) Order 2013; Public Bodies (Abolition of Administrative Justice and Tribunals Council) Order 2013; Public Bodies (Abolition of British Shipbuilders) Order 2013; Public Bodies (Abolition of BRB (Residuary) Limited) Order 2013; Public Bodies (Abolition of the Registrar of Public Lending Right) Order 2013; Public Bodies (Abolition of the Disability Living Allowance Advisory Board) Order 2013; Public Bodies (Abolition of the Aircraft and Shipbuilding Industries Arbitration Tribunal) Order 2013; Public Bodies (Merger of the Gambling Commission and the National Lottery Commission) Order 2013; Transfer of Tribunal Functions Order 2013; Competition Act 1998 (Consequential Provisions) Order 2013; Defence Reform Act 2014; Care Act 2014; Northern Ireland (Miscellaneous Provisions) Act 2014; Wales Act 2014; Water Act 2014; Olympic Delivery Authority (Dissolution) Order 2014; Enterprise and Regulatory Reform Act 2013 (Competition) (Consequential, Transitional and Saving Provisions) Order 2014; Revenue Scotland and Tax Powers Act 2014 (Consequential Provisions and Modifications) Order 2014; Public Bodies (Abolition of Food from Britain) Order 2014; Public Bodies (Abolition of the National Consumer Council and Transfer of the Office of Fair Trading's Functions in relation to Estate Agents etc) Order 2014; Small Business, Enterprise and Employment Act 2015; Armed Forces (Service Complaints and Financial Assistance) Act 2015; Courts Reform (Scotland) Act 2014 (Consequential Provisions and Modifications) Order 2015; Office of Rail Regulation (Change of Name) Regulations 2015; Immigration Act 2016; Bank of England and Financial Services Act 2016; Enterprise Act 2016; Policing and Crime Act 2017; Higher Education and Research Act 2017; Children and Social Work Act 2017; National Citizen Service Act 2017; Scottish Fiscal Commission Act 2016 (Consequential Provisions and Modifications) Order 2017; Crown Estate Scotland Order 2017; Health and Social Care (National Data Guardian) Act 2018; Legislative Reform (Regulator of Social Housing) (England) Order 2018; Tax Collection and Management (Wales) Act 2016 and the Land Transaction Tax and Anti-avoidance of Devolved Taxes (Wales) Act 2017 (Consequential Amendments) Order 2018; First-tier Tribunal for Scotland (Transfer of Functions of the Additional Support Needs Tribunals for Scotland) Regulations 2018; Forestry and Land Management (Scotland) Act 2018 (Consequential Provisions and Modifications) Order 2019; Financial Guidance and Claims Act 2018 (Naming and Consequential Amendments) Regulations 2019; Scottish Elections (Reform) Act 2020; European Union (Withdrawal Agreement) Act 2020; Public Bodies (Abolition of Public Works Loan Commissioners) Order 2020; Environment Act 2021; Trade Act 2021; Ministerial and other Maternity Allowances Act 2021; Domestic Abuse Act 2021; Medicines and Medical Devices Act 2021; Forensic Science Regulator Act 2021; Armed Forces Act 2021; UK Withdrawal from the European Union (Continuity) (Scotland) Act 2021 (Consequential Provisions and Modifications) Order 2021; Elections Act 2022; Advanced Research and Invention Agency Act 2022; Health and Care Act 2022; Consumer Scotland Act 2020 (Consequential Provisions and Modifications) Order 2022; Health and Social Care Act (Northern Ireland) 2022 (Consequential Amendments) Order 2022; Finance (No. 2) Act 2023; Health and Social Care Information Centre (Transfer of Functions, Abolition and Transitional Provisions) Regulations 2023; Health Education England (Transfer of Functions, Abolition and Transitional Provisions) Regulations 2023; Victims and Prisoners Act 2024; Senedd Cymru (Members and Elections) Act 2024; Energy Act 2023 (Consequential Amendments) Regulations 2024; Tertiary Education and Research (Wales) Act 2022 (Consequential Amendments) Order 2024; Football Governance Act 2025; Armed Forces Commissioner Act 2025; Employment Rights Act 2025; Scottish Elections (Representation and Reform) Act 2025; Scottish Parliament (Disqualification of Members of the House of Commons) Regulations 2025; Education (Scotland) Act 2025 (Consequential Provisions and Modifications) Order 2025; Building Safety Regulator (Establishment of New Body and Transfer of Functions etc.) Regulations 2026; English Devolution and Community Empowerment Act 2026
Relates to	Northern Ireland Assembly Disqualification Act 1975; Ministers of the Crown Act 1975; Ministerial and Other Salaries Act 1975; Electoral Administration Act 2006

Status: Amended

Text of statute as originally enacted

Revised text of statute as amended

Text of the House of Commons Disqualification Act 1975 as in force today (including any amendments) within the United Kingdom, from legislation.gov.uk.

The House of Commons Disqualification Act 1975 (c. 24) is an act of Parliament of the United Kingdom that prohibits certain categories of people from becoming members of the House of Commons. It is an updated version of similar older acts, known collectively by the stock short title House of Commons Disqualification Act.

== Provisions ==
=== Disqualification ===
The groups disqualified from membership of the House of Commons for all constituencies are:

- Lords Spiritual
- judges
- civil servants
- serving regular members of the armed forces, except Admirals of the Fleet, Field Marshals and Marshals of the Royal Air Force
- full-time police constables
- members of legislatures of non-Commonwealth countries, other than Ireland
- holders of certain administrative and diplomatic offices
- all members of certain bodies, such as tribunals and government departments, plus some statutory corporations such as Channel 4

Lords-lieutenant and high sheriffs are also disqualified from seats for constituencies within their area.

The election to the Commons of a disqualified person is invalid, and the seat of an MP who becomes disqualified is vacated immediately (triggering a by-election).

The Privy Council has jurisdiction to determine whether a purported MP is disqualified; the issue may be tried in the High Court, Court of Session or High Court of Northern Ireland as appropriate for the constituency.

Section 4 of the act adds the offices of steward or bailiff of the Chiltern Hundreds and the Manor of Northstead, only for the purposes of the vacation of a seat in the House of Commons. These offices are sinecures, used in modern times to effect resignation from the House of Commons. Prior to 1926, this disqualification was due to them being "offices of profit under the Crown", but that disqualification was abolished in 1926 and by s. 1(4) of this act.

=== Limits ===
Section 2 of the act limits the number of government officials (specifically, holders of offices listed in schedule 2) in the House of Commons at any one time to 95. Any MP appointed above that limit is forbidden to vote until the number is reduced to 95.

The effect of this part of the act is that the maximum number of MPs who can be appointed to ministerial posts is 95 (whether paid or unpaid). There is no equivalent limit on the number of members of the House of Lords who can be appointed to ministerial posts.

=== Repealed enactments ===
Section 10(2) of the act repealed 87 enactments, listed in schedule 3 to the act.

Enactments repealed by section 10(2)
Citation	Short title	Extent of repeal
5 & 6 Eliz. 2. c. 20	House of Commons Disqualification Act 1957	The whole act, except section 2(3).
5 & 6 Eliz. 2. c. 48	Electricity Act 1957	In Schedule 4, in Part II, the entry relating to the House of Commons Disqualification Act 1957.
6 & 7 Eliz. 2. c. 16	Commonwealth Institute Act 1958	Section 7(2).
6 & 7 Eliz. 2. c. 66	Tribunals and Inquiries Act 1958	The whole act, so far as unrepealed.
6 & 7 Eliz. 2. c. 71	Agriculture Act 1958	Section 8(2). In section 11(2), the words "except subsection (2) of section eight thereof".
7 & 8 Eliz. 2. c. 40	Deer (Scotland) Act 1959	In section 37(2), the words from "except" to "Act 1957". In Schedule 1, paragraph 3.
7 & 8 Eliz. 2. c. 62	New Towns Act 1959	Section 2(11). In section 14, in subsection (2) the words from "except" to "Commons" and in subsection (3) the words "except the said provision". In Schedule 1, paragraph 1(10).
7 & 8 Eliz. 2. c. 69	Wages Councils Act 1959	Section 25. In section 27(3) the words "save as otherwise expressly provided".
7 & 8 Eliz. 2. c. 72	Mental Health Act 1959	Section 3(5). In sections 150 and 152 the words "subsection (5) of section three".
8 & 9 Eliz. 2. c. 18	Local Employment Act 1960	Section 11.
8 & 9 Eliz. 2. c. 58	Charities Act 1960	In section 49(2)(a) the words from "it amends" to "1957".
8 & 9 Eliz. 2. c. 61	Mental Health (Scotland) Act 1960	Section 2(6). In sections 114 and 116 the words "subsection (6) of section two".
9 & 10 Eliz. 2. c. 17	Betting Levy Act 1961	The whole act, so far as unrepealed.
9 & 10 Eliz. 2. c. 49	Covent Garden Market Act 1961	Section 47.
10 & 11 Eliz. 2. c. 46	Transport Act 1962	Section 85. In Part I of Schedule 11, the words "section eighty-five" and the words "and the House of Commons Disqualification Act 1957".
1963 c. 33	London Government Act 1963	Section 92. In section 94, in subsection (3), the words "and section 92" and the words from "and the repeals" to "Act 1957" and in subsection (4) the words from the beginning to "said repeals" and the words "other than this subsection".
1963 c. 38	Water Resources Act 1963	In section 137, in subsection (2), the words "and paragraph 4 of Schedule 6 thereto" and in subsection (3) the words "(except paragraph 4 of Schedule 6)". In Schedule 6, paragraph 4.
1963 c. 40	Commonwealth Development Act 1963	Section 1(4).
1964 c. 14	Plant Varieties and Seeds Act 1964	In Schedule 4, paragraph 4.
1964 c. 16	Industrial Training Act 1964	Section 15. In section 19(2) the words "except section 15".
1964 c. 25	War Damage Act 1964	Section 13(4).
1964 c. 40	Harbours Act 1964	In section 63(2) the words "except paragraph 7 of Schedule 1". In Schedule 1, paragraph 7.
1964 c. 42	Administration of Justice Act 1964	In section 41, in subsection (6), the words from "and so" to "Act 1957" and in subsection (7) the words from "except" to "Act 1957". In Schedule 3, in Part II, paragraph 23.
1964 c. 56	Housing Act 1964	In section 108(3), the words "except paragraph 2(10) of Schedule 1". In Schedule 1, paragraph 2(10).
1964 c. 98	Ministers of the Crown Act 1964	Section 3. In section 5, subsections (1) to (3). Schedule 2.
1965 c. 10	Superannuation (Amendment) Act 1965	In Schedule 1, the entry relating to the House of Commons Disqualification Act 1957.
1965 c. 14	Cereals Marketing Act 1965	In Schedule 1, paragraph 12.
1965 c. 16	Airports Authority Act 1965	In section 25(2), the words "except paragraph 5 of Schedule 1". In Schedule 1, paragraph 5.
1965 c. 22	Law Commissions Act 1965	Section 6(1).
1965 c. 46	Highlands and Islands Development (Scotland) Act 1965	In section 19(2) the words from "except" to "Act 1957". In Schedule 1, paragraph 6.
1966 c. 6	National Insurance Act 1966	Section 13(2).
1966 c. 8	National Health Service Act 1966	In the Schedule, paragraph 8.
1966 c. 20	Ministry of Social Security Act 1966	In section 40(4) the words "the House of Commons Disqualification Act 1957". In Schedule 1, paragraph 7. In Schedule 6, paragraph 15.
1966 c. 34	Industrial Development Act 1966	In section 21(6), the words from "except" to "disqualification)". In section 31(7), paragraph (b) and the word "and" immediately preceding it. In Schedule 3, in Part II, the entry relating to the House of Commons Disqualification Act 1957.
1967 c. 13	Parliamentary Commissioner Act 1967	Section 1(4).
1967 c. 17	Iron and Steel Act 1967	Section 1(8). In section 51(2) the words "(except section 1(8) thereof)".
1967 c. 18	Local Government (Termination of Reviews) Act 1967	In section 3(2) the words from the beginning to "Act 1957".
1967 c. 22	Agriculture Act 1967	Section 73.
1967 c. 80	Criminal Justice Act 1967	In Schedule 2, paragraph 3.
1967 c. 86	Countryside (Scotland) Act 1967	Section 1(7). In section 79(2) the words from "except" to "Act 1957".
1968 c. 24	Commonwealth Telecommunications Act 1968	Section 2(b).
1968 c. 41	Countryside Act 1968	Section 1(6). In section 50, subsection (4) and in subsection (5) the words "and (4)" and "subject to subsection (4) above".
1968 c. 65	Gaming Act 1968	Section 10(4). In section 54(2) the words "(except section 10(4))".
1968 c. 67	Medicines Act 1968	Section 2(6).
1968 c. 71	Race Relations Act 1968	In section 29(4) the words from "except" to "Act 1957". In Schedule 1, paragraph 12. In Schedule 4, paragraph 8.
1968 c. 73	Transport Act 1968	Section 155. In Schedule 17, in Part II, the words "155" and the words from "and so far" to "Part III".
1969 c. 30	Town and Country Planning (Scotland) Act 1969	In section 108(3), the words from "and except" to "Act 1957".
1969 c. 35	Transport (London) Act 1969	In section 47(4) the words from the beginning to "Act 1957".
1969 c. 48	Post Office Act 1969	Section 14(20). In Schedule 1, paragraph 6.
1969 c. 51	Development of Tourism Act 1969	Section 1(4). In section 21(4) the words "except section 1(4)".
1970 c. 40	Agriculture Act 1970	In Schedule 1, paragraph 12.
1970 c. 46	Radiological Protection Act 1970	In Schedule 1, paragraph 6.
1970 c. 51	National Insurance (Old persons' and widows' pensions and attendance allowance) Act 1970	In section 10(3), the words "1 and". In Schedule 2, in Part I, paragraph 1.
1971 c. 18	Land Commission (Dissolution) Act 1971	In section 7(3) the words from "except" to "Act 1957".
1971 c. 23	Courts Act 1971	Section 17(5). In section 59(5) and (6), paragraph (b).
1971 c. 58	Sheriff Courts (Scotland) Act 1971	Section 21. In section 47(3) the words from "and section" to "Act 1957)".
1971 c. 73	Social Security Act 1971	In section 10(2), the words "1 and".
1971 c. 75	Civil Aviation Act 1971	Section 1(5). Section 37(5).
1971 c. 77	Immigration Act 1971	In Schedule 5, paragraphs 4 and 10.
1971 c. 78	Town and Country Planning Act 1971	Section 47(5). In section 295(2) the words from "relates to" to "Act 1957 or".
1972 c. 3	Ministerial and other Salaries Act 1972	In section 1(6) the words from the beginning to the end of paragraph (b) and the word "and" immediately following that paragraph.
1972 c. 41	Finance Act 1972	In Schedule 6, paragraph 8.
1972 c. 52	Town and Country Planning (Scotland) Act 1972	Section 44(5). Section 47(5). In section 281(3) the words from "and relates" to "Act 1957".
1972 c. 54	British Library Act 1972	In the Schedule, paragraph 6.
1972 c. 58	National Health Service (Scotland) Act 1972	Section 42(4). In section 65(3) and (4), the words "42(4)". In Schedule 1, paragraph 6.
1972 c. 60	Gas Act 1972	In section 50(2) the words from "and the" to "Schedule 8)". In Schedule 3, paragraph 4. In Schedule 6, paragraph 7.
1972 c. 62	Agriculture (Miscellaneous Provisions) Act 1972	In section 27(5)(b) the words "to the House of Commons Disqualification Act 1957".
1972 c. 68	European Communities Act 1972	In Schedule 4, paragraph 5(6).
1972 c. 70	Local Government Act 1972	Section 268. In section 274, in subsection (2) the words "section 268 above" and the words from "and the repeals" to "that Act" and in subsection (3) the words from the beginning to "said repeals".
1973 c. 9	Counter-Inflation Act 1973	In Schedule 1, paragraph 9.
1973 c. 32	National Health Service Reorganisation Act 1973	In Schedule 4, paragraph 79 and in paragraphs 147 and 148 the words "42(4)".
1973 c. 37	Water Act 1973	In section 40, in subsection (4)(d) the words "69" and in subsection (5) the words "and paragraph 69 of Schedule 8". In Schedule 8, paragraph 69.
1973 c. 38	Social Security Act 1973	Section 66(3). Section 73(5). In Schedule 7, paragraph 2. In Schedule 27, paragraph 18.
1973 c. 39	Statute Law (Repeals) Act 1973	In Schedule 2, paragraph 3.
1973 c. 41	Fair Trading Act 1973	In Schedule 1, paragraph 4.
1973 c. 50	Employment and Training Act 1973	In section 15(3), the word "4" where it first occurs. In Schedule 3, paragraph 4.
1973 c. 54	Nature Conservancy Act 1973	In section 5(3) the words "and paragraph 19 of Schedule 3 also extends to Northern Ireland". In Schedule 3, paragraph 19.
1973 c. 64	Maplin Development Act 1973	In Schedule 1, paragraph 5.
1973 c. 65	Local Government (Scotland) Act 1973	Section 218(5). Section 224(5). In section 238(3) the words from "and except" to "Act 1957". In Schedule 4, paragraph 3.
1974 c. 7	Local Government Act 1974	In section 43(6) the words from the beginning to "Act 1957". In Schedule 4, paragraph 12.
1974 c. 21	Ministers of the Crown Act 1974	Section 2. Section 3(1).
1974 c. 24	Prices Act 1974	Section 6(3).
1974 c. 37	Health and Safety at Work etc. Act 1974	In section 84(1)(b), the words "2 and". In Schedule 9, paragraph 2.
1974 c. 47	Solicitors Act 1974	In section 90(4)(c), the words "paragraph 5 of Schedule 3". In Schedule 3, paragraph 5.
1974 c. 48	Railways Act 1974	Section 9(3).
1974 c. 52	Trade Union and Labour Relations Act 1974	In section 31(5), the words "the House of Commons Disqualification Act 1957". In Schedule 3, paragraph 6.
1975 c. 18	Social Security (Consequential Provisions) Act 1975	In Schedule 2, paragraph 12.

== Subsequent developments ==
Section 10(2) of, and schedule 3 to, the act were repealed by section 1(1) of, and part XIX of schedule 1 to, the Statute Law (Repeals) Act 1977, which came into force on 16 June 1977.

The act was amended by subsequent legislation:

- The Disqualifications Act 2000, a consequence of the Good Friday Agreement, added the words "other than Ireland", prior to which Irish legislators were disqualified just as any other foreign legislators are. This was to bring them in line with treatment of Commonwealth legislators; however, as of 2022 no one has taken advantage of this privilege.
- Previously, all ministers of the Church of Scotland, priests, and deacons were disqualified. The House of Commons (Removal of Clergy Disqualification) Act 2001 restricted this disqualification to only Lords Spiritual, i.e. the most senior Anglican bishops who already sit in the House of Lords ex officio.
- Various enactments have amended the lists of disqualified bodies and offices, particularly as they have come in or out of existence or fallen out of government control.
- The Representation of the People Act 1981 provides for the automatic disqualification of parliamentary candidates or expulsion of sitting MPs if they serve an imprisonment of over a year. The nomination of a disqualified candidate is voided. The election of such a candidate or the re-election of an MP thus imprisoned will also be voided, leading to a by-election in their constituency.
- The Wales Act 2014 and Northern Ireland (Miscellaneous Provisions) Act 2014 respectively made members of Senedd Cymru (Welsh Parliament), formerly the National Assembly for Wales until May 2020, or the Northern Ireland Assembly ineligible for the House of Commons.
- The Scottish Parliament (Disqualification of Members of the House of Commons) Regulations 2025, an implementing instrument for the Scottish Elections (Representation and Reform) Act 2025 that amended the Scotland Act 1998, provides that an MP who is elected member of the Scottish Parliament (MSP) or vice versa, since 2026, has 49 days to vacate either office.
- The English Devolution and Community Empowerment Act 2026 also disqualifies the mayor of a combined authority or combined county authority area from serving as an MP or conversely after eight days into either term.

== See also ==
- Ministerial and Other Salaries Act 1975
- Ministerial and other Maternity Allowances Act 2021
