= House of Commons (Removal of Clergy Disqualification) Act 2001 =

Act of the Parliament of the United Kingdom

House of Commons (Removal of Clergy Disqualification) Act 2001 (Note: Section 2(1).)
- Act of Parliament
- Parliament of the United Kingdom
- Long title: An Act to remove any disqualification from membership of the House of Commons that arises by reason of a person having been ordained or being a minister of a religious denomination and to continue the disqualification of Lords Spiritual from such membership.
- Citation: 2001 c. 13
- Territorial extent: England and Wales; Scotland; Northern Ireland; (Note: Section 2(3).)

Dates
- Royal assent: 11 May 2001
- Commencement: 11 May 2001 (Note: The Acts of Parliament (Commencement) Act 1793.)
Other legislation
Amends	Roman Catholic Relief Act 1829; Clerical Disabilities Act 1870; Welsh Church Act 1914; House of Commons Disqualification Act 1975; Representation of the People Act 1983; Scotland Act 1998; Northern Ireland Act 1998
Repeals/revokes	House of Commons (Clergy Disqualification) Act 1801
Amended by	European Parliamentary Elections Act 2002; Government of Wales Act 2006
Relates to	House of Commons (Clergy Disqualification) Act 1801; House of Commons Disqualification Act 1975

Status: Amended

Text of statute as originally enacted

Revised text of statute as amended

The House of Commons (Removal of Clergy Disqualification) Act 2001 (c. 13) is an act of the Parliament of the United Kingdom.

== Background ==
House of Commons (Clergy Disqualification) Act 1801 (Note: The citation of this act by this short title was authorised by section 1 of, and the first schedule to, the Short Titles Act 1896. Due to the repeal of those provisions it is now authorised by section 19(2) of the Interpretation Act 1978.)
- Act of Parliament
- Parliament of the United Kingdom
- Long title: An Act to remove Doubts respecting the Eligibility of Persons in Holy Orders to sit in the House of Commons.
- Citation: 41 Geo. 3. (U.K.) c. 63

Dates
- Royal assent: 23 June 1801
- Commencement: 23 June 1801
- Repealed: 11 May 2001
Other legislation
Amended by	Statute Law Revision Act 1872; Statute Law Revision Act 1888; Administration of Justice Act 1965
Repealed by	House of Commons (Removal of Clergy Disqualification) Act 2001

Status: Repealed

Text of statute as originally enacted

Revised text of statute as amended

Previously clergy were disqualified to sit in the House of Commons due to the House of Commons (Clergy Disqualification) Act 1801 (41 Geo. 3. (U.K.) c. 63) and section 10 of the House of Commons Disqualification Act 1975.

The bill was a reaction to the selection of David Cairns, a laicised Catholic priest, as the Labour candidate for the safe seat of Greenock and Inverclyde. Member of Parliament Siobhain McDonagh had previously introduced similar legislation in 1999, but it had run out of parliamentary time.

== Criticism ==
The legislation was criticised by Conservative shadow minister Ann Widdecombe for, in her view, leading to conflict between "God and Caesar.

== See also ==
- James Godfrey MacManaway
