= Public Audit (Wales) Act 2004 =

Act of the Parliament of the United Kingdom

Public Audit (Wales) Act 2004 (Note: Section 75.)
- Act of Parliament
- Parliament of the United Kingdom
- Long title: An Act to confer further functions on the Auditor General for Wales; to make provision about the audit of accounts of public bodies in Wales and related matters; to make provision about economy, efficiency and effectiveness in relation to public bodies and registered social landlords in Wales; and for connected purposes.
- Citation: 2004 c. 23
- Territorial extent: England and Wales, except that the amendment or repeal of a provision by this act has the same extent as the provision amended or repealed. (Note: Section 74.)

Dates
- Royal assent: 16 September 2004
- Commencement: Various (Note: Section 73.)
Other legislation
| Amends | Local Government Act 1972; Housing Associations Act 1985; Airports Act 1986; Town and Country Planning Act 1990; Social Security Administration Act 1992; Health Service Commissioners Act 1993; Audit Commission Act 1998; Government of Wales Act 1998; Local Government Act 1999; Care Standards Act 2000; Health (Wales) Act 2003; Local Government Act 2003 |
| Amended by | Constitutional Reform Act 2005; Public Audit (Wales) Act 2004 (Relaxation of Restriction on Disclosure) Order 2005; Health Act 2006; Government of Wales Act 2006; National Health Service (Consequential Provisions) Act 2006; Education and Inspections Act 2006; Police and Justice Act 2006; Offender Management Act 2007; Serious Crime Act 2007; Health and Social Care Act 2008; Offender Management Act 2007 (Consequential Amendments) Order 2008; Local Government (Wales) Measure 2009; Housing and Regeneration Act 2008; Housing and Regeneration Act 2008 (Consequential Provisions) Order 2010; Localism Act 2011; Police Reform and Social Responsibility Act 2011; Welfare Reform Act 2012; Public Bodies (Abolition of Her Majesty’s Inspectorate of Courts Administration and the Public Guardian Board) Order 2012; Crime and Courts Act 2013; Public Audit (Wales) Act 2013; Local Audit and Accountability Act 2014; Public Audit (Wales) Act 2013 (Consequential Amendments) Order 2014; Regulation and Inspection of Social Care (Wales) Act 2016; Investigatory Powers Act 2016; Data Protection Act 2018; Public Services Ombudsman (Wales) Act 2019; Local Government and Elections (Wales) Act 2021; Public Audit (Wales) Act 2004 (Amendment) (Local Government Bodies in Wales) Order 2021; Local Government and Elections (Wales) Act 2021 (Consequential Amendments) Regulations 2021; Local Government and Elections (Wales) Act 2021 (Consequential Amendments and Miscellaneous Provisions) Regulations 2021; Corporate Joint Committees (General) (No. 2) (Wales) Regulations 2021; Corporate Joint Committees (General) (No. 2) (Wales) Regulations 2022; Judicial Review and Courts Act 2022 (Magistrates’ Court Sentencing Powers) Regulations 2023; Legislative Reform (Disclosure of Adult Social Care Data) Order 2025 |

Status: Amended

Text of statute as originally enacted

Revised text of statute as amended

The Public Audit (Wales) Act 2004 (c. 23) is an act of the Parliament of the United Kingdom relating to public audit in relation to Welsh devolution.

== Background ==
In 2002, the Welsh Government proposed that the functions of the National Audit Office in Wales and the functions of the Audit Commission in Wales be merged into a new audit body. These proposals were approved by the National Assembly. In 2003, the draft bill was published.

== Provisions ==
The act merges the functions of the National Audit Office in Wales and the functions of the Audit Commission in Wales into a new audit body.

The Code of Audit and Inspection Practice is prepared by the Auditor General for Wales under the act.

=== Commencement ===
The following commencement orders have been made for this act:

- Public Audit (Wales) Act 2004 (Commencement No. 1) Order 2005 (SI 2005/71)
- Public Audit (Wales) Act 2004 (Commencement No. 2 and Transitional Provisions and Savings) Order 2005 (SI 2005/558)
- Public Audit (Wales) Act 2004 (Commencement No. 3) Order 2005] (SI 2005/1911)

== Further developments ==
The Wales Audit Office was established in 2005.

== Reception ==
The Welsh Local Government criticised the publication of the draft bill, because there had been no consultation.
