= Corporate parent =

Corporate parent can refer to:

- in business, a holding company
- the principles set out in the Children and Social Work Act 2017 concerning the corporate parenting role of a local authority in relation to looked after children.
