= National Health Service (Consequential Provisions) Act 2006 =

Act of the Parliament of the United Kingdom

National Health Service (Consequential Provisions) Act 2006 (Note: Section 8(1).)
- Act of Parliament
- Parliament of the United Kingdom
- Long title: An Act to make provision for repeals, revocations, consequential amendments, transitional and transitory modifications and savings in connection with the consolidation of enactments in the National Health Service Act 2006 and the National Health Service (Wales) Act 2006.
- Citation: 2006 c. 43
- Territorial extent: England and Wales (Note: Section 7(1).)

Dates
- Royal assent: 8 November 2006
- Commencement: 1 March 2007, subject to section 8 (Note: Section 8(2).)
Other legislation
Amends	List: Voluntary Hospitals (Paying Patients) Act 1936; Polish Resettlement Act 1947; National Assistance Act 1948; Law Reform (Personal Injuries) Act 1948; Reserve and Auxiliary Forces (Protection of Civil Interests) Act 1951; Landlord and Tenant Act 1954; Pharmacy Act 1954; Disabled Persons (Employment) Act 1958; Public Records Act 1958; Mental Health Act 1959; Public Bodies (Admission to Meetings) Act 1960; Superannuation (Miscellaneous Provisions) Act 1967; Abortion Act 1967; Leasehold Reform Act 1967; Health Services and Public Health Act 1968; Social Work (Scotland) Act 1968; Medicines Act 1968; Employers' Liability (Compulsory Insurance) Act 1969; Finance Act 1971; Local Government Act 1972; House of Commons Disqualification Act 1975; Race Relations Act 1976; Patents Act 1977; Acquisition of Land Act 1981; Mental Health Act 1983; Health and Social Services and Social Security Adjudications Act 1983; National Audit Act 1983; Medical Act 1983; Public Health (Control of Disease) Act 1984; Dentists Act 1984; Video Recordings Act 1984; Greater London Council (General Powers) Act 1984; Disabled Persons (Services, Consultation and Representation) Act 1986; Company Directors Disqualification Act 1986; National Health Service (Amendment) Act 1986; AIDS (Control) Act 1987; Income and Corporation Taxes Act 1988; Local Government Act 1988; Dartford-Thurrock Crossing Act 1988; Community Health Councils (Access to Information) Act 1988; Local Government Finance Act 1988; Copyright, Designs and Patents Act 1988; Health and Medicines Act 1988; Road Traffic Act 1988; Children Act 1989; Opticians Act 1989; National Health Service and Community Care Act 1990; Access to Health Records Act 1990; Water Industry Act 1991; London Local Authorities Act 1991; Social Security Contributions and Benefits Act 1992; Local Government Finance Act 1992; Trade Union and Labour Relations (Consolidation) Act 1992; Tribunals and Inquiries Act 1992; Judicial Pensions and Retirement Act 1993; Charities Act 1993; Welsh Language Act 1993; Health Service Commissioners Act 1993; Vehicle Excise and Registration Act 1994; Value Added Tax Act 1994; Health Authorities Act 1995; Employment Rights Act 1996; Education Act 1996; Audit Commission Act 1998; Data Protection Act 1998; Government of Wales Act 1998; Health Act 1999; Care Standards Act 2000; Learning and Skills Act 2000; Local Government Act 2000; Regulation of Investigatory Powers Act 2000; Freedom of Information Act 2000; Criminal Justice and Court Services Act 2000; Health and Social Care Act 2001; Anti-terrorism, Crime and Security Act 2001; International Development Act 2002; National Health Service Reform and Health Care Professions Act 2002; Nationality, Immigration and Asylum Act 2002; Community Care (Delayed Discharges etc.) Act 2003; Finance Act 2003; Licensing Act 2003; Sexual Offences Act 2003; Health and Social Care (Community Health and Standards) Act 2003; Criminal Justice Act 2003; Finance Act 2004; Health Protection Agency Act 2004; Public Audit (Wales) Act 2004; Domestic Violence, Crime and Victims Act 2004; Children Act 2004; Housing Act 2004; Civil Contingencies Act 2004; Constitutional Reform Act 2005; Income Tax (Trading and Other Income) Act 2005; Mental Capacity Act 2005; Public Services Ombudsman (Wales) Act 2005; Health Act 2006; Government of Wales Act 2006; Commissioner for Older People (Wales) Act 2006; NHS Redress Act 2006; See § Repealed enactments
Repeals/revokes	See § Repealed enactments
Amended by	Mental Health Act 2007; Local Government and Public Involvement in Health Act 2007; Education and Skills Act 2008; Local Health Boards (Directed Functions) (Wales) Regulations 2009; Corporation Tax Act 2010; Transfer of Tribunal Functions Order 2010; Charities Act 2011; Equality Act 2010 (Public Authorities and Consequential and Supplementary Amendments) Order 2011; Welfare Reform Act 2012; Health and Social Care Act 2012; Finance Act 2012; Health and Social Care Act 2012 (Consequential Amendments) Order 2013; Local Audit and Accountability Act 2014; Immigration Act 2016; Investigatory Powers Act 2016; Social Services and Well-being (Wales) Act 2014 (Consequential Amendments) Regulations 2016; Additional Learning Needs and Education Tribunal (Wales) Act 2018; Legislation (Procedure, Publication and Repeals) (Wales) Act 2025
Relates to	National Health Service Act 2006; National Health Service (Wales) Act 2006

Status: Amended

History of passage through Parliament

Text of statute as originally enacted

Revised text of statute as amended

The National Health Service (Consequential Provisions) Act 2006 (c. 43) is an act of the Parliament of the United Kingdom.

The act repeals, revokes and amends legislation as a consequence of the National Health Service Act 2006 and the National Health Service (Wales) Act 2006.

== Provisions ==
Schedule 1 to the act made consequential amendments to various acts of Parliament and statutory instruments. Schedules 2 and 3 made transitional and transitory modifications and savings in connection with the consolidation.

=== Repealed enactments ===
Section 6 of the act repealed 52 enactments and revoked 23 instruments, listed in schedule 4 to the act.

Citation	Short title	Extent of repeal or revocation
1977 c. 49	National Health Service Act 1977	The whole Act.
1979 c. 23	Public Health Laboratory Service Act 1979	Section 1(1) and (2).
1979 c. 23	Public Health Laboratory Service Act 1979	Section 3.
1980 c. 53	Health Services Act 1980	Section 3(1).
1980 c. 53	Health Services Act 1980	Section 5(1).
1980 c. 53	Health Services Act 1980	Section 8.
1980 c. 53	Health Services Act 1980	Section 21(2).
1980 c. 53	Health Services Act 1980	In Schedule 1, paragraphs 52, 66, 68, 77 and 83.
1980 c. 53	Health Services Act 1980	In Schedule 5, paragraphs 1, 2(1), 2(5) and 4.
1981 c. 61	British Nationality Act 1981	In Schedule 7, the entry for the National Health Service Act 1977.
1981 c. 64	New Towns Act 1981	In Schedule 12, paragraph 26.
1981 c. 67	Acquisition of Land Act 1981	In Schedule 4, paragraph 28.
1982 c. 51	Mental Health (Amendment) Act 1982	In Schedule 3, paragraph 56.
1983 c. 20	Mental Health Act 1983	In Schedule 4, paragraph 47.
1983 c. 41	Health and Social Services and Social Security Adjudications Act 1983	Section 1.
1983 c. 41	Health and Social Services and Social Security Adjudications Act 1983	Section 13.
1983 c. 41	Health and Social Services and Social Security Adjudications Act 1983	Section 15(b).
1983 c. 41	Health and Social Services and Social Security Adjudications Act 1983	In Schedule 5, paragraphs 1 and 2.
1983 c. 41	Health and Social Services and Social Security Adjudications Act 1983	In Schedule 6, paragraph 3.
1983 c. 41	Health and Social Services and Social Security Adjudications Act 1983	In Schedule 9, paragraphs 21 and 23.
1983 c. 54	Medical Act 1983	In Schedule 5, paragraph 16(b).
1984 c. 24	Dentists Act 1984	In Schedule 5, paragraphs 9 and 10.
1984 c. 48	Health and Social Security Act 1984	Section 1(3), (4) and (6).
1984 c. 48	Health and Social Security Act 1984	Section 5(2).
1984 c. 48	Health and Social Security Act 1984	Section 9(1).
1984 c. 48	Health and Social Security Act 1984	In Schedule 1, paragraphs 1 and 3.
1984 c. 48	Health and Social Security Act 1984	In Schedule 3, paragraphs 1, 3(b) and 8.
1985 c. 71	Housing (Consequential Provisions) Act 1985	In Schedule 2, paragraph 38.
SI 1985/39	Family Practitioner Committees (Consequential Modifications) Order 1985	Article 7.
1986 c. 66	National Health Service (Amendment) Act 1986	Section 3(1).
1987 c. 33	AIDS (Control) Act 1987	In section 1(9), the words ""Health Authority" means a Health Authority established under section 8 of that Act,".
SI 1987/2202	Pharmaceutical Qualifications (EEC Recognition) Order 1987	Article 4.
1988 c. 7	Social Security Act 1988	Section 14(1).
1988 c. 24	Community Health Councils (Access to Information) Act 1988	Section 1(6).
1988 c. 49	Health and Medicines Act 1988	Section 7(10) and (12).
1988 c. 49	Health and Medicines Act 1988	Section 10(1).
1988 c. 49	Health and Medicines Act 1988	Section 11(1) to (3).
1988 c. 49	Health and Medicines Act 1988	Section 13(1).
1988 c. 49	Health and Medicines Act 1988	In section 13(2), the words "of Schedule 12 to that Act".
1988 c. 49	Health and Medicines Act 1988	Section 13(3).
1988 c. 49	Health and Medicines Act 1988	In Schedule 2, paragraphs 1, 2, 7(3) and (4) and 8(1).
1989 c. 41	Children Act 1989	In Schedule 12, paragraph 34.
1990 c. 11	Planning (Consequential Provisions) Act 1990	In Schedule 2, paragraph 40.
1990 c. 19	National Health Service and Community Care Act 1990	Section 1(3).
1990 c. 19	National Health Service and Community Care Act 1990	Sections 4 to 12.
1990 c. 19	National Health Service and Community Care Act 1990	Section 21.
1990 c. 19	National Health Service and Community Care Act 1990	Sections 25 and 26.
1990 c. 19	National Health Service and Community Care Act 1990	Section 65(2).
1990 c. 19	National Health Service and Community Care Act 1990	In section 67(4), the words "Part 1 of this Act other than section 15(4), does not extend to Scotland".
1990 c. 19	National Health Service and Community Care Act 1990	In Schedule 1, paragraphs 7(1) and 8 to 10.
1990 c. 19	National Health Service and Community Care Act 1990	Schedules 2 and 3.
1990 c. 19	National Health Service and Community Care Act 1990	In Schedule 9, paragraph 18.
1990 c. 23	Access to Health Records Act 1990	In section 11, the definition of "Health Authority".
SI 1991/195	Health and Personal Social Services (Northern Ireland Consequential Amendments) Order 1991	Article 7(1), (3) to (5) and (9).
1994 c. 19	Local Government (Wales) Act 1994	In Schedule 10, paragraph 11.
1994 c. 22	Vehicle Excise and Registration Act 1994	In Schedule 3, paragraph 10.
1995 c. 17	Health Authorities Act 1995	Section 3(8).
1995 c. 17	Health Authorities Act 1995	In Schedule 1, Part 1, and paragraphs 66, 68 to 72, 78, 79, 85 and 119(4)(a).
1996 c. 15	National Health Service (Residual Liabilities) Act 1996	Section 1.
1996 c. 18	Employment Rights Act 1996	In Schedule 1, paragraph 45(2).
1996 c. 56	Education Act 1996	In Schedule 37, paragraphs 44 to 46.
SI 1996/2325	Housing Act 1996 (Consequential Provisions) Order 1996	In Schedule 2, paragraph 9.
1997 c. 19	Pharmacists (Fitness to Practise) Act 1997	In the Schedule, paragraph 6.
1997 c. 46	National Health Service (Primary Care) Act 1997	Section 21(1).
1997 c. 46	National Health Service (Primary Care) Act 1997	Section 22(1).
1997 c. 46	National Health Service (Primary Care) Act 1997	Section 26(1).
1997 c. 46	National Health Service (Primary Care) Act 1997	Section 27(1).
1997 c. 46	National Health Service (Primary Care) Act 1997	Section 28(1).
1997 c. 46	National Health Service (Primary Care) Act 1997	Section 29(1).
1997 c. 46	National Health Service (Primary Care) Act 1997	Section 31(1).
1997 c. 46	National Health Service (Primary Care) Act 1997	Section 34(1).
1997 c. 46	National Health Service (Primary Care) Act 1997	Section 36.
1997 c. 46	National Health Service (Primary Care) Act 1997	In section 40(2), the definition of "the 1977 Act".
1997 c. 46	National Health Service (Primary Care) Act 1997	In Schedule 2, paragraphs 3, 4, 5, 14, 15, 22, 23, 27, 28, 30, 31 and 65.
1997 c. 56	National Health Service (Private Finance) Act 1997	Section 1.
1998 c. 18	Audit Commission Act 1998	In Schedule 3, paragraph 20.
1998 c. 31	School Standards and Framework Act 1998	In Schedule 30, paragraph 8.
1998 c. 38	Government of Wales Act 1998	Section 27(6) and (7).
1999 c. 8	Health Act 1999	Sections 2 to 12.
1999 c. 8	Health Act 1999	Section 13(1) to (4) and (6) to (11).
1999 c. 8	Health Act 1999	Sections 14 and 15.
1999 c. 8	Health Act 1999	Section 17.
1999 c. 8	Health Act 1999	Sections 26 to 39.
1999 c. 8	Health Act 1999	Sections 41 and 42.
1999 c. 8	Health Act 1999	In section 62, in subsection (1), the words ", unless it is an order under paragraph 2 of Schedule 2A", subsections (2) and (3), in subsection (4), the words ", or to give directions mentioned in subsection (2),", and subsections (5) and (8).
1999 c. 8	Health Act 1999	In section 64, the definitions of "the 1977 Act", "the 1990 Act" and paragraph (a) of the definition of "NHS trust".
1999 c. 8	Health Act 1999	Section 68(1)(a) and (4).
1999 c. 8	Health Act 1999	Schedule 1.
1999 c. 8	Health Act 1999	Schedule 2A.
1999 c. 8	Health Act 1999	In Schedule 4, paragraphs 4, 6 to 16, 23 to 32, 36 to 39, 76 to 79, 81, 83, 84, 87 and 89.
1999 c. 33	Immigration and Asylum Act 1999	Section 117(2).
SI 1999/672	National Assembly for Wales (Transfer of Functions) Order 1999	In Schedule 1, the entries relating to the National Health Service Act 1977 and the National Health Service and Community Care Act 1990, and paragraph (a) of the entry relating to the Health Act 1999.
SI 1999/2795	Health Act 1999 (Supplementary and Consequential Provisions) Order 1999	The whole order.
SI 2000/90	Health Act 1999 (Supplementary, Consequential etc Provisions) Order 2000	In Schedule 1, paragraph 13.
2000 c. 20	Government Resources and Accounts Act 2000	Sections 12 and 13.
2000 c. 22	Local Government Act 2000	In Schedule 5, paragraph 17.
2000 c. 36	Freedom of Information Act 2000	In Schedule 1, paragraph 37.
2001 c. 15	Health and Social Care Act 2001	Sections 1 to 4.
2001 c. 15	Health and Social Care Act 2001	Section 6.
2001 c. 15	Health and Social Care Act 2001	Section 7(2) to (5).
2001 c. 15	Health and Social Care Act 2001	Sections 8 to 13.
2001 c. 15	Health and Social Care Act 2001	Section 14(1) and (3).
2001 c. 15	Health and Social Care Act 2001	Section 16.
2001 c. 15	Health and Social Care Act 2001	Sections 20 and 21.
2001 c. 15	Health and Social Care Act 2001	Sections 23 to 25.
2001 c. 15	Health and Social Care Act 2001	Section 27.
2001 c. 15	Health and Social Care Act 2001	Sections 28 to 38.
2001 c. 15	Health and Social Care Act 2001	Sections 40 to 43.
2001 c. 15	Health and Social Care Act 2001	Sections 45 to 48.
2001 c. 15	Health and Social Care Act 2001	Sections 60 and 61.
2001 c. 15	Health and Social Care Act 2001	Section 64(3).
2001 c. 15	Health and Social Care Act 2001	Section 68(2) and (3).
2001 c. 15	Health and Social Care Act 2001	Schedules 1 to 4.
2001 c. 15	Health and Social Care Act 2001	In Schedule 5, paragraphs 5, 8, 11 and 12.
2001 c. 24	Anti-terrorism, Crime and Security Act 2001	In Schedule 4, paragraphs 16 and 45.
SI 2001/3649	Financial Services and Markets Act 2000 (Consequential Amendments and Repeals) Order 2001	Article 319.
2002 c. 17	National Health Service Reform and Health Care Professions Act 2002	Section 1.
2002 c. 17	National Health Service Reform and Health Care Professions Act 2002	Section 2(1) to (4).
2002 c. 17	National Health Service Reform and Health Care Professions Act 2002	Section 3.
2002 c. 17	National Health Service Reform and Health Care Professions Act 2002	Section 4(2).
2002 c. 17	National Health Service Reform and Health Care Professions Act 2002	Section 5.
2002 c. 17	National Health Service Reform and Health Care Professions Act 2002	Sections 6 to 10.
2002 c. 17	National Health Service Reform and Health Care Professions Act 2002	Sections 15 to 18.
2002 c. 17	National Health Service Reform and Health Care Professions Act 2002	Sections 19(1) to (5).
2002 c. 17	National Health Service Reform and Health Care Professions Act 2002	Sections 20 and 21.
2002 c. 17	National Health Service Reform and Health Care Professions Act 2002	In section 22, subsections (1) to (3) and (8) and (9).
2002 c. 17	National Health Service Reform and Health Care Professions Act 2002	Sections 23 and 24.
2002 c. 17	National Health Service Reform and Health Care Professions Act 2002	Section 36.
2002 c. 17	National Health Service Reform and Health Care Professions Act 2002	In section 38(2), "36 or".
2002 c. 17	National Health Service Reform and Health Care Professions Act 2002	In section 38(3), "or an order under section 36,".
2002 c. 17	National Health Service Reform and Health Care Professions Act 2002	In section 42(2), the definitions of "the 1977 Act" and "NHS trust".
2002 c. 17	National Health Service Reform and Health Care Professions Act 2002	In Schedule 1, Part 1 and paragraphs 40 to 43, 46, 51 to 53 and 55.
2002 c. 17	National Health Service Reform and Health Care Professions Act 2002	In Schedule 2, paragraphs 1 and 2, 12 to 37, 54, 58, 67, 69, and 73 to 82.
2002 c. 17	National Health Service Reform and Health Care Professions Act 2002	In Schedule 3, paragraphs 1, 7, 8, 11 and 14.
2002 c. 17	National Health Service Reform and Health Care Professions Act 2002	Schedule 4.
2002 c. 17	National Health Service Reform and Health Care Professions Act 2002	In Schedule 5, paragraphs 4 to 20, 23, 31 to 33, 36, 43, 45, and 49 to 51.
2002 c. 17	National Health Service Reform and Health Care Professions Act 2002	In Schedule 6, paragraphs 1 to 15.
2002 c. 17	National Health Service Reform and Health Care Professions Act 2002	In Schedule 8, paragraphs 1 to 9, 12, 18, 23 to 27, and 30 to 37.
2002 c. 38	Adoption and Children Act 2002	In Schedule 3, paragraph 20.
2002 c. 41	Nationality, Immigration and Asylum Act 2002	Section 45(7).
SI 2002/253	Nursing and Midwifery Order 2001	In Schedule 5, paragraph 6.
SI 2002/2469	National Health Service Reform and Health Care Professions Act 2002 (Supplementary, Consequential etc. Provisions) Regulations 2002	In Schedule 1, paragraphs 21 and 30.
SI 2002/2759	National Health Service Act 1977 and National Health Service and Community Care Act 1990 (Amendment) Regulations	The whole Regulations.
2003 c. 4	Health (Wales) Act 2003	Section 1(1), (3) and (4).
2003 c. 4	Health (Wales) Act 2003	Schedule 1.
2003 c. 4	Health (Wales) Act 2003	In Schedule 3, paragraphs 3, 4, 6 and 9.
2003 c. 43	Health and Social Care (Community Health and Standards) Act 2003	Sections 1 to 32.
2003 c. 43	Health and Social Care (Community Health and Standards) Act 2003	Section 33(2).
2003 c. 43	Health and Social Care (Community Health and Standards) Act 2003	Sections 35 to 40.
2003 c. 43	Health and Social Care (Community Health and Standards) Act 2003	Sections 170 to 172, 174, 175, and 177 to 183.
2003 c. 43	Health and Social Care (Community Health and Standards) Act 2003	In section 195(1), "or a power to make an order conferred by Part 1".
2003 c. 43	Health and Social Care (Community Health and Standards) Act 2003	Sections 191 and 192.
2003 c. 43	Health and Social Care (Community Health and Standards) Act 2003	Schedule 1.
2003 c. 43	Health and Social Care (Community Health and Standards) Act 2003	In Schedule 2, paragraphs 1 to 5(2), and 5(4) to 16.
2003 c. 43	Health and Social Care (Community Health and Standards) Act 2003	Schedule 3.
2003 c. 43	Health and Social Care (Community Health and Standards) Act 2003	In Schedule 4, paragraphs 23 to 32, 34 to 45, 83 to 85, 108, 109, 115 to 118, 123 and 124.
2003 c. 43	Health and Social Care (Community Health and Standards) Act 2003	Schedule 5.
2003 c. 43	Health and Social Care (Community Health and Standards) Act 2003	In Schedule 9, paragraph 9.
2003 c. 43	Health and Social Care (Community Health and Standards) Act 2003	In Schedule 11, paragraphs 7 to 10, 12 to 16, 18 to 32, 35 to 37, 39 to 45 and 69 to 74.
2003 c. 43	Health and Social Care (Community Health and Standards) Act 2003	In Schedule 13, paragraphs 4 and 6(a) and (b).
2003 c. 44	Criminal Justice Act 2003	In Schedule 25, paragraph 74.
SI 2003/154	Health, Social Care and Well-being Strategies (Wales) Regulations 2003	In the Schedule, paragraphs 5 to 19.
SI 2003/1250	General and Specialist Medical Practice (Education, Training and Qualifications) Order 2003	In Schedule 9, paragraphs 2 and 6(c)(i).
SI 2003/1590	Health Professions Order 2001 (Consequential Amendments) Order 2003	In the Schedule, paragraph 3.
SI 2003/1937	National Health Service Reform and Health Care Professions Act 2002 (Supplementary, Consequential etc Provisions) Regulations 2003	In the Schedule, paragraph 1.
2004 c. 17	Health Protection Agency Act 2004	In Schedule 3, paragraph 11.
2004 c. 23	Public Audit (Wales) Act 2004	In Schedule 2, paragraph 14.
SI 2004/957	Primary Medical Services (Scotland) Act 2004 (Consequential Modifications) Order 2004	In the Schedule, paragraph 3.
SI 2004/1771	Health Act 1999 (Consequential Amendments) (Nursing and Midwifery) Order 2004	In the Schedule, paragraph 8.
SI 2004/2987	Health and Social Care (Community Health and Standards) Act 2003 (Commission for Healthcare Audit and Inspection and Commission for Social Care Inspection) (Consequential Provisions) Order 2004	Article 2(1)(c) and (d).
SI 2004/3363	Freedom of Information (Removal and Relaxation of Statutory Prohibitions on Disclosure of Information) Order 2004	Article 7.
2005 c. 4	Constitutional Reform Act 2005	In Schedule 4, paragraph 95.
2005 c. 4	Constitutional Reform Act 2005	In Schedule 7, the entry relating to the National Health Service Act 1977.
2005 c. 10	Public Services Ombudsman (Wales) Act 2005	In Schedule 6, paragraph 20.
SI 2005/848	Opticians Act 1989 (Amendment) Order 2005	In Schedule 1, paragraph 9.
SI 2005/2011	Dentists Act 1984 (Amendment) Order 2005	In Schedule 6, paragraph 1.
2006 c. 28	Health Act 2006	Sections 34 and 35.
2006 c. 28	Health Act 2006	Section 36(1).
2006 c. 28	Health Act 2006	Sections 37 to 42.
2006 c. 28	Health Act 2006	Sections 44 to 56.
2006 c. 28	Health Act 2006	Section 74.
2006 c. 28	Health Act 2006	Section 78(3).
2006 c. 28	Health Act 2006	Schedule 3.
2006 c. 28	Health Act 2006	In Schedule 8, paragraphs 6 to 22, 24, 25, 29, 34, 36, 44(5), 46, 50, 51 and 54.
SI 2006/1056	Smoking, Health and Social Care (Scotland) Act 2005 (Consequential Modifications) (England, Wales and Northern Ireland) Order 2006	In the Schedule, paragraphs 3 and 5.
SI 2006/1407	National Health Service (Pre-consolidation Amendments) Order 2006	The whole order.
