= Local Government and Public Involvement in Health Act 2007 =

Act of the Parliament of the United Kingdom

Local Government and Public Involvement in Health Act 2007 (Note: Section 246.)
- Act of Parliament
- Parliament of the United Kingdom
- Long title: An Act to make provision with respect to local government and the functions and procedures of local authorities and certain other authorities; to make provision with respect to persons with functions of inspection and audit in relation to local government; to establish the Valuation Tribunal for England; to make provision in connection with local involvement networks; to abolish Patients' Forums and the Commission for Patient and Public Involvement in Health; to make provision with respect to local consultation in connection with health services; and for connected purposes.
- Citation: 2007 c. 28
- Introduced by: Ruth Kelly MP, Secretary of State for Communities and Local Government (Commons); Baroness Morgan of Drefelin (Lords)
- Territorial extent: England and Wales; Scotland (in part); Northern Ireland (in part); (Note: Section 244.)

Dates
- Royal assent: 30 October 2007
- Commencement: Various (Note: Section 245.)
Other legislation
| Amends | House of Commons Disqualification Act 1975; Rent Act 1977; Public Health (Control of Disease) Act 1984; Housing Associations Act 1985; Town and Country Planning Act 1990; Land Drainage Act 1991; Social Security Administration Act 1992; Health Service Commissioners Act 1993; Police Act 1996; Public Audit (Wales) Act 2004; Constitutional Reform Act 2005; National Health Service Act 2006; National Health Service (Wales) Act 2006; National Health Service (Consequential Provisions) Act 2006; Government of Wales Act 2006 |
| Amended by | Charities Act 2011; Policing and Crime Act 2017 |

Status: Amended

History of passage through Parliament

Text of statute as originally enacted

Revised text of statute as amended

The Local Government and Public Involvement in Health Act 2007 (c. 28) is an act of the Parliament of the United Kingdom.

The act allows for the implementation of many provisions outlined in the Government white paper Strong and Prosperous Communities including changes to local government in England. One provision is that civil parishes may now be established in the London boroughs.

== Legislative history ==
The bill for this act had its third reading in the House of Commons on 22 May 2007 and in the House of Lords on 22 October 2007. It received Royal Assent on 30 October.

== Provisions ==
The act replaces patient forums with local involvement networks.

=== Structural and boundary change in England ===
The act allows for local authorities in two-tier areas to be reorganised into unitary authorities. This can take any one of a number of forms:

1. a single council for a county
2. a single council for one or more districts in the local authority
3. a council that includes the adjoining areas
4. a combination of councils of the second and third forms.

The Secretary of State can invite a principal authority in a two-tier area of England to submit a proposal to form a single tier of local government.

This Part came into force on 1 November 2007, subject to certain savings.

=== Executive arrangements ===
The act removes the council-manager model of governance from local authorities by amending the Local Government Act 2000. The council-manager model had only been adopted by Stoke-on-Trent City Council.

=== Parishes ===
District councils became responsible for district councils may carry out reviews of community governance and make changes to the parish councils in their area - this may include the creation or abolition of a parish council.

The act allowed the establishment of parish councils in London, which had all been abolished in 1963 by the London Government Act 1963. The first parish council to be established in London was Queen's Park.

Parish councils became able to appoint unelected members and to co-opt members to fill vacant seats.

=== Ethical standards ===
The act devolved powers of the Standards Board to local authorities' standards committees, with the Standards Board taking on a regulatory role.

=== Healthcare ===
The act places a requirement on NHS organisations to consult the public and patients.

The act replaced patients' forums with local involvement networks. The act also disestablished the Commission for Patient and Public Involvement in Health.

=== Impact in Wales ===
Schedule 17 of the act amends Schedule 5 of the Government of Wales Act 2006 therefore giving the National Assembly for Wales legislative competence in the sphere of local government. These powers will allow the Assembly to pass measures that can change the structure, boundaries and composition of local councils in Wales.

== See also ==
- Local Government Act
- Patient and public involvement
