= Health care bill =

Health care bill may refer to any proposed law on the subject of health care. Examples include the

- Affordable Health Care for America Act (H.R. 3962), an unsuccessful bill passed by the U.S. House in November 2009 (also known as the "House bill")
- Health Care and Education Reconciliation Act of 2010 (H.R. 4872), a reconciliation bill passed by the U.S. House in March 2010, changing the Patient Protection and Affordable Care Act
- Patient Protection and Affordable Care Act (H.R. 3590), drafted by the U.S. Senate as an alternative to the House bill, and passed by both houses of Congress during 2009 and 2010
- American Health Care Act
- Health and Care Bill 2021 proposed by the British government.
