= National Health Service (Wales) Act 2006 =

Act of the Parliament of the United Kingdom

National Health Service (Wales) Act 2006 (Note: Section 209(1).)
- Act of Parliament
- Parliament of the United Kingdom
- Long title: An Act to consolidate certain enactments relating to the health service.
- Citation: 2006 c. 42
- Territorial extent: England and Wales (Note: Section 209(2.)

Dates
- Royal assent: 8 November 2006
- Commencement: 1 March 2007, subject to section 208 (Note: Section 208.)
Other legislation
| Amended by | Mental Health Act 2007; Local Government and Public Involvement in Health Act 2007; Legal Services Act 2007; Pharmacists and Pharmacy Technicians Order 2007; European Qualifications (Health and Social Care Professions) Regulations 2007; Health and Social Care Act 2008; Housing and Regeneration Act 2008 (Consequential Provisions) Order 2008; Health Act 2009; Companies Act 2006 (Consequential Amendments, Transitional Provisions and Savings) Order 2009; Children and Families (Wales) Measure 2010; Transfer of Tribunal Functions Order 2010; Pharmacy Order 2010; Housing and Regeneration Act 2008 (Consequential Provisions) Order 2010; National Health Service (Reimbursement of the Cost of EEA Treatment) Regulations 2010; Local Education Authorities and Children's Services Authorities (Integration of Functions) Order 2010; Charities Act 2011; Health and Social Care Act 2012; Protection of Freedoms Act 2012; School Standards and Organisation (Wales) Act 2013; Crime and Courts Act 2013; National Health Service (Cross-Border Healthcare) Regulations 2013; National Health Service Finance (Wales) Act 2014; Local Audit and Accountability Act 2014; Social Services and Well-being (Wales) Act 2014; Well-being of Future Generations (Wales) Act 2015; Care Act 2014 and Children and Families Act 2014 (Consequential Amendments) Order 2015; Nurse Staffing Levels (Wales) Act 2016; NHS (Charitable Trusts Etc) Act 2016; Immigration Act 2016; Social Services and Well-being (Wales) Act 2014 (Consequential Amendments) Regulations 2016; Public Health (Wales) Act 2017; Children and Social Work Act 2017; Health Service Medical Supplies (Costs) Act 2017; Additional Learning Needs and Education Tribunal (Wales) Act 2018; Data Protection Act 2018; Public Services Ombudsman (Wales) Act 2019; European Qualifications (Health and Social Care Professions) (Amendment etc.) (EU Exit) Regulations 2019; Social Security Coordination (Reciprocal Healthcare) (Amendment etc.) (EU Exit) Regulations 2019; National Health Service (Cross-Border Healthcare and Miscellaneous Amendments etc.) (EU Exit) Regulations 2019; Health and Social Care (Quality and Engagement) (Wales) Act 2020; National Health Service (Indemnities) (Wales) Act 2020; Sentencing Act 2020; Curriculum and Assessment (Wales) Act 2021; Health and Care Act 2022; Criminal Justice Act 2003 (Commencement No. 33) and Sentencing Act 2020 (Commencement No. 2) Regulations 2022; Health and Social Care Act (Northern Ireland) 2022 (Consequential Amendments) Order 2022; Health and Social Care Information Centre (Transfer of Functions, Abolition and Transitional Provisions) Regulations 2023; Judicial Review and Courts Act 2022 (Magistrates' Court Sentencing Powers) Regulations 2023; Health Service Procurement (Wales) Act 2024; Health and Social Care (Wales) Act 2025; Planning (Consequential Provisions) (Wales) Act 2026 |
| Relates to | National Health Service Act 2006; National Health Service (Consequential Provisions) Act 2006; NHS Redress Act 2006 |

Status: Amended

History of passage through Parliament

Text of statute as originally enacted

Revised text of statute as amended

The National Health Service (Wales) Act 2006 (c. 42), sometimes known as the NHS (Wales) Act 2006 is an act of the Parliament of the United Kingdom relating to NHS Wales.

The enactments consolidated by the act were repealed by section 6 of, and schedule 4 to, the National Health Service (Consequential Provisions) Act 2006.

== Provisions ==
It consolidates legislation relating to the National Health Service as it relates to Wales.

The act devolved certain powers relating to health policy to the National Assembly for Wales.

The act establishes local health boards and NHS trusts. The act establishes mechanisms for improving the delivery of healthcare. The act places certain requirements on local health boards to consult on closures of GP surgeries. The Welsh Government can place local health boards into special measures under the act. The act requires equitable, prompt and effective health service delivery. The act requires that the healthcare be free at the point of delivery.

== Amendments ==
=== National Health Service Finance (Wales) Act 2014 ===
National Health Service Finance (Wales) Act 2014
- Act of the National Assembly for Wales
- National Assembly for Wales
- Long title: An Act of the National Assembly for Wales to make provision in relation to the financial duties of Local Health Boards.
- Citation: 2014 anaw 2
- Introduced by: Mark Drakeford AM, Minister for Health and Social Services

Dates
- Royal assent: 27 January 2014

Status: Current legislation

History of passage through the Assembly

Text of the National Health Service Finance (Wales) Act 2014 as in force today (including any amendments) within the United Kingdom, from legislation.gov.uk.

The 2006 act was amended by the National Health Service Finance (Wales) Act 2014 to require that each local health board ensure that its expenditure does not exceed its funding applied over a period of rolling window of three years beginning with each rather than just applying to each financial year.

=== National Health Service (Indemnities) (Wales) Act 2020 ===
National Health Service (Indemnities) (Wales) Act 2020
- Act of the National Assembly for Wales
- National Assembly for Wales
- Long title: An Act of the National Assembly for Wales to amend the National Health Service (Wales) Act 2006 to make provision about indemnities in respect of expenses and liabilities arising in connection with the provision of health services.
- Citation: 2014 anaw 2
- Introduced by: Vaughan Gething AM, Minister for Health and Social Services.

Dates
- Royal assent: 26 February 2020

Status: Current legislation

History of passage through the Assembly

Text of the National Health Service (Indemnities) (Wales) Act 2020 as in force today (including any amendments) within the United Kingdom, from legislation.gov.uk.

The 2006 act was amended by the National Health Service (Indemnities) (Wales) Act 2020 to establish an indemnity scheme for GPs. The indemnity scheme had first started in April 2019.

=== Health Service Procurement (Wales) Act 2024 ===
Health Service Procurement (Wales) Act 2024 (Note: Section 5.)
- Act of Senedd Cymru
- Senedd Cymru
- Long title: An Act of Senedd Cymru in relation to the procurement of health services in Wales.
- Citation: 2024 asc 1
- Introduced by: Eluned Morgan MS, Minister for Health and Social Services
- Territorial extent: Wales

Dates
- Royal assent: 27 January 2014
- Commencement: 28 January 2014 (Note: Section 4.)
Other legislation
| Amends | National Health Service (Wales) Act 2006; Procurement Act 2023 |

Status: Current legislation

History of passage through the Senedd

Text of statute as originally enacted

Revised text of statute as amended

The act was amended by the Health Service Procurement (Wales) Act 2024 (asc 1) to establish a new procurement regime for health services in Wales. The act allows Wales to be aligned to a new procurement model in England. Plaid Cymru criticised the legislation as "creeping privatisation".
