= Health Service Commissioners Act 1993 =

Act of the Parliament of the United Kingdom

Health Service Commissioners Act 1993 (Note: Section 22(1).)
- Act of Parliament
- Parliament of the United Kingdom
- Long title: An Act to consolidate the enactments relating to the Health Service Commissioners for England, for Wales and for Scotland with amendments to give effect to recommendations of the Law Commission and the Scottish Law Commission.
- Citation: 1993 c. 46
- Introduced by: Lord Mackay
- Territorial extent: England and Wales; Scotland; Northern Ireland (in part); (Note: Section 22(2)–(3).)

Dates
- Royal assent: 5 November 1993
- Commencement: 5 February 1993 (Note: Section 22(4).)

Other legislation
- Amends: See § Repealed enactments
- Repeals/revokes: See § Repealed enactments
- Amended by: Transfer of Functions (Treasury and Minister for the Civil Service) Order 1995; Health Authorities Act 1995; Health Service Commissioners (Amendment) Act 1996; National Health Service (Primary Care) Act 1997; Scotland Act 1998 (Consequential Modifications) (No.2) Order 1999; Health Act 1999; Government Resources and Accounts Act 2000; Health Service Commissioners (Amendment) Act 2000; Freedom of Information Act 2000; Adults with Incapacity (Scotland) Act 2000; National Health Service (Local Pharmaceutical Services Etc.) Regulations 2002; Scottish Public Services Ombudsman Act 2002; National Health Service Reform and Health Care Professions Act 2002; Health and Social Care (Community Health and Standards) Act 2003; Scottish Public Services Ombudsman Act 2002 (Consequential Provisions and Modifications) Order 2004; Regulatory Reform (Local Commissioner for Wales) Order 2004; Public Audit (Wales) Act 2004; Housing Act 2004; Public Services Ombudsman (Wales) Act 2005; Employment Equality (Age) Regulations 2006; National Health Service (Pre-consolidation Amendments) Order 2006; Health Act 2006; National Health Service (Consequential Provisions) Act 2006; NHS Redress Act 2006; Regulatory Reform (Collaboration etc. between Ombudsmen) Order 2007; Local Government and Public Involvement in Health Act 2007; Health Act 2009; Health and Social Care Act 2012; Health Service Commissioner for England (Special Health Authorities) Order 2012; Health Service Commissioner for England (Complaint Handling) Act 2015; Data Protection Act 2018; Public Services Ombudsman (Wales) Act 2019; Health and Care Act 2022; National Security Act 2023 (Consequential Amendments of Primary Legislation) Regulations 2023; Data (Use and Access) Act 2025 (Consequential Amendments and Transitional Provision) Regulations 2026

Status: Amended

Text of statute as originally enacted

Revised text of statute as amended

Text of the Health Service Commissioners Act 1993 as in force today (including any amendments) within the United Kingdom, from legislation.gov.uk.

The Health Service Commissioners Act 1993 (c. 46) is an act of the Parliament of the United Kingdom.

The act consolidated previous legislation governing the posts of Health Service Commissioner for England, Scotland and Wales.

The three posts were formerly held by a single individual who also served as Parliamentary Commissioner for Administration. However, in 2002, the post of Health Service Commissioner for Scotland was abolished and in 2003, the post of Health Service Commissioner for Wales was transferred to a separate office holder in accordance with devolution. The Health Service Commissioner for England still retains the post of Parliamentary Commissioner for Administration and is more commonly called the Parliamentary and Health Service Ombudsman.

The ombudsman may investigate health authorities, National Health Service trusts managing hospitals or other facilities, Primary Care Trusts, individuals undertaking medical or dental services, individuals and bodies providing ophthalmic or pharmaceutical services and individuals or bodies providing services under arrangements with the National Health Service.

== Provisions ==
Under section 3(1), the ombudsman may investigate complaints by or on behalf of any person that he has sustained injustice in consequence of the failure of or in consequence of:

- an alleged failure in a service provided by a health service body.
- an alleged failure of such a body to provide a service which it was a function of the body to provide.
- maladministration connected with any other action taken by or on behalf of such a body.
- action taken by a family health service provider who has undertaken to provide any family health services in connection with these services.
- an alleged failure in the service provided by an independent provider, an alleged failure by an independent provider to provide a service, or maladministration connected with any other action taken by an independent provider in relation to the service.

Under ss3(4)-(7), the Ombudsman may not question the merits of a decision taken without maladministration in the exercise of discretion except when the decision was taken in consequence of the exercise of clinical judgment.

Section 14(1) required that when the Ombudsman conducts an investigation, he must send a report to the interested parties, including the complainant and the body complained about.

If it appears to the ombudsman that the person aggrieved has sustained injustice or hardship in consequence of the action of the body complained about, and the injustice or hardship has not or will not be remedied, he may lay a copy of the report before Parliament under s14(3).

The ombudsman must lay an annual report before Parliament and may lay other reports from time to time as he sees fit under s14(4).

=== Repealed enactments ===
Section 20(2) of the act repealed 11 enactments, listed in Schedule 3 to the act.

Citation	Short title	Extent of repeal
1974 c. 7	Local Government Act 1974	In section 33(3), the words "under the Act of 1967 or Part V of the Act of 1977 as the case may be".
1974 c. 7	Local Government Act 1974	In section 33(4), the words "or Part V of the Act of 1977".
1975 c. 30	Local Government (Scotland) Act 1975	In section 31(3), the words "under the Act of 1967 or Part VI of the Act of 1978 as the case may be".
1975 c. 30	Local Government (Scotland) Act 1975	In section 31(4), the words "or Part VI of the Act of 1978".
1977 c. 49	National Health Service Act 1977	Sections 106 to 120.
1977 c. 49	National Health Service Act 1977	Section 130(3)(c).
1977 c. 49	National Health Service Act 1977	Schedule 13.
1977 c. 49	National Health Service Act 1977	In Schedule 14, paragraph 17.
1977 c. 49	National Health Service Act 1977	In Schedule 15, paragraphs 60 and 61.
1978 c. 29	National Health Service (Scotland) Act 1978	Sections 90 to 97.
1978 c. 29	National Health Service (Scotland) Act 1978	Schedule 14.
1978 c. 29	National Health Service (Scotland) Act 1978	In Schedule 15, paragraph 12.
1980 c. 53	Health Services Act 1980	In Schedule 1, paragraphs 72 to 74.
1980 c. 53	Health Services Act 1980	In Schedule 2, paragraphs 7, 8 and 9 and sub-paragraphs (a) to (f) of paragraph 11.
1984 c. 36	Mental Health (Scotland) Act 1984	In Schedule 3, paragraph 42.
1987 c. 39	Parliamentary and Health Service Commissioners Act 1987	Section 2(2).
1987 c. 39	Parliamentary and Health Service Commissioners Act 1987	Section 4(3) to (5).
1987 c. 39	Parliamentary and Health Service Commissioners Act 1987	Section 5.
1987 c. 39	Parliamentary and Health Service Commissioners Act 1987	Section 6(2) and (3).
1987 c. 39	Parliamentary and Health Service Commissioners Act 1987	Section 7.
1987 c. 39	Parliamentary and Health Service Commissioners Act 1987	Section 8.
1988 c. 49	Health and Medicines Act 1988	Section 12(4) and (5).
1989 c. 6	Official Secrets Act 1989	In Schedule 1, paragraph 1(h).
1990 c. 19	National Health Service and Community Care Act 1990	In Schedule 9, paragraphs 18(10) and (11) and 19(18).
1993 c. 8	Judicial Pensions and Retirement Act 1993	Part III of Schedule 4.

== Subsequent developments ==
The act was amended by the Health Service Commissioners (Amendment) Act 1996 to allow the commissioner or any officers of the commissioner to disclose anything which was not otherwise able to be disclosed, in the interests of the health and safety of patients, by contacting whoever is considered to be relevant.

The act was amended by the Health Service Commissioners (Amendment) Act 2000 to prevent investigations ending because a doctor had retired.
