= Data Protection Act 2018 =

Act of the Parliament of the United Kingdom

Data Protection Act 2018 (Note: Section 215.)
- Act of Parliament
- Parliament of the United Kingdom
- Long title: An Act to make provision for the regulation of the processing of information relating to individuals; to make provision in connection with the Information Commissioner’s functions under certain regulations relating to information; to make provision for a direct marketing code of practice; and for connected purposes.
- Citation: 2018 c. 12
- Introduced by: Matt Hancock (Commons); Henry Ashton, 4th Baron Ashton of Hyde (Lords)
- Territorial extent: United Kingdom (Note: Section 214.)

Dates
- Royal assent: 23 May 2018
- Commencement: Fully in force as of 2 December 2019 (Note: Section 212.)
Other legislation
Amends	Registration Service Act 1953; Dentists Act 1984; Opticians Act 1989; Human Fertilisation and Embryology Act 1990; Health Service Commissioners Act 1993; Immigration and Asylum Act 1999; Terrorism Act 2000; Political Parties, Elections and Referendums Act 2000; Anti-terrorism, Crime and Security Act 2001; Scottish Public Services Ombudsman Act 2002; Domestic Violence, Crime and Victims Act 2004; Public Audit (Wales) Act 2004; Constitutional Reform Act 2005; Mental Capacity Act 2005; National Health Service Act 2006; National Health Service (Wales) Act 2006; Criminal Justice and Immigration Act 2008; Counter-Terrorism Act 2008; Borders, Citizenship and Immigration Act 2009; Terrorist Asset-Freezing etc. Act 2010; Charities Act 2011; Protection of Freedoms Act 2012; Modern Slavery Act 2015; Counter-Terrorism and Security Act 2015; Investigatory Powers Act 2016; Policing and Crime Act 2017; Children and Social Work Act 2017; Digital Economy Act 2017
Repeals/revokes	Data Protection Act 1998
Amended by	European Parliamentary Elections Etc. (Repeal, Revocation, Amendment and Saving Provisions) (United Kingdom and Gibraltar) (EU Exit) Regulations 2018; Public Services Ombudsman (Wales) Act 2019; Consumer Protection (Enforcement) (Amendment etc.) (EU Exit) Regulations 2019; Data Protection, Privacy and Electronic Communications (Amendments etc) (EU Exit) Regulations 2019; UK Statistics (Amendment etc.) (EU Exit) Regulations 2019; Financial Services and Markets Act 2000 (Prospectus) Regulations 2019 (revoked); Sentencing Act 2020; Data Protection, Privacy and Electronic Communications (Amendments etc) (EU Exit) Regulations 2020; Armed Forces Act 2021; UK Statistics (Amendment etc.) (EU Exit) Regulations 2021; Age of Criminal Responsibility (Scotland) Act 2019 (Consequential Provisions and Modifications) Order 2021; Advanced Research and Invention Agency Act 2022; Adoption and Children Act (Northern Ireland) 2022; Health and Care Act 2022; Data Protection Act 2018 (Amendment of Schedule 2 Exemptions) Regulations 2022; Health and Social Care Act (Northern Ireland) 2022 (Consequential Amendments) Order 2022; Northern Ireland Troubles (Legacy and Reconciliation) Act 2023; Veterans Advisory and Pensions Committees Act 2023; Levelling-up and Regeneration Act 2023; Health and Social Care Information Centre (Transfer of Functions, Abolition and Transitional Provisions) Regulations 2023; Data Protection Act 2018 (Transitional Provision) Regulations 2023; Data Protection (Fundamental Rights and Freedoms) (Amendment) Regulations 2023; Retained EU Law (Revocation and Reform) Act 2023 (Consequential Amendment) Regulations 2023; Victims and Prisoners Act 2024; Data Protection Act 2018 (Amendment of Schedule 2 Exemptions) Regulations 2024; Anaesthesia Associates and Physician Associates Order 2024; Data (Use and Access) Act 2025; Border Security, Asylum and Immigration Act 2025; Employment Rights Act 2025; Disclosure (Scotland) Act 2020 (Consequential Provisions and Modifications) Order 2025; Data (Use and Access) Act 2025 (Consequential and Other Amendments) Regulations 2025; Data (Use and Access) Act 2025 (Commencement No. 6 and Transitional and Saving Provisions) Regulations 2026; Data (Use and Access) Act 2025 (Consequential Amendments and Transitional Provision) Regulations 2026
Relates to	General Data Protection Regulation; Data Protection Act 1998

Status: Amended

History of passage through Parliament

Text of statute as originally enacted

Revised text of statute as amended

The Data Protection Act 2018 (c. 12) is an act of the Parliament of the United Kingdom which updates data protection laws in the UK. It is a national law which complements the European Union's General Data Protection Regulation (GDPR) and replaces the Data Protection Act 1998.

The act was to be significantly amended by the Data Protection and Digital Information Bill. That bill was abandoned due to the 2024 United Kingdom general election, but the phased implementation of the Data (Use and Access) Act 2025 will make changes to the operation of the 2018 Act.

== Background ==
The Data Protection Bill was introduced to the House of Lords by Lord Ashton of Hyde, Parliamentary Under-Secretary of State at the Department for Digital, Culture, Media and Sport on 13 September 2017.

The Data Protection Act 2018 received royal assent on 23 May 2018. The Act came into effect on 25 May 2018. It was amended on 1 January 2021 by regulations under the European Union (Withdrawal) Act 2018, to reflect the UK's status outside the EU. It replaces the Data Protection Act 1998.

The Act applies the data protection standards set out in the GDPR and, where the GDPR allows EU member states to make different choices for its implementation in their country, defines those choices for the UK.

== Contents ==
The act has seven parts. These are outlined in Section 1:

1. This act makes provision about the processing of personal data.
2. Most processing of personal data is subject to GDPR.
3. Part 2 supplements the GDPR (see Chapter 2) and applies a broadly equivalent regime to certain types of processing to which the GDPR does not apply (see chapter 3).
4. Part 3 makes provision about the processing of personal data by competent authorities for law enforcement purposes and implements the Law Enforcement Directive.
5. Part 4 makes provision about the processing of personal data by the intelligence services.
6. Part 5 makes provision about the Information Commissioner.
7. Part 6 makes provision about the enforcement of the data protection legislation.
8. Part 7 makes supplementary provision, including provision about the application of this act to the Crown and to Parliament.

The act introduces new offences that include knowingly or recklessly obtaining or disclosing personal data without the consent-giving of the data controller, procuring such disclosure, or retaining the data obtained without consent. Selling, or offering to sell, personal data knowingly or recklessly obtained or disclosed would also be an offence.

Essentially, the act implements the EU Law Enforcement Directive, it implements those parts of the GDPR which "are to be determined by Member State law" and it creates a framework similar to the GDPR for the processing of personal data which is outside the scope of the GDPR. This includes intelligence services processing, immigration services processing and the processing of personal data held in unstructured form by public authorities.

Under section 3 of the European Union (Withdrawal) Act 2018, the GDPR will be incorporated directly into domestic law immediately after the UK exits the European Union.

The enforcement of the act by the Information Commissioner's Office is supported by a data protection charge on UK data controllers under the Data Protection (Charges and Information) Regulations 2018. Exemptions from the charge were left broadly the same as for 1998 act: largely some businesses and non-profits internal core purposes (staff or members, marketing and accounting), household affairs, some public purposes, and non-automated processing. Under the 2018 act, the enforcement regime for registration changed from criminal to civil monetary penalties.

The act introduces a new public interest test applicable to the research processing of personal health data.

The act gave people the right to apply to courts and tribunals for different orders, including: in the tribunal by ordering the Information Commissioner to conduct an investigation (section 166); in the court for compliance orders against the Commissioner or controllers or processors (section 167); in the tribunal against penalty notices and other enforcement decisions (section 162). The jurisdiction of these sections and their extent and limits have been the subject of a campaign of litigation arguing their different extent and limits, including as high as the Court of Appeal.

== Additions ==
The Data Protection Act 2018 is a revision of the Data Protection Act 1998 which includes the importance of organizations to be more responsible with the information as well as improving the confidentiality. The latter revision also works in tandem with the GDPR, which the Data Protection Act 1998 did not do.

From the Data Protection Act 1998 to the Data Protection Act 2018, the key additions are the following:

- the right to erasure
- inclusions of exemptions of the Data Protection Act
- being regulated in tandem with the GDPR

The revision allowed the law makers to add the ability to erase any data if the individual chooses to and this is based on the premise of the basic right to privacy.

The 2018 version allowed people to get a clear interpretation of the exemptions of the act, which was unclear in the 1998 version.

When the Data Protection Act 1998 was being made, the GDPR did not exist, thus there was no law for the DPA to work with. Eventually, with the creation of the GDPR, the DPA was updated to work in tandem.
