= List of acts of the Parliament of the United Kingdom from 2017 =

This is a list of acts of the Parliament of the United Kingdom passed in 2017.

Acts passed since 1963 are cited by calendar year, as opposed to the convention used for earlier acts of citing the regnal year(s) in which the relevant parliamentary session was held. Each act passed in a respective year is given a chapter number (abbreviated "c."), denoted by Arabic numerals in the case of public general acts, lowercase Roman numerals in the case of local acts, or italicised Arabic numerals in the case of personal acts. These run as separate series.

37 acts of Parliament were passed in 2017: 35 public general acts and 2 local acts.

indicates that an act has been transcribed on Wikisource, indicates that an act is available to view at legislation.gov.uk, and indicates the location of the original act in the Parliamentary Archives.

== Public general acts ==
Short title	Citation	Royal assent
Long title
Small Charitable Donations and Childcare Payments Act 2017	2017 c. 1	16 January 2017
An Act to make provision about the payment schemes established by the Small Charitable Donations Act 2012 (Note: Small Charitable Donations Act 2012 (c. 23)) and the Childcare Payments Act 2014. (Note: Childcare Payments Act 2014 (c. 28))
Savings (Government Contributions) Act 2017	2017 c. 2	16 January 2017
An Act to make provision for, and in connection with, government bonuses in respect of additions to savings accounts and other investment plans.
Policing and Crime Act 2017	2017 c. 3	31 January 2017
An Act to make provision for collaboration between the emergency services; to make provision about the handling of police complaints and other matters relating to police conduct and to make further provision about the Independent Police Complaints Commission; to make provision for super-complaints about policing; to make provision for the investigation of concerns about policing raised by whistle-blowers; to make provision about police discipline; to make provision about police inspection; to make provision about the powers of police civilian staff and police volunteers; to remove the powers of the police to appoint traffic wardens; to enable provision to be made to alter police ranks; to make provision about the Police Federation; to make provision in connection with the replacement of the Association of Chief Police Officers with the National Police Chiefs' Council; to make provision about the system for bail after arrest but before charge; to make provision about the retention of biometric material; to make provision to enable greater use of modern technology at police stations; to make other amendments to the Police and Criminal Evidence Act 1984; (Note: Police and Criminal Evidence Act 1984 (c. 60)) to amend the powers of the police under the Mental Health Act 1983; (Note: Mental Health Act 1983 (c. 20)) to extend the powers of the police in relation to maritime enforcement; to make provision for cross-border enforcement; to make provision about the powers of the police to require removal of disguises; to make provision about deputy police and crime commissioners and the Deputy Mayor for Policing and Crime; to make provision to enable changes to the names of police areas; to make provision about the regulation of firearms and pyrotechnic articles; to make provision about the licensing of alcohol; to make provision about the implementation and enforcement of financial sanctions; to amend the Police Act 1996 (Note: Police Act 1996 (c. 16)) to make further provision about police collaboration; to make provision about the powers of the National Crime Agency; to make provision for requiring arrested persons to provide details of nationality; to make provision for requiring defendants in criminal proceedings to provide details of nationality and other information; to make provision about the seizure etc of invalid travel documents; to make provision for pardons for convictions etc for certain abolished offences; to make provision to protect the anonymity of victims of forced marriage; to increase the maximum sentences of imprisonment for certain offences of putting people in fear of violence etc; to make provision to combat the sexual exploitation of children and to protect children and vulnerable adults from harm; to make provision about coroners' duties in respect of deaths in state detention; to make provision about the powers of litter authorities in Scotland; and for connected purposes.
Wales Act 2017	2017 c. 4	31 January 2017
An Act to amend the Government of Wales Act 2006 (Note: Government of Wales Act 2006 (c. 32)) and the Wales Act 2014 (Note: Wales Act 2014 (c. 29)) and to make provision about the functions of the Welsh Ministers and about Welsh tribunals; and for connected purposes.
Commonwealth Development Corporation Act 2017	2017 c. 5	23 February 2017
An Act to amend the amount of the limit in section 15 of the Commonwealth Development Corporation Act 1999 (Note: Commonwealth Development Corporation Act 1999 (c. 20)) on the government's financial assistance.
Cultural Property (Armed Conflicts) Act 2017	2017 c. 6	23 February 2017
An Act to enable the United Kingdom to implement the Hague Convention for the Protection of Cultural Property in the Event of Armed Conflict of 1954 and the Protocols to that Convention of 1954 and 1999.
High Speed Rail (London - West Midlands) Act 2017	2017 c. 7	23 February 2017
An Act to make provision for a railway between Euston in London and a junction with the West Coast Main Line at Handsacre in Staffordshire, with a spur from Water Orton in Warwickshire to Curzon Street in Birmingham; and for connected purposes.
Supply and Appropriation (Anticipation and Adjustments) Act 2017	2017 c. 8	16 March 2017
An Act to authorise the use of resources for the years ending with 31 March 2015, 31 March 2016, 31 March 2017 and 31 March 2018; to authorise the issue of sums out of the Consolidated Fund for the years ending 31 March 2017 and 31 March 2018; and to appropriate the supply authorised by this Act for the years ending with 31 March 2015, 31 March 2016 and 31 March 2017.
European Union (Notification of Withdrawal) Act 2017	2017 c. 9	16 March 2017
An Act to confer power on the Prime Minister to notify, under Article 50(2) of the Treaty on European Union, the United Kingdom's intention to withdraw from the EU.
Finance Act 2017	2017 c. 10	27 April 2017
An Act to grant certain duties, to alter other duties, and to amend the law relating to the national debt and the public revenue, and to make further provision in connection with finance.
Parking Places (Variation of Charges) Act 2017	2017 c. 11	27 April 2017
An Act to make provision in relation to the procedure to be followed by local authorities when varying the charges to be paid in connection with the use of certain parking places.
Broadcasting (Radio Multiplex Services) Act 2017	2017 c. 12	27 April 2017
An Act to make provision about the regulation of small-scale radio multiplex services; and for connected purposes.
Homelessness Reduction Act 2017	2017 c. 13	27 April 2017
An Act to make provision about measures for reducing homelessness; and for connected purposes.
Intellectual Property (Unjustified Threats) Act 2017	2017 c. 14	27 April 2017
An Act to amend the law relating to unjustified threats to bring proceedings for infringement of patents, registered trade marks, rights in registered designs, design right or Community designs.
National Citizen Service Act 2017	2017 c. 15	27 April 2017
An Act to make provision about the National Citizen Service Trust.
Children and Social Work Act 2017	2017 c. 16	27 April 2017
An Act to make provision about looked after children; to make other provision in relation to the welfare of children; and to make provision about the regulation of social workers.
Pension Schemes Act 2017	2017 c. 17	27 April 2017
An Act to make provision about pension schemes.
Preventing and Combating Violence Against Women and Domestic Violence (Ratification of Convention) Act 2017	2017 c. 18	27 April 2017
An Act to make provision in connection with the ratification by the United Kingdom of the Council of Europe Convention on preventing and combating violence against women and domestic violence (the Istanbul Convention).
Technical and Further Education Act 2017	2017 c. 19	27 April 2017
An Act to make provision about technical and further education.
Neighbourhood Planning Act 2017	2017 c. 20	27 April 2017
An Act to make provision about planning and compulsory purchase; and for connected purposes.
Bus Services Act 2017	2017 c. 21	27 April 2017
An Act to make provision about bus services; and for connected purposes.
Criminal Finances Act 2017	2017 c. 22	27 April 2017
An Act to amend the Proceeds of Crime Act 2002; (Note: Proceeds of Crime Act 2002 (c. 29)) make provision in connection with terrorist property; create corporate offences for cases where a person associated with a body corporate or partnership facilitates the commission by another person of a tax evasion offence; and for connected purposes.
Health Service Medical Supplies (Costs) Act 2017	2017 c. 23	27 April 2017
An Act to make provision in connection with controlling the cost of health service medicines and other medical supplies; to make provision in connection with the provision of pricing and other information by those manufacturing, distributing or supplying those medicines and supplies, and other related products, and the disclosure of that information; and for connected purposes.
Northern Ireland (Ministerial Appointments and Regional Rates) Act 2017	2017 c. 24	27 April 2017
An Act to extend the period of time for making Ministerial appointments following the election of the Northern Ireland Assembly on 2 March 2017, and to make provision about the regional rate in Northern Ireland for the year ending 31 March 2018.
Local Audit (Public Access to Documents) Act 2017	2017 c. 25	27 April 2017
An Act to extend public access to certain local audit documents under section 26 of the Local Audit and Accountability Act 2014. (Note: Local Audit and Accountability Act 2014 (c. 2))
Merchant Shipping (Homosexual Conduct) Act 2017	2017 c. 26	27 April 2017
An Act to repeal sections 146(4) and 147(3) of the Criminal Justice and Public Order Act 1994. (Note: Criminal Justice and Public Order Act 1994 (c. 33))
Guardianship (Missing Persons) Act 2017	2017 c. 27	27 April 2017
An Act to make provision about the property and affairs of missing persons; and for connected purposes.
Farriers (Registration) Act 2017	2017 c. 28	27 April 2017
An Act to make provision about the constitution of the Farriers Registration Council and its committees.
Higher Education and Research Act 2017	2017 c. 29	27 April 2017
An Act to make provision about higher education and research; and to make provision about alternative payments to students in higher or further education.
Digital Economy Act 2017	2017 c. 30	27 April 2017
An Act to make provision about electronic communications infrastructure and services; to provide for restricting access to online pornography; to make provision about protection of intellectual property in connection with electronic communications; to make provision about data-sharing; to make provision in connection with section 68 of the Telecommunications Act 1984; (Note: Telecommunications Act 1984 (c. 12)) to make provision about functions of OFCOM in relation to the BBC; to provide for determination by the BBC of age-related TV licence fee concessions; to make provision about the regulation of direct marketing; to make other provision about OFCOM and its functions; to make provision about internet filters; to make provision about preventing or restricting the use of communication devices in connection with drug dealing offences; to confer power to create an offence of breaching limits on ticket sales; to make provision about the payment of charges to the Information Commissioner; to make provision about payment systems and securities settlement systems; to make provision about qualifications in information technology; and for connected purposes.
Supply and Appropriation (Main Estimates) Act 2017	2017 c. 31	19 July 2017
An Act to authorise the use of resources for the year ending with 31 March 2018; to authorise both the issue of sums out of the Consolidated Fund and the application of income for that year; and to appropriate the supply authorised for that year by this Act and by the Supply and Appropriation (Anticipation and Adjustments) Act 2017. (Note: Supply and Appropriation (Anticipation and Adjustments) Act 2017 (c. 8))
Finance (No. 2) Act 2017	2017 c. 32	16 November 2017
An Act to grant certain duties, to alter other duties, and to amend the law relating to the national debt and the public revenue, and to make further provision in connection with finance.
Air Travel Organisers' Licensing Act 2017	2017 c. 33	16 November 2017
An Act to amend sections 71, 71A and 84 of the Civil Aviation Act 1982, (Note: Civil Aviation Act 1982 c. 16) and for connected purposes.
Northern Ireland Budget Act 2017 (repealed)	2017 c. 34	16 November 2017
An Act to authorise the issue out of the Consolidated Fund of Northern Ireland of certain sums for the service of the year ending 31 March 2018; to appropriate those sums for specified purposes; to authorise the Department of Finance in Northern Ireland to borrow on the credit of the appropriated sums; to authorise the use for the public service of certain resources (including accruing resources) for the year ending 31 March 2018; and to repeal certain spent provisions. (Repealed by Budget (No. 3) Act (Northern Ireland) 2020 (c. 6 (N.I.)))
European Union (Approvals) Act 2017 (repealed)	2017 c. 35	7 December 2017
An Act to make provision approving for the purposes of section 8 of the European Union Act 2011 (Note: European Union Act 2011 (c. 12)) draft decisions under Article 352 of the Treaty on the Functioning of the European Union on the participation of the Republic of Albania and the Republic of Serbia in the work of the European Union Agency for Fundamental Rights and on the signing and conclusion of an agreement between the European Union and Canada regarding the application of their competition laws. (Repealed by European Union (Withdrawal) Act 2018 (Consequential Amendments) Regulations 2018 (SI 2018/1242))

== Local acts ==
Short title	Citation	Royal assent
Long title
Faversham Oyster Fishery Company Act 2017	2017 c. i	27 April 2017
An Act to provide for the alteration of the objects, powers and constitution of the Faversham Oyster Fishery Company; and for other purposes.
New Southgate Cemetery Act 2017	2017 c. ii	16 November 2017
An Act to confer powers upon New Southgate Cemetery and Crematorium Limited and the National Spiritual Assembly of the Baháʼís of the United Kingdom to extinguish rights of burial and disturb human remains in New Southgate Cemetery for the purpose of increasing the space for interments; and for connected purposes.

== See also ==
- List of acts of the Parliament of the United Kingdom
