= National Health Service Act 2006 =

Act of the Parliament of the United Kingdom

National Health Service Act 2006 (Note: Section 278(1).)
- Act of Parliament
- Parliament of the United Kingdom
- Long title: An Act to consolidate certain enactments relating to the health service.
- Citation: 2006 c. 41
- Territorial extent: England and Wales; Scotland (sections 261–266); Northern Ireland (sections 261–266); (Note: Section 277(2)–(3).)

Dates
- Royal assent: 8 November 2006
- Commencement: 1 March 2007, subject to section 277 (Note: Section 277.)
Other legislation
Amended by	Mental Health Act 2007; Tribunals, Courts and Enforcement Act 2007; Local Government and Public Involvement in Health Act 2007; Legal Services Act 2007; Pharmacists and Pharmacy Technicians Order 2007; European Qualifications (Health and Social Care Professions) Regulations 2007; Health and Social Care Act 2008; Government Resources and Accounts Act 2000 (Audit of Public Bodies) Order 2008; Housing and Regeneration Act 2008 (Consequential Provisions) Order 2008; Local Democracy, Economic Development and Construction Act 2009; Health Act 2009; Companies Act 2006 (Consequential Amendments, Transitional Provisions and Savings) Order 2009; Transfer of Tribunal Functions Order 2010; Pharmacy Order 2010; Housing and Regeneration Act 2008 (Consequential Provisions) Order 2010; National Health Service (Reimbursement of the Cost of EEA Treatment) Regulations 2010; Local Education Authorities and Children's Services Authorities (Integration of Functions) Order 2010; Localism Act 2011; Charities Act 2011; Health and Social Care Act 2012; Protection of Freedoms Act 2012; Finance Act 2012; Tribunals, Courts and Enforcement Act 2007 (Consequential Amendments) Order 2012; Crime and Courts Act 2013; Energy Act 2013; National Health Service (Direct Payments) (Repeal of Pilot Schemes Limitation) Order 2013; National Health Service (Cross-Border Healthcare) Regulations 2013; Health and Social Care Act 2012 (Consequential Amendments) (No. 2) Order 2013; Local Audit and Accountability Act 2014; Care Act 2014; Legislative Reform (Clinical Commissioning Groups) Order 2014; Deregulation Act 2015; Care Act 2014 and Children and Families Act 2014 (Consequential Amendments) Order 2015; Cities and Local Government Devolution Act 2016; NHS (Charitable Trusts Etc) Act 2016; Social Services and Well-being (Wales) Act 2014 (Consequential Amendments) Regulations 2016; Enterprise and Regulatory Reform Act 2013 (Consequential Amendments) (Bankruptcy) and the Small Business, Enterprise and Employment Act 2015 (Consequential Amendments) Regulations 2016; Children and Social Work Act 2017; Health Service Medical Supplies (Costs) Act 2017; Additional Learning Needs and Education Tribunal (Wales) Act 2018; Data Protection Act 2018; European Qualifications (Health and Social Care Professions) (Amendment etc.) (EU Exit) Regulations 2019; Human Medicines (Amendment etc.) (EU Exit) Regulations 2019; Social Security Coordination (Reciprocal Healthcare) (Amendment etc.) (EU Exit) Regulations 2019; National Health Service (Cross-Border Healthcare and Miscellaneous Amendments etc.) (EU Exit) Regulations 2019; Sentencing Act 2020; Curriculum and Assessment (Wales) Act 2021; Medicines and Medical Devices Act 2021; Health and Care Act 2022; Health and Social Care Act (Northern Ireland) 2022 (Consequential Amendments) Order 2022; Levelling-up and Regeneration Act 2023; Health and Social Care Information Centre (Transfer of Functions, Abolition and Transitional Provisions) Regulations 2023; Health Education England (Transfer of Functions, Abolition and Transitional Provisions) Regulations 2023; Planning (Consequential Provisions) (Wales) Act 2026; Rare Cancers Act 2026
Relates to	National Health Service (Wales) Act 2006; National Health Service (Consequential Provisions) Act 2006; NHS Redress Act 2006

Status: Amended

History of passage through Parliament

Text of statute as originally enacted

Revised text of statute as amended

The National Health Service Act 2006 (c. 41) is an act of the Parliament of the United Kingdom. It sets out the structure of the National Health Service in England.

The enactments consolidated by the act were repealed by section 6 of, and schedule 4 to, the National Health Service (Consequential Provisions) Act 2006.

== Provisions ==
The act consolidated the law in relation to the National Health Service in England.

Section 75 of the act allows for formal partnerships agreements integrate commissioning, pool budgets or set up joint teams across different councils and the NHS.

The act placed various obligations on primary care trusts, including:

- to ensure that its expenditure in any year is not higher than the allotment from the Secretary of State relating to that year
- to ensure that its use of resources is not higher than as specified by the Secretary of State
- to keep proper records including accounts
- to publish annual accounts

The act also gave PCTs the power to provide hospital services for private patients and to provide services for the purpose of making additional income.

The act contained an obligation to engage the public and patients.

== Subsequent developments ==
It was significantly amended by the Health and Social Care Act 2012.

== See also ==
- British enterprise law
- National Health Service (England), the national healthcare system overhauled by the bill.
- National Health Service and Community Care Act 1990 (c 19)
- National Health Service (Private Finance) Act 1997 (c 56) section 1, on private finance
- NHS Redress Act 2006
