= Curriculum and Assessment (Wales) Act 2021 =

Act of Senedd Cymru

Curriculum and Assessment (Wales) Act 2021 (Note: Section 85.)
- Act of Senedd Cymru
- Senedd Cymru
- Long title: An Act of Senedd Cymru to establish a new framework for a curriculum for pupils of compulsory school age at maintained schools and pupil referral units, for children of compulsory school age for whom education is otherwise arranged by local authorities, for pupils at maintained nursery schools and for certain other children for whom nursery education is provided; to make provision about progression and assessment in connection with a curriculum for those pupils and children; to make provision about a curriculum for pupils above compulsory school age at maintained schools; and for connected purposes.
- Citation: 2021 asc 4
- Introduced by: Kirsty Williams
- Territorial extent: Wales

Dates
- Royal assent: 29 April 2021
- Commencement: various (Note: Section 84.)

Other legislation
- Amends: Education Act 1996; National Health Service Act 2006; National Health Service (Wales) Act 2006
- Amended by: Welsh Language and Education (Wales) Act 2025

Status: Amended

Text of statute as originally enacted

Revised text of statute as amended

Text of the Curriculum and Assessment (Wales) Act 2021 as in force today (including any amendments) within the United Kingdom, from legislation.gov.uk.

The Curriculum and Assessment (Wales) Act 2021 (asc 4) (Welsh: Deddf cwricwlwm ac asesu (Cymru) 2021) is an act of Senedd Cymru for new curriculum requirements for all learners aged 3 to 16 in maintained or funded non-maintained schools and nursery education in Wales.

== Replacing previous curriculum and law ==
- The new curriculum replaced the previous national curriculum and basic curriculum.
- The act primarily replaces Part 7 of the Education Act 2002 which determined the previous curriculum.

== Curriculum changes ==
The act establishes new curriculum requirements for all learners aged 3 to 16 in maintained or funded non-maintained schools, nursery education and other forms of education. The new curriculum is designed to include more emphasis on skills and experiences as well as knowledge. The curriculum groups education into six "Areas of Learning and Experience", with the intention of helping teachers draw links between subjects and teach topics in a broad way, though traditional subjects will still be taught. Within a basic framework of goals and learning areas, it give schools freedom to develop their own curriculum to suit the needs of their pupils. Other changes include a greater emphasis on the history of Wales and ethnic minority groups, which reports by Estyn in previous years suggested had often been poor, along with the removal of parents' right to take their children out of sex education classes.
