= Access to Health Records Act 1990 =

Act of the Parliament of the United Kingdom

Access to Health Records Act 1990 (Note: Section 12(1).)
- Act of Parliament
- Parliament of the United Kingdom
- Long title: An Act to establish a right of access to health records by the individuals to whom they relate and other persons; to provide for the correction of inaccurate health records and for the avoidance of certain contractual obligations; and for connected purposes.
- Citation: 1990 c. 23
- Territorial extent: England and Wales; Scotland; (Note: Section 12(3).)

Dates
- Royal assent: 13 July 1990
- Commencement: 1 November 1991 (Note: Section 12(2).)

Other legislation
- Amended by: National Health Service (Consequential Provisions) Act 2006

Status: Amended

Text of statute as originally enacted

Revised text of statute as amended

Text of the Access to Health Records Act 1990 as in force today (including any amendments) within the United Kingdom, from legislation.gov.uk.

The Access to Health Records Act 1990 (c. 23) is an act of the Parliament of the United Kingdom which applies to people in England, Wales and Scotland.

== Provisions ==
The act enabled individuals to see medical records.

The act gave individuals to see their own records, but also gave rights to access to others limited circumstances.

The right for an individual to access these records could be denied in cases where it is decided that seeing these records would cause them or others harm.

Where a person has a claim arising from the death, access is limited to health records which are necessary for that claim.
