= NHS Redress Act 2006 =

Act of the Parliament of the United Kingdom

NHS Redress Act 2006 (Note: Section 19(1).)
- Act of Parliament
- Parliament of the United Kingdom
- Long title: An Act to make provision about arrangements for redress in relation to liability in tort in connection with services provided as part of the health service in England or Wales; and for connected purposes.
- Citation: 2006 c. 44
- Territorial extent: England and Wales (Note: Section 19(5).)

Dates
- Royal assent: 8 November 2006
- Commencement: 8 November 2006 (sections 18 and 19); rest of act not in force; (Note: Section 19(2)–(4).)
Other legislation
Amends	National Health Service Act 1977; Health Service Commissioners Act 1993; Data Protection Act 1998
Amended by	National Health Service (Consequential Provisions) Act 2006
Relates to	National Health Service Act 2006; National Health Service (Wales) Act 2006; National Health Service (Consequential Provisions) Act 2006

Status: Amended

History of passage through Parliament

Text of statute as originally enacted

Revised text of statute as amended

The NHS Redress Act 2006 (c. 44) is an act of the Parliament of the United Kingdom passed on 8 November 2006.

The policy provides a non-adversarial and quicker alternative to the traditional legal process for resolving clinical negligence claims within the NHS. The policy was enacted to compensate patients who have suffered harm due to clinical negligence within the British healthcare system.

The act contains a maximum limit on financial compensation of £20,000.

This is concerned exclusively with "qualifying liability in tort" and affirms Parliament’s view that fault based liability should remain the basis of compensation for clinical mishaps.

The statute is important legislation since it potentially affects NHS hospital patients; the intention is to extend its operation to primary care. The underlying policy of the act is to provide a genuine alternative to litigation. The act does not affect any private law rights. It is wholly concerned with the process of compensation; it does not alter the basis of compensation. It is procedural, not substantive.

The act proposes a redress package where there has been clinical negligence in hospital. The redress package must include: an offer of compensation, explanation, apology and a report of action to prevent similar occurrences. The redress package may include care or treatment. The package can be accepted with a waiver of the right to sue, or rejected. The redress scheme is to be run by the NHS Litigation Authority.

The proposed redress scheme is a consensual process, not a judicial process; redress is offered not awarded. Proceeding under the redress scheme is voluntary. Proceedings under the redress scheme and civil legal proceedings are mutually exclusive: they cannot be conducted at the same time. Legal rights are suspended but remain intact during the redress process when legal liability is assessed; legal liability is not adjudicated upon by the scheme’s procedure since it does is not a tribunal. Legal rights are only determined if an offer is made and accepted as part of a compromise agreement.

The act is enabling legislation and the detail of its operation will be set out in regulation. However, indications of its likely operation may be gleaned from parliamentary debate and in supporting documentation. For example, there are indications that: (1) the scheme proposes that any offer made will be without prejudice, so that if it is rejected it may not be taken as evidence of liability in any legal proceedings; (2) the upper limit for monetary compensation will be £20,000; (3) legal privilege will not be asserted in respect of the investigation report.

However, the necessary secondary legislation was never enacted in England. In 2010, the Department of Health stated that it considered it more important to reform NHS complaints arrangements rather than focusing on the redress scheme. The act therefore remains framework legislation without operational effect in England. Instead, clinical negligence claims in England are handled through traditional litigation processes managed by NHS Resolution, with patients typically pursuing compensation through conventional legal channels rather than the streamlined redress scheme the act envisioned.
