= Opticians Act 1989 =

Act of the Parliament of the United Kingdom

Opticians Act 1989 (Note: Section 39(1).)
- Act of Parliament
- Parliament of the United Kingdom
- Long title: An Act to consolidate certain enactments relating to opticians with amendments to give effect to recommendations of the Law Commission and the Scottish Law Commission.
- Citation: 1989 c. 44
- Territorial extent: United Kingdom (Note: Section 39(2).)

Dates
- Royal assent: 16 November 1989
- Commencement: 16 February 1990 (Note: Section 38.)
Other legislation
Amended by	Health and Personal Social Services (Northern Ireland) Order 1991; Value Added Tax Act 1994; Health Authorities Act 1995; National Health Service (Primary Care) Act 1997; Civil Partnership Act 2004; Constitutional Reform Act 2005; Opticians Act 1989 (Amendment) Order 2005; General Optical Council (Registration Appeals Rules) Order of Council 2005; Health Act 2006; National Health Service (Consequential Provisions) Act 2006; European Qualifications (Health and Social Care Professions) Regulations 2007; Health Care and Associated Professions (Miscellaneous Amendments) Order 2008; Companies Act 2006 (Consequential Amendments etc) Order 2008; Health and Social Care Act 2012; Co-operative and Community Benefit Societies Act 2014; Health Care and Associated Professions (Indemnity Arrangements) Order 2014; Health and Social Care (Safety and Quality) Act 2015; Social Services and Well-being (Wales) Act 2014 (Consequential Amendments) Regulations 2016; Data Protection Act 2018; Data Protection, Privacy and Electronic Communications (Amendments etc) (EU Exit) Regulations 2019; European Qualifications (Health and Social Care Professions) (Amendment etc.) (EU Exit) Regulations 2019; Health and Social Care Act (Northern Ireland) 2022; Health and Social Care Act (Northern Ireland) 2022 (Consequential Amendments) Order 2022; Recognition of Professional Qualifications and Implementation of International Recognition Agreements (Amendment) Regulations 2023; Recognition of Professional Qualifications and Implementation of International Recognition Agreements (Amendment) (Extension to Switzerland etc.) Regulations 2024

Status: Amended

Text of statute as originally enacted

Revised text of statute as amended

Text of the Opticians Act 1989 as in force today (including any amendments) within the United Kingdom, from legislation.gov.uk.

The Opticians Act 1989 (c. 44) is an act of the Parliament of the United Kingdom that consolidated enactments relating to opticians in the United Kingdom.

== Provisions ==
The act is the main act law regulating optometrists and dispensing opticians.

Originally the act only covered lens to cover lens designed to correct, remedy or relieve a "defect of sight". It was amended to cover all contact lenses, including novelty contact lenses in 2005.

=== Repealed enactments ===
Section 37(4) of the act repealed 9 enactments, listed in schedule 2 to the act.

Enactments repealed by section 37(4)
Citation	Short title	Extent of repeal
6 & 7 Eliz. 2. c. 32	Opticians Act 1958	The whole act.
1975 c. 21	Criminal Procedure (Scotland) Act 1975	In Schedule 7A, paragraphs 11 to 13.
1977 c. 45	Criminal Law Act 1977	In Schedule 1, paragraphs 14 to 16.
1977 c. 49	National Health Service Act 1977	In Schedule 15, paragraphs 19 and 20.
1978 c. 29	National Health Service (Scotland) Act 1978	In Schedule 16, paragraph 11.
1981 c. 54	Supreme Court Act 1981	In Schedule 5, the entry relating to the Opticians Act 1958.
1984 c. 48	Health and Social Security Act 1984	Section 1(1) and (2).
1984 c. 48	Health and Social Security Act 1984	Sections 2 to 4.
1984 c. 48	Health and Social Security Act 1984	In section 26(6), the words "section 1(1) and (2);" and the words "sections 2 to 4 and Schedule 2;".
1984 c. 48	Health and Social Security Act 1984	Schedule 2.
1985 c. 9	Companies Consolidation (Consequential Provisions) Act 1985	In Schedule 2, the entry relating to the Opticians Act 1958.
1988 c. 49	Health and Medicines Act 1988	Section 13(6) and (7).
1988 c. 49	Health and Medicines Act 1988	Section 14.
1988 c. 49	Health and Medicines Act 1988	In section 26(2), the words "section 14".
1988 c. 49	Health and Medicines Act 1988	In section 27(3), the words "13(6) and (7), 14".
