= Children and Young Persons Act 2008 =

Act of the Parliament of the United Kingdom

Children and Young Persons Act 2008 (Note: Section 45.)
- Act of Parliament
- Parliament of the United Kingdom
- Long title: An Act to make provision about the delivery of local authority social work services for children and young persons; to amend Parts 2 and 3 of the Children Act 1989; to make further provision about the functions of local authorities and others in relation to children and young persons; to make provision about the enforcement of care standards in relation to certain establishments or agencies connected with children; to make provision about the independent review of determinations relating to adoption; and for connected purposes.
- Citation: 2008 c. 23
- Introduced by: Ed Balls (Commons); Lord Adonis (Lords)
- Territorial extent: England and Wales; Scotland (paragraph 9 of schedule 1); (Note: Section 43.)

Dates
- Royal assent: 13 November 2008
- Commencement: Various (Note: Section 44.)
Other legislation
Amends	Children Act 1989
Amended by	Local Education Authorities and Children's Services Authorities (Integration of Functions) Order 2010; Legal Aid, Sentencing and Punishment of Offenders Act 2012; Deregulation Act 2015; Social Services and Well-being (Wales) Act 2014 (Consequential Amendments) Regulations 2016; Children and Social Work Act 2017; Sentencing Act 2020

Status: Amended

History of passage through Parliament

Text of statute as originally enacted

Revised text of statute as amended

The Children and Young Persons Act 2008 (c. 23) is an act of the Parliament of the United Kingdom.

== Provisions ==
The act removed the restriction that children's services only make payments to families in "exceptional circumstances" under the Children Act 1989.

The act establishes a requirement for every local authority to have a multi-agency children's trust board.

== Section 44 - Commencement ==
Orders made under this section

- The Children and Young Persons Act 2008 (Commencement No. 1 and Saving Provision) Order 2009 (SI 2009/268 (C.11))
- The Children and Young Persons Act 2008 (Commencement No.2) Order 2009 (SI 2009/3354 (C.154))
- The Children and Young Persons Act 2008 (Commencement No.3, Saving and Transitional Provisions) Order 2010 (SI 2010/2981 (C.131))
- The Children and Young Persons Act 2008 (Commencement No. 1) (England) Order 2009 (SI 2009/323 (C.15))
- The Children and Young Persons Act 2008 (Commencement No.2) (England) Order 2009 (SI 2009/2273 (C.99))
- The Children and Young Persons Act 2008 (Commencement No.3) (England) Order 2010 (SI 2010/2714 (C.126))
- The Children and Young Persons Act 2008 (Commencement No. 1) (Wales) Order 2009 (SI 2009/728 (W.64))
- The Children and Young Persons Act 2008 (Commencement No. 2) (Wales) Order 2009 (SI 2009/1921 (W.175) (C.91))
- The Children and Young Persons Act 2008 (Commencement No.3) (Wales) Order 2010 (SI 2010/749 (W.77) (C.51))
- The Children and Young Persons Act 2008 (Commencement No. 4) (Wales) Order 2010 (SI 2010/1329 (W.112) (C.81))
- The Children and Young Persons Act 2008 (Commencement No. 5) (Wales) Order 2011 (SI 2011/824 (W.123) (C.32))
- The Children and Young Persons Act 2008 (Commencement No. 6) (Wales) Order 2011 (SI 2011/949 (W.135))
