= Health and Social Care (Community Health and Standards) Act 2003 =

Act of the Parliament of the United Kingdom

Health and Social Care (Community Health and Standards) Act 2003 (Note: Section 203.)
- Act of Parliament
- Parliament of the United Kingdom
- Long title: An Act to amend the law about the National Health Service; to make provision about quality and standards in the provision of health and social care, including provision establishing the Commission for Healthcare Audit and Inspection and the Commission for Social Care Inspection; to amend the law about the recovery of NHS costs from persons making compensation payments; to provide for the replacement of the Welfare Food Schemes; to make provision about appointments to health and social care bodies; and for connected purposes.
- Citation: 2003 c. 43
- Territorial extent: England and Wales; Scotland (in part); Northern Ireland (in part); (Note: Section 202.)

Dates
- Royal assent: 20 November 2003
- Commencement: Various (Note: Section 199.)
Other legislation
Amends	Abortion Act 1967; House of Commons Disqualification Act 1975; Public Health (Control of Disease) Act 1984; Dentists Act 1984; Courts and Legal Services Act 1990; Water Industry Act 1991; Health Service Commissioners Act 1993; Value Added Tax Act 1994; Education Act 1996; Health and Social Care Act 2001; Anti-terrorism, Crime and Security Act 2001
Amended by	National Health Service (Consequential Provisions) Act 2006; Safeguarding Vulnerable Groups Act 2006; Mental Health Act 2007; Modern Slavery Act 2015; Sentencing Act 2020

Status: Amended

Text of statute as originally enacted

Revised text of statute as amended

The Health and Social Care (Community Health and Standards) Act 2003 (c. 43) is an act of the Parliament of the United Kingdom that enabled the creation of foundation trusts and made a number of other reforms to healthcare and social care.

== Provisions ==
The act establishes a type of NHS trust known as "foundation trusts" which would be established as public benefit corporations, but this applies to England only.

The act requires Primary Care Trusts in England and Local Health Boards in Wales to provide dental care fo individuals in their areas.

The act placed a duty on the National Assembly for Wales to conduct investigations into and reviews of the provision of healthcare by a Welsh NHS body.

The act established the Commission for Social Care Inspection in relation to England and equivalent functions for Wales.

The act made certain reforms to the Welfare Food Scheme for England, Scotland and Wales in order to link the scheme more closely with the NHS. The act transferred responsibility for managing the Welfare Food Scheme in Wales to the National Assembly for Wales including decisiosn over prescribing the range of foods to be made available.

== Reception ==
The legislation was supported by the chief executive of the King's Fund, Julia Neuberger.

== See also ==
- UK enterprise law
