= Merchant Shipping (Homosexual Conduct) Act 2017 =

Act of the Parliament of the United Kingdom

Merchant Shipping (Homosexual Conduct) Act 2017 (Note: Section 2(4).)
- Act of Parliament
- Parliament of the United Kingdom
- Long title: An Act to repeal sections 146(4) and 147(3) of the Criminal Justice and Public Order Act 1994.
- Citation: 2017 c. 26
- Introduced by: John Glen (Commons); Baroness Scott of Bybook (Lords)
- Territorial extent: England and Wales; Scotland; Northern Ireland; (Note: Section 2(2)–(3). Except the repeals have the same extent as the provisions to which they relate.)

Dates
- Royal assent: 27 April 2017
- Commencement: 27 April 2017 (Note: Section 2(1).)
Other legislation
Amends	Criminal Justice and Public Order Act 1994

Status: Current legislation

History of passage through Parliament

Text of statute as originally enacted

Revised text of statute as amended

The Merchant Shipping (Homosexual Conduct) Act 2017 (c. 26) is an act of the Parliament of the United Kingdom. The act repealed parts of the Criminal Justice and Public Order Act 1994 that allowed homosexual acts to be grounds for dismissal from the crew of merchant ships.

== Background ==
The Sexual Offences Act 1967 did not apply to the merchant navy.

== Passage ==
It was introduced to Parliament as a private members bill by John Glen and Baroness Scott of Bybook.

During the passage of the legislation, the Conservative MP, Christopher Chope suggested that the repeal should be retrospective which would have quashed convictions.

=== Through the Commons ===
The Bill had its first reading in the House of Commons on 29 June 2016 and its second reading on 20 January 2017. The committee stage started on 8 February and the committee reported on 24 March. The Bill passed its third reading the same day with no amendments.

=== Through the Lords and royal assent ===
The Bill had its first reading on 27 March 2017 and its second reading on 6 April. The order of commitment was discharged and so the Bill had no committee stage in the Lords. The Bill passed its third reading on 27 of April and gained royal assent the same day.

== Provisions ==
The act repeals sections 146(4) and 147(3) of the Criminal Justice and Public Order Act 1994 which allowed conduct deemed homosexual as grounds for dismissal from the crew of a merchant ship.
