= Health Service Medical Supplies (Costs) Act 2017 =

Act of the Parliament of the United Kingdom

Health Service Medical Supplies (Costs) Act 2017 (Note: Section 13.)
- Act of Parliament
- Parliament of the United Kingdom
- Long title: An Act to make provision in connection with controlling the cost of health service medicines and other medical supplies; to make provision in connection with the provision of pricing and other information by those manufacturing, distributing or supplying those medicines and supplies, and other related products, and the disclosure of that information; and for connected purposes.
- Citation: 2017 c. 23
- Introduced by: Jeremy Hunt (Commons); Lord O’Shaughnessy (Lords)
- Territorial extent: England and Wales; Scotland; Northern Ireland; (Note: Section 11.)

Dates
- Royal assent: 27 April 2017
- Commencement: Various (Note: Section 12.)
Other legislation
Amends	National Health Service (Scotland) Act 1978; National Health Service Act 2006; National Health Service (Wales) Act 2006

Status: Amended

History of passage through Parliament

Text of statute as originally enacted

Revised text of statute as amended

The Health Service Medical Supplies (Costs) Act 2017 (c. 23) is an act of the Parliament of the United Kingdom.

== Background ==
Pharmaceutical companies were accused of charging extremely high prices for certain drugs in reporting in the Times.

At the time of the passage of the act, the National Health Service spent £15,000,000,000 on medicines and medicinal supplies.

== Provisions ==
It provides that pharmaceutical companies can be compelled to reduce the price of a generic medicine or introduce other controls on branded products in cases where charges are "unreasonable".

The act requires that access patient access be considered in the way drugs are priced.
