= Health Act 2006 =

Act of the Parliament of the United Kingdom

Health Act 2006 (Note: Section 84(1).)
- Act of Parliament
- Parliament of the United Kingdom
- Long title: An Act to make provision for the prohibition of smoking in certain premises, places and vehicles and for amending the minimum age of persons to whom tobacco may be sold; to make provision in relation to the prevention and control of health care associated infections; to make provision in relation to the management and use of controlled drugs; to make provision in relation to the supervision of certain dealings with medicinal products and the running of pharmacy premises, and about orders under the Medicines Act 1968 and orders amending that Act under the Health Act 1999; to make further provision about the National Health Service in England and Wales and about the recovery of National Health Service costs; to make provision for the establishment and functions of the Appointments Commission; to make further provision about the exercise of social care training functions; and for connected purposes.
- Citation: 2006 c. 28
- Territorial extent: England and Wales (Note: Section 84(2)–(4).)

Dates
- Royal assent: 19 July 2006
- Commencement: 19 July 2006 (in part); Various; (Note: Section 83.)
Other legislation
Amends	Pharmacy Act 1954; Medicines Act 1968; Opticians Act 1989; Health Service Commissioners Act 1993; Government of Wales Act 1998; Public Audit (Wales) Act 2004
Amended by	National Health Service (Consequential Provisions) Act 2006; Sentencing Act 2020; Tobacco and Vapes Act 2026
Relates to	Health Act 1999

Status: Amended

History of passage through Parliament

Text of statute as originally enacted

Revised text of statute as amended

The Health Act 2006 (c. 28) is an act of the Parliament of the United Kingdom. It provides for a number of administrative changes in the National Health Service.

== Part 1 – Smoking ==
=== Chapter 1 – Smoke-free premises, places and vehicles ===
The act is best known for having introduced provisions for the creation of a ban on smoking in enclosed public places. This ban focuses on smoking:

- In places of work.
- In places that the public access to obtain goods and services, including private clubs.
- In other places designated by statutory instrument.

The sections of the act allowing a ban extend to England and Wales although the provisions implementing the ban came into effect separately in England and Wales. In England the ban took effect on 1 July 2007. The ban in Wales came into effect on 2 April 2007.

Smoking was banned separately in Northern Ireland and Scotland — in Northern Ireland by the Smoking (Northern Ireland) Order 2006 (SI 2006/2957) which took effect on 30 April 2007, and in Scotland (taking effect 26 March 2006) by the Smoking, Health and Social Care (Scotland) Act 2005.

In 2017, the Supreme Court held that the smoking ban contained in chapter 1 of the act did not bind the Crown, and therefore did not need to be enforced on Crown premises such as prisons.

=== Chapter 2 – Age of sale for tobacco etc ===
Section 13 granted the Secretary of State the power to increase the age for purchasing tobacco from 16 to 18.

Children and Young Persons (Sale of Tobacco etc.) Order 2007
- Statutory Instrument
- Parliament of the United Kingdom
- Citation: SI 2007/767

Dates
- Made: 7 March 2007
- Commencement: 1 October 2007
Other legislation
Made under	Health Act 2006

Text of statute as originally enacted

The Children and Young Persons (Sale of Tobacco etc.) Order 2007 (SI 2007/767) is a statutory instrument issued by the United Kingdom government on 7 March 2007, made possible by this chapter of the Health Act 2006, which raised the minimum age for buying tobacco in England and Wales from 16 to 18, taking effect on 1 October 2007. The introduction of this change was the subject of a major government publicity campaign.

== Part 7 – Final provisions ==
=== Section 83 – Commencement ===
The following orders have been made under this section:

- The Health Act 2006 (Commencement No. 1 and Transitional Provisions) Order 2006 (SI 2006/2603 (C.88))
- The Health Act 2006 (Commencement No. 2) Order 2006 (SI 2006/3125 (C.108))
- The Health Act 2006 (Commencement No. 3) Order 2007 (SI 2007/1375 (C.57))
- The Health Act 2006 (Commencement No. 4) Order 2008 (SI 2008/1147 (C.50))
- The Health Act 2006 (Commencement No. 5) Order 2008 (SI 2008/1972 (C.96))
- The Health Act 2006 (Commencement No. 6) Order 2008 (SI 2008/2714 (C.119))
- The Health Act 2006 (Commencement No. 1 and Transitional Provisions) (Wales) Order 2007 (SI 2007/204 (W.18) (C.9))
- The Health Act 2006 (Commencement No. 2) (Wales) Order 2008 (SI 2008/3171 (W.284))
- The Health Act 2006 (Commencement No. 1) (Scotland) Order 2007 (SSI 2007/9 (C.1))

== See also ==
- Smoking in the United Kingdom

== Bibliography ==
- Halsbury's Statutes
