= Health Act 2009 =

Act of the Parliament of the United Kingdom

Health Act 2009 (Note: Section 41.)
- Act of Parliament
- Parliament of the United Kingdom
- Long title: An Act to make provision about The NHS Constitution; to make provision about health care (including provision about the National Health Service and health bodies); to make provision for the control of the promotion and sale of tobacco products; to make provision about the investigation of complaints about privately arranged or funded adult social care; and for connected purposes.
- Citation: 2009 c. 21
- Introduced by: Alan Johnson (Commons); Lord Darzi of Denham (Lords)
- Territorial extent: England and Wales; Scotland (in part); Northern Ireland (in part); (Note: Section 39.)

Dates
- Royal assent: 12 November 2009
- Commencement: Various (Note: Section 40.)
Other legislation
Amends	Human Fertilisation and Embryology Act 1990; Health Service Commissioners Act 1993; Scottish Public Services Ombudsman Act 2002; Human Tissue Act 2004; National Health Service Act 2006; National Health Service (Wales) Act 2006; Safeguarding Vulnerable Groups Act 2006
Amended by	Tobacco Advertising and Promotion Act 2002; Tobacco and Vapes Act 2026

Status: Amended

History of passage through Parliament

Text of statute as originally enacted

Revised text of statute as amended

The Health Act 2009 (c. 21) is an act of the Parliament of the United Kingdom. It implements those parts of the NHS Next Stage Review that require primary legislation.

== Provisions ==
The act required providers and commissioners of NHS services to have regard to the new NHS constitution. NHS bodies are required to publish "quality accounts", which are designed to measure the quality of care delivered to patients. The act allowed the extension of direct payments to health services.

=== Section 40 – Commencement ===
The powers conferred by this section have been exercised by the following Orders:

- The Health Act 2009 (Commencement No. 1) Order 2010 (SI 2010/30 (C. 5))
- The Health Act 2009 (Commencement No. 2) Order 2010 (SI 2010/779 (C. 52))
- The Health Act 2009 (Commencement No. 3) Order 2010 (SI 2010/1068 (C. 70))
- The Health Act 2009 (Commencement No. 3) (Amendment) Order 2011 (SI 2011/1255 (C. 49))
- The Health Act 2009 (Commencement No. 4) Order 2010 (SI 2010/1863 (C. 95))
- The Health Act 2009 (Commencement No. 1) (Wales) Order 2010 (SI 2010/930 (W. 95) (C. 63))
