= Children and Social Work Act 2017 =

Act of the Parliament of the United Kingdom

Children and Social Work Act 2017 (Note: Section 71(1).)
- Act of Parliament
- Parliament of the United Kingdom
- Long title: An Act to make provision about looked after children; to make other provision in relation to the welfare of children; and to make provision about the regulation of social workers.
- Citation: 2017 c. 16
- Introduced by: Justine Greening MP, Secretary of State for Education (Commons); Lord Nash (Lords)
- Territorial extent: England and Wales; Scotland (in part); Northern Ireland (in part); (Note: Section 69.)

Dates
- Royal assent: 27 April 2017
- Commencement: various (Note: Section 70.)
Other legislation
Amends	Medicines Act 1968; House of Commons Disqualification Act 1975; Value Added Tax Act 1994; Criminal Procedure (Scotland) Act 1995; Employment Rights Act 1996; National Health Service Act 2006; National Health Service (Wales) Act 2006; Safeguarding Vulnerable Groups Act 2006; Children and Young Persons Act 2008
Amended by	Data Protection Act 2018; Sentencing Act 2020; Children's Wellbeing and Schools Act 2026

Status: Amended

History of passage through Parliament

Text of statute as originally enacted

Revised text of statute as amended

The Children and Social Work Act 2017 (c. 16) is an act of the Parliament of the United Kingdom.

The act was passed by the Conservative Government in 2017, having been launched in 2016 in the House of Lords by Parliamentary Undersecretary of State for the School System Lord Nash, and guided through the House of Commons by Edward Timpson MP, who was then Minister for Children and Families.

== Provisions ==
Section 1 sets out the 'corporate parenting' principles which an English local authority must address in its relationship with the children whom it looks after. (Note: Section 1) These principles were adopted as a means of driving change within local government so that all local authority staff and departments take ownership of their responsibilities for looked after children.

Section 34 introduced a statutory requirement for all primary schools to teach relationship education to children from September 2020 onwards. Parents cannot withdraw their children from this element of their education.

Provisions in Part Two of the act include the creation of Social Work England as the regulator for social workers. This non-departmental public body took up its role in December 2019.

The act allows for local authorities to set aside children's rights and checks on care, so that they can try out innovative ways of working.

== Reception ==
The bill which became the act was published with no prior public consultation.

The legislation was opposed by several organisations including the British Association of Social Workers, the Care Leavers' Association, Women's Aid, Liberty and the National Association of People Abused in Childhood.
