= List of acts of Senedd Cymru from 2021 =

This is a list of acts of Senedd Cymru passed in 2021. Acts of Senedd Cymru are enacted by Senedd Cymru (the Welsh Parliament; or simply the Senedd), which has legislative authority over devolved matters in relation to Wales under the authority of the Government of Wales Act 2006. All legislation passed by the Senedd is bilingual, with the English and Welsh texts being equally authoritative. Acts are cited by calendar year, in the same fashion as acts of Parliament of the United Kingdom. Each act passed in a respective year is numbered consecutively with Arabic numerals, following the prefix "asc" (or, in Welsh, "dsc").

4 acts of Senedd Cymru were passed in 2021.

indicates that an act is available to view at legislation.gov.uk, and indicates the location of the original act in the National Library of Wales.

== Acts of Senedd Cymru ==
{{legislationuk|act |- | {{|Local Government and Elections (Wales) Act 2021|cyshort=Deddf Llywodraeth Leol ac Etholiadau (Cymru) 2021|asc|1|20-01-2021|maintained=y|archived=n|An Act of Senedd Cymru to make provision about local government; local government finance; local government elections; electoral registration and electoral administration; and for connected purposes.|cylong=Deddf Senedd Cymru i wneud darpariaeth ynglŷn â llywodraeth leol; cyllid llywodraeth leol; etholiadau llywodraeth leol; cofrestru etholiadol a gweinyddu etholiadol; ac at ddibenion cysylltiedig.}} |- | {{|Welsh Elections (Coronavirus) Act 2021|cyshort=Deddf Etholiadau Cymru (Coronafeirws) 2021|asc|2|16-03-2021|maintained=y|archived=n|An Act of Senedd Cymru to provide for measures relating to protection against coronavirus to apply to Senedd Cymru elections and local government elections.|cylong=Deddf Senedd Cymru i ddarparu i fesurau sy'n ymwneud â diogelu rhag y coronafeirws fod yn gymwys i etholiadau Senedd Cymru ac etholiadau llywodraeth leol.}} |- | {{|Renting Homes (Amendment) (Wales) Act 2021|cyshort=Deddf Rhentu Cartrefi (Diwygio) (Cymru) 2021|asc|3|07-04-2021|maintained=y|archived=n|An Act of Senedd Cymru to make provision about security of occupation under the Renting Homes (Wales) Act 2016; to make miscellaneous provision relating to occupation contracts; and for connected purposes.|cylong=Deddf Senedd Cymru i wneud darpariaeth ynglŷn â sicrwydd meddiannaeth o dan Ddeddf Rhentu Cartrefi (Cymru) 2016; i wneud darpariaeth amrywiol yn ymwneud â chontractau meddiannaeth; ac at ddibenion cysylltiedig.}} |- | {{|Curriculum and Assessment (Wales) Act 2021|cyshort=Deddf Cwricwlwm ac Asesu (Cymru) 2021|asc|4|29-04-2021|maintained=y|archived=n|An Act of Senedd Cymru to establish a new framework for a curriculum for pupils of compulsory school age at maintained schools and pupil referral units, for children of compulsory school age for whom education is otherwise arranged by local authorities, for pupils at maintained nursery schools and for certain other children for whom nursery education is provided; to make provision about progression and assessment in connection with a curriculum for those pupils and children; to make provision about a curriculum for pupils above compulsory school age at maintained schools; and for connected purposes.|cylong=Deddf gan Senedd Cymru i sefydlu fframwaith newydd ar gyfer cwricwlwm i ddisgyblion o'r oedran ysgol gorfodol mewn ysgolion a gynhelir ac unedau cyfeirio disgyblion, i blant o'r oedran ysgol gorfodol y mae addysg fel arall wedi ei threfnu ar eu cyfer gan awdurdodau lleol, i ddisgyblion mewn ysgolion meithrin a gynhelir ac i blant penodol eraill y darperir addysg feithrin ar eu cyfer; i wneud darpariaeth ynghylch cynnydd ac asesu mewn cysylltiad â chwricwlwm i'r disgyblion hynny a'r plant hynny; i wneud darpariaeth ynghylch cwricwlwm i ddisgyblion sy'n hŷn na'r oedran ysgol gorfodol mewn ysgolion a gynhelir; ac at ddibenion cysylltiedig.}} }}
