= Local Audit and Accountability Act 2014 =

Act of the Parliament of the United Kingdom

Local Audit and Accountability Act 2014 (Note: Section 50.)
- Act of Parliament
- Parliament of the United Kingdom
- Long title: An Act to make provision for and in connection with the abolition of the Audit Commission for Local Authorities and the National Health Service in England; to make provision about the accounts of local and certain other public authorities and the auditing of those accounts; to make provision about the appointment, functions and regulation of local auditors; to make provision about data matching; to make provision about examinations by the Comptroller and Auditor General relating to English local and other public authorities; to make provision about the publication of information by smaller authorities; to make provision about compliance with codes of practice on local authority publicity; to make provision about access to meetings and documents of local government bodies; to make provision about council tax referendums; to make provision about polls consequent on parish meetings; and for connected purposes.
- Citation: 2014 c. 2
- Introduced by: Eric Pickles MP, Secretary of State for Communities and Local Government (Commons); Baroness Hanham (Lords)
- Territorial extent: England and Wales; Scotland (in part); Northern Ireland (in part); (Note: Section 48.)

Dates
- Royal assent: 30 January 2014
- Commencement: Various (Note: Section 49.)
Other legislation
Amends	Public Health Act 1875; House of Commons Disqualification Act 1975; Housing Associations Act 1985; Airports Act 1986; Town and Country Planning Act 1990; Social Security Administration Act 1992; Social Security Administration (Northern Ireland) Act 1992; Police Act 1996; Countryside and Rights of Way Act 2000; Anti-terrorism, Crime and Security Act 2001; Public Audit (Wales) Act 2004; National Health Service Act 2006; National Health Service (Wales) Act 2006; National Health Service (Consequential Provisions) Act 2006; Charities Act 2011
Repeals/revokes	Audit Commission Act 1998
Amended by	Cities and Local Government Devolution Act 2016; Investigatory Powers Act 2016; Policing and Crime Act 2017

Status: Amended

History of passage through Parliament

Text of statute as originally enacted

Revised text of statute as amended

The Local Audit and Accountability Act 2014 (c. 2) is an act of the Parliament of the United Kingdom.

== Provisions ==
Its main provisions:

- abolish the Audit Commission and repeal the Audit Commission Act 1998 (section 1)
- establish new arrangements for the audit and accountability of local public bodies
- ensure increases set by levying bodies are taken into account when local authorities determine whether they have set an excessive amount of council tax
- ensure local authorities comply with the Code of Recommended Practice on Local Authority Publicity (section 39), stopping councils from publishing free sheets which were competing with local newspapers
- allow local residents to film, tweet and blog council meetings
- allow the Secretary of State for Communities and Local Government to alter the number of electors needed to trigger a parish poll

== Local Audit (Public Access to Documents) Act 2017 ==
The Local Audit (Public Access to Documents) Act 2017 amended the 2014 act to allow for public access to certain local audit documents.
