= Audit Commission Act 1998 =

Act of the Parliament of the United Kingdom

Audit Commission Act 1998 (Note: Section 55(1).)
- Act of Parliament
- Parliament of the United Kingdom
- Long title: An Act to consolidate Part III of the Local Government Finance Act 1982 and other enactments relating to the Audit Commission for Local Authorities and the National Health Service in England and Wales.
- Citation: 1998 c. 18
- Territorial extent: England and Wales (Note: Section 55(3).)

Dates
- Royal assent: 11 June 1998
- Commencement: 11 September 1998 (Note: Section 55(2).)
- Repealed: 1 April 2015 (Note: The Local Audit and Accountability Act 2014 (Commencement No. 7, Transitional Provisions and Savings) Order 2015 (SI 2015/841).)

Other legislation
- Amends: Public Health Act 1875; See § Repealed enactments
- Repeals/revokes: See § Repealed enactments
- Amended by: Countryside and Rights of Way Act 2000; Statute Law (Repeals) Act 2004; National Health Service (Consequential Provisions) Act 2006
- Repealed by: Local Audit and Accountability Act 2014

Status: Repealed

Text of statute as originally enacted

Revised text of statute as amended

The Audit Commission Act 1998 (c. 18) was an act of the Parliament of the United Kingdom that consolidated enactments related to the Audit Commission for local authorities and the National Health Service in England and Wales.

== Provisions ==
=== Repealed enactments ===
Section 54(3) of the act repealed 31 enactments and revoked 1 instrument, listed in schedule 5 to the act.

Citation	Short title	Extent of repeal
1982 c. 32	Local Government Finance Act 1982	Sections 11 to 36.
1982 c. 32	Local Government Finance Act 1982	Section 38(5) and (6).
1982 c. 32	Local Government Finance Act 1982	Schedule 3.
1982 c. 32	Local Government Finance Act 1982	Schedule 5.
1982 c. 32	Local Government Finance Act 1982	In Schedule 6, Part IV.
1983 c. 29	Miscellaneous Financial Provisions Act 1983	In Schedule 2, the entry relating to the Local Government Finance Act 1982.
1984 c. 32	London Regional Transport Act 1984	In Schedule 6, paragraph 26.
1985 c. 9	Companies Consolidation (Consequential Provisions) Act 1985	In Schedule 2, the entry relating to the Local Government Finance Act 1982.
1985 c. 43	Local Government (Access to Information) Act 1985	In Schedule 2, paragraph 7.
1985 c. 51	Local Government Act 1985	Section 63(6).
1985 c. 51	Local Government Act 1985	Section 72(3).
1985 c. 67	Transport Act 1985	In Schedule 3, paragraph 8.
1985 c. 67	Transport Act 1985	In Schedule 7, paragraph 22.
1988 c. 4	Norfolk and Suffolk Broads Act 1988	Section 17(10) and (12).
1988 c. 9	Local Government Act 1988	Section 30.
1988 c. 9	Local Government Act 1988	Schedule 4.
1988 c. 33	Criminal Justice Act 1988	In Schedule 11, paragraph 8.
1988 c. 40	Education Reform Act 1988	Section 220.
1988 c. 41	Local Government Finance Act 1988	In Schedule 12, paragraph 3.
1989 c. 42	Local Government and Housing Act 1989	In section 11(1), the words "section 17 of the Local Government Finance Act 1982 or".
1989 c. 42	Local Government and Housing Act 1989	In section 66(5)(b), the words from "Part III" to "and".
1989 c. 42	Local Government and Housing Act 1989	Section 184(2).
1990 c. 19	National Health Service and Community Care Act 1990	Section 20(1) and (3) to (8).
1990 c. 19	National Health Service and Community Care Act 1990	Schedule 4.
1991 c. 15	Local Government Finance (Publicity for Auditors' Reports) Act 1991	The whole act.
1992 c. 13	Further and Higher Education Act 1992	In Schedule 8, paragraph 51.
1992 c. 19	Local Government Act 1992	Sections 1 to 7.
1992 c. 19	Local Government Act 1992	In section 28, the definitions of "the 1982 Act", "the Audit Commission" and "auditor", and subsection (2).
1992 c. 19	Local Government Act 1992	Section 29(1).
1992 c. 19	Local Government Act 1992	Section 30(2).
1993 c. 47	Probation Service Act 1993	In Schedule 3, paragraph 6.
1994 c. 29	Police and Magistrates' Courts Act 1994	In Schedule 4, paragraphs 25 to 28.
1994 c. 30	Education Act 1994	In Schedule 2, paragraph 8(1) and (5).
1995 c. 17	Health Authorities Act 1995	In Schedule 1, paragraph 106.
1995 c. 25	Environment Act 1995	In Schedule 7, paragraph 19.
1995 c. x	London Local Authorities Act 1995	In Part I of the Schedule, the words "Local Government Finance Act 1982: section 16."
1996 c. 10	Audit (Miscellaneous Provisions) Act 1996	Sections 1, 2, 3, 5 and 6.
1996 c. 16	Police Act 1996	In Schedule 7, paragraph 1(2)(s).
1996 c. 18	Employment Rights Act 1996	In Schedule 1, paragraphs 19 and 45(3)(a).
1996 c. 52	Housing Act 1996	In Schedule 3, paragraph 2.
1996 c. 56	Education Act 1996	In Schedule 37, paragraph 78.
1997 c. 44	Education Act 1997	In Schedule 7, paragraph 5.
1997 c. 47	Social Security Administration (Fraud) Act 1997	Section 6.
1997 c. 47	Social Security Administration (Fraud) Act 1997	In Schedule 1, paragraph 1.
1997 c. 50	Police Act 1997	In Schedule 6, paragraphs 19 to 22.
SI 1991/724	High Court and County Courts Jurisdiction Order 1991	In the Schedule, in Part I, the entry relating to the Local Government Finance Act 1982.

== Subsequent developments ==
The whole act was repealed by section 1(2) of the Local Audit and Accountability Act 2014, which came into force on 1 April 2015. (Note: The Local Audit and Accountability Act 2014 (Commencement No. 7, Transitional Provisions and Savings) Order 2015 (SI 2015/841).)
