= Health and Care Act 2022 =

Act of the Parliament of the United Kingdom

Health and Care Act 2022 (Note: Section 187.)
- Act of Parliament
- Parliament of the United Kingdom
- Long title: An Act to make provision about health and social care.
- Citation: 2022 c. 31
- Introduced by: Sajid Javid, Secretary of State for Health and Social Care (Commons); Lord Kamall, Parliamentary Under-Secretary of State for Technology, Innovation and Life Sciences (Lords)
- Territorial extent: England and Wales; Scotland (in part); Northern Ireland (in part); (Note: Section 185.)

Dates
- Royal assent: 28 April 2022
- Commencement: various (Note: Section 186.)
Other legislation
Amends	Abortion Act 1967Employers' Liability (Compulsory Insurance) Act 1969; House of Commons Disqualification Act 1975; Company Directors Disqualification Act 1986; Human Fertilisation and Embryology Act 1990; Water Industry Act 1991; Health Service Commissioners Act 1993; Value Added Tax Act 1994; Criminal Procedure (Scotland) Act 1995; Education Act 1996; Domestic Violence, Crime and Victims Act 2004; National Health Service Act 2006; National Health Service (Wales) Act 2006; Safeguarding Vulnerable Groups Act 2006; Charities Act 2011; Counter-Terrorism and Security Act 2015; Cities and Local Government Devolution Act 2016; Data Protection Act 2018; Domestic Abuse Act 2021; Police, Crime, Sentencing and Courts Act 2022
Amended by	Levelling-up and Regeneration Act 2023; Health and Social Care Information Centre (Transfer of Functions, Abolition and Transitional Provisions) Regulations 2023; Health Education England (Transfer of Functions, Abolition and Transitional Provisions) Regulations 2023

Status: Amended

History of passage through Parliament

Text of statute as originally enacted

Revised text of statute as amended

The Health and Care Act 2022 (c. 31) is an act of the Parliament of the United Kingdom, which was created to dismantle many of the structures established by the Health and Social Care Act 2012. Many of the proposals were drafted under the leadership of Simon Stevens and are intended to reinforce the ambitions of the NHS Long Term Plan.

It was introduced into the House of Commons in July 2021 and was the first substantial health legislation in the premiership of Boris Johnson. It was proposed to take effect in April 2022, but in December 2021 it was reported that implementation would be delayed until July 2022.

The legislation provided for a lifetime £86,000 cap on the amount anyone in England would have to spend on their social care. It was originally planned that the cap would be introduced in October 2023, but in the 2022 autumn statement the Chancellor of the Exchequer, Jeremy Hunt, announced it would be delayed until October 2025. In July 2024 the new Chancellor, Rachel Reeves, announced her decision to cancel the introduction of the cap on social care costs entirely.

== The act ==
The act put integrated care systems on a statutory footing, and merged NHS England and NHS Improvement. It provided for the Care Quality Commission to assess how local authorities deliver their adult social care functions. The Department of Health and Social Care launched a consultation on a proposed new 'provider selection regime' in 2022. This took effect with the passing of the act, and effectively ended the NHS internal market as NHS commissioners are no longer automatically obliged to put clinical services out to tender. It includes provisions which give the Secretary of State for Health and Social Care more power to direct NHS agencies, including NHS England and Improvement, and over "notifiable" service changes, which are to be defined in regulations. If ministers "call in" a reconfiguration proposal for review, they must make a final decision within six months. It established an integrated care board and an integrated care partnership in every part of England. Each board is required to have, as a minimum:

- Four executives: the chief executive and finance, nursing and medical directors.
- Three independent non-executives: a chair and at least two others. They "will normally not hold positions or offices in other health and care organisations within the ICS footprint".
- Three "partner members": one from an NHS trust/foundation trust in the patch, one from general practice, and one from a local authority.

It allows NHS Digital to collect more information on medicines to analyse their use and safety and request information from private providers, and makes it a criminal offence to share that data inappropriately.

It puts an £86,000 cap on the amount anyone in England will have to spend on their personal care over their lifetime. The act criminalises "aiding and abetting" women to undergo hymenorrhaphy, or hymen reconstruction surgery, along with virginity testing. The government agreed three amendments in discussions in the House of Lords relating to mental health in February 2022: requiring the definition of 'health' to include mental health; to place a duty on new integrated care boards to have mental health expertise; and to require more transparency and accountability on mental health funding.

It was claimed that the act will "dispose of unnecessary bureaucracy that has held the health service back", and will ensure the NHS is "more accountable to government". The act also includes a target of the NHS achieving net zero carbon emissions by 2040.

== Reception ==
The act's social care provisions have been criticised as insufficient, especially for failing to address the workforce shortage, and for leaving the "cap on care costs far less fair and generous than originally expected. Poorer people with lower wealth will be hit hardest – and some will still face crippling social care costs," according to the Health Foundation.
