= National Health Service (Private Finance) Act 1997 =

Act of the Parliament of the United Kingdom

National Health Service (Private Finance) Act 1997 (Note: Section 3(1).)
- Act of Parliament
- Parliament of the United Kingdom
- Long title: An Act to make provision about the powers of National Health Service trusts to enter into agreements.
- Citation: 1997 c. 56
- Territorial extent: England and Wales; Scotland; Northern Ireland (section 2 only); (Note: Section 3(2).)

Dates
- Royal assent: 15 July 1997
- Commencement: 15 July 1997 (Note: Section 4(b) of the Interpretation Act 1978.)
Other legislation
Amended by	National Health Service Reform (Scotland) Act 2004; National Health Service (Consequential Provisions) Act 2006

Status: Partially repealed

Text of statute as originally enacted

Revised text of statute as amended

The National Health Service (Private Finance) Act 1997 (c. 56) is an act of the Parliament of the United Kingdom which enabled NHS trusts to borrow money or rent out property in loan agreements with the private sector, to expand their facilities or build new buildings. As it enabled a major kind of private finance initiative, it has been highly controversial.

== Background ==
The act was introduced by the New Labour government, following the 1997 general election. While the Private Finance Initiative (PFI) had been launched in 1992 under the John Major administration, its application to the NHS was stalled due to legal uncertainties regarding the statutory powers of NHS trusts to enter into long-term binding contracts with private consortia.

At the time the act was passed there were 73 schemes awaiting approval.

== Provisions ==
The act provided a legal framework for the use of the PFI to finance NHS projects. The act "removed any element of doubt" for private lenders and banks by explicitly granting NHS trusts the power to enter into "externally financed development agreements." This legal clarification allowed for the first major wave of PFI hospital construction, with 14 new acute hospitals approved immediately following the act's passage.

Section 1 as enacted provided:

1 Powers of NHS trusts to enter into agreements

(1) The powers of a National Health Service trust include power to enter into externally financed development agreements.
(2) For the purposes of this section, an agreement is an externally financed development agreement if it is certified as such in writing by the Secretary of State.
(3) The Secretary of State may give a certificate under this section if—

(a) in his opinion the purpose or main purpose of the agreement is the provision of facilities in connection with the discharge by the trust of any of its functions; and
(b) a person proposes to make a loan to, or provide any other form of finance for, another party in connection with the agreement.

The remainder of section 1 allowed a trust that entered into an externally financed development agreement to enter into an agreement with the person proposing to provide the finance, and specified that an agreement would be valid regardless of whether it had been certified or not. Section 2 made provision about Orders in Council for Northern Ireland made under the Northern Ireland Act 1974 for purposes corresponding to those of section 1, which were to be subject to annulment rather than affirmative resolution. Section 3 provided the short title and extended section 2, but not section 1, to Northern Ireland.

== Impact and criticism ==
The act facilitated a shift in NHS capital funding. By 2001, approximately 85% of major NHS capital projects were funded through PFI rather than traditional public procurement.

While proponents argued that PFI allowed for the rapid modernisation of crumbling hospital infrastructure without an immediate increase in public borrowing, critics pointed to the long-term financial burden. Analysis suggested that the cost of private borrowing was significantly higher than Treasury rates, and that the long-term "availability payments" made by NHS trusts to private companies created a rigid "off-balance-sheet" debt that could squeeze clinical budgets.

Some hospital re-developments funded via PFI resulted in fewer beds, for example a scheme in Worcestershire led to fewer beds than previously, with some hospitals also having to pay significant amounts of their budgets to charges related to building and support fees.

== Subsequent developments ==
Section 1 was amended in Scotland by the National Health Service Reform (Scotland) Act 2004, with effect from 30 July 2004, so that the power to enter into externally financed development agreements belongs to Health Boards, Special Health Boards and the Common Services Agency for the Scottish Health Service in place of NHS trusts. It was repealed in England and Wales by the National Health Service (Consequential Provisions) Act 2006, with effect from 1 March 2007.

== See also ==
- Private Finance Initiative
- UK enterprise law
