= Public Services Ombudsman for Wales =

Public Services Ombudsman for Wales Welsh: Ombwdsmon Gwasanaethau Cyhoeddus Cymru
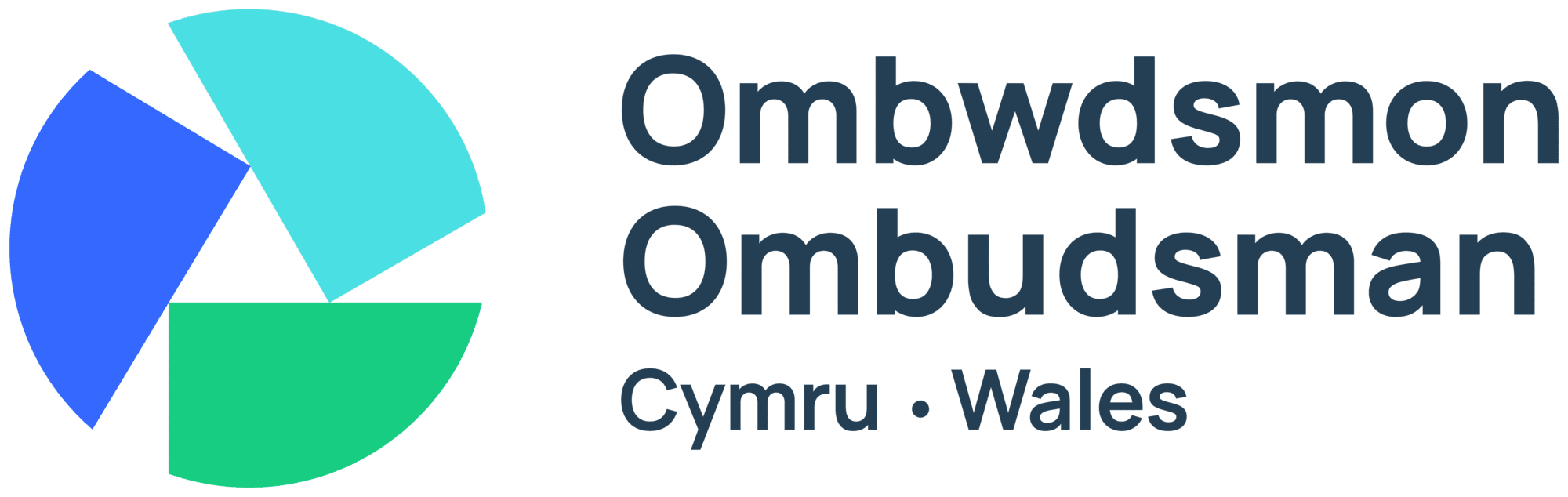
- Type: Independent public body
- Region served: Wales
- Ombudsman: Michelle Morris
- Staff: Just over 70
- Website: www.ombudsman.wales

The Public Services Ombudsman for Wales (Welsh: Ombwdsmon Gwasanaethau Cyhoeddus Cymru) was established by section 1(1) of the Public Services Ombudsman (Wales) Act 2005. The Public Services Ombudsman for Wales brings together the jurisdictions of various offices she replaced, namely the Local Government Ombudsman for Wales, the Health Service Ombudsman for Wales, the Welsh Administration Ombudsman and the Social Housing Ombudsman for Wales.

The Ombudsman has a dual role. Firstly, under the above Act, she investigates complaints by members of the public concerning maladministration, failure in a relevant service or failure to provide a relevant service by any "listed authority" in Wales. Secondly, under the Local Government Act 2000, she is responsible for policing ethical standards in local authorities.

The Ombudsman is appointed by the Monarch. The current Ombudsman is Michelle Morris who was appointed in April 2022.

== Maladministration and failure of service ==
The "listed authorities" subject to the Ombudsman's supervision in regard to maladministration or failure of service are:

- The Welsh Government
- Local authorities
- Fire authorities
- Police authorities
- Joint boards of all local authorities in Wales
- National park authorities
- The Countryside Council for Wales
- The Environment Agency
- The Forestry Commissioners
- Regional flood defence committees
- Internal drainage boards
- The Care Council for Wales
- Local health boards
- NHS trusts and special health authorities
- Community health councils
- Various other listed health providers
- Social landlords
- The National Council for Education and Training for Wales
- The Office of Her Majesty's Chief Inspector of Education and Training in Wales
- The Higher Education Funding Council for Wales
- State school governing bodies in relation to the admission of pupils (and admission and exclusion appeal panels)
- The Arts Council of Wales
- The Sport Wales
- The Wales Tourist Board
- The Welsh Development Agency
- The Welsh Language Board

== Ethical Standards and Codes of Conduct ==
Part of the Ombudsman's role is to investigate complaints that members of local government bodies have behaved wrongly.

The Ombudsman has issued statutory guidance known as Guidance for members of county and county borough councils, fire and rescue authorities and national park authorities, and Guidance from the Public Services Ombudsman for Wales for members of community councils. Each local authority must adopt a Code of Conduct.

The Ombudsman has power to investigate any complaint referred to her. If she concludes that there is evidence which warrants doing so, she will send a formal report either to the authority's standards committee or to the Adjudication Panel for Wales. It will be for the authority or the Panel to decide if the code of conduct has been broken and if so, what penalty to impose on the member concerned. The maximum penalty the Panel may impose is five years’ disqualification from office.

Those who are subject to such supervision are the following types of authority in Wales and the members of any of them:

- Community council
- County or County Borough Council
- Fire authority
- Police authority
- National park authority

== See also ==
- Standards Board for England
- Adjudication Panel for England
- Northern Ireland Public Services Ombudsman
- Standards Commission for Scotland
- Ethical Standards in Public Life etc. (Scotland) Act 2000
