= Public Service Ombudsman =

UK government agency

Agency overview
- Formed: 1973
- Preceding agency: Parliamentary and Health Service Ombudsman
- Jurisdiction: United Kingdom
- Headquarters: Millbank Tower, London, United Kingdom
- Employees: 582 (2023/24)
- Agency executive: Paula Sussex, Public Service Ombudsman
- Website: www.ombudsman.org.uk

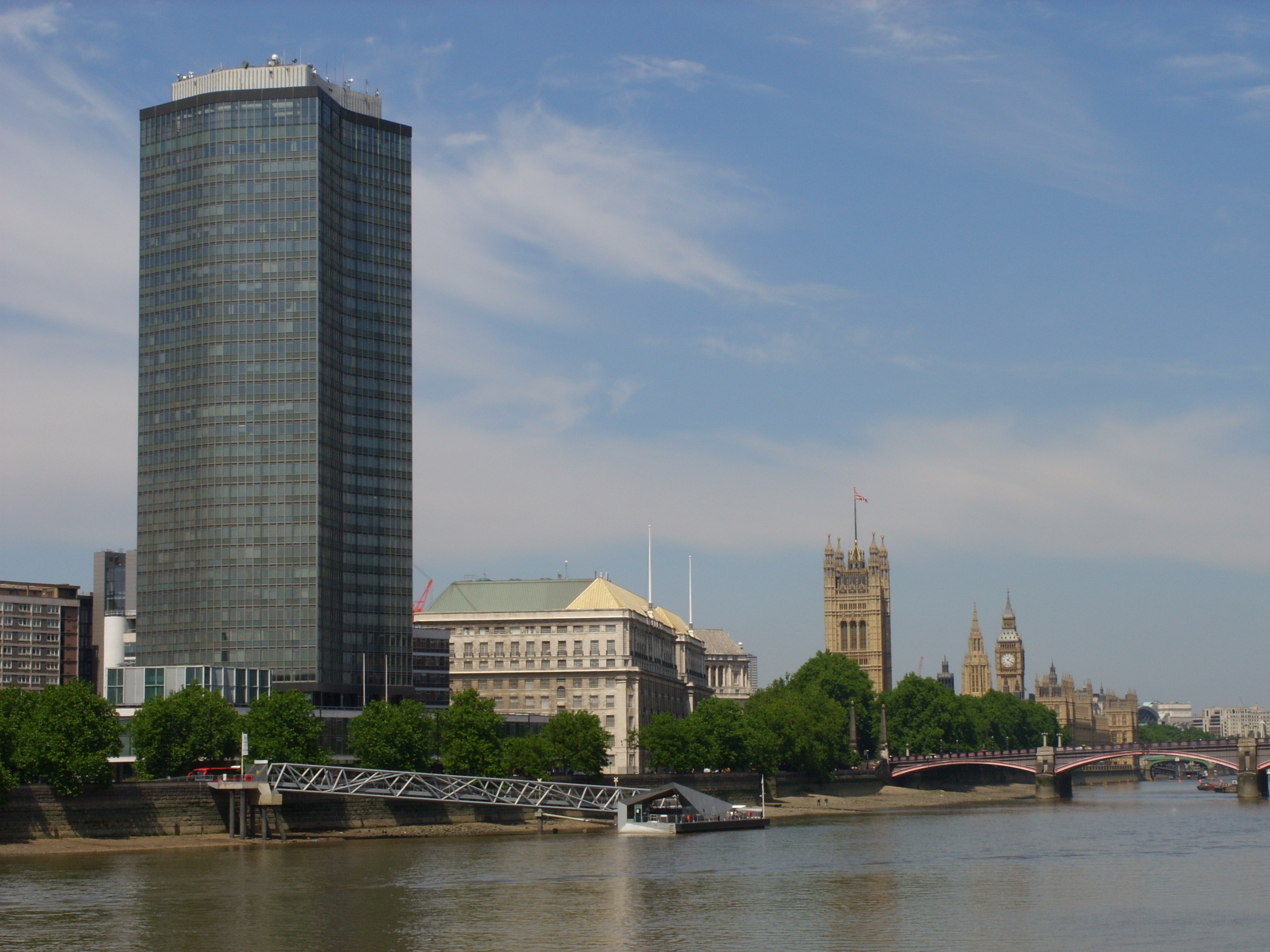
Millbank Tower, the current location of the Parliamentary and Health Service Ombudsman

The Public Service Ombudsman (formerly Parliamentary and Health Service Ombudsman) comprises the offices of the Parliamentary Commissioner for Administration (PCA) and the Health Service Commissioner for England (HSC). The ombudsman is responsible for considering complaints by the public that UK Government departments, public authorities and the National Health Service in England have not acted properly or fairly or have provided a poor service.

The ombudsman is appointed by the Crown on the recommendation of the Prime Minister and is accountable to Parliament. The ombudsman is independent of both the Government and the civil service and reports annually to both Houses of Parliament.

The current ombudsman is Paula Sussex.

On October 1 2026, the Parliamentary and Health Service Ombudsman became the Public Service Ombudsman.

The offices of the Parliamentary and Health Service Ombudsman are at Millbank Tower, London, however the majority of staff are now based in Manchester.

Timeline
← / Crichel Down affair; ← / Whyatt Report; ← / 1964 general election; ← / Parliamentary Commissioner Act 1967; ← / Sachsenhausen; ← / National Health Service Reorganisation Act 1973; ← / Overlapping TV licences and Court Line; ← / War Pensions Injustice Remedied; ← / Preece case; ← / Barlow Clowes; ← / Compensation for slaughtered poultry; ← / Channel Tunnel; ← / Clinical judgment within remit; ← / Reeman case; ← / SERPS report; ← / Report on NHS continuing care; ← / A Debt of Honour; ← / Pensions promise report; ← / Equitable Life; ← / Ombudsman's Principles; ← / Care & Compassion; ← / Time to Act Sepsis Report

== History ==
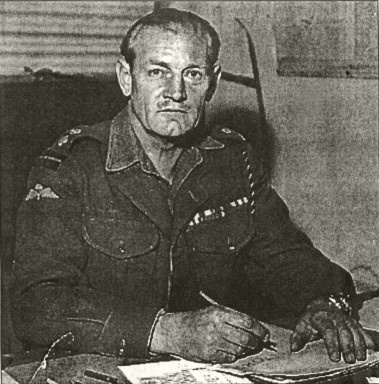
Lieutenant-Colonel Jack Churchill was imprisoned in Sachsenhausen concentration camp and subsequently refused compensation by the Foreign Office. This decision was reversed after a report by the ombudsman in 1968.

The creation of the post of the Parliamentary Ombudsman was spurred on by the 1954 Crichel Down affair and by the activism of pressure groups, including the Society for Individual Freedom. The position was created, and his or her powers are documented in, the Parliamentary Commissioner Act 1967, the most notable section of which is section 4 and Schedule 2, which constrain the powers of the incumbent Ombudsman. Among other things, the ombudsman cannot investigate personnel and commercial actions.

The position of HSC was created later, under the Health Service Commissioners Act 1993. The office of the Parliamentary and Health Service Ombudsman emphasises that it looks into complaints "that government departments, their agencies and some other public bodies in the UK – and the NHS in England – have not acted properly or fairly or have provided a poor service." The first UK ombudsman was Sir Edmund Compton who had previously been the Comptroller and Auditor General. He was succeeded by Sir Alan Marre, a career civil servant. He was the first ombudsman appointed for the National Health Service and combined that role with that of the Parliamentary Ombudsman as have all his successors. He later became chairman of Age Concern. The post was held by Dame Julie Mellor from January 2012 until July 2016.

== Process ==
The remit of the ombudsman was extended in 1973 to cover the National Health Service. In 1996, the ombudsman was empowered to investigate complaints about clinical judgment.

By law, complaints made to the Parliamentary Ombudsman about UK Government departments and other UK public organisations must be referred by a Member of Parliament (MP). This is sometimes referred to as the 'MP filter'. The ombudsman will only look into complaints if the organisation complained about has been given the opportunity to put things right first. The ombudsman often receives enquiries which have not yet reached a stage where they can be investigated, usually because the complainant has not completed the complaints procedure of the organisation complained about.

Complaints about the NHS in England do not require an MP referral but both complaint processes require that the organisation complained about has had the opportunity to put things right.

== Powers ==
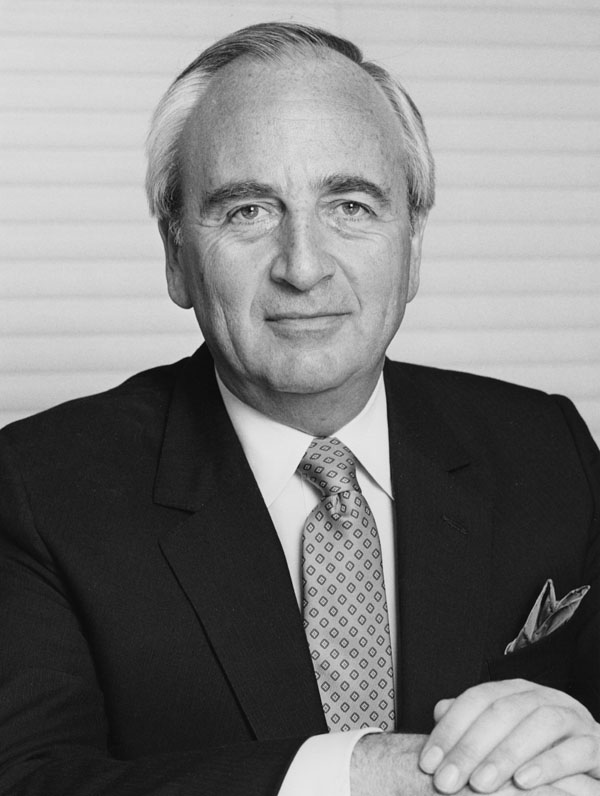
Lord Young, whose Department was criticised by the ombudsman over its licensing of the Barlow Clowes group of companies. Barlow Clowes collapsed in 1988 owing £190 million.

The ombudsman may investigate the administrative actions of a Government department or a public authority after a Member of Parliament has referred a complaint by a member of public who claims to have suffered injustice as a result of maladministration. The ombudsman may investigate maladministration or a failure of service within the National Health Service upon receiving a complaint by anyone who claims to have suffered injustice as a result of that maladministration or service failure.

The ombudsman possesses wide powers of investigation and is able to determine the procedure for the investigation and to obtain information from such people as required. In respect of the gathering of evidence and the examination of witnesses, the ombudsman has the same authority as the High Court. Defiance of these powers can be treated as contempt of court.

If the ombudsman finds that there has been injustice caused by maladministration or a failure in service, a remedy to put things right can be proposed. This can include an apology, a compensation payment for hardship or injustice and compensation for financial loss. Although the ombudsman does not possess the power to compel a public authority to adhere to its findings, in practice, the public authority will comply. In 2010–11, more than 99% of the individual recommendations for remedy made by the ombudsman were accepted by the body complained about.

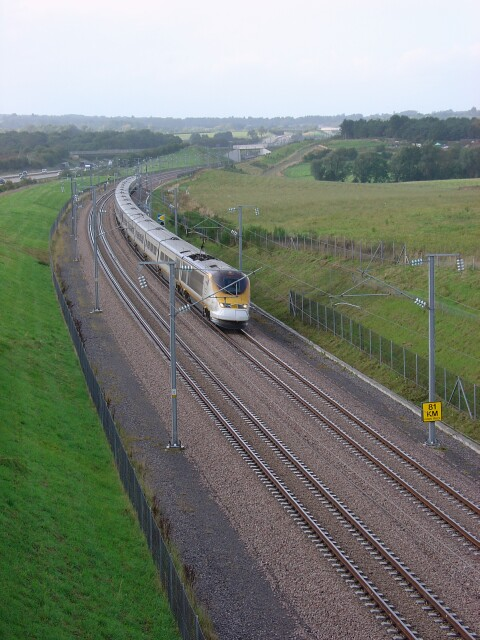
A Eurostar train near Ashford. In 1995, the ombudsman investigated complaints made by residents in Kent about how the Government had administered plans for the high-speed rail-link. They alleged that uncertainty caused depreciation in property values.

In rare instances where the body complained about does not accept the ombudsman's findings, the ombudsman may lay a report before Parliament explaining that the injustice done to the complainant has not been, or will not likely to be, remedied. In such an event, the select committee that oversees the work of the ombudsman is able to examine the matter and reach its own conclusions.

Reports issued by the ombudsman are susceptible to judicial review by the courts. However, it has been held that the court would not readily interfere with the exercise of the ombudsman's discretion.

From 19 August 2014, members of the public have been able to search the summaries of investigations that the Parliamentary and Health Service Ombudsman has completed and published on their website.

In October 2014, Julie Mellor and Local Government Ombudsman Jane Martin argued for a combined Health and Local Government watchdog, which would be able to instigate investigations as it sees fit, instead of them being triggered by patient complaints. Rob Behrens said in November 2018 after the publication of a favourable report into the organisation by the Republic of Ireland ombudsman that he wanted a change in the law so the Ombudsman could launch investigations without a formal complaint. He wanted it to become a complaints standards authority with regulatory powers over the NHS as is the case in Scotland. The report said the law regulating the office was outdated and out of line with similar organisations in the UK and elsewhere.

== Criticism ==
Some issues highlighted by Liam Donaldson in 2018 following the "avoidable death" of Oliver McGowan remain to be addressed.

== List of Parliamentary and Health Service Ombudsmen ==
- Sir Edmund Compton – 1 April 1967 – 31 March 1971
  - Compton did not serve as Health Service Commissioner.
- Sir Alan Marre – 1 April 1971 – 31 March 1976
  - Marre served as Health Service Commissioner for England, Scotland and Wales from 1 October 1973 onwards.
- Sir Idwal Pugh – 1 April 1976 – 31 December 1978
- Sir Cecil Clothier – 3 January 1979 – 31 December 1984
- Sir Anthony Barrowclough – 1 January 1985 – 31 December 1989
- Sir William Reid – 1 January 1990 – 31 December 1996
- Sir Michael Buckley – 1 January 1997 – 3 November 2002
  - Buckley ceased to be Health Service Commissioner for Scotland from 23 October 2002 following the establishment of the Scottish Public Services Ombudsman.
- Ann Abraham – 4 November 2002 – 31 December 2011
  - Abraham ceased to be Health Service Commissioner for Wales from 30 September 2003 following the establishment of the Public Services Ombudsman for Wales.
- Dame Julie Mellor – 1 January 2012 – 1 January 2017
- Rob Behrens – 6 April 2017 – 27 March 2024
- Rebecca Hilsenrath - 19 April 2024 - 26 June 2025
- Paula Sussex - 26 June 2025 – present

== See also ==
- Public Services Ombudsman for Wales
- Northern Ireland Ombudsman
- Scottish Public Services Ombudsman
