= European School of Economics =

- Motto: visibilia ex invisibilibus
- Type: Private Business School
- Established: 1994
- President: Elio D'Anna
- Location: London, Madrid, Rome, Milan, Florence, Genoa
- Website: www.ese.ac.uk

The European School of Economics (ESE) is a private college of higher education. It is accredited by ASIC, validated by Richmond, The American International University in London, and is a registered UK learning provider (UKPRN 10061489). ESE offers UK bachelor's degree, master's degree, MBA, and specialised short programmes at its centres in London, Rome, Milan, Florence, Genoa and Madrid.

== History ==
The European School of Economics was founded in Italy, in 1994. In 1997, former President of the Soviet Union and Nobel Peace Prize winner Mikhail Gorbachev, addressed ESE's students as part of the "Peace is Economy" conference, organized by ESE for the inauguration of the Academic Year.

In 2013, the European School of Economics UK Ltd. (ESE Foundation) became a charity.. ESE campuses are presently managed by ESE Italy, ESE Spain, ESE Insight Ltd, and ESE New York Inc.

In 2021, ESE was the winner of the 'Global Student Satisfaction Awards' by StudyPortals, winning for the category of 'Quality of Student Life' against over 4000 participating universities and other national higher education institutes.

== Accreditation and educational system ==
The European School of Economics (ESE) is a UK- and European-accredited educational institution, a member of the Listed Bodies with UCAS Accreditation, ASIC Premier Institution Status, as well OIA, and Erasmus + membership.

ESE students can earn a Bachelor of Science (Honours) in marketing, finance, management, or media and communications, a Master of Science in finance, management or marketing, or an MBA. Admissions at ESE are carried out on a rolling basis for each particular intake, with only a limited number of places available in each campus.

ESE's undergraduate bachelor's degree is a three-year-program, and students may study and switch amongst any ESE centers worldwide at any point throughout the academic year. Every year students also have to complete internships which are sourced by ESE, selecting from more than 1500 organisations around the world. In their annual review of the institution, the QAA highlighted these practices, noting the "opportunities for students to undertake comprehensive internships and transfer between international campuses (paragraph 2.7) ...and the robust and systematic approach to the management of information, which is coordinated with partner campuses overseas (paragraph 3.4)."

== Awarding of UK degrees ==
The European School of Economics (ESE) awards UK degree courses in its centers in London, Rome, Florence, Milan, Genoa and Madrid in partnership with a number of UK universities and other legally recognised degree-awarding bodies. Since its founding in 1994, ESE academic partners have been:

- University of Hertfordshire
- The Nottingham Trent University
- University of Buckingham
- New Charter University
- University of Chichester
- Richmond, The American International University in London

== Notable alumni ==
This list of ESE's alumni comprises notable graduates as well as non-graduate former, and current, students.

- Roberto Di Matteo - Football player and Manager. As manager, he won the Champions League and FA Cup with Chelsea
- Cafu - Football player with 142 appearances for the Brazil national team, he is the most internationally capped Brazilian player of all time.

== Campuses ==
=== United Kingdom ===
In the UK, ESE is an accredited educational institution; a member of the Listed Bodies with UCAS Accreditation, ASIC Premier Institution Status, as well OIA, and Erasmus + membership. The European School of Economics is also in a partnership with the British Council and IELTS to offer training courses for the IELTS exams.

In 2014, the British Accreditation Council recognised that ESE was listed along with other institutions which lead to degrees awarded by recognised bodies. That certification has since expired. In 2014, a report by the Quality Assurance Agency for Higher Education stated that the existing partnership agreement with the Buckingham University was terminated for strategic reasons.

Students may take non-degree programmes in marketing, management, finance, hr, entrepreneurship, event management, international management, art management and consultancy.

=== Spain ===
In 2010, the Madrid campus was authorised by the Ministry of Education and the Comunidad de Madrid to teach university-level programmes leading to the award of a British degree in Spain.

=== Italy ===
The Italian campuses are officially associated with Eduitalia, an association of schools and universities offering courses to foreign students in Italy. The Milan campus, while providing all the courses available on the other campuses, has developed its specific focus on the fashion and luxury field.

In its Italian centers, ESE has a partnership with the Florence Academy of Art for the delivery of art programs, and with the Confederation of Tourism and Hospitality for a series of CTH-accredited diplomas and foundation programmes in the hospitality and tourism industry.

In 2022, ESE sealed a partnership with the FIGC, the governing body of football in Italy, and with CONI, the Italian National Olympic Committee, for the delivery of university level courses in sports management, sports marketing and sports event organisation across its centers in Milan, Rome, Genoa and Florence.

=== Lawsuit against the Italian state ===
ESE was involved in, and ultimately won, a dispute with the Italian state and with the Italian Ministry of Education. The case concerned the rights of a foreign educational institution to teach in Italy, with classes approved and monitored by an English university and leading to a degree awarded by that university, in accordance with the applicable UK laws. The Italian state argued that under the Italian laws, an English degree could not be recognised in Italy if it is awarded to an Italian citizen on completion of the course of study in Italy; whilst ESE argued that under the EU European Union law the English degree had the same legal value as the Italian one.

ESE sued the Italian state in the European Court of Justice, and on 13 November 2003, the Court ruled in ESE's favour.
