= Rob Behrens =

British businessperson

Sir Robert Fredrick Behrens CBE (born 19 January 1952) was the Parliamentary and Health Service Ombudsman from 6 April 2017 to 27 March 2024. He has previously worked as the Chief Executive and Independent Adjudicator for the Office of the Independent Adjudicator for Higher Education (OIA) and as the Complaints Commissioner for the Bar Standards Board.

== Education ==
Behrens was educated at Burnage Grammar School in Manchester. Afterwards, he went on to study Political Science and Government at the Universities of Nottingham and Exeter.

== Career ==
Behrens began his career at Coventry Polytechnic, where he lectured in Public Policy and Administration.

In 1988, he joined the Civil Service and helped develop Fast-Stream programmes on government and social policy at the Civil Service College.

In 1992, Behrens became the Director of the Southern African Development Unit which involved the preparation of a Post-Apartheid Public Service. For his work, he was personally thanked by President Nelson Mandela.

In 1997, Behrens was promoted to the Senior Civil Service where he became the Director of the International Public Service Group (IPSG). The ISPG provided valuable assistance to 25 countries in transition, including countries that were applying for membership to the European Union.

Behrens then became the Secretary to the Committee on Standards in Public Life, in 2003. The role included providing advice to the Prime Minister on issues regarding ethics and conduct of public office holders. In January 2005, he oversaw the Committee's tenth inquiry and report, and the publication of the first national survey of public attitudes towards Public Office Holders.

He left the Civil Service in 2006 to become the Complaints Commissioner of the Bar Standards Board (BSB). The BSB regulates the behaviors and set standards for Barristers in England and Wales. In July 2007, Behrens published a report regarding a strategic review of complaints and disciplinary processes for the BSB, highlighting a series of recommendations to improve the way the BSB is run. The report highlighted the strengths and weaknesses of the complaints system and targeted changes which made "common sense" to improve the system.

In the summer of 2008, Behrens became the Independent Adjudicator and Chief Executive of the Office of the Independent Adjudicator for Higher Education (OIA). He replaced the first Independent Adjudicator, Baroness Ruth Deech and became a full-time Adjudicator highlighting the rise in student complaints since its inception in 2004. Behrens' first major statement in October 2008 was to produce the Pathway Report to develop the OIA into a key stakeholder in the Higher Education spectrum, along with making sure that the day to day processes are up to standard. Key Stakeholders were invited to comment and qualitative and quantitative findings and comments were published in the report which was published in February 2010. At the end of 2010, the OIA produced the second round of the Pathway Report highlighting the key issues emerging from the Pathway Report, and in July 2011, released the Pathway 3 Consultation in reply to the Higher Education White Paper, highlighting the importance of students at the heart of the system. In January 2011, Behrens was named as a lay member of the BSB board. In June 2011, the OIA produced their Annual Report which signifies yet another record rise in complaints and singled out Academic Misconduct as an emerging issue.

Behrens was appointed Commander of the Order of the British Empire (CBE) in the 2016 New Year Honours for services to higher education. He was knighted in the 2024 King's Birthday Honours "for public service".

Behrens was appointed Parliamentary and Health Service Ombudsman on 6 April 2017, serving until he stepped down on 27 March 2024.

== Personal life ==
Behrens is an avid supporter of Manchester City Football Club and is an occasional contributor to 'The Man City Show' Podcast. Behrens is also a Trustee of the Fort Hare University Foundation, UK.

Government offices
Preceded by Julie Mellor	Parliamentary Commissioner for Administration; 2017–2024	Succeeded by Rebecca Hilsenrath
Preceded by Julie Mellor	Health Service Commissioner for England; 2017–2024	Succeeded by Rebecca Hilsenrath
