= Ann Abraham =

English public servant (born 1952)

Parliamentary Commissioner for Administration Health Service Commissioner for England
- In office 4 November 2002 – 31 December 2011
- Preceded by: Sir Michael Buckley
- Succeeded by: Dame Julie Mellor

Health Service Commissioner for Wales
- In office 4 November 2002 – 30 September 2003
- Preceded by: Sir Michael Buckley
- Succeeded by: Adam Peat

Personal details
- Born: 25 August 1952 (age 73)
- Education: Bedford College, London

Ann Abraham (born 25 August 1952) is a public servant who was the Parliamentary Commissioner for Administration and Health Service Commissioner for England (Parliamentary and Health Service Ombudsman) between 2002 and 2011.

Ann Abraham was born in 1952 and attended Kingsfield Grammar School in Bristol. She studied at Bedford College, London, graduating in German and philosophy in 1974.

She was a housing manager between 1979 and 1980, first for Tower Hamlets Council and then for Islington Council. She then joined the Housing Corporation in 1981, serving until 1990 as a regional director and then operations director. She became the Chief executive of the National Association of Citizens Advice Bureaux in 1991, serving until 1997, when she became the Legal Services Ombudsman.

== Parliamentary and Health Service Ombudsman ==
In 2002, Ann Abraham succeeded Sir Michael Buckley as Parliamentary and Health Service Ombudsman.

Her tenure as Ombudsman saw a major effort to focus the efforts of Government departments on providing good administration, departing from the traditional focus on avoiding maladministration. She confronted the Government over several serious acts of maladministration, which led to an unprecedented tabling of reports under s10(3) Parliamentary Commissioner Act 1967 in which the Ombudsman reports that injustice caused by maladministration has not is not likely to be remedied. She also maximised her powers under s10(4) Parliamentary Commissioner Act 1967 to issue special reports in order highlights significant examples of maladministration by the Government.

She finished her term as Ombudsman in December 2011 and was succeeded by Dame Julie Mellor.

=== NHS continuing care ===
The first special report published by Abraham under s10(4) Parliamentary Commissioner Act 1967 concerned NHS funding for long-term care. Two reports had previously been issued on the subject by Sir William Reid, Parliamentary and Health Service Ombudsman between 1990 and 1996. It was found by Reid that the National Health Service had failed to make long-term care available to patients with mental and physical health needs. There were also failings in how health authorities had set the eligibility criteria for funding. The report published by Abraham in February 2003 was strongly critical of the Department of Health. It was found that numerous health authorities were using criteria that was too restrictive in determining eligibility for funding for NHS care that was not in line with that laid down by the department after the judgment in ex parte Coughlan. Abraham found that the cost of caring for patients with very severe disabilities was left to relatives instead of the National Health Service. She recommended the department take a strong lead in providing a "very clear, well defined national framework" for determining eligibility. This the Government undertook to do, as well as a retrospective review of cases that it had determined. The backlog of retrospective review cases grew to such an extent that Abraham took the decision in June 2004 to accept cases directly without complainants having to exhaust the NHS complaints procedure. In a follow-up report in December 2004, Abraham criticised the shortcomings which she had discovered in the retrospective review process. Record keeping was often poor, decisions were sometimes taken without clinical advice and review processes were sometimes secretive. Once again, Abraham insisted on a national framework for criteria and recommended the development of good practice guidance to support the criteria. Thereafter, the Office engaged deeply with the department and the health authorities to ensure that cases were properly assessed according to criteria. The department published its national framework for determining funding eligibility in June 2007 and the number of NHS continuing care cases being handled by the Office shrunk from 1,500 in November 2007 to just 100 in March 2008. Through its rigorous reporting and active engagement with the department, the Office under Ann Abraham had helped bring about service improvement in the NHS and provide justice to those wrongly denied funding.

=== Trusting in the pensions promise ===
A significant number of complaints were received by members of wound-up final salary occupational pension schemes who learned that the funds of which they had been members were insufficiently funded. They complained that official information provided by the Government about the security of the pension schemes was misleading and that warnings were not provided about the risks to the schemes in response to an actuarial recommendation in 2000 that such a warning be given. In March 2006, Abraham published a report into the matter – titled Trusting in the Pensions Promise – under s10(3) Parliamentary Commissioner Act 1967 following referrals by more than 200 MPs. She found that official information provided by the Government was often inaccurate, incomplete and inconsistent; that the response to the actuarial recommendation was maladministration; and a decision to change the minimum funding requirement was done maladministratively. Complainants had sustained a sense of outrage, had lost opportunities to make informed choices or take remedial action and had suffered distress, anxiety and uncertainty. She made five recommendations, including that the Government consider arranging for the restoration of the pensions benefits. The Government rejected the report, insisting that the case for maladministration was not found out and that it was not in the public interest to compensate the pension schemes. In response, Abraham expressed disappointment at the Government's attitude and commented that it raised doubts about the commitment of the Government to the Ombudsman scheme. To the Select Committee, she noted that she sought to constructively engage with the Government: "it is maladministration, get over it and let us get on to engagement with the real issues here" The Select Committee supported Abraham, issuing a report which found that the Government bore some responsibility for compensating those affected. The Government reiterated its position and legal action by complainants followed. In the Court of Appeal it was held in February 2008 that the Government could not reject the findings of the Ombudsman without reason. The Government was compelled to reconsider Abraham's recommendation that arrangements be made to restore pension benefits. It made parallel moves to improve the Financial Assistance Scheme which provided assistance to those whose pension schemes had begun to wind up. After pressure from the Select Committee, it was ultimately decided by the Government in December 2007 to guarantee the Financial Assistance Scheme to 90%. Abraham welcomed this move as compliance with her key recommendations, although the Government did not acknowledge acceptance of her findings.

=== Equitable life ===
In July 2008, Abraham published a report into the regulatory failure of the Government in its oversight of Equitable Life, which verged on collapse in 2000 and left more than a million policyholders with significantly reduced retirement savings. Equitable Life had admitted that its customers' investments were worth £3 billion more than the company's total assets, leading to insurers slashing the policies. Abraham found ten instances of maladministration and held that the Government had failed to use the powers available to it to protect the policyholders. She criticised the Government for failing to verify the solvency of Equitable Life and failing to make sure that the information available to the public was reliable. The title of the report – A Decade of Regulatory Failure – served to emphasise the seriousness of the maladministration. Among the departments rebuked by her report was the Treasury, the Financial Services Authority, the Government Actuary's Department and the Department of Trade and Industry. She recommended that a compensation scheme be established to put people in the position they would have been in but for the maladministration. The Select Committee reinforced Abraham's position in December 2008, calling on the Government to comply with the report's recommendations. When the Government announced in January 2009 that it would assist those "hardest hit" by the collapse, Abraham declared its attitude to be "astonishing". The Government was "strong on assertion... short on facts" and was "re-arranging the evidence, re-doing the analysis and acting as judge on its own behalf". Once again, the Select Committee supported the Ombudsman, expressing disappointment at the Government's scheme of remedy. It labelled the Government "shabby, constitutionally dubious and procedurally improper" in its rejection of the recommendations. Abraham published a follow-up report in May 2009, Injustice Unremedied, under s10(3) Parliamentary Commissioner Act 1967 criticising the Government for rejecting her findings. She commented that the Government attitude "begged a rather larger question as to what the purpose of regulation was supposed to be". In May 2010, the Government announced that it would propose a Bill to implement her recommendations. However, in July 2010 it announced that an independent commission would advise how compensation would be paid and that it could include recommendations by the retired judge Sir John Chadwick, whose methodology was rejected by Abraham. His proposals, she said, "would not in any sense enable fair and transparent compensation to be delivered". In October 2010, the Chancellor of the Exchequer George Osborne announced that compensation of £1.5 billion would be paid, a settlement called "woefully inadequate" by campaigners.

=== Ombudsman's Principles ===
A major initiative of Ann Abraham was that of the Ombudsman's Principles, an attempt to prevent instances of maladministration by promoting good administration. The work on developing the Principles of Good Administration began in 2005, with the Principles being progressively reduced in number and clarified for ease of understanding. By 2006, the Principles that she sought to promote in Government departments were agreed upon as "Getting it right", "Being customer focused", "Being open and accountable", "Acting fairly and proportionately", "Putting things right" and "Seeking continuous improvement". In March 2007, the Principles of Good Administration were published, being welcomed by the Cabinet Secretary Sir Gus O'Donnell. The Cabinet Office had already stated that the Principles "represent common sense and good practice and that they are written in a way which staff will find relevant and helpful to their work". Abraham declared in June 2008 that the Principles were consistent with the original intention of the establishment of the Office – to "humanise the bureaucracy of the state". She followed up the publication of the Principles of Good Administration with the Principles for Remedy in October 2007, announcing that they would help public bodies "to have to hand the tools to put things right themselves". The Principles of Good Complaint Handling were published in November 2008 as guidance to help public authorities resolve complaints before they reached the Office. All three sets of Principles were published as a trilogy in February 2009 as the Ombudsman's Principles, encapsulating the case experience of the Office since its establishment in 1967.

=== A Debt of Honour and Defending the Indefensible ===
Abraham investigated complaints made by British groups who had been interned by the Japanese during the Second World War. They complained about a compensation scheme established by the Government in 2000 in which £10,000 would be offered to surviving members of groups who had been held prisoner. The Defence Minister, Dr Lewis Moonie, announced that "British groups", "British citizens" and "UK citizens" would be eligible for compensation. The clarification of this requirement was that a claimant had to have been born in the United Kingdom or had a parent or grandparent born in the United Kingdom – the "bloodlink". Complaints were made by many who considered themselves British who could not meet the criteria, including the political scientist Professor Jack Hayward, born in Shanghai to a father born in India and a mother born in Iraq. Abraham published her report – A Debt of Honour (after a phrase used by Dr Moonie) – in July 2005. She found four instances of maladministration: the scheme was devised hurriedly and with a lack of clarity about eligibility; that the announcement of the scheme was so imprecise as to give rise to confusion; that there was a failure to ensure that the "bloodlink" requirement would not lead to unequal treatment; and that there was a failure to inform applicants about the "bloodlink2 clarification when they were sent an eligibility questionnaire. The report recommended that the scheme be reviewed so that it would not operate in a way that would unequally treat Hayward and others in a similar situation. The report was published under s10(3) as the Government only partially accepted the recommendations but refused to accept that there had been inequality of treatment or to review the scheme. The Select Committee published its own report on the matter, endorsing the recommendations of Abraham, in January 2006. In March 2006 the Ministry of Defence announced that it had made changes to the eligibility criteria, abandoning the "bloodlink" requirement and paving the way for Hayward and others to become eligible for compensation.

A postscript to the affair was provided by the "injury to feelings" scheme announced by the Government in June 2007 in which claimants could apply for compensation for the discrimination they had suffered under the original scheme as a result of the "bloodlink" criterion. £4,000 was offered to anyone who applied for the scheme and was rejected on the "bloodlink" grounds. Complaints were received by the Office that the Ministry of Defence had rejected claims under this scheme as well. In one instance, an anonymous claimant who had been born in British Malaya and interned in Singapore was told that a previous apology and payment had been given to them in error. Abraham issued a report in September 2011, Defending the Indefensible, which condemned the actions of the Ministry of Defence as "extraordinarily insensitive", "disgraceful and unfair" and "unforgivable". She added that it was "the worst example I have seen in nearly nine years... of a government department getting things wrong and then repeatedly failing to put things right or learn from its mistakes". The Government admitted the failings of the Ministry of Defence and paid additional compensation to those who had suffered distress. In conclusion, the Minister for Veterans, Andrew Robathan, stated: "I hope an injustice has now been fairly rectified."

=== Other reports ===
Abraham published other notable reports while serving as Ombudsman. In October 2005, she issued Redress in the Round alongside the Local Government Ombudsman, concluding a lengthy saga between the complainants, Mr and Mrs Balchin, Norfolk County Council and the Department of Transport concerning blight caused by a proposed bypass. After four reports and three judicial review cases, the matter was settled with the council and the department paying the complainants £200,000.

She also reported twice on the system of tax credits operated by HM Revenue & Customs (HMRC). In June 2005, she issued Tax credits: Putting Things Right, in which continuing problems with how the system was operated. It was observed that the system "appears unable to provide an immediate, responsive and appropriate service, particularly when things go wrong". A number of recommendations were made, but in October 2007, she reported on the subject again. In Tax credits: Getting it wrong, she observed that despite improvements by HMRC in its administration of tax credits, big improvements were still necessary. Complaints continued to be made about the design of the system, the failures in complaint handling and the unfair or unreasonable recovery of overpayments. Abraham observed the effects of this maladministration: "in such instances, the impact on those concerned, typically those on the very lowest incomes who are the most vulnerable in society, is huge and highly distressing".

In February 2011, a report was published into NHS care for the elderly. In Care and compassion? she highlighted how ten elderly patients suffered pain, indignity and distress while being cared for by the NHS. There were failures in pain control, discharge arrangements, communication with patients and their relatives and ensuring adequate nutrition. Abraham commented that the "harrowing accounts should cause every member of NHS staff who reads this report to pause and ask themselves if any of their patients could suffer in the same way". She warned that "the NHS must close the gap between the promise of care and compassion outlined in its Constitution and the injustice that many older people experience".

== Recreation ==
Ann Abraham enjoys walking, gardening and football, being a supporter of Arsenal FC.

Government offices
Preceded by Sir Michael Buckley	Parliamentary Commissioner for Administration; 2002–2011	Succeeded by Dame Julie Mellor
Preceded by Sir Michael Buckley	Health Service Commissioner for England; 2002–2011	Succeeded by Dame Julie Mellor
Preceded by Sir Michael Buckley	Health Service Commissioner for Wales; 2002–2003	Succeeded by Adam Peat
