= Barlow Clowes =

British company; collapsed in accounting scandal

Barlow Clowes International Ltd was a British company, whose fraud and collapse caused an accounting scandal in 1988.

The collapse led to a number of important cases for English trusts law and UK company law, including Barlow Clowes International Ltd v Vaughan and Barlow Clowes International Ltd v Eurotrust International Ltd.

== History ==
Around 18,000 customers invested their money with Barlow Clowes on the recommendation of intermediaries. The company was established as a 'bond-washing' operation, in which gilt-edged Government bonds were purchased and sold in order to create tax advantages. Investors believed that their money had been invested risk-free. However, much of the money was diverted to fund the extravagant lifestyle of the company's co-founder, Peter Clowes.

After increasing concern about the operations of Barlow Clowes, the Department of Trade and Industry launched an investigation. On the strength of the evidence uncovered, Barlow Clowes was wound up by the High Court in May 1988, owing £190 million. Many of the victims were retired people who had lost the entirety of their life savings and now faced hardship or poverty. Peter Clowes was ultimately convicted of theft and sentenced to imprisonment for 10 years.

The press reported that the department, as the licensing authority, had ignored warnings about Barlow Clowes from both the company's competitors and from reputable sources in the City. It was alleged that the department knew as early as 1984 that Barlow Clowes was trading without a licence, that it gave the company a licence in 1985, and renewed it in both 1986 and 1987. The Secretary of State for Trade and Industry, Lord Young sought to defuse the matter in June 1988 by appointing Sir Godfray Le Quesne QC to hold an independent inquiry to determine the facts of what happened within the department. The Le Quesne report was published in October 1988.

Young announced that the department had acted reasonably in the circumstances and that the Government had no liability to the investors. Backbench MPs from all sides of the House voiced their anger and dismay at the attitude of the Government and the narrowness of the Le Quesne report's terms of reference. Twelve MPs referred the matter to the Parliamentary and Health Service Ombudsman.

Anthony Barrowclough conducted an investigation into the actions of the Department of Trade and Industry in licensing the Barlow Clowes group of companies. He established a unit dedicated to cope with the demands of the case. Barrowclough published his 170-page, 120,000-word report in December 1989. It identified irregularities in the affairs of Barlow Clowes which dated back to the 1970s and concluded that the department had committed five acts of maladministration.

It was concluded that if departmental officials had examined the affairs of the business properly in 1985 on the basis of the warnings the department had received, it was a "virtual certainty" that they would have closed Barlow Clowes down. The Report stated that it was "the most complex, wide-ranging and onerous investigation" ever undertaken by the Office. The case attracted unprecedented press and Parliamentary attention - the Treasury employed a team into the 1990s pursuing debts and responding to enquiries from MPs.

Nicholas Ridley, who had replaced Young as Secretary of State, rejected the main thrust of Barrowclough's findings and claimed that departmental officials had acted correctly on external advice. Nevertheless, Ridley reversed the position that the Government would not bailout investors, announcing a compensation package that would guarantee investors of less than £50,000 a 90% refund. In all, the Government agreed to pay £153 million to investors, of which it subsequently recouped £120 million from pursuing claims against the companies.

Ridley added the caveat that the payment of compensation was purely "because of the recommendation of the Parliamentary Commissioner", although it has been alleged that the compensation was only paid because a significant proportion of the investors were Conservative voters.

== See also ==
- English trusts law
- UK company law
