= William Reid (civil servant) =

Scottish civil servant (born 1931)

Sir William Reid KCB

Parliamentary Commissioner for Administration; Health Service Commissioner for England; Health Service Commissioner for Scotland; Health Service Commissioner for Wales
- In office 1 January 1990 – 31 December 1996
- Preceded by: Sir Anthony Barrowclough
- Succeeded by: Sir Michael Buckley

Personal details
- Born: 15 February 1931 (age 95) Aberdeen, Aberdeenshire, Scotland
- Spouse: Ann Campbell
- Education: University of Edinburgh Trinity College, Cambridge

Military service
- Branch/service: British Army (national service)

Sir William Kennedy Reid KCB (born 15 February 1931) is a retired civil servant who was Parliamentary Commissioner for Administration and Health Service Commissioner for England, Scotland and Wales (Parliamentary and Health Service Ombudsman) between 1990 and 1996.

Reid was born in Aberdeen in 1931 and was educated at Robert Gordon's College and George Watson's College. He studied at Edinburgh University and Trinity College, Cambridge, where he achieved first-class honours in Classics.

Between 1952 and 1954, Reid did national service in the British Army before joining the Ministry of Education in 1956. He moved to the Cabinet Office in 1964 and served as Secretary to the Cabinet Secretary, Sir Burke Trend. During this time, Reid played a modest role in helping to develop the Office of Parliamentary Ombudsman.

In 1967, he became secretary of the Council for Scientific Policy in the Department of Education and Science, becoming Under Secretary in 1974 and then Accountant-General in 1976. Reid moved to the Scottish Office in 1978 as Deputy Secretary of Central Services and then Secretary of the Scottish Home and Health Department between 1984 and 1990.

He was Chairman of Governors of the Scottish Police College between 1984 and 1990. Reid received an Honorary Doctorate from [Aberdeen University in 1996, from Reading University in 1998 and from Napier University in 1998.

== Ombudsman ==
=== Parliamentary investigations ===
In 1990, Reid was the first civil servant to be appointed to the post of Ombudsman since Sir Idwal Pugh. He came to the Office when it was flushed with the success of the Barlow Clowes investigation, which crowned an otherwise quiet decade in which fewer MPs were referring cases. Reid oversaw a dramatic upswing in caseload during his tenure - from 704 complaints in 1990 to 1,920 in 1996, the largest annual total in the history of the Office. Yet the Office did not keep up with this growth, and the number of outstanding cases grew considerably. The remit of the Ombudsman extended appreciably, to incorporate administrative actions of persons appointed by the Lord Chancellor as a member of court administrative staff. The Office also had numerous tribunals brought within its jurisdiction, as well as bodies such as the National Lottery, the Coal Authority, The Environment Agency and the Rail Regulator.

Reid chose to expand on the meaning of the term maladministration, a term given no definition in the Parliamentary Commissioner Act 1967 in his annual report of 1993. He observed that 'to define maladministration is to limit it' and extended the 'Crossman catalogue' (as set out in 1966) to include

'rudeness; an unwillingness to treat an individual as a person with rights; a refusal to answer reasonable questions; neglecting to inform an individual on request of his or her rights or entitlement; knowingly giving advice which is misleading or inadequate; ignoring valid advice or overruling considerations which would produce an uncomfortable result for the person overruling; offering no redress or manifestly disproportionate redress; showing bias whether because of colour, sex, or any other grounds; an omission to notify those who thereby lost a right of appeal; a refusal to inform adequately of the right of appeal; faulty procedures; the failure to monitor compliance with adequate procedures; cavalier disregard of guidance which was intended to be followed in the interest of the equitable treatment of those who use a service; partiality; and failure to mitigate the effects of rigid adherence to the letter of the law where that produces manifestly inequitable treatment.'

Reid's addendum made apparent his belief that maladministration should be interpreted very broadly and that it should not be interpreted in a way that disadvantaged the complainant.

Some notable cases were investigation during Reid's time as Ombudsman. A widely publicised statement by the Parliamentary Under Secretary for Health, Edwina Currie, that "most of the egg production" of the country was "sadly... infected with Salmonella" sparked a collapse in the price of eggs and confidence crisis in the industry in December 1988. The Government introduced a compensation scheme and a farmer complained that the Ministry of Agriculture, Fisheries and Food (MAFF) had changed the basis of awarding compensation after giving him what he regarded as an unsatisfactory amount. Reid found that MAFF had not made its decisions on the basis of evidence, had been evasive when questioned about the basis on which compensation was determined and had unreasonably concluded that the complainant's case was closed. In consequence, MAFF apologised and agreed to pay compensation to the complainant.

Reid received many complaints of maladministration by the Child Support Agency, which had been set up in 1993 to assess, collect and enforce child support maintenance. Such was the volume of complaints that Reid took the unprecedented step of not investigating individual complaints unless they involved an aspect of the Agency's work which was previously unknown or involved actual financial loss. Reid uncovered a litany of administrative woes when he reported in 1995: 'mistaken identity, inadequate procedures, failure to answer correspondence, incorrect or misleading advice, delay in the assessment and review of child support maintenance, and in its payment to the parent with care'. Complaints about the Agency continued to reach the Office, making up a third of all cases admitted for investigation. Reid reported again in March 1996, finding that shortcomings continued to occur. The Select Committee criticised the Agency for failing to heed the advice of Reid's reports.

It was necessary for Reid to lay a report under s10(3) Parliamentary Commissioner Act 1967 when the Government refused to accept his findings in respect of complaints about blight caused by the construction of the Channel Tunnel Rail Link. Residents in Kent complained that the handling of the project by the Department of Transport had caused the value of their properties to depreciate to the extent that they could not sell them.

In February 1995, Reid issued his report, finding that the Department had maladministered in not considering the effects of its policy on those affected by it. Reid commented that the project had been kept in limbo, increasing uncertainty and blight. The Government did not accept the findings but after the Select Committee intervened on the side of the Ombudsman, it decided to reconsider whether to establish a compensation scheme 'out of respect for the PCA Select Committee and the office of the Parliamentary Commissioner'. Nevertheless, the Government refused to admit fault or liability and ultimately, 28 applicants received £10,000 in compensation.

=== Health investigations ===
Reid was Health Service Ombudsman at a time of significant organisational change for the National Health Service on the basis of the internal market principles introduced by the Government. After 1994, the work of the Office under Reid was dominated by the decision of the Government to establish a unified complaints system for the National Health Service and to extend the jurisdiction of the Ombudsman to encompass matters of clinical judgment.

Successive Ombudsmen had expressed misgivings that such a large proportion of complaints received about health authorities concerned clinical judgment. Although there was often a thin line between clinical and administrative decisions, Reid undertook to press his jurisdiction as far as he could. In 1993, the Wilson Committee recommended that the Government carefully examine whether the Ombudsman ought to consider complaints about clinical judgment. In 1995, the Government published its proposals which incorporated the suggestion of the Wilson report. The subsequent Health Service Commissioners (Amendment) Act 1996 which enabled the Ombudsman to investigate clinical judgment received all-party support. Reid oversaw the Office's adaptation to the new legislation. The task was complicated considerably by its unpredictable effects on caseload. 'Precise figures for extra workload arising from my wider jurisdiction' observed Reid, 'are impossible to predict'. Reid also undertook to recruit and train the additional staff necessary to cope with the increased workload and extended remit. Reid laid down that the Office's clinical advisers would be expected to have due regard to all professional guidance in determining what a reasonable and responsible clinical decision and reach their conclusions on the balance of probabilities. When Reid departed the Office, it was well placed to handle the dramatically increasing workload which would soon be dominated by matters of clinical judgment.

Reid also undertook an investigation of the complaints handling system of the Salford Royal Hospitals Trust. Reid described Salford as 'useful peg' on which a whole report about the NHS could be hung upon. An unprecedented number of complaints had been received about Salford. Reid concluded damningly that 'Incoming and outgoing letters went astray. Doctors did not always respond to requests... as quickly as they should have done. It took too long to reply to complaints... no real thought appeared to have been given to measures which might improve service and reduce the pressure on staff'. The Select Committee recommended that Reid's report be used throughout the NHS for the training of new staff in the complaints procedure.

=== Overview ===
Although the period of Reid's tenure as Health Service Ombudsman was one in which there was enormous changes within the National Health Service (what Reid called 'a state of flux'), it has been observed that 'the Office came through the state of flux and emerged not only intact but significantly strengthened'.

Reid's elaboration on the meaning of maladministration served to remind public authorities that the interpretation of the term would not be to the disadvantage of the complainant and that the Office expected the highest standards of public administration. He cultivated relationships with ombudsmen overseas, becoming a director of the International Ombudsman Institute between 1992 and 1996.

== Post-Ombudsman ==
Following his service as Ombudsman, Reid was appointed Chairman of the Mental Welfare Commission for Scotland in 1997. He was also appointed Chairman of the Advisory Committee on Distinction Awards for doctors and dentists. He served in both roles until 2000.

Reid's book, Resolving complaints and promoting openness: Can the ombudsman help?, was published in 1998.

Reid was Sydenham Lecturer of the Worshipful Society of Apothecaries of London in 1994, the Crookshank Lecturer of the Royal College of Radiologists in 1994 and the John Hunt Lecturer of the Royal College of General Practitioners in 1996.

Classical and modern languages, verse and hillwalking are among his leisure pursuits. He is a Fellow of the Royal Society of Edinburgh, a Fellow of the Royal College of Physicians of Edinburgh and an honorary Fellow of the Royal College of Surgeons of Edinburgh.

Government offices
Preceded by Sir Anthony Barrowclough	Parliamentary Commissioner for Administration; 1990–1996	Succeeded by Sir Michael Buckley
Preceded by Sir Anthony Barrowclough	Health Service Commissioner for England; 1990–1996	Succeeded by Sir Michael Buckley
Preceded by Sir Anthony Barrowclough	Health Service Commissioner for Scotland; 1990–1996	Succeeded by Sir Michael Buckley
Preceded by Sir Anthony Barrowclough	Health Service Commissioner for Wales; 1990–1996	Succeeded by Sir Michael Buckley
