= United Kingdom education law =

Laws that govern schools and higher education

Education law in the United Kingdom is the body of law that governs schools and higher education.

== History ==
Historically, the exercise of power by schools and other educational institutions was regarded as largely one of broad discretion and expertise, with the courts generally refusing to recognise the existence or enforcement of legal rights by aggrieved students against teachers and their institutions. Today, a body of legislation and judicial precedent has emerged that allows for judicial review of educational institutions, which include the Human Rights Act 1998 and the United Nations Convention on the Rights of the Child.

== Administrative law ==
The ordinary principles of judicial review, such as standing, apply to cases concerning educational institutions.

== Higher education ==
A body of administrative law has emerged from judicial review litigation brought by students against higher education institutions. Higher education institutions are regarded in judicial review claims either as purely public authorities or as hybrid ones, which exercise both public and private power. At the same time, all relationships between students and higher education institutions are governed by the contract that exists between them, such that remedies may be brought against institutions in contract claims, rather than in judicial review. This allows student litigants to be protected under the Consumer Rights Act 2015, whilst at the same time requiring contractual interpretation of higher-education relationships to be done with reference to public law principles.

=== Ombudsman ===
The Office of Independent Adjudicator for Higher Education (OIA) is the designated complaints body for students in higher education as designated by the Secretary of State for Education as authorised to do so under legislation. The OIA has wide discretion in reviewing the complaints of students, with the courts generally being slow to question the decisions of the OIA. The courts have also applied the general principle that judicial review is a means of last resort to higher education cases, such that direct judicial review of higher education disputes will not be entertained where a complaint to the OIA is available and has not been pursued.

The OIA has been criticised for its low rate of upholding student complaints, with roughly 4% of complaints being upheld as 'justified'.

=== Internal proceedings ===
Internal proceedings brought against students in response to academic, disciplinary, and fitness-to-practice concerns must follow the general public law principles of proportionality and natural justice, which include the right to be heard and the right to a fair hearing.
