= Independent Adjudicator =

An independent adjudicator is an authorized judge in the United Kingdom who has the power to make binding decisions in a particular field. The mechanism is designed to represent the interests of groups which would otherwise have gone unrepresented, such as students with a complaint against their university.

In recent years the use of independent adjudicators in British TV game shows has been increasingly popular. The phrase was first used on a regular basis by Noel Edmonds in the Endemol show Deal or No Deal in which the independent adjudicator is 'the only person who knows where the money is'. Increasingly, on other game shows, the independent adjudicator is used to carry out random draws where the order of play might have implications for the contestants. They are also used to oversee interpretation of rules and contestant complaints.

Shows where the independent adjudicator has made an on-screen appearance include Deal or No Deal, Red or Black? Series 1 and Child Genius, Channel 4.

Comedian Catherine Tate filmed a comedy sketch in the Deal or No Deal studio and is referred to as the independent adjudicator.

- Office of the Independent Adjudicator (for Higher Education in England and Wales)
- The Office of the independent Adjudicator for the Contract Rights Renewal (CRR)
- Beyond Dispute Independent Adjudicators
