= Mary Marre =

British voluntary worker and public servant

- Born: Romola Mary Gilling; 25 April 1920; Chelmsford
- Died: 6 March 2005 (aged 84); St Andrews
- Education: Chelmsford County High School for Girls before studying at Bedford College
- Known for: the Marre Committee to the Courts and Legal Services Act in 1990
- Spouse: Alan Marre
- Children: two

Mary, Lady Marre born (Romola) Mary Gilling (25 April 1920 – 6 March 2005) was a British voluntary worker and public servant. She led the Marre Committee which investigated the future of the law profession. Its acrimonious conclusions resulted in the Courts and Legal Services Act in 1990.

== Life ==
Marre was born in Chelmsford. Her parents were Romola Marjorie (born Angier) and Aubrey John Gilling. She was the first of their four children. Her father managed a bank. She went to Chelmsford County High School for Girls before studying at Bedford College.

She worked for a short time at the Ministry of Health before she joined the Auxiliary Territorial Service in 1942. She married on Christmas Eve 1943 and she would volunteer for work over the next few years whilst she and Alan Marre had children. She took the lead when she started to manage the West Hampstead Citizens' Advice Bureau in 1962. In 1974 she took on the chair of the London Council of Social Service and she held that role for ten years. During that time the organisation was renamed the London Voluntary Service Council.

A public debate about the role of solicitors created a joint committee between the Law Society and the Bar was formed to discuss the future of the legal profession. The committee was established in April 1986 and made its report in July 1988. The committee had not arrived at a unanimous conclusion—with the solicitor members and six of the seven independent members recommending the extension of solicitors' rights of audience to the Crown Court, with the Bar representatives and one independent member disagreeing and attaching a Note of Dissent to the final report that undermined its conclusions. However the group was known as the Marre Committee whose majority conclusion A Time For Change resulted in the Courts and Legal Services Act in 1990.

Marre died in St Andrews in 2005 from heart disease.

== Private life ==
She married Alan Marre who she met whilst they were both working at the Ministry of Health. They would gave two children a son and a daughter. He would in time become the Ombudsman. After he died in 1990 from cancer she and retired judge Alan Lipfriend lived together until he died in 1996.

== Sources ==
- Merricks, Walter; Russell Wallman (1990). The Courts and Legal Services Act—A Solicitor's Guide. London: The Law Society. ISBN 1-85328-053-4.
- White, Robin (1991). A Guide to the Courts and Legal Services Act 1990. London: Fourmat Publishing. ISBN 1-85190-120-5.
