= Cecil Clothier =

English jurist and ombudsman

Sir Cecil Clothier KCB QC

Parliamentary Commissioner for Administration; Health Service Commissioner for England; Health Service Commissioner for Scotland; Health Service Commissioner for Wales
- In office 3 January 1979 – 31 December 1984
- Preceded by: Sir Idwal Pugh
- Succeeded by: Sir Anthony Barrowclough

Personal details
- Born: 28 August 1919 Liverpool
- Died: 8 May 2010 (aged 90) London
- Spouse: (1) Elizabeth Bush (d. 1984) (2) Diana Stevenson
- Education: Lincoln College, Oxford
- Nickname: Spike

Military service
- Branch/service: British Army • 51st (Highland) Division
- Rank: Lieutenant-Colonel
- Battles/wars: Second World War • Second Battle of El Alamein • Invasion of Sicily

Sir Cecil Montacute "Spike" Clothier KCB QC (28 August 1919 – 8 May 2010) was a lawyer who served as a Judge of Appeal on the Isle of Man, and then as Parliamentary Commissioner for Administration and Health Service Commissioner for England, Scotland and Wales (Parliamentary and Health Service Ombudsman). He was later the first Chairman of the Police Complaints Authority.

== Early life and army service ==
Clothier was born in 1919 in Liverpool to a devout Catholic family. He was educated at Stonyhurst College and won a senior history scholarship to read law at Lincoln College, Oxford. The outbreak of the Second World War cut short his studies and he refused to apply for a post in the Judge Advocate General's office in 1939. This led to a twenty-year-long rift with his father, a dentist who had seen dreadful jaw injuries during the First World War. Clothier joined the Royal Signals and served with the 51st (Highland) Division at the Second Battle of El Alamein, where he was responsible for laying communication lines and setting up radio equipment. He undertook deception duties in a radio truck and made transmissions from unmanned positions in English and Scottish accents to confuse the enemy. He discovered that the greatest danger came from enemy aircraft and from a lack of sleep, instanced by an occasion when he woke to discover that he was riding his motorcycle down an embankment into a minefield. Clothier acquired the nickname 'Spike' after a film character. He became a popular pianist in the officers' mess and acquired a love of flying when an American pilot offered a flight and landed on a road by a Sicilian village where they had an impromptu swim. In 1943 Clothier was transferred to Washington, D.C. where he served as a staff officer, sitting on committees dealing with technical developments and radio-frequency allocation. He continued his passion for flying by qualifying as a pilot. He also encountered the actress Mae West who was so impressed with Clothier that she said she would send her son to Oxford University to learn to speak like him. Clothier developed a lasting love of the United States during his time in Washington, D.C. When Clothier left the Army in 1946, he had reached the rank of lieutenant-colonel.

== Law ==
Clothier returned to Oxford to complete his studies and graduated with an MA law degree. He worked for Ferranti on transformers while reading for the Bar in his spare time. Passing his exams, he applied for Inner Temple but was turned down because he was 'in trade'. An uncle, a Bencher and former Treasurer of Inner Temple, helped reverse the decision and Clothier was called to the Bar in 1950.

Clothier started his career as a barrister in Liverpool. In his first case, Clothier defended a man with 73 previous convictions accused of throwing a brick through a shop window. Clothier made his name as a skilful industrial accident lawyer. However, with his command of technical details, he widened his practice to personal injury, professional negligence and commercial work, including corporate crime. Clothier acquired a speciality in cases that involved adverse reactions to drugs – he advised ICI over reparations for patients who had suffered side-effects from taking Eraldin and recommended that it create a scheme of full compensation.

In 1965, Clothier took silk and was also appointed recorder of Blackpool. When the courts were reorganised, Clothier was appointed a deputy Crown Court judge, serving until 1978. In 1972, Clothier was appointed a Judge of Appeal on the Isle of Man and served until 1978. When serving on the bench, Clothier was a legal assessor to the General Medical and Dental councils and a member of the Royal Commission on National Health.

== Ombudsman ==
Clothier became the first Parliamentary and Health Service Ombudsman not to come from a civil service background when he was appointed in 1978. Clothier expressed himself to be happy with the Office that he inherited from Sir Idwal Pugh: 'coming to my task without previous close experience with the work of either Parliament or the Executive, I have been much impressed by both'. Clothier did not seek to alter the Office, but to develop it along the lines laid out by his predecessors. After a drop in the number of complaints received, the Office handled 1,031 in 1980, the fourth highest since the Office opened in 1967. Clothier continued the practice of arousing public awareness of the Office, eagerly accepting invitations to talk to groups in different parts of the country and determined that people should regard the Ombudsman as fundamental feature of the constitution. 'The last thing an Ombudsman wants to be' observed Clothier, 'is distant, cold and inaccessible'. Yet it was also important not to 'incite [the public] to grumble about nothing in particular'. In the first statutory extension of the Ombudsman's remit since 1967, the Office was permitted to investigate the actions of consular staff abroad in their duties towards United Kingdom citizens. Clothier also considered that in instances where it was questionable whether an investigation should be undertaken or not, that he would lean in favour of the complainant. Even so, if the complainant was unable to produce prima facie evidence of maladministration, Clothier was bound to reject the complaint.

=== Parliamentary investigations ===
Occasional reports were issued under s10(4) Parliamentary Commissioner Act 1967 alongside the regularly quarterly and annual reports. An important report concerned the illegal occupation of Government land in Worcestershire by forty gypsy families in 1978. They were joined by families of Irish travellers and serious damage to Government-owned buildings occurred. Two farmers complained to have been affected by this, and their complaints were referred to Clothier. He found that the Government was not to blame for the original occupation and that the decision to refrain from eviction had been reasonable in the circumstances. He nevertheless found that officials were unable to make a decision to bring the situation under control, that Ministers were not brought into consultation at an early enough stage and that it took too long for an agreement to be reached on the decision to be taken. Clothier was therefore able to attribute part of the losses incurred by the farmers to maladministration and considered it appropriate for the departments concerned to offer ex gratia compensation.

Another significant case was that of John Preece, who complained of a four-year delay by the Home Office and the Scottish Home and Health Department in reviewing his conviction for murder following the suspension from duty of the forensic scientist who had been an expert witness at his trial. Clothier observed that, although it was not the duty of the Home Office to actively look for miscarriages of justice, the circumstances of the case made the matter wholly exceptional. Clothier concluded that a miscarriage of justice where a person loses his or her liberty was 'one of the gravest matters which can occupy the attention of a civilised society'. An exceptional effort was necessary to remedy the consequences of what he described as a 'pollution of justice at its source'. Clothier noted sadly that when the Home Office became aware of shortcomings which 'struck at the very roots of justice' it did not act with the urgency that was required. The Select Committee reinforced the conclusions of Clothier, summing up the affair as 'a sorry saga'. Mr Preece, having already had his conviction quashed, received £77,000 in compensation. The Home Office identified a further 129 cases that required re-examination, 16 of which were sent to the Court of Appeal for re-consideration.

=== Health investigations ===
Clothier found that a greater number of people were becoming aware with the existence of the Office and its functions as a Health Service Ombudsman. However, such awareness was also accompanied by misconception about what the Ombudsman did. New publicity material was issued by the Office and the Local Government Ombudsman in 1981 which sought to explain the differences between the Parliamentary and Health Service functions exercised by the Office and the jurisdiction over local authorities exercised by the Local Government Ombudsman. Film presentations of the functions of the Office were also produced for use in schools and libraries. Clothier found it problematic that some half of all complaints he received related wholly or partly to actions arising from the exercise of clinical judgment, a matter on which he was not empowered to investigate. Clothier commented that it was 'a source of some embarrassment when I have to send rejection letters to complainants explaining this particular jurisdictional exclusion. Many find it very difficult indeed to understand or accept it.' There was continued opposition from the medical profession to the extension of the Ombudsman's jurisdiction to encompass matters of clinical judgment. Throughout Clothier's tenure as Ombudsman, the question continued to be wrestled over by the Select Committee and the Joint Consultants' Committee without significant inroads being made into the medical profession's opposition. All the while, the number of complaints received by the Ombudsman increased: from 562 in 1979–80 to 895 in 1983–84.

Clothier dealt with notable cases during his time as Health Service Ombudsman. When a health authority found that a bogus doctor had operated on a number of patients it decided not to inform them that their operations had been performed by the 'doctor'. A complaint was made by the Patients' Association, however Clothier did not investigate on the grounds that there was no evidence that the Association was asked to complain on by any aggrieved individuals. Clothier also handled a case in which a local councillor had received an anonymous leaflet supporting fluoridation of water. It transpired, after four months, that the leaflet had emanated from the local health authority. Clothier concluded that the authorship of the leaflet should have been disclosed without delay. He understood that the councillor 'wished to know what Jove-like hand' had sent the leaflet. His verdict on the leaflet itself was damning. It was 'a very poor production and far below the standard I would expect an Authority to achieve in communication with the public'. The shame at producing the 'hopeless' leaflet did 'not excuse the subsequent administrative ineptitudes, to which only Franz Kafka could do justice. The whole episode has been a very great waste of my time and everyone else's'. One of the most serious cases investigated by Clothier concerned a complaint from a mother that her baby was born dead due to a catalogue of failures in maternity care at the hospital. Clothier decided for the first time since the establishment of the Office to hold a formal hearing and take evidence on oath. Clothier concluded that the midwives who gave evidence were untruthful. The complainant was 'shamefully neglected at her time of need' and that records of routine checks had been falsified. Clothier concluded that it was 'difficult to imagine a more serious failure in the service' as the health authority admitted that the baby could have survived if reasonable care had been given to the mother.

=== Overview ===
Clothier left the office in 1984, regretful that he was alone among national ombudsmen in the world in not having powers to investigate on his own initiative and that his jurisdiction was limited to not investigating personnel and contractual matters. He also had doubts about the requirement that complaints reach the office through members of Parliament and considered the viability of a mechanism where complainants could contact the Office directly if they were dissatisfied with the progress made by the Member of Parliament in attending to the grievance. Nevertheless, Clothier had been an effective Ombudsman: 'a man of achievement and integrity; he liked to get things done and was unafraid to upset people en route.' He had worked to enhance public awareness of the Office and appeared in one cartoon as Superman. It had been important to Clothier 'to give the citizen a leg up against what must seem to him to be the impenetrable vastness of Whitehall'. And although he was criticised for the slowness of his investigations, he retorted that "my investigative powers are as good as you'll get in a democracy – the next best thing to the rack."

== Police complaints ==
In 1985 Clothier was appointed to chair the Police Complaints Authority, commanding a dignified office in Whitehall and bringing it under the authority of the Home Affairs Select Committee. His term as Chairman of the Authority was a turbulent one, and he often earned the hostility of both the complainants and the police.

He noted that the Metropolitan Police received more complaints than any other force in the country and that it was also least inclined to co-operate with the Authority. Clothier sought to improve transparency and pressed for powers to dismiss unsuitable officers and to prevent officers under investigation from being able to resign with a full pension on health grounds. Revelations of miscarriages of justice caused anger, and the Police Federation passed votes of no-confidence in the Authority and himself as chairman on four occasions. Clothier reflected that he 'would be a lot more worried if they passed a vote of confidence. It might suggest that some of the accusations that we work hand in glove with the police are true.' Clothier was indeed accused of working hand in glove with the police. When the police used, as Clothier admitted, excessive force to break up a hippy peace convoy near Stonehenge, he did not recommend that a single disciplinary charge be brought against the 1,363 officers involved. When the police forcibly broke up a student demonstration in Manchester in 1985 and 100 complaints were received, officers were not required by the Authority to name colleagues who had behaved improperly. Clothier commented that 'failure to denounce one's friends and relations has never been a subject for discipline in any civilised body of people'.

Clothier followed his term at the Police Complaints Authority with appointments to the Senior Salaries Review Body from 1989 to 1995, as Vice-President of the Interception of Communications Tribunal between 1986 and 1996 and Chairman of the Committee on Ethics of Gene Therapy between 1990 and 1992. He also chaired two commissions on the governance of Jersey, one concerning policing and other concerning the constitution.

== Allitt Inquiry ==
In 1994 at the age of 74, Clothier was appointed to head an inquiry into how a nurse, Beverley Allitt, who was later diagnosed as an untreatable psychopath, was able to kill four children and attack nine others at Grantham and Kesteven Hospital. Clothier trenchantly refused to hold a public inquiry, earning him vociferous hostility from both the victims' families and widespread criticism from the media. Clothier reasoned that people were capable of telling blatant lies under oath. In the absence of friends, colleagues, parents and the press, witnesses could speak with "a frankness which can be startling". Clothier continued that "if you really want to know what people are thinking in an extremely delicate matter, you need to see them in circumstances when they do not feel threatened." Clothier was asked about the similar case of Dr Harold Shipman in 2000 and explained that few people could be found to criticise colleagues with whom they had to work the next day, let alone voice suspicions about them committing very grave crimes. "Most witnesses at a public inquiry say as little as possible and do their best to withhold their innermost thoughts", Clothier remarked. "At an inquiry held in private people gradually relax and unburden themselves of a truth which may have been tormenting them for years."

== Machinery of Government review in Jersey ==
In 1999-2000, Clothier chaired a panel set up by the States Assembly to ‘undertake a review into all aspects of the machinery of government in Jersey’. This recommended radical changes, including the introduction of ministerial government, abolition of the Bailiff’s role as president of the States Assembly, and an ombudsman. Only the first of these reforms was accepted.

== Retirement and personal life ==
Clothier gradually became detached from public affairs, although he did occasionally write letters to newspapers. To the Daily Telegraph he criticised the phrase 'shoot-to-kill' on the basis that implied that it was possible to 'shoot-to-wing', an idea only applicable to the Wild West.

Medicine was important to Clothier both professionally and personally. He was elected an Honorary Anesthetist, Honorary Pharmacist and an Honorary Fellow of the Royal College of Physicians. He prefaced the third edition of The Oxford Textbook of Medicine, which became the first chapter of the fourth edition. The heart surgeon Sir Magdi Yacoub first operated on Clothier in 1976 and continued to care for him over many years. Clothier supported Harefield Hospital at which Yacoub practised and even occasionally acted as a theatre attendant. He drafted papers which saved the hospital from closure. New research laboratories at the hospital were opened in 2002 by Prince Michael of Kent and named in Clothier's honour.

Clothier retained a love of flying, taking up gliding after he gained his pilot's licence. He was also an enthusiastic sailor and enjoyed reading the novels of Joseph Conrad. Clothier's musical abilities ranged beyond playing the piano: he constructed a clavichord and a bentside spinet and played both. Clothier was fluent in French, Italian and also spoke German, making speeches in all three. When addressing a conference in Sweden during his time as Ombudsman, Clothier considered it polite to address the delegates in the hosts' language, purchased a textbook and then gave a five-minute speech in Swedish.

Clothier, who modestly remarked that he had "a second-class first-class brain", died in May 2010.

Government offices
Preceded by Sir Idwal Pugh	Parliamentary Commissioner for Administration; 1979–1984	Succeeded by Sir Anthony Barrowclough
Preceded by Sir Idwal Pugh	Health Service Commissioner for England; 1979–1984	Succeeded by Sir Anthony Barrowclough
Preceded by Sir Idwal Pugh	Health Service Commissioner for Scotland; 1979–1984	Succeeded by Sir Anthony Barrowclough
Preceded by Sir Idwal Pugh	Health Service Commissioner for Wales; 1979–1984	Succeeded by Sir Anthony Barrowclough
