= Alan Marre =

British civil servant (1914–1990)

Sir Alan Marre KCB

Parliamentary Commissioner for Administration
- In office 1 April 1971 – 31 March 1976
- Preceded by: Sir Edmund Compton
- Succeeded by: Sir Idwal Pugh

Health Service Commissioner for England
- In office 1 October 1973 – 31 March 1976
- Preceded by: New office
- Succeeded by: Sir Idwal Pugh

Health Service Commissioner for Scotland
- In office 1 October 1973 – 31 March 1976
- Preceded by: New office
- Succeeded by: Sir Idwal Pugh

Health Service Commissioner for Wales
- In office 1 October 1973 – 31 March 1976
- Preceded by: New office
- Succeeded by: Sir Idwal Pugh

Personal details
- Born: 25 February 1914
- Died: 20 March 1990 (aged 76)
- Spouse: (Romola) Mary Gilling (b. 1920 d. 2005)
- Education: Trinity Hall, Cambridge

Sir Alan Samuel Marre KCB (25 February 1914 – 20 March 1990) was a British Civil Servant, serving most notably as Parliamentary Commissioner for Administration and as the first Health Service Commissioner for England, Scotland and Wales.

Marre was the son of an immigrant tobacconist and was educated at St Olave's Grammar School in Orpington, Kent. He went to Trinity Hall, Cambridge where he achieved a double first.

He joined the Ministry of Health and was Assistant Principal in 1936. He became, in turn, Principal in 1941, Assistant Secretary in 1946 and then Under-Secretary between 1952 and 1963. Marre moved to the Ministry of Labour and served as Under-Secretary until 1964. He was appointed Deputy Secretary at the Ministry of Health, where he stayed until 1966 when he returned to the Ministry of Labour as Deputy Secretary. In 1968, Marre became the Second Permanent Under-Secretary of State and the Department of Health and Social Security.

During his time at the Ministry of Health, Marre met Mary Gilling, a philosophy graduate. They married and she became distinguished in her own right in both public and charitable life.

== Ombudsman ==
Marre succeeded Sir Edmund Compton as Parliamentary Ombudsman in 1971. He was confronted by a distinct lack of case work. The number of cases handled by the Office had fallen from 1,120 in 1968 to just 548 in 1971. Marre considered that it could be necessary to see if the Office could 'think of any new way of stimulating some publicity'. Marre determined to bring the work of the Office more fully into the public eye and made efforts to respond positively to requests from the press, radio and television for interviews and participation in programmes. Meetings of interested people were addressed by both Marre and his officers. Consequently, there was a growth in case work for the Office.

Marre made greater use of his powers under s10(4) Parliamentary Commissioner Act 1967 to issue special reports. Two instances where such powers were used were in the reports issued into complaints concerning overlapping television licences and the collapse of the Court Line group of companies.

Many complaints were made by people who had obtained television licences before the fee was due to be increased on 1 April 1975. The Home Office decided to offer the holders of such 'overlapping' licences a choice between paying the difference between the old and the new licence fee and having their new licences revoked after they had received their money's worth at the old rate. In his investigation, Marre did not feel entitled to question the merits of the decision reached by the Home Office, but did criticise the inefficiency and lack of foresight shown by the Home Office prior to the decision being made. The Home Office accepted Marre's findings and the Home Secretary, Roy Jenkins, expressed regret for the distress and confusion that had been caused. The report paved the way for a challenge in the Court of Appeal where it was held that the Home Office had acted unlawfully. The Home Office subsequently paid refunds to holders of overlapping licences who had already paid the difference in fees.

When the Court Line group collapsed in August 1974, complaints were made to the Ombudsman about statements made in the House of Commons by the Secretary of State for Industry, Tony Benn. Marre investigated whether the statements by Benn had misled holidaymakers about the safety of their bookings with Court Line when there were rumours that the company was imperilled. This was a reversal of the decision by Sir Edmund Compton in the earlier Duccio case that a ministerial statement was not an instance of administration open to investigation. Marre concluded carefully that in the absence of a qualification to the statements made, the statements were bound to leave a misleading impression with the public and that the Government could not be absolved of all responsibility for losses insured by holidaymakers. Supporters of the Government were critical of the report, arguing that Marre had exceeded his remit as Ombudsman by criticising 'policy' instead of 'administration'. The Government rejected Marre's findings and, in the subsequent debate, the House of Commons split on party lines. The Government won the debate, but the Office enhanced its credibility in demonstrating both its independence and its ability to criticise a Minister.

Marre was also appointed as the first Health Service Commissioner for England, Scotland and Wales when the National Health Service Reorganisation Act 1973 came into force. This followed pressure from within Parliament from those who had sought to include health matters within the remit of the Parliamentary Commissioner Act 1967 and from those members of the public who were dissatisfied with the existing complaints handling procedure. Marre assumed this new post in October 1973 and was empowered to investigate maladministration and service failures by hospitals. Matters of clinical judgment were noticeably outside his remit. Marre recruited a mixture of civil servants and medical staff for the new posts created for the Health Ombudsman. He also sought publicity for his new responsibilities but still observed that his functions were 'still not widely enough known and understood'. Marre instituted a two-stage procedure for health investigations: a screening stage and a subsequent stage where the Ombudsman would determine the form of the investigation. By the end of his tenure as Ombudsman, Marre had firmly established the Office as a fundamental feature of complaints about the National Health Service.

== Retirement ==
In retirement, Marre engaged in a number of charitable and public activities. He served as the Chairman of Age Concern England between 1977 and 1980 and of the British Nutritional Foundation between 1981 and 1990. He was also a trustee of the Whitechapel Art Gallery between 1977 and 1983. Although Marre had not been a practising Jew, he gave some of his time to Jewish social and cultural causes, becoming President of the Maccabaeans in 1982.

Sir Alan Marre died in 1990.

Government offices
Preceded by Sir Edmund Compton	Parliamentary Commissioner for Administration; 1971–1976	Succeeded by Sir Idwal Pugh
Preceded by New Office	Health Service Commissioner for England; 1973–1976	Succeeded by Sir Idwal Pugh
Preceded by New Office	Health Service Commissioner for Scotland; 1973–1976	Succeeded by Sir Idwal Pugh
Preceded by New Office	Health Service Commissioner for Wales; 1973–1976	Succeeded by Sir Idwal Pugh
