= Anthony Barrowclough =

English lawyer

Sir Anthony Barrowclough QC

Parliamentary Commissioner for Administration; Health Service Commissioner for England; Health Service Commissioner for Scotland; Health Service Commissioner for Wales
- In office 1 January 1985 – 31 December 1989
- Preceded by: Sir Cecil Clothier
- Succeeded by: Sir William Reid

Personal details
- Born: 24 June 1924 Nottinghamshire
- Died: 3 June 2003 (aged 78)
- Spouse: Mary Pery-Knox-Gore
- Education: New College, Oxford

Military service
- Branch/service: Royal Naval Volunteer Reserve
- Battles/wars: Second World War

Sir Anthony Richard Barrowclough QC (24 June 1924 – 3 June 2003) was a lawyer who served as Parliamentary Commissioner for Administration and Health Service Commissioner for England, Scotland and Wales (Parliamentary and Health Service Ombudsman).

== Early life ==
Barrowclough was born with his twin brother Jack in 1924 in Nottinghamshire, the son of Sidney Barrowclough, a farmer. The family later moved to Kent where Sidney became the proprietor of a dairy business in the outskirts of London. Barrowclough was educated at Stowe with his brother before he joined the Royal Naval Volunteer Reserve in 1943. He trained as a navigation officer and served on motor torpedo boats with coastal forces.

== Barrister ==
After the war, Barrowclough went to New College, Oxford where he took first class honours in law and was awarded a certificate of honour. In 1949, he was called to the Bar by Inner Temple and joined chambers at 7 King's Bench Walk. Barrowclough undertook a range of commercial work and specialised in aeronautical law, an area in which he lectured at Oxford.

Barrowclough became a part-time member of the Monopolies' Commission in 1966. When two high street menswear retailers, United Drapery Stores and Montague Burton, sought to merge in 1969, the Commission rejected the proposal. When Barrowclough dissented from this decision, he was effectively stood down from the Commission by the Chairman, Sir Ashton Roskill.

Between 1972 and 1984, Barrowclough served as a Crown Court recorder. He took silk in 1974, and became a Bencher of the Inner Temple in 1982.

== Ombudsman ==
Barrowclough was the second lawyer to be appointed to the post of Parliamentary and Health Service Ombudsman in 1985. There was a downward trend in the number of complaints received by the Office: from 759 in 1985 to 677 in 1989. The number of Members of Parliament using the services of the Office dropped from 373 in 1985 to 359 in 1989, the lowest since 1974. There was also a concurrent drop in reports, from 177 in 1985 to just 120 in 1989.

The Office became entangled with the Lord Chancellor's Department as to whether the administrative actions of the courts should be open to investigation. The Department refused to shift from its position that the administration work was in the exercise of the courts' function of administerting justice. By 1989, ten investigations against the Department were suspended because of its objections. Barrowclough's term as Ombudsman also witnessed the expansion of the Office's jurisdiction to encompass 50 non-departmental public bodies (quangos). However, few referrals were made about complaints against these bodies.

Although Barrowclough was no less busy than his predecessors in publicising the work of the Office, even with the extension of jurisdiction, the number of complaints received by the Office continued to drop. This raised questions about the way the Office was handling its caseload.

In July 1985, Robin Maxwell-Hyslop MP put down an Early Day Motion which was critical of the performance of the Ombudsman, describing the Office as 'unacceptably slothful' in the performance of its duties. The Select Committee invited Maxwell-Hyslop to give evidence on the case which moved him to table his motion and he did so, revealing that the case he referred took 15 months to complete. Maxwell-Hyslop said that the delay was 'intolerable', 'disgraceful' and 'shameful'; a letter received from Barrowclough was 'astonishingly complacent'.

Barrowclough rejected the accusation of slothfulness, noting that the staff had been working diligently and were working on other cases beside that referred by Maxwell-Hyslop. Barrowclough explained that the case in question was dealt with a section of the Office which was dealing with significant tax and agriculture cases. The Select Committee asked Barrowclough how the Office would cope with the difficulties of such lengthy investigations. A Cabinet Office review also followed.

Barrowclough sought to recruit extra staff and transfer more cases between investigators to avoid bottlenecks. However, the average time taken to complete an investigation continued to lengthen, reaching 15 months by the end of 1989. The Cabinet Office review suggested a large degree of delegation and changes in investigation practice. Barrowclough maintained that the Parliamentary Commissioner Act 1967 required his personal involvement in each case. He insisted, against the criticism, that the Office maintain the highest standards of investigative thoroughness and reporting quality. When Barrowclough departed the Office in 1989, the casework was what he described as 'low volume, high density' and given rigorous attention unlike that administered by comparable offices elsewhere.

In handling health complaints, Barrowclough's tenure as Ombudsman was dominated by the challenges of the increasing volume of cases, growing criticism of the time taken to complete cases and the ongoing conundrum of how to satisfactorily to deal with complaints about family practitioners and matters of clinical judgment. These issues remained unresolved. He handled some health complaints of note during his tenure.

A woman who sought an independent professional review in 1985 of the circumstances surrounding the death of her four-day-old daughter complained of delays in arranging and conducting the investigation. Eighteen months were taken between the initial request and sending the report to the complainant during which there were delays and false assurances. Barrowclough commented that it was 'intolerable that the complainant, having suffered the tragic death of her baby, should have her ability to come to terms with such a tragic loss hampered by such serious maladministration'. Barrowclough also reported on a case where a former hospital patient discovered full-frontal naked photographs of himself in a medical textbook which had been written by the professor who had treated him. The photographs had been used without the patient's knowledge or consent and Barrowclough criticised the breach of confidentiality.

Another case received tabloid attention when a patient in a women's ward complained that she had suffered distress when nurses had failed to prevent a drunken man from having sexual intercourse with his wife in a nearby hospital bed. Barrowclough recorded dryly that 'the complainant said that the husband had started fondling his wife's breast but his wife had deterred him because they were 'not alone'. Barrowclough continued that 'my officer asked the complainant to describe what had happened then; she said that she could hear 'everything' and she instanced the bed creaking, but she could not see anything'.

The report methodically noted that a nurse found the curtains drawn around the bed and called out "Do you want a hand?" to which the drunken man replied "No thanks, I can manage". When the Ombudsman issued the report, The Sun printed the story with the headline 'Oh nurse, I'm feeling a little dickie!'.

=== Barlow Clowes ===
Barrowclough's greatest achievement as Ombudsman came in his investigation into the actions of the Department of Trade and Industry in licensing the Barlow Clowes group of companies. Barrowclough would report that it was 'the most complex, wide-ranging and onerous investigation' ever undertaken by the Office. The case attracted unprecedented press and Parliamentary attention, with between 150 and 200 MPs contacting the Office.

18,000 customers invested their money with Barlow Clowes on the recommendation of intermediaries. The company was established as a 'bond-washing' operation, in which gilt-edged Government bonds were purchased and sold in order to create tax advantages. Investors believed that their money had been invested risk-free. However, much of the money was diverted to fund the extravagant lifestyle of the company's co-founder, Peter Clowes. After increasing concern about the operations of Barlow Clowes, the Department launched an investigation.

On the strength of the evidence uncovered, Barlow Clowes was wound up by the High Court in May 1988, owing £190 million. Many of the victims were retired people who had lost the entirety of their life savings who now faced hardship or poverty. Peter Clowes was ultimately convicted of fraud and theft and sentenced to imprisonment for 10 years.

The press reported that the Department, as the licensing authority, had ignored warnings about Barlow Clowes from both the company's competitors and from reputable sources in the City. It was alleged that the Department knew as early as 1984 that Barlow Clowes was trading without a licence, that it gave the company a licence in 1985 and renewed it in both 1986 and 1987.

The Secretary of State for Trade and Industry, Lord Young sought to defuse the matter in June 1988 by appointing Sir Godfray Le Quesne QC to hold an independent inquiry to determine the facts of what happened within the Department. The Le Quesne report was published in October 1988. Young announced that the Department had acted reasonably in the circumstances and that the Government had no liability to the investors. Backbench MPs from all sides of the House voiced their anger and dismay at the attitude of the Government and the narrowness of the Le Quesne report's terms of reference. Twelve MPs referred the matter to the Office. Barrowclough undertook an exhaustive investigation, establishing a unit dedicated to cope with the demands of the case. Barrowclough published his 170-page, 120,000-word report in December 1989. It identified irregularities in the affairs of Barlow Clowes which dated back to the 1970s and held that the Department had committed five acts of maladministration. It was concluded that if departmental officials had examined the affairs of the business properly in 1985 on the basis of the warnings the Department had received, it was a 'virtual certainty' that they would have closed Barlow Clowes down.

Nicholas Ridley, who had replaced Young as Secretary of State, rejected the main thrust of Barrowclough's findings and claimed that departmental officials had acted correctly on external advice. Nevertheless, Ridley reversed the position that the Government would not bailout investors, announcing a compensation package that would guarantee investors of less than £50,000 a 90% refund. In all, the Government agreed to pay £150 million to investors. Ridley, out of political expediency, added the caveat that the payment of compensation was purely 'because of the recommendation of the Parliamentary Commissioner'.

Through his investigation, Barrowclough had forced the Government to change its attitude towards the investors, compensating them for the great majority of their losses. The thoroughness in which he had investigated, a practice for which Barrowclough had hitherto been criticised, had helped secure justice for the victims of Barlow Clowes and the biggest compensation payment ever procured by the Office.

== Retirement ==
At the conclusion of his term as Ombudsman, Barrowclough served as a council member and tribunal chairman of the Financial Intermediaries, Managers and Brokers Regulatory Association (FIMBRA).

Barrowclough moved to Winsford, Exmoor. He chaired the Dartmoor Steering Group, through which he liaised with Army commanders over military activities on the moor.

Barrowclough died in 2003. In his obituary he was described as having 'a fine legal mind with a high sense of fairness and plain dealing'. Of his work at the Ombudsman it was commented that 'he left no stone unturned in his inquiries, working extraordinarily long hours with a small support staff to reach his conclusions.'

Government offices
| Preceded by Sir Cecil Clothier | Parliamentary Commissioner for Administration; 1985–1989 | Succeeded by Sir William Reid |
| Preceded by Sir Cecil Clothier | Health Service Commissioner for England; 1985–1989 | Succeeded by Sir William Reid |
| Preceded by Sir Cecil Clothier | Health Service Commissioner for Scotland; 1985–1989 | Succeeded by Sir William Reid |
| Preceded by Sir Cecil Clothier | Health Service Commissioner for Wales; 1985–1989 | Succeeded by Sir William Reid |
