= Michael Buckley (civil servant) =

English civil servant (born 1939)

Sir Michael Buckley

Parliamentary Commissioner for Administration; Health Service Commissioner for England; Health Service Commissioner for Wales
- In office 1 January 1997 – 3 November 2002
- Preceded by: Sir William Reid
- Succeeded by: Ann Abraham

Health Service Commissioner for Scotland
- In office 1 January 1997 – 23 October 2002
- Preceded by: Sir William Reid
- Succeeded by: Post abolished

Personal details
- Born: 20 June 1939 (age 87) Beckenham, Kent
- Spouses: Shirley Stordy (m. 1972; died 1991) Judith Cartmell (m. 1992)
- Education: Christ Church, Oxford

Sir Michael Sydney Buckley (born 20 June 1939) is an English retired civil servant who was Parliamentary Commissioner for Administration and Health Service Commissioner for England, Scotland and Wales (Parliamentary and Health Service Ombudsman) between 1997 and 2002.

Buckley was born in 1939 and educated at Eltham College and Christ Church, Oxford where he studied Mods and Greats. In 1962, Buckley joined the Treasury as an Assistant Principal. He was the Assistant Private Secretary to the Chancellor of the Exchequer, James Callaghan between 1965 and 1966.

He was then a Principal at the Treasury until 1968, when he moved to the Civil Service Department, where he stayed until 1971. Buckley moved back to the Treasury as Principal and then as Assistant Secretary between 1974 and 1977. He was at the Department of Industry between 1977 and 1980 and then moved back to the Treasury yet again as an Assistant Secretary.

In 1982 Buckley became the Under Secretary of the Cabinet Office before becoming the head of the electricity and coal divisions at the Department of Energy in 1985. In 1989 Buckley became the principal establishment and finance officer at the department, where he served until 1991. Buckley was Chairman of Dartford and Gravesham NHS Trust between 1995 and 1996.

== Ombudsman ==
Buckley was appointed as Parliamentary and Health Service Ombudsman to succeed Sir William Reid and took up the post in January 1997.

As a priority, Buckley sought to eliminate the backlog of casework which had accumulated without affecting the quality of investigations undertaken by the Office. He targeted additional staff and changes in working methods and management as means of speeding up investigation throughput times. Staff would only undertake work that would add value to the resolution of a complaint. It was no longer to be assumed that all aspects of every complaint were to be exhaustively examined.

Delegation within the Office also went much deeper so that decisions were made at the lowest appropriate level. Other additions to Office practice included targets, performance appraisals for staff, reviews of performance against targets and time recording. Screening and investigation staff were now to be employed on permanent contracts instead of the Office relying on those on short-term contracts and secondments.

As a consequence of these initiatives, the average throughput time for cases fell from 91 weeks in 1998–99 to just 44 weeks in 1999–2000. Investigations backlogs were also eliminated. These improvements were being achieved against a backdrop of consistently heavy workload: the Office was annually receiving approximately 1,500 new cases.

Greater use was also made of informal investigations to secure redress for complainants. Greater publicity was also given to the existence of the Office, including a website that included an interactive complaints form. The Office was also moved to new premises at Millbank Tower.

In 2002, Buckley criticised the Government for withholding information from his investigation into the Hinduja affair, in which Secretary of State for Northern Ireland Peter Mandelson was accused of attempting to influence a passport application by Srichand Hinduja. Buckley complained that the refusal to release the information 'strikes at the very heart of my office's function and effectively made my investigation unsustainable'.

The Cabinet Office apologised and disclosed to Buckley the papers he sought. Buckley criticised the Home Office for its failure to maintain its files on the sensitive issue in 'anything approaching an adequate manner'. Buckley had sought a transcript of a disputed telephone call between Mandelson and the Home Office Minister Mike O'Brien about the affair. However, the Home Office were unable to find many of the papers for the case. Tony Wright, Chairman of the Public Affairs Select Committee, said the affair demonstrated 'appalling record keeping, horrific administrative failures and breakdowns in IT systems' in Government departments.

The most notable Parliamentary case handled by the Office during Buckley's term as Ombudsman concerned complaints about the actions of the Department of Social Security in connection with SERPS. SERPS as an additional pension under which widows and widowers would receive the full additional pension earned by their spouse. The Social Security Act 1986 changed inheritance rules so that widows and widowers would only receive half of the amount of the additional pension.

The department failed to mention this change in its leaflets or bring attention to it when enquiries were made by the public. When it became apparent that the imminent change was not widely known in 1998, 344 individual complaints were referred to the Office by MPs.

Buckley selected a cross-section of complaints as representative of the whole and undertook an investigation, reporting in March 2000. He found there had been maladministration, criticising its failure to produce accurate leaflets and not checking that its staff were aware of the change in the law. The burden of proof would be on the department to show that people claiming to have been misled would have acted differently had they not been misinformed.

The Secretary of State for Social Security, Alistair Darling accepted the report and announced that the changes to the inheritance provisions would be postponed until 2002 and that the Government would establish a scheme which would protect the pensions rights of those who had been misinformed. After a Select Committee report, the scheme was abandoned and Darling announced a new set of proposals giving full protection to every pensioner and introducing a transitional arrangement for those approaching retirement age.

Buckley wrote a second report on the issue, published in February 2001. In it, he expressed satisfaction that the Government's proposals would correct the effects of past maladministration, giving time for those approaching retirement to adjust their financial arrangements. The Government undertook to mount a publicity campaign and to write to all pensioners and those coming up to retirement age.

Buckley replicated the practice of delegation for health investigations, arguing that it was a necessary decision given the increasing numbers of complaints about clinical judgment, which had only just been brought within the remit of the Ombudsman. The nature of the role of Health Service Ombudsman, it was commented, 'changed fundamentally' during Buckley's tenure. More than four-fifths of the health investigations it undertook concerned clinical judgment, a radical change from the previous concern with maladministration and service failure. Buckley developed a more business-orientated approach to the handling of health cases and oversaw a smooth transition to coping with the extended jurisdiction over clinical judgment matters.

Buckley concluded at the end of his tenure that the Office had 'come a long way' under his stewardship. He observed that 'the mountainous backlogs have been cleared. Output records have consistently been broken... There is a larger and more flexible range of tools for dealing with complaints... there have been fundamental changes in organisation, in employment policies, in training and development'.

== Post-Ombudsman and personal life ==
He was knighted in the 2002 New Year Honours. After serving as Ombudsman, Buckley became a member of the General Medical Council, serving between 2003 and 2008.

Government offices
Preceded by Sir William Reid	Parliamentary Commissioner for Administration; 1997–2002	Succeeded by Ann Abraham
Preceded by Sir William Reid	Health Service Commissioner for England; 1997–2002	Succeeded by Ann Abraham
Preceded by Sir William Reid	Health Service Commissioner for Scotland; 1997–2002	Succeeded by Post abolished
Preceded by Sir William Reid	Health Service Commissioner for Wales; 1997–2002	Succeeded by Ann Abraham
