= Accreditation Service for International Colleges =

Educational organization of the United Kingdom

Accreditation Service for International Colleges and Universities
- Abbreviation: ASIC
- Formation: 2007
- Legal status: Non-Profit
- Purpose: Assuring UK border reporting, and quality assurance services to independent colleges and universities
- Location: ASIC, Fast Track House, Pearson Way, Thornaby on Tees, TS17 6PT
- Region served: UK and Global
- Members: ENQA (affiliate), CHEA IQG, EDEN, NAFSA, BQF, UN Academic Impact Continuing Professional Development Professional Development
- Chairman: Maurice Dimmock
- Main organ: ASIC Board
- Website: asicuk.com

The Accreditation Service for International Schools, Colleges and Universities (ASIC) is a private educational agency based in the United Kingdom that accredits UK-based and international schools, universities, and other education providers.

ASIC has been appointed by the United Kingdom Government's Home Office UK Border Agency to accredit private UK colleges for visa purposes. In this capacity, ASIC distinguishes colleges that actually provide educational services from bogus institutions that allow international students to obtain fraudulent visas.

== Higher Education authorization ==
The United Kingdom - ASIC is recognized by the UK Government's UK Visas and Immigration (UKVI), which is part of the UK Home Office.

United Arab Emirates - ASIC is recognized as an institutional accreditor.

Thailand - ASIC is a recognized institutional accreditor.

Kingdom of Jordan - ASIC is recognized as a provider of institutional accreditation.

== Primary and secondary authorization ==
Indonesia - ASIC is recognized as an institutional accreditor.

== See also ==
- List of recognized higher education accreditation organizations
- Higher education accreditation
