= UK Register of Learning Providers =

Website

The UK Register of Learning Providers (UKRLP) is a website at https://www.ukrlp.co.uk/ which collects and disseminates information about learning providers in the United Kingdom. Registration with the site allows a school, college or other training organisation to share and update its information with organisations such as the Higher Education Funding Council for England, the Higher Education Statistics Agency, and the Skills Funding Agency. Information on the site can also be accessed by members of the public. The registry was created on 1 August 2005, and lists over 30,000 learning providers. Registration is free.

The registry is operated by the Education and Skills Funding Agency, which verifies the institution exists but provides no endorsements or assurance of quality. Each registered entity is assigned a UK Provider Reference Number (UKPRN). Registration is not mandatory, but is required to obtain certain types of government funding.

Apprenticeship training providers who wish to appear on the UK's Register of Apprenticeship Training Providers in order to access funding from the Apprenticeship Levy from May 2017 and deliver apprenticeship training must be registered with the UKRLP.
