= Julie Mellor =

Dame Julie Thérèse Mellor DBE

Parliamentary Commissioner for Administration Health Service Commissioner for England
- In office 1 January 2012 – 1 January 2017
- Preceded by: Ann Abraham

Chair of the Equal Opportunities Commission
- In office 1999–2005

Personal details
- Born: 29 January 1957 (age 69) Bedford, England
- Education: Brasenose College, Oxford

Dame Julie Thérèse Mellor DBE (born 29 January 1957) is chair of the Food Foundation and of the Skills Federation.

She was made a Dame Commander of the Order of the British Empire in 2006 for services to equality. As chair of the Equal Opportunities Commission (1999–2005) she is credited with transforming a law enforcement body into a catalyst for change on equal pay, pregnancy discrimination and flexible working.

Mellor was born in 1957 and studied experimental psychology at Brasenose College, Oxford, where she is now an honorary fellow. Between 1979 and 1981, she was Eleanor Emerson Fellow in Industrial Relations Education at Cornell University.

Before her appointment as chair of the Equal Opportunities Commission (EOC) her career was in human resources, working for Royal Dutch Shell (1981–1983), the Greater London Council (1983–1986), the Inner London Education Authority (1986–1989), Trustee Savings Bank (1989–1992) and as corporate human resources director for British Gas (1992–1996). She worked as a consultant on employment and consumer issues until 1999. She is currently chair of the Federation for Industry Sector Skills and Standards.

Following her time at the EOC she was a partner in the health team at PricewaterhouseCoopers (2005–2011) and pioneered citizens' juries as part of the firm's contribution to the public sector. She was the Parliamentary Commissioner for Administration and the Health Service Commissioner for England (Parliamentary and Health Service Ombudsman) (2012 to 2017) where she increased investigations of complaints about public services tenfold from around 450 a year to 5,000 a year and worked with Parliament to use the learning from complaints to hold government to account for improving public services. She was chair of both Demos the cross party think tank (2018-2026) and the Young Foundation, (2016-2022).

Mellor has been a non-executive board member on the Commission for Racial Equality (1996 and 2003), the Fatherhood Institute (2004–2008), the National Consumer Council (2001–2007), the Employers' Forum on Disability (1994–2009), the Green Alliance (2007–2009) and the Department for Business, Innovation and Skills (2008–2011). She was a trustee of Involve (experts in public participation) (2017-2023), Nesta (the innovation foundation)(2011-2017) and Clore Social Leadership.

Mellor is a member of the WorldSkills UK Skills taskforce for global Britain.

== Honours ==
In 2003, she was awarded an honorary doctorate by Anglia Ruskin University. She was made an Honorary Fellow of Brasenose College, Oxford, and a Fellow of the City & Guilds of London Institute.

Government offices
Preceded by Kamlesh Bahl	Chair of the Equal Opportunities Commission; 1999–2005	Succeeded by Jenny Watson
Preceded by Ann Abraham	Parliamentary Commissioner for Administration; 2012–2017	Succeeded by Rob Behrens
Preceded by Ann Abraham	Health Service Commissioner for England; 2012–2017	Succeeded by Rob Behrens
