= Edmund Compton =

English civil servant

Sir Edmund Compton GCB KBE

Parliamentary Commissioner for Administration
- In office 1 April 1967 – 31 March 1971
- Preceded by: New office
- Succeeded by: Sir Alan Marre

Personal details
- Born: 30 July 1906
- Died: 11 March 1994 (aged 87) London
- Spouse: Betty Williams
- Children: 5
- Education: New College, Oxford

Sir Edmund Gerald Compton GCB KBE (30 July 1906 – 11 March 1994) was a civil servant and the first Parliamentary Commissioner for Administration.

== Early life and family ==
Compton was the child of Edmund Compton, involved in South American trade, and a mother from a clerical background. He was schooled at Rugby where he had won a scholarship and developed a love of music.

At Oxford University Compton became acquainted with the renowned historian and educationalist H. A. L. Fisher, who was the Warden of New College. Compton was among the undergraduates (of whom Richard Crossman was one) invited by Fisher to socialise with the likes of Gilbert Murray, Hilaire Belloc, General Smuts and David Lloyd George. It was during this time that Compton determined to enter public service.

In 1934, he married Betty Tresyllian Williams (d. 1987), of a Quaker carpet-making family from Kidderminster. They had one son and four daughters, of whom the youngest is Isobel Sidney, Viscountess De L'Isle.

== Civil service ==
Compton entered the civil service in 1929 and was transferred to the Colonial Service, during which he visited Nigeria. In 1931 he was transferred to the Treasury where he developed a reputation as a very capable civil servant. At the beginning of the Second World War, Compton was seconded to the Ministry of Aircraft Production where he served as the Private Secretary to the Minister, Lord Beaverbrook. Returning to the Treasury in 1942, Compton became known as an effective wartime operator. In peacetime, Compton continued his ascent through the Treasury, being appointed in turn Third Secretary in 1949 and Comptroller and Auditor General in 1958. In these roles he demonstrated characteristics of dependability and versatility. He was described by the Chairman of the Public Accounts Committee, John Boyd-Carpenter as being "enormously knowledgeable on public finance".

== Ombudsman ==
At the 1964 general election, Labour pledged to establish an office to handle complaints against government departments.

In 1967, the Prime Minister Harold Wilson appointed Compton to be first Parliamentary Commissioner (or 'Ombudsman'). Wilson trusted Compton to navigate the office through its formative years. He previously worked with Compton when he had been Chairman of the Public Accounts Committee and described him as "one of the shrewdest, cleverest, and nicest, men in Whitehall". Compton, he said, taught him "a very great deal about how government operates in Britain".

The challenge Compton faced was to establish the Ombudsman's Office in the face of considerable public scepticism about its efficacy. The media described the office as 'pointless' and 'ludicrously emasculated' and Compton as a 'swordless crusader'. Compton busied himself recruiting staff during 1966 and 1967 and formulated the structure and operating procedures of the office. He drew upon his previous experience, using the Exchequer and Audit Department of the Treasury as a model. Staff were borrowed from other departments and legal advice procured from the Treasury Solicitor's Department. Compton sought civil servants with 'enquiring minds' and the 'ability to size up cases and people rather than the ability to organise or to plan'. Compton also pioneered an investigation procedure that was to remain unchanged for thirty years and was unique among ombudsman schemes. The procedure involved a ten part jurisdiction test of complaints, a two-stage investigation process and a final reporting stage.

Compton took a low-key approach to his work, making limited efforts to publicise the office. As a result, the number of cases handled by the office was low from the outset and diminished further. The practice of publishing anonymised reports on an annual basis often long after the events described attracted criticism that this garnered too little publicity for the office.

=== Sachsenhausen ===
Compton investigated the first major case to be referred to the Office. Former prisoners of war of Sachsenhausen concentration camp complained that they had been denied compensation by the Foreign Office in its administration of a scheme to compensate victims of Nazi persecution. Their complaint was referred to the Office by Airey Neave MP, who had himself escaped from Colditz during the war. The Foreign Office had concluded that the complainants were not entitled to compensation having been imprisoned outside the camp proper. It considered the treatment of the complainants to have been comparable to a breach of the Geneva Convention rather than the systematic brutality of a 'normal' concentration camp. Compton concluded that there were defects in the administrative procedure by which the Foreign Office had decided to reject the claims. He found that the reputation of the complainants had suffered as a result and that this constituted injustice. Compton thought that the result of his investigation would serve to vindicate their claims and affirm their sincerity. In the House of Commons debate that followed the report in February 1968 the Secretary of State for Foreign Affairs George Brown defended the position of the Foreign Office while announcing his intention to pay compensation to the complainants. Brown asserted that there had been no 'bungling' or 'blundering' by the Foreign Office and that the issue was merely one of judgment. Members expressed little support for the begrudging way in which Brown had agreed to pay compensation. The Select Committee on the Parliamentary Commissioner for Administration endorsed the findings of the report and rejected the contentions of the Foreign Office.

Having adversely reported against the Foreign Office and secured a remedy for the complainants, Compton had enhanced the reputation of the Office and demonstrated that it would be able to address wrongs done by less weightier departments. Compton had also proven incorrect critics of the Office who had doubted its ability to confront departmental injustice.

== Boundaries and the BBC ==
Following his tenure as Ombudsman, Compton served as the Chairman of the Boundary Commission between 1971 and 1978. He was then Chairman of the Programmes Complaints Commission at the British Broadcasting Corporation between 1972 and 1981 where he was distinctly even-handed between the public and imaginative programme producers.

Compton died in 1994 and was described by Tam Dalyell MP as 'a very considerable public servant of the British state.'

Government offices
Preceded by New Office	Parliamentary Commissioner for Administration; 1967–1971	Succeeded by Sir Alan Marre
