= Idwal Pugh =

Welsh civil servant (1918–2010)

Sir Idwal Pugh CB KCB

Parliamentary Commissioner for Administration; Health Service Commissioner for England; Health Service Commissioner for Scotland; Health Service Commissioner for Wales
- In office 1 April 1976 – 31 December 1978
- Preceded by: Sir Alan Marre
- Succeeded by: Sir Cecil Clothier

Personal details
- Born: 10 February 1918 Blaenau Ffestiniog, Gwynedd, Wales
- Died: 21 April 2010 (aged 92) Oxford, Oxfordshire, England
- Spouse: Mair Lewis (d. 1985)
- Education: St John's College, Oxford

Military service
- Branch/service: British Army
- Rank: Major
- Unit: Royal Army Service Corps
- Battles/wars: World War II • Second Battle of El Alamein • Invasion of Sicily • Italian campaign

Sir Idwal Vaughan Pugh KCB (10 February 1918 – 21 April 2010) was a civil servant who was Permanent Secretary at the Welsh Office and distinguished himself as Parliamentary Commissioner for Administration and Health Service Commissioner for England, Scotland and Wales (Parliamentary and Health Service Ombudsman).

== Early life and war service ==
Pugh was born in 1918 in Blaenau Ffestiniog, Gwynedd to Rhys, a quarryman and later bus conductor, and Elizabeth, a schoolteacher. He was raised by relatives Thomas and Mary Vaughan in Ton Pentre in the Rhondda Valley and educated at Cowbridge Grammar School. He won an Open Scholarship to study Mods and Greats at St John's College, Oxford and graduated in 1940 whereupon he joined the Army.

Pugh served in the Royal Army Service Corps before transferring to the 7th Armoured Division (desert rats), with which he served in North Africa, Sicily and Italy. He served on the staff of Field Marshal Alexander in Caserta. Pugh had reached the rank of Major when he was demobilised in 1946.

== Civil service ==
Pugh joined the Ministry of Civil Aviation as an Assistant Principal in 1946, where he organised supplies and chartered aircraft for the Berlin Airlift. He was also a delegate to the International Civil Aviation Organisation in Montreal. Pugh moved to the Ministry of Transport as Assistant Secretary, where he was put in charge of the Road Transport Division in 1956.

In this role, Pugh dealt with angry road hauliers during the fuel shortages caused by the Suez Crisis. He also spent two years as civil air attaché in Washington, D.C. before he was promoted in 1959 to Under-Secretary. Pugh moved to the Ministry of Housing and Local Government in 1961, where he became Deputy Secretary. During his time there, he chaired an inter-departmental inquiry into ways of modernising the planning system and his proposals for fewer and more independent planning authorities were broadly accepted by the government.

In 1969, Pugh became Permanent Secretary of the Welsh Office before moving to the much enlarged Department of the Environment in 1971 to serve with the Secretary of State for the Environment, Peter Walker as Second Permanent Secretary. At the department, Pugh acquired a dislike of the Treasury but nevertheless acquitted himself well during a challenging time.

== Ombudsman ==
In 1976, Pugh was appointed Parliamentary and Health Service Ombudsman. He would shape the role and demonstrated characteristics of toughness, rigid fairness, accuracy and independence. For his acceptance of the post, he was shunned by his former colleagues in government departments.

Pugh was dauntless in his criticism of maladministration within both Government departments and the National Health Service. He also brought with him an attitude that the Office should be more than a mere tool for members of parliament. To Pugh, the Office was 'the servant of the public'. In this spirit, Pugh modified the filter system that required members of the public to take their complaints to the Ombudsman through their MPs.

In March 1978, Pugh permitted complaints to be made directly to the Office. If the complaint was investigable, it would be sent to the relevant MP who would be asked if a full investigation was wanted. Pugh achieved greater publicity for his role and functions through public appearances, posters and the use of the colloquial term Ombudsman, a word more readily understood by the public. He was rewarded with a record number of referrals: 1,259 in 1978 from 461 MPs.

After investigating a particularly serious instance of maladministration by the Department of Health and Social Security, Pugh was scathing in his criticism. It was discovered that the department had denied Lieutenant-Colonel Terence Otway the full amount of his disability war pension for 23 years despite knowing what the full amount should be. Pugh blasted this 'deceit' and branded it 'deplorable'. Twenty-five officers were found to have been treated similarly and the Director of Public Prosecutions considered whether charges should be brought against the officials concerned. Such was the public outcry, the Secretary of State for Social Services David Ennals was forced to apologise and new rules were established that forbade civil servants from denying a claimant their entitlement when owed money by a government department. Jack Ashley MP referred a complaint to Pugh concerning the policy about whooping cough vaccination. It was complained that the Government had not made available to parents all the information that they should have had before agreeing to have their children vaccinated.

Pugh found that responsibility for the policy rested with the Government and that it had not fully recognised its responsibility to provide information to both doctors and the public. With respect to the latter, Pugh found maladministration. However, the report was not enthusiastically endorsed by Ashley nor the complainants, who thought that Pugh ought to have condemned the departments concerned more roundly. Pugh maintained that parents were being told everything as far as was reasonably possible and that the report could be used to place pressure for compensation for children who suffered brain damage as a result of vaccination.

For Health Service complaints, Pugh was aided in his desire to publicise the functions of the office by the ability of the public to take their complaints directly to the Office. Pugh commented that this 'gives my jurisdiction a directness and immediacy which I welcome'.

During his tenure, Pugh uncovered a number of shocking examples of National Health Service maladministration. A doctor who discharged a 103-year-old patient at 2am on a winter's night who subsequently died was called 'inhuman' by Pugh. Pugh found that a consultant had acted wrongly when he sterilised a woman who had gone into hospital for an abortion without her knowledge.

A woman was found to have been wrongfully admitted to a hospital under the Mental Health Act 1959 and detained for 29 days longer than she should have been. When Pugh reported, the health authority offered just £150 in compensation, a figure the Select Committee increased to £1,000. The volume of health complaint cases grew rapidly during Pugh's time at the Office: from 582 in 1976–7 to 712 in 1978–9. Notably, there was a high uphold rate in the cases fully investigated. It was also pointed out that it was rare for the Health Ombudsman's recommendations not to be accepted.

When Pugh handed over to his successor, he urged civil servants to take note of the mounting complaints from the public about their 'rudeness and oppressive behaviour'.

== The City and retirement ==
After stepping down from the post of Ombudsman in 1978, Pugh worked in the City as a director of Standard Chartered Bank and the Halifax Building Society. Pugh also became Chairman of the Hodge Group and Hodge Finance, founded by his friend Julian Hodge. He was chairman of the Development Corporation for Wales between 1980 and 1983 and the President of the Cardiff Business Club between 1991 and 1998.

Pugh also assumed academic posts, serving as Chairman of the Royal Northern College of Music from 1988 to 1992 and President of Coleg Harlech between 1990 and 1998. To his delight, he was made an honorary Fellow of St John's College and he moved from Cardiff to Oxford, taking a university course in composition. Pugh indulged in his love of music, particularly playing his Steinway piano and listening to Bach. He was still taking lessons in composition and the piano in 2010. Pugh also spent time reading and walking and became an accomplished cook.

== Death ==
Pugh died in April 2010. He was predeceased by his wife, Mair Lewis, who died in 1985. Idwal's ashes were scattered in the waters of the Afon Mawddach at Penmaenpool, Gwynedd, in a private ceremony. A permanent memorial to Idwal and Mair was added to the prominent Vaughan family tomb of Mary and Thomas Vaughan in Treorchy Cemetery, Rhondda, in accordance with his wishes.

Government offices
Preceded by Sir Alan Marre	Parliamentary Commissioner for Administration; 1976–1978	Succeeded by Sir Cecil Clothier
Preceded by Sir Alan Marre	Health Service Commissioner for England; 1976–1978	Succeeded by Sir Cecil Clothier
Preceded by Sir Alan Marre	Health Service Commissioner for Scotland; 1976–1978	Succeeded by Sir Cecil Clothier
Preceded by Sir Alan Marre	Health Service Commissioner for Wales; 1976–1978	Succeeded by Sir Cecil Clothier
