= Office of the Independent Adjudicator =

The Office of the Independent Adjudicator for Higher Education (OIA) is a company limited by guarantee and a registered charity which has been designated under the Higher Education Act 2004 to run the higher education student complaints scheme within England and Wales. The OIA's rules outline the complaints that it can and cannot review, these contain new rules from the Consumer Rights Act 2015. The OIA has no regulatory powers over higher education providers, such as universities or colleges, and is unable to punish or fine them. The OIA is routinely subject to criticism by student complainants in online reviews - with many stating that their experiences navigating the ADR has been "frustrating" and "traumatising" and caused them to experience "suicidal ideation". The OIA is a recognised ADR.

== History ==
As a result of recommendations from the Dearing Report, consultations began about an independent body to which students could make complaints. A white paper in 2003 set out the government goal of establishing the body via legislation. The OIA was established in 2003 and began running a voluntary scheme in 2004 with it becoming the designated operator of the student complaints scheme in 2005. The OIA has effectively replaced the role of the visitor, as student complaints were specifically excluded from the remit of the visitor in the Higher Education Act 2004. By law, all higher education bodies are required to abide by the rules of the OIA's complaints scheme. The OIA is not a "public authority" and therefore not covered by the Freedom of Information Act 2000 or required to answer requests for information. but is covered by a subject access request.

== Student complaints scheme ==
The OIA is funded by compulsory annual subscriptions from over 800 higher education providers that are members of its scheme, receiving £5.4 million in 2019 from subscriptions. The OIA's board of directors has 15 members.

The OIA considers a wide range of procedural issues, but under section 12 of the Higher Education Act 2004 it does not review matters of academic judgment. Its guidance defines academic judgment as decisions where the opinion of an academic expert is essential, such as marks awarded, degree classifications, research methodology, the adequacy of feedback, or course content and outcomes. However, OIA may review whether the provider of higher education has followed its own assessment, marking, and moderation procedures, and whether there was any bias, unfairness, or maladministration in the decision-making process.

The OIA Scheme Rules describe its role as conducting a review rather than a full re-hearing of a complaint, determining whether the higher education provider has acted reasonably and in line with its own procedures, and not undertaking a fresh examination of the underlying merits of the case. In practice, this review involves seeking information from both the complainant and the higher education provider, allowing each party to comment, and considering whether the provider’s regulations are reasonable and have been correctly applied. The OIA and Judicial Review guidance notes that the organisation has broad discretion in determining the extent of its review, may investigate the underlying merits of a complaint in certain circumstances, and continues its investigation until it is satisfied that it has all the material needed to reach a decision.

Results can include payment of compensation from the higher education institution where the complaint is upheld and so far compensation payments have exceeded £700,000 with the largest single award being £45,000 compensating a student for legal expenses. In 2015, 20 complainants in all received more than £5,000. The other 210 received an average of less than £1,500. In 2010, the number of complaints represented just 0.05 per cent of the 2.2 million students enrolled in higher education.

In 2019, only 3% of complaints reviewed by the OIA were Justified, 11% were Partly Justified, 9% Settled, 17% were classed as Not Eligible, 10% were withdrawn and 50% were Not Justified. The OIA has discretion to publish summaries of complaints.

The OIA is required to report to the board and publish in his annual report any non-compliance with recommendations by a university.

In a report commissioned by the OIA, titled Student Satisfaction with the Office of the Independent Adjudicator for Higher Education, said "in all, the predominant emotions felt by students at the end of the OIA process are highly negative, and very similar to those felt by students at the end of the HEI process that led them to the OIA."
