= Parliamentary Commissioner Act 1967 =

Act of the Parliament of the United Kingdom

Parliamentary Commissioner Act 1967 (Note: Section 14(1).)
- Act of Parliament
- Parliament of the United Kingdom
- Long title: An Act to make provision for the appointment and functions of a Parliamentary Commissioner for the investigation of administrative action take on behalf of the Crown, and for purposes connected therewith.
- Citation: 1967 c. 13
- Introduced by: Richard Crossman
- Territorial extent: United Kingdom

Dates
- Royal assent: 22 March 1967
- Commencement: 1 April 1967 (Note: Section 14(2). The Parliamentary Commissioner Act 1967 (Commencement) Order 1967.)

Other legislation
- Amends: House of Commons Disqualification Act 1957
- Amended by: Tribunals and Inquiries Act 1971; Civil Aviation Act 1971; Tribunals and Inquiries Act 1971; House of Commons Disqualification Act 1975; Northern Ireland Assembly Disqualification Act 1975; Official Secrets Act 1989; Trade Union Reform and Employment Rights Act 1993; National Lottery etc. Act 1993; Coal Industry Act 1994; Employment Relations Act 1999; Immigration and Asylum Act 1999; Postal Services Act 2000; Countryside and Rights of Way Act 2000; Statute Law (Repeals) Act 2004; Horserace Betting and Olympic Lottery Act 2004; Domestic Violence, Crime and Victims Act 2004; Human Tissue Act 2004; Railways Act 2005; National Lottery Act 2006; Government of Wales Act 2006; Child Maintenance and Other Payments Act 2008; Constitutional Reform and Governance Act 2010; Postal Services Act 2011; Statute Law (Repeals) Act 2013; Trade Act 2021; Employment Rights Act 2025

Status: Amended

Text of statute as originally enacted

Revised text of statute as amended

Text of the Parliamentary Commissioner Act 1967 as in force today (including any amendments) within the United Kingdom, from legislation.gov.uk.

The Parliamentary Commissioner Act 1967 (c. 13) is an act of the Parliament of the United Kingdom.

It established the office of the Parliamentary Commissioner for Administration (Parliamentary Ombudsman). The Ombudsman is responsible for investigating the administrative actions of central government departments and public authorities. The office is independent of the Government and the civil service.

== Section 5 ==
Under s5(1) the Ombudsman may, on a reference being made to him, investigate actions (including a failure to act) taken on or behalf of a specified public authority which are in the exercise of administrative functions.

The Ombudsman may investigate if a written complaint has been made to a Member of Parliament, the member of public claims to have sustained injustice in consequence of maladministration in connection with administrative action and the complaint has been referred to the Ombudsman with the consent of the complainant.

=== Maladministration ===
The term 'maladministration' is not defined in the Act. During the debate over the Bill, the Leader of the House of Commons Richard Crossman made it clear that it did not extend to policy, which was a matter for Parliament or discretionary decisions. He speculated on what might constitute maladministration in what became called the 'Crossman catalogue':

'A positive definition of maladministration is far more difficult to achieve. We might have made an attempt in this Clause to define, by catalogue, all of the qualities which make up maladministration, which might count for maladministration by a civil servant. It would be a wonderful exercise - bias, neglect, inattention, delay, incompetence, inaptitude, perversity, turpitude, arbitrariness and so on. It would be a long and interesting list'.

The list is an open-ended one. Crossman also explained that the meaning of 'maladministration' should be filled out by the experience of case work.

In his 1993 Annual Report as Ombudsman, Sir William Reid sought to expand upon the Crossman catalogue to emphasise that 'maladministration' should not be interpreted restrictively. Reid specifically added an 'unwillingness to treat the complainant as a person with rights; refusal to answer reasonable questions; knowingly giving advice which is misleading or inadequate; offering no redress or manifestly disproportionate redress; and partiality' to the possible examples of maladministration.

=== Injustice ===
Like 'maladministration', 'injustice' was left undefined in the Act. Crossman did not want to give the word a legalistic overtone that could exclude 'the sense of outrage aroused by unfair or incompetent administration, even where the complainant has suffered no actual loss'.

=== Jurisdiction ===
Under s5(2) the Ombudsman must not investigate where the person aggrieved has or has had a right of appeal, reference or review to a tribunal or a remedy by way of legal proceedings.

The Ombudsman can forego this requirement if satisfied that it was not reasonable to expect the person aggrieved to have resort to a legal remedy.

=== Discretion ===
Under s5(5) the Ombudsman has discretion to determine whether to initiate or discontinue an investigation and any question of whether a complaint is duly made under the Act.

== Section 6 ==
The complainant must make the complaint himself unless he has died or is unable to act himself under s6(2). Local authorities and certain public authorities cannot make a complaint under s6(1).

=== Time bar ===
Under s6(3), a complaint must be made to a Member of Parliament not later than twelve months from the day on which the person aggrieved first had notice of the matters alleged in the complaint. The Ombudsman has the discretion to investigate complaints outside the time limit if he considers that there are special circumstances which make it proper to do so.

== Section 7 ==
The Ombudsman must afford the principal officer of the department or authority concerned and any other person alleged to have taken action complained of an opportunity to comment on the allegations under s7(1).

Under s7(2), investigations must be conducted in private. Apart from provisions in the Act, the Ombudsman may also adopt the procedures he considers fit for the investigation and obtain information from such persons in such manner and make inquiries as he sees fit.

== Sections 8 and 9 ==
Under s8, the Ombudsman may require any Minister or member of the department or authority concerned to furnish or produce any such document. It is made clear that the Ombudsman possesses the same powers as the High Court in respect of the attendance and examination of witnesses and in respect of the production of documents.

However, there is no obligation to maintain secrecy applied to the disclosure of information for the purposes of an investigation; and the Crown is not entitled in relation to any such investigation to privileges in respect of the production of documents or the giving of evidence as is allowed in legal proceedings.

Under s9, the Ombudsman may certify an offence of contempt of court to the High Court, which can proceed as if the offence had been committed in relation to the High Court.

== Section 10 ==
Under s10(1), the Ombudsman must give reasons for not investigating. Under s10(2), where an investigation is conducted, the Ombudsman must send a report to the Member of Parliament, the principal officer of the department or authority and any other person alleged to have taken or authorised the action complained of.

=== Special reports ===
Section 10(3) allows the Ombudsman, if he thinks fit, to lay a special report before Parliament if injustice has been caused to the person aggrieved in consequence of maladministration and the injustice has not been, or will not be, remedied.

Section 10(4) allows the Ombudsman to lay before Parliament other reports as to his functions from time to time.

Annual reports are required to be laid before Parliament.

== Section 11 ==
Under s11(3), a Minister may give notice that, in his opinion, the disclosure of information would be prejudicial to the safety of the state or otherwise contrary to the public interest. The Ombudsman is then not authorised to communicate to any person or for any purpose any document or information specified in the notice.

== Section 11A ==
Under s11A(1), the Ombudsman must consult with other ombudsmen if he forms the opinion that a complaint relates to a matter which could be subject to an investigation by them.
