= Maladministration =

Unreasonable actions of a government body

Maladministration is the actions of a government body which can be seen as causing an injustice. The law in the United Kingdom says Ombudsmen must investigate maladministration.

The definition of maladministration is wide and can include:

- Delay
- Incorrect action or failure to take any action
- Failure to follow procedures or the law
- Failure to provide information
- Inadequate record-keeping
- Failure to investigate
- Failure to reply
- Misleading or inaccurate statements
- Inadequate liaison
- Inadequate consultation
- Broken promises

== See also ==
- Administration (government)
- Public administration
- Public administration theory
