= Summary Jurisdiction Act 1884 =

Act of the Parliament of the United Kingdom

Summary Jurisdiction Act 1884 (Note: Section 1.)
- Act of Parliament
- Parliament of the United Kingdom
- Long title: An Act to repeal divers Enactments rendered unnecessary by the Summary Jurisdiction Acts and other Acts relating to proceedings before Courts of Summary Jurisdiction, and to make further provision for the uniformity of Proceedings before those Courts.
- Citation: 47 & 48 Vict.. c. 43
- Introduced by: J. T. Hibbert MP (Commons)
- Territorial extent: United Kingdom

Dates
- Royal assent: 7 August 1884
- Commencement: 1 December 1884 (Note: Section 2.)
- Repealed: 1 June 1953
Other legislation
Amends	See § Repealed enactments
Repeals/revokes	See § Repealed enactments
Amended by	Interpretation Act 1889; Statute Law Revision Act 1898; Poor Law Act 1927; Justices of the Peace Act 1949; Magistrates' Courts Act 1952
Repealed by	Magistrates' Courts Act 1952
Relates to	Summary Jurisdiction Act 1848; Quarter Sessions Act 1849; Summary Jurisdiction Act 1879

Status: Repealed

History of passage through Parliament

Records of Parliamentary debate relating to the statute from Hansard

Text of statute as originally enacted

The Summary Jurisdiction Act 1884 (47 & 48 Vict.. c. 43), also known as the Summary Jurisdiction (Repeal) Act 1884, was an act of the Parliament of the United Kingdom that clarified the Summary Jurisdiction Acts as amended by the Summary Jurisdiction Act 1879 (42 & 43 Vict.) and repealed for England and Wales statutes from 1691 to 1882.

== Background ==
In the United Kingdom, acts of Parliament remain in force until expressly repealed. Blackstone's Commentaries on the Laws of England, published in the late 18th-century, raised questions about the system and structure of the common law and the poor drafting and disorder of the existing statute book.

In 1806, the Commission on Public Records passed a resolution requesting the production of a report on the best mode of reducing the volume of the statute book. From 1810 to 1825, The Statutes of the Realm was published, providing for the first time the authoritative collection of acts. In 1816, both Houses of Parliament, passed resolutions that an eminent lawyer with 20 clerks be commissioned to make a digest of the statutes, which was declared "very expedient to be done." However, this was never done.

On 16 March 1824, the Select Committee on the Criminal Law in England was appointed to consider the expediency of consolidating and amending the criminal law. The Select Committee reported on 2 April 1824, resolving to consolidate the criminal law under several heads and to bring in bills to do so.

In 1827, Peel's Acts were passed to modernise, consolidate and repeal provisions of the criminal law, territorially limited to England and Wales and Scotland, including:

- Criminal Statutes Repeal Act 1827 (7 & 8 Geo. 4. c. 27), which repealed for England and Wales over 140 enactments relating to the criminal law.
- Criminal Law Act 1827 (7 & 8 Geo. 4. c. 28), which modernised the administration of criminal justice.
- Larceny Act 1827 (7 & 8 Geo. 4. c. 29), which consolidated provisions in the law relating to larceny.
- Malicious Injuries to Property Act 1827 (7 & 8 Geo. 4. c. 30), which consolidated provisions in the law relating to malicious injuries to property.

In 1828, parallel bills for Ireland to Peel's Acts were introduced, becoming:

- Criminal Statutes (Ireland) Repeal Act 1828 (9 Geo. 4. 54), which repealed for Ireland over 140 enactments relating to the criminal law.
- Criminal Law (Ireland) Act 1828 (9 Geo. 4. 54), which modernised the administration of criminal justice.
- Larceny (Ireland) Act 1828 (9 Geo. 4. c. 55) which consolidated provisions in the law relating to larceny.
- Malicious Injuries to Property (Ireland) Act 1828 (9 Geo. 4. c. 56), which consolidated provisions in the law relating to malicious injuries to property.

In 1828, the Offences Against the Person Act 1828 (9 Geo. 4. c. 31) was passed, which consolidated provisions in the law relating to offences against the person and repealed for England and Wales almost 60 related statutes. In 1829, the Offences Against the Person (Ireland) Act 1829 (10 Geo. 4. c. 34) was passed, which consolidated provisions in the law relating to offences against the person and repealed for Ireland almost 60 enactments relating to the Criminal law.

By 1848, the institution of Justice of the Peace in England and Wales had fallen into disrepute in some legal circles and was dealing with a rapidly increasing case load, its statutory basis dating back to the sixteenth century. In 1848, John Jervis MP was responsible for sponsoring, drafting and all but single-handedly guiding through the House of Commons three acts, known as Jervis's Acts, to reform the criminal and civil roles of a Justice of the Peace in England and Wales:

- Indictable Offences Act 1848 (11 & 12 Vict.. c. 42)
- Summary Jurisdiction Act 1848 (11 & 12 Vict.. c. 43)
- Justices Protection Act 1848 (11 & 12 Vict.. c. 44)

The acts were immediately praised for their work reforming the administration of criminal justice in England and were compared favourably in impact to Peel's Acts and Lord Lansdowne's Acts.

The Summary Jurisdiction Acts, including the Summary Jurisdiction Act 1848 (11 & 12 Vict.. c. 43), Quarter Sessions Act 1849 (12 & 13 Vict.. c. 45) and Summary Jurisdiction Act 1879 (42 & 43 Vict.), reformed the procedure before courts of summary jurisdiction and on appeals from those courts to courts of quarter sessions. This rendered many statutes obsolete.

== Passage ==
Leave to bring in the Summary Jurisdiction (Repeal, &c.) Bill was granted to J. T. Hibbert MP and the home secretary Sir William Harcourt MP on 7 February 1884. The bill had its first reading in the House of Commons on 7 February 1884. The bill had its second reading in the House of Commons on 17 May 1884 and was committed to a committee of the whole house,. The committee was discharged and the Bill was committed to a select committee, which reported on 24 June 1884, with amendments. The amended Bill had its third reading in the House of Commons on 24 June 1884 and passed, without amendments.

The bill had its first reading in the House of Lords on 26 June 1884. The bill had its second reading in the House of Lords on 3 July 1884 and was committed to a committee of the whole house, which met on 18 July 1884 and reported on 22 July 1884, with amendments. The amended bill had its third reading in the House of Lords on 22 July 1884 and passed, without amendments.

The amended bill was considered and agreed to by the House of Commons on 29 July 1884.

The bill was granted royal assent on 7 August 1884.

== Subsequent developments ==
Courtenay Ilbert described this act as an "expurgatory act".

Section 7 of the act was repealed by section 41 of, and the schedule to, the Interpretation Act 1889 (52 & 53 Vict.. c. 63), which came into force on 1 January 1890.

The preamble, section 2, section 3 to "enacted that", section 4 from "and (3) This repeal" to "not passed", section 5 to "enacted that", and from "And for the further" to "declared that", section 8 to "declared that" (occurring first), and from "and for the" to "declared that", section 12 to "enacted that" and the schedule were repealed by section 1 of, and the first part of the schedule to, the Statute Law Revision Act 1898 (61 & 62 Vict. c. 22), which came into force on 25 July 1898.

Section 11 was repealed by section 245(1) of, and the eleenth schedule to, the Poor Law Act 1927 (17 & 18 Geo. 5. c. 14), which came into force on 1 October 1927.

The whole act was repealed by section 132(1) of, and the sixth schedule to, the Magistrates' Courts Act 1952 (15 & 16 Geo. 6 & 1 Eliz. 2. c. 55), which came into force on 1 June 1953.

== Provisions ==
Section 1 of the act provided that the act may be cited as the Summary Jurisdiction Act, 1884.

Section 2 of the act provided that the act would come into force on 1 December 1884.

Section 3 of the act abolished corporal punishment, specifically whipping, as a penalty for non-payment of financial obligations ordered by courts of summary jurisdiction in England. The provision explicitly maintained imprisonment (with or without hard labour) as a permissible punishment, while removing all other forms of physical punishment that were previously available to the courts for enforcing monetary judgments.

Section 4 of the act repealed 141 enactments, listed in the schedule to the act, limited to England and Wales. Section 4 of the act included several safeguards to ensure that the repeal does not negatively affect existing rights or ongoing legal matters.

Section 4(2) of the act provided that the expression in the said “ schedule conviction or order of a court of summary jurisdiction” shall mean a conviction or order made in pursuance of the Summary Jurisdiction Acts. The expression "conviction or order of a court of summary jurisdiction" referred to in section 4(2) appears in the entries in the Schedule relating to section 17 of the Parish Apprentices Act 1816 (56 Geo. 3. c. 139), section 87 of the Turnpike Roads Act 1823. (4 Geo. 4. c. 95), section 105 of the Highway Act 1835 (5 & 6 Will. 4. c. 50) and section 269 of the Public Health Act 1875 (38 & 39 Vict. c. 55) which were repealed so far as they related to an appeal against a conviction or order of a court of summary jurisdiction.

Section 5 of the act addressed potential ambiguities regarding the application of Summary Jurisdiction Acts following the legislation's repeals. The section preserved justices' authority to act summarily in matters referenced in repealed enactments and established that Summary Jurisdiction Acts would apply to proceedings where previous procedures had been repealed. Additionally, it clarified that sections 19 and 21 of the Summary Jurisdiction Act 1848 (11 & 12 Vict.. c. 43), as amended by the Summary Jurisdiction Act 1879 (42 & 43 Vict.), would govern the recovery of penalties and fines in cases where statutes authorized imprisonment as a sole or alternative punishment.

Section 6 of the act standardised the appeals process for decisions made under the Summary Jurisdiction Acts. The section specified that where a person was authorized by any act passed before the Summary Jurisdiction Act 1879 (42 & 43 Vict.) to appeal from a conviction, order, or refusal of a court of summary jurisdiction, they would now be required to appeal to a court of general or quarter sessions subject to the conditions and regulations established in the 1879 Act.

Section 7 of the act clarified the definition of "court of summary jurisdiction" originally established in section 50 of the Summary Jurisdiction Act 1879 (42 & 43 Vict.). The section addressed doubts about whether this definition extended to justices and magistrates when acting under legislation other than the Summary Jurisdiction Acts. It explicitly declared that the definition included any justice, justices of the peace, or magistrate, regardless of whether they were acting under the Summary Jurisdiction Acts, other Acts, by virtue of their commission, or under common law.

Section 8 of the act addressed two key matters regarding petty sessional court-houses. First, it clarified that under section 30 of the Summary Jurisdiction Act 1879 (42 & 43 Vict.), justices or councils had the authority to establish multiple petty sessional court-houses if deemed necessary or expedient, resolving previous doubts about this power. Second, it established that these court-houses could be located outside their designated petty sessional division, either within the same county or in adjoining counties or boroughs. When justices acted in such court-houses, they would be considered to be operating within their own county and petty sessional division, ensuring their jurisdictional authority remained intact regardless of the physical location of the court.

Section 9 of the act provided that nothing in section 227 of the Municipal Corporations Act 1882. (45 & 46 Vict.. c. 50) should be taken to have repealed section 38 of the Summary Jurisdiction Act 1879 (42 & 43 Vict.).

Section 10 provided that nothing in the act was to alter the procedure for the recovery of or any remedy for the non-payment of any poor rate. Section 2(3) of the Rating and Valuation Act 1925 (15 & 16 Geo. 5. c. 90) provided that all enactments relating to the poor rate which were in force at the commencement of that act, including (subject to the provisions of that act) enactments relating to repeals against a poor rate, were, so far as not repealed by that act, to apply to the general rate.

Section 11 of the act provided that nothing in the act shall alter the procedure for the recovery of or any remedy for the non-payment of any poor rate, or of any rate or sum of payment not adjudged by the conviction or order of a court of summary jurisdiction.

Section 12 of the act provided that a form authorised by any rules for the time being in force in pursuance of section 29 of the Summary Jurisdiction Act 1879 (42 & 43 Vict.) shall be of the same effect as if it were contained in the Summary Jurisdiction Act 1848 (11 & 12 Vict.. c. 43), or in any other act to which the form is made applicable.

=== Repealed enactments ===
Citation	Short title	Title	Extent of repeal
3 Will. & Mar.. c. 11	Poor Relief Act 1691	An Act for the better explanation and supplying the defects of the former laws for the settlement of the poor.	Section nine from "to be levied" to end of section.
7 & 8 Will. 3. c. 6	Recovery of Small Tithes Act 1695	An Act for the more easy recoverie of small tythes.	Section two from "and alsoe" to end of section. Section three. Section four. Section seven from "to be held" to "just and reasonable." Section nine. Section ten, and Section twelve.
1 Anne, Stat. 2. c. 22	Woollen Manufactures Act 1702	An Act for the more effectual preventing the abuses and frauds of persons employed in the working up the woollen, linen, fustian, cotton, and iron manufactures of this kingdom.	In section one the words "publicly whipped and," and Section four from "which shall be held" to end of section.
9 Geo. 1. c. 27	Frauds by Journeymen Shoemakers Act 1722	An Act for preventing journeymen shoemakers selling, exchanging, or pawning boots, shoes, slippers, cut leather, or other materials for making boots, shoes, or slippers, and for better regulating the said journeymen.	Section one from "and upon the neglecting" to "offence shall be committed," and from "nor less than fourteen days" to end of section. Section two from "or else be subject" to end of section, and Section five from "to be holden" to "appeal."
12 Geo. 1. c. 34	Woollen Manufactures Act 1725	An Act to prevent unlawful combinations of workmen employed in the woollen manufactures, and for better payment of their wages.	Section two from "by warrant" to "respective jurisdictions," and from "for any time" to end of section. Section three from "and for want of sufficient" to end of section, and Section five from "to be holden" to end of section.
11 Geo. 2. c. 19	Distress for Rent Act 1737	An Act for the more effectual securing the payment of rents and preventing frauds by tenants.	Section four from "without bail" to end of section, and Section five from "to be held" to end of section.
12 Geo. 2. c. 28	Gaming Act 1738	An Act for the more effectual preventing of excessive and deceitful gaming.	Section five from "for the said county" to end of section. Section six from "be set aside" to "conviction or judgment", and Section eight.
13 Geo. 2. c. 8	Frauds of Workmen Act 1739	An Act to explain and amend an Act made in the first year of the reign of Her late Majesty Queen Anne, intituled "An Act for the more effectual preventing the abuses and frauds of persons employed in the working up the woollen, linen, fustian, cotton, and iron manufactures of this kingdom," and for extending the said Act to the manufactures of leather.	In section one, the words "whipped and", and from "for any time not exceeding three months" to end of section. Section four from "and shall be there likewise" to "order and direct", and from "for any time not exceeding three months" to end of section, and Section nine from "to be held" to end of section.
15 Geo. 2. c. 27	Thefts of Cloth, etc. Act 1741	An Act for the more effectual preventing any cloth or woollen goods remaining upon the rack or tenters, or any woollen yarn or wooll left out to dry, from being stolen or taken away in the nighttime.	Section one from "and in default of payment" to "they pay the same", and Section two from "which shall happen" to end of section.
19 Geo. 2. c. 21	Profane Oaths Act 1745	An Act more effectually to prevent profane cursing and swearing.	Section two. Section five. Section six. Section seven, the words "for the space of one month". Section eight, from "in the words and form" down to "day and year aforesaid", and the words "said form and" and from "and the said justice" to the end of the section. Section ten from "and that all charges" to end of section, and Section fourteen.
22 Geo. 2. c. 27	Frauds by Workmen Act 1748	An Act for the more effectual preventing of frauds and abuses committed by persons employed in the manufacture of hats, and in the woollen, linen, fustian, cotton, iron, leather, furr, hemp, flax, mohair, and silk manufactures;	Section one from "there to be kept to hard labour for the space" to end of section. Section two from "and in case the said forfeiture" to end of section. Section six from "notice in writing" to end of section.
27 Geo. 2. c. 7	Frauds in Manufacture of Clocks, etc. Act 1754	An Act for the more effectual preventing of frauds and abuses committed by persons employed in the manufacture of clocks and watches.	Section one from "unless such forfeiture" to the first "respectively committed", and from "for any time not exceeding three months" to end of section. Section two from the first "unless the said forfeiture" to the first "appear reasonable", and from "for any time not exceeding three months", to "appear reasonable." Section three from "the person so convicted" to end of section. Section four from "in the form and words" down to "day and year aforesaid," the words "said form and" and from "and the said justice" to the end of the section, and Section five.
5 Geo. 3. c. 51	Cloth Manufacture, Yorkshire Act 1765	An Act for repealing several laws relating to the manufacture of woollen cloth in the county of York, and also so much of several other laws as prescribes particular standards of width and length of such woollen cloths; and for substituting other regulations of the cloth trade within the West Riding of the said county, for preventing frauds in certifying the contents of the cloth, and for preserving the credit of the said manufacture at the foreign market.	In section eleven the words "nor less than forty shillings". In section twenty-four the words "for any time not exceeding three months", and Section twenty-five from "to be held" to end of section.
14 Geo. 3. c. 25	Frauds, etc., in Woollen Manufacturers Act 1774	An Act for the more effectual preventing frauds and embezzlements by persons employed in the woollen manufactory.	Section seven from "to be held" to end of section. Section eight, and Section nine.
14 Geo. 3. c. 44	Reeling False or Short Yarn Act 1774	An Act the title of which begins with the words—"An Act to amend an Act" and ends with words—"payment of their wages."	Section two, the words "nor less than five shillings". Section three. Section four, and In section five, the words "at the time of such conviction", and from "abide the order of" down to "adjudged by the justices of such sessions", and from "and may affirm" to "all intents and purposes".
15 Geo. 3. c. 14	Reeling False or Short Yarn Act 1775	An Act the title of which begins with the words—"An Act to explain and amend," and ends with the words —"payment of their wages."	The whole act.
17 Geo. 3. c. 11	Worsted Act 1776	An Act for more effectually preventing frauds and abuses committed by persons employed in the manufactures of combing wool, worsted, yarn, and goods made from worsted in the counties of York, Lancaster, and Chester.	So much of section twelve as applies any enactment repealed by this Act. Section twenty. Section twenty-one from "to be held for the county" to the end of the section. Section twenty-two, down to "judgment be affirmed and", and Section twenty-three.
17 Geo. 3. c. 29	Adulteration of Tea Act 1776	An Act for the more effectual prevention of the manufacturing of ash, elder, sloe, and other leaves in imitation of tea, and to prevent frauds in the revenue of excise in respect to tea.	Section one from "there to remain" to end of section. Section two from "there to remain" to end of section. Section three from "there to remain" to end of section. Section eight, and Section nine, from "shall be certified by" down to "which said conviction."
17 Geo. 3. c. 55	Manufacture of Hats Act 1776	An Act for the better regulating the hat manufactory.	Section three, and Section eight from "to be held" to end of section.
17 Geo. 3. c. 56	Frauds by Workmen Act 1777	An Act for amending and rendering more effectual the several laws now in being for the more effectual preventing of frauds and abuses by persons employed in the manufacture of hats, and in the woollen, linen, fustian, cotton, iron, leather, fur, hemp, flax, mohair, and silk manufactures, and also for making provisions to prevent frauds by journeymen dyers.	Section three from "for any time" to end of section. Section four from "for any time" to end of section. Section fourteen from "all which said respective forfeitures" to "adjudged guilty," and from "and if no sufficient distress" to end of section. Section seventeen from "to remain for any time" to end of section. Section twenty from "to be holden" to end of section. Section twenty-one, and Section twenty-two from "and the justices before whom" to the end of the section.
24 Geo. 3. Sess. 2. c. 3	Woollen Manufactures, Suffolk Act 1784	An Act for more effectually preventing frauds and abuses committed by persons employed in the manufactures of combing wool, worsted yarn, and goods made from worsted, in the county of Suffolk.	Section twenty-two. Section twenty-three from "to be held" to end of section. Section twenty-four, down to "judgment be affirmed and", and Section twenty-five.
25 Geo. 3. c. 40	Woollen, etc., Manufactures, Bedfordshire Act 1785	An Act for more effectually preventing frauds and abuses committed by persons employed in the manufactures of combing wool, worsted yarn, and goods made from worsted, in the counties of Bedford, Huntington, Northampton, Leicester, Rutland, and Lincoln, and the Isle of Ely.	Section thirty. Section thirty-one from "to be held" to end of section. Section thirty-two down to "judgment be affirmed and", and Section thirty-three
26 Geo. 3. c. 71	Knackers Act 1786	An Act for regulating houses and other places kept for the purpose of slaughtering horses.	Section ten the words "nor less than ten pounds" and from "for any time" to end of section. Section eleven. Section thirteen, the words "nor less than ten pounds", and from "there to remain" to end of section. Section fifteen, the words "nor less than ten pounds", and Section sixteen.
31 Geo. 3. c. 56	Woollen, etc., Manufactures, Norfolk Act 1791	An Act more effectually to prevent abuses and frauds committed by persons employed in the manufactures of combing wool and worsted yarn in the county of Norfolk and city of Norwich and county of the said city.	Section twenty-six from "for any term" to end of section. Section twenty-seven. Section twenty-eight from "to be held" to "judgment be affirmed", and Section twenty-nine.
32 Geo. 3. c. 56	Servants' Characters Act 1792	An Act for preventing the counterfeiting of certificates of the characters of servants.	Section six, the words "the sum of ten shillings for," and from "without bail" to end of section. Section nine, and Section ten from "to be held" to "all intents and purposes".
32 Geo. 3. c. 57	Parish Apprentices Act 1792	An Act for the further regulation of parish apprentices.	Section eleven, Section twelve, and Section thirteen.
33 Geo. 3. c. 55	Parish Officers Act 1793	An Act to authorise justices of the peace to impose fines upon constables, overseers, and other peace or parish officers for neglect of duty, and on masters of apprentices for ill-usage of such their apprentices, and also to make provision for the execution of warrants of distress granted by magistrates.	Section one from "and by warrant" to "offender or offenders", and from "to be held" to end of section, and Section two.
36 Geo. 3. c. 60	Metal Button Act 1796	An Act to regulate the making and vending of metal buttons, and to prevent the purchasers thereof from being deceived in the real quality of such buttons.	Section eight from "and to award" to end of section. Section nine from "upon giving" to "affirmed", and from "for the county" to end of section. Section ten from "Provided that such penalties". Section eleven, Section twelve, and Section thirteen.
36 Geo. 3. c. 85	Mills Act 1796	An Act for the better regulation of mills.	Section eight from "and in case" to "paid and satisfied", and from "upon giving security" to "judgment shall be affirmed", and from "for the county" to "themselves shall seem meet", and
36 Geo. 3. c. 88	Hay and Straw Act 1796	An Act to regulate the buying and selling of hay and straw, and for repealing so much of two Acts made in the second year of the reign of King William and Queen Mary, and in the thirty-first year of the reign of King George the Second, as relate to the buying and selling of hay and straw within the limits therein mentioned.	Section twenty-two from "without bail" to end of section. Section twenty-six from "to summon the person" down to "authorised and required", and from "to be ascertained" to end of section. Section twenty-eight, to "person shall reside", and from "and if it shall" to end of section, and Section twenty-nine from "of the county" to "such appeal with effect."
39 Geo. 3. c. 79	Unlawful Societies Act 1799	An Act for the more effectual suppression of societies established for seditious and treasonable purposes, and for better preventing treasonable and seditious practices.	Section eight from "and in case such sum" to "three calendar months". Section nine from "so as such punishment" to end of section. Section thirty-five from "and in case such last-mentioned penalty" to end of section. In section thirty-eight, the words "convictions by any justice or justices of the peace for offences against this Act, and", and Form of conviction in schedule.
39 & 40 Geo. 3. c. 77	Collieries and Mines Act 1800	An Act for the security of collieries and mines, and for the better regulation of colliers and miners.	Section eight, and Section ten from "to be held in and for" to "as they shall judge reasonable".
41 Geo. 3. (U.K.) c. 109	Inclosure (Consolidation) Act 1801	An Act for consolidating in one Act certain provisions usually inserted in Acts of Inclosure; and for facilitating the mode of proving the several facts usually required on the passing of such Acts.	Section thirty-nine from "for which purpose" to "reasonable costs."
42 Geo. 3. c. 46	Parish Apprentices Act 1802	An Act to require overseers and guardians of the poor to keep a register of the several children who shall be bound or assigned by them as apprentices; and to extend the provisions of an Act passed in the twentieth year of the reign of His present Majesty to the binding of apprentices by houses of industry or establishments for the poor which have been authorised so to do by subsequent Acts.	Section two from "to be recovered" to "selling such distress", and from "and in case sufficient distress" to end of section. Section four, and Section seven, the word "first", and from "to be holden" to end of section.
42 Geo. 3. c. 56	Medicines Stamp Act 1802	An Act to repeal an Act passed in the twenty-fifth year of the reign of His present Majesty for granting stamp duties on certain medicines, and for charging other duties in lieu thereof; and for making effectual provision for the better collection of the said duties.	Section twenty-five from "at any time" to "paid and satisfied", from "upon giving" to the first "named", and from "for the county" to end of section. Section twenty-six; and Section twenty-seven.
42 Geo. 3. c. 119	Gaming Act 1802	An Act to suppress certain games and lotteries not authorised by law.	Section six from "for any space of time" to end of section.
44 Geo. 3. c. 54	Yeomanry Act 1804	An Act to consolidate and amend the provisions of the several Acts relating to corps of yeomanry and volunteers in Great Britain; and to make further regulations relating thereto.	Section forty-five from "and if such offender" to end of section, and Section fifty-two from "to be levied" to "two months."
48 Geo. 3. c. 75	Burial of Drowned Persons Act 1808	An Act for providing suitable interment in churchyards or parochial burial grounds in England for such dead human bodies as may be cast on shore from the sea in cases of wreck or otherwise.	Section eight from "if not paid on conviction" to the first "such penalties and forfeitures", and from "and in case sufficient distress" to end of section. Section nine. Section ten, the word "first", and from "to be holden" to "judge proper". Section eleven.
52 Geo. 3. c. 155	Places of Religious Worship Act 1812	An Act to repeal certain Acts and amend other Acts relating to religious worship and assemblies, and persons teaching or preaching therein.	Section fifteen from "and in case" to end of section, and Section sixteen from "holden next" to "prefer such appeal."
54 Geo. 3. c. 159	Harbours Act 1814	An Act for the better regulation of the several ports, harbours, roadsteads, sounds, channels, bays, and navigable rivers in the United Kingdom, and of His Majesty's docks, dock yards, arsenals, wharfs, moorings, and stores therein; and for repealing several Acts passed for that purpose.	Section twenty-one from "there to remain" to end of section. Section twenty-three from "according to the following form" down to "division or place". Section twenty-four, and Section twenty-six from "holden" to end of section.
55 Geo. 3. c. 137	Poor Relief Act 1815	An Act the title of which begins with the words,—"An Act to prevent", and ends with the words,—"relating to the poor".	Section eight from "in the following form" down to "first above written", and Section nine from "to be held" to end of section.
56 Geo. 3. c. 139	Parish Apprentices Act 1816	An Act to regulate the binding of parish apprentices.	Section fourteen. Section fifteen. Section sixteen, and Section seventeen from "to be holden" to "shall think fit", so far as relates to an appeal against a conviction or order of a court of summary jurisdiction.
57 Geo. 3. c. 19	Seditious Meetings Act 1817	An Act for the more effectually preventing seditious meetings and assemblies.	Section thirty from "and in case such last - mentioned penalty" to the first "three calendar months". Section thirty-four from "convictions" to "against this Act, and"; and Forms I. and III. in Schedule.
57 Geo. 3. c. 93	Distress (Costs) Act 1817	An Act to regulate the costs of distresses levied for payment of small rents.	Section two from "and in case of nonpayment" to end of section. Section three. Section four to "original complaint". Section five and the Forms of order in schedule.
59 Geo. 3. c. 7	Cutlery Trade Act 1819	An Act to regulate the cutlery trade in England.	Section eight from "and all such justices" to end of section. Section nine from "upon giving" to "affirmed", and from "for the county" to end of section. Section ten from "provided that" to end of section. Section eleven, Section twelve, Section thirteen, and Section fifteen.
3 Geo. 4. c. 126	Turnpike Roads Act 1822	An Act to amend the general laws now in being for regulating turnpike roads in that part of Great Britain called England.	Section one hundred and thirty-eight. Section one hundred and forty-one from beginning of section to "sooner paid and satisfied". Section one hundred and forty-four so far as relates to a proceeding before a court of summary jurisdiction, and The forms numbered 17, 18, 19, 20, 21, 22 in the schedule.
4 Geo. 4. c. 60	Lotteries Act 1823	An Act for granting His Majesty a sum of money to be raised by lotteries.	Section thirty-eight, and Section sixty-seven, the words "nor less than one calendar month", and from "and any such adjudication" to "et cetera".
4 Geo. 4. c. 80	Lascars Act 1823	An Act the title of which begins with the words—"An Act to consolidate", and ends with the words,—" registered in India."	Section twenty-nine; and Section thirty.
4 Geo. 4. c. 95	Turnpike Roads Act 1823	An Act to explain and amend an Act passed in the third year of the reign of His present Majesty, to amend the general laws now in being for regulating turnpike roads in that part of Great Britain called England.	Section eighty-three, and Section eighty-seven from "to be held" to "intents and purposes", and from "Provided always, that in case" to "determined", so far as relates to an appeal against a conviction or order of a court of summary jurisdiction.
5 Geo. 4. c. 88	East India Company Act 1824	An Act for the punishment of idle and disorderly persons, and rogues and vagabonds, in that part of Great Britain called England.	Section seven. Section eleven from "and in case such offender" to end of section. Section fourteen from "for the county" to end of section, and Section seventeen.
6 Geo. 4. c. 50	Juries Act 1825	An Act for consolidating and amending the laws relative to jurors and juries.	Section fifty-six, and Section fifty-seven from "and that where any distress" to the end of the section.
9 Geo. 4. c. 69	Night Poaching Act 1828	An Act for the more effectual prevention of persons going armed by night for the destruction of game.	Section three. Section four so far as relates to an offence punishable upon summary conviction. Section five. Section six from "which shall be holden" to end of section; and Section seven from "and no warrant" to end of section.
1 & 2 Will. 4. c. 22	London Hackney Carriage Act 1831	An Act to amend the laws relating to hackney carriages, and to waggons, carts, and drays used in the Metropolis; and to place the collection of the duties on hackney carriages and on hawkers and pedlars in England under the Commissioners of Stamps.	Section twenty-seven from "there to remain" to end of section. Section fifty-six, the words "for any time not exceeding two calendar months". Section sixty-five and Schedule D. Section sixty-nine, and Section seventy from "provided that" to end of section.
1 & 2 Will. 4. c. 32	Game Act 1831	An Act to amend the laws in England relative to game.	Section thirty-eight from "and for any term" to end of section. Section thirty-nine. Section forty. Section forty-one from "and that where" to end of section. Section forty-three. Section forty-four from "to be holden" to end of section, and Section forty-five from "and that no warrant" to end of section.
1 & 2 Will. 4. c. 37	Truck Act 1831	An Act to prohibit the payment in certain trades of wages in goods, or otherwise than in the current coin of the realm.	In section nine the words "nor less than five pounds". Section ten from "and in case of a second offence" to "court and jury". Section eleven. Section twelve. Section fifteen. Section sixteen. Section seventeen from "and no warrant of distress" to end of section, and Schedule.
1 & 2 Will. 4. c. 41	Special Constables Act 1831	An Act for amending the laws relative to the appointment of special constables, and for the better preservation of the peace.	Section sixteen to "such distress; and," Section seventeen, and Section eighteen from "and that no warrant" to end of section.
2 & 3 Will. 4. c. 120	Stage Carriages Act 1832	An Act to repeal the duties under the management of the Commissioners of Stamps, and on horses let for hire in Great Britain, and to grant other duties in lieu thereof, and also to consolidate and amend the laws relating thereto.	Section one hundred and three from "and it shall be lawful" to "paid and satisfied", and from "for the county" to "affirmed on the hearing of such appeal". Section one hundred and five from "provided that" to end of section. Section one hundred and eight. Section one hundred and ten. Section one hundred and eleven. Section one hundred and thirteen and Schedule B.
3 & 4 Will. 4. c. 90	Lighting and Watching Act 1833	An Act to repeal an Act of the eleventh year of His late Majesty King George the Fourth, for the lighting and watching of parishes in England and Wales, and to make other provisions in lieu thereof.	Section sixty-two, and Section sixty-three from "who are hereby" to "seized and distrained", from "it shall be lawful" to "otherwise, but", and from "without bail" to end of section.
4 & 5 Will. 4. c. 76	Poor Law Amendment Act 1834	An Act for the amendment and better administration of the laws relating to the poor in England and Wales.	Section ninety-two from "or house of correction" to end of section. Section ninety-three from "or house of correction" to "unless such penalty shall be sooner paid." Section one hundred and two, and Section one hundred and three from "either of which court of sessions" to end of section.
5 & 6 Will. 4. c. 50	Highway Act 1835	An Act to consolidate and amend the laws relating to highways in that part of Great Britain called England.	Section seventy-five from "for any time" to end of section. Section ninety-seven. Section one hundred and one. Section one hundred and two. Section one hundred and three from "by warrant under" to "nulla bona returned thereon", and from "for any term" to "paid and satisfied". Section one hundred and four. Section one hundred and five from "to be held" to end of section so far as regards an appeal from a conviction or order of a court of summary jurisdiction, and The forms numbered 20, 21, 22, 23, 24, 25 in the schedule.
6 & 7 Will. 4. c. 11	Registration of Aliens Act 1836	An Act for the registration of aliens, and to repeal an Act passed in the seventh year of the reign of His late Majesty for that purpose.	Section ten from "prosecuted within six" to "offences shall be", and from "for any time" to "twenty pounds".
6 & 7 Will. 4. c. 37	Bread Act 1836	An Act to repeal the several Acts now in force relating to bread to be sold out of the city of London and the liberties thereof, and beyond the weekly bills of mortality and ten miles of the Royal Exchange; and to provide other regulations for the making and sale of bread, and for preventing the adulteration of meal, flour, and bread beyond the limits aforesaid.	In section eight, the words "nor less than five pounds" and "for any time not exceeding six calendar months". In section nine from "less than five pounds" to end of section. Section twelve, the words "nor less than forty shillings," and "for any time not exceeding six calendar months." Section thirteen from "nor less than ten days" to end of section. Section seventeen from "which warrant such magistrate" to "recognizance or otherwise", and from "and the other moiety" to end of section. Section eighteen. Section nineteen. Section twenty. Section twenty-one. Section twenty-two. Section twenty-three. Section twenty-four from "and where any distress" to end of section, and Section twenty-five from "the person or persons so convicted" to end of section, and Section twenty-six.
6 & 7 Will. 4. c. 86	Births and Deaths Registration Act 1836	An Act for registering births, deaths, and marriages in England.	Section forty-six from "which shall be holden" to end of section, and Section forty-seven from "and no warrant" to end of section.
7 Will. 4 & 1 Vict.. c. 36	Post Office (Offences) Act 1837	An Act for consolidating the laws relative to offences against the Post Office of the United Kingdom, and for regulating the judicial administration of the Post Office laws, and for explaining certain terms and expressions employed in those laws.	Section eleven. Section thirteen from "and any such justice" to "sooner paid," and from "for the county" to "affirmed on the hearing of such appeal." Section fourteen from "provided that" to end of section. Section seventeen. Section nineteen. Section twenty. Section twenty-one. Section twenty-two, and Section forty-five and Schedule.
2 & 3 Vict.. c. 71	Metropolitan Police Courts Act 1839	An Act for regulating the police courts in the metropolis.	Section forty-four. Section forty-five. Section forty-eight. Section fifty from "to be holden" down to "by the last-mentioned justices awarded". Section fifty-one, so far as relates to a conviction or order.
3 & 4 Vict.. c. 50	Canals (Offences) Act 1840	An Act to provide for keeping the peace on canals and navigable rivers.	Section fifteen from "for a term" to "recovery thereof". Section sixteen. Section seventeen from "and that on warrant" to end of section, and Section nineteen from "to be holden" to "by the last-mentioned justices awarded."
3 & 4 Vict.. c. 84	Metropolitan Police Courts Act 1840	An Act for better defining the powers of justices within the Metropolitan police district.	Section eight from "and when the information" to end of section, and Schedule.
3 & 4 Vict.. c. 85	Chimney Sweepers and Chimneys Regulation Act 1840	An Act for the regulation of chimney sweepers and chimneys.	Section ten. Section eleven from "which shall be holden" to "process for enforcing such judgment", and Section twelve from "and no warrant" to end of section.
3 & 4 Vict.. c. 97	Railway Regulation Act 1840	An Act for regulating railways	Section thirteen from "for such period" to end of section, and Section sixteen from "for any term" to end of section.
4 & 5 Vict.. c. 30	Ordnance Survey Act 1841	An Act to authorise and facilitate the completion of a survey of Great Britain, Berwick-upon-Tweed, and the Isle of Man.	Section eight from "and not less than" to end of section. Section eleven from "and not less than" to end of section, and Section thirteen from "to them for that purpose exhibited" to "paid or satisfied".
5 & 6 Vict.. c. 100	Copyright of Designs Act 1842	An Act to consolidate and amend the laws relating to the copyright of designs for ornamenting articles of manufacture.	Section eight from "and if the amount of such penalty" to the end of the Form of Conviction, and Section thirteen.
5 & 6 Vict.. c. 109	Parish Constables Act 1842	An Act for the appointment and payment of parish constables.	Section twenty-four.
6 & 7 Vict.. c. 30	Pound-breach Act 1843	An Act to amend the law relating to pound-breach and rescue in certain cases.	Section one from "for any time" to "sooner paid". Section three and Section four.
6 & 7 Vict.. c. 40	Hosiery Act 1843	An Act to amend the laws for the prevention of frauds and abuses by persons employed in the woollen, worsted, linen, cotton, flax, mohair, and silk hosiery manufactures, and for further securing the property of the manufacturers and the wages of the workmen engaged therein.	Section two from "and in default" to "over to the person convicted", and from "for any term" to end of section. Section eleven from "and in default" to "over to the person convicted", and from "for any term" to end of section. Section twenty from "for any term" to end of section. Section twenty-two. Section twenty-three. Section twenty-four from "and that" to end of section. Section twenty-seven from "for any term not exceeding two" to end of section. Section twenty-eight. Section twenty-nine from "which shall be held" to end of section, and Section thirty from "and that no warrant" to end of section.
6 & 7 Vict.. c. 68	Theatres Act 1843	An Act for regulating theatres	Section nineteen from "by the oath or oaths" to end of section.
7 & 8 Vict.. c. 101	Poor Law Amendment Act 1844	An Act for the further Amendment of the Laws relating to the Poor in England.	Section four from "if within twenty-four hours" down to "some one justice of the peace", and from "to be holden after" to the end of the section.
7 & 8 Vict.. c. 87	Knackers Act 1844	An Act to amend the law for regulating places kept for slaughtering horses.	Section seven from "or prison" to end of section, and Section nine from "to be holden" to "by the last-mentioned justices awarded".
8 & 9 Vict.. c. 10	Bastardy Act 1845	An Act to make certain Provisions for Proceedings in Bastardy.	Section three.
8 & 9 Vict.. c. 16	Companies Clauses Consolidation Act 1845	The Companies Clauses Consolidation Act, 1845.	Section one hundred and forty-seven from "and on complaint" to end of section. Section one hundred and forty-eight. Section one hundred and forty-nine. Section one hundred and fifty-three. Section one hundred and fifty-five, so far as relates to any matter to which the Summary Jurisdiction Acts apply. Section one hundred and fifty-seven. Section one hundred and fifty-nine from "for the county" to the end of the section, and Schedule G.
8 & 9 Vict.. c. 18	Lands Clauses Consolidation Act 1845	The Lands Clauses Consolidation Act, 1845.	Section one hundred and thirty-six from "and on complaint" to end of section. Section one hundred and thirty-seven. Section one hundred and forty-two. Section one hundred and forty-three, so far as relates to any matter to which the Summary Jurisdiction Acts apply. Section one hundred and forty-four. Section one hundred and forty-six from "for the county" to end of section, and Schedule (C.)
8 & 9 Vict.. c. 20	Railways Clauses Consolidation Act 1845	The Railways Clauses Consolidation Act, 1845.	Section one hundred and forty-five from "and on complaint" to end of section. Section one hundred and forty-six. Section one hundred and forty-seven. Section one hundred and fifty-one. Section one hundred and fifty-three so far as relates to any matter to which the Summary Jurisdiction Acts apply. Section one hundred and fifty-five. Section one hundred and fifty-seven from "for the county" to end of section and Schedule.
8 & 9 Vict.. c. 77	Hosiery Act 1845	An Act to make further regulations respecting the tickets of work to be delivered to persons employed in the manufacture of hosiery in certain cases.	Section five. Section six. Section seven to "over to the person convicted" and Section eight from "and that when any distress" to the end of the section.
8 & 9 Vict.. c. 100	Lunacy Act 1845	An Act for the regulation of the care and treatment of lunatics.	Section one hundred and two from "and shall and may issue" to "sooner paid", and from "and the overplus" to the end of the section. Section one hundred and three, and Section one hundred and four from "the person appealing" to end of section.
8 & 9 Vict.. c. 109	Gaming Act 1845	An Act to amend the law concerning games and wagers.	Section eleven from "and on nonpayment" to "convicting justices", and Section twenty from "to be holden" to "by the last-mentioned court awarded".
9 & 10 Vict.. c. 95	County Courts Act 1846	An Act for the more easy recovery of small debts and demands in England.	Section one hundred and thirty-one. Section one hundred and thirty-two. Section one hundred and thirty-four. Section one hundred and thirty-five, and Section one hundred and thirty-six, so far as it relates to any order, judgment, or proceeding before a court of summary jurisdiction.
10 & 11 Vict.. c. 16	Commissioners Clauses Act 1847	The Commissioners Clauses Act, 1847.	Section seventy-one from "and if he fail" to end of section.
10 & 11 Vict.. c. 38	Land Drainage Act 1847	An Act to facilitate the drainage of land in England and Wales.	Section sixteen and Section seventeen.
10 & 11 Vict.. c. 62	Naval Deserters Act 1847	An Act for the establishment of naval prisons, and for the prevention of desertion from Her Majesty's Navy.	Section thirteen from "for any term" to "costs". Section fourteen, except so far as it applies to a proceeding under section nine; and Section fifteen.
11 & 12 Vict.. c. 43	Summary Jurisdiction Act 1848	An Act to facilitate the performance of the duties of justices of the peace out of sessions within England and Wales with respect to summary convictions and orders.	Section nine from "provided always that in all cases" to the end of the section. Section twelve from "and if there be" to "shall have arisen", so far as the same relates to a case arising under the Summary Jurisdiction Acts or any future Act. Section thirteen from "and if such defendant shall not afterwards appear" down to "evidence of such non-appearance of the said defendant." Section sixteen from "provided always that in all cases" to the end of the section. So much of section seventeen as specifies any form of conviction or order for which another form is provided by a rule under the Summary Jurisdiction Acts. Section nineteen from "provided always" to the end of the section. Section twenty from "provided always that in all cases" to the end of the section. The references (S.1.) and (S.2.) in section twenty-seven and the forms (S.1.) and (S.2.) in the schedule.
12 & 13 Vict.. c. 14	Distress for Rates Act 1849	An Act to enable overseers of the poor and surveyors of the highways to recover the costs of distraining for rates.	Section nine.
12 & 13 Vict.. c. 45	Quarter Sessions Act 1849	An Act to amend the procedure in courts of general and quarter sessions of the peace in England and Wales, and for the better advancement of justice in cases within the jurisdiction of those courts.	Section one so far as relates to any appeal against an order of a court of summary jurisdiction.
12 & 13 Vict.. c. 92	Cruelty to Animals Act 1849	An Act for the more effectual prevention of cruelty to animals.	Section fourteen from "upon the complaint of any person" to end of section. Section fifteen. Section sixteen. Section seventeen. Section twenty-three. Section twenty-four. Section twenty-five from "which shall be holden" to end of section, and Section twenty-six from "and no warrant" to end of section.
15 & 16 Vict.. c. 81	County Rates Act 1852	An Act to consolidate and amend the statutes relating to the assessment and collection of county rates in England and Wales.	Section forty-six.
16 & 17 Vict.. c. 33	London Hackney Carriage Act 1853	An Act for the better regulation of metropolitan stage and hackney carriages, and for prohibiting the use of advertising vehicles.	In section three the words "for any time not exceeding one month". In section seventeen the words "for any time not exceeding one calendar month", and In section nineteen from "for any time" to end of section. In section twenty-three the words "for any time not exceeding six months."
16 & 17 Vict.. c. 73	Naval Volunteers Act 1853	An Act for the establishment of a body of Naval Coast Volunteers, and for the temporary transfer to the Navy in case of need of seafaring men employed in other public services.	
16 & 17 Vict.. c. 97	Lunatic Asylums Act 1853	The Lunatic Asylums Act, 1853	In section one hundred and twenty-eight the words "within four calendar months after such order or determination made or given", and from "the person appealing" to "thereupon", from "upon proof" to "quarter sessions, and", and from "and may order" to end of section.
16 & 17 Vict.. c. 119	Betting Act 1853	An Act for the suppression of betting houses.	So much of sections three and four as prescribes the term of imprisonment for nonpayment of penalty and costs. Section thirteen from "to be holden" to "by the last-mentioned court awarded". Section fourteen down to "merits of the case, and", and Section fifteen.
16 & 17 Vict.. c. 128	Smoke Abatement, London Act 1853	An Act to abate the nuisance arising from the smoke of furnaces in the metropolis, and from steam vessels above London Bridge.	Section one, the words "nor less than forty shillings". Section two, the words "nor less than forty shillings".
17 & 18 Vict.. c. 38	Gaming Houses Act 1854	An Act for the suppression of gaming houses.	So much of sections one, three, and four as prescribes the term of imprisonment for nonpayment of penalty and costs. Section ten from "to be holden" to "by the last-mentioned court awarded." Section eleven down to "merits of the case and", and Section twelve.
17 & 18 Vict.. c. 104	Merchant Shipping Act 1854	The Merchant Shipping Act, 1854.	Section five hundred and eighteen, sub-section (4), from "which is holden" to end of such sub-section.
18 & 19 Vict.. c. 119	Passengers Act 1855	The Passengers Act, 1855	Section eighty-five, the words "according to the form in "the Schedule (N.) hereto "annexed", from "or the justice before whom" to "costs of the proceedings", and from "for any term not exceeding three calendar "months" to "satisfied". Section eighty-seven, and Schedules (N.) and (O.)
18 & 19 Vict.. c. 120	Metropolis Management Act 1855	The Metropolis Management Act, 1855.	Section two hundred and thirty-one from "but no such appeal" to the end of the section, and Section two hundred and thirty-two, from "or they may confirm" to end of section.
22 & 23 Vict.. c. 40	Royal Naval Reserve (Volunteer) Act 1859	An Act for the establishment of a reserve volunteer force of seamen, and for the government of the same.	In section twenty-four the words "for any time not exceeding six months".
22 & 23 Vict.. c. 66	Sale of Gas Act 1859	An Act for regulating measures used in sales of gas.	Section twenty-two from "to be held" to "such city, borough, or county", and from "and may order" to the end of the section, so far as relates to any order, judgment, or determination of a justice of the peace, mayor, or chief magistrate.
23 & 24 Vict.. c. 32	Ecclesiastical Courts Jurisdiction Act 1860	An Act to abolish the jurisdiction of the ecclesiastical courts in Ireland in cases of defamation, and in England and Ireland in certain cases of brawling.	Section four from "which shall be holden" to end of section.
24 & 25 Vict.. c. 96	Larceny Act 1861	The Larceny Act, 1861	Section one hundred and five. Section one hundred and seven from "for any term not exceeding two months" to end of section. Section one hundred and ten from "which shall be holden" to the first "and the costs of the appeal;" and from "and the court at such sessions" to end of section. Section one hundred and eleven from "and no warrant" to end of section, and Section one hundred and twelve.
24 & 25 Vict.. c. 97	Malicious Damage Act 1861	An Act to consolidate and amend the Statute Law of England and Ireland relating to malicious injuries to property.	Section sixty-two. Section sixty-five from "for any term not exceeding two months" to end of section. Section sixty-eight from "which shall be holden" to the first "and the costs of the appeal;" and from "and the court at such sessions" to end of section. Section sixty-nine from "and no warrant" to end of section, and Section seventy.
24 & 25 Vict.. c. 99	Coinage Offences Act 1861	An Act to consolidate and amend the Statute Law of the United Kingdom against offences relating to coin.	Section thirty-two from "and no warrant" to end of section.
24 & 25 Vict.. c. 110	Old Metal Dealers Act 1861	The Old Metal Dealers Act, 1861	Section eleven from "which is holden" to "seem meet".
25 & 26 Vict.. c. 61	Highway Act 1862	An Act for the better management of highways in England.	Section forty-seven from "in manner provided" to end of section.
25 & 26 Vict.. c. 114	Poaching Prevention Act 1862	An Act for the prevention of poaching.	Section five from "and no warrant" to end of section, and Section six from "which shall be holden" to end of section.
26 & 27 Vict.. c. 65	Volunteer Act 1863	The Volunteer Act, 1863	Section forty-eight from "held not less" in sub-section (1) to "and of the appeal" at end of sub-section (3); and from "the court" at beginning of sub-section (5) to "Metropolitan Police District"; and from "and a warrant of commitment" to "sustain the same".
26 & 27 Vict.. c. 108	Vaccination (Scotland) Act 1863	An Act to amend the law in certain cases of misappropriation by servants of the property of their masters.	In section one the words "for any term not exceeding three months, unless such penalty be sooner paid". Section two from "which shall be holden" to "and the costs of the appeal"; and from "and the court at such sessions" to "evidence of such conviction", and Section three from "and no warrant" to end of section.
28 & 29 Vict.. c. 121	Salmon Fishery Act 1865	The Salmon Fishery Act, 1865	Section sixty-six from "for the county" to end of section.
31 & 32 Vict.. c. 45	Vice-Admiralty Courts Act Amendment Act 1867	The Sea Fisheries Act, 1868	Section fifty-eight from "in manner directed" to "be made", and from "for the county" to "either party".
32 & 33 Vict.. c. 112	Adulteration of Seeds Act 1869	The Adulteration of Seeds Act, 1869	Section six from "held not less" to "the said Act", and from "and a warrant of commitment" to end of section.
34 & 35 Vict.. c. 31	Trade Union Act 1871	The Trade Union Act, 1871	Section twenty from "for the county" to end of section.
34 & 35 Vict.. c. 105	Petroleum Act 1871	The Petroleum Act, 1871	Section fifteen from "the description of any offence" to "informant or prosecutor" (being sub-sections 4 and 5), and from "moreover" in sub-section (6) to "direct" in sub-section (7).
34 & 35 Vict.. c. 112	Prevention of Crimes Act 1871	The Prevention of Crime Act, 1871	Section seventeen from "the description of any offence" to "prosecutor or complainant" (being sub-sections, 2 and 3).
35 & 36 Vict.. c. 38	Infant Life Protection Act 1872	The Infant Life Protection Act, 1872	Section eleven from "the description" to "prosecutor."
35 & 36 Vict.. c. 50	Railway Rolling Stock Protection Act 1872	The Railway Rolling Stock Protection Act, 1872	Section six from "for the county" to end of section.
35 & 36 Vict.. c. 76	Coal Mines Regulation Act 1872	The Coal Mines Regulation Act, 1872	Section sixty-one from "for the county" to "party as the court thinks just", and Section sixty-three from "the description of any offence" to "of the informant" (being sub-sections 2 and 3).
35 & 36 Vict.. c. 77	Metalliferous Mines Regulation Act 1872	The Metalliferous Mines Regulation Act, 1872	Section thirty-two from "for the county" to "party as the court thinks just", and Section thirty-four from "the description of any offence" to "part of the informant" (being sub-sections 2 and 3).
35 & 36 Vict.. c. 93	Pawnbrokers Act 1872	The Pawnbrokers Act, 1872	Section fifty-two from "for the county" to end of section, except so far as relates to an appeal against the refusal of a certificate for a licence, and Section fifty-four.
35 & 36 Vict.. c. 94	Licensing Act 1872	The Licensing Act, 1872	Section fifty-one from "where the court" to "complainant and", (being sub-sections (2) and (3) and part of sub-section (4),) and Section fifty-two from "for the county" to end of section, and Section fifty-four from "moreover" to end of section.
36 & 37 Vict.. c. 77	Naval Artillery Volunteer Act 1873	The Naval Artillery Volunteer Act, 1873	Section thirty-six from "the description of any offence" to "informant or complainant" (being sub-sections 1 and 2). Section thirty-eight from "the conditions" to "this Act", and from "for the county" to end of section, and Section forty from "moreover" to end of section.
36 & 37 Vict.. c. 86	Elementary Education Act 1873	The Elementary Education Act, 1873	Section twenty-four from "the description of the offence" to "part of the informant" (being sub-sections 1 and 2).
37 & 38 Vict.. c. 67	Slaughter-houses, &c. (Metropolis) Act 1874	The Slaughter-houses, &c. (Metropolis) Act, 1874	Section six from "subject to" to "be made", and from "for the county" to end of section.
38 & 39 Vict.. c. 17	Explosives Act 1875	The Explosives Act, 1875	Section ninety-three from "in manner provided" to end of section.
38 & 39 Vict.. c. 55	Public Health Act 1875	The Public Health Act, 1875	Section two hundred and fifty-two, and Section two hundred and sixty-nine from "for the county" in sub-section one to "release him from custody" at the end of sub-section four, and from "In the case" in sub-section six to the end of the section, so far as relates to an appeal against an order or conviction of a court of summary jurisdiction.
38 & 39 Vict.. c. 60	Friendly Societies Act 1875	The Friendly Societies Act, 1875	Section thirty-three from "In any information" to "negatived" (being sub-section 5), and from "for the county" in sub-section (6) to end of such sub-section.
38 & 39 Vict.. c. 63	Sale of Food and Drugs Act 1875	The Sale of Food and Drugs Act, 1875	Section twenty-three from "which shall be held" to "think proper."
38 & 39 Vict.. c. 86	Conspiracy and Protection of Property Act 1875	The Conspiracy and Protection of Property Act, 1875	Section twelve from "for the county" to end of section.
39 & 40 Vict.. c. 45	Industrial and Provident Societies Act 1876	The Industrial and Provident Societies Act, 1876	Section nineteen from "in any information" to "negatived", being sub-section (5), and from "for the county" in sub-section (6) to end of such sub-section.
39 & 40 Vict.. c. 77	Cruelty to Animals Act 1876	The Cruelty to Animals Act, 1876	Section sixteen from "subject to the conditions" to "shall be made", and from "for the county" to end of section.
41 & 42 Vict.. c. 16	Factory and Workshop Act 1878	The Factory and Workshop Act, 1878	Section ninety from "having jurisdiction" to end of section, and Section ninety-one from "the description of an offence" to "part of the informant" (being sub-sections 2 and 3); and from "a conviction" at the beginning of sub-section (6) to "form and".
41 & 42 Vict.. c. 49	Weights and Measures Act 1878	The Weights and Measures Act, 1878	Section fifty-seven from "the description of an offence" to "sustain the same" (being sub-sections 1, 2, and 3), and Section sixty from "having jurisdiction" to end of section.
41 & 42 Vict.. c. 74	Contagious Diseases (Animals) Act 1878	The Contagious Diseases (Animals) Act, 1878	Section sixty-four from "for the county" to end of section, and Section sixty-six from "a warrant of commitment" to "convicted" (being sub-section 3).
41 & 42 Vict.. c. 77	Highways and Locomotives (Amendment) Act 1878	The Highways and Locomotives (Amendment) Act, 1878	Section thirty-seven from "subject to the conditions" to "shall be made", and from "for the county" to end of section.
42 & 43 Vict.. c. 49	Summary Jurisdiction Act 1879	The Summary Jurisdiction Act, 1879	In section thirty-one, the words "by this Act or by any future Act". Section thirty-two, down to "in accordance with the conditions and regulations contained in this Act".
45 & 46 Vict.. c. 50	Municipal Corporations Act 1882	The Municipal Corporations Act, 1882	Sub-sections five and six of section two hundred and twenty-seven.

== See also ==
- Summary Jurisdiction Act
- Statute Law Revision Act
