= Summary Jurisdiction Act 1848 =

Act of the Parliament of the United Kingdom

Summary Jurisdiction Act 1848 (Note: The citation of this act by this short title was authorised by section 1 of, and the first schedule to, the Short Titles Act 1896. Due to the repeal of those provisions it is now authorised by section 19(2) of the Interpretation Act 1978.)
- Act of Parliament
- Parliament of the United Kingdom
- Long title: An Act to facilitate the Performance of the Duties of Justices of the Peace out of Sessions, within England and Wales, with respect to summary Convictions and Orders.
- Citation: 11 & 12 Vict. c. 43
- Introduced by: John Jervis MP (Commons)
- Territorial extent: England and Wales (Note: Section 37.)

Dates
- Royal assent: 14 August 1848
- Commencement: 2 October 1848 (Note: Section 38)
- Repealed: England and Wales: 1 January 1972; Northern Ireland:
Other legislation
Amends	See § Repealed enactments
Repeals/revokes	See § Repealed enactments
Amended by	Statute Law Revision Act 1875; Summary Jurisdiction Act 1884; Statute Law Revision Act 1891; Statute Law Revision Act 1892; Statute Law Revision Act 1894; National Assistance Act 1948; Criminal Justice Act 1948; Justices of the Peace Act 1949; Costs in Criminal Cases Act 1952; Magistrates' Courts Act 1952; Courts Act 1971
Repealed by	England and Wales: Courts Act 1971; Northern Ireland: Criminal Justice (Northern Ireland) Order 1980
Relates to	Summary Jurisdiction Act 1879; Summary Jurisdiction (Process) Act 1881; Summary Jurisdiction Act 1884

Status: Repealed

History of passage through Parliament

Records of Parliamentary debate relating to the statute from Hansard

Text of statute as originally enacted

The Summary Jurisdiction Act 1848 (11 & 12 Vict. c. 43), also known as the Duties of Justices (Summary Convictions) Act 1848 was an act of the Parliament of the United Kingdom that consolidated the provisions of a large number of statutes relating to summary jurisdiction. The act is one of the Jervis's Acts, also known as Summary Jurisdiction Acts, which reformed the local administration of justice in England.

== Background ==
In the United Kingdom, acts of Parliament remain in force until expressly repealed. Blackstone's Commentaries on the Laws of England, published in the late 18th-century, raised questions about the system and structure of the common law and the poor drafting and disorder of the existing statute book.

In 1806, the Commission on Public Records passed a resolution requesting the production of a report on the best mode of reducing the volume of the statute book. From 1810 to 1825, The Statutes of the Realm was published, providing for the first time the authoritative collection of acts. In 1816, both Houses of Parliament, passed resolutions that an eminent lawyer with 20 clerks be commissioned to make a digest of the statutes, which was declared "very expedient to be done." However, this was never done.

On 16 March 1824, the Select Committee on the Criminal Law in England was appointed to consider the expediency of consolidating and amending the criminal law. The select committee reported on 2 April 1824, resolving to consolidate the criminal law under several heads and to bring in Bills to do so.

In 1827, Peel's Acts were passed to modernise, consolidate and repeal provisions of the criminal law, territorially limited to England and Wales and Scotland, including:

- Criminal Statutes Repeal Act 1827 (7 & 8 Geo. 4. c. 27), which repealed for England and Wales over 140 enactments relating to the criminal law.
- Criminal Law Act 1827 (7 & 8 Geo. 4. c. 28), which modernised the administration of criminal justice.
- Larceny Act 1827 (7 & 8 Geo. 4. c. 29), which consolidated provisions in the law relating to larceny.
- Malicious Injuries to Property Act 1827 (7 & 8 Geo. 4. c. 30), which consolidated provisions in the law relating to malicious injuries to property.

In 1828, parallel bills for Ireland to Peel's Acts were introduced, becoming:

- Criminal Statutes (Ireland) Repeal Act 1828 (9 Geo. 4. 54), which repealed for Ireland over 140 enactments relating to the criminal law.
- Criminal Law (Ireland) Act 1828 (9 Geo. 4. 54), which modernised the administration of criminal justice.
- Larceny (Ireland) Act 1828 (9 Geo. 4. c. 55) which consolidated provisions in the law relating to larceny.
- Malicious Injuries to Property (Ireland) Act 1828 (9 Geo. 4. c. 56), which consolidated provisions in the law relating to malicious injuries to property.

In 1828, the Offences Against the Person Act 1828 (9 Geo. 4. c. 31) was passed, which consolidated provisions in the law relating to offences against the person and repealed for England and Wales almost 60 related enactments. In 1829, the Offences Against the Person (Ireland) Act 1829 (10 Geo. 4. c. 34) was passed, which consolidated provisions in the law relating to offences against the person and repealed for Ireland almost 60 enactments relating to the Criminal law.

By 1848, the institution of justice of the peace in England and Wales had fallen into disrepute in some legal circles and was dealing with a rapidly increasing case load, its statutory basis dating back to the 16th century. Officials performed multiple functions, including statute administration, bail decisions, jury trial oversight, and summary jurisdiction matters. While traditionally operating in benches with other lay justices, a new trend emerged where full-time magistrates presided alone in urban jurisdictions. The system faced growing criticism, particularly regarding lay magistrates conducting jury trials, as even the quarter sessions chairmen who provided legal direction often lacked substantial legal expertise. This period also saw increasing complexity in regulatory law due to an active, reform-oriented Parliament.

In 1848, John Jervis MP was responsible for sponsoring, drafting and all but single-handedly guiding through the House of Commons three bills to reform the criminal and civil roles of a justice of the peace in England and Wales.

== Passage ==
Leave to bring in the Administration of Justice (No. 2.) Bill was granted to the Attorney General, John Jervis MP and the Solicitor General, Sir David Dundas, 2nd Baronet, on 3 February 1848. The bill had its first reading in the House of Commons on 3 February 1848, presented by the Attorney General, John Jervis MP. The bill had its second reading in the House of Commons on 12 February 1848 and was committed to a Committee of the Whole House. The order was discharged on 18 February 1848 and the bill was referred to a select committee, which reported on 1 June 1848, with amendments. The amended bill was re-committed to a committee of the whole house, which met on 8 June 1848 and reported on 10 June 1848, with amendments. The amended bill had its third reading in the House of Commons on 16 June 1848 and passed, with amendments.

The bill had its first reading in the House of Lords on 16 June 1848. The bill had its second reading in the House of Lords and was committed to a committee of the whole house, which met on 18 July 1848 and reported on 21 July 1848, with amendments. The amended bill had its third reading in the House of Lords on 24 July 1848 and passed, without amendments.

The amended bill was considered and agreed to by the House of Commons on 27 July 1848.

The bill was granted royal assent on 14 August 1848.

== Subsequent developments ==
In 1848, Jervis's Acts were passed, becoming:

- Indictable Offences Act 1848 (11 & 12 Vict. c. 42)
- Summary Jurisdiction Act 1848 (11 & 12 Vict. c. 43)
- Justices Protection Act 1848 (11 & 12 Vict. c. 44)

The acts were immediately praised for their work reforming the administration of criminal justice in England and were compared favourably in impact to Peel's Acts and Lord Lansdowne's Acts.

The act was supplemented by other Summary Jurisdiction Acts, which regulate the procedure before Justices of the Peace with respect to summary convictions and orders, including the Summary Jurisdiction Act 1879 (42 & 43 Vict. c. 49), the Summary Jurisdiction (Process) Act 1881 (44 & 45 Vict. c. 24) and the Summary Jurisdiction Act 1884 (47 & 48 Vict. c. 43).

Sections 36, 38 and 39 of the act were repealed by section 1 of, and the schedule to, the Statute Law Revision Act 1875 (38 & 39 Vict. c. 66), which came into force on 11 August 1875.

The whole act was repealed for England and Wales by section 56(4) of, and part IV of schedule 11 to, the Courts Act 1971, which came into force on 1 January 1972.

== Provisions ==
=== Repealed enactments ===
Section 36 of the act repealed 8 enactments, listed in that section, effective from 2 October 1848.

Section 36 of the act also repealed "all other Act or Acts or Parts of Acts which are inconsistent with the Provisions of this Act save and except so much of the said several Acts as repeal any other Acts or Parts of Acts". and also except as to Proceedings now pending to which the same or any of them are applicable

Citation	Short title	Title	Extent of repeal
18 Eliz. 1. c. 5	Common Informers Act 1575	A certain Act of Parliament made and passed in the Eighteenth Year of the Reign of Her Majesty Queen Elizabeth, intituled An Act to redress Disorders in Common Informers.	As relates to exhibiting an Information and pursuing the same in Person, and not by any Attorney or Deputy. I.e., section 1.
31 Eliz. 1. c. 5	Common Informers Act 1588	A certain other Act made and passed in the Thirty-first Year of the Reign of Her said Majesty Queen Elizabeth, intituled An Act concerning Informers.	As relates to the Time limited for exhibiting an Information for a Forfeiture upon any Penal Statute. I.e., section 5
27 Geo. 2. c. 20	Distresses Under Justices' Warrants Act 1754	A certain other Act made and passed in the Twenty-seventh Year of the Reign of His Majesty King George the Second, intituled An Act for the more easy and effectual proceeding upon Distresses to be made by Warrants of Justices of the Peace.	As relates to such Distresses. I.e., sections 1 and 2. (Note: This act is listed in the Chronological Table of the Statutes as being wholly repealed.)
18 Geo. 3. c. 19	Payment of Charges of Constables Act 1778	An Act made and passed in the Eighteenth Year of His late Majesty King George the Third, intituled An Act for the Payment of Costs to Parties on Complaints determined before Justices of the Peace out of Sessions, for the Payment of the Charges of Constables in certain Cases, and for the more effectual Payment of Charges to Witnesses and Prosecutors of any Larceny or other Felony.	As relates to such Costs on the said Complaints. I.e., sections 1, 2, 3 and 5.
33 Geo. 3. c. 55	Parish Officers Act 1793	A certain other Act made and passed in the Thirty-third Year of the Reign of His said late Majesty King George the Third, intituled An Act to authorize Justices of the Peace to impose Fines upon Constables, Overseers, and other Peace or Parish Officers for Neglect of Duty, and on Masters of Apprentices for ill Usage of such their Apprentices, and also to make Provision for the Execution of Warrants of Distress granted by Magistrates.	As relates to the Executions of such Warrants of Distress. I.e., section 3.
3 Geo. 4 c. 23	Summary Proceedings Act 1822	A certain other Act made and passed in the Third Year of the Reign of His late Majesty King George the Fourth, intituled An Act to facilitate summary Proceedings before Justices of the Peace and others.	The whole act.
5 Geo. 4. c. 18	Summary Convictions, etc. Act 1824	A certain other Act made and passed in the Fifth Year of the Reign of His late Majesty King George the Fourth, intituled An Act for the more effectual Recovery of Penalties before Justices and Magistrates on Conviction of Offenders, and for facilitating the Execution of Warrants by Constables.	The whole act.
6 & 7 Will. 4. c. 114	Trials for Felony Act 1836	A certain Act made and passed in the Seventh Year of the Reign of His late Majesty King William the Fourth, intituled An Act for enabling Persons indicted for Felony to make their Defence by Counsel or Attorney.	As relates to the Right of Persons accused, in Cases of summary Convictions, to make their Defence, and to have all Witnesses examined and cross-examined by Counsel or Attorney. I.e., section 2.

== See also ==
- Summary Jurisdiction Act
