= Statute Law Revision Act 1959 =

Act of the Parliament of the United Kingdom

Statute Law Revision Act 1959 (Note: Section 4.)
- Act of Parliament
- Parliament of the United Kingdom
- Long title: An Act to revise the statute law by repealing obsolete, spent, unnecessary or superseded enactments.
- Citation: 7 & 8 Eliz. 2. c. 68
- Territorial extent: United Kingdom

Dates
- Royal assent: 29 July 1959
- Commencement: 29 July 1959 (Note: The Acts of Parliament (Commencement) Act 1793.)
- Repealed: 27 June 1974
Other legislation
Amends	See § Repealed enactments
Repeals/revokes	See § Repealed enactments
Amended by	Northern Ireland Constitution Act 1973
Repealed by	Statute Law (Repeals) Act 1974
Relates to	Repeal of Obsolete Statutes Act 1856; See Statute Law Revision Act

Status: Repealed

Text of statute as originally enacted

The Statute Law Revision Act 1959 (7 & 8 Eliz. 2. c. 68) was an act of the Parliament of the United Kingdom.

The effect of this act is set out in the Report of the Joint Committee on Consolidation Bills dated 24 June 1959.

== Provisions ==
=== Repealed enactments ===
Sections 1 and 2 of the act repealed 105 enactments, listed in the first and second schedules to the act, respectively.

==== First schedule: Obsolete, &c., acts repealed ====
First schedule — Obsolete, &c., acts repealed
Citation	Short title	Extent of repeal
7 Geo. 2. c. 19	Adulteration of Hops Act 1733	The whole act.
17 Geo. 2. c. 30	Linen (Trade Marks) Act 1743	The whole act.
18 Geo. 2. c. 24	Linen (Trade Marks) Act 1744	The whole act.
13 Geo. 3. c. 32	Stealing of Vegetables Act 1772	The whole act.
6 Geo. 4. c. 59	British North America (Seignorial Rights) Act 1825	The whole act.
7 Geo. 4. c. 67	Bankers (Scotland) Act 1826	The whole act.
5 & 6 Vict. c. 120	Newfoundland Act 1842	The whole act.
7 & 8 Vict. c. 68	Ecclesiastical Courts Act 1844	The whole act.
8 & 9 Vict. c. 77	Hosiery Act 1845	The whole act.
8 & 9 Vict. c. 128	Silk Weavers Act 1845	The whole act.
14 & 15 Vict. c. 63	New Brunswick Boundary Act 1851	The whole act.
27 & 28 Vict. c. 64	Public House Closing Act 1864	The whole act.
37 & 38 Vict. c. 49	Licensing Act 1874	The whole act.
38 & 39 Vict. c. 71	Ecclesiastical Commissioners Act 1875	The whole act.
38 & 39 Vict. c. 76	Ecclesiastical Fees Act 1875	The whole act.
10 & 11 Geo. 5. c. 20	Veterinary Surgeons Act (1881) Amendment Act 1920	The whole act.
12 & 13 Geo. 5. c. 21	Treaties of Washington Act 1922	The whole act.
12 & 13 Geo. 5. c. 53	War Service Canteens (Disposal of Surplus) Act 1922	The whole act.
21 & 22 Geo. 5. c. 2	Cunard (Insurance) Agreement Act 1930	The whole act.
9 & 10 Geo. 6. c. 56	British Museum Act 1946	The whole act.

==== Second schedule: Repeals of obsolete, &c., provisions in miscellaneous branches of law ====
Second schedule — Repeals of obsolete, &c., provisions in miscellaneous branches of law
Citation	Short title	Extent of repeal
Army (Prize and Savings Bank) Provisions
2 & 3 Will. 4. c. 53	Army Prize Money Act 1832	The whole act.
11 & 12 Vict. c. 55	Paymaster General Act 1848	Sections seven, eight and nine.
22 & 23 Vict. c. 20	Military Savings Bank Act 1859	The whole act.
26 & 27 Vict. c. 12	Secretary at War Abolition Act 1863	In the Schedule, the words " the Military Savings Bank Act, 1859 ".
27 & 28 Vict. c. 36	Army Prize (Shares of Deceased) Act 1864	The whole act.
29 & 30 Vict. c. 47	Indian Prize Money Act 1866	The whole act.
31 & 32 Vict. c. 38	Indian Prize Money Act 1868	The whole act.
25 & 26 Geo. 5. c. 11	Regimental Charitable Funds Act 1935	In section one, in subsection (1), the words from " and upon " onwards.
1 & 2 Geo. 6. c. 63	Administration of Justice (Miscellaneous Provisions) Act 1938	In the First Schedule, paragraph 2.
Colonial and other Loans Provisions
7 Edw. 7. c. 37	Transvaal Loan (Guarantee) Act 1907	The whole act.
21 & 22 Geo. 5. c. 26	Mauritius Loan (Guarantee) Act 1931	The whole act.
22 & 23 Geo. 5. c. 17	Tanganyika and British Honduras Loans Act 1932	Sections three, four and five and the Schedule.
23 & 24 Geo. 5. c. 5	Austrian Loan Guarantee Act 1933	The whole act.
Legal Procedure Provisions
18 Eliz. 1. c. 5	Common Informers Act 1575	The whole act.
31 Eliz. 1. c. 5	Common Informers Act 1588	The whole act.
21 Jas. 1. c. 4	Common Informers Act 1623	The whole act.
10 & 11 Chas. 1. c. 11 (I)	Common Informers Act 1634	The whole act.
11 Geo. 4 & 1 Will. 4. c. 36	Contempt of Court Act 1830	Section two. In section fifteen, rules 15, 19 and 20. Section seventeen.
Local Government Provisions
4 & 5 Will. 4. c. 76	Poor Law Amendment Act 1834	The preamble. Sections eighty-five and eighty-six. Section one hundred and nine, with the exception of the definition of " poor rate ".
7 & 8 Vict. c. 101	Poor Law Amendment Act 1844	Section twenty-two. Section sixty, except so far as it relates to perambulations. Sections sixty-two and seventy-four.
11 & 12 Vict. c. 91	Poor Law Audit Act 1848	Sections one and two.
62 & 63 Vict. c. 14	London Government Act 1899	In section eleven, in subsection (1), the words from " the town clerk " (where first occurring) to " the borough, and ", in subsection (2), the words from " and the Local Government Board " onwards, and, in subsection (3), the words " shall be in a form approved by the Local Government Board and ", and the words " in manner provided in that form ".
11 & 12 Geo. 6. c. 26	Local Government Act 1948	In section one hundred and twenty, in subsection (2), paragraphs (a) and (c). In section one hundred and twenty-one, in subsection (4), paragraphs (b) and (c).
National Debt Provisions
51 & 52 Vict. c. 2	National Debt (Conversion) Act 1888	In section two, in subsection (5), the words " and paid out of the permanent annual charge of the National Debt ". In section twelve, in subsection (2), the words " or the growing produce thereof ". In section thirteen, in subsection (1), the words from " or the growing produce thereof " onwards.
8 Edw. 7. c. 16	Finance Act 1908	Section nine.
1 & 2 Geo. 5. c. 48	Finance Act 1911	Section sixteen.
10 & 11 Geo. 5. c. 18	Finance Act 1920	Section fifty-eight.
12 & 13 Geo. 5. c. 17	Finance Act 1922	Part IV.
13 & 14 Geo. 5. c. 14	Finance Act 1923	Section thirty-four.
16 & 17 Geo. 5. c. 22	Finance Act 1926	Section forty-one.
18 & 19 Geo. 5. c. 17	Finance Act 1928	Sections twenty-four and twenty-five.
21 & 22 Geo. 5. c. 49	Finance (No. 2) Act 1931	Section twenty-one.
22 & 23 Geo. 5. c. 25	Finance Act 1932	Sections twenty-one and twenty-two.
23 & 24 Geo. 5. c. 19	Finance Act 1933	Section thirty-five.
24 & 25 Geo. 5. c. 32	Finance Act 1934	Section twenty-three.
25 & 26 Geo. 5. c. 24	Finance Act 1935	Section twenty-seven.
26 Geo. 5 & 1 Edw. 8. c. 34	Finance Act 1936	Section thirty.
1 Edw. 8 & 1 Geo. 6. c. 54	Finance Act 1937	Section twenty-six.
1 & 2 Geo. 6. c. 46	Finance Act 1938	Section fifty-three.
2 & 3 Geo. 6. c. 41	Finance Act 1939	Section thirty-four.
3 & 4 Geo. 6. c. 29	Finance Act 1940	Section sixty-one.
10 & 11 Geo. 6. c. 35	Finance Act 1947	Sections sixty-eight, seventy and seventy-one.
11 & 12 Geo. 6. c. 49	Finance Act 1948	Section eighty.
12, 13 & 14 Geo. 6. c. 47	Finance Act 1949	Section forty-six and, in section forty-seven, subsection (1).
14 Geo. 6. c. 15	Finance Act 1950	Section forty-nine.
14 & 15 Geo. 6. c. 43	Finance Act 1951	Section forty-three.
15 & 16 Geo. 6 & 1 Eliz. 2. c. 33	Finance Act 1952	Section seventy-five.
1 & 2 Eliz. 2. c. 34	Finance Act 1953	Section thirty-four.
Purchase Tax Provisions
3 & 4 Geo. 6. c. 48	Finance (No. 2) Act 1940	In section twenty-three, in subsection (3), paragraph (a) and, in paragraph (b), the words " after the passing of that Act ". In section twenty-seven, in subsection (1), the words from " after the date " to " of this Act ". Section thirty-seven.
5 & 6 Geo. 6. c. 21	Finance Act 1942	In section seventeen, subsection (2). In section eighteen, subsection (4).
6 & 7 Geo. 6. c. 28	Finance Act 1943	In section eleven, subsection (2).
7 & 8 Geo. 6. c. 23	Finance Act 1944	In section eleven, in subsection (1), paragraph (a). Part II of the Second Schedule.
9 & 10 Geo. 6. c. 64	Finance Act 1946	Section nineteen. In section twenty-two, subsection (3).
11 & 12 Geo. 6. c. 49	Finance Act 1948	In section twenty-two, in subsection (1), the words from " but " to the end, and in subsection (2), paragraph (a).
1 & 2 Eliz. 2. c. 34	Finance Act 1953	In section eleven, subsection (5).
4 & 5 Eliz. 2. c. 17	Finance (No. 2) Act 1955	Section one. In section five, subsection (2).
6 & 7 Eliz. 2. c. 56	Finance Act 1958	In section one, subsection (1). The First Schedule.
Road and Rail Transport Provisions
1 & 2 Will. 4. c. 22	London Hackney Carriage Act 1831	Section forty-eight.
2 & 3 Will. 4. c. 120	Stage Carriages Act 1832	The whole act except section forty-eight and, in section one hundred and three, the words from " it shall be lawful " (where first occurring) to " this Act ".
3 & 4 Will. 4. c. 48	London Hackney Carriages Act 1833	The whole act.
3 & 4 Vict. c. 97	Railway Regulation Act 1840	Section three.
7 & 8 Vict. c. 85	Railway Regulation Act 1844	Section one. In section two, the words from " provided also " onwards. In section three, the words " revision or ". In section four, the words " revision or ", in the first two places where they occur, the words " whether of revision or purchase ", " the guarantee or " and " as the case may be ", and the words " or either of them " in both places where they occur. In section five, the words " revision or ".
8 & 9 Vict. c. 20	Railways Clauses Consolidation Act 1845	In section eighty-six, the words from " and to make such reasonable charges " onwards. Sections ninety-one to ninety-three. In section ninety-five, the words from the beginning to " maintained and " and the words " board or ". In section ninety-six, the words " by notice to be annexed to the list of tolls ".
8 & 9 Vict. c. 33	Railways Clauses Consolidation (Scotland) Act 1845	In section seventy-nine, the words from " and to make such reasonable charges " onwards. Sections eighty-four to eighty-six. In section eighty-eight, the words from the beginning to " maintained and " and the words " board or ". In section eighty-nine, the words " by notice to be annexed to the list of tolls ".
9 & 10 Vict. c. 57	Railway Regulation (Gauge) Act 1846	The whole act.
27 & 28 Vict. c. 121	Railways Construction Facilities Act 1864	Sections forty-nine and fifty. In section fifty-three, the words from " or from any revision " onwards. Part (iii) of the Schedule.
31 & 32 Vict. c. 119	Regulation of Railways Act 1868	Sections seventeen, eighteen, twenty and twenty-one.
46 & 47 Vict. c. 34	Cheap Trains Act 1883	Sections three and five. In section eight, the definitions of " fare " and " minimum fare " and the words from " Provided that " onwards.
51 & 52 Vict. c. 25	Railway and Canal Traffic Act 1888	Sections thirteen, twenty-four and twenty-nine. In section thirty-five, in subsection (1), paragraph (a). Section thirty-eight. Except so far as they relate to charges of an independent inland waterway undertaking which are not charges with respect to which a Provisional Order was made and confirmed by Parliament in pursuance of sections twenty-four and thirty-six of the Act, section twenty-five from " Provided that " onwards, sections twenty-six, thirty-one and thirty-six, and subsections (2), (3) and (5) of section thirty-seven.
54 & 55 Vict. c. 12	Railway and Canal Traffic (Provisional Orders) Amendment Act 1891	The whole act.
55 & 56 Vict. c. 44	Railway and Canal Traffic Act 1892	The whole act.
59 & 60 Vict. c. 48	Light Railways Act 1896	So much of the Second Schedule as relates to the Cheap Trains Act, 1883.
9 & 10 Geo. 5. c. 50	Ministry of Transport Act 1919	Section three, with the exception of paragraph (d) of subsection (1) so far as applied by subsequent enactments. Section thirteen. In section fourteen, in subsection (1), the words " or for the purchase of privately owned railway wagons ", the words from " (a) in the case " to " other securities " and the words " or the growing produce thereof ", and subsection (2).
11 & 12 Geo. 5. c. 32	Finance Act 1921	Section six.
11 & 12 Geo. 5. c. 55	Railways Act 1921	Section eleven. Sections twenty-eight to thirty-eight. Sections forty to fifty-five. Section fifty-seven. Section sixty-one. Section seventy-two. The Fourth and Fifth Schedules.
14 & 15 Geo. 5. c. 34	London Traffic Act 1924	Section thirteen. In section sixteen, the definitions of " omnibus ", " trolley vehicle ", " tramway car ", " licensing authority " and " proprietor ".
20 & 21 Geo. 5. c. 43	Road Traffic Act 1930	Section sixty-six. In section sixty-eight, subsection (6). Section ninety-six.
23 & 24 Geo. 5. c. 14	London Passenger Transport Act 1933	In section fifty-one, subsection (8). Section fifty-five. In section sixty-one, subsections (10) and (11). In section sixty-two, subsection (7). Sections sixty-five and sixty-six. In the Thirteenth Schedule, the entry relating to section sixteen of the London Traffic Act, 1924.
23 & 24 Geo. 5. c. 53	Road and Rail Traffic Act 1933	In section seven, subsections (2), (3) and (4). In section eight, in subsection (3), the words " Subject to the provisions of subsection (3) of the last preceding section ". In section ten, in subsection (2), the words " (except the provisions of subsections (2), (3) and (4) of section seven) ". In section twenty-nine, in subsection (6), the words from " and subsection (5) " onwards, and subsection (7). In section thirty-six, in subsection (1), the definition of " Authorised vehicle ". Sections forty and forty-four.
24 & 25 Geo. 5. c. 50	Road Traffic Act 1934	Sections thirty and thirty-two. In section thirty-nine, the words from " as respects " to " this section " and the proviso. In section forty-one, in paragraph (8), subsection (3) of the section directed by that paragraph to be substituted for section twenty-three.
25 & 26 Geo. 5. c. 27	London Passenger Transport (Agreement) Act 1935	The whole act.
26 Geo. 5 & 1 Edw. 8. c. 6	Railways (Agreement) Act 1935	The whole act.
1 Edw. 8 & 1 Geo. 6. c. 28	Harbours, Piers and Ferries (Scotland) Act 1937	Section twenty-four.
10 & 11 Geo. 6. c. 49	Transport Act 1947	Section eighty-two. In section eighty-three, subsections (1) to (4). Section eighty-four.
1 & 2 Eliz. 2. c. 13	Transport Act 1953	In section twenty-one, subsection (3), and in subsection (4), the words " or standard ", and the words from " Notwithstanding anything " onwards. In the Fourth Schedule, in Part I, in paragraph 1, in sub-paragraph (2), the words " notwithstanding anything in subsection (1) of the said section eighty-three ".

== Subsequent developments ==
Section 3 of the act was repealed by section 41(1) of, and part I of schedule 6 to, the Northern Ireland Constitution Act 1973, which came into force on 18 July 1973.

The whole act was repealed by section 1 of, and part XI of the schedule to, the Statute Law (Repeals) Act 1974, which came into force on 27 June 1974.

The enactments which were repealed (whether for the whole or any part of the United Kingdom) by the act were repealed so far as they extended to the Isle of Man by section 1(1) of, and schedule 1 to, the Statute Law Revision (Isle of Man) Act 1991, which came into force on 25 July 1991.

== See also ==
- Statute Law Revision Act

== Bibliography ==
- Halsbury's Statutes
- HC Deb vol 609, cols 1719 to 1720.
