= Railway Regulation Act 1840 =

Act of the Parliament of the United Kingdom

Railway Regulation Act 1840 (Note: The citation of this act by this short title was authorised by section 1 of, and the first schedule to, the Short Titles Act 1896. Due to the repeal of those provisions it is now authorised by section 19(2) of the Interpretation Act 1978.)
- Act of Parliament
- Parliament of the United Kingdom
- Long title: An Act for regulating Railways.
- Citation: 3 & 4 Vict. c. 97
- Territorial extent: United Kingdom

Dates
- Royal assent: 10 August 1840
- Commencement: 10 October 1840 (Note: Section 1.)
Other legislation
Amended by	Criminal Statutes Repeal Act 1861; Summary Jurisdiction Act 1884; Perjury Act 1911; False Oaths (Scotland) Act 1933; Magistrates' Courts Act 1952; Statute Law Revision Act 1959; Statute Law (Repeals) Act 1976; Statute Law Revision (Northern Ireland) Act 1980

Status: Amended

Text of statute as originally enacted

Revised text of statute as amended

Text of the Railway Regulation Act 1840 as in force today (including any amendments) within the United Kingdom, from legislation.gov.uk.

The Railway Regulation Act 1840 (3 & 4 Vict. c. 97) is an act of the Parliament of the United Kingdom. It brought regulation to the fast-growing railway industry in the United Kingdom.

It is one of the Railway Regulation Acts 1840 to 1893.

The Railways Department of the Board of Trade (the predecessor of His Majesty's Railway Inspectorate) was created to fulfil this task.

== Provisions ==
Measures contained in the act were:

- No railway to be opened without notice to the Board of Trade
- Returns to be made by railway companies
- Appointment of Board of Trade railway inspectors
- Railway byelaws to be approved by the Board
- Prohibition of drunkenness by railway employees
- Prohibition of obstruction of the railway
- Prohibition of trespass on railways

As of 2026, section 16 of the act, For punishment of persons obstructing the officers of any railway company, or trespassing upon any railway remains in force, as subsequently amended. The remainder has been repealed and replaced.

== Subsequent developments ==
The following enactments were repealed by section 2 of, and the second schedule to, the Statute Law Revision Act 1959 (7 & 8 Eliz. 2. c. 68), which came into force on 29 July 1959.

- Section 1.
- In section 2, the words from " provided also " onwards. In section three, the words " revision or ".
- In section 4, the words " revision or ", in the first two places where they occur, the words " whether of revision or purchase ", " the guarantee or " and " as the case may be ", and the words " or either of them " in both places where they occur.
- In section 5, the words " revision or ".

Section 17 of the act was repealed by section 1(1) of, and part XIX of schedule 1 to, the Statute Law (Repeals) Act 1976, which came into force on 27 May 1976. Section 21 of the act was repealed by section 1(1) of, and part XX of schedule 1 to, the 1976 act.
