= Westminster Court of Burgesses =

Court of the City and Liberty of Westminster

Court of Burgesses
- City and Liberty of Westminster
- Coat of arms of Westminster from 1601

Type
- Type: Manorial court

History
- Established: 1585
- Disbanded: 1900
- Succeeded by: Westminster City Council

Leadership
- Chairman: High Steward of Westminster Abbey
- Seats: 12 burgesses 12 assistant burgesses

Elections
- Voting system: Annual nomination

Meeting place
- Westminster

Government of the City of Westminster Act 1584
- Act of Parliament
- Parliament of England
- Long title: An Act for the good government of the city or borough of Westminster in Middlesex.
- Citation: 27 Eliz. 1. c. 31 (Note: This is the citation in The Statutes of the Realm.); 27 Eliz. 1. c. 17 Pr. (Note: This is the citation in The Statutes at Large.)
- Territorial extent: England and Wales

Dates
- Royal assent: 14 September 1585
- Commencement: 23 November 1584 (Note: Start of session.)
- Repealed
Other legislation
Repealed by	Court of Burgesses Scheme 1901

Status: Repealed

Text of statute as originally enacted

The Westminster Court of Burgesses was established by the Government of the City of Westminster Act 1584 (27 Eliz. 1. c. 31) in 1585 and abolished in 1900. It formed part of the local government of the City and Liberty of Westminster, England.

The act was continued until the end of the next session of parliament by the Continuance, etc. of Laws Act 1586 (29 Eliz. 1. c. 5), the Continuance, etc. of Laws Act 1586 (29 Eliz. 1. c. 5), the Continuance, etc. of Laws Act 1588 (31 Eliz. 1. c. 10) and the Continuance, etc. of Laws Act 1592 (35 Eliz. 1. c. 7).

The court was set up following the dissolution of the monasteries, filling a power vacuum created by Westminster Abbey ceasing to exert control over the area.

Initially it had the powers to deal with nuisances and adjudicate the prosecutions of some minor criminal offences. The parishes that made up the city continued to have self governance through their vestries. After justices of the peace were set up for Westminster in 1618, the court dealt with lesser cases such as offences relating to weights and measures.

The Westminster area was incorporated as the Metropolitan Borough of Westminster in 1900 and the court, as well as the parish vestries, were replaced by Westminster City Council.
