= Common Informers Act 1588 =

Act of the Parliament of England

Common Informers Act 1588 (Note: The citation of this act by this short title was authorised by section 5 of, and the second schedule to, the Statute Law Revision Act 1948. Due to the repeal of those provisions, it is now authorised by section 19(2) of the Interpretation Act 1978.)
- Act of Parliament
- Parliament of England
- Long title: An Acte concerninge Informers (Note: These words are printed against this act in the second column of the second schedule to the Statute Law Revision Act 1948, which is headed "Title".)
- Citation: 31 Eliz. 1. c. 5
- Territorial extent: England and Wales

Dates
- Royal assent: 29 March 1589
- Commencement: 4 February 1589 (Note: Start of session.)
- Repealed: 29 July 1959

Other legislation
- Repeals/revokes: Penal Actions Act 1515
- Amended by: Summary Jurisdiction Act 1848; Civil Procedure Acts Repeal Act 1879; Statute Law Revision Act 1888; Limitation Act 1939
- Repealed by: Statute Law Revision Act 1959
- Relates to: Common Informers Act 1575; Common Informers Act 1951

Status: Repealed

Text of statute as originally enacted

The Common Informers Act 1588 (31 Eliz. 1. c. 5) was an act of the Parliament of England.

== Provisions ==
Section 6 of the act repealed the Penal Actions Act 1515 (7 Hen. 8. c. 3).

== Subsequent developments ==
Sections 4 and 6, and Sections 2 and 3, except as to criminal proceedings, were repealed by section 2 of, and part I of the schedule to, the Civil Procedure Acts Repeal Act 1879 (42 & 43 Vict. c. 59), which came into force on 15 August 1879.

Section 5 of the act was repealed by section 34(4) of, and the schedule to, the Limitation Act 1939 (2 & 3 Geo. 6. c. 21), which came into force on 1 July 1940.

The whole act was repealed by section 2 of, and the second schedule to, the Statute Law Revision Act 1959 (7 & 8 Eliz. 2. c. 68), which came into force on 29 July 1959.
