= Military Savings Banks Act 1859 =

Act of the Parliament of the United Kingdom

Military Savings Banks Act 1859 (Note: The citation of this act by this short title was authorised by section 1 of, and the first schedule to, the Short Titles Act 1896. Due to the repeal of those provisions it is now authorised by section 19(2) of the Interpretation Act 1978.)
- Act of Parliament
- Parliament of the United Kingdom
- Long title: An Act to amend and consolidate the Laws relating to Military Savings Banks.
- Citation: 22 & 23 Vict. c. 20
- Territorial extent: United Kingdom

Dates
- Royal assent: 13 August 1859
- Commencement: 13 August 1859 (Note: Section 16.)
- Repealed: 29 July 1959
Other legislation
Repeals/revokes	Military Savings Banks Act 1842; Military Savings Bank Act 1845; Regimental Benefit Societies Act 1849
Repealed by	Statute Law Revision Act 1959

Status: Repealed

Text of statute as originally enacted

The Military Savings Banks Act 1859 (22 & 23 Vict. c. 20) was an act of the Parliament of the United Kingdom that consolidated enactments related to military savings banks in the United Kingdom.

== Provisions ==
=== Repealed enactments ===
Section 1 of the act repealed the Military Savings Banks Act 1842 (5 & 6 Vict. c. 71), the Military Savings Bank Act 1845 (8 & 9 Vict. c. 27) and the Regimental Benefit Societies Act 1849.

== Subsequent developments ==
The whole act was repealed by section 2 of, and the second schedule to, the Statute Law Revision Act 1959 (7 & 8 Eliz. 2. c. 68), which came into force on 29 July 1959.
