= List of acts of the Parliament of England from 1584 =

This is a list of acts of the Parliament of England for the year 1584.

For acts passed during the period 1707–1800, see the list of acts of the Parliament of Great Britain. See also the list of acts of the Parliament of Scotland, and the list of acts of the Parliament of Ireland.

For acts passed from 1801 onwards, see the list of acts of the Parliament of the United Kingdom. For acts of the devolved parliaments and assemblies in the United Kingdom, see the list of acts of the Scottish Parliament, the list of acts of the Northern Ireland Assembly, and the list of acts and measures of Senedd Cymru; see also the list of acts of the Parliament of Northern Ireland.

For medieval statutes, etc. that are not considered to be acts of Parliament, see the list of English statutes.

See also the List of ordinances and acts of the Parliament of England, 1642–1660 for ordinances and acts passed by the Long Parliament and other bodies without royal assent, and which were not considered to be valid legislation following the Restoration in 1660.

The number shown after each act's title is its chapter number. Acts are cited using this number, preceded by the years of the reign during which the relevant parliamentary session was held; thus the Union with Ireland Act 1800 is cited as "39 & 40 Geo. 3. c. 67", meaning the 67th act passed during the session that started in the 39th year of the reign of George III and which finished in the 40th year of that reign. The modern convention is to use Arabic numerals in citations (thus "41 Geo. 3" rather than "41 Geo. III"). Acts of the last session of the Parliament of Great Britain and the first session of the Parliament of the United Kingdom are both cited as "41 Geo. 3".

Acts passed by the Parliament of England did not have a short title; however, some of these acts have subsequently been given a short title by acts of the Parliament of the United Kingdom, such as the Short Titles Act 1896 (59 & 60 Vict. c. 14).

Acts passed by the Parliament of England were deemed to have come into effect on the first day of the session in which they were passed. Because of this, the years given in the list below may in fact be the year before a particular act was passed.

== 27 Eliz. 1 ==
The 5th Parliament of Queen Elizabeth I, which met from 23 November 1584 until 29 March 1585. Parliament was then prorogued by commission and was dissolved on 14 September 1585 without sitting for further business.

This session was traditionally cited as 27 Eliz., 27 Elz. or 27 El.

=== Public acts ===
Short title	Citation	Royal assent
Long title
Safety of the Queen, etc. Act 1584 or the Act of Association 1584 (repealed)	27 Eliz. 1. c. 1	29 March 1585
An Act for Provision to be made for the Surety of the Queen's Majesty most Royal Person, and the Continuance of the Realm in Peace. (Repealed by Statute Law Revision Act 1863 (26 & 27 Vict. c. 125))
Jesuits, etc. Act 1584 (repealed)	27 Eliz. 1. c. 2	29 March 1585
An act against Jesuits, seminary priests, and such other like disobedient persons. (Repealed for England and Wales by Roman Catholics Act 1844 (7 & 8 Vict. c. 102) and for the Isle of Man by Statute Law Revision (Isle of Man) Act 1991 (c. 61))
Lands of Crown Accountants Act 1584 (repealed)	27 Eliz. 1. c. 3	29 March 1585
An Act for explanation of the statute made anno 13 of the Queen's majesty's reign, intituled, "An Act to make the lands, tenements, goods and chattels of tellers, receivers, &c. liable to the payment of their debts." (Note: Liability of Crown Accountants Act 1571 (13 Eliz. 1. c. 4)) (Repealed by Law of Property (Amendment) Act 1924 (15 & 16 Geo. 5. c. 5))
Fraudulent Conveyances Act 1584 (repealed)	27 Eliz. 1. c. 4	29 March 1585
An Act against covinous and fraudulent Conveyances. (Repealed by Law of Property Act 1925 (15 & 16 Geo. 5. c. 20))
Demurrers and Pleadings Act 1584 (repealed)	27 Eliz. 1. c. 5	29 March 1585
An Act for the expedition of justice in cases of demurrers and pleadings. (Repealed by Statute Law Revision and Civil Procedure Act 1883 (46 & 47 Vict. c. 49))
Juries Act 1584 (repealed)	27 Eliz. 1. c. 6	29 March 1585
An Act for the returning of sufficient jurors, and for the better expedition of trials. (Repealed by Juries Act 1825 (6 Geo. 4. c. 50))
Juries (No. 2) Act 1584 (repealed)	27 Eliz. 1. c. 7	29 March 1585
An Act for the levying of issues lost by jurors. (Repealed by Juries Act 1825 (6 Geo. 4. c. 50))
Error From Queen's Bench Act 1584 (repealed)	27 Eliz. 1. c. 8	29 March 1585
An Act for redress of erroneous judgments in the court, commonly called, the King's bench. (Repealed by Statute Law Revision Act 1863 (26 & 27 Vict. c. 125))
Fines and Recoveries Act 1584 (repealed)	27 Eliz. 1. c. 9	29 March 1585
An Act for reformation of errors in fines and recoveries, in the twelve shires of Wales, town and county of Heaverford-West, with the counties palatine. (Repealed by Statute Law Revision Act 1887 (50 & 51 Vict. c. 59))
Common Informers Act 1584 (repealed)	27 Eliz. 1. c. 10	29 March 1585
An Act for the continuance of a former statute, intituled, "An Act to redress disorders in common informers upon penal statutes," (Note: Common Informers Act 1575 (18 Eliz. 1. c. 5)) made in the eighteenth year of the Queen's majesty's reign. (Repealed by Statute Law Revision Act 1863 (26 & 27 Vict. c. 125))
Continuance, etc. of Laws Act 1584 (repealed)	27 Eliz. 1. c. 11	29 March 1585
An Act for the reviving, continuance, explanation, and perfecting of divers statutes. (Repealed by Statute Law Revision Act 1863 (26 & 27 Vict. c. 125))
Swearing of Under-Sheriffs Act 1584 (repealed)	27 Eliz. 1. c. 12	29 March 1585
An Act for the swearing of under-sheriffs, and other under officers and ministers. (Repealed by Sheriffs Act 1887 (50 & 51 Vict. c. 55))
Hue and Cry Act 1584 (repealed)	27 Eliz. 1. c. 13	29 March 1585
An Act for the following of hue and cry. (Repealed for England and Wales by Criminal Statutes Repeal Act 1827 (7 & 8 Geo. 4. c. 27) and for India by Criminal Law (India) Act 1828 (9 Geo. 4. c. 74))
Malt Act 1584 (repealed)	27 Eliz. 1. c. 14	29 March 1585
An Act for reviving of a former Statute (Note: Malt Act 1548 (2 & 3 Edw. 6. c. 10)) made for the true making of Malt. (Repealed by Statute Law Revision Act 1863 (26 & 27 Vict. c. 125))
Importation Act 1584 (repealed)	27 Eliz. 1. c. 15	29 March 1585
An Act for the bringing in of staple-fish and herrings into this realm. (Repealed by Repeal of Acts Concerning Importation Act 1822 (3 Geo. 4. c. 41))
Leather Act 1584 (repealed)	27 Eliz. 1. c. 16	29 March 1585
An Act touching artificers using the cutting of leather. (Repealed by Statute Law Revision Act 1863 (26 & 27 Vict. c. 125))
Cloths Act 1584 (repealed)	27 Eliz. 1. c. 17	29 March 1585
An Act touching the breadth of white-woolen cloths, made in the counties of Somerset, Wiltshire, Gloucester, and Oxon, &c. (Repealed by Woollen Manufacture Act 1809 (49 Geo. 3. c. 109))
Cloths (No. 2) Act 1584 (repealed)	27 Eliz. 1. c. 18	29 March 1585
An Act concerning making of woolen cloths in the counties of Devon and Cornwall, called Plain white straights, and Pinned white straights. (Repealed by Woollen Manufacture Act 1809 (49 Geo. 3. c. 109))
Preservation of Timber Act 1584 (repealed)	27 Eliz. 1. c. 19	29 March 1585
An Act for the preservation of timer in the wilds of the counties of Sussex, Surry and Kent, and for the amendment of highways decayed by carriage two and from iron mills there. (Repealed by Repeal of Obsolete Statutes Act 1856 (19 & 20 Vict. c. 64))
Plymouth Haven Act 1584	27 Eliz. 1. c. 20	29 March 1585
An Act for the preservation of the haven at Plymouth.
Fishing, Orford Haven, Suffolk Act 1584	27 Eliz. 1. c. 21	29 March 1585
An Act for the preservation of Orford haven.
Chichester Haven Act 1584 (repealed)	27 Eliz. 1. c. 22	29 March 1585
An Act for bringing of the haven of the city of Chichester, by a new cut channel, to the suburbs of the same city. (Repealed by Statute Law Revision Act 1948 (11 & 12 Geo. 6. c. 62))
Clothiers Act 1584 (repealed)	27 Eliz. 1. c. 23	29 March 1585
An Act for cloth-making in the towns of Boxstead and Langham in the county of Essex. (Repealed by Statute Law Revision Act 1863 (26 & 27 Vict. c. 125))
Norfolk Coast Sea Defences Act 1584 (repealed)	27 Eliz. 1. c. 24	29 March 1585
An Act for the keeping of the sea-banks and sea-works in the county of Norfolk. (Repealed by Statute Law Revision Act 1948 (11 & 12 Geo. 6. c. 62))
Rochester Bridge Act 1584 (repealed)	27 Eliz. 1. c. 25	29 March 1585
An Act for the explanation of the statute for the maintenance of Rochester bridge. (Repealed by Rochester Bridge Act 1908 (8 Edw. 7. c. lvii))
Isle of Sheppey (Roads) Act 1584 (repealed)	27 Eliz. 1. c. 26	29 March 1585
An Act for explaining of the statute for the amending of the highways between Middleton and the King's Ferry, leading into the isle of Sheppey, in the county of Kent. (Repealed by Highways (No. 2) Act 1766 (7 Geo. 3. c. 42))
Plumstead Marsh Land Reclamation Act 1584 (repealed)	27 Eliz. 1. c. 27	29 March 1585
An Act for the inning of Earith, and Plumpstead Marsh. (Repealed by Statute Law Revision Act 1948 (11 & 12 Geo. 6. c. 62))
Taxation Act 1584 (repealed)	27 Eliz. 1. c. 28	29 March 1585
An Act for one subsidy granted by the clergy. (Repealed by Statute Law Revision Act 1863 (26 & 27 Vict. c. 125))
Taxation (No. 2) Act 1584 (repealed)	27 Eliz. 1. c. 29	29 March 1585
An Act for one subsidy, and two fifteens and tenths granted by the temporarility. (Repealed by Statute Law Revision Act 1863 (26 & 27 Vict. c. 125))
Act of General Pardon 1584 (repealed)	27 Eliz. 1. c. 30	29 March 1585
An Act for the Queen's majesty's most gracious, general, and free pardon. (Repealed by Statute Law Revision Act 1863 (26 & 27 Vict. c. 125))
Government of the City of Westminster Act 1584 (repealed)	27 Eliz. 1. c. 31 (Note: Also listed as 27 Eliz. 1. 5 Pr.) (Note: This is the citation in The Statutes of the Realm.); 27 Eliz. 1. c. 17 Pr. (Note: This is the citation in The Statutes at Large.)	29 March 1585
An Act for the good government of the city or borough of Westminster in Middlesex. (Repealed by Court of Burgesses Scheme 1901 (SR&O 1901/811))

=== Private acts ===
Short title	Citation	Royal assent
Long title
Lyme Regis Pier Act 1584 (repealed)	27 Eliz. 1. c. 1 Pr. (Note: This is the citation in The Statutes of the Realm.); 27 Eliz. 1. c. 19 Pr. (Note: This is the citation in The Statutes at Large.)	29 March 1585
An Act for the maintenance of the pier or cob of Lynne Regis in the county of Dorsett. (Repealed by Lyme Regis, Bridport (West Bay) and Weymouth Harbour Revision Order 2026 (SI 2026/62))
Queen's College, Oxford Act 1584	27 Eliz. 1. c. 2 Pr. 27 Eliz. 1. c. 1 Pr.	29 March 1585
An Act for confirmation of her Majesty's letters patents to Queen's College in Oxford.
Clare Hall, Cambridge Act 1584	27 Eliz. 1. c. 3 Pr. 27 Eliz. 1. c. 2 Pr.	29 March 1585
An Act for confirmation of her Majesty's letters patents unton the masters, fellows and scholars of Clare-Hall in Cambridge.
Assurances by Bishop and Dean and Chapter of Exeter.	27 Eliz. 1. c. 4 Pr. 27 Eliz. 1. c. 3 Pr.	29 March 1585
An Act touching divers assurances made by the bishop and dean and chapters of Exeter.
Government of the City of Westminster Act 1584 (repealed)	27 Eliz. 1. c. 5 Pr. (Note: Also listed as 27 Eliz. 1. c. 31.); 27 Eliz. 1. c. 17 Pr.	29 March 1585
An Act for the good government of the city or borough of Westminster in Middlesex. (Repealed by Court of Burgesses Scheme 1901 (SR&O 1901/811))
Establishment of Countess of Huntingdon's jointure.	27 Eliz. 1. c. 6 Pr. 27 Eliz. 1. c. 18 Pr.	29 March 1585
An Act for the countess of Huntingdon's jointure.
Assurance of lands to Sir Thomas Lucie and others.	27 Eliz. 1. c. 7 Pr. 27 Eliz. 1. c. 9 Pr.	29 March 1585
An Act for assuring the manors of Haversham and Bishops Hampton to Sir Thomas Lucy and others.
Assurance of lands in Norfolk, Suffolk, Lincoln and Warwick to Lord Willoughby and Erisbie against the heirs and assigns of Walter Herenden.	27 Eliz. 1. c. 8 Pr. 27 Eliz. 1. c. 10 Pr.	29 March 1585
An Act for assuring of lands to the lord Willoughhby of Erisby, from Walter Erenden and his heirs.
Assurance of lands to Lord Hunsdon.	27 Eliz. 1. c. 9 Pr. 27 Eliz. 1. c. 7 Pr.	29 March 1585
An Act for the assuring of certain lands to the lord Hunsdon.
Lands of Lord Dacres and Lord Norris.	27 Eliz. 1. c. 10 Pr. 27 Eliz. 1. c. 14 Pr.	29 March 1585
An Act concerning the lord Dacres, and the lord Norries, and Sampsons Leonard, for the peaceable enjoying of lands.
Lord Thomas Howard's restitution in blood.	27 Eliz. 1. c. 11 Pr. 27 Eliz. 1. c. 5 Pr.	29 March 1585
An Act for the restitution of lord Thomas Howard.
Assurance of lands to George Chewne, Giles Fluyd, and Christopher Puckering.	27 Eliz. 1. c. 12 Pr. 27 Eliz. 1. c. 8 Pr.	29 March 1585
An Act for the assurance of certain lands to George Chowne, esquire, from Edward Fisher of Warwick.
Establishment of award between Robert, Lord Rich and Sir Thomas Barrington.	27 Eliz. 1. c. 13 Pr. 27 Eliz. 1. c. 16 Pr.	29 March 1585
An Act for the establishment of an award made between Robert lord Rich and Thomas Barrington, knight, and their heirs, &c.
Assurance of property in the City of London to Jonas Scott.	27 Eliz. 1. c. 14 Pr. 27 Eliz. 1. c. 12 Pr.	29 March 1585
An Act for the assurance of certain lands in London to Jonas Scott.
Payment of Edward Fisher's debts.	27 Eliz. 1. c. 15 Pr. 27 Eliz. 1. c. 11 Pr.	29 March 1585
An Act enabling Edward Fisher to sell certain lands for the payment of his debts.
Christ's Hospital in Sherburn Act 1584	27 Eliz. 1. c. 16 Pr. 27 Eliz. 1. c. 15 Pr.	29 March 1585
An Act for the foundation of Christ's hospital in Sherborn within the county palatine of Durham.
Better foundation and relief of the poor of Eastbridge Hospital, Canterbury.	27 Eliz. 1. c. 17 Pr. 27 Eliz. 1. c. 13 Pr.	29 March 1585
An Act for the confirmation of the foundation of the hospital of Eastbridge in Canterbury, (Note: Eastbridge Hospital, Canterbury.) with ordinances for government thereof, and for the better relief of the poor there.
New Windsor (Berkshire) Paving Act 1584	27 Eliz. 1. c. 18 Pr. 27 Eliz. 1. c. 6 Pr.	29 March 1585
An Act for paving of New Windsor in Berkshire.
Newark-upon-Trent (Nottinghamshire) Paving Act 1584 (repealed)	27 Eliz. 1. c. 19 Pr. 27 Eliz. 1. c. 4 Pr.	29 March 1585
An Act for paving of Newark upon Trent in Nottinghamshire. (Repealed by Newark-upon-Trent Improvement and Market Act 1798 (38 Geo. 3. c. xxvi))

=== Sources ===
- "27° Eliz.". The Statutes of the Realm. Vol. 4 Part 1: 1547 to 1584. pp. 703–764 – via HathiTrust.
- Pickering, Danby, ed. (1763). "Anno vicesimo septimo Elizabethæ". The Statutes at Large. Vol. 6: from the First Year of Queen Mary to the Thirty-fifth Year of Queen Elizabeth, inclusive. Cambridge: Joseph Bentham. pp. 349–389 – via Internet Archive.
- Pickering, Danby, ed. (1763). "Anno vicesimo septimo Elizabethæ". The Statutes at Large. Vol. 6: from the First Year of Queen Mary to the Thirty-fifth Year of Queen Elizabeth, inclusive. Cambridge: Joseph Bentham. pp. 349–389 – via Internet Archive.
- Journal of the House of Commons. Vol. 1 – 1547-1629. His Majesty's Stationery Office. 1802 – via British History Online.
- Journal of the House of Lords. Vol. 2: 1578-1614. London: His Majesty's Stationery Office. 1830 – via British History Online.
- Chronological Table of and Index to the Statutes. Vol. 1: To the End of the Session 59 Vict. Sess. 2 (1895) (13th ed.). London: Her Majesty's Stationery Office. 1896. p. 62 – via Google Books.
- Chronological Table of the Statutes: Covering the Period from 1235 to the End of 1971. London: Her Majesty's Stationery Office. 1972. p. 60. ISBN 978-0-11-840096-1 – via Google Books.
- "Chronological Tables of the Private and Personal Acts: Part 1 (1539–1601)". legislation.gov.uk. The National Archives.

== See also ==
- List of acts of the Parliament of England
