= Trials for Felony Act 1836 =

Act of the Parliament of the United Kingdom

Trials for Felony Act 1836 (Note: The citation of this act by this short title was authorised by section 1 of, and the first schedule to, the Short Titles Act 1896. Due to the repeal of those provisions it is now authorised by section 19(2) of the Interpretation Act 1978.)
- Act of Parliament
- Parliament of the United Kingdom
- Long title: An Act for enabling Persons indicted of Felony to make their Defence by Counsel or Attorney.
- Citation: 6 & 7 Will. 4. c. 114
- Territorial extent: England and Wales; Ireland; (Note: Section 5.)

Dates
- Royal assent: 20 August 1836
- Commencement: 1 October 1836 (Note: Section 1.)
- Repealed: 2 May 1986
Other legislation
Amended by	Summary Jurisdiction Act 1848; Statute Law Revision Act 1874; Criminal Law Act (Northern Ireland) 1967
Repealed by	Statute Law (Repeals) Act 1986

Status: Repealed

Text of statute as originally enacted

The Trials for Felony Act 1836 (6 & 7 Will. 4. c. 114) was an act of the Parliament of the United Kingdom.

== Subsequent developments ==
This act was extended to the Turks and Caicos Islands by the act of the Legislative Council 4 Vic. c. 30 (TC).

The act was repealed in part by the Summary Jurisdiction Act 1848 (11 & 12 Vict. c. 43).

Section 5 of the act from "this Act" to "Parliament; and that" was repealed by section 1 of, and the schedule to, the Statute Law Revision Act 1874 (37 & 38 Vict. c. 35), which came into force on 16 July 1874.

The words "and be it further enacted, that" wherever they occurred were repealed by section 1 of, and the schedule to, the Statute Law Revision (No. 2) Act 1888 (51 & 52 Vict. c. 3), which came into force on 24 December 1888.

The preamble to, and section 1 of the act to "October next" of, the act were repealed by section 1 of, and the first schedule to, the Statute Law Revision (No. 2) Act 1890 (53 & 54 Vict. c. 51), which came into force on 18 August 1890.

Section 1 of the act was repealed for England and Wales by section 10(2) of, and part III of schedule 3 to, the Criminal Law Act 1967, which came into force on 1 January 1968.

The whole act was repealed for Northern Ireland by section 15(2) of, and schedule 2 to, the Criminal Law Act (Northern Ireland) 1967.

In a report dated 27 September 1985, the Law Commission and the Scottish Law Commission said that section 4 was the only provision that had not been repealed. They said that it was redundant. They recommended that the act be repealed

The whole act was repealed by section 1(1) of, and group 1 of part I of schedule 1 to, the Statute Law (Repeals) Act 1986, which came into force on 2 May 1986.

The whole act was repealed for the Republic of Ireland by section 16 of, and the Third Schedule to, the Criminal Law Act 1997.
