= Summary jurisdiction =

Summary jurisdiction, in the widest sense of the phrase, in English law includes the power asserted by courts of record to deal brevi manu (directly) with contempts of court without the intervention of a jury. Probably the power was originally exercisable only when the fact was notorious, i.e. done in presence of the court. But it has long been exercised as to contempts outside of a court.

The term is also applied to the special powers given by statute or rules to the High Court of Justice and to county courts for dealing with certain classes of causes or matters by methods more simple and expeditious than the ordinary procedure of an action. But the phrase in modern times is applied almost exclusively to forms of jurisdiction exercised by justices of the peace out of general or quarter sessions, and without the assistance of a jury.

== Overview ==
Ever since the creation of the office of justice of the peace the tendency of English legislation has been to enable them to deal with minor offences without a jury. Legislation was necessary because, as Blackstone says, except in the case of contempts the common law is a stranger to trial without a jury, and because even when an offence is created by statute the procedure for trying must be by indictment and trial before a jury, unless by the statute creating the offence or some other statute another mode of trial is provided. In one remarkable instance power is given by section 4 of the Frivolous Arrests Act 1725 (12 Geo. 1. c. 29; repealed by the Statute Law Revision Act 1948) to judges of the superior courts summarily to sentence to transportation (penal servitude) a solicitor practising after conviction of barratry, forgery or perjury (Stephen, A Digest of the Criminal Law, 6th ed., 113).

In other words all the summary jurisdiction of justices of the peace is the creation of statute. The history of the gradual development of the summary jurisdiction of justices of the peace is stated in Stephen's A History of the Criminal Law of England, vol. i. ch. 4. The result of legislation is that summary jurisdiction has been conferred by statutes and by-laws as to innumerable petty offences of a criminal or quasi-criminal character (most of which in French law would be described as contraventions), ranging through every letter of the alphabet. The most important perhaps are those under the Army, Game, Highway, Licensing, Merchant Shipping, Post Office, Public Health, Revenue and Vagrancy Acts.

Summary Jurisdiction Act 1857 (Note: The citation of this act by this short title was authorised by section 1 of, and the first schedule to, the Short Titles Act 1896. Due to the repeal of those provisions it is now authorised by section 19(2) of the Interpretation Act 1978.)
- Act of Parliament
- Parliament of the United Kingdom
- Long title: An Act to improve the Administration of the Law so far as respects summary Proceedings before Justices of the Peace.
- Citation: 20 & 21 Vict. c. 43
- Territorial extent: England and Wales; Ireland; (Note: Section 15.)

Dates
- Royal assent: 17 August 1857
- Commencement: 17 August 1857 (Note: The Acts of Parliament (Commencement) Act 1793.)
- Repealed: 5 November 1993
Other legislation
Amended by	Magistrates' Courts Act 1952; Administration of Justice Act 1965; Statute Law (Repeals) Act 1977
Repealed by	Statute Law (Repeals) Act 1993

Status: Repealed

Text of statute as originally enacted

Summary Jurisdiction Act 1879 (Note: Section 1.)
- Act of Parliament
- Parliament of the United Kingdom
- Long title: An Act to amend the Law relating to the Summary Jurisdiction of Magistrates.
- Citation: 42 & 43 Vict. c. 49
- Territorial extent: England and Wales (Note: Section 2.)

Dates
- Royal assent: 11 August 1879
- Commencement: 1 January 1880 (Note: Section 3.)
- Repealed: 1 January 1972
Other legislation
Amends	Criminal Justice Act 1855
Amended by	Summary Jurisdiction Act 1884; Summary Jurisdiction Act 1899; Costs in Criminal Cases Act 1908; Post Office Act 1908; Children Act 1908; National Assistance Act 1948; Criminal Justice Act 1948; Justices of the Peace Act 1949; Costs in Criminal Cases Act 1952; Magistrates' Courts Act 1952
Repealed by	Courts Act 1971

Status: Repealed

Text of statute as originally enacted

Summary Jurisdiction (Process) Act 1881
- Act of Parliament
- Parliament of the United Kingdom
- Long title: An Act to amend the Law respecting the Service of Process of Courts of Summary Jurisdiction in England and Scotland.
- Citation: 44 & 45 Vict. c. 24
- Territorial extent: England and Wales; Scotland

Dates
- Royal assent: 18 July 1881
- Commencement: 1 October 1881
Other legislation
Amended by	Statute Law Revision Act 1894; Maintenance Orders Act 1950; Statute Law (Repeals) Act 1986; Statute Law (Repeals) Act 1993; Tribunals, Courts and Enforcement Act 2007

Status: Amended

Text of statute as originally enacted

Text of the Summary Jurisdiction (Process) Act 1881 as in force today (including any amendments) within the United Kingdom, from legislation.gov.uk.

Summary Jurisdiction Act 1899 (Note: Section 4.)
- Act of Parliament
- Parliament of the United Kingdom
- Long title: An Act to amend the Summary Jurisdiction Act, 1879.
- Citation: 62 & 63 Vict. c. 22
- Territorial extent: United Kingdom

Dates
- Royal assent: 9 August 1899
- Commencement: 9 August 1899
- Repealed: 1 June 1953
Other legislation
Amends	Summary Jurisdiction Act 1879
Repealed by	Magistrates' Courts Act 1952

Status: Repealed

Text of statute as originally enacted

A court of summary jurisdiction was defined in the Interpretation Act 1889 (52 & 53 Vict. c. 63) as "any justice or justices of the peace or other magistrate, by whatever name called, to whom jurisdiction is given by, or who is authorized to act under, the Summary Jurisdiction Acts, whether in England, Wales or Ireland, and whether acting under the Summary Jurisdiction Acts or any of them or any other act or by virtue of his commission or under the common law" (Interpretation Act 1889, s. 13 [11]). This definition did not apply to justices of the peace sitting to hold a preliminary inquiry as to indictable offences, or in the discharge of their quasi-administrative functions as licensing authority. The 1889 Act was replaced by the Interpretation Act 1978, which defines a summary offence as one triable only summarily. The Magistrates' Courts Act 1980 is the modern law giving magistrates' courts in England and Wales the jurisdiction to try offences summarily, including offences triable either way.

The expression "Summary Jurisdiction Acts" means, as to England and Wales, the Summary Jurisdiction Act 1848 (11 & 12 Vict. c. 42) and Summary Jurisdiction Act 1879 (42 & 43 Vict. c. 49) and any act amending these acts or either of them. These acts define the procedure to be followed by justices in those cases in which they are empowered by statute to hear and determine civil or criminal cases without the intervention of a jury or the forms of an action or indictment at law or a suit in equity. Besides these two acts the procedure as to the exercise of summary jurisdiction is also regulated by the Summary Jurisdiction Act 1857 (20 & 21 Vict. c. 43), the Summary Jurisdiction (Process) Act 1881 (44 & 45 Vict. c. 24), the Summary Jurisdiction Act 1884 (47 & 48 Vict. c. 43), and the Summary Jurisdiction Act 1899 (62 & 63 Vict. c. 22).

The Summary Jurisdiction Act 1848 repealed and consolidated the provisions of a large number of earlier acts. The Summary Jurisdiction Act 1857 provided a mode of appeal to the High Court by case stated as to questions of law raised in summary proceedings. The Summary Jurisdiction Act 1879 amended the procedure in many details with the view of uniformity, and enlarged the powers of justices to deal summarily with certain classes of offences ordinarily punishable on indictment. The act gives power to make rules regulating details of procedure.

The rules in force in 1911 were made in 1886, but have since been amended in certain details. The Summary Jurisdiction Act 1884 swept away special forms of procedure contained in a large number of statutes, and substituted the procedure of the Summary Jurisdiction Acts. The Summary Jurisdiction Act 1899 added the obtaining of property by false pretences to the list of indictable offences that could sub modo be summarily dealt with. The statutes above mentioned form a kind of code as to procedure and to some extent also as to jurisdiction.

== Statutory authority ==
As already stated, to enable a justice to deal summarily with an offence, whether created by statute or by-law, some statutory authority must be shown. A very large number of petty offences (contraventions) have been created (e.g. poaching, minor forms of theft, malicious damage and assault), and are annually being created

1. by legislation, or
2. by the by-laws of corporations made under statutory authority, or
3. by departments of state acting under such authority.

The two latter classes differ from the first in the necessity of proving by evidence the existence of the by-law or statutory rule, and if need be that it is intra vires.

In the case of offences primarily punishable only on summary conviction, the accused, if the maximum punishment is imprisonment for over three months, can choose a jury trial (Summary Jurisdiction Act 1879, s. 17).

In the case of offences primarily punishable only on indictment, power to convict summarily is given in the following cases:

1. All indictable offences (except homicide) committed by children over seven and under twelve, if the court thinks it expedient and the parent or guardian does not object (1879, s. 10).
2. All indictable offences (except homicide) committed by young persons of twelve and under sixteen, if the young person consents after being told of his right to be tried by a jury (1879, S. 11; 1899, s. 2).
3. The indictable offences specified in sched. 1, col. 2 of the Summary Jurisdiction Act 1879 and in thSummary Jurisdiction Act 1899, if committed by adults, if they consent to summary trial after being told of their right to be tried by a jury (1879, s. 12).
4. The indictable offences specified in sched. 1, col. I. of the Summary Jurisdiction Act 1879 and theSummary Jurisdiction Act 1899, if committed by an adult who pleads guilty after due caution that if he does so, he is summarily convicted (1879, s. 13).

Adults cannot be summarily dealt with under 3 or 4 if the offence is punishable by law with penal servitude owing to previous conviction or indictment of the accused (1879, s. 14).

With all indictable offences under heads 1 to 4, summary jurisdiction depends on consent of the accused or a person with authority over him after receiving due information as to the right to go to a jury, and the punishments on summary conviction in such cases are not those that could be imposed after conviction or indictment, but were limited as follows:

1. Imprisonment for not more than one month or fine not exceeding 40s. and (or) whipping of male children (not more than six strokes with a birch); sending to an industrial school or reformatory.
2. Imprisonment with or without hard labour for not more than three months or fine not exceeding £10 and (or) whipping of males (not more than twelve strokes with a birch); sending to an industrial school or reformatory.
3. Imprisonment for not more than three months with or without hard labour or fine not exceeding £20.
4. Imprisonment with or without hard labour for not over six months.

These limitations of punishment have had a potent effect in inducing culprits to avoid the greater risks involved in a jury trial.

Where the offence is indictable the accused is brought before the justices either on arrest without warrant or on warrant or summons under the Indictable Offences Act 1848. and the summary jurisdiction procedure does not apply till the necessary option has been taken.

Where the offence is indictable only at the election of the accused the summary jurisdiction procedure applies until on being informed of his option the accused elects for jury trial (Summary Jurisdiction Act 1879, s. 17).

== Procedure ==
In the case of an offence punishable on summary conviction the procedure is ordinarily as follows:

Information, usually oral, is laid before one or more justices of the peace alleging the commission of the offence. An information must not state more than a single offence, but great latitude is given as to amending at the hearing any defects in the mode of stating an offence. Upon receipt of the information the justice may issue his summons for the attendance of the accused at a time and place named to answer the charge. It is usual to summon to a petty sessional court (i.e. two justices or a stipendiary magistrate, or, in the City of London, an alderman). The summons is usually served by a constable. If the accused does not attend in obedience to the summons, after proof of service the court may either issue a warrant for his arrest or may deal with the charge in his absence.

Occasionally a warrant is issued in place of a summons in the first instance, in which case the information must be laid in writing and be verified by oath. The proceedings must be begun, i.e. by laying the information, not later than six months after the commission of the offence, unless by some particular statute another period is named or unless the offence is what is called a continuing offence.

In a certain number of summary cases the accused is arrested under statutory authority without application to a justice, e.g. in the case of rogues and vagabonds and certain classes of offences committed in the street in view of a constable or by night. Whether the accused is brought before the court on arrest with or without warrant or attends in obedience to summons, the procedure at the hearing is the same. The hearing is ordinarily before a petty sessional court, i.e. before two or more justices sitting at their regular place of meeting or some place temporarily appointed as the substitute for the regular court-house, or before a stipendiary magistrate, or in the city of London an alderman, sitting at a place where he may by law do alone what in other places may be done by two justices. (Note: Summary Jurisdiction Act 1879, s. 20; 1889, s. 13) A single justice sitting alone in the ordinary court-house or two or more justices sitting together at an occasional court-house have certain jurisdiction to hear and determine the case, but cannot order a fine of more than 20s. or imprisonment for more than fourteen days. (Note: Summary Jurisdiction Act 1879, s. 20 [7])

The hearing must be in open court, and parties may appear by counsel or solicitor. If both parties appear, the justices must hear and determine the case. If the defendant does not appear, the court may hear and determine in his absence, or may issue a warrant and adjourn the hearing until his apprehension. Where the defendant is represented by solicitor or counsel but is not himself present it is usual, except in serious cases, to proceed in his absence. If the defendant is present the substance of the information is stated to him and he is asked whether he is guilty or not guilty. If he pleads guilty the court may proceed to conviction. If he does not the court hears the case, and witnesses for the prosecution and defence are examined and cross-examined. If the complainant does not appear, the justices may dismiss the complaint or adjourn the hearing.

If necessary rebutting evidence may be called, the prosecutor is not allowed to reply in the case of the defendant. On the completion of the evidence the court proceeds to convict or acquit. Where the case is proved but is trifling the court may, without proceeding to conviction, make an order dismissing the information subject to payment of damages for injury or compensation for loss up to £10 or any higher limit fixed by statute as to the offence, and costs, or discharging the accused conditionally on his giving security for good behaviour and on paying damages and costs. (Note: Probation of Offenders Act 1907 (7 Edw. 7. c. 17) s. 1) To this order probationary conditions may be attached (s. 2). Subject to this provision, the punishment depends, as a general rule on the statute or by-law that defines the offence, and consists in imprisonment and (or) fine, except in cases where a minimum fine is stipulated for by a treaty, etc., with a foreign state, e.g. in sea fishery conventions. The court may mitigate the fine in the case of a first offence, even in a revenue case, or may reduce the period of imprisonment and impose it without hard labour, or substitute a fine not exceeding 25 for imprisonment. A scale is prescribed for imprisonment on failure to pay money, fines, or costs, adjudged to be paid on a conviction, or in default of a sufficient distress to satisfy the sum adjudged. (Note: Summary Jurisdiction Act 1879, s. 5) Instead of sending the defendant to prison for not paying fine and costs the court may direct its levy by distress warrant, or may accept payment by instalments. In the case of distress the wearing apparel and bedding of the defendant and his family, and to the value of £5 the tools and implements of his trade, may not be taken. (Note: Summary Jurisdiction Act 1879, s. 21) If the defendant after going to prison can pay part of the money his imprisonment is reduced proportionally. (Note: Prison Act 1898, s. 9) The imprisonment is without hard labour unless hard labour is specially authorized by the act on which the conviction is founded. The maximum term of imprisonment without the option of a fine is in most cases six months, but depends on the particular statute. Imprisonment under order of a court of summary jurisdiction is in the common gaol (5 Hen. 4. c. 10), i.e. in a local prison declared by the Home Secretary to be the common gaol for the county, etc., for which the court acts. The place of imprisonment during remands or in the case of youthful offenders may in certain cases be elsewhere than in a prison.

The court has power to order costs to be paid by the prosecutor or the defendant. Where the order is made on a conviction it is enforceable by imprisonment in default of payment or sufficient distress.

The extent of the local jurisdiction of justices exercising summary jurisdiction is defined by section 46 of the Summary Jurisdiction Act 1879 with reference to offences committed on the boundaries of two jurisdictions or during journeys or on the sea or rivers or in harbours.

Proceedings under the Bastardy Acts are regulated by special legislation, but as to proof of service and the enforcement of orders and appeals are assimilated to convictions under the Summary Jurisdiction Acts. The same rule applies (except as to appeals) to orders made under the Summary Jurisdiction (Married Women) Act 1895, as amended by the Licensing Act 1902.

A warrant of arrest is executed by the constable or person to whom it is directed within the local jurisdiction of the issuing court; or a fresh pursuit within seven miles of its boundaries, without endorsement, in the rest of England and Wales, and in Scotland, the Channel Islands and Isle of Man after endorsement by a competent magistrate of the place where the accused is, and in Ireland by a justice of the peace or an inspector of constabulary. An English summons to a defendant or witness, except in respect of civil debts, is served in Scotland after endorsement by a competent magistrate there. (Note: Summary Jurisdiction Process Act 1881 (44 & 45 Vict. c. 24)) The attendance of a witness who is in prison is obtained by writ of habeas corpus or by a secretary of state's order under the Prison Act 1898. If a witness does not attend on summons, he can be brought to the court by warrant, and if he will not answer questions lawfully put to him may be sent to prison for seven days or until he sooner consents to answer.

== Civil jurisdiction ==
In cases where justices have a summary civil jurisdiction, e.g. as to certain civil debts recoverable summarily, or to make orders to do or to abstain from doing certain acts, e.g. with reference to nuisances and building, the procedure differs in certain details from that in criminal cases.

1. The summons is issued on a complaint, which need not be in writing nor on oath, and not on an information, and warrants of arrest cannot be issued.
2. The rules as to the evidence of the defendant and spouse are the same as in civil actions.
3. The court's decision is by order and not by conviction.
4. The order if for payment of a civil debt or costs in connexion therewith is enforceable by distress and sale of the defendant's effects or by imprisonment, but only on proof that the defendant has had since the order means of paying and has refused or neglected to pay (1879, s. 35).

Proceedings for the enforcement of local rates are not affected by the Summary Jurisdiction Acts except as to the power of submitting to the High Court questions of law arising on a summons to enforce rates (re Allen, 1894, 2 Q.B., 924). The functions of justices as to such rates are sometimes but not quite accurately described as ministerial, for their powers of inquiry though limited are judicial and of a quasi-criminal character.

== Appeal ==
The orders and convictions of a court of summary jurisdiction are in many cases appealable to quarter sessions. The right to appeal is always dependent on the specific provisions of a statute. The Summary Jurisdiction Act 1879 (42 & 43 Vict. c. 49) gives a general power of appeal against an adjudication on conviction (but not on plea of guilty) to imprisonment without the option of a fine, whether as punishment for an offence or for failure to do or abstaining from doing any act, other than compliance with an order to pay money or find security or enter into recognizances or to find sureties (1879, s. 19). The procedure on the appeals is regulated and made uniform by the acts of 1879, ss. 31, 32; and 1884. These provisions are supplementary of the particular provisions of many statutes authorizing an appeal.

The decisions of courts of summary jurisdiction on points of law are generally reviewed by a case stated for the opinion of the High Court under the acts of 1857 and 1879, but are occasionally corrected by the common law remedies of mandamus, prohibition or certiorari. The application of the last-named remedy is restricted by many statutes. The court of appeal has jurisdiction to review judgments and orders of the High Court dealing with appeals, etc., from the decisions of justices in the exercise of their civil jurisdiction; but not when the subject-matter is a criminal cause or matter.

In proceedings between husband and wife for separation orders there is a special form of appeal on facts as well as law to the probate, divorce and admiralty division of the High Court: Summary Jurisdiction (Married Women) Act 1895; Licensing Act 1902, s. 5.
