= Common Informers Act 1575 =

Act of the Parliament of England

Common Informers Act 1575 (Note: The citation of this act by this short title was authorised by section 5 of, and the second schedule to, the Statute Law Revision Act 1948. Due to the repeal of those provisions, it is now authorised by section 19(2) of the Interpretation Act 1978.)
- Act of Parliament
- Parliament of England
- Long title: An Acte to redresse Disorders in Common Informers upon Penall Lawes. (Note: These words are printed against this act in the second column of the second schedule to the Statute Law Revision Act 1948, which is headed "Title".)
- Citation: 18 Eliz. 1. c. 5
- Territorial extent: England and Wales

Dates
- Royal assent: 15 March 1576
- Commencement: 22 April 1576 (Note: Section 1. The Feast of Easter.)
- Repealed: 29 July 1959

Other legislation
- Amended by: Common Informers Act 1584; Statute Law Revision Act 1863; Statute Law Revision Act 1888
- Repealed by: Statute Law Revision Act 1959
- Relates to: Common Informers Act 1588; Common Informers Act 1951

Status: Repealed

Text of statute as originally enacted

The Common Informers Act 1575 (18 Eliz. 1. c. 5) was an act of the Parliament of England.

== Provisions ==
Section 9 of the act provided that the act would remain in force from the Feast of Easter until the end of the first session of the next parliament.

== Subsequent developments ==
Common Informers Act 1584
- Act of Parliament
- Parliament of England
- Long title: An Act for the continuance of a former statute, intituled, "An Act to redress disorders in common informers upon penal statutes," made in the eighteenth year of the Queen's majesty's reign.
- Citation: 27 Eliz. 1. c. 10
- Territorial extent: England and Wales

Dates
- Royal assent: 14 September 1585
- Commencement: 23 November 1584 (Note: Start of session.)
- Repealed: 28 July 1863

Other legislation
- Amends: Common Informers Act 1575
- Repealed by: Statute Law Revision Act 1863
- Relates to: Common Informers Act 1588; Common Informers Act 1951

Status: Repealed

Text of statute as originally enacted

The whole act was made perpetual by section 1 of the Common Informers Act 1584 (27 Eliz. 1. c. 10).

Section 4 of the act, from "and that yf any suche Informer" to the end, was repealed by section 2 of, and part I of the schedule to, the Civil Procedure Acts Repeal Act 1879 (42 & 43 Vict. c. 59), which came into force on 15 August 1879.

Section 9 of the act was repealed by section 1 of, and the schedule to, the Statute Law Revision Act 1863 (26 & 27 Vict. c. 125), which came into force on 28 July 1863.

The whole act was repealed by section 2 of, and the second schedule to, the Statute Law Revision Act 1959 (7 & 8 Eliz. 2. c. 68), which came into force on 29 July 1959.
