= Stage Carriages Act 1832 =

Act of the Parliament of the United Kingdom

Stage Carriages Act 1832 (Note: The citation of this act by this short title was authorised by section 1 of, and the first schedule to, the Short Titles Act 1896. Due to the repeal of those provisions it is now authorised by section 19(2) of the Interpretation Act 1978.)
- Act of Parliament
- Parliament of the United Kingdom
- Long title: An Act to repeal the Duties under the Management of the Commissioners of Stamps on Stage Carriages and on Horses let for Hire in Great Britain, and to grant other Duties in lieu thereof; and also to consolidate and amend the Laws relating thereto.
- Citation: 2 & 3 Will. 4. c. 120
- Territorial extent: United Kingdom

Dates
- Royal assent: 16 August 1832
- Commencement: 10 October 1832 (in part); 1 February 1833 (in part); (Note: Section 1 and section 119.)
- Repealed: 21 May 1981
Other legislation
Amends	See § Repealed enactments
Repeals/revokes	See § Repealed enactments
Amended by	London Hackney Carriages Act 1833; Revenue Act 1869; Statute Law Revision (No. 2) Act 1888; Statute Law Revision Act 1890; Public Authorities Protection Act 1893; Road Traffic Act 1930; Statute Law Revision Act 1959
Repealed by	Statute Law (Repeals) Act 1981; County of Lancashire Act 1984

Status: Repealed

Text of statute as originally enacted

The Stage Carriages Act 1832 (2 & 3 Will. 4. c. 120) was an act of the Parliament of the United Kingdom that consolidated the law relating to the duties and licensing of stage carriages, and of horses let for hire, in Great Britain.

== Provisions ==
=== Repealed enactments ===
Sections 1 and 2 of the act repealed ten enactments, listed in those sections. The repeal did not affect the prior repeal, by any of the repealed enactments, of a former act, or the recovery of any duty, arrears of duty, debt, penalty or forfeiture which had already accrued or been incurred before the appointed dates of repeal, which continued to be recoverable as if the act had not been passed.

Citation	Short title	Description	Extent of repeal
25 Geo. 3. c. 51	Duties on Post Horses, etc. Act 1785	An Act for repealing the Duties on Licences taken out by Persons letting Horses for the Purpose of travelling Post, and on Horses let to Hire for travelling Post, and by Time, and on Stage Coaches, and for granting other Duties in Lieu thereof, and also additional Duties on Horses let to Hire for travelling Post, and by Time.	The whole act.
44 Geo. 3. c. 98	Stamp Act 1804	An Act to repeal the several Duties under the Commissioners for managing the Duties upon stamped Vellum, Parchment, and Paper, in Great Britain, and to grant new and additional Duties in lieu thereof.	So much as relates to the painting required on carriages employed as public stage coaches for conveying passengers for hire, and to the number of inside passengers to be carried in such a carriage.
50 Geo. 3. c. 48	Stage Coaches, etc. (Great Britain) Act 1810	An Act to repeal Three Acts, made in the Twenty-eighth, Thirtieth and Forty-sixth Years of His present Majesty, for limiting the Number of Persons to be carried on the Outside of Stage Coaches or other Carriages, and to enact other Regulations for carrying the Objects of the said Acts into Effect.	The whole act.
53 Geo. 3. c. 108	Stamps Act 1813	An Act for altering, explaining and amending an Act of the Forty-eighth Year of His Majesty's Reign, for granting Stamp Duties in Great Britain, with regard to the Duties on Re-issuable Promissory Notes, and on Conveyances on the Sale and Mortgage of Property; for better enabling the Commissioners of Stamps to give Relief in Cases of spoiled Stamps, and to remit Penalties; for exempting certain Instruments from Stamp Duty; and for better securing the Duties on Stage Coaches.	So much as relates to the duties granted on coaches and other carriages employed as public stage coaches for conveying passengers for hire, and on licences for keeping the same, and to the time of granting such licences or their continuance in force.
55 Geo. 3. c. 185	Plate Duties Act 1815	An Act for repealing the Stamp Office Duties on Advertisements, Almanacks, Newspapers, Gold and Silver Plate, Stage Coaches and Licences for keeping Stage Coaches, now payable in Great Britain; and for granting new Duties in lieu thereof.	So much as relates to the duties on stage coaches and on licences for keeping stage coaches, the offences relating to such duties and licences, the licences to be taken out by the owners of hackney coaches employed as stage coaches, and the owners or drivers of stage coaches taking up passengers as allowed by that act.
3 Geo. 4. c. 95	Duties on Stage-coaches, etc. Act 1822	An Act to reduce the Rate of Duties payable in respect of certain Carriages used and employed for the Purpose of conveying Passengers for Hire, and to make Regulations and Provisions relating to Stage Coaches and the Duties thereon.	The whole act.
7 Geo. 4. c. 33	Licensing of Stage Coaches Act 1826	An Act to make further Regulations relating to the Licensing of Stage Coaches.	The whole act.
9 Geo. 4. c. 49	Stamp Duties Act 1828	An Act to amend the Laws in force relating to the Stamp Duties on Sea Insurances, on Articles of Clerkship, on Certificates of Writers to the Signet, and of Conveyancers and others, on Licences to Dealers in Gold and Silver Plate, and Pawnbrokers, on Drafts on Bankers, and on Licences for Stage Coaches in Great Britain, and on Receipts in Ireland.	So much as relates to stage coaches or other carriages kept, used or employed to convey passengers for hire, or to the recovery of a fine, penalty or forfeiture incurred in relation to such stage coaches or carriages.
2 Geo. 3. c. 15	Fish Carriage Act 1762	An Act for the better supplying the Cities of London and Westminster with Fish, and to reduce the present exorbitant Price thereof; and to protect and encourage Fishermen.	So much as relates to the penalty imposed on the driver of a fish carriage for taking up or suffering a passenger to be carried in that carriage.
4 Geo. 4. c. 62	Duties on Horses Act 1823	An Act to repeal the Duties upon Horses let to hire for the Purpose of travelling in Great Britain, and to grant other Duties in lieu thereof; and to provide for letting the same to farm.	The whole act.

== Subsequent developments ==
The whole act, except in so far as it applies to the Blackpool tramway system, was repealed by section 1(1) of, and part X of schedule 1 to, the Statute Law (Repeals) Act 1981, which came into force on 21 May 1981. The repeal was made on the recommendation of the Law Commission and the Scottish Law Commission, who had identified the act as no longer of practical utility save for its continuing application to the Blackpool tramway.
