= John Jervis (judge) =

English lawyer and judge (1802–1856)

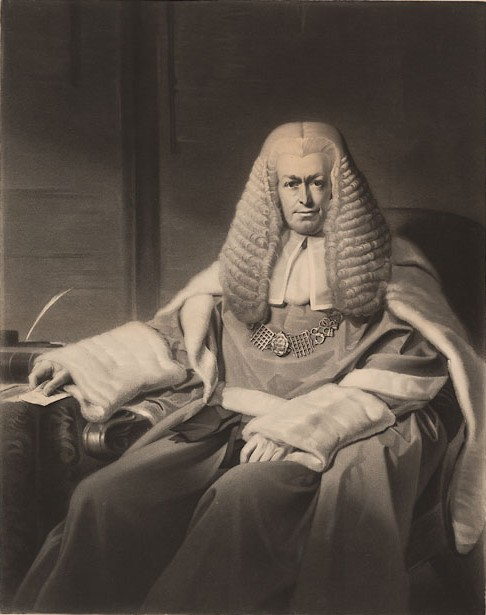
Sir John Jervis.

Sir John Jervis, PC (12 January 1802 – 1 November 1856) was an English lawyer, law reformer and Attorney General in the administration of Lord John Russell. He subsequently became a judge and enjoyed a career as a robust but intelligent and innovative jurist, a career cut short by his early and sudden death.

== Early life ==
The son of Thomas Jervis, he was educated at Westminster School and Trinity College, Cambridge, though he did not graduate, apparently preferring to take a commission as an officer in the British Army. However, after two years he returned to study law being called to the bar by the Middle Temple in 1824. Jervis followed his father onto the Oxford circuit and the Chester and north Wales circuit and built a substantial practice, being appointed a postman of the Court of Exchequer. He was offered the distinction of Queen's Counsel in 1837 but, aspiring to a political career, he declined, managing to obtain a patent of precedence instead.

== Legal author (1826–1832) ==
Between 1826 and 1832, Jervis collaborated in law reporting with Charles John Crompton (Crompton & Jervis) and was also the co-reporter in Younge & Jervis. Jervis's Office and Duties of Coroners (1829) remains the leading practitioners' text on coroners and inquests with a 13th edition due in late 2007. He undertook a major rewrite of Archbold Criminal Pleading, Evidence and Practice to produce the 4th edition (1831) and went on to edit the 5th to 8th editions.

Jervis went on to author four editions of All the Rules of the Courts of King's Bench and Common Pleas and Exchequer (1832–1839) and established his reputation as a leading scholar of procedure so that in 1850 he was appointed chair of a commission to inquire into practice and procedure at the common law courts, alongside James Shaw Willes and George Wilshere, 1st Baron Bramwell. The commission's findings led to the Common Law Procedure Acts 1852 and 1854 (15 & 16 Vict. c. 76 and 17 & 18 Vict. c. 135) which started the process of rationalising the English courts, until then still hampered by much medieval practice, and creating the modern system.

== Political career (1832–1850) ==
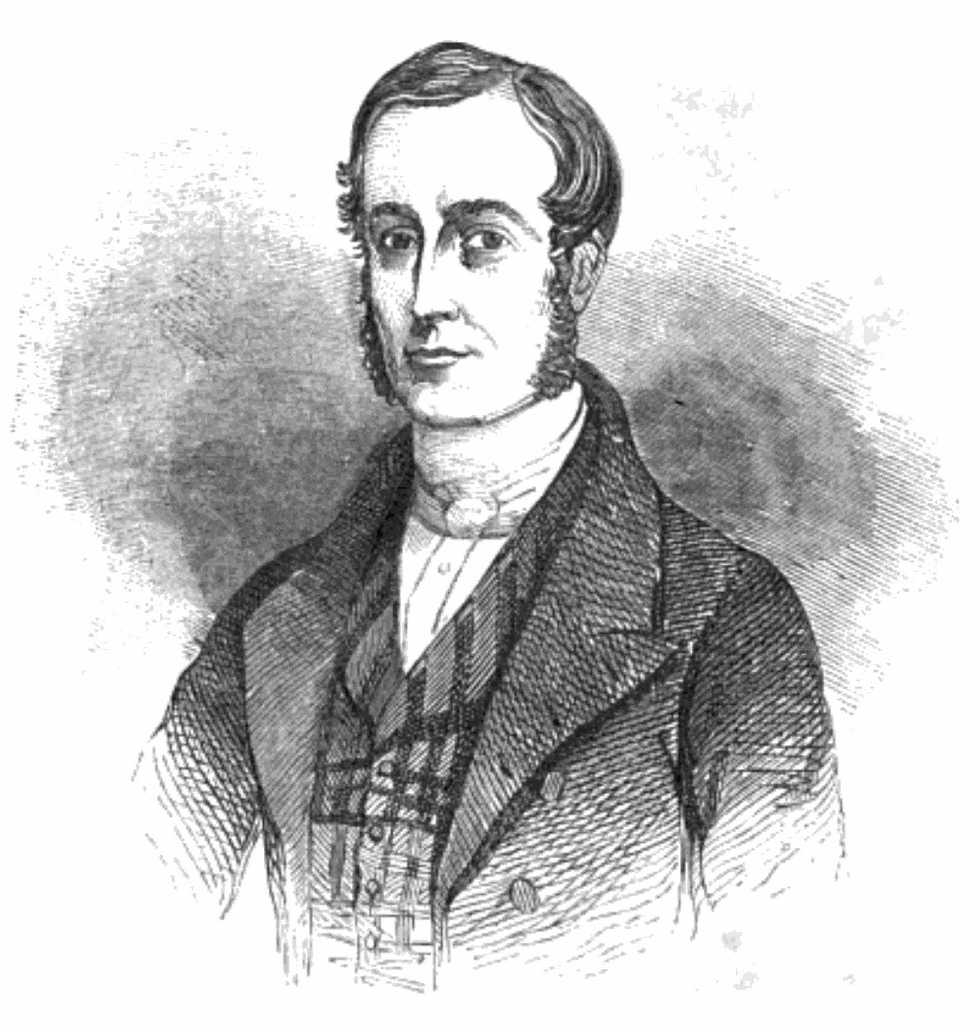
Sir John Jervis, 1847

Jervis was elected Liberal Member of Parliament for Chester in 1832 and held the seat until he became a judge in 1850. Jervis was never overly concerned with local politics and was distant as a constituency MP, even being censured in the Liberal Chester Chronicle for his inaction over the River Dee Bill and his overly-insistent attempts to ensure that his son was nominated as candidate in his stead when he stood down. Jervis did however take an uncharacteristic interest in the Chester Criminals' Execution Bill (1835), and the Weaver Churches Act 1840. Jervis was appointed Solicitor-General in 1846, becoming Attorney General three days later when Sir Thomas Wilde was appointed a judge. Jervis was knighted on 1 August 1846.

Jervis was Attorney General while the revolutions of 1848 were unfolding across Europe and affecting events in the UK. The collateral domestic civil unrest resulted in the speedy enactment of the Treason Felony Act 1848 (11 & 12 Vict. c. 12) and Jervis was involved in the drafting and promotion of the Bill. The Act in turn generated a heavy workload for Jervis in running prosecutions against Chartist activists. Jervis won all such prosecution and achieved some fame and honour, being considered for high judicial office.

=== The Jervis Acts ===
By 1848, the institution of Justice of the Peace in England and Wales had fallen into disrepute in some legal circles, its statutory basis dating back to the sixteenth century. Jervis was responsible for sponsoring, drafting and all but single-handedly guiding through the House of Commons three bills to reform the criminal and civil roles of a Justice of the Peace in England and Wales:

- Indictable Offences Act 1848 (11 & 12 Vict. c.42);
- Summary Jurisdiction Act 1848; and
- Justices Protection Act 1848 (11 & 12 Vict. c. 44).

The Acts won considerable praise as soon as they came into force though they did later attract criticism for their verbose style. In retrospect, Getzler expresses the opinion that the system of local justices would have fallen into further disrepute and ultimate decline and desuetude without these reforms. These Acts largely defined the modern system of summary and indictable offences within the magistrates' courts.

The Indictable Offences Act 1848 is important in that it is the first codification of the police caution in England and Wales, in the words:

Having heard the evidence, do you wish to say anything in answer to the charge? You are not obliged to say anything unless you desire to do so, but whatever you say will be taken down in writing and may be given in evidence against you at your trial.

The first two Acts defined the duties of Justices acting other than at quarter sessions (i.e. "out of sessions"). Jervis achieved consistency of practice by appending extensive forms and precedents to the Acts so as to provide a straightforward means by which Justices could comply though allowing them, at least the perception of, freedom to adapt to local circumstances. The prudent Justice follows precedent and this was a character trait a future Attorney General, Alexander Cockburn, would use in the Common Law Procedure Act 1852 and the Common Law Procedure Act 1854.

A fourth Act, the Petty Sessions Act 1849, proscribed the holding of petty sessions in "unsuitable" premises such as public houses, though it was delayed because the Bill's provisions as to salaries for magistrates' clerks and statutory scales for court fees proved unacceptable.

== Judicial career (1850–1856) ==
Jervis was appointed Chief Justice of the Common Pleas and appointed a Privy Councillor. In 1854, he heard the case of Talbot v. Laroche, a legal action pivotal to the history of photography. His greatest judicial achievement, however, was the creation of the "indoor management rule" or rule in Turquand's case, giving protection to third parties who deal with a company in good faith without knowledge that the company has not followed its own internal procedures.

In 1854, Jervis was appointed to the Royal Commission for Consolidating the Statute Law, a royal commission to consolidate existing statutes and enactments of English law.

Jervis died suddenly, possibly of lung cancer, on 1 November 1856 in London and was buried at Shipbourne.

== Bibliography ==
- [Anon.] The Jurist, new ser., 2/2 (1856), p. 458
- [Anon.] Law Times, 8 Nov 1856, pp. 85–6
- [Anon.] (1856-7) Law Magazine, new ser. 2, pp. 302–7
- [Anon.] The English Reports, 178 vols. (1900–32) vols. 118–19, pp. 138–9, 148, 169
- Baker, J. H. (2002). An Introduction to Legal History (4th ed.). London: Butterworths. ISBN 0-406-93053-8.
- Freestone, D.; Richardson, J. C. (1980). "The making of English criminal law (7): Sir John Jervis and his acts". Criminal Law Review: 5–16.
- Foss, E. (2006) [1848–64]. A Biographical Dictionary of the Judges of England: From the Conquest to the Present Time 1066-1870. ISBN 1-4286-2959-9. 9.216–18
- Getzler, J. S. (2004) "Jervis, Sir John (1802–1856)", Oxford Dictionary of National Biography, Oxford University Press, Retrieved 4 July 2007 (subscription, Wikipedia Library access or UK public library membership required)
- Goodhart, A. L.; Hanbury, H.G. (1903–72). W. S. Holdsworth, A History of English Law (17 vols. ed.)., vol.15
- Kostal, R. W. (1994). Law and English Railway Capitalism, 1825–1875. ISBN 0-19-825671-X.
- Manchester, A. H. (1984). "Jervis, John". In Simpson, A. W. B. (ed.). Biographical Dictionary of the Common Law. pp. 279–80. ISBN 0-406-51657-X.
- Manson, E. (1904). Builders of our Law during the Reign of Queen Victoria (2nd ed.). pp. 50–57.

Parliament of the United Kingdom
Preceded by John Finchett Maddock; Lord Robert Grosvenor	Member of Parliament for Chester; 1832–1850; With: Lord Robert Grosvenor 1832–1847; Earl Grosvenor 1847–1850	Succeeded by William Owen Stanley; Earl Grosvenor
Legal offices
Preceded by Sir Thomas Wilde	Solicitor General for England and Wales; 7–17 July 1846	Succeeded by Sir John Romilly
Preceded by Sir Thomas Wilde	Attorney General for England and Wales; 1846–1850	Succeeded by Sir John Romilly
Preceded by Sir Thomas Wilde	Chief Justice of the Common Pleas; 1850–1856	Succeeded by Sir Alexander Cockburn
