= Railways Act =

Stock short title used for legislation

Railways Act (with its variations) is a stock short title used in India, Malaysia and the United Kingdom for legislation relating to railways.

== List ==
=== India ===
- The Indian Railways Act 1890
- The Railways Act, 1989

=== Malaysia ===
- The Railways Act 1991
- The Railways (Successor Company) Act 1991

=== United Kingdom ===
- The Railway Regulation Act 1844 (7 & 8 Vict. c. 85)
  - see also Parliamentary train
- The Regulating the Gauge of Railways Act 1846 (9 & 10 Vict. c. 57)
- The Railway Clearing Act 1850 (13 & 14 Vict. c. xxxiii)
- The Railways Act 1873 (36 & 37 Vict. c. 48)
- The Light Railways Act 1896 (59 & 60 Vict. c. 48)
- The Railways Act 1921 (11 & 12 Geo. 5. c. 55)
- The Transport Act 1947 (10 & 11 Geo. 6. c. 49)
- The Railways Act 1993 (c. 43)
- The Railways and Transport Safety Act 2003 (c. 20)
- The Railways Act 2005 (c. 14)
- The Passenger Railway Services (Public Ownership) Act 2024

The Railway and Canal Traffic Acts 1854 to 1894 is the collective title of the following Acts:

- The Railway and Canal Traffic Act 1854 (17 & 18 Vict. c. 31)
- The Regulation of Railways Act 1873 (36 & 37 Vict. c. 48)
- The Board of Trade Arbitrations Act 1874 (37 & 38 Vict. c. 40), Part II
- The Railway and Canal Traffic Act 1888 (51 & 52 Vict. c. 25)
- The Railway and Canal Traffic Act 1892 (55 & 56 Vict. c. 44)
- The Railway and Canal Traffic Act 1894 (57 & 58 Vict. c. 54)

The Railway Regulation Acts 1840 to 1893 is the collective title of the following Acts:

- The Railway Regulation Act 1840 (3 & 4 Vict. c. 97)
- The Railway Regulation Act 1842 (5 & 6 Vict. c. 55)
- The Railway Regulation Act 1844 (7 & 8 Vict. c. 85)
- The Regulation of Railways Act 1868 (31 & 32 Vict. c. 119)
- The Regulation of Railways Act 1871 (34 & 35 Vict. c. 78)
- The Railway Regulation Act (Returns of Signal Arrangements, Working, &c.) 1873 (36 & 37 Vict. c. 76)
- The Regulation of Railways Act 1889 (52 & 53 Vict. c. 57)
- The Railway Regulation Act 1893 (56 & 57 Vict. c. 29)

== See also ==
- List of short titles
- Bills C-1 and S-1
