= Railway Companies' Association =

The Railway Companies' Association (Note: Modern commentators (Bonavia, Harris) drop the apostrophe in the name of this organisation, but Alderman includes it (when not abbreviating it to 'Railway Association'). The Association doesn't seem to have been referred to by its initials 'RCA'.) was a co-ordinating body for British railway companies from 1867 until nationalisation in 1948. Its purpose was to protect the interests of the companies and their shareholders, chiefly against parliamentary interference. It was an early example of a lobby organisation.

== History ==
The association had its roots in a meeting of railway company chairmen, held at the Railway Clearing House (RCH) in March 1854, to discuss parliamentary matters of concern, but a properly constituted organisation developed only slowly. This was partly a result of the independent nature of the Victorian railway companies and the number of company chairmen and senior officers who were Lords or MPs in their own right, and partly a reflection of the gradually increasing role of government in regulating railway company actions and the need for an 'industry' response.

By 1858 a United Railway Companies' Committee (URCC) had been formed, but it foundered after three years and was only re-constituted at a meeting on 26 June 1867, held at the Westminster office of the Midland Railway Company. The revived body's first achievement was to promulgate a standard format for the accounts of railway companies, drawn up by the chief accountants of five of the major companies. This was accepted by the Board of Trade and included as a schedule in the Regulation of Railways Act 1868 (31 & 32 Vict. c. 119).

The URCC was renamed 'The Railway Companies' Association' in 1869 or 1870. Its main task was to follow the progress of legislation which might affect railways, attempting to persuade MPs and Lords to vote in the 'railway interest', and giving evidence to parliamentary committees. It also promoted legislation designed to assist railway companies. This finally left the RCH free of a political role and able to concentrate on the commercial organisation of inter-company services.

Membership of the association received a boost with the arguments over the passing of the Regulation of Railways Act 1873 (36 & 37 Vict. c. 48). The perceived threats to profitability, through regulation of the rates which the 'monopolist' railways could charge, led to several moderately-large companies joining the major ones in the association, finally giving it national coverage.

Chairmanship of the association rotated amongst the chairmen of leading railway companies. Much of the actual lobbying work of the Association devolved onto its parliamentary subcommittee, which consisted of Lords and MPs from the member companies' boards.

The association had a small permanent secretariat, paid for by a precept of one or two shillings per £1,000 of the gross revenue of each participating company. The first secretary of the association was Kenneth Morison, who was also the first secretary of the RCH, but by 1873 the Honorary Secretary was Henry Oakley (knighted 1891), who was secretary and then General Manager (1870–1898) of the Great Northern Railway. He remained in post at the association for the rest of 19th century, and the association's activities were presumably co-ordinated from Oakley's offices at King's Cross.

In the aftermath of the Regulation of Railways Act 1889 (52 & 53 Vict. c. 57) and the industrial unrest of the 1890s, including the North Eastern Railway's unilateral recognition of the new trades union the Amalgamated Society of Railway Servants, the ad-hoc nature of the Association came under increasing pressure, leading to a restructuring. This involved giving the secretariat a permanent base, in three rooms at 53 Parliament Street, leased from October 1900, and appointing a full-time paid secretary, the first being the rising barrister William Guy Granet, appointed in November 1905. Later secretaries included barristers W. Temple Franks (1905–1909) and Arthur Beresford Crane (1909–1929).

The association's role was necessarily reduced during World War I when parliamentary interest in domestic transport matters was low, railways being managed for the war effort under the provisions of the Regulation of the Forces Act 1871, but it gained in importance when the newly established post-war Ministry of Transport decided to deal with the railway companies jointly through the Association. However, because the Railways Act 1921, during passage of which the Association lobbied for better compensation terms for shareholders, grouped British companies into four large concerns, another restructuring of the Association took place. The parliamentary members' council was abolished, severing the direct link with Parliament, and the four new general managers constituted a standing committee of the association. Briefings of independent railway-linked Lords and MPs continued however, for example in the companies' 1938 'Square Deal' campaign for reform of freight rates' legislation in the face of road competition (which was overtaken by the onset of war in 1939) and in the run up to the Transport Act 1947 which nationalised the railways. With all railways then under a single management within the British Transport Commission, the association was wound up at this point.

== Records ==
The minutes of the association were printed and distributed to the member companies, so several sets survive. They are available for consultation in The National Archives, together with other papers relating to the Association, and in the National Archives of Scotland.

== Sources ==
- Alderman, Geoffrey, The railway interest, Leicester, Leicester University Press, 1973, ISBN 0-7185-1111-5
- Bonavia, Michael R., The organisation of British railways, London: Ian Allan, 1971, ISBN 0-7110-0198-7
- Harris, Michael, 'Railway Companies Association' in Simmons, Jack and Biddle, Gordon (eds), The Oxford companion to British Railway history: from 1603 to the 1990s, Oxford, New York: OUP, 1997, ISBN 0-19-211697-5, page 414
