= Ultra vires =

Legal concept meaning powers are exceeded

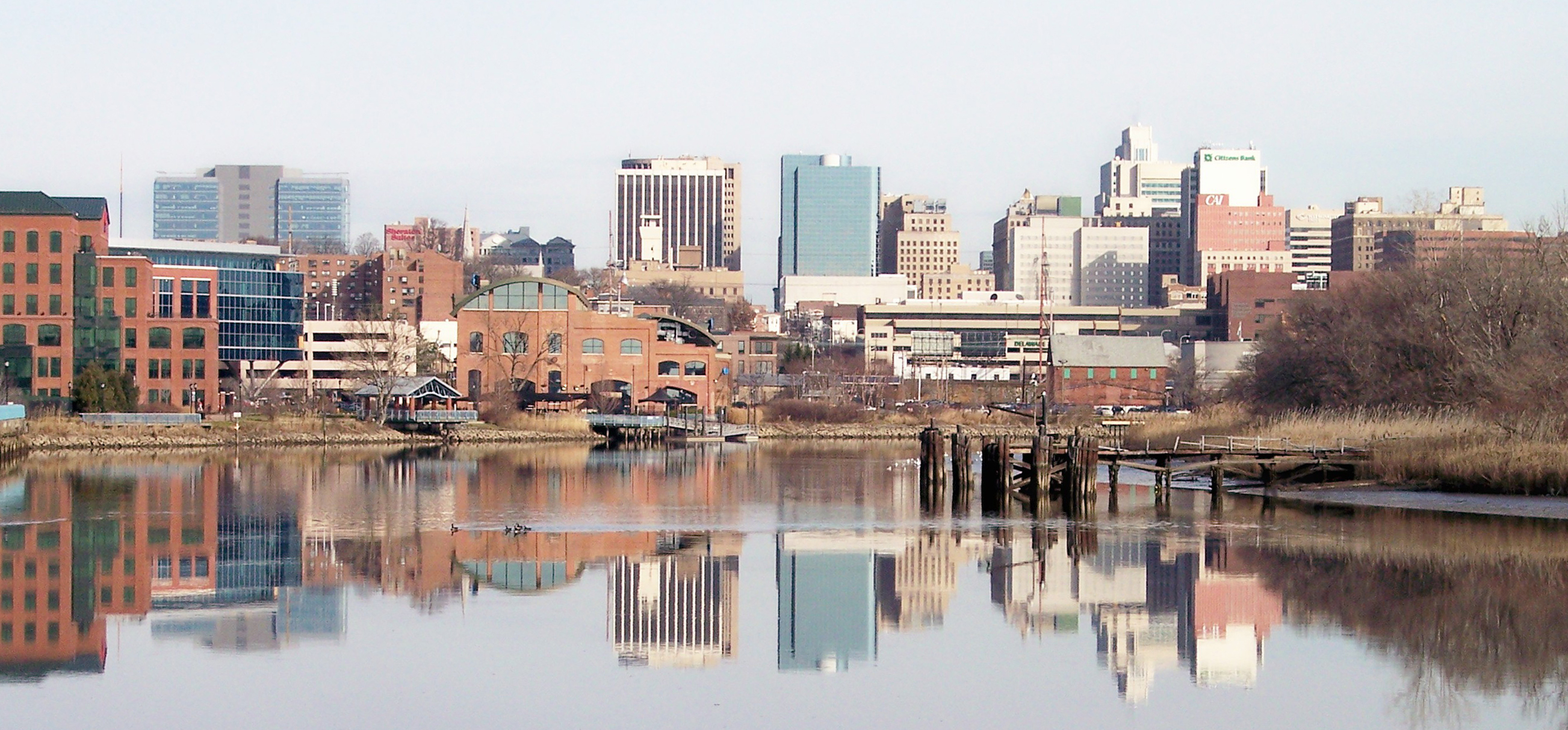
Wilmington, Delaware is the incorporation capital of the United States. Delaware has largely abolished ultra vires in relation to corporations under the Delaware General Corporation Law.

Ultra vires (Note: /ˌʌltrə ˈvaɪriːz/ UL-trə VY-reez, lit. 'beyond the powers') is a Latin phrase used in law to describe an act that requires legal authority but is done without it. Its opposite, an act done under proper authority, is intra vires. (Note: /ˌɪntrə ˈvaɪriːz/ IN-trə VY-reez, lit. 'within the powers') Acts that are intra vires may equivalently be termed "valid", and those that are ultra vires termed "invalid".

Legal issues relating to ultra vires can arise in a variety of contexts:

- Companies and other legal persons sometimes have limited legal capacity to act, and attempts to engage in activities beyond their legal capacities may be ultra vires. Most countries have restricted the doctrine of ultra vires in relation to companies by statute.
- Similarly, statutory and governmental bodies may have limits upon the acts and activities which they legally engage in.
- Subordinate legislation which is purported passed without the proper legal authority may be invalid as beyond the powers of the authority which issued it.

== Corporate law ==
In corporate law, ultra vires describes acts attempted by a corporation that are beyond the scope of powers granted by the corporation's objects clause, its articles of incorporation, its by-laws, similar founding documents, or laws authorizing a corporation's formation. Acts attempted by a corporation that are beyond the scope of its charter are void or voidable.

1. An ultra vires transaction cannot be ratified by shareholders, even if they wish it to be ratified.
2. The doctrine of estoppel usually precluded reliance on the defense of ultra vires where the transaction was fully performed by one party.
3. A fortiori, a transaction fully performed by both parties could not be attacked.
4. If the contract was fully executory, the defense of ultra vires might be raised by either party.
5. If the contract was partially performed, and the performance was held insufficient to bring the doctrine of estoppel into play, a suit for quasi-contract for recovery of benefits conferred was available.
6. If an agent of the corporation committed a tort within the scope of their employment, the corporation could not defend on the ground the act was ultra vires.

Several modern developments relating to corporate formation have limited the probability that ultra vires acts will occur. Except in the case of non-profit corporations (including municipal corporations), this legal doctrine is obsolescent; within recent years, almost all business corporations have been chartered to allow them to transact any lawful business. The doctrine still lives among non-profit corporations or state-created corporate bodies established for a specific public purpose, such as universities or charities.

=== United Kingdom ===
Historically all companies in the United Kingdom were subject to the doctrine of ultra vires and any act which was outside of the objects specified in a company's memorandum of association would be ultra vires and void. That result was commercially unpalatable. It led to companies being formed with extremely wide and generic objects clauses permitting a company to engage in all manner of commercial activities.

The position was changed by statute by the Companies Act 1985, which essentially abolished the doctrine concerning commercial companies. The position is now regulated by the Companies Act 2006, sections 31 and 39, which similarly significantly reduces the applicability of ultra vires in corporate law. However, it can still apply to charities, and a shareholder may apply for an injunction, in advance only, to prevent an act which is claimed to be ultra vires.

=== United States ===
According to American laws, the concept of ultra vires can still arise in the following kinds of activities in some states:

1. Charitable or political contributions
2. Guaranty of indebtedness of another
3. Loans to officers or directors
4. Pensions, bonuses, stock option plans, job severance payments, and other fringe benefits
5. The power to acquire shares of other corporations
6. The power to enter into a partnership

The Model Business Corporation Act, adopted in 36 United States jurisdictions (but not, for example, in the populous or influential states of California, Delaware, New York or Texas) is based on an American Bar Association panel's recommendation, and states: "The validity of corporate action may not be challenged on the ground that the corporation lacks or lacked power to act."

=== Other jurisdictions ===
In many jurisdictions, such as Australia, legislation provides that a corporation has all the powers of a natural person plus others; also, the validity of acts which are made ultra vires is preserved.

== Constitutional law ==
Under constitutional law, particularly in Canada and the United States, constitutions give federal and provincial or state governments various powers. To go outside those powers would be ultra vires; for example, although the court did not use the term in striking down a federal law in United States v. Lopez because it exceeded the constitutional authority of Congress, the Supreme Court still declared the law to be ultra vires.

According to Article 15.2 of the Irish constitution, the Oireachtas (parliament) is the sole lawmaking body in the Republic of Ireland. In the case of CityView Press v AnCo, however, the Supreme Court of Ireland held that the Oireachtas may delegate certain powers to subordinate bodies through primary legislation, so long as these delegated powers allow the delegatee only to further the principles and policies laid down by the Oireachtas in primary legislation and not craft new principles or policies themselves. Any piece of primary legislation that grants the power to make public policy to a body other than the Oireachtas is unconstitutional; however, as there is a presumption in Irish constitutional law that the Oireachtas acts within the confines of the constitution, any legislation passed by the Oireachtas must be interpreted in such a way as to be constitutionally valid where possible.

Thus, in several cases where bodies other than the Oireachtas were found to have used powers granted to them by primary legislation to make public policy, the impugned primary legislation was read in such a way that it would not have the effect of allowing a subordinate body to make public policy. In these cases, the primary legislation was held to be constitutional. Still, the subordinate or secondary legislation, which amounted to creating public policy, was held to be ultra vires the primary legislation and was struck down.

In UK constitutional law, ultra vires describes patents, ordinances, and the like enacted under the prerogative powers of the Crown that contradict statutes enacted by the Crown-in-Parliament. Almost unheard of in modern times, ultra vires acts by the Crown or its servants were previously a major threat to the rule of law.

Boddington v British Transport Police is an example of an appeal heard by the House of Lords that contested that a by-law was beyond the powers conferred to it under section 67 of the Transport Act 1962.

== Administrative law ==
In administrative law, an act may be judicially reviewable for ultra vires in a narrow or broad sense. Narrow ultra vires applies if an administrator did not have the substantive power to make a decision or it was wrought with procedural defects. Broad ultra vires applies if there is an abuse of power (e.g., Wednesbury unreasonableness or bad faith) or a failure to exercise an administrative discretion (e.g., acting at the behest of another or unlawfully applying a government policy) or application of discretionary powers in an irrational and wrong way. Either doctrine may entitle a claimant to various prerogative writs, equitable remedies or statutory orders if they are satisfied.

=== United Kingdom ===
In the seminal case of Anisminic v Foreign Compensation Commission, Lord Reid is credited with formulating the doctrine of ultra vires. However, ultra vires, together with unreasonableness, was mentioned much earlier by Lord Russell in the well-known case, Kruse v Johnson, regarding challenging by-laws and other rules. Anisminic is better known for not depriving courts of their jurisdiction to declare a decision a nullity, even if a statute expressly prevents it from being subject to judicial review. Further cases such as Bromley LBC v Greater London Council and Council of Civil Service Unions v Minister for the Civil Service have sought to refine the doctrine.

In Hammersmith and Fulham London Borough Council v Hazell, the House of Lords held that interest rate swaps entered into by local authorities (a popular method of circumventing statutory restrictions on local authorities borrowing money at that time) were all ultra vires and void, sparking a raft of satellite litigation.

Mark Elliott (St Catharine's College, Cambridge) proposes a modified ultra vires doctrine for administrative law, placing it firmly in the correct constitutional setting.

== See also ==
- Judicial activism
- Judicial Review in English Law
- Precedent
