= Railway Clearing House =

Defunct regulatory body overseeing the day-to-day running of railways in Great Britain

Coordinates: 51.5315°N 0.1357°W

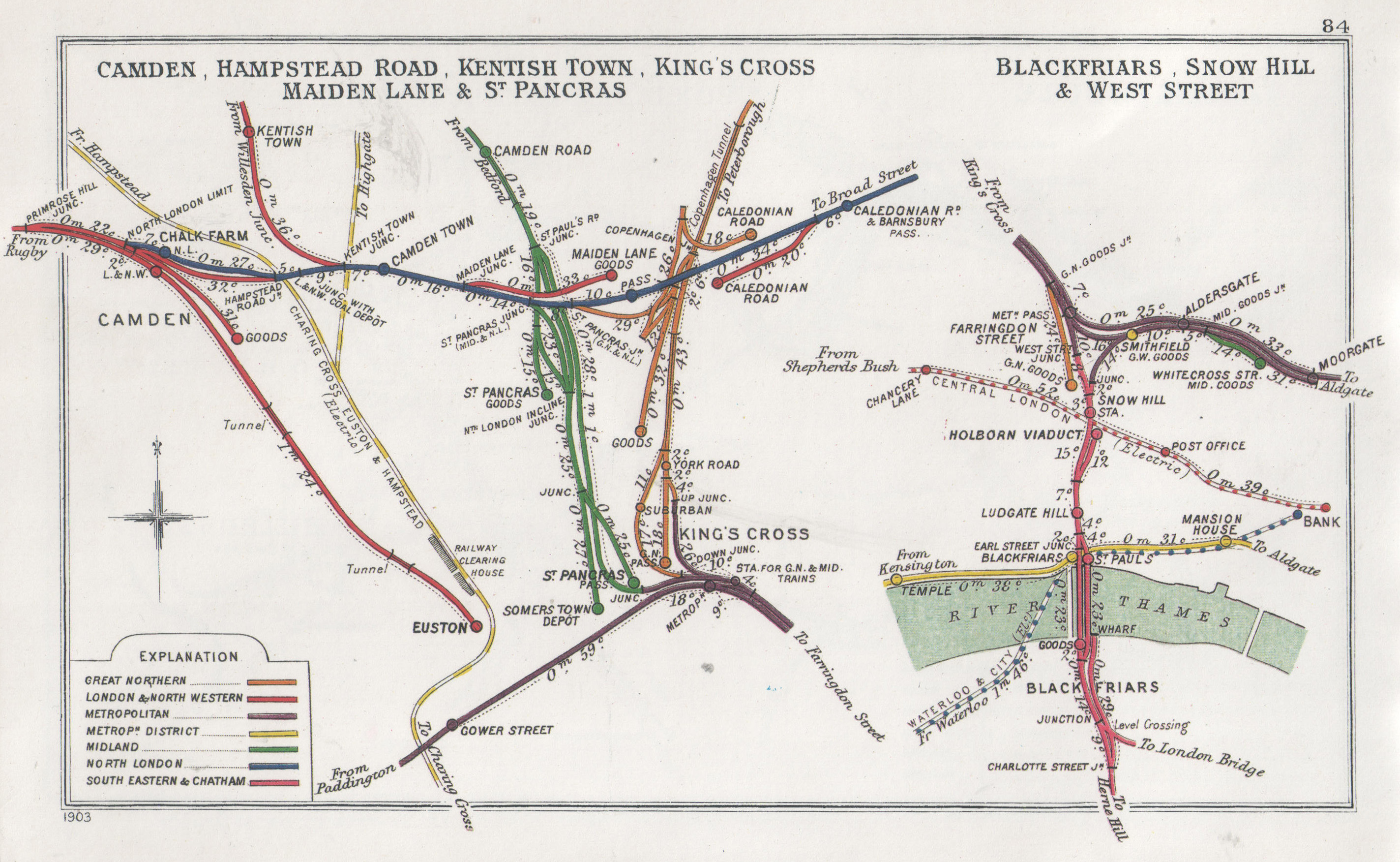
- Typical railway junction diagram produced by the RCH, showing here the location of their offices close to Euston Station
- Abbreviation: RCH
- Formation: 2 January 1842
- Dissolved: 8 April 1955 (Note: Although the RCH lost its legal standing as an independent body on this date by being absorbed into the British Transport Commission, it continued to perform certain functions under the same name until 31 March 1963.)
- Purpose: Distribution of railway receipts; common standards for railways
- Location: London
- Region served: United Kingdom
- Members: Railway companies

The Railway Clearing House (RCH) was an organisation set up to manage the allocation of revenue collected by pre-grouping railway companies for the conveyance of passengers and goods over the lines (or using the rolling stock) of other companies. It went on to become the major regulatory body overseeing the day-to-day running of railways in Great Britain and setting common standards for railway companies, which ensured their safety and interoperability. The RCH also produced fare structures governing many aspects of rail transport at a national level and set limits on price increases for passenger travel.

== Rationale ==
When passengers travelled between two stations on the same railway, using trains provided by the same company, that company was entitled to the whole of the fare. Similarly, when goods were consigned between two stations on the same railway, using wagons provided by the same company, that company was entitled to the whole of the fee. However, when coaches or wagons owned by a different company were used, that company would be entitled to a proportion of the fare or fee. If the commencement and terminus of the journey were on different railways, a more complicated situation arose: if the two companies involved did not provide through ticketing, the passenger or goods needed to be re-booked at a junction station; if through booking was provided, the receipts collected by the first company needed to be divided between them, usually on a mileage basis. The Railway Clearing House was founded as a means by which these receipts could be apportioned fairly.

== History ==
=== 19th century ===
The Railway Clearing House commenced operations on 2 January 1842 in small offices at 111 Drummond Street opposite Euston Station, London. The premises were owned by the London and Birmingham Railway, which also provided the initial costs of setting up the organisation.

The founding members, whose first meeting was on 26 April 1842, were: the London and Birmingham Railway; the predecessors of the Midland Railway (the Midland Counties Railway, Birmingham and Derby Junction Railway, and North Midland Railway); the Manchester and Leeds Railway; and the predecessors of the North Eastern Railway (the Leeds and Selby Railway, Hull and Selby Railway, York and North Midland Railway and Great North of England Railway).

This first meeting agreed to principles by which the ongoing activities of the RCH were to be funded. This involved a fixed payment per station served (£5, reduced in 1844 to £2 for stations that were not termini) plus an apportionment of the balance of costs according to the total share of receipts of each participating company. The first manager was Kenneth Morrison, auditor of the London and Birmingham Railway.

By the end of December 1845, more companies had joined: the Birmingham and Gloucester Railway; Chester and Birmingham Railway; the Grand Junction Railway and its allies the North Union Railway and Liverpool and Manchester Railway; the Lancaster and Preston Railway; Manchester and Birmingham Railway; and Newcastle and Carlisle Railway.

The Grand Junction Railway initially refused, because of the £300 per year cost of using Edmondson tickets, and the Liverpool and Manchester saw no need to join, being isolated from the rest of the railway system.

Owing to expansion, the RCH moved to larger purpose-built premises in Seymour Street (renamed Eversholt Street in 1938) in early 1849, which remained its headquarters for the rest of its existence. By the end of 1850 a further 21 companies had joined, including several of the leading Scottish companies, bringing the total of British railway mileage in the scheme to 55.8%. However, it still lacked the Great Western Railway and the companies south of London. In January 1863 a pneumatic tube, one-third of a mile long, was installed between the RCH and the NW Postal District Office so that "parcels or persons are blown from one end to the other in a little over a minute".

It was soon realised that the RCH provided a neutral meeting point where different railways could discuss points of disagreement and make suggestions which could benefit other railways. Besides meeting rooms, the RCH provided secretarial facilities for these discussions. Conferences between railway managers were arranged, as were conferences between the different railways' departmental heads. In this way, railways moved towards many common practices, without the need for legislation. The system had a weakness, in that a unanimous vote was required for a recommendation to become compulsory. Another function of the Railway Clearing House was to deal with lost property found in railway carriages.

Railway Clearing Act 1850
- Act of Parliament
- Parliament of the United Kingdom
- Long title: An Act for regulating legal Proceedings by or against the Committee of Railway Companies associated under the Railway Clearing System, and for other Purposes.
- Citation: 13 & 14 Vict. c. xxxiii

Dates
- Royal assent: 25 June 1850

Other legislation
- Repealed by: Railway Clearing House Scheme Order 1954

Status: Repealed

Text of statute as originally enacted

Railway Clearing House Extension Act 1874
- Act of Parliament
- Parliament of the United Kingdom
- Long title: An Act for enabling the Railway Clearing Committee to purchase land by compulsion, and to build thereon for the purposes of the Clearing System, to defray the expenses thereof as part of the expenses of the Clearing System, and by borrowing money; and for other purposes.
- Citation: 37 & 38 Vict. c. xvi

Dates
- Royal assent: 8 June 1874

Other legislation
- Repealed by: Railway Clearing House Scheme Order 1954

Status: Repealed

Text of statute as originally enacted

In due course, the RCH was given legal status by a local act of Parliament, the Railway Clearing Act 1850 (13 & 14 Vict. c. xxxiii). Although initiated by the members' companies themselves, the bill, in fact, reduced the scope of the RCH, while making it easier to enforce debt collection among members (hitherto not formally regulated). A later attempt, in 1859, via Parliament, to re-extend the powers and potential membership of the RCH, foundered on conflicting interests.

A separate organisation, the United Railway Companies' Committee, was formed in 1858 but folded in 1861. It was re-established in June 1867 and became the Railway Companies' Association (RCA) in 1869. There was a certain degree of overlap between the RCA and the RCH, and it was later agreed that the RCA should represent the railways in Parliament, whilst the RCH concentrated on organising the business of railway traffic.

Railway Clearing Committee Incorporation Act 1897
- Act of Parliament
- Parliament of the United Kingdom
- Long title: An Act to incorporate the Committee of Railway Companies associated under the Railway Clearing System and to enlarge the powers vested in that Committee, and for other purposes.
- Citation: 60 & 61 Vict. c. cxvi

Dates
- Royal assent: 3 June 1897

Other legislation
- Repealed by: Railway Clearing House Scheme Order 1954

Status: Repealed

Text of statute as originally enacted

The RCH was established as a body corporate by the Railway Clearing Committee Incorporation Act 1897 (60 & 61 Vict. c. cxvi).

=== 20th century ===
During both World Wars, the railways were placed under government control, and the receipts were pooled and then apportioned in fixed proportions according to pre-war receipts. During those periods, the duties of the RCH were very much reduced, but they continued to provide their secretarial functions.

As railway companies amalgamated, so the number of members reduced, until it had just one member, the British Transport Commission (BTC).

Railway Clearing House Scheme Order 1954
- Statutory Instrument
- Parliament of the United Kingdom
- Citation: SI 1954/139

Dates
- Made: 4 February 1954
- Commencement: 4 February 1954

Other legislation
- Repeals/revokes: Railway Clearing Act 1850; Railway Clearing House Extension Act 1874; Railway Clearing Committee Incorporation Act 1897
- Made under: Transport Act 1947

Text of statute as originally enacted

Most of the remaining powers, property, rights and liabilities of the RCH were transferred to the BTC on 24 May 1954, and the RCH was dissolved as a corporate body on 8 April 1955. The BTC then continued the remaining functions of the RCH, still under the name Railway Clearing House. They included the provision of secretarial services and rooms for railway meetings, and meetings between road and rail companies; classification of goods for the setting of rates; the examination and certification of new packaging materials; the registration of rolling stock; the issue of maps and other publications including scales of charges; and the spot-check of wagons and consignments in transit. By 31 December 1959, the number of staff employed by the RCH had fallen from about 3,200 in 1921, to just 375.

The RCH was finally disbanded on 31 March 1963, when the British Railways Board (BRB) took over its surviving duties. Along with all RCH staff, they were divided mainly between the department of the board's chief commercial officer and that of its chief accountant.

== Standards ==
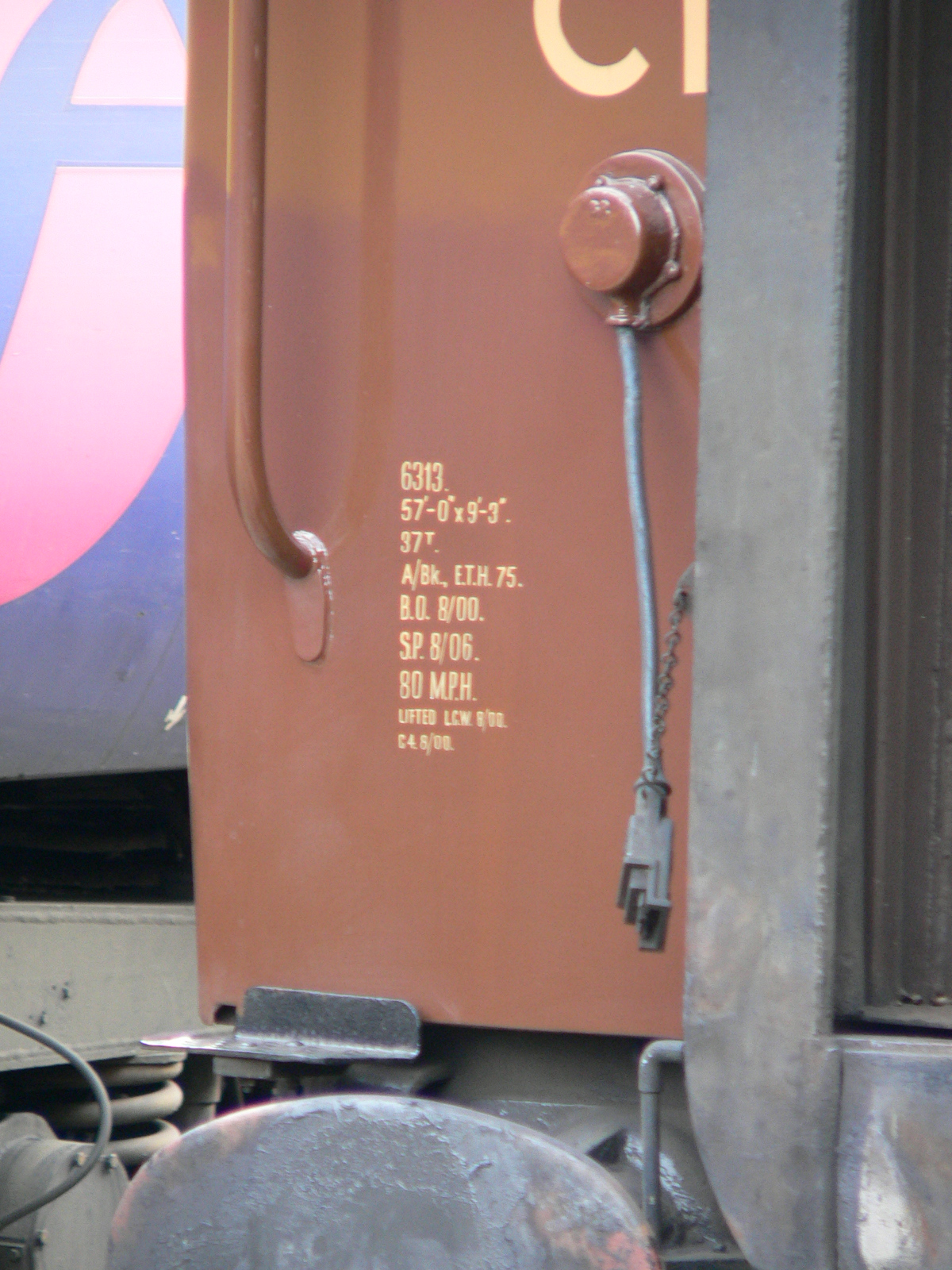
The RCH jumper cable of a British Railways Mark 1 coach

On 22 September 1847, the RCH recommended that Greenwich Mean Time be adopted as the standard time for all railways in the United Kingdom.

The RCH went on to set technical standards for various items, such as goods wagons, to promote standardisation across the rail network. If a wagon was described as an RCH wagon, this meant it had been built to comply with RCH standards.

The RCH set technical standards for cable connections between coaches for the remote operation of systems; they were initially used only for control of train lighting. These cables were known as RCH jumpers, and in the 1970s a system for push-pull trains was developed which used the RCH cable, eliminating the need for a separate control cable to be fitted to intermediate coaches.

The RCH produced Railway Junction Diagrams (RJDs), which show the junctions where two or more railway companies met, and the distances between these junctions and nearby stations and junctions, in order to aid the calculation of mileage-based rates. The first railway map by the RCH was made by Zachary Macaulay in 1851. He died in 1860, and the work was continued by John Airey. Both men were clerks in the RCH office. Airey was allowed to publish the maps on his own account, and issued six editions of the RJDs between 1867 and 1894. The RCH took over his business in 1895, and continued to publish the diagrams until 1928. Starting in 1859 Airey and the RCH issued what has been described as the "most superb series of railway maps ever produced in the United Kingdom."

The RCH had some similarities to the modern Association of Train Operating Companies, and in particular, its Rail Settlement Plan division.

== Gallery ==
Airey Railway Map of Lancashire & District, 1875

Airey Railway Map of England & Wales, 1881

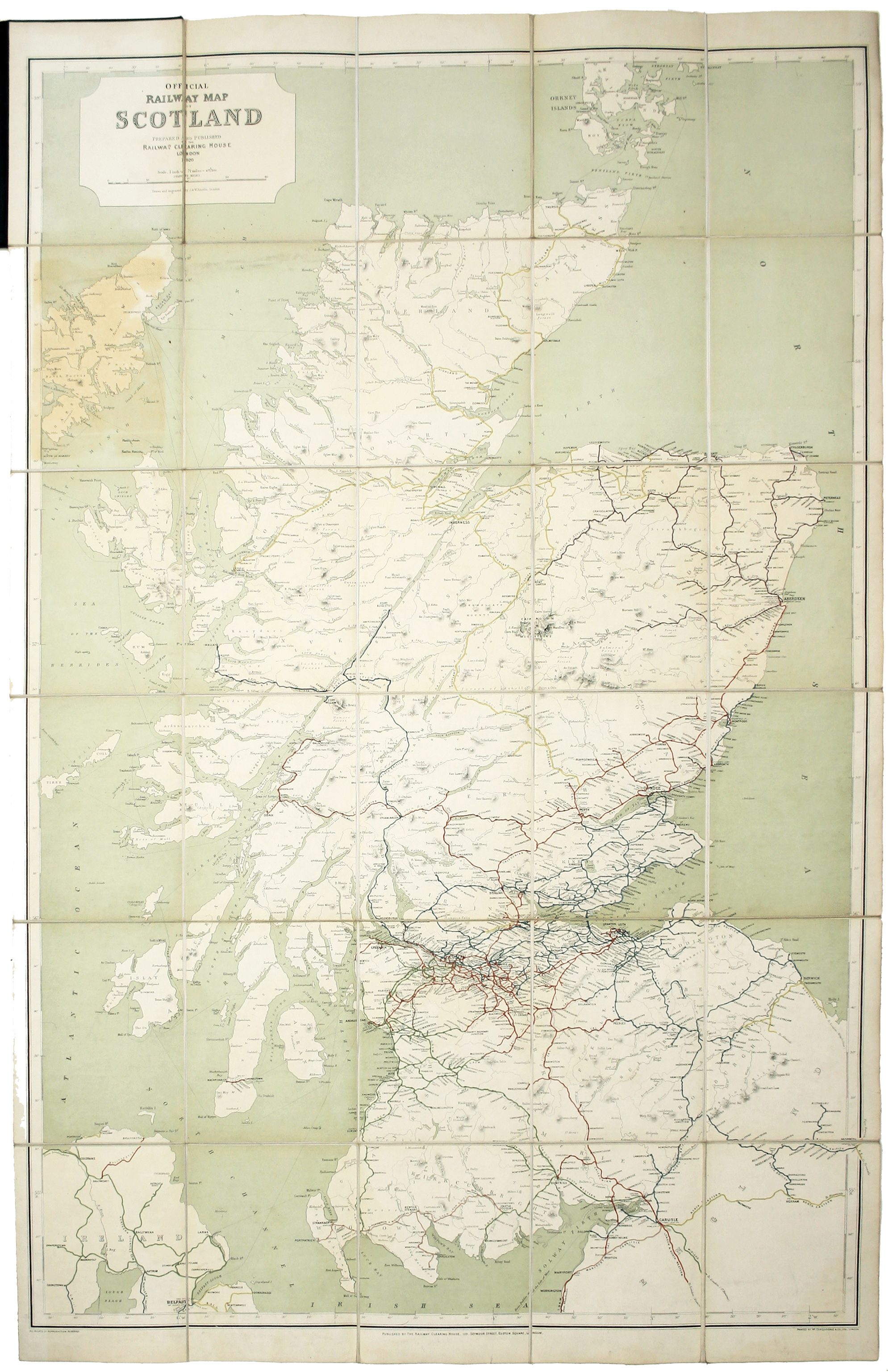
Railway Clearing House map of Scotland, 1920

== Bibliography ==
- Bagwell, Philip (1968). The Railway Clearing House in the British Economy, 1842-1922. London: Allen & Unwin. ISBN 0043310370.
- Bonavia, Michael R. (1971). The Organisation of British Railways. Shepperton: Ian Allan. ISBN 0711001987.
