= Post Office Act 1953 =

Act of the Parliament of the United Kingdom

Post Office Act 1953 (Note: Section 92(1).)
- Act of Parliament
- Parliament of the United Kingdom
- Long title: An Act to consolidate certain enactments relating to the Post Office with corrections and improvements made under the Consolidation of Enactments (Procedure) Act, 1949.
- Citation: 1 & 2 Eliz. 2. c. 36
- Territorial extent: United Kingdom (Note: Section 88.)

Dates
- Royal assent: 31 July 1953
- Commencement: 31 August 1953 (Note: Section 92(2).)
- Repealed: 26 March 2001
Other legislation
Amends	See § Repealed enactments
Repeals/revokes	See § Repealed enactments
Amended by	Road Traffic Act 1960; Road Traffic Act 1960; Statute Law Revision Act 1960; Post Office Act 1961; Transport Act 1962; Criminal Justice Act 1967; Theft Act 1968; Transport (London) Act 1969; Post Office Act 1969; Theft Act (Northern Ireland) 1969; Postal Services (Channel Islands Consequential Provisions) Order 1969; Criminal Damage Act 1971; Local Government Act 1972; Northern Ireland Constitution Act 1973; Local Government (Scotland) Act 1973; Postal Services (Isle of Man Consequential Provisions) Order 1973; Northern Ireland (Modification of Enactments—No. 1) Order 1973; Statute Law (Repeals) Act 1974; Criminal Procedure (Scotland) Act 1975; Criminal Law Act 1977; Criminal Damage (Northern Ireland) Order 1977; Customs and Excise Management Act 1979; British Telecommunications Act 1981; Forgery and Counterfeiting Act 1981; Criminal Justice Act 1982; London Regional Transport Act 1984; Fines and Penalties (Northern Ireland) Order 1984; Interception of Communications Act 1985; Finance Act 1987; Railways Act 1993; Statute Law (Repeals) Act 1993; Post Office (Abolition of Import Restrictions) Regulations 1993; Local Government etc. (Scotland) Act 1994; Scotland Act 1998 (Transfer of Functions to the Scottish Ministers etc.) Order 1999; Regulation of Investigatory Powers Act 2000
Repealed by	Postal Services Act 2000

Status: Repealed

Text of statute as originally enacted

Revised text of statute as amended

The Post Office Act 1953 (1 & 2 Eliz. 2. c. 36) was an act of the Parliament of the United Kingdom that consolidated enactments relating to the Post Office in the United Kingdom.

== Provisions ==
=== Repealed enactments ===
Section 91(1) of the act repealed 19 enactments, listed in the third schedule to the act.

Citation	Short title	Extent of repeal
1 & 2 Vict. c. 98	Railways (Conveyance of Mails) Act 1838	The whole act.
7 & 8 Vict. c. 85	Railway Regulation Act 1844	Section eleven.
10 & 11 Vict. c. 85	Post Office (Duties) Act 1847	The whole act.
31 & 32 Vict. c. 119	Regulation of Railways Act 1868	Sections thirty-six and thirty-seven.
36 & 37 Vict. c. 48	Regulation of Railways Act 1873	Sections eighteen to twenty.
45 & 46 Vict. c. 74	Post Office (Parcels) Act 1882	The whole act.
54 & 55 Vict. c. 38	Stamp Duties Management Act 1891	Section seven.
56 & 57 Vict. c. 38	Conveyance of Mails Act 1893	The whole act.
61 & 62 Vict. c. 46	Revenue Act 1898	Paragraph (i) of section one.
8 Edw. 7. c. 48	Post Office Act 1908	The whole act.
3 & 4 Geo. 5. c. 11	Post Office Act 1913	The whole act.
10 & 11 Geo. 5. c. 40	Post Office and Telegraph Act 1920	The whole act.
12 & 13 Geo. 5. c. 17	Finance Act 1922	Section forty-eight.
12 & 13 Geo. 5. c. 49	Post Office (Parcels) Act 1922	The whole act.
16 & 17 Geo. 5. c. 9	Economy (Miscellaneous Provisions) Act 1926	Section seventeen.
20 & 21 Geo. 5. c. 43	Road Traffic Act 1930	Section one hundred and four, subsection (3).
25 & 26 Geo. 5. c. 15	Post Office (Amendment) Act 1935	The whole act.
10 & 11 Geo. 6. c. 49	Transport Act 1947	Section sixty-five, subsection (2).
15 & 16 Geo. 6. & 1 Eliz. 2. c. 36	Post Office (Amendment) Act 1952	The whole act.

== Subsequent developments ==
Sections 3 and 4 of the act were repealed by section 89(1) of, and part I of schedule 6 to, the British Telecommunications Act 1981, which came into force on 27 July 1981.

Section 91(1) of, and schedule 3 to, the act were repealed by section 1 of, and part XI of the schedule to, the Statute Law (Repeals) Act 1974, which came into force on 27 June 1974.

The whole act was repealed by section 127(6) of, and schedule 9 to, the Postal Services Act 2000, which came into force on 26 March 2001.
