= Railway and Canal Commission =

Abolished British court of record

Railway and Canal Traffic Act 1888 (Note: Section 1.)
- Act of Parliament
- Parliament of the United Kingdom
- Long title: An Act for the better regulation of Railway and Canal Traffic, and for other purposes.
- Citation: 51 & 52 Vict. c. 25
- Territorial extent: United Kingdom

Dates
- Royal assent: 10 August 1888
- Commencement: 1 January 1889 (Note: Section 56.)
Other legislation
Amends	Railway and Canal Traffic Act 1854; Regulation of Railways Act 1873
Amended by	Railway and Canal Traffic Act 1892; Statute Law Revision Act 1908; Ministry of Health Act 1919; Railways Act 1921; Supreme Court of Judicature (Consolidation) Act 1925; Petroleum Consolidation Act 1928; Transport Act 1947; Railway and Canal Commission (Abolition) Act 1949; Statute Law Revision Act 1959; Highways Act 1959; Statute Law Revision Act 1960; Transport Act 1962; London Government Act 1963; Transport Act 1968; Local Government Act 1972; Roads (Scotland) Act 1984; Statute Law (Repeals) Act 1986; Statute Law (Repeals) Act 1989; Local Government and Housing Act 1989

Status: Amended

Text of statute as originally enacted

Revised text of statute as amended

Text of the Railway and Canal Traffic Act 1888 as in force today (including any amendments) within the United Kingdom, from legislation.gov.uk.

Railway and Canal Commission (Abolition) Act 1949 (Note: Section 8(1).)
- Act of Parliament
- Parliament of the United Kingdom
- Long title: An Act to abolish the Railway and Canal Commission and make provision for the future exercise and performance of their functions; to amend and repeal certain enactments relating to their functions; and for purposes connected with the matters aforesaid.
- Citation: 12, 13 & 14 Geo. 6. c. 11
- Territorial extent: United Kingdom

Dates
- Royal assent: 9 March 1949
- Commencement: 1 April 1949 (Note: The Railway and Canal Commission (Abolition) Act 1949 (Commencement) Order 1949 (SI 1949/603).)
Other legislation
Amends	Railway and Canal Traffic Act 1854; Regulation of Railways Act 1873; Telegraph Act 1878; Railway and Canal Traffic Act 1888; Regulation of Railways Act 1889; Railway Regulation Act 1893; Conveyance of Mails Act 1893; Railway and Canal Traffic Act 1894; Metropolis Water Act 1897; Railway Employment (Prevention of Accidents) Act 1900; Railways (Private Sidings) Act 1904; Telegraph (Construction) Act 1908; Telegraph (Arbitration) Act 1909; Telegraph (Construction) Act 1911; Telegraph (Construction) Act 1916; Defence of the Realm (Acquisition of Land) Act 1916; Electricity (Supply) Act 1919; Mines (Working Facilities and Support) Act 1923; Mines (Working Facilities and Support) Act 1925; Mining Industry Act 1926; Doncaster Area Drainage Act 1929
Amended by	Statute Law Revision Act 1953; Statute Law (Repeals) Act 1978; Telecommunications Act 1984

Status: Amended

Text of statute as originally enacted

Revised text of statute as amended

Text of the Railway and Canal Commission (Abolition) Act 1949 as in force today (including any amendments) within the United Kingdom, from legislation.gov.uk.

The Railway and Canal Commission was a British court of record, established by the Railway and Canal Traffic Act 1888 (51 & 52 Vict. c. 25) and abolished by the Railway and Canal Commission (Abolition) Act 1949 (12, 13 & 14 Geo. 6. c. 11).

The Regulation of Railways Act 1873 (36 & 37 Vict. c. 48) established the Railway Commissioners, created to carry into effect the provisions of the Railway and Canal Traffic Act 1854 (17 & 18 Vict. c. 31). When the 1873 act expired, Parliament established the Railway and Canal Commission in 1888. It originally consisted of five commissioners.

The jurisdiction of the commission having been progressively whittled down, it was abolished in 1949. Its last member, Sir Francis Taylor, was elevated to the peerage as Baron Maenan shortly before its abolition.
