= Woodman v Photo Trade Processing Ltd =

- Court: Exeter County Court
- Citations: (1981) (Unreported, Exeter County Court), Lawson (1981) 131 NLJ 933, 935

Keywords
- Unfair terms

Woodman v Photo Trade Processing Ltd (1981) 131 NLJ 933 is an English contract law case concerning unfair contract terms.

== Facts ==
A photograph developing shop, Photo Trade Processing Ltd, lost some snaps from a wedding. Its standard contract clause excluded liability for damages which exceeded the cost of the material itself.

== Judgment ==
Clarke J held that the photo shop was liable to Woodman for the loss of the photographs, because other alternative sources of supply were not shown to be available nearby and the photo shop had not offered a service without the exclusion clause under the Unfair Contract Terms Act 1977 sections 2(2) or 3. Other ways that the customer's needs could be met were still relevant for this service contract through the reasonableness test under Schedule 2, even though its listing in Schedule 2 on the Act's strict wording, are only relevant for supply of goods (sections 6 and 7). The Code of Practice agreed between the OFT and the Photographic Industry envisaged a two tiered service. And because the defendants did not provide a two-tiered service, one low risk higher fee and one high risk lower fee, they had not discharged their burden to persuade him the clause was reasonable.

In the course of his judgment he referred to Peek v North Staffordshire Rly Co where under the Railway and Canal Traffic Act 1854 liability exclusion clauses were permitted that were ‘just and reasonable’. The clause excluded liability for loss to fragile goods unless they were declared insured according to value. Six to five, the Lords ruled that the clause was invalid because liability for mistake as well as negligence was excluded, the railway had a monopoly so customers had only the company's terms, and only ‘exorbitant’ insurance was available.

== See also ==
- English contract law
