= Boddington v British Transport Police =

- Court: House of Lords
- Full case name: Boddington v British Transport Police
- Decided: 2 April 1998
- Citations: [1998] UKHL 13; [1999] 2 AC 143; [1998] 2 All ER 203; [1998] 2 WLR 639

Case history
- Appealed from: Divisional court

Court membership
- Judges sitting: Lord Irvine; Lord Browne-Wilkinson; Lord Slynn; Lord Steyn; Lord Hoffmann

Keywords
- Administrative law; Judicial review; Ultra vires

Boddington v British Transport Police [1998] UKHL 13 is an important case in English administrative law which established the possibility of a "collateral challenge" to an allegedly unlawful administrative action.

== Facts ==
Mr Boddington was caught smoking in a railway carriage where smoking was prohibited. He was convicted and fined by a magistrate under a by-law made under the Transport Act 1962.

== Judgment ==
On appeal, the question was whether Mr Boddington was entitled to raise, as a defence, the invalidity of the by-law under which he had been convicted. The difficulty was that the normal path for having an administrative action declared unlawful and invalid is an application for judicial review – which Mr Boddington had not brought.

The House of Lords held unanimously that he was entitled to bring a so-called collateral challenge in the criminal proceedings. Lord Irvine, then Lord Chancellor, and Lord Steyn gave the leading speeches. On the facts, however, Mr Boddington's challenge failed, and his appeal against conviction was dismissed.

== Legacy ==
Collateral challenges are an important means, alternative to an application for judicial review, of attacking the validity of an administrative action. Although collateral challenges had been permitted in English law before Boddington, the case is notable for strongly asserting their continuing relevance in modern law and rooting them in liberal values.

Boddington was adopted into South African law by the Supreme Court of Appeal in Oudekraal Estates (Pty) Ltd v City of Cape Town and Others.
