= Statute Law Revision Act 1960 =

Act of the Parliament of the United Kingdom

Statute Law Revision Act 1960 (Note: Section 3.)
- Act of Parliament
- Parliament of the United Kingdom
- Long title: An Act to revise the statute law by repealing obsolete, spent or unnecessary enactments.
- Citation: 8 & 9 Eliz. 2. c. 56
- Territorial extent: United Kingdom (Note: Section 2.)

Dates
- Royal assent: 29 July 1960
- Commencement: 29 July 1960 (Note: The Acts of Parliament (Commencement) Act 1793.)
Other legislation
Repeals/revokes	Cheap Trains and Canal Carriers Act 1858; Railway Companies' Powers Act 1864; Railways Construction Facilities Act 1864; Railway Returns (Continuous Brakes) Act 1878; Railway Regulation Act 1893
Amended by	Northern Ireland Constitution Act 1973; Statute Law (Repeals) Act 1974

Status: Amended

Text of statute as originally enacted

The Statute Law Revision Act 1960 (8 & 9 Eliz. 2. c. 56) is an act of the Parliament of the United Kingdom.

As of 2010, the act remained partly in force in the United Kingdom.

== Provisions ==
=== Repealed enactments ===
Section 1(1) of the act repealed 41 enactments, listed in the schedule to the act.

Citation	Short title	Extent of repeal
Road and Rail Transport Enactments
7 & 8 Vict. c. 85	Railway Regulation Act 1844	Sections two to ten and twelve.
8 & 9 Vict. c. 20	Railways Clauses Consolidation Act 1845	Sections twenty-five to twenty-nine. Sections sixty-three and sixty-four.
21 & 22 Vict. c. 75	Cheap Trains and Canal Carriers Act 1858	The whole act.
27 & 28 Vict. c. 120	Railway Companies' Powers Act 1864	The whole act.
27 & 28 Vict. c. 121	Railways Construction Facilities Act 1864	The whole act.
31 & 32 Vict. c. 119	Regulation of Railways Act 1868	Section thirty-eight.
34 & 35 Vict. c. 78	Regulation of Railways Act 1871	Sections nine and ten. Schedule One.
36 & 37 Vict. c. 48	Regulation of Railways Act 1873	In section six, the words " or of section sixteen of the Regulation of Railways Act, 1868 ". Sections fifteen and sixteen.
36 & 37 Vict. c. 76	Railway Regulation Act (Returns of Signal Arrangements, Working, &c.) 1873	Section four and the Schedules.
41 & 42 Vict. c. 20	Railway Returns (Continuous Brakes) Act 1878	The whole act.
51 & 52 Vict. c. 25	Railway and Canal Traffic Act 1888	Sections thirty-two and forty-two.
56 & 57 Vict. c. 29	Railway Regulation Act 1893	The whole act.
59 & 60 Vict. c. 48	Light Railways Act 1896	In section eleven, paragraph (j). In the Second Schedule, the entries relating to the Railway Regulation (Gauge) Act, 1846, the Regulation of Railways Act, 1871, and the Railway Returns (Continuous Brakes) Act, 1878, in the entry relating to the Railway Regulation Act, 1842, the words " four, five, six ", in the entry relating to the Regulation of Railways Act, 1868, the word " twenty ", and in the entry relating to the Railway Regulation Act (Returns of Signal Arrangements, Workings, &c.), 1873, the words " four and ".
1 & 2 Geo. 5. c. 34	Railway Companies (Accounts and Returns) Act 1911	Section five.
9 & 10 Geo. 5. c. 50	Ministry of Transport Act 1919	Sections eight, nine, ten and fourteen.
11 & 12 Geo. 5. c. 55	Railways Act 1921	Sections one, two and four. In section seven, subsection (4). Sections eight and fifteen. The Second Schedule.
23 & 24 Geo. 5. c. 14	London Passenger Transport Act 1933	In section five, in subsection (2), the words " (subject to the provisions of section eighty-two of this Act) ". Sections six to fourteen. In section sixteen, in subsection (1), the words " after the appointed day ", and subsections (3) to (6). In section seventeen, subsection (1), in subsection (2), the words " after the appointed day ", and subsection (5). In section twenty, in subsection (1), the words " Subject to the provisions of this section ", and subsection (2). In section twenty-five, subsections (2) and (3). Sections thirty-two to thirty-five. Part III. In section seventy-three, subsection (5), in subsection (7) the words from the beginning to " diminished, or ", and subsections (8), (10) and (12). In section seventy-four the words " and (12) ". In section eighty-one, in subsection (1), paragraphs (a) to (h) and the words from " nor shall " onwards, and subsection (2). Sections eighty-two to eighty-four. In section eighty-five, subsection (1), and in paragraph (a) of the proviso to subsection (2) the words " or section eighty-two ". Section eighty-seven. Sections ninety and ninety-one. Sections ninety-four to ninety-six. Section ninety-nine. In section one hundred and seven, in subsection (2), the words from the beginning to " this Act, and " and the words from " and the expressions " to the end, and in subsection (4) the words " eighty-two, eighty-three ", and the words " and eighty-seven ". In the Third Schedule, Parts I and II. The Fourth, Sixth, Eighth and Fifteenth Schedules.
10 & 11 Geo. 6. c. 49	Transport Act 1947	Sections twenty to twenty-four. Sections twenty-six and twenty-seven. Sections twenty-nine to thirty-two. In section ninety-four, in subsection (6), the words " nine and ten of the Regulation of Railways Act, 1871, sections thirty-two and ". In the Eleventh Schedule, in Part II, paragraph 5.
1 & 2 Eliz. 2. c. 13	Transport Act 1953	In section seven, subsections (1) to (4). Section eight. Sections twelve and thirteen.
4 & 5 Eliz. 2. c. 56	Transport (Disposal of Road Haulage Property) Act 1956	In section eight, subsections (1) to (3), and, in subsection (4), the words from " and (b) any sums " to the end.
Post Office Enactments
31 & 32 Vict. c. 110	Telegraph Act 1868	Sections four, five, seven and fourteen.
32 & 33 Vict. c. 73	Telegraph Act 1869	In section seven, the words from " which he shall " to " Telegraph Act, 1868 ". Section twenty-one.
41 & 42 Vict. c. 76	Telegraph Act 1878	In section twelve, the words from " Any notice " to " made by the Postmaster General ".
1 & 2 Geo. 6. c. 57	Imperial Telegraphs Act 1938	In section one, subsections (2) to (5).
3 & 4 Geo. 6. c. 25	Post Office and Telegraph Act 1940	Sections two and five. In section six, subsection (2).
12 & 13 Geo. 6. c. 39	Commonwealth Telegraphs Act 1949	In section nine, the words from the beginning to " operating company, and ".
1 & 2 Eliz. 2. c. 36	Post Office Act 1953	Sections thirty and sixty-seven.
Miscellaneous Enactments
30 Geo. 3. c. 48	Treason Act 1790	Section four.
36 Geo. 3. c. 85	Mills Act 1796	The whole act.
48 Geo. 3. c. 127	Marriages Confirmation Act 1808	Sections two and four.
54 Geo. 3. c. 145	Corruption of Blood Act 1814	The whole act.
7 & 8 Geo. 4. c. 75	Land Tax Commissioners Act 1827	In section one, the words from " and also " (where first occurring) to " herein-after directed ", the words from " for putting into " to " and also " (where last occurring), the words " herein-after mentioned " and the words from " (that is to say) " to the end. Section two.
3 & 4 Will. 4. c. 50	Customs (Repeal) Act 1833	The whole act.
4 & 5 Will. 4. c. 43	Justices' Qualification (Scilly Islands) Act 1834	The whole act.
11 & 12 Vict. c. 91	Poor Law Audit Act 1848	Section eleven.
20 & 21 Vict. c. 34	New Brunswick Boundary Act 1857	The whole act.
10 & 11 Geo. 6. c. 46	Wellington Museum Act 1947	In section eight, subsection (2).
12, 13 & 14 Geo. 6. c. 17	American Aid and European Payments (Financial Provisions) Act 1949	The whole act.
2 & 3 Eliz. 2. c. 26	British Industries Fair (Guarantees and Grants) Act 1954	The whole act.
7 & 8 Eliz. 2. c. 53	Town and Country Planning Act 1959	In section one, subsection (3). In section three, subsection (6). In section seven, in subsection (1) the words " or, in Scotland, of a valuator under section fifty-six of the Lands Clauses Consolidation (Scotland) Act, 1845 ", and the words " or valuator ", in subsection (2), the words " or valuator ", subsections (3) and (4), in subsection (5) the words " or subsection (3) ", and subsection (6). In section eight, subsection (4). In section nine, in subsection (2), paragraph 5 of the Table, in subsection (7), the words from " or (in a case " onwards, and subsection (9). In section eleven, subsection (2). In section twelve, subsection (4). In section fourteen, subsection (7). In section sixteen, subsection (5). In section seventeen, subsection (5). In section eighteen, subsection (9). In section nineteen, subsection (7). In section twenty, subsection (5). In section twenty-two, in subsection (4), the words " in relation to England and Wales " and the words " and, in relation to Scotland, means a body of any of the descriptions specified in Part II of that Schedule " and the words " or servitude ", and subsection (5). In section twenty-three, subsection (5). In section twenty-four, subsection (4). Section twenty-five. In section twenty-six, subsection (7). In section twenty-seven, subsection (7). In section twenty-eight, subsection (9). In section twenty-nine, subsection (2). In section thirty, in subsection (6), the words " in their application to England and Wales ". In section thirty-one, subsection (12). In section thirty-two, subsection (6). In section thirty-five, subsection (6). In section thirty-six, subsection (7). In section thirty-seven, subsection (9). In section thirty-eight, subsection (4). In section thirty-nine, subsection (7). In section forty-three, subsection (8). In section forty-four, subsection (6). In section forty-five, subsection (3). In section forty-six, subsection (4). Section forty-seven. In section forty-eight, subsection (2). In section forty-nine, subsection (4). Section fifty. In section fifty-one, subsection (5). In section fifty-two, subsection (7). In section fifty-three, subsection (3). In section fifty-four, the words " or the Scottish Act of 1954, as the case may be ". In section fifty-five, subsection (6). In section fifty-seven, in subsection (1), in the definition of " compulsory acquisition ", the words " in relation to England and Wales " and the words " and, in relation to Scotland, have the same meanings as in the Scottish Act of 1954 ", in the definition of " disposal "the words " excambion " and " servitude " and the words " or the creation of a heritable security ", in the definition of " grant-aided function " the words " or the Local Government and Miscellaneous Financial Provisions (Scotland) Act, 1958 " and the words " or any of the enactments specified in Part I of the Sixth Schedule to the Housing (Scotland) Act, 1950 ", in the definition of " the Minister ", the words " in relation to England and Wales " and the words " and in relation to Scotland means the Secretary of State ", in the definition of " planning decision ", the words " in relation to England and Wales " and the words from " and, in relation to Scotland ", to the end, in the definition of " planning permission ", the words " in relation to England and Wales " and the words " and, in relation to Scotland, means permission under Part II of the Scottish Act of 1947 ", the definitions of " the Scottish Act of 1947 " and " the Scottish Act of 1954 " and, in the definition of " tenancy ", the words " in relation to England and Wales ", in subsection (3), in paragraph (a), the words " in relation to England and Wales ", and paragraph (b); in subsection (4), the words " in relation to England and Wales " and the words from " and in relation " to the end; in subsection (5), the words " and subsections (2) and (3) of section one hundred and eight of the Scottish Act of 1947 ", the word " respectively ", and the words " and to the Third Schedule to the Scottish Act of 1947 "; in subsection (6), the words from " and in this subsection " to the end; and subsection (7). In section fifty-eight, in subsection (2), the words " and of section seventeen of the Scottish Act of 1947 ", the words " or section seventeen ", the words " or the Scottish Act of 1954 " and the words " or the Scottish Act of 1947 "; in subsection (3), the words " and section fifty-five of the Scottish Act of 1954 "; and subsection (7). In section fifty-nine, in subsection (1), the words from " and the Town and Country Planning (Scotland) Acts " to the end. In the First Schedule, paragraphs 5 and 10. In the Second Schedule, in Part I, paragraph 8, and Part II. In the Third Schedule, paragraphs 12 and 13. In the Fourth Schedule, Part II. In the Fifth Schedule, in paragraph 13, in sub-paragraph (2), the words " In the application of those subsections to England and Wales ", and sub-paragraph (3), and paragraph 17. In the Sixth Schedule, paragraphs 5 and 12 to 17. In the Seventh Schedule, the entries relating to the Town and Country Planning (Scotland) Act, 1947, and the Town and Country Planning (Scotland) Act, 1954. The Tenth Schedule.
7 & 8 Eliz. 2. c. 58	Finance Act 1959	In the Second Schedule, paragraphs 1 and 2.

== Subsequent developments ==
Section 2 of the act was repealed by section 41(1) of, and part I of schedule 6 to, the Northern Ireland Constitution Act 1973, which came into force on 18 July 1973.

Section 1(1) of, and the schedule to, the act were repealed by section 1 of, and part XI of the schedule to, the Statute Law (Repeals) Act 1974, which came into force on 27 June 1974.

== See also ==
- Statute Law Revision Act

== Bibliography ==
- Halsbury's Statutes
- HL Deb vol 225, col 319, HC Deb vol 627, cols 1032 to 1034.
