= Corruption of Blood Act 1814 =

Act of the Parliament of the United Kingdom

Corruption of Blood Act 1814 (Note: The citation of this act by this short title was authorised by section 1 of, and the first schedule to, the Short Titles Act 1896. Due to the repeal of those provisions it is now authorised by section 19(2) of the Interpretation Act 1978.)
- Act of Parliament
- Parliament of the United Kingdom
- Long title: An Act to take away Corruption of Blood save in certain Cases.
- Citation: 54 Geo. 3. c. 145
- Introduced by: Sir Samuel Romilly (Commons)
- Territorial extent: United Kingdom

Dates
- Royal assent: 27 July 1814
- Commencement: 27 July 1814 (Note: Section 1.)
- Repealed: 29 July 1960
Other legislation
Repealed by	Statute Law Revision Act 1960

Status: Repealed

Text of statute as originally enacted

The Corruption of Blood Act 1814 (54 Geo. 3. c. 145) was an act of the Parliament of the United Kingdom which abolished corruption of blood for all crimes except high treason, petty treason and murder. Corruption of blood had until then been an automatic consequence of attainder for treason and felony. (The Act did not apply to crimes committed before it was passed.) The act was the result of the efforts of the law reformer Sir Samuel Romilly MP, who had failed to pass a similar bill in 1813.

Petty treason was abolished by the Offences against the Person Act 1828. Attainder for felony and treason (and therefore corruption of blood for murder and high treason) was abolished by the Forfeiture Act 1870 (33 & 34 Vict. c. 23).

== Provisions ==
The act consisted of a single clause, which read:

[N]o attainder for felony which shall take place from and after the passing of this Act, save and except in cases of the crime of high treason, or of the crimes of petit treason or murder, or of abetting, procuring, or counselling the same, shall extend to the dis-inheriting of any heir, nor to the prejudice of the right or title of any person or persons other than the right or title of the offender or offenders during his, her, or their natural lives only; and that it shall be lawful to every person or persons, to whom the right or interest of any lands, tenements, or hereditaments after the death of any such offender or offenders should or might have appertained if no such attainder had been, to enter into the same.

== Repeal ==
The whole act was repealed by section 1(1) of, and the schedule to, the Statute Law Revision Act 1960 (8 & 9 Eliz. 2. c. 56), which came into force on 29 July 1960.
