= Railway Regulation Act 1844 =

Act of the Parliament of the United Kingdom

Railway Regulation Act 1844 (Note: The citation of this act by this short title was authorised by section 1 of, and the first schedule to, the Short Titles Act 1896. Due to the repeal of those provisions it is now authorised by section 19(2) of the Interpretation Act 1978.)
- Act of Parliament
- Parliament of the United Kingdom
- Long title: An Act to attach certain Conditions to the construction of future Railways authorised by any Act of the present or succeeding sessions of Parliament; and for other Purposes in relation to Railways.
- Citation: 7 & 8 Vict. c. 85
- Introduced by: William Ewart Gladstone
- Territorial extent: United Kingdom

Dates
- Royal assent: 9 August 1844
- Commencement: 1 January 1845 (Note: Section 1.)
- Repealed: 1 September 1962 (Note: The Transport Act 1962 (Commencement No. 1) Order 1962 (SI 1962/1788).)
Other legislation
Amended by	Statute Law Revision Act 1874 (No. 2); Cheap Trains Act 1883; Territorial Army and Militia Act 1921; Post Office Act 1953; Statute Law Revision Act 1960
Repealed by	Transport Act 1962
Relates to	Railway Regulation Act 1842; Cheap Trains Act 1883

Status: Repealed

Text of statute as originally enacted

The Railway Regulation Act 1844 (7 & 8 Vict. c. 85) was an act of the Parliament of the United Kingdom providing a minimum standard for rail passenger travel. It provided compulsory services at a price affordable to poorer people to enable them to travel to find work. It is one of the Railway Regulation Acts 1840 to 1893.

== Background ==
Until that time there were three or more classes of carriage, third class usually an open goods wagon, often without seats, sometimes referred to sarcastically as "Stanhopes", a corruption of "Stand-ups". During that year, a select committee had produced six reports on the railways, at the behest of the Board of Trade under its president, W. E. Gladstone. These led to An Act to attach certain Conditions to the construction of future Railways authorised by any Act of the present or succeeding sessions of Parliament; and for other Purposes in relation to Railways, referred to as "Gladstone's Act".

The original bill introduced into Parliament by W. E. Gladstone had been far-reaching for its time - even proposing state ownership of the railways and telegraph.

== Provisions ==
The act stated:

- One train with provision for carrying third-class passengers, should run on every line, every week day, in each direction, stopping at every station. (These are what were originally known as "parliamentary trains.")
- The fare should be 1d. per mile.
- Its average speed should not be less than 12 miles per hour (19 km/h).
- Third-class passengers should be protected from the weather and be provided with seats.

In return the railway operator was exempted from duty on third class passengers. The price was not cheap for working people. An additional requirement was that they should be allowed to carry 56 lb (25 kg) of luggage free. It helped those in search of work thus, as Smith points out, its benefit was to improve labour supply.

== Rail company reaction ==
The reaction of many railway companies was grudging acceptance of the letter, if not the spirit of the legislation, and they provided the minimum one train per day with facilities for third class passengers at an unpopular time such as early morning or late at night. These were the original parliamentary trains. The reason for the reluctance was to avoid losing revenue if passengers who could afford to travel second class switched to third if facilities there became bearable. Some companies continued to run inferior third or fourth class trains in addition to the minimum standard parliamentary train.

The Midland Railway broke ranks by providing three compartments, with glazed windows and an oil lamp in the roof, causing resentment among competitors. Finally in 1875 the standard of third class was upgraded and second class was abolished – by relabelling the coaches. It caused scandal now difficult to imagine. In the 1800s there was rigid distinction between social classes and the belief was that the railway would bring "the 'lower orders' nearer to equality with their 'betters' " Sir James Allport, general manager of the Midland Railway, in a speech said:

"If there is one part of my public life on which I look back with more satisfaction, it is with reference to the boon we conferred on third-class travellers..."

Other railways followed, and because they were obliged to provide third class, the oddity of first and third, but no second – except on boat trains – persisted into the 20th century, when third class was rebranded to second class in 1956, and then further rebranded as 'standard' to remove negative associations.

== Subsequent developments ==
Sections 2–10 and 12 of the act were repealed by section 1(1) of, and the schedule to, the Statute Law Revision Act 1960 (8 & 9 Eliz. 2. c. 56), which came into force on 29 July 1960.

The whole act was repealed by section 95 of, and the twelfth schedule to, the Transport Act 1962 (10 & 11 Eliz. 2. c. 46), which came into force on 1 September 1962.

== See also ==
- Cheap Trains Act 1883

== Bibliography ==
- Ransom, P. J. G. (1990). The Victorian Railway and How It Evolved. London: Heinemann.
- Billson, P. (1996). Derby and the Midland Railway. Derby: Breedon Books.
- McLean, I. (2004). "The history of regulation in the United Kingdom: three case studies in search of a theory". In Jordana, J.; Levi-Faur, D. (eds.). The Politics of Regulation: institutions and regulatory reforms for the age of governance. Cheltenham: Edward Elgar. pp. 45–66. ISBN 1-84376-464-4.
