= Attainder =

Ancient penalty, usually for high treason

In English common law, attainder was the metaphorical "stain" or "corruption of blood" which arose from being condemned for a serious capital crime (felony or treason). It entailed losing not only one's life, property and hereditary titles, but typically also the right to pass them on to one's heirs. Anyone condemned of capital crimes could be attainted, sometimes as a substitute for the dreaded common law treason.

Attainder by confession resulted from a guilty plea at the bar before judges or before the coroner in sanctuary. Attainder by verdict resulted from conviction by jury. Attainder by process resulted from a legislative act: parliament would outlaw a particular named fugitive (a bill of attainder). The last form is obsolete in England (and prohibited by constitutional law in the United States), and the other forms have been abolished.

== Middle Ages and Renaissance ==
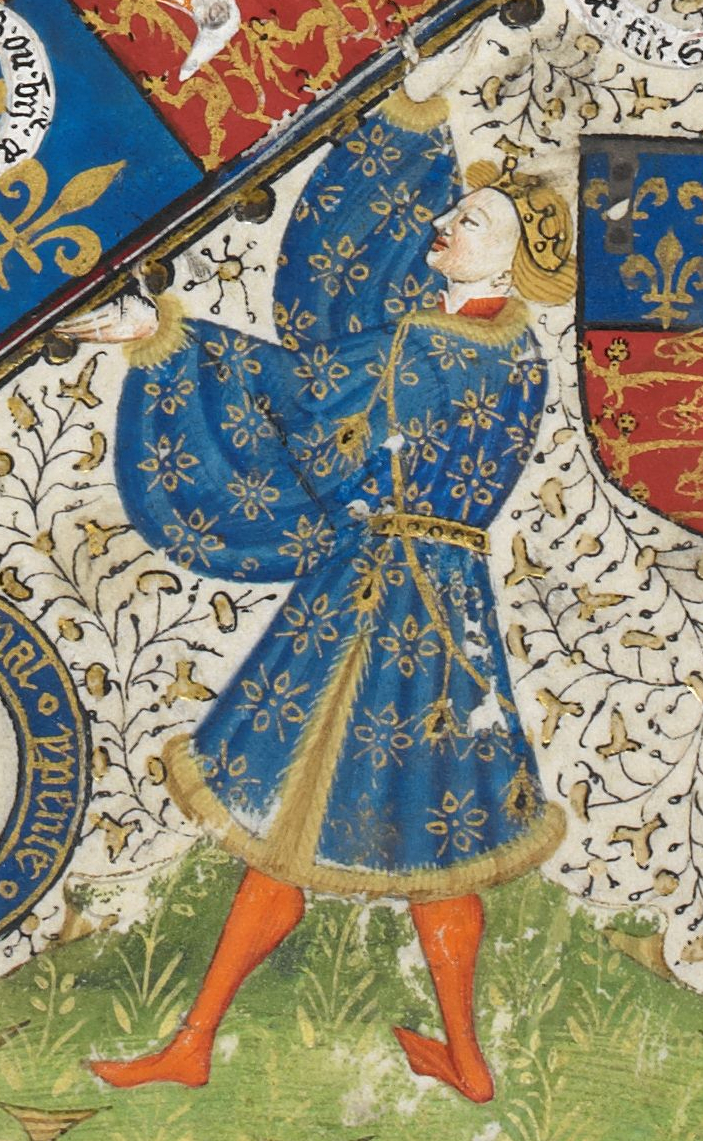
Richard of York, attainted by Margaret of Anjou

Medieval and Renaissance English monarchs used acts of attainder to deprive nobles of their lands and often their lives. Once attainted, the descendants of the noble could no longer inherit their lands or income. Attainder essentially amounted to the legal death of the attainted's family.

Monarchs typically used attainders against political enemies and those who posed potential threats to the king's position and security. The attainder eliminated any advantage the noble would have in a court of law; nobles were exempt from many of the techniques used to try commoners, including torture. Likewise, in many cases of attainder, the king could coerce the parliament into approving the attainder and there would be a lower burden of proof (evidence) than there would be in court or even no burden of proof.

Prior to the Tudors, most rulers reversed their attainders in return for promises of loyalty. For example, Henry VI reversed all 21 attainders, Edward IV 86 of 120, and Richard III 99 of 100. However, this changed with Henry VII, as described below.

Rulers who used attainder include:

- Margaret of Anjou: her attainder of Richard of York led him to invade England and attempt to seize the throne after the Battle of Northampton, which led to the penultimate phases of the War of the Roses.
- Edward IV: used attainder after killing his brother, George Plantagenet, Duke of Clarence for high treason.
- Henry VII: initially attainted men after he ascended the throne. He used the threat of attainder as a means to keep the few nobles who survived the War of the Roses in line. Often, however, he would penalize them with exorbitant fees and fines, or force them to have bonds which would be forfeit unless they exhibited good behaviour (his goal was to reduce the number of nobles with private armies of retainers). Henry VII attainted 138 men, of whom he reversed only 46 attainders, and some of these were conditional.
- Henry VIII: compelled parliament to attaint many nobles during his lifetime, including magnates with major land holdings, and any magnates whom he came to mistrust. Examples include:
  - Anne Boleyn: Before her execution, she was stripped of her title, and her marriage was annulled.
  - Catherine Howard: Henry VIII had an act of attainder passed against Howard, which made it treason for a woman who was unchaste to marry the king.
  - Edward Stafford, Duke of Buckingham, one of the wealthiest magnates in England, whom Henry had executed on flimsy charges in 1521.
  - Margaret Pole, Countess of Salisbury: One of the last surviving noble Plantagenets of senior line.
  - Henry Howard, Earl of Surrey: The poet son of Thomas Howard, 3rd Duke of Norfolk.
  - Thomas Cromwell: former principal secretary to Henry, was arrested at a Privy Council meeting in 1540, charged with treason, and then executed pursuant to a bill of attainder.
- Charles I: subsequent to the failed impeachment of his former Lord Deputy of Ireland, Sir Thomas Wentworth, 1st Earl of Strafford, was attainted during the political crisis of 1640–1641. The bill of attainder, having passed the depleted House of Commons and House of Lords, was enacted by Charles I as a concession to his political opponents. During his reign, the Long Parliament of 1641 passed an Act of Attainder against William Laud, Archbishop of Canterbury, who was beheaded in 1645.
- Charles II: Although deceased by the time of the Restoration, the regicides John Bradshaw, Oliver Cromwell, Henry Ireton and Thomas Pride were served with a bill of attainder on 15 May 1660 backdated to 1 January 1649 [O.S. 1648]).
- William III:
  - James, III and VIII, the Old Pretender, 1702
  - Lewis Crichton, 4th Viscount Frendraught, in 1690
- George II, following the Jacobite rising of 1745:
  - Attainder of Earl of Kellie and Others Act 1745

Once attainted, nobles were considered commoners, and as such, could be subjected to the same treatments, including torture and methods of execution. For example, commoners could be burned at the stake, whereas nobles could not.

Often, nobles would refer to the act of being attainted (and then executed) as the person's "destruction".

== Passage in Parliament ==
In the Westminster system, a bill of attainder was a bill passed by Parliament to attaint persons who were accused of high treason, or, in rare cases, a lesser crime. A person attainted need not have been convicted of treason in a court of law; one use of the attainder process was a method of declaring a person a fugitive. Another was applying collateral consequences of criminal conviction (especially property forfeiture) where the suspects had died and hence could not stand trial.

A rumour circulated that a bill of attainder against Thomas Jefferson was raised in 1774 following his authorship of A Summary View of the Rights of British America.

The last bill of attainder passed in Britain was against Lord Edward FitzGerald, after his death in 1798; that provided for forfeiture of his estate. Attainders by confession, verdict and process were abolished in the United Kingdom by the Forfeiture Act 1870 (33 & 34 Vict. c. 23).

Article One of the United States Constitution provides that no bill of attainder or ex post facto law shall be passed by Congress, and forbids states from passing them.

== Corruption of blood ==
Corruption of blood is one of the consequences of attainder. The descendants of an attainted person could not inherit either from the attainted person (whose property had been forfeited by the attainder) or through their other relatives from them. For example, if a person executed for a crime leaves innocent children, the property of the criminal is forfeited to the crown and will not pass to the children. If the criminal's innocent parent outlives their child, the property inherited by the parent from the criminal cannot be inherited by the criminal's children either; instead, it will be distributed among other family members.

The United States Constitution prohibits corruption of blood as a punishment for treason, (specifically, "no attainder of treason shall work corruption of blood, or forfeiture except during the life of the person attainted") and when Congress passed the first federal crime bill in 1790, it prohibited corruption of blood as a punishment for any federal crime. In England and Wales, corruption of blood was abolished (except for high treason, petty treason and murder) by the Corruption of Blood Act 1814, for petty treason with that offence's abolition by the Offences against the Person Act 1828, and for the remaining offences by the Forfeiture Act 1870.

== Examples ==
- Earl of Strafford
- John de la Pole, 1st Earl of Lincoln
- Mervyn Tuchet, 2nd Earl of Castlehaven
- Parker Wickham
- Richard FitzAlan, 11th Earl of Arundel
- Thomas Cromwell
- Earl of Perth
  - Viscount Strathallan
- Edward Plantagenet, 17th Earl of Warwick
