= Cheap Trains Act 1883 =

Act of the Parliament of the United Kingdom

Cheap Trains Act 1883 (Note: Section 1.)
- Act of Parliament
- Parliament of the United Kingdom
- Long title: An Act to amend the Law relating to Railway Passenger Duty, and to amend and consolidate the Law relating to the conveyance of the Queen's Forces by Railway.
- Citation: 46 & 47 Vict. c. 34
- Territorial extent: England and Wales; Scotland; (Note: Section 11.)

Dates
- Royal assent: 20 August 1883
- Commencement: 1 October 1883 (Note: Section 9.)
- Repealed: 31 July 1978
Other legislation
Amends	See § Repealed enactments
Amended by	Finance Act 1929; Statute Law Revision Act 1950; Statute Law Revision Act 1959; Police Act 1964; Police (Scotland) Act 1967
Repealed by	Statute Law (Repeals) Act 1978

Status: Repealed

Text of statute as originally enacted

The Cheap Trains Act 1883 (46 & 47 Vict. c. 34) was an act of the Parliament of the United Kingdom that marked the beginning of workers' train (and later bus) services. It removed the passenger duty on any train charging less than a penny (1d) a mile and obliged the railway companies to operate a larger number of cheap trains.

== Background ==
The Railway Regulation Act 1844 (7 & 8 Vict. c. 85) had established the provision of third-class coaches on what became known as "parliamentary trains". This included the right of passengers in this class to take up to 56 lb (25 kg) of luggage with them to facilitate travel in search of work. In return, the railways were exempted from paying duty on these passengers.

The duty was collected by the Board of Trade, and gradually, as services improved, the board allowed more and more exemptions, even on trains which did not stop at all stations, as required by the act. However, as the duty collected rose to around £500,000 in the 1860s, the Inland Revenue took an interest. A test case in 1874 against the North London Railway confirmed that trains had to stop at all stations for the duty to be remitted.

This duty had always been irksome to the railway operators, which felt that it hindered their development. The railway operators formed the Passenger Duty Repeal Association in 1874, followed in 1877 by another group, the Travelling Tax Abolition Committee. Between them they lobbied for the complete abolition of the duty. As is usual in those cases, the government would not agree without some quid pro quo.

== Provisions ==
This period was one of extreme overcrowding in the major cities. It was a major political issue and one solution sought by the authorities was to encourage working people to move to new housing outside the cities. However, that implied the availability of cheap transport since even a penny a mile was beyond most people's reach.

The act applied to all trains charging less than a penny a mile, even those that did not stop at all stations. The Board of Trade could decide whether a company's services were adequate and reasonably priced. If it felt otherwise, it could remove the company's exemption on all of its services.

=== Repealed enactments ===
Section 10 of the act repealed 5 enactments, listed in the schedule to the act.

Citation	Short title	Description	Extent of repeal
5 & 6 Vict. c. 55	Railway Regulation Act 1842	An Act for the better regulation of railways and for the conveyance of troops.	Section twenty.
7 & 8 Vict. c. 85	Railway Regulation Act 1844	An Act to attach certain conditions to the construction of future railways authorised or to be authorised by any Act of the present or succeeding sessions of Parliament; and for other purposes in relation to railways.	Sections six, seven, eight, nine, ten, and twelve.
16 & 17 Vict. c. 69	Naval Enlistment Act 1853	An Act to make better provision concerning the entry and service of seamen, and otherwise to amend the laws concerning Her Majesty's Navy.	Section eighteen.
21 & 22 Vict. c. 75	Cheap Trains and Canal Carriers Act 1858	An Act to amend the law relating to cheap trains, and to restrain the exercise of certain powers by canal companies being also railway companies.	Sections one and two.
26 & 27 Vict. c. 33	Revenue Act 1863	An Act for granting to Her Majesty certain duties of inland revenue; and to amend the laws relating to the inland revenue.	Section fourteen.

== Subsequent developments ==
Sections 3 and 5, and in section eight, the definitions of " fare " and " minimum fare " and the words from " Provided that " onwards, were repealed by section 2 of, and the second schedule to, the Statute Law Revision Act 1959 (7 & 8 Eliz. 2. c. 68), which came into force on 29 July 1959.

Some railways in London were already operating workmen's trains although they were often overcrowded and inconveniently timed. Although the act was opposed by some railway officers, notably Sir Edward Watkin of the Manchester, Sheffield and Lincolnshire Railway, the number of cheap suburban services increased greatly. During the 20th century, the appearance of competing road services meant that the railways were forced to reduce their fares. So few services eventually attracted duty that the act was abolished in the Finance Act 1929 (19 & 20 Geo. 5. c. 21).

Sections 3(3), 6(3) and 6(4), and section 10 from " and except as " to the end of the section, were repealed by section 1(1) of, and the first schedule to, the Statute Law Revision Act 1950 (14 Geo. 6. c. 6), which came into force on 23 May 1950.

The whole act, including as applied by any other enactment, was repealed by section 1(1) of, and part XV of schedule 1 to, the Statute Law (Repeals) Act 1978, which came into force on 31 July 1978.
