= Regulation of Railways Act 1889 =

Act of the Parliament of the United Kingdom

Regulation of Railways Act 1889 (Note: Section 8(1).)
- Act of Parliament
- Parliament of the United Kingdom
- Long title: An Act to amend the Regulation of Railways Acts; and for other purposes.
- Citation: 52 & 53 Vict. c. 57
- Introduced by: Sir Michael Hicks Beach (Commons)
- Territorial extent: United Kingdom

Dates
- Royal assent: 30 August 1889
- Commencement: 30 August 1889 (Note: The Acts of Parliament (Commencement) Act 1793.)
Other legislation
Amended by	Railway and Canal Commission (Abolition) Act 1949; Transport Act 1962; British Railways Act 1965; London Transport Act 1965

Status: Amended

Text of statute as originally enacted

Revised text of statute as amended

Text of the Regulation of Railways Act 1889 as in force today (including any amendments) within the United Kingdom, from legislation.gov.uk.

The Regulation of Railways Act 1889 (52 & 53 Vict. c. 57) is an act of the Parliament of the United Kingdom. It is one of the Railway Regulation Acts 1840 to 1893. It was enacted following the Armagh rail disaster.

== Safety ==
It empowered the Board of Trade to require any railway company to:

- adopt the block system of signalling on any passenger railway;
- provide for the interlocking of points and signals on such railways;
- provide for and use on all passenger trains continuous brakes; the brakes must be instantaneous in action; self applying in the event of any failure in continuity; capable of being applied to every vehicle of the train; and in regular use in daily working.

Provision was made to enable the railway companies to issue debentures to pay for the capital cost of the equipment.

There were also provisions regarding reporting the number of persons in safety-related employment who worked more than a specified number of hours.

== Tickets ==
The act also requires passengers to show tickets and to pay a penalty if travelling without a ticket. It also gives powers to agents of the railway to request a name and address and to make it an offence not to provide these details when requested. Prosecutions are still brought under the Act today.

== Misuse ==
Several rail companies from 2020 privately prosecuted cases of alleged fare evasion under the Act using the Single justice procedure (SJP), whereby a lay magistrate can try cases without a court hearing. However, the SJP cannot be used for the 1889 act, and in August 2024 the UK's chief magistrate declared six test cases as void, as the process should never have been used. This led to plans to void over 74,000 other similar cases. At least some of the prosecutions were clearly not intentional evasion, which could not be tested in the SJP procedure; for example a man prosecuted for trying to pay a £3.50 fare at his destination as the ticket machine at the station he boarded from was not working, and there was no guard on the train.
