= Railway and Canal Traffic Act 1854 =

Act of the Parliament of the United Kingdom

Railway and Canal Traffic Act 1854 (Note: Section 8.)
- Act of Parliament
- Parliament of the United Kingdom
- Long title: An Act for the better Regulation of the Traffic on Railways and Canals.
- Citation: 17 & 18 Vict. c. 31
- Introduced by: Edward Cardwell, 1st Viscount Cardwell (Lords)
- Territorial extent: United Kingdom

Dates
- Royal assent: 10 July 1854
- Commencement: 10 July 1854 (Note: The Acts of Parliament (Commencement) Act 1793.)
- Repealed: 1 September 1962
Other legislation
Amended by	Regulation of Railways Act 1873; Railway and Canal Traffic Act 1888; Railways Act 1921; Railway and Canal Commission (Abolition) Act 1949
Repealed by	Transport Act 1962
Relates to	Carriers Act 1830

Status: Repealed

Status
- England and Wales: Repealed
- Scotland: Repealed
- Republic of Ireland: In force
- Northern Ireland: Repealed

Text of statute as originally enacted

The Railway and Canal Traffic Act 1854 (17 & 18 Vict. c. 31), also known as Cardwell's Act, was an act of the Parliament of the United Kingdom regulating the operation of railways. The railways were already considered to be common carriers and thus subject to the Carriers Act 1830 (11 Geo. 4 & 1 Will. 4. c. 68), but the 1854 act placed additional obligations on the railways due to their monopoly status. Each railway company was now required to take all trade offered and to set and publish the same levels of fares to all in respect of any particular service.

The act marked a milestone in English law and has also served as the foundation of similar legislation in the United States.

It is one of the Railway and Canal Traffic Acts 1854 to 1894.

== Historical context ==
The introduction of the railways from the 1830s onwards led to new possibilities for the transport of goods which previously had not been commonly carried at all. This led to the courts affording a certain degree of latitude to railway carriers, permitting them to make agreements for the purpose of protecting themselves against the new risks and dangers of carriage inherent to the goods they were transporting. It was not long before the railway companies were exploiting this new freedom, taking advantage of their dominance of the transport sector to impose stringent and often oppressive terms of business that limited their exposure to risk. The courts felt compelled to give effect to these agreements to which the parties to the contract had deliberately agreed unless there was evidence of fraud or illegality.

As Sir Alexander Cockburn told the House of Lords in 1863:

There cannot be a doubt that, practically speaking, the introduction of railways has destroyed the competition which formerly existed, and the effect of which was to secure to the goods owner fair and reasonable terms [...] [T]he absence of other means of conveyance, as well as the increased rapidity of transport, compels the owner of goods, at least for all the purposes of business, to resort to railway conveyance. He is thus at the mercy of the carrier, and has no alternative but to submit to any terms, however unjust and oppressive, which the latter may think fit to impose.

The act therefore sought to put an end to this practice and reverse the jurisprudence in favour of railway operators, returning to the pre-railway age position where the courts were in the habit of construing contracts between individuals and carriers to the disadvantage of the latter.

The act was promoted by Edward Cardwell, the President of the Board of Trade and chairman of the select committee responsible for the examination of the various amalgamation bills passing through Parliament. The committee recommended that "Parliament should secure freedom and economy of transit from one end of the kingdom to the other and should compel railway companies to give the public the full advantage of convenient interchange from one railway system to another", and so came about the Railway and Canal Act 1854.

== Main provisions ==
=== Receiving and forwarding traffic without delay ===
An obligation was placed on railway and canal companies "to afford all reasonable facilities for the receiving and forwarding, and delivering of traffic" without delay to and from their railways and canals. This provision sought to put an end to the practice whereby an operator, taking advantage of the monopoly it enjoyed over the provision of services within its area, did not deal with all customers in a uniform manner, perhaps favouring some to the disadvantage of others.

In a case decided in 1910, the Court of Appeal rejected a claim by Spillers that the Great Western Railway had breached this obligation when it refused to transport Spillers' loaded grain vans. According to Lord Justice Kennedy, the railway was only obliged to transport "merchandise", this being the only possible interpretation of "traffic".

=== No undue preference or prejudice ===
Railways and canal companies had to publish and set the same fares for any particular service, they could not discriminate between passengers or goods transporters by giving or offering "any undue or unreasonable preference or advantage" in respect of the services provided or, conversely, suffer prejudice by comparison with other users.

=== Continuous and unobstructed services ===
Transport services were to be provided "at all times" and without any "obstruction" to passengers or goods. This reinforced the idea that the railways and canals formed a special and important category of business services which were to be made freely available and, insofar as possible, permanently available.

=== Liability for loss and damage ===
Section 7 of the act imposed liability on an operator for loss or injury to "horses, cattle or other animals", or to any "articles, goods or things" in the course of their carriage by the operator as a result of his "neglect or default". Where the operator had attempted to limit or exclude his liability for such loss in the contract for carriage, the exclusion clause would only operate where it was "just and reasonable". It would fall to the judge trying a case under the 1854 Act to determine whether the clause was just and reasonable.

The damages recoverable from the operator were capped at £50 for each horse, £15 for any cattle per head and £2 for each sheep or pig. It was however open to the customer to ask for the level of compensation to be raised by paying the excess of the increased amount.

Although this provision prevented routine exclusions of liability for gross negligence, misconduct or fraud by operators, it did not disturb the protection afforded by section 1 of the Carriers Act 1830 (limitation of liability for the loss of certain goods above £10), or abridge the right to contact out of strict liability.

This provision is one of the first attempts by Parliament to introduce legislative controls on unfair terms in contracts. It requires the court trying the case to decide whether the clause in question is "just and reasonable". There followed a flurry of cases on the question of what exactly constituted just and reasonable and from there developed the so-called doctrine of the "fair alternative". The definitive judgment on the question was delivered by Justice Blackburn in Peek v The North Staffordshire Railway Company (1863) where he said that:

a condition exempting the carriers wholly from liability for the neglect or default of their servants is prima facie unreasonable. I do not go as far as to say that it is necessarily in every case unreasonable and void, if [a carrier] offers in the alternative to carry on terms that he shall have no liability at all and holds forth as an inducement a reduction of the price below that which would be reasonable remuneration for carrying at owner's risk, [...] I think that a condition thus offered may be reasonable enough.

In other words, a clause purporting to limit a railway company's liability would be considered invalid unless the customer was offered an inducement to agree to the clause in the shape of, for example, a reduction in the cost of freight.

=== Remedies for breach of the act ===
Violation of the act was a civil and not criminal matter and proceedings could be brought before the Court of Common Pleas (England and Wales), Her Majesty's Superior Courts (Ireland) or the Court of Session (Scotland). The court could issue an injunction (interdict in Scotland) and could order the payment of a fine not exceeding £200.

== Legacy ==
Sir William Hodges, a contemporary railway law commentator, welcomed the Parliament's attempt to regulate the carrying of freight and passengers on railways. He believed that

"[t]he necessity of a supervision of some kind over the traffic on our railways has long been acknowledged and it was felt that it would be an intolerable abuse if the Queens' subjects were deprived (by the railways) of the protection which the crown formerly afforded them when travelling over the ancient highways. Moreover, it may be assumed that the need for rigorous control and supervision is even more necessary than formerly when before the railways there could be no monopoly of the means of conveyance."

The act proved, however, to be ineffectual in dealing with the problems posed by dominant railway companies. The requirement that clauses limiting liability should be just and reasonable was taken by the courts to mean that as long as the contract was made in a just and reasonable way, the result would be regarded as just and reasonable. To reach an agreement which would be considered as "just and reasonable", a carrier had just to offer a customer the option of purchasing insurance for negligence at a reduced cost. If the customer proceeded without this cover, he had no grounds for challenging the agreement. Judges considered that the availability of a fairly priced alternative to limited liability gave adequate protection against coercion on the part of the carrier.

A royal commission was established in 1865 to investigate the charges imposed by the railway industry. This was followed up by another select committee inquiry led by Lord Carlingford, President of the Board of Trade, which proposed the creation of a "Railway and Canal Commission" to oversee the rail industry. The committee noted that the Board of Trade was not "sufficiently judicial" to carry out this task, that the courts were insufficiently informed about the workings of the industry and that a parliamentary committee did not have the necessary permanence. The result was the Regulation of Railways Act 1873 (36 & 37 Vict. c. 48) which created the Railway Commissioners to enforce the act. The Railway and Canal Traffic Act 1888 (51 & 52 Vict. c. 25) replaced them by a court of record named the "Railway and Canal Commission".

== Subsequent developments ==
The whole act was repealed by section 95(1) of, and part I of the twelfth schedule to, the Transport Act 1962 (10 & 11 Eliz. 2. c. 46), which came into force on 1 September 1962.
