= Railway interest =

British parliamentarians with an interest in railways

The railway interest was the Lords and MPs in the British parliament who held directorships or senior administrative posts in railway companies in the 19th century. They could be relied upon to vote in the interest of the railways when legislation aimed at controlling the companies' actions was proposed, and to persuade their fellow members, most of whom will have been railway shareholders, to follow suit. While the monopoly position of railways in inland transport remained unchallenged, the influence of the railway interest in resisting rates' control and safety improvements was a continuing concern both to free-trade liberals and to the aristocracy/landed-gentry with a dependence on farming. The 'interest' was particularly strong as divisions were often not whipped on party lines until the end of the century.

'Railway members' of the House of Commons were listed in some early editions of Bradshaw's Almanack, directory and shareholder's guides from 1847, and both Lords and MPs who were railway directors were listed continuously there from 1858 to 1923. Geoffrey Alderman shows that from 1868 to 1879 the number of MPs holding railway directorships was between 106 and 132 (out of 640 seats) that is, roughly up to a fifth of the house. This fell somewhat in 1880–1891 to 78–108, fell again in the 1890s to 65–79 and later in first decade of the 1900s to 34–50, which effectively saw the end of the interest's influence during the Liberal administration of 1906–1910.

== Sources ==
- Alderman, Geoffrey, The railway interest, Leicester, Leicester University Press, 1973, ISBN 0-7185-1111-5
