= Regulation of Railways Act 1868 =

Act of the British Parliament

Regulation of Railways Act 1868 (Note: Section 1.)
- Act of Parliament
- Parliament of the United Kingdom
- Long title: An Act to amend the Law relating to Railways.
- Citation: 31 & 32 Vict. c. 119
- Territorial extent: United Kingdom

Dates
- Royal assent: 31 July 1868
- Commencement: 31 July 1868 (Note: The Acts of Parliament (Commencement) Act 1793.)
Other legislation
Amended by	Railway Companies Meetings Act 1869; Regulation of Railways Act 1871; Statute Law Revision Act 1875; Lands Clauses (Taxation of Costs) Act 1895; Perjury Act 1911; Railways Act 1921; False Oaths (Scotland) Act 1933; Justices of the Peace Act 1949; Post Office Act 1953; Transport Charges &c. (Miscellaneous Provisions) Act 1954; Clean Air Act 1956; Statute Law Revision Act 1959; Statute Law Revision Act 1960; Transport Act 1962; Criminal Procedure (Scotland) Act 1975; London Transport Act 1977; British Railways Act 1977; Criminal Justice Act 1982; Statute Law (Repeals) Act 1989; Public Telecommunication System Designation (Encom Cable TV & Telecommunications Limited) (Epping Forest) Order 1994; Railway Safety (Miscellaneous Provisions) Regulations 1997

Status: Amended

Text of statute as originally enacted

Text of the Regulation of Railways Act 1868 as in force today (including any amendments) within the United Kingdom, from legislation.gov.uk.

The Regulation of Railways Act 1868 (31 & 32 Vict. c. 119) is an act of the Parliament of the United Kingdom. It is one of the Railway Regulation Acts 1840 to 1893.

It was enacted following the first murder on the railways, that of Thomas Briggs by Franz Muller near Hackney in 1864.

The act made new provisions for:

- ensuring a method was available for allowing passengers to communicate with the train's guard, if the train was scheduled to travel more than 20 miles (32 km) without stopping;
- establishing a fine for passengers raising the alarm without due cause (warnings of this fact still routinely appear near train emergency alarms);
- removing trees near railway lines that might fall and block the train;
- a penalty for trespassing on the railway.

Despite the legislation, it was not until 1899 that internal emergency wires came to be used on the majority of trains.

The act also made provision for the construction and working of a railway as a light railway, 'subject to such conditions and regulations as the Board of Trade may from time to time impose or make'. Section 28 of the act laid down maximum permitted axle weights and specified that 'the regulations respecting the speed of trains shall not authorise a rate of speed exceeding at any time twenty-five miles an hour [40 km/h]'. The Light Railways Act 1896 (59 & 60 Vict. c. 48) subsequently introduced more comprehensive legislation governing light railways.

== Subsequent developments ==
Sections 17, 18, 20 and 21 of the act were repealed by section 2 of, and the second schedule to, the Statute Law Revision Act 1959 (7 & 8 Eliz. 2. c. 68), which came into force on 29 July 1959.

Section 38 of the act was repealed by section 1(1) of, and the schedule to, the Statute Law Revision Act 1960 (8 & 9 Eliz. 2. c. 56), which came into force on 29 July 1960.

Sections 36 and 37 of the act were repealed by section 91(1) of, and the third schedule to, the Post Office Act 1953 (1 & 2 Eliz. 2. c. 36), which came into force on 31 August 1953.
