= Railways Act 1921 =

Act of the Parliament of the United Kingdom

Railways Act 1921 (Note: Section 86(1).)
- Act of Parliament
- Parliament of the United Kingdom
- Long title: An Act to provide for the reorganisation and further regulation of Railways and the discharge of liabilities arising in connection with the possession of Railways, and otherwise to amend the Law relating to Railways, and to extend the duration of the Rates Advisory Committee.
- Citation: 11 & 12 Geo. 5. c. 55
- Introduced by: Eric Geddes (Commons)
- Territorial extent: England and Wales; Scotland; Northern Ireland (in part); (Note: Section 84.)

Dates
- Royal assent: 19 August 1921
- Commencement: 19 August 1921 (Note: The Acts of Parliament (Commencement) Act 1793)
- Repealed: Northern Ireland: 13 April 1976
Other legislation
Amends	Carriers Act 1830; Railways Clauses Consolidation Act 1845; Railways Clauses Consolidation (Scotland) Act 1845; Railway and Canal Traffic Act 1854; Railways Clauses Act 1863; Regulation of Railways Act 1868; Regulation of Railways Act 1873; Railway and Canal Traffic Act 1888; Railway and Canal Traffic Act 1894; Light Railways Act 1896; Light Railways Act 1912; Tramways (Temporary Increase of Charges) Act 1920; Expiring Laws, Continuance Act 1920
Repeals/revokes	Light Railways Commissioners (Salaries) Act 1901; Railway and Canal Traffic Act 1913
Amended by	Trustee Act 1925; Local Government (Scotland) Act 1947; Transport Act 1947; Statute Law Revision Act 1953; Statute Law Revision Act 1959; Statute Law Revision Act 1960; Transport Act 1962; Local Government Act 1966; Statute Law (Repeals) Act 1978; Roads (Scotland) Act 1984; Statute Law (Repeals) Act 1986; Transport and Works Act 1992
Repealed by	Northern Ireland: Statute Law Revision Act 1953, Statute Law Revision Act 1966 and Statute Law Revision (Northern Ireland) Act 1976

Status: Partially repealed

Text of statute as originally enacted

Revised text of statute as amended

Text of the Railways Act 1921 as in force today (including any amendments) within the United Kingdom, from legislation.gov.uk.

The Railways Act 1921 (11 & 12 Geo. 5. c. 55), also known as the Grouping Act, is an act of Parliament of the United Kingdom. It was intended to stem the losses being made by many of the country's 120 railway companies by "grouping" them into four large companies, dubbed the "Big Four". The system of the "Big Four" lasted until the nationalisation of the railways in 1947.

During World War I, the British government had taken control, although not ownership, of British railways. The intention behind the Act was to reduce inefficient internal competition between railway companies and retain some of the benefits which the country had derived from a government-controlled railway system during the war. The act took effect immediately; it was passed in August 1921, with most of the amalgamations occurring at the start of 1923, although some occurred earlier and a few took a few more months to be fully settled.

== History ==
The British railway system had been built up by more than a hundred railway companies, large and small, and often, particularly locally, in competition with each other. The parallel railways of the East Midlands, and the rivalry between the South Eastern Railway and the London, Brighton and South Coast Railway at Hastings, were two examples of such local competition.

During the First World War, the railways were under state control which continued until 1921. Complete nationalisation had been considered, and the Railways Act 1921 is sometimes seen as a precursor to that, but the concept was rejected, and nationalisation was subsequently carried out after the Second World War, under the Transport Act 1947.

The form of the act was developed by the Minister of Transport, Eric Geddes, who was a former North Eastern Railway executive. Geddes favoured using amalgamations to create privately owned regional monopolies, and suggested increased worker participation from pre-war levels. He viewed the pre-war competition as wasteful, but was opposed to nationalisation on the grounds that it led to poor management, as well as a mutually corrupting influence between railway and political interests. In his 9 March 1920 Cabinet paper, Future Transport Policy, he proposed five English groups (Southern, Western, North Western, Eastern and North Eastern), a London passenger group, and separate single groupings for Scotland and Ireland.

Geddes' proposals became the 1920 white paper, Outline of Proposals as to the Future Organisation of Transport Undertakings in Great Britain and their Relation to the State (Cmd. 787). That suggested the formation of six or seven regional companies, and suggested worker participation on the board of directors of the company. The white paper was opposed by the Railway Companies' Association (RCA) and by MPs representing railway companies' interests. The move to greater worker participation was strongly opposed by the RCA, but supported by the Labour Party. Worker-directors were not included in the final act, being replaced by agreed negotiating mechanisms.

In 1921, the white paper, Memorandum on Railways Bill (Cmd. 1292), suggested four English regional groups and two Scottish groups. Scottish railway companies wanted to be incorporated into British groupings, and the RCA proposed five British regional monopolies including the Scottish businesses.

After consideration of the Railways Bill, it was decided that the Scottish companies, originally destined to be a separate group, would be included with the Midland/North Western and Eastern groups respectively, in order that the three main Anglo-Scottish trunk routes should each be owned by one company for their full length: the West Coast Main Line and the Midland Main Line by the former group, and the East Coast Main Line by the latter.

== The act ==
The opening paragraph of the Railways Act 1921 states:

With a view to the reorganisation and more efficient and economical working of the railway system of Great Britain railways shall be formed into groups in accordance with the provisions of this Act, and the principal railway companies in each group shall be amalgamated, and other companies absorbed in manner provided by this Act.

Part 1 of the act dealt with the terms and procedure of the amalgamations of railway companies. The constituents and subsidiaries of the four groups were set out in the first schedule of the act. Companies that had not formed an amalgamation scheme by 1923 would be amalgamated under terms decided by a tribunal.

Part 2 dealt with powers and regulation of the railway companies by the Railway and Canal Commission, part 3 dealt with railway rates, charges and conditions of carriage with powers given to a Railway Rates Tribunal, and part 4 with employee wages and conditions.

Parts 5 and 6 dealt with light railways and general clauses respectively, with the general clauses of part 6 including the requirement of the railway companies to provide the Minister of Transport with statistic and financial reports.

The third reading of the act in the House of Commons took place on 9 August 1921, and was passed with a majority of 237 to 62. The House of Lords made various amendments, which were accepted by the Commons on 19 August, and royal assent was given. The state control of the railways which began under war conditions during World War I was to continue for a further two years under the Ministry of Transport Act 1919.

The act took effect on 1 January 1923. On that date most of the mergers took place, although some had taken place during the previous year. The February 1923 issue of The Railway Magazine dubbed the new companies as "The Big Four of the New Railway Era".

=== Groups ===
==== Southern Group ====
Constituent companies (amalgamated)	Subsidiary companies (absorbed)
London and South Western Railway; London, Brighton and South Coast Railway; South Eastern Railway; London, Chatham and Dover Railway; South Eastern and Chatham Railway	Bridgwater Railway; Brighton and Dyke Railway; Freshwater, Yarmouth and Newport Railway; Hayling Railways; Isle of Wight Railway; Isle of Wight Central Railway; Lee-on-the-Solent Railway; London and Greenwich Railway; Mid-Kent Railway (Bromley to Saint Mary Cray); North Cornwall Railway; Plymouth and Dartmoor Railway; Plymouth, Devonport and South Western Junction Railway; Sidmouth Railway; Victoria Station and Pimlico Railway

==== Western Group ====
Constituent companies (amalgamated)	Subsidiary companies (absorbed)
Great Western Railway; Barry Railway; Cambrian Railways; Cardiff Railway; Rhymney Railway; Taff Vale Railway; Alexandra (Newport and South Wales) Docks and Railway	Brecon and Merthyr Tydfil Junction Railway; Burry Port and Gwendreath Valley Railway; Cleobury Mortimer and Ditton Priors Light Railway; Didcot, Newbury and Southampton Railway; Exeter Railway; Forest of Dean Central Railway; Gwendreath Valleys Railway; Lampeter, Aberayron and New Quay Light Railway; Liskeard and Looe Railway; Llanelly and Mynydd Mawr Railway; Mawddwy Railway; Midland and South Western Junction Railway; Neath and Brecon Railway; Penarth Extension Railway; Penarth Harbour, Dock and Railway; Port Talbot Railway and Docks; Princetown Railway; Rhondda and Swansea Bay Railway; Ross and Monmouth Railway; South Wales Mineral Railway; Teign Valley Railway; Vale of Glamorgan Railway; Van Railway; Welshpool and Llanfair Light Railway; West Somerset Railway; Wrexham and Ellesmere Railway

==== North Western, Midland, and West Scottish Group ====
Constituent companies (amalgamated)	Subsidiary companies (absorbed)
London and North Western Railway; Midland Railway; Lancashire and Yorkshire Railway; North Staffordshire Railway; Furness Railway; Caledonian Railway; Glasgow and South Western Railway; Highland Railway	Arbroath and Forfar Railway; Brechin and Edzell District Railway; Callander and Oban Railway; Cathcart District Railway; Charnwood Forest Railway; Cleator and Workington Junction Railway; Cockermouth, Keswick and Penrith Railway; Dearne Valley Railway; Dornoch Light Railway; Dundee and Newtyle Railway; Harborne Railway; Killin Railway; Lanarkshire and Ayrshire Railway; Knott End Railway; Leek and Manifold Valley Light Railway; Maryport and Carlisle Railway; Mold and Denbigh Junction Railway; North and South Western Junction Railway; North London Railway; Portpatrick and Wigtownshire Joint Railways; Shropshire Union Railways and Canal; Solway Junction Railway; Stratford-upon-Avon and Midland Junction Railway; Tottenham and Forest Gate Railway; Wick and Lybster Light Railway; Wirral Railway; Yorkshire Dales Railway

==== North Eastern, Eastern, and East Scottish Group ====
Constituent companies (amalgamated)	Subsidiary companies (absorbed)
North Eastern Railway; Great Central Railway; Great Eastern Railway; Great Northern Railway; Hull and Barnsley Railway; North British Railway; Great North of Scotland Railway	Brackenhill Light Railway; Colne Valley and Halstead Railway; East and West Yorkshire Union Railways; East Lincolnshire Railway; Edinburgh and Bathgate Railway; Forcett Railway; Forth and Clyde Junction Railway; Gifford and Garvald Railway; Great North of England, Clarence and Hartlepool Junction Railway; Horncastle Railway; Humber Commercial Railway and Dock; Kilsyth and Bonnybridge Railway; Lauder Light Railway; London and Blackwall Railway; Mansfield Railway; Mid-Suffolk Light Railway; Newburgh and North Fife Railway; North Lindsey Light Railways; Nottingham and Grantham Railway and Canal; Nottingham Joint Station Committee; Nottingham Suburban Railway; Seaforth and Sefton Junction Railway; Sheffield District Railway; South Yorkshire Junction Railway; Stamford and Essendine Railway; West Riding and Grimsby Railway

== Lines outside the act ==
A number of joint railways remained outside the Big Four, continuing to be operated jointly by the successor companies. They included the Midland and Great Northern Joint Railway (M&GN), a London, Midland and Scottish Railway/London and North Eastern Railway joint line in eastern England, the largest of the joint railways in terms of route mileage; the Cheshire Lines Committee (CLC), LMS/LNER joint line in Lancashire and Cheshire, largest in terms of both passenger and freight traffic; and the Somerset and Dorset Joint Railway (S&DJR), a joint LMS/SR line in south-western England.

The London suburban railway companies, such as the Underground Electric Railways Company of London and the Metropolitan Railway, were also excluded. Later, the London Passenger Transport Act 1933 amalgamated them, along with London area bus and tram operations, into the London Passenger Transport Board (see List of transport undertakings transferred to the London Passenger Transport Board).

Other exempted railways were light railways authorised under the Light Railways Act 1896 and similar lines, although some of those lines still chose to join the groups. The lines which remained independent were principally those under the influence of Colonel Stephens, who had been instrumental in securing the necessary exemption.

== Subsequent developments ==
The following provisions were repealed by section 1 of, and the first schedule to, the Statute Law Revision Act 1953 (2 & 3 Eliz. 2. c. 5), which came into force on 18 December 1953.

- Subsection (3) of section 2.
- Section 3.
- Subsection (3) of section 4.
- Sections 5 and 6.
- Subsections (1), (2) and (5) to (7) of section 7.
- Subsections (1) to (4) and (6) of section 8.
- Sections 9 and 10.
- Subsections (3) to (10) of section 11.
- Sections 12 and 13.
- Section 60.
- Subsection (4) of section 80.

Section 70 of the act was repealed by section 1(1) of, and part XIII of schedule 1 to, the Statute Law (Repeals) Act 1986, which came into force on 2 May 1986.

== See also ==
- UK enterprise law
- List of railway companies involved in the 1923 Grouping
- UK labour law
- History of rail transport in Great Britain 1923–1947
- The four groups listed in the act, later known as the "Big Four" companies:
- # The Southern Group, see Southern Railway (SR)
- # The Western Group, see Great Western Railway (GWR)
- # The North Western, Midland, and West Scottish Group, see London, Midland and Scottish Railway (LMS)
- # The North Eastern, Eastern, and East Scottish Group, see London and North Eastern Railway (LNER)

== Bibliography ==
- Brodie, Douglas (2003), A History of British Labour Law, 1867-1945, Hart Publishing, ISBN 1-84113-015-X
- E McGaughey, 'Votes at Work in Britain: Shareholder Monopolisation and the ‘Single Channel’ (2018) 47(1) Industrial Law Journal 76
