= Transport Act 1947 =

Act of the Parliament of the United Kingdom

Transport Act 1947 (Note: Section 128(1).)
- Act of Parliament
- Parliament of the United Kingdom
- Long title: An Act to provide for the establishment of a British Transport Commission concerned with transport and certain other related matters, to specify their powers and duties, to provide for the transfer to them of undertakings, parts of undertakings, property, rights, obligations and liabilities, to amend the law relating to transport, inland waterways, harbours and port facilities, to make certain consequential provision as to income tax, to make provision as to pensions and gratuities in the case of certain persons who become officers of the Minister of Transport, and for purposes connected with the matters aforesaid.
- Citation: 10 & 11 Geo. 6. c. 49
- Territorial extent: United Kingdom (Note: Section 127.)

Dates
- Royal assent: 6 August 1947
- Commencement: 6 August 1947 (in part); 1 January 1948 (rest); (Note: Section 12(1).)
- Repealed: 1 January 1963
Other legislation
Amends	Railways Act 1921; London Passenger Transport Act 1933
Amended by	Statute Law Revision Act 1953; Law Reform (Limitation of Actions, etc.) Act 1954; Statute Law Revision Act 1959; Charities Act 1960
Repealed by	Local Government Act 1948; Transport Act 1953; Post Office Act 1953; Road Traffic Act 1960; Statute Law Revision Act 1960; Road Traffic Act 1960; Transport Act 1962; Transport Act 1968; Statute Law (Repeals) Act 1974

Status: Repealed

Text of statute as originally enacted

The Transport Act 1947 (10 & 11 Geo. 6. c. 49) was an act of the Parliament of the United Kingdom. Under the terms of the act, the railway network, long-distance road haulage and various other types of transport were nationalised; they were aligned under the administration of the British Transport Commission. The BTC was responsible to the Ministry of Transport for general transport policy, which it exercised principally through financial control of a number of executives, set up to manage specified sections of the industry under schemes of delegation.

== Overview ==
The act was part of the nationalisation agenda of Clement Attlee's Labour government and took effect from 1 January 1948. In Northern Ireland, the Ulster Transport Authority acted in a similar manner. The government also nationalised other means of transport such as: canals, sea and shipping ports, bus companies, and eventually, in the face of much opposition, road haulage. All of these transport modes, including British Railways, were brought under the control of a new body, the British Transport Commission (BTC).

The BTC was a part of a highly ambitious scheme to create a publicly owned, centrally planned and integrated transport system. In theory, the BTC was to co-ordinate different modes of transport, to co-operate and supplement each other instead of competing. This was to be achieved by means of fare and rate adjustments; in practice, little integration between modes ever materialised.

Section five of the act provided for the setting up of a number of executives within the BTC: the Railway Executive; the Docks and Inland Waterways Executive; the Road Transport Executive; and the London Transport Executive were to be created immediately, with the Hotels Executive to be set up at a later date. The same section allowed the number and names of these executives to be varied as necessary.

== Road transport ==
The road haulage industry bitterly opposed nationalisation and found allies in the Conservative Party. Once the Conservatives were elected in 1951, road haulage was soon privatised and deregulated, but the railways and buses remained regulated; they were left under the control of the British Transport Commission.

== Railways ==
Following the Second World War, the Big Four railway companies of the grouping era were effectively bankrupt, and the act was intended to bring about some stability in transport policy. As part of that policy, British Railways was established to run the network. The Transport Act (Northern Ireland) 1948 (c. 16 (N.I.)) later transferred the lines in Northern Ireland formerly of the LMS, the Northern Counties Committee, to the Ulster Transport Authority.

Shares in the railway companies were exchanged for British Transport Stock, with a guaranteed 3% return chargeable to the BTC, and were repayable after forty years.

The level of compensation paid has proved to be a matter of historical controversy. Some commentators, including The Economist and the London Stock Exchange stated that because the government based the levels of compensation for former railway shareholders on the valuation of their shares in 1946 (when the whole railway infrastructure was in a run-down and dilapidated state because of war damage and minimal maintenance) the railways were acquired comparatively cheaply.

However, others point out that three of the Big Four were effectively bankrupt before the onset of war in 1939. They were only saved from the ignominy of actually declaring bankruptcy by the guaranteed income provided by the wartime government and the temporary surge in rail traffic caused by the restrictions on other forms of transport during and immediately after the war. The exchange of potentially worthless private stock for government gilts based on a valuation during an artificially created boom could thus be considered a good deal.

Despite nationalisation and the creation of British Railways (BR), the rail system changed little and was left in much the same way as it had been before. BR was divided into six administrative regions: Eastern, London Midland, North Eastern, Scottish, Southern and Western.

These closely mirrored the regions covered by the former companies in England and Wales, although with the addition of a separate Scottish Region. The North Eastern Region was eventually amalgamated with the Eastern Region, reflecting the English operations of the 1923–1947 London and North Eastern Railway.

== Inland waterways ==
Several canal and river navigation undertakings were transferred to the British Transport Commission by the act:

- Undertakers of the Aire and Calder Navigation
- Sheffield and South Yorkshire Navigation Company
- Aire and Calder and River Dun Navigations Joint Committee
- Company of Proprietors of the Birmingham Canal Navigations
- Company of Proprietors of the Calder and Hebble Navigation
- Company of Proprietors of the Coventry Canal Navigation
- Grand Union Canal Company
- Leeds and Liverpool Canal Company
- Lee Conservancy Board
- The Lord Mayor, Aldermen and Citizens of the City of Nottingham (in respect of the Trent Navigation undertaking).
- Oxford Canal Company
- Severn Commissioners
- Sharpness Docks and Gloucester and Birmingham Navigation Company
- Staffordshire and Worcestershire Canal Company
- Company of Proprietors of the Stourbridge Navigation
- Trent Navigation Company
- Weaver Navigation Trustees
- Company of Proprietors of the Herefordshire and Gloucestershire Canal Navigation

== Subsequent developments ==
Fifteen years later, under the Transport Act 1962 (10 & 11 Eliz. 2. c. 46), Harold Macmillan's Conservative government dissolved the British Transport Commission and created the British Railways Board to take over railway duties from 1 January 1963 and the Transport Holding Company to take over their bus operations from the same date.

Section 72 and 75 of, and the tenth and eleventh schedules to, the act were repealed by section 95(1) of, and part I of the twelfth schedule to, the Transport Act 1962 (10 & 11 Eliz. 2. c. 46). Many other provisions were repealed by section 95(2) of, and part II of the twelfth schedule to, the 1962 act.
