= Transport Act 1962 =

Act of the Parliament of the United Kingdom

Transport Act 1962 (Note: Section 96(1).)
- Act of Parliament
- Parliament of the United Kingdom
- Long title: An Act to provide for the re-organisation of the nationalised transport undertakings now carried on under the Transport Act, 1947, and for that purpose to provide for the establishment of public authorities as successors to the British Transport Commission, and for the transfer to them of undertakings, parts of undertakings, property, rights, obligations and liabilities; to repeal certain enactments relating to transport charges and facilities and to amend in other respects the law relating to transport, inland waterways, harbours and port facilities; and for purposes connected with the matters aforesaid.
- Citation: 10 & 11 Eliz. 2. c. 46
- Territorial extent: United Kingdom (Note: Section 93.)

Dates
- Royal assent: 1 August 1962
- Commencement: 1 September 1962: except section 75. (Note: The Transport Act 1962 (Commencement No. 1) Order 1962 (SI 1962/1788).); 1 January 1965: section 75 (Note: The Transport Act 1962 (Commencement No. 2) Order 1964 (SI 1964/2025).)
Other legislation
Amends	Railways Clauses Consolidation Act 1845; Railways Clauses Consolidation (Scotland) Act 1845; Railways Clauses Act 1863; Regulation of Railways Act 1868; Light Railways Act 1896; Railways Act 1921; London Passenger Transport Act 1933
Repeals/revokes	Railway Regulation Act 1844; Railway (Sales and Leases) Act 1845; Abandonment of Railways Act 1850; Railway and Canal Traffic Act 1854; Railway Companies Arbitration Act 1859; Railway Companies Securities Act 1866; Abandonment of Railways Act 1869; Railways (Private Sidings) Act 1904; Chairmen of Traffic Commissioners &c. (Tenure of Office) Act 1937; Transport (Borrowing Powers) Act 1955; Transport (Disposal of Road Haulage Property) Act 1956; Transport (Railway Finances) Act 1957; Transport (Borrowing Powers) Act 1959
Amended by	Water Resources Act 1963; London Government Act 1963; Statute Law Revision (Consequential Repeals) Act 1965; General Rate Act 1967; Capital Allowances Act 1968; Theft Act 1968; National Loans Act 1968; Tribunals and Inquiries Act 1971; Statute Law (Repeals) Act 1974; House of Commons Disqualification Act 1975; Northern Ireland Assembly Disqualification Act 1975; Statute Law (Repeals) Act 1978; Highways Act 1980; Public Passenger Vehicles Act 1981; Judicial Pensions Act 1981; Animal Health Act 1981; Transport Act 1962 (Amendment) Act 1981; Acquisition of Land Act 1981; Food Act 1984; Statute Law (Repeals) Act 1993; Arbitration Act 1996; Secretary of State for the Environment, Transport and the Regions Order 1997; Greater London Authority Act 1999; Railways and Transport Safety Act 2003; Regulatory Reform (British Waterways Board) Order 2003; Transport for London (Consequential Provisions) Order 2003; Water Industry (Scotland) Act 2002 (Consequential Modifications) Order 2004; Constitutional Reform Act 2005; Inquiries Act 2005; Railways Act 2005; Secretary of State for Communities and Local Government Order 2006; Companies Act 2006 (Consequential Amendments etc) Order 2008; Companies Act 2006 (Consequential Amendments, Transitional Provisions and Savings) Order 2009; Arbitration (Scotland) Act 2010 (Consequential Amendments) Order 2010; Passengers' Council (Non-Railway Functions) Order 2010; Treaty of Lisbon (Changes in Terminology) Order 2011; Finance Act 2012; British Waterways Board (Transfer of Functions) Order 2012; Marriage (Same Sex Couples) Act 2013 (Consequential and Contrary Provisions and Scotland) Order 2014; Marriage and Civil Partnership (Scotland) Act 2014 and Civil Partnership Act 2004 (Consequential Provisions and Modifications) Order 2014; Office of Rail Regulation (Change of Name) Regulations 2015; Secretaries of State for Health and Social Care and for Housing, Communities and Local Government and Transfer of Functions (Commonhold Land) Order 2018; Transport (Scotland) Act 2019; Transfer of Functions (Secretary of State for Levelling Up, Housing and Communities) Order 2021; Transfer of Functions (Secretary of State for Housing, Communities and Local Government) Order 2024

Status: Amended

Text of statute as originally enacted

Revised text of statute as amended

Text of the Transport Act 1962 as in force today (including any amendments) within the United Kingdom, from legislation.gov.uk.

The Transport Act 1962 (10 & 11 Eliz. 2. c. 46) is an act of the Parliament of the United Kingdom. Described as the "most momentous piece of legislation in the field of railway law to have been enacted since the Railway and Canal Traffic Act 1854", it was passed by Harold Macmillan's Conservative government to dissolve the British Transport Commission (BTC), which had been established by Clement Attlee's Labour government in 1947 to oversee railways, canals and road freight transport. The act established the British Railways Board, which took over the BTC's railway responsibilities from 1 January 1963 until the passing of the Railways Act 1993.

The act put in place measures that enabled the closure of around a third of British railways the following year as a result of the Beeching report, as the act simplified the process of closing railways removing the need for pros and cons of each case to be heard in detail.

== Historical context ==
By the end of 1960, British Railways had accumulated a deficit of some £500 million and the annual rate of increase of the deficit was estimated to be in the region of £100 million. The act sought primarily to remedy this situation by putting public transport operators on the same footing as private companies, reversing the policy that had been in place since the earliest days of transport law, namely that the carrier was a monopolist to be controlled and regulated by the State for the benefit of the public.

== Commencement ==
Section 96 of the act provided that the act would come force on a day or days appointed by the secretary of state.

Transport Act 1962 (Commencement No. 1) Order 1962 (Note: Section 2(1).)
- Statutory Instrument
- Parliament of the United Kingdom
- Citation: SI 1962/1788
- Territorial extent: United Kingdom

Dates
- Made: 14 August 1962

Status: Current legislation

Text of statute as originally enacted

Transport Act 1962 (Commencement No. 2) Order 1964 (Note: Section 2(1).)
- Statutory Instrument
- Parliament of the United Kingdom
- Citation: SI 1964/2025
- Territorial extent: United Kingdom

Dates
- Made: 18 December 1964

Status: Current legislation

Text of statute as originally enacted

The Transport Act 1962 (Commencement No. 1) Order 1962 (SI 1962/1788) provided that the whole act except section 75 of the act would come into force on 1 September 1962. The Transport Act 1962 (Commencement No. 2) Order 1964 (SI 1964/2025) provided that the section 75 of the act would come into force on 1 January 1965.

== New financial management obligations ==
By virtue of sections 36 and 38 of the act, some of the debts of the BTC, including the funds invested in the failed 1955 Modernisation Plan, were written off or transferred to the Treasury. The British Railways Board was directed, under Section 22, to run the railways so that its operating profits were "not less than sufficient" for meeting running costs.

The obligation to be self-sufficient was a departure in UK railway legislation and marked an important turning point. Each railway service should pay for itself or at least have the prospect of doing so. The days of general subsidisation of the railways were now clearly over. The change of policy was brought about by the Select committee of the House of Commons on Nationalised Industries, which concluded that the BTC should make its decisions exclusively on considerations of "direct profitability". Where decisions based "on grounds of the national economy or of social needs" needed to be taken, the Minister of Transport would be responsible, having sought the approval of Parliament.

The railways would now be operated on the principles applicable to a private entrepreneur in a competitive marketplace. In that respect, section 3(1) provides that it was the duty of the British Railways Board to provide railway services "in Great Britain" (not 'for') with regard to "efficiency, economy and safety of operation".

== Break-up of the British Transport Commission ==
To facilitate the new policy, the BTC was replaced by five new public corporations:

- the British Railways Board
- the London Transport Board
- the British Transport Docks Board
- the British Waterways Board
- the Transport Holding Company (holding the shares of companies belonging to BTC, including Thomas Cook and Son Ltd and Thomas Tilling)

The four boards inherited the property, liabilities and functions of the BTC, but their activities were to be co-ordinated by the Minister of Transport, rather than a body separate from the government. The boards needed the consent of the minister to borrow and for approval for projects involving large sums of money (sections 19 and 27).

== New advisory bodies ==
=== Nationalised Transport Advisory Council ===
Section 55 of the act created the Nationalised Transport Advisory Council to "advise" the Minister of Transport on the activities of the five corporations, which would all be represented on the council.

=== Transport consultative committees ===
The Central Transport Consultative Committee took the place of a similar body that had been created under the Transport Act 1947 to represent users of the railway, and area transport users consultative committees covered individual areas of the country.

The committees were to make recommendations relating to the services provided by the four boards, although their remit did not include the charges and fares. The Minister was not bound to follow any recommendations.

== Procedure for closure of railway lines ==
A new procedure was set out for the closure of railway lines, Section 56(7) requiring that British Railways gave at least six weeks' notice of their intention to close a line and to publish this proposal in two successive weeks in two local newspapers in the area affected. The notice would give the proposed closure dates, details of alternative transport services (including services which BR was to lay on as a result of closure) and inviting objections to a specified address. A copy of the notice was to be sent to the relevant area committee.

Rail users affected by a closure could also send their objections to the area committee (this was not required to be specified in the closure notice) who would then report to the Minister of Transport. The area committee would consider the "hardship" which it considered would be caused as a result of the closure, and recommend measures to ease that hardship. The closure would not then be proceeded with until the committee had reported to the minister and he had given his consent to the closure. Based on the report, the minister could subject his consent to closure to certain conditions, such as the provision of alternative transport services.

== Reform of the law of transport ==
The four boards were placed in the position of private companies in respect of their commercial activities. They no longer had the status of common carrier transporting persons and goods for the public benefit, but were now bailees transporting goods and people like a private operator.

The main effect of this change was that the boards were no longer "absolutely liable" for their operations, i.e. bearing responsibility for loss even in the absence of negligence or fault on their part. Now they could restrict their liabilities in a similar fashion to private operators.

A consequence was that they could reject passenger and goods consignments and limit the exposure of their liability, and were free to "demand, take and recover such charges for their services and facilities, and to make the use of those services and facilities subject to such terms and conditions as they think fit" (Section 43), i.e. have total freedom of contract to sell their services, rather than operate via the medium of a statutory process. An exception was made for the London Passenger Transport Area where fares were still fixed by the Transport Tribunal.

As one commentator noted, "the Act goes much further in giving effect to laissez-faire in the law of transport than English law has ever done at any time since the seventeenth century".

== Railway byelaws ==
Section 67 of the act enables byelaws regulating the use of the railways to be issued. This provision featured in Boddington v British Transport Police (1998) where the House of Lords recognised the principle that a defendant in criminal proceedings, in this case fined £10 for smoking on a train in violation of a railway byelaw, could challenge the validity of the rule before a court, save where Parliament has indicated that such a challenge is not possible.

== Current status ==
Much of the act has been repealed and updated: further information can be found by searching for the act in the UK Statute Law Database.

== See also ==
- Beeching Axe
- Canals of the United Kingdom
- History of the British canal system
