= Sunday Observance Act =

Sunday Observance Act may refer to

- The Sunday Observance Act 1625, an Act of the Parliament of England
- The Sunday Observance Act 1627, an Act of the Parliament of England
- The Sunday Observance Act 1677, an Act of the Parliament of England
- The Sunday Observance Act 1695, an Act of the Parliament of Ireland
- The Sunday Observance Act 1780, an Act of the Parliament of Great Britain
