= 1489 =

1489 in various calendars
- Gregorian calendar: 1489; MCDLXXXIX
- Ab urbe condita: 2242
- Armenian calendar: 938; ԹՎ ՋԼԸ
- Assyrian calendar: 6239
- Balinese saka calendar: 1410–1411
- Bengali calendar: 895–896
- Berber calendar: 2439
- English Regnal year: 4 Hen. 7 – 5 Hen. 7
- Buddhist calendar: 2033
- Burmese calendar: 851
- Byzantine calendar: 6997–6998
- Chinese calendar: 戊申年 (Earth Monkey); 4186 or 3979 — to — 己酉年 (Earth Rooster); 4187 or 3980
- Coptic calendar: 1205–1206
- Discordian calendar: 2655
- Ethiopian calendar: 1481–1482
- Hebrew calendar: 5249–5250
- Hindu calendars
- Vikram Samvat: 1545–1546
- Shaka Samvat: 1410–1411
- Kali Yuga: 4589–4590
- Holocene calendar: 11489
- Igbo calendar: 489–490
- Iranian calendar: 867–868
- Islamic calendar: 894–895
- Japanese calendar: Chōkyō 3 / Entoku 1 (延徳元年)
- Javanese calendar: 1405–1406
- Julian calendar: 1489; MCDLXXXIX
- Korean calendar: 3822
- Minguo calendar: 423 before ROC 民前423年
- Nanakshahi calendar: 21
- Thai solar calendar: 2031–2032
- Tibetan calendar: ས་ཕོ་སྤྲེ་ལོ་ (male Earth-Monkey); 1615 or 1234 or 462 — to — ས་མོ་བྱ་ལོ་ (female Earth-Bird); 1616 or 1235 or 463

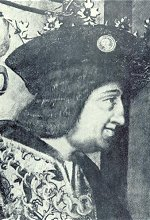
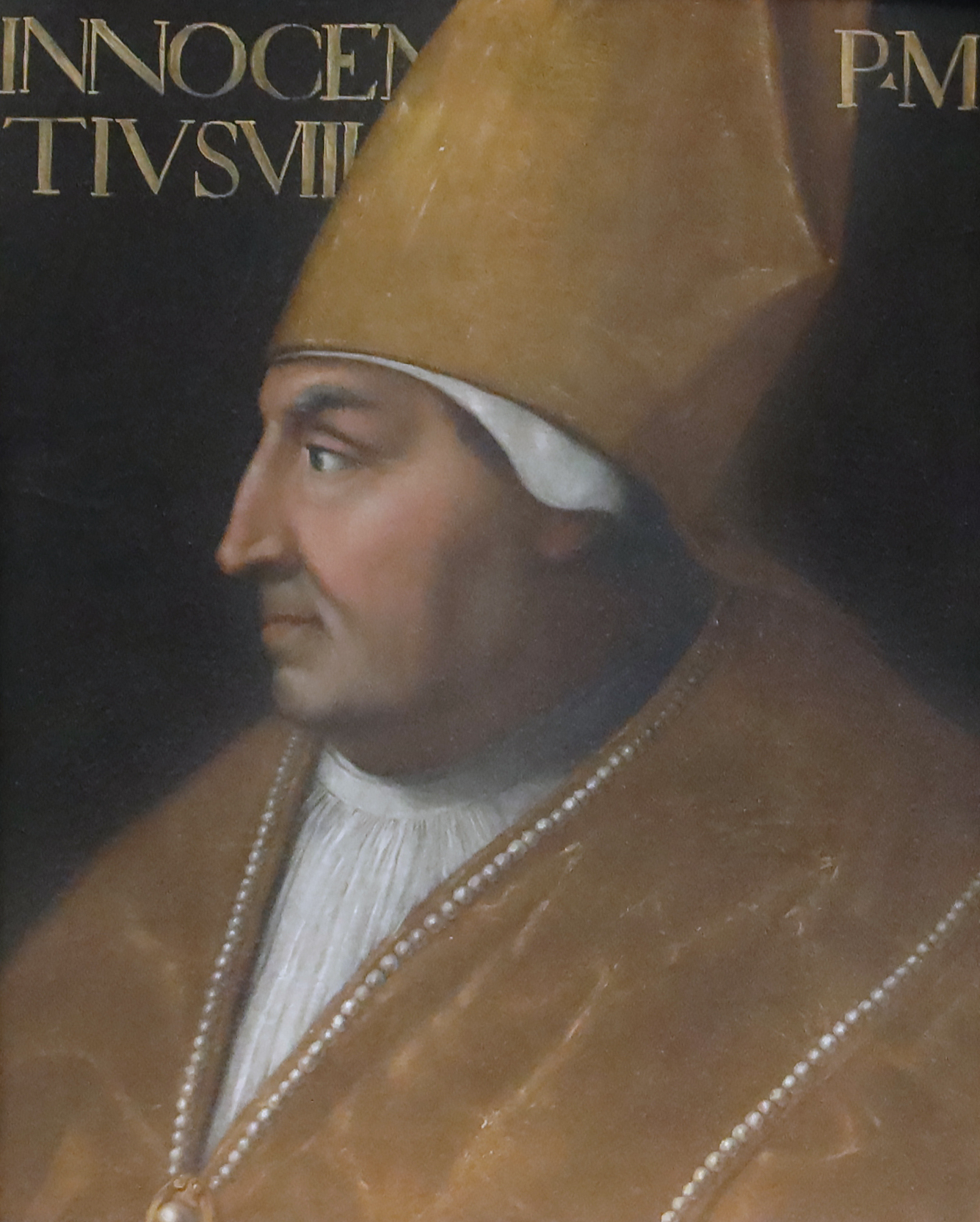
September 1: King Ferdinand I of Naples is excommunicated by Pope Innocent VIII, but ignores the Pope's order declaring the throne vacant.

Year 1489 (MCDLXXXIX) was a common year starting on Thursday of the Julian calendar.

== Events ==
=== January–March ===
- January 3 – Johann von Tiefen becomes the new Grand Master of the Teutonic Order upon the death of Martin von Wetzhausen.
- January 13 – The English Parliament opens at Westminster, with Thomas Fitzwilliam as the Speaker of the House of Commons. The day after its opening, the Treason Act 1488 and the Collusive Actions Act 1488 go into effect on resolution of the English Parliament.
- February 2 – Isabella of Aragon, daughter of King Alfonso II of Naples, marries Gian Galeazzo Sforza, Duke of Milan, as part of a closer alliance of Naples and Milan in Italy.
- February 10 – The Treaty of Redon is signed between the Duchy of Brittany and the Kingdom of England, with an agreement approved by King Henry VII for England to provide 6,000 soldiers, with the expense to be paid by Brittany.
- February 11 – Maximilian of Austria begins the siege of Rotterdam, reclaiming Holland's capital three months after the Burgundian Netherlands city had been captured in the Holland civil war by the Hoek rebels.
- February 14 – Two alliance agreements are signed in the Austrian city of Dordrecht, with the Archduchy of Austria allying against France, with the Spanish Kingdom of Castile and the Kingdom of England. The tripartite agreement is completed with Castile and England reaching a mutual treaty on March 26.

=== April–June ===
- March 14 – The Queen of Cyprus, Catherine Cornaro, sells her kingdom to the Republic of Venice.
- March 26 – The Treaty of Medina del Campo is signed between England and the Spanish kingdom of Castile and Aragon, and includes provision for a marriage of King Henry's son and heir apparent Arthur, Prince of Wales, and Isabella's daughter Catherine of Aragon.
- April 6 – At Jodhpur, in what is now the state of Rajasthan in India, Rao Satal becomes the new ruler of the Kingdom of Marwar upon the death of his father, King Rao Jodha.
- April 28 – Henry Percy, 4th Earl of Northumberland, is killed in the village of South Kilvington in Yorkshire while meeting with John à Chambre in an attempt to stop the Yorkshire rebellion of 1489, which had started over King Henry VII's raising of taxes in Northumberland and Yorkshire.
- May 1 – Italian painter Cima da Conegliano completes his painting Madonna and Child with Saints Giacomo and Girolamo.
- May 28 – Gerontius, Metropolitan of Moscow and leader of the Russian Orthodox Church, dies after a reign of almost 16 years. The office will remain vacant for 16 months until the election of Zosimus the Bearded on September 26, 1490.
- June 4 – Squire Francis War: The Battle of the Lek is fought between ships on the Lek river in the Burgundian Netherlands, near Utrecht, between the Hoek rebels (led by Jan van Naaldwijk) and the Cods, the ruling nobility of Burgundian Holland. The 1,400 Hoek warriors suffer 250 deaths, with 400 taken prisoner and van Nalldwijk and the remaining warriors retreating.
- June 29 – King James IV grants Andrew, Lord Gray, the lands and Barony of Lundie in Scotland.

=== July–September ===
- July 4 – King James IV of Scotland gives royal assent to numerous acts passed by the Scottish Parliament, including the Siege of Castles held by Rebels Act 1489, and the renewal of alliances with France and Denmark.
- July 17 – In India's Delhi Sultanate, Sikandar Lodi succeeds Bahlul Khan Lodi as the new Sultan of Delhi.
- August 27 – In Morocco, Portugal's fortress at Graciosa falls to the troops of the Moroccan Sultan Muhammad al-Wattasi after a six week siege.

=== September–December ===
- September 1 – King Ferdinand I of Naples is excommunicated from the Roman Catholic Church and declared deposed from office by a bull issued by Pope Innocent VIII. King Ferdinand, who had been punished for refusing to pay dues to the Pope, disregards the papal order and rules over Naples for the rest of his life.
- October 2 – The Rorschacher Klosterbruch, a civil war in Switzerland, comes to an end after three months when the Abbey of Saint Gall (in the canton of St. Gallen) signs a peace with the canton of Appenzell.
- November 2 – After years of conquests within Central Europe, King Matthias Corvinus of Hungary and his army are routed at the battle of Uherský Brod and forced to retreat to Hungary
- November 29 – Arthur Tudor, heir apparent to the throne of England as the son of King Henry VII, is named Prince of Wales.
- December 3 – Austria and France agree to make a treaty to end the hostilities between the two nations. The Peace of Frankfurt is formally signed on July 22, 1490.
- December 11 – Jeannetto de Tassis is appointed Chief Master of Postal Services in Innsbruck; his descendants, the Thurn und Taxis family, later run much of the postal system of Europe.

=== Date unknown ===
- Typhus first appears in Europe, during the Siege of Baza in the Granada War.
- A gold coin equal to one pound sterling, called a sovereign, is issued for Henry VII of England.
- King Henry VII of England gives a town charter to the port of Southwold.
- Lucas Watzenrode becomes bishop of Warmia.
- Johannes Widmann publishes his mercantile arithmetic Behende und hüpsche Rechenung auff allen Kauffmanschafft in Leipzig, containing the first printed use of plus and minus signs, to indicate trading surpluses or shortages.

== Births ==
- February 9 – Georg Hartmann, German instrument maker (d. 1564)
- June 2 – Charles, Duke of Vendôme, French noble (d. 1537)
- June 4 – Antoine, Duke of Lorraine (d. 1544)
- June 16 – Sibylle of Bavaria, Electress Palatine consort (d. 1519)
- June 23 – Duke Charles II of Savoy, Italian sovereign (d. 1496)
- July 2 – Thomas Cranmer, Archbishop of Canterbury (d. 1556)
- August – Antonio da Correggio, Italian painter (d. 1534)
- August 10 – Jacob Sturm von Sturmeck, German statesman and reformer (d. 1553)
- November 10 – Henry V, Duke of Brunswick-Lüneburg and Prince of Wolfenbüttel 1514–1568 (d. 1568)
- November 28 – Margaret Tudor, Scottish regent, Queen of James IV of Scotland, daughter of Henry VII of England (d. 1541)
- December 10 – Gaston of Foix, Duke of Nemours (d. 1512)
- date unknown
  - Gerónimo de Aguilar, Spanish Franciscan friar, participant in the Spanish conquest of the Aztec Empire (d. 1531)
  - William Farel, French evangelist (d. 1565)
  - Francesco Ferruccio, Florentine captain (k. 1530)
  - Hosokawa Sumimoto, Japanese warlord (d. 1520)
  - Margareta von Melen, Swedish noblewoman (d. 1541)
  - Tsukahara Bokuden, Japanese swordsman (d. 1571)
- probable
  - Juan de Grijalva, Spanish conquistador (d. 1527)
  - Thomas Müntzer, German pastor and rebel leader (d. 1525)

== Deaths ==
- January 3 – Martin Truchseß von Wetzhausen, Grand Master of the Teutonic Knights (b. 1435)
- February 14 – Nicolaus von Tüngen, bishop of Warmia
- March 27 – Gilbert Kennedy, 1st Lord Kennedy, Scottish noble (b. 1405)
- April 6 – Jodha of Mandore, Ruler of Marwar (b. 1416)
- April 26 – Ashikaga Yoshihisa, Japanese shōgun (b. 1465)
- April 28 – Henry Percy, 4th Earl of Northumberland (b. c. 1449)
- May 3 – Stanisław Kazimierczyk, Polish canon regular and saint (b. 1433)
- May 21 – Henry V of Rosenberg, Bohemian nobleman (b. 1456)
- July 12 – Bahlul Lodi, sultan of Delhi
- July 19 – Louis I, Count Palatine of Zweibrücken (b. 1424)
- date unknown
  - Gerontius, Metropolitan of Moscow, Russian bishop
  - María de Ajofrín, Spanish visionary (b. 1455)
  - Girindrawardhana, ruler of Majapahit
