= Justices of the Peace Act 1949 =

Act of the Parliament of the United Kingdom

Justices of the Peace Act 1949 (Note: Section 46(1).)
- Act of Parliament
- Parliament of the United Kingdom
- Long title: An Act to amend the law relating to justices of the peace.
- Citation: 12, 13 & 14 Geo. 6. c. 101
- Territorial extent: England and Wales; Scotland; (Note: Section 46(3).)

Dates
- Royal assent: 16 December 1949
- Commencement: Various (Note: Section 45.)
- Repealed: Scotland: 16 May 1975; [[[England and Wales]]: 31 January 2013
Other legislation
Amends	See § Repealed enactments
Repeals/revokes	See § Repealed enactments
Amended by	Statute Law Revision Act 1953; Solicitors Act 1957; Justices of the Peace Act 1965; Justices of the Peace Act 1968; Criminal Justice Act 1972; Powers of Criminal Courts Act 1973; Solicitors Act 1974; Administration of Justice Act 1977; Statute Law (Repeals) Act 1978; Justices of the Peace Act 1979; Magistrates' Courts Act 1980; Statute Law (Repeals) Act 1989
Repealed by	District Courts (Scotland) Act 1975; England and Wales: Statute Law (Repeals) Act 2013

Status: Repealed

Text of statute as originally enacted

Revised text of statute as amended

The Justices of the Peace Act 1949 (12, 13 & 14 Geo. 6. c. 101) was an act of the Parliament of the United Kingdom that amended the law relating to justices of the peace in England and Wales and Scotland.

== Provisions ==
=== Repealed enactments ===
Section 46(2) of the act repealed 169 enactments, listed in parts I, II and III of the seventh schedule to the act.

Part I — Repeals Consequential on Part I of Act
Citation	Short title	Description	Extent of repeal
2 Hen. 5. st. 2. c. 1	Qualifications of justices of the peace	Justices of the peace shall be appointed from the residents.	The whole act.
25 & 26 Vict. c. 61	Highways Act 1862	The Highways Act, 1862	Section thirty-eight,
38 & 39 Vict. c. 55	Public Health Act 1875	The Public Health Act, 1875.	In section two hundred and fifty-eight the words “ by reason of his being a member of any local authority or”.
45 & 46 Vict. c. 50	Municipal Corporations Act 1882	The Municipal Corporations Act, 1882.	Subsection (3) of section one hundred and fifty-seven.
6 Edw. 7. c. 16	Justices of the Peace Act 1906	The Justices of the Peace Act, 1906.	Sections two and five and paragraph (a) of subsection (1) of section six.
13 & 14 Geo. 5. c. 16	Salmon and Freshwater Fisheries Act 1923	The Salmon and Fresh- water Fisheries Act, 1923.	In section seventy-six, the words “ a member of a fishery board or”.
22 & 23 Geo. 5. c. 37	Solicitors Act 1932	The Solicitors Act, 1932	Section fifty-four.
23 & 24 Geo. 5. c. 51	Local Government Act 1933	The Local Government Act, 1933.	In section eighteen, in sub-section (7) the words, from the first “ and ” to “ ceases to be mayor” and in subsection (8) the words “ in addition ”.
26 Geo. 5 & 1 Edw. 8. c. 50	Public Health (London) Act 1936	The Public Health (London) Act, 1936.	In subsection (1) of section two hundred and eighty-three the words “ by reason of his being a member of a sanitary authority or” as respects justices of the peace being members of an authority referred to in section three of this Act.
4 & 5 Geo. 6. c. 27	Justices (Supplemental List) Act 1941	The Justices (Supplemental List) Act, 1941.	The whole act.

Part II — Repeals of Procedural Provisions
Citation	Short title	Extent of repeal
2 & 3 Vict. c. 71	Metropolitan Police Courts Act 1839	Section sixteen.
32 & 33 Vict. c. 62	Debtors Act 1869	Section ten as respects courts of summary jurisdiction.
36 & 37 Vict. c. 9	Bastardy Laws Amendment Act 1873	Section six.
38 & 39 Vict. c. 90	Employers and Workmen Act 1875	The concluding paragraph of section eight as respects courts of summary jurisdiction; and the concluding paragraph of section nine.
42 & 43 Vict. c. 49	Summary Jurisdiction Act 1879	Section twenty-nine.
47 & 48 Vict. c. 43	Summary Jurisdiction Act 1884	Section twelve.
7 Edw. 7. c. 32	Dogs Act 1906	In subsection (1), of section five, the words “in England by rules made by the Lord Chancellor and ”
3 & 4 Geo. 5. c. 28	Mental Deficiency Act 1913	Subsection (5) of section forty-four.
4 & 5 Geo. 5. c. 6	Affiliation Orders Act 1914	Section six.
4 & 5 Geo. 5. c. 58	Criminal Justice Administration Act 1914	Subsection (2) of section three; subsection (1) of section forty.
10 & 11 Geo. 5. c. 33	Maintenance Orders (Facilities for Enforcement) Act 1920	Section seven from “ and” onwards.
15 & 16 Geo. 5. c. 45	Guardianship of Infants Act 1925	Subsection (2) of section seven.
15 & 16 Geo. 5. c. 86	Criminal Justice Act 1925	In subsections (4) and (7) of section twelve, the words “made under this Act”; section seventeen.
16 & 17 Geo. 5. c. 29	Adoption of Children Act 1926	Subsection (2) of section eight as respects courts of summary jurisdiction.
17 & 18 Geo. 5. c. 21	Moneylenders Act 1927	Subsection (5) of section two.
23 & 24 Geo. 5. c. 12	Children and Young Persons Act 1933	Subsection (3) of section thirty-four; subsection (3) of section forty-six; subsection (3) of section forty-seven; in section one hundred and one subsection (1) from “ and the power” onwards and subsection (2); sub-paragraph (4) of paragraph 1 of the Second Schedule.
23 & 24 Geo. 5. c. 42	Service of Process (Justices) Act 1933	In subsection (2) of section three the definition of “ prescribed ”.
25 & 26 Geo. 5. c. 46	Money Payments (Justices Procedure) Act 1935	Section fourteen.
26 Geo. 5 & 1 Edw. 8. c. 50	Public Health (London) Act 1936	Section two hundred and seventy from “ and the power ” onwards.
1 Edw. 8 & 1 Geo. 6. c. 58	Summary Procedure (Domestic Proceedings) Act 1937	In subsection (1) of section four the words “by rules made by the Lord Chancellor under this section ”.
11 & 12 Geo. 6. c. 29	National Assistance Act 1948	Subsection (9) of section forty-four.
11 & 12 Geo. 6. c. 43	Children Act 1948	Subsection (7) of section twenty-six.
11 & 12 Geo. 6. c. 58	Criminal Justice Act 1948	Subsection (6) of section nineteen.

Part III — Miscellaneous Repeals
Citation	Short title	Description	Extent of repeal
27 Hen. 8. c. 24	Jurisdiction in Liberties Act 1535	The Jurisdiction in Liberties Act, 1535.	Sections two, four, five and, so far as they relate to justices of the peace, fourteen and fifteen.
34 & 35 Hen. 8. c. 26	Laws in Wales Acts 1535–1542	The Laws in Wales Act, 1542.	In section twenty-one the words “There shall be justices of peace and also one custos rotulorum in every of the said twelve shires ” and the word “ said ”.
14 Eliz. c. 13	Hexhamshire Act 1572	An Act for the annexing of Hexam and Hexam-shire to the county of Northumberland.	The words “ justices of peace ”.
1 Car. 1. c. 1	Sunday Observance Act 1625	The Sunday Observance Act, 1625.	The words “ the same to be employed and converted to the use of the poor of the parish where such offence shall be committed ”.
3 Car. 1. c. 2	Sunday Observance Act 1627	The Sunday Observance Act, 1627.	The words from “ All which forfeitures ” to “ forfeiture ”.
29 Car. 2. c. 7	Sunday Observance Act 1677	The Sunday Observance Act, 1677.	Section two from “ and all and singular ” onwards.
11 Geo. 2. c. 19	Distress for Rent Act 1737	The Distress for Rent Act, 1737.	In section four, the words “ to such landlord or landlords, his, her, or their bailiffs, servant or agent”.
15 Geo. 2. c. 33	Starr and Bent Act 1741	The Starr and Bent Act, 1741.	In sections six and seven, the words from “ one moiety ” onwards.
19 Geo. 2. c. 21	Profane Oaths Act 1745	The Profane Oaths Act, 1745.	In section seven, the words from “ to be disposed of” to “ committed ”; sections nine and ten.
17 Geo. 3. c. 56	Frauds by Workmen Act 1777	The Frauds by Workmen Act, 1777.	In section three the words from “ every such pecuniary penalty ” to “ and then ” and from “ and afterwards ” to “ appoint”.
32 Geo. 3. c. 56	Servants' Characters Act 1792	The Servants' Characters Act, 1792.	In section six the words from “ one moiety” to “ committed ”.
33 Geo. 3. c. 55	Parish Officers Act 1793	The Parish Officers Act, 1793.	Section one from the words “ and such fine ” where they first occur to the words “ imposing the same ”.
35 Geo. 3. c. 113	Sale of Beer Act 1795	The Sale of Beer Act, 1795.	Section five to the word “ appoint ”; section ten from “ and such penalty” onwards.
39 Geo. 3. c. 79	Unlawful Societies Act 1799	The Unlawful Societies Act, 1799.	In section thirty-six, the words “ or the informer before any justice ”.
51 Geo. 3. c. 36	Cinque Ports Act 1811	The Cinque Ports Act, 1811.	Sections one to five and section eight.
57 Geo. 3. c. 19	Seditious Meetings Act 1817	The Seditious Meetings Act, 1817.	In section thirty-one, the words “ or to the informer before any justice ”.
9 Geo. 4. c. 43	Division of Counties Act 1828	The Division of Counties Act, 1828.	The whole act.
10 Geo. 4. c. 44	Metropolitan Police Act 1829	The Metropolitan Police Act, 1829.	Section thirty-seven.
11 Geo. 4 & 1 Will. 4. c. 64	Beerhouse Act 1830	The Beerhouse Act, 1830	Section twenty-four from the words “ or either ” onwards.
1 & 2 Will. 4. c. 32	Game Act 1831	The Game Act, 1831.	Section thirty-seven.
1 & 2 Will. 4. c. 41	Special Constables Act 1831	The Special Constables Act, 1831.	Section fifteen from “and every ” onwards.
5 & 6 Will. 4. c. 50	Highways Act 1835	The Highways Act, 1835	Section one hundred and three, from “and the penalties” onwards.
6 & 7 Will. 4. c. 12	Petty Sessional Divisions Act 1836	The Petty Sessional Divisions Act, 1836.	The whole act.
6 & 7 Will. 4. c. 87	Liberties Act 1836	The Liberties Act, 1836	Section two so far as it provides for any place to be a liberty for the purpose of justices and sections three, six, seven and nine to eleven.
2 & 3 Vict. c. 15	Staffordshire Potteries Stipendiary Justice Act 1839	The Staffordshire Potteries Stipendiary Justice Act, 1839.	In section six, the words from “ at the rate ” to “ year ”; in section seven, the words from “ or sum ” where first occurring to “ or sum ” where next occurring; section nine from “and the said clerk” onwards.
2 & 3 Vict. c. 47	Metropolitan Police Act 1839	The Metropolitan Police Act, 1839.	In section seventy-seven, the words from “ and so much ” to “ conviction ” where first occurring and from “ and the residue ” onwards.
2 & 3 Vict. c. 71	Metropolitan Police Courts Act 1839	The Metropolitan Police Courts Act, 1839.	In section three the words from “ each ” to “ bar ”; section thirty-four; section forty-two; section forty-six; section forty-seven.
2 & 3 Vict. c. 82	Counties (Detached Parts) Act 1839	The Counties (Detached Parts) Act, 1839.	Section three.
2 & 3 Vict. c. xciv	City of London Police Act 1839	An Act for regulating the police in the City of London.	In section thirty-two the words from “ and upon conviction ” to “ of this Act ” as respects convictions before a court of summary jurisdiction; and as respects penalties imposed by such a court, in section ninety-seven the words from “ all which penalties ” to “ of this Act”.
5 & 6 Vict. c. 44	Licensing Act 1842	The Licensing Act, 1842	Section five from “and such penalty ” onwards.
5 & 6 Vict. c. 110	Coventry Act 1842	An Act to annex the “ county of the City of Coventry to Warwickshire, and to define the boundary of the City of Coventry.	The first proviso to section one; section seven; in section ten the words “ and no recorder”.
6 & 7 Vict. c. 30	Pound-breach Act 1843	The Pound-breach Act, 1843.	Section one from “ and it” onwards.
6 & 7 Vict. c. 40	Hosiery Act 1843	The Hosiery Act, 1843	In section twenty the words from “to be applied” to “ if any ”.
6 & 7 Vict. c. 68	Theatres Act 1843	The Theatres Act, 1843	In section five the words from “and every” onwards; in section twenty-one the words from the first “ shall ” to “ if any ” as respects penalties imposed by courts of summary jurisdiction.
6 & 7 Vict. c. xliv	Merthyr Tydfil Justices of the Peace Act 1843	An Act to provide for the more effectual execution of the office of a justice of the peace within the parish of Merthyr Tydfil and certain adjoining parishes.	Sections eight, thirteen and fourteen.
7 & 8 Vict. c. 61	Counties (Detached Parts) Act 1844	The Counties (Detached Parts) Act, 1844.	Section three.
8 & 9 Vict. c. 16	Companies Clauses Act 1845	The Companies Clauses Act, 1845.	Section one hundred and fifty-two.
8 & 9 Vict. c. 20	Railways Clauses Consolidation Act 1845	The Railways Clauses Consolidation Act, 1845.	Section twenty-three from “ and ” onwards; in section fifty-seven, the words from “ to the trustees ” to “ thereof ”; in section fifty-eight, the words from “ and such penalty ” to “ owner thereof”; in section sixty-four the words “ to the said commissioners, or trustees, or surveyor ”; in sections eighty-four, ninety-nine, one hundred and three, one hundred and five, one hundred and sixteen and one hundred and nineteen, the words “ to the company ”; section one hundred and fifty; in section one hundred and fifty-nine the words from “ and except” to “ be applied” and the words “ paid and applied ”.
8 & 9 Vict. c. 118	Inclosure Act 1845	The Inclosure Act, 1845	Section one hundred and fifty-nine from “ all which ” onwards.
10 & 11 Vict. c. 14	Markets and Fairs Clauses Act 1847	The Markets and Fairs Clauses Act, 1847.	In section twenty-six the words “ to the person requiring such cart to be weighed”; in section fifty-six the words from “ and except” to “ be applied ” and the words “paid and applied ”.
10 & 11 Vict. c. 16	Commissioners Clauses Act 1847	The Commissioners Clauses Act, 1847.	In section one hundred and six the words from “ and except” to “ be applied” and the words “ paid and applied ”.
10 & 11 Vict. c. 27	Harbours, Docks and Piers Clauses Act 1847	The Harbours, Docks and Piers Clauses Act, 1847.	In section ninety-five the words from “and except” to “be applied ” and the words “paid and applied ”.
10 & 11 Vict. c. 34	Towns Improvement Clauses Act 1847	The Towns Improvement Clauses Act, 1847.	In section thirty the words “ to the commissioners ”.
10 & 11 Vict. c. 65	Cemeteries Clauses Act 1847	The Cemeteries Clauses Act, 1847.	In sections fifty-eight and fifty-nine the words “ to the company ”.
11 & 12 Vict. c. 43	Summary Jurisdiction Act 1848	The Summary Jurisdiction Act, 1848.	In section thirty-one the words from “ according to the ” to “ every such clerk ” and the words from “ and the said clerk” onwards.
11 & 12 Vict. c. 99	Inclosure Act 1848	The Inclosure Act, 1848.	Section ten from “and such sum ” onwards.
12 & 13 Vict. c. 18	Petty Sessions Act 1849	The Petty Sessions Act, 1849.	Sections two and three.
12 & 13 Vict. c. 83	Inclosure Act 1849	The Inclosure Act, 1849.	Section ten from the words “ and such sum ” to the word “ direct ” where next occurring.
13 & 14 Vict. c. 105	Liberties Act 1850	The Liberties Act, 1850	In section one, the words “ to the justices of any liberty, or”; in section two, the words from “ and shall also ” to “ advertised and given”, the words “ or liberty ” in both places, the words “custos rotulorum” and the words “clerk of the peace” where last occurring; in section three, the words from “ as well” to “ therein ”; section four from “ and shall” onwards; sections six and seven.
14 & 15 Vict. c. 55	Criminal Justice Administration Act 1851	The Criminal Justice Administration Act, 1851.	In their application to justices' clerks, sections ten and eleven and in section twelve the words “by virtue of any order made under this Act ”, the words “ under this Act ” where next occurring and the words from “ and in every such case ” onwards.
15 & 16 Vict. c. 79	Inclosure Act 1852	The Inclosure Act, 1852	Section thirty-three from the words “ and such sum ” to the words “regulated pastures ”.
16 & 17 Vict. c. 119	Betting Act 1853	The Betting Act, 1853.	Section nine.
17 & 18 Vict. c. 38	Gaming Houses Act 1854	The Gaming Houses Act, 1854.	Section eight.
18 & 19 Vict. c. 48	Cinque Ports Act 1855	The Cinque Ports Act, 1855.	Sections three to eight.
20 & 21 Vict. c. 1	Cinque Ports Act 1857	The Cinque Ports Act, 1857.	The whole act.
21 & 22 Vict. c. 73	Stipendiary Magistrates Act 1858	The Stipendiary Magistrates Act. 1858.	Section fourteen.
22 & 23 Vict. c. 65	Petty Sessional Divisions Act 1859	The Petty Sessional Divisions Act, 1859.	The whole act.
24 & 25 Vict. c. 110	Old Metal Dealers Act 1861	The Old Metal Dealers Act, 1861.	Section ten from “ or to be applied ” onwards.
26 & 27 Vict. c. 97	Stipendiary Magistrates Act 1863	The Stipendiary Magistrates Act, 1863.	The whole act.
28 & 29 Vict. c. 37	County of Sussex Act 1865	The County of Sussex Act, 1865.	Sections four to eight and section eleven.
28 & 29 Vict. c. 103	Falmouth Gaol Discontinuance Act 1865	The Falmouth Gaol Discontinuance Act, 1865.	The whole act.
30 & 31 Vict. c. 63	Chatham and Sheerness Stipendiary Magistrate Act 1867	The Chatham and Sheerness Stipendiary Magistrate Act, 1867.	The whole act.
30 & 31 Vict. c. 115	Justices of the Peace Act 1867	The Justices of the Peace Act, 1867.	In section two the words “petty or special or ”.
30 & 31 Vict. c. 124	Merchant Shipping Act 1867	The Merchant Shipping Act. 1867.	The whole act.
31 & 32 Vict. c. 22	Petty Sessions and Lock-up House Act 1868	The Petty Sessions and Lock-up House Act, 1868.	In section three, the definitions of “ petty sessions ” and “ quarter sessions ”; sections four and five; section eight to “ respectively; and ”; paragraph 2 in section ten.
31 & 32 Vict. c. 119	Regulation of Railways Act 1868	The Regulation of Railways Act, 1868.	In section twenty-one the words from “ one half” to “ rate ”.
31 & 32 Vict. c. xxxvi	Merthyr Tydfil Stipendiary Magistrate Act 1868	An Act to extend the limits of the Act for appointing a stipendiary justice of the peace for the parish of Merthyr Tydfil and adjoining places; and for other purposes.	Section six.
32 & 33 Vict. c. 34	Stipendiary Magistrates Act 1869	The Stipendiary Magistrates Act, 1869.	In section two, the words from “ who ” to “ years ” and the words “ qualified as aforesaid”.
32 & 33 Vict. c. 49	Local Stamp Act 1869	The Local Stamp Act, 1869	The whole act.
32 & 33 Vict. c. 53	Cinque Ports Act 1869	The Cinque Ports Act, 1869.	The whole act.
34 & 35 Vict. c. xc	Staffordshire Potteries Stipendiary Justice Act 1871	The Staffordshire Potteries Stipendiary Justice Act, 1871.	Section fifteen; section twenty to “ Provided always that” and from “ Provided also ” onwards, except as respects the magistrate holding office at the coming into force of this repeal; section twenty-one from the beginning to the words “pounds and”; section thirty.
35 & 36 Vict. c. 93	Pawnbrokers Act 1872	The Pawnbrokers Act, 1872.	The second paragraph of section thirty-three, except so far as it enables the court to direct any sum to be applied in making satisfaction to the party injured; in section thirty-five the words from “ which forfeiture ” to “thereof”; section forty-six, so far as it enables a court of summary jurisdiction to direct payment to a complainant who is not the party aggrieved.
37 & 38 Vict. c. 45	County of Hertford and Liberty of St. Alban Act 1874	The County of Hertford and Liberty of St. Alban Act, 1874.	Section six.
38 & 39 Vict. c. 55	Public Health Act 1875	The Public Health Act, 1875.	In section twenty-six the words “ to the urban authority ”; section two hundred and fifty-four.
39 & 40 Vict. c. 20	Statute Law Revision (Substituted Enactments) Act 1876	The Statute Law Revision (Substituted Enactments) Act, 1876.	Section one from the first “ that” to “ and ” where next occurring.
40 & 41 Vict. c. 43	Justices Clerks Act 1877	The Justices Clerks Act, 1877.	Sections two to four; section five from “Provided that” onwards; and sections six, seven and nine.
41 & 42 Vict. c. 15	Customs and Inland Revenue Act 1878	The Customs and Inland Revenue Act, 1878.	In paragraph (2) of section twenty-three the words from “the benefit” to the last “ and ”.
41 & 42 Vict. c. 49	Weights and Measures Act 1878	The Weights and Measures Act, 1878.	In section fifty-seven, paragraph 4 and paragraph 5 from “ and the proceeds” onwards.
41 & 42 Vict. c. lv	Manchester Division and Borough of Salford (Stipendiary Justices) Act 1878	The Manchester Division and Borough of Salford (Stipendiary Justices) Act, 1878.	Section thirty-seven except as respects the magistrate holding office at the coming into force of this repeal; sections thirty-nine to forty-one; section forty-two from the word “ not”, where first occurring, onwards; section forty-three except as respects a magistrate to whom subsection (1) of section thirty-three of this Act does not apply; sections forty-four and forty-five.
41 & 42 Vict. c. cxciii	Ramsgate Improvement Act 1878	The Ramsgate Improvement Act, 1878.	Sections eighteen and nineteen.
42 & 43 Vict. c. cxix	Stratford-upon-Avon Borough Act 1879	The Stratford upon Avon Borough Act, 1879.	Section seventy-eight as respects justices of the peace.
42 & 43 Vict. c. 49	Summary Jurisdiction Act 1879	The Summary Jurisdiction Act, 1879.	In section eight the words from “the court may also” onwards; paragraph (e) of subsection (1) of section twenty-nine; section thirty; in section forty-eight the words “the justices of a borough or ” and the words “ and the principal Act therein mentioned ”.
44 & 45 Vict. c. 58	Army Act 1881	The Army Act.	In section one hundred and sixty-six, subsection (3) and subsection (6) to the word “ informer ”.
45 & 46 Vict. c. 50	Municipal Corporations Act 1882	The Municipal Corporations Act, 1882.	Subsections (1), (2) and (6) of section one hundred and fifty-nine; section one hundred and sixty; section one hundred and sixty-one; section two hundred and twenty-one; in section two hundred and forty-eight, subsection (2) except in its application to the coroners of Hastings and Dover and subsections (3), (4), (6) and (7).
46 & 47 Vict. c. 18	Municipal Corporations Act 1883	The Municipal Corporations Act, 1883.	Subsection (2) of section seventeen from “and to have” onwards.
47 & 48 Vict. c. 43	Summary Jurisdiction Act 1884	The Summary Jurisdiction Act, 1884.	In section eight, the first paragraph, and in the second the words “ petty sessional courthouse or” and the words “provided or”.
51 & 52 Vict. c. 41	Local Government Act 1888	The Local Government Act, 1888.	In paragraph (iv) of section three the words “justices rooms ” and “ and the justices ”; in section thirty, in subsection (1) the words “ and of clerks of the justices ” and in subsection (3) the words “ or to clerks of the justices ”, the words “ or justices out of session ”, the words “ or the said clerks ” and the words from “or to the application of ” to ” by clerks to justices”; in section thirty-eight, paragraph (7) and in paragraph (8) the words from “ and if” to “justices ”; in subsection (12) of section forty-two the words “petty sessional or”; subsection (3) of section forty-eight; in subsection (3) of section sixty-four the words “ and justices out of sessions ” and the words “ or justices ”; in section sixty-six the words “ or justices out of session ”; paragraph (a) of proviso (16) to section seventy-five; paragraphs (7) and (8) of section eighty-three; section eighty-four; subsection (1) of section one hundred and seventeen from “ but ” onwards.
52 & 53 Vict. c. clxvii	Local Government Board's Provisional Order Confirmation (No. 2) Act 1889	The Local Government Board's Provisional Order Confirmation (No. 2) Act, 1889.	In the Schedule, in Article VI, the words “ custos rotulorum ”, the words “ quarter sessions, justices ” and the words “ and clerk of the peace”; paragraph (1) of Article VII; in paragraph (2) of Article VII the words “ or quarter sessions ”; paragraph (2) of Article VIII; Articles IX, XI and XII; in Article XV the words from the beginning to “ Southampton and” where first occurring and the words “ and quarter sessions ”; in Articles XVI and XVII the words “ and quarter sessions” wherever occurring, and in paragraph (2) of Article XVII the words from “ and all” to “ order ”.
53 & 54 Vict. c. 5	Lunacy Act 1890	The Lunacy Act, 1890.	In subsections (4) and (6) of section ten, the words “ or place” wherever occurring; section three hundred and twenty-six from “ and ” onwards.
57 & 58 Vict. c. 57	Diseases of Animals Act 1894	The Diseases of Animals Act, 1894.	Subsection (5) of section fifty-seven.
57 & 58 Vict. c. 60	Merchant Shipping Act 1894	The Merchant Shipping Act, 1894.	Subsection (6) of section two hundred and fourteen from “and fines” onwards; subsection (3) of section two hundred and thirty-two; subsection (4) of section two hundred and eighty-seven from “and the fine” onwards; in subsection (3) of section three hundred and seventy-six, the words “ the person by whom the wages are payable or of ”; in subsection (1) of section six hundred and ninety-nine in its application to courts of summary jurisdiction, the words from “ or to be applied ” onwards.
57 & 58 Vict. c. xxvii	Merthyr Tydfil Stipendiary Justice Act 1894	The Merthyr Tydfil Stipendiary Justice Act, 1894.	In section four the words from the first “shall” to “he”, except as respects the magistrate holding office at the coming into force of this repeal; in section five, the words from “ at ” to “ state ”; sections seven to ten.
58 & 59 Vict. c. cvii	Staffordshire Potteries Stipendiary Justice Act 1895	The Staffordshire Potteries Stipendiary Justice Act, 1895.	Section eight; in section eleven, the words from “by the” to “ or ” where next occurring and the word “ other ”.
60 & 61 Vict. c. 26	Metropolitan Police Courts Act 1897	The Metropolitan Police Courts Act, 1897.	Section one from the last “ and ” onwards; section six; in section seven in subsection (1) the words from “or” onwards and subsection (2).
61 & 62 Vict. c. 31	Metropolitan Police Courts Act 1898	The Metropolitan Police Courts Act, 1898.	The whole act.
62 & 63 Vict. c. xc	South Staffordshire Stipendiary Justice Act 1899	The South Staffordshire Stipendiary Justice Act, 1899.	In subsection (5) of section fifteen, the words from “ of one ” to “ be paid ”; in subsection (3) of section seventeen the words from “ of four ” to “ be paid ”; sections nineteen and twenty; in section twenty-two the words “ and clerk of accounts ”; in section twenty-three the words “ or the clerk of accounts ”; in section twenty-four the words “clerk of accounts”; section twenty-seven.
63 & 64 Vict. c. clvii	Ramsgate Corporation Act 1900	The Ramsgate Corporation Act, 1900.	Section eighteen from the words “ and from ” onwards, so far as relates to the court of quarter sessions for the county of Kent or any division thereof; sections nineteen and twenty.
4 Edw. 7. c. 28	Weights and Measures Act 1904	The Weights and Measures Act. 1904.	Subsection (2) of section thirteen.
4 Edw. 7. c. clvii	County of Suffolk Act 1904	The County of Suffolk Act, 1904.	Sections four, five and six; in section seven the words “either at courts of sessions of the peace or”; section eight; in section sixteen the words “ or custos rotulorum ” and the words “custos rotulorum” in the second place where they occur; section seventeen to the words “ respectively and ”; section nineteen.
7 Edw. 7. c. 9	Territorial and Reserve Forces Act 1907	The Territorial and Reserve Forces Act, 1907.	Subsection (3) of section twenty-four from “ subject” onwards.
7 Edw. 7. c. cxxviii	Merthyr Tydfil Stipendiary Justice Act 1907	The Merthyr Tydfil Stipendiary Justice Act, 1907.	In section three, in subsection (4) the words from “ and such ” to “ magistrate ” except as respects the magistrate holding office at the coming into force of this repeal, and paragraph (B) of subsection (5); section four; in section five, subsections (3) to (8); sections six and seven.
8 Edw. 7. c. 44	Commons Act 1908	The Commons Act, 1908	Subsection (2) of section one from the second “and” onwards.
10 Edw. 7 & 1 Geo. 5. c. 24	Licensing (Consolidation) Act 1910	The Licensing (Consolidation) Act, 1910.	In section two, subsection (3) except the words “ (3) For the purposes of this Act as respects a licensing district being a borough the licensing justices are the borough licensing committee ”, and subsection (5); in section three, subsection (1) from “ during ” onwards and subsection (2); the concluding paragraph of subsection (1) of section twenty-nine; section one hundred and four; section one hundred and five from “but” onwards; in section one hundred and ten in the definition of “county”, the first paragraph and in the second paragraph the words from “ and ” onwards.
2 & 3 Geo. 5. c. 3	Shops Act 1912	The Shops Act, 1912	The proviso to subsection (1) of section fourteen from the last “ and ” onwards.
3 & 4 Geo. 5. c. 27	Forgery Act 1913	The Forgery Act, 1913	Subsection (5) of section five and subsection (3) of section eight.
4 & 5 Geo. 5. c. 6	Affiliation Orders Act 1914	The Affiliation Orders Act, 1914.	Subsection (1) of section one and subsection (3) of that section from “ and where ” onwards.
4 & 5 Geo. 5. c. 58	Criminal Justice Administration Act 1914	The Criminal Justice Administration Act, 1914.	Paragraph (d) of subsection (1) of section five from the word “ offence ” onwards, except the word “ fine ”; subsection (4) of section thirty; section thirty-four.
8 & 9 Geo. 5.	Unknown	The Air Force Act	In section one hundred and sixty-six subsection (3) and subsection (6) to the word “ informer ”.
10 & 11 Geo. 5. c. lxxxvi	Pontypridd Stipendiary Magistrate Act 1920	The Pontypridd Stipendiary Magistrate Act, 1920.	Section six from the first “ attend ” to the last “ shall”, except as respects the magistrate holding office at the coming into force of this repeal; in section seven the words from “ at ” to “ state ”; sections eight to sixteen.
11 & 12 Geo. 5. c. 31	Police Pensions Act 1921	The Police Pensions Act, 1921.	In the Second Schedule, paragraphs 1 and 3 and as respects fines imposed by a court of summary jurisdiction paragraph 2.
12 & 13 Geo. 5. c. lxxvi	Birmingham Corporation Act 1922	The Birmingham Corporation Act, 1922.	Section eighty-one.
13 & 14 Geo. 5. c. 8	Industrial Assurance Act 1923	The Industrial Assurance Act, 1923.	In its application to courts of summary jurisdiction subsection (6) of section thirty-nine to the second “ and ”.
13 & 14 Geo. 5. c. 16	Salmon and Freshwater Fisheries Act 1923	The Salmon and Freshwater Fisheries Act, 1923.	Subsection (2) of section seventy-three.
20 & 21 Geo. 5. c. clxxiv	Cardiff Corporation Act 1930	The Cardiff Corporation Act, 1930.	Section one hundred and twenty-seven except as respects a magistrate to whom subsection (1) of section thirty-three of this Act does not apply.
20 & 21 Geo. 5. c. clxxviii	Manchester Corporation (General Powers) Act 1930	The Manchester Corporation (General Powers) Act, 1930.	Section thirty-nine as respects any person who after the coming into force of section twenty-two of this Act is or serves the clerk to the justices.
21 & 22 Geo. 5. c. 42	Agricultural Marketing Act 1931	The Agricultural Marketing Act, 1931.	In its application to courts of summary jurisdiction, subsection (4) of section six.
23 & 24 Geo. 5. c. 12	Children and Young Persons Act 1933	The Children and Young Persons Act, 1933.	The proviso to subsection (2) of section forty-seven; subsection (6) of section forty-eight; paragraph (d) of subsection (2) of section eighty-eight from “to order” onwards; paragraph 3 of the Second Schedule.
23 & 24 Geo. 5. c. 25	Pharmacy and Poisons Act 1933	The Pharmacy and Poisons Act, 1933.	Subsection (4) of section twenty-four.
23 & 24 Geo. 5. c. 31	Agricultural Marketing Act 1933	The Agricultural Marketing Act, 1933.	The second paragraph of subsection (5) of section six.
23 & 24 Geo. 5. c. 51	Local Government Act 1933	The Local Government Act, 1933.	In section eighteen, subsection (9).
25 & 26 Geo. 5. c. 9	Herring Industry Act 1935	The Herring Industry Act, 1935.	The second paragraph of subsection (2) of section six.
26 Geo. 5 & 1 Edw. 8. c. 5	Public Health (London) Act 1936	The Public Health (London) Act, 1936.	Subsection (3) of section forty-five; subsection (4) of section sixty-two; subsection (4) of section sixty-four; subsection (1) of section seventy-three; subsection (1) of section one hundred and seventy-eight; in section two hundred and sixty-five, subsection (2) as respects fines imposed by a court of summary jurisdiction; in section two hundred and eighty-one, subsection (1) and in subsection (3) the words “ fines or other sums recoverable or ”; Part IV of the First Schedule.
26 Geo. 5 & 1 Edw. 8. c. cxi	Wolverhampton Corporation Act 1936	The Wolverhampton Corporation Act, 1936.	Except as respects the magistrate holding office at the coming into force of this repeal, section one hundred and one, except paragraph (b), and in that paragraph the words “ under this section ”.
1 Edw. 8 & 1 Geo. 6. c. 58	Summary Procedure (Domestic Proceedings) Act 1937	The Summary Procedure (Domestic Proceedings) Act, 1937.	In section nine in subsection (1) the words “ the City of London or ” and subsection (e)
1 Edw. 8 & 1 Geo. 6. c. 67	Factories Act 1937	The Factories Act, 1937	In section one hundred and thirty-three the words “ or otherwise ”.
1 Edw. 8 & 1 Geo. 6. c. 68	Local Government Superannuation Act 1937	The Local Government Superannuation Act, 1937.	In section twenty, subsections (1) to (3) and in subsection (4) the words “ In this section and”; in Part III of the Second Schedule, paragraphs (a) to (f) and in paragraph (g) the words “ a clerk or an employee of a clerk or ”.
7 & 8 Geo. 6. c. xxi	Middlesex County Council Act 1944	The Middlesex County Council Act, 1944.	Sections three hundred and ninety-seven, three hundred and ninety-eight and four hundred and eighteen, the Fifth Schedule except paragraph (f) and in that paragraph the words “ any officer to whom this Schedule applies or”.
8 & 9 Geo. 6. c. 38	Local Government (Boundary Commission) Act 1945	The Local Government (Boundary Commission) Act, 1945.	Subsection (2) of section two.
8 & 9 Geo. 6. c. iv	Staffordshire Potteries Stipendiary Justice Act 1945	The Staffordshire Potteries Stipendiary Justice Act, 1945.	The whole act.
9 & 10 Geo. 6. c. 20	Building Materials and Housing Act 1945	The Building Materials and Housing Act, 1945.	Paragraph (a) of subsection (7) of section seven.
9 & 10 Geo. 6. c. 81	National Health Service Act 1946	The National Health Service Act, 1946.	In the Ninth Schedule, the paragraph amending section three hundred and twenty-six of the Lunacy Act, 1890.
9 & 10 Geo. 6. c. xxxviii	Manchester Corporation Act 1946	The Manchester Corporation Act, 1946.	Section fifty-nine.
11 & 12 Geo. 6. c. 10	Emergency Laws (Miscellaneous Provisions) Act 1947	The Emergency Laws (Miscellaneous Provisions) Act, 1947.	Sub-paragraph (2) of paragraph 5 of the Second Schedule.
11 & 12 Geo. 6. c. 38	Companies Act 1948	The Companies Act, 1948	In its application to courts of summary jurisdiction section four hundred and forty-four to the word “ all”.
11 & 12 Geo. 6. c. liii	London County Council (General Powers) Act 1948	The London County Council (General Powers) Act, 1948.	Section forty-eight.
12 & 13 Geo. 6. c. 27	Juries Act 1949	The Juries Act, 1949.	In subsection (4) of section six the words “ or at a court of quarter sessions held for that county” in section nine the words “ and quarter sessions ” in both places.

== Subsequent developments ==
The whole act was repealed by section 1 of, and part 5 of schedule 1 to, the Statute Law (Repeals) Act 2013, which came into force on 31 January 2013.
