= Useless Parliament =

English parliament under King Charles I, 1625

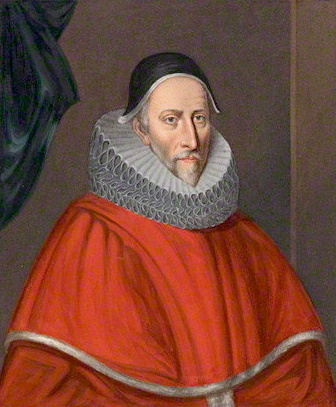
Sir Thomas Crewe, Speaker

The Useless Parliament was the first Parliament of England of the reign of King Charles I, sitting only from June until August 1625. It gained its name because it transacted no significant business, making it 'useless' from the king's point of view. Parliament adjourned to Oxford on 1 August, and was dissolved on 12 August, having offended the king.

== Events ==
Charles acceded to the Throne upon the death of his father, James VI and I, on 27 March 1625. Parliament was summoned by the king on 2 April and convened at Westminster on 18 June, first meeting only a month after Charles's marriage to Henrietta Maria, a daughter of King Henry IV of France.

Thomas Crewe was again elected as Speaker of the House of Commons, having served in that office previously, but this led Sir John Eliot to refer to the position as "frequently filled by nullities, men selected for mere Court convenience".

Charles had asked the parliament to vote him the duties of tonnage and poundage for life, as had been customary at the beginning of each monarch's reign since 1414, but the House of Commons broke with tradition and voted to grant the king these important duties for one year only, together with £140,000 for war with Spain, apparently intending to force him to come back to ask them to vote him money in every future year. The king was greatly troubled and provoked by this, as tonnage and poundage had long provided the Crown's main source of income. Some parliamentarians were anxious about the king's wish to send forces to take part in the Thirty Years' War on the continent of Europe and also about his reputation for extravagance, but it is now argued that their collective intention was to review such duties generally, giving the king tonnage and poundage for a year pending negotiations on reform.

At the end of July, a severe intensification of the bubonic plague in London led to the king's court and Parliament being temporarily moved to Oxford. Although the Commons had passed a bill to grant Charles the duties he wanted for one year, the Duke of Buckingham and others succeeded in blocking this in the House of Lords, with the result that Parliament granted the new king no rights of tonnage and poundage at all. In conjunction with its attempts to impeach Buckingham, this led to the king peremptorily dissolving parliament on 12 August. It was later judged to have bungled an attempt to clip the king's wings.

== Aftermath ==
After the Parliament was dissolved, the king's favourites encouraged his belief in having a divine right to rule his kingdoms as he wished and urged him to do without the constitutional means of raising revenue, instead using arbitrary measures which in some cases were of uncertain lawfulness. This Charles did, which later led to remonstrances against his taking of tonnage and poundage without Parliament's authority. The next Parliament, the 2nd Parliament of Charles I, assembled in February 1626 and declared that the king had acted unlawfully, although it was prepared to indemnify him.

== Notable acts passed by the Parliament ==
- Sunday Observance Act 1625

== See also ==
- List of MPs elected to the English parliament in 1625
- List of acts of the 1st Parliament of King Charles I
- List of parliaments of England
- Duration of English parliaments before 1660
