= Statute Law Revision Act 1958 =

Act of the Parliament of the United Kingdom

Statute Law Revision Act 1958 (Note: Section 6.)
- Act of Parliament
- Parliament of the United Kingdom
- Long title: An Act to revise the statute law by repealing enactments which have ceased to be in force or have become unnecessary and re-enacting a provision of certain Acts which are otherwise spent.
- Citation: 6 & 7 Eliz. 2. c. 46
- Territorial extent: United Kingdom (Note: Section 5.)

Dates
- Royal assent: 23 July 1958
- Commencement: 23 July 1958 (Note: The Acts of Parliament (Commencement) Act 1793)
Other legislation
Amended by	Northern Ireland Constitution Act 1973; Statute Law (Repeals) Act 1974
Relates to	Repeal of Obsolete Statutes Act 1856; See Statute Law Revision Act

Status: Amended

Text of statute as originally enacted

Revised text of statute as amended

Text of the Statute Law Revision Act 1958 as in force today (including any amendments) within the United Kingdom, from legislation.gov.uk.

The Statute Law Revision Act 1958 (6 & 7 Eliz. 2. c. 46) is an act of the Parliament of the United Kingdom.

== Provisions ==
Section 4(1) of the act provides:

There shall be paid out of moneys provided by Parliament or, if those moneys are insufficient, there shall be charged on and paid out of the Consolidated Fund of the United Kingdom, such sums as are required for the purpose of fulfilling any obligations incurred before the fifteenth day of August, nineteen hundred and nineteen, by the Government of His late Majesty King George the Fifth in connection with the 1914-1918 war in respect of payments for compensation in respect of persons killed or injured on any merchant ship or fishing vessel.

Section 4(2) of the act additionally repealed the Government War Obligations Acts, 1914 to 1919, whose provisions were spent apart from the provision re-enacted by section 4(1) of the act.

=== Repealed enactments ===
Sections 1, 2 and 3 of the act repealed 77 enactments, listed in the first, second and third schedules to the act, respectively.

==== First schedule: Obsolete, &c., Acts repealed ====
First schedule — Obsolete, &c., Acts repealed
Citation	Short title	Description	Extent of repeal
Stat. Temp. Incert.	Ne Rector prosternat Arbores in Cemiterio	Ne Rector prosternat Arbores in Cemiterio.	The whole act.
5 Edw. 3. c. 5	Sale of Wares after Close of Fair Act 1331	Penalty for selling ware after close of fair.	The whole act.
4 Hen. 7. c. 20	Collusive Actions Act 1488	The Collusive Actions Act, 1488.	The whole act.
34 & 35 Hen. 8. c. 2	Public Accountant Act 1542	An Acte concerning Collectoures and Receyvoures.	The whole act.
34 & 35 Hen. 8. c. 8	Herbalists Act 1542	The Herbalists Act, 1542.	The whole act.
34 & 35 Hen. 8. c. 9	Unloading of Ballast, etc. from Ships Act 1542	An Acte for the Preservacon of the Ryver of Severne.	The whole act.
1 Jas. 1. c. 5 (Note: This is the citation in The Statutes of the Realm.)	Court Leet Act 1603	An Act to prevent the overcharge of the People by Stewards of Courte Leetes and Courte Barons.	The whole act.
21 Jas. 1. c. 14	Intrusions Act 1623	The Intrusions Act, 1623.	The whole act.
5 Geo. 1. c. 11	Adulteration of Coffee Act 1718	The Adulteration of Coffee Act, 1718.	The whole act.
11 Geo. 1. c. 30	Adulteration of Tea and Coffee Act 1724	The Adulteration of Tea and Coffee Act, 1724.	The whole act.
4 Geo. 2. c. 14	Adulteration of Tea Act 1730	The Adulteration of Tea Act, 1730.	The whole act.
12 Geo. 3. c. 45	Traffic Regulation (Scotland) Act 1772	The Traffic Regulation (Scotland) Act, 1772.	The whole act.
17 Geo. 3. c. 29	Adulteration of Tea Act 1776	The Adulteration of Tea Act, 1776.	The whole act.
49 Geo. 3. c. 32	Pension Duties Act 1809	The Pension Duties Act, 1809.	The whole act.
49 Geo. 3. c. 110	Pension Duties (No. 2) Act 1809	The Pension Duties Act (No. 2) Act, 1809.	The whole act.
50 Geo. 3. c. 56	Pension Duties Act 1810	The Pension Duties Act, 1810.	The whole act.
52 Geo. 3. c. 56	Pension Duties Act 1812	The Pension Duties Act, 1812.	The whole act.
52 Geo. 3. c. 144	Members of Parliament (Bankruptcy) Act 1812	The Members of Parliament (Bankruptcy) Act, 1812.	The whole act.
59 Geo. 3. c. 12	Poor Relief Act 1819	The Poor Relief Act, 1819.	The whole act.
1 Geo. 4. c. 4	Stage Coaches (Scotland) Act 1820	The Stage Coaches (Scotland) Act, 1820.	The whole act.
6 Geo. 4. c. 9	Duties on Offices Act 1825	The Duties on Offices Act, 1825.	The whole act.
6 Geo. 4. c. 69	Transportation Act 1825	The Transportation Act, 1825.	The whole act.
7 Geo. 4. c. 46	Country Bankers Act 1826	The Country Bankers Act, 1826.	The whole act.
6 & 7 Will. 4. c. 97	Duties on Offices and Pensions Act 1836	The Duties on Offices and Pensions Act, 1836.	The whole act.
9 & 10 Vict. c. 101	Public Money Drainage Act 1846	The Public Money Drainage Act, 1846.	The whole act.
10 & 11 Vict. c. 11	Public Money Drainage Act 1847	The Public Money Drainage Act, 1847.	The whole act.
11 & 12 Vict. c. 101	Lock-up Houses Act 1848	The Lock-up Houses Act, 1848.	The whole act.
11 & 12 Vict. c. 119	Public Money Drainage Act 1848	The Public Money Drainage Act, 1848.	The whole act.
12 & 13 Vict. c. 8	Poor Law (Overseers) Act 1849	The Poor Law (Overseers) Act, 1849.	The whole act.
13 & 14 Vict. c. 31	Public Money Drainage Act 1850	The Public Money Drainage Act, 1850.	The whole act.
14 & 15 Vict. c. 81	Lunatics Removal (India) Act 1851	The Lunatics Removal (India) Act, 1851.	The whole act.
19 & 20 Vict. c. 9	Public Money Drainage Act 1856	The Public Money Drainage Act, 1856.	The whole act.
21 & 22 Vict. c. 52	Inferior Courts Officers (Ireland) Act 1858	The Inferior Courts Officers (Ireland) Act, 1858.	The whole act.
24 & 25 Vict. c. 31	Sierra Leone Offences Act 1861	The Sierra Leone Offences Act, 1861.	The whole act.
25 & 26 Vict. c. 65	Jurisdiction in Homicides Act 1862	The Jurisdiction in Homicides Act, 1862.	The whole act.
25 & 26 Vict. c. 67	Declaration of Title Act 1862	The Declaration of Title Act, 1862.	The whole act.
26 & 27 Vict. c. 119	Exhibition Medals Act 1863	The Exhibition Medals Act, 1863.	The whole act.
28 & 29 Vict. c. 78	Mortgage Debenture Act 1865	The Mortgage Debenture Act, 1865.	The whole act.
28 & 29 Vict. c. 106	Colonial Docks Loans Act 1865	The Colonial Docks Loans Act, 1865.	The whole act.
29 & 30 Vict. c. 63	Courts of Justice Act 1866	The Courts of Justice Act, 1866.	The whole act.
33 & 34 Vict. c. 20	Mortgage Debenture (Amendment) Act 1870	The Mortgage Debenture (Amendment) Act, 1870.	The whole act.
34 & 35 Vict. c. 8	West African Offences Act 1871	The West African Offences Act, 1871.	The whole act.
39 & 40 Vict. c. 10	Royal Titles Act 1876	The Royal Titles Act, 1876.	The whole act.
40 & 41 Vict. c. 10	Customs and Inland Revenue Amendment Act 1877	The Customs and Inland Revenue Amendment Act, 1877.	The whole act.
42 & 43 Vict. c. 59	Civil Procedure Acts Repeal Act 1879	The Civil Procedure Acts Repeal Act, 1879.	The whole act.
1 Edw. 7. c. 15	Royal Titles Act 1901	The Royal Titles Act, 1901.	The whole act.
4 & 5 Geo. 5. c. 38	East African Protectorates (Loans) Act 1914	The East African Protectorates (Loans) Act, 1914.	The whole act.
9 & 10 Geo. 5. c. 43	Government of the Soudan Loan Act 1919	The Government of the Soudan Loan Act, 1919.	The whole act.
10 & 11 Geo. 5. c. 76	Agriculture Act 1920	The Agriculture Act, 1920.	The whole act.
12 & 13 Geo. 5. c. 15	Government of the Soudan Loan (Amendment) Act 1922	The Government of the Soudan Loan (Amendment) Act, 1922.	The whole act.
12 & 13 Geo. 5. c. 26	Anglo-Persian Oil Company (Payment of Calls) Act 1922	The Anglo-Persian Oil Company (Payment of Calls) Act, 1922.	The whole act.
15 & 16 Geo. 5. c. 43	Former Enemy Aliens (Disabilities Removal) Act 1925	The Former Enemy Aliens (Disabilities Removal) Act, 1925.	The whole act.
18 & 19 Geo. 5. c. 37	Post Office and Telegraph (Money) Act 1928	The Post Office and Telegraph (Money) Act, 1928.	The whole act.
21 & 22 Geo. 5. c. 20	Post Office and Telegraph (Money) Act 1931	The Post Office and Telegraph (Money) Act, 1931.	The whole act.
2 & 3 Geo. 6. c. 6	Czechoslovakia (Financial Assistance) Act 1939	The Czechoslovakia (Financial Assistance) Act, 1939.	The whole act.
3 & 4 Geo. 6. c. 24	National Service (Channel Islands) Act 1940	The National Service (Channel Islands) Act, 1940.	The whole act.

==== Second schedule: Obsolete, &c., provisions concerning the Crown Estate and public buildings repealed ====
Second schedule — Obsolete, &c., provisions concerning the Crown Estate and public buildings repealed
Citation	Short title	Extent of repeal
Crown Estate Provisions
10 Geo. 4. c. 50	Crown Lands Act 1829	Sections five, thirty-nine, fifty-three to fifty-six, ninety, one hundred and six, one hundred and twenty-eight and one hundred and twenty-nine.
2 & 3 Will. 4. c. 1	Crown Lands Act 1832	Sections one and nine.
8 & 9 Vict. c. 99	Crown Lands Act 1845	Sections nine, eleven, twelve and thirteen.
11 & 12 Vict. c. 102	Crown Lands Act 1848	Sections six and seven.
14 & 15 Vict. c. 42	Crown Lands Act 1851	Sections one and two.
29 & 30 Vict. c. 62	Crown Lands Act 1866	Section twenty-nine.
13 & 14 Geo. 5. c. 21	Forestry (Transfer of Woods) Act 1923	Section four.
Public Buildings Provisions
60 & 61 Vict. c. 27	Public Offices (Whitehall Site) Act 1897	Section four.
61 & 62 Vict. c. 5	Public Buildings Expenses Act 1898	The whole act.
3 & 4 Geo. 5. c. 14	Public Buildings Expenses Act 1913	The whole act.

==== Third schedule: Acts repealed so far as entitling persons to plead general issue in civil proceedings ====
Third schedule — Acts repealed so far as entitling persons to plead general issue in civil proceedings
Citation	Short title	Description	Extent of repeal
1 Cha. 1. c. 1	Sunday Observance Act 1625	The Sunday Observance Act, 1625.	The words from " and that if any man " to " evidence ".
3 Cha. 1. c. 2	Sunday Observance Act 1627	An Act for the further reformacion of sondry abuses committed on the Lord's Day commonlie called Sonday.	The second proviso.
11 Geo. 2. c. 19	Distress for Rent Act 1737	The Distress for Rent Act, 1737.	Section twenty-one.
25 Geo. 2. c. 8 (I)	Apprentices Act (Ireland) 1751	The Apprentices Act (Ireland), 1751.	Section eight.
13 Geo. 3. c. 78	Highways Act 1773	An Act to explain, amend and reduce into one Act of Parliament the Statutes now in being for the Amendment and Preservation of the Public Highways within that part of Great Britain called England; and for other purposes.	In section eighty-one, the words from " the defendant or defendants in every such action " to "have been so done, or".
14 Geo. 3. c. 78	Fires Prevention (Metropolis) Act 1774	The Fires Prevention (Metropolis) Act, 1774.	In section eighty-six, the words from " And in such case " to " to be had ".
42 Geo. 3. c. 119	Gaming Act 1802	The Gaming Act, 1802.	Section seven.
1 & 2 Will. 4. c. 32	Game Act 1831	The Game Act, 1831.	In section forty-six, the words " and may be given in evidence under the general issue ".
3 & 4 Vict. c. 9	Parliamentary Papers Act 1840	The Parliamentary Papers Act, 1840.	In section three, the words " under the general issue ".
6 & 7 Vict. c. 40	Hosiery Act 1843	The Hosiery Act, 1843.	In section thirty-one, the words " in any such action ", where first occurring, and the words " may plead the general issue, or ".
7 & 8 Vict. c. 22	Gold and Silver Wares Act 1844	The Gold and Silver Wares Act, 1844.	In section thirteen, the words from " and the defendant " to " had thereupon ".

== Subsequent developments ==
Section 5 of the act was repealed by section 41(1) of, and part I of schedule 6 to, the Northern Ireland Constitution Act 1973, which came into force on 18 July 1973.

Sections 1–3 and 4(2) of, and schedules 1, 2 and 3 to, the act were repealed by section 1 of, and part XI of the schedule to, the Statute Law (Repeals) Act 1974, which came into force on 27 June 1974.

The enactments which were repealed (whether for the whole or any part of the United Kingdom) by the act were repealed so far as they extended to the Isle of Man by section 1(1) of, and schedule 1 to, the Statute Law Revision (Isle of Man) Act 1991, which came into force on 25 July 1991.

== See also ==
- Statute Law Revision Act

== Bibliography ==
- Halsbury's Statutes. Fourth Edition. 2008 Reissue. Volume 41. Page 761.
