= List of acts of the Parliament of England from 1625 =

This is a list of acts of the Parliament of England for the year 1625.

For acts passed during the period 1707–1800, see the list of acts of the Parliament of Great Britain. See also the list of acts of the Parliament of Scotland, and the list of acts of the Parliament of Ireland.

For acts passed from 1801 onwards, see the list of acts of the Parliament of the United Kingdom. For acts of the devolved parliaments and assemblies in the United Kingdom, see the list of acts of the Scottish Parliament, the list of acts of the Northern Ireland Assembly, and the list of acts and measures of Senedd Cymru; see also the list of acts of the Parliament of Northern Ireland.

For medieval statutes, etc. that are not considered to be acts of Parliament, see the list of English statutes.

See also the List of ordinances and acts of the Parliament of England, 1642–1660 for ordinances and acts passed by the Long Parliament and other bodies without royal assent, and which were not considered to be valid legislation following the Restoration in 1660.

The number shown after each act's title is its chapter number. Acts are cited using this number, preceded by the years of the reign during which the relevant parliamentary session was held; thus the Union with Ireland Act 1800 is cited as "39 & 40 Geo. 3. c. 67", meaning the 67th act passed during the session that started in the 39th year of the reign of George III and which finished in the 40th year of that reign. The modern convention is to use Arabic numerals in citations (thus "41 Geo. 3" rather than "41 Geo. III"). Acts of the last session of the Parliament of Great Britain and the first session of the Parliament of the United Kingdom are both cited as "41 Geo. 3".

Acts passed by the Parliament of England did not have a short title; however, some of these acts have subsequently been given a short title by acts of the Parliament of the United Kingdom, such as the Short Titles Act 1896 (59 & 60 Vict. c. 14).

Acts passed by the Parliament of England were deemed to have come into effect on the first day of the session in which they were passed. Because of this, the years given in the list below may in fact be the year before a particular act was passed.

== 1 Cha. 1 ==
The 1st Parliament of King Charles I (the 'Useless Parliament') which met from 17 May 1625 until 12 August 1625.

Note that this session was traditionally cited as 1 Car. 1, 1 Chas. 1, 1 C. 1; it is listed in the "Chronological Table of the Statutes" as 1 Cha. 1

=== Public acts ===
| Short title | Citation | Royal assent |
Long title
| Sunday Observance Act 1625 (repealed) | 1 Cha. 1. c. 1 | 11 July 1625 |
An Act for punishing divers abuses committed on the Lord's day, called Sunday. (Repealed by Statute Law Revision Act 1948 (11 & 12 Geo. 6. c. 62), Justices of the Peace Act 1949 (12, 13 & 14 Geo. 6. c. 101), Statute Law Revision Act 1958 (6 & 7 Eliz. 2. c. 46), Ecclesiastical Jurisdiction Measure 1963 (No. 1) and Statute Law (Repeals) Act 1969 (c. 52))
| Duchy of Cornwall Act 1625 (repealed) | 1 Cha. 1. c. 2 | 11 July 1625 |
An Act to enable the King's majesty to make leases of lands, parcel of his Highness dutchy of Cornwall, or annexed to the same. (Repealed by Statute Law Revision Act 1948 (11 & 12 Geo. 6. c. 62))
| Licences of Alienation Act 1625 (repealed) | 1 Cha. 1. c. 3 | 11 July 1625 |
An Act for the ease in obtaining of licences of alienation, and in the pleading of alienations with licence, or of pardons of alienations without licence, in the court of exchequer, or elsewhere. (Repealed by Statute Law Revision Act 1863 (26 & 27 Vict. c. 125))
| Alehouses Act 1625 (repealed) | 1 Cha. 1. c. 4 | 11 July 1625 |
An Act for the further restraint of tippling in inns, alehouses, and other victualling-houses. (Repealed by Alehouse Act 1828 (9 Geo. 4. c. 61))
| Taxation Act 1625 (repealed) | 1 Cha. 1. c. 5 | 11 July 1625 |
An Act for three intire subsidies granted by the spiritualty. (Repealed by Statute Law Revision Act 1863 (26 & 27 Vict. c. 125))
| Taxation (No. 2) Act 1625 (repealed) | 1 Cha. 1. c. 6 | 11 July 1625 |
An Act for two intire subsidies granted by the temporalty. (Repealed by Statute Law Revision Act 1863 (26 & 27 Vict. c. 125))
| Parliament Act 1625 (repealed) | 1 Cha. 1. c. 7 | 11 July 1625 |
This session of parliament (by reason of the increase of the sickness and other inconveniences of the season, requiring a speedy adjournment, nevertheless) shall not determine by his Majesty's royal assent to this and some other acts. (Repealed by Statute Law Revision Act 1863 (26 & 27 Vict. c. 125))

=== Private acts ===
| Short title | Citation | Royal assent |
Long title
| Manors of Cheltenham and Asheley or Charlton Kings (Gloucestershire) Act 1625 | 1 Cha. 1. c. 1 Pr. | 11 July 1625 |
An Act for the Settling and Confirmation of Copyhold Estates and Customs of the Tenants in base Tenure of the Manor of Cheltenham in the County of Gloucester, and of the Manor of Ashley, otherwise called Charleton Kings in the said County, being holden of the said Manor of Cheltenham, according to an Agreement thereof made between the King's most Excellent Majesty, being then Prince of Wales, Duke of Cornwal and of York, and Earl of Chester, Lord of the said Manor of Cheltenham, and Giles Grevill Esquire, Lord of the said Manor of Ashley, and the said Copyholders of the said several Manors.
| Manor of Macclesfield (Cheshire) Act 1625 | 1 Cha. 1. c. 2 Pr. | 11 July 1625 |
An Act for the Enabling and Confirmation of an Agreement or Composition made between the King's Majesty's Commissioners of Revenue, his Majesty being then Prince of Wales, Duke of Cornwal and Earl of Chester, on his Majesty's Behalf, and his Majesty's Copyholders of his Highness Manor of Macclesfield in the County of Chester, and of a Decree made in the Court of Exchequer at Chester, for the perfect Creation and Confirmation of certain Lands and Tenements, Parcel of the said Manor, to be Copyhold and Customary Lands, according to the Tenor of the same Decree.

=== Sources ===
- Raithby, John, ed. (1963) [1819]. "1° Car. I.". Statutes of the Realm. Vol. 5: The Statutes of King Charles I and King Charles II (1625–1680). London: Dawsons. pp. 1–21 – via HathiTrust.
- Raithby, John, ed. (1819). Statutes of the Realm. Vol. 5: 1628-80 – via British History Online.
- Pickering, Danby, ed. (1763). "Anno primo Caroli". The Statutes at Large. Vol. 7: From the Thirty-ninth Year of Q. Elizabeth to the Twelfth Year of K. Charles. Inclusive. Cambridge: Joseph Bentham. pp. 314–317 – via Internet Archive.
- Journal of the House of Commons. Vol. 1 – 1547-1629. His Majesty's Stationery Office. 1802 – via British History Online.
- Journal of the House of Lords. Vol. 3: 1620-1628. London: His Majesty's Stationery Office. 1830 – via British History Online.
- Chronological Table of and Index to the Statutes. Vol. 1: To the End of the Session 59 Vict. Sess. 2 (1895) (13th ed.). London: Her Majesty's Stationery Office. 1896. p. 67 – via Google Books.
- Chronological Table of the Statutes: Covering the Period from 1235 to the End of 1971. London: Her Majesty's Stationery Office. 1972. p. 65. ISBN 978-0-11-840096-1 – via Google Books.
- "Chronological Tables of the Private and Personal Acts: Part 2 (1603–1640)". legislation.gov.uk. The National Archives.
- The Statutes at Large – via Internet Archive.
- The Statutes at Large – via Google Books.
- The Statutes: Revised Edition – via Internet Archive.
- The Statutes: Revised Edition – via Google Books.
- The Statutes at Large – via Internet Archive.
- The Statutes at Large – via Google Books.

== See also ==
- List of acts of the Parliament of England
