= Chester and Cheshire (Constituencies) Act 1542 =

Act of the Parliament of England

- Act of Parliament
- Parliament of England
- Long title: An Act for Knights and Burgesses to have Places in the Parliament for the County Palatine and City of Chester
- Citation: 34 & 35 Hen. 8. c. 13
- Territorial extent: England and Wales

Dates
- Royal assent: 12 May 1543
- Commencement: 12 May 1543 (Note: Section 1. End of session.)
- Repealed: 30 July 1948

Other legislation
- Amended by: Statute Law Revision Act 1863
- Repealed by: Representation of the People Act 1948

Status: Repealed

Text of statute as originally enacted

The Chester and Cheshire (Constituencies) Act 1542 (34 & 35 Hen. 8. c. 13) was an act of the Parliament of England that allowed the county palatine of Cheshire in the Kingdom of England to be represented in the Parliament of England. The act was approved by royal assent of Henry VIII on 12 May 1543 and Cheshire sent its first representatives to Parliament on 1 October 1543. The act was formally repealed by the Representation of the People Act 1948 (11 & 12 Geo. 6. c. 65).

The earldom of Chester is traditionally vested in the sovereign's eldest son upon his crowning as Prince of Wales.

== Background ==
Chester was established as a county palatine by William the Conqueror after he gained control of the land following his victory at the Battle of Hastings in 1066. Between 1067 and 1070, William named his advocate Gerbod the Fleming as the first Earl of Chester, named for the city of Chester. Prior to 1543, Cheshire had its own parliament, consisting of barons of the county.

== Provisions ==
Section 1 of the act provided that from the end of the session (Note: 12 May 1543.), the County of Chester would have two knights for the shire and the city Chester would have two burgesses for the Parliament.

Section 2 of the act provided that no writ of course in the nature of protection would be granted in the County Palatine of Chester until on and after 1 October 1543.

== Subsequent developments ==
After the law was commenced on 1 October 1543, Cheshire sent its first representatives to the Parliament of England.

In 1832, the Cheshire constituency was abolished and replaced with constituencies for North Cheshire and South Cheshire. These constituencies were divided in 1868.

Section 2 of the act was repealed by section 1 of, and the schedule to, the Statute Law Revision Act 1863 (26 & 27 Vict. c. 125), which came into force on 28 July 1863.

The whole act, so far as unrepealed, was repealed by section 1 of, and the first schedule to, the Statute Law Revision Act 1948 (11 & 12 Geo. 6. c. 62), which came into force on 30 July 1948.

Although already repealed, the whole act was repealed by section 80(7) of, and the thirteenth schedule to, the Representation of the People Act 1948 (11 & 12 Geo. 6. c. 65), which came into force on 30 July 1948.

== Bibliography ==
- 34 & 35 Hen. 8. c. 13, An Act for Knights and Burgesses to have Places in the Parliament for the County Palatine and City of Chester — in Raithby, John; Tomlins, Sir Thomas Edlyne (1811). The statutes at large, of England and of Great Britain: from Magna Carta to the union of the kingdoms of Great Britain and Ireland, Volume 3: 1509–53. London: Printed by George Eyre and Andrew Strahan. (Full text of the act as passed, from Google Books scan)
