= List of acts of the Parliament of England from 1488 =

This is a list of acts of the Parliament of England for the year 1488.

For acts passed during the period 1707–1800, see the list of acts of the Parliament of Great Britain. See also the list of acts of the Parliament of Scotland, and the list of acts of the Parliament of Ireland.

For acts passed from 1801 onwards, see the list of acts of the Parliament of the United Kingdom. For acts of the devolved parliaments and assemblies in the United Kingdom, see the list of acts of the Scottish Parliament, the list of acts of the Northern Ireland Assembly, and the list of acts and measures of Senedd Cymru; see also the list of acts of the Parliament of Northern Ireland.

For medieval statutes, etc. that are not considered to be acts of Parliament, see the list of English statutes.

See also the List of ordinances and acts of the Parliament of England, 1642–1660 for ordinances and acts passed by the Long Parliament and other bodies without royal assent, and which were not considered to be valid legislation following the Restoration in 1660.

The number shown after each act's title is its chapter number. Acts are cited using this number, preceded by the years of the reign during which the relevant parliamentary session was held; thus the Union with Ireland Act 1800 is cited as "39 & 40 Geo. 3. c. 67", meaning the 67th act passed during the session that started in the 39th year of the reign of George III and which finished in the 40th year of that reign. The modern convention is to use Arabic numerals in citations (thus "41 Geo. 3" rather than "41 Geo. III"). Acts of the last session of the Parliament of Great Britain and the first session of the Parliament of the United Kingdom are both cited as "41 Geo. 3".

Acts passed by the Parliament of England did not have a short title; however, some of these acts have subsequently been given a short title by acts of the Parliament of the United Kingdom, such as the Short Titles Act 1896 (59 & 60 Vict. c. 14).

Acts passed by the Parliament of England were deemed to have come into effect on the first day of the session in which they were passed. Because of this, the years given in the list below may in fact be the year before a particular act was passed.

== 4 Hen. 7 ==
The 3rd Parliament of King Henry VII, which met from 13 January 1489 until 27 February 1490.

This session was also traditionally cited as 4 H. 7, 4 & 5 Hen. 7 or 4 & 5 H. 7.

Short title	Citation	Royal assent
Long title
Commissions of Sewers Act 1488 (repealed)	4 Hen. 7. c. 1	27 February 1490
An Act for the graunting forth of Comyssions for Sewers. (Repealed for England and Wales by Statute Law Revision Act 1863 (26 & 27 Vict. c. 125) and for Ireland by Statute Law (Ireland) Revision Act 1872 (35 & 36 Vict. c. 98))
Gold and Silver Act 1488 (repealed)	4 Hen. 7. c. 2	27 February 1490
An Acte for fyners of Golde and Sylver. (Repealed by Repeal of Obsolete Statutes Act 1856 (19 & 20 Vict. c. 64))
Slaughter of Beasts Act 1488 (repealed)	4 Hen. 7. c. 3	27 February 1490
An Acte that noe Butcher slea any manner of beast within the Walles of London. (Repealed by Repeal of Obsolete Statutes Act 1856 (19 & 20 Vict. c. 64))
Protections Act 1488 (repealed)	4 Hen. 7. c. 4	27 February 1490
An Acte that all Persons serving the Kynge beyound the Sea in Bryttayne may have their proteccion of perfecture & moratur. (Repealed for England and Wales by Statute Law Revision Act 1863 (26 & 27 Vict. c. 125) and for Ireland by Statute Law (Ireland) Revision Act 1872 (35 & 36 Vict. c. 98))
Dismes Act 1488 (repealed)	4 Hen. 7. c. 5	27 February 1490
An Act to make voide lettres patents made to Abbotts Pryors & others for gathering and paying of dysmes. (Repealed for England and Wales by Statute Law Revision Act 1863 (26 & 27 Vict. c. 125) and for Ireland by Statute Law (Ireland) Revision Act 1872 (35 & 36 Vict. c. 98))
Forest of Inglewood Act 1488 (repealed)	4 Hen. 7. c. 6	27 February 1490
An Acte that the Office of Styward Forester keep of the Forest of Inglewood shalbe voide. (Repealed for England and Wales by Statute Law Revision Act 1863 (26 & 27 Vict. c. 125) and for Ireland by Statute Law (Ireland) Revision Act 1872 (35 & 36 Vict. c. 98))
Yeomen and Grooms of the Chamber Act 1488 (repealed)	4 Hen. 7. c. 7	27 February 1490
That all letters patentes made to Yomen of the Corone and Gromes of the Kyngis Chambre for lacke of their attendance be voyde. (Repealed for England and Wales by Statute Law Revision Act 1863 (26 & 27 Vict. c. 125) and for Ireland by Statute Law (Ireland) Revision Act 1872 (35 & 36 Vict. c. 98))
Woollen Cloth Act 1488 (repealed)	4 Hen. 7. c. 8	27 February 1490
Price of Wollen Cloth. (Repealed for England and Wales by Continuance, etc. of Laws Act 1623 (21 Jas. 1. c. 28) and for Ireland by Statute Law Revision Act 1958 (6 & 7 Eliz. 2. c. 46))
Hats and Caps Act 1488 or the Cappers Act 1488 (repealed)	4 Hen. 7. c. 9	27 February 1490
Hattes & Cappes. (Repealed for England and Wales by Continuance, etc. of Laws Act 1623 (21 Jas. 1. c. 28) and for Ireland by Statute Law Revision Act 1958 (6 & 7 Eliz. 2. c. 46))
Importations, etc. Act 1488 (repealed)	4 Hen. 7. c. 10	27 February 1490
An Act agaynst bringing into this Realm Wynes in forrayne bottomes. (Repealed by Repeal of Acts Concerning Importation Act 1822 (3 Geo. 4. c. 41))
Buying of Wool Act 1488 (repealed)	4 Hen. 7. c. 11	27 February 1490
An Acte for the mayntenaunce of Drapery and making of Cloth. (Repealed for England and Wales by Statute Law Revision Act 1863 (26 & 27 Vict. c. 125) and for Ireland by Statute Law (Ireland) Revision Act 1872 (35 & 36 Vict. c. 98))
Justice of the Peace Act 1488 (repealed)	4 Hen. 7. c. 12	27 February 1490
An Acte for Justices of Peace for the due execucion of their Comyssions. (Repealed for England and Wales by Statute Law Revision Act 1863 (26 & 27 Vict. c. 125) and for Ireland by Statute Law (Ireland) Revision Act 1872 (35 & 36 Vict. c. 98))
Benefit of Clergy Act 1488 (repealed)	4 Hen. 7. c. 13	27 February 1490
An Act to take awaye the benefytt of Clergye from certayne persons. (Repealed for England and Wales by Criminal Statutes Repeal Act 1827 (7 & 8 Geo. 4. c. 27), for Ireland by Criminal Statutes (Ireland) Repeal Act 1828 (9 Geo. 4. c. 53) and for India by Criminal Law (India) Act 1828 (9 Geo. 4. c. 74))
Crown Lands Act 1488 (repealed)	4 Hen. 7. c. 14	27 February 1490
Com Marchie. (Repealed by Statute Law (Repeals) Act 1977 (c. 18))
River Thames Act 1488 (repealed)	4 Hen. 7. c. 15	27 February 1490
An Act that the Mayor of London shall have the rule of the Ryver of Thames from Stanes (Note: Staines upon Thames) to Yenlade. (Note: Yantlet Creek) (Repealed by Statute Law (Repeals) Act 1977 (c. 18))
Isle of Wight Act 1488 (repealed)	4 Hen. 7. c. 16	27 February 1490
An Act concerning the Isle of Wight. (Repealed by Repeal of Obsolete Statutes Act 1856 (19 & 20 Vict. c. 64))
Wardship Act 1488 (repealed)	4 Hen. 7. c. 17	27 February 1490
An Act agaynst fraudulent feoffments tendinge to defraude the Kinge of his wardes. (Repealed for England and Wales by Statute Law Revision Act 1863 (26 & 27 Vict. c. 125) and for Ireland by Statute Law (Ireland) Revision Act 1872 (35 & 36 Vict. c. 98))
Treason Act 1488 (repealed)	4 Hen. 7. c. 18	27 February 1490
An Acte agaynst counterfeting of forrayne Coyne. (Repealed for England and Wales by Statute Law Revision Act 1863 (26 & 27 Vict. c. 125) and for Ireland by Statute Law (Ireland) Revision Act 1872 (35 & 36 Vict. c. 98))
Tillage Act 1488 or the Inclosure Act 1489 (repealed)	4 Hen. 7. c. 19	27 February 1490
An Acte agaynst pullyng doun of Tounes. (Repealed for England and Wales by Continuance, etc. of Laws Act 1623 (21 Jas. 1. c. 28) and for Ireland by Statute Law Revision Act 1958 (6 & 7 Eliz. 2. c. 46))
Collusive Actions Act 1488 (repealed)	4 Hen. 7. c. 20	27 February 1490
An Acte agaynst collusions and fayned accions. (Repealed by Statute Law Revision Act 1958 (6 & 7 Eliz. 2. c. 46))
Orford Haven (Illegal Fishing Nets) Act 1488 (repealed)	4 Hen. 7. c. 21	27 February 1490
An Act for the preservacion of the frye of Fyshe. (Repealed by Sea Fisheries Act 1868 (31 & 32 Vict. c. 45))
Gold Act 1488 (repealed)	4 Hen. 7. c. 22	27 February 1490
An Acte agaynst the deceyptfull waight and working of the golde of Venice Florence & Jeane. (Repealed for England and Wales by Statute Law Revision Act 1863 (26 & 27 Vict. c. 125) and for Ireland by Statute Law (Ireland) Revision Act 1872 (35 & 36 Vict. c. 98))
Exportation Act 1488 (repealed)	4 Hen. 7. c. 23	27 February 1490
An Acte agaynst carrying awaye of coyne plate vessells or Jewells out of this Realme. (Repealed for England and Wales by Statute Law Revision Act 1863 (26 & 27 Vict. c. 125) and for Ireland by Statute Law (Ireland) Revision Act 1872 (35 & 36 Vict. c. 98))
Fines Act 1488 (repealed)	4 Hen. 7. c. 24	27 February 1490
An Acte for proclamacions to be made upon Fynes. (Repealed for England and Wales by Statute Law Revision Act 1863 (26 & 27 Vict. c. 125) and for Ireland by Statute Law (Ireland) Revision Act 1872 (35 & 36 Vict. c. 98))
Inhabitants of the Town of Northampton Act 1489 (repealed)	4 Hen. 7. c. 0 Rot. Parl. vol. vi p. 431 (Note: Cited as Rot. Parl. vol. vi p. 431 in the Northampton Act 1988.)	27 February 1490
An Act for the Inhabitants of the Town of Northampton. (Repealed by Northampton Act 1988 (c. xxix))
Convent of the Monastery of Saint Andrew in Northampton Act 1489 (repealed)	4 Hen. 7. c. 0 Rot. Parl. vol. vi p. 434 (Note: Cited as Rot. Parl. vol. vi p. 434 in the Northampton Act 1988.)	27 February 1490
An Act for the Covent of the Monastery of Saint Andrew in Northampton. (Repealed by Northampton Act 1988 (c. xxix))

=== Sources ===
- "4° Hen. VII.". The Statutes of the Realm. Vol. 2: 1377 to 1509. pp. 524–548 – via HathiTrust.
- "Anno quarto Henrici VII". The Statutes at Large. Vol. 4 - 1 Richard III to 31 Henry VIII - 1483-4 to 1539. pp. 38–51 – via Internet Archive.
- "Anno quarto Henrici VII". The Statutes at Large. Vol. 4 - 1 Richard III to 31 Henry VIII - 1483-4 to 1539. pp. 38–51 – via Internet Archive.
- "Anno quarto Henrici VII". The Statutes at Large. Vol. 4 - 1 Richard III to 31 Henry VIII - 1483-4 to 1539. pp. 38–51 – via Internet Archive.
- Chronological Table of and Index to the Statutes. Vol. 1: To the End of the Session 59 Vict. Sess. 2 (1895) (13th ed.). London: Her Majesty's Stationery Office. 1896. p. 41 – via Google Books.
- Chronological Table of the Statutes: Covering the Period from 1235 to the End of 1971. London: Her Majesty's Stationery Office. 1972. p. 35. ISBN 978-0-11-840096-1 – via Google Books.

== See also ==
- List of acts of the Parliament of England
