= Herbalists Act 1542 =

Act of the Parliament of England

Herbalists Act 1542 (Note: The citation of this act by this short title was authorised by section 5 of, and the second schedule to, the Statute Law Revision Act 1948. Due to the repeal of those provisions, it is now authorised by section 19(2) of the Interpretation Act 1978.)
- Act of Parliament
- Parliament of England
- Long title: An Acte that persones being no commen Surgeons maie mynistre medicines owtwarde. (Note: These words are printed against this act in the second column of the second schedule to the Statute Law Revision Act 1948, which is headed "Title".)
- Citation: 34 & 35 Hen. 8. c. 8
- Territorial extent: England and Wales

Dates
- Royal assent: 12 May 1543
- Commencement: 3 November 1542 (Note: Start of session.)
- Repealed: 23 July 1958

Other legislation
- Repealed by: Statute Law Revision Act 1958
- Relates to: Physicians and Surgeons Act 1511

Status: Repealed

Text of statute as originally enacted

The Herbalists Act 1542 (34 & 35 Hen. 8. c. 8) was an act of the Parliament of England.

== Subsequent developments ==
The whole act was repealed by section 1 of, and the first schedule to, the Statute Law Revision Act 1958 (6 & 7 Eliz. 2. c. 46), which came into force on 23 July 1958.
