= Feigned Recoveries Act 1542 =

Act of the Parliament of England

Feigned Recoveries Act 1542 (Note: The citation of this act by this short title was authorised by section 5 of, and the second schedule to, the Statute Law Revision Act 1948. Due to the repeal of those provisions, it is now authorised by section 19(2) of the Interpretation Act 1978.)
- Act of Parliament
- Parliament of England
- Long title: An Acte to embarre fayned recoveries of Landes wherein the Kinges Majestie is in revercion. (Note: These words are printed against this act in the second column of the second schedule to the Statute Law Revision Act 1948, which is headed "Title".)
- Citation: 34 & 35 Hen. 8. c. 20
- Territorial extent: England and Wales

Dates
- Royal assent: 12 May 1543
- Commencement: 3 November 1542 (Note: Start of session.)
- Repealed: 1 January 1970
Other legislation
| Repealed by | Statute Law Revision Act 1888Statute Law (Repeals) Act 1969 |

Status: Repealed

Text of statute as originally enacted

The Feigned Recoveries Act 1542 (34 & 35 Hen. 8. c. 20) was an act of the Parliament of England.

== Subsequent developments ==
In this section, the words from "be it also" to "aforesaide" in section 2 of the act were repealed by section 1(1) of, and part I of the schedule to, the Statute Law Revision Act 1888 (51 & 52 Vict. c. 3), which came into force on 27 March 1888.

The whole act, so far as unrepealed, was repealed by section 1 of, and part III of the schedule to, the Statute Law (Repeals) Act 1969, which came into force on 1 January 1970.
