= Sunday Observance Act 1677 =

Act of the Parliament of England

Sunday Observance Act 1677 (Note: The citation of this act by this short title was authorised by section 1 of, and the first schedule to, the Short Titles Act 1896. Due to the repeal of those provisions it is now authorised by section 19(2) of the Interpretation Act 1978.)
- Act of Parliament
- Parliament of England
- Long title: An Act for the better Observation of the Lords Day commonly called Sunday. (Note: These words are printed against this act in the second column of the first schedule to the Short Titles Act 1896, which is headed "Title".)
- Citation: 29 Cha. 2. c. 7
- Territorial extent: England and Wales

Dates
- Royal assent: 16 April 1677
- Commencement: 15 February 1677 (Note: Start of session.)
- Repealed: 1 January 1970
Other legislation
Amended by	Sunday Observation Prosecution Act 1871; Statute Law Revision Act 1888; Rules of the Supreme Court (Revision) 1965
Repealed by	Statute Law Revision Act 1948; Justices of the Peace Act 1949; Statute Law (Repeals) Act 1969
Relates to	Sunday Observance Act 1627; Sunday Observance Act 1625

Status: Repealed

Text of statute as originally enacted

The Sunday Observance Act 1677 (29 Cha. 2. c. 7) was an act of the Parliament of England.

== Subsequent developments ==
Section 6 of the act was replaced by rule 10 of order 65 of the Rules of the Supreme Court (Revision) 1965 (SI 1965/1776) (1965 III, p. 4995), as substituted by rule 6(2) of the Rules of the Supreme Court (Amendment No. 2) 1969 (SI 1969/1894) (L 33).

The whole act, so far as unrepealed, was repealed by section 1 of, and part IV of the schedule to, the Statute Law (Repeals) Act 1969, which came into force on 1 January 1970.
