= Sunday Observance Act 1627 =

Act of the Parliament of England

Sunday Observance Act 1627 (Note: These words are printed against this act in column 2 of part III of schedule 7 to the Justices of the Peace Act 1949 (12, 13 & 14 Geo. 6. c. 101), which is headed "Title or Short Title".)
- Act of Parliament
- Parliament of England
- Long title: An Act for the further reformacion of sondry abuses committed on the Lordes Day commonlie called Sonday.
- Citation: 3 Cha. 1. c. 2
- Territorial extent: England and Wales

Dates
- Royal assent: 10 March 1629
- Commencement: 19 April 1629 (Note: Section 1. 40 days after the end of session.)
- Repealed: 1 January 1970
Other legislation
Amended by	Statute Law Revision Act 1863; Public Authorities Protection Act 1893
Repealed by	Statute Law Revision Act 1948; Justices of the Peace Act 1949; Statute Law Revision Act 1958; Ecclesiastical Jurisdiction Measure 1963; Statute Law (Repeals) Act 1969
Relates to	Sunday Observance Act 1625; Sunday Observance Act 1677

Status: Repealed

Text of statute as originally enacted

The Sunday Observance Act 1627 (3 Cha. 1. c. 2) was an act of the Parliament of England.

== Subsequent developments ==
The words "This act to continue to the end of the first Session of the next Parliament" at the end of the act were repealed by section 1 of, and the schedule to, the Statute Law Revision Act 1863 (26 & 27 Vict. c. 125), which came into force on 28 July 1863.

The words from "that such bill plaint or information" to "Provided further." were repealed by section 2 of, and the schedule to, the Public Authorities Protection Act 1893 (56 & 57 Vict. c. 61), which came into force on 1 January 1894.

The words of commencement and the words "by any constable or churchwarden" were repealed by section 1 of, and the first schedule to, the Statute Law Revision Act 1948 (11 & 12 Geo. 6. c. 62), which came into force on 30 July 1948.

The words from "All which forfeitures" to "forfeiture" were repealed by section 46(2) of, and part III of schedule 7 to, the Justices of the Peace Act 1949 (12, 13 & 14 Geo. 6. c. 101), which came into force on 16 December 1949. This repeal was specifically enacted through section 46(2) of the act, along with part III of schedule 7, which collectively removed these provisions from the legal framework, reflecting changes in legislative priorities or legal practices at the time.

The second proviso of the act was repealed by section 3 of, and the third schedule to, the Statute Law Revision Act 1958 (6 & 7 Eliz. 2. c. 46), which came into force on 23 July 1958. The 1958 act provided that the act was to cease to have effect in so far as it entitled persons to plead the general issue in civil proceedings.

The third proviso was repealed by section 87 of, and the fifth schedule to, the Ecclesiastical Jurisdiction Measure 1963 (No. 1), which came into force on 1 March 1965.

The whole act, so far as unrepealed, was repealed by section 1 of, and part IV of the schedule to, the Statute Law (Repeals) Act 1969, which came into force on 1 January 1970.

== See also ==
- Sunday Observance Act 1625
