= List of acts of the Parliament of England from 1542 =

This is a list of acts of the Parliament of England for the year 1542.

For acts passed during the period 1707–1800, see the list of acts of the Parliament of Great Britain. See also the list of acts of the Parliament of Scotland, and the list of acts of the Parliament of Ireland.

For acts passed from 1801 onwards, see the list of acts of the Parliament of the United Kingdom. For acts of the devolved parliaments and assemblies in the United Kingdom, see the list of acts of the Scottish Parliament, the list of acts of the Northern Ireland Assembly, and the list of acts and measures of Senedd Cymru; see also the list of acts of the Parliament of Northern Ireland.

For medieval statutes, etc. that are not considered to be acts of Parliament, see the list of English statutes.

See also the List of ordinances and acts of the Parliament of England, 1642–1660 for ordinances and acts passed by the Long Parliament and other bodies without royal assent, and which were not considered to be valid legislation following the Restoration in 1660.

The number shown after each act's title is its chapter number. Acts are cited using this number, preceded by the years of the reign during which the relevant parliamentary session was held; thus the Union with Ireland Act 1800 is cited as "39 & 40 Geo. 3. c. 67", meaning the 67th act passed during the session that started in the 39th year of the reign of George III and which finished in the 40th year of that reign. The modern convention is to use Arabic numerals in citations (thus "41 Geo. 3" rather than "41 Geo. III"). Acts of the last session of the Parliament of Great Britain and the first session of the Parliament of the United Kingdom are both cited as "41 Geo. 3".

Acts passed by the Parliament of England did not have a short title; however, some of these acts have subsequently been given a short title by acts of the Parliament of the United Kingdom, such as the Short Titles Act 1896 (59 & 60 Vict. c. 14).

Acts passed by the Parliament of England were deemed to have come into effect on the first day of the session in which they were passed. Because of this, the years given in the list below may in fact be the year before a particular act was passed.

== 34 & 35 Hen. 8 ==
The second session of the 8th Parliament of King Henry VIII, which met from 3 November 1542 until 12 May 1543.

This session was also traditionally cited as 34 & 35 H. 8.

=== Public acts ===
Short title	Citation	Royal assent
Long title
Advancement of True Religion Act 1542 (repealed)	34 & 35 Hen. 8. c. 1	12 May 1543
An Act for the Advancement of true Religion, and for the Abolishment of the contrary. (Repealed by Treason Act 1547 (1 Edw. 6. c. 12))
Public Accountant Act 1542 (repealed)	34 & 35 Hen. 8. c. 2	12 May 1543
An Act concerning Collectors and Receivers. (Repealed by Statute Law Revision Act 1958 (6 & 7 Eliz. 2. c. 46))
Assize of Wood and Coals Act 1542 (repealed)	34 & 35 Hen. 8. c. 3	12 May 1543
An Act for the Assise of Coal and Wood. (Repealed by Assize of Fuel Act 1553 (7 Edw. 6. c. 7))
Bankruptcy Act 1542 or the Statute of Bankrupts (repealed)	34 & 35 Hen. 8. c. 4	12 May 1543
An Act against such Persons as do make Bankrupt. (Repealed by Bankruptcy Act 1825 (6 Geo. 4. c. 16))
Wills Act 1542 or the Statute of Wills 1542 (repealed)	34 & 35 Hen. 8. c. 5	12 May 1543
An Act for the Explanation of the Statute of Wills. (Note: Statute of Wills (32 Hen. 8. c. 1)) (Repealed by Wills Act 1837 (7 Will. 4 & 1 Vict. c. 26))
Pins Act 1542 or Statute of Pinners or Statute for Pinners (repealed)	34 & 35 Hen. 8. c. 6	12 May 1543
An Act for the true making of Pins. (Repealed by Statute for Pinners Repeal Act 1545 (37 Hen. 8. c. 13))
Wines Act 1542 (repealed)	34 & 35 Hen. 8. c. 7	12 May 1543
An Act to authorise certain of the King's Majesty's Council to set Prices upon Wines to be sold by Retail. (Repealed by Statute Law Revision Act 1863 (26 & 27 Vict. c. 125))
Herbalists Act 1542 (repealed)	34 & 35 Hen. 8. c. 8	12 May 1543
An Act that Persons being no common Surgeons, may administer outward Medicines. (Repealed by Statute Law Revision Act 1958 (6 & 7 Eliz. 2. c. 46))
Unloading of Ballast, etc. from Ships Act 1542 (repealed)	34 & 35 Hen. 8. c. 9	12 May 1543
An Act for the Preservation of the River of Severn. (Repealed by Statute Law Revision Act 1958 (6 & 7 Eliz. 2. c. 46))
Coverlets Act 1542 (repealed)	34 & 35 Hen. 8. c. 10	12 May 1543
An Act for the true making of Coverlets in York. (Repealed by Repeal of Obsolete Statutes Act 1856 (19 & 20 Vict. c. 64))
Welsh Frises and Cottons Act 1542 (repealed)	34 & 35 Hen. 8. c. 11	12 May 1543
An Act for the true making of Frises and Cottons in Wales. (Repealed by Statute Law Revision Act 1863 (26 & 27 Vict. c. 125))
London and Westminster Paving Act 1542 (repealed)	34 & 35 Hen. 8. c. 12	12 May 1543
An Act for the paving of certain Lanes and Streets in London and Westminster. (Repealed by Statute Law Revision Act 1948 (11 & 12 Geo. 6. c. 62))
Chester and Cheshire (Constituencies) Act 1542 (repealed)	34 & 35 Hen. 8. c. 13	12 May 1543
An Act for Knights and Burgesses to have Places in the Parliament for the County Palatine and City of Chester. (Repealed by Representation of the People Act 1948 (11 & 12 Geo. 6. c. 65))
Criminal Law Act 1542 (repealed)	34 & 35 Hen. 8. c. 14	12 May 1543
An Act for the Certificate of Convicts to be made into the King's Bench. (Repealed for England and Wales by Criminal Statutes Repeal Act 1827 (7 & 8 Geo. 4. c. 27) and for India by Criminal Law (India) Act 1828 (9 Geo. 4. c. 74))
Dean and Chapter of Wells Act 1542	34 & 35 Hen. 8. c. 15	12 May 1543
An Act touching the Dean and Chapter of Wells, to be one sole Chapter of itself.
Sheriffs Act 1542 (repealed)	34 & 35 Hen. 8. c. 16	12 May 1543
An Act for Sheriffs to be discharged upon their Accounts, and to have Allowances for their reasonable Expences in the Court of Exchequer. (Repealed by Statute Law Revision Act 1863 (26 & 27 Vict. c. 125))
Tenths Payable by Certain Bishops Act 1542 (repealed)	34 & 35 Hen. 8. c. 17	12 May 1543
An Act for the new-erected Bishops to pay their Tenths into the Court of the First-fruits. (Repealed by Statute Law Revision Act 1948 (11 & 12 Geo. 6. c. 62))
Canterbury Liberties Act 1542	34 & 35 Hen. 8. c. 18	12 May 1543
An Act for Canterbury, concerning the Privileges of the same.
Religious Houses Act 1542 (repealed)	34 & 35 Hen. 8. c. 19	12 May 1543
An Act for the Payment of Pensions and Portions granted out of the late Abbies. (Repealed by Statute Law (Repeals) Act 1989 (c. 43))
Feigned Recoveries Act 1542 (repealed)	34 & 35 Hen. 8. c. 20	12 May 1543
An Act to embar feigned Recovery of Lands wherein the King's Majesty is in Reversion. (Repealed by Statute Law Revision Act 1888 (51 & 52 Vict. c. 3) and Statute Law (Repeals) Act 1969 (c. 52))
Confirmation of Grants Act 1542 (repealed)	34 & 35 Hen. 8. c. 21	12 May 1543
An Act for the Confirmation of Letters Patents; notwithstanding misnaming of any Thing contained in the same. (Repealed by Statute Law (Repeals) Act 1978 (c. 45))
Fines of Lands Act 1542 (repealed)	34 & 35 Hen. 8. c. 22	12 May 1543
An Act that Fines in Towns Corporate shall be made as the same have been in Times past. (Repealed by Statute Law Revision Act 1863 (26 & 27 Vict. c. 125))
Proclamations Act 1542 (repealed)	34 & 35 Hen. 8. c. 23	12 May 1543
An Act for the due Execution of Proclamations. (Repealed by Treason Act 1547 (1 Edw. 6. c. 12))
Sheriff of Cambridgeshire and Payment of Members Act 1542 (repealed)	34 & 35 Hen. 8. c. 24	12 May 1543
An Act for the Assurance of certain Lands to John Hinde, Sergeant at Law. (Repealed by Statute Law Revision Act 1948 (11 & 12 Geo. 6. c. 62))
Windmill, etc. at Poole Act 1542	34 & 35 Hen. 8. c. 25	12 May 1543
An Act for the Edification of a Windmill, and a Conduit at the King's Majesty's Town of Poole.
Laws in Wales Act 1542 or the Act of Union 1542 (repealed)	34 & 35 Hen. 8. c. 26	12 May 1543
An Act for certain Ordinances in the King's Majesty's Dominion and Principality of Wales. (Repealed by Statute Law (Repeals) Act 1969 (c. 52), Welsh Language Act 1993 (c. 38) and Sale of Goods (Amendment) Act 1994 (c. 32))
Taxation Act 1542 (repealed)	34 & 35 Hen. 8. c. 27	12 May 1543
An Act for the Subsidy of the Temporalty. (Repealed by Statute Law Revision Act 1863 (26 & 27 Vict. c. 125))
Taxation (No. 2) Act 1542 (repealed)	34 & 35 Hen. 8. c. 28	12 May 1543
An Act for the Subsidy of the Clergy granted of both Provinces, Canterbury and York. (Repealed by Statute Law Revision Act 1863 (26 & 27 Vict. c. 125))

=== Private acts ===
Short title	Citation	Royal assent
Long title
Exchange of the Manor of Clerkenwell between King and Duke of Norfolk.	34 & 35 Hen. 8. c. 29 Pr. (Note: This is the citation in The Statutes of the Realm.); 34 & 35 Hen. 8. c. 1 Pr. (Note: This is the citation in The Statutes at Large.)	12 May 1543
An Act of Exchange of the Manor of Clerkenwell, between the King's Majesty and the Duke of Norff.
Assurance of the Treasureship of Sarum Cathedral to Thomas Robertson and of the Archdeaconry of Taunton to John Redman.	34 & 35 Hen. 8. c. 30 Pr. 34 & 35 Hen. 8. c. 2 Pr.	12 May 1543
An Act for the Treasurership of the Cathedral Church of Sar. to be assured to Dr. Robertson, and also for the Assurance of the Archdeaconry of Taunton to Dr. Redman.
Denization of Thomas Brandoling's children.	34 & 35 Hen. 8. c. 31 Pr. 34 & 35 Hen. 8. c. 3 Pr.	12 May 1543
An Act for the making Denizens two Children of Thomas Brandoling.
Restitution in blood and name of Walter Hungerford and Edward Nevill.	34 & 35 Hen. 8. c. 32 Pr. 34 & 35 Hen. 8. c. 4 Pr.	12 May 1543
An Act of Restitution in Name and Blood to Walter Hungreforde and Edward Nevile.
Denization of William Maye's children.	34 & 35 Hen. 8. c. 33 Pr. 34 & 35 Hen. 8. c. 5 Pr.	12 May 1543
An Act for making Free Denizens the Children of William Maye.
Denization of Robert Dethick's children.	34 & 35 Hen. 8. c. 34 Pr. 34 & 35 Hen. 8. c. 6 Pr.	12 May 1543
An Act for the three Children of Robert Dethicke, to be made Denizens.
Assurance of the Clerkship of the Treasury and Warrants in the King's Bench to John Payne.	34 & 35 Hen. 8. c. 35 Pr. 34 & 35 Hen. 8. c. 7 Pr.	12 May 1543
An Act for the Assurances of the Clerkship of the Treasury and Warrants in the King's Bench to John Payne, during his Life.
Grant of Parsonage of Strubby to Lincoln Cathedral.	34 & 35 Hen. 8. c. 36 Pr. 34 & 35 Hen. 8. c. 8 Pr.	12 May 1543
An Act for the Impropriation of the Parsonage of Strubbye, in Lincolnshire, to the Dean and Chapter of Lincoln.
Exchange between Archbishop of Canterbury, John Gage and Thomas Culpepper.	34 & 35 Hen. 8. c. 37 Pr. 34 & 35 Hen. 8. c. 9 Pr.	12 May 1543
An Act for the Exchange of certain Lands, between the most Reverend Father in God the Archbishop of Caunterburye, Sir John Gage, Knight, and Thomas Culpepp', Esquire.
Assurance of Anne Sidney's jointure.	34 & 35 Hen. 8. c. 38 Pr. 34 & 35 Hen. 8. c. 10 Pr.	12 May 1543
An Act for the Assurance of a Joynture to Anne Sidney.
John Strelley's Estate Act 1524	34 & 35 Hen. 8. c. 39 Pr. 34 & 35 Hen. 8. c. 11 Pr.	12 May 1543
An Act for the Lands of John Strelleye, to be divided amongst his Daughters.
Elisabeth Burgh's children: deeming them illegitimate.	34 & 35 Hen. 8. c. 40 Pr. 34 & 35 Hen. 8. c. 12 Pr.	12 May 1543
An Act declaring the Children of Elizabeth Burghe to be Bastards.
Assignment of Lady Cobham's jointure.	34 & 35 Hen. 8. c. 41 Pr. 34 & 35 Hen. 8. c. 13 Pr.	12 May 1543
An Act for the Assignment of the Lady Cobham's Jointure.
Hugh Dennis' inheritance and Magdalen College Cambridge's annuity.	34 & 35 Hen. 8. c. 42 Pr. 34 & 35 Hen. 8. c. 15 Pr.	12 May 1543
An Act for the Assurance of the Inheritance of Hughe Denys.
Lady Parr's Children Illegitimacy Act 1542	34 & 35 Hen. 8. c. 43 Pr. 34 & 35 Hen. 8. c. 16 Pr.	12 May 1543
An Act for the Bastardy of the Lady Parre's Children.
Lady Draycot's Estate Act 1542	34 & 35 Hen. 8. c. 44 Pr. 34 & 35 Hen. 8. c. 17 Pr.	12 May 1543
An Act concerning certain Lands to be assured to the Heirs of the Lady Draicote.
Southwell Collegiate Church Act 1542	34 & 35 Hen. 8. c. 45 Pr. 34 & 35 Hen. 8. c. 18 Pr.	12 May 1543
An Act for the Confirmation of the Collegiate Church of Sowthwell, in the County of Nott.
Sir Roger Lewkenor's Estate Act 1542	34 & 35 Hen. 8. c. 46 Pr. 34 & 35 Hen. 8. c. 19 Pr.	12 May 1543
An Act for the Determination of all Controversies between Sir William Barentyne and Sir Roger Lewkener, Knights.
Exchange between Bishop of Norwich and Thomas Paston.	34 & 35 Hen. 8. c. 47 Pr. 34 & 35 Hen. 8. c. 20 Pr.	12 May 1543
An Act for an Exchange of certain Lands between the Bishop of Norwiche and Thomas Paston, Esquire, one of the Gentlemen of the King's Majesty's Privy Chamber.
Exchange between King and Bryan Tuke.	34 & 35 Hen. 8. c. 48 Pr. 34 & 35 Hen. 8. c. 21 Pr.	12 May 1543
An Act for the Exchange of certain Lands between the King's Majesty and Sir Bryane Tuke, Knight.

=== Sources ===
- "34° & 35° Hen. VIII". The Statutes of the Realm. Vol. 3: 1509 to 1547. pp. 893–953 – via HathiTrust.
- "Anno tricesimo quarto & quinto Henrici VIII". The Statutes at Large. Vol. 5 – 32 Henry VIII to 7 Edward VI – 1540 to 1552–3. pp. 129–191 – via Internet Archive.
- "Acts of the English Parliament from 1542". legislation.gov.uk. The National Archives.
- Journal of the House of Lords. Vol. 1: 1509-1577. London: His Majesty's Stationery Office. 1830 – via British History Online.
- Chronological Table of and Index to the Statutes. Vol. 1: To the End of the Session 59 Vict. Sess. 2 (1895) (13th ed.). London: Her Majesty's Stationery Office. 1896. pp. 52–53 – via Google Books.
- Chronological Table of the Statutes: Covering the Period from 1235 to the End of 1971. London: Her Majesty's Stationery Office. 1972. pp. 49–50. ISBN 978-0-11-840096-1 – via Google Books.
- "Chronological Tables of the Private and Personal Acts: Part 1 (1539–1601)". legislation.gov.uk. The National Archives.

== See also ==
- List of acts of the Parliament of England
