= Treason Act 1488 =

Act of the Parliament of England

- Act of Parliament
- Parliament of England
- Long title: An Acte agaynst counterfeting of forrayne Coyne.
- Citation: 4 Hen. 7. c. 18
- Territorial extent: England and Wales; Ireland

Dates
- Royal assent: 27 February 1490
- Commencement: 13 January 1489 (Note: Start of session.)
- Repealed: England and Wales: 28 July 1863; Ireland: 10 August 1872

Other legislation
- Amended by: Treason Act 1553; Treason (No. 2) Act 1553
- Repealed by: England and Wales: Statute Law Revision Act 1863; Ireland: Statute Law (Ireland) Revision Act 1872

Status: Repealed

Text of statute as originally enacted

The Treason Act 1488 (4 Hen. 7. c. 18) was an act of the Parliament of England passed in 1488.

The act made it high treason to counterfeit coinage from other countries. It was already treason to counterfeit English coins, under the Treason Act 1351 (25 Edw. 3 Stat. 5. c. 2).

== Subsequent developments ==
The act was extended to Ireland by Poynings' Law 1495 (10 Hen. 7. c. 22 (I)).

The act was repealed by the Treason Act 1553 (1 Mar. Sess. 1. c.1) but the offence was created by another act passed later in the same year which recreated the offence, the Treason (No. 2) Act 1553 (1 Mar. Sess. 2 c. 6).

The whole act was repealed for England and Wales by section 1 of, and the schedule to, the Statute Law Revision Act 1863 (26 & 27 Vict. c. 125), which came into force on 28 July 1863.

The whole act was repealed for Ireland by section 1 of, and the schedule to, the Statute Law (Ireland) Revision Act 1872 (35 & 36 Vict. c. 98), which came into force on 10 August 1872.

== See also ==
- High treason in the United Kingdom
