= Collusive Actions Act 1488 =

Act of the Parliament of England

Collusive Actions Act 148 (Note: The citation of this act by this short title was authorised by section 5 of, and the second schedule to, the Statute Law Revision Act 1948. Due to the repeal of those provisions, it is now authorised by section 19(2) of the Interpretation Act 1978.) (Note: The citation of this act as the Collusive Actions Act 1488 is authorised for the Republic of Ireland by section 4(a) of, and part 2 of schedule 1 to, the Statute Law Revision Act 2007.)
- Act of Parliament
- Parliament of England
- Long title: An Acte agaynst collusions and fayned accions. (Note: These words are printed against this act in the second column of the second schedule to the Statute Law Revision Act 1948, which is headed "Title".)
- Citation: 4 Hen. 7. c. 20
- Territorial extent: England and Wales; Ireland

Dates
- Royal assent: 27 February 1490
- Commencement: 13 January 1489 (Note: Start of session.)
- Repealed: 23 July 1958
Other legislation
Amended by	Statute Law Revision Act 1948
Repealed by	Statute Law Revision Act 1958

Status: Repealed

Text of statute as originally enacted

The Collusive Actions Act 1488 (4 Hen. 7. c. 20) was an act of the Parliament of England.

== Subsequent developments ==
The words from "and over that be it enacted and ordeyned" to "woll sue in that behalf" were repealed by section 1 of, and schedule 1 to, the Statute Law Revision Act 1948 (11 & 12 Geo. 6. c. 62).

The whole act was repealed by section 1 of, and schedule 1 to, the Statute Law Revision Act 1958 (6 & 7 Eliz. 2. c. 46).

== Eire ==
The act was retained for the Republic of Ireland by section 2(2)(a) of, and part 2 of schedule 1 to, the Statute Law Revision Act 2007.
