= Sunday Observance Act 1625 =

Act of the Parliament of England

Sunday Observance Act 1625 (Note: The citation of this act by this short title was authorised by section 1 of, and the first schedule to, the Short Titles Act 1896. Due to the repeal of those provisions it is now authorised by section 19(2) of the Interpretation Act 1978.)
- Act of Parliament
- Parliament of England
- Long title: An Act for punishing divers abuses committed on the Lord's day, called Sunday.
- Citation: 1 Cha. 1. c. 1
- Territorial extent: England and Wales

Dates
- Royal assent: 12 August 1625
- Commencement: 21 September 1625 (Note: Section 1. 40 days after the end of the session.)
- Repealed: 1 January 1970
Other legislation
Amended by	Continuance of Laws, etc. Act 1627; Statute Law Revision Act 1863
Repealed by	Statute Law Revision Act 1948; Justices of the Peace Act 1949; Statute Law Revision Act 1958; Ecclesiastical Jurisdiction Measure 1963; Statute Law (Repeals) Act 1969

Status: Repealed

Text of statute as originally enacted

The Sunday Observance Act 1625 (1 Cha. 1. c. 1) was an act of the Parliament of England.

The act banned participation in such activities as "bearbaiting, bullbaiting, Interludes, common Plays, and other unlawful exercises and pastimes" on Sundays. It was originally only to continue in force until the next session of Parliament.

== Subsequent developments ==
The whole act was continued until the end of the first session of the next parliament by section 3 of the Continuance of Laws, etc. Act 1627 (3 Cha. 1 . c. 5), which came into force on 17 March 1628.

The words "This act to continue to the end of the first Session of the next Parliament" at the end of the act were repealed by section 1 of, and the schedule to, the Statute Law Revision Act 1863 (26 & 27 Vict. c. 125), which came into force on 28 July 1863.

The words of commencement, the words from "to the constables or churchwardens" to "shall be committed" and the words from "and in default of such distress" to "space of three hours" were repealed by section 1 of, and the first schedule to, the Statute Law Revision Act 1948 (11 & 12 Geo. 6. c. 62), which came into force on 30 July 1948.

The words "the same to be employed and converted to the use of the poor of the parish where such offence shall be committed" were repealed by section 46(2) of, and part III of schedule 7 to, the Justices of the Peace Act 1949 ( 12, 13 & 14 Geo. 6. c. 101), which came into force on 16 December 1949.

The words from " and that if any man " to " evidence " were repealed by section 3 of, and the third schedule to, the Statute Law Revision Act 1958 (6 & 7 Eliz. 2. c. 46), which came into force on 23 July 1958. The 1958 act provided that the act was to cease to have effect in so far as it entitled persons to plead the general issue in civil proceedings.

The second proviso of the act was repealed by section 87 of, and the fifth schedule to, the Ecclesiastical Jurisdiction Measure 1963 (No. 1), which came into force on 1 March 1965.

The whole act, so far as unrepealed, was repealed by section 1 of, and part IV of the schedule to, the Statute Law (Repeals) Act 1969, which came into force on 1 January 1970.
