= Benefices (Ireland) Act 1826 =

Act of the Parliament of the United Kingdom

- Act of Parliament
- Parliament of the United Kingdom
- Long title: An Act to consolidate the Laws in force in Ireland for the Disappropriation of Benefices annexed to Dignities, and for the Appropriation of others in their Stead, and for uniting Benefices with Dignities, and to make further Provisions for the like Purposes.
- Citation: 7 Geo. 4. c. 73
- Territorial extent: United Kingdom

Dates
- Royal assent: 31 May 1826
- Commencement: 31 May 1826 (Note: The Acts of Parliament (Commencement) Act 1793.)
Other legislation
Amends	See § Repealed enactments
Relates to	Church of Ireland Act 1824

Status: Current legislation

Text of statute as originally enacted

The Benefices (Ireland) Act 1826 (7 Geo. 4. c. 73) is an act of the Parliament of the United Kingdom that consolidated enactments related to the appropriation and disappropriation of benefices in Ireland.

== Provisions ==
=== Repealed enactments ===
Section 1 of the act repealed 4 enactments, listed in that section.

Citation	Short title	Description	Extent of repeal
2 Geo. 1. c. 14 (I)	Parish Union and Division Act 1715	An Act for real Union and Division of Parishes.	As relates to the uniting or appropriating of any Benefice or Benefices to any Dignity or Prebend, or as relates to any Dignitary or Prebendary to whose Dignity or Prebend any Benefice shall be united, or as relates to the Disappropriation of any Rectory by the Owner or Proprietor of any Rectory Appropriate, or as relates to the Enrolment of any Appropriations.
10 Geo. 1. c. 6 (I)	Parish Union and Division Amendment Act 1723	An Act for explaining and amending an Act, intituled An Act for real Union and Division of Parishes; and for confirming an Exchange made of a Piece of Ground, whereon the Parish Church and Vicarage House of the Parish of Saint Anne in the Suburbs of the City of Dublin was by a former Act of Parliament directed to be built, for another Piece of Ground; and for appropriating such other Piece of Ground to the same Uses.	As relates to the uniting or appropriating of any Benefice or Benefices to any Dignity or Prebend, or to the Consent of His Majesty, His Heirs and Successors, to any such Union.
10 Geo. 1. c. 7 (I)	First Fruits Amendment Act 1723	An Act for amending an Act, intituled An Act for confirming the several Grants made by Her late Majesty of the First Fruits and Twentieth Parts, payable out of the Ecclesiastical Benefices in this Kingdom; and also for giving the Archbishops and other Ecclesiastical Persons Four Years Time for the Payment of First Fruits, and for incorporating the Trustees and Commissioners of the said First Fruits.	As relates to the Payment of First Fruits by appropriated Benefices.
21 Geo. 2. c. 8 (I)	Benefices and Cathedrals (Ireland) Act 1747	An Act for disappropriating Benefices belonging to Deans, Archdeacons, Dignitaries, and other Members of Cathedral Churches, and for appropriating others in their Stead; and also for the Removal of the Scites of ruined Cathedral Churches.	As relates to the Disappropriation of Benefices belonging to Deans, Archdeacons, Dignitaries, and other Members of Cathedral Churches, and the Appropriation of others in their Stead, and as relates to the Consent of His Majesty, His Heirs and Successors, to the making of any Union, Appropriation, or Disappropriation.
