= List of acts of the Parliament of the United Kingdom from 1826 =

This is a complete list of acts of the Parliament of the United Kingdom for the year 1826.

Note that the first parliament of the United Kingdom was held in 1801; parliaments between 1707 and 1800 were either parliaments of Great Britain or of Ireland). For acts passed up until 1707, see the list of acts of the Parliament of England and the list of acts of the Parliament of Scotland. For acts passed from 1707 to 1800, see the list of acts of the Parliament of Great Britain. See also the list of acts of the Parliament of Ireland.

For acts of the devolved parliaments and assemblies in the United Kingdom, see the list of acts of the Scottish Parliament, the list of acts of the Northern Ireland Assembly, and the list of acts and measures of Senedd Cymru; see also the list of acts of the Parliament of Northern Ireland.

The number shown after each act's title is its chapter number. Acts passed before 1963 are cited using this number, preceded by the year(s) of the reign during which the relevant parliamentary session was held; thus the Union with Ireland Act 1800 is cited as "39 & 40 Geo. 3 c. 67", meaning the 67th act passed during the session that started in the 39th year of the reign of George III and which finished in the 40th year of that reign. Note that the modern convention is to use Arabic numerals in citations (thus "41 Geo. 3" rather than "41 Geo. III"). Acts of the last session of the Parliament of Great Britain and the first session of the Parliament of the United Kingdom are both cited as "41 Geo. 3". Acts passed from 1963 onwards are simply cited by calendar year and chapter number.

All modern acts have a short title, e.g. the Local Government Act 2003. Some earlier acts also have a short title given to them by later acts, such as by the Short Titles Act 1896.

== 7 Geo. 4 ==
The seventh session of the 7th Parliament of the United Kingdom, which met from 2 February 1826 until 31 May 1826.

This session was also traditionally cited as 7 G. 4.

=== Public general acts ===
Short title	Citation	Royal assent
Long title
Supply Act 1826 (repealed)	7 Geo. 4. c. 1	1 March 1826
An Act for granting and applying certain Sums of Money for the Service of the Year One thousand eight hundred and twenty six. (Repealed by Statute Law Revision Act 1873 (36 & 37 Vict. c. 91))
Exchequer Bills Act 1826 (repealed)	7 Geo. 4. c. 2	1 March 1826
An Act for raising the Sum of Ten Millions by Exchequer Bills, for the Service of the Year One thousand eight hundred and twenty six. (Repealed by Statute Law Revision Act 1873 (36 & 37 Vict. c. 91))
Indemnity Act 1826 (repealed)	7 Geo. 4. c. 3	22 March 1826
An Act to indemnify such Persons in the United Kingdom as have omitted to qualify themselves for Offices and Employments, and for extending the Time limited for those Purposes respectively. (Repealed by Promissory Oaths Act 1871 (34 & 35 Vict. c. 48))
Salaries of Bishops, etc., in West Indies Act 1826 (repealed)	7 Geo. 4. c. 4	22 March 1826
An Act to amend an Act of the last Session of Parliament, (Note: West Indian Bishops, etc. Act 1825 (6 Geo. 4. c. 88)) for making Provision for the Salaries of certain Bishops, and other Ecclesiastical Dignitaries and Ministers in the Diocese of Jamaica, and in the Diocese of Barbadoes and the Leeward Islands, and for enabling His Majesty to grant Annuities to such Bishops upon the Resignation of their Offices. (Repealed by Statute Law Revision Act 1874 (37 & 38 Vict. c. 35))
Shipping Under Treaties of Commerce Act 1826 (repealed)	7 Geo. 4. c. 5	22 March 1826
An Act to give effect to Treaties of Commerce with Countries in America not at present provided with National Merchant Shipping. (Repealed by Statute Law Revision Act 1873 (36 & 37 Vict. c. 91))
Bank Notes Act 1826 (repealed)	7 Geo. 4. c. 6	22 March 1826
An Act to limit, and alter a certain Period to prohibit, the issuing of Promissory Notes under a limited Sum in England. (Repealed by Statute Law (Repeals) Act 1989 (c. 43))
Advances by Bank of England Act 1826 (repealed)	7 Geo. 4. c. 7	22 March 1826
An Act to facilitate the advancing of Money by the Governor and Company of the Bank of England upon Deposits or Pledges. (Repealed by Statute Law Revision Act 1873 (36 & 37 Vict. c. 91))
Juries (Scotland) Act 1826	7 Geo. 4. c. 8	22 March 1826
An Act to amend so much of an Act of the last Session of Parliament, (Note: Jurors (Scotland) Act 1825 (6 Geo. 4. c. 22)) for regulating the Qualification and the Manner of enrolling Jurors in Scotland, and of choosing Jurors in Criminal Trials there, and to unite counties for the purposes of Trial in Cases of High Treason in Scotland, as relates to the Qualification of Special Jurors.
Hard Labour (Ireland) Act 1826 (repealed)	7 Geo. 4. c. 9	22 March 1826
An Act to provide for the more effectual Punishment of certain Offences in Ireland, by Imprisonment with Hard Labour. (Repealed by Criminal Statutes (Ireland) Repeal Act 1828 (9 Geo. 4. c. 53), Offences Against the Person (Ireland) Act 1829 (10 Geo. 4. c. 34), Coinage Offences Act 1832 (2 & 3 Will. 4. c. 34) and Statute Law Revision Act (Northern Ireland) 1954 (c. 35 (N.I.)))
Mutiny Act 1826 (repealed)	7 Geo. 4. c. 10	22 March 1826
An Act for punishing Mutiny and Desertion; and for the better Payment of the Army and their Quarters. (Repealed by Statute Law Revision Act 1873 (36 & 37 Vict. c. 91))
Marine Mutiny Act 1826 (repealed)	7 Geo. 4. c. 11	22 March 1826
An Act for the regulating of His Majesty's Royal Marine Forces while on Shore. (Repealed by Statute Law Revision Act 1873 (36 & 37 Vict. c. 91))
Lands of Dallas (Receiver-General) Act 1826 (repealed)	7 Geo. 4. c. 12	22 March 1826
An Act for exonerating a certain Estate called Maes Llemystin, situate in the Parish of Llangadfan (Note: Llangadfan is in Powys, Wales.) in the County of Montgomery, belonging to Charles Dallas Esquire, from the Claims of the Crown. (Repealed by Statute Law Revision Act 1950 (14 Geo. 6. c. 6))
Site for Record Office (Ireland) Act 1826 (repealed)	7 Geo. 4. c. 13	11 April 1826
An Act to alter and amend an Act passed in the Fifty fourth Year of the Reign of His late Majesty King George the Third, (Note: Dublin Site of Record Office Act 1814 (54 Geo. 3. c. 113)) for vesting in His Majesty, His Heirs and Successors, for ever, Part of the Ground and Buildings now belonging to the Society of King's Inns, Dublin, for erecting thereon a Repository for Public Records in Ireland. (Repealed by Statute Law (Repeals) Act 2013 (c. 2))
Lunacy (Ireland) Act 1826 (repealed)	7 Geo. 4. c. 14	11 April 1826
An Act for the further Amendment of an Act of the First and Second Years of His present Majesty, (Note: Lunacy (Ireland) Act 1821 (1 & 2 Geo. 4. c. 33)) for the Establishment of Asylums for the Lunatic Poor in Ireland. (Repealed by Health Services Act (Northern Ireland) 1948 (c. 3 (N.I.)))
Recovery of Small Tithes Act 1826 (repealed)	7 Geo. 4. c. 15	11 April 1826
An Act to amend an Act passed in the Seventh and Eighth Year of the Reign of King William the Third, (Note: Recovery of Small Tithes Act 1695 (7 & 8 Will. 3. c. 6)) for the more easy Recovery of Small Tithes. (Repealed by Statute Law Revision (No. 2) Act 1888 (51 & 52 Vict. c. 57))
Chelsea and Kilmainham Hospitals Act 1826	7 Geo. 4. c. 16	11 April 1826
An Act to consolidate and amend several Acts relating to the Royal Hospitals for Soldiers at Chelsea and Kilmainham.
Administration of Justice, Durham Act 1826 (repealed)	7 Geo. 4. c. 17	11 April 1826
An Act for remedying Inconveniences in the Administration of Justice, arising from the present Vacancy of the See of Durham, and for preventing the like in future. (Repealed by Statute Law Revision Act 1861 (24 & 25 Vict. c. 101))
Prisons (England) Act 1826 (repealed)	7 Geo. 4. c. 18	11 April 1826
An Act to authorize the Disposal of unnecessary Prisons in England. (Repealed by Prison Act 1865 (28 & 29 Vict. c. 126))
Assault and Battery (Scotland) Act 1826 (repealed)	7 Geo. 4. c. 19	11 April 1826
An Act to repeal Two Acts of the Parliament of Scotland, (Note: Murders Act 1584 (c. 138 (S))) (Note: Murder Act 1594 (c. 29 (S))) relative to Assault and Battery pendente Lite. (Repealed by Statute Law Revision Act 1873 (36 & 37 Vict. c. 91))
Stamp Duties (Ireland) Act 1826 (repealed)	7 Geo. 4. c. 20	5 May 1826
An Act to continue an Act of the First and Second Years of His present Majesty, (Note: Stamp Duties in Law Proceedings (Ireland) Act 1821 (1 & 2 Geo. 4. c. 112)) for granting for the Term of Five Years additional Stamp Duties on certain Proceedings in the Courts of Law in Ireland. (Repealed by Statute Law Revision Act 1861 (24 & 25 Vict. c. 101))
Mandamus (Ireland) Act 1826 (repealed)	7 Geo. 4. c. 21	5 May 1826
An Act for the better regulating Proceedings on Writs of Mandamus, in Ireland. (Repealed by Northern Ireland Act 1962 (10 & 11 Eliz. 2. c. 30))
Assessed Taxes Act 1826 (repealed)	7 Geo. 4. c. 22	5 May 1826
An Act to enable Persons to continue their Compositions for Assessed Taxes for further Periods, and for allowing Persons who have not compounded to enter into Composition for a limited Term. (Repealed by Revenue Act 1869 (32 & 33 Vict. c. 14))
Excise Act 1826 (repealed)	7 Geo. 4. c. 23	5 May 1826
An Act to repeal the Duties and Drawbacks of Excise upon tawed Kid Skins, Sheep Skins and Lamb Skins. (Repealed by Statute Law Revision Act 1873 (36 & 37 Vict. c. 91))
Quartering of Soldiers Act 1826 (repealed)	7 Geo. 4. c. 24	5 May 1826
An Act for fixing, until the Twenty fifth Day of March One thousand eight hundred and twenty seven, the Rates of Subsistence to be paid to Innkeepers and others on quartering Soldiers. (Repealed by Statute Law Revision Act 1873 (36 & 37 Vict. c. 91))
Distillation (Scotland) Act 1826 (repealed)	7 Geo. 4. c. 25	5 May 1826
An Act to continue, until the Fifth Day of July One thousand eight hundred and twenty eight, an Act (Note: Illicit Distillation (Scotland) Act 1822 (3 Geo. 4. c. 52)) for preventing private Distillation in Scotland. (Repealed by Statute Law Revision Act 1873 (36 & 37 Vict. c. 91))
Duties on Personal Estates Act 1826 (repealed)	7 Geo. 4. c. 26	5 May 1826
An Act for continuing to His Majesty for One Year certain Duties on Personal Estates, Offices and Pensions in England, for the Service of the Year One thousand eight hundred and twenty six. (Repealed by Statute Law Revision Act 1873 (36 & 37 Vict. c. 91))
Militia Pay Act 1826 (repealed)	7 Geo. 4. c. 27	5 May 1826
An Act to defray the Charge of the Pay, Clothing and contingent and other Expences of the Disembodied Militia in Great Britain and Ireland; and to grant Allowances in certain Cases to Subaltern Officers, Adjutants, Quarter Masters, Surgeons, Assistant Surgeons, Surgeons Mates and Serjeant Majors of Militia, until the Twenty fifth Day of March One thousand eight hundred and twenty seven. (Repealed by Statute Law Revision Act 1873 (36 & 37 Vict. c. 91))
Lands of Tilson (Receiver-General) Act 1826 (repealed)	7 Geo. 4. c. 28	5 May 1826
An Act for exonerating certain Estates called Corsica Halt, Alfriston, Maff Alfriston otherwise Maffe Alfriston and Dean Place, in the County of Sussex, belonging to John Henry Tilson Esquire, from the Claims of the Crown. (Repealed by Statute Law Revision Act 1950 (14 Geo. 6. c. 6))
Assignment and Sub-letting of Land (Ireland) Act 1826 or the Assignment and Sub-Letting of Land Act 1826 (repealed)	7 Geo. 4. c. 29	5 May 1826
An Act to amend the Law of Ireland respecting the Assignment and Subletting of Lands and Tenements. (Repealed by Landlord and Tenant Law Amendment (Ireland) Act 1860 (23 & 24 Vict. c. 154))
Public Works Loans Act 1826 (repealed)	7 Geo. 4. c. 30	5 May 1826
An Act to amend the several Acts for authorizing Advances for carrying on Public Works, and to extend the Provisions thereof in certain Cases. (Repealed by Statute Law Revision Act 1873 (36 & 37 Vict. c. 91))
Army Act 1826 (repealed)	7 Geo. 4. c. 31	5 May 1826
An Act to amend an Act passed in the Fifty second Year of the Reign of His late Majesty King George the Third, (Note: Retirement of Officers on Half Pay Act 1812 (52 Geo. 3. c. 151)) so far as the same relates to the Retired Allowances of Quarter Masters of Cavalry and Infantry. (Repealed by Army Pensions Act 1830 (11 Geo. 4 & 1 Will. 4. c. 41))
Board of Trade (President) Act 1826 (repealed)	7 Geo. 4. c. 32	5 May 1826
An Act to amend an Act (Note: Civil List and Secret Service Money Act 1782 (22 Geo. 3. c. 82)) for suppressing or regulating certain Offices therein mentioned, so far as relates to the Board of Trade. (Repealed by Board of Trade Act 1909 (9 Edw. 7. c. 23))
Licensing of Stage Coaches Act 1826 (repealed)	7 Geo. 4. c. 33	5 May 1826
An Act to make further Regulations relating to the Licensing of Stage Coaches. (Repealed by Stage Carriages Act 1832 (2 & 3 Will. 4. c. 120))
British and Irish Fisheries Act 1826 (repealed)	7 Geo. 4. c. 34	5 May 1826
An Act to amend an Act of the Fifth Year of His present Majesty, (Note: Fisheries Act 1824 (5 Geo. 4. c. 64)) for amending the several Acts for the Encouragement and Improvement of the British and Irish Fisheries. (Repealed for Ireland by Fisheries (Ireland) Act 1842 (5 & 6 Vict. c. 106) and for England and Wales and Scotland by Sea Fisheries Act 1868 (31 & 32 Vict. c. 45))
Greenwich Hospital Act 1826 (repealed)	7 Geo. 4. c. 35	5 May 1826
An Act to enable incapacitated Persons to convey to the Commissioners and Governors of the Royal Hospital for Seamen at Greenwich, in the County of Kent, certain Premises situate in the Parish of Greenwich in the said County, and for other Purposes relating thereto. (Repealed by Greenwich Hospital Outpensions, etc. Act 1829 (10 Geo. 4. c. 26))
Civil Bill Courts (Ireland) Act 1826 (repealed)	7 Geo. 4. c. 36	5 May 1826
An Act to regulate the Service of the Process of the several Courts for the Recovery of Small Debts by Civil Bill in Ireland. (Repealed by Civil Bill Courts (Ireland) Act 1851 (14 & 15 Vict. c. 57))
Juries (East Indies) Act 1826 (repealed)	7 Geo. 4. c. 37	5 May 1826
An Act to regulate the Appointment of Juries in the East Indies. (Repealed by Statute Law Revision Act 1873 (36 & 37 Vict. c. 91))
Admiralty Offences Act 1826 (repealed)	7 Geo. 4. c. 38	5 May 1826
An Act to enable Commissioners for trying Offences upon the Sea, and Justices of the Peace, to take Examinations touching such Offences, and to commit to safe Custody Persons charged therewith. (Repealed for England and Wales and Northern Ireland by Criminal Law Act 1967 (c. 58) and for Scotland by Statute Law (Repeals) Act 1974 (c. 22))
National Debt Act 1826 (repealed)	7 Geo. 4. c. 39	5 May 1826
An Act for funding Eight Millions of Exchequer Bills. (Repealed by Statute Law Revision Act 1870 (33 & 34 Vict. c. 69))
Advances for Rebuilding London Bridge Act 1826 (repealed)	7 Geo. 4. c. 40	5 May 1826
An Act to authorize the Lords Commissioners of His Majesty's Treasury to advance Money out of the Consolidated Fund towards the Expences of rebuilding London Bridge. (Repealed by Statute Law Revision Act 1873 (36 & 37 Vict. c. 91))
Manor Courts (Ireland) Act 1826 (repealed)	7 Geo. 4. c. 41	26 May 1826
An Act to amend the Laws for the Recovery of Small Debts, and the Proceedings for that Purpose, in the Manor Courts in Ireland. (Repealed by Statute Law Revision Act 1873 (36 & 37 Vict. c. 91))
Impounding of Cattle (Ireland) Act 1826 (repealed)	7 Geo. 4. c. 42	26 May 1826
An Act to amend the Laws in force in Ireland for preventing the vexatious Impounding of Cattle for Trespass or Damage feasant. (Repealed by Summary Jurisdiction (Ireland) Act 1851 (14 & 15 Vict. c. 92))
Transfer of Trust Estates, etc. (Ireland) Act 1826 or the Transfer of Trust Estates Act 1826 (repealed)	7 Geo. 4. c. 43	26 May 1826
An Act to amend the Laws in force in Ireland relating to Conveyances and Transfers of Estates and Funds vested in Trustees. (Repealed by Transfer of Trust Estates Act 1830 (11 Geo. 4 & 1 Will. 4. c. 60))
Stamps Act 1826 (repealed)	7 Geo. 4. c. 44	26 May 1826
An Act to allow, until the Tenth Day of October One thousand eight hundred and twenty six, the Enrolment of certain Articles of Clerkship; to prevent Attornies and others from being prejudiced in certain Cases by the Neglect to take out their Annual Certificates; to prohibit the stamping Articles of Clerkship after a certain Time; and to extend the Period for taking out Certificates after Matriculation at the Universities. (Repealed by Inland Revenue Repeal Act 1870 (33 & 34 Vict. c. 99))
Entailed Estates Act 1826 (repealed)	7 Geo. 4. c. 45	26 May 1826
An Act for repealing an Act passed in the Thirty ninth and Fortieth Years of the Reign of His late Majesty King George the Third, intituled "An Act for Relief of Persons entitled to Entailed Estates to be purchased with Trust Monies," (Note: Entailed Estates Act 1800 (39 & 40 Geo. 3. c. 56)) and for making further Provisions in lieu thereof. (Repealed for England and Wales by Fines and Recoveries Act 1833 (3 & 4 Will. 4. c. 74) and for Ireland by Fines and Recoveries (Ireland) Act 1834 (4 & 5 Will. 4. c. 92))
Country Bankers Act 1826 (repealed)	7 Geo. 4. c. 46	26 May 1826
An Act for the better regulating Copartnerships of certain Bankers in England; and for amending so much of an Act of the Thirty ninth and Fortieth Years of the Reign of His late Majesty King George the Third, intituled "An Act for establishing an Agreement with the Governor and Company of the Bank of England, for advancing the Sum of Three Millions towards the Supply for the Service of the Year One thousand eight hundred," (Note: Bank of England Act 1800 (39 & 40 Geo. 3. c. 28)) as relates to the same. (Repealed by Statute Law Revision Act 1958 (6 & 7 Eliz. 2. c. 46))
Exportation of Salmon, etc., from Ireland Act 1826 (repealed)	7 Geo. 4. c. 47	26 May 1826
An Act to allow, until the Fifth Day of April One thousand eight hundred and thirty, certain Bounties on the Exportation from Ireland of Salmon, Red Herrings and Dried Sprats. (Repealed by Statute Law Revision Act 1873 (36 & 37 Vict. c. 91))
Customs Act 1826 (repealed)	7 Geo. 4. c. 48	26 May 1826
An Act to alter and amend the several Laws relating to the Customs. (Repealed by Statute Law Revision Act 1873 (36 & 37 Vict. c. 91))
Excise (Ireland) Act 1826 (repealed)	7 Geo. 4. c. 49	26 May 1826
An Act to amend several Laws of Excise relating to Bonds on Excise Licences in Ireland, Tiles and Bricks for draining, Oaths on Exportation of Goods, Permits for the Removal of Tea in Ireland, Size of Casks in which Spirits may be warehoused in Scotland and Ireland, the Allowance of Duty on Starch and Soap used in certain Manufactures, and the Repayment of Money advanced by Collectors of Excise for Public Works in Ireland. (Repealed by Statute Law Revision Act 1873 (36 & 37 Vict. c. 91))
Exchequer Bills (No. 2) Act 1826 (repealed)	7 Geo. 4. c. 50	26 May 1826
An Act for raising the Sum of Thirteen millions two hundred thousand Pounds by Exchequer Bills, for the Service of the Year One thousand eight hundred and twenty six. (Repealed by Statute Law Revision Act 1873 (36 & 37 Vict. c. 91))
Sale of Crown Lands Act 1826 (repealed)	7 Geo. 4. c. 51	26 May 1826
An Act to confirm Sales made by the Surveyor General and the Commissioners of the Land Revenue of the Crown, under an Act of the Forty eighth Year of His late Majesty. (Note: Duchy of Lancaster Act 1808 (48 Geo. 3. c. 73)) (Repealed by Statute Law Revision Act 1873 (36 & 37 Vict. c. 91))
Naval Forces in India Act 1826 (repealed)	7 Geo. 4. c. 52	26 May 1826
An Act for defraying the Expence of any additional Naval Force to be employed in the East Indies. (Repealed by Statute Law Revision (No. 2) Act 1888 (51 & 52 Vict. c. 57))
Importation of Silk Act 1826 (repealed)	7 Geo. 4. c. 53	26 May 1826
An Act to regulate the Importation of Silk Goods until the Tenth Day of October One thousand eight hundred and twenty eight, and to encourage the Silk Manufactures by the Repeal of certain Duties. (Repealed by Statute Law Revision Act 1873 (36 & 37 Vict. c. 91))
Aliens Act 1826 or the Registration of Aliens Act 1826 or the Aliens Registration Act 1826 or the Alien Registration Act 1826 or the Peace Alien Act 1826 (repealed)	7 Geo. 4. c. 54	26 May 1826
An Act for the Registration of Aliens. (Repealed by Registration of Aliens Act 1836 (6 & 7 Will. 4. c. 11))
Poll at Elections, Yorkshire Act 1826 (repealed)	7 Geo. 4. c. 55	26 May 1826
An Act to regulate the Manner of taking the Poll at Elections of Knights of the Shire to serve in Parliament for the County of York. (Repealed by Statute Law Revision Act 1861 (24 & 25 Vict. c. 101))
East India Officers' Act 1826 or the East Indian Officers Act 1826 (repealed)	7 Geo. 4. c. 56	26 May 1826
An Act to suspend the Provisions of an Act of His late Majesty, (Note: East India Company Act 1813 (53 Geo. 3. c. 155)) respecting the Appointment of Writers in the Service of the East India Company, and to authorize the Payment of the Allowances of the Civil and Military Officers of the said Company dying while absent from India. (Repealed by Government of India Act 1915 (5 & 6 Geo. 5. c. 61))
Insolvent Debtors (England) Act 1826 (repealed)	7 Geo. 4. c. 57	26 May 1826
An Act to amend and consolidate the Laws Tor the Relief of Insolvent Debtors in England. (Repealed by Statute Law Revision Act 1873 (36 & 37 Vict. c. 91))
Yeomanry Act 1826 (repealed)	7 Geo. 4. c. 58	26 May 1826
An Act to amend the Laws relating to Corps of Yeomanry Cavalry and Volunteers in Great Britain. (Repealed by Territorial Army and Militia Act 1921 (11 & 12 Geo. 5. c. 37))
Merchant Seamen Act 1826 (repealed)	7 Geo. 4. c. 59	26 May 1826
An Act to continue for Seven Years, and from thence to the End of the then next Session of Parliament, an Act of the Fifty ninth Year of His late Majesty, (Note: Wages of Merchant Seamen Act 1819 (59 Geo. 3. c. 58)) for facilitating the Recovery of the Wages of Seamen in the Merchant Service. (Repealed by Statute Law Revision Act 1873 (36 & 37 Vict. c. 91))
Destruction of Dwelling Houses (Ireland) Act 1826 (repealed)	7 Geo. 4. c. 60	26 May 1826
An Act to prevent the wilful and malicious Destruction of Dwelling Houses in Ireland. (Repealed by Criminal Statutes (Ireland) Repeal Act 1828 (9 Geo. 4. c. 53))
Justices (Ireland) Act 1826 (repealed)	7 Geo. 4. c. 61	26 May 1826
An Act for the more effectual Administration of Justice in Cities, Towns Corporate and other local Jurisdictions in Ireland. (Repealed by Magistrates' Courts Act (Northern Ireland) 1964 (c. 21 (N.I.)))
Valuation of Lands (Ireland) Act 1826 (repealed)	7 Geo. 4. c. 62	26 May 1826
An Act to make Provision for the uniform Valuation of Lands and Tenements in the several Baronies, Parishes and other Divisions of Counties in Ireland for the Purpose of the more equally levying of the Rates and Charges upon such Baronies, Parishes and Divisions respectively. (Repealed by Valuation of Lands (Ireland) Act 1836 (6 & 7 Will. 4. c. 84))
County Buildings Act 1826 (repealed)	7 Geo. 4. c. 63	26 May 1826
An Act to provide for repairing, improving and rebuilding Shire Halls, County Halls and other Buildings for holding the Assizes and Grand Sessions, and also Judges' Lodgings throughout England and Wales. (Repealed by Courts Act 1971 (c. 23))
Criminal Law Act 1826	7 Geo. 4. c. 64	26 May 1826
An Act for improving the Administration of Criminal Justice in England.
Alehouses (England) Act 1826 (repealed)	7 Geo. 4. c. 65	26 May 1826
An Act to continue until the First Day of January One thousand eight hundred and twenty seven, and to the End of the next Session of Parliament, an Act of the Third Year of His present Majesty, (Note: Licensing of Ale Houses Act 1822 (3 Geo. 4. c. 77)) for regulating the Manner of licensing Alehouses in England. (Repealed by Statute Law Revision Act 1873 (36 & 37 Vict. c. 91))
Clergy Residence Act 1826 (repealed)	7 Geo. 4. c. 66	26 May 1826
An Act to render more effectual the several Acts now in force to promote the Residence of the Parochial Clergy, by making Provision for purchasing Houses and other necessary Buildings for the Use of their Benefices. (Repealed for Ireland by Church of Ireland Acts Repeal Act 1851 (14 & 15 Vict. c. 71) and for England and Wales and Scotland by Statute Law (Repeals) Act 1971 (c. 52))
Bankers (Scotland) Act 1826 (repealed)	7 Geo. 4. c. 67	26 May 1826
An Act to regulate the Mode in which certain Societies or Copartnerships for Banking in Scotland may sue and be sued. (Repealed by Statute Law Revision Act 1959 (7 & 8 Eliz. 2. c. 68))
Legislative Assembly, Upper Canada Act 1826 (repealed)	7 Geo. 4. c. 68	26 May 1826
An Act to amend so much of an Act of the Thirty first Year of His late Majesty, (Note: Clergy Endowments (Canada) Act 1791 (31 Geo. 3. c. 31)) as relates to the Election of Members to serve in the Legislative Assembly of the Province of Upper Canada. (Repealed by Statute Law Revision Act 1874 (37 & 38 Vict. c. 35))
Stealing from Gardens Act 1826 (repealed)	7 Geo. 4. c. 69	31 May 1826
An Act to amend the Law in respect to the Offence of stealing from Gardens and Hothouses. (Repealed for England and Wales by Criminal Statutes Repeal Act 1827 (7 & 8 Geo. 4. c. 27), for Ireland by Criminal Statutes (Ireland) Repeal Act 1828 (9 Geo. 4. c. 53) and for India by Criminal Law (India) Act 1828 (9 Geo. 4. c. 74))
Corn Act 1826 (repealed)	7 Geo. 4. c. 70	31 May 1826
An Act to permit Foreign Corn, Meal and Flour, warehoused, to be taken out for Home Consumption, until the Sixteenth Day of August One thousand eight hundred and twenty six. (Repealed by Statute Law Revision Act 1873 (36 & 37 Vict. c. 91))
Corn (No. 2) Act 1826 (repealed)	7 Geo. 4. c. 71	31 May 1826
An Act to empower His Majesty to admit Foreign Corn for Home Consumption, under certain Limitations, until the First Day of January One thousand eight hundred and twenty seven, or for Six Weeks after the Commencement of the then next ensuing Session of Parliament, if Parliament shall not then be sitting. (Repealed by Statute Law Revision Act 1873 (36 & 37 Vict. c. 91))
Church Rates (Ireland) Act 1826	7 Geo. 4. c. 72	31 May 1826
An Act to consolidate and amend the Laws which regulate the Levy and Application of Church Rates and Parish Cesses, and the Election of Churchwardens, and the Maintenance of Parish Clerks, in Ireland.
Benefices (Ireland) Act 1826	7 Geo. 4. c. 73	31 May 1826
An Act to consolidate the Laws in force in Ireland for the Disappropriation of Benefices annexed to Dignities, and for the Appropriation of others in their Stead, and for uniting Benefices with Dignities, and to make further Provisions for the like Purposes.
Prisons (Ireland) Act 1826 (repealed)	7 Geo. 4. c. 74	31 May 1826
An Act for consolidating and amending the Laws relating to Prisons in Ireland. (Repealed by Prison Act (Northern Ireland) 1953 (c. 18 (N.I.)))
Memorials of Grants of Annuities Act 1826 (repealed)	7 Geo. 4. c. 75	31 May 1826
An Act to explain an Act of the Fifty third Year of the Reign of His late Majesty, (Note: Inrolment of Grants of Annuities Act 1813 (53 Geo. 3. c. 141)) respecting the Enrolment of Memorials of Grants of Annuities. (Repealed by Usury Laws Repeal Act 1854 (17 & 18 Vict. c. 90))
Holyhead Road Act 1826 or the Holyhead Bridges and Roads Act 1826 (repealed)	7 Geo. 4. c. 76	31 May 1826
An Act for further extending the Powers of an Act (Note: Holyhead Road Act 1823 (4 Geo. 4. c. 74)) for vesting in Commissioners the Bridges building over the Menai Straits and the River Conway and the Harbours of Howth and Holyhead, and the Road from Dublin to Howth, and for the further Improvement of the Road from London to Holyhead. (Repealed by London and Holyhead and Liverpool Roads Act 1827 (7 & 8 Geo. 4. c. 35), Holyhead Road Relief Act 1861 (24 & 25 Vict. c. 28) and Statute Law (Repeals) Act 2013 (c. 2))
Regent Street, Carlton Place Act 1826	7 Geo. 4. c. 77	31 May 1826
An Act to extend to Charing Cross, the Strand and Places adjacent, the Powers of an Act (Note: New Street Act 1813 (53 Geo. 3. c. 121)) for making a more convenient Communication from Mary le bone Park; and to enable the Commissioners of His Majesty's Woods, Forests and Land Revenues to grant Leases of the Site of Carlton Palace.
Houses of Parliament Act 1826	7 Geo. 4. c. 78	31 May 1826
An Act to vest in the Commissioners of His Majesty's Woods, Forests and Land Revenues, the Powers of several Acts for the Improvement of the Streets near Westminster Hall and the Houses of Parliament; and to authorize the Conversion of the Pavements in several Parts of the Metropolis into broken Stone Roads.
Appropriation Act 1826 (repealed)	7 Geo. 4. c. 79	31 May 1826
An Act for applying a Sum out of the Consolidated Fund, and the Surplus or the Grants of the Year One thousand eight hundred and twenty five, to the Service of the Year One thousand eight hundred and twenty six; and for further appropriating the Supplies granted in this Session of Parliament. (Repealed by Statute Law Revision Act 1873 (36 & 37 Vict. c. 91))

=== Local acts ===
Short title	Citation	Royal assent
Long title
Loes and Wilford Poor Relief Act 1826 (repealed)	7 Geo. 4. c. i	22 March 1826
An Act to repeal Two Acts relating to the Employment of the Poor within the Hundreds of Loes and Wilford, in the County of Suffolk, and to disincorporate the said Hundreds. (Repealed by Statute Law (Repeals) Act 2013 (c. 2))
Witham Navigation Act 1826	7 Geo. 4. c. ii	22 March 1826
An Act for enabling the Company of Proprietors of the Witham Navigation to complete the Drainage and Navigation by the River Witham; and to raise a further Sum of Money for that Purpose.
Brighthelmston Chapels of Ease Act 1826	7 Geo. 4. c. iii	22 March 1826
An Act for the Appropriation of Two Chapels as Chapels of Ease to the Parish Church of Brighthelmston, (Note: Brighthelmston is now known as Brighton.) in the County of Sussex.
Stratford-upon-Avon Bridge Act 1826 (repealed)	7 Geo. 4. c. iv	22 March 1826
An Act for maintaining and repairing the Bridge over the River Avon, at or near Stratford upon Avon, in the County of Warwick, and for widening and improving the Approaches thereto. (Repealed by Statute Law (Repeals) Act 1995 (c. 44))
Dover Markets Act 1826 (repealed)	7 Geo. 4. c. v	22 March 1826
An Act for enlarging the present Market, and establishing Fish Markets, in the Town and Port of Dover in the County of Kent; and for removing the Elections of Members and of Mayors of the said Town from the Church of Saint Mary the Virgin in Dover. (Repealed by County of Kent Act 1981 (c. xviii))
Newport (Monmouthshire) Improvement Act 1826 (repealed)	7 Geo. 4. c. vi	22 March 1826
An Act for lighting, watching, paving, cleansing and improving the Streets, Highways and Places within the Town and Borough of Newport, in the County of Monmouth. (Repealed by Newport and South Monmouthshire Water Board Order 1960 (SI 1960/161))
Bridgwater Improvement Act 1826	7 Geo. 4. c. vii	22 March 1826
An Act for enlarging the Market House and regulating the Markets within the Borough of Bridgwater, in the County of Somerset; for paving, cleansing, lighting and watching the Streets, Lanes and other public Passages and Places within the said Borough or adjacent thereto, and for the Improvement thereof.
Macclesfield, Sutton, and Hurdsfield Gas (Cheshire) Act 1826 (repealed)	7 Geo. 4. c. viii	22 March 1826
An Act for lighting with Gas the several Townships of Macclesfield, Sutton and Hurdsfield, all in the Parish of Prestbury, in the County Palatine of Chester. (Repealed by Cheshire County Council Act 1980 (c. xiii))
Cannock and Penkridge Turnpike (Staffordshire) Act 1826	7 Geo. 4. c. ix	22 March 1826
An Act for making and maintaining a Turnpike Road from Cannock in the County of Stafford to Penkridge in the same County.
Worthing and Lancing Turnpike Road and Sea Defences Act 1826	7 Geo. 4. c. x	22 March 1826
An Act for making and maintaining a Turnpike Road from Worthing to Lancing in the County of Sussex, and Groynes, Embankments and other Sea Defences, for protecting such Road and the Lands adjoining from the future Encroachments of the Sea.
Road from Collingham to York Act 1826	7 Geo. 4. c. xi	22 March 1826
An Act for improving the Road from Collingham in the West Riding of the County of York, to the City of York; and for making certain Diversions from such Road.
Marshfield District of Roads Act 1826 (repealed)	7 Geo. 4. c. xii	22 March 1826
An Act for more effectually repairing and maintaining the Road from Chippenham Bridge in the County of Wilts to the Top of Togg Hill in the County of Gloucester, and several other Roads therein mentioned, in the said Counties and in the County of Somerset, called The Marshfield District. (Repealed by Statute Law (Repeals) Act 2013 (c. 2))
Godalming and Pains Hill Road Act 1826 (repealed)	7 Geo. 4. c. xiii	22 March 1826
An Act for making and maintaining a Road from Godalming, through Hascomb, to Pains Hill in the County of Surrey. (Repealed by Statute Law (Repeals) Act 2013 (c. 2))
Road from Knaresborough to Ripon and Pateley Bridge Act 1826 (repealed)	7 Geo. 4. c. xiv	22 March 1826
An Act for improving the Turnpike Road from Knaresbrough to the Junction of the Road from Ripon to Pateley Bridge, in the West Riding of the County of York. (Repealed by Knaresborough and Pateley Bridge Turnpike Road Act 1856 (19 & 20 Vict. c. l))
Pengate and Tinhead Road (Wiltshire) Act 1826	7 Geo. 4. c. xv	22 March 1826
An Act for maintaining and improving the Road leading from Pengate in the Parish of Westbury to a Place formerly called Price's Warren Gate, at Tinhead in the Parish of Edinton in the County of Wilts, and other Roads near or adjoining the said Roads, in the Counties of Wilts and Somerset.
Manchester and Salters Brook Roads Act 1826	7 Geo. 4. c. xvi	22 March 1826
An Act for more effectually repairing and improving the Roads from Manchester in the County Palatine of Lancaster, to Salters Brook in the County Palatine of Chester; and for making and maintaining several Extensions or Diversions of Road, and a new Branch of Road to communicate therewith.
South Shields and Vigo Lane Turnpike Road Act 1826 (repealed)	7 Geo. 4. c. xvii	22 March 1826
An Act for making and maintaining a Turnpike Road from South Shields to White Mere Pool, and from thence to join the Durham and Newcastle Turnpike Road at Vigo Lane, with a Branch from Jarrow Slake to East Boldon, all in the County of Durham. (Repealed by South Shields Turnpike Roads Act 1854 (17 & 18 Vict. c. xlvii))
Road through Holt and Melksham (Wiltshire) Act 1826 (repealed)	7 Geo. 4. c. xviii	22 March 1826
An Act for amending and maintaining the Road leading from the Turnpike Road on Farrard's Common in the Parish of Bradford, through Holt and Melksham, to Homan's Stile in the Parish of Lacock in the County of Wilts, and the Road leading therefrom to the Bath Turnpike Road upon Kingsdown Hill in the same County. (Repealed by Annual Turnpike Acts Continuance Act 1872 (35 & 36 Vict. c. 85))
Little Neston and Hoose, and Upton and Birkenhead Roads (Cheshire) Act 1826	7 Geo. 4. c. xix	22 March 1826
An Act for making and maintaining a Turnpike Road, commencing at or near a certain House called The Shrewsbury Arms, situate at Hinderton in the Township of Little Neston, by way of Upton, and terminating in the Township of Hoose, and from Upton aforesaid to the Township of Birkenhead, and also certain Branches of Road to communicate therewith, all in the County Palatine of Chester.
Macclesfield Roads Act 1826	7 Geo. 4. c. xx	22 March 1826
An Act tor amending an Act of His present Majesty, (Note: Sandon Roads (Cheshire and Staffordshire) Act 1824 (5 Geo. 4. c. xxiv)) for repairing the Road from Sandon in the County of Stafford to Bullock Smithy in the County of Chester, and from Hilderstone to Draycot in the Moors, and from Wetley Rocks to Tean, in the County of Stafford, so far as relates to the Macclesfield District of Road; and for making a Diversion of Road in the said District.
Ridgehill and Lanes and Holehouse Road (Lancashire, Yorkshire) Act 1826 (repealed)	7 Geo. 4. c. xxi	22 March 1826
An Act for making and maintaining a Road from Ridghill and Lanes, in the Parish of Ashton under Lyne in the County Palatine of Lancaster, to or near to Holehouse in Saddleworth in the West Riding of the County of York. (Repealed by Ridghill and Lanes and Holehouse Turnpike Road Act 1854 (17 & 18 Vict. c. xxxvi))
Birmingham and Watford Gap Road Act 1826	7 Geo. 4. c. xxii	22 March 1826
An Act for repairing the Road from Birmingham to Watford Gap, in the Parish of Sutton Coldfield in the County of Warwick, and other Roads communicating therewith.
Arrow and Pot Hooks End, and Dunnington and Crabs Cross Roads (Warwickshire and Worcestershire) Act 1826	7 Geo. 4. c. xxiii	22 March 1826
An Act for making and maintaining a Turnpike Road from Arrow in the County of Warwick to Pot Hooks End in the County of Worcester, and from Dunnington in the said County of Warwick to Crabs Cross in the said County of Worcester.
Roads from Littlegate, Newark-upon-Trent and Southwell Act 1826	7 Geo. 4. c. xxiv	22 March 1826
An Act for more effectually repairing the Roads from Littlegate, at the Top of Leadenham Hill, in the County of Lincoln, to Newark upon Trent, and from Newark upon Trent to Mansfield, and from Southwell to the South End of the Town of Oxton, in the County of Nottingham.
Roads to and from Exeter Act 1826 (repealed)	7 Geo. 4. c. xxv	22 March 1826
An Act for repairing, widening and improving the several Roads leading to and from the City of Exeter, and for making certain new Lines of Road to communicate with the same; and for keeping in repair Exe Bridge and Countess Wear Bridge. (Repealed by Exeter Turnpike Roads Act 1852 (15 & 16 Vict. c. cliv))
Limerick and Cork Road within Cork County Act 1826	7 Geo. 4. c. xxvi	22 March 1826
An Act for more effectually repairing the Road leading from the Bounds of the Counties of Limerick and Cork, between the Towns of Kilmallock and Charleville, to the City of Cork.
Norwich and Scole Bridge Road Act 1826 (repealed)	7 Geo. 4. c. xxvii	22 March 1826
An Act for more effectually repairing, widening and improving the Road from the City of Norwich to Scole Bridge, in the County of Norfolk. (Repealed by Statute Law (Repeals) Act 2008 (c. 12))
Pyecombe and Hickstead Roads Act 1826 (repealed)	7 Geo. 4. c. xxviii	22 March 1826
An Act for more effectually repairing and improving the Road from the Brighthelmston Road at Pyecombe to Warninglid Cross in the Parish of Cuckfield, and from Pyecombe to the Henfield Road at Poynings Common, in the County of Sussex, and for making a new Road from Warninglid Cross to Hand Cross in the said County. (Repealed by Pyecombe and Hickstead Turnpike Roads Act 1851 (14 & 15 Vict. c. i))
Wimpole and Potton Road (Cambridgeshire, Bedfordshire) Act 1826 (repealed)	7 Geo. 4. c. xxix	22 March 1826
An Act for making and maintaining a Turnpike Road from Wimpole in the County of Cambridge to Wrestlingworth in the County of Bedford, and from Wrestlingworth to Potton, both in the said County of Bedford. (Repealed by Statute Law (Repeals) Act 2008 (c. 12))
Macclesfield Canal Act 1826	7 Geo. 4. c. xxx	11 April 1826
An Act for making and maintaining a navigable Canal from the Peak Forest Canal, in the Township of Marple, in the County Palatine of Chester, to join the Canal Navigation from the Trent to the Mersey, at or near Harding's Wood Lock, in the Township or Hamlet of Talk, or Talk on the Hill, in the County of Stafford.
Margate Pier and Harbour Act 1826 (repealed)	7 Geo. 4. c. xxxi	11 April 1826
An Act to amend an Act (Note: Margate Pier and Harbour Company Act 1812 (52 Geo. 3. c. clxxxvi)) for separating the Management of the Harbour of Margate, in the County of Kent, from the Paving and Lighting of the Town of Margate, and for vesting the future Management of the said Harbour in a Joint Stock Company of Proprietors. (Repealed by Margate Pier and Harbour Revision Order 1992 (SI 1993/1313))
Ramsgate Theatre Act 1826	7 Geo. 4. c. xxxii	11 April 1826
An Act to enable His Majesty to license a Playhouse within the Town and Port of Ramsgate in the Isle of Thanett in the County of Kent.
Reading Water Act 1826 (repealed)	7 Geo. 4. c. xxxiii	11 April 1826
An Act for the better and more effectually supplying with Water the Inhabitants of the several Parishes of Saint Mary, Saint Lawrence and Saint Giles, Reading, in the County of Berks. (Repealed by Reading and Berkshire Water, &c. Act 1959 (7 & 8 Eliz. 2. c. xxxiii))
Metheringham and Dunston Drainage Act 1826	7 Geo. 4. c. xxxiv	11 April 1826
An Act for embanking, draining and otherwise improving Lands in the Parishes of Metheringham and Dunston, in the County of Lincoln.
Lambeth, Camberwell and Newington Improvement Act 1826 (repealed)	7 Geo. 4. c. xxxv	11 April 1826
An Act for lighting, watching, cleansing and otherwise improving the Camberwell New Road, the Lambeth Wyke Estate and other Places in the Vicinity thereof, in the Parishes of Lambeth, Camberwell and Newington, in the County of Surrey. (Repealed by London Government (Borough of Camberwell) Order in Council 1901 (SR&O 1901/213), London Government (Borough of Lambeth) Order in Council 1901 (SR&O 1901/219) and London Government (Borough of Southwark) Order in Council 1901 (SR&O 1901/275))
Burnley and Habergham Eaves Gas Act 1826 (repealed)	7 Geo. 4. c. xxxvi	11 April 1826
An Act for lighting with Gas the Town of Burnley cum Habergham Eaves, otherwise the Townships of Burnley and Habergham Eaves, within the Parish of Whalley, in the County Palatine of Lancaster. (Repealed by Burnley Improvement Act 1854 (17 & 18 Vict. c. lxvii))
Heywood Gas Act 1826 (repealed)	7 Geo. 4. c. xxxvii	11 April 1826
An Act for lighting with Gas the Village of Heywood, within the Parish of Bury, in the County Palatine of Lancaster. (Repealed by Heywood Gas Amendment Act 1856 (19 & 20 Vict. c. xiii))
Glasgow Gas Light Company Act 1826 (repealed)	7 Geo. 4. c. xxxviii	11 April 1826
An Act for enabling the Glasgow Gas Light Company to raise a further Sum of Money for the Use of their Works, and for other Purposes relating thereto. (Repealed by Glasgow Corporation Gas Act 1869 (32 & 33 Vict. c. lviii))
Roads through High Ham and Ashcott (Somerset) Act 1826 (repealed)	7 Geo. 4. c. xxxix	11 April 1826
An Act for more effectually repairing and improving the Roads leading from Pick's Hill, near the Town of Langport Eastover, in the County of Somerset, through High Ham, Ashcott and other Places, to Meare, in the said County. (Repealed by Langport Eastover, High Ham and Ashcott Turnpike Roads Act 1853 (16 & 17 Vict. c. lv))
Rotherham and Barnby Moor Road Act 1826 (repealed)	7 Geo. 4. c. xl	11 April 1826
An Act for making and maintaining a Turnpike Road from the Great North Road, at Barnby Moor in the County of Nottingham, to the Turnpike Road leading from Bawtry to Tinsley in the County of York, and from the said Bawtry and Tinsley Turnpike Road, at the North East End of Blackhill Lane, to the Town of Rotherham, in the said County of York. (Repealed by Rotherham and Barnby Moor Road (Yorkshire, Nottinghamshire) Act 1856 (19 & 20 Vict. c. lv))
East India Company and Creditors of the Nabobs of the Carnatic Act 1826 (repealed)	7 Geo. 4. c. xli	5 May 1826
An Act for further continuing, until the First Day of August One thousand eight hundred and twenty nine, and from thence to the End of the then next Session of Parliament, the Powers granted by an Act of the Forty sixth Year of His late Majesty, (Note: East India Company and the Nabobs of the Carnatic Act 1806 (46 Geo. 3. c. cxxxiii)) for enabling the Commissioners acting in execution of an Agreement made between the East India Company and the private Creditors of the Nabobs of the Carnatic, the better to carry the same into effect. (Repealed by Statute Law (Repeals) Act 2008 (c. 12))
Westminster Bridewell Act 1826 (repealed)	7 Geo. 4. c. xlii	5 May 1826
An Act for building a new Bridewell or House of Correction for the City and Liberty of Westminster. (Repealed by Statute Law (Repeals) Act 2008 (c. 12))
Invergordon Harbour Act 1826	7 Geo. 4. c. xliii	5 May 1826
An Act for erecting and maintaining a Harbour, and Works connected therewith, in the Frith of Cromarty, at or near the Village of Invergordon, in the County of Ross.
Alford Canal Act 1826	7 Geo. 4. c. xliv	5 May 1826
An Act for making and constructing a Canal from the Town of Alford in the County of Lincoln, to the Sea, at or near the Village of Anderby in the same County, with a Basin, Harbour and Piers.
Edinburgh and Glasgow Union Canal Act 1826	7 Geo. 4. c. xlv	5 May 1826
An Act to alter and amend the Edinburgh and Glasgow Union Canal Acts, and to enable the Company to borrow a further Sum of Money.
Heckbridge and Wentbridge Railway Act 1826	7 Geo. 4. c. xlvi	5 May 1826
An Act for making and maintaining a Railway or Tramroad from Heck Bridge in the Parish of Snaith, to Wentbridge in the Parish of Kirksmeaton, all in the West Riding of the County of York.
Forest of Dean Railway Act 1826	7 Geo. 4. c. xlvii	5 May 1826
An Act for maintaining an existing public Railway from the Summit of the Hill above Churchway Engine, in the Forest of Dean, to Cinderford Bridge, and for making public a private Railway from thence to the River Severn, at or near Bullo Pill all in the County of Gloucester; and for amending an Act (Note: Bullo Pill Railway Act 1809 (49 Geo. 3. c. clviii)) of His late Majesty relating to the said Railways.
Ballochney Railway Act 1826	7 Geo. 4. c. xlviii	5 May 1826
An Act for making a Railway from Arbuckle and Ballochney, in the Parish of New Monkland, in the County of Lanark, to or near the Termination of the Monkland and Kirkintilloch Railway, at Kipps or Kippbyres, also in the said Parish of New Monkland and County of Lanark.
Liverpool and Manchester Railway Act 1826 (repealed)	7 Geo. 4. c. xlix	5 May 1826
An Act for making and maintaining a Railway or Tramroad from the Town of Liverpool to the Town of Manchester, with certain Branches therefrom, all in the County of Lancaster. (Repealed by Grand Junction Railway Act 1845 (8 & 9 Vict. c. cxcviii))
Trinity Church in Ripon Act 1826	7 Geo. 4. c. l	5 May 1826
An Act for building a Church or Chapel of Ease in the Township of Ripon, in the West Riding of the County of York.
Church of St. David Liverpool Act 1826	7 Geo. 4. c. li	5 May 1826
An Act for erecting and endowing a Church in the Parish of Liverpool in the County Palatine of Lancaster, to be called the Church of Saint David.
Liverpool Cemetery Act 1826	7 Geo. 4. c. lii	5 May 1826
An Act for providing an additional Cemetery in the Parish of Liverpool in the County Palatine of Lancaster.
Firth of Forth Ferries Act 1826	7 Geo. 4. c. liii	5 May 1826
An Act for further improving the Communication between the Counties of Edinburgh and Fife by the Ferries cross the Frith of Forth between Leith and Newhaven, and Kinghorn, Burntisland and Dysart.
St. Giles Cripplegate Tithes Act 1826 (repealed)	7 Geo. 4. c. liv	5 May 1826
An Act for extinguishing Tithes and Customary Payments in lieu of Tithes and Easter Offerings within the Parish of Saint Giles Cripplegate, in the Liberties of the City of London; and for making Compensation to the Vicar for the Time being in lieu thereof. (Repealed by City of London (Various Powers) Act 1950 (14 Geo. 6. c. v))
London Corn Exchange Act 1826 (repealed)	7 Geo. 4. c. lv	5 May 1826
An Act for erecting and providing a New Corn Exchange at or near Mark Lane in the City of London. (Repealed by Corn Exchange Act 1929 (19 & 20 Geo. 5. c. xv))
Reading Improvement Act 1826 (repealed)	7 Geo. 4. c. lvi	5 May 1826
An Act for better paving, lighting, cleansing, watching and otherwise improving the Borough of Reading, in the County of Berks. (Repealed by Berkshire Act 1986 (c. ii))
Liverpool Improvement Act 1826 (repealed)	7 Geo. 4. c. lvii	5 May 1826
An Act for widening and improving certain Streets in the Town of Liverpool in the County Palatine of Lancaster; for the further Prevention of Nuisances and Annoyances in the said Town; for the Regulation of Weighing Machines, Weights and Measures, and the Establishment of a Fire Police therein. (Repealed by Liverpool Corporation Act 1921 (11 & 12 Geo. 5. c. lxxiv))
St. George Hanover Square and St. Luke Chelsea Improvement Act 1826	7 Geo. 4. c. lviii	5 May 1826
An Act for paving, lighting, watching, repairing and otherwise improving Grosvenor Place, and several Streets, Squares, Lanes and other Public Places now existing, and which shall hereafter be formed, upon certain Grounds in the several Parishes of Saint George Hanover Square, and Saint Luke Chelsea, in the County of Middlesex.
Holt Fleet Bridge over River Severn Act 1826	7 Geo. 4. c. lix	5 May 1826
An Act for building a Bridge over the River Severn, at or near Holt Fleets in the Parishes of Holt and Ombersley, in the County of Worcester; and for making Approaches to such Bridge.
Belvidere Roads Bridge, Lambeth Act 1826	7 Geo. 4. c. lx	5 May 1826
An Act to authorise the building a Bridge in Belvidere Road in the Parish of Saint Mary Lambeth, in the County of Surrey.
Tewkesbury Severn Bridge and Roads Act 1826	7 Geo. 4. c. lxi	5 May 1826
An Act for altering, amending and enlarging the Powers and Provisions of an Act (Note: Tewkesbury Severn Bridge and Roads Act 1823 (4 Geo. 4. c. ii)) relating to the Tewkesbury Severn Bridge and Roads.
Llanymynech Bridge over Virniew and Roads Act 1826	7 Geo. 4. c. lxii	5 May 1826
An Act for building a Bridge over the River Virniew, near Llanymynech, and making Roads, Embankments and Approaches thereto, in the several Counties of Montgomery, Salop and Denbigh, on the Road leading from Liverpool to Carmarthen, and for several other Purposes relating thereto.
All Saints Wandsworth Rates Act 1826 (repealed)	7 Geo. 4. c. lxiii	5 May 1826
An Act for the better ascertaining and collecting the Poor and other Rates in the Parish of All Saints Wandsworth, in the County of Surrey. (Repealed by London Government (Borough of Wandsworth) Order in Council 1901 (SR&O 1901/222))
Portsea Improvement Act 1826 (repealed)	7 Geo. 4. c. lxiv	5 May 1826
An Act for better lighting and watching the Town of Portsea, in the County of Southampton; and for amending an Act passed in the Thirty second Year of His late Majesty, (Note: Portsea Improvement Act 1792 (32 Geo. 3. c. 103)) for paving, cleansing and regulating the Streets and Public Places within the said Town, and removing and preventing Nuisances and Annoyances therein. (Repealed by Portsea Improvement Act 1843 (6 & 7 Vict. c. xxxv))
London Street, Glasgow Amendment Act 1826	7 Geo. 4. c. lxv	5 May 1826
An Act to amend an Act (Note: London Street, Glasgow Act 1824 (5 Geo. 4. c. lxix)) for opening a Street from the Cross of Glasgow to Monteith Row.
Norwich Gas Act 1826 (repealed)	7 Geo. 4. c. lxvi	5 May 1826
An Act to alter, amend and enlarge the Powers of an Act of His present Majesty's Reign, (Note: Norwich Gas Act 1820 (1 Geo. 4. c. xi)) for lighting with Gas the City of Norwich and County of the same City. (Repealed by British Gaslight Company (Norwich) Act 1858 (21 & 22 Vict. c. lxxix))
Oldham Poor Relief Act 1826	7 Geo. 4. c. lxvii	5 May 1826
An Act for placing certain Lands belonging to the Township of Oldham, in the Parish of Prestwick cum Oldham, in the County of Lancaster, under the Management of Trustees; and for making Conveyances thereof, at annual Rents, for the Benefit of the Poor of the said Township.
School for the Indigent Blind Act 1826	7 Geo. 4. c. lxviii	5 May 1826
An Act for establishing and well governing the Institution called "The School for the Indigent Blind," and for incorporating the Subscribers thereto, and the better enabling them to carry on their charitable and useful Designs.
Kinross Highways Act 1826	7 Geo. 4. c. lxix	5 May 1826
An Act for regulating and converting the Statute Labour in the County of Kinross, and for more effectually making and repairing the Highways within the said County.
Maidenhead, Reading and Henley Road Act 1826	7 Geo. 4. c. lxx	5 May 1826
An Act for more effectually repairing and otherwise improving the Road leading from Maidenhead Bridge to the Thirty three Mile Stone towards Reading, and from the said Road at the East Entrance on Maidenhead Thicket to the Thirty Mile Stone towards Henley, in the County of Berks.
Richmond (Yorkshire) and Lancaster Road (Western District) Act 1826 (repealed)	7 Geo. 4. c. lxxi	5 May 1826
An Act for more effectually maintaining so much of the Road from Richmond in the County of York to Lancaster in the County of Lancaster, and from Gilling to the Turnpike Road on Gatherley Moor, as relates to the Western District of the said Road; and for altering and diverting certain Parts of the said Western District of the said Road. (Repealed by Richmond and Lancaster Western District Turnpike Road Act 1851 (14 & 15 Vict. c. xxxi))
Kirkby Steven and Greeta Bridge Roads Act 1826	7 Geo. 4. c. lxxii	5 May 1826
An Act for more effectually repairing the Roads from Kirkby Steven High Lane Head, through Sedbergh, to Greeta Bridge, and other Roads communicating therewith, in the several Counties of Westmoreland, Lancaster and York; and for diverting, extending and altering some of the said Roads.
Ruscombe, Reading and Beenham Road Act 1826	7 Geo. 4. c. lxxiii	5 May 1826
An Act for repairing the Road from the Thirty three Mile Stone in the Parish of Ruscombe in the County of Berks towards Reading, to a Place called The Seven Mile Stone in the Parish of Beenham in the same County, and a certain other Road communicating therewith.
Branch End, Allendale and Cows Hill Turnpike Road Act 1826 (repealed)	7 Geo. 4. c. lxxiv	5 May 1826
An Act for making and maintaining a Turnpike Road, leading out of the Alstone Turnpike Road at Branch End in the County of Northumberland, through Cotton, Allendale Town and Allenheads, to Cows Hill in the County of Durham, with several Branches therefrom. (Repealed by Allendale Turnpike Roads Act 1853 (16 & 17 Vict. c. liii))
Alnwick, Eglingham and Chatton Road Act 1826	7 Geo. 4. c. lxxv	5 May 1826
An Act for more effectually amending, widening, altering, improving and maintaining the Road from the Town of Alnwick in the County of Northumberland, by Eglingham and Chatton, to the Great North Turnpike Road near to Haggerston Toll Bar in the County of Durham.
Roads between Tyburn and Uxbridge Act 1826 (repealed)	7 Geo. 4. c. lxxvi	5 May 1826
An Act for more effectually repairing the Roads between Tyburn and Uxbridge, and the Road leading from Brent Bridge over Hanwell Heath to the Great Western Road, and also for making and maintaining a Turnpike Road from the Uxbridge Road at Shepherd's Bush Common to the said Great Western Road near Turnham Green, all in the County of Middlesex; and for lighting, watching and watering the said Roads. (Repealed by Metropolis Roads Act 1826 (7 Geo. 4. c. cxlii))
Henley Bridge and Bisham Road Act 1826	7 Geo. 4. c. lxxvii	5 May 1826
An Act for more effectually repairing so much of the Road from Henley Bridge (Note: Henley Bridge in Henley-on-Thames. 51°32′15″N 0°54′01″W) to Maidenhead Thicket as lies between the said Bridge and the Thirtieth Mile Stone from London, in the Parish of Bisham, in the County of Berks.
Tewkesbury Roads Act 1826 (repealed)	7 Geo. 4. c. lxxviii	5 May 1826
An Act for making, maintaining and repairing certain Roads leading into and from the Town of Tewkesbury, in the County of Gloucester, towards the Cities of Gloucester and Worcester, and the Towns of Cheltenham, Stow on the Wold, Evesham and Pershore, and certain other Roads therein mentioned in the Counties of Gloucester and Worcester. (Repealed by Statute Law (Repeals) Act 2013 (c. 2))
Ashbourne and Leek, and Rushton Common and Congleton Roads Act 1826	7 Geo. 4. c. lxxix	5 May 1826
An Act for more effectually repairing the Road from Ashborne in the County of Derby to Leek in the County of Stafford, and from Ryecroft Gate upon Rushton Common to Congleton in the County of Chester.
Farnham and Petersfield Turnpike Road Act 1826 (repealed)	7 Geo. 4. c. lxxx	5 May 1826
An Act for making and maintaining a Turnpike Road from a Place called Coxbridge, near Farnham in the County of Surrey, to Ramshill near Petersfield in the County of Southampton. (Repealed by Statute Law (Repeals) Act 2013 (c. 2))
Manchester and Bury Turnpike Road Act 1826 (repealed)	7 Geo. 4. c. lxxxi	5 May 1826
An Act for making and maintaining a Road from the Top of Hunt's Bank in the Town of Manchester in the County of Lancaster, to join the present Manchester and Bury Turnpike Road in Pilkington in the said County. (Repealed by Manchester and Bury New Turnpike Road Act 1853 (16 & 17 Vict. c. cii))
West Houghton and Heath Charnock Road (Lancashire) Act 1826	7 Geo. 4. c. lxxxii	5 May 1826
An Act for more effectually repairing and improving the Road from West Houghton to near Halliwell Fields in the Township of Heath Charnock in the County of Lancaster.
Swineshead and Fosdyke Turnpike Road (Lincolnshire) Act 1826	7 Geo. 4. c. lxxxiii	5 May 1826
An Act for making into a Turnpike Road a Road leading from the Cross Gate in the Parish of Swineshead, to the Southern Extremity of the Parish of Fosdyke in the County of Lincoln, and repairing and maintaining the same.
Liskeard Roads Act 1826 (repealed)	7 Geo. 4. c. lxxxiv	5 May 1826
An Act for more effectually making, repairing and improving certain Roads leading to and from Liskeard, and certain other Roads therein mentioned, in the Counties of Cornwall and Devon. (Repealed by Liskeard Turnpike Roads Act 1852 (15 & 16 Vict. c. cxxix))
Roads from Spalding High Bridge to Donington Act 1826	7 Geo. 4. c. lxxxv	5 May 1826
An Act for repairing the Roads from Spalding High Bridge to the Market Place in Donington, and from the Tenth Mile Stone in the Parish of Gosbertown to the Eighth Mile Stone in the Parish of Wigtoft, in the County of Lincoln.
Road from Flint to Lower King's Ferry Act 1826 (repealed)	7 Geo. 4. c. lxxxvi	5 May 1826
An Act for more effectually repairing the Road from Flint to the Lower King's Ferry, and for making and maintaining Two new Branches of Roads from the Lower King's Ferry aforesaid, to or near to the Town of Mold, all in the County of Flint. (Repealed by Flint and Chester Roads and Lower King's Ferry Act 1835 (5 & 6 Will. 4. c. lxxxviii))
Hulton Turnpike Road Act 1826	7 Geo. 4. c. lxxxvii	5 May 1826
An Act for more effectually amending and keeping in repair the Road called The Hulton Turnpike Road lying between Knocket Wall Brook and the White Horse in West Houghton, in the County Palatine of Lancaster.
Rotherham and Pleasley Turnpike Road Act 1826 (repealed)	7 Geo. 4. c. lxxxviii	5 May 1826
An Act for amending, repairing and maintaining the Turnpike Road from the South End of the Town of Rotherham in the County of York, to the present Turnpike Road near Pleasley in the County of Derby. (Repealed by Rotherham and Pleasley Turnpike Road Act 1852 (15 & 16 Vict. c. xciv))
Tinsley and Doncaster Turnpike Road Act 1826 (repealed)	7 Geo. 4. c. lxxxix	5 May 1826
An Act for amending, repairing and maintaining the Turnpike Road from Tinsley in the County of York to the Town of Doncaster in the said County. (Repealed by Tinsley and Doncaster Turnpike Road Act 1841 (4 & 5 Vict. c. cix))
St. Marylebone and Finchley Turnpike Road and Branch Act 1826 or the Finchley Road Act 1826	7 Geo. 4. c. xc	5 May 1826
An Act for making a Turnpike Road from Saint Johns Chanel, in the Parish of Saint Mary le bone, to the North East End of Ballard's Lane, abutting upon the North Road in the Parish of Finchley, with a Branch therefrom, in the County of Middlesex.
Road from Paddington to Harrow-on-the-Hill Act 1826 (repealed)	7 Geo. 4. c. xci	5 May 1826
An Act for more effectually repairing and improving the Road leading from Paddington to Harrow on the Hill in the County of Middlesex; and for making certain new Lines of Road to communicate with the same. (Repealed by Metropolis Roads Act 1826 (7 Geo. 4. c. cxlii))
Newton Bushell, South Bovey and Moretonhampstead Roads Act 1826 (repealed)	7 Geo. 4. c. xcii	5 May 1826
An Act for more effectually repairing and improving several Roads leading to and from the Towns of Newton Bushell, South Bovey and Moretonhampstead in the County of Devon. (Repealed by Annual Turnpike Acts Continuance Act 1872 (35 & 36 Vict. c. 85))
Gomersal and Dewsbury Roads (Yorks. West Riding) Act 1826 (repealed)	7 Geo. 4. c. xciii	5 May 1826
An Act for making and maintaining a Turnpike Road from Gomersal to Dewsbury in the West Riding of the County of York, with Two Branch Roads therefrom. (Repealed by Gomersal and Dewsbury Turnpike Roads Act 1855 (18 & 19 Vict. c. ciii))
Leominster Canal Act 1826	7 Geo. 4. c. xciv	26 May 1826
An Act for enabling the Company of Proprietors of the Leominster Canal to raise further Sums of Money to discharge their Debts and to complete the Canal, and for amending the Acts for making and maintaining the said Canal, and for granting to the said Company further and other Powers.
Birmingham and Liverpool Junction Canal Act 1826 (repealed)	7 Geo. 4. c. xcv	26 May 1826
An Act for making a navigable Canal from the Staffordshire and Worcestershire Canal, in the Parish of Teitenhall in the County of Stafford, to the United Navigation of the Ellesmere and Chester Canals, in the Parish of Acton in the County Palatine of Chester. (Repealed by Ellesmere and Chester Canal Company Act 1845 (8 & 9 Vict. c. ii))
Kensington Canal Act 1826	7 Geo. 4. c. xcvi	26 May 1826
An Act to amend an Act (Note: Kensington Canal Act 1824 (5 Geo. 4. c. lxv)) for making a Canal from Counters Bridge, on the Road from London to Hammersmith, to the River Thames, in the County of Middlesex; and to enable the Kensington Canal Company to raise a further Sum of Money for the Completion of the said Canal.
River Dun Navigation Act 1826	7 Geo. 4. c. xcvii	26 May 1826
An Act for improving the Navigation of the River Dun, and for altering the Course thereof, by making certain new Cuts or Canals from the same; and for amending, altering and enlarging the Powers granted to the Company of Proprietors by several Acts now in force.
Edinburgh and Dalkeith Railway Act 1826	7 Geo. 4. c. xcviii	26 May 1826
An Act for making and maintaining a Railway from Edinburgh to the South Side of the River North Esk, near Dalkeith and Newbattle, with Branches therefrom, all in the County of Edinburgh.
Manchester and Oldham Railway Act 1826	7 Geo. 4. c. xcix	26 May 1826
An Act for making and maintaining a Railway or Tram Road from Manchester to Oldham, with a Branch from Failworth Pole to or near to Dry Clough in the Township of Royton, all in the County Palatine of Lancaster.
Hereford Railway Act 1826	7 Geo. 4. c. c	26 May 1826
An Act for making and maintaining a Tram Road or Railway from the End of the Grosmont Railway at Monmouth Cap in the Parish of Llangua in the County of Monmouth, to Wye Bridge, in the Parish of Saint Martin, within the Liberties of the City of Hereford.
Dundee and Newtyle Railway Act 1826	7 Geo. 4. c. ci	26 May 1826
An Act for making a Railway from the Royal Burgh and Port of Dundee in the County of Forfar, to Newtyle in the said County.
Dulais Railway Act 1826	7 Geo. 4. c. cii	26 May 1826
An Act for making and maintaining a Railway or Tram Road from or from near a certain Place called Aber Dulais to or near to a certain other Place called Cwm Dulais, both in the Parish of Cadoxton juxta Neath in the County of Glamorgan.
Garnkirk and Glasgow Railway Act 1826	7 Geo. 4. c. ciii	26 May 1826
An Act for making a Railway from the Monkland and Kirkintilloch Railway, by Garnkirk, to Glasgow.
St. Mary Magdalen Bermondsey, Additional Church Act 1826 (repealed)	7 Geo. 4. c. civ	26 May 1826
An Act for raising Money for building a Crypt and Tower to the additional Church erecting in the rarish or Saint Mary Magdalen Bermondsey in the County of Surrey; for vesting the said Church and the Burial Ground thereof in Trustees; and for other Purposes relating thereto. (Repealed by Bermondsey Vestry Act 1885 (48 & 49 Vict. c. cxvi))
Leith Harbour Act 1826 (repealed)	7 Geo. 4. c. cv	26 May 1826
An Act to alter and amend several Acts made in the Twenty eighth, (Note: Leith Harbour Act 1788 (28 Geo. 3. c. 58)) Thirty eighth, (Note: Leith Harbour Act 1798 (38 Geo. 3. c. xix)) Thirty ninth, (Note: Leith Harbour Act 1799 (39 Geo. 3. c. xliv)) Forty fifth, (Note: Harbour of Leith Act 1805 (45 Geo. 3. c. 114)) (Note: Leith Harbour Act 1805 (45 Geo. 3. c. xxxii)) Forty seventh (Note: Leith Harbour Act 1807 (47 Geo. 3 Sess. 2. c. iii)) and Fifty third (Note: Leith Harbour Act 1813 (53 Geo. 3. c. xxxiii)) Years of the Reign of His late Majesty, for enlarging and improving the Harbour of Leith; and to appoint Commissioners for the Superintendence and Management of the said Harbour and Docks, and for other Purposes connected therewith. (Repealed by Leith Harbour and Docks Act 1875 (38 & 39 Vict. c. clx))
Cross Keys Bridge Act 1826	7 Geo. 4. c. cvi	26 May 1826
An Act for constructing a Bridge across Sutton Wash, otherwise called Cross Keys Wash, between the Counties of Lincoln wad Norfolk.
Irvine Bridge and Harbour Act 1826	7 Geo. 4. c. cvii	26 May 1826
An Act for widening and improving the Bridge of Irvine, for making Streets communicating thereto, and for more effectually enlarging, deepening, improving and maintaining the Harbour of Irvine, in the County of Ayr.
Edinburgh Water Company's Act 1826 (repealed)	7 Geo. 4. c. cviii	26 May 1826
An Act for more effectually supplying the City of Edinburgh and Places adjacent with Water; and for supplying the Town and Port of Leith and Places adjacent, and His Majesty's Dock Yards at Leith, with Water. (Repealed by Edinburgh Corporation Order Confirmation Act 1958 (7 & 8 Eliz. 2. c. v))
Birmingham Water Act 1826 (repealed)	7 Geo. 4. c. cix	26 May 1826
An Act for supplying with Water the Town and Neighbourhood of Birmingham in the County of Warwick. (Repealed by Birmingham Waterworks Act 1855 (18 & 19 Vict. c. xxxiv))
Chester Water Act 1826 (repealed)	7 Geo. 4. c. cx	26 May 1826
An Act for better supplying the Inhabitants of the City of Chester with Water. (Repealed by Chester Waterworks Act 1857 (20 & 21 Vict. c. xi))
Nottingham Water Act 1826 (repealed)	7 Geo. 4. c. cxi	26 May 1826
An Act for better supplying with Water the Inhabitants of the Town of Nottingham and its Vicinity. (Repealed by Nottingham Waterworks Act 1845 (8 & 9 Vict. c. xix))
Inverness Gas and Water Act 1826 (repealed)	7 Geo. 4. c. cxii	26 May 1826
An Act for lighting the Royal Burgh of Inverness, Suburbs thereof and Places adjacent, with Gas, and supplying the same with Water. (Repealed by Inverness Gas and Water Act 1847 (10 & 11 Vict. c. xxviii))
St. Mary Abbotts Kensington Poor Relief Act 1826 (repealed)	7 Geo. 4. c. cxiii	26 May 1826
An Act for amending and enlarging the Powers of an Act passed in the Seventeenth Year of the Reign of His late Majesty, (Note: Kensington (Poor Relief) Act 1777 (17 Geo. 3. c. 64)) for the better Relief and Employment of the Poor of the Parish of Saint Mary Abbotts Kensington in the County of Middlesex, and for other Purposes therein mentioned; and for better regulating the said Parish. (Repealed by London Government (Borough of Kensington) Order in Council 1901 (SR&O 1901/271))
St. Bride Fleet Street Poor Relief Act 1826 (repealed)	7 Geo. 4. c. cxiv	26 May 1826
An Act to amend an Act of the Thirty ninth Year of His late Majesty, (Note: St. Bride, Fleet Street, Poor Relief Act 1799 (39 Geo. 3. c. iv)) for the better Relief and Employment of the Poor, of the Parish of Saint Bridget, otherwise Saint Bride, Fleet Street, in the City of London. (Repealed by Statute Law (Repeals) Act 2008 (c. 12))
Edinburgh Improvement Act 1826 (repealed)	7 Geo. 4. c. cxv	26 May 1826
An Act to explain and amend an Act of the Third Year of the Reign of His present Majesty, intituled "An Act for watching, cleansing and lighting the Streets of the City of Edinburgh and adjoining Districts; for regulating the Police thereof; and for other Purposes relating thereto." (Note: Edinburgh Improvement Act 1822 (3 Geo. 4. c. lxxviii)) (Repealed by Edinburgh Municipal and Police Act 1879 (42 & 43 Vict. c. cxxxii))
St. Botolph-without-Aldersgate Tithes Act 1826 (repealed)	7 Geo. 4. c. cxvi	26 May 1826
An Act tor extinguishing Tithes and Customary Payments in lieu of Tithes within that Part of the Parish of Saint Botolph without Aldersgate which is situate in the City of London, and for making Compensation in lieu thereof; and for increasing the Provision for the Incumbent of the same Parish. (Repealed by City of London (Various Powers) Act 1950 (14 Geo. 6. c. v))
Oldham Improvement Act 1826 or the Oldham Police Act 1826 (repealed)	7 Geo. 4. c. cxvii	26 May 1826
An Act for paving, watching, fighting, cleansing and improving the Township of Oldham in the County Lancaster, and for regulating the Police thereof. (Repealed by Oldham Borough Improvement Act 1865 (28 & 29 Vict. c. cccxi))
Stockport Improvement Act 1826 (repealed)	7 Geo. 4. c. cxviii	26 May 1826
An Act for lighting, cleansing, watching and otherwise improving the Streets, Lanes and other public Passages and Places within the Town of Stockport in the County Palatine of Chester, and for regulating the Police of the said Town. (Repealed by Stockport Improvement Act 1837 (7 Will. 4 & 1 Vict. c. cxxix))
Anderston Improvement Act 1826 (repealed)	7 Geo. 4. c. cxix	26 May 1826
An Act for regulating the Police of the Burgh of Anderston and Lands of Lancefield and others adjoining the said Burgh, in the County of Lanark, paving, cleansing and lighting the Streets and Passages of the said District, and for erecting a Court House and Gaol therein. (Repealed by Anderston Improvement Act 1843 (6 & 7 Vict. c. cv))
Sunderland Improvement Act 1826 (repealed)	7 Geo. 4. c. cxx	26 May 1826
An Act for paving, lighting, watching, cleansing and improving the Town and Parish of Sunderland near the Sea in the County of Durham; for removing the Market; and for otherwise improving the said Town. (Repealed by Borough of Sunderland Act 1851 (14 & 15 Vict. c. lxvii))
St. George Hanover Square Improvement Act 1826 (repealed)	7 Geo. 4. c. cxxi	26 May 1826
An Act for better paving, lighting, regulating and improving the Parish of Saint George Hanover Square, within the Liberty of the City of Westminster. (Repealed by London Government (City of Westminster) Order in Council 1901 (SR&O 1901/278))
Kent and Sussex Marsh Lands Drainage Act 1826	7 Geo. 4. c. cxxii	26 May 1826
An Act for more effectuaUy draining and preserving certain Marsh Lands or Low Grounds in the Parishes of Sandhurst, Newenden, Rolvenden, Tenterden, Wittersham, Ebony, Woodchurch, Appledore and Stone, in the County of Kent; and Ticehurst, Salehurst, Bodiam, Ewhurst, Northiam, Beckly, Peasmarsh, Iden and Playden, in the County of Sussex.
Irish Company for Promoting Manufactures Act 1826	7 Geo. 4. c. cxxiii	26 May 1826
An Act to amend and alter an Act passed in the last Session of Parliament, intituled "An Act for establishing a Joint Stock Company for the Erection of Buildings and establishing Machinery for the Purpose of promoting and encouraging Manufactures in Ireland." (Note: Irish Company for Promoting Manufactures Act 1825 (6 Geo. 4. c. cxli))
American and Colonial Steam Navigation Company Act 1826	7 Geo. 4. c. cxxiv	26 May 1826
An Act to amend an Act of the last Session of Parliament, (Note: American and Colonial Steam Navigation Company Act 1825 (6 Geo. 4. c. clxvii)) for facilitating Intercourse by Steam Navigation between the United Kingdom and the Continent and islands of America and the West Indies.
New Cross Turnpike Roads Act 1826	7 Geo. 4. c. cxxv	26 May 1826
An Act for more effectually repairing and improving certain Roads in the Counties of Kent and Surrey, commonly called The New Cross Turnpike Roads.
Whitecross and Beverley Road Act 1826	7 Geo. 4. c. cxxvi	26 May 1826
An Act for more effectually repairing the Road from Whitecross, in the Parish of Leven, in Holderness, in the East Riding of the County of York, to the Town of Beverley in the said County.
Halifax to Sheffield Road (Third District) Act 1826 (repealed)	7 Geo. 4. c. cxxvii	26 May 1826
An Act for more effectually repairing the Road from Halifax to Sheffield, in the West Riding of the County of York, so far as relates to the Third District of the said Road, and for diverting and altering the said District of Road. (Repealed by Halifax to Sheffield Road (Third District) Act 1837 (7 Will. 4 & 1 Vict. c. xxxiii))
Forfar Roads Act 1826	7 Geo. 4. c. cxxviii	26 May 1826
An Act tor making, amending, widening, repairing and keeping in Repair certain Roads in the County of Forfar.
Shipley and Bramley Road (Yorkshire) Act 1826 (repealed)	7 Geo. 4. c. cxxix	26 May 1826
An Act for making a Turnpike Road from Shipley to Brantley, together with certain Branches therefrom, in the West Riding of the County of York. (Repealed by Shipley and Bramley Turnpike Road Act 1853 (16 & 17 Vict. c. cv))
Road from Doncaster to Salter's Brook Bridge Act 1826	7 Geo. 4. c. cxxx	26 May 1826
An Act for more effectually improving the Roads from Lancaster to Salter's Brook Bridge, and for diverting and altering the said Roads, and making certain Branches therefrom, in the County of York.
Sudbury and Bury St. Edmunds Road Act 1826 (repealed)	7 Geo. 4. c. cxxxi	26 May 1826
An Act for more effectually repairing the Road from Sudbury in the County of Suffolk, to Bury Saint Edmunds in the said County. (Repealed by Statute Law (Repeals) Act 2008 (c. 12))
Cranford Bridge and Maidenhead Bridge Road Act 1826 (repealed)	7 Geo. 4. c. cxxxii	26 May 1826
An Act for more effectually repairing, widening and improving the Roads from Cranford Bridge in the County of Middlesex to that End of Maidenhead Bridge which lies in the County of Bucks, and from Slough to Eton Town End, and from Langley Broom to Datchet Bridge in the said County of Bucks; and for watering the said Roads. (Repealed by Cranford Bridge and Maidenhead Bridge Road Act 1841 (4 & 5 Vict. c. xxxiii))
Glasgow and Kilmarnock Road Act 1826	7 Geo. 4. c. cxxxiii	26 May 1826
An Act for making a Road from the Foot of the Salt Market of Glasgow to the Kilmarnock or Cathcart Turnpike Road, and for building a Bridge in the Line thereof across the River Clyde from Glasgow to Hutchisontown.
Markfield Turnpike and Snape Gate Road Act 1826	7 Geo. 4. c. cxxxiv	26 May 1826
An Act for more effectually repairing the Road from Markfield Turnpike to the Road leading from Loughborough to Ashby de la Zouch in the County of Leicester.
Parton and Monkland Mill Road (Herefordshire and Worcestershire) Act 1826	7 Geo. 4. c. cxxxv	26 May 1826
An Act for more effectually repairing the Road leading from the Willersley Turnpike Road near Parton to Monkland Mill, and other Roads therein mentioned, in the Counties of Hereford and Worcester.
Wells next the Sea and Fakenham Turnpike Road Act 1826 (repealed)	7 Geo. 4. c. cxxxvi	26 May 1826
An Act for making a Turnpike Road from Wells next the Sea to Fakenham, with a Branch therefrom, all in the County of Norfolk. (Repealed by Wells next the Sea and Fakenham Turnpike Road Act 1828 (9 Geo. 4. c. ci))
Swindon and Marlborough Road Act 1826	7 Geo. 4. c. cxxxvii	26 May 1826
An Act for more effectually repairing the Road from the Turnpike Road at or near the Town of Swindon to the North End of the Town of Marlborough in the County of Wilts.
Pendleton Roads (Lancashire) Act 1826 (repealed)	7 Geo. 4. c. cxxxviii	26 May 1826
An Act for more effectually repairing and improving several Roads leading to and from the Town of Selford, through Pendleton and other Places therein mentioned, in the County Palatine of Lancaster, and several other Roads therein mentioned; and for making and maintaining certain Diversions or new Lines of Road to communicate therewith. (Repealed by Pendleton Roads Act 1853 (16 & 17 Vict. c. cxxxv))
Limerick and Waterford Railway Act 1826	7 Geo. 4. c. cxxxix	31 May 1826
An Act for making and maintaining a Railway or Tramroad from the City of Limerick to the Town of Carrick in the County of Tipperary, with several Branches therefrom in the County of Tipperary aforesaid and in the County of the City of Waterford.
Regent's Canal Act 1826	7 Geo. 4. c. cxl	31 May 1826
An Act to amend an Act of His late Majesty's Reign, (Note: Grand Junction Canal Company and Paddington Water Supply Act 1811 (51 Geo. 3. c. clxix)) for confirming certain Articles of Agreement between the Company of Proprietors of the Grand Junction Canal and certain Persons, for supplying with Water the Inhabitants of Paddington and Places adjacent in the County of Middlesex; and also an Act of His said late Majesty's Reign, (Note: Regent's Canal Water Act 1819 (59 Geo. 3. c. cxi)) to alter certain Acts relating to the Grand Junction Canal, the Grand Junction Waterworks and the Regent's Canal, in order to effect an Exchange of Water for the better Supply of the Regent's Canal Navigation and Grand Junction Waterworks; and for amending the Powers vested in the Grand Junction Waterworks Company; and for other Purposes relating thereto.
Shrewsbury Poor Relief Act 1826 (repealed)	7 Geo. 4. c. cxli	31 May 1826
An Act to repeal an Act of the Twenty fourth Year of His late Majesty King George the Third, (Note: Shrewsbury (Poor Relief) Act 1784 (24 Geo. 3. Sess. 2. c. 15)) for the better Relief and Employment of the Poor belonging to several Parishes within the Town of Shrewsbury, and the Liberties thereof, in the County of Salop; and to make other Provisions in lieu thereof. (Repealed by Statute Law (Repeals) Act 2013 (c. 2))
Metropolis Roads Act 1826 or the Metropolis Turnpike Roads North of the Thames Act 1826 (repealed)	7 Geo. 4. c. cxlii	31 May 1826
An Act for consolidating the Trusts of the several Turnpike Roads in the Neighbourhood of the Metropolis, North of the River Thames. (Repealed by Annual Turnpike Acts Continuance Act 1871 (34 & 35 Vict. c. 115))

=== Private acts ===
Short title	Citation	Royal assent
Long title
Netherthong Inclosure Act 1826	7 Geo. 4. c. 1 Pr.	22 March 1826
An Act for dividing, allotting and inclosing Lands in the Township of Netherthong, in the Parish of Almondbury, in the West Riding of the County of York.
West Lydford Inclosure etc. Act 1826	7 Geo. 4. c. 2 Pr.	22 March 1826
An Act for inclosing and exonerating from Tithes Lands in the Parish of West Lydford in the County of Somerset.
Anthorn Inclosure Act 1826	7 Geo. 4. c. 3 Pr.	22 March 1826
An Act for inclosing Lands within the Township, Division or Quarter of Anthorn, in the Parish of Bowness in the County of Cumberland.
Whitle Inclosure Act 1826	7 Geo. 4. c. 4 Pr.	22 March 1826
An Act for dividing, alloting and inclosing the Commons or Waste Lands in the Hamlet of Whitley in the Parish of Glossop in the County of Derby.
Dilham Inclosure Act 1826	7 Geo. 4. c. 5 Pr.	11 April 1826
An Act for inclosing Lands in the Parish of Dilham in the County of Norfolk.
Farlesthorpe Inclosure Act 1826	7 Geo. 4. c. 6 Pr.	11 April 1826
An Act for inclosing Lands in the Parish of Farlesthorpe in the County of Lincoln.
Hopton Inclosure Act 1826	7 Geo. 4. c. 7 Pr.	11 April 1826
An Act for inclosing Lands in the Parish of Hopton, within the Liberty of Bury Saint Edmunds, in the County of Suffolk.
Charles Coffin's Estate Act 1826	7 Geo. 4. c. 8 Pr.	5 May 1826
An Act for vesting an Estate at Diss in the County of Norfolk, Part of the Settled Estates of the Reverend Charles Pine Coffin, contracted to be sold to Meadows Taylor Gentleman, upon Trust to complete the Sale thereof; and to apply Part of the Purchase Money in discharge of a Mortgage affecting such Estate, and the Residue in the Purchase of other Estates, to be settled to the same Uses.
Strode's Free School Act 1826	7 Geo. 4. c. 9 Pr.	5 May 1826
An Act for enabling the Master, Wardens or Keepers of the Commonalty of Freemen of the Mystery of Coopers, London, and of the Suburbs of the same City, to purchase and hold in Mortmain a Piece of Land adjoining the Free School at Egham in the County of Surrey, founded by Henry Strode, as Trustees for the Purposes of the said Charity.
Lorton Inclosure Act 1826	7 Geo. 4. c. 10 Pr.	5 May 1826
An Act for inclosing Lands in Lorton, in the Manor of Derwentfells in the County of Cumberland.
Wolverton Inclosure Act 1826	7 Geo. 4. c. 11 Pr.	5 May 1826
An Act for inclosing Lands in the Manor and Parish of Wolverton in the County of Warwick.
Anstey Inclosure Act 1826	7 Geo. 4. c. 12 Pr.	5 May 1826
An Act for inclosing Lands in the Parish of Anstey in the County of Hertford.
Kentford Inclosure etc. Act 1826	7 Geo. 4. c. 13 Pr.	5 May 1826
Ad Act for inclosing Lands in the Parish of Kentford in the County of Suffolk.
West and East Ardsley Inclosure Act 1826	7 Geo. 4. c. 14 Pr.	5 May 1826
An Act for inclosing and exonerating from Tithes Lands in the Parishes of West Ardsley otherwise Woodchurch, and East Ardsley, in the West Riding of the County of York.
Norwell Inclosure etc. Act 1826	7 Geo. 4. c. 15 Pr.	5 May 1826
An Act for inclosing and exonerating from Tithes Lands in the Parish of Norwell in the County of Nottingham.
Forest of Salcey Inclosure Act 1826	7 Geo. 4. c. 16 Pr.	5 May 1826
An Act for subdividing, allotting and inclosing the Allotment directed to be set out by an Act of the last Session of Parliament, (Note: Salcey Forest Act 1825 (6 Geo. 4. c. 132)) for inclosing the Forest of Salcey, in the Counties of Northampton and Buckingham, to the several Owners and Proprietors of Lands claiming Rights of Common in and over the said Forest.
Songhton Inclosure Act 1826	7 Geo. 4. c. 17 Pr.	5 May 1826
An Act for inclosing Lands in the Township of Soughton in the Parish of Northup in the County of Flint.
Snelston Inclosure Act 1826	7 Geo. 4. c. 18 Pr.	5 May 1826
An Act to alter and amend an Act of His present Majesty's Reign, (Note: Snelston Inclosure Act 1824 (5 Geo. 4. c. 1 Pr.)) for inclosing Lands in the Parish of Snelston in the County of Derby.
Griffin's Estate Act 1826	7 Geo. 4. c. 19 Pr.	26 May 1826
An Act for enabling the Trustees under the Will of Benjamin Griffin, deceased, to grant Building and other Leases of Parts of the Estates thereby devised, situate in the Parishes of Saint Mary Lambeth in the County of Surrey, and Saint Clement Danes in the County of Middlesex.
Lee Acton's Estate Act 1826	7 Geo. 4. c. 20 Pr.	26 May 1826
An Act to extend and amend the Powers of an Act passed in the Forty eighth Year of the Reign of His late Majesty, intituled "An Act to enable Nathaniel Lee Acton Esquire, and others, to grant Building Leases of Lands at and near Hackney in the County of Middlesex, divised by the Will of the late Baptist Lee Esquire." (Note: Lee's Estate Act 1808 (48 Geo. 3. c. cxxiii))
Baird's Will Act 1826	7 Geo. 4. c. 21 Pr.	26 May 1826
An Act for carrying into Effect a Contract entered into, for the Sale of certain Tithes and other Hereditaments in the County of Northumberland, settled by the Will of William Baird Esquire, deceased, to Hugh Duke of Northumberland, (Note: Hugh Percy, 3rd Duke of Northumberland.) and for applying the Money thence arising in the Purchase of other Estates to be settled to the same Uses.
St. Paul Shadwell Rectory (Middlesex) Act 1826	7 Geo. 4. c. 22 Pr.	26 May 1826
An Act for building a Parsonage House for the Rector of the Parish of Saint Paul Shadwell in the County of Middlesex; and for enabling such Rector to grant Building Leases of Part of the Rectory Land; and for other Purposes.
Fleming's Estate Act 1826	7 Geo. 4. c. 23 Pr.	26 May 1826
An Act for empowering the Judges of the Court of Session in Scotland to sell certain Parts of the Lands and Barony of Bigger and Lands and Barony of Boghall, entailed by Sir Michael Bruce of Stenhouse Baronet, (Note: Sir Michael Bruce, 8th Baronet of Stenhouse.) now belonging to Vice Admiral the Honourable Charles Fleming; (Note: Charles Fleeming.) and to apply the Price to be obtained for the same in the Payment of the Debts affecting the said Estate.
Sekforde's Almshouse Act 1826	7 Geo. 4. c. 24 Pr.	26 May 1826
An Act for enabling the Governors of the Hospital of the Poor or Almshouse called Sekforde's Almshouse, in Woodbridge in the County of Suffolk, to grant building and other Leases of their Estates situate in the Parish of Saint James Clerkenwell in the County of Middlesex, and for other Purposes for the Benefit of the said Hospital.
Eton College Estate Act 1826	7 Geo. 4. c. 25 Pr.	26 May 1826
An Act to enable the Provost and College of Eton, in the County of Bucks, to grant Building Leases of Lands in the Parishes of Hampstead and Mary le bone, in the County of Middlesex, and for other Purposes.
Stowlangtoft Rectory Act 1826	7 Geo. 4. c. 26 Pr.	26 May 1826
An Act for confirming an Exchange made of certain Parts of the Glebe Lands of the Rectory of Stowlangtoft in the County of Suffolk.
Waghen Rectory Act 1826	7 Geo. 4. c. 27 Pr.	26 May 1826
An Act to confirm an Award made for ascertaining the Glebe Lands of the Rectory Appropriate of Waghen in the County of York, and for dividing the same from the Fee Simple Estates of the late Joseph Windham Esquire, situate in the Parish of Waghen aforesaid.
Rugby School Act 1826	7 Geo. 4. c. 28 Pr.	26 May 1826
An Act for amending and enlarging the Powers of an Act of the Seventeenth Year of the Reign of His late Majesty King George the Third, (Note: Rugby School and Alms-houses Act 1777 (17 Geo. 3. c. 57 Pr.)) and of another Act of the Fifty fourth Year of the Reign of the same King, (Note: Rugby School's Estate Act 1814 (54 Geo. 3. c. cxxxi)) for enabling the Feoffees and Trustees of an Estate in the County of Middlesex, given by Lawrence Sheriff, for the founding and maintaining a School and Almshouses at Rugby in the County of Warwick, to sell Part of the said Estate, or to grant Leases thereof, and for other Purposes.
Bedford School Act 1826 or the Harpur Trust Act 1826	7 Geo. 4. c. 29 Pr.	26 May 1826
An Act for the better Management and Disposition of the Estates given by Sir William Harpur Knight, and Dame Alice his Wife, for a free and perpetual School in the Town of Bedford, and other Purposes, and of the Rents and Profits thereof.
Duke of Gordon's Estate Act 1826	7 Geo. 4. c. 30 Pr.	26 May 1826
An Act for carrying into Effect an Exchange of the Lands and Estate of Alves Kirkion, situated in the Shire of Elgin and Forres, belonging to His Grace Alexander Duke of Gordon, for certain entailed Salmon Fishings in the River Spey, of the Right Honourable Francis Earl of Moray, situated in the same Shire.
Melton Mowbray Town Lands Act 1826	7 Geo. 4. c. 31 Pr.	26 May 1826
An Act for vesting certain Messuages, Cottage Gardens and other Premises, (being Parts of the Estates of the Feoffees in Trust for the Benefit of the Inhabitants of Melton Mowbray, in the County of Leicester,) in Trustees, to be sold, and for laying out the Purchase Monies in the Purchase of other Estates, to be vested in the same Feoffees upon the same Trusts.
Genuine Beer Brewery Company (Dissolution) Act 1826	7 Geo. 4. c. 32 Pr.	26 May 1826
An Act for dissolving a certain Partnership Company known by the Name of "The Genuine Beer Brewery," and for enabling the Directors and Trustees thereof to dispose of the Estates and Effects of the Concern, and divide the Surplus, after Payment of Debts and Expences, amongst the Shareholders of the Capital Stock therein, and other Purposes.
Bristowe's Estate Act 1826	7 Geo. 4. c. 33 Pr.	26 May 1826
An Act for vesting the Settled Estates of Samuel Ellis Bristowe Esquire, situate in the County of Derby, and certain Parts of his Settled Estates in the County of Nottingham, in Trust, to be sold; and for laying out the Purchase Money in other Estates, to be settled to the same Uses.
Ann Meyrick's Estate Act 1826	7 Geo. 4. c. 34 Pr.	26 May 1826
An Act for vesting the Fee of certain Settled Estates, late of Ann Elizabeth Meyrick deceased, situate in the Counties of Devon, Dorset and Wilts, in Trustees, upon Trust, to sell, and apply the Purchase Monies in discharging certain Incumbrances.
Wenlock's Barn Prebend Act 1826	7 Geo. 4. c. 35 Pr.	26 May 1826
An Act for enabling the Prebendary of the Prebend of Wenlock's Barn to purchase, for the Benefit of himself and his Successors, the Hereditaments comprised in a certain Indenture of Lease, for the Residue of the Term thereby demised; and to grant Building Leases of the same Hereditaments; and for other Purposes.
Brownswood Prebend (Saint Paul's Cathedral) Act 1826	7 Geo. 4. c. 36 Pr.	26 May 1826
An Act to confirm a Contract entered into for granting Sub Leases for building on Lands within the Manor of Brownswood in the County of Middlesex, Parcel oi the Prebend of Brwomswood, founded in the Cathedral Church of Saint Paul in London; and to enlarge the Powers of an Act passed in the Second Year of the Reign of His present Majesty King George the Fourth, intituled "An Act to enable the Prebendary of the Prebend of Brownswood in the County of Middlesex, founded in the Cathedral Church of Saint Paul in London, to grant a Lease of the Manor of Brownswood in the said County, Parcel of the said Prebend, in manner therein mentioned, and to enable the granting of Sub Leases for building thereon, and otherwise improving the same, and for other Purposes;" (Note: Brownswood Prebend (Saint Paul's Cathedral) Act 1821 (1 & 2 Geo. 4. c. 44 Pr.)) and to amend the same Act; and to authorize the Redemption of the Land Tax payable in respect of the said Manor, and the Lands and Hereditaments within the same; and for other Purposes.
Rhodes's Estate Act 1826	7 Geo. 4. c. 37 Pr.	26 May 1826
An Act for empowering the Trustees under the Will of Samuel Rhodes Esquire, deceased, to grant Building Leases, and for other Purposes.
Henry Wise's and Thomas Cubitt's Estates Act 1826	7 Geo. 4. c. 38 Pr.	26 May 1826
An Act for confirming certain Articles of Agreement between the Reverend Henry Wise and Thomas Cubitt, and for authorizing the granting of Building Leases of Ground in the Parishes of Saint George Hanover Square and Saint John the Evangelist Westminster, pursuant to the said Articles; and for other Purposes.
Powlett's Estate Act 1826	7 Geo. 4. c. 39 Pr.	26 May 1826
An Act for enabling the Trustees to sell, under the Authority of the Court of Chancery, the Real Estates devised by the Will and Codicils of William Powlett Powlett Esquire, deceased, for the Purpose of raising Money to discharge the Debts and Incumbrances affecting the same Estates.
Cary's Estate Act 1826	7 Geo. 4. c. 40 Pr.	26 May 1826
An Act for establishing certain Leases granted by George Cary Esquire, of certain Lands and Hereditaments situate and being in the several Parishes of Tormohan and Saint Mary Church, in the County of Devon, Parcel of his Settled Estates; and to enable him to grant Leases of other Parts of his said Settled Estates; and for other Purposes therein mentioned.
Kingswinford Rectory Act 1826	7 Geo. 4. c. 41 Pr.	26 May 1826
An Act for effecting a Sale of Part of the Glebe Lands belonging to the Rectory of Kingswinford otherwise Swynford Regis in the County of Stafford, and the Mines in and under the same, to the Right Honourable John William Viscount Dudley and Ward; and for other Purposes.
Crummer's Estate Act 1826	7 Geo. 4. c. 42 Pr.	26 May 1826
An Act for vesting in a Trustee the legal Estate in Fee Simple of divers Messuages, Lands, Tenements and other Hereditaments, mortgaged and conveyed in Trust to James Crummer Esquire, deceased.
Felpham Allotment Act 1826	7 Geo. 4. c. 43 Pr.	26 May 1826
An Act for dividing, allotting and otherwise improving Lands in the Parish of Felpham in the County of Sussex.
Foxton Inclosure Act 1826	7 Geo. 4. c. 44 Pr.	26 May 1826
An Act for inclosing Lands in the Parish of Foxton in the County of Cambridge.
Ripon Inclosure etc. Act 1826	7 Geo. 4. c. 45 Pr.	26 May 1826
An Act for dividing, allotting and inclosing, and exonerating from Average Rents, and enfranchising, certain Copyhold and Leasehold Lands within the Township and Parish of Ripon in the County of York.
Pedlar's Acre Estate (Saint Mary Lambeth) Act 1826 (repealed)	7 Geo. 4. c. 46 Pr.	31 May 1826
An Act for vesting Pedlars Acre Estate, situate in the Parish of Saint Mary Lambeth in the County of Surrey, in Trustees, for letting the same, and for applying the Produce thereof according to the Directions of the Vestry of the said Parish. (Repealed by London Government (Borough of Lambeth) Order in Council 1901 (SR&O 1901/219))
Adderley's Estate Act 1826 (Note: This act was not printed by the King's Printer.)	7 Geo. 4. c. 47 Pr.	5 May 1826
An Act for vesting the settled undivided Shares of Ralph Adderley Esquire, and Rosamond his Wife, and John Robert Browne Cave Esquire, and Catherine Penelope his Wife, of and in certain Hereditaments in the County of Derby, in Trustees, and their Heirs, upon Trust to convey the same in the Manner therein mentioned, for the Purposes of effectuating an Agreement entered into with the Reverend Richard Rowland Ward Clerk.
Patrick Threipland of Fingask Restoration Act 1826	7 Geo. 4. c. 48 Pr.	26 May 1826
An Act for the Restoration of Patrick Murray Threipland of Fingask to the Dignity of a Baronet.
Baron Wemyss Restoration Act 1826	7 Geo. 4. c. 49 Pr.	26 May 1826
An Act to restore Francis Baron Wemyss and others from the Effects of the Attainder of David Wemyss, commonly called Lord Elcho.
David Ogilvy Restoration Act 1826	7 Geo. 4. c. 50 Pr.	26 May 1826
An Act to restore David Ogilvy Esquire and others from the Effects of the Attainders of James eldest Son of David Earl of Airlie, and of David Ogilvy, taking upon himself the Title of Lord Ogilvy.
James Sutherland Restoration Act 1826 (Note: There is no copy of this act in the Parliamentary Archives.)	7 Geo. 4. c. 51 Pr.	26 May 1826
An Act for the Restoration of James Sutherland Esquire to the Dignity and Title of Baron Duffus.
Robert Dalzell Restoration Act 1826	7 Geo. 4. c. 52 Pr.	26 May 1826
An Act for the Restoration of Major General Robert Alexander Dalzell to the Dignity and Title of Earl of Carnwath.
Chilthorne Domer Inclosure Act 1826	7 Geo. 4. c. 53 Pr.	26 May 1826
An Act for dividing, allotting and inclosing the open and common Lands within the Parish of Chilthorne Domer in the County of Somerset, and exonerating from Tithes Part thereof.
Saint George's Divorce Act 1826	7 Geo. 4. c. 54 Pr.	26 May 1826
An Act to dissolve the Marriage of Stepney Saint George Esquire with Anne his now Wife, and to enable him to marry again, and for other Purposes therein mentioned.
Viscount Lismore's Divorce Act 1826	7 Geo. 4. c. 55 Pr.	26 May 1826
An Act to dissolve the Marriage of the Right Honourable Cornelius Viscount Lismore, of the Kingdom of Ireland, with Eleanor Viscountess Lismore his now Wife, and to enable him to marry again, and for other Purposes therein mentioned.
Johnston's Divorce Act 1826	7 Geo. 4. c. 56 Pr.	26 May 1826
An Act to dissolve the Marriage of Christian Frederick Charles Alexander James Johnston £squire with Elizabeth Jane Henrietta Johnston his now wife, and to enable him to marry again, and for other Purposes therein mentioned.
Wille's Naturalization Act 1826	7 Geo. 4. c. 57 Pr.	26 May 1826
An Act for naturalizing Charles Frederick Wille.
Mencke's Naturalization Act 1826	7 Geo. 4. c. 58 Pr.	26 May 1826
An Act for naturalizing John Christian Mencke.
Campbell's Naturalization Act 1826	7 Geo. 4. c. 59 Pr.	26 May 1826
An Act for naturalizing Frederick Campbell Esquire.

=== Sources ===
- The Statutes of the United Kingdom of Great Britain and Ireland, 7 George IV. 1826. London. 1826 – via Internet Archive.
- The Statutes of the United Kingdom of Great Britain and Ireland, 7 George IV. 1826. London. 1826 – via Google Books.
- Journals of the House of Commons. Vol. 81. London: His Majesty's Stationery Office. pp. 3–392 – via Google Books.

== 7 & 8 Geo. 4 ==
The first session of the 8th Parliament of the United Kingdom, which met from 14 November 1826 until 2 July 1827.

This session was also traditionally cited as 7 & 8 G. 4.

=== Public general acts ===
Short title	Citation	Royal assent
Long title
Supply (No. 2) Act 1826 (repealed)	7 & 8 Geo. 4. c. 1	13 December 1826
An act for applying a Sum of Money for the Service of the Year One thousand eight hundred and twenty seven. (Repealed by Statute Law Revision Act 1873 (36 & 37 Vict. c. 91))
Exchequer Bills (No. 3) Act 1826 (repealed)	7 & 8 Geo. 4. c. 2	13 December 1826
An act for raising the Sum of Ten Millions, by Exchequer Bills, for the Service of the Year One thousand eight hundred and twenty seven. (Repealed by Statute Law Revision Act 1873 (36 & 37 Vict. c. 91))
Importation Act 1826 (repealed)	7 & 8 Geo. 4. c. 3	13 December 1826
An act to confirm an Order in Council for allowing the Importation of Foreign Oats, Oatmeal, Rye, Pease, and Beans; to indemnify all Persons who have advised or acted in execution of the same; and to permit the Importation of such Articles until the Fifteenth Day of February One thousand eight hundred and twenty seven. (Repealed by Statute Law Revision Act 1873 (36 & 37 Vict. c. 91))

=== Sources ===
- Simons, N., ed. (1829). "7° & 8° Georgii IV". The Statutes of the United Kingdom of Great Britain and Ireland. Vol. The Eleventh. From A.D. 1827, 7 & 8 George IV to A.D. 1829, 10 George IV. London: Eyre and Strahan. pp. 1–318 – via Internet Archive.
- Simons, N., ed. (1829). "7° & 8° Georgii IV". The Statutes of the United Kingdom of Great Britain and Ireland. Vol. The Eleventh. From A.D. 1827, 7 & 8 George IV to A.D. 1829, 10 George IV. London: Eyre and Strahan. pp. 1–318 – via Google Books.
- The Statutes of the United Kingdom of Great Britain and Ireland, 7 & 8 George IV. 1827. London. 1827 – via Internet Archive.
- The Statutes of the United Kingdom of Great Britain and Ireland, 7 & 8 George IV. 1827. London. 1827 – via Internet Archive.
- Journal of the House of Commons. Vol. 82. London: His Majesty's Stationery Office. pp. 7–610.

== See also ==
- List of acts of the Parliament of the United Kingdom
