= List of statutory instruments of the United Kingdom, 1996 =

This is a complete list of all 2,071 statutory instruments published in the United Kingdom in the year 1996.

== 1–100 ==
- Insurance Companies (Pension Business) (Transitional Provisions) (Amendment) Regulations 1996 S.I. 1996/1
- Sea Fishing (Enforcement of Community Control Measures) (Amendment) Order 1996 S.I. 1996/2
- Occupational Pension Schemes (Deficiency on Winding Up etc.) Amendment Regulations 1996 S.I. 1996/5
- National Disability Council Regulations 1996 S.I. 1996/11
- Weymouth Harbour Revision Order 1996 S.I. 1996/15
- Road Vehicles (Construction and Use) (Amendment) Regulations 1996 S.I. 1996/16
- Friendly Societies (Gilt-edged Securities) (Periodic Accounting for Tax on Interest) Regulations 1996 S.I. 1996/21
- Civil Aviation (Canadian Navigation Services) (Third Amendment) Regulations 1996 S.I. 1996/22
- Plant Health (Great Britain) (Amendment) Order 1996 S.I. 1996/25
- Plant Health (Licence Fees) (England and Wales) Regulations 1996 S.I. 1996/26
- Hill Livestock (Compensatory Allowances) (Amendment) Regulations 1996 S.I. 1996/27
- Sheep and Goats (Records, Identification and Movement) Order 1996 S.I. 1996/28
- Food Protection (Emergency Prohibitions) (Radioactivity in Sheep) (Wales) (Partial Revocation) Order 1996 S.I. 1996/29
- Social Security (Persons From Abroad) Miscellaneous Amendments Regulations 1996 S.I. 1996/30
- Food Protection (Emergency Prohibitions) (Radioactivity in Sheep) Partial Revocation Order 1996 S.I. 1996/31
- Prisons and Young Offenders Institutions (Scotland) Amendment Rules 1996 S.I. 1996/32
- National Blood Authority (Transfer of Trust Property) Order 1996 S.I. 1996/33
- National Blood Authority (Transfer of Trust Property) (No. 2) Order 1996 S.I. 1996/34
- King's Mill Centre for Health Care Services National Health Service Trust (Transfer of Trust Property) Order 1996 S.I. 1996/35
- A41 Trunk Road (Barnet) Red Route (No. 1) Experimental Traffic Order 1996 S.I. 1996/41
- A41 Trunk Road (Barnet) Red Route (No. 2) Experimental Traffic Order 1996 (SI 1996/42)
- Local Government Changes for England (Valuation and Community Charge Tribunals) Regulations 1996 S.I. 1996/43
- Sheep Annual Premium and Suckler Cow Premium Quotas (Re-assessment of Eligibility) Regulations 1996 S.I. 1996/48
- Sheep Annual Premium (Amendment) Regulations 1996 S.I. 1996/49
- Judicial Pensions (Additional Voluntary Contributions) (Amendment) Regulations 1996 S.I. 1996/52
- Kent County Council (Wainscott Northern Bypass) Motorway Scheme 1992 Confirmation Instrument 1996 S.I. 1996/53
- Taxes (Interest Rate) (Amendment)Regulations 1996 S.I. 1996/54
- Local Government Reorganisation (Wales) (Council Tax Reduction Scheme) Order 1996 S.I. 1996/56
- Upper Spey and Associated Waters Protection (Renewal) Order 1993 Variation Order 1996 S.I. 1996/57
- River Tay Catchment Area Protection (Renewal) Order 1993 Variation Order 1996 S.I. 1996/58
- East of Abercynon—East of Dowlais Trunk Road (A4060) (Improvement of Mountain Hare to Dowlais Top) Order 1996 S.I. 1996/60
- River Teign Mussel Fishery (Variation) (Oysters) Order 1996 S.I. 1996/61
- Food Protection (Emergency Prohibitions) (Radioactivity in Sheep) (England) (Partial Revocation) Order 1996 S.I. 1996/62
- A30 Trunk Road (Hounslow and Hillingdon) Red Route (Clearway) Traffic Order 1996 S.I. 1996/63
- A41 Trunk Road (Barnet) Red Route (Prescribed Route) Experimental Traffic Order 1996 S.I. 1996/64
- Civil Courts (Amendment) Order 1996 S.I. 1996/68
- A30 Trunk Road (Great South West Road, Hounslow) Red Route (Prescribed Routes and Prohibitive Turns No. 1) Traffic Order 1996 S.I. 1996/69
- A30 Trunk Road (Great South West Road, Hounslow) Red Route (Prescribed Routes and Prohibitive Turns No. 2) Traffic Order 1996 S.I. 1996/70
- Leeds City Council (Leeds Inner Ring Road Stages 6 & 7 (A61) to M1 Motorway (Junction 46) Connecting Road) Scheme 1994 Confirmation Instrument 1996 S.I. 1996/71
- Leeds City Council (M1 Motorway Junction 46 Slip Road Connecting Road) Scheme 1992 Confirmation Instrument 1996 S.I. 1996/72
- Leeds City Council (Hunslet Viaduct) Scheme 1992 Confirmation Instrument 1996 S.I. 1996/73
- City of Stoke-on-Trent (Lichfield Street Canal Bridge) Scheme, 1995 Confirmation Instrument 1996 S.I. 1996/74
- Merchant Shipping (Distress Signals and Prevention of Collisions) Regulations 1996 S.I. 1996/75
- Civil Aviation Act (Investigation of Accidents) Regulations 1996 S.I. 1996/76
- Local Government Reorganisation (Wales) (Finance) Order 1996 S.I. 1996/88
- London Ambulance Service National Health Service Trust (Establishment) Order 1996 (SI 1996/90)
- Sussex Ambulance Service National Health Service Trust (Transfer of Trust Property) Order 1996 (SI 1996/91)
- Hull and Holderness Community Health National Health Service Trust (Transfer of Trust Property) Order 1996 S.I. 1996/92
- Land Registers (Scotland) Act 1995 (Commencement) Order 1996 S.I. 1996/94
- Non-Domestic Rate (Scotland) Order 1996 S.I. 1996/95
- Offshore Installations (Safety Zones) Order 1996 S.I. 1996/97
- A1 Trunk Road (Haringey) Red Route Traffic Order 1993 Experimental Variation Order 1996 S.I. 1996/98
- A1 Trunk Road (Islington) Red Route Traffic Order 1993 Experimental Variation No. 3 Order 1996 S.I. 1996/99

== 101–200 ==
- Industrial Training Levy (Construction Board) Order 1996 S.I. 1996/101
- Industrial Training Levy (Engineering Construction Board) Order 1996 S.I. 1996/102
- Non-Domestic Rates (Levying) (Scotland) Regulations 1996 S.I. 1996/103
- Tyne Riverside Enterprise Zones (North Tyneside) (Designation) (No. 1) Order 1996 S.I. 1996/106
- Vehicle Excise Duty (Immobilisation, Removal and Disposal of Vehicles) Regulations 1996 S.I. 1996/107
- Education (Grant-maintained Special Schools) (Amendment) Regulations 1996 S.I. 1996/111
- Yorkshire Water services Limited (Drought) Order 1996 S.I. 1996/112
- Housing Revenue Account General Fund Contribution Limits (Scotland) Order 1996 S.I. 1996/115
- Glasgow School of Art (Scotland) Order of Council 1996 S.I. 1996/120
- North Staffordshire Combined Healthcare National Health Service Trust (Transfer of Trust Property) Order 1996 S.I. 1996/124
- Civil Evidence (Family Mediation) (Scotland) Act 1995 (Commencement and Transitional Provision) Order 1996 S.I. 1996/125
- Worthing and Southlands Hospitals National Health Service Trust (Transfer of Trust Property) Order 1996 S.I. 1996/127
- Goods Vehicles (Authorisation of International Journeys) (Fees) Regulations 1995 S.I. 1996/131
- Valuation Appeal Panels and Committees (Scotland) Regulations 1996 S.I. 1996/137
- Local Government Act 1988 (Defined Activities) (Exemption) (Royal Borough of Kingston upon Thames) Order 1996 S.I. 1996/138
- Scottish Environment Protection Agency (Transfer Date) Order 1996 S.I. 1996/139
- Act of Sederunt (Civil Evidence (Family Mediation)) 1996 S.I. 1996/140
- Coast Protection (Notices) (Scotland) Amendment Regulations 1996 S.I. 1996/141
- Tameside (Ashton Northern By-Pass Stage 1 Ashton-Under-Lyne) (Special Roads) Scheme 1994 Confirmation Instrument 1996 S.I. 1996/142
- Health Authorities (Wales) Establishment Order 1996 S.I. 1997/146
- Merchant Shipping (Delegation of Type Approval) Regulations 1996 S.I. 1996/147
- Gateshead Hospitals National Health Service Trust (Transfer of Trust Property) Order 1996 S.I. 1996/148
- Gateshead Healthcare National Health Service Trust (Transfer of Trust Property) Order 1996 S.I. 1996/149
- Local Government Act 1988 (Competition) (Housing Management) (Rossendale) Regulations 1996 S.I. 1996/154
- National Savings Stock Register (Amendment) Regulations 1996 S.I. 1996/156
- County Council of Norfolk (Reconstruction of Acle Wey Bridge) Scheme 1995 Confirmation Instrument 1996 S.I. 1996/158
- County Council of Norfolk (Reconstruction of Acle Wey Bridge—Temporary Bridge) Scheme 1995 Confirmation Instrument 1996 S.I. 1996/159
- Sea Fish Industry Authority (Levy) Regulations 1995 Confirmatory Order 1996 S.I. 1996/160
- Mortgage Indemnities (Recognised Bodies) Order 1996 S.I. 1996/161
- Housing (Right to Buy) (Priority of Charges) Order 1996 S.I. 1996/162
- Road Vehicles (Construction and Use) (Amendment) (No. 2) Regulations 1996 S.I. 1996/163
- Air Passenger Duty (Prescribed Rates of Interest) (Amendment) Order 1996 S.I. 1996/164
- Value Added Tax Act 1994 (Interest on Tax) (Prescribed Rate) Order 1996 S.I. 1996/165
- Insurance Premium Tax (Prescribed Rates of Interest) (Amendment) Order 1996 S.I. 1996/166
- Public Service Vehicles (Carrying Capacity) (Amendment) Regulations 1996 S.I. 1996/167
- Local Authorities (Alteration of Requisite Calculations) Regulations 1996 S.I. 1996/175
- Local Government Changes for England (Council Tax) (Transitional Reduction) Regulations 1996 S.I. 1996/176
- National Health Service (General Dental Services) (Scotland) Regulations 1996 S.I. 1996/177
- Contracting Out (Administration of the Teachers' Superannuation Scheme) Order 1995 S.I. 1996/178
- Local Government (Wales) (Alternative Community Names) (Prescribed Steps) Regulations 1996 S.I. 1996/179
- Charities (Exception from Registration) Regulations 1996 S.I. 1996/180
- Social Security (Adjudication) and Child Support Amendment Regulations 1996 S.I. 1996/182
- Local Government Reorganisation (Wales) (Charities) Order 1996 S.I. 1996/183
- Housing (Change of Landlord) (Payment of Disposal Cost by Instalments) (Amendment) Regulations 1996 S.I. 1996/184
- Local Government Pension Scheme (Appropriate Pension Fund) Regulations 1996 S.I. 1996/185
- Environment Act 1995 (Commencement No. 5) Order 1996 S.I. 1996/186
- Land Registration Fees Order 1996 S.I. 1996/187
- Companies Act 1985 (Miscellaneous Accounting Amendments) Regulations 1996 S.I. 1996/189
- Copyright (Certification of Licensing Scheme for Educational Recording of Broadcasts) (Open University Educational Enterprises Limited) (Amendment) Order 1996 S.I. 1996/190
- Copyright (Certification of Licensing Scheme for Educational Recording of Broadcasts and Cable Programmes) (Educational Recording Agency Limited) (Amendment) Order 1996 S.I. 1996/191
- Equipment and Protective Systems Intended for Use in Potentially Explosive Atmospheres Regulations 1996 S.I. 1996/192
- Social Security (Back to Work Bonus) Regulations 1996 S.I. 1996/193
- Housing Benefit, Supply of Information and Council Tax Benefit (Amendment) Regulations 1996 S.I. 1996/194
- Employer's Contributions Re-imbursement Regulations 1996 S.I. 1996/195
- Newlyn Pier and Harbour (Revision of Constitution of Commissioners) Order 1996 S.I. 1996/197

== 201–300 ==
- A38 Trunk Road (A3064 St Budeaux Bypass Slip Roads) (Trunking) Order 1996 S.I. 1996/201
- Education (Grant) (Henrietta Barnett School) (Amendment) Regulations 1996 S.I. 1996/205
- Income Support (General) (Jobseeker's Allowance Consequential Amendments) Regulations 1996 S.I. 1996/206
- Jobseeker's Allowance Regulations 1996 S.I. 1996/207
- Local Government Act 1988 (Defined Activities) (Exemption) (London Borough of Hillingdon Council) Order 1996 S.I. 1996/208
- Value Added Tax (Amendment) Regulations 1996 S.I. 1996/210
- Motor Vehicles (Driving Licences) (Amendment) Regulations 1996 S.I. 1996/211
- Motor Vehicles (Driving Licences) (Large Goods and Passenger-Carrying Vehicles) (Amendment) Regulations 1996 S.I. 1996/212
- A30 Trunk Road (Great South West Road) (Temporary Restriction of Traffic) Order 1996 S.I. 1996/215
- A41 Trunk Road (Camden) Red Route Experimental Traffic Order 1996 S.I. 1996/216
- A205 Trunk Road (Richmond and Wandsworth) Red Route Experimental Traffic Order 1995 (Amendment No. 1) Order 1996 S.I. 1996/217
- Gas Act 1995 (Appointed Day and Commencement) Order 1996 (SI 1996/218)
- Gas Act 1995 (Transitional Provisions and Savings) (No. 1) Order 1996 (SI 1996/219)
- Police (Promotion) (Scotland) Regulations 1996 S.I. 1996/221
- Income Tax (Building Societies) (Dividends and Interest) (Amendment) Regulations 1996 S.I. 1996/223
- Farm and Conservation Grant (Variation) Scheme 1996 S.I. 1996/230
- Central Manchester Development Corporation(Planning Functions) Order 1996 S.I. 1996/232
- Central Manchester Development Corporation (Transfer of Property, Rights and Liabilities) Order 1996 S.I. 1996/233
- Environment Agency (Transfer Date) Order 1996 S.I. 1996/234
- Education (Grants for Education Support and Training: Nursery Education) (England) Regulations 1996 S.I. 1996/235
- Act of Sederunt (Fees of Solicitors in the Sheriff Court) (Amendment) 1996 S.I. 1996/236
- Act of Sederunt (Rules of the Court of Session Amendment No. 1) (Fees of Solicitors) 1996 S.I. 1996/237
- Act of Sederunt (Copyright, Designs and Patents) (Amendment) 1996 S.I. 1996/238
- Community Drivers' Hours (Passenger and Goods Vehicles) (Temporary Exception) Regulations 1996 S.I. 1996/239
- Drivers' Hours (Passenger and Goods Vehicles) (Exemption) Regulations 1996 S.I. 1996/240
- Child Support Commissioners (Procedure) (Amendment) Regulations 1996 S.I. 1996/243
- Carriage by Air (Sterling Equivalents) Order 1996 S.I. 1996/244
- Sea Fishing (Enforcement of Community Quota Measures) Order 1996 S.I. 1996/247
- Fishing Boats (European Economic Community) Designation (Variation) Order 1996 S.I. 1996/248
- Hinckley College (Dissolution) Order 1996 S.I. 1996/249
- National Health Service (Clinical Negligence Scheme) Regulations 1996 S.I. 1996/251
- Gas Act 1995 (Consequential Modifications of Subordinate Legislation) Order 1996 (SI 1996/252)
- Co-operation of Insolvency Courts (Designation of Relevant Countries) Order 1996 S.I. 1996/253
- Bridgend and District National Health Service Trust (Dissolution) Order 1996 S.I. 1996/255
- Glan Hafren National Health Service Trust (Dissolution) Order 1996 S.I. 1996/256
- Bridgend and District National Health Service Trust (Establishment) Order 1996 S.I. 1996/257
- Glan Hafren National Health Service Trust (Establishment) Order 1996 S.I. 1996/258
- North Glamorgan National Health Service Trust (Establishment) Order 1996 S.I. 1996/259
- Partnerships (Unrestricted Size) No. 11 Regulations 1996 S.I. 1996/262
- Charter Trustees Regulations 1996 (SI 1996/263)
- A316 Trunk Road (Richmond) (No. 2) Red Route Experimental Traffic Order 1996 S.I. 1996/264
- Local Government Act 1988 (Defined Activities) (Specified Periods) (Wales) Regulations 1996 S.I. 1996/265
- European Communities (Designation) Order 1996 S.I. 1996/266
- European Communities (Definition of Treaties) (Statute of the European Schools) Order 1996 S.I. 1996/267
- Bosnia and Herzegovina (High Representative)Order 1996 S.I. 1996/268
- Child Abduction and Custody (Parties to Conventions) (Amendment) Order 1996 S.I. 1996/269
- International Sea-Bed Authority (Immunities and Privileges) Order 1996 S.I. 1996/270
- Medical (Professional Performance) Act 1995 (Commencement No. 1) Order 1996 S.I. 1996/271
- International Tribunal for the Law of the Sea (Immunities and Privileges) Order 1996 S.I. 1996/272
- Transfer of Functions (Registration and Statistics) Order 1996 S.I. 1996/273
- Education (Northern Ireland) Order 1996 S.I. 1996/274
- Gas (Northern Ireland) Order 1996 S.I. 1996/275
- Crown Office (Forms and Proclamations Rules) (Amendment) Order 1996 S.I. 1996/276
- County Courts (Amendment) (Northern Ireland) Order 1996 S.I. 1996/277
- Criminal Justice Act 1988 (Designated Countries and Territories) (Amendment) Order 1996 S.I. 1996/278
- Extradition (Designated Commonwealth Countries) Order 1991 (Amendment) Order 1996 S.I. 1996/279
- Merchant Shipping (Categorisation of Registries of Overseas Territories) (Gibraltar) Order 1996 S.I. 1996/280
- Merchant Shipping (Gibraltar Colours) Order 1996 S.I. 1996/281
- Merchant Shipping (Prevention of Pollution) (Law of the Sea Convention) Order 1996 S.I. 1996/282
- Combined Probation Areas (Shropshire) Order 1996 S.I. 1996/283
- Combined Probation Areas (Gwent and Mid Glamorgan) Order 1996 S.I. 1996/284
- A1 Trunk Road (Barnet) (50 mph Speed Limit) Order 1996 S.I. 1996/285
- Fossil Fuel Levy (Scotland) Regulations 1996 S.I. 1996/293
- Mental Health (After-care under Supervision) Regulations 1996 S.I. 1996/294
- Mental Health (Patients in the Community) (Transfers from Scotland) Regulations 1996 S.I. 1996/295

== 301–400 ==
- Educational Endowments (Fife Region) Transfer Scheme Order 1996 S.I. 1996/306
- Educational Endowments (Highland Region) Transfer Scheme Order 1996 S.I. 1996/307
- Educational Endowments (Borders Region) Transfer Scheme Order 1996 S.I. 1996/308
- Local Government Reorganisation (Wales) (Council Tax Reduction Scheme) Regulations 1996 S.I. 1996/309
- Council Tax (Demand Notices) (Wales) (Amendment) Regulations 1996 S.I. 1996/310
- Non-Domestic Rating (Demand Notices) (Wales) (Amendment) Regulations 1996 S.I. 1996/311
- Local Government Changes for England (Property Transfer and Transitional Payments) (Amendment) Regulations 1996 S.I. 1996/312
- Transfer of Functions (Foreign Service Allowance) Order 1996 S.I. 1996/313
- Mental Health Review Tribunal (Amendment) Rules 1996 S.I. 1996/314
- Companies (Revision of Defective Accounts and Report) (Amendment) Regulations 1996 S.I. 1996/315
- Wireless Telegraphy (Cordless Telephone Apparatus) (Exemption) Regulations 1996 S.I. 1996/316
- Measuring Instruments (EEC Requirements) (Gas Volume Meters) (Amendment) Regulations 1996 S.I. 1996/319
- Local Government etc. (Scotland) Act 1994 (Commencement No. 7 and Savings) Order 1996 (SI 1996/323)
- West Glasgow Hospitals University National Health Service Trust (Establishment) Amendment Order 1996 S.I. 1996/324
- Water Services Charges (Billing and Collection) (Scotland) Order 1996 S.I. 1996/325
- Domestic Sewerage Charges (Reduction) (Scotland) Regulations 1996 S.I. 1996/326
- Local Government Changes for England (Miscellaneous Provision) Regulations 1996 S.I. 1996/330
- Local Government Changes for England (Council Tax) (Transitional Reduction) (Amendment) Regulations 1996 S.I. 1996/333
- Education (Grants for Education Support and Training) (Wales) Regulations 1996 S.I. 1996/334
- Local Government Reorganisation (Wales) (Calculation of Basic Amount of Council Tax) Order 1996 S.I. 1996/335
- Potato Marketing Scheme (Commencement of Revocation Period) Order 1996 S.I. 1996/336
- Agricultural Holdings (Fee) Regulations 1996 S.I. 1996/337
- Health and Safety (Safety Signs and Signals) Regulations 1996 (SI 1996/341)
- Local Authorities (Goods and Services) (Public Bodies) (Trunk Roads) Order 1996 S.I. 1996/342
- Welsh Church Act Funds (Designation and Specification) Order 1996 S.I. 1996/344
- Deregulation (Fair Trading Act 1973) (Amendment) (Merger Reference Time Limits) Order 1996 S.I. 1996/345
- Deregulation (Restrictive Trade Practices Act 1976) (Amendment) (Variation of Exempt Agreements) Order 1996 S.I. 1996/346
- Deregulation (Restrictive Trade Practices Act 1976) (Amendment) (Time Limits) Order 1996 S.I. 1996/347
- Restrictive Trade Practices (Non-notifiable Agreements) (Turnover Threshold) Order 1996 S.I. 1996/348
- Restrictive Trade Practices (Non-notifiable Agreements) (EC Block Exemptions) Order 1996 S.I. 1996/349
- National Health Service Trusts (Originating Capital Debt) Order 1996 S.I. 1996/350
- North Durham Acute Hospitals National Health Service Trust (Transfer of Trust Property) Order 1996 S.I. 1996/351
- Community Health Care: North Durham National Health Service Trust (Transfer of Trust Property) Order 1996 S.I. 1996/352
- Education (Grants for Nursery Education) (England) Regulations 1996 S.I. 1996/353
- Trunk Road (A4) (Great West Road, Hounslow) (Restriction of Traffic) Order 1984 (Variation) Order 1996 S.I. 1996/357
- Education (School Premises) Regulations 1996 S.I. 1996/360
- Gas Act 1995 (Consequential Modifications of Local Acts and Orders) Order 1996 (SI 1996/362)
- Redundancy Payments (Local Government) (Modification) (Amendment) Order 1996 S.I. 1996/372
- Animals, Meat and Meat Products (Examination for Residues and Maximum Residue Limits) (Amendment) Regulations 1996 S.I. 1996/374
- Human Fertilisation and Embryology (Statutory Storage Period for Embryos) Regulations 1996 S.I. 1996/375
- Bath and North East Somerset District Council (Staff Transfer) Order 1996 S.I. 1996/377
- East Riding of Yorkshire District Council (Staff Transfer) Order 1996 S.I. 1996/378
- Wireless Telegraphy (Television Licence Fees) (Amendment) Regulations 1996 S.I. 1996/379
- Coventry Healthcare National Health Service Trust (Transfer of Trust Property) Order 1996 S.I. 1996/380
- Education (School Financial Statements) (Prescribed Particulars etc.) (Amendment and Revocation) Regulations 1996 S.I. 1996/381
- Education (Individual Pupils' Achievements) (Information) (Wales) Regulations 1996 S.I. 1996/382
- South Tyneside Health Care National Health Service Trust (Transfer of Trust Property) Order 1996 S.I. 1996/383
- North Lincolnshire District Council (Staff Transfer) Order 1996 S.I. 1996/384
- Restrictive Trade Practices (Gas Conveyance and Storage) Order 1996 S.I. 1996/385
- North East Lincolnshire District Council (Staff Transfer) Order 1996 S.I. 1996/386
- South Gloucestershire District Council(Staff Transfer) Order 1996 S.I. 1996/387
- North Yorkshire (District of York) (Staff Transfer) Order 1996 S.I. 1996/388
- National Health Service (Dental Charges) Amendment Regulations 1996 S.I. 1996/389
- National Assistance (Sums for Personal Requirements) Regulations 1996 S.I. 1996/391
- National Health Service Trusts (Originating Capital Debt) (Scotland) Order 1996 S.I. 1996/392
- Education (Financial Delegation to Schools) (Mandatory Exceptions) (Revocation and Amendment) Regulations 1996 S.I. 1996/395
- Local Government (Wales) Act 1994 (Commencement No. 7) Order 1996 (SI 1996/396)
- Humberside (Staff Transfer) Order 1996 S.I. 1996/397
- Cleveland (Staff Transfer) Order 1996 S.I. 1996/398
- Gas Act 1995 (Transitional Provisions and Savings) (No. 2) Order 1996 (SI 1996/399)
- Avon (Staff Transfer) Order 1996 S.I. 1996/400

== 401–500 ==
- University College London Hospitals National Health Service Trust (Establishment) Order 1996 S.I. 1996/401
- North Lincolnshire & East Riding of Yorkshire District Councils (Staff Transfer) Order 1996 S.I. 1996/408
- Local Government Reorganisation (Wales) (Swansea Bay Port Health Authority) (Amendment) Order 1996 S.I. 1996/409
- National Health Service (Travelling Expenses and Remission of Charges) Amendment Regulations 1996 S.I. 1996/410
- Campbeltown (Ferry Terminal) Harbour Revision Order 1996 S.I. 1996/412
- Lyon Court and Office Fees (Variation) Order 1996 S.I. 1996/413
- Local Government Superannuation (Scotland) Amendment Regulations 1996 S.I. 1996/414
- Railways Act 1993 (Consequential Modifications) (No. 5) Order 1996 S.I. 1996/420
- Electricity and Pipe-line Works (Assessment of Environmental Effects) (Amendment) Regulations 1996 S.I. 1996/422
- East Glamorgan National Health Service Trust (Transfer of Trust Property) Order 1996 S.I. 1996/423
- Llandough Hospital and Community National Health Service Trust (Transfer of Trust Property) Order 1996 S.I. 1996/424
- Social Security (Industrial Injuries and Diseases) (Miscellaneous Amendments) Regulations 1996 S.I. 1996/425
- Noise Insulation (Railways and Other Guided Transport Systems) Regulations 1996 S.I. 1996/428
- National Health Service (Travelling Expenses and Remission of Charges) (Scotland) Amendment Regulations 1996 S.I. 1996/429
- Council Tax (Administration and Enforcement) (Scotland) Amendment Regulations 1996 S.I. 1996/430
- National Health Service (Appointment of Consultants) (Wales) Continuation and Transitional Provisions Order 1996 S.I. 1996/433
- Civil Legal Aid (Assessment of Resources) (Amendment) Regulations 1996 S.I. 1996/434
- Legal Advice and Assistance (Amendment) Regulations 1996 S.I. 1996/435
- Legal Aid in Criminal and Care Proceedings (General) (Amendment) Regulations 1996 S.I. 1996/436
- Veterinary Surgeons and Veterinary Practitioners (Registration) (Amendment) RegulationsOrder of Council 1996 S.I. 1996/437
- Sex Discrimination and Equal Pay (Miscellaneous Amendments) Regulations 1996 S.I. 1996/438
- Gas (Calculation of Thermal Energy) Regulations 1996 S.I. 1996/439
- Cardiff Petty Sessional Division (Consequences of Local Government Changes) Order 1996 S.I. 1996/440
- Vale of Glamorgan Petty Sessional Division (Consequences of Local Government Changes) Order 1996 S.I. 1996/441
- Welshpool Petty Sessional Division (Consequences of Local Government Changes) Order 1996 S.I. 1996/442
- A57 Trunk Road (Rotherham/Sheffield Boundary to Swallownest Roundabout) (Detrunking) Order 1996 S.I. 1996/443
- British Nationality (Fees) Regulations 1996 S.I. 1996/444
- Kent (Coroners' Districts) (Amendment) Order 1996 S.I. 1996/445
- Local Government Changes for England (Miscellaneous Provision) Order 1996 S.I. 1996/446
- Food Protection (Emergency Prohibitions) (Oil and Chemical Pollution of Fish and Plants) Order 1996 S.I. 1996/448
- Gas Act 1986 (Exemptions) (No. 1) Order 1996 (SI 1996/449)
- Gas Meters (Information on Connection and Disconnection) Regulations 1996 S.I. 1996/450
- Local Government Changes for England (Staff) (Amendment) Regulations 1996 S.I. 1996/455
- Local Government (Compensation for Redundancy) (Amendment) Regulations 1996 S.I. 1996/456
- Assured and Protected Tenancies (Lettings to Students) (Amendment) Regulations 1996 S.I. 1996/458
- Income-related Benefits Schemes (Miscellaneous Amendments) Regulations 1996 S.I. 1996/462
- Petty Sessional Divisions (West Glamorgan) Order 1996 S.I. 1996/463
- New Town (Cumbernauld) (Transfer of Property, Rights and Liabilities) Order 1996 S.I. 1996/464
- New Town (East Kilbride) (Transfer of Property, Rights and Liabilities) Order 1996 S.I. 1996/465
- New Town (Glenrothes) (Transfer of Property, Rights and Liabilities) Order 1996 S.I. 1996/466
- Lotteries (Gaming Board Fees) Order 1996 S.I. 1996/468
- Local Authorities (Members' Allowances) (Amendment) Regulations 1996 S.I. 1996/469
- Gas Act 1995 (Consequential Modifications of Subordinate Legislation) (No. 2) Order 1996 (SI 1996/470)
- Gas Act 1986 (Exemptions) (No. 2) Order 1996 (SI 1996/471)
- National Health Service (Dental Charges) (Scotland) Amendment Regulations 1996 S.I. 1996/472
- National Health Service (Optical Charges and Payments) (Scotland) Amendment Regulations 1996 S.I. 1996/473
- Educational Endowments (Dumfries and Galloway Region) Transfer Scheme Order 1996 S.I. 1996/474
- Educational Endowments (Central Region) Transfer Scheme Order 1996 S.I. 1996/475
- Gas (Applications for Licences and Extensions and Restrictions of Licences) Regulations 1996 S.I. 1996/476
- Educational Endowments (Tayside Region) Transfer Scheme Order 1996 S.I. 1996/477
- Educational Endowments (Grampian Region) Transfer Scheme Order 1996 S.I. 1996/478
- Child Support (Maintenance Assessments and Special Cases) and Social Security (Claims and Payments) Amendment Regulations 1996 S.I. 1996/481
- Medicines (Homoeopathic Medicinal Products for Human Use) Amendment Regulations 1996 S.I. 1996/482
- Social Security (Incapacity for Work) (General) Amendment Regulations 1996 S.I. 1996/484
- Guaranteed Minimum Pensions Increase Order 1996 S.I. 1996/485
- Social Security (Contributions) Amendment Regulations 1996 S.I. 1996/486
- Offshore Safety Act 1992 (Commencement No. 2) Order 1996 (SI 1996/487)
- Authorities for the Ashworth, Broadmoor and Rampton Hospitals (Establishment and Constitution) Order 1996 S.I. 1996/488
- Ashworth, Broadmoor and Rampton Hospital Authorities (Functions and Membership) Regulations 1996 S.I. 1996/489
- Special Hospitals Service Authority (Abolition) Order 1996 S.I. 1996/490
- Gas (Street Works) (Compensation of Small Businesses) Regulations 1996 S.I. 1996/491
- Local Government (Transfer of Children's Hearings Cases) (Scotland) Order 1996 S.I. 1996/492
- Cardiff (St. Mellons Community) Order 1996 S.I. 1996/494
- Health Authorities (Wales) (Transfer of Trust Property) Order 1996 S.I. 1996/495
- Roads (Transitional Powers) (Scotland) Amendment Order 1996 S.I. 1996/496
- Food (Preparation and Distribution of Meat) (Scotland) Revocation Regulations 1996 S.I. 1996/497
- Financial Services Act 1986 (Gas Industry Exemption) Order 1996 S.I. 1996/498
- Safety of Sports Grounds (Accommodation of Spectators) Order 1996 S.I. 1996/499
- Road Traffic Act 1991 (Amendment of Schedule 3) (England and Wales) Order 1996 S.I. 1996/500

== 501–600 ==
- Local Government Reorganisation (Wales) (Staff) Order 1996 S.I. 1996/501
- Personal Injuries (Civilians) Amendment Scheme 1996 S.I. 1996/502
- Salford Community Health Care National Health Service Trust (Transfer of Trust Property) Order 1996 S.I. 1996/503
- Council Tax and Non-Domestic Rating (Demand Notices) (England) Amendment Regulations 1996 S.I. 1996/504
- Financial Assistance for Environmental Purposes Order 1996 S.I. 1996/505
- Environmental Protection (Controls on Substances that Deplete the Ozone Layer) Regulations 1996 S.I. 1996/506
- Leicestershire (City of Leicester and District of Rutland) (Structural Change) Order 1996 S.I. 1996/507
- Environmental Licences (Suspension and Revocation) Regulations 1996 S.I. 1996/508
- Statute Law (Repeals) Act 1993 (Commencement) Order 1996 (SI 1996/509)
- Mental Health Review Tribunals (Regions) Order 1996 S.I. 1996/510
- Authorities for London Post-Graduate Teaching Hospitals (Abolition) Order 1996 S.I. 1996/511
- Authorities for London Post-Graduate Teaching Hospitals (Revocation) Regulations 1996 S.I. 1996/512
- Act of Adjournal (Criminal Procedure Rules) 1996 S.I. 1996/513
- Court of Session etc. Fees Amendment Order 1996 S.I. 1996/514
- Qualifications of Chief Social Work Officers (Scotland) Regulations 1996 S.I. 1996/515
- High Court of Justiciary Fees Amendment Order 1996 S.I. 1996/516
- Criminal Justice (Scotland) Act 1995 (Commencement No. 2, Transitional Provisions and Savings) Order 1996 S.I. 1996/517
- Lands Tribunal for Scotland (Amendment) (Fees) Rules 1996 S.I. 1996/519
- West Wales Ambulance National Health Service Trust (Transfer of Trust Property) Order 1996 S.I. 1996/522
- West Wales Ambulance National Health Service Trust (Transfer of Trust Property) (No. 2) Order 1996 S.I. 1996/523
- Gwent Community Health National Health Service Trust (Transfer of Trust Property) Order 1996 S.I. 1996/524
- Local Government Reorganisation (Wales) (Consequential Amendments) Order 1996 S.I. 1996/525
- Cardiff Community Healthcare National Health Service Trust (Transfer of Trust Property) Order 1996 S.I. 1996/526
- Velindre Hospital National Health Service Trust (Transfer of Trust Property) Order 1996 S.I. 1996/527
- Rural Development Grants (Agriculture) (Wales) Regulations 1996 S.I. 1996/529
- University Hospital of Wales Healthcare National Health Service Trust (Transfer of Trust Property) Order 1996 S.I. 1996/530
- Rhondda Health Care National Health Service Trust (Transfer of Trust Property) Order 1996 S.I. 1996/531
- Local Government Reorganisation (Wales) (Property etc.) Order 1996 S.I. 1996/532
- Local Government Reorganisation (Wales) (Rent Officers) Order 1996 S.I. 1996/533
- National Park Authorities (Wales) (Amendment) Order 1996 S.I. 1996/534
- Development Board for Rural Wales (Area) Order 1996 S.I. 1996/535
- Motor Vehicles (Driving Licences) (Amendment) (No. 2) Regulations 1996 S.I. 1996/536
- Education (Grant-maintained and Grant-maintained Special Schools) (Finance) (Wales) Regulations 1996 S.I. 1996/537
- Regional Flood Defence Committee (Welsh Region) Order 1996 S.I. 1996/538
- Royal Liverpool Children's Hospital and Community Services National Health Service Trust (Change of Name) Order 1996 S.I. 1996/539
- Mental Health (Hospital, Guardianship and Consent to Treatment) (Amendment) Regulations 1996 S.I. 1996/540
- Value Added Tax (Annual Accounting) Regulations 1996 S.I. 1996/542
- Norfolk and Suffolk Broads (Extension of Byelaws) Order 1996 S.I. 1996/545
- Insurance (Fees) Regulations 1996 S.I. 1996/546
- Local Government Changes for England (Housing Benefit and Council Tax Benefit) Amendment Regulations 1996 S.I. 1996/547
- Local Government Changes for Scotland (Housing Benefit and Council Tax Benefit) Order 1996 S.I. 1996/548
- Local Government Reorganisation (Wales) (Housing Benefit and Council Tax Benefit) Order 1996 S.I. 1996/549
- Gas Safety (Installation and Use) (Amendment) Regulations 1996 S.I. 1996/550
- Gas Safety (Management) Regulations 1996 S.I. 1996/551
- National Health Service (Amendment) Act 1995 (Commencement No. 3) Order 1996 S.I. 1996/552
- London Residuary Body (Winding Up) Order 1996 S.I. 1996/557
- Non-Domestic Rating Contributions (England) (Amendment) Regulations 1996 S.I. 1996/561
- Local Government Changes for England (Finance) (Amendment) Regulations 1996 S.I. 1996/563
- Local Authorities (Capital Finance and Approved Investments) (Amendment) Regulations 1996 S.I. 1996/568
- Financial Assistance For Industry (Increase of Limit) Order 1996 S.I. 1996/569
- Royal West Sussex National Health Service Trust (Transfer of Trust Property) Order 1996 S.I. 1996/570
- Chichester Priority Care Services National Health Service Trust (Transfer of Trust Property) Order 1996 S.I. 1996/571
- Marriage Fees (Scotland) Regulations 1996 S.I. 1996/572
- Injuries in War (Shore Employments) Compensation (Amendment) Scheme 1996 S.I. 1996/573
- Registration of Births, Deaths, Marriages and Divorces (Fees) (Scotland) Amendment Regulations 1996 S.I. 1996/574
- Public Record Office (Fees) Regulations 1996 S.I. 1996/575
- Petty Sessions Areas (Divisions and Names) (Amendment) Regulations 1996 S.I. 1996/576
- Youth Courts (Constitution) (Amendment) Rules 1996 S.I. 1996/577
- Local Authorities (Property Transfer) (Scotland) Amendment Order 1996 S.I. 1996/578
- Scottish Examination Board (Amendment) Regulations 1996 S.I. 1996/579
- Rating, Valuation and Council Tax (Miscellaneous Provisions) (Scotland) Order 1996 S.I. 1996/580
- Local Authorities (Capital Finance) (Rate of Discount for 1996/97) Regulations 1996 S.I. 1996/581
- National Health Service (Optical Charges and Payments) Amendment Regulations 1996 S.I. 1996/582
- National Health Service (Charges for Drugs and Appliances) Amendment Regulations 1996 S.I. 1996/583
- Education (Inner London Education Authority) (Property Transfer) (Modification) Order 1996 S.I. 1996/584
- Local Government (Publication of Information about Unused and Underused Land) (England) (Revocation) Regulations 1996 S.I. 1996/585
- Contracting Out (Management Functions in relation to certain Community Homes) Order 1996 S.I. 1996/586
- Home Energy Efficiency Grants (Amendment) Regulations 1996 S.I. 1996/587
- Civil Courts (Amendment) (No. 2) Order 1996 S.I. 1996/588
- A1 Trunk Road (Islington) (Bus Lanes) Red Route Experimental 1996 S.I. 1996/589
- Accounts and Audit Regulations 1996 S.I. 1996/590
- A1 Trunk Road (Haringey) (Bus Lanes) Red Route Experimental 1996 S.I. 1996/591
- Housing Associations (Permissible Additional Purposes) (England and Wales) Order 1996 S.I. 1996/592
- Environment Act 1995 (Consequential Amendments) Regulations 1996 S.I. 1996/593
- Companies (Forms) (Amendment) Regulations 1996 S.I. 1996/594
- Rheoliadau (Ffurflenni a Dogfenni Cymraeg) Cwmnïau 1996 S.I. 1996/595
- Companies (Welsh Language Forms and Documents) Regulations 1996 S.I. 1996/595
- Misuse of Drugs (Licence Fees) (Amendment) Regulations 1996 S.I. 1996/596
- Social Security (Contributions) (Re-rating and National Insurance Fund Payments) Order 1996 S.I. 1996/597
- Workmen's Compensation (Supplementation) (Amendment) Scheme 1996 S.I. 1996/598
- Social Security Benefits Up-rating Order 1996 S.I. 1996/599
- Energy Information (Washing Machines) Regulations 1996 S.I. 1996/600

== 601–700 ==
- Energy Information (Tumble Driers) Regulations 1996 S.I. 1996/601
- National Assistance (Assessment of Resources) (Amendment) Regulations 1996 S.I. 1996/602
- Public Airport Companies (Capital Finance) Order 1996 S.I. 1996/604
- Income Support (General) Amendment Regulations 1996 S.I. 1996/606
- Superannuation (Admission to Schedule 1 of the Superannuation Act 1972) Order 1996 S.I. 1996/608
- Building Societies (General Charge and Fees) Regulations 1996 S.I. 1996/609
- Charter Trustees (Amendment) Regulations 1996 (SI 1996/610)
- Local Government Changes for England (Amendment) Regulations 1996 S.I. 1996/611
- Industrial and Provident Societies (Credit Unions) (Amendment of Fees) Regulations 1996 S.I. 1996/612
- Industrial and Provident Societies (Amendment of Fees) Regulations 1996 S.I. 1996/613
- Friendly Societies (General Charge and Fees) Regulations 1996 S.I. 1996/614
- Education (Areas to which Pupils and Students Belong) Regulations 1996 S.I. 1996/615
- Intermediate Diets (Scotland) Order 1996 S.I. 1996/616
- Criminal Justice (Scotland) Act 1987 Fixed Penalty Order 1996 S.I. 1996/617
- Local Government Reorganisation (Wales) (Committees for Sea Fisheries Districts) (Amendment) Order 1996 S.I. 1996/618
- Local Government Reorganisation (Wales) (Finance) (Miscellaneous Amendments and Transitional Provisions) Order 1996 S.I. 1996/619
- Central Rating Lists (Amendment) Regulations 1996 S.I. 1996/620
- Local Authorities (Companies) (Amendment) Order 1996 S.I. 1996/621
- Medical Devices (Consultation Requirements) (Fees) Amendment Regulations 1996 S.I. 1996/622
- National Health Service Contracts (Dispute Resolution) Regulations 1996 S.I. 1996/623
- Health Authorities (England) Establishment Order 1996 S.I. 1996/624
- Criminal Justice and Public Order Act 1994 (Commencement No. 9) Order 1996 (SI 1996/625)
- Jurors (Scotland) Act 1825 (Provision of Information) Order 1996 S.I. 1996/626
- Criminal Legal Aid (Scotland) Amendment Regulations 1996 S.I. 1996/627
- Sheriff Court Fees Amendment Order 1996 S.I. 1996/628
- Educational Endowments (Strathclyde Region) Transfer Scheme Order 1996 S.I. 1996/629
- Educational Endowments (Lothian Region) Transfer Scheme Order 1996 S.I. 1996/630
- Council Tax (Amendment of Housing (Scotland) Act 1987) (Scotland) Regulations 1996 S.I. 1996/631
- Housing (Forms) (Scotland) Amendment Regulations 1996 S.I. 1996/632
- Local Government Reorganisation (Wales) (Capital Finance) Order 1996 S.I. 1996/633
- Waste Management Regulations 1996 S.I. 1996/634
- Child Support Departure Direction (Anticipatory Application) Regulations 1996 S.I. 1996/635
- Council Tax (Discount Disregards) Amendment Order 1996 S.I. 1996/636
- Council Tax (Additional Provisions for Discount Disregards) Amendment Regulations 1996 S.I. 1996/637
- Employment Protection (National Health Service) Order 1996 S.I. 1996/638
- Railway Industry (Employees' Transport Vouchers) (Taxation) Order 1996 S.I. 1996/639
- Community Health Councils Regulations 1996 S.I. 1996/640
- Legal Advice and Assistance (Amendment) (No. 2) Regulations 1996 S.I. 1996/641
- Civil Legal Aid (Assessment of Resources) (Amendment) (No. 2) Regulations 1996 S.I. 1996/642
- Legal Aid in Contempt Proceedings (Remuneration) (Amendment) Regulations 1996 S.I. 1996/643
- Legal Aid in Criminal and Care Proceedings (Costs) (Amendment) Regulations 1996 S.I. 1996/644
- Legal Aid in Civil Proceedings (Remuneration) (Amendment) Regulations 1996 S.I. 1996/645
- Legal Aid in Criminal and Care Proceedings (General) (Amendment) (No. 2) Regulations 1996 S.I. 1996/646
- Legal Advice and Assistance (Duty Solicitor) (Remuneration) (Amendment) Regulations 1996 S.I. 1996/647
- Legal Advice and Assistance at Police Stations (Remuneration) (Amendment) Regulations 1996 S.I. 1996/648
- Civil Legal Aid (General) (Amendment) Regulations 1996 S.I. 1996/649
- Legal Aid in Family Proceedings (Remuneration) (Amendment) Regulations 1996 S.I. 1996/650
- Certification Officer (Amendment of Fees) Regulations 1996 S.I. 1996/651
- National Health Service Trusts (Consultation on Establishment and Dissolution) Regulations 1996 S.I. 1996/653
- National Health Service (Functions of Health Authorities in London) Regulations 1996 S.I. 1996/654
- Local Government Reorganisation (Amendment of Coroners Act 1988) Regulations 1996 S.I. 1996/655
- Avon (Coroners) Order 1996 S.I. 1996/656
- Cleveland (Coroners) Order 1996 S.I. 1996/657
- Humberside (Coroners) Order 1996 S.I. 1996/658
- York and North Yorkshire (Coroners) Order 1996 S.I. 1996/659
- Local Government Reorganisation (Compensation for Loss of Remuneration) (Amendment) Regulations 1996 S.I. 1996/660
- Coroners' Districts (Wales) Order 1996 S.I. 1996/661
- Coroners' Districts (Designation of Relevant Councils) (Wales) Order 1996 S.I. 1996/662
- Social Security (Contributions) Amendment (No. 2) Regulations 1996 S.I. 1996/663
- Railways Act 1993 (Extinguishment of Relevant Loans) (Railtrack plc) Order 1996 S.I. 1996/664
- Nuclear Generating Stations (Security) Regulations 1996 S.I. 1996/665
- Regional Health Authorities (Transfer of Trust Property) Order 1996 S.I. 1996/666
- Environmental Protection (Applications, Appeals and Registers) (Amendment) Regulations 1996 S.I. 1996/667
- Statutory Maternity Pay (Compensation of Employers) Amendment Regulations 1996 S.I. 1996/668
- National Health Service (Functions of Health Authorities) (Complaints) Regulations 1996 S.I. 1996/669
- Social Security Benefits Up-rating Regulations 1996 S.I. 1996/670
- Social Security (Industrial Injuries) (Dependency) (Permitted Earnings Limits) Order 1996 S.I. 1996/671
- Social Security (Claims and Payments Etc.) Amendment Regulations 1996 S.I. 1996/672
- Exchange Gains and Losses (Insurance Companies) (Amendment) Regulations 1996 S.I. 1996/673
- Local Government Changes for England (Magistrates' Courts) Regulations 1996 S.I. 1996/674
- Magistrates' Courts (Wales) (Consequences of Local Government Changes) Order 1996 S.I. 1996/675
- Commission Areas (Gwent, Mid Glamorgan and South Glamorgan) Order 1996 S.I. 1996/676
- Housing Benefit (Permitted Totals) Order 1996 S.I. 1996/677
- Council Tax Benefit (Permitted Totals) Order 1996 S.I. 1996/678
- Sugar Beet (Research and Education) Order 1996 S.I. 1996/679
- Scottish Land Court (Fees) Order 1996 S.I. 1996/680
- Accounts Commission (Scotland) Regulations 1996 S.I. 1996/681
- Local Government (Transitional Financial Provisions) (Scotland) Order 1996 S.I. 1996/682
- Medicines (Products for Human Use—Fees) Amendment Regulations 1996 S.I. 1996/683
- National Health Service (Existing Liabilities Scheme) Regulations 1996 S.I. 1996/686
- Civil Aviation (Canadian Navigation Services) Regulations 1996 S.I. 1996/688
- Civil Aviation (Navigation Services Charges) (Amendment) Regulations 1996 S.I. 1996/689
- Measuring Instruments (EEC Requirements) (Fees) (Amendment) Regulations 1996 S.I. 1996/690
- Local Government Changes for England (Finance—Social Services Grants) Regulations 1996 S.I. 1996/691
- Children (Homes and Secure Accommodation) (Miscellaneous Amendments) Regulations 1996 S.I. 1996/692
- Isles of Scilly (Carers) Order 1996 S.I. 1996/693
- Plastic Materials and Articles in Contact with Food (Amendment) Regulations 1996 S.I. 1996/694
- Countryside Stewardship Regulations 1996 S.I. 1996/695
- Common Agricultural Policy (Wine) Regulations 1996 S.I. 1996/696
- Diseases of Animals (Approved Disinfectants) (Amendment) Order 1996 S.I. 1996/697
- National Health Service (Pharmaceutical Services) Amendment Regulations 1996 S.I. 1996/698
- Police (Amendment) Regulations 1996 S.I. 1996/699
- Social Security (Contributions) Amendment (No. 3) Regulations 1996 S.I. 1996/700

== 701–800 ==
- National Health Service (Appointment of Consultants) Regulations 1996 S.I. 1996/701
- National Health Service (General Medical Services) Amendment Regulations 1996 S.I. 1996/702
- National Health Service (Service Committees and Tribunal) Amendment Regulations 1996 S.I. 1996/703
- National Health Service (General Dental Services) Amendment Regulations 1996 S.I. 1996/704
- National Health Service (General Ophthalmic Services) Amendment Regulations 1996 S.I. 1996/705
- National Health Service (Fund-holding Practices) Regulations 1996 S.I. 1996/706
- Health Authorities (Membership and Procedure) Regulations 1996 S.I. 1996/707
- National Health Service (Functions of Health Authorities and Administration Arrangements) Regulations 1996 S.I. 1996/708
- Health Authorities Act 1995 (Transitional Provisions) Order 1996 (SI 1996/709)
- Local Government Changes for England (Education) (Miscellaneous Provisions) Regulations 1996 S.I. 1996/710
- Local Government Pension Scheme (Environment Agency) Regulations 1996 S.I. 1996/711
- Council Tax (Deductions from Income Support) Regulations 1993 Amendment Order 1996 (SI 1996/712)
- Cambridge Water Company (Constitution and Regulation) Order 1996 (SI 1996/713)
- Trade Marks (International Registration) Order 1996 (SI 1996/714)
- Trade Marks (International Registration) (Fees) Rules 1996 S.I. 1996/715
- United Nations (International Tribunal) (Former Yugoslavia) Order 1996 S.I. 1996/716
- Health Service Commissioner for England (Authorities for the Ashworth, Broadmoor and Rampton Hospitals) Order 1996 S.I. 1996/717
- Air Force Act 1955 (Bailiwick of Guernsey) Order 1996 S.I. 1996/718
- Air Force Act 1955 (Isle of Man) Order 1996 S.I. 1996/719
- Air Force Act 1955 (Jersey) Order 1996 S.I. 1996/720
- Appropriation (Northern Ireland) Order 1996 S.I. 1996/721
- Army Act 1955 (Bailiwick of Guernsey) Order 1996 S.I. 1996/722
- Army Act 1955 (Isle of Man) Order 1996 S.I. 1996/723
- Army Act 1955 (Jersey) Order 1996 S.I. 1996/724
- Business Tenancies (Northern Ireland) Order 1996 S.I. 1996/725
- Naval Discipline Act 1957 (Bailiwick of Guernsey) Order 1996 S.I. 1996/726
- Naval Discipline Act 1957 (Isle of Man) Order 1996 S.I. 1996/727
- Naval Discipline Act 1957 (Jersey) Order 1996 S.I. 1996/728
- Trade Marks Act 1994 (Isle of Man) Order 1996 S.I. 1996/729
- Double Taxation Relief (Taxes on Estates of Deceased Persons and Inheritances and on Gifts) (Netherlands) Order 1996 S.I. 1996/730
- Lord-Lieutenants (Scotland) Order 1996 S.I. 1996/731
- Naval, Military and Air Forces etc. (Disablement and Death) Service Pensions Amendment Order 1996 S.I. 1996/732
- Local Authorities (Armorial Bearings) (Wales) Order 1996 S.I. 1996/733
- Education (Grants for Education Support and Training) (England) Regulations 1996 S.I. 1996/734
- Richmond Adult and Community College (Incorporation) Order 1996 S.I. 1996/735
- Richmond Adult and Community College (Government) Regulations 1996 S.I. 1996/736
- Wiltshire Health Care National Health Service Trust (Transfer of Trust Property) Order 1996 S.I. 1996/737
- Environmentally Sensitive Areas (Breadalbane) Designation (Amendment) Order 1996 S.I. 1996/738
- Local Government (Transitional and Consequential Provisions and Revocations) (Scotland) Order 1996 S.I. 1996/739
- National Health Service (Charges for Drugs and Appliances) (Scotland) Amendment Regulations 1996 S.I. 1996/740
- Housing (Valuation Bands for Improvement and Repairs Grants) (Scotland) Order 1996 S.I. 1996/741
- Mental Health (Patients in the Community) (Transfer from England and Wales to Scotland) Regulations 1996 S.I. 1996/742
- Mental Health (Prescribed Forms) (Scotland) Regulations 1996 S.I. 1996/743
- Water and Sewerage Authorities (Rate of Return) (Scotland) Order 1996 S.I. 1996/744
- Common Police Services (Scotland) Order 1996 S.I. 1996/745
- Council Tax (Reduction of Liability) (Scotland) Regulations 1996 S.I. 1996/746
- Local Authorities (Discretionary Expenditure) (Scotland) Regulations 1996 S.I. 1996/747
- National Health Service (Fund-Holding Practices) (Scotland) Amendment Regulations 1996 S.I. 1996/748
- Forth and Tay Road Bridge Order Confirmation Acts (Modification) Order 1996 S.I. 1996/749
- Land Registry Trading Fund (Additional Assets) Order 1996 S.I. 1996/750
- Plant Health (Forestry) (Great Britain) (Amendment) Order 1996 S.I. 1996/751
- Gas (Extent of Domestic Supply Licences) Order 1996 S.I. 1996/752
- European Parliamentary Elections (Returning Officers) (Scotland) Order 1996 S.I. 1996/753
- Act of Sederunt (Rules of the Court of Session Amendment No. 2) (Fees of Shorthand Writers) 1996 S.I. 1996/754
- Local Government Finance (Scotland) Order 1996 S.I. 1996/755
- Revenue Support Grant (Scotland) Order 1996 S.I. 1996/756
- Education (Grants) (Purcell School) Regulations 1996 S.I. 1996/757
- Act of Sederunt (Fees of Shorthand Writers in the Sheriff Court) (Amendment) 1996 S.I. 1996/767
- Medicines (Medicated Animal Feeding Stuffs) (Amendment) Regulations 1996 S.I. 1996/769
- Local Government Act 1988 (Defined Activities) (Exemptions) (England and Wales) Order 1996 S.I. 1996/770
- Adventure Activities (Licensing) (Designation) Order 1996 S.I. 1996/771
- Adventure Activities Licensing Regulations 1996 S.I. 1996/772
- Hydrographic Office Trading Fund Order 1996 S.I. 1996/773
- Meteorological Office Trading Fund Order 1996 S.I. 1996/774
- Occupational Pension Schemes (Discharge of Protected Rights on Winding Up) Regulations 1996 S.I. 1996/775
- Personal and Occupational Pension Schemes (Miscellaneous Amendments) Regulations 1996 S.I. 1996/776
- Social Security Contributions, Statutory Maternity Pay and Statutory Sick Pay (Miscellaneous Amendments) Regulations 1996 S.I. 1996/777
- Pensions Act 1995 (Commencement No. 3) Order 1996 S.I. 1996/778
- Inter-American Development Bank (Eighth General Increase) Order 1995 S.I. 1996/779
- Police Grant (Scotland) Order 1996 S.I. 1996/780
- Lloyd's Underwriters (Tax) (Amendment) Regulations 1996 S.I. 1996/781
- Lloyd's Underwriters (Tax) (1992–93 to 1996–97) (Amendment) Regulations 1996 S.I. 1996/782
- Double Taxation Relief (Taxes on Income) (General) (Amendment) Regulations 1996 S.I. 1996/783
- Local Government (Direct Labour Organisations) (Accounts) (Scotland) Regulations 1996 S.I. 1996/784
- Children Act 1989 (Amendment) (Children's Services Planning) Order 1996 S.I. 1996/785
- Humberside (Coroners) (Amendment) Order 1996 S.I. 1996/787
- Weighing Equipment (Filling and Discontinuous Totalising Automatic Weighing Machines) (Amendment) Regulations 1996 S.I. 1996/797
- Pensions Increase (Review) Order 1996 S.I. 1996/800

== 801–900 ==
- National Savings Bank (Amendment) Regulations 1996 S.I. 1996/801
- A21 Trunk Road (Tonbridge Bypass to Pembury Bypass Dualling) Order 1996 S.I. 1996/802
- Income Tax (Employments) (Amendment) Regulations 1996 S.I. 1996/804
- Personal Pension Schemes (Deferred Annuity Purchase) (Acceptance of Contributions) Regulations 1996 S.I. 1996/805
- A21 Trunk Road (Tonbridge Bypass To Pembury Bypass Dualling Slip Roads) Order 1996 S.I. 1996/807
- A21 Trunk Road (Tonbridge Bypass to Pembury Bypass Dualling) (Detrunking) Order 1996 S.I. 1996/808
- Advice and Assistance (Scotland) Amendment Regulations 1996 S.I. 1996/811
- Civil Legal Aid (Scotland) Amendment Regulations 1996 S.I. 1996/812
- Housing Support Grant (Scotland) Order 1996 S.I. 1996/813
- Housing Support Grant (Scotland) Variation Order 1996 S.I. 1996/814
- A41 Trunk Road (Barnet) Red Route (Clearway) (No. 1) Traffic Order 1996 S.I. 1996/815
- Family Proceedings (Amendment) Rules 1996 S.I. 1996/816
- A41 Trunk Road (Barnet) Red Route (Clearway) (No. 2) Traffic Order 1996 S.I. 1996/817
- A41 Trunk Road (Barnet) Red Route (Clearway) (No. 3) Traffic Order 1996 S.I. 1996/818
- A1 Trunk Road (Barnet) Red Route (Clearway) Traffic Order 1996 S.I. 1996/819
- A406 Trunk Road (Barnet) Red Route (Clearway) Traffic Order 1996 S.I. 1996/820
- A406 Trunk Road (Barnet) Red Route Experimental Traffic Order 1996 S.I. 1996/821
- A501 Trunk Road (Marylebone Road, Westminster) (Temporary Prohibition of Traffic) Order 1996 S.I. 1996/822
- Local Government Act 1988 (Defined Activities) (Specified Period) (Redbridge London Borough Council) Regulations 1996 S.I. 1996/823
- Northumbrian and North East Water (Amendment of Local Enactments Etc.) Order 1996 S.I. 1996/824
- Pipelines Safety Regulations 1996 S.I. 1996/825
- Diseases of Animals (Waste Food) (Amendment) Order 1996 S.I. 1996/826
- Animal By-Products (Amendment) Order 1996 S.I. 1996/827
- Solent Oyster Fishery (Variation) (Clams) Order 1996 S.I. 1996/828
- Income Tax (Charge to Tax) (Payments out of Surplus Funds) (Relevant Rate) Order 1996 S.I. 1996/830
- National Health Service (Pharmaceutical Services) (Scotland) Amendment Regulations 1996 S.I. 1996/840
- National Health Service (General Dental Services) (Scotland) Amendment Regulations 1996 S.I. 1996/841
- National Health Service (General Medical Services) (Scotland) Amendment Regulations 1996 S.I. 1996/842
- National Health Service (General Ophthalmic Services) (Scotland) Amendment Regulations 1996 S.I. 1996/843
- Tax-exempt Special Savings Account (Amendment) Regulations 1996 S.I. 1996/844
- Trustee Investments (Division of Trust Fund) Order 1996 S.I. 1996/845
- Personal Equity Plan (Amendment) Regulations 1996 S.I. 1996/846
- Sussex Sea Fisheries District (Variation) Order 1996 S.I. 1996/847
- Deregulation (Corn Returns Act 1882) Order 1996 S.I. 1996/848
- Offshore Installations (Safety Zones) (No. 2) Order 1996 S.I. 1996/850
- Central Manchester Development Corporation (Area and Constitution) Order 1996 S.I. 1996/851
- A2 Trunk Road (West of Rochester) Detrunking Order 1996 S.I. 1996/853
- M2 Motorway (West of Rochester Section) Scheme 1996 S.I. 1996/854
- Food Protection (Emergency Prohibitions) (Oil and Chemical Pollution of Salmon and Migratory Trout) Order 1996 S.I. 1996/856
- Local Government Act 1988 (Personnel Services) (Exemption) (England and Wales) Order 1996 S.I. 1996/857
- Contracting Out (Functions in relation to the provision of Guardians Ad Litem and Reporting Officers Panels) Order 1996 S.I. 1996/858
- Police Pensions (Amendment) Regulations 1996 S.I. 1996/867
- Royal Free Hampstead National Health Service Trust (Amendment) Order 1996 S.I. 1996/871
- Lincoln Hospitals National Health Service Trust (Change of Name) Order 1996 S.I. 1996/872
- Hartlepool and East Durham National Health Service Trust (Establishment) Order 1996 S.I. 1996/873
- Worcestershire Community Healthcare National Health Service Trust (Establishment) Order 1996 S.I. 1996/874
- South Durham National Health Service Trust (Establishment) Order 1996 S.I. 1996/875
- South West Durham Mental Health National Health Service Trust Dissolution Order 1996 S.I. 1996/876
- Louth and District Healthcare National Health Service Trust Dissolution Order 1996 S.I. 1996/877
- Secretary of State's Trunk Road Functions (Contracting Out) (Scotland) Order 1996 S.I. 1996/878
- Hartlepool and Peterlee Hospitals National Health Service Trust Dissolution Order 1996 S.I. 1996/879
- South Durham Health Care National Health Service Trust Dissolution Order 1996 S.I. 1996/880
- University College London Hospitals National Health Service Trust Dissolution Order 1996 S.I. 1996/881
- Birmingham Heartlands Hospital National Health Service Trust Dissolution Order 1996 S.I. 1996/882
- Birmingham Heartlands and Solihull (Teaching) National Health Service Trust (Establishment) Order 1996 S.I. 1996/883
- South Worcestershire Community National Health Service Trust Dissolution Order 1996 S.I. 1996/884
- North East Worcestershire Community Health Care National Health Service Trust Dissolution Order 1996 S.I. 1996/885
- Royal National Throat, Nose and Ear Hospital National Health Service Trust Dissolution Order 1996 S.I. 1996/886
- Hartlepool Community Care National Health Service Trust Dissolution Order 1996 S.I. 1996/887
- Protection of Water Against Agricultural Nitrate Pollution (England and Wales) Regulations 1996 S.I. 1996/888
- Education (Grant-maintained and Grant-maintained Special Schools) (Finance) Regulations 1996 S.I. 1996/889
- Marking of Plastic Explosives for Detection Regulations 1996 S.I. 1996/890
- Prevention of Terrorism (Temporary Provisions) Act 1989 (Continuance) Order 1996 S.I. 1996/891
- Prevention of Terrorism (Exclusion Orders) Regulations 1996 S.I. 1996/892
- Returning Officers (Parliamentary Constituencies) (Wales) Order 1996 S.I. 1996/897
- Returning Officers (Parliamentary Constituencies) (England) (Amendment) Order 1996 S.I. 1996/898

== 901–1000 ==
- A41 Trunk Road (Gloucester Place, Westminster) (Temporary Prohibition of Traffic) Order 1996 S.I. 1996/903
- Broadcasting (Prescribed Countries) Order 1996 S.I. 1996/904
- Local Government Reorganisation (Wales) (Staff) (No. 2) Order 1996 S.I. 1996/905
- Local Government Reorganisation (Wales) (Property etc.) (Amendment) Order 1996 S.I. 1996/906
- East Surrey and Sutton District Water (Amendment of Local Enactments Etc.) Order 1996 S.I. 1996/907
- Farm Waste Grant (Nitrate Vulnerable Zones) (England and Wales) Scheme 1996 S.I. 1996/908
- Income Support (General) Amendment (No. 2) Regulations 1996 S.I. 1996/909
- Local Government Reorganisation (Wales) (Capital Finance and Miscellaneous Provisions) Order 1996 S.I. 1996/910
- Non-Domestic Rating (Chargeable Amounts) (Amendment) Regulations 1996 S.I. 1996/911
- Electricity Supply Industry and Water Undertakers (Rateable Values) Amendment Order 1996 S.I. 1996/912
- Offshore Installations and Wells (Design and Construction, etc.) Regulations 1996 S.I. 1996/913
- Waste Management Licensing (Scotland) Regulations 1996 S.I. 1996/916
- Local Government Act 1988 (Defined Activities) (Specified Periods) (Scotland) Regulations 1996 S.I. 1996/917
- Local Government Finance Act 1992 (Commencement No. 10) Order 1996 S.I. 1996/918
- Environmentally Sensitive Areas (Somerset Levels and Moors) Designation (Amendment) Order 1996 S.I. 1996/920
- Environmentally Sensitive Areas (The Broads) Designation (Amendment) Order 1996 S.I. 1996/921
- Environmentally Sensitive Areas (West Penwith) Designation (Amendment) Order 1996 S.I. 1996/922
- Environmentally Sensitive Areas (Pennine Dales) Designation (Amendment) Order 1996 S.I. 1996/923
- Environmentally Sensitive Areas (South Downs) Designation (Amendment) Order 1996 S.I. 1996/924
- A205 Trunk Road (Mortlake Road, Richmond upon Thames) (Vehicle Height Restriction) Order 1996 S.I. 1996/925
- A16 Trunk Road (Fotherby Bypass) Order 1996 S.I. 1996/926
- A41 Trunk Road (Park Road, Westminster) (Temporary Prohibition of Traffic) Order 1996 S.I. 1996/929
- Combined Probation Areas (Suffolk) Order 1996 S.I. 1996/930
- Combined Probation Areas (Nottinghamshire) Order 1996 S.I. 1996/931
- Combined Probation Areas (Hampshire) Order 1996 S.I. 1996/932
- Combined Probation Areas (Derbyshire) Order 1996 S.I. 1996/933
- Elsecar Steam Railway Order 1996 (SI 1996/937)
- National Health Service (Service Committees and Tribunal) (Scotland) Amendment Regulations 1996 S.I. 1996/938
- Social Security Benefits (Maintenance Payments and Consequential Amendments) Regulations 1996 S.I. 1996/940
- Passenger and Goods Vehicles (Recording Equipment) Regulations 1996 S.I. 1996/941
- Insurance Companies (Amendment) Regulations 1996 S.I. 1996/942
- Insurance Companies (Accounts and Statements) Regulations 1996 S.I. 1996/943
- Insurance Companies (Amendment No. 2) Regulations 1996 S.I. 1996/944
- Insurance Companies (Reserves) Act 1995 (Commencement) Order 1996 S.I. 1996/945
- Insurance Companies (Reserves) Regulations 1996 S.I. 1996/946
- Deregulation (Length of the School Day) Order 1996 S.I. 1996/951
- Combined Probation Areas (West Glamorgan) Order 1996 S.I. 1996/956
- Combined Probation Areas (West Sussex) Order 1996 S.I. 1996/957
- Motor Vehicles (Type Approval and Approval Marks) (Fees) Regulations 1996 S.I. 1996/958
- Rent Officers (Additional Functions) (Amendment) Order 1996 S.I. 1996/959
- London Cab Order 1996 S.I. 1996/960
- Beef (Emergency Control) Order 1996 1996/961
- Bovine Spongiform Encephalopathy (Amendment) Order 1996 S.I. 1996/962
- Specified Bovine Material Order 1996 S.I. 1996/963
- Housing Benefit (General) Amendment Regulations 1996 S.I. 1996/965
- Central Manchester Development Corporation (Dissolution) Order 1996 S.I. 1996/966
- Genetically Modified Organisms (Contained Use) (Amendment) Regulations 1996 S.I. 1996/967
- National Health Service Litigation Authority (Amendment) Regulations 1996 S.I. 1996/968
- Regional Health Authorities (Transfer of Trust Property) Amendment Order 1996 S.I. 1996/969
- Health Service Commissioners (Amendment) Act 1996 (Commencement) Order 1996 S.I. 1996/970
- Health Authorities Act 1995 (Amendment of Transitional Provisions and Modification of References) Order 1996 (SI 1996/971)
- Special Waste Regulations 1996 S.I. 1996/972
- Environment Act 1995 (Consequential and Transitional Provisions) (Scotland) Regulations 1996 S.I. 1996/973
- Local Government (Translation Amendments) (Scotland) Order 1996 S.I. 1996/974
- Rent Officers (Additional Functions) (Scotland) Amendment Order 1996 S.I. 1996/975
- Chester–Holyhead Trunk Road (A55) (Llanfair Pwllgwyngyll to Bryngwran) Order 1996 S.I. 1996/976
- Deregulation (Special Hours Certificates) Order 1996 S.I. 1996/977
- Licensing (Special Hours Certificates) (Amendment) Rules 1996 S.I. 1996/978
- Environmental Protection (Applications, Appeals and Registers) (Amendment No. 2) Regulations 1996 S.I. 1996/979
- Income Tax (Employments) (Amendment No. 2) Regulations 1996 S.I. 1996/980
- Income Tax (Sub-contractors in the Construction Industry) (Amendment) Regulations 1996 S.I. 1996/981
- Walton Centre for Neurology and Neurosurgery National Health Service Trust (Establishment) Amendment Order 1996 S.I. 1996/982
- South Manchester University Hospitals National Health Service Trust (Establishment) Amendment Order 1996 S.I. 1996/983
- North Durham Acute Hospitals National Health Service Trust (Establishment) Amendment Order 1996 S.I. 1996/984
- West Middlesex University Hospitals National Health Service Trust (Establishment) Amendment Order 1996 S.I. 1996/985
- Gloucestershire Royal National Health Service Trust (Establishment) Amendment Order 1996 S.I. 1996/986
- Swindon and Marlborough National Health Service Trust (Establishment) Amendment Order 1996 S.I. 1996/987
- Hull and Holderness Community Health National Health Service Trust (Establishment) Amendment Order 1996 S.I. 1996/988
- Bishop Auckland Hospitals National Health Service Trust (Establishment) Amendment Order 1996 S.I. 1996/989
- Hereford Hospitals National Health Service Trust (Establishment) Amendment Order 1996 S.I. 1996/990
- Rochdale Healthcare National Health Service Trust (Establishment) Amendment Order 1996 S.I. 1996/991
- Wellhouse National Health Service Trust (Establishment) Amendment Order 1996 S.I. 1996/992
- Essex Rivers Healthcare National Health Service Trust (Establishment) Amendment Order 1996 S.I. 1996/993
- Dartford and Gravesham National Health Service Trust (Establishment) Amendment Order 1996 S.I. 1996/994
- Private International Law (Miscellaneous Provisions) Act 1995 (Commencement) Order 1996 S.I. 1996/995
- St James's and Seacroft University Hospitals National Health Service Trust (Establishment) Amendment Order 1996 S.I. 1996/996
- Thameside Community Health Care National Health Service Trust (Establishment) Amendment Order 1996 S.I. 1996/997
- South Buckinghamshire National Health Service Trust (Establishment) Amendment Order 1996 S.I. 1996/998
- South Devon Health Care National Health Service Trust (Establishment) Amendment Order 1996 S.I. 1996/999
- Bexley Community Health National Health Service Trust (Establishment) Amendment Order 1996 S.I. 1996/1000

== 1001–1100 ==
- Norfolk and Norwich Health Care National Health Service Trust (Establishment) Amendment Order 1996 S.I. 1996/1001
- East Yorkshire Community Healthcare National Health Service Trust (Establishment) Amendment Order 1996 S.I. 1996/1002
- Education (School Teachers' Pay and Conditions) Order 1996 S.I. 1996/1003
- Registers of Scotland Executive Agency Trading Fund Order 1996 S.I. 1996/1004
- Sheriff Court Districts (Alteration of Boundaries) Order 1996 S.I. 1996/1005
- Sheriffdoms (Alteration of Boundaries) Order 1996 S.I. 1996/1006
- Regional Flood Defence Committee (Welsh Region) (Amendment) Order 1996 S.I. 1996/1007
- Local Government Reorganisation (Wales) (Consequential Amendments No. 2) Order 1996 S.I. 1996/1008
- Criminal Legal Aid (Scotland) (Prescribed Proceedings) Amendment Regulations 1996 S.I. 1996/1009
- Advice and Assistance (Financial Conditions) (Scotland) Regulations 1996 S.I. 1996/1010
- Advice and Assistance (Assistance by Way of Representation) (Scotland) Amendment Regulations 1996 S.I. 1996/1011
- Civil Legal Aid (Financial Conditions) (Scotland) Regulations 1996 S.I. 1996/1012
- Lloyd's Underwriters (Gilt-edged Securities) (Periodic Accounting for Tax on Interest) (Amendment) Regulations 1996 S.I. 1996/1014
- Gilt-edged Securities (Periodic Accounting for Tax on Interest) (Amendment) Regulations 1996 S.I. 1996/1015
- Lands Tribunal (Fees) Rules 1996 S.I. 1996/1021
- Lands Tribunal Rules 1996 S.I. 1996/1022
- Employment Protection (Continuity of Employment of National Health Service Employees) (Modification) Order 1996 S.I. 1996/1023
- Magistrates' Courts Committees (Bolton, Bury, Rochdale, Salford and Wigan) Amalgamation Order 1996 S.I. 1996/1024
- A501 Trunk Road (Marylebone Road, Westminster) (Temporary Prohibition of Traffic) (No. 2) Order 1996 S.I. 1996/1027
- Superannuation (Admission to Schedule 1 of the Superannuation Act 1972) (No. 2) Order 1996 S.I. 1996/1029
- Environment Act 1995 (Isles of Scilly) Order 1996 S.I. 1996/1030
- Capital Gains Tax (Gilt-edged Securities) Order 1996 S.I. 1996/1031
- North Eastern Sea Fisheries District (Constitution of Committee and Expenses) (Variation) Order 1996 S.I. 1996/1034
- Fishing Boats (Specified Countries) Designation Order 1996 S.I. 1996/1035
- Third Country Fishing (Enforcement) Order 1996 S.I. 1996/1036
- Beef (Emergency Control) (Amendment) Order 1996 S.I. 1996/1043
- A23 Trunk Road (Purley Cross Junction Improvement) Trunking Order 1996 S.I. 1996/1046
- Social Security (Contributions) Amendment (No. 4) Regulations 1996 S.I. 1996/1047
- Social Security (Reduced Rates of Class 1 Contributions) (Salary Related Contracted-out Schemes) Order 1996 S.I. 1996/1054
- Social Security (Reduced Rates of Class 1 Contributions and Rebates) (Money Purchase Contracted-out Schemes) Order 1996 S.I. 1996/1055
- Social Security (Minimum Contributions to Appropriate Personal Pension Schemes) Order 1996 S.I. 1996/1056
- Licensing (Fees) (Amendment) Order 1996 S.I. 1996/1063
- Local Government Act 1988 (Defined Activities) (Exemption) (Stockport Borough Council) Order 1996 S.I. 1996/1064
- New Town (Glenrothes) Dissolution Order 1996 S.I. 1996/1065
- New Town (East Kilbride) Dissolution Order 1996 S.I. 1996/1066
- Statutory Nuisance (Appeals) (Scotland) Regulations 1996 S.I. 1996/1076
- A41 Trunk Road (Gloucester Place/Ivor Place, Westminster) (Temporary Prohibition of Traffic) Order 1996 S.I. 1996/1077
- A501 Trunk Road (Grays Inn Road, Camden) (Temporary Prohibition of Traffic) Order 1996 S.I. 1996/1078
- Buying Agency Trading Fund (Amendment) Order 1996 S.I. 1996/1080
- A406 Trunk Road (Ealing and Hounslow) Red Route Experimental Traffic Order 1996 S.I. 1996/1088
- A406 Trunk Road (North Circular Road, Ealing) Red Route (Prescribed Routes and Turns No. 1) Experimental Traffic Order 1996 S.I. 1996/1089
- A406 Trunk Road (North Circular Road, Hounslow) Red Route (Prescribed Route No. 1) Experimental Traffic Order 1996 S.I. 1996/1090
- Beef (Emergency Control) (Amendment) (No. 2) Order 1996 S.I. 1996/1091
- Chemicals (Hazard Information and Packaging for Supply) (Amendment) Regulations 1996 S.I. 1996/1092
- North of Scotland Milk Marketing Board Dissolution Order 1996 S.I. 1996/1093
- Aberdeen and District Milk Marketing Board Dissolution Order 1996 S.I. 1996/1094
- Bath-Lincoln Trunk Road A46 (Upper Swainswick to A420 Cold Ashton Roundabout) Orders 1987 Revocation Order 1996 S.I. 1996/1097
- A629 Trunk Road (Skipton To Kildwick Improvement and Slip Roads) Order 1996 S.I. 1996/1100

== 1101–1200 ==
- A629 Trunk Road (Ings Lane to Cononley Lane) (Detrunking) Order 1996 S.I. 1996/1101
- Prohibition of Keeping of Live Fish (Crayfish) Order 1996 S.I. 1996/1104
- Companies (Principal Business Activities) (Amendment) Regulations 1996 S.I. 1996/1105
- Genetically Modified Organisms (Risk Assessment) (Records and Exemptions) Regulations 1996 S.I. 1996/1106
- Prohibition of Keeping of Live Fish (Crayfish) (Scotland) Order 1996 S.I. 1996/1107
- Smoke Control Areas (Exempted Fireplaces) Order 1996 S.I. 1996/1108
- Gaming Clubs (Hours and Charges) (Amendment) Regulations 1996 S.I. 1996/1109
- Road Traffic (Special Parking Area) (Royal Borough of Kingston upon Thames) (Amendment) Order 1996 S.I. 1996/1110
- Animals and Animal Products (Import and Export) (Amendment) Regulations 1996 S.I. 1996/1111
- Road Traffic (Special Parking Area) (London Borough of Newham) (Amendment) Order 1996 S.I. 1996/1112
- A4 Trunk Road (Great West Road, Hounslow) (Prohibition Of Use Of Gap In Central Reserve) Order 1996 S.I. 1996/1113
- Dual-Use and Related Goods (Export Control) (Amendment) Regulations 1996 S.I. 1996/1124
- Fertilisers (Mammalian Meat and Bone Meal) Regulations 1996 S.I. 1996/1125
- Jobseekers Act 1995 (Commencement No. 2) Order 1996 S.I. 1996/1126
- Passenger Car Fuel Consumption (Amendment) Order 1996 S.I. 1996/1132
- Social Security Revaluation of Earnings Factors Order 1996 S.I. 1996/1133
- A406 Trunk Road (North Circular Road, Ealing) Red Route (Prescribed Turns No. 2) Experimental Traffic Order 1996 S.I. 1996/1134
- A501 Trunk Road (Swinton Street, Camden) (Temporary Prohibition of Traffic) Order 1996 S.I. 1996/1135
- A501 Trunk Road (Camden and Islington) Red Route Experimental Traffic Order 1996 S.I. 1996/1136
- A501 Trunk Road (Camden, Islington and Westminster) Red Route Experimental Traffic Order 1996 S.I. 1996/1137
- Hong Kong (Overseas Public Servants) (Retirement and Compensation) Order 1996 S.I. 1996/1138
- Hong Kong (Overseas Public Servants) (Continuing Service: Compensation) Order 1996 S.I. 1996/1139
- Prevention of Terrorism (Temporary Provisions) Act 1984 (Jersey) (Revocation) Order 1996 S.I. 1996/1140
- Juries (Northern Ireland) Order 1996 S.I. 1996/1141
- Maximum Number of Judges Order 1996 S.I. 1996/1142
- Merchant Shipping (Liability and Compensation for Oil Pollution Damage) (Transitional Provisions) Order 1996 S.I. 1996/1143
- Gaming Clubs (Hours and Charges) (Scotland) Amendment Regulations 1996 S.I. 1996/1144
- Smoke Control Areas (Authorised Fuels) (Amendment) Regulations 1996 S.I. 1996/1145
- Education (Individual Pupils' Achievements) (Information) (Amendment) Regulations 1996 S.I. 1996/1146
- Fresh Meat (Hygiene and Inspection) (Amendment) Regulations 1996 S.I. 1996/1148
- Insurance Brokers Registration Council (Conduct of Investment Business) Rules Approval Order 1996 S.I. 1996/1151
- A501 Trunk Road (Marylebone Road/Nottingham Place, Westminster) (Temporary Prohibition of Traffic) Order 1996 S.I. 1996/1157
- A4 Trunk Road (Hillingdon) Red Route (Clearway) Traffic Order 1996 S.I. 1996/1163
- Plant Health (Great Britain) (Amendment) (No. 2) Order 1996 S.I. 1996/1165
- Beef (Emergency Control) (Amendment) (No. 3) Order 1996 S.I. 1996/1166
- A4 Trunk Road (Hounslow) Red Route (Clearway) Traffic Order 1996 S.I. 1996/1170
- Road Traffic (Permitted Parking Area and Special Parking Area) (County of Hampshire, City of Winchester) Order 1996 S.I. 1996/1171
- Occupational Pension Schemes (Contracting-out) Regulations 1996 S.I. 1996/1172
- Armed Forces Act 1991 (Commencement No. 2) Order 1996 S.I. 1996/1173
- Armed Forces (Protection of Children of Service Families) Regulations 1996 S.I. 1996/1174
- London Cab (No. 2) Order 1996 S.I. 1996/1176
- Register of County Court Judgments (Amendment) Regulations 1996 S.I. 1996/1177
- County Council of Northumberland (Duplicate North Seaton Bridge) Scheme 1995 Confirmation Instrument 1996 S.I. 1996/1178
- European Investment Bank (Designated International Organisation) Order 1996 S.I. 1996/1179
- Insurance Companies (Gilt-edged Securities) (Periodic Accounting for Tax on Interest) (Amendment) Regulations 1996 S.I. 1996/1180
- Gilt-edged Securities (Periodic Accounting for Tax on Interest) (Amendment No. 2) Regulations 1996 S.I. 1996/1181
- Lloyd's Underwriters (Gilt-edged Securities) (Periodic Accounting for Tax on Interest) (Amendment No. 2) Regulations 1996 S.I. 1996/1182
- Aberystwyth Harbour Revision Order 1995 S.I. 1996/1183
- Income Tax (Interest Relief) (Amendment) Regulations 1996 S.I. 1996/1184
- Vocational Training (Tax Relief) (Amendment) Regulations 1996 S.I. 1996/1185
- North Hull Housing Action Trust (Transfer of Property) Order 1996 S.I. 1996/1186
- Deregulation (Friendly Societies Act 1992) Order 1996 S.I. 1996/1188
- Deregulation (Credit Unions) Order 1996 S.I. 1996/1189]
- A303 Trunk Road (Sparkford To Ilchester Improvement And Slip Roads) (Detrunking) Order 1996 S.I. 1996/1190
- A303 Trunk Road (Sparkford to Ilchester Improvement and Slip Roads) Order 1996 S.I. 1996/1191
- Specified Bovine Material (No. 2) Order 1996 S.I. 1996/1192
- Bovine Animals (Enforcement of Community Purchase Scheme) Regulations 1996 S.I. 1996/1193
- Offshore Installations (Safety Zones) (No. 3) Order 1996 S.I. 1996/1194
- Value Added Tax (Payments on Account) (Amendment) Order 1996 S.I. 1996/1196
- Financial Services Act 1986 (Gas Industry Exemption) (Amendment) Order 1996 S.I. 1996/1197
- Value Added Tax (Amendment) (No. 2) Regulations 1996 S.I. 1996/1198
- Children's Hearings (Scotland) Amendment Rules 1996 S.I. 1996/1199

== 1201–1300 ==
- Public Telecommunication System Designation (Torch Communications Limited) Order 1996 S.I. 1996/1203
- Merchant Shipping Act 1995 (Appointed Day No. 1) Order 1996 S.I. 1996/1210
- Deregulation (Salmon Fisheries (Scotland) Act 1868) Order 1996 S.I. 1996/1211
- Food Protection (Emergency Prohibitions) (Oil and Chemical Pollution of Salmon and Migratory Trout) (Revocation) Order 1996 S.I. 1996/1212
- Food Protection (Emergency Prohibitions) (Oil and Chemical Pollution of Fish and Plants (Partial Revocation) Order 1996 S.I. 1996/1213
- Local Government Reorganisation (Wales) (Staff) (No. 3) Order 1996 S.I. 1996/1214
- Local Authorities (Members' Interests) (Amendment) Regulations 1996 S.I. 1996/1215
- Occupational Pension Schemes (Member-nominated Trustees and Directors) Regulations 1996 S.I. 1996/1216
- Housing Benefit and Council Tax Benefit (Subsidy) Order 1996 S.I. 1996/1217
- General Medical Council Preliminary Proceedings Committee and Professional Conduct Committee (Procedure) (Amendment) Rules Order of Council 1996 S.I. 1996/1218
- General Medical Council Health Committee (Procedure) (Amendment) Rules Order of Council 1996 S.I. 1996/1219
- Elections (Northern Ireland) Order 1996 S.I. 1996/1220
- A501 Trunk Road (Euston Road/Gower Street, Camden) (Temporary Prohibition of Traffic) Order 1996 S.I. 1996/1222
- A501 Trunk Road (Marylebone Road/Glentworth Street, Westminster) (Temporary Prohibition of Traffic) Order 1996 S.I. 1996/1223
- National Park Authorities (Wales) (Amendment No. 2) Order 1996 S.I. 1996/1224
- Education (Coleg Normal Bangor Higher Education Corporation) (Dissolution) Order 1996 S.I. 1996/1225
- Income Tax (Unapproved Manufactured Payments) Regulations 1996 S.I. 1996/1226
- Income Tax (Manufactured Interest) (Amendment) Regulations 1996 S.I. 1996/1227
- Income Tax (Stock Lending) (Amendment) Regulations 1996 S.I. 1996/1228
- Income Tax (Manufactured Overseas Dividends) (Amendment) Regulations 1996 S.I. 1996/1229
- A35 Trunk Road (Chideock Morcombelake Bypass) Order 1996 S.I. 1996/1230
- Local Government Reorganisation (Compensation for Redundancy or Loss of Remuneration) (Education) Regulations 1996 S.I. 1996/1240
- Local Government (Superannuation and Compensation for Premature Retirement) (Scotland) Amendment Regulations 1996 S.I. 1996/1241
- Fishing Vessels (Decommissioning) Scheme 1996 S.I. 1996/1242
- National Park Authorities (England) Order 1996 S.I. 1996/1243
- Local Government Act 1988 (Defined Activities) (Exemption) (London Borough of Greenwich) Order 1996 S.I. 1996/1244
- Social Security (Additional Pension) (Contributions Paid in Error) Regulations 1996 S.I. 1996/1245
- Finance Act 1996, section 26, (Appointed Day) Order 1996 S.I. 1996/1249
- Value Added Tax (Amendment) (No. 3) Regulations 1996 S.I. 1996/1250
- Hydrocarbon Oil (Designated Markers) Regulations 1996 S.I. 1996/1251
- Income Support (Pilot Scheme) Regulations 1996 S.I. 1996/1252
- Value Added Tax (Fiscal Warehousing) (Treatment of Transactions) Order 1996 S.I. 1996/1255
- Value Added Tax (Cultural Services) Order 1996 S.I. 1996/1256
- Civil Legal Aid (General) (Amendment) (No. 2) Regulations 1996 S.I. 1996/1257
- Legal Aid in Criminal and Care Proceedings (General) (Amendment) (No. 3) Regulations 1996 S.I. 1996/1258
- Motor Vehicles (Driving Licences) (Amendment) (No. 3) Regulations 1996 S.I. 1996/1259
- Feeding Stuffs (Amendment) Regulations 1996 S.I. 1996/1260
- Medicines (Animal Feeding Stuffs) (Enforcement) (Amendment) Regulations 1996 S.I. 1996/1261
- Churnet Valley Light Railway Order 1996 (SI 1996/1267)
- Charities (Trustee Investments Act 1961) Order 1996 S.I. 1996/1268
- Housing (Change of Landlord) (Payment of Disposal Cost by Instalments) (Amendment No. 2) Regulations 1996 S.I. 1996/1269
- Occupational Pension Schemes (Internal Dispute Resolution Procedures) Regulations 1996 S.I. 1996/1270
- Personal and Occupational Pension Schemes (Pensions Ombudsman) Amendment Regulations 1996 S.I. 1996/1271
- Housing and Planning Act 1986 (Commencement No. 19) (Scotland) Order 1996 S.I. 1996/1276
- Waste Management Licensing (Amendment) Regulations 1996 S.I. 1996/1279
- Redundant Mineworkers (Payments Schemes) (Amendment and Consolidation) Order 1996 S.I. 1996/1288
- European Communities (Definition of Treaties) (Partnership and Co-operation Agreement between the European Communities and their Member States and the Republic of Belarus) Order 1996 S.I. 1996/1290
- European Communities (Definition of Treaties) (Partnership and Co-operation Agreement between the European Communities and their Member States and the Republic of Kazakhstan) Order 1996 S.I. 1996/1291
- European Communities (Definition of Treaties) (Partnership and Co-operation Agreement between the European Communities and their Member States and the Kyrgyz Republic) Order 1996 S.I. 1996/1292
- European Communities (Definition of Treaties) (Partnership and Co-operation Agreement between the European Communities and their Member States and the Republic of Moldova) Order 1996 S.I. 1996/1293
- Hong Kong (Overseas Public Servants) (Pension Supplements) Order 1996 S.I. 1996/1294
- International Oil Pollution Compensation Fund 1992 (Immunities and Privileges) Order 1996 S.I. 1996/1295
- United Nations (International Tribunal) (Rwanda) Order 1996 S.I. 1996/1296
- Commissioner for Complaints (Northern Ireland) Order 1996 S.I. 1996/1297
- Ombudsman (Northern Ireland) Order 1996 S.I. 1996/1298
- Proceeds of Crime (Northern Ireland) Order 1996 S.I. 1996/1299
- Misuse of Drugs Act 1971 (Modification) Order 1996 S.I. 1996/1300

== 1301–1400 ==
- Air Navigation (Amendment) Order 1996 S.I. 1996/1301
- Lotteries (Amendment) Regulations 1996 S.I. 1996/1306
- Jobseeker's Allowance (Pilot Scheme) Regulations 1996 S.I. 1996/1307
- Insolvent Partnerships (Amendment) Order 1996 S.I. 1996/1308
- Fossil Fuel Levy (Amendment) Regulations 1996 S.I. 1996/1309
- Personal Pension Schemes (Tables of Rates of Annuities) Regulations 1996 S.I. 1996/1311
- Income Tax (Employments) (Amendment No. 3) Regulations 1996 S.I. 1996/1312
- National Health Service (Appointment of Consultants) (Wales) Regulations 1996 S.I. 1996/1313
- Housing Benefit and Council Tax Benefit (Subsidy) Amendment Regulations 1996 S.I. 1996/1314
- Severn Bridges Regulations 1996 S.I. 1996/1316
- Food Protection (Emergency Prohibitions) (Oil and Chemical Pollution of Fish and Plants) (Partial Revocation No. 2) Order 1996 S.I. 1996/1319
- Road Traffic Offenders (Northern Ireland) Order 1996 S.I. 1996/1320
- Taxes (Interest Rate) (Amendment No. 2) Regulations 1996 S.I. 1996/1321
- Financial Services Act 1986 (Uncertificated Securities) (Extension of Scope of Act) Order 1996 S.I. 1996/1322
- Capital Allowances Act 1990, section 33A, (Appointed Day) Order 1996 S.I. 1996/1323
- Education (Schools) Act 1992 (Commencement No. 4) Order 1996 S.I. 1996/1325
- Electricity (Restrictive Trade Practices Act 1976) (Exemptions) Order 1996 S.I. 1996/1327
- Housing Renovation etc. Grants (Reduction of Grant) (Amendment) Regulations 1996 S.I. 1996/1331
- Housing Renovation etc. Grants (Prescribed Forms and Particulars) (Amendment) Regulations 1996 S.I. 1996/1332
- Disability Discrimination (Sub-leases and Sub-tenancies) Regulations 1996 S.I. 1996/1333
- Education (Grant-Maintained and Grant-Maintained Special Schools) (Finance) (Wales) (Amendment) Regulations 1996 S.I. 1996/1334
- Statutory Maternity Pay (General) Amendment Regulations 1996 S.I. 1996/1335
- Disability Discrimination Act 1995 (Commencement No. 2) Order 1996 (SI 1996/1336)
- Public Lending Right Scheme 1982 (Commencement of Variations) Order 1996 S.I. 1996/1338
- Deregulation (Long Pull) Order 1996 S.I. 1996/1339
- A501 Trunk Road (Marylebone Road/Park Crescent Mews West, Westminster) (Temporary Prohibition of Traffic) Order 1996 S.I. 1996/1340
- Export of Goods (Control) (Amendment) Order 1996 S.I. 1996/1341
- Fertilisers (Sampling and Analysis) Regulations 1996 S.I. 1996/1342
- A501 Trunk Road (Camden and Islington) Red Route (Bus Lanes) Experimental Traffic Order 1996 S.I. 1996/1343
- A501 Trunk Road (Camden) Red Route (Bus Lane) (No. 1.) Experimental Traffic Order 1996 S.I. 1996/1344
- Social Security and Child Support (Jobseeker's Allowance) (Consequential Amendments) Regulations 1996 S.I. 1996/1345
- National Health Service (Travelling Expenses and Remission of Charges) Amendment (No. 2) Regulations 1996 S.I. 1996/1346
- Exchange Gains and Losses (Alternative Method of Calculation of Gain or Loss) (Amendment) Regulations 1996 S.I. 1996/1347
- Exchange Gains and Losses (Deferral of Gains and Losses) (Amendment) Regulations 1996 S.I. 1996/1348
- Exchange Gains and Losses (Transitional Provisions) (Amendment) Regulations 1996 S.I. 1996/1349
- Radioactive Material (Road Transport) (Great Britain) Regulations 1996 S.I. 1996/1350
- Bovine Spongiform Encephalopathy Compensation (Amendment) Order 1996 S.I. 1996/1351
- Brucellosis and Tuberculosis (England and Wales) Compensation (Amendment) Order 1996 S.I. 1996/1352
- Recreational Craft Regulations 1996 S.I. 1996/1353
- Gas Act 1986 (Exemptions) (No. 3) Order 1996 (SI 1996/1354)
- Personal Equity Plan (Amendment No. 2) Regulations 1996 S.I. 1996/1355
- Railways (Closure Provisions) (Exemptions) Order 1996 S.I. 1996/1356
- Brucellosis and Tuberculosis Compensation (Scotland) Amendment Order 1996 S.I. 1996/1358
- Deregulation (Gaming Machines and Betting Office Facilities) Order 1996 S.I. 1996/1359
- Compensation for Redundancy or Premature Retirement (Scottish Environment Protection Agency and River Purification Boards Transitional Arrangements) (Scotland) Regulations 1996 S.I. 1996/1360
- Income Support (General) (Standard Interest Rate Amendment) Regulations 1996 S.I. 1996/1363
- Local Government Reorganisation (Wales) (Capital Finance) (Amendment) Order 1996 S.I. 1996/1366
- Erskine Bridge Tolls Extension Order 1996 (SI 1996/1370)
- Council Tax Limitation (England) (Maximum Amounts) Order 1996 S.I. 1996/1371
- Notification of Existing Substances (Enforcement) (Amendment) Regulations 1996 S.I. 1996/1373
- Prohibition of Keeping of Live Fish (Crayfish) (Amendment) Order 1996 S.I. 1996/1374
- Housing Renovation etc. Grants (Prescribed Forms and Particulars) (Welsh Forms and Particulars) (Amendment) Regulations 1996 S.I. 1996/1378
- Local Statutory Provisions (Exemption of St. Andrews Links Trust) (Scotland) Order 1996 S.I. 1996/1382
- Public Telecommunication System Designation (SWEB Telecoms Limited) Order 1996 S.I. 1996/1384
- Rules of Procedure (Army) (Amendment) Rules 1996 S.I. 1996/1388
- Rules of Procedure (Air Force) (Amendment) Rules 1996 S.I. 1996/1389
- Civil Aviation (Air Travel Organisers' Licensing) (Amendment) Regulations 1996 S.I. 1996/1390
- Local Government Act 1988 (Defined Activities) (Exemption) (Worthing Borough Council) Order 1996 S.I. 1996/1391
- Aerodromes (Designation) (Facilities for Consultation) Order 1996 S.I. 1996/1392
- Rules of the Air Regulations 1996 S.I. 1996/1393

== 1401–1500 ==
- A61 Trunk Road (B6131 Bar Lane, Mapplewell to Barnsley/Wakefield Metropolitan Boundary) (Detrunking) Order 1996. S.I. 1996/1401
- Pharmaceutical Qualifications (Recognition) Regulations 1996 S.I. 1996/1405
- Pleasure Craft (Arrival and Report) Regulations 1996 S.I. 1996/1406
- Northern Ireland Elections (Returning Officer's Charges) Order 1996 S.I. 1996/1408
- National Disability Council (No. 2) Regulations 1996 S.I. 1996/1410
- Pensions Act 1995 (Commencement No. 4) Order 1996 S.I. 1996/1412
- Family Credit (General) Amendment Regulations 1996 S.I. 1996/1418
- Cromarty Firth Port Authority Harbour Revision Order 1996 S.I. 1996/1419
- Armed Forces (Compensation Limits) Order 1996 S.I. 1996/1420
- Amusement Machine Licence Duty (Small-prize Machines) Order 1996 S.I. 1996/1422
- Amusement Machine Licence Duty (Special Licences) Regulations 1996 S.I. 1996/1423
- Deposits in the Sea (Public Registers of Information) Regulations 1996 S.I. 1996/1427
- Local Government Pension Scheme (Amendment) Regulations 1996 S.I. 1996/1428
- A66 Trunk Road (Stainburn and Great Clifton Bypass) Order 1996 S.I. 1996/1429
- A66 Trunk Road (Stainburn and Great Clifton Bypass) (De-Trunking) Order 1996 S.I. 1996/1430
- Financial Assistance for Environmental Purposes (No. 2) Order 1996 S.I. 1996/1431
- Nottingham Healthcare National Health Service Trust (Transfer of Trust Property) Order 1996 S.I. 1996/1432
- Grantham and District Hospital National Health Service Trust (Transfer of Trust Property) Order 1996 S.I. 1996/1433
- Welfare Food Regulations 1996 S.I. 1996/1434
- Personal Pension Schemes (Appropriate Schemes and Disclosure of Information) (Miscellaneous Amendments) Regulations 1996 S.I. 1996/1435
- Social Security (Disability Living Allowance and Claims and Payments) Amendment Regulations 1996 S.I. 1996/1436
- Dolgellau to South of Birkenhead Trunk Road (A494) (Drws y Nant Improvement) Order 1996 S.I. 1996/1437
- Social Fund Maternity and Funeral Expenses (General) Amendment Regulations 1996 S.I. 1996/1443
- Companies (Fees) (Amendment) Regulations 1996 S.I. 1996/1444
- Consumer Credit (Exempt Agreements) (Amendment) Order 1996 1996/1445
- Cosmetic Products (Safety) (Amendment) Regulations 1996 S.I. 1996/1446
- Defence Evaluation and Research Agency Trading Fund (Amendment) Order 1996 S.I. 1996/1447
- National Enterprise Board (Dissolution) Order 1996 S.I. 1996/1448
- Local Government Act 1988 (Defined Activities) (Exemption) (Bromley London Borough Council) Order 1996 S.I. 1996/1449
- Oil and Fibre Plant Seeds (Amendment) Regulations 1996 S.I. 1996/1451
- Vegetable Seeds (Amendment) Regulations 1996 S.I. 1996/1452
- Fodder Plant Seeds (Amendment) Regulations 1996 S.I. 1996/1453
- Home-Grown Cereals Authority (Rate of Levy) Order 1996 S.I. 1996/1454
- Disability Discrimination (Meaning of Disability) Regulations 1996 S.I. 1996/1455
- Disability Discrimination (Employment) Regulations 1996 S.I. 1996/1456
- A10 Trunk Road (Enfield and Haringey) Red Route (Bus Lanes) (No. 1) Traffic Order 1996 S.I. 1996/1459
- Social Security (Claims and Payments) (Jobseeker's Allowance Consequential Amendments) Regulations 1996 S.I. 1996/1460
- Protected Rights (Transfer Payment) Regulations 1996 S.I. 1996/1461
- Contracting-out (Transfer and Transfer Payment) Regulations 1996 S.I. 1996/1462
- A10 Trunk Road (Enfield) Red Route (Bus Lanes) (No. 2) Traffic Order 1996 S.I. 1996/1463
- Wireless Telegraphy (Licence Charges) (Amendment) Regulations 1996 S.I. 1996/1464
- Financial Markets and Insolvency Regulations 1996 S.I. 1996/1469
- Inheritance Tax (Delivery of Accounts) Regulations 1996 S.I. 1996/1470
- Deregulation (Resolutions of Private Companies) Order 1996 S.I. 1996/1471
- Inheritance Tax (Delivery of Accounts) (Scotland) Regulations 1996 S.I. 1996/1472
- Inheritance Tax (Delivery of Accounts) (Northern Ireland) Regulations 1996 S.I. 1996/1473
- Disability Discrimination Act 1995 (Commencement No. 3 and Saving and Transitional Provisions) Order 1996 (SI 1996/1474)
- Inshore Fishing (Prohibition of Fishing and Fishing Methods) (Scotland) Amendment Order 1996 S.I. 1996/1475
- Overseas Service (Pensions Supplement) (Amendment) Regulations 1996 S.I. 1996/1476
- Sweeteners in Food (Amendment) Regulations 1996 S.I. 1996/1477
- Habitat (Former Set-Aside Land) (Amendment) Regulations 1996 S.I. 1996/1478
- Habitat (Salt-Marsh) (Amendment) Regulations 1996 S.I. 1996/1479
- Habitat (Water Fringe) (Amendment) Regulations 1996 (SI 1996/1480)
- Countryside Stewardship (Amendment) (Extension to the Isles of Scilly) Regulations 1996 (SI 1996/1481)
- Arable Area Payments (Amendment) Regulations 1996 (SI 1996/1482
- Highways (Road Humps) Regulations 1996 (SI 1996/1483)
- Manchester Ship Canal (Bridgewater Canal) Act 1907 (Amendment) Order 1996 (SI 1996/1484)
- Exchange Gains and Losses (Insurance Companies) (Amendment No. 2) Regulations 1996 (SI 1996/1485)
- Seeds (Fees) (Amendment) Regulations 1996 (SI 1996/1486)
- Pesticides (Maximum Residue Levels in Crops, Food and Feeding Stuffs) (Amendment) Regulations 1996 (SI 1996/1487)
- Suckler Cow Premium (Amendment) Regulations 1996 (SI 1996/1488)
- A19 Trunk Road (A19/A64 Fulford Interchange Improvement) Order 1996 (SI 1996/1491)
- Offshore Installations (Safety Zones) (No. 4) Order 1996 (SI 1996/1492)
- European Parliamentary (United Kingdom Representatives) Pensions (Amendment) Order 1996 (SI 1996/1493)
- Civil Aviation Authority (Amendment) Regulations 1996 (SI 1996/1494)
- Civil Aviation (Route Charges for Navigation Services) (Amendment) Regulations 1996 (SI 1996/1495)
- Dental Qualifications (Recognition) Regulations 1996 (SI 1996/1496)
- Food Labelling Regulations 1996 (SI 1996/1499)
- Hill Livestock (Compensatory Allowances) Regulations 1996 (SI 1996/1500)

== 1501–1600 ==
- Bread and Flour (Amendment) Regulations 1996 S.I. 1996/1501
- Food (Lot Marking) Regulations 1996 S.I. 1996/1502
- National Health Service (Wheelchair Charges) Regulations 1996 S.I. 1996/1503
- National Health Service (General Medical Services, Pharmaceutical Services and Charges for Drugs and Appliances) (Scotland) Amendment Regulations 1996 S.I. 1996/1504
- Medicinal Products: Prescription by Nurses etc. Act 1992 (Commencement No. 2) Order 1996 S.I. 1996/1505
- Ancient Monuments (Class Consents) (Scotland) Order 1996 S.I. 1996/1507
- Jobseekers Act 1995 (Commencement No. 3) Order 1996 S.I. 1996/1509
- Housing Benefit, Council Tax Benefit and Supply of Information (Jobseeker's Allowance) (Consequential Amendments) Regulations 1996 S.I. 1996/1510
- Social Security (Back to Work Bonus) (Amendment) Regulations 1996 S.I. 1996/1511
- Fossil Fuel Levy (Scotland) Amendment Regulations 1996 S.I. 1996/1512
- Health and Safety (Consultation with Employees) Regulations 1996 S.I. 1996/1513
- Medicines (Products Other Than Veterinary Drugs) (Prescription Only) Amendment Order 1996 S.I. 1996/1514
- Jobseeker's Allowance (Transitional Provisions) (Amendment) Regulations 1996 S.I. 1996/1515
- Jobseeker's Allowance (Amendment) Regulations 1996 S.I. 1996/1516
- Jobseeker's Allowance and Income Support (General) (Amendment) Regulations 1996 S.I. 1996/1517
- Social Security (Adjudication) Amendment Regulations 1996 S.I. 1996/1518
- Landfill Tax Regulations 1996 S.I. 1996/1527
- Landfill Tax (Qualifying Material) Order 1996 S.I. 1996/1528
- Landfill Tax (Contaminated Land) Order 1996 S.I. 1996/1529
- Criminal Justice and Public Order Act 1994 (Commencement No. 9) Order 1996 (SI 1996/1530)
- Act of Sederunt (Requirements of Writing) 1996 S.I. 1996/1534
- Occupational Pension Schemes (Minimum Funding Requirement and Actuarial Valuations) Regulations 1996 S.I. 1996/1536
- Personal and Occupational Pension Schemes (Protected Rights) Regulations 1996 S.I. 1996/1537
- M11 Motorway (Junction 5, Loughton, Essex, North Facing Slip Roads) Scheme 1996 S.I. 1996/1538
- Food Safety (Fishery Products and Live Bivalve Molluscs and Other Shellfish) (Miscellaneous Amendments) Regulations 1996 S.I. 1996/1547
- Closure of Prisons (H.M. Young Offender Institution Finnamore Wood) Order 1996 S.I. 1996/1551
- Medicines (Advertising) Amendment Regulations 1996 S.I. 1996/1552
- Deregulation (Parking Equipment) Order 1996 S.I. 1996/1553
- Legal Advice and Assistance at Police Stations (Remuneration) (Amendment) (No. 2) Regulations 1996 S.I. 1996/1554
- Legal Aid in Family Proceedings (Remuneration) (Amendment) (No. 2) Regulations 1996 S.I. 1996/1555
- Education (Recognised Awards) (Richmond College) Order 1996 S.I. 1996/1557
- Disclosure of Interests in Shares (Amendment) Regulations 1996 S.I. 1996/1560
- Insider Dealing (Securities and Regulated Markets) (Amendment) Order 1996 S.I. 1996/1561
- Protection of Water Against Agricultural Nitrate Pollution (Scotland) Regulations 1996 S.I. 1996/1564
- Public Telecommunication System Designation (Atlantic Telecommunications Limited) Order 1996 S.I. 1996/1567
- A406 Trunk Road (Hanger Lane, Ealing) (Temporary Prohibition of Traffic) Order 1996 S.I. 1996/1569
- Stock Transfer (Addition and Substitution of Forms) Order 1996 S.I. 1996/1571
- Northern Ireland (Emergency and Prevention of Terrorism Provisions) (Continuance) Order 1996 S.I. 1996/1572
- Deregulation (Gun Barrel Proving) Order 1996 S.I. 1996/1576
- Occupational Pension Schemes (Contracting-out) Amendment Regulations 1996 S.I. 1996/1577
- Local Government Act 1988 (Defined Activities) (Exemption) (Waltham Forest London Borough Council) Order 1996 S.I. 1996/1578
- Local Government Act 1988 (Defined Activities) (Exemption) (London Borough of Bexley) Order 1996 S.I. 1996/1579
- Retirement Benefits Schemes (Restriction on Discretion to Approve) (Excepted Schemes) Regulations 1996 S.I. 1996/1582
- Capital Gains Tax (Pension Funds Pooling Schemes) Regulations 1996 S.I. 1996/1583
- Stamp Duty and Stamp Duty Reserve Tax (Pension Funds Pooling Schemes) Regulations 1996 S.I. 1996/1584
- Income Tax (Pension Funds Pooling Schemes) Regulations 1996 S.I. 1996/1585
- Financial Services Act 1986 (Investment Advertisements) (Exemptions) Order 1996 S.I. 1996/1586
- Financial Services Act 1986 (Exemption) Order 1996 S.I. 1996/1587
- European Primary Medical Qualifications Regulations 1996 S.I. 1996/1591
- Construction (Health, Safety and Welfare) Regulations 1996 S.I. 1996/1592
- Arable Area Payments (Grazing of Bovine Animals on Set-Aside Land) (Temporary Provisions) Regulations 1996 S.I. 1996/1593
- Education (School Performance Information) (England) (Amendment) Regulations 1996 S.I. 1996/1596
- Misuse of Drugs (Amendment) Regulations 1996 S.I. 1996/1597

== 1601–1700 ==
- Education (Teachers) (Amendment) Regulations 1996 S.I. 1996/1603
- Building Societies (Prescribed Contracts) (Amendment) Order 1996 S.I. 1996/1605
- Building Societies (Supplementary Capital) (Amendment) Order 1996 S.I. 1996/1606
- Aviation Security (Air Cargo Agents) (Amendment) Regulations 1996 S.I. 1996/1607
- Criminal Justice and Public Order Act 1994 (Commencement No. 10) Order 1996 (SI 1996/1608)
- Transport and Works Act 1992 (Commencement No. 6) Order 1996 S.I. 1996/1609
- Yorkshire Regional Flood Defence Committee Order 1996 S.I. 1996/1614
- Wessex Regional Flood Defence Committee Order 1996 S.I. 1996/1615
- Severn-Trent Regional Flood Defence Committee Order 1996 S.I. 1996/1616
- Northumbria Regional Flood Defence Committee Order 1996 S.I. 1996/1617
- Anglian Regional Flood Defence Committee Order 1996 S.I. 1996/1618
- Stansted Airport Aircraft Movement Limit (Amendment) Order 1996 S.I. 1996/1619
- Insurance Companies (Taxation of Reinsurance Business) (Amendment) Regulations 1996 S.I. 1996/1621
- A501 Trunk Road (Euston Road, Camden) (Temporary Prohibition of Traffic) Order 1996 S.I. 1996/1622
- Project Work (Miscellaneous Provisions) Order 1996 S.I. 1996/1623
- A12 Trunk Road (Redbridge) (No. 1) Red Route Traffic Order 1996 S.I. 1996/1624
- A501 Trunk Road (Euston Road, Camden) Red Route (Prescribed Routes) Experimental Traffic Order 1996 S.I. 1996/1625
- Registration of Births, Deaths and Marriages (Amendment) Regulations 1996 S.I. 1996/1626
- Whitehaven Harbour Revision Order 1996 S.I. 1996/1627
- Territorial Sea (Amendment) Order 1996 S.I. 1996/1628
- United Nations Arms Embargoes (Former Yugoslavia) (Amendment) Order 1996 S.I. 1996/1629
- General Medical Council (Constitution) Amendment Order 1996 S.I. 1996/1630
- Medical (Professional Performance) Act 1995 (Commencement No. 2) Order 1996 S.I. 1996/1631
- Deregulation and Contracting Out (Northern Ireland) Order 1996 S.I. 1996/1632
- Food Safety (Amendment) (Northern Ireland) Order 1996 S.I. 1996/1633
- Football Spectators (Corresponding Offences in Norway) Order 1996 S.I. 1996/1634
- Football Spectators (Corresponding Offences in the Republic of Ireland) Order 1996 S.I. 1996/1635
- Health and Personal Social Services (Residual Liabilities) (Northern Ireland) Order 1996 S.I. 1996/1636
- Exempt Charities Order 1996 S.I. 1996/1637
- Naval, Military and Air Forces etc. (Disablement and Death) Service Pensions Amendment (No. 2) Order 1996 S.I. 1996/1638
- European Communities (Definition of Treaties) (The Energy Charter Treaty) Order 1996 S.I. 1996/1639
- Education (Fees and Awards) (Amendment) Regulations 1996 S.I. 1996/1640
- Police (Conduct) (Scotland) Regulations 1996 S.I. 1996/1642
- Police (Efficiency) (Scotland) Regulations 1996 S.I. 1996/1643
- Police Appeals Tribunals (Scotland) Rules 1996 S.I. 1996/1644
- Police (Conduct) (Senior Officers) (Scotland) Regulations 1996 S.I. 1996/1645
- Police and Magistrates' Courts Act 1994 (Commencement No. 10 and Savings) (Scotland) Order 1996 S.I. 1996/1646
- Adventure Activities (Enforcing Authority and Licensing Amendment) Regulations 1996 S.I. 1996/1647
- A556(M) Motorway (M6 to M56 Link) and Connecting Roads Scheme 1996 S.I. 1996/1648
- A556(M) Motorway (M6 to M56 Link) Supplementary Connecting Roads Scheme 1996 S.I. 1996/1649
- A556 Trunk Road (Church Farm-Turnpike Wood, Over Tabley) Order 1996 S.I. 1996/1650
- A556 Trunk Road (Turnpike Wood, Over Tabley—A56 Bowdon Roundabout) (Detrunking) Order 1996 S.I. 1996/1651
- Income Tax (Payments on Account) Regulations 1996 S.I. 1996/1654
- Occupational Pension Schemes (Disclosure of Information) Regulations 1996 S.I. 1996/1655
- Work in Compressed Air Regulations 1996 S.I. 1996/1656
- Local Government Act 1988 (Defined Activities) (Exemption) (Gosport Borough Council) Order 1996 S.I. 1996/1657
- Local Government Act 1988 (Defined Activities) (Exemption) (Horsham District Council and Wealden District Council) Order 1996 S.I. 1996/1658
- Value Added Tax (Anti-avoidance (Heating)) Order 1996 S.I. 1996/1661
- Young Offender Institution (Amendment) Rules 1996 S.I. 1996/1662
- Prison (Amendment) Rules 1996 S.I. 1996/1663
- Education (Disability Statements for Further Education Institutions) Regulations 1996 S.I. 1996/1664
- Education (School Performance Information) (Wales) (Amendment) Regulations 1996 S.I. 1996/1665
- Charities (The Royal School for the Blind) Order 1996 S.I. 1996/1667
- Financial Institutions (Prudential Supervision) Regulations 1996 S.I. 1996/1669
- Contracting Out (Functions in relation to the Welfare Food Scheme) Order 1996 S.I. 1996/1670
- Family Proceedings (Amendment) (No. 2) Rules 1996 S.I. 1996/1674
- Pensions Act 1995 (Commencement) (No. 5) Order 1996 S.I. 1996/1675
- Divorce etc. (Pensions) Regulations 1996 S.I. 1996/1676
- Public Telecommunication System Designation (National Transcommunications Limited) Order 1996 S.I. 1996/1677
- Deregulation (Model Appeal Provisions) Order 1996 S.I. 1996/1678
- Occupational Pension Schemes (Indexation)Regulations 1996 S.I. 1996/1679
- Local Government (Discretionary Payments) Regulations 1996 S.I. 1996/1680
- Ayrshire and Arran Community Health Care National Health Service Trust (Establishment) Amendment Order 1996 S.I. 1996/1681
- Deregulation (Improvement of Enforcement Procedures) (Food Safety Act 1990) Order 1996 S.I. 1996/1683
- Runnymede and Spelthorne (Borough Boundaries) Order 1996 S.I. 1996/1684
- Police (Promotion) Regulations 1996 S.I. 1996/1685
- Cattle Passports Order 1996 S.I. 1996/1686
- Local Government Reorganisation (Miscellaneous Provision) (Rush Common) Order 1996 S.I. 1996/1690
- Northern Ireland (Emergency Provisions) Act 1991 (Codes of Practice) (No. 3) Order 1996 S.I. 1996/1698
- Dairy Products (Hygiene) (Amendment) Regulations 1996 S.I. 1996/1699
- Deregulation (Motor Vehicles Tests) Order 1996 S.I. 1996/1700

== 1701–1800 ==
- Kent and Canterbury Hospitals National Health Service Trust (Transfer of Trust Property) Order 1996 S.I. 1996/1701
- St. Helier National Health Service Trust (Transfer of Trust Property) Order 1996 S.I. 1996/1702
- Wandsworth Community Health National Health Service Trust (Transfer of Trust Property) Order 1996 S.I. 1996/1703
- Heathlands Mental Health National Health Service Trust (Transfer of Trust Property) Order 1996 S.I. 1996/1704
- Football Spectators (Seating) Order 1996 S.I. 1996/1706
- North Downs Community Health National Health Service Trust (Transfer of Trust Property) Order 1996 S.I. 1996/1707
- Royal Surrey County and St. LUke's Hospitals National Health Service Trust (Transfer of Trust Property) Order 1996 S.I. 1996/1708
- Mid Essex Hospital Services National Health Service Trust (Transfer of Trust Property) Order 1996 S.I. 1996/1709
- Merton and Sutton Community National Health Service Trust (Transfer of Trust Property) Order 1996 S.I. 1996/1710
- Mid-Sussex National Health Service Trust (Transfer of Trust Property) Order 1996 S.I. 1996/1711
- Food Protection (Emergency Prohibitions) (Oil and Chemical Pollution of Fish and Plants) (Partial Revocation No. 3) Order 1996 S.I. 1996/1712
- Lewisham Hospital National Health Service Trust (Transfer of Trust Property) Order 1996 S.I. 1996/1713
- Nottingham Community Health National Health Service Trust (Transfer of Trust Property) Order 1996 S.I. 1996/1714
- Occupational Pension Schemes (Scheme Administration) Regulations 1996 S.I. 1996/1715
- Criminal Justice Act 1988(Confiscation Orders) Order 1996 S.I. 1996/1716
- National Savings Bank (Amendment) (No. 2) Regulations 1996 S.I. 1996/1724
- Eggs (Marketing Standards) (Amendment) Regulations 1996 S.I. 1996/1725
- Dual-Use and Related Goods (Export Control) (Amendment No. 2) Regulations 1996 S.I. 1996/1736
- Education (School Inspection) (No. 2) (Amendment) Regulations 1996 S.I. 1996/1737
- Deregulation (Industrial and Provident Societies) Order 1996 S.I. 1996/1738
- North Hampshire Hospitals National Health Service Trust (Transfer of Trust Property) Order 1996 S.I. 1996/1739
- Pathfinder National Health Service Trust (Transfer of Trust Property) Order 1996 S.I. 1996/1740
- Protection of Wrecks (Designation No. 1) Order 1996 S.I. 1996/1741
- Beef (Emergency Control) (Revocation) Order 1996 S.I. 1996/1742
- Fresh Meat (Beef Controls) Regulations 1996 S.I. 1996/1743
- Warwickshire College for Agriculture, Horticulture and Equine Studies (Dissolution) Order 1996 S.I. 1996/1744
- Sex Discrimination (Geoffrey Simpson Bequest Modification) Order 1996 S.I. 1996/1745
- Contracting Out (Administration of Civil Service Pension Schemes) Order 1996 S.I. 1996/1746
- Northern Ireland Act 1974 (Interim Period Extension) Order 1996 S.I. 1996/1748
- Merchant Shipping (Mandatory Ship Reporting) Regulations 1996 S.I. 1996/1749
- Local Government Act 1988 (Defined Activities) (Exemption) (Lambeth London Borough Council) Order 1996 S.I. 1996/1750
- Motor Vehicles (Tests) (Amendment) Regulations 1996 S.I. 1996/1751
- Students' Allowances (Scotland) Regulations 1996 S.I. 1996/1754
- National Health Service Trusts (Membership and Procedure) Amendment Regulations 1996 S.I. 1996/1755
- Act of Sederunt (Rules of the Court of Session Amendment No. 3) (Miscellaneous) 1996 S.I. 1996/1756
- Industrial Tribunals (Constitution and Rules of Procedure) (Amendment) Regulations 1996 S.I. 1996/1757
- Industrial Tribunals (Constitution and Rules of Procedure) (Scotland) (Amendment) Regulations 1996 S.I. 1996/1758
- Income-related Benefits Schemes (Miscellaneous Amendments) (No. 2) Regulations 1996 S.I. 1996/1759
- Importation of Animals (Amendment) Order 1996 S.I. 1996/1760
- Winchester School of Art Higher Education Corporation (Dissolution) Order 1996 S.I. 1996/1761
- City of Bristol College (Incorporation) Order 1996 S.I. 1996/1762
- Salford College of Technology Higher Education Corporation (Dissolution) Order 1996 S.I. 1996/1763
- Monkwearmouth College, Sunderland and Wearside College, Sunderland (Dissolution) Order 1996 S.I. 1996/1764
- City of Bristol College (Government) Regulations 1996 S.I. 1996/1765
- Richmond Adult and Community College (Attribution of Surpluses and Deficits) Regulations 1996 S.I. 1996/1766
- Social Security (Disability Living Allowance) Amendment Regulations 1996 S.I. 1996/1767
- Cornwall and Isles of Scilly Learning Disabilities National Health Service Trust (Change of Name) Order 1996 S.I. 1996/1768
- West Lambeth Community Care National Health Service Trust (Change of Name) Order 1996 S.I. 1996/1769
- Radcliffe Infirmary National Health Service Trust (Transfer of Trust Property) Order 1996 S.I. 1996/1770
- Horton General Hospital National Health Service Trust (Transfer of Trust Property) Order 1996 S.I. 1996/1771
- Wireless Telegraphy (Television Licence Fees) (Amendment) (No. 2) Regulations 1996 S.I. 1996/1772
- Oxford Radcliffe Hospital National Health Service Trust (Transfer of Trust Property) Order 1996 S.I. 1996/1773
- Oxfordshire Mental Healthcare National Health Service Trust (Transfer of Trust Property) Order 1996 S.I. 1996/1774
- Oxfordshire Community Health National Health Service Trust (Transfer of Trust Property) Order 1996 S.I. 1996/1775
- Oxfordshire Learning Disability National Health Service Trust (Transfer of Trust Property) Order 1996 S.I. 1996/1776
- Oxfordshire Ambulance National Health Service Trust (Transfer of Trust Property) Order 1996 S.I. 1996/1777
- Family Proceedings (Amendment) (No. 3) Rules 1996 S.I. 1996/1778
- Income Tax (Interest on Quoted Eurobonds) Regulations 1996 S.I. 1996/1779
- Income Tax (Paying and Collecting Agents) Regulations 1996 S.I. 1996/1780
- Double Taxation Relief (Taxes on Income) (United States of America Dividends) (Amendment) Regulations 1996 S.I. 1996/1781
- Double Taxation Relief (Taxes on Income) (Canadian Dividends and Interest) (Amendment) Regulations 1996 S.I. 1996/1782
- Grants for Pre-school Education (Scotland) Regulations 1996 S.I. 1996/1783
- Plant Health Fees (Scotland) Regulations 1996 S.I. 1996/1784
- Private Crossings (Signs and Barriers) Regulations 1996 S.I. 1996/1786
- War Pensions Committees (Amendment) Regulations 1996 S.I. 1996/1790
- A47 Trunk Road (Hardwick Roundabout Flyover and Slip Roads) Order 1996 S.I. 1996/1800

== 1801–1900 ==
- A47 Trunk Road (Hardwick Roundabout to North Runcton) (Detrunking) Order 1996 S.I. 1996/1801
- Birmingham-Great Yarmouth Trunk Road (King's Lynn Southern Bypass) Order 1971 Partial Revocation Order 1996 S.I. 1996/1802
- Child Benefit, Child Support and Social Security (Miscellaneous Amendments) Regulations 1996 S.I. 1996/1803
- St Mary's Music School (Aided Places) Amendment Regulations 1996 S.I. 1996/1807
- Education (Assisted Places) (Scotland) Amendment Regulations 1996 S.I. 1996/1808
- City of Salford (Pomona Bridge) Scheme 1995 Confirmation Instrument 1996 S.I. 1996/1809
- Plant Breeders' Rights (Applications inDesignated Countries) Order 1996 S.I. 1996/1811
- Education (Student Loans) Regulations 1996 S.I. 1996/1812
- Local Government Act 1988 (Defined Activities) (Exemption) (Kettering Borough Council) Order 1996 S.I. 1996/1813
- Local Authorities (Goods and Services) (Public Bodies) (Trunk Roads) (No. 2) Order 1996 S.I. 1996/1814
- Merchant Shipping (Navigational Warnings)Regulations 1996 S.I. 1996/1815
- Education (School Teachers' Pay and Conditions) (No. 2) Order 1996 S.I. 1996/1816
- Manufactured Overseas Dividends (French Indemnity Payments) Regulations 1996 S.I. 1996/1826
- South Tynedale Railway (Light Railway) Order 1996 (SI 1996/1829)
- A1 Motorway (North of Leeming to Scotch Corner Section and Connecting Roads) Scheme 1996 S.I. 1996/1830
- A1 Trunk Road (Lengths of A1 Carriageway between Catterick and Barton) (Detrunking) Order 1996 S.I. 1996/1831
- Education (Funding for Teacher Training) Designation Order 1996 S.I. 1996/1832
- Disability Discrimination (Services and Premises) Regulations 1996 S.I. 1996/1836
- A13 Trunk Road (Tower Hamlets) Red Route (No. 2) Experimental Traffic Order 1996 S.I. 1996/1841
- Nottingham Healthcare National Health Service Trust (Transfer of Trust Property) (No. 2) Order 1996 S.I. 1996/1842
- Pensions Act 1995 (Commencement No. 6) Order 1996 S.I. 1996/1843
- Building Societies Act 1986 (Continuance of section 41) Order 1996 S.I. 1996/1844
- A21 Trunk Road (Lamberhurst Bypass) Order 1996 S.I. 1996/1845
- A21 Trunk Road (Lamberhurst Bypass Detrunking) Order 1996 S.I. 1996/1846
- Occupational Pension Schemes (Transfer Values) Regulations 1996 S.I. 1996/1847
- Pensions Act 1995 (Commencement No. 6) Order 1996 S.I. 1996/1853
- National Savings Bank (Investment Deposits) (Limits) (Amendment) Order 1996 S.I. 1996/1854
- Anthrax (Amendment) Order 1996 S.I. 1996/1855
- Jobseeker's Allowance (Pilot Scheme) (Amendment) Regulations 1996 S.I. 1996/1856
- Local Government and Housing Act 1989 (Commencement No. 18) Order 1996 S.I. 1996/1857
- North Tees Health National Health Service Trust (Transfer of Trust Property) Order 1996 S.I. 1996/1858
- Police and Criminal Evidence Act 1984 (Application to Customs and Excise) (Amendment) Order 1996 S.I. 1996/1860
- Offshore Installations (Safety Zones) (No. 5) Order 1996 S.I. 1996/1862
- Cheshire (Boroughs of Halton and Warrington) (Structural Change) Order 1996 S.I. 1996/1863
- Deregulation (Wireless Telegraphy) Order 1996 S.I. 1996/1864
- Devon (City of Plymouth and Borough of Torbay) (Structural Change) Order 1996 S.I. 1996/1865
- Shropshire (District of The Wrekin) (Structural Change) Order 1996 S.I. 1996/1866
- Hereford and Worcester (Structural, Boundary and Electoral Changes) Order 1996 S.I. 1996/1867
- Lancashire (Boroughs of Blackburn and Blackpool) (Structural Change) Order 1996 S.I. 1996/1868
- Essex (Boroughs of Colchester, Southend-on-Sea and Thurrock and District of Tendring) (Structural, Boundary and Electoral Changes) Order 1996 S.I. 1996/1875
- Kent (Borough of Gillingham and City of Rochester upon Medway) (Structural Change) Order 1996 S.I. 1996/1876
- Nottinghamshire (City of Nottingham) (Structural Change) Order 1996 S.I. 1996/1877
- Cambridgeshire (City of Peterborough) (Structural, Boundary and Electoral Changes) Order 1996 S.I. 1996/1878
- Berkshire (Structural Change) Order 1996 S.I. 1996/1879
- Local Authorities (Contracting Out of Tax Billing, Collection and Enforcement Functions) Order 1996 S.I. 1996/1880
- A1 Trunk Road (Islington) Red Route Traffic Order 1993 Variation Order 1996 S.I. 1996/1881
- Local Government Changes For England (Direct Labour and Service Organisations) (Amendment) Regulations 1996 S.I. 1996/1882
- Local Authorities (Contracting Out of Investment Functions) Order 1996 S.I. 1996/1883
- Food Protection (Emergency Prohibitions) (Paralytic Shellfish Poisoning) Order 1996 S.I. 1996/1887
- Local Government Act 1992 (Commencement No. 5) Order 1996 S.I. 1996/1888
- Income Support (General) (Standard Interest Rate Amendment) (No. 2) Regulations 1996 S.I. 1996/1889
- A13 Trunk Road (Tower Hamlets) Red Route Traffic Order 1996 S.I. 1996/1891
- A1400 Trunk Road (Redbridge) Red Route Traffic Order 1996 S.I. 1996/1892
- A12 Trunk Road (Redbridge) Red Route Traffic Order 1996 S.I. 1996/1893
- A13 Trunk Road (Havering) Red Route Traffic Order 1996 S.I. 1996/1894
- A406 Trunk Road (Newham and Barking and Dagenham) Red Route Traffic Order 1996 S.I. 1996/1895
- A13 Trunk Road (Barking and Dagenham) Red Route Traffic Order 1996 S.I. 1996/1896
- Further and Higher Education Act 1992 (Commencement No. 3) Order 1996 S.I. 1996/1897
- Welsh Language Schemes (Public Bodies) Order 1996 S.I. 1996/1898
- Local Government (Publication of Staffing Information) (Wales) Regulations 1996 S.I. 1996/1899
- Scottish Transport Group (Pension Schemes) Order 1996 S.I. 1996/1900

== 1901–2000 ==
- Divorce etc. (Pensions) (Scotland) Regulations 1996 S.I. 1996/1901
- Deregulation (Building) (Initial Notices and Final Certificates) Order 1996 S.I. 1996/1905
- Building (Approved Inspectors etc.) (Amendment) Regulations 1996 S.I. 1996/1906
- Inshore Fishing (Monofilament Gill Nets) (Scotland) Order 1996 S.I. 1996/1907
- Community Trade Mark Regulations 1996 S.I. 1996/1908
- Insolvent Companies (Reports on Conduct of Directors) Rules 1996 S.I. 1996/1909
- Insolvent Companies (Reports on Conduct of Directors) (Scotland) Rules 1996 S.I. 1996/1910
- Education (Grant-maintained and Grant-maintained Special Schools) (Finance) (Wales) (Amendment) (No. 2) Regulations 1996 S.I. 1996/1911
- European Communities (Designation) (No. 2) Order 1996 S.I. 1996/1912
- Ministerial and other Salaries Order 1996 S.I. 1996/1913
- Parliamentary Commissioner Order 1996 S.I. 1996/1914
- Consular Fees Order 1996 S.I. 1996/1915
- Outer Space Act 1986 (Gibraltar) Order 1996 S.I. 1996/1916
- Appropriation (No. 2) (Northern Ireland) Order 1996 S.I. 1996/1917
- Education (Student Loans) (Northern Ireland) Order 1996 S.I. 1996/1918
- Employment Rights (Northern Ireland) Order 1996 S.I. 1996/1919
- Explosives (Amendment) (Northern Ireland) Order 1996 S.I. 1996/1920
- Industrial Tribunals (Northern Ireland) Order 1996 S.I. 1996/1921
- Parliamentary Constituencies (England) (Miscellaneous Changes) Order 1996 S.I. 1996/1922
- Personal Social Services (Direct Payments) (Northern Ireland) Order 1996 S.I. 1996/1923
- Maximum Number of Stipendiary Magistrates Order 1996 S.I. 1996/1924
- Recovery Abroad of Maintenance (Convention Countries) Order 1996 S.I. 1996/1925
- European Parliamentary Constituencies (Scotland) Order 1996 S.I. 1996/1926
- Social Security (Malta) Order 1996 S.I. 1996/1927
- Social Security (Reciprocal Agreements) Order 1996 S.I. 1996/1928
- Motor Vehicles (International Circulation) (Amendment) Order 1996 S.I. 1996/1929
- Local Authorities (Armorial Bearings) (No. 2) (Wales) Order 1996 S.I. 1996/1930
- European Communities (Definition of Treaties) (Euro-Mediterranean Agreement Establishing an Association between the European Communities and their Member States and the Republic of Tunisia) Order 1996 S.I. 1996/1931
- Exempt Charities (No. 2) Order 1996 S.I. 1996/1932
- Exempt Charities (No. 3) Order 1996 S.I. 1996/1933
- Education (School Inspection) (Wales) (No. 2) (Amendment) Regulations 1996 S.I. 1996/1934
- Education (Reorganisation in Inner London) (Compensation) (Amendment and Modification) Regulations 1996 S.I. 1996/1935
- Education (School Information) (Wales) (Amendment) Regulations 1996 S.I. 1996/1936
- A449 and A456 Trunk Roads (Kidderminster, Blakedown and Hagley Bypass and Slip Roads) Order 1996 S.I. 1996/1937
- Community Service by Offenders (Hours of Work) (Scotland) Order 1996 S.I. 1996/1938
- Sheep Annual Premium and Suckler Cow Premium Quotas (Amendment) Regulations 1996 S.I. 1996/1939
- Plant Protection Products (Amendment) Regulations 1996 S.I. 1996/1940
- Specified Bovine Material (No. 3) Order 1996 S.I. 1996/1941
- Trade Marks (Fees) Rules 1996 S.I. 1996/1942
- Transport Act 1982 (Commencement No. 7 and Transitional Provisions) Order 1996 S.I. 1996/1943
- Income-related Benefits Schemes and Social Fund (Miscellaneous Amendments) Regulations 1996 S.I. 1996/1944
- Child Support (Miscellaneous Amendments) Regulations 1996 S.I. 1996/1945
- Harbour Works (Assessment of Environmental Effects) (Amendment) Regulations 1996 S.I. 1996/1946
- Food Protection (Emergency Prohibitions) (Oil and Chemical Pollution of Fish and Plants) (Partial Revocation No. 4) Order 1996 S.I. 1996/1957
- County Council of Norfolk (Reconstruction of Stow Bridge) Scheme 1995 Confirmation Instrument 1996 S.I. 1996/1960
- Department of Transport (Fees) (Amendment) Order 1996 S.I. 1996/1961
- Environmentally Sensitive Areas (Machair of the Uists and Benbecula, Barra and Vatersay) Designation (Amendment) Order 1996 S.I. 1996/1962
- Environmentally Sensitive Areas (Cairngorms Straths) Designation (Amendment) Order 1996 S.I. 1996/1963
- Environmentally Sensitive Areas (Central Borders) Designation (Amendment) Order 1996 S.I. 1996/1964
- Environmentally Sensitive Areas (Shetland Islands) Designation (Amendment) Order 1996 S.I. 1996/1965
- Environmentally Sensitive Areas (Argyll Islands) Designation (Amendment) Order 1996 S.I. 1996/1966
- Environmentally Sensitive Areas (Stewartry) Designation (Amendment) Order 1996 S.I. 1996/1967
- Environmentally Sensitive Areas (Western Southern Uplands) Designation (Amendment) Order 1996 S.I. 1996/1968
- Environmentally Sensitive Areas (Central Southern Uplands) Designation (Amendment) Order 1996 S.I. 1996/1969
- Scottish Examination Board (Amendment No. 2) Regulations 1996 S.I. 1996/1970
- Colleges of Education (Local Government Re-organisation Consequential Provisions) (Scotland) Order 1996 S.I. 1996/1971
- Driving Licences (Community Driving Licence) Regulations 1996 S.I. 1996/1974
- Occupational Pension Schemes (Requirement to obtain Audited Accounts and a Statement from the Auditor) Regulations 1996 S.I. 1996/1975
- Occupational Pension Schemes (Pensions Compensation Board Limit on Borrowing) Regulations 1996 S.I. 1996/1976
- Occupational Pension Schemes (Mixed Benefit Contracted-out Schemes) Regulations 1996 S.I. 1996/1977
- Local Authorities (Charges for Overseas Assistance and Public Path Orders) Regulations 1996 S.I. 1996/1978
- Pneumoconiosis etc. (Workers' Compensation) (Payment of Claims) Amendment Regulations 1996 S.I. 1996/1979
- Road Traffic (Driving Instruction by Disabled Persons) Act 1993 (Commencement) Order 1996 S.I. 1996/1980
- Tyne Riverside Enterprise Zones (North Tyneside) (Designation) (No. 2) Order 1996 S.I. 1996/1981
- Housing Accommodation and Homelessness (Persons subject to Immigration Control) Order 1996 S.I. 1996/1982
- Motor Cars (Driving Instruction) (Amendment) Regulations 1996 S.I. 1996/1983
- Parochial Fees Order 1996 S.I. 1996/1994
- Chessington Computer Centre Trading Fund (Revocation) Order 1996 S.I. 1996/1995
- Disability Discrimination (Guidance and Code Of Practice) (Appointed Day) Order 1996 S.I. 1996/1996
- Motor Vehicles (Driving Licences) (Amendment) (No. 4) Regulations 1996 S.I. 1996/1997

== 2001–2100 ==
- Mines (Substances Hazardous to Health) Regulations 1996 S.I. 1996/2001
- Beef (Marketing Payment) Regulations 1996 S.I. 1996/2005
- Income-related Benefits (Montserrat) Regulations 1996 S.I. 1996/2006
- Bovine Spongiform Encephalopathy Order 1996 S.I. 1996/2007
- Vehicle Excise Duty (Fee for Temporary Licences) Regulations 1996 S.I. 1996/2008
- Local Government Changes for England (Sheriffs) Order 1996 S.I. 1996/2009
- Road Traffic (Permitted Parking Area and Special Parking Area) (County of Hampshire, City of Winchester) (Amendment) Order 1996 S.I. 1996/2017
- Special Waste (Amendment) Regulations 1996 S.I. 1996/2019
- Nursery Education and Grant-Maintained Schools Act 1996 (Commencement No. 1) Order 1996 S.I. 1996/2022
- Salford Royal Hospitals National Health Service Trust (Transfer of Trust Property) Order 1996 S.I. 1996/2032
- Manchester Children's Hospitals National Health Service Trust (Transfer of Trust Property) Order 1996 S.I. 1996/2033
- Grimsby Health National Health Service Trust(Change of Name) Order 1996 S.I. 1996/2034
- Education (Assisted Places) (Incidental Expenses) (Amendment) Regulations 1996 S.I. 1996/2035
- Education (Grants) (Music, Ballet and Choir Schools) (Amendment) Regulations 1996 S.I. 1996/2036
- Harwich Parkeston Quay Harbour Revision Order 1996 S.I. 1996/2037
- Control of Pollution (Silage, Slurry and Agricultural Fuel Oil) (Amendment) Regulations 1996 S.I. 1996/2044
- Postal Privilege (Suspension) Order 1996 S.I. 1996/2045
- Dartford-Thurrock Crossing Tolls Order 1996 S.I. 1996/2046
- Dartford-Thurrock Crossing (Amendment) Regulations 1996 S.I. 1996/2047
- Housing Act 1996 (Commencement No. 1) Order 1996 S.I. 1996/2048
- Education (Grant-maintained Schools) (Initial Governing Instruments) (Amendment) Regulations 1996 S.I. 1996/2049
- Education (School Government) (Amendment) Regulations 1996 S.I. 1996/2050
- National Health Service (General Dental Services) Amendment (No. 2) Regulations 1996 S.I. 1996/2051
- Registration of Births, Deaths and Marriages (Accounting) Amendment Regulations 1996 S.I. 1996/2052
- Asylum and Immigration Act 1996 ( Commencement No. 1) Order 1996 S.I. 1996/2053
- Chemical Weapons Act 1996 (Commencement) Order 1996 S.I. 1996/2054
- National Health Service (General Dental Services) (Scotland) Amendment (No. 2) Regulations 1996 S.I. 1996/2060
- Road Vehicles (Construction and Use) (Amendment) (No. 3) Regulations 1996 S.I. 1996/2064
- Immigration (Transit Visa) (Amendment) Order 1996 S.I. 1996/2065
- Local Government Act 1988 (Defined Activities) (Exemptions) (Bedford Borough Council and Suffolk Coastal District Council) Order 1996 S.I. 1996/2068
- National Health Service (Functions of Health Authorities in England) (General Dental Services Incentive Schemes) Regulations 1996 S.I. 1996/2069
- Asylum Appeals (Procedure) Rules 1996 S.I. 1996/2070
- Offensive Weapons Act 1996 (Commencement No. 1) Order 1996 S.I. 1996/2071
- Health and Safety at Work etc. Act 1974 (Application to Environmentally Hazardous Substances) Regulations 1996 S.I. 1996/2075
- Education (London Residuary Body) (Property Transfer) (Amendment) Order 1996 S.I. 1996/2082
- Education (National Curriculum) (Exceptions) Regulations 1996 S.I. 1996/2083
- Brunel College of Arts and Technology and South Bristol College (Dissolution) Order 1996 S.I. 1996/2084
- Road Vehicles (Construction And Use) (Amendment) (No. 4) Regulations 1996 S.I. 1996/2085
- Nursery Education Regulations 1996 S.I. 1996/2086
- Education (Pupil Referral Units) (Application of Enactments) (Amendment) Regulations 1996 S.I. 1996/2087
- Education (Mandatory Awards) (Amendment)Regulations 1996 S.I. 1996/2088
- Carriage of Dangerous Goods by Rail Regulations 1996 S.I. 1996/2089
- Packaging, Labelling and Carriage of Radioactive Material by Rail Regulations 1996 S.I. 1996/2090
- Fire Services (Appointments and Promotion) (Scotland) Amendment Regulations 1996 S.I. 1996/2091
- Carriage of Dangerous Goods (Classification, Packaging and Labelling) and Use of Transportable Pressure Receptacles Regulations 1996 S.I. 1996/2092
- Carriage of Explosives by Road Regulations 1996 S.I. 1996/2093
- Carriage of Dangerous Goods by Road (Driver Training) Regulations 1996 S.I. 1996/2094
- Carriage of Dangerous Goods by Road Regulations 1996 S.I. 1996/2095
- Fire Services (Appointments and Promotion) (Amendment) Regulations 1996 S.I. 1996/2096
- Fresh Meat (Beef Controls) (No. 2) Regulations 1996 S.I. 1996/2097
- Value Added Tax (Amendment) (No. 4) Regulations 1996 S.I. 1996/2098
- Insurance Premium Tax (Amendment) Regulations 1996 S.I. 1996/2099
- Landfill Tax (Amendment) Regulations 1996 S.I. 1996/2100

== 2101–2200 ==
- AEA Technology plc (Capital Allowances) Order 1996 S.I. 1996/2101
- Deregulation (Insurance Companies Act 1982) Order 1996 S.I. 1996/2102
- Ilfracombe Harbour Revision Order 1996 S.I. 1996/2103
- Environmentally Sensitive Areas (Upper Thames Tributaries) Designation (Amendment) Order 1996 S.I. 1996/2105
- Environmentally Sensitive Areas (Blackdown Hills) Designation (Amendment) Order 1996 S.I. 1996/2106
- Environmentally Sensitive Areas (Cotswold Hills) Designation (Amendment) Order 1996 S.I. 1996/2107
- Environmentally Sensitive Areas (Essex Coast) Designation (Amendment) Order 1996 S.I. 1996/2108
- Environmentally Sensitive Areas (Shropshire Hills) Designation (Amendment) Order 1996 S.I. 1996/2109
- Environmentally Sensitive Areas (Dartmoor) Designation (Amendment) Order 1996 S.I. 1996/2110
- Education (Assisted Places) (Amendment) Regulations 1996 S.I. 1996/2113
- Education (National Curriculum) (Assessment Arrangements for the Core Subjects) (Key Stage 1) (England) (Amendment) Order 1996 S.I. 1996/2114
- Education (National Curriculum) (Assessment Arrangements for the Core Subjects) (Key Stage 2) (England) (Amendment) Order 1996 S.I. 1996/2115
- Education (National Curriculum) (Key Stage 3 Assessment Arrangements) (England) Order 1996 S.I. 1996/2116
- Broadcasting Act 1996 (Commencement No. 1 and Transitional Provisions) Order 1996 S.I. 1996/2120
- Local Authorities (Capital Finance) (Amendment No. 2) Regulations 1996 S.I. 1996/2121
- General Medical Council (Constitution of Fitness to Practise Committees) Rules Order of Council 1996 S.I. 1996/2125
- Closure of Prisons (H.M. Prison Oxford) Order 1996 S.I. 1996/2126
- Asylum and Immigration Act 1996 (Commencement No. 2) Order 1996 S.I. 1996/2127
- Merchant Shipping (Prevention of Pollution) (Limits) Regulations 1996 S.I. 1996/2128
- M62 (East) To M606 Link And Connecting Roads Scheme 1996 S.I. 1996/2130
- Personal and Occupational Pension Schemes (Preservation of Benefit and Perpetuities) (Amendments) Regulations 1996 S.I. 1996/2131
- Guarantee Payments (Exemption) (No. 30) Order 1996 S.I. 1996/2132
- Chester–Bangor Trunk Road (A55) (Pont Dafydd to Waen Improvement, Detrunking) Order 1996 S.I. 1996/2142
- Immigration (Restricted Right of Appeal Against Deportation) (Exemption) (Amendment) Order 1996 S.I. 1996/2145
- Police Act 1996 (Scotland) Order 1996 S.I. 1996/2146
- Act of Adjournal (Criminal Procedure Rules Amendment) (Miscellaneous) 1996 S.I. 1996/2147
- Act of Sederunt (Civil Legal Aid Rules) (Amendment) 1996 S.I. 1996/2148
- Act of Sederunt (Mental Health Rules) 1996 S.I. 1996/2149
- Pensions Act 1995 (Commencement No. 6 : S.I. 1996/1853 : C.38) (Amendment) Order 1996 S.I. 1996/2150
- Merchant Shipping (Prevention of Oil Pollution) Regulations 1996 S.I. 1996/2154
- A501 Trunk Road (Camden and Westminster) Red Route Experimental Traffic Order 1996 S.I. 1996/2155
- Occupational Pension Schemes (Payments to Employers) Regulations 1996 S.I. 1996/2156
- A4 Trunk Road (Hillingdon) (Prescribed Routes) Order 1996 S.I. 1996/2157
- M66 Motorway (Bury Easterly Bypass Northern Section) (Junction 2 Southbound Off-Slip) (Detrunking) Order 1996 S.I. 1996/2158
- M66 Motorway (Bury Easterly Bypass Northern Section) And Connecting Roads Scheme 1973 (Variation) Scheme 1996 S.I. 1996/2159
- A501 Trunk Road (Marylebone Road/Upper Harley Street, Westminster) (Temporary Prohibition of Turns) Traffic Order 1996 S.I. 1996/2162
- Agricultural Holdings (Units of Production) Order 1996 S.I. 1996/2163
- A205 Trunk Road (Richmond and Wandsworth) Red Route Traffic Order 1996 S.I. 1996/2164
- A41 Trunk Road (Camden and Westminster) Red Route (Bus Lanes) Experimental Traffic Order 1996 S.I. 1996/2165
- A41 Trunk Road (Westminster) Red Route Experimental Traffic Order 1996 S.I. 1996/2166
- Act of Sederunt (Family Proceedings in the Sheriff Court) 1996 S.I. 1996/2167
- Act of Sederunt (Rules of the Court of Session Amendment No. 4) (Miscellaneous) 1996 S.I. 1996/2168
- Local Government Changes for England (Collection Fund Surpluses and Deficits) (Amendment) Regulations 1996 S.I. 1996/2177
- Local Government Pension Scheme (Crown Prosecution Service) (Transfer of Pension Rights) Regulations 1996 S.I. 1996/2180
- County Court (Amendment) Rules 1996 S.I. 1996/2181
- Contracting Out of Functions (Court Staff) Order 1996 S.I. 1996/2182
- Act of Sederunt (Chancery Procedure Rules) 1996 S.I. 1996/2184
- Advanced Television Services (Industrial Property Rights) Regulations 1996 S.I. 1996/2185
- Goods Vehicles (Licensing of Operators) (Temporary Use in Great Britain) Regulations 1996 S.I. 1996/2186
- Sheriff Court Districts (Alteration of Boundaries) Amendment Order 1996 S.I. 1996/2192
- Animal Test Certificates Regulations 1996 S.I. 1996/2194
- Medicines (Exemptions from Licences) (Revocation) Order 1996 S.I. 1996/2195
- Medicines (Products for Animal Use — Fees) (Amendment) Regulations 1996 S.I. 1996/2196
- Medicines (Exemptions from Animal Test Certificates) (Revocation) Order 1996 S.I. 1996/2197
- Assured and Protected Tenancies (Lettings to Students) (Amendment) (No. 2) Regulations 1996 S.I. 1996/2198
- EC Competition Law (Articles 88 and 89) Enforcement Regulations 1996 S.I. 1996/2199

== 2201–2300 ==
- City of Manchester (Mancunian Way A57(M)) (Chester Road Roundabout) Motorway Scheme 1995 Confirmation Instrument 1996 S.I. 1996/2201
- Spring Traps Approval (Scotland) Order 1996 S.I. 1996/2202
- Children (Scotland) Act 1995 (Commencement No. 2 and Transitional Provisions) Order 1996 S.I. 1996/2203
- Jobseekers Act 1995 (Commencement No. 4) Order 1996 S.I. 1996/2208
- Housing Act 1996 (Commencement No. 2 and Savings) Order 1996 S.I. 1996/2212
- Noise Act 1996 (Commencement No. 1) Order 1996 S.I. 1996/2219
- Housing (Change of Landlord) (Payment of Disposal Cost by Instalments) (Amendment No. 3) Regulations 1996 S.I. 1996/2228
- Deregulation (Slaughterhouses Act 1974 and Slaughter of Animals (Scotland) Act 1980) Order 1996 S.I. 1996/2235
- Education (Transfer of Functions Relating to Grant-maintained Schools) Order 1996 S.I. 1996/2247
- Scottish Qualifications Authority (Establishment) (Scotland) Order 1996 S.I. 1996/2248
- Scottish Qualifications Authority (Transitional Provisions) (Scotland) Order 1996 S.I. 1996/2249
- Education (Scotland) Act 1996 (Commencement) Order 1996 S.I. 1996/2250
- Building Standards (Scotland) Amendment Regulations 1996 S.I. 1996/2251
- Cattle Passports (Fees) Order 1996 S.I. 1996/2255
- Social Landlords (Permissible Additional Purposes or Objects) Order 1996 S.I. 1996/2256
- Education (National Curriculum) (Exceptions) (Wales) (Revocation) Regulations 1996 S.I. 1996/2259
- Bridgend and District National Health Service Trust (Transfer of Trust Property) Order 1996 S.I. 1996/2260
- North Glamorgan National Health Service Trust (Transfer of Trust Property) Order 1996 S.I. 1996/2261
- Sexual Offences (Conspiracy and Incitement) Act 1996 (Commencement) Order 1996 S.I. 1996/2262
- Special Trustees for the Middlesex Hospital(Transfer of Trust Property) Order 1996 S.I. 1996/2263
- Heads of Sheep and Goats Order 1996 S.I. 1996/2264
- Bovine Products (Despatch to other Member States) Regulations 1996 S.I. 1996/2265
- Teachers' Superannuation (Amendment) Regulations 1996 S.I. 1996/2269
- Local Government (Access to Information) (Scotland) Order 1996 S.I. 1996/2278
- Teachers' Superannuation (Provision of Information and Administrative Expenses etc.) Regulations 1996 S.I. 1996/2282
- Channel Tunnel (International Arrangements) (Amendment) Order 1996 S.I. 1996/2283
- Road Traffic (Special Parking Area) (City of Westminster) (Amendment) Order 1996 S.I. 1996/2284
- National Health Service (Transitional Functions of Health Authorities) (Administra tion Arrangements) Regulations 1996 S.I. 1996/2285
- Cider and Perry (Amendment) Regulations 1996 S.I. 1996/2287
- South and East Wales Ambulance National Health Service Trust (Establishment) (Amendment) Order 1996 S.I. 1996/2288
- Contracting Out (Functions relating to Wireless Telegraphy) Order 1996 S.I. 1996/2290
- Plant Health (Fees) (Forestry) (Great Britain) Regulations 1996 S.I. 1996/2291

== 2301–2400 ==
- Education (Grant-maintained Special Schools) (Amendment) (No. 2) Regulations 1996 S.I. 1996/2303
- Offshore Installations (Safety Zones) (No. 6) Order 1996 S.I. 1996/2304
- Rent Assessment Committee (England and Wales) (Leasehold Valuation Tribunal) (Amendment) Regulations 1996 S.I. 1996/2305
- Social Security (Claims and Payments and Adjudication) Amendment Regulations 1996 S.I. 1996/2306
- Legal Aid in Criminal and Care Proceedings (General) (Amendment) (No. 4) Regulations 1996 S.I. 1996/2307
- Legal Advice and Assistance (Amendment) (No. 3) Regulations 1996 S.I. 1996/2308
- Civil Legal Aid (Assessment of Resources) (Amendment) (No. 3) Regulations 1996 S.I. 1996/2309
- Health Authorities Act 1995 (Transitional Provisions) Amendment Order 1996 (SI 1996/2310)
- Hydrocarbon Oil (Payment of Rebates) Regulations 1996 S.I. 1996/2313
- Finance Act 1996, section 5(6), (Appointed Day)Order 1996 S.I. 1996/2314
- Finance Act 1994, sections 244 and 245, (Commencement) Order 1996 S.I. 1996/2316
- Teachers (Compensation for Premature Retirement and Redundancy) (Scotland) Regulations 1996 S.I. 1996/2317
- National Health Service (General Ophthalmic Services) Amendment (No. 2) Regulations 1996 S.I. 1996/2320
- Housing Act 1996 (Consequential Provisions) Order 1996 S.I. 1996/2325
- Housing Benefit (Permitted Totals) (Amendment) Order 1996 S.I. 1996/2326
- Child Benefit (General) Amendment Regulations 1996 S.I. 1996/2327
- National Health Service (Optical Charges and Payments) Amendment (No. 2) Regulations 1996 S.I. 1996/2328
- Road Vehicles (Construction and Use) (Amendment) (No. 5) Regulations 1996 S.I. 1996/2329
- Motor Vehicles (Type Approval) (Great Britain) (Amendment) Regulations 1996 S.I. 1996/2330
- Motor Vehicles (Type Approval for Goods Vehicles) (Amendment) Regulations 1996 S.I. 1996/2331
- A3 Trunk Road (Kingston upon Thames) Red Route Traffic Order 1996 S.I. 1996/2332
- A3 Trunk Road (Merton) Red Route (Clearway) Traffic Order 1996 S.I. 1996/2333
- A3 Trunk Road (Merton) Red Route Traffic Order 1996 S.I. 1996/2334
- A205 Trunk Road (Hounslow) Red Route (Bus Lanes) Experimental Traffic Order 1996 S.I. 1996/2335
- A205 Trunk Road (Hounslow) Red Route Traffic Order 1996 S.I. 1996/2336
- Education (National Curriculum) (Key Stage 3 Assessment Arrangements) (Wales) Order 1996 S.I. 1996/2337
- A3 Trunk Road (Wandsworth) Red Route (Clearway) Traffic Order 1996 S.I. 1996/2338
- A3 Trunk Road (Kingston upon Thames) Red Route (Clearway) Traffic Order 1996 S.I. 1996/2339
- Criminal Procedure and Investigations Act 1996 (Appointed Day No. 1) Order 1996 S.I. 1996/2343
- Social Security (Jobseeker's Allowance Consequential Amendments) (Deductions) Regulations 1996 S.I. 1996/2344
- Stamp Duty (Production of Documents) (Northern Ireland) Regulations 1996 S.I. 1996/2348
- Employment Protection (Recoupment of Jobseeker's Allowance and Income Support) Regulations 1996 S.I. 1996/2349
- Housing Grants, Construction and Regeneration Act 1996 (Commencement No. 1) Order 1996 S.I. 1996/2352
- National Health Service (General Ophthalmic Services) Amendment (No. 2) Regulations 1996 S.I. 1996/2353
- National Health Service (Optical Charges and Payments) (Scotland) Amendment (No. 2) Regulations 1996 S.I. 1996/2354
- Food Protection (Emergency Prohibitions) (Oil and Chemical Pollution of Fish and Plants) (Partial Revocation No. 5) Order 1996 S.I. 1996/2355
- Community Health Services, Southern Derbyshire National Health Service Trust (Transfer of Trust Property) Order 1996 S.I. 1996/2359
- Solihull Health Authority (Transfer of Trust Property) Order 1996 S.I. 1996/2360
- National Health Service (Travelling Expenses and Remission of Charges) Amendment (No. 3) Regulations 1996 S.I. 1996/2362
- Social Security (Credits and Contributions) (Jobseeker's Allowance Consequential and Miscellaneous Amendments) Regulations 1996 S.I. 1996/2367
- Tenants' Rights of First Refusal (Amendment)Regulations 1996 S.I. 1996/2371
- European Communities (Recognition of Professional Qualifications) (Second General System) Regulations 1996 S.I. 1996/2374
- Social Security and Child Support (Jobseeker's Allowance) (Transitional Provisions) (Amendment) Regulations 1996 S.I. 1996/2378
- Income Tax (Employments) (Amendment No. 4) Regulations 1996 S.I. 1996/2381
- North Hampshire, Loddon Community National Health Service Trust (Transfer of Trust Property) Order 1996 S.I. 1996/2384
- Teddington Memorial Hospital National Health Service Trust (Transfer of Trust Property) Order 1996 S.I. 1996/2385
- A1400 Trunk Road (Southend Road, Redbridge) (Prohibition of Right Turn and U-Turns) Order 1996 S.I. 1996/2387
- National Health Service (Travelling Expenses and Remission of Charges) (Scotland) Amendment (No. 2) Regulations 1996 S.I. 1996/2391
- Moorland (Livestock Extensification) (Amendment) Regulations 1996 S.I. 1996/2393
- Rural Development Grants (Agriculture) (Amendment) Regulations 1996 S.I. 1996/2394
- Deregulation (Still-Birth and Death Registration) Order 1996 S.I. 1996/2395
- Taxation of Benefits under Pilot Schemes (Earnings Top-up) Order 1996 S.I. 1996/2396

== 2401–2500 ==
- Housing Act 1996 (Commencement No. 3 and Transitional Provisions) Order 1996 S.I. 1996/2402
- Cornwall (Coroners' Districts) (Amendment) Order 1996 S.I. 1996/2403
- Community Charge and Council Tax (Administration and Enforcement) (Amendment) (Jobseeker's Allowance) Regulations 1996 S.I. 1996/2405
- Parliamentary Pensions (Amendment) Regulations 1996 S.I. 1996/2406
- Social Security (Contributions) Amendment (No. 5) Regulations 1996 S.I. 1996/2407
- Local Government Act 1988 (Defined Activities) (Exemption) (London Borough of Brent) Order 1996 S.I. 1996/2417
- Merchant Shipping (Survey and Certification) (Amendment) Regulations 1996 S.I. 1996/2418
- Fishing Vessels (Safety Provisions) (Amendment) Rules 1996 S.I. 1996/2419
- Medicines (Data Sheet) Amendment Regulations 1996 S.I. 1996/2420
- Aerosol Dispensers (EEC Requirements) (Amendment) Regulations 1996 S.I. 1996/2421
- National Health Service Pension Scheme (Provision of Information and Administrative Expenses etc.) Regulations 1996 S.I. 1996/2424
- Income Support and Social Security (Claims and Payments) (Miscellaneous Amendments) Regulations 1996 S.I. 1996/2431
- Council Tax Benefit and Housing Benefit (Miscellaneous Amendments) Regulations 1996 S.I. 1996/2432
- Sea Fishing (Enforcement of Community Quota Measures) (Amendment) Order 1996 S.I. 1996/2433
- Tyne Riverside Enterprise Zones (North Tyneside and South Tyneside) (Designation) Order 1996 S.I. 1996/2435
- Civil Legal Aid (Scotland) Regulations 1996 S.I. 1996/2444
- Act of Sederunt (Sheriff Court Ordinary Cause Rules Amendment) (Miscellaneous) 1996 S.I. 1996/2445
- Act of Sederunt (Proceeds of Crime Rules) 1996 S.I. 1996/2446
- Advice and Assistance (Scotland) (Consolidation and Amendment) Regulations 1996 S.I. 1996/2447
- A1 (Old Craighall Roundabout to East of Haddington) Special Road Regulations 1996 S.I. 1996/2448
- Moorland (Livestock Extensification) (Wales) (Amendment) Regulations 1996 S.I. 1996/2449
- Social Security (Adjudication) and Child Support Amendment (No. 2) Regulations 1996 S.I. 1996/2450
- Security Service Act 1996 (Commencement) Order 1996 S.I. 1996/2454
- Bovine Spongiform Encephalopathy (Amendment) Order 1996 S.I. 1996/2458
- Optimum Health Services National Health Service Trust (Transfer of Trust Property) Order 1996 S.I. 1996/2462
- Plymouth Community Services National Health Service Trust (Transfer of Trust Property) Order 1996 S.I. 1996/2463
- Dairy Products (Hygiene) (Scotland) Amendment Regulations 1996 S.I. 1996/2465
- Food Protection (Emergency Prohibitions) (Paralytic Shellfish Poisoning) Revocation Order 1996 S.I. 1996/2466
- Northbrook Instrument of Management (Variation) Order 1996 S.I. 1996/2467
- Local Government Act 1988 (Defined Activities) (Exemption) (The Common Council of the City of London) Order 1996 S.I. 1996/2469
- Fertilisers (Mammalian Meat and Bone Meal) (Amendment) Regulations 1996 S.I. 1996/2473
- Armed Forces Act 1996 (Commencement No. 1) Order 1996 S.I. 1996/2474
- Personal and Occupational Pension Schemes(Pensions Ombudsman) Regulations 1996 S.I. 1996/2475
- Social Security (Contracting-out and Qualifying Earnings Factor) Regulations 1996 S.I. 1996/2477
- Housing (Right to Buy) (Priority of Charges) Order 1996 S.I. 1996/2479
- Yarmouth (Isle of Wight) Harbour Revision Order 1996 S.I. 1996/2480
- HMSO Trading Fund (Revocation) Order 1996 S.I. 1996/2483
- Local Authorities' Traffic Orders (Procedure) (England and Wales) Regulations 1996 S.I. 1996/2489
- Land Registration (Scotland) Act 1979 (Commencement No. 10) Order 1996 S.I. 1996/2490

== 2501–2600 ==
- Chemical Weapons (Notification) Regulations 1996 (SI 1996/2503)
- Marriage Ceremony (Prescribed Words) Act 1996 (Commencement) Order 1996 (SI 1996/2506)
- Act of Sederunt (Sheriff Court Bankruptcy Rules) 1996 (SI 1996/2507)
- United Kingdom Atomic Energy Authority (Extinguishment of Liabilities) Order 1996 (SI 1996/2511)
- Employment Rights Act 1996 (Residuary Commencement No. 1) Order 1996 (SI 1996/2514)
- Private International Law (Miscellaneous Provisions) Act 1995 (Commencement No. 2) Order 1996 (SI 1996/2515)
- County Courts (Interest on Judgment Debts) (Amendment) Order 1996 (SI 1996/2516)
- Occupational Pension Schemes (Modification of Schemes) Regulations 1996 (SI 1996/2517)
- Social Security (Non-Dependant Deductions) Regulations 1996 (SI 1996/2518)
- Social Security (Jobseeker's Allowance and Payments on Account) (Miscellaneous Amendments) Regulations 1996 (SI 1996/2519)
- Local Government Act 1988 (Defined Activities) (Exemption) (Lewisham London Borough Council) Order 1996 (SI 1996/2520)
- Fresh Meat (Beef Controls) (No. 2) (Amendment) Regulations 1996 (SI 1996/2522)
- Child Benefit (General) Amendment (No. 2) Regulations 1996 (SI 1996/2530)
- Local Authorities (Goods and Services) (Public Bodies) (The Julie Rose Stadium) Order 1996 (SI 1996/2534)
- Gas Safety (Rights of Entry) Regulations 1996 (SI 1996/2535)
- Finance Act 1996, section 8, (Appointed Day) Order 1996 (SI 1996/2536)
- Hydrocarbon Oil Duties (Marine Voyages Reliefs) Regulations 1996 (SI 1996/2537)
- Social Security and Child Support (Jobseeker's Allowance) (Miscellaneous Amendments) Regulations 1996 (SI 1996/2538)
- Local Authorities (Capital Finance) (Amendment No. 3) Regulations 1996 (SI 1996/2539)
- Civil Aviation (Canadian Navigation Services) (Amendment) Regulations 1996 (SI 1996/2540)
- Gas Safety (Installation and Use) (Amendment) (No. 2) Regulations 1996 (SI 1996/2541)
- Local Government Act 1988 (Defined Activities) (Exemption) (Braintree and South Bedfordshire District Councils) Order 1996 (SI 1996/2542)
- A406 Trunk Road (Enfield) Red Route Traffic Order 1996 (SI 1996/2543)
- Social Fund Cold Weather Payments (General) Amendment Regulations 1996 (SI 1996/2544)
- Income-related Benefits and Jobseeker's Allowance (Personal Allowances for Children and Young Persons) (Amendment) Regulations 1996 (SI 1996/2545)
- National Park Authorities (England) (Amendment) Order 1996 (SI 1996/2546)
- Local Government Changes (Rent Act Registration Areas) Order 1996 S.I. 1996/2547
- Prosecutor's Right of Appeal in Summary Proceedings (Scotland) Order 1996 S.I. 1996/2548
- Parental Responsibilities and Parental Rights Agreement (Scotland) Regulations 1996 S.I. 1996/2549
- Legal Aid in Contempt of Court Proceedings (Scotland) Amendment Regulations 1996 S.I. 1996/2550
- Railtrack Group PLC (Target Investment Limit) Order 1996 S.I. 1996/2551
- British Waterways Board (Sheffield and Tinsley Canal) (Reclassification) Order 1996 S.I. 1996/2552
- Swindon and Marlborough National Health Service Trust (Transfer of Trust Property) Order 1996 S.I. 1996/2553
- Income Tax (Employments) (Amendment No. 5) Regulations 1996 S.I. 1996/2554
- Criminal Legal Aid (Scotland) Regulations 1996 S.I. 1996/2555
- National Health Service (Optical Charges and Payments) (Scotland) Amendment (No. 3) Regulations 1996 S.I. 1996/2556
- Foreign Satellite Service Proscription Order 1996 S.I. 1996/2557
- Registration of Marriages (Amendment) Regulations 1996 S.I. 1996/2558
- A3 Trunk Road (Woolmer Road Junction Improvement Slip Road) Order 1996 S.I. 1996/2559
- Environment Act (Commencement No. 6 and Repeal Provisions) Order 1996 (SI 1996/2560)
- Beef (Marketing Payment) (Amendment) Regulations 1996 S.I. 1996/2561
- Potatoes Originating in the Netherlands Regulations 1996 S.I. 1996/2563
- Education (Recognised Awards) (Richmond College) (No. 2) Order 1996 S.I. 1996/2564
- Jobseeker's Allowance (Transitional Provisions) Regulations 1996 S.I. 1996/2567
- Social Security (Back to Work Bonus) (No. 2) Regulations 1996 S.I. 1996/2570
- National Health Service (Optical Charges and Payments) Amendment (No. 3) Regulations 1996 S.I. 1996/2574
- Education (School Performance Information) (England) Regulations 1996 S.I. 1996/2577
- Civil Courts (Amendment No. 3) Order 1996 (SI 1996/2579)
- Education (School Information) (England) Regulations 1996 (SI 1996/2585)
- Act of Sederunt (Sheriff Court Ordinary Cause Rules Amendment) (Miscellaneous) (Amendment) 1996 (SI 1996/2586)
- Act of Sederunt (Rules of the Court of Session Amendment No. 5) (Family Actions and Miscellaneous) 1996 (SI 1996/2587)
- Central Nottinghamshire Healthcare National Health Service Trust (Establishment) Amendment Order 1996 (SI 1996/2588)
- Criminal Justice Act 1988 (Application to Service Courts) (Evidence) Order 1996 (SI 1996/2592)
- Antarctic Act 1994 (Gibraltar) Order 1996 (SI 1996/2593)
- Education (Inspectors of Schools in England) Order 1996 (SI 1996/2594)
- Child Abduction and Custody (Parties to Conventions) (Amendment) (No. 2) Order 1996 (SI 1996/2595)
- European Convention on Extradition Order 1990 (Amendment) Order 1996 (SI 1996/2596)
- Housing Benefit (Payment to Third Parties) (Northern Ireland) Order 1996 (SI 1996/2597)
- Double Taxation Relief (Taxes on Income) (Mongolia) Order 1996 (SI (SI 1996/2598)
- Double Taxation Relief (Taxes on Income) (Venezuela) Order 1996 (SI 1996/2599)
- European Convention on Cinematographic Co-production (Amendment) Order 1996 (SI 1996/2600)

== 2601–2700 ==
- Parliamentary Commissioner (No. 2) Order 1996 S.I. 1996/2601
- Essex Ambulance Service National Health Service Trust (Establishment) Amendment Order 1996 S.I. 1996/2602
- Income Support (General) Amendment (No. 3) Regulations 1996 S.I. 1996/2614
- Free Zone (Southampton) Designation (Variation of Area) Order 1996 S.I. 1996/2615
- Income Tax (Interest Relief) (Housing Associations) (Amendment) Regulations 1996 S.I. 1996/2616
- Airport Byelaws (Designation) Order 1996 S.I. 1996/2617
- Specified Diseases (Notification) Order 1996 S.I. 1996/2628
- Marketing Development (Limitation) Scheme 1996 S.I. 1996/2629
- Child Support Act 1995 (Commencement No. 3) Order 1996 S.I. 1996/2630
- Income Tax (Employments) (Amendment No. 6) Regulations 1996 S.I. 1996/2631
- Merchant Shipping (Fees) (Amendment) Regulations 1996 S.I. 1996/2632
- Dangerous Substances and Preparations (Safety) (Consolidation) (Amendment) Regulations 1996 S.I. 1996/2635
- Measuring Equipment (Measures of Length) (Amendment) Regulations 1996 S.I. 1996/2636
- Pensions Act 1995 (Commencement No. 8) Order 1996 S.I. 1996/2637
- Personal and Occupational Pension Schemes (Pensions Ombudsman) (Procedure) Amendment Rules 1996 S.I. 1996/2638
- M4 Motorway (Maidenhead Windsor And Eton Flood Alleviation Scheme) (Temporary Diversion) Scheme 1996 S.I. 1996/2639
- River Stinchar Salmon Fishery District (Baits and Lures) Regulations 1996 S.I. 1996/2640
- River Forth Salmon Fishery District (Baits and Lures) Regulations 1996 S.I. 1996/2641
- Manufactured Overseas Dividends (French Indemnity Payments) (Amendment) Regulations 1996 S.I. 1996/2642
- Income Tax (Manufactured Overseas Dividends) (Amendment No. 2) Regulations 1996 S.I. 1996/2643
- Taxes (Interest Rate) (Amendment No. 3) Regulations 1996 S.I. 1996/2644
- Income and Corporation Taxes Act 1988, section 737A, (Appointed Day) Order 1996 S.I. 1996/2645
- Finance Act 1996, section 159,(Appointed Day) Order 1996 S.I. 1996/2646
- Hull and Holderness Community Health National Health Service Trust (Transfer of Trust Property) (No. 2)Order 1996 S.I. 1996/2647
- Safety of Sports Grounds (Designation) Order 1996 S.I. 1996/2648
- Food Protection (Emergency Prohibitions) (Oil and Chemical Pollution of Fish and Plants) (Partial Revocation No. 6) Order 1996 S.I. 1996/2649
- Road Traffic (Permitted Parking Areas and Special Parking Areas) (City of Oxford and Parish of North Hinksey) Order 1996 S.I. 1996/2650
- Housing (Right to Buy) (Prescribed Persons) (Amendment) Order 1996 S.I. 1996/2651
- Housing (Right to Buy) (Prescribed Forms) (Amendment) Regulations 1996 S.I. 1996/2652
- Sports Grounds and Sporting Events (Designation) (Scotland) Amendment Order 1996 S.I. 1996/2653
- Double Taxation Relief (Manufactured Overseas Dividends) (Amendment) Regulations 1996 S.I. 1996/2654
- Legal Aid in Criminal and Care Proceedings (Costs) (Amendment) (No. 2) Regulations 1996 S.I. 1996/2655
- Legal Aid in Criminal and Care Proceedings (General) (Amendment) (No. 5) Regulations 1996 S.I. 1996/2656
- Dairy Produce Quotas (Amendment) Regulations 1996 S.I. 1996/2657
- Housing Act 1996 (Commencement No. 4) Order 1996 S.I. 1996/2658
- Social Security (Adjudication) Amendment(No. 2) Regulations 1996 S.I. 1996/2659
- Duffield and Wirksworth Light Railway Order 1996 (SI 1996/2660)
- A6 Trunk Road (Rothwell and Desborough Bypass and Detrunking) Order 1996 S.I. 1996/2661
- Export of Goods (Control) (Amendment No. 2) Order 1996 S.I. 1996/2663
- Motorways Traffic (Scotland) Amendment Regulations 1996 S.I. 1996/2664
- Cycle Racing on Highways (Scotland) Amendment Regulations 1996 S.I. 1996/2665
- Antarctic Act 1994 (Commencement) Order 1996 (SI 1996/2666)
- A41 London—Birmingham Trunk Road (East of Aylesbury to West of Tring) Detrunking Order 1991 (Amendment) Order 1996 S.I. 1996/2667
- Chemical Weapons (Notification) (Amendment) Regulations 1996 S.I. 1996/2669
- Licensing (Amendment) (Scotland) Act 1996 Commencement Order 1996 S.I. 1996/2670
- Asylum (Designated Countries of Destination and Designated Safe Third Countries) Order 1996 S.I. 1996/2671
- Northwick Park and St. Mark's National Health Service Trust (Transfer of Trust Property) Order 1996 S.I. 1996/2672
- Endangered Species (Import and Export) Act 1976 (Amendment) Order 1996 S.I. 1996/2677
- Environmental Protection (Prescribed Processes and Substances Etc.) (Amendment) (Petrol Vapour Recovery) Regulations 1996 S.I. 1996/2678
- Endangered Species (Import and Export) Act 1976 (Amendment) Regulations 1996 S.I. 1996/2684
- Seal Fisheries (North Pacific) Act 1912 (Amendment) Regulations 1996 S.I. 1996/2685
- Import of Seal Skins Regulations 1996 S.I. 1996/2686
- A41 Trunk Road (Camden and Westminster) Red Route (Bus Lanes) (No. 2) Experimental Traffic Order 1996 S.I. 1996/2687
- A41 Trunk Road (Westminster) Red Route (No. 2) Experimental Traffic Order 1996 S.I. 1996/2688
- A501 Trunk Road (Marylebone Road, Westminster) Red Route (Prescribed Routes and Prohibited Turns) (No. 1) Traffic Order 1996 S.I. 1996/2689

== 2701–2800 ==
- Children (Scotland) Act 1995 (Commencement No. 2 and Transitional Provisions) (Amendment) Order 1996 S.I. 1996/2708
- Act of Sederunt (Proceedings in the Sheriff Court under the Debtors (Scotland) Act 1987) (Amendment) 1996 S.I. 1996/2709
- European Parliamentary Elections (Day of By-election) (Merseyside West Constituency) Order 1996 S.I. 1996/2710
- Travel Concession Schemes (Amendment) Regulations 1996 S.I. 1996/2711
- Greater Manchester (Light Rapid Transit System) (Eccles Extension) Order 1996 S.I. 1996/2714
- Local Government Act 1988 (Defined Activities) (Exemption) (Reigate and Banstead Borough Council) Order 1996 S.I. 1996/2715
- Electricity Act 1989 (Disclosure of Information) (Licence Holders) Order 1996 S.I. 1996/2716
- Dual-Use and Related Goods (Export Control) Regulations 1996 S.I. 1996/2721
- Leeds City Council (A64(M) Motorway Slip Road at Mabgate) Scheme 1995 Confirmation Instrument 1996 S.I. 1996/2724
- A2 Trunk Road (Bexley) Red Route Traffic Order 1996 S.I. 1996/2726
- A20 Trunk Road (Greenwich) Red Route Traffic Order 1996 S.I. 1996/2727
- A20 Trunk Road (Bexley and Bromley) Red Route Traffic Order 1996 S.I. 1996/2728
- Dorset Health Authority (Transfers of Trust Property) Order 1996 S.I. 1996/2731
- Eastbourne and County Healthcare National Health Service Trust (Transfer of Trust Property) Order 1996 S.I. 1996/2732
- United Leeds Teaching Hospitals National Health Service trust (Transfer of Trust Property) Order 1996 S.I. 1996/2733
- St. James's and Seacroft University Hospitals National Health Service Trust (Transfer of Trust Property) Order 1996 S.I. 1996/2734
- Social Security (Invalid Care Allowance) Amendment Regulations 1996 S.I. 1996/2744
- Social Security Benefit (Computation of Earnings) Regulations 1996 S.I. 1996/2745
- Local Government Act 1988 (Defined Activities) (Exemption) (Merton London Borough Council) Order 1996 S.I. 1996/2746
- Finance Act 1996, section 6, (Appointed Day) Order 1996 S.I. 1996/2751
- Wine and Made-wine (Amendment) Regulations 1996 S.I. 1996/2752
- Allocation of Housing Regulations 1996 S.I. 1996/2753
- Homelessness Regulations 1996 S.I. 1996/2754
- Peterhead Harbours Revision Order 1996 S.I. 1996/2755
- Stands for Carry-cots (Safety) (Revocation) Regulations 1996 S.I. 1996/2756
- Trade Descriptions (Place of Production) (Marking) (Revocation) Order 1996 S.I. 1996/2757
- Multiplex Licence (Broadcasting of Programmes in Gaelic) Order 1996 S.I. 1996/2758
- Broadcasting (Percentage of Television Multiplex Revenue) Order 1996 S.I. 1996/2759
- Independent Analogue Broadcasters (Reservation of Digital Capacity) Order 1996 S.I. 1996/2760
- Dogs (Fouling of Land) Regulations 1996 S.I. 1996/2762
- Dog Fouling (Fixed Penalties) Order 1996 S.I. 1996/2763
- International Carriage of Perishable Foodstuffs (Amendment) Regulations 1996 S.I. 1996/2765
- Isle of Wight Community Healthcare National Health Service Trust Dissolution Order 1996 S.I. 1996/2766
- St. Mary's Hospital National Health Service Trust Dissolution Order 1996 S.I. 1996/2767
- Isle of Wight Healthcare National Health Service Trust (Establishment) Order 1996 S.I. 1996/2768
- Act of Sederunt (Rules of the Court of Session Amendment No. 6) 1996 S.I. 1996/2769
- Teachers (Compensation for Redundancy and Premature Retirement) (Amendment) Regulations 1996 S.I. 1996/2777
- Health and Safety (Fees) Regulations 1996 S.I. 1996/2791
- A406 Trunk Road (Enfield) Red Route (Clearway) Traffic Order 1995 Variation Order 1996 S.I. 1996/2792
- Disability Discrimination (Questions and Replies) Order 1996 S.I. 1996/2793
- National Park Authorities (Levies) (England) Regulations 1996 S.I. 1996/2794
- Gas Act 1986 (Exemptions) (No. 4) Order 1996 (SI 1996/2795)
- Energy Conservation Act 1996 (Commencement No. 1) (Scotland) Order 1996 S.I. 1996/2796
- Home Energy Conservation Act 1995 (Commencement No. 3) (Scotland) Order 1996 S.I. 1996/2797
- Civil Aviation (Investigation of Air Accidents and Incidents) Regulations 1996 S.I. 1996/2798
- Vehicle Registration (Sale of Information) Regulations 1996 S.I. 1996/2800

== 2801–2900 ==
- Industrial Tribunals (Interest on Awards in Discrimination Cases) Regulations 1996 S.I. 1996/2803
- Local Government, Teachers' and National Health Service (Scotland) Pension Schemes (Provision of Information and Administrative Expenses etc.) Regulations 1996 S.I. 1996/2809
- County Court (Amendment No. 2) Rules 1996 S.I. 1996/2810
- County Court (Forms) (Amendment) Rules 1996 S.I. 1996/2811
- Plastic Materials and Articles in Contact with Food (Amendment) (No. 2) Regulations 1996 S.I. 1996/2817
- Residuary Body for Wales (Penlan Road Offices Carmarthen) Order 1996 S.I. 1996/2819
- Joint Consultative Committees Order 1996 S.I. 1996/2820
- Merchant Shipping and Fishing Vessels (Medical Stores) (Amendment) Regulations 1996 S.I. 1996/2821
- Motor Vehicles (Driving Licences) Regulations 1996 S.I. 1996/2824
- Local Government Changes For England (Property Transfer and Transitional Payments) (Amendment) (No. 2) Regulations 1996 S.I. 1996/2825
- Local Government Changes for England (Capital Finance) (Amendment) Regulations 1996 S.I. 1996/2826
- Open-Ended Investment Companies (Investment Companies with Variable Capital) Regulations 1996 S.I. 1996/2827
- Approval of Codes of Management Practice (Residential Property) Order 1996 S.I. 1996/2839
- A13 Trunk Road (A117 Junction Improvement, Trunk Road and Slip Roads) Order 1996 S.I. 1996/2840
- A13 Trunk Road (Movers Lane Junction Improvement, Trunk Road And Slip Roads) Order 1996 S.I. 1996/2841
- Housing Grants, Construction and Regeneration Act 1996 (Commencement No. 2 and Revocation, Savings, Supplementary and Transitional Provisions) Order 1996 S.I. 1996/2842
- Home-Grown Cereals Authority Levy (Variation) Scheme (Approval) Order 1996 Approved by both Houses of Parliament S.I. 1996/2843
- M23 Motorway (Balcombe Road Interchange) Connecting Roads Scheme 1996 S.I. 1996/2854
- Act of Sederunt (Fees of Messengers-at-Arms) 1996 S.I. 1996/2855
- Act of Sederunt (Lands Valuation Appeal Court) 1996 S.I. 1996/2856
- Environment Act 1995 (Commencement No. 7) (Scotland) Order 1996 S.I. 1996/2857
- Act of Sederunt (Fees of Sheriff Officers) 1996 S.I. 1996/2858
- Offshore Installations (Safety Zones) (No. 7) Order 1996 S.I. 1996/2859
- Royal Surrey County and St. LUke's Hospitals National Health Service Trust (Change of Name) Order 1996 S.I. 1996/2860
- Leeds Community and Mental Health Services Teaching National Health Service Trust (Transfer of Trust Property) Order 1996 S.I. 1996/2861
- Northumberland Health Authority (Transfers of Trust Property) Order 1996 S.I. 1996/2862
- Ayr Road Route (M77) (Speed Limit) Regulations 1996 S.I. 1996/2863
- East Yorkshire Community Healthcare National Health Service Trust (Transfer of Trust Property) Order 1996 S.I. 1996/2866
- Bodmin and Wenford Light Railway Order 1996 (SI 1996/2867)
- Child Abduction and Custody (Parties to Conventions) (Amendment) (No. 3) Order 1996 S.I. 1996/2874
- European Convention on Extradition(Dependent Territories) Order 1996 S.I. 1996/2875
- Intelligence Services Act 1994 (Dependent Territories) (Amendment) Order 1996 S.I. 1996/2876
- Criminal Justice Act 1988 (Designated Countries and Territories) (Amendment) (No. 2) Order 1996 S.I. 1996/2877
- Criminal Justice (International Co-operation) Act 1990 (Enforcement of Overseas Forfeiture Orders) (Amendment) Order 1996 S.I. 1996/2878
- Domestic Energy Efficiency Schemes (Northern Ireland) Order 1996 S.I. 1996/2879
- Drug Trafficking Act 1994 (Designated Countries and Territories) Order 1996 S.I. 1996/2880
- Maritime Security (Jersey) Order 1996 S.I. 1996/2881
- Naval, Military and Air Forces Etc. (Disablement and Death) Service Pensions Amendment (No. 3) Order 1996 S.I. 1996/2882
- Group Repair (Qualifying Buildings) Regulations 1996 S.I. 1996/2883
- Housing (Deferred Action and Charge for Enforcement Action) (Forms) Regulations 1996 S.I. 1996/2884
- Housing (Fitness Enforcement Procedures) Order 1996 S.I. 1996/2885
- Housing (Maximum Charge for Enforcement Action) Order 1996 S.I. 1996/2886
- Home Repair Assistance Regulations 1996 S.I. 1996/2887
- Disabled Facilities Grants and Home Repair Assistance (Maximum Amounts) Order 1996 S.I. 1996/2888
- Housing Renewal Grants (Services and Charges) Order 1996 S.I. 1996/2889
- Housing Renewal Grants Regulations 1996 S.I. 1996/2890
- Housing Renewal Grants (Prescribed Form and Particulars) Regulations 1996 S.I. 1996/2891
- Rules of the Supreme Court (Amendment) 1996 S.I. 1996/2892
- Judicial Pensions (Miscellaneous) (Amendment) Regulations 1996 S.I. 1996/2893
- Law Reform (Miscellaneous Provisions) (Scotland) Act 1990 (Commencement No. 13) Order 1996 S.I. 1996/2894
- Residuary Body for Wales (Levies) Regulations 1996 S.I. 1996/2900

== 2901–3000 ==
- Local Government Act 1988 (Defined Activities) (Exemption) (Harborough District Council) Order 1996 S.I. 1996/2902
- Income Support (General) (Standard Interest Rate Amendment) (No. 3) Regulations 1996 S.I. 1996/2903
- Education Act 1996 (Commencement No. 1) Order 1996 S.I. 1996/2904
- Conservation of Seals (England) Order 1996 S.I. 1996/2905
- Horserace Totalisator Board (Extension of Powers) Order 1996 S.I. 1996/2906
- Child Support Departure Direction and Consequential Amendments Regulations 1996 S.I. 1996/2907
- Merchant Shipping (Ship Inspection and Survey Organisations) Regulations 1996 S.I. 1996/2908
- Environment Act 1995 (Commencement No. 8 and Saving Provisions) Order 1996 S.I. 1996/2909
- A40 Trunk Road (Western Avenue, Hillingdon) (30 MPH Speed Limit) Order 1996 S.I. 1996/2910
- Utilities Contracts Regulations 1996 S.I. 1996/2911
- Leicestershire Fire Services (Combination Scheme) Order 1996 S.I. 1996/2912
- National Park Authorities (Levies) (Wales) (Amendment) Regulations 1996 S.I. 1996/2913
- Denbighshire and Wrexham (Areas) Order 1996 S.I. 1996/2914
- Bridgend and The Vale of Glamorgan (Areas) Order 1996 S.I. 1996/2915
- Wiltshire Fire Services (Combination Scheme) Order 1996 S.I. 1996/2916
- Staffordshire Fire Services (Combination Scheme) Order 1996 S.I. 1996/2917
- Bedfordshire Fire Services (Combination Scheme) Order 1996 S.I. 1996/2918
- Derbyshire Fire Services (Combination Scheme) Order 1996 S.I. 1996/2919
- Dorset Fire Services (Combination Scheme) Order 1996 S.I. 1996/2920
- Durham Fire Services (Combination Scheme) Order 1996 S.I. 1996/2921
- East Sussex Fire Services (Combination Scheme) Order 1996 S.I. 1996/2922
- Hampshire Fire Services (Combination Scheme) Order 1996 S.I. 1996/2923
- Buckinghamshire Fire Services (Combination Scheme) Order 1996 S.I. 1996/2924
- Cosmetic Products (Safety) Regulations 1996 S.I. 1996/2925
- Occupational Pensions (Revaluation) Order 1996 S.I. 1996/2926
- Local Government Act 1988 (Defined Activities) (Exemption of Ground Maintenance in Trunk Road Work Agreements) (Scotland) Order 1996 S.I. 1996/2934
- Local Government, Planning and Land Act 1980 (Competition) (Scotland) Regulations 1996 S.I. 1996/2935
- Local Government, Planning and Land Act 1980 (Competition) (Scotland) Amendment Regulations 1996 S.I. 1996/2936
- A41 Trunk Road (Watford Way/Hendon Way, Barnet) Temporary Prohibition of Traffic Order 1996 S.I. 1996/2942
- Professions Supplementary to Medicine (Registration Rules) (Amendment) Order of Council 1996 S.I. 1996/2945
- Petroleum (Production) (Seaward Areas) (Amendment) Regulations 1996 S.I. 1996/2946
- Value Added Tax (Increase of Consideration for Fuel) Order 1996 S.I. 1996/2948
- Value Added Tax (Pharmaceutical Chemists) Order 1996 S.I. 1996/2949
- Value Added Tax (Increase of Registration Limits) Order 1996 S.I. 1996/2950
- Retirement Benefits Schemes (Indexation of Earnings Cap) Order 1996 S.I. 1996/2951
- Income Tax (Indexation) Order 1996 S.I. 1996/2952
- Income Tax (Furnished Accommodation) (Basic Amount) Order 1996 S.I. 1996/2953
- Income Tax (Cash Equivalents of Car Fuel Benefits) Order 1996 S.I. 1996/2954
- Insurance Premium Tax (Taxable Insurance Contracts) Order 1996 S.I. 1996/2955
- Inheritance Tax (Indexation) Order 1996 S.I. 1996/2956
- Capital Gains Tax (Annual Exempt Amount) Order 1996 S.I. 1996/2957
- Financial Services Act 1986 (Extension of Scope of Act) Order 1996 S.I. 1996/2958
- Housing Act 1996 (Commencement No. 5 and Transitional Provisions) Order 1996 S.I. 1996/2959
- Value Added Tax (Amendment) (No. 5) Regulations 1996 S.I. 1996/2960
- Local Government Act 1988 (Defined Activities) (Exemption) (North Hertfordshire District Council and Hertsmere Borough Council) Order 1996 S.I. 1996/2961
- Local Government Act 1988 (Defined Activities) (Exemption) (Cleveland Police Authority) Order 1996 S.I. 1996/2965
- Law Reform (Miscellaneous Provisions) (Scotland) Act 1990 (Commencement No. 13) (Amendment) Order 1996 S.I. 1996/2966
- Copyright and Related Rights Regulations 1996 S.I. 1996/2967
- Statistics of Trade (Customs and Excise) (Amendment) Regulations 1996 S.I. 1996/2968
- Income Tax (Employments) (Notional Payments) (Amendment) Regulations 1996 S.I. 1996/2969
- Asylum and Immigration Act 1996 (Commencement No. 3 and Transitional Provisions) Order 1996 S.I. 1996/2970
- Control of Pollution (Applications, Appeals and Registers) Regulations 1996 S.I. 1996/2971
- Patents (Fees) Rules 1996 S.I. 1996/2972
- Army Terms of Service (Amendment) Regulations 1996 S.I. 1996/2973
- Trusts of Land and Appointment of Trustees Act 1996 (Commencement) Order 1996 S.I. 1996/2974
- Land Registration Rules 1996 S.I. 1996/2975
- National Park Authorities (Levies) (England) (Amendment) Regulations 1996 S.I. 1996/2976
- A66 Trunk Road (Long Newton Grade Separated Junction Slip Roads) Order 1996 S.I. 1996/2977
- London Docklands Development Corporation (Alteration of Boundaries) (Surrey Docks) Order 1996 S.I. 1996/2986
- Disability Discrimination Code of Practice (Goods, Services, Facilities and Premises) Order 1996 S.I. 1996/2987
- Social Security (Claims and Payments) Amendment (No. 2) Regulations 1996 S.I. 1996/2988
- Building Societies (Designated Capital Resources) (Amendment) Order 1996 S.I. 1996/2989
- Insurance Companies (Reserves) (Tax) Regulations 1996 S.I. 1996/2991
- Value Added Tax (Place of Supply of Services) (Amendment) Order 1996 S.I. 1996/2992
- Deregulation (Bills of Exchange) Order 1996 S.I. 1996/2993
- Financial Services Act 1986 (Restriction of Scope of Act and Meaning of Collective Investment Scheme) Order 1996 S.I. 1996/2996
- A30 Trunk Road (Great South West Road, Hounslow) (Temporary Restriction of Traffic) Order 1996 S.I. 1996/2997
- Dental Auxiliaries (Amendment) Regulations 1996 S.I. 1996/2998
- Beef (Marketing Payment) (No. 2) Regulations 1996 S.I. 1996/2999
- Bovine Products (Despatch to other Member States) (Amendment) Regulations 1996 S.I. 1996/3000

== 3001–3100 ==
- Surface Waters (Abstraction for Drinking Water) (Classification) Regulations 1996 (SI 1996/3001)
- A406 London North Circular Trunk Road Popes Lane (B4491) to Western Avenue (A40) Improvement Orders 1988 Revocation Order 1996 (SI 1996/3002)
- Disability Discrimination Act 1995 (Commencement No. 4) Order 1996 (SI 1996/3003)
- Friendly Societies (Insurance Business) (Amendment) Regulations 1996 (SI 1996/3008)
- Friendly Societies (Activities of a Subsidiary) Order 1996 (SI 1996/3009)
- Merchant Shipping (Dangerous or Noxious Liquid Substances in Bulk) Regulations 1996 (SI 1996/3010)
- Insurance (Lloyd's) Regulations 1996 (SI 1996/3011)
- Mid Essex Community and Mental Health National Health Service Trust (Establishment) Amendment Order 1996 (SI 1996/3012)
- Motor Vehicles (Approval) Regulations 1996 (SI 1996/3013)
- Motor Vehicles (Type Approval for Goods Vehicles) (Great Britain) (Amendment) (No. 2) Regulations 1996 (SI 1996/3014)
- Motor Vehicles (Type Approval) (Great Britain) (Amendment) (No. 2) Regulations 1996 (SI 1996/3015)
- Road Vehicles Lighting (Amendment) Regulations 1996 (SI 1996/3016)
- Road Vehicles (Construction And Use) (Amendment) (No. 6) Regulations 1996 (SI 1996/3017)
- Non-Domestic Rating Contributions (Wales) (Amendment) Regulations 1996 (SI 1996/3018)
- Health Authorities Act 1995 (Transitional Provisions) (Wales) Amendment Order 1996 (SI 1996/3019)
- Measuring Equipment (Measures of Length) (Amendment) (No. 2) Regulations 1996 (SI 1996/3020)
- General Optical Council (Registration and Enrolment (Amendment) Rules) Order of Council 1996 (SI 1996/3021)
- Health and Safety (Repeals and Revocations) Regulations 1996 (SI 1996/3022)
- New Town (Cumbernauld) (Transfer of Property, Rights and Liabilities) (No. 2) Order 1996 S.I. 1996/3024
- A41 Trunk Road (Leavesden Slip Road) Order 1996 S.I. 1996/3026
- Chemical Weapons (Licence Appeal Provisions) Order 1996 S.I. 1996/3030
- Social Security (Contributions) Amendment (No. 6) Regulations 1996 S.I. 1996/3031
- Civil Aviation (Joint Financing) (Second Amendment) Regulations 1996 S.I. 1996/3032
- Road Vehicles (Construction and Use) (Amendment) (No. 7) Regulations 1996 S.I. 1996/3033
- Medicines (Veterinary Drugs) (Pharmacy and Merchants' List) (Amendment) Order 1996 S.I. 1996/3034
- Habitats (Scotland) Amendment Regulations 1996 S.I. 1996/3035
- Heather Moorland (Livestock Extensification) (Scotland) Amendment Regulations 1996 S.I. 1996/3036
- Set-Aside Access (Scotland) Amendment and Revocation Regulations 1996 S.I. 1996/3037
- Road Traffic (Special Parking Area) (Royal Borough of Kingston upon Thames) Order 1996 S.I. 1996/3038
- Personal Protective Equipment (EC Directive) (Amendment) Regulations 1996 S.I. 1996/3039
- Bridlington Harbour Revision Order 1996 S.I. 1996/3040
- Criminal Appeal Act 1995 (Commencement No. 2) Order 1996 S.I. 1996/3041
- Statutory Sick Pay (General) Amendment Regulations 1996 S.I. 1996/3042
- Monmouth–Fishguard Trunk Road (A40) (Carmarthen Eastern Bypass) Order 1996 S.I. 1996/3043
- River Ythan Salmon Fishery District (Baits and Lures) Regulations 1996 S.I. 1996/3046
- Surface Waters (Abstraction for Drinking Water) (Classification) (Scotland) Regulations 1996 S.I. 1996/3047
- Vocational Training (Public Financial Assistance and Disentitlement to Tax Relief) (Amendment) Regulations 1996 S.I. 1996/3049
- A23 Trunk Road (Croydon) Red Route (Bus Lanes) Traffic Order 1996 S.I. 1996/3050
- A23 Trunk Road (Croydon) Red Route (Clearway) Traffic Order 1996 S.I. 1996/3051
- A316 Trunk Road (Richmond) (No. 1) Red Route Traffic Order 1996 S.I. 1996/3052
- Motorways Traffic (England and Wales) (Amendment) Regulations 1996 S.I. 1996/3053
- Medicines (Pharmacies) (Applications for Registration and Fees) Amendment Regulations 1996 S.I. 1996/3054
- Litter (Fixed Penalty) Order 1996 S.I. 1996/3055
- Environmental Protection Act 1990 (Commencement No. 18) Order 1996 (SI 1996/3056)
- Passenger Transport Executives (Capital Finance) (Amendment) Order 1996 S.I. 1996/3058
- Road Traffic (Special Parking Area) (London Borough of Redbridge) (Amendment) Order 1996 S.I. 1996/3059
- A23 Trunk Road (Croydon)Red Route (Prescribed Route) Traffic Order 1996 S.I. 1996/3060
- Code of Practice on Environmental Procedures for Flood Defence Operating Authorities (Environment Agency) Approval Order 1996 S.I. 1996/3061
- Code of Practice on Environmental Procedures for Flood Defence Operating Authorities (Internal Drainage Boards and Local Authorities) Approval Order 1996 (SI 1996/3062)
- Offensive Weapons Act 1996 (Commencement No. 2) Order 1996 (SI 1996/3063)
- Criminal Justice Act 1988 (Offensive Weapons) (Exemption) Order 1996 S.I. 1996/3064
- Water Supply and Sewerage Services (Customer Service Standards) (Amendment) Regulations 1996 (SI 1996/3065)
- Education (Grants for Education Support and Training) (England) (Amendment) Regulations 1996 (SI 1996/3066)
- Broadcasting (Channel 3 Transmission and Shared Distribution Costs) Order 1996 S.I. 1996/3067
- Youth Courts (Constitution) (Amendment No. 2)Rules 1996 S.I. 1996/3068
- Grants to the Churches Conservation Trust Order 1996 S.I. 1996/3069
- Non-Domestic Rating Contributions (Scotland) Regulations 1996 S.I. 1996/3070
- Local Government Reorganisation (Wales) (Consequential Amendments No. 3) Order 1996 S.I. 1996/3071
- Habitat (Species-rich Grassland) (Wales) (Amendment) Regulations 1996 S.I. 1996/3072
- Habitat (Water Fringe) (Wales) (Amendment) Regulations 1996 S.I. 1996/3073
- Habitat (Coastal Belt) (Wales) (Amendment) Regulations 1996 S.I. 1996/3074
- Habitat (Broadleaved Woodland) (Wales) (Amendment) Regulations 1996 S.I. 1996/3075
- Moorland (Livestock Extensification) (Wales) (Amendment No. 2) Regulations 1996 S.I. 1996/3076
- Environmentally Sensitive Areas (Wales) Designation Orders (Amendment) Regulations 1996 S.I. 1996/3077
- Grants for Pre-school Education (Social Security Information) (Scotland) Regulations 1996 S.I. 1996/3078
- Grants for Pre-school Education (Prescribed Children) (Scotland) Order 1996 S.I. 1996/3079
- Companies Act 1985 (Audit Exemption) (Amendment) Regulations 1996 S.I. 1996/3080
- Consumer Credit (Exempt Agreements) (Amendment) (No. 2) Order 1996 S.I. 1996/3081
- Environmentally Sensitive Areas (Scotland) Orders Amendment Regulations 1996 S.I. 1996/3082
- Organic Aid (Scotland) Amendment Regulations 1996 S.I. 1996/3083
- Legal Officers (Annual Fees) Order 1996 S.I. 1996/3084
- Ecclesiastical Judges and Legal Officers (Fees) Order 1996 S.I. 1996/3085
- Payments to the Churches Conservation Trust Order 1996 S.I. 1996/3086
- Community Bus (Amendment) Regulations 1996 S.I. 1996/3087
- Minibus and Other Section 19 Permit Buses (Amendment) Regulations 1996 S.I. 1996/3088
- Civil Aviation (Route Charges for Navigation Services) (Second Amendment) Regulations 1996 S.I. 1996/3089
- Animals (Scientific Procedures) Act 1986 (Fees) (No. 1) Order 1996 S.I. 1996/3090
- Animals (Scientific Procedures) Act 1986 (Fees) (No. 2) Order 1996 S.I. 1996/3091
- Local Authorities (Goods and Services) (Public Bodies) (Sports Councils) Order 1996 S.I. 1996/3092
- Channel 4 (Application of Excess Revenues) Order 1996 S.I. 1996/3093
- Friendly Societies (General Charge and Fees) (Amendment) Regulations 1996 S.I. 1996/3094
- National Lottery etc. Act 1993 (Amendment of Section 23) Order 1996 S.I. 1996/3095
- Contracting Out of Functions (Court Staff) (Amendment) Order 1996 S.I. 1996/3096
- Deregulation (Rag Flock and Other Filling Materials Act 1951) (Repeal) Order 1996 S.I. 1996/3097
- Attachment of Debts (Expenses) Order 1996 S.I. 1996/3098
- Education (School Inspection) (No. 2) (Amendment) (No. 2) Regulations 1996 S.I. 1996/3099
- Air Navigation (Dangerous Goods) (Amendment) Regulations 1996 (SI 1996/3100)

== 3101–3200 ==
- Nurses, Midwives and Health Visitors Act 1979 (Amendment) Regulations 1996 S.I. 1996/3101
- European Nursing and Midwifery Qualifications Designation Order 1996 S.I. 1996/3102
- Nurses, Midwives and Health Visitors (Admission to the Register and Training) Amendment Rules Approval Order 1996 S.I. 1996/3103
- Environmentally Sensitive Areas (England) Designation Orders (Amendment) Regulations 1996 S.I. 1996/3104
- Nitrate Sensitive Areas (Amendment) Regulations 1996 S.I. 1996/3105
- Habitat (Water Fringe) (Amendment) (No. 2) Regulations 1996 S.I. 1996/3106
- Habitat (Former Set-Aside Land) (Amendment) (No. 2) Regulations 1996 S.I. 1996/3107
- Habitat (Salt-Marsh) (Amendment) (No. 2) Regulations 1996 S.I. 1996/3108
- Organic Farming (Aid) (Amendment) Regulations 1996 S.I. 1996/3109
- Moorland (Livestock Extensification) (Amendment) (No. 2) Regulations 1996 S.I. 1996/3110
- Countryside Access (Amendment) Regulations 1996 S.I. 1996/3111
- A13 Trunk Road (New Road, Havering) (Prohibition of U-Turns and Use of Gaps in Central Reserve) Order 1996 S.I. 1996/3112
- Retirement Benefits Schemes (Tax Relief on Contributions) (Disapplication of Earnings Cap) (Amendment) Regulations 1996 S.I. 1996/3113
- Retirement Benefits Schemes (Continuation of Rights of Members of Approved Schemes) (Amendment) Regulations 1996 S.I. 1996/3114
- Occupational Pension Schemes (Transitional Provisions) (Amendment) Regulations 1996 S.I. 1996/3115
- Nursery Education (Amendment) Regulations 1996 S.I. 1996/3117
- Local Government (Changes for the Registration Service in Bedfordshire, Buckinghamshire, Derbyshire, Dorset, Durham, East Sussex, Hampshire, Leicestershire, Staffordshire and Wiltshire) Order 1996 S.I. 1996/3118
- Housing Renewal Grants and Home Repair Assistance (Amendment) Regulations 1996 S.I. 1996/3119
- Patents (Supplementary Protection Certificate for Plant Protection Products) Regulations 1996 S.I. 1996/3120
- Industrial and Provident Societies (Forms and Procedure) Regulations 1996 S.I. 1996/3121
- Allocation of Housing and Homelessness (Review Procedures and Amendment) Regulations 1996 S.I. 1996/3122
- Countryside Stewardship (Amendment) (No. 2) Regulations 1996 S.I. 1996/3123
- Products of Animal Origin (Import and Export) Regulations 1996 S.I. 1996/3124
- Fresh Meat (Import Conditions) Regulations 1996 S.I. 1996/3125
- Occupational Pension Schemes(Winding Up) Regulations 1996 S.I. 1996/3126
- Occupational Pension Schemes (Investment) Regulations 1996 S.I. 1996/3127
- Occupational Pension Schemes (Deficiency on Winding Up etc.) Regulations 1996 S.I. 1996/3128
- Road Vehicles (Construction and Use) (Amendment) (No. 8) Regulations 1996 S.I. 1996/3133
- Berkshire College of Art and Design, Maidenhead (Dissolution) Order 1996 S.I. 1996/3136
- Disability Working Allowance and Family Credit (General) Amendment Regulations 1996 S.I. 1996/3137
- Control of Substances Hazardous to Health (Amendment) Regulations 1996 S.I. 1996/3138
- Offshore Installations (Safety Zones) (No. 8) Order 1996 S.I. 1996/3139
- Films (Exhibition Periods) Order 1996 S.I. 1996/3140
- High Court and County Courts Jurisdiction (Amendment) Order 1996 S.I. 1996/3141
- Arable Area Payments Regulations 1996 S.I. 1996/3142
- Council Tax (Discount Disregards) (Amendment) (No. 2) Order 1996 S.I. 1996/3143
- Act of Sederunt (Commissary Court Books) (Amendment) 1996 S.I. 1996/3144
- Arbitration Act 1996 (Commencement No. 1) Order 1996 S.I. 1996/3146
- Employment Protection (Continuity of Employment) Regulations 1996 S.I. 1996/3147
- London Docklands Development Corporation (Alteration of Boundaries) (Limehouse and Wapping) Order 1996 S.I. 1996/3148
- Criminal Appeal Act 1995 (Commencement No. 3) Order 1996 S.I. 1996/3149
- Industrial Tribunals Act 1996 (Commencement) Order 1996 S.I. 1996/3150
- Advanced Television Services Regulations 1996 S.I. 1996/3151
- Registration of Births, Deaths and Marriages (Fees) Order 1996 S.I. 1996/3152
- United Nations Arms Embargoes (Somalia, Liberia and Rwanda) (Isle of Man) Order 1996 S.I. 1996/3153
- United Nations Arms Embargoes (Somalia, Liberia and Rwanda) (Channel Islands) Order 1996 S.I. 1996/3154
- European Communities (Designation) (No. 3) Order 1996 S.I. 1996/3155
- Child Abduction and Custody (Falkland Islands) Order 1996 S.I. 1996/3156
- European Police Office (Legal Capacities) Order 1996 S.I. 1996/3157
- Licensing (Northern Ireland) Order 1996 S.I. 1996/3158
- Registration of Clubs (Northern Ireland) Order 1996 S.I. 1996/3159
- Criminal Justice (Northern Ireland) Order 1996 S.I. 1996/3160
- Criminal Justice (Northern Ireland Consequential Amendments) Order 1996 S.I. 1996/3161
- Rates (Amendment) (Northern Ireland) Order 1996 S.I. 1996/3162
- Succession (Northern Ireland) Order 1996 S.I. 1996/3163
- Double Taxation Relief (Taxes on Income) (China) Order 1996 S.I. 1996/3164
- Double Taxation Relief (Taxes on Income) (Denmark) Order 1996 S.I. 1996/3165
- Double Taxation Relief (Taxes on Income) (Finland) Order 1996 S.I. 1996/3166
- Double Taxation Relief (Taxes on Income) (Latvia) Order 1996 S.I. 1996/3167
- Double Taxation Relief (Taxes on Income) (Republic of Korea) Order 1996 S.I. 1996/3168
- European Convention on Cinematographic Co-production (Amendment) (No. 2) Order 1996 S.I. 1996/3169
- Judicial Committee (Fees) Order 1996 S.I. 1996/3170
- Extraterritorial US Legislation (Sanctions against Cuba, Iran and Libya) (Protection of Trading Interests) Order 1996 S.I. 1996/3171
- Education (Chief Inspector of Schools in Wales) Order 1996 S.I. 1996/3172
- Hovercraft (General) (Amendment) Order 1996 S.I. 1996/3173
- Local Government Act 1988 (Defined Activities) (Exemptions) (Wales) (Amendment) Order 1996 S.I. 1996/3179
- Child Minding and Day Care (Registration and Inspection Fees) (Amendment) Regulations 1996 S.I. 1996/3180
- Home Energy Conservation Act 1995 (Commencement No. 4) (Wales) Order 1996 S.I. 1996/3181
- European Communities (Iron and Steel Employees Re-adaptation Benefits Scheme) (No. 2) (Amendment) Regulations 1996 S.I. 1996/3182
- Bovine Spongiform Encephalopathy (No. 2) Order 1996 S.I. 1996/3183
- Bovine Spongiform Encephalopathy Compensation Order 1996 S.I. 1996/3184
- Specified Bovine Material (No. 3) (Amendment) Order 1996 S.I. 1996/3185
- Selective Cull (Enforcement of Community Compensation Conditions) Regulations 1996 S.I. 1996/3186
- Taxes (Interest Rate) (Amendment No. 4) Regulations 1996 S.I. 1996/3187
- Merchant Shipping (High-Speed Craft) Regulations 1996 S.I. 1996/3188
- County Court Fees (Amendment) Order 1996 S.I. 1996/3189
- Family Proceedings Fees (Amendment) Order 1996 S.I. 1996/3190
- Supreme Court Fees (Amendment) Order 1996 S.I. 1996/3191
- Nursery Education and Grant-Maintained Schools Act 1996 (Commencement No. 2) Order 1996 S.I. 1996/3192
- Medicines (Products Other Than Veterinary Drugs) (Prescription Only) Amendment (No. 2) Order 1996 S.I. 1996/3193
- Social Security (Child Maintenance Bonus) Regulations 1996 S.I. 1996/3195
- Child Support (Miscellaneous Amendments) (No. 2) Regulations 1996 S.I. 1996/3196
- Advanced Television Services (Amendment) Regulations 1996 S.I. 1996/3197
- Motor Vehicles (Driving Licences) (Amendment) Regulations 1996 S.I. 1996/3198
- Road Works (Permission under Section 109) (Scotland) Regulations 1996 S.I. 1996/3199
- Fireworks (Safety) Regulations 1996 S.I. 1996/3200

== 3201–3300 ==
- Children (Scotland) Act 1995 (Commencement No. 3) Order 1996 (SI 1996/3201)
- Act of Sederunt (Civil Legal Aid Rules) (Amendment No. 2) 1996 (SI 1996/3202)
- Gas Act 1995 (Repeal of Superseded Provisions of the Gas Act 1986) Order 1996 (SI 1996/3203)
- Homelessness (Suitability of Accommodation) Order 1996 S.I. 1996/3204
- Local Authorities (Contracting Out of Allocation of Housing and Homelessness Functions) Order 1996 S.I. 1996/3205
- Driving Licences (Designation of Relevant External Law) Order 1996 S.I. 1996/3206
- Social Security (Incapacity for Work and Miscellaneous Amendments) Regulations 1996 S.I. 1996/3207
- Amusements with Prizes (Variation of Monetary Limits) Order 1996 S.I. 1996/3208
- Combined Probation Areas (North Yorkshire) Order 1996 S.I. 1996/3209
- Education Act 1996 (Amendment) Order 1996 S.I. 1996/3210
- Unfair Arbitration Agreements (Specified Amount) Order 1996 S.I. 1996/3211
- Severn Bridges Tolls Order 1996 S.I. 1996/3212
- Naval Medical Compassionate Fund (Amendment) Order 1996 S.I. 1996/3213
- Non-Domestic Rating (Chargeable Amounts for Small Hereditaments) Regulations 1996 S.I. 1996/3214
- High Court and County Courts (Allocation of Arbitration Proceedings) Order 1996 S.I. 1996/3215
- Employment Appeal Tribunal (Amendment) Rules 1996 S.I. 1996/3216
- Civil Evidence Act 1995 (Commencement No. 1) Order 1996 S.I. 1996/3217
- County Court (Amendment No. 3) Rules 1996 S.I. 1996/3218
- Rules of the Supreme Court (Amendment) 1996 S.I. 1996/3219
- Charities (The Proby Trust Fund) Order 1996 S.I. 1996/3220
- Electricity (Scottish Nuclear Limited) (Target Investment Limit) Order 1996 S.I. 1996/3221
- Immigration (Restrictions on Employment) Order 1996 S.I. 1996/3225
- Motor Vehicle Tyres (Safety) (Amendment) Regulations 1996 S.I. 1996/3227
- Civil Aviation Authority (Hovercraft) (Revocation) Regulations 1996 S.I. 1996/3231
- Police (Scotland) Amendment Regulations 1996 S.I. 1996/3232
- Retirement Benefits Schemes (Continuation of Rights of Members of Approved Schemes) (Amendment No. 2) Regulations 1996 S.I. 1996/3233
- Occupational Pension Schemes (Transitional Provisions) (Amendment No. 2) Regulations 1996 S.I. 1996/3234
- Sole (Specified Sea Areas) (Prohibition of Fishing)Order 1996 S.I. 1996/3235
- Haddock, Saithe, etc. (Specified Sea Areas) (Prohibition of Fishing) Order 1996 S.I. 1996/3236
- Public Lending Right Scheme 1982 (Commencement of Variations) (No. 2) Order 1996 S.I. 1996/3237
- Beef Special Premium Regulations 1996 S.I. 1996/3241
- Plant Health (Great Britain) (Amendment) (No. 3) Order 1996 S.I. 1996/3242
- Merchant Shipping (Fees) Regulations 1996 S.I. 1996/3243
- Non-Domestic Rating Contributions (England) (Amendment) (No. 2) Regulations 1996 S.I. 1996/3245
- A23 Trunk Road (Croydon) Red Route (Prescribed Route No. 2) Experimental Traffic Order 1996 S.I. 1996/3253
- A205 Trunk Road (Wandsworth and Richmond) Red Route Experimental Traffic Order 1996 S.I. 1996/3254
- Secure Accommodation (Scotland) Regulations 1996 S.I. 1996/3255
- Residential Establishments – Child Care (Scotland) Regulations 1996 S.I. 1996/3256
- Adoption Allowance (Scotland) Regulations 1996 S.I. 1996/3257
- Emergency Child Protection Measures (Scotland) Regulations 1996 S.I. 1996/3258
- Refuges for Children (Scotland) Regulations 1996 S.I. 1996/3259
- Children's Hearings (Transmission of Information etc.) (Scotland) Regulations 1996 S.I. 1996/3260
- Children's Hearings (Scotland) Rules 1996 S.I. 1996/3261
- Arrangements to Look After Children (Scotland) Regulations 1996 S.I. 1996/3262
- Fostering of Children (Scotland) Regulations 1996 S.I. 1996/3263
- Markets, Sales and Lairs (Amendment) Order 1996 S.I. 1996/3265
- Adoption Agencies (Scotland) Regulations 1996 S.I. 1996/3266
- Children (Reciprocal Enforcement of Prescribed Orders etc. (England and Wales and Northern Ireland)) (Scotland) Regulations 1996 S.I. 1996/3267
- Specified Bovine Material (No. 3) (Amendment) (No. 2) Order 1996 S.I. 1996/3268
- Medicines (Phenacetin Prohibition) (Revocation) Order 1996 S.I. 1996/3269
- Firearms (Amendment) Act 1988 (Firearms Consultative Committee) Order 1996 S.I. 1996/3272
- Amusements with Prizes (Variation of Monetary Limits) (Scotland) Order 1996 S.I. 1996/3273
- Housing Accommodation and Homelessness(Persons subject to Immigration Control) Order(Northern Ireland) 1996 S.I. 1996/3274
- Gas (Extent of Domestic Supply Licences) (Amendment) Order 1996 S.I. 1996/3275
- Animals (Scientific Procedures) Act 1986 (Appropriate Methods of Humane Killing) Order 1996 S.I. 1996/3278

== See also ==
- List of statutory instruments of the United Kingdom
