= European Parliamentary Elections Act =

European Parliamentary Elections Act may refer to

- European Parliamentary Elections Act 1993
- European Parliamentary Elections Act 1999
- European Parliamentary Elections Act 2002
- European Parliamentary and Local Elections (Pilots) Act 2004
