= List of Consolidated Fund Acts from the 20th century =

This is a list of Consolidated Fund Acts from the 20th century.

== List ==
=== 20th century ===
==== 1900s ====
- The Consolidated Fund (No. 1) Act 1900 (Note: The Acts of Parliament (Commencement) Act 1793.) (63 & 64 Vict. c. 1)
  - An Act to apply a sum out of the Consolidated Fund to the service of the year ending on the thirty-first day of March one thousand nine hundred.
  - Royal assent/Commencement: 23 February 1900; Repeal date: 21 December 1908 (by the Statute Law Revision Act 1908)
- The Consolidated Fund (No. 2) Act 1900 (63 & 64 Vict. c. 3)
  - An Act to apply certain sums out of the Consolidated Fund to the service of the years ending on the thirty-first day of March one thousand eight hundred and ninety-nine, one thousand nine hundred, and one thousand nine hundred and one.
  - Royal assent/Commencement: 27 March 1900; Repeal date: 21 December 1908 (by the Statute Law Revision Act 1908)
- The Consolidated Fund Act (No. 1) 1901 (1 Edw. 7. c. 1)
  - An Act to apply certain sums out of the Consolidated Fund to the service of the years ending on the thirty-first day of March one thousand nine hundred, one thousand nine hundred and one, and one thousand nine hundred and two.
  - Royal assent/Commencement: 29 March 1901; Repeal date: 22 December 1927 (by the Statute Law Revision Act 1927)
- The Consolidated Fund (No. 2) Act 1901 (1 Edw. 7. c. 6)
  - An Act to apply a sum out of the Consolidated Fund to the service of the year ending on the thirty-first day of March one thousand nine hundred and two.
  - Royal assent/Commencement: 2 July 1901; Repeal date: 22 December 1927 (by the Statute Law Revision Act 1927)
- The Consolidated Fund (No. 1) Act 1902 (2 Edw. 7. c. 1)
  - An Act to apply certain sums out of the Consolidated Fund to the service of the years ending on the thirty-first day of March one thousand nine hundred and one, one thousand nine hundred and two, and one thousand nine hundred and three.
  - Royal assent/Commencement: 21 March 1902; Repeal date: 22 December 1927 (by the Statute Law Revision Act 1927)
- The Consolidated Fund (No. 1) Act 1903 (3 Edw. 7. c. 3)
  - An Act to apply certain sums out of the Consolidated Fund to the service of the years ending on the thirty-first day of March one thousand nine hundred and two, one thousand nine hundred and three, and one thousand nine hundred and four.
  - Royal assent/Commencement: 27 March 1903; Repeal date: 22 December 1927 (by the Statute Law Revision Act 1927)
- The Consolidated Fund (No. 1) Act 1904 (4 Edw. 7. c. 1)
  - An Act to apply certain sums out of the Consolidated Fund to the service of the years ending on the thirty-first day of March one thousand nine hundred and four and one thousand nine hundred and five.
  - Royal assent/Commencement: 29 March 1904; Repeal date: 22 December 1927 (by the Statute Law Revision Act 1927)
- The Consolidated Fund (No. 1) Act 1905 (5 Edw. 7. c. 1)
  - An Act to apply certain sums out of the Consolidated Fund to the service of the years ending on the thirty first day of March one thousand nine hundred and five and one thousand nine hundred and six.
  - Royal assent/Commencement: 30 March 1905; Repeal date: 22 December 1927 (by the Statute Law Revision Act 1927)
- The Consolidated Fund (No. 2) Act 1905 (5 Edw. 7. c. 6)
  - An Act to apply a sum out of the Consolidated Fund to the service of the year ending on the thirty-first day of March one thousand nine hundred and six.
  - Royal assent/Commencement: 11 July 1905; Repeal date: 22 December 1927 (by the Statute Law Revision Act 1927)
- The Consolidated Fund (No. 1) Act 1906 (6 Edw. 7. c. 1)
  - An Act to apply certain sums out of the Consolidated Fund to the service of the years ending on the thirty- first day of March one thousand nine hundred and six and one thousand nine hundred and seven.
  - Royal assent/Commencement: 30 March 1906; Repeal date: 22 December 1927 (by the Statute Law Revision Act 1927)
- The Consolidated Fund (No. 1) Act 1907 (7 Edw. 7. c. 1)
  - An Act to apply certain sums out of the Consolidated Fund to the service of the years ending on the thirty-first day of March one thousand nine hundred and seven and one thousand nine hundred and eight.
  - Royal assent/Commencement: 22 March 1907; Repeal date: 22 December 1927 (by the Statute Law Revision Act 1927)
- The Consolidated Fund (No. 1) Act 1908 (8 Edw. 7. c. 1)
  - An Act to apply certain sums out of the Consolidated Fund to the service of the years ending on the thirty-first day of March one thousand nine hundred and eight and one thousand nine hundred and nine.
  - Royal assent/Commencement: 27 March 1908; Repeal date: 22 December 1927 (by the Statute Law Revision Act 1927)
- The Consolidated Fund (No. 1) Act 1909 (9 Edw. 7. c. 1)
  - An Act to apply a sum out of the Consolidated Fund to the service of the year ending on the thirty-first day of March one thousand nine hundred and nine.
  - Royal assent/Commencement: 15 March 1909; Repeal date: 22 December 1927 (by the Statute Law Revision Act 1927)
- The Consolidated Fund (No. 2) Act 1909 (9 Edw. 7. c. 2)
  - An Act to apply certain sums out of the Consolidated Fund to the service of the years ending on the thirty-first day of March one thousand nine hundred and eight, one thousand nine hundred and nine, and one thousand nine hundred and ten.
  - Royal assent/Commencement: 30 March 1909; Repeal date: 22 December 1927 (by the Statute Law Revision Act 1927)

==== 1910s ====
- The Consolidated Fund (No. 1) Act 1910 (10 Edw. 7 & 1 Geo. 5. c. 4)
  - An Act to apply certain sums out of the Consolidated Fund to the service of the years ending on the thirty-first day of March one thousand nine hundred and nine, one thousand nine hundred and ten, and one thousand nine hundred and eleven.
  - Royal assent/Commencement: 24 March 1910; Repeal date: 22 December 1927 (by the Statute Law Revision Act 1927)
- The Consolidated Fund (No. 2) Act 1910 (10 Edw. 7 & 1 Geo. 5. c. 9)
  - An Act to apply a sum out of the Consolidated Fund to the service of the year ending on the thirty-first day of March one thousand nine hundred and eleven.
  - Royal assent/Commencement: 17 June 1910; Repeal date: 22 December 1927 (by the Statute Law Revision Act 1927)
- The Consolidated Fund (No. 1) Act 1911 (1 & 2 Geo. 5. c. 1)
  - An Act to apply certain sums out of the Consolidated Fund to the service of the years ending on the thirty-first day of March one thousand nine hundred and ten, one thousand nine hundred and eleven, and one thousand nine hundred and twelve.
  - Royal assent/Commencement: 29 March 1911; Repeal date: 22 December 1927 (by the Statute Law Revision Act 1927)
- The Consolidated Fund (No. 2) Act 1911 (1 & 2 Geo. 5. c. 5)
  - An Act to apply a sum out of the Consolidated Fund to the service of the year ending on the thirty-first day of March one thousand nine hundred and twelve.
  - Royal assent/Commencement: 29 June 1911; Repeal date: 22 December 1927 (by the Statute Law Revision Act 1927)
- The Consolidated Fund (No. 1) Act 1912 (2 & 3 Geo. 5. c. 1)
  - An Act to apply certain sums out of the Consolidated Fund to the service of the years ending on the thirty-first day of March one thousand nine hundred and eleven, one thousand nine hundred and twelve, and one thousand nine hundred and thirteen.
  - Royal assent/Commencement: 28 March 1912; Repeal date: 22 December 1927 (by the Statute Law Revision Act 1927)
- The Consolidated Fund (No. 1) Act 1913 (3 & 4 Geo. 5. c. 1)
  - An Act to apply a sum out of the Consolidated Fund to the service of the year ending on the thirty-first day of March one thousand nine hundred and fourteen.
  - Royal assent/Commencement: 28 March 1913; Repeal date: 22 December 1927 (by the Statute Law Revision Act 1927)
- The Consolidated Fund (No. 2) Act 1913 (3 & 4 Geo. 5. c. 5)
  - An Act to apply a sum out of the Consolidated Fund to the service of the year ending on the thirty-first day of March one thousand nine hundred and fourteen.
  - Royal assent/Commencement: 4 July 1913; Repeal date: 22 December 1927 (by the Statute Law Revision Act 1927)
- The Consolidated Fund (No. 1) Act 1914 (4 & 5 Geo. 5. c. 1)
  - An Act to apply certain sums out of the Consolidated Fund to the service of the years ending on the thirty-first day of March one thousand nine hundred and fourteen and one thousand nine hundred and fifteen.
  - Royal assent/Commencement: 31 March 1914; Repeal date: 22 December 1927 (by the Statute Law Revision Act 1927)
- The Consolidated Fund (No. 1) Act 1914 (5 & 6 Geo. 5. c. 6)
  - An Act to apply a sum out of the Consolidated Fund to the service of the year ending on the thirty-first day of March one thousand nine hundred and fifteen.
  - Royal assent/Commencement: 27 November 1914; Repeal date: 22 December 1927 (by the Statute Law Revision Act 1927)
- The Consolidated Fund (No. 2) Act 1915 (5 & 6 Geo. 5. c. 33)
  - An Act to apply certain sums out of the Consolidated Fund to the service of the years ending on the thirty-first day of March one thousand nine hundred and fourteen, one thousand nine hundred and fifteen, and one thousand nine hundred and sixteen.
  - Royal assent/Commencement: 16 March 1915; Repeal date: 22 December 1927 (by the Statute Law Revision Act 1927)
- The Consolidated Fund (No. 3) Act 1915 (5 & 6 Geo. 5. c. 53)
  - An Act to apply a sum out or the Consolidated Fund to the service of the year ending on the thirty-first day of March one thousand nine hundred and sixteen.
  - Royal assent/Commencement: 24 June 1915; Repeal date: 22 December 1927 (by the Statute Law Revision Act 1927)
- The Consolidated Fund (No. 4) Act 1915 (5 & 6 Geo. 5. c. 80)
  - An Act to apply a sum out of the Consolidated Fund to the service of the year ending on the thirty-first day of March one thousand nine hundred and sixteen
  - Royal assent/Commencement: 29 September 1915; Repeal date: 22 December 1927 (by the Statute Law Revision Act 1927)
- The Consolidated Fund (No. 1) Act 1916 (6 & 7 Geo. 5. c. 1)
  - An Act to apply certain sums out of the Consolidated Fund to the service of the years ending on the thirty-first day of March one thousand nine hundred and sixteen and one thousand nine hundred and seventeen.
  - Royal assent/Commencement: 2 March 1916; Repeal date: 22 December 1927 (by the Statute Law Revision Act 1927)
- The Consolidated Fund (No. 2) Act 1916 (6 & 7 Geo. 5. c. 3)
  - An Act to apply certain sums out of the Consolidated Fund to the service of the years ending on the thirty-first day of March one thousand nine hundred and sixteen and one thousand nine hundred and seventeen.
  - Royal assent/Commencement: 30 March 1916; Repeal date: 22 December 1927 (by the Statute Law Revision Act 1927)
- The Consolidated Fund (No. 3) Act 1916 (6 & 7 Geo. 5. c. 16)
  - An Act to apply a sum out of the Consolidated Fund to the service of the year ending on the thirty-first day of March one thousand nine hundred and seventeen.
  - Royal assent/Commencement: 1 June 1916; Repeal date: 22 December 1927 (by the Statute Law Revision Act 1927)
- The Consolidated Fund (No. 4) Act 1916 (6 & 7 Geo. 5. c. 30)
  - An Act to apply a sum out of the Consolidated Fund to the service of the year ending on the thirty-first day of March one thousand nine hundred and seventeen.
  - Royal assent/Commencement: 3 August 1916; Repeal date: 22 December 1927 (by the Statute Law Revision Act 1927)
- The Consolidated Fund (No. 5) Act 1916 (6 & 7 Geo. 5. c. 48)
  - An Act to apply certain sums out of the Consolidated Fund to the service of the years ending on the thirty-first day of March one thousand nine hundred and fifteen and one thousand nine hundred and seventeen.
  - Royal assent/Commencement: 31 October 1916; Repeal date: 22 December 1927 (by the Statute Law Revision Act 1927)
- The Consolidated Fund (No. 1) Act 1917 (7 & 8 Geo. 5. c. 1)
  - An Act to apply certain sums out of the Consolidated Fund to the service of the years ending on the thirty-first day of March one thousand nine hundred and seventeen and one thousand nine hundred and eighteen.
  - Royal assent/Commencement: 28 February 1917; Repeal date: 22 December 1927 (by the Statute Law Revision Act 1927)
- The Consolidated Fund (No. 2) Act 1917 (7 & 8 Geo. 5. c. 7)
  - An Act to apply certain sums out of the Consolidated Fund to the service of the years ending on the thirty-first day of March one thousand nine hundred and seventeen and one thousand nine hundred and eighteen.
  - Royal assent/Commencement: 28 March 1917; Repeal date: 22 December 1927 (by the Statute Law Revision Act 1927)
- The Consolidated Fund (No. 3) Act 1917 (7 & 8 Geo. 5. c. 17)
  - An Act to apply a sum out of the Consolidated Fund to the service of the year ending on the thirty-first day of March one thousand nine hundred and eighteen.
  - Royal assent/Commencement: 17 May 1917; Repeal date: 22 December 1927 (by the Statute Law Revision Act 1927)
- The Consolidated Fund (No. 4) Act 1917 (7 & 8 Geo. 5. c. 33)
  - An Act to apply a sum out of the Consolidated Fund to the service of the year ending on the thirty-first day of March one thousand nine hundred and eighteen.
  - Royal assent/Commencement: 2 August 1917; Repeal date: 22 December 1927 (by the Statute Law Revision Act 1927)
- The Consolidated Fund (No. 5) Act 1917 (7 & 8 Geo. 5. c. 49)
  - An Act to apply certain sums out of the Consolidated Fund to the service of the years ending on the thirty-first day of March one thousand nine hundred and sixteen and one thousand nine hundred and eighteen.
  - Royal assent/Commencement: 8 November 1917; Repeal date: 22 December 1927 (by the Statute Law Revision Act 1927)
- The Consolidated Fund (No. 1) Act 1918 (8 & 9 Geo. 5. c. 1)
  - An Act to apply certain sums out of the Consolidated Fund to the service of the years ending on the thirty-first day of March one thousand nine hundred and eighteen and one thousand nine hundred and nineteen.
  - Royal assent/Commencement: 19 March 1918; Repeal date: 22 December 1927 (by the Statute Law Revision Act 1927)
- The Consolidated Fund (No. 2) Act 1918 (8 & 9 Geo. 5. c. 11)
  - An Act to apply a sum out of the Consolidated Fund to the service of the year ending on the thirty-first day of March one thousand nine hundred and nineteen.
  - Royal assent/Commencement: 27 June 1918; Repeal date: 22 December 1927 (by the Statute Law Revision Act 1927)
- The Consolidated Fund (No. 3) Act 1918 (8 & 9 Geo. 5. c. 37)
  - An Act to apply a sum out of the Consolidated Fund to the service of the year ending on the thirty-first day of March one thousand nine hundred and nineteen.
  - Royal assent/Commencement: 8 August 1918; Repeal date: 22 December 1927 (by the Statute Law Revision Act 1927)
- The Consolidated Fund (No. 1) Act 1919 (9 & 10 Geo. 5. c. 5)
  - An Act to apply certain sums out of the Consolidated Fund to the service of the years ending on the thirty-first day of March one thousand nine hundred and nineteen and one thousand nine hundred and twenty.
  - Royal assent/Commencement: 28 March 1919; Repeal date: 22 December 1927 (by the Statute Law Revision Act 1927)
- The Consolidated Fund (No. 2) Act 1919 (9 & 10 Geo. 5. c. 49)
  - An Act to apply certain sums out of the Consolidated Fund to the service of the years ending on the thirty-first day of March one thousand nine hundred and eighteen and one thousand nine hundred and twenty.
  - Royal assent/Commencement: 15 August 1919; Repeal date: 22 December 1927 (by the Statute Law Revision Act 1927)

==== 1920s ====
- The Consolidated Fund (No. 1) Act 1920 (10 & 11 Geo. 5. c. 1)
  - An Act to apply certain sums out of the Consolidated Fund to the service of the years ending on the thirty-first day of March one thousand nine hundred and twenty and one thousand nine hundred and twenty-one.
  - Royal assent/Commencement: 26 March 1920; Repeal date: 22 December 1927 (by the Statute Law Revision Act 1927)
- The Consolidated Fund (No. 1) Act 1921 (11 & 12 Geo. 5. c. 2)
  - An Act to apply a sum out of the Consolidated Fund to the service of the year ending on the thirty-first day of March on thousand nine hundred and twenty-one.
  - Royal assent/Commencement: 8 March 1921; Repeal date: 23 May 1950 (by the Statute Law Revision Act 1950)
- The Consolidated Fund (No. 2) Act 1921 (11 & 12 Geo. 5. c. 3)
  - An Act to apply certain sums out of the Consolidated Fund to the service of the years ending on the thirty-first day of March, one thousand nine hundred and twenty, one thousand nine hundred and twenty-one, and one thousand nine hundred and twenty-two.
  - Royal assent/Commencement: 24 March 1921; Repeal date: 23 May 1950 (by the Statute Law Revision Act 1950)
- The Consolidated Fund (No. 1) Act 1922 (12 & 13 Geo. 5. c. 1)
  - An Act to apply a sum out of the Consolidated Fund to the service of the year ending on the thirty-first day of March one thousand nine hundred and twenty-two.
  - Royal assent/Commencement: 2 March 1922; Repeal date: 23 May 1950 (by the Statute Law Revision Act 1950)
- The Consolidated Fund (No. 2) Act 1922 (12 & 13 Geo. 5. c. 3)
  - An Act to apply certain sums out of the Consolidated Fund to the service of the years ending on the thirty-first day of March, one thousand nine hundred and twenty-one, one thousand nine hundred and twenty-two, and one thousand nine hundred and twenty-three.
  - Royal assent/Commencement: 29 March 1922; Repeal date: 23 May 1950 (by the Statute Law Revision Act 1950)
- The Consolidated Fund (No. 1) Act 1923 (13 & 14 Geo. 5. c. 1)
  - An Act to apply certain sums out of the Consolidated Fund to the service of the years ending on the thirty-first day of March one thousand nine hundred and twenty-three, and one thousand nine hundred and twenty-four.
  - Royal assent/Commencement: 29 March 1923; Repeal date: 23 May 1950 (by the Statute Law Revision Act 1950)
- The Consolidated Fund (No. 1) Act 1924 (14 & 15 Geo. 5. c. 2)
  - An Act to apply a sum out of the Consolidated Fund to the service of the year-ending on the thirty-first day of March, one thousand nine hundred and twenty-four.
  - Royal assent/Commencement: 6 March 1924; Repeal date: 23 May 1950 (by the Statute Law Revision Act 1950)
- The Consolidated Fund (No. 2) Act 1924 (14 & 15 Geo. 5. c. 4)
  - An Act to apply certain sums out of the Consolidated Fund to the service of the years ending on the thirty-first day of March, one thousand nine hundred and twenty-three, one thousand nine hundred and twenty-four, and one thousand nine hundred and twenty-five.
  - Royal assent/Commencement: 28 March 1924; Repeal date: 23 May 1950 (by the Statute Law Revision Act 1950)
- The Consolidated Fund (No. 1) Act 1925 (15 & 16 Geo. 5. c. 8)
  - An Act to apply certain sums out of the Consolidated Fund to the service of the years ending on the thirty-first day of March, one thousand nine hundred and twenty-five, and one thousand nine hundred and twenty-six.
  - Royal assent/Commencement: 27 March 1925; Repeal date: 23 May 1950 (by the Statute Law Revision Act 1950)
- The Consolidated Fund (No. 1) Act 1926 (16 & 17 Geo. 5. c. 1)
  - An Act to apply certain sums out of the Consolidated Fund to the service of the years ending on the thirty-first day of March, one thousand nine hundred and twenty-five, one thousand nine hundred and twenty-six, and one thousand nine hundred and twenty-seven.
  - Royal assent/Commencement: 26 March 1926; Repeal date: 23 May 1950 (by the Statute Law Revision Act 1950)
- The Consolidated Fund (No. 1) Act 1927 (17 & 18 Geo. 5. c. 2)
  - An Act to apply certain sums out of the Consolidated Fund to the service of the years ending on the thirty-first day of March, one thousand nine hundred and twenty-six, one thousand nine hundred and twenty-seven, and one thousand nine hundred and twenty-eight.
  - Royal assent/Commencement: 29 March 1927; Repeal date: 23 May 1950 (by the Statute Law Revision Act 1950)
- The Consolidated Fund (No. 1) Act 1928 (18 & 19 Geo. 5. c. 1)
  - An Act to apply certain sums out of the Consolidated Fund to the service of the years ending on the thirty-first day of March, one thousand nine hundred and twenty-seven, one thousand nine hundred and twenty-eight and one thousand nine hundred and twenty-nine.
  - Royal assent/Commencement: 28 March 1928; Repeal date: 23 May 1950 (by the Statute Law Revision Act 1950)
- The Consolidated Fund (No. 1) Act 1928 (19 & 20 Geo. 5. c. 2)
  - An Act to apply a sum out of the Consolidated Fund to the service of the year ending on the thirty-first day of March, one thousand nine hundred and twenty-nine.
  - Royal assent/Commencement: 19 December 1928; Repeal date: 23 May 1950 (by the Statute Law Revision Act 1950)
- The Consolidated Fund (No. 2) Act 1929 (19 & 20 Geo. 5. c. 10)
  - An Act to apply certain sums out of the Consolidated Fund to the service of the years ending on the thirty-first day of March, one thousand nine hundred and twenty-eight, one thousand nine hundred and twenty-nine, and one thousand nine hundred and thirty.
  - Royal assent/Commencement: 27 March 1929; Repeal date: 23 May 1950 (by the Statute Law Revision Act 1950)
- The Consolidated Fund (No. 1) Act 1929 (20 & 21 Geo. 5. c. 11)
  - An Act to apply a sum out of the Consolidated Fund to the service of the year ending on the thirty-first day of March, one thousand nine hundred and thirty.
  - Royal assent/Commencement: 20 December 1929; Repeal date: 23 May 1950 (by the Statute Law Revision Act 1950)

==== 1930s ====
- The Consolidated Fund (No. 2) Act 1930 (20 & 21 Geo. 5. c. 14)
  - An Act to apply a sum out of the Consolidated Fund to the service of the year ending on the thirty-first day of March, one thousand nine hundred and thirty.
  - Royal assent/Commencement: 6 February 1930; Repeal date: 23 May 1950 (by the Statute Law Revision Act 1950)
- The Consolidated Fund (No. 3) Act 1930 (20 & 21 Geo. 5. c. 18)
  - An Act to apply certain sums out of the Consolidated Fund to the service of the years ending on the thirty-first day of March, one thousand nine hundred and twenty-nine, one thousand nine hundred and thirty and one thousand nine hundred and thirty-one.
  - Royal assent/Commencement: 28 March 1930; Repeal date: 23 May 1950 (by the Statute Law Revision Act 1950)
- The Consolidated Fund (No. 1) Act 1930 (21 & 22 Geo. 5. c. 1)
  - An Act to apply a sum out of the Consolidated Fund to the service of the year ending on the thirty-first day of March, one thousand nine hundred and thirty-one.
  - Royal assent/Commencement: 19 December 1930; Repeal date: 23 May 1950 (by the Statute Law Revision Act 1950)
- The Consolidated Fund (No. 2) Act 1931 (21 & 22 Geo. 5. c. 10)
  - An Act to apply certain sums out of the Consolidated Fund to the service of the years ending on the thirty-first day of March, one thousand nine hundred and thirty, one thousand nine hundred and thirty-one and one thousand nine hundred and thirty-two.
  - Royal assent/Commencement: 27 March 1931; Repeal date: 23 May 1950 (by the Statute Law Revision Act 1950)
- The Consolidated Fund (No. 1) Act 1932 (22 & 23 Geo. 5. c. 14)
  - An Act to apply certain sums out of the Consolidated Fund to the service of the years ending on the thirty-first day of March, one thousand nine hundred and thirty-one, one thousand nine hundred and thirty-two and one thousand nine hundred and thirty-three.
  - Royal assent/Commencement: 24 March 1932; Repeal date: 23 May 1950 (by the Statute Law Revision Act 1950)
- The Consolidated Fund (No. 1) Act 1932 (23 & 24 Geo. 5. c. 1)
  - An Act to apply a sum out of the Consolidated Fund to the service of the year ending on the thirty-first day of March, one thousand nine hundred and thirty-three.
  - Royal assent/Commencement: 22 December 1932; Repeal date: 23 May 1950 (by the Statute Law Revision Act 1950)
- The Consolidated Fund (No. 2) Act 1933 (23 & 24 Geo. 5. c. 3)
  - An Act to apply certain sums out of the Consolidated Fund to the service of the years ending on the thirty-first day of March, one thousand nine hundred and thirty-two, one thousand nine hundred and thirty-three and one thousand nine hundred and thirty-four.
  - Royal assent/Commencement: 29 March 1933; Repeal date: 23 May 1950 (by the Statute Law Revision Act 1950)
- The Consolidated Fund (No. 1) Act 1934 (24 & 25 Geo. 5. c. 3)
  - An Act to apply certain sums out of the Consolidated Fund to the service of the years ending on the thirty-first day of March, one thousand nine hundred and thirty-three, one thousand nine hundred and thirty-four and one thousand nine hundred and thirty-five.
  - Royal assent/Commencement: 28 March 1934; Repeal date: 23 May 1950 (by the Statute Law Revision Act 1950)
- The Consolidated Fund (No. 1) Act 1935 (25 & 26 Geo. 5. c. 4)
  - An Act to apply a sum out of the Consolidated Fund to the service of the year ending on the thirty-first day of March, one thousand nine hundred and thirty-five.
  - Royal assent/Commencement: 15 February 1935; Repeal date: 23 May 1950 (by the Statute Law Revision Act 1950)
- The Consolidated Fund (No. 2) Act 1935 (25 & 26 Geo. 5. c. 10)
  - An Act to apply certain sums out of the Consolidated Fund to the service of the years ending on the thirty-first day of March, one thousand nine hundred and thirty-five and one thousand nine hundred and thirty-six.
  - Royal assent/Commencement: 28 March 1935; Repeal date: 23 May 1950 (by the Statute Law Revision Act 1950)
- The Consolidated Fund (No. 1) Act 1936 (26 Geo. 5 & 1 Edw. 8. c. 8)
  - An Act to apply a sum out of the Consolidated Fund to the service of the year ending on the thirty-first day of March, one thousand nine hundred and thirty-six.
  - Royal assent/Commencement: 19 March 1936; Repeal date: 23 May 1950 (by the Statute Law Revision Act 1950)
- The Consolidated Fund (No. 2) Act 1936 (26 Geo. 5 & 1 Edw. 8. c. 11)
  - An Act to apply certain sums out of the Consolidated Fund to the service of the years ending on the thirty-first day of March, one thousand nine hundred and thirty-five, one thousand nine hundred and thirty-six and one thousand nine hundred and thirty-seven.
  - Royal assent/Commencement: 30 March 1936; Repeal date: 23 May 1950 (by the Statute Law Revision Act 1950)
- The Consolidated Fund (No. 1) Act 1937 (1 Edw. 8 & 1 Geo. 6. c. 7)
  - An Act to apply a sum out of the Consolidated Fund to the service of the year ending on the thirty-first day of March, one thousand nine hundred and thirty-seven.
  - Royal assent/Commencement: 18 February 1937; Repeal date: 23 May 1950 (by the Statute Law Revision Act 1950)
- The Consolidated Fund (No. 2) Act 1937 (1 Edw. 8 & 1 Geo. 6. c. 20)
  - An Act to apply certain sums out of the Consolidated Fund to the service of the years ending on the thirty-first day of March, one thousand nine hundred and thirty-six, one thousand nine hundred and thirty-seven, and one thousand nine hundred and thirty-eight.
  - Royal assent/Commencement: 25 March 1937; Repeal date: 23 May 1950 (by the Statute Law Revision Act 1950)
- The Consolidated Fund (No. 1) Act 1938 (1 & 2 Geo. 6. c. 9)
  - An Act to apply certain sums out of the Consolidates Fund to the service of the years ending on the thirty-first day of March, one thousand nine hundred and thirty-seven, one thousand nine hundred and thirty-eight and one thousand nine hundred and thirty-nine.
  - Royal assent/Commencement: 30 March 1938; Repeal date: 23 May 1950 (by the Statute Law Revision Act 1950)
- The Consolidated Fund (No. 1) Act 1939 (2 & 3 Geo. 6. c. 12)
  - An Act to apply certain sums out of the Consolidated Fund to the service of the years ending on the thirty-first day of March, one thousand nine hundred and thirty-eight, one thousand nine hundred and thirty-nine and one thousand nine hundred and forty.
  - Royal assent/Commencement: 29 March 1939; Repeal date: 23 May 1950 (by the Statute Law Revision Act 1950)

==== 1940s ====
- The Consolidated Fund (No. 1) Act 1940 (3 & 4 Geo. 6. c. 11)
  - An Act to apply certain sums out of the Consolidated Fund to the service of the years ending on the thirty-first day of March, one thousand nine hundred and thirty-nine, one thousand nine hundred and forty and one thousand nine hundred and forty-one.
  - Royal assent/Commencement: 21 March 1940; Repeal date: 23 May 1950 (by the Statute Law Revision Act 1950)
- The Consolidated Fund (No. 2) Act 1940 (3 & 4 Geo. 6. c. 39)
  - An Act to apply a sum out of the Consolidated Fund to the service of the year ending on the thirty-first day of March, one thousand nine hundred and forty-one.
  - Royal assent/Commencement: 17 July 1940; Repeal date: 23 May 1950 (by the Statute Law Revision Act 1950)
- The Consolidated Fund (No. 3) Act 1940 (3 & 4 Geo. 6. c. 52)
  - An Act to apply a sum out of the Consolidated Fund to the service of the year ending on the thirty-first day of March, one thousand nine hundred and forty-one.
  - Royal assent/Commencement: 24 October 1940; Repeal date: 23 May 1950 (by the Statute Law Revision Act 1950)
- The Consolidated Fund (No. 1) Act 1941 (4 & 5 Geo. 6. c. 6)
  - An Act to apply certain sums out of the Consolidated Fund to the service of the years ending on the thirty-first day of March, one thousand nine hundred and forty-one and one thousand nine hundred and forty-two.
  - Royal assent/Commencement: 12 February 1941; Repeal date: 23 May 1950 (by the Statute Law Revision Act 1950)
- The Consolidated Fund (No. 2) Act 1941 (4 & 5 Geo. 6. c. 9)
  - An Act to apply certain sums out of the Consolidated Fund to the service of the years ending on the thirty-first day of March, one thousand nine hundred and forty-one and one thousand nine hundred and forty-two.
  - Royal assent/Commencement: 26 March 1941; Repeal date: 23 May 1950 (by the Statute Law Revision Act 1950)
- The Consolidated Fund (No. 3) Act 1941 (4 & 5 Geo. 6. c. 26)
  - An Act to apply a sum out of the Consolidated Fund to the service of the year ending on the thirty-first day of March, one thousand nine hundred and forty-two.
  - Royal assent/Commencement: 2 July 1941; Repeal date: 23 May 1950 (by the Statute Law Revision Act 1950)
- The Consolidated Fund (No. 1) Act 1941 (5 & 6 Geo. 6. c. 2)
  - An Act to apply a sun out of the Consolidated Fund to the service of the year ending on the thirty-first day of March, one thousand nine hundred and forty-two.
  - Royal assent/Commencement: 18 December 1941; Repeal date: 23 May 1950 (by the Statute Law Revision Act 1950)
- The Consolidated Fund (No. 2) Act 1942 (5 & 6 Geo. 6. c. 12)
  - An Act to apply certain sums out of the Consolidated Fund to the service of the years ending on the thirty-first day of March, one thousand nine hundred and forty-two and one thousand nine hundred and forty-three.
  - Royal assent/Commencement: 19 March 1942; Repeal date: 23 May 1950 (by the Statute Law Revision Act 1950)
- The Consolidated Fund (No. 3) Act 1942 (5 & 6 Geo. 6. c. 22)
  - An Act to apply a sum out of the Consolidated Fund to the service of the Year ending on the thirty-first day of March, one thousand nine hundred and forty-three.
  - Royal assent/Commencement: 24 June 1942; Repeal date: 23 May 1950 (by the Statute Law Revision Act 1950)
- The Consolidated Fund (No. 1) Act 1943 (6 & 7 Geo. 6. c. 4)
  - An Act to apply certain sums out of the Consolidated Fund to the service of the years ending on the thirty-first day of March, one thousand nine hundred and forty-three and one thousand nine hundred and forty-four.
  - Royal assent/Commencement: 4 February 1943; Repeal date: 23 May 1950 (by the Statute Law Revision Act 1950)
- The Consolidated Fund (No. 2) Act 1943 (6 & 7 Geo. 6. c. 11)
  - An Act to apply certain sums out of the Consolidated Fund to the service of the years ending on the thirty-first day of March, one thousand nine hundred and forty-three and one thousand nine hundred and forty-four.
  - Royal assent/Commencement: 25 March 1943; Repeal date: 23 May 1950 (by the Statute Law Revision Act 1950)
- The Consolidated Fund (No. 3) Act 1943 (6 & 7 Geo. 6. c. 20)
  - An Act to apply a sum out of the Consolidated Fund to the service of the year ending on the thirty-first day of March, one thousand nine hundred and forty-four.
  - Royal assent/Commencement: 3 June 1943; Repeal date: 23 May 1950 (by the Statute Law Revision Act 1950)
- The Consolidated Fund (No. 1) Act 1944 (7 & 8 Geo. 6. c. 4)
  - An Act to apply certain sums out of the Consolidated Fund to the service of the years ending on the thirty-first day of March, one thousand nine hundred and forty-four and one thousand nine hundred and forty-five.
  - Royal assent/Commencement: 1 February 1944; Repeal date: 23 May 1950 (by the Statute Law Revision Act 1950)
- The Consolidated Fund (No. 2) Act 1944 (7 & 8 Geo. 6. c. 17)
  - An Act to apply certain sums out of the Consolidated Fund to the service of the years ending on the thirty-first day of March, one thousand nine hundred and forty-four and one thousand nine hundred and forty-five.
  - Royal assent/Commencement: 29 March 1944; Repeal date: 23 May 1950 (by the Statute Law Revision Act 1950)
- The Consolidated Fund (No. 3) Act 1944 (7 & 8 Geo. 6. c. 20)
  - An Act to apply a sum out of the Consolidated Fund to the service of the year ending on the thirty-first day of March, one thousand nine hundred and forty-five.
  - Royal assent/Commencement: 24 May 1944; Repeal date: 23 May 1950 (by the Statute Law Revision Act 1950)
- The Consolidated Fund (No. 1) Act 1944 (8 & 9 Geo. 6. c. 1)
  - An Act to apply a sum out of the Consolidated Fund to the service of the year ending on the thirty-first day of March, one thousand nine hundred and forty-five.
  - Royal assent/Commencement: 21 December 1944; Repeal date: 23 May 1950 (by the Statute Law Revision Act 1950)
- The Consolidated Fund (No. 2) Act 1945 (8 & 9 Geo. 6. c. 4)
  - An Act to apply certain sums out of the Consolidated Fund to the service of the years ending on the thirty-first day of March, one thousand nine hundred and forty-five and one thousand nine hundred and forty-six.
  - Royal assent/Commencement: 30 January 1945; Repeal date: 23 May 1950 (by the Statute Law Revision Act 1950)
- The Consolidated Fund (No. 3) Act 1945 (8 & 9 Geo. 6. c. 13)
  - An Act to apply certain sums out of the Consolidated Fund to the service of the years ending on the thirty-first day of March, one thousand nine hundred and forty-five and one thousand nine hundred and forty-six.
  - Royal assent/Commencement: 28 March 1945; Repeal date: 23 May 1950 (by the Statute Law Revision Act 1950)
- The Consolidated Fund (No. 1) Act 1945 (9 & 10 Geo. 6. c. 4)
  - An Act to apply a sum out of the Consolidated Fund to the service of the year ending on the thirty-first day of March, one thousand nine hundred and forty-six.
  - Royal assent/Commencement: 31 October 1945; Repeal date: 23 May 1950 (by the Statute Law Revision Act 1950)
- The Consolidated Fund (No. 1) Act 1946 (9 & 10 Geo. 6. c. 33)
  - An Act to apply certain sums out of the Consolidated Fund to the service of the years ending on the thirty-first day of March, one thousand nine hundred and forty-six and one thousand nine hundred and forty-seven.
  - Royal assent/Commencement: 26 March 1946; Repeal date: 23 May 1950 (by the Statute Law Revision Act 1950)
- The Consolidated Fund (No. 1) Act 1947 (10 & 11 Geo. 6. c. 17)
  - An Act to apply certain sums out of the Consolidated Fund to the service of the years ending on the thirty-first day of March, one thousand nine hundred and forty-six, one thousand nine hundred and forty-seven and one thousand nine hundred and Forty-eight.
  - Royal assent/Commencement: 27 March 1947; Repeal date: 23 May 1950 (by the Statute Law Revision Act 1950)
- The Consolidated Fund (No. 1) Act 1948 (11 & 12 Geo. 6. c. 18)
  - An Act to apply certain sums out of the Consolidated Fund to the service of the years ending on the thirty-first day of March, one thousand nine hundred and forty-seven, one thousand nine hundred and forty-eight and one thousand nine hundred and forty-nine.
  - Royal assent/Commencement: 24 March 1948; Repeal date: 31 July 1964 (by the Statute Law Revision Act 1964)
- The Consolidated Fund (No. 1) Act 1949 (12, 13 & 14 Geo. 6. c. 24)
  - An Act to apply certain sums out of the Consolidated Fund to the service of the years ending on the thirty-first day of March, one thousand nine hundred and forty-eight, one thousand nine hundred and forty-nine and one thousand nine hundred and fifty.
  - Royal assent/Commencement: 29 March 1949; Repeal date: 31 July 1964 (by the Statute Law Revision Act 1964)

==== 1950s ====
- The Consolidated Fund Act 1950 (14 Geo. 6. c. 1)
  - An Act to apply certain sums out of the Consolidated Fund to the service of the years ending on the thirty-first day of March, one thousand nine hundred and forty-nine, one thousand nine hundred and fifty and one thousand nine hundred and fifty-one.
  - Royal assent/Commencement: 30 March 1950; Repeal date: 31 July 1964 (by the Statute Law Revision Act 1964)
- The Consolidated Fund Act 1951 (14 & 15 Geo. 6. c. 12)
  - An Act to apply a sum out of the Consolidated Fund to the service of the year ending on the thirty-first day of March, one thousand nine hundred and fifty-one.
  - Royal assent/Commencement: 15 February 1951; Repeal date: 31 July 1964 (by the Statute Law Revision Act 1964)
- The Consolidated Fund (No. 2) Act 1951 (14 & 15 Geo. 6. c. 16)
  - An Act to apply certain sums out of the Consolidated Fund to the service of the years ending on the thirty-first day of March, one thousand nine hundred and fifty-one and one thousand nine hundred and fifty-two.
  - Royal assent/Commencement: 21 March 1951; Repeal date: 31 July 1964 (by the Statute Law Revision Act 1964)
- The Consolidated Fund (Civil List Provisions) Act 1951 (14 & 15 Geo. 6. c. 50)
  - An Act to complete the charge on the Consolidated Fund of the provisions made by the Civil List Act, 1937. (Note: Civil List Act 1937 (1 Edw. 8 & 1 Geo. 6. c. 32))
  - Royal assent/Commencement: 1 August 1951; Repeal date: 1 April 2012 (by the Sovereign Grant Act 2011)
- The Consolidated Fund (No. 3) Act 1951 (15 & 16 Geo. 6 & 1 Eliz. 2. c. 1)
  - An Act to apply a sum out of the Consolidated Fund to the service of the year ending on the thirty-first day of March, one thousand nine hundred and fifty-two.
  - Royal assent/Commencement: 7 December 1951; Repeal date: 31 July 1964 (by the Statute Law Revision Act 1964)
- The Consolidated Fund Act 1952 (15 & 16 Geo. 6 & 1 Eliz. 2. c. 16)
  - An Act to apply certain sums out of the Consolidated Fund to the service of the years ending on the thirty-first day of March, one thousand nine hundred and fifty-two and one thousand nine hundred and fifty-three.
  - Royal assent/Commencement: 27 March 1952; Repeal date: 31 July 1964 (by the Statute Law Revision Act 1964)
- The Consolidated Fund Act 1953 (1 & 2 Eliz. 2. c. 6)
  - An Act to apply a sum out of the Consolidated Fund to the service of the year ending on the thirty-first day of March, one thousand nine hundred and fifty-three.
  - Royal assent/Commencement: 12 February 1953; Repeal date: 31 July 1964 (by the Statute Law Revision Act 1964)
- The Consolidated Fund (No. 2) Act 1953 (1 & 2 Eliz. 2. c. 8)
  - An Act to apply certain sums out of the Consolidated Fund to the service of the years ending on the thirty-first day of March, one thousand nine hundred and fifty-two, one thousand nine hundred and fifty-three and one thousand nine hundred and fifty-four.
  - Royal assent/Commencement: 26 March 1953; Repeal date: 31 July 1964 (by the Statute Law Revision Act 1964)
- The Consolidated Fund (No. 3) Act 1953 (2 & 3 Eliz. 2. c. 2)
  - An Act to apply a sum out of the Consolidated Fund to the service of the year ending on the thirty-first day of March, one thousand nine hundred and fifty-four.
  - Royal assent/Commencement: 18 December 1953; Repeal date: 31 July 1964 (by the Statute Law Revision Act 1964)
- The Consolidated Fund Act 1954 (2 & 3 Eliz. 2. c. 22)
  - An Act to apply certain sums out of the Consolidated Fund to the service of the years ending on the thirty-first day of March, one thousand nine hundred and fifty-three, one thousand nine hundred and fifty-four and one thousand nine hundred and fifty-five.
  - Royal assent/Commencement: 26 March 1954; Repeal date: 31 July 1964 (by the Statute Law Revision Act 1964)
- The Consolidated Fund Act 1955 (3 & 4 Eliz. 2. c. 3)
  - An Act to apply certain sums out of the Consolidated Fund to the service of the years ending on the thirty-first day of March, one thousand nine hundred and fifty-four, one thousand nine hundred and fifty-five and one thousand nine hundred and fifty-six.
  - Royal assent/Commencement: 29 March 1955; Repeal date: 31 July 1964 (by the Statute Law Revision Act 1964)
- The Consolidated Fund Act 1956 (4 & 5 Eliz. 2. c. 32)
  - An Act to apply certain sums out of the Consolidated Fund to the service of the years ending on the thirty-first day of March, one thousand nine hundred and fifty-five, one thousand nine hundred and fifty-six and one thousand nine hundred and fifty-seven.
  - Royal assent/Commencement: 28 March 1956; Repeal date: 31 July 1964 (by the Statute Law Revision Act 1964)
- The Consolidated Fund Act 1957 (5 & 6 Eliz. 2. c. 7)
  - An Act to apply a sum out of the Consolidated Fund to the service of the year ending on the thirty-first day of March, one thousand nine hundred and fifty-seven.
  - Royal assent/Commencement: 26 February 1957; Repeal date: 31 July 1964 (by the Statute Law Revision Act 1964)
- The Consolidated Fund (No. 2) Act 1957 (5 & 6 Eliz. 2. c. 10)
  - An Act to apply certain sums out of the Consolidated Fund to the service of the years ending on the thirty-first day of March, one thousand nine hundred and fifty-six, one thousand nine hundred and fifty-seven and one thousand nine hundred and fifty-eight.
  - Royal assent/Commencement: 21 March 1957; Repeal date: 31 July 1964 (by the Statute Law Revision Act 1964)
- The Consolidated Fund Act 1958 (6 & 7 Eliz. 2. c. 7)
  - An Act to apply a sum out of the Consolidated Fund to the service of the year ending on the thirty-first day of March, one thousand nine hundred and fifty-eight.
  - Royal assent/Commencement: 20 February 1958; Repeal date: 31 July 1964 (by the Statute Law Revision Act 1964)
- The Consolidated Fund (No. 2) Act 1958 (6 & 7 Eliz. 2. c. 18)
  - An Act to apply certain sums out of the Consolidated Fund to the service of the years ending on the thirty-first day of March one thousand nine hundred and fifty-seven one thousand nine hundred and fifty-eight and one thousand nine hundred and fifty-nine.
  - Royal assent/Commencement: 26 March 1958; Repeal date: 31 July 1964 (by the Statute Law Revision Act 1964)
- The Consolidated Fund Act 1959 (7 & 8 Eliz. 2. c. 15)
  - An Act to apply certain sums out of the Consolidated Fund to the service of the years ending on the thirty-first day of March, one thousand nine hundred and fifty-eight, one thousand nine hundred and fifty-nine and one thousand nine hundred and sixty.
  - Royal assent/Commencement: 25 March 1959; Repeal date: 31 July 1964 (by the Statute Law Revision Act 1964)

==== 1960s ====
- The Consolidated Fund Act 1960 (8 & 9 Eliz. 2. c. 10)
  - An Act to apply certain sums out of the Consolidated Fund to the service of the years ending on the thirty-first day of March, one thousand nine hundred and sixty and one thousand nine hundred and sixty-one.
  - Royal assent/Commencement: 22 March 1960; Repeal date: 31 July 1964 (by the Statute Law Revision Act 1964)
- The Consolidated Fund Act 1961 (9 & 10 Eliz. 2. c. 7)
  - An Act to apply a sum out of the Consolidated Fund to the service of the year ending on the thirty-first day of March, one thousand nine hundred and sixty-one.
  - Royal assent/Commencement: 2 March 1961; Repeal date: 31 July 1964 (by the Statute Law Revision Act 1964)
- The Consolidated Fund (No. 2) Act 1961 (9 & 10 Eliz. 2. c. 12)
  - An Act to apply certain sums out of the Consolidated Fund to the service of the years ending on the thirty-first day of March, one thousand nine hundred and sixty, one thousand nine hundred and sixty-one and one thousand nine hundred and sixty-two.
  - Royal assent/Commencement: 28 March 1961; Repeal date: 31 July 1964 (by the Statute Law Revision Act 1964)
- The Consolidated Fund Act 1962 (10 & 11 Eliz. 2. c. 7)
  - An Act to apply a sum out of the Consolidated Fund to the service of the year ending on the thirty-first day of March, one thousand nine hundred and sixty-two.
  - Royal assent/Commencement: 21 February 1962; Repeal date: 31 July 1964 (by the Statute Law Revision Act 1964)
- The Consolidated Fund (No. 2) Act 1962 (10 & 11 Eliz. 2. c. 11)
  - An Act to apply certain sums out of the Consolidated Fund to the service of the years ending on the thirty-first day of March, one thousand nine hundred and sixty-one, one thousand nine hundred and sixty-two and one thousand nine hundred and sixty-three.
  - Royal assent/Commencement: 29 March 1962; Repeal date: 31 July 1964 (by the Statute Law Revision Act 1964)
- The Consolidated Fund Act 1963 (1963 c. 1)
  - An Act to apply a sum out of the Consolidated Fund to the service of the year ending on 31st March 1963.
  - Royal assent/Commencement: 28 February 1963; Repeal date: 27 July 1971 (by the Statute Law (Repeals) Act 1971)

- The Consolidated Fund (No. 2) Act 1963 (1963 c. 8)
  - An Act to apply certain sums out of the Consolidated Fund to the service of the years ending on 31st March 1962, 1963 and 1964.
  - Royal assent/Commencement: 28 March 1963; Repeal date: 27 July 1971 (by the Statute Law (Repeals) Act 1971)

- The Consolidated Fund Act 1964 (1964 c. 1)
  - An Act to apply a sum out of the Consolidated Fund to the service of the year ending on 31st March 1964.
  - Royal assent/Commencement: 6 February 1964; Repeal date: 27 July 1971 (by the Statute Law (Repeals) Act 1971)

- The Consolidated Fund (No. 2) Act 1964 (1964 c. 17)
  - An Act to apply certain sums out of the Consolidated Fund to the service of the years ending on 31st March 1963, 1964 and 1965.
  - Royal assent/Commencement: 25 March 1964; Repeal date: 27 July 1971 (by the Statute Law (Repeals) Act 1971)

- The Consolidated Fund Act 1965 (1965 c. 1)
  - An Act to apply a sum out of the Consolidated Fund to the service of the year ending on 31st March 1965.
  - Royal assent/Commencement: 4 February 1965; Repeal date: 27 July 1971 (by the Statute Law (Repeals) Act 1971)

- The Consolidated Fund (No. 2) Act 1965 (1965 c. 8)
  - An Act to apply certain sums out of the Consolidated Fund to the service of the years ending on 31st March 1964, 1965 and 1966.
  - Royal assent/Commencement: 29 March 1965; Repeal date: 27 July 1971 (by the Statute Law (Repeals) Act 1971)

- The Consolidated Fund Act 1966 (1966 c. 1)
  - An Act to apply a sum out of the Consolidated Fund to the service of the year ending on 31st March 1966.
  - Royal assent/Commencement: 24 February 1966; Repeal date: 27 July 1971 (by the Statute Law (Repeals) Act 1971)

- The Consolidated Fund Act 1967 (1967 c. 2)
  - An Act to apply a sum out of the Consolidated Fund to the service of the year ending on 31st March 1967.
  - Royal assent/Commencement: 16 February 1967; Repeal date: 27 July 1971 (by the Statute Law (Repeals) Act 1971)

- The Consolidated Fund (No. 2) Act 1967 (1967 c. 6)
  - An Act to apply certain sums out of the Consolidated Fund to the service of the years ending on 31st March 1966, 1967 and 1968.
  - Royal assent/Commencement: 22 March 1967; Repeal date: 27 July 1971 (by the Statute Law (Repeals) Act 1971)

- The Consolidated Fund Act 1968 (1968 c. 1)
  - An Act to apply a sum out of the Consolidated Fund to the service of the year ending on 31st March 1968.
  - Royal assent/Commencement: 1 February 1968; Repeal date: 27 July 1971 (by the Statute Law (Repeals) Act 1971)

- The Consolidated Fund (No. 2) Act 1968 (1968 c. 15)
  - An Act to apply certain sums out of the Consolidated Fund to the service of the years ending on 31st March 1967, 1968 and 1969.
  - Royal assent/Commencement: 28 March 1968; Repeal date: 27 July 1971 (by the Statute Law (Repeals) Act 1971)

- The Consolidated Fund Act 1969 (1969 c. 3)
  - An Act to apply a sum out of the Consolidated Fund to the service of the year ending on 31st March 1969.
  - Royal assent/Commencement: 12 February 1969; Repeal date: 27 July 1971 (by the Statute Law (Repeals) Act 1971)

- The Consolidated Fund (No. 2) Act 1969 (1969 c. 9)
  - An Act to apply certain sums out of the Consolidated Fund to the service of the years ending on 31st March 1968, 1969 and 1970.
  - Royal assent/Commencement: 27 March 1969; Repeal date: 27 July 1971 (by the Statute Law (Repeals) Act 1971)

==== 1970s ====
- The Consolidated Fund Act 1970 (1970 c. 1)
  - An Act to apply certain sums out of the Consolidated Fund to the service of the years ending on 31st March 1970 and 1971.
  - Royal assent/Commencement: 29 January 1970; Repeal date: 31 July 1974 (by the Appropriation (No. 2) Act 1974)

- The Consolidated Fund (No. 2) Act 1970 (1970 c. 12)
  - An Act to apply certain sums out of the Consolidated Fund to the service of the years ending on 31st March 1969, 1970 and 1971.
  - Royal assent/Commencement: 24 March 1970; Repeal date: 31 July 1974 (by the Appropriation (No. 2) Act 1974)

- The Consolidated Fund Act 1971 (1971 c. 1)
  - An Act to apply certain sums out of the Consolidated Fund to the service of the years ending on 31st March 1971 and 1972.
  - Royal assent/Commencement: 17 February 1971; Repeal date: 31 July 1974 (by the Appropriation (No. 2) Act 1974)

- The Consolidated Fund (No. 2) Act 1971 (1971 c. 14)
  - An Act to apply certain sums out of the Consolidated Fund to the service of the years ending on 31st March 1970, 1971 and 1972.
  - Royal assent/Commencement: 30 March 1971; Repeal date: 31 July 1974 (by the Appropriation (No. 2) Act 1974)

- The Consolidated Fund (No. 3) Act 1971 (1971 c. 79)
  - An Act to apply certain sums out of the Consolidated Fund to the service of the years ending on 31st March 1972 and 1973.
  - Royal assent/Commencement: 16 December 1971; Repeal date: 31 July 1974 (by the Appropriation (No. 2) Act 1974)

- The Consolidated Fund Act 1972 (1972 c. 13)
  - An Act to apply certain sums out of the Consolidated Fund to the service of the years ending on 31st March 1971, 1972 and 1973.
  - Royal assent/Commencement: 23 March 1972; Repeal date: 31 July 1974 (by the Appropriation (No. 2) Act 1974)

- The Consolidated Fund (No. 2) Act 1972 (1972 c. 23)
  - An Act to apply a sum out of the Consolidated Fund to the service of the year ending on 31st March 1973.
  - Royal assent/Commencement: 11 May 1972; Repeal date: 31 July 1974 (by the Appropriation (No. 2) Act 1974)

- The Consolidated Fund (No. 3) Act 1972 (1972 c. 78)
  - An Act to apply certain sums out of the Consolidated Fund to the service of the years ending on 31st March 1973 and 1974.
  - Royal assent/Commencement: 12 December 1972; Repeal date: 1 August 1975 (by the Appropriation Act 1975)

- The Consolidated Fund Act 1973 (1973 c. 1)
  - An Act to apply a sum out of the Consolidated Fund to the service of the year ending on 31st March 1973.
  - Royal assent/Commencement: 13 February 1973; Repeal date: 1 August 1975 (by the Appropriation Act 1975)

- The Consolidated Fund (No. 2) Act 1973 (1973 c. 10)
  - An Act to apply certain sums out of the Consolidated Fund to the service of the years ending on 31st March 1972, 1973 and 1974.
  - Royal assent/Commencement: 29 March 1973; Repeal date: 1 August 1975 (by the Appropriation Act 1975)

- The Consolidated Fund Act 1974 (1974 c. 1)
  - An Act to apply certain sums out of the Consolidated Fund to the service of the years ending on 31st March 1974 and 1975.
  - Royal assent/Commencement: 22 January 1974; Repeal date: 6 August 1976 (by the Appropriation Act 1976)

- The Consolidated Fund (No. 2) Act 1974 (1974 c. 12)
  - An Act to apply a sum out of the Consolidated Fund to the service of the year ending on 31st March 1974.
  - Royal assent/Commencement: 21 March 1974; Repeal date: 6 August 1976 (by the Appropriation Act 1976)

- The Consolidated Fund (No. 3) Act 1974 (1974 c. 15)
  - An Act to apply a sum out of the Consolidated Fund to the service of the year ending on 31st March 1975.
  - Royal assent/Commencement: 23 May 1974; Repeal date: 6 August 1976 (by the Appropriation Act 1976)

- The Consolidated Fund (No. 4) Act 1974 (1974 c. 57)
  - An Act to apply a sum out of the Consolidated Fund to the service of the year ending on 31st March 1975.
  - Royal assent/Commencement: 12 December 1974; Repeal date: 6 August 1976 (by the Appropriation Act 1976)

- The Consolidated Fund Act 1975 (1975 c. 1)
  - An Act to apply certain sums out of the Consolidated Fund to the service of the years ending on 31st March 1975 and 1976.
  - Royal assent/Commencement: 30 January 1975; Repeal date: 29 July 1977 (by the Appropriation Act 1977)

- The Consolidated Fund (No. 2) Act 1975 (1975 c. 12)
  - An Act to apply certain sums out of the Consolidated Fund to the service of the years ending on 31st March 1974 and 1975.
  - Royal assent/Commencement: 20 March 1975; Repeal date: 29 July 1977 (by the Appropriation Act 1977)

- The Consolidated Fund (No. 3) Act 1975 (1975 c. 79)
  - An Act to apply certain sums out of the Consolidated Fund to the service of the years ending on 31st March 1976 and 1977.
  - Royal assent/Commencement: 19 December 1975; Repeal date: 29 July 1977 (by the Appropriation Act 1977)

- The Consolidated Fund Act 1976 (1976 c. 2)
  - An Act to apply certain sums out of the Consolidated Fund to the service of the years ending on 31st March 1975 and 1976.
  - Royal assent/Commencement: 25 March 1976; Repeal date: 2 August 1978 (by the Appropriation Act 1978)

- The Consolidated Fund (No. 2) Act 1976 (1976 c. 84)
  - An Act to apply certain sums out of the Consolidated Fund to the service of the years ending on 31st March 1977 and 1978.
  - Royal assent/Commencement: 22 December 1976; Repeal date: 2 August 1978 (by the Appropriation Act 1978)

- The Consolidated Fund Act 1977 (1977 c. 1)
  - An Act to apply certain sums out of the Consolidated Fund to the service of the years ending on 31st March 1976 and 1977.
  - Royal assent/Commencement: 17 March 1977; Repeal date: 27 July 1979 (by the Appropriation (No. 2) Act 1979)

- The Consolidated Fund (No. 2) Act 1977 (1977 c. 52)
  - An Act to apply certain sums out of the Consolidated Fund to the service of the years ending on 31st March 1978 and 1979.
  - Royal assent/Commencement: 15 December 1977; Repeal date: 27 July 1979 (by the Appropriation (No. 2) Act 1979)

- The Consolidated Fund Act 1978 (1978 c. 7)
  - An Act to apply certain sums out of the Consolidated Fund to the service of the years ending on 31st March 1977 and 1978.
  - Royal assent/Commencement: 23 March 1978; Repeal date: 8 August 1980 (by the Appropriation Act 1980)

- The Consolidated Fund (No. 2) Act 1978 (1978 c. 59)
  - An Act to apply certain sums out of the Consolidated Fund to the service of the years ending on 31st March 1979 and 1980.
  - Royal assent/Commencement: 14 December 1978; Repeal date: 8 August 1980 (by the Appropriation Act 1980)

- The Consolidated Fund Act 1979 (Note: Section 4(b) of the Interpretation Act 1978.) (1979 c. 20)
  - An Act to apply certain sums out of the Consolidated Fund to the service of the years ending on 31st March 1978 and 1979.
  - Royal assent/Commencement: 22 March 1979; Repeal date: 28 July 1981 (by the Appropriation Act 1981)

- The Consolidated Fund (No. 2) Act 1979 (1979 c. 56)
  - An Act to apply certain sums out of the Consolidated Fund to the service of the years ending on 31st March 1980 and 1981.
  - Royal assent/Commencement: 20 December 1979; Repeal date: 28 July 1981 (by the Appropriation Act 1981)

==== 1980s ====
- The Consolidated Fund Act 1980 (1980 c. 14)
  - An Act to apply certain sums out of the Consolidated Fund to the service of the years ending on 31st March 1979 and 1980.
  - Royal assent/Commencement: 20 March 1980; Repeal date: 30 July 1982 (by the Appropriation Act 1982)

- The Consolidated Fund (No. 2) Act 1980 (1980 c. 68)
  - An Act to apply certain sums out of the Consolidated Fund to the service of the years ending on 31st March 1981 and 1982.
  - Royal assent/Commencement: 18 December 1980; Repeal date: 30 July 1982 (by the Appropriation Act 1982)

- The Consolidated Fund Act 1981 (1981 c. 4)
  - An Act to apply certain sums out of the Consolidated Fund to the service of the years ending on 31st March 1980 and 1981.
  - Royal assent: 19 March 1981; Commencement: 19 March 1981

- The Consolidated Fund (No. 2) Act 1981 (1981 c. 70)
  - An Act to apply certain sums out of the Consolidated Fund to the service of the years ending on 31st March 1982 and 1983.
  - Royal assent: 22 December 1981; Commencement: 22 December 1981

- The Consolidated Fund Act 1982 (1982 c. 8)
  - An Act to apply certain sums out of the Consolidated Fund to the service of the years ending on 31st March 1981 and 1982.
  - Royal assent/Commencement: 22 March 1982; Repeal date: 26 July 1984 (by the Appropriation Act 1984)

- The Consolidated Fund Act 1983 (1983 c. 1)
  - An Act to apply certain sums out of the Consolidated Fund to the service of the years ending on 31st March 1983 and 1984.
  - Royal assent/Commencement: 8 February 1983; Repeal date: 26 July 1984 (by the Appropriation Act 1984)

- The Consolidated Fund (No. 2) Act 1983 (1983 c. 5)
  - An Act to apply certain sums out of the Consolidated Fund to the service of the years ending on 31st March 1982 and 1983.
  - Royal assent/Commencement: 28 March 1983; Repeal date: 25 July 1985 (by the Appropriation Act 1985)

- The Consolidated Fund (No. 3) Act 1983 (1983 c. 57)
  - An Act to apply certain sums out of the Consolidated Fund to the service of the years ending on 31st March 1984 and 1985.
  - Royal assent/Commencement: 21 December 1983; Repeal date: 25 July 1985 (by the Appropriation Act 1985)

- The Consolidated Fund Act 1984 (1984 c. 1)
  - An Act to apply certain sums out of the Consolidated Fund to the service of the years ending on 31st March 1983 and 1984.
  - Royal assent/Commencement: 13 March 1984; Repeal date: 25 July 1986 (by the Appropriation Act 1986)

- The Consolidated Fund (No. 2) Act 1984 (1984 c. 61)
  - An Act to apply certain sums out of the Consolidated Fund to the service of the years ending on 31st March 1985 and 1986.
  - Royal assent/Commencement: 20 December 1984; Repeal date: 25 July 1986 (by the Appropriation Act 1986)

- The Consolidated Fund Act 1985 (1985 c. 1)
  - An Act to apply a sum out of the Consolidated Fund to the service of the year ending on 31st March 1985.
  - Royal assent/Commencement: 24 January 1985; Repeal date: 15 May 1987 (by the Appropriation Act 1987)

- The Consolidated Fund (No. 2) Act 1985 (1985 c. 11)
  - An Act to apply certain sums out of the Consolidated Fund to the service of the years ending on 31st March 1984 and 1985.
  - Royal assent/Commencement: 27 March 1985; Repeal date: 15 May 1987 (by the Appropriation Act 1987)

- The Consolidated Fund (No. 3) Act 1985 (1985 c. 74)
  - An Act to apply certain sums out of the Consolidated Fund to the service of the years ending on 31st March 1986 and 1987.
  - Royal assent/Commencement: 19 December 1985; Repeal date: 15 May 1987 (by the Appropriation Act 1987)

- The Consolidated Fund Act 1986 (1986 c. 4)
  - An Act to apply certain sums out of the Consolidated Fund to the service of the years ending on 31st March 1985 and 1986.
  - Royal assent/Commencement: 18 March 1986; Repeal date: 29 July 1988 (by the Appropriation Act 1988)

- The Consolidated Fund (No. 2) Act 1986 (1986 c. 67)
  - An Act to apply certain sums out of the Consolidated Fund to the service of the years ending on 31st March 1987 and 1988.
  - Royal assent/Commencement: 18 December 1986; Repeal date: 29 July 1988 (by the Appropriation Act 1988)

- The Consolidated Fund Act 1987 (1987 c. 8)
  - An Act to apply certain sums out of the Consolidated Fund to the service of the years ending on 31st March 1986 and 1987.
  - Royal assent/Commencement: 25 March 1987; Repeal date: 27 July 1989 (by the Appropriation Act 1989)

- The Consolidated Fund (No. 2) Act 1987 (1987 c. 54)
  - An Act to apply a sum out of the Consolidated Fund to the service of the year ending on 31st March 1988.
  - Royal assent/Commencement: 17 November 1987; Repeal date: 27 July 1989 (by the Appropriation Act 1989)

- The Consolidated Fund (No. 3) Act 1987 (1987 c. 55)
  - An Act to apply certain sums out of the Consolidated Fund to the service of the years ending on 31st March 1988 and 1989.
  - Royal assent/Commencement: 10 December 1987; Repeal date: 27 July 1989 (by the Appropriation Act 1989)

- The Consolidated Fund Act 1988 (1988 c. 6)
  - An Act to apply certain sums out of the Consolidated Fund to the service of the years ending on 31st March 1987 and 1988.
  - Royal assent/Commencement: 15 March 1988; Repeal date: 26 July 1990 (by the Appropriation Act 1990)

- The Consolidated Fund (No. 2) Act 1988 (1988 c. 55)
  - An Act to apply certain sums out of the Consolidated Fund to the service of the years ending on 31st March 1989 and 1990.
  - Royal assent/Commencement: 20 December 1988; Repeal date: 25 July 1991 (by the Appropriation Act 1991)

- The Consolidated Fund Act 1989 (1989 c. 2)
  - An Act to apply certain sums out of the Consolidated Fund to the service of the years ending on 31st March 1988 and 1989.
  - Royal assent/Commencement: 15 March 1989; Repeal date: 25 July 1991 (by the Appropriation Act 1991)

- The Consolidated Fund (No. 2) Act 1989 (1989 c. 46)
  - An Act to apply certain sums out of the Consolidated Fund to the service of the years ending on 31st March 1990 and 1991.
  - Royal assent/Commencement: 21 December 1989; Repeal date: 16 March 1992 (by the Appropriation Act 1992)

==== 1990s ====
- The Consolidated Fund Act 1990 (1990 c. 4)
  - An Act to apply certain sums out of the Consolidated Fund to the service of the years ending on 31st March 1989, 1990 and 1991.
  - Royal assent/Commencement: 28 March 1990; Repeal date: 16 March 1992 (by the Appropriation Act 1992)

- The Consolidated Fund (No. 2) Act 1990 (1990 c. 46)
  - An Act to apply certain sums out of the Consolidated Fund to the service of the years ending on 31st March 1991 and 1992.
  - Royal assent/Commencement: 20 December 1990; Repeal date: 27 July 1993 (by the Appropriation Act 1993)

- The Consolidated Fund Act 1991 (1991 c. 7)
  - An Act to apply certain sums out of the Consolidated Fund to the service of the years ending on 31st March 1990, 1991 and 1992.
  - Royal assent/Commencement: 21 March 1991; Repeal date: 27 July 1993 (by the Appropriation Act 1993)

- The Consolidated Fund (No. 2) Act 1991 (1991 c. 10)
  - An Act to apply certain sums out of the Consolidated Fund to the service of the year ending on 31st March 1992.
  - Royal assent/Commencement: 9 May 1991; Repeal date: 27 July 1993 (by the Appropriation Act 1993)

- The Consolidated Fund (No. 3) Act 1991 (1991 c. 68)
  - An Act to apply certain sums out of the Consolidated Fund to the service of the years ending on 31st March 1992 and 1993.
  - Royal assent/Commencement: 19 December 1991; Repeal date: 21 July 1994 (by the Appropriation Act 1994)

- The Consolidated Fund Act 1992 (1992 c. 1)
  - An Act to apply certain sums out of the Consolidated Fund to the service of the years ending on 31st March 1992 and 1993.
  - Royal assent/Commencement: 13 February 1992; Repeal date: 21 July 1994 (by the Appropriation Act 1994)

- The Consolidated Fund (No. 2) Act 1992 (1992 c. 21)
  - An Act to apply certain sums out of the Consolidated Fund to the service of the years ending on 31st March 1991 and 1992.
  - Royal assent/Commencement: 16 March 1992; Repeal date: 21 July 1994 (by the Appropriation Act 1994)
- The Consolidated Fund (No. 3) Act 1992 (1992 c. 59)
  - An Act to apply certain sums out of the Consolidated Fund to the service of the years ending on 31st March 1993 and 1994.
  - Royal assent/Commencement: 17 December 1992; Repeal date: 19 July 1995 (by the Appropriation Act 1995)

- The Consolidated Fund Act 1993 (1993 c. 4)
  - An Act to apply certain sums out of the Consolidated Fund to the service of the year ending on 31st March 1993.
  - Royal assent/Commencement: 18 February 1993; Repeal date: 19 July 1995 (by the Appropriation Act 1995)

- The Consolidated Fund (No. 2) Act 1993 (1993 c. 7)
  - An Act to apply certain sums out of the Consolidated Fund to the service of the years ending on 31st March 1992 and 1993.
  - Royal assent/Commencement: 29 March 1993; Repeal date: 19 July 1995 (by the Appropriation Act 1995)

- The Consolidated Fund (No. 3) Act 1993 (1993 c. 52)
  - An Act to apply certain sums out of the Consolidated Fund to the service of the years ending on 31st March 1994 and 1995.
  - Royal assent/Commencement: 17 December 1993; Repeal date: 19 July 1995 (by the Appropriation Act 1995)

- The Consolidated Fund Act 1994 (1994 c. 4)
  - An Act to apply certain sums out of the Consolidated Fund to the service of the years ending on 31st March 1993 and 1994.
  - Royal assent/Commencement: 24 March 1994; Repeal date: 24 July 1996 (by the Appropriation Act 1996)

- The Consolidated Fund (No. 2) Act 1994 (1994 c. 41)
  - An Act to apply certain sums out of the Consolidated Fund to the service of the years ending on 31st March 1995 and 1996.
  - Royal assent/Commencement: 16 December 1994; Repeal date: 24 July 1996 (by the Appropriation Act 1996)

- The Consolidated Fund Act 1995 (1995 c. 2)
  - An Act to apply certain sums out of the Consolidated Fund to the service of the years ending on 31st March 1994 and 1995.
  - Royal assent/Commencement: 23 March 1995; Repeal date: 21 March 1997 (by the Appropriation Act 1997)

- The Consolidated Fund (No. 2) Act 1995 (1995 c. 54)
  - An Act to apply certain sums out of the Consolidated Fund to the service of the years ending on 31st March 1996 and 1997.
  - Royal assent/Commencement: 19 December 1995; Repeal date: 21 March 1997 (by the Appropriation Act 1997)

- The Consolidated Fund Act 1996 (1996 c. 4)
  - An Act to apply certain sums out of the Consolidated Fund to the service of the years ending on 31st March 1995 and 1996.
  - Royal assent/Commencement: 21 March 1996; Repeal date: 16 July 1998 (by the Appropriation Act 1998)

- The Consolidated Fund (No. 2) Act 1996 (1996 c. 60)
  - An Act to apply certain sums out of the Consolidated Fund to the service of the years ending on 31st March 1997 and 1998.
  - Royal assent/Commencement: 18 December 1996; Repeal date: 16 July 1998 (by the Appropriation Act 1998)

- The Consolidated Fund Act 1997 (1997 c. 15)
  - An Act to apply certain sums out of the Consolidated Fund to the service of the years ending on 31st March 1996 and 1997.
  - Royal assent/Commencement: 19 March 1997; Repeal date: 15 July 1999 (by the Appropriation Act 1999)

- The Consolidated Fund (No. 2) Act 1997 (1997 c. 67)
  - An Act to apply certain sums out of the Consolidated Fund to the service of the years ending on 31st March 1998 and 1999.
  - Royal assent/Commencement: 17 December 1997; Repeal date: 15 July 1999 (by the Appropriation Act 1999)

- The Consolidated Fund Act 1998 (1998 c. 4)
  - An Act to apply certain sums out of the Consolidated Fund to the service of the years ending on 31st March 1997 and 1998.
  - Royal assent/Commencement: 18 March 1998; Repeal date: 20 July 2000 (by the Consolidated Fund (Appropriation) Act 2000)

- The Consolidated Fund (No. 2) Act 1998 (1998 c. 49)
  - An Act to apply certain sums out of the Consolidated Fund to the service of the years ending on 31st March 1999 and 2000.
  - Royal assent/Commencement: 17 December 1998; Repeal date: 20 July 2000 (by the Consolidated Fund (Appropriation) Act 2000)

- The Consolidated Fund Act 1999 (1999 c. 4)
  - An Act to apply certain sums out of the Consolidated Fund to the service of the years ending on 31st March 1998 and 1999.
  - Royal assent/Commencement: 25 March 1999; Repeal date: 11 May 2001 (by the Appropriation Act 2001)

- The Consolidated Fund (No. 2) Act 1999 (1999 c. 35)
  - An Act to apply certain sums out of the Consolidated Fund to the service of the years ending on 31st March 2000 and 2001.
  - Royal assent/Commencement: 16 December 1999; Repeal date: 11 May 2001 (by the Appropriation Act 2001)

==== 2000s ====
- The Consolidated Fund Act 2000 (2000 c. 3)
  - An Act to apply certain sums out of the Consolidated Fund to the service of the years ending on 31st March 1999, 2000 and 2001.
  - Royal assent/Commencement: 21 March 2000; Repeal date: 8 July 2002 (by the Appropriation Act 2002)

- The Consolidated Fund (No. 2) Act 2000 (2000 c. 45)
  - An Act to apply certain sums out of the Consolidated Fund to the service of the year ending on 31st March 2001.
  - Royal assent/Commencement: 21 December 2000; Repeal date: 8 July 2002 (by the Appropriation Act 2002)

- The Consolidated Fund Act 2001 (2001 c. 1)
  - An Act to authorise the use of resources for the service of the year ending on 31st March 2002 and to apply certain sums out of the Consolidated Fund to the service of the years ending on 31st March 2000, 2001 and 2002.
  - Royal assent/Commencement: 22 March 2001; Repeal date: 10 July 2003 (by the Appropriation Act 2003)

- The Consolidated Fund (No. 2) Act 2001 (2001 c. 25)
  - An Act to authorise the use of resources for the service of the years ending on 31st March 2002 and 2003 and to apply certain sums out of the Consolidated Fund to the service of the years ending on 31st March 2002 and 2003.
  - Royal assent/Commencement: 18 December 2001; Repeal date: 10 July 2003 (by the Appropriation Act 2003)

- The Consolidated Fund Act 2002 (2002 c. 10)
  - An Act to authorise the use of resources for the service of the year ending on 31st March 2002 and to apply certain sums out of the Consolidated Fund to the service of the years ending on 31st March 2001 and 2002.
  - Royal assent/Commencement: 19 March 2002; Repeal date: 8 July 2004 (by the Appropriation Act 2004)

- The Consolidated Fund (No. 2) Act 2002 (2002 c. 43)
  - An Act to authorise the use of resources for the service of the years ending on 31st March 2003 and 2004 and to apply certain sums out of the Consolidated Fund to the service of the years ending on 31st March 2003 and 2004.
  - Royal assent/Commencement: 17 December 2002; Repeal date: 8 July 2004 (by the Appropriation Act 2004)

- The Consolidated Fund Act 2003 (2003 c. 2)
  - An Act to authorise the use of resources for the service of the years ending on 31st March 2002 and 2003 and to apply certain sums out of the Consolidated Fund to the service of the years ending on 31st March 2002 and 2003.
  - Royal assent/Commencement: 20 March 2003; Repeal date: 20 July 2005 (by the Appropriation (No. 3) Act 2005)

- The Consolidated Fund (No. 2) Act 2003 (2003 c. 45)
  - An Act to authorise the use of resources for the service of the years ending with 31st March 2004 and 2005 and to apply certain sums out of the Consolidated Fund to the service of the years ending with 31st March 2004 and 2005.
  - Royal assent/Commencement: 17 December 2003; Repeal date: 20 July 2005 (by the Appropriation (No. 3) Act 2005)

- The Consolidated Fund Act 2004 (2004 c. 1)
  - An Act to authorise the use of resources for the service of the years ending with 31st March 2003 and 2004 and to apply certain sums out of the Consolidated Fund to the service of the years ending with 31st March 2003 and 2004.
  - Royal assent/Commencement: 22 March 2004; Repeal date: 19 July 2006 (by the Appropriation (No. 2) Act 2006)

- The Consolidated Fund (No. 2) Act 2004 (2004 c. 38)
  - An Act to authorise the use of resources for the service of the years ending with 31st March 2005 and 31st March 2006 and to apply certain sums out of the Consolidated Fund to the service of the years ending with 31st March 2005 and 31st March 2006.
  - Royal assent/Commencement: 16 December 2004; Repeal date: 19 July 2006 (by the Appropriation (No. 2) Act 2006)

- The Consolidated Fund Act 2005 (2005 c. 23)
  - An Act to authorise the use of resources for the service of the years ending with 31st March 2006 and 31st March 2007 and to apply certain sums out of the Consolidated Fund to the service of the years ending with 31st March 2006 and 31st March 2007.
  - Royal assent/Commencement: 19 December 2005; Repeal date: 19 July 2007 (by the Appropriation (No. 2) Act 2007)

- The Consolidated Fund Act 2006 (2006 c. 54)
  - An Act to authorise the use of resources for the service of the years ending with 31st March 2007 and 31st March 2008 and to apply certain sums out of the Consolidated Fund to the service of the years ending with 31st March 2007 and 31st March 2008.
  - Royal assent/Commencement: 19 December 2006; Repeal date: 21 July 2008 (by the Appropriation (No. 2) Act 2008)

- The Consolidated Fund Act 2007 (2007 c. 31)
  - An Act to authorise the use of resources for the service of the years ending with 31st March 2008 and 31st March 2009 and to apply certain sums out of the Consolidated Fund to the service of the years ending with 31st March 2008 and 31st March 2009.
  - Royal assent/Commencement: 13 December 2007; Repeal date: 21 July 2009 (by the Appropriation (No. 2) Act 2009)

- The Consolidated Fund Act 2008 (2008 c. 33)
  - An Act to authorise the use of resources for the service of the years ending with 31 March 2009 and 31 March 2010 and to apply certain sums out of the Consolidated Fund to the service of the years ending with 31 March 2009 and 31 March 2010.
  - Royal assent/Commencement: 18 December 2008; Repeal date: 27 July 2010 (by the Appropriation (No. 3) Act 2010)

- The Consolidated Fund Act 2009 (2009 c. 27)
  - An Act to authorise the use of resources for the service of the years ending with 31 March 2010 and 31 March 2011 and to apply certain sums out of the Consolidated Fund to the service of the years ending with 31 March 2010 and 31 March 2011.
  - Royal assent: 16 December 2009; Commencement: 16 December 2009
- The Consolidated Fund Act 2010 (2010 c. 39)
  - An Act to authorise the use of resources for the service of the year ending with 31 March 2011 and to apply certain sums out of the Consolidated Fund to the service of the year ending with 31 March 2011; and to authorise the use of resources for the year ending with 31 March 2012 and the issue of sums out of the Consolidated Fund for the year ending with 31 March 2012.
  - Royal assent: 21 December 2010; Commencement: 21 December 2010

No Consolidated Fund Acts have been passed since 2010.
