= Bishoprics, etc., in West Indies Act 1842 =

Act of the Parliament of the United Kingdom

- Act of Parliament
- Parliament of the United Kingdom
- Long title: An Act to provide for the Increase of the Number of Bishoprics and Archdeaconries in the West Indies, and to amend the several Acts relating thereto.
- Citation: 5 & 6 Vict. c. 4
- Territorial extent: United Kingdom

Dates
- Royal assent: 23 March 1842
- Commencement: 23 March 1842 (Note: The Acts of Parliament (Commencement) Act 1793.)
- Repealed: 27 July 1971
Other legislation
Amended by	Statute Law Revision Act 1874 (No. 2)
Repealed by	Statute Law (Repeals) Act 1971

Status: Repealed

Text of statute as originally enacted

The Bishoprics, etc., in West Indies Act 1842 (5 & 6 Vict. c. 4) was an act of the Parliament of the United Kingdom, which received royal assent on 23 March 1842 and was repealed in 1971.

It provided for the West Indies to be divided up into three or more bishoprics, rather than the two previously provided for. This allowed the establishment of the Diocese of Antigua in 1842, in addition to the two dioceses created in 1824, the Diocese of Jamaica and the Diocese of Barbados. The act also empowered the bishops to appoint archdeacons, and for the Treasury to pay £6,300 to support the establishment.

== Subsequent developments ==
The whole act was repealed by section 1 of, and the part II of the schedule to, the Statute Law (Repeals) Act 1971, which came into force on 27 July 1971.
