= Queen Anne's Bounty Act 1838 =

Act of the Parliament of the United Kingdom

Queen Anne's Bounty Act 1838 (Note: The citation of this act by this short title was authorised by section 1 of, and the first schedule to, the Short Titles Act 1896. Due to the repeal of those provisions it is now authorised by section 19(2) of the Interpretation Act 1978.)
- Act of Parliament
- Parliament of the United Kingdom
- Long title: An Act for the Consolidation of the Offices of First Fruits, Tenths, and Queen Anne's Bounty.
- Citation: 1 & 2 Vict. c. 20
- Territorial extent: England and Wales (Note: Section 8.)

Dates
- Royal assent: 11 April 1838
- Commencement: 11 April 1838 (general) (Note: The Acts of Parliament (Commencement) Act 1793.); 24 December 1838 (abolition of the offices of First Fruits and Tenths) (Note: Section 1.)
- Repealed: 22 July 2004
Other legislation
Amended by	Statute Law Revision (No. 2) Act 1890; Statute Law Revision Act 1964; Statute Law (Repeals) Act 1971
Repealed by	Statute Law (Repeals) Act 2004

Status: Repealed

Text of statute as originally enacted

Revised text of statute as amended

The Queen Anne's Bounty Act 1838 (1 & 2 Vict. c. 20) was an act of the Parliament of the United Kingdom that abolished the separate offices of First Fruits and Tenths and transferred their functions and revenues to the Treasurer of Queen Anne's Bounty, consolidating the collection of first fruits and tenths under a single administration for the augmentation of the maintenance of the poor clergy of the Church of England in England and Wales.

== Provisions ==
=== Abolition of the offices of First Fruits and Tenths ===
With effect from 24 December 1838, section 1 of the act abolished the office of Remembrancer of First Fruits and Tenths, the offices of Collectors or Receivers of First Fruits and Tenths, and the clerkships attached to them. Section 3 made the Treasurer of Queen Anne's Bounty the sole collector of first fruits and yearly tenths in their place, and section 5 of the act transferred to the treasurer the duties previously performed by the abolished offices. Section 10 of the act preserved the effect of earlier enactments relating to first fruits and tenths, except so far as they were altered by the act.

=== Compensation ===
Sections 11 to 15 of the act provided for compensation to be paid, out of the funds of the Governors of the Bounty of Queen Anne, to Henry Warre, the Remembrancer of First Fruits and Tenths, and to the collectors and clerks whose offices were abolished, the amount in each case to be settled by the Lord High Treasurer or the Commissioners of the Treasury. The average annual emoluments of the officers concerned, and the expenses of the two offices, amounting in total to £2,022 18s. 11d. a year, were set out in the schedule to the act.

=== Governance and administration ===
Section 16 of the act made the Bishop of Ripon, and the bishop of any future new see founded in England or Wales, a governor of the Bounty of Queen Anne. Section 17 required the governors to hold an annual general meeting, and section 18 required them to lay an annual account of their receipts and disbursements before the Sovereign in Council and both Houses of Parliament. Section 19 empowered the Crown, on the recommendation of the governors, to make rules and orders for collecting the revenues and regulating the duties of the treasurer and his clerks. Sections 20 to 23 authorised short forms of deed for purchases and grants of stipends made by the governors for the augmentation of small livings, and empowered the governors to have such deeds enrolled in the Court of Chancery.

== Subsequent developments ==
Section 21 of the act was repealed by section 1 of, and the part II of the schedule to, the Statute Law (Repeals) Act 1971, which came into force on 27 July 1971.

The whole act was repealed by section 1(1) of, and part 6 of schedule 1 to, the Statute Law (Repeals) Act 2004, which came into force on 22 July 2004.
