= Statute Law (Repeals) Act 1971 =

Act of the Parliament of the United Kingdom

Statute Law (Repeals) Act 1971 (Note: Section 3.)
- Act of Parliament
- Parliament of the United Kingdom
- Long title: An Act to promote the reform of the statute law by the repeal, in accordance with recommendations of the Law Commission and the Scottish Law Commission, of certain enactments which are no longer of practical utility.
- Citation: 1971 c. 52
- Territorial extent: United Kingdom (Note: Section 2.)

Dates
- Royal assent: 27 July 1971
- Commencement: 27 July 1971 (Note: The Acts of Parliament (Commencement) Act 1793)
- Repealed: 19 November 1998
Other legislation
Amends	See § Repealed enactments
Repeals/revokes	See § Repealed enactments
Repealed by	Statute Law (Repeals) Act 1998
Relates to	See Statute Law (Reals) Act

Status: Repealed

Text of statute as originally enacted

The Statute Law (Repeals) Act 1971 (c. 52) was an act of the Parliament of the United Kingdom.

== Background ==
The act implemented recommendations contained in the third report on statute law revision, by the Law Commission.

== Provisions ==
=== Repealed enactments ===
Section 1 of the act repealed 172 enactments, listed in parts I to IX of the schedule to the act.

==== Part I: Enactments relating to Irish peers ====
Part I — Enactments relating to Irish peers
Citation	Short title	Extent of repeal
39 & 40 Geo. 3. c. 67	Union with Ireland Act 1800	In Article IV of the Treaty of Union as set out in section 1, the first paragraph; the third paragraph; in the fourth paragraph, the words from " unless he " to " United Kingdom " and the words from " nor be " onwards; in the ninth paragraph (that is, the paragraph beginning with the words " That when his Majesty "), the words " lords temporal and ", in both places where they occur; and in the last paragraph, the words from the beginning to the words " Great Britain; and " where those words first occur. Section 2 from the words " Whereas it is agreed " to " the place so vacant " and from the words " For the due election of the persons to be chosen " to " shall be deemed the peer elected " where those words secondly occur.
20 & 21 Vict. c. 33	Representative Peers (Ireland) Act 1857	The whole act.
45 & 46 Vict. c. 26	Election of Representative Peers (Ireland) Act 1882	The whole act.
Acts of Parliament of Ireland
40 Geo. 3. c. 29 (I)	Parliamentary Representation Act (Ireland) 1800	The preamble. Sections 1 and 4.
40 Geo. 3. c. 38 (I)	Act of Union (Ireland) 1800	In Article IV of the Treaty of Union as set out in section 1, the first paragraph; the third paragraph; in the fourth paragraph, the words from " unless he " to " united kingdom " and the words from " nor be " onwards; in the ninth paragraph (that is, the paragraph beginning with the words " That when his Majesty "), the words " lords temporal and ", in both places where they occur; and in the last paragraph, the words from the beginning to the words " Great Britain; and " where those words first occur. Section 2 from the words " Whereas it is agreed " to " the place so vacant ". Section 5.

==== Part II: Ecclesiastical enactments ====
Part II — Ecclesiastical enactments
Citation	Short title	Description	Extent of repeal
29 Cha. 2. c. 8	Augmentation of Benefices Act 1677	The Augmentation of Benefices Act 1677.	The whole act.
13 Ann. c. 11 (Note: This is the citation in The Statutes of the Realm.)	Simony Act 1713	The Simony Act 1713.	The whole act.
24 Geo. 2. c. 23	Calendar (New Style) Act 1750	The Calendar (New Style) Act 1750.	In each of the annexed calendars for the month, the words " with the Table of Lessons " and the Table of Lessons.
5 Geo. 3. c. 17	Ecclesiastical Leases Act 1765	The Ecclesiastical Leases Act 1765.	The whole act.
17 Geo. 3. c. 53	Clergy Residences Repair Act 1776	The Clergy Residences Repair Act 1776.	Section 14.
53 Geo. 3. c. 127	Ecclesiastical Courts Act 1813	The Ecclesiastical Courts Act 1813.	The whole act.
54 Geo. 3. c. 170	Poor Relief Act 1814	The Poor Relief Act 1814.	The whole act.
6 Geo. 4. c. 8	Glebe Exchange Act 1825	The Glebe Exchange Act 1825.	Section 3.
7 Geo. 4. c. 66	Clergy Residence Act 1826	The Clergy Residence Act 1826.	The whole act.
1 & 2 Will. 4. c. 45	Augmentation of Benefices Act 1831	The Augmentation of Benefices Act 1831.	The whole act.
5 & 6 Will. 4. c. 62	Statutory Declarations Act 1835	The Statutory Declarations Act 1835.	Section 9.
1 & 2 Vict. c. 20	Queen Anne's Bounty Act 1838	The Queen Anne's Bounty Act 1838.	Section 21.
1 & 2 Vict. c. 23	Parsonages Act 1838	The Parsonages Act 1838.	Section 12.
1 & 2 Vict. c. 106	Pluralities Act 1838	The Pluralities Act 1838.	Sections 104 and 105. Schedule 1.
5 & 6 Vict. c. 4	Bishoprics, etc., in West Indies Act 1842	An Act to provide for the increase of the number of bishoprics and archdeaconries in the West Indies, and to amend the several Acts relating thereto.	The whole act.
17 & 18 Vict. c. 84	Augmentation of Benefices Act 1854	The Augmentation of Benefices Act 1854.	The whole act.
26 & 27 Vict. c. 36	London Diocese Act 1863	The London Diocese Act 1863.	The whole act.
28 & 29 Vict. c. 68	Ecclesiastical Commissioners (Superannuation) Act 1865	The Ecclesiastical Commissioners (Superannuation) Act 1865.	The whole act.
28 & 29 Vict. c. 69	Parsonages Act 1865	The Parsonages Act 1865.	Section 5.
33 & 34 Vict. c. 89	Queen Anne's Bounty (Superannuation) Act 1870	The Queen Anne's Bounty (Superannuation) Act 1870.	The whole act.
44 & 45 Vict. c. 25	Incumbents and Benefices Loans Extension Act 1881	The Incumbents and Benefices Loans Extension Act 1881.	The whole act.
4 & 5 Geo. 5. c. 5	Superannuation (Ecclesiastical Commissioners and Queen Anne's Bounty) Act 1914	The Superannuation (Ecclesiastical Commissioners and Queen Anne's Bounty) Act 1914.	The whole act.
23 & 24 Geo. 5. c. 47	Superannuation (Ecclesiastical Commissioners and Queen Anne's Bounty) Act 1933	The Superannuation (Ecclesiastical Commissioners and Queen Anne's Bounty) Act 1933.	The whole act.
14 & 15 Geo. 6. c. 39	Common Informers Act 1951	The Common Informers Act 1951.	In the Schedule, the entries relating to section 10 of the Act of Uniformity 1662 and section 9 of the Ecclesiastical Courts Act 1813.
7 & 8 Eliz. 2. c. 72	Mental Health Act 1959	The Mental Health Act 1959.	In Schedule 5, the entries relating to section 14 of the Clergy Residences Repair Act 1776, sections 1 and 3 of the Clergy Residence Act 1826 and section 12 of the Parsonages Act 1838.
Church Assembly Measure
1963 No. 2	Cathedrals Measure 1963	The Cathedrals Measure 1963.	In Schedule 1, the entry relating to the Ecclesiastical Leases Act 1765.

==== Part III: Enactments relating to banking ====
Part III — Enactments relating to banking
Citation	Short title	Extent of repeal
55 Geo. 3. c. 184	Stamp Act 1815	The following provisions in their application to England and Wales:— Sections 24, 27 and 28. Part I of the Schedule.
7 Geo. 4. c. 6	Bank Notes Act 1826	Section 4. In section 5, the words from " and which " to " Majesty ".
7 & 8 Vict. c. 32	Bank Charter Act 1844	Sections 23 and 24. Schedules (B) and (C).
8 & 9 Vict. c. 38	Bank Notes (Scotland) Act 1845	Section 19.
17 & 18 Vict. c. 83	Stamp Act 1854	The whole act in its application to England and Wales.
19 & 20 Vict. c. 20	Bankers' Compositions Act 1856	The whole act.
26 & 27 Vict. c. 105	Promissory Notes Act 1863	The whole act.
27 & 28 Vict. c. 20	Promissory Notes (Ireland) Act 1864	The whole act.
12 & 13 Geo. 5. c. 50	Expiring Laws Act 1922	In Schedule 1, the entries relating to the Promissory Notes Act 1863 and the Promissory Notes (Ireland) Act 1864.

==== Part IV: Enactments relating to the payment of annuities, &c. ====
Part IV — Enactments relating to the payment of annuities, &c.
Citation	Short title	Description	Extent of repeal
37 & 38 Vict. c. 12	East India Annuity Funds Act 1874	The East India Annuity Funds Act 1874.	The whole act.
41 & 42 Vict. c. 46	Duke of Connaught and of Strathearn (Establishment) Act 1878	The Duke of Connaught and of Strathearn (Establishment) Act 1878.	The whole act.
41 & 42 Vict. c. 47	Elders' Widows' Fund (India) Act 1878	The Elders' Widows' Fund (India) Act 1878.	The whole act.
48 & 49 Vict. c. 24	Annuity for Princess Beatrice Act 1885	An Act to enable Her Majesty to settle an annuity on Her Royal Highness the Princess Beatrice Victoria Feodore.	The whole act.
58 & 59 Vict. c. 10	Mr. Speaker's Retirement Act 1895	Mr. Speaker's Retirement Act 1895.	The whole act.
60 & 61 Vict. c. 11	Regular and Elders' Widows' Funds Act 1897	The Regular and Elders' Widows' Funds Act 1897.	The whole act.
26 Geo. 5 & 1 Edw. 8. c. 2	Government of India Act 1935	The Government of India Act 1935.	In section 274, the words " the East India Annuity Funds Act 1874 ". Section 284.
4 & 5 Eliz. 2. c. 11	Sudan (Special Payments) Act 1955	The Sudan (Special Payments) Act 1955.	In the title, the words from " to provide " to " Parliament of the Sudan; ". Section 1. In section 3, the words from " Any gratuity " to " Act, and ".

==== Part V: War-time and emergency enactments ====
Part V — War-time and emergency enactments
Citation	Short title	Extent of repeal
6 & 7 Geo. 5. c. 63	Defence of the Realm (Acquisition of Land) Act 1916	In section 15(c), the words " and the Secretary for Scotland for the Board of Agriculture and Fisheries ".
8 & 9 Geo. 5. c. 59	Termination of the Present War (Definition) Act 1918	Section 1(2).
9 & 10 Geo. 5. c. 92	Aliens Restriction (Amendment) Act 1919	Section 2(2). Section 7. Section 14(2). Section 15. Section 16(2).
21 & 22 Geo. 5. c. 48	National Economy Act 1931	The whole act.
2 & 3 Geo. 6. c. 70	Ships and Aircraft (Transfer Restriction) Act 1939	In the title, the words " and aircraft and parts of aircraft ". In section 4(1)(b)(i), the words from " or any territory " to " United Kingdom ". Section 4(2). In section 6(4), the words " as the case may be ". In section 8(1), the words " or section three ". In section 9(1), the words " respectively ", " his or " and " as the case may be ". In section 10, the words " or aircraft ". Section 11(1)(e). In section 12, the definition of " aircraft ".
2 & 3 Geo. 6. c. 112	Education (Emergency) (Scotland) Act 1939	The whole act.
2 & 3 Geo. 6. c. 119	Chartered and Other Bodies (Temporary Provisions) Act 1939	The whole act.
3 & 4 Geo. 6. c. 16	Special Enactments (Extension of Time) Act 1940	The whole act.
3 & 4 Geo. 6. c. 55	Securities (Validation) Act 1940	The whole act.
4 & 5 Geo. 6. c. 19	Chartered and Other Bodies (Temporary Provisions) Act 1941	The whole act.
4 & 5 Geo. 6. c. 24	Liabilities (War-Time Adjustment) Act 1941	The whole act.
7 & 8 Geo. 6. c. 40	Liabilities (War-Time Adjustment) Act 1944	The whole act.
8 & 9 Geo. 6. c. 29	Liabilities (War-Time Adjustment) (Scotland) Act 1945	The whole act.
8 & 9 Geo. 6. c. 31	Emergency Powers (Defence) Act 1945	The whole act.
8 & 9 Geo. 6. c. 43	Requisitioned Land and War Works Act 1945	Sections 1 to 14. Sections 26 to 31 except section 28(1) and (3)(a). Sections 35, 51 and 56. Section 60(5) to (8) and (13). Section 61(2), (3) and (5).
9 & 10 Geo. 6. c. 26	Emergency Laws (Transitional Provisions) Act 1946	In Schedule 2, the entry relating to the Food and Drugs Act 1938; paragraph 1 of the entry relating to land drainage enactments; and the entry relating to the Agricultural Returns Act 1925.
9 & 10 Geo. 6. c. 79	Public Notaries (War Service of Articled Clerks) Act 1946	The whole act.
11 & 12 Geo. 6. c. 17	Requisitioned Land and War Works Act 1948	Section 1(1) and (2)(a). Section 19(6). In the Schedule, in paragraph 1, the words " subsection (2) of section eight and of "; paragraphs 2 to 5; and paragraph 8.
1964 c. 60	Emergency Laws (Re-enactments and Repeals) Act 1964	Section 17(2).

==== Part VI: Expiring Laws Continuance Acts ====
Part VI — Expiring Laws Continuance Acts
Citation	Short title	Extent of repeal
11 & 12 Eliz. 2. c. 3	Expiring Laws Continuance Act 1962	The whole act.
1963 c. 58	Expiring Laws Continuance Act 1963	The whole act.
1964 c. 94	Expiring Laws Continuance Act 1964	The whole act.
1965 c. 77	Expiring Laws Continuance Act 1965	The whole act.
1966 c. 40	Expiring Laws Continuance Act 1966	The whole act.
1967 c. 89	Expiring Laws Continuance Act 1967	The whole act.
1968 c. 76	Expiring Laws Continuance Act 1968	The whole act.

==== Part VII: Consolidated Fund and Appropriation Acts ====
Part VII — Consolidated Fund and Appropriation Acts
Citation	Short title	Extent of repeal
1963 c. 1	Consolidated Fund Act 1963	The whole act.
1963 c. 8	Consolidated Fund (No. 2) Act 1963	The whole act.
1963 c. 26	Appropriation Act 1963	The whole act.
1964 c. 1	Consolidated Fund Act 1964	The whole act.
1964 c. 17	Consolidated Fund (No. 2) Act 1964	The whole act.
1964 c. 62	Appropriation Act 1964	The whole act.
1965 c. 1	Consolidated Fund Act 1965	The whole act.
1965 c. 8	Consolidated Fund (No. 2) Act 1965	The whole act.
1965 c. 23	Appropriation Act 1965	The whole act.
1966 c. 1	Consolidated Fund Act 1966	The whole act.
1966 c. 3	Appropriation Act 1966	The whole act.
1966 c. 26	Appropriation (No. 2) Act 1966	The whole act.
1967 c. 2	Consolidated Fund Act 1967	The whole act.
1967 c. 6	Consolidated Fund (No. 2) Act 1967	The whole act.
1967 c. 59	Appropriation Act 1967	The whole act.
1968 c. 1	Consolidated Fund Act 1968	The whole act.
1968 c. 15	Consolidated Fund (No. 2) Act 1968	The whole act.
1969 c. 3	Consolidated Fund Act 1969	The whole act.
1969 c. 9	Consolidated Fund (No. 2) Act 1969	The whole act.

==== Part VIII: Finance Acts ====
Part VIII — Finance Acts
Citation	Short title	Extent of repeal
6 Edw. 7. c. 20	Revenue Act 1906	The whole act.
10 Edw. 7 & 1 Geo. 5. c. 8	Finance (1909–10) Act 1910	Section 46. In section 96(2), the words from the beginning to " Excise, and "; and the word " other ".
5 & 6 Geo. 5. c. 62	Finance Act 1915	The whole act.
6 & 7 Geo. 5. c. 24	Finance Act 1916	Section 69(1).
11 & 12 Geo. 5. c. 32	Finance Act 1921	In section 65(1), the words from " Part I " to " those duties ".
17 & 18 Geo. 5. c. 10	Finance Act 1927	Section 57(1).
21 & 22 Geo. 5. c. 28	Finance Act 1931	Section 1(2). Section 44(1).
23 & 24 Geo. 5. c. 19	Finance Act 1933	Section 46.
5 & 6 Geo. 6. c. 21	Finance Act 1942	Section 10(1). Section 49(2).
6 & 7 Geo. 6. c. 28	Finance Act 1943	Section 31(2).
7 & 8 Geo. 6. c. 23	Finance Act 1944	Section 49(2).
9 & 10 Geo. 6. c. 13	Finance (No. 2) Act 1945	Section 62(2).
9 & 10 Geo. 6. c. 64	Finance Act 1946	Section 9(3). Section 11. Section 67(2).
11 & 12 Geo. 6. c. 9	Finance (No. 2) Act 1947	In section 9(2), the words from " and in this Act " onwards.
11 & 12 Geo. 6. c. 49	Finance Act 1948	Section 1(7). Section 82(2).
12, 13 & 14 Geo. 6. c. 47	Finance Act 1949	Section 14. Section 15(1)(a). In section 15(3), the words " the Hawkers Act 1888, or ". Section 15(5).
14 & 15 Geo. 6. c. 43	Finance Act 1951	Section 44(6).
15 & 16 Geo. 6 & 1 Eliz. 2. c. 33	Finance Act 1952	Section 76(2).
2 & 3 Eliz. 2. c. 44	Finance Act 1954	Section 35(2).
4 & 5 Eliz. 2. c. 54	Finance Act 1956	Section 3.
6 & 7 Eliz. 2. c. 56	Finance Act 1958	Section 39.
8 & 9 Eliz. 2. c. 44	Finance Act 1960	Sections 4 and 8.
9 & 10 Eliz. 2. c. 36	Finance Act 1961	Section 1. Section 2(2) to (9). Section 10. In section 11(1), the word " hawker's ". Schedule 1.
10 & 11 Eliz. 2. c. 44	Finance Act 1962	Section 1(2)(e).
1964 c. 49	Finance Act 1964	Section 5(2) and (3). Section 9.
1967 c. 54	Finance Act 1967	Section 10. Part V of Schedule 16.

==== Part IX: Miscellaneous enactments ====
Part IX — Miscellaneous enactments
Citation	Short title	Description	Extent of repeal
16 Geo. 2. c. 31	Prison (Escape) Act 1742	The Prison (Escape) Act 1742.	The whole act.
41 Geo. 3. c. 32	Irish Charges Act 1801	The Irish Charges Act 1801.	In section 1, all the specified items except that which authorises payment of the rent of grounds near Carrickfergus Castle.
48 Geo. 3. c. 140	Dublin Police Magistrates Act 1808	The Dublin Police Magistrates Act 1808.	Section 14.
52 Geo. 3. c. 146	Parochial Registers Act 1812	The Parochial Registers Act 1812.	Section 18.
59 Geo. 3. c. 86	Dean Forest Act 1819	An Act for regulating the exercise of the right of common of pasture in the New Forest, in the county of Southampton, for repealing certain parts of two Acts passed in the 39th and 40th and the 52nd years of His present Majesty; and for the better collection and recovery of the gale rents in the forest of Dean, in the county of Gloucester.	In the title, the words from " for regulating " to " His present Majesty; and ". The preamble. In section 7, the words " now due and owing or,", the words " to His Majesty " and the words from " and in case the goods and chattels distrained shall be replevied " onwards. In section 8, the words " now due, or " and the words from " and in all such actions " onwards. Sections 9 to 11.
1 & 2 Geo. 4. c. 41	Steam Engine Furnaces Act 1821	The Steam Engine Furnaces Act 1821.	The whole act.
10 Geo. 4. c. 44	Metropolitan Police Act 1829	The Metropolitan Police Act 1829.	Sections 6, 7 and 35.
5 & 6 Will. 4. c. 62	Statutory Declarations Act 1835	The Statutory Declarations Act 1835.	Sections 6 and 10.
3 & 4 Vict. c. 85	Chimney Sweepers and Chimneys Regulation Act 1840	The Chimney Sweepers and Chimneys Regulation Act 1840.	The whole act.
7 & 8 Vict. c. 33	County Rates Act 1844	The County Rates Act 1844.	The whole act.
8 & 9 Vict. c. 56	Land Drainage Act 1845	The Land Drainage Act 1845.	The whole act.
14 & 15 Vict. c. 25	Landlord and Tenant Act 1851	The Landlord and Tenant Act 1851.	Sections 1 and 3.
14 & 15 Vict. c. 105	Poor Law Amendment Act 1851	The Poor Law Amendment Act 1851.	The whole act.
16 & 17 Vict. c. 107	Customs Consolidation Act 1853	The Customs Consolidation Act 1853.	Section 327.
16 & 17 Vict. c. 129	Pilotage Law Amendment Act 1853	The Pilotage Law Amendment Act 1853.	Sections 10 and 13.
17 & 18 Vict. c. 94	Public Revenue and Consolidated Fund Charges Act 1854	The Public Revenue and Consolidated Fund Charges Act 1854.	In Schedule (B), the words "Allowance in aid of the Royal Irish Academy, Dublin ... 40 Geo. 3. c. 60, 41 Geo. 3. c. 32 ".
24 & 25 Vict. c. 121	Domicile Act 1861	The Domicile Act 1861.	Sections 1 to 3.
25 & 26 Vict. c. 53	Land Registry Act 1862	The Land Registry Act 1862.	Sections 108 to 113.
26 & 27 Vict. c. 101	Land Tax Commissioners (Appointment) Act 1863	An Act to appoint additional commissioners for executing the Acts for granting a land tax and other rates and taxes.	The whole act.
27 & 28 Vict. c. 37	Chimney Sweepers Regulation Act 1864	The Chimney Sweepers Regulation Act 1864.	The whole act.
27 & 28 Vict. c. 101	Highway Act 1864	The Highway Act 1864.	The whole act.
28 & 29 Vict. c. 48	Courts of Justice Building Act 1865	The Courts of Justice Building Act 1865.	The whole act.
31 & 32 Vict. c. 32	Endowed Schools Act 1868	The Endowed Schools Act 1868.	The whole act.
38 & 39 Vict. c. 70	Chimney Sweepers Act 1875	The Chimney Sweepers Act 1875.	The whole act.
39 & 40 Vict. c. 20	Statute Law Revision (Substituted Enactments) Act 1876	The Statute Law Revision (Substituted Enactments) Act 1876.	Section 5.
39 & 40 Vict. c. 23	Prevention of Crimes Amendment Act 1876	The Prevention of Crimes Amendment Act 1876.	The whole act.
39 & 40 Vict. c. 35	Customs Tariff Act 1876	The Customs Tariff Act 1876.	The whole act.
54 & 55 Vict. c. 69	Penal Servitude Act 1891	The Penal Servitude Act 1891.	Section 9. In section 11, the words from " and this Act " onwards.
57 & 58 Vict. c. 51	Chimney Sweepers Act 1894	The Chimney Sweepers Act 1894.	The whole act.
59 & 60 Vict. c. 31	Housing of the Working Classes Act 1890 Amendment (Scotland) Act 1896	The Housing of the Working Classes Act 1890 Amendment (Scotland) Act 1896.	The whole act.
16 & 17 Geo. 5. c. 15	Criminal Appeal (Scotland) Act 1926	The Criminal Appeal (Scotland) Act 1926.	Section 12(4).
16 & 17 Geo. 5. c. 43	Public Health (Smoke Abatement) Act 1926	The Public Health (Smoke Abatement) Act 1926.	In section 12(2), the words from " but save " onwards.
22 & 23 Geo. 5. c. 55	Administration of Justice Act 1932	The Administration of Justice Act 1932.	Section 5.
23 & 24 Geo. 5. c. 10	Russian Goods (Import Prohibition) Act 1933	The Russian Goods (Import Prohibition) Act 1933.	The whole act.
25 & 26 Geo. 5. c. 46	Money Payments (Justices Procedure) Act 1935	The Money Payments (Justices Procedure) Act 1935.	The whole act.
26 Geo. 5 & 1 Edw. 8. c. 20	Electricity Supply (Meters) Act 1936	The Electricity Supply (Meters) Act 1936.	In section 1(1), the words " Not later than the appointed day " and the word " thereafter ". Section 1(2). Section 3. In section 4(1), the definition of " The appointed day "
26 Geo. 5 & 1 Edw. 8. c. 44	Air Navigation Act 1936	The Air Navigation Act 1936.	Section 24(1) and (3).
10 & 11 Geo. 6. c. 53	Town and Country Planning (Scotland) Act 1947	The Town and Country Planning (Scotland) Act 1947.	In subsections (2), (4) and (5) of section 22, the words " under the last foregoing subsection ".
10 & 11 Geo. 6. c. 54	Electricity Act 1947	The Electricity Act 1947.	Section 52.
11 & 12 Geo. 6. c. 31	Cotton Spinning (Re-equipment Subsidy) Act 1948	The Cotton Spinning (Re-equipment Subsidy) Act 1948.	The whole act, except so far as applied by section 2(6) of the Cotton Industry Act 1959.
12 & 13 Geo. 6. c. 59	Licensing Act 1949	The Licensing Act 1949.	The whole act.
14 Geo. 6. c. 21	Miscellaneous Financial Provisions Act 1950	The Miscellaneous Financial Provisions Act 1950.	Section 4.
15 & 16 Geo. 6 & 1 Eliz. 2. c. 32	Electricity Supply (Meters) Act 1952	The Electricity Supply (Meters) Act 1952.	The whole act.
15 & 16 Geo. 6 & 1 Eliz. 2. c. 44	Customs and Excise Act 1952	The Customs and Excise Act 1952.	In Schedule 10, in Part II, paragraphs 3, 9, 10, 19, 20, 23 and 28.
2 & 3 Eliz. 2. c. 42	Slaughterhouses Act 1954	The Slaughterhouses Act 1954.	Section 3(5). Schedule 1.
2 & 3 Eliz. 2. c. 72	Town and Country Planning Act 1954	The Town and Country Planning Act 1954.	Section 55. Section 61(1) and (6). Section 63. In section 69(1), all the definitions other than such of the following as are in force at the passing of this Act, namely those of " compulsory acquisition ", " interest in land ", " the Minister ", " principal Act ", " public authority possessing compulsory purchase powers ", " royalty ", " full restoring lease " and " ironstone district "; and in the definition of " the Minister ", the words " (subject to subsection (8) of this section) ". Section 70. In section 72(2), the words from " and different days " onwards. In section 72(3), the words from " and may " onwards. In section 72(4), the words " except section sixty-three thereof ".
2 & 3 Eliz. 2. c. 73	Town and Country Planning (Scotland) Act 1954	The Town and Country Planning (Scotland) Act 1954.	Sections 57 and 63.
4 & 5 Eliz. 2. c. 8	County Courts Act 1955	The County Courts Act 1955.	The whole act.
4 & 5 Eliz. 2. c. 16	Food and Drugs Act 1955	The Food and Drugs Act 1955.	In section 67, the words " Subject to the provisions of this section ", in subsection (1); and subsection (2). Section 136(3). In Schedule 12, paragraph 7.
4 & 5 Eliz. 2. c. 67	Road Traffic Act 1956	The Road Traffic Act 1956.	Section 4(5).
6 & 7 Eliz. 2. c. 1	National Insurance (No. 2) Act 1957	The National Insurance (No. 2) Act 1957.	The whole act.
9 & 10 Eliz. 2. c. 17	Betting Levy Act 1961	The Betting Levy Act 1961.	Section 9.
1964 c. 48	Police Act 1964	The Police Act 1964.	In Schedule 8, the entry relating to the river Tyne in columns 1 to 4; and the words from " and the ' river Tyne ' " to " Tyne Improvement Commissioners ".

== Subsequent developments ==
The enactments which were repealed (whether for the whole or any part of the United Kingdom) by the act were repealed so far as they extended to the Isle of Man by section 1(1) of, and schedule 1 to, the Statute Law Revision (Isle of Man) Act 1991, which came into force on 25 July 1991.

The whole act was repealed by section 1(1) of, and group 2 of part IX of schedule 1 to, the Statute Law (Repeals) Act 1998, which came into force on 19 November 1998.

== See also ==
- Statute Law (Repeals) Act

== Bibliography ==
- Halsbury's Statutes,
- The Public General Acts and Church Assembly Measures 1971. HMSO. London. 1972.
- John Burke (General editor). Current Law Statutes Annotated 1971. Sweet & Maxwell, Stevens & sons. London. W Green & son. Edinburgh. 1971.
- HL Deb vol 314, cols 1123 to 1127, vol 320, cols 715 to 737, HC Deb vol 821, cols 103 to 106.
