= Clergy Residences Repair Act 1776 =

Act of the Parliament of Great Britain

Clergy Residences Repair Act 1776 (Note: The citation of this act by this short title was authorised by section 1 of, and the first schedule to, the Short Titles Act 1896. Due to the repeal of those provisions it is now authorised by section 19(2) of the Interpretation Act 1978.)
- Act of Parliament
- Parliament of Great Britain
- Long title: An Act to promote the Residence of the Parochial Clergy, by making Provision for the more speedy and effectual building, re-building, repairing or purchasing Houses, and other necessary Buildings and Tenements, for the Use of their Benefices.
- Citation: 17 Geo. 3. c. 53
- Territorial extent: Great Britain

Dates
- Royal assent: 6 June 1777
- Commencement: 24 June 1777 (Note: Section 1.)
Other legislation
Amended by	Parsonages Measure 1938 (No. 3); Statute Law (Repeals) Act 1971; Endowments and Glebe Measure 1976 (No. 4)

Status: Partially repealed

Text of statute as originally enacted

Revised text of statute as amended

Text of the Clergy Residences Repair Act 1776 as in force today (including any amendments) within the United Kingdom, from legislation.gov.uk.

The Clergy Residences Repair Act 1776 (17 Geo. 3. c. 53), also known as the Gilbert Act, is an act of the Parliament of Great Britain that improved the regulation of the building of clergy houses.

== Subsequent developments ==
The Select Committee on Temporary Laws described this act as a consolidation act.

Section 14 of the act was repealed by section 1 of, and the part II of the schedule to, the Statute Law (Repeals) Act 1971, which came into force on 27 July 1971.
