= European Parliamentary Elections Act 2002 =

Repealed United Kingdom electoral law

European Parliamentary Elections Act 2002 (Note: Section 18(1).)
- Act of Parliament
- Parliament of the United Kingdom
- Long title: An Act to consolidate the European Parliamentary Elections Acts 1978, 1993 and 1999.
- Citation: 2002 c. 24
- Territorial extent: United Kingdom; Gibraltar

Dates
- Royal assent: 24 July 2002
- Commencement: 24 October 2002 (Note: Section 18(2).)
- Repealed: 31 January 2020 (Note: The European Union (Withdrawal) Act 2018 and European Union (Withdrawal Agreement) Act 2020 (Commencement, Transitional and Savings Provisions) Regulations 2020 (SI 2020/1622).)
Other legislation
| Amends | Scotland Act 1998; See § Repealed enactments |
| Repeals/revokes | See § Repealed enactments |
| Amended by | Government of Wales Act 2006 |
| Repealed by | European Union (Withdrawal) Act 2018 |

Status: Repealed

Text of statute as originally enacted

Revised text of statute as amended

The European Parliamentary Elections Act 2002 (c. 24) was an act of the Parliament of the United Kingdom governing elections to the European Parliament.

The act consolidated the law in relation to elections to the European Parliament.

The act divided the United Kingdom into various regions to which were allocated a number of seats. England was divided into nine regions with a total of 71 seats. Scotland, Wales and Northern Ireland each constituted a single region, with 8, 5 and 3 seats respectively. For the first time the Act allowed the participation of Gibraltar, which was placed within the South West England region for the purpose of the elections.

The act was repealed by the European Union (Withdrawal) Act 2018 on 31 January 2020, and the 2019 European Parliament election was the last to be held under the former legislation.

== Provisions ==
=== Repealed enactments ===
Section 16 of the act repealed 8 enactments and revoked 2 instruments, listed in schedule 4 to the act.

| Citation | Short title | Extent of repeal or revocation |
|---|---|---|
| 1978 c. 10 | European Assembly Elections Act 1978 | The whole act. |
| 1983 c. 2 | Representation of the People Act 1983 | In Schedule 8, paragraphs 21 to 23. |
| 1993 c. 38 | Welsh Language Act 1993 | Section 35(3). |
| 1993 c. 41 | European Parliamentary Elections Act 1993 | Section 3. |
| SI 1994/342 | European Parliamentary Elections (Changes to the Franchise and Qualification of Representatives) Regulations 1994 | Regulation 3. |
| 1999 c. 1 | European Parliamentary Elections Act 1999 | The whole act. |
| 2000 c. 2 | Representation of the People Act 2000 | In Schedule 6, paragraph 2. |
| 2000 c. 41 | Political Parties, Elections and Referendums Act 2000 | Section 142. |
| 2000 c. 41 | Political Parties, Elections and Referendums Act 2000 | In Schedule 21, paragraph 5. |
| 2001 c. 13 | House of Commons (Removal of Clergy Disqualification) Act 2001 | In Schedule 1, paragraph 2. |
| SI 2001/1184 | European Parliamentary Elections (Franchise of Relevant Citizens of the Union) Regulations 2001 | Regulation 11(a). |

== 2011 AV and 2016 EU referendums ==
The legal provisions for the appointment of "Regional returning officers" and also the twelve European Parliamentary Regional constituencies areas of the United Kingdom under this Act were also used under the titles of "Regional counting officers" and "Regional count areas" in the legislation enacted for the holding of both the 2011 AV Referendum under the Parliamentary Voting System and Constituencies Act 2011 and the 2016 EU Referendum under the European Union Referendum Act 2015.

== Repeal ==
In a result of the referendum on the United Kingdom's membership of the European Union on 23 June 2016, the act was repealed by the European Union (Withdrawal) Act 2018, however initially it was only partially repealed and was not fully repealed until 31 January 2020 when the United Kingdom formally left the European Union.

The whole act was repealed by section 25(4) of, and schedule 9 to, the European Union (Withdrawal) Act 2018. Section 1A and schedule 1A, which had been inserted by subsequent legislation, were repealed on 4 July 2018. (Note: The European Union (Withdrawal) Act 2018 (Commencement No. 1) Order 2018 (SI 2018/808), reg. 3(i).) The remainder of the act was repealed on 31 December 2020. (Note: The European Union (Withdrawal) Act 2018 (Commencement No. 5 and Transitional Provisions and Savings) Regulations 2020 (SI 2020/1622), reg. 2.)

== See also ==
- Matthews v United Kingdom
- European Assembly Elections Act 1978
- European Parliamentary Elections Act 1993
- European Parliamentary Elections Act 1999
- European Union Act 2011
- European Communities Act 1972 (UK)
- Acts of Parliament of the United Kingdom relating to the European Communities and the European Union
