= European Parliamentary Elections Act 1993 =

Act of the Parliament of the United Kingdom

European Parliamentary Elections Act 1993 (Note: Section 3(1).)
- Act of Parliament
- Parliament of the United Kingdom
- Long title: An Act to give effect to a Decision of the Council of the European Communities, 93/81/Euratom, ECSC, EEC, of 1st February 1993 having the effect of increasing the number of United Kingdom representatives to be elected to the European Parliament; and for connected purposes.
- Citation: 1993 c. 41
- Territorial extent: United Kingdom

Dates
- Royal assent: 5 November 1993
- Commencement: 5 November 1993 (except section 1; 1 May 1994 (section 1).; (Note: Section 3(3). The European Parliamentary Elections Act 1993 (Commencement) Order 1994 (SI 1994/1089).)
- Repealed: 31 December 2020 (Note: The European Union (Withdrawal) Act 2018 and European Union (Withdrawal Agreement) Act 2020 (Commencement, Transitional and Savings Provisions) Regulations 2020 (SI 2020/1622).)
Other legislation
Amends	European Communities Act 1972; European Parliamentary Elections Act 1978
Amended by	European Parliamentary Elections Act 1999; European Parliamentary Elections Act 2002
Repealed by	European Union (Withdrawal) Act 2018

Status: Repealed

Text of statute as originally enacted

Revised text of statute as amended

The European Parliamentary Elections Act 1993 (c. 41) was an act of the Parliament of the United Kingdom that amended the procedures for European elections in the United Kingdom, amending the European Assembly Elections Act 1978. It received royal assent on 5 November 1993.

It was passed mainly to change the number of Members of the European Parliament (MEPs) elected from 81 to 87, changing the number of MEPs elected from England from 66 to 71 and from Wales from 4 to 5.

In order to draw the new constituency boundaries under the act, two parliamentary committees were established: a committee for England and committee for Wales.

== See also ==
- European Assembly Elections Act 1978
- European Parliamentary Elections Act 1999
- European Parliamentary Elections Act 2002
- Elections in the United Kingdom
- List of legislation in the United Kingdom
- Acts of Parliament of the United Kingdom relating to the European Communities and the European Union
