= European Parliamentary Elections Act 1999 =

Act of the Parliament of the United Kingdom

European Parliamentary Elections Act 1999 (Note: Section 6.)
- Act of Parliament
- Parliament of the United Kingdom
- Long title: An Act to amend the European Parliamentary Elections Act 1978 so as to alter the method used in Great Britain for electing Members of the European Parliament to make other amendments of enactments relating to the election of Members of the European Parliament and for connected purposes.
- Citation: 1999 c. 1
- Introduced by: Jack Straw (Commons)
- Territorial extent: United Kingdom

Dates
- Royal assent: 14 January 1999
- Commencement: 16 March 1999 (so much of section 1 of, and schedule 2 to, the act as confers any power to make subordinate legislation); 1 May 1999 (sections 1–4 and schedules 1–4); (Note: Section 5. The European Parliamentary Elections Act 1999 (Commencement) Order 1999 (SI 199/717.)
- Repealed: 24 October 2002
Other legislation
Amends	European Parliamentary Elections Act 1978; European Parliament (Pay and Pensions) Act 1979; Representation of the People Act 1985; Parliamentary Constituencies Act 1986; European Parliamentary Elections Act 1993; Local Government (Wales) Act 1994; European Parliamentary Elections (Changes to the Franchise and Qualification of Representatives) Regulations 1994
Repeals/revokes	European Assembly Elections Act 1981; European Parliamentary Elections Act 1993
Repealed by	European Parliamentary Elections Act 2002

Status: Repealed

Text of statute as originally enacted

Revised text of statute as amended

The European Parliamentary Elections Act 1999 (c. 1) was an act of the Parliament of the United Kingdom. The act amended the procedures for European elections in the United Kingdom. It received royal assent on 14 January 1999, after the Parliament Acts 1911 and 1949 had been invoked, as the House of Lords had rejected the bill six times, refusing to accept the change in the electoral system proposed. The Parliament Acts are rarely invoked; the European Parliamentary Elections Act was only the fifth statute since 1911 enacted under their provisions, and only the second since the Parliament Act 1949.

It was passed mainly to change the electoral system used for electing Members of the European Parliament (MEP)s from first past the post to a closed party list system in England, Scotland and Wales. The single transferable vote system was retained in Northern Ireland. The UK was divided into twelve electoral regions: nine in England (matching the regions of England), one in Scotland, one in Wales, and one in Northern Ireland.

The act led to a significant increase in the number of MEPs being returned from minor parties in the 1999 European elections, with more Liberal Democrats, along with the first European representatives for Plaid Cymru and the first national representatives for both the Green Party and the UK Independence Party.

== Subsequent developments ==
The whole act was repealed by section 16 of, and schedule 4 to, the European Parliamentary Elections Act 2002, which came into force on 24 October 2002.

== See also ==
- European Assembly Elections Act 1978
- European Parliamentary Elections Act 1993
- Elections in the United Kingdom
- Acts of Parliament of the United Kingdom relating to the European Communities and the European Union
- List of acts of the Parliament of the United Kingdom enacted without the House of Lords' consent
