= European Assembly Elections Act 1978 =

Act of the Parliament of the United Kingdom

European Assembly Elections Act 1978 (Note: Section 9(1).)
- Act of Parliament
- Parliament of the United Kingdom
- Long title: An Act to make provision for and in connection with the election of representatives to the Assembly of the European Communities, and to prevent any treaty providing for any increase in the powers of the Assembly from being ratified by the United Kingdom unless approved by Act of Parliament.
- Citation: 1978 c. 10
- Territorial extent: United Kingdom

Dates
- Royal assent: 5 May 1978
- Commencement: 5 May 1978 (Note: The Acts of Parliament (Commencement) Act 1793.)
- Repealed: 24 October 2002

Other legislation
- Amended by: Law Reform (Miscellaneous Provisions) (Scotland) Act 1980; European Communities (Amendment) Act 1986; Parliamentary Constituencies Act 1986; European Parliamentary Elections Act 1993; Registration of Political Parties Act 1998; European Parliamentary Elections Act 1999
- Repealed by: European Parliamentary Elections Act 2002

Status: Repealed

Text of statute as originally enacted

Revised text of statute as amended

The European Assembly Elections Act 1978 (c. 10) also known as the European Parliamentary Elections Act 1978 was an act of the Parliament of the United Kingdom that made provision for the holding of elections of representatives to the European Assembly from the United Kingdom. It made provision for the election of 81 "Representatives to the Assembly" (which would later become Members of the European Parliament (MEPs) to the European Assembly with 66 members being elected from England, 8 from Scotland, 4 from Wales using the first past the post electoral system in 78 one member constituencies and 3 members from Northern Ireland using the Single transferable vote in a single constituency. The act also prevented any increase in the powers of the Assembly from being ratified unless approved by a further Act of Parliament. The first elections took place on Thursday 7 June 1979.

The United Kingdom, with the exception of Northern Ireland, was the only member state which did not choose to use some form of proportional representation.

The subsequent elections had been meant to happen in 1978, but they were delayed due to the electoral system for Great Britain not being proportional.

== Subsequent developments ==
The whole act was repealed by section 16 of, and schedule 4 to, the European Parliamentary Elections Act 2002, which came into force on 24 October 2002.

== See also ==
- European Parliamentary Elections Act 1993
- European Parliamentary Elections Act 1999
- European Parliamentary Elections Act 2002
- Elections in the United Kingdom
- Acts of Parliament of the United Kingdom relating to the European Communities and the European Union
