= List of acts of the Parliament of the United Kingdom from 1944 =

This is a complete list of acts of the Parliament of the United Kingdom for the year 1944.

Note that the first parliament of the United Kingdom was held in 1801; parliaments between 1707 and 1800 were either parliaments of Great Britain or of Ireland. For acts passed up until 1707, see the list of acts of the Parliament of England and the list of acts of the Parliament of Scotland. For acts passed from 1707 to 1800, see the list of acts of the Parliament of Great Britain. See also the list of acts of the Parliament of Ireland.

For acts of the devolved parliaments and assemblies in the United Kingdom, see the list of acts of the Scottish Parliament, the list of acts of the Northern Ireland Assembly, and the list of acts and measures of Senedd Cymru; see also the list of acts of the Parliament of Northern Ireland.

The number shown after each act's title is its chapter number. Acts passed before 1963 are cited using this number, preceded by the year(s) of the reign during which the relevant parliamentary session was held; thus the Union with Ireland Act 1800 is cited as "39 & 40 Geo. 3. c. 67", meaning the 67th act passed during the session that started in the 39th year of the reign of George III and which finished in the 40th year of that reign. Note that the modern convention is to use Arabic numerals in citations (thus "41 Geo. 3" rather than "41 Geo. III"). Acts of the last session of the Parliament of Great Britain and the first session of the Parliament of the United Kingdom are both cited as "41 Geo. 3". Acts passed from 1963 onwards are simply cited by calendar year and chapter number.

== 7 & 8 Geo. 6 ==
Continuing the ninth session of the 37th Parliament of the United Kingdom, which met from 24 November 1943 until 28 November 1944.

This session was also traditionally cited as 7 & 8 G. 6.

=== Public general acts ===
Short title	Citation	Royal assent
Long title
Consolidated Fund (No. 1) Act 1944 (repealed)	7 & 8 Geo. 6. c. 4	1 February 1944
An Act to apply certain sums out of the Consolidated Fund to the service of the years ending on the thirty-first day of March, one thousand nine hundred and forty-four and one thousand nine hundred and forty-five. (Repealed by Statute Law Revision Act 1950 (14 Geo. 6. c. 6))
Landlord and Tenant (Requisitioned Land) Act 1944	7 & 8 Geo. 6. c. 5	1 March 1944
An Act to regulate the rights of the parties to leases of requisitioned land with respect to the making good of damage occurring during the requisition, and for purposes connected therewith.
Courts (Emergency Powers) (Scotland) Act 1944 (repealed)	7 & 8 Geo. 6. c. 6	1 March 1944
An Act to amend the Courts (Emergency Powers) (Scotland) Act, 1939. (Note: Courts (Emergency Powers) (Scotland) Act 1939 (2 & 3 Geo. 6. c. 113)) (Repealed by Statute Law Revision Act 1953 (2 & 3 Eliz. 2. c. 5))
Prize Salvage Act 1944	7 & 8 Geo. 6. c. 7	1 March 1944
An Act to prevent claims for prize salvage being made or relied upon without the consent of the Admiralty or the Secretary of State.
Guardianship (Refugee Children) Act 1944 (repealed)	7 & 8 Geo. 6. c. 8	1 March 1944
An Act to provide for the guardianship of infants who have come to the United Kingdom in consequence of war or persecution. (Repealed by Statute Law (Repeals) Act 1973 (c. 39))
Supreme Court of Judicature (Amendment) Act 1944 (repealed)	7 & 8 Geo. 6. c. 9	1 March 1944
An Act to amend the law regulating the number of puisne judges of the High Court and the attachment of such judges to the several divisions of that Court. (Repealed by Senior Courts Act 1981 (c. 54))
Disabled Persons (Employment) Act 1944	7 & 8 Geo. 6. c. 10	1 March 1944
An Act to make further and better provision for enabling persons handicapped by disablement to secure employment, or work on their own account, and for purposes connected therewith..
House of Commons Disqualification (Temporary Provisions) Act 1944 (repealed)	7 & 8 Geo. 6. c. 11	1 March 1944
An Act to continue the House of Commons Disqualification (Temporary Provisions) Act, 1941, (Note: House of Commons Disqualification (Temporary Provisions) Act 1941 (4 & 5 Geo. 6. c. 8)) and to provide for the laying before the Commons House of Parliament of annual returns of certificates issued under that Act. (Repealed by Statute Law Revision Act 1953 (2 & 3 Eliz. 2. c. 5))
Income Tax (Offices and Employments) Act 1944 (repealed)	7 & 8 Geo. 6. c. 12	1 March 1944
An Act to amend the law relating to income tax in respect of certain emoluments. (Repealed by Income Tax Act 1952 (15 & 16 Geo. 6 & 1 Eliz. 2. c. 10))
Naval Forces (Extension of Service) Act 1944 (repealed)	7 & 8 Geo. 6. c. 13	21 March 1944
An Act to extend the period of service of seamen, marines and members of the naval reserves serving during the war period, and to make further provision as to the recall into service during that period of members of those reserves. (Repealed by Navy, Army and Air Force Reserves Act 1954 (2 & 3 Eliz. 2. c. 10))
India (Attachment of States) Act 1944 (repealed)	7 & 8 Geo. 6. c. 14	21 March 1944
An Act to render legal the attachment of certain Indian States to other Indian States. (Repealed by Statute Law (Repeals) Act 1976 (c. 16))
Reinstatement in Civil Employment Act 1944 (repealed)	7 & 8 Geo. 6. c. 15	21 March 1944
An Act to make provision for the reinstatement in civil employment of certain persons who are, or have been, in the service of the Crown or in a civil defence force; and for purposes connected with the matter aforesaid. (Repealed by Statute Law (Repeals) Act 1981 (c. 19))
Public Works Loans Act 1944	7 & 8 Geo. 6. c. 16	21 March 1944
An Act to grant money for the purpose of certain local loans out of the Local Loans Fund and for other purposes relating to local loans, and to enable the functions of the secretary of the Public Works Loan Commissioners to be performed, in the event of his inability to act, by an assistant secretary.
Consolidated Fund (No. 2) Act 1944 (repealed)	7 & 8 Geo. 6. c. 17	29 March 1944
An Act to apply certain sums out of the Consolidated Fund to the service of the years ending on the thirty-first day of March, one thousand nine hundred and forty-four and one thousand nine hundred and forty-five. (Repealed by Statute Law Revision Act 1950 (14 Geo. 6. c. 6))
Army and Air Force (Annual) Act 1944 (repealed)	7 & 8 Geo. 6. c. 18	26 April 1944
An Act to provide, during twelve months, for the discipline and regulation of the Army and the Air Force. (Repealed by Statute Law Revision Act 1950 (14 Geo. 6. c. 6) and Revision of the Army and Air Force Acts (Transitional Provisions) Act 1955 (3 & 4 Eliz. 2. c. 20))
National Loans Act 1944 (repealed)	7 & 8 Geo. 6. c. 19	10 May 1944
An Act to extend the powers of the Treasury to raise money under section one of the National Loans Act, 1939. (Note: National Loans Act 1939 (2 & 3 Geo. 6. c. 117)) (Repealed by National Loans Act 1968 (c. 13))
Consolidated Fund (No. 3) Act 1944 (repealed)	7 & 8 Geo. 6. c. 20	24 May 1944
An Act to apply a sum out of the Consolidated Fund to the service of the year ending on the thirty-first day of March, one thousand nine hundred and forty-five. (Repealed by Statute Law Revision Act 1950 (14 Geo. 6. c. 6))
Pensions (Increase) Act 1944 (repealed)	7 & 8 Geo. 6. c. 21	24 May 1944
An Act to provide for the increase of certain pensions payable in respect of public service. (Repealed by Pensions (Increase) Act 1971 (c. 56))
Police and Firemen (War Service) Act 1944 (repealed)	7 & 8 Geo. 6. c. 22	24 May 1944
An Act to amend the Police and Firemen (War Service) Act, 1939, (Note: Police and Firemen (War Service) Act 1939 (2 & 3 Geo. 6. c. 103)) and, in connection therewith, to Amend certain other enactments. (Repealed by Statute Law (Repeals) Act 2008 (c. 12))
Finance Act 1944	7 & 8 Geo. 6. c. 23	13 July 1944
An Act to grant certain duties, to alter other duties, and to amend the law relating to the Public Revenue and the National Debt, and to make further provision in connection with Finance.
Parliamentary Electors (War-Time Registration) Act 1944 (repealed)	7 & 8 Geo. 6. c. 24	13 July 1944
An Act to make temporary amendments of the Parliamentary Electors (War-Time Registration) Act, 1943, (Note: Parliament (Elections and Meeting) Act 1943 (6 & 7 Geo. 6. c. 48)) as to the qualifying date for an election and the qualifications required for registration in the civilian residence and business premises registers, and to provide for matters consequential thereon. (Repealed by Representation of the People Act 1948 (11 & 12 Geo. 6. c. 65))
Law Officers Act 1944	7 & 8 Geo. 6. c. 25	13 July 1944
An Act to enable the functions of the Attorney General, of the Lord Advocate and of the Attorney General for Northern Ireland to be discharged respectively by the Solicitor General, by the Solicitor General for Scotland and by deputy in certain cases.
Rural Water Supplies and Sewerage Act 1944 (repealed)	7 & 8 Geo. 6. c. 26	27 July 1944
An Act to make provision as to water supplies, sewerage and sewage disposal in rural localities, and to make expenses incurred by rural district councils in connection with water supply, sewerage and sewage disposal general expenses. (Repealed for England and Wales by Water Consolidation (Consequential Provisions) Act 1991 (c. 60) and for Scotland by Water (Scotland) Act 1946 (9 & 10 Geo. 6. c. 42) and Local Government etc. (Scotland) Act 1994 (c. 39))
Isle of Man (Customs) Act 1944 (repealed)	7 & 8 Geo. 6. c. 27	27 July 1944
An Act to amend the law with respect to customs in the Isle of Man. (Repealed by Statute Law Revision Act 1950 (14 Geo. 6. c. 6))
Agriculture (Miscellaneous Provisions) Act 1944 (repealed)	7 & 8 Geo. 6. c. 28	27 July 1944
An Act to provide for the establishment of a National Agricultural Advisory Service, and for increasing the resources of the Agricultural Mortgage Corporation and the Scottish Agricultural Securities Corporation, and otherwise to amend the law relating to agriculture and matters connected therewith. (Repealed by Statute Law (Repeals) Act 2004 (c. 14))
Food and Drugs (Milk and Dairies) Act 1944 (repealed)	7 & 8 Geo. 6. c. 29	27 July 1944
An Act to amend the provisions of the Food and Drugs Act, 1938, (Note: Food and Drugs Act 1938 (1 & 2 Geo. 6. c. 56)) relating to Milk and Dairies Regulations and other matters connected therewith. (Repealed by Statute Law (Repeals) Act 1975 (c. 10))
Appropriation Act 1944 (repealed)	7 & 8 Geo. 6. c. 30	3 August 1944
An Act to apply certain sums out of the Consolidated Fund to the service of the years ending on the thirty-first day of March, one thousand nine-hundred and forty-three and one thousand nine hundred and forty-five, and to appropriate the Supplies granted in this Session of Parliament. (Repealed by Statute Law Revision Act 1950 (14 Geo. 6. c. 6))
Education Act 1944 or the Butler Act (repealed)	7 & 8 Geo. 6. c. 31	3 August 1944
An Act to reform the law relating to education in England and Wales. (Repealed by Education Act 1996 (c. 56))
Herring Industry Act 1944 (repealed)	7 & 8 Geo. 6. c. 32	3 August 1944
An Act to authorise the giving of further financial assistance to the Herring Industry Board and to herring fishermen and persons desiring to engage in the herring industry, to amend the Herring Industry Acts, 1935 (Note: Herring Industry Act 1935 (25 & 26 Geo. 5. c. 9)) and 1938, (Note: Herring Industry Act 1938 (1 & 2 Geo. 6. c. 42)) and for purposes connected with the matters aforesaid. (Repealed by Sea Fish Industry Act 1970 (c. 11))
Housing (Temporary Provisions) Act 1944 (repealed)	7 & 8 Geo. 6. c. 33	3 August 1944
An Act to extend the making of contributions under section one of the Housing (Financial Provisions) Act, 1938, (Note: Housing (Financial Provisions) Act 1938 (1 & 2 Geo. 6. c. 16)) as respects new housing accommodation provided by local authorities before the first day of October, nineteen hundred and forty-seven; and to suspend temporarily the holding of local inquiries in respect of certain compulsory purchase orders. (Repealed by Housing (Financial Provisions) Act 1958 (6 & 7 Eliz. 2. c. 42))
Validation of War-time Leases Act 1944 (repealed)	7 & 8 Geo. 6. c. 34	3 August 1944
An Act to validate agreements purporting to grant or provide for the grant of tenancies for periods depending on the duration of the war and certain other events; to provide for the construction of such agreements and other tenancy agreements; and for purposes connected with the matters aforesaid. (Repealed by Statute Law (Repeals) Act 1976 (c. 16))
National Fire Service Regulations (Indemnity) Act 1944 (repealed)	7 & 8 Geo. 6. c. 35	3 August 1944
An Act to grant an indemnity in respect of the failure to lay before Parliament certain regulations made under the Fire Services (Emergency Provisions) Act, 1941, (Note: Fire Services (Emergency Provisions) Act 1941 (4 & 5 Geo. 6. c. 22)) as soon as may be after they were made. (Repealed by Statute Law Revision Act 1953 (2 & 3 Eliz. 2. c. 5))
Housing (Temporary Accommodation) Act 1944 (repealed)	7 & 8 Geo. 6. c. 36	10 October 1944
An Act to make provision for temporary housing accommodation, and for purposes connected therewith. (Repealed for Scotland by Housing (Financial Provisions) (Scotland) Act 1972 (c. 46) and for England and Wales by Housing Finance Act 1972 (c. 47))
Appropriation (No. 2) Act 1944 (repealed)	7 & 8 Geo. 6. c. 37	26 October 1944
An Act to apply a sum out of the Consolidated Fund to the service of the year ending on the thirty-first day of March, one thousand nine hundred and forty-five, and to appropriate the further Supplies granted in this Session of Parliament. (Repealed by Statute Law Revision Act 1950 (14 Geo. 6. c. 6))
India (Miscellaneous Provisions) Act 1944 (repealed)	7 & 8 Geo. 6. c. 38	26 October 1944
An Act to amend the Government of India Act, 1935, (Note: Government of India Act 1935 (26 Geo. 5 & 1 Edw. 8. c. 2)) in certain respects. (Repealed by Statute Law (Repeals) Act 1976 (c. 16))
Housing (Scotland) Act 1944 (repealed)	7 & 8 Geo. 6. c. 39	26 October 1944
An Act to extend the making of contributions under section one of the Housing (Financial Provisions) (Scotland) Act, 1938, (Note: Housing (Financial Provisions) (Scotland) Act 1938 (2 & 3 Geo. 6. c. 3)) as respects new housing accommodation provided by local authorities before the first day of October, nineteen hundred and forty-seven; to suspend temporarily the holding of local inquiries in respect of certain compulsory purchase orders; to provide for grants and advances to the housing association approved for the purposes of section two of the aforesaid Act; and to make provision with regard to the superannuation of the employees of the said association, and for purposes connected with the matters aforesaid. (Repealed by Housing (Scotland) Act 1950 (14 Geo. 6. c. 34))
Liabilities (War-Time Adjustment) Act 1944 (repealed)	7 & 8 Geo. 6. c. 40	26 October 1944
An Act to provide for the adjustment and settlement of debts and liabilities arising in certain areas and to amend the Liabilities (War-Time Adjustment) Act, 1941. (Note: Liabilities (War-Time Adjustment) Act 1941 (4 & 5 Geo. 6. c. 24)) (Repealed by Statute Law (Repeals) Act 1971 (c. 52))
House of Commons (Redistribution of Seats) Act 1944 (repealed)	7 & 8 Geo. 6. c. 41	26 October 1944
An Act to make temporary provision for the division of abnormally large constituencies together in certain cases with adjoining constituencies, and permanent provision for the redistribution of seats at parliamentary elections. (Repealed by House of Commons (Redistribution of Seats) Act 1949 (12, 13 & 14 Geo. 6. c. 66))
Unemployment Insurance (Increase of Benefit) Act 1944 (repealed)	7 & 8 Geo. 6. c. 42	26 October 1944
An Act to increase the rates of benefit payable under the Unemployment Insurance Acts, 1935 to 1940. (Repealed for England and Wales and Scotland by National Insurance Act 1946 (9 & 10 Geo. 6. c. 67) and for Northern Ireland by National Insurance Act (Northern Ireland) 1946 (c. 23 (N.I.)))
Matrimonial Causes (War Marriages) Act 1944 (repealed)	7 & 8 Geo. 6. c. 43	17 November 1944
An Act to confer on the High Court in England and the Court of Session in Scotland, and to provide for conferring on the High Court in Northern Ireland, temporary jurisdiction in certain matrimonial causes where the relevant marriage took place on or after the third day of September, nineteen hundred and thirty-nine, and to provide for the recognition of certain decrees and orders in matrimonial causes in all British courts. (Repealed for the United Kingdom by Family Law Act 1986 (c. 55) and for the Isle of Man by Statute Law Revision (Isle of Man) Act 1991 (c. 61))
Diplomatic Privileges (Extension) Act 1944 (repealed)	7 & 8 Geo. 6. c. 44	17 November 1944
An Act to make provision as to the immunities, privileges and capacities of international organisations of which His Majesty's Government in the United Kingdom and foreign governments are members; to confer immunities and privileges on the staffs of such organisations and representatives of member governments and in respect of premises and documents of such organisations; to remove doubts as to the extent to which representatives of foreign Powers attending international conferences and the staffs of such representatives are entitled to diplomatic immunities; to amend the Diplomatic Privileges (Extension) Act, 1941; (Note: Diplomatic Privileges (Extension) Act 1941 (4 & 5 Geo. 6. c. 7)) and for purposes connected with the matters aforesaid. (Repealed by International Organisations (Immunities and Privileges) Act 1950 (14 Geo. 6. c. 14))
Prolongation of Parliament Act 1944 (repealed)	7 & 8 Geo. 6. c. 45	17 November 1944
An Act to extend the duration of the present Parliament and to provide for the extension of the duration of the House of Commons of Northern Ireland. (Repealed by Statute Law Revision Act 1950 (14 Geo. 6. c. 6))
Ministry of National Insurance Act 1944 (repealed)	7 & 8 Geo. 6. c. 46	17 November 1944
An Act to establish a Ministry of National Insurance and for purposes connected therewith. (Repealed by Ministry of Social Security Act 1966 (c. 20))
Town and Country Planning Act 1944 (repealed)	7 & 8 Geo. 6. c. 47	17 November 1944
An Act to make provision for the acquisition and development of land for planning purposes; for amending the law relating to town and country planning; for assessing by reference to 1939 prices compensation payable in connection with the acquisition of land for public purposes, and as to the rate of interest thereon; and for purposes connected with the matters aforesaid. (Repealed by New Towns Act 1965 (c. 59))

=== Local acts ===
Short title	Citation	Royal assent
Long title
Yorkshire Registries (West Riding) Amendment Act 1944 (repealed)	7 & 8 Geo. 6. c. i	29 March 1944
An Act to amend the Yorkshire Registries Act 1884 (Note: Yorkshire Registries Act 1884 (47 & 48 Vict. c. 54)) in its application to the West Riding of the county of York. (Repealed by Registration of Title (Teesside, Leeds and Sheffield) Order 1970 (SI 1970/485))
Beckett Hospital and Dispensary, Barnsley Act 1944	7 & 8 Geo. 6. c. ii	29 March 1944
An Act to provide for the removal of the restrictions attaching to the burial ground of the church of St. Mary Barnsley in the West Riding of the county of York for the sale and vesting thereof to and in the trustees of the Beckett Hospital and Dispensary Barnsley and the use thereof for building or otherwise and for other purposes.
Jewish Colonization Association Act 1944	7 & 8 Geo. 6. c. iii	26 April 1944
An Act to extend the objects and powers of the Jewish Colonization Association and for other purposes.
City of London (Various Powers) Act 1944	7 & 8 Geo. 6. c. iv	10 May 1944
An Act to make provision with respect to the mode of transfer of stocks of the Corporation of London to apply stock regulations to all stocks of the Corporation and for other purposes.
Edinburgh Merchant Company Endowments (Amendment) Order Confirmation Act 1944	7 & 8 Geo. 6. c. v	24 May 1944
An Act to confirm a Provisional Order under the Private Legislation Procedure (Scotland) Act 1936 (Note: Private Legislation Procedure (Scotland) Act 1936 (26 Geo. 5 & 1 Edw. 8. c. 52)) relating to the Edinburgh Merchant Company Endowments.
	Edinburgh Merchant Company Endowments (Amendment) Order 1944 Provisional Order to amend the provisions of the Edinburgh Merchant Company Endowment Order 1909 in so far as relating to Part III thereof—Superannuation Fund.	
Connah's Quay Gas Act 1944	7 & 8 Geo. 6. c. vi	24 May 1944
An Act to give further powers upon the Connah's Quay Gas Company Limited and for other purposes.
Ministry of Health Provisional Order Confirmation (North Lindsey Water Board) Act 1944	7 & 8 Geo. 6. c. vii	13 July 1944
An Act to confirm a Provisional Order of the Minister of Health relating to the North Lindsey Water Board.
	North Lindsey Water Order 1944 Provisional Order altering a local Act (Note: North Lindsey Water Act 1934 (24 & 25 Geo. 5. c. xci)) and certain Orders.	
Ministry of Health Provisional Order Confirmation (Warrington) Act 1944	7 & 8 Geo. 6. c. viii	13 July 1944
An Act to confirm a Provisional Order of the Minister of Health relating to the borough of Warrington.
	Warrington Water Order 1944 Provisional Order altering a local Act. (Note: Warrington Corporation Water Act 1938 (1 & 2 Geo. 6. c. xcviii))	
North-West Midlands Joint Electricity Authority Order Confirmation Act 1944	7 & 8 Geo. 6. c. ix	13 July 1944
An Act to confirm a Provision Order made under section one of the Electricity (Supply) Act 1922 (Note: Electricity (Supply) Act 1922 (12 & 13 Geo. 5. c. 46)) relating to the North West Midlands Joint Electricity Authority.
	North West Midlands Joint Electricity Authority (Increase of Borrowing Powers) Order 1944 Provisional Order made by the Electricity Commissioners and confirmed by the Minister of Fuel and Power under the Electricity (Supply) Acts 1882 to 1936 for amending the North West Midlands Joint Electricity Authority (Increase of Borrowing Powers) Order 1939 as amended by the North West Midlands Electricity District (Meaford Generating Station) Special Order 1941.	
London and North Eastern Railway Act 1944	7 & 8 Geo. 6. c. x	13 July 1944
An Act to authorise the London and North Eastern Railway Company to establish a savings bank for their employees and others and to amalgamate therewith the existing savings banks (Note: The existing savings banks were the Great Central Railway Provident Savings Bank, the Great Eastern Railway Provident Savings Bank, the Great Northern Railway Savings Bank, the North Eastern Railway Bank of Deposits, the North British Railway Savings Bank, and the Great North of Scotland Railway Savings Bank.) maintained by the Company and for other purposes.
London County Council (Money) Act 1944 (repealed)	7 & 8 Geo. 6. c. xi	13 July 1944
An Act to regulate the expenditure on capital account and lending of money by the London County Council during the financial period from the first day of April one thousand nine hundred and forty-four to the thirtieth day of September one thousand nine hundred and forty-five and for other purposes. (Repealed by London County Council (Loans) Act 1955 (4 & 5 Eliz. 2. c. xxvi))
Herts and Essex Water Act 1944	7 & 8 Geo. 6. c. xii	13 July 1944
An Act to confirm the construction by the Herts and Essex Waterworks Company Limited of certain existing waterworks to empower the Company to construct a new waterwork and raise additional money to alter and redefine the limits of supply of the Company and for other purposes.
Gillingham Corporation Act 1944 (repealed)	7 & 8 Geo. 6. c. xiii	27 July 1944
An Act to make further provision in reference to the undertakings and funds of the mayor aldermen and burgesses of the borough of Gillingham and with respect to their income and expenditure and for other purposes. (Repealed by County of Kent Act 1981 (c. xviii))
Ascot District Gas and Electricity Act 1944	7 & 8 Geo. 6. c. xiv	27 July 1944
An Act to authorise the Ascot District Gas and Electricity Company to acquire certain lands compulsorily and for other purposes.
Wisbech Corporation Act 1944	7 & 8 Geo. 6. c. xv	27 July 1944
An Act to provide for the vesting of part of the Wisbech Canal in the mayor aldermen and burgesses of the borough of Wisbech and to enable them to pipe the water of part thereof and fill the same and lay out other part thereof as a pleasure ground to confer upon the Corporation powers of control over so much of the remainder of said canal as is in or adjoining the borough to authorise the compulsory purchase of lands by the Corporation to make further provision with regard to the health local government and improvement of the borough and for other purposes.
Loughborough Corporation Act 1944	7 & 8 Geo. 6. c. xvi	27 July 1944
An Act to authorise the mayor aldermen and burgesses of the borough of Loughborough to construct additional waterworks and to confer further powers in regard to their water undertaking to make further and better provision for the finances and the good government of the borough and for other purposes.
Ministry of Health Provisional Order Confirmation (Workington) Act 1944	7 & 8 Geo. 6. c. xvii	3 August 1944
An Act to confirm a Provisional Order of the Minister of Health relating to the borough of Workington.
	Workington Order 1944 Provisional Order altering a local act. (Note: Workington Corporation Act 1899 (62 & 63 Vict. c. cclx))	
Derwent Valley Water Act 1944	7 & 8 Geo. 6. c. xviii	3 August 1944
An Act to authorise the Derwent Valley Water Board to construct new waterworks and to acquire lands to make provision for the protection of the gathering ground of the new waterworks to confer further powers upon the Board and for other purposes.
Chesterfield and Bolsover Water Act 1944	7 & 8 Geo. 6. c. xix	3 August 1944
An Act to empower the Chesterfield and Bolsover Water Board to construct additional works to confer further powers upon the Board for the purposes of their undertaking and for other purposes.
Anglesey County Council (Water, &c.) Act 1944	7 & 8 Geo. 6. c. xx	3 August 1944
An Act to provide for the vesting in the county council of the administrative county of Anglesey of the existing water undertakings in the county to empower the said county council to construct waterworks and supply water throughout the county and for other purposes.
Middlesex County Council Act 1944	7 & 8 Geo. 6. c. xxi	3 August 1944
An Act to consolidate with amendments numerous enactments in force in the county of Middlesex and enactments relating to that county jointly with adjoining counties to make provision for the local government and improvement of the county of Middlesex and to confer powers upon the Council of and the local authorities within that county.

== 8 & 9 Geo. 6 ==
The tenth session of the 37th Parliament of the United Kingdom, which met from 29 November 1944 until 15 June 1945.

This session was also traditionally cited as 8 & 9 G. 6.

=== Public general acts ===
Short title	Citation	Royal assent
Long title
Consolidated Fund (No. 1) Act 1944 (Session 2) (repealed)	8 & 9 Geo. 6. c. 1	21 December 1944
An Act to apply a sum out of the Consolidated Fund to the service of the year ending on the thirty-first day of March, one thousand nine hundred and forty-five. (Repealed by Statute Law Revision Act 1950 (14 Geo. 6. c. 6))
Expiring Laws Continuance Act 1944 (repealed)	8 & 9 Geo. 6. c. 2	21 December 1944
An Act to continue certain expiring laws. (Repealed by Statute Law Revision Act 1950 (14 Geo. 6. c. 6))
Local Elections and Register of Electors (Temporary Provisions) Act 1944 (repealed)	8 & 9 Geo. 6. c. 3	21 December 1944
An Act to continue in force the Local Elections and Register of Electors (Temporary Provisions) Act, 1939. (Note: Local Elections and Register of Electors (Temporary Provisions) Act 1939 (2 & 3 Geo. 6. c. 115)) (Repealed for England and Wales and Scotland by Representation of the People Act 1945 (8 & 9 Geo. 6. c. 5) and for Northern Ireland by Statute Law Revision Act (Northern Ireland) 1954 (c. 35 (N.I.)))

=== Local acts ===
Short title	Citation	Royal assent
Long title
London Midland and Scottish Railway Act 1944	8 & 9 Geo. 6. c. i	21 December 1944
An Act to authorise the supply of water from the Shropshire Union Canal and for other purposes.
London Midland and Scottish Railway (Canals) Act 1944	8 & 9 Geo. 6. c. ii	21 December 1944
An Act to authorise the closing for navigation of canals to provide for the transfer of part of the Huddersfield Canals to the Company of Proprietors of the Calder and Hebble Navigation and for other purposes.

=== Sources ===
- Public General Acts and the Church Assembly Measures of 1944. 1944.

== See also ==
- List of acts of the Parliament of the United Kingdom
