= Parliament (Elections and Meeting) Act 1943 =

Act of the Parliament of the United Kingdom

Parliament (Elections and Meeting) Act 1943 (Note: Section 35.)
- Act of Parliament
- Parliament of the United Kingdom
- Long title: An Act to make temporary provision as respects parliamentary elections and the registration of parliamentary electors and, in connection therewith, as respects the dissolution of parliament as from a future date and other matters; to consolidate and amend the law as to the officers to whom writs for parliamentary elections are to be directed, and the persons to whom and the manner in which they are to be conveyed; and to shorten the time required for summoning parliament when prorogued.
- Citation: 6 & 7 Geo. 6. c. 48
- Territorial extent: United Kingdom

Dates
- Royal assent: 11 November 1943
- Commencement: 11 November 1943 (Note: The Acts of Parliament (Commencement) Act 1793.)

Other legislation
- Amends: Ballot Act 1872; Representation of the People Act 1918; Representation of the People (No. 2) Act 1920; See § Repealed enactments
- Repeals/revokes: See § Repealed enactments
- Amended by: Representation of the People Act 1945; Representation of the People Act 1948; Representation of the People Act 1949; Statute Law Revision Act 1950

Status: Partially repealed

Text of statute as originally enacted

Revised text of statute as amended

Text of the Parliament (Elections and Meeting) Act 1943 as in force today (including any amendments) within the United Kingdom, from legislation.gov.uk.

The Parliament (Elections and Meeting) Act 1943 (6 & 7 Geo. 6. c. 48) is an act of the Parliament of the United Kingdom that made temporary wartime provision for parliamentary elections and the registration of parliamentary electors in the United Kingdom, consolidated and amended the law relating to the delivery of writs for parliamentary elections, and shortened the time required for summoning parliament when prorogued.

As of 2026, section 34 of the act remains in force in the United Kingdom.

== Provisions ==
=== Repealed enactments ===
The act repealed 11 enactments, listed in Parts I and II of the seventh schedule to the act.

Part I - enactments as from the commencement of the act
Citation	Short title	Description	Extent of repeal
7 & 8 Will. 3. c. 25	Parliamentary Elections Act 1695	An Act for the further regulating Elections of Members to serve in Parliament and for the preventing irregular Proceedings of Sheriffs and other Officers in the electing and returning such Members.	In section one, the words from "And that as well" to the end of the section.
6 Anne. c. 40	Union with Scotland (Amendment) Act 1707	The Union with Scotland (Amendment) Act, 1707.	In section five, the words "directed to the several sheriffs and stewarts of the respective shires and stewartries".
60 Geo. 3 & 1 Geo. 4. c. 11	Parliamentary Elections (Ireland) Act 1820	The Parliamentary Elections (Ireland) Act, 1820.	Section five.
4 Geo. 4. c. 55	Parliamentary Elections (Ireland) Act 1823	The Parliamentary Elections (Ireland) Act, 1823.	Section thirty-three.
16 & 17 Vict. c. 68	Parliamentary Elections Act 1853	The Parliamentary Elections Act, 1853.	In section one, the words from "the writ for making" to "places respectively".
17 & 18 Vict. c. 57	Returning Officers Act 1854	The Returning Officers Act, 1854.	The whole act.
25 & 26 Vict. c. 92	Elections (Ireland) Act 1862	The Elections (Ireland) Act, 1862.	The whole act.
7 & 8 Geo. 5. c. 64	Representation of the People Act 1918	The Representation of the People Act, 1918.	In the Fifth Schedule, in Part I, paragraph 1, the words from "and the writ" to end of paragraph; and in Part II, paragraph 1, the words from "to whom" to end of paragraph.

Part II - enactments repealed as from the coming into operation of the Order in Council first made as respects Great Britain under section 29 of the act
Citation	Short title	Extent of repeal
53 Geo. 3. c. 89	Parliamentary Writs Act 1813	The whole act.
37 & 38 Vict. c. 81	Great Seal (Offices) Act 1874	In section four, the words from "The powers and duties" to "in writing", and the word "other".
23 & 24 Geo. 5. c. 36	Administration of Justice (Miscellaneous Provisions) Act 1933	In the First Schedule, the entry relating to the Parliamentary Writs Act 1813.

== Subsequent developments ==
The wartime registration provisions in sections 1 to 25 of the act, together with the first, second, fourth and sixth schedules to it, were repealed by the thirteenth schedule to the Representation of the People Act 1948 (11 & 12 Geo. 6. c. 65). Sections 26 to 33 of the act, relating to parliamentary writs, together with the fifth schedule to it, were repealed by the ninth schedule to the Representation of the People Act 1949 (12, 13 & 14 Geo. 6. c. 68). The seventh schedule to the act was repealed by the Statute Law Revision Act 1950.

Section 34 of the act, which amended the Meeting of Parliament Act 1797 (37 Geo. 3. c. 127) to permit parliament to be summoned on any day after the date of a prorogation proclamation, remains in force.
