= Boundary commissions (United Kingdom) =

UK Parliament constituency boundary body

In the United Kingdom, the boundary commissions are non-departmental public bodies responsible for determining the boundaries of parliamentary constituencies for elections to the House of Commons. There are four boundary commissions: one each for England, Scotland, Wales and Northern Ireland.

Each commission comprises four members, three of whom take part in meetings. The speaker of the House of Commons chairs each of the boundary commissions ex officio but does not play any part in the review, and a High Court judge is appointed to each boundary commission as deputy chair.

== Considerations and process ==
The boundary commissions, which are required to report every eight years, must apply a set series of rules when devising constituencies. These rules are set out in the Parliamentary Constituencies Act 1986, as amended by the Parliamentary Voting System and Constituencies Act 2011 and subsequently by the Parliamentary Constituencies Act 2020.

Firstly, each proposed constituency has to comply with two numerical limits:

- the electorate (number of registered voters) of each constituency must be within 5% of the United Kingdom electoral quota. The electoral quota is the average number of electors per constituency, defined as the total mainland electorate divided by the number of mainland constituencies, where "mainland" excludes five island constituencies: Orkney and Shetland, Na h-Eileanan an Iar (Western Isles), Ynys Môn (Isle of Anglesey) and two on the Isle of Wight. The total number of constituencies is fixed at 650.
- the area of a constituency must be no more than 13,000 square kilometres (5,020 sq mi).

There are a small number of exceptions to the numerical limit on electorate which are specified in the legislation:

- the five island constituencies are permitted to have a smaller electorate than the usual limit;
- a constituency with an area of more than 12,000 square kilometres (4,630 sq mi) may have a smaller electorate than the usual limit; and
- constituencies in Northern Ireland may be subject to slightly different limits under certain circumstances.

Having satisfied the electorate and area requirements, each commission can also take into account a number of other factors:

- "special geographical considerations" including the size, shape and accessibility of a constituency;
- local government boundaries;
- boundaries of existing constituencies;
- local ties which would be broken by changes to constituencies;
- inconveniences resulting from changes to constituencies.

As these factors can to an extent be mutually conflicting, each commission has discretion on how it applies them. In so doing, each commission aims for a consistent approach within a review.

When a commission publishes its proposals for public consultation, the consultation periods are specified in the legislation:

- an eight-week initial written consultation period following the publication of Initial Proposals;
- a six-week secondary consultation period allowing scrutiny of all comments submitted during the initial consultation and including a number of public hearings which offer an opportunity to give views orally;
- a four-week consultation period following publication of Revised Proposals.

It has been normal practice for local government electoral wards to be used as building blocks for constituencies, although there is no legislative requirement to do so. In some metropolitan boroughs in England, and in Scotland, following the introduction of multi-member wards in 2007, it is often difficult to do so due to the large electorates in these wards, and therefore a collection of complete wards may not give an electorate that is within the required electoral range.

The law specifies that the electorate used during a review is the registered electorate at the time of the start of the review, and not the electorate at the end of a review, or the total population.

Boundary changes can have a significant effect on the results of elections, but boundary commissions do not take any account of voting patterns in their deliberations, or consider what the effect of their recommendations on the outcome of an election may be.

=== Implementation of recommendations ===
Once a commission has completed its review, it submits a report to the appropriate Secretary of State who lays it before Parliament. Once all four reports have been submitted, an Order in Council which gives effect to the recommendations must be submitted within four months to the Privy Council. The Government may not modify any of the commissions' recommendations unless specifically requested to do so by the relevant commission. On approval by the Privy Council, the new constituencies come into effect for the next general election. Any by-elections before then use the pre-existing boundaries.

These provisions were brought in by the Parliamentary Constituencies Act 2020. Previously, Parliament voted on the recommendations and, although it could not make any alterations to them, it could reject them in their entirety. In addition, although this power was never exercised, for many years the legislation gave the Secretary of State the power to modify a commission's recommendations. The new procedures further strengthen the separation of the creation of constituency boundaries from those elected for the resulting electoral areas, with the aim of eliminating any scope for gerrymandering.

== History ==
=== Legislation ===
The commissions are currently established under the Parliamentary Constituencies Act 1986, most recently amended by the Parliamentary Voting System and Constituencies Act 2011. They were first established as permanent bodies under the House of Commons (Redistribution of Seats) Act 1944. The 1944 Act was amended in 1947 and then replaced by the House of Commons (Redistribution of Seats) Act 1949. The 1949 Act was amended in 1958 and 1979 and replaced by the Parliamentary Constituencies Act 1986; changes in legislation from 1944 to 1986 were generally incremental in nature.

The Political Parties, Elections and Referendums Act 2000 under PM Tony Blair's government envisaged that the functions of the boundary commissioners would be transferred to the United Kingdom Electoral Commission, but this never transpired: the Local Democracy, Economic Development and Construction Act 2009 repealed the Act of Parliament (of 2000) effective from 1 April 2010.

The Parliamentary Voting System and Constituencies Act 2011 passed under the Con-Lib Dem coalition government made substantial changes to the legislation governing constituency boundary reviews; this was further amended by the Parliamentary Constituencies Act 2020.

=== Past reviews of UK Parliament constituencies ===
Customarily, each commission conducted a complete review of all constituencies in its part of the United Kingdom every eight to twelve years. In between these general reviews, the commissions were able to conduct interim reviews of part of their area of responsibility. The interim reviews usually did not yield drastic changes in boundaries, while the general reviews generally did.

Under the rules in force before 2011, the number of constituencies in Great Britain (England, Wales, and Scotland) had to "not be substantially greater or less than 613", of which at least 35 had to be in Wales. The City of London was not to be partitioned and was to be included in a seat that referred to it by name. The Orkney and Shetland Islands were not to be combined with any other areas. Northern Ireland had to have between 16 and 18 constituencies.

Under the Parliamentary Constituencies Act 1986, the terms of review were significantly different:

- the total number of constituencies was not fixed (see above): each commission had limited discretion to specify the number in its part of the United Kingdom;
- the size of the electorates was just one of several rules, rather than being subject to a numerical limit which overrides other factors;
- there was not previously a limit on the area of a constituency, but in practice, no constituency has ever exceeded the 13,000 square kilometre limit introduced by the 2011 Act;
- the consultation mechanism was significantly different: consultation periods only lasted four weeks, and could be followed by local inquiries;
- reviews were only carried out every eight to twelve years instead of every five years.

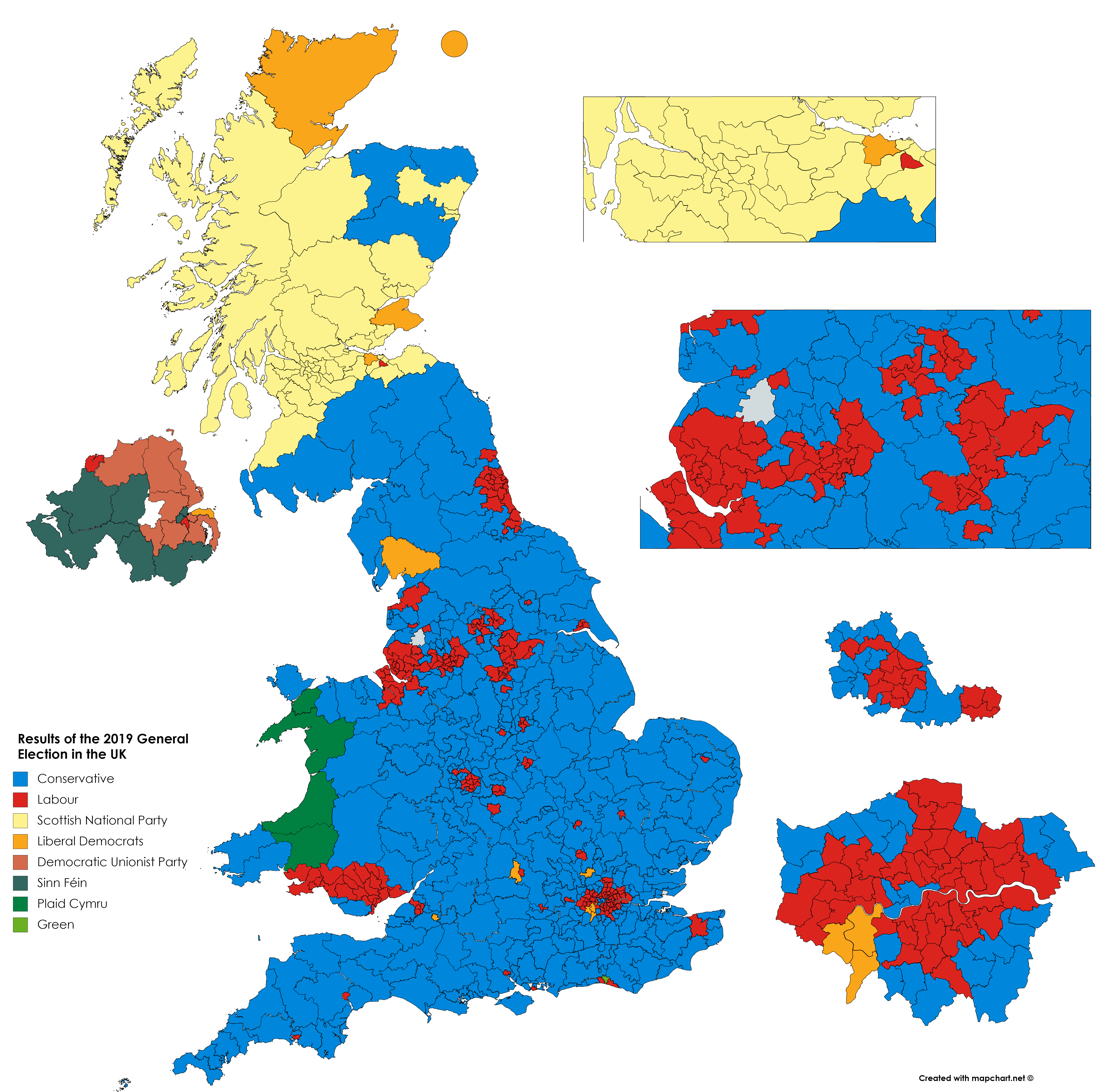
The former constituencies showing the results of the 2019 general election.

The constituency boundaries used for the elections between 2010 and 2019 were mostly established by the Fifth Periodic Review, which was given effect in Wales by an Order made in 2006, in England by an Order from 2007 and in Northern Ireland by an Order from 2008, with the new boundaries used for the May 2010 general election. The Scottish boundaries used in those elections were given effect in 2005, and were already used in the May 2005 general election.

Under the Fifth Periodic Review, there were 533 constituencies in England, 40 constituencies in Wales, 59 constituencies in Scotland and 18 constituencies in Northern Ireland, providing a total of 650.

==== Sixth Periodic Review ====
The Sixth Periodic Review of Westminster constituencies was launched on 4 March 2011 by the Boundary Commission for England, the Boundary Commission for Scotland, the Boundary Commission for Wales and the Boundary Commission for Northern Ireland. The Sixth Review would have resulted in 600 constituencies for the United Kingdom Parliament: a reduction from the 650 constituencies in existence at the 2010 general election. In January 2013, parliamentary opposition to proposed legislative amendments because of a lack of consensus in the coalition resulted in the review being suspended.

Following the Conservative victory at the 2015 general election, the review was recommenced in 2016 and final recommendations were submitted by the four commissions in September 2018 and laid before Parliament. However the revised proposals were never brought forward by the Government for approval and, further to the passing of the Parliamentary Constituencies Act 2020, the Sixth Review was formally abandoned.

=== 2023 review ===
The current constituencies used in the 2024 general election, labelled.

Following the passing of the 2020 Act, which reinstated the number of constituencies to 650, a new review, known as the 2023 Review, was launched by the four commissions on 5 January 2021. Under the new rules governing the number of constituencies in each nation, England would have 543 constituencies (+10), Wales 32 (-8), Scotland 57 (-2) and Northern Ireland 18 (unchanged).

The final consultation for England began on 8 November 2022 with the publication of the Revised Proposals and lasted for four weeks, ending on 5 December.

All four Commissions submitted their Final Recommendations Reports to the Speaker of the House of Commons on 27 June 2023. An order in council adopting the recommendations, The Parliamentary Constituencies Order 2023 (No. 1230 of 2023), was made on 15 November 2023 and came into force on 29 November 2023.

== Relationship with local government, devolved legislatures and the European Parliament ==
The scope of the boundary commissions' work is limited to areas for election to the UK House of Commons.

Local authority areas and electoral areas are reviewed by the separate:

- Local Government Boundary Commission for England
- Boundaries Scotland
- Local Government Boundaries Commissioner for Northern Ireland
- Democracy and Boundary Commission Cymru (Wales)

Changes to parliamentary boundaries do not themselves impact on which local councils are responsible for any area.

=== House of Commons of Northern Ireland ===
The Electoral Law Act (Northern Ireland) 1968 established a boundary commission for the House of Commons of Northern Ireland. The Parliament of Northern Ireland was abolished before any of its boundary reviews were implemented.

=== Scottish Parliament ===
The procedure for reviews of constituencies and regions for the Scottish Parliament is set down by the Scotland Act 1998. That Act specifies that there are 73 constituencies for the Scottish Parliament: Na h-Eileanan an Iar, the Orkney Islands, the Shetland Islands and 70 others. The Act also specifies that the constituencies are grouped into eight regions to allow the return of list members elected by proportional representation to the parliament. The Boundary Commission for Scotland conducted a review of these boundaries between 2007 and 2010, and their recommendations were implemented from 2011. Since the legislation requires different numbers of constituencies in Scotland for the United Kingdom Parliament and the Scottish Parliament, these two sets of areas do not fit together neatly. Responsibility for Scottish Parliament boundary reviews passed to the Local Government Boundary Commission for Scotland in May 2017.

=== Senedd ===
The Government of Wales Act 2006 specified that the constituencies for the then National Assembly for Wales were to be the same as those for the UK Parliament at Westminster. The act required the Boundary Commission for Wales to group the constituencies into electoral regions, to allow the return of list members elected by proportional representation to the Assembly. The Boundary Commission for Wales's Fifth General Review resulted in revised Assembly constituencies and electoral regions. The Parliamentary Voting System and Constituencies Act 2011 removed the link with Westminster constituencies, and the Senedd Cymru (Members and Elections) Act 2024 made the Democracy and Boundary Commission Cymru the statutory review body for Senedd boundaries.

The Boundary Commission reported in 2016 proposing to reduce the number of UK Parliament constituencies in Wales to 29, on the basis that all constituencies must have at least 71,031 voters. While the Parliamentary Voting System and Constituencies Act 2011 removed the link between UK Parliament and Senedd seat boundaries, organisations such as the Electoral Reform Society have indicated a preference for coterminosity (meaning the mirroring of seat boundaries in Wales along the lines of the 2016 proposed reforms to the Welsh seats in the UK Parliament).

=== Northern Ireland Assembly ===
Section 33 of the Northern Ireland Act 1998 provides that the constituencies for the Northern Ireland Assembly are the same as the constituencies that are used for the United Kingdom Parliament. From 1998 to 2016 six members were elected from each constituency; the Assembly Members (Reduction of Numbers) Act (Northern Ireland) 2016 reduced this to five members.

=== European Parliament ===
The European Parliament (Representation) Act 2003 enabled the Electoral Commission to make recommendations for how many seats each European Parliament constituency should have, and make a recommendation for which European Parliament constituency in England and Wales Gibraltar should be contained inside.

== See also ==
- Constituencies of the Parliament of the United Kingdom
- 2023 review of Westminster constituencies
- Delimitation Commission of India
- Electoral Affairs Commission of Hong Kong
- Irish Boundary Commission which proposed adjustments to the border between the (then) Irish Free State and Northern Ireland in 1925
- Redistricting in the United States
