= Election Commissioners Act 1949 =

Act of the Parliament of the United Kingdom

Election Commissioners Act 1949 (Note: Section 22(1).)
- Act of Parliament
- Parliament of the United Kingdom
- Long title: An Act to consolidate certain enactments relating to election commissioners.
- Citation: 12, 13 & 14 Geo. 6. c. 90
- Territorial extent: United Kingdom

Dates
- Royal assent: 16 December 1949
- Commencement: 23 February 1950 (Note: Section 22(2); being the date of the 1950 United Kingdom general election, the first general election after the passing of the act.)
- Repealed: 12 May 1969
Other legislation
Amends	See § Repealed enactments
Repeals/revokes	See § Repealed enactments
Amended by	Statute Law Revision Act 1953; Statute Law Revision Act 1963; Law Reform (Miscellaneous Provisions) (Scotland) Act 1966
Repealed by	Representation of the People Act 1969
Relates to	Representation of the People Act 1949

Status: Repealed

Text of statute as originally enacted

Law Reform (Miscellaneous Provisions) (Scotland) Act 1966

The Election Commissioners Act 1949 (12, 13 & 14 Geo. 6. c. 90) was an act of the Parliament of the United Kingdom that consolidated enactments relating to election commissioners.

== Provisions ==
=== Repealed enactments ===
Section 21(1) of the act repealed 7 enactments, listed in the schedule to the act.

Citation	Short title	Extent of repeal
15 & 16 Vict. c. 57	Election Commissioners Act 1852	The whole act.
31 & 32 Vict. c. 125	Parliamentary Elections Act 1868	Sections three, fifteen and fifty-six.
32 & 33 Vict. c. 21	Corrupt Practices Commission Expenses Act 1869	The whole act.
46 & 47 Vict. c. 51	Corrupt and Illegal Practices Prevention Act 1883	The whole act except section forty-two.
12 & 13 Geo. 5. c. 50	Expiring Laws Act 1922	In Part I of the First Schedule, the provision relating to the Corrupt Practices Commission Expenses Act 1869.
11 & 12 Geo. 6. c. 65	Representation of the People Act 1948	In section fifty-two, subsection (5). In section fifty-three, subsection (3). Section fifty-four. In the Tenth Schedule, in Part I, paragraph 5; and in Part II, paragraph 5.
12, 13 & 14 Geo. 6. c. 68	Representation of the People Act 1949	In the Eighth Schedule, sub-paragraph (2) of paragraph 1; in paragraph 3, the proviso; paragraph 4; and in paragraph 5, so much of sub-paragraph (1) as relates to paragraph 5 of Part II of the Tenth Schedule to the Representation of the People Act 1948.

== Subsequent developments ==
The whole act was repealed by section 24(1) of, and Part I of Schedule 3 to, the Representation of the People Act 1969 (1969 c. 15), which came into force on 12 May 1969.
