= Representation of the People Act 1949 =

Act of the Parliament of the United Kingdom

Representation of the People Act 1949 (Note: Section 176(1).)
- Act of Parliament
- Parliament of the United Kingdom
- Long title: An Act to consolidate certain enactments relating to parliamentary and local government elections, corrupt and illegal practices and election petitions.
- Citation: 12, 13 & 14 Geo. 6. c. 68
- Territorial extent: United Kingdom

Dates
- Royal assent: 24 November 1949
- Commencement: 24 November 1949: relating to parliamentary elections, other than registration; 11 March 1750: relating to local government elections, other than registration.; 3 April 1950: rest of act except section 176(2).; (Note: The Representation of the People Act 1949 (Date of Commencement) Order 1950 (SI 1950/242).)
- Repealed: 15 March 1983 (Note: The The Representation of the People Act 1983 (Commencement) Order 1983 (SI 1983/153).)
Other legislation
Amends	See § Repealed enactments
Repeals/revokes	See § Repealed enactments
Amended by	Election Commissioners Act 1949; Magistrates' Courts Act 1952; Statute Law Revision Act 1953; Representation of the People (Amendment) Act 1958; Statute Law Revision Act 1963; Police Act 1964; Law Reform (Miscellaneous Provisions) (Scotland) Act 1966; Criminal Law Act 1967; Police (Scotland) Act 1967; Representation of the People Act 1969; Courts Act 1971; Statute Law (Repeals) Act 1976; Judicature (Northern Ireland) Act 1978; Representation of the People Act 1981; Armed Forces Act 1981
Repealed by	Representation of the People Act 1983
Relates to	House of Commons (Redistribution of Seats) Act 1949

Status: Repealed

Text of statute as originally enacted

Representation of the People (Amendment) Act 1958 (Note: Section 2(1).)
- Act of Parliament
- Parliament of the United Kingdom
- Long title: An Act to repeal section eighty-eight of the Representation of the People Act, 1949.
- Citation: 7 & 8 Eliz. 2. c. 9
- Territorial extent: United Kingdom

Dates
- Royal assent: 18 December 1958
- Commencement: 18 December 1958 (Note: The Acts of Parliament (Commencement) Act 1793.)
- Repealed: 12 May 1969
Other legislation
Amends	Representation of the People Act 1949
Repealed by	Representation of the People Act 1969

Status: Repealed

Text of statute as originally enacted

The Representation of the People Act 1949 (12, 13 & 14 Geo. 6. c. 68) was an act of the Parliament of the United Kingdom. The act consolidated previous electoral law, but also made some changes to administration. Representation of the People amendments followed in 1969, 1977, 1978, and 1980, all being repealed through consolidation into the Representation of the People Act 1983.

The principal change was to provide for the conduct of future reviews of parliamentary boundaries by the permanent Parliamentary Boundary Commissions. The act also abolished the terms 'parliamentary borough' and 'parliamentary county', renaming them 'borough constituency' and 'county constituency', abolished the university constituencies, and removed a requirement that the City of London form its own constituency. The Boundary Commissions were instructed to review all boundaries within 3–7 years from the act coming into force, and thereafter to review the boundaries periodically.

In addition the act made some changes to the franchise, removing the remaining provisions allowing plural voting in parliamentary elections by people who owned business premises. (However, plural voting for local government elections continued until it was abolished, outside the City of London, by the Representation of the People Act 1969. It still exists in the City of London – see City of London Corporation elections). From this point forward, there was a single electoral register for both local government and Parliamentary elections and each voter was only allowed to vote once in any general election even if they happened to be registered in more than one address for local elections.

== Provisions ==
=== Repealed enactments ===
Section 175(1) of the act repealed 54 enactments, listed in the ninth schedule to the act.

Citation	Short title	Description	Extent of repeal
7 & 8 Will. 3. c. 7	Parliamentary Elections (Returns) Act 1695	The Parliamentary Elections (Returns) Act, 1695.	The whole act.
6 Anne. c. 40	Union with Scotland (Amendment) Act 1707	The Union with Scotland (Amendment) Act, 1707.	Section five.
39 & 40 Geo. 3. c. 67	Union with Ireland Act 1800	The Union with Ireland Act, 1800.	In section two, the words from "and such writs and the returns" to "shall be lost".
2 & 3 Will. 4. c. 65	Representation of the People (Scotland) Act 1832	The Representation of the People (Scotland) Act, 1832.	In section thirty-six, the words from "and no sheriff clerk" to the end of the section.
2 & 3 Will. 4. c. 69	Corporate Property (Elections) Act 1832	The Corporate Property (Elections) Act, 1832.	The whole act.
3 & 4 Vict. c. 108	Municipal Corporations (Ireland) Act 1840	The Municipal Corporations (Ireland) Act, 1840.	In section eighty-four, the words from "and in boroughs" to the end of the section.
6 & 7 Vict. c. 18	Parliamentary Voters Registration Act 1843	The Parliamentary Voters Registration Act, 1843.	The whole act.
13 & 14 Vict. c. 69	Representation of the People (Ireland) Act 1850	The Representation of the People (Ireland) Act, 1850.	The whole act.
17 & 18 Vict. c. 102	Corrupt Practices Prevention Act 1854	The Corrupt Practices Prevention Act, 1854.	The whole act.
22 & 23 Vict. c. 32	County and Borough Police Act 1859	The County and Borough Police Act, 1859.	Section three.
26 & 27 Vict. c. 29	Corrupt Practices Prevention Act 1863	The Corrupt Practices Prevention Act, 1863.	The whole act.
30 & 31 Vict. c. 102	Representation of the People Act 1867	The Representation of the People Act, 1867.	The whole act except sections seven and fifty-one.
31 & 32 Vict. c. 48	Representation of the People (Scotland) Act 1868	The Representation of the People (Scotland) Act, 1868.	Section twenty-three.
31 & 32 Vict. c. 49	Representation of the People (Ireland) Act 1868	The Representation of the People (Ireland) Act, 1868.	The whole act.
31 & 32 Vict. c. 125	Parliamentary Elections Act 1868	The Parliamentary Elections Act, 1868.	Section two. In section three, the definitions except that of corrupt practices. Sections four to ten. In section eleven, paragraph (1), paragraph (6), in paragraph (7) the words "under this Act", and paragraphs (9) to (16). Sections twelve to fourteen. In section fifteen, the words "under this Act". Sections seventeen to fifty-three. Section fifty-seven. In section fifty-eight, paragraphs (1), (4), (5) and (10), in paragraph (11) the words "under this Act", and paragraphs (12) to (18).
35 & 36 Vict. c. 33	Ballot Act 1872	The Ballot Act, 1872.	The whole act.
42 & 43 Vict. c. 75	Parliamentary Elections and Corrupt Practices Act 1879	The Parliamentary Elections and Corrupt Practices Act, 1879.	Section two save as it affects the number of judges to be placed on the rota.
45 & 46 Vict. c. 50	Municipal Corporations Act 1882	The Municipal Corporations Act, 1882.	In section seven, the definition of "municipal election". Part IV. Section one hundred and twenty-four. In the Fifth Schedule, in Part II, paragraph 2. In the Ninth Schedule, the references to the Representation of the People Act, 1867, the Boundary Act, 1868, the Parliamentary Electors Registration Act, 1868, and the Parliamentary Elections Act, 1868.
46 & 47 Vict. c. 18	Municipal Corporations Act 1883	The Municipal Corporations Act, 1883.	In section six, in subsection (1) the words from "whether" to "or otherwise" and subsection (2).
46 & 47 Vict. c. 51	Corrupt and Illegal Practices Prevention Act 1883	The Corrupt and Illegal Practices Prevention Act, 1883.	Sections one to eleven. In section twelve, the words from "and the expression" to the end of the section. Sections thirteen to thirty-seven. In section thirty-eight, in subsection (1), the words from the beginning of the subsection to "an election court and", the words "court or" and the words "as the case may be", in subsections (5) to (7) the words "any election court or" whenever they occur, in subsection (8), paragraph (a), in paragraph (b) the words "an election court or" and the words "court or", and in paragraph (c) the words "conviction of or", and subsection (10). Sections thirty-nine to forty-one. In section forty-two, the words from the beginning of the section to "conclusion and". Sections forty-three to forty-five. In section forty-six, the words "either before or after the commencement of this Act", the words "the Corrupt Practices Prevention Acts or", the words "a conviction or of", the words "any election court or", and the words "conviction or" in the two further places where they occur. Section forty-eight. Sections fifty to fifty-five. In section fifty-six, in subsection (1) the words from "may so far" to "other respects" and the proviso, and in subsection (2) the words "and of the Parliamentary Elections Act, 1868, and the Acts amending the same". In section fifty-seven, subsection (2). Section fifty-eight. In section fifty-nine, subsections (1) to (3) except in so far as they are applied by subsection (4) to witnesses before election commissioners. In section sixty, the words "An election court or" and "in the case of the commissioners". In section sixty-two, subsections (1) and (3), and in subsection (2) the words "the High Court or any election court or", the words "or otherwise", the words "making a statement or", and the words "court or" in every other place where they occur. Section sixty-three. In section sixty-four, the words from "Other expressions" to the end of the section and the definitions except those of "election", "election petition", "election court", "Election Commissioners", "the Attorney General", "person" and "Licensing Acts". In section sixty-five, subsections (1) and (4). Section sixty-six. In section sixty-eight, in paragraph (1) the definitions except those of "barrister" and "quarter sessions", and paragraphs (2), (3), (6), (10), (11), (15), and (17). In section sixty-nine, paragraphs (1), (10), (12) and (13). The First, Second and Third Schedules.
47 & 48 Vict. c. 70	Municipal Elections (Corrupt and Illegal Practices) Act 1884	The Municipal Elections (Corrupt and Illegal Practices) Act, 1884.	The whole act except paragraphs (5) and (7) of section thirty-five; in paragraph (7) of section thirty-five the words from "a sum" to "fifty pounds and", and the words from "unless" to "fourth day".
48 & 49 Vict. c. 56	Parliamentary Elections Corrupt Practices Act 1885	The Parliamentary Elections Corrupt Practices Act, 1885.	The whole act.
51 & 52 Vict. c. 27	Supreme Court of Judicature (Ireland) Amendment Act 1888	The Supreme Court of Judicature (Ireland) Amendment Act, 1888.	In section two, in subsection (1) the words "In all cases of appeal to", the words "under the Registration of Voters Acts and", the word "other" and the words "that Court."
51 & 52 Vict. c. 41	Local Government Act 1888	The Local Government Act, 1888.	Section seventy-five. In section ninety-two, subsection (2).
53 & 54 Vict. c. 55	Elections (Scotland) (Corrupt and Illegal Practices) Act 1890	The Elections (Scotland) (Corrupt and Illegal Practices) Act, 1890.	The whole act.
53 & 54 Vict. c. clxxvi	Local Government Board's Provisional Order Confirmation (No. 6) Act 1890	The Local Government Board's Provisional Order Confirmation (No. 6) Act, 1890.	In the Schedule, so much of Article seven as relates to section seventy-five of the Local Government Act, 1888.
54 & 55 Vict. c. 49	Returning Officers (Scotland) Act 1891	The Returning Officers (Scotland) Act, 1891.	The whole act.
58 & 59 Vict. c. 40	Corrupt and Illegal Practices Prevention Act 1895	The Corrupt and Illegal Practices Prevention Act, 1895.	The whole act.
61 & 62 Vict. c. 37	Local Government (Ireland) Act 1898	The Local Government (Ireland) Act, 1898.	In section ninety-nine, in subsection (1) the words from "and may be used" to the end and subsection (2).
7 Edw. 7. c. 51	Sheriff Courts (Scotland) Act 1907	The Sheriff Courts (Scotland) Act, 1907.	In section twenty-one, the words from "nor shall he" to the words immediately before "and it shall not be lawful".
8 Edw. 7. c. 15	Costs in Criminal Cases Act 1908	The Costs in Criminal Cases Act, 1908.	In section six, in subsection (2) the words from "or for any offence" to the words "Corrupt and Illegal Practices (Prevention) Act, 1883".
8 Edw. 7. c. 66	Public Meeting Act 1908	The Public Meeting Act, 1908.	In subsection (1) of section one, the words from "if the offence" to "other case"; and the whole act as respects meetings to which section eighty-four of this Act applies.
1 & 2 Geo. 5. c. 7	Municipal Elections (Corrupt and Illegal Practices) Act 1911	The Municipal Elections (Corrupt and Illegal Practices) Act, 1911.	The whole act.
2 & 3 Geo. 5. c. 28	Sheriff Courts (Scotland) Act 1913	The Sheriff Courts (Scotland) Act, 1913.	In the First Schedule, the provisions amending section twenty-one of the Sheriff Courts (Scotland) Act, 1907.
7 & 8 Geo. 5. c. 64	Representation of the People Act 1918	The Representation of the People Act, 1918.	The Sixth Schedule so far as it relates to subsection (1) of section twenty-nine of the Elections (Scotland) (Corrupt and Illegal Practices) Act, 1890.
9 & 10 Geo. 5. c. 13	Local Elections (Expenses) Act 1919	The Local Elections (Expenses) Act, 1919.	The whole act.
12 & 13 Geo. 5. c. 50	Expiring Laws Act 1922	The Expiring Laws Act, 1922.	In Part I of the First Schedule, the provision relating to the Corrupt Practices Prevention Act, 1854.
15 & 16 Geo. 5. c. 49	Supreme Court of Judicature (Consolidation) Act 1925	The Supreme Court of Judicature (Consolidation) Act, 1925.	In section thirty-one, in subsection (1), paragraph (j).
19 & 20 Geo. 5. c. 17	Local Government Act 1929	The Local Government Act, 1929.	Section eighty.
23 & 24 Geo. 5. c. 27	Blind Voters Act 1933	The Blind Voters Act, 1933.	The whole act.
23 & 24 Geo. 5. c. 51	Local Government Act 1933	The Local Government Act, 1933.	Sections twelve to sixteen. Sections twenty-six to thirty. Sections thirty-nine and forty. Sections fifty-three and fifty-four. In section fifty-five, in subsection (3) the words "and the enactments applied by, or parish election rules made under, this Act". In section sixty-seven, in subsection (1) the words from "and shall be conducted" to the end of the subsection. Section sixty-nine. In section seventy, in subsection (2) the words "register of electors, electors list, nomination paper, ballot paper". Section seventy-one. In section seventy-two, subsection (4). Section seventy-three. In section seventy-four, in subsections (1) and (2) the words "at an election under this Act or". Sections eighty and, save as it applies to polls consequent on a parish meeting, eighty-one. Section eighty-three. In section one hundred and five, subsection (3). In section one hundred and six, subsection (6). In section one hundred and eighty-seven, proviso (d) to subsection (2). In section two hundred and thirty-eight, in subsection (4) the words from "all the provisions" to "auditors and". In section three hundred and five, the definition of "electoral area". The Second Schedule.
1 & 2 Geo. 6. c. 59	Local Government (Hours of Poll) Act 1938	The Local Government (Hours of Poll) Act, 1938.	The whole act.
2 & 3 Geo. 6. c. 40	London Government Act 1939	The London Government Act, 1939.	Sections twelve to sixteen. Sections twenty-six to thirty. In section forty-two, in subsection (1) the words "and shall be conducted in the same manner as an ordinary election". Section forty-four. In section forty-five, in subsection (2) the words "register of electors, electors list, nomination paper, ballot paper". Section forty-six. In section forty-seven, subsection (3). Sections forty-eight and forty-nine. Sections fifty-four and fifty-five. Section fifty-seven. In section seventy-six, subsection (5). In section one hundred and twenty-two, proviso (d) to subsection (2). In section two hundred and six, the definition of "electoral area". The Second Schedule.
6 & 7 Geo. 6. c. 48	Parliament (Elections and Meeting) Act 1943	The Parliament (Elections and Meeting) Act, 1943.	Part II and the Fifth Schedule.
10 & 11 Geo. 6. c. 43	Local Government (Scotland) Act 1947	The Local Government (Scotland) Act, 1947.	Sections seven to eleven. Sections twenty-two to twenty-six. Sections forty-four to forty-six. In section fifty-nine, in subsection (3) the words "and shall be conducted" to "fix", and the words "who shall appoint a returning officer for the purposes of the election". Sections sixty to sixty-two. In section sixty-three, the words from "and the provisions" to the end. In section sixty-four, in subsection (1) the words from "and the provisions" to the end of the subsection. Sections sixty-five to sixty-eight. In section three hundred and seventy-nine, in subsection (1) the definition of "electoral area". The Second Schedule.
11 & 12 Geo. 6. c. 65	Representation of the People Act 1948	The Representation of the People Act, 1948.	In section one, subsections (2) and (3). Section two. Sections four to twenty. Part II. Sections thirty-two to fifty-one. In section fifty-two, subsections (1), (2), (3), (4) and (6), in subsection (5) the words "an election court or", the words "(whether under that section or otherwise)", and the words "by reference to section six or ten of the said Act". In section fifty-three, subsections (1) and (2). In section fifty-four, in subsection (1) the words "or Part IV of the Municipal Corporations Act, 1882", and the words "or this Part of this Act", and subsection (3). In section fifty-five, subsection (2). Section fifty-six. Section fifty-eight. Sections sixty and sixty-one. In section sixty-two, subsection (3). Section sixty-four. Sections sixty-six to seventy-one. Section seventy-three. In section seventy-four, subsection (4). In section seventy-five, in subsection (1) paragraph (b), and subsection (3). In section seventy-six, subsections (1), (2) and (4). In section seventy-seven, in subsection (1) the definitions of "county district" and "local government area", and subsections (2), (3) and (4), in subsection (5) the words from "except that" to the end. In section seventy-eight, subsection (4), and in subsection (3) the definition of "assessor". In section seventy-nine, in subsection (1) paragraphs (a) and (b). In section eighty, subsections (1), (3) and (4), and in subsection (10) paragraph (a). The Third, Fourth and Fifth Schedules. In the Seventh Schedule, the amendment of the Second Schedule to the Local Government (Scotland) Act, 1947. The Eighth and Ninth Schedules. In the Tenth Schedule; in Part I; in paragraph 1 in sub-paragraph (1) the words from "and writs" to the end of the sub-paragraph; paragraphs 2, 3 and 4; in paragraph 5, in sub-paragraph (1) the words from the beginning to "under this Act and" and the word "such" and except so far as those provisions amend section fifteen of the Parliamentary Elections Act, 1868, the remainder of the sub-paragraph and sub-paragraph (2); paragraphs 6 and 7; in paragraph 8 sub-paragraph (2); in Part II; in paragraph 1, sub-paragraphs (1) and (2); paragraph 2; and in paragraph 5, the words "and any other advance which is recoverable in the same way as an advance under that section". The Twelfth Schedule.
12 & 13 Geo. 6. c. 41	Ireland Act 1949	The Ireland Act, 1949.	Section six.
12, 13 & 14 Geo. 6. c. xiv	City of London (Various Powers) Act 1949	The City of London (Various Powers) Act, 1949.	Section ten.
Acts of the Irish Parliament
40 Geo. 3. c. 29 (I)	Act of Union (Election of Representatives) Act 1800	An Act to regulate the mode by which the Lords Spiritual and Temporal, and the Commons to serve in the United Kingdom on the part of Ireland, shall be summoned and returned to the said Parliament.	In section seven, the words from and such writs and the returns” to the end of the section.
40 Geo. 3. c. 38 (I)	Act of Union (Ireland) 1800	.An Act for the Union of Great Britain and Ireland.	In section eight, the words from and such writs and the returns” to the end of the section.
Orders in Council
SR&O 1921 /1802	Supreme Court of Judicature (Northern Ireland) Order 1921	The Supreme Court of Judicature (Northern Ireland), Order 1921.	Article fourteen.
SR&O 1922/1352	Government of Ireland (Election Laws Adaptation) (Northern Ireland) Order 1922	The Government of Ireland (Election Laws Adaptation) (Northern Ireland) Order, 1922.	The whole order.
SR&O 1924/927	Election Laws (Northern Ireland) Order 1924	The Election Laws (Northern Ireland) Order, 1924.	The whole order.
Order of the Secretary of State
SI 1949/719	Election Laws (Adaptation) Order 1949	The Election Laws (Adaptation) Order, 1949.	The whole order.

=== Short title, commencement and extent ===
Section 176(1) of the act provided that the act may be cited as the "Representation of the People Act, 1949" and may be cited as a Representation of the People Act.

Section 176(2) of the act provided that the provisions of the act relating to parliamentary elections, other than provisions as to the registration of parliamentary electors, shall come into force for the purposes of the first general election after the passing of this act.

Section 176(3) of the act provided that the provisions of the act apart from those in 176(2) of the act would come into force on a day appointed by the home secretary by statutory instrument.

Representation of the People Act 1949 (Date of Commencement) Order 1950 (Note: Section 1(1).)
- Statutory Instrument
- Parliament of the United Kingdom
- Citation: SI 1950/242
- Introduced by: James Chuter Ede MP (Commons)
- Territorial extent: United Kingdom

Dates
- Made: 11 February 1950
Other legislation
Made under	Representation of the People Act 1949

Status: Current legislation

Text of statute as originally enacted

The Representation of the People Act 1949 (Date of Commencement) Order 1950 (SI 1950/242) provided that the provisions of the act relating to local government elections, other than registration, would come into force on 11 March 1750 and that the rest of the act except section 176(2) would come into force on 3 April 1950. (Note: The Representation of the People Act 1949 (Date of Commencement) Order 1950)

== Subsequent developments ==
Section 146(1)(a) of the act was repealed for England and Wales by section 10(2) of, and part II of schedule 3 to, the Criminal Law Act 1967, which came into force on 1 January 1968.

The whole act, so far as unrepealed was repealed by section 206 of, and part II of schedule 9 to, the Representation of the People Act 1983, which came into force on 15 March 1983.

== Elections (Welsh Forms) Act 1964 ==
The Elections (Welsh Forms) Act 1964 allowed for Welsh translations of election forms to be used in Wales.

== See also ==
- Reform Acts
- Representation of the People Act

== Bibliography ==
- D. J. Rossiter, Ronald John Johnston, C. J. Pattie, "The Boundary Commissions: redrawing the UK's map of parliamentary constituencies", Manchester University Press, 1999, p. 87–90.
