= House of Commons (Redistribution of Seats) Act 1949 =

Act of the Parliament of the United Kingdom

House of Commons (Redistribution of Seats) Act 1949 (Note: Section 9(1).)
- Act of Parliament
- Parliament of the United Kingdom
- Long title: An Act to consolidate the enactments which make permanent provision for the redistribution of seats at parliamentary elections and the provisions of the Representation of the People Act, 1948, interpreting statutory references to constituencies.
- Citation: 12, 13 & 14 Geo. 6. c. 66
- Territorial extent: United Kingdom

Dates
- Royal assent: 24 November 1949
- Commencement: 1 April 1950 (Note: Section 9(2). The House of Commons (Redistribution of Seats) Act 1949 (Date of Commencement) Order 1950 (SI 1950/371).)
- Repealed: 7 February 1987
Other legislation
Amends	See § Repealed enactments
Repeals/revokes	See § Repealed enactments
Amended by	House of Commons (Redistribution of Seats) Order 1949; House of Commons (Redistribution of Seats) (No. 2) Order 1949; House of Commons (Redistribution of Seats) (No. 3) Order 1949; House of Commons (Redistribution of Seats) (No. 4) Order 1949; Statute Law Revision Act 1953; House of Commons (Redistribution of Seats) Act 1958; House of Commons (Redistribution of Seats) Act 1979; Statute Law (Repeals) Act 1986
Repealed by	Parliamentary Constituencies Act 1986
Relates to	Representation of the People Act 1949

Status: Repealed

Text of statute as originally enacted

The House of Commons (Redistribution of Seats) Act 1949 (12, 13 & 14 Geo. 6. c. 66) was an act of the Parliament of the United Kingdom that provided for the periodic review of the number and boundaries of parliamentary constituencies.

The act amended the rules for the distribution of seats to be followed by the boundary commissions for each of the constituent countries of the United Kingdom. The commissions had been created under the House of Commons (Redistribution of Seats) Act 1944 (7 & 8 Geo. 6. c. 41), and their initial reviews of constituencies had been implemented by the Representation of the People Act 1948 (11 & 12 Geo. 6. c. 65).

Under the act, each commission was to make its first periodic report within seven years of the passing of the Representation of the People Act 1948 (11 & 12 Geo. 6. c. 65). Subsequent reports were to be issued not less than three and not more than seven years after the first periodic report. Reports were to be made to the Home Secretary, and were to contain the proposed constituency boundaries. The Home Secretary could then issue a draft Order in Council, to be approved by both houses of parliament. Once approved, the draft order would be presented to the Privy Council, and enacted via a statutory instrument. Any changes in seats would not take place until the next dissolution of parliament and calling of a general election.

== Rules for redistribution of seats ==
The act contained a number of rules to guide the work of the commissions.

=== Number of constituencies ===
- Great Britain was to have "not substantially greater or less than" 613 constituencies.
  - Scotland was to have not less than 71 constituencies.
  - Wales was to have not less than 35 constituencies.
- Northern Ireland was to have 12 constituencies.
- Every constituency was to return a single Member of Parliament.

=== Rules on dividing and combining counties and districts ===
"As far as practicable" in England and Wales:

- The City of London was not to be divided, and the name of the constituency in which it was included had to include the term "City of London".
- No constituency was to combine the whole or parts of different administrative counties, and county boroughs or metropolitan boroughs were not be included with adjacent counties.
- No county borough (or any part thereof) was to be included in a constituency with any other county borough or part of a metropolitan borough.
- No metropolitan borough was to be included in a constituency which included the whole or part of any other metropolitan borough.
- No county district (municipal borough, urban district or rural district) was to be included partly in one constituency and partly in another.

In Scotland:

- No burgh other than a county of a city was to be divided between constituencies

In Northern Ireland:

- No county district was to be included partly in one constituency and partly in another.

=== Electorate ===
The electorate of any constituency was to be as close as possible to a country-specific electoral quota to reduce malapportionment; where rigid adherence to the "as far as practicable" guidelines would mean a large disparity between electorates, the commissions were expressly empowered to form seats which combine parts of two (and where major disparity still remains, more) local government areas.

The electoral quota was obtained by dividing the total electorate for either Great Britain or Northern Ireland by the number of allocated seats.

=== Special geographical considerations ===
Each commission was allowed to depart from the rules on areas or electorate in special cases "including in particular the size, shape and accessibility of a constituency" in order to form constituencies.

=== Repealed enactments ===
Section 8(1) of the act repealed four enactments, listed in the third schedule to the act.

Citation	Short title	Extent of repeal
7 & 8 Geo. 6. c. 41	House of Commons (Redistribution of Seats) Act 1944	The whole act.
8 & 9 Geo. 6. c. 5	Representation of the People Act 1945	Section thirty-three.
10 & 11 Geo. 6. c. 10	House of Commons (Redistribution of Seats) Act 1947	The whole act.
11 & 12 Geo. 6. c. 65	Representation of the People Act 1948	Section three; subsection (3) of section fifty-nine; in section eighty-one the words "and 'the House of Commons (Redistribution of Seats) Act, 1947'"; the Second Schedule; and in the Tenth Schedule, in paragraph 1 of Part I, in sub-paragraph (1) the words from the beginning to "and boroughs" and sub-paragraphs (2) and (3).

=== Short title, commencement and extent ===
Section 9(1) of the act provided that the act may be cited as the "House of Commons (Redistribution of Seats) Act 1949" and may be cited as a Representation of the People Act.

Section 9(2) of the act provided that the act provided that the act would come into force on a day not earlier than section 1(1) of the appointed by the home secretary by statutory instrument.

House of Commons (Redistribution of Seats) Act 1949 (Date of Commencement) Order 1950 (Note: Section 2.)
- Statutory Instrument
- Parliament of the United Kingdom
- Citation: SI 1950/371
- Introduced by: James Chuter Ede (Commons)
- Territorial extent: United Kingdom

Dates
- Made: 15 March 1950
- Commencement: 1 April 1950 (Note: Section 1.)
Other legislation
Made under	House of Commons (Redistribution of Seats) Act 1949
Relates to	Representation of the People Act 1949 (Date of Commencement) Order 1950

Status: Current legislation

Text of statute as originally enacted

The House of Commons (Redistribution of Seats) Act 1949 (Date of Commencement) Order 1950 (SI 1950/371) provided that the act would come into force on 1 April 1950.

== Subsequent developments ==
House of Commons (Redistribution of Seats) Act 1958 (Note: Section 7(1).)
- Act of Parliament
- Parliament of the United Kingdom
- Long title: An Act to amend the House of Commons (Redistribution of Seats) Act, 1949.
- Citation: 6 & 7 Eliz. 2. c. 26
- Territorial extent: United Kingdom

Dates
- Royal assent: 14 May 1958
- Commencement: 14 May 1958 (Note: The Acts of Parliament (Commencement) Act 1793.)
- Repealed: 7 February 1987
Other legislation
Amends	House of Commons (Redistribution of Seats) Act 1949
Amended by	Statute Law (Repeals) Act 1974
Repealed by	Parliamentary Constituencies Act 1986
Relates to	House of Commons (Redistribution of Seats) Act 1979

Status: Repealed

Text of statute as originally enacted

Following successful legal action the act was amended by the House of Commons (Redistribution of Seats) Act 1958 (6 & 7 Eliz. 2. c. 26). This removed the Director General of the Ordnance Survey from each commission, and in each case appointed a judge to be deputy chairman. It also modified the definition of "electoral quota" so that it – in England, Scotland and Wales – would mean respective quotas for each country, based on the prior number of constituencies. A new procedure was established, forcing a local inquiry to be held if many objections arose to changes.

House of Commons (Redistribution of Seats) Act 1979 (Note: Section 2.)
- Act of Parliament
- Parliament of the United Kingdom
- Long title: An Act to increase the number of constituencies in Northern Ireland required by rule 1 in Schedule 2 to the House of Commons (Redistribution of Seats) Act 1949.
- Citation: 1979 c. 15
- Territorial extent: United Kingdom

Dates
- Royal assent: 22 March 1979
- Commencement: 22 March 1979 (Note: The Interpretation Act 1978.)
- Repealed: 7 February 1987
Other legislation
Amends	House of Commons (Redistribution of Seats) Act 1949
Repealed by	Parliamentary Constituencies Act 1986
Relates to	Northern Ireland Constitution Act 1973; House of Commons (Redistribution of Seats) Act 1958

Status: Repealed

Text of statute as originally enacted

The House of Commons (Redistribution of Seats) Act 1979 (c. 15) amended the 1949 act in respect to Northern Ireland, increasing the number of constituencies in the province to 17 in number. Northern Ireland had been under-represented in the Commons to compensate for the existence of a devolved parliament. However, this had been abolished in 1973. The number of seats could be decreased to 16 or increased to 18 in the future.

Section 5, in section 6, the words from "for any reference" (where first occurring) to "burgh, and" and from "whether" to "other Act", and sections 8 and 9(2), of the act were repealed by section 1(1) of, and part X of schedule 1 to, the Statute Law (Repeals) Act 1986, which came into force on 2 May 1986.

The 1949, 1958 and 1979 acts were repealed by section 8(1) of, and schedule 4 to, the Parliamentary Constituencies Act 1986, which came into force on 7 February 1987. The 1986 act remains the current primary legislation governing allocation of constituencies.
