= Ballot Act 1872 =

Act of the Parliament of the United Kingdom reforming the electoral system

Ballot Act 1872 (Note: Section 33.)
- Act of Parliament
- Parliament of the United Kingdom
- Long title: An Act to amend the Law relating to Procedure at Parliamentary and Municipal Elections.
- Citation: 35 & 36 Vict. c. 33
- Introduced by: Edward Aldam Leatham (Commons)
- Territorial extent: United Kingdom

Dates
- Royal assent: 18 July 1872
- Commencement: 18 July 1872 (Note: The Acts of Parliament (Commencement) Act 1793.)
- Expired: 31 December 1880 (Note: Section 33.)
- Repealed: United Kingdom: 3 April 1950 (Note: The Representation of the People Act 1949 (Date of Commencement) Order 1950.); Republic of Ireland: 12 July 1963 (Note: The Electoral Act 1963 (Commencement) Order 1963.)
Other legislation
Amends	Electors of Knights of the Shires Act 1429; Parliamentary Boundaries Act 1832
Repeals/revokes	Parliamentary Elections Act 1698; Parliamentary Elections, New Shoreham Act 1771; Parliamentary Elections (Cricklade) Act 1782; Oaths at Parliamentary Elections Act 1794; Oaths at Parliamentary Elections Act 1802; Parliamentary Elections Act 1803; Parliamentary Elections, Aylesbury Act 1804; Bribery, East Retford Act 1830; Burghs, etc. (Scotland) Act 1834; Royal Burghs, etc. (Scotland) Act 1834; Parliamentary Elections (Scotland) Act 1834; Parliamentary Elections (No. 2) Act 1836; Parliamentary Elections (Ireland) Act 1846; Parliamentary Elections (Scotland) Act 1855; Parliamentary Elections Act 1862; Parliamentary Elections (Scotland) Act 1865
Amended by	Municipal Corporations Act 1882; Town Councils (Scotland) Act 1900; Costs in Criminal Cases Act 1908; Forgery Act 1913; Representation of the People Act 1918; Blind Voters Act 1933; Local Government Act 1933; Parliament (Elections and Meeting) Act 1943; Local Government (Scotland) Act 1947; Representation of the People Act 1948
Repealed by	United Kingdom: Representation of the People Act 1949; Republic of Ireland: Electoral Act 1963
Relates to	Representation of the People Act 1867; Municipal Elections Act 1875; Parliamentary Elections (Returning Officers) Act 1875; Corrupt and Illegal Practices Prevention Act 1883

Status: Repealed

Text of statute as originally enacted

The Ballot Act 1872 (Note: Section 33.) (35 & 36 Vict. c. 33) was an act of the Parliament of the United Kingdom that introduced the requirement for parliamentary and local government elections in the United Kingdom to be held by secret ballot. The act abolished the traditional hustings system of nomination and election in Britain.

== Background ==
Employers and landowners had been able to use their sway over employees and tenants to influence the vote, either by being present themselves or by sending representatives to check on the votes as they were being cast. Small retailers were also concerned not to upset their bigger customers by voting differently from them. Radicals, such as the Chartists, had long campaigned for the system to end by the introduction of a secret ballot.

The Representation of the People Act 1867 (30 & 31 Vict. c. 102), or Second Reform Act, enfranchised the skilled working class in borough constituencies, and it was felt that their economic circumstances would cause such voters to be particularly susceptible to bribery, intimidation or blackmail. The radical John Bright expressed concerns that tenants would face the threat of eviction if they voted against the wishes of their landlord. It fell to Edward Aldam Leatham, the husband of Bright's sister, to introduce the Ballot Act on leave. The events are reflected in the 1867–1868 novel Phineas Finn.

Many in the Establishment had opposed the introduction of a secret ballot. They felt that pressure from patrons on tenants was legitimate and that a secret ballot was simply unmanly and cowardly. Lord Russell voiced his opposition to the creation of a culture of secrecy in elections, which he believed should be public affairs. He saw it as "an obvious prelude to change from household to universal suffrage".

Election spending at the time was unlimited, and many voters would take bribes from both sides. While the secret ballot might have had some effect in reducing corruption in British politics, the Corrupt and Illegal Practices Prevention Act 1883 (46 & 47 Vict. c. 51) formalised the position and is seen by many to have been the key legislation in the attempts to end electoral corruption.

The act, in combination with the Municipal Elections Act 1875 (38 & 39 Vict. c. 40) and the Parliamentary Elections (Returning Officers) Act 1875 (38 & 39 Vict. c. 84), is considered to have ushered in today's electoral practices.

== Effects ==
The secret ballot mandated by the act was first used on 15 August 1872 to re-elect Hugh Childers as MP for Pontefract in a ministerial by-election, following his appointment as Chancellor of the Duchy of Lancaster. The original ballot box, sealed in wax with a liquorice stamp, is held at Pontefract museum. Of those who voted, 16%, were illiterate, and special arrangements had to be made to record their previously-open oral votes.

The first general election using a secret ballot was in 1874, which saw the first Conservative majority elected since 1841.

The act was of particular importance in Ireland, as it enabled tenants to vote against the landlord class in parliamentary elections. The principal result of the Act was seen in the general election of 1880, which marked the end of a landlord interest in both Ireland and Great Britain.

Although the ballot in the UK is routinely characterized as "secret" the fact that ballot papers are numbered, and that the voter's electoral roll identifier is written on its identically numbered counterfoil by the officer issuing the ballot to the voter at the voting station, means that in principle the identity of a voter can be linked to the ballot they cast.

=== Abroad ===
The act inspired Belgian minister Jules Malou to implement a similar system in Belgium, which he did with the act of 9 July 1877 (la loi du 9 juillet 1877 sur le secret du vote et les fraudes électorales). The elections of 1878 were a victory for the Liberal Party.

== Subsequent developments ==
The whole act was repealed by section 175(1) of, and the ninth schedule to, the Representation of the People Act 1949 (12, 13 & 14 Geo. 6. c. 68), which came into force on 3 April 1850.

== See also ==
- Postal voting
- Reform Acts
- Representation of the People Act
