= Parliamentary Constituencies Act 1986 =

Act of the Parliament of the United Kingdom

Parliamentary Constituencies Act 1986 (Note: Section 9(1).)
- Act of Parliament
- Parliament of the United Kingdom
- Long title: An Act to consolidate the House of Commons (Redistribution of Seats) Acts 1949 to 1979 and certain related enactments.
- Citation: 1986 c. 56
- Territorial extent: United Kingdom (Note: Section 9(3).)

Dates
- Royal assent: 7 November 1986
- Commencement: 7 February 1987 (Note: Section 9(2))

Other legislation
- Amends: Northern Ireland Constitution Act 1973; Local Government Reorganisation (Consequential Provisions) (Northern Ireland) Order 1973; House of Commons Disqualification Act 1975; Northern Ireland Assembly Disqualification Act 1975; European Assembly Elections Act 1978; Finance (No. 2) Act 1983; See § Repealed enactments
- Repeals/revokes: See § Repealed enactments
- Amended by: Taxation of Chargeable Gains Act 1992; Boundary Commissions Act 1992; Scotland Act 1998; Northern Ireland Act 1998; European Parliamentary Elections Act 1999; Political Parties, Elections and Referendums Act 2000; Secretary of State for Constitutional Affairs Order 2003; Statistics and Registration Service Act 2007; Parliamentary Voting System and Constituencies Act 2011; Fixed-term Parliaments Act 2011; Transfer of Functions (Elections, Referendums, Third Sector and Information) Order 2016; Transfer of Functions (Parliamentary Constituencies Act 1986) Order 2018; European Parliamentary Elections Etc. (Repeal, Revocation, Amendment and Saving Provisions) (United Kingdom and Gibraltar) (EU Exit) Regulations 2018; Parliamentary Constituencies Act 2020; Transfer of Functions (Secretary of State for Levelling Up, Housing and Communities) Order 2021

Status: Amended

Text of statute as originally enacted

Revised text of statute as amended

Text of the Parliamentary Constituencies Act 1986 as in force today (including any amendments) within the United Kingdom, from legislation.gov.uk.

The Parliamentary Constituencies Act 1986 (c. 56) is an act of the Parliament of the United Kingdom. It is the current legislation defining the constitution and work of the four parliamentary Boundary Commissions in the UK.

== Provisions ==
The act consolidated earlier legislation, namely the House of Commons (Redistribution of Seats) Act 1949 (12, 13 & 14 Geo. 6. c. 66), the House of Commons (Redistribution of Seats) Act 1958 (6 & 7 Eliz. 2. c. 26) and the House of Commons (Redistribution of Seats) Act 1979.

=== Repealed enactments ===
Section 8(1) of the act repealed 8 enactments, listed in schedule 4 to the act.

Enactments repealed by section 8(1)
Citation	Short title	Extent of repeal
11 & 12 Geo. 6. c. 65	Representation of the People Act 1948	Section 1(1). Section 81.
12, 13 & 14 Geo. 6. c. 66	House of Commons (Redistribution of Seats) Act 1949	The whole act.
6 & 7 Eliz. 2. c. 26	House of Commons (Redistribution of Seats) Act 1958	The whole act.
1963 c. 33	London Government Act 1963	Section 4(7)(c). Section 8(1). In Schedule 3, in Part II, paragraph 21.
1973 c. 36	Northern Ireland Constitution Act 1973	Section 28(7).
1973 c. 65	Local Government (Scotland) Act 1973	In Schedule 3, paragraphs 1 and 19.
1979 c. 15	House of Commons (Redistribution of Seats) Act 1979	The whole act.
1986 c. 12	Statute Law (Repeals) Act 1986	In Schedule 2, paragraph 4(1).

Section 8(2) of the act also revoked article 2(7) of the SI 1973/2095 (the Local Government Reorganisation (Consequential Provisions) (Northern Ireland) Order 1973).

== Amendment ==
The Boundary Commissions Act 1992 amended the 1986 act to reduce the intervals between redistributions from 10-15 years to 8-12 years. Thie meant that the commissions had to report by December 1994, but the commissions found this difficult and only the Scottish commission managed to complete this in time. The 1997 election was fought on the boundaries as modified by this review.

In February 2011, the Parliamentary Voting System and Constituencies Act 2011 received royal assent, which substantially amended the act. The changes affected the Sixth Periodic Review of Westminster constituencies which provides for a review to be laid before Parliament that contains 50 fewer constituencies and less variation in electorates. It also provides for more frequent boundary reviews and a small reduction in the length of the consultation period.
