= House of Commons (Redistribution of Seats) Act 1944 =

Act of the Parliament of the United Kingdom

House of Commons (Redistribution of Seats) Act 1944 (Note: Section 8.)
- Act of Parliament
- Parliament of the United Kingdom
- Long title: An Act to make temporary provision for the division of abnormally large constituencies together in certain cases with adjoining constituencies, and permanent provision for the redistribution of seats at parliamentary elections.
- Citation: 7 & 8 Geo. 6. c. 41
- Territorial extent: United Kingdom

Dates
- Royal assent: 26 October 1944
- Commencement: 26 October 1944 (Note: The Acts of Parliament (Commencement) Act 1793.)
- Repealed: 1 April 1950 (Note: The House of Commons (Redistribution of Seats) Act 1949 (Date of Commencement) Order 1950.)
Other legislation
Amended by	Representation of the People Act 1945; House of Commons (Redistribution of Seats) Act 1947; Representation of the People Act 1948
Repealed by	House of Commons (Redistribution of Seats) Act 1949
Relates to	Representation of the People Act 1948; Representation of the People Act 1949

Status: Repealed

Text of statute as originally enacted

The House of Commons (Redistribution of Seats) Act 1944 (7 & 8 Geo. 6. c. 41) was an act of the Parliament of the United Kingdom that established permanent boundary commissions for each of the constituent countries of the United Kingdom, and provided for the periodic review of the number and boundaries of parliamentary constituencies.

The act established the membership of each commission, the procedures to be followed by the commissions, and the rules for the redistribution of seats for the commissions to observe. The commissions' initial reviews of constituencies under the act were implemented by the Representation of the People Act 1948 (11 & 12 Geo. 6. c. 65).

== Provisions ==
=== Speaker's Conference and resultant legislation ===
The rules continuing into the 21st century for the redistributions of seats in the House Commons evolved from the Speaker's Conference in 1944.

The conference recommended an electoral quota for Great Britain calculated from the electorate and a 25 per cent tolerance on either side and that the total number of Members of the House of Commons should remain substantially the same with the Northern Ireland seats fixed at 12; the number of Scottish seats should be not less than 71 and the number of Welsh seats not less than 35. This was swiftly enacted in the act. In the period 1944 to 1958, the primacy of equality rule was diluted in five ways by further legislation:

- Abolition of strict 25 per cent rule
- Introduction of separate quotas for England, Wales and Scotland
- Greater presumption against inconveniences of disruption.
- Mandatory local inquiries in certain circumstances
- A longer period between reviews of 10 to 15 years, rather than 3 to 7

Thereafter, the rules were only subject to minor change by statute, mainly to take account of changes in local authority structures.

=== The boundary commissions ===
The Speaker of the House of Commons was to be the chairman of each of the four commissions. The remaining members were as follows:

==== Boundary Commission for England ====
- The Registrar General of Births, Deaths and Marriages in England
- The Director General of the Ordnance Survey
- One member appointed by the Home Secretary
- One member appointed by the Minister of Health

==== Boundary Commission for Scotland ====
- The Registrar General of Births, Deaths and Marriages in Scotland
- The Director General of the Ordnance Survey
- Two members appointed by the Secretary of State for Scotland

==== Boundary Commission for Wales ====
- The Registrar General of Births, Deaths and Marriages in England
- The Director General of the Ordnance Survey
- One member appointed by the Home Secretary
- One member appointed by the Minister of Health

(For the purposes of the act Wales included Monmouthshire)

==== Boundary Commission for Northern Ireland ====
- The Registrar General of Births, Deaths and Marriages for Northern Ireland
- The Commissioner of Valuation for Northern Ireland
- Two other members appointed by the Home Secretary

No member of the Commons, or of either house of the Parliament of Northern Ireland was qualified to be a commissioner, and any serving commissioner would be disqualified on becoming a member of any of these bodies.

=== Rules for redistribution of seats ===
The act contained a number of rules to guide the work of the commissions.

==== Number of constituencies ====
- Great Britain was to have "not substantially greater or less than" 591 constituencies.
- Scotland was to have not less than 71 constituencies.
- Wales was to have not less than 35 constituencies.
- Northern Ireland was to have 12 constituencies.

==== Rules on dividing and combining counties and districts ====
"As far as practicable" in England and Wales:

- No county (or any part thereof) was to be included in a constituency with the whole or part of any other county, or part of a county borough or a metropolitan borough.
- No county borough (or any part thereof) was to be included in a constituency with any other county borough or part of a metropolitan borough.
- No metropolitan borough was to be included in a constituency which included the whole or part of any other metropolitan borough.
- No county district (municipal borough, urban district or rural district) was to be included partly in one constituency and partly in another.

In Scotland:

- No county or burgh could be partly in one parliamentary county and partly in another, or be divided between a parliamentary county and a parliamentary burgh.
- No burgh other than a county of a city was to be divided between constituencies.

In Northern Ireland:

- No county district was to be included partly in one constituency and partly in another.

==== Electorate ====
The electorate of any constituency should not differ from the "electoral quota" by more than 25%.

The electoral quota was obtained by dividing the total electorate for either Great Britain or Northern Ireland by the number of allocated seats.

==== Special geographical considerations ====
Each commission was allowed to depart from the rules on area and population in special cases, to account for factors "including in particular the size, shape and accessibility of a constituency."

=== Short title, commencement and extent ===
Section 8 of the act provided that the act may be cited as the "House of Commons (Redistribution of Seats) Act, 1944" and may be cited as a Representation of the People Act.

== Amendment and repeal ==
House of Commons (Redistribution of Seats) Act 1947 (Note: Section 2.)
- Act of Parliament
- Parliament of the United Kingdom
- Long title: An Act to relax the rules set out in the Third Schedule to the House of Commons (Redistribution of Seats) Act, 1944, so far as they relate to the application of the electoral quota and, in consequence thereof, to postpone the enumeration date for the purposes of the initial report under section three of that Act.
- Citation: 10 & 11 Geo. 6. c. 10
- Territorial extent: United Kingdom

Dates
- Royal assent: 18 February 1947
- Commencement: 18 February 1947 (Note: The Acts of Parliament (Commencement) Act 1793.)
- Repealed: 1 April 1950 (Note: The House of Commons (Redistribution of Seats) Act 1949 (Date of Commencement) Order 1950.)
Other legislation
Amends	House of Commons (Redistribution of Seats) Act 1944
Amended by	Representation of the People Act 1948
Repealed by	House of Commons (Redistribution of Seats) Act 1949
Relates to	Representation of the People Act 1948; Representation of the People Act 1949

Status: Repealed

Text of statute as originally enacted

The act was amended by the House of Commons (Redistribution of Seats) Act 1947 (10 & 11 Geo. 6. c. 10).

The whole act was succeeded and repealed by section 8(1) of, and the third schedule to, the House of Commons (Redistribution of Seats) Act 1949 (12, 13 & 14 Geo. 6. c. 66), which came into force on 1 April 1950. The act amended the rules for the redistribution of seats, but did not change the membership or procedures of the commissions.
