= List of statutory instruments of the United Kingdom, 1950 =

This is an incomplete list of statutory instruments of the United Kingdom in 1950.

== Statutory instruments ==
=== 1-499 ===
- Control of Growing Trees (Felling and Selling) Order 1950 (SI 1950/1)
- Control of Growing Trees (Felling and Selling) (Northern Ireland) Order 1950 (SI 1950/2)
- Income Tax (Applications for Increase of Wear and Tear Percentages) Regulations 1950 (SI 1950/3)
- Control of Paper (Specified Material) Order 1950 (SI 1950/4)
- Public Health (Aircraft) Regulations 1950 (SI 1950/6)
- Drying of Vegetables (Revocation) Order 1950 (SI 1950/7)
- Gas (Conversion Date) (No. 11) Order 1950 (SI 1950/10)
- Emergency Powers (Defence) Road Vehicles and Drivers (Revocation) Order 1950 (SI 1950/13)
- Boot and Shoe Repairing Wages Council (Great Britain) (Constitution) Order 1950 (SI 1950/15)
- Land Drainage (River Boards) General Regulations 1950 (SI 1950/16)
- Railways (Transport of Potatoes) Direction 1950 (SI 1950/19)
- Teachers Superannuation (Royal Air Force) (Locally Engaged Teachers) Scheme 1950 (SI 1950/21)
- Control of Paint (Revocation) Order 1950 (SI 1950/24)
- Utility Curtain Cloth Order 1950 (SI 1950/26)
- Trading with the Enemy (Authorisation) (Japan) Order 1950 (SI 1950/28)
- Trading with the Enemy (Transfer of Negotiable Instruments, etc.) (Japan) Order 1950 (SI 1950/29)
- Trading with the Enemy (Custodian) (Amendment) (Japan) Order 1950 (SI 1950/30)
- Increase of Pensions (Calculation of Income) (Supplemental) Regulations 1950 (SI 1950/34)
- Lothians and Peebles Police (Amalgamation) Order 1950 (SI 1950/36)
- Fire Services (Ranks and Conditions of Service) Regulations 1950 (SI 1950/38)
- Hire-Purchase and Credit Sale Agreements (Maximum Prices and Charges) Order 1950 (SI 1950/39)
- Calf Rearing Scheme (England, Wales and Northern Ireland) (Extension and Payment) Order 1950 (SI 1950/41)
- Superannuation (Appointment of End of War Period) Order 1950 (SI 1950/42)
- Elementary School Teachers Superannuation (Amending) Rules 1950 (SI 1950/60)
- Pottery (Health and Welfare) Special Regulations 1950 (SI 1950/65)
- Coast Protection (Notices) Regulations 1950 (SI 1950/124)
- Representation of the People Act 1949 (Date of Commencement) Order 1950 (SI 1950/242)
- Beccles Water Order 1950 (SI 1950/257)
- Commonwealth Telegraphs (Pension Rights of Cable and Wireless Ltd. Staff) Regulations 1950 (SI 1950/356)
- Grinding of Cutlery and Edge Tools (Amendment) Special Regulations 1950 (SI 1950/370)
- House of Commons (Redistribution of Seats) Act 1949 (Date of Commencement) Order 1950 (SI 1950/371)
- Coal Industry Nationalisation (Superannuation) Regulations 1950 (SI 1950/376)
- Prevention of Damage by Pests (Infestation of Food) Regulations 1950 (SI 1950/416)
- Registered Designs Appeal Tribunal Rules 1950 (SI 1950/430) (L. 9)
- Utility Woven Cloth (Cotton, Rayon and Linen) (Amendment) Order 1950 (SI 1950/450)
- Trading with the Enemy (Custodian) Order 1950 (SI 1950/494)

=== 500-999 ===
- Lands Tribunal (War Damage Appeals Jurisdiction) Order 1950 (SI 1950/513)
- Grinding of Metals (Miscellaneous Industries) (Amendment) Special Regulations 1950 (SI 1950/688)
- Town and Country Planning General Development Order and Development Charge Applications Regulations 1950 (SI 1950/728)
- Double Taxation Relief (Taxes on Income) (British Solomon Islands Protectorate) Order 1950 (SI 1950/748)
- Double Taxation Relief (Taxes on Income) (Gilbert and Ellice Islands Colony) Order 1950 (SI 1950/750)
- Town and Country Planning (Churches, Places of Religious Worship and Burial Grounds) Regulations 1950 (SI 1950/792)
- Traffic Signs (Size, Colour and Type) Regulations 1950 (SI 1950/953)

=== 1000-1499 ===
- National Parks and Access to the Countryside (Amendment) Regulations 1950 (SI 1950/1066)
- Veterinary Surgeons (University Degrees) (Liverpool) Order of Council 1950 (SI 1950/1110)
- Town and Country Planning (Use Classes) Order 1950 (SI 1950/1131)
- Foreign Compensation (Administrative and Financial Provisions) Order in Council 1950 (SI 1950/1193)
- Double Taxation Relief (Taxes on Income) (Denmark) Order 1950 (SI 1950/1195)
- Census of Distribution (1951) (Restriction on Disclosure) Order 1950 (SI 1950/1245)
- Veterinary Surgeons (University Degrees) (Bristol) Order of Council 1950 (SI 1950/1301)
- British Wool Marketing Scheme (Approval) Order 1950 (SI 1950/1326)

=== 1500-1999 ===
- Foundries (Parting Materials) Special Regulations 1950 (SI 1950/1700)
- Agricultural Marketing (Reorganisation Commission) Regulations 1950 (SI 1950/1869)
- Double Taxation Relief (Taxes on Income) (Brunei) Order 1950 (SI 1950/1977)

=== 2000-2499 ===
- Isle of Wight Water Board Order 1950 (SI 1950/2009)
- Maintenance Orders Act 1950 (Summary Jurisdiction) Rules 1950 (SI 1950/2035)
- Airways Corporations (General Staff Pensions) Regulations 1950 (SI 1950/2056)

== See also ==
- List of statutory instruments of the United Kingdom
