= Representation of the People Act 1948 =

Act of the Parliament of the United Kingdom

Representation of the People Act 1948 (Note: Section 81.)
- Act of Parliament
- Parliament of the United Kingdom
- Long title: An Act to amend the law relating to parliamentary and local government elections and to corrupt and illegal practices, and for purposes connected therewith.
- Citation: 11 & 12 Geo. 6. c. 65
- Introduced by: James Chuter Ede MP (Commons)
- Territorial extent: United Kingdom

Dates
- Royal assent: 30 July 1948
- Commencement: 30 July 1948 (except part V and part VI as relates to part V); 1 October 1948: part V and part VI as relates to part V; (Note: Section 80.)
- Repealed: 7 February 1987
Other legislation
Amends	See § Repealed enactments
Repeals/revokes	See § Repealed enactments
Amended by	House of Commons (Redistribution of Seats) Act 1949; Representation of the People Act 1949; Election Commissioners Act 1949; Statute Law Revision Act 1953; Licensing (Scotland) Act 1959; Criminal Justice Act 1972; Statute Law (Repeals) Act 1978; Representation of the People Act 1983
Repealed by	Statute Law (Repeals) Act 1986; Parliamentary Constituencies Act 1986

Status: Repealed

Text of statute as originally enacted

The Representation of the People Act 1948 (11 & 12 Geo. 6. c. 65) was an act of the Parliament of the United Kingdom that altered the law relating to parliamentary and local elections. It is noteworthy for abolishing multi-member districts, abolishing the university constituencies, abolishing plural voting and single transferable voting for parliamentary elections; and for again increasing the number of members overall, in this case to 613.

== Provisions ==
=== Part I: Parliamentary franchise and its exercise ===
Part I of the act declared that in future the United Kingdom would be divided into single-member borough constituencies and county constituencies. These terms replaced the former designations of parliamentary borough/division of a parliamentary borough and parliamentary county/division of a parliamentary county (in Scotland "burgh constituencies" replaced parliamentary burghs). There were to be 613 such constituencies, in place of the 591 under previous legislation.

These were to be the only constituencies, and the act thus abolished the university constituencies; thus graduates of universities (about 7% of the electorate) no longer had the right to vote in two constituencies. Constituencies which had been represented by more than one MP were also abolished.

Persons eligible to vote were to be British subjects of "full age" (21 years) and "not subject to any legal incapacity to vote", provided that they were registered to vote in the constituency. Each voter was only permitted to cast their vote in one constituency, even if for some reason they were registered in more than one. The arrangements which had given plural votes to electors who met a property qualification because of their business or shop premises were abolished.

Each constituency was to have an electoral registration officer, who was to compile the electoral register. In England and Wales, this officer was the clerk of the appropriate county or borough council; in Scotland, it was the assessor of a county or large burgh; and in Northern Ireland it was the town clerk of the county borough of Belfast or the secretary of the county council. An electoral register was to be published in Spring and Autumn of each year.

Qualifications for an elector to be registered were set out, with residence in the constituency on a specified date being the principal requirement. There was an additional "service qualification" for members of the armed forces and other persons outside the state on diplomatic or other Crown business, and their spouses. Electors were to vote in person, except in exceptional circumstances in which a proxy vote might be permitted.

Each constituency was to be divided into polling districts by the registration officer, who was also to designate polling places within each district. Rules were laid down for the process: for instance each civil parish in an English or Welsh county constituency was to be a separate district. Where a group of thirty electors felt that they were not provided with a convenient polling place, they were entitled to petition the Secretary of State for a review.

The procedures for recounts and for choosing the winning candidate by lot in the event of a tie were laid down. A candidate who received less than an eighth of the total number of votes cast would forfeit their monetary deposit.

Finally Part I dealt with the appointment and duties of the returning officer. In England and Wales these were to be either the high sheriff of a county, the sheriff of a county corporate, the mayor of a borough or the chairman of an urban district council, as appointed by the Home Secretary. In Scotland the returning officer was to be a sheriff of a local sheriffdom, and in Northern Ireland the under-sheriff of a county or county borough.

=== Part II: General provisions as to local government franchise and its exercise ===
The electorate for local elections was larger than that for parliamentary elections. Apart from those resident in the district, there was an additional "non-resident qualification" to vote where an owner or tenant occupied rateable land or premises therein of the yearly value of not less than ten pounds. The electoral registration officer appointed under Part I of the act was also to compile a local government register, although the two registers could be combined, with the names of those persons registered only as local government electors marked. Electors were not permitted to be registered more than once in a single local government district, even if they occupied multiple premises. There was no prohibition on voting in different local authority areas, however.

Polling districts were to be delineated and polling places designated by the registration officer. In the absence of other arrangements these were to be identical to those used for parliamentary elections.

=== Part III: Corrupt and illegal practices and other provisions as to election campaigns ===
Part III of the act set new limits for the expenses that candidates were permitted to pay their election agent. In a county constituency this was to be £450, plus 2d for each name in the electoral register; in borough constituencies it was to be £450 plus 1½d for each elector.

Among other restrictions, no supporter of a candidate was permitted to use a motor vehicle to bring an elector to the polls, or to loan or rent such a vehicle to an elector, unless the vehicle was first registered with the returning officer. There was to be a limit of one vehicle per 1,500 electors in a county constituency and 2,500 in a borough constituency. The broadcast of any programme relating to an election on a radio station other than one operated by the British Broadcasting Corporation was also prohibited. This prohibition extended to broadcasters outside the state.

Each candidate was allowed to send an election address to each elector post free, and was entitled to the use of a room in a publicly funded school in which to hold meetings.

=== Part IV: Special provisions as to local elections in England and Wales ===
Part IV altered the dates for the holding of local elections in England and Wales. County councillors were to be elected in the first week of April, and all other councillors in the first week of May. All borough elections were to be held on the same day, set by the Home Secretary. The date for other elections was to be set by the appropriate county council. The change of dates meant that the borough elections due in November 1948 were postponed until the following May. Mayors' and council chairmen's terms of office were extended until the first meeting held after the rescheduled elections.

The constitution of the London County Council was slightly altered: previously two councillors were elected for electoral divisions corresponding to each parliamentary constituency in the County of London, with an additional four for the City of London. With the reorganisation of constituencies in the county by the act, the City lost its special position, being combined with Westminster in a single electoral division.

=== Part V: Special provisions as to local government elections in Scotland ===
The dates for holding local elections in Scotland was also altered:

- Elections for county councillors for landward (Note: "Landward" referred to areas outside a burgh.) areas of counties and for district councillors were to be held on the second Tuesday of May in 1949 and every three years thereafter.
- Burgh councillors were to be elected on the first Tuesday in May 1949 and annually thereafter.
- County councillors representing burghs were to be elected in May 1949 following the council election, and every three years thereafter.

County, district and burgh elections due in 1948 were postponed until 1949, and councillors due to retire were to continue in office. This also applied to county conveners, burgh provosts, honorary treasurers of burghs and chairmen of district councils.

=== Part VI: General ===
The final part of the act listed the duties of the registration officer and established an appeals procedure for persons excluded from the register. It also allowed for funds to be made available for the registration process.

==== Repealed enactments ====
Section 80(7) of the act repealed 85 enactments, listed in the thirteenth schedule to the act.

Citation	Short title	Description	Extent of repeal
5 Ric. 2. Stat. 2. c. 4	Summons to Parliament Act 1382	Everyone shall obey his summons to Parliament. Penalty on sheriffs omitting returns of writs to Parliament.	The words from "and if any sheriff" to the end of the chapter.
34 & 35 Hen. 8. c. 13	Chester and Cheshire (Constituencies) Act 1542	An Acte for Knightes and Burgesses to have places in the Parliment for the Countie Palantyne and Citie of Chestre.	The whole act.
7 & 8 Will. 3. c. 7	Parliamentary Elections (Returns) Act 1695	An Act to prevent false and double returns of members to serve in Parliament.	The whole act except section five, and in section five the words "and for the more easy and better proof of any such false or double return" and the words from "and that the party" to the end of the section.
7 & 8 Will. 3. c. 25	Parliamentary Elections Act 1695	An Act for the further regulating elections of members to serve in parliament, and for the preventing irregular proceedings of sheriffs, and other officers, in the electing and returning such menmobers.	The whole act except section seven, and in section seven the words from the beginning of the section to "any future parliament" where those words first occur.
7 Geo. 2. c. 16	Parliamentary Elections (Scotland) Act 1733	An Act for the better regulating the election of members to serve in the House of Commons for that Part of Great Britain called Scotland and for in- capacitating the Judges of the Court of Session, Court of Justiciary and Barons of: the Court of Ex- chequer in Scotland to be elected or to sit or vote as Members of the House of Com- mons.	Section eight.
32 Geo. 3. c. 63	Scottish Episcopalians Relief Act 1792	The Scottish Episcopalians Relief Act, 1792.	Section seven, and section thirteen so far as relating to incapacity to vote.
60 Geo. 3 & 1 Geo. 4. c. 11	Parliamentary Elections (Ireland) Act 1820	The Parliamentary Elections (Ireland) Act, 1820.	The whole act.
1 & 2 Geo. 4. c. 58	Parliamentary Elections (Ireland) Act 1821	The Parliamentary Elections (Ireland) Act, 1821.	The whole act.
4 Geo. 4. c. 55	Parliamentary Elections (Ireland) Act 1823	The Parliamentary Elections (Ireland) Act, 1823.	The whole act, except section seventy-four.
10 Geo. 4. c. 44	Metropolitan Police Act 1829	The Metropolitan Police Act, 1829.	In section eighteen, the words from "and no justice" to the end of the section.
2 & 3 Will. 4. c. 45	Reform Act 1832	The Reform Act, 1832.	The whole act.
2 & 3 Will. 4. c. 65	Representation of the People (Scotland) Act 1832	The Representation of the People (Scotland) Act, 1832.	Section thirty-one; in section thirty-six the words "to vote or" where those words first occur, and section thirty-eight.
5 & 6 Will. 4. c. 36	Parliamentary Elections Act 1835	The Parliamentary Elections Act, 1835.	The whole act.
5 & 6 Will. 4. c. 78	Representation of the People (Scotland) Act 1835	The Representation of the People (Scotland) Act, 1835.	The whole act.
6 & 7 Will. 4. c. 13	Constabulary (Ireland) Act 1836	The Constabulary (Ireland) Act, 1836.	In section eighteen, the words from "and no inspector-general" to the end of the section.
2 & 3 Vict. c. 93	County Police Act 1839	The County Police Act, 1839.	Section nine.
2 & 3 Vict. c. xciv	City of London Police Act 1839	An Act for regulating the Police in the City of London.	Section eight.
6 & 7 Vict. c. 18	Parliamentary Voters Registration Act 1843	The Parliamentary Voters Registration Act, 1843.	The whole act except sections eighty-five and ninety-three, and in section ninety-three the words "or members".
12 & 13 Vict. c. xciv	City of London Elections Act 1849	An Act to amend an Act passed in the eleventh year of the reign of King In section five the words from ‘and who” to the words “in respect to such premises’’.George the First for regula- ting elections within the City of London and for preserving the peace, good order and government of the said City.	In section five the words from "and who" to the words “in respect to such premises’’.
13 & 14 Vict. c. 68	Parliamentary Electors (Ireland) Act 1850	The Parliamentary Electors (Ireland) Act, 1850.	The whole act.
13 & 14 Vict. c. 69	Representation of the People (Ireland) Act 1850	The Representation of the People (Ireland) Act, 1850.	The whole act, except section ninety-two.
15 & 16 Vict. c. 57	Election Commissioners Act 1852	The Election Commissioners Act, 1852.	In section one, the words "or members" in the second place where they occur.
16 & 17 Vict. c. 15	Parliamentary Elections (Polling) Act 1853	The Parliamentary Elections (Polling) Act, 1853.	The whole act.
16 & 17 Vict. c. 28	County Elections (Scotland) Act 1853	The County Elections (Scotland) Act, 1853.	The whole act.
16 & 17 Vict. c. 68	Parliamentary Elections Act 1853	The Parliamentary Elections Act, 1853.	The whole act.
17 & 18 Vict. c. 102	Corrupt Practices Prevention Act 1854	The Corrupt Practices Prevention Act, 1854.	Sections seven, eight and thirty-five, and in section thirty-eight the definitions of "county", "city or borough", "returning officer" and "revising barrister" and in the definitions of "election" and "voter" the words "or members".
19 & 20 Vict. c. 2	Metropolitan Police Act 1856	The Metropolitan Police Act, 1856.	In section nine, the words "or indirectly interfering therein".
19 & 20 Vict. c. 69	County and Borough Police Act 1856	The County and Borough Police Act, 1856.	Section nine.
20 & 21 Vict. c. 72	Police (Scotland) Act 1857	The Police (Scotland) Act, 1857.	Section seventeen.
23 & 24 Vict. c. 135	Metropolitan Police Act 1860	The Metropolitan Police Act, 1860.	Section five.
25 & 26 Vict. c. 62	County Elections (Ireland) Act 1862	The County Elections (Ireland) Act, 1862.	The whole act.
30 & 31 Vict. c. 102	Representation of the People Act 1867	The Representation of the People Act, 1867.	In section two, the words from "nor in anywise" to the end of the section; section thirty-seven; section forty-nine; section fifty-seven; and in section sixty-one the definitions of "member", "county" and "borough" and in the definition of "election" the words "or members".
31 & 32 Vict. c. 46	Boundary Act 1868	The Boundary Act, 1868.	The whole act.
31 & 32 Vict. c. 48	Representation of the People (Scotland) Act 1868	The Representation of the People (Scotland) Act, 1868.	The whole act, except sections one, two, twenty-three, twenty-eight, twenty-nine and thirty-one to thirty-five and Schedules E. and F.
31 & 32 Vict. c. 49	Representation of the People (Ireland) Act 1868	The Representation of the People (Ireland) Act, 1868.	The whole act except section thirteen.
31 & 32 Vict. c. 58	Parliamentary Electors Registration Act 1868	The Parliamentary Electors Registration Act, 1868.	The whole act.
31 & 32 Vict. c. 125	Parliamentary Elections Act 1868	The Parliamentary Elections Act, 1868.	In sections three and fifty-eight, the definitions of "county" and "borough", and in the definition in section three of "election" the words "or members"; and sections forty-four, forty-eight and forty-nine.
32 & 33 Vict. c. 21	Corrupt Practices Commission Expenses Act 1869	The Corrupt Practices Commission Expenses Act, 1869.	In section two the words "in manner hereinafter mentioned" and sections three to six.
34 & 35 Vict. c. 61	Election Commissioners Expenses Act 1871	The Election Commissioners Expenses Act, 1871.	The whole act.
35 & 36 Vict. c. 33	Ballot Act 1872	The Ballot Act, 1872.	Section one; in section two the words "candidates or" and the words from "Where an equality of votes" to the end of the section; section seven; in section ten the words "and administering the oath" and the words "and administered to"; in section eleven the words from the beginning to "one hundred pounds"; section thirteen; section fourteen; section twenty-four; section twenty-six; in section twenty-seven the words from "and shall apply" to the end of the section; section twenty-nine; section thirty-one; in the First Schedule, rules 1 to 14; rule 18; in rule 22 the words from "contain" to "it shall"; in rule 24 the words "either stamped or perforated"; in rule 26 the words from "the said declaration" where those words first occur to the end of the rule; in rule 27 the words "and taking the oath" and the words "of and to be administered to voters"; in rule 29 the words "and the declarations of inability to read"; in rule 38 the words "declarations of inability to read"; rule 56; in rule 57 the definitions of "district borough" and of "polling place"; rules 60 and 62; in the Second Schedule the forms of writ (including the note) and declaration of inability to read, and in the directions as to printing the ballot paper the words from "The surname" to the last "and"; and the Third Schedule.
38 & 39 Vict. c. 84	Parliamentary Elections (Returning Officers) Act 1875	The Parliamentary Elections (Returning Officers) Act, 1875.	The whole act.
41 & 42 Vict. c. 26	Parliamentary and Municipal Registration Act 1878	The Parliamentary and Municipal Registration Act, 1878.	Sections eleven to thirteen.
41 & 42 Vict. c. 41	Parliamentary Elections Returning Officers' Expenses (Scotland) Act 1878	The Parliamentary Elections Returning Officers' Expenses (Scotland) Act, 1878.	Sections four and five.
43 Vict. c. 18	Parliamentary Elections and Corrupt Practices Act 1880	The Parliamentary Elections and Corrupt Practices Act, 1880.	The whole act.
45 & 46 Vict. c. 50	Municipal Corporations Act 1882	The Municipal Corporations Act, 1882.	In section seven, the definition of "parliamentary borough"; section eighty-one; section eighty-five; and in section one hundred and seventy the words "on the ninth of November" in subsection (1) and the words "at the quarterly meeting of the council" in subsection (2).
46 & 47 Vict. c. 51	Corrupt and Illegal Practices Prevention Act 1883	The Corrupt and Illegal Practices Prevention Act, 1883.	In subsection (1) of section seven, paragraph (c); subsection (1) of section nine; in section sixteen the words "cockades, ribbons, or other marks of distinction"; in subsection (2) of section seventeen the words from "if he knew" to the end of the subsection; in section thirty-three, in subsection (5) the words "to any person who sues for the same"; subsections (2) to (8) of section thirty-nine; subsection (5) of section forty; in subsection (3) of section fifty-three the words "or action"; in subsection (1) of section fifty-eight the words from "and the Election Commissioners Expenses Acts" to the end of the subsection; section sixty-one; subsection (2) of section sixty-three except the words "Provided that where a person has been declared to be a candidate by others without his consent, nothing in this Act shall be construed to impose any liability on such person unless he has afterwards given his assent to such declaration or has been nominated"; in section sixty-four, in the definition of "election" the words "or members"; in section sixty-eight the definition of "revising barrister" and paragraph (b); paragraphs (3) and (4) of section sixty-nine; the First Schedule except paragraph (2) of Part I; the Second Schedule except the form of return in Part I; and in the Third Schedule Part III except so far as relates to sections two and three of the Corrupt Practices Prevention Act, 1854.
47 & 48 Vict. c. 70	Municipal Elections (Corrupt and Illegal Practices) Act 1884	The Municipal Elections (Corrupt and Illegal Practices) Act, 1884.	Paragraph (c) of subsection (1) of section four; subsection (2) of section six, so far as relates to elections of councillors; in section twelve the words "cockades, ribbons, or other marks of distinction"; in subsection (2) of section thirteen, the words from "if he knew" to the end of the subsection; in subsection (1) of section sixteen the word "either" and the words "or for holding a meeting"; section eighteen; in subsection (4) of section twenty-one the words "to any person who sues for the same"; in section twenty-four, the words "in July" in subsection (1) and subsections (2) to (9); in paragraph (a) of section thirty the words "other than a corrupt practice"; the second paragraph of section thirty-four, except as respects the City of London; section thirty-seven; Part I of the Third Schedule so far as it repeats the Representation of the People Act, 1867, s. 49 and the Ballot Act, 1872, s. 24; the Fourth Schedule.
48 & 49 Vict. c. 10	Elections (Hours of Poll) Act 1885	The Election (Hours of Poll) Act, 1885.	The whole act.
48 & 49 Vict. c. 15	Registration Act 1885	The Registration Act, 1885.	The whole act.
48 & 49 Vict. c. 17	Parliamentary Registration (Ireland) Act 1885	The Parliamentary Registration (Ireland) Act, 1885.	The whole act.
48 & 49 Vict. c. 23	Redistribution of Seats Act 1885	The Redistribution of Seats Act, 1885.	The whole act.
50 & 51 Vict. c. 9	Police Disabilities Removal Act 1887	The Police Disabilities Removal Act, 1887.	The whole act.
50 & 51 Vict. c. 55	Sheriffs Act 1887	The Sheriffs Act, 1887.	In section thirty-one the words "and of the law relating to the election of members to serve in Parliament".
52 & 53 Vict. c. 63	Interpretation Act 1889	The Interpretation Act, 1889.	Paragraph (3) of section fifteen, and in paragraph (4) thereof, the words from "and" onwards; and in paragraph (1) of section seventeen the words "or members" and paragraphs (2) and (3) of that section.
53 & 54 Vict. c. 55	Elections (Scotland) (Corrupt and Illegal Practices) Act 1890	The Elections (Scotland) (Corrupt and Illegal Practices) Act, 1890.	Section five; section six; paragraph (c) of subsection (1) of section eight; in section sixteen the words "cockades, ribbons, or other marks of distinction"; in subsection (2) of section seventeen the words from "if he knew" to the end of the subsection; in subsection (1) of section twenty the word "either" and the words "or for holding a meeting"; section twenty-two; section twenty-five; subsections (2) to (6) of section twenty-nine; section fifty-one; the First Schedule except so far as relates to sections two and three of the Corrupt Practices Prevention Act, 1854, and sections one and two of the Corrupt and Illegal Practices Prevention Act, 1883.
54 & 55 Vict. c. 49	Returning Officers (Scotland) Act 1891	The Returning Officers (Scotland) Act, 1891.	Section two from the words "but shall not" to the end of the section, and in section five the words from "of ballot boxes," to "elections and".
56 & 57 Vict. c. 6	Police Disabilities Removal Act 1893	The Police Disabilities Removal Act, 1893.	The whole act.
62 & 63 Vict. c. 14	London Government Act 1899	The London Government Act, 1899.	In subsection (1) of section eleven the words "list of voters and of".
7 Edw. 7. c. 51	Sheriff Courts (Scotland) Act 1907	The Sheriff Courts (Scotland) Act, 1907.	In section twenty-one the words from "nor shall he be entitled" to "within his sheriffdom".
3 & 4 Geo. 5. c. 6	Extension of Polling Hours Act 1913	The Extension of Polling Hours Act, 1913.	The whole act.
7 & 8 Geo. 5. c. 64	Representation of the People Act 1918	The Representation of the People Act, 1918.	The whole act, except sections nineteen and forty-three in so far as they re-enact regulation 16 of section two of the Universities Elections Amendment (Scotland) Act, 1881, and subsection (3) of section twenty-one, and section forty-two and the Sixth Schedule so far as they relate to the Registration Amendment (Scotland) Act, 1885, or to subsection (1) of section twenty-nine of the Elections (Scotland) (Corrupt and Illegal Practices) Act, 1890.
7 & 8 Geo. 5. c. 65	Redistribution of Seats (Ireland) Act 1918	The Redistribution of Seats (Ireland) Act, 1918.	The whole act.
8 & 9 Geo. 5. c. 50	Representation of the People (Amendment) Act 1918	The Representation of the People (Amendment) Act, 1918.	The whole act.
9 & 10 Geo. 5. c. 8	Representation of the People (Returning Officers' Expenses) Act 1919	The Representation of the People (Returning Officers' Expenses) Act, 1919.	The whole act.
10 & 11 Geo. 5. c. 26	Sheriffs (Ireland) Act 1920	The Sheriffs (Ireland) Act, 1920.	In subsection (2) of section two the words "(including his powers and duties as returning officer)".
10 & 11 Geo. 5. c. 35	Representation of the People (No. 2) Act 1920	The Representation of the People (No. 2) Act, 1920.	The whole act.
10 & 11 Geo. 5. c. 67	Government of Ireland Act 1920	The Government of Ireland Act, 1920.	Paragraph (a) of section nineteen; section seventy-one; Part II of the Fifth Schedule.
11 & 12 Geo. 5. c. 34	Representation of the People Act 1921	The Representation of the People Act, 1921.	The whole act.
12 & 13 Geo. 5. c. 12	Representation of the People Act 1922	The Representation of the People Act, 1922.	The whole act.
12 & 13 Geo. 5. c. 31	Universities (Scotland) Act 1922	The Universities (Scotland) Act, 1922.	In section two, the proviso.
12 & 13 Geo. 5. c. 41	Representation of the People (No. 2) Act 1922	The Representation of the People (No. 2) Act, 1922.	The whole act.
16 & 17 Geo. 5. c. 9	Economy (Miscellaneous Provisions) Act 1926	The Economy (Miscellaneous Provisions) Act, 1926.	Part III and the Third Schedule.
18 & 19 Geo. 5. c. 12	Representation of the People (Equal Franchise) Act 1928	The Representation of the People (Equal Franchise) Act, 1928.	The whole act.
18 & 19 Geo. 5. c. 25	Representation of the People (Reading University) Act 1928	The Representation of the People (Reading University) Act, 1928.	The whole act.
23 & 24 Geo. 5. c. 51	Local Government Act 1933	The Local Government Act, 1933.	Section nine; subsection (3) of section twenty-three; in section forty in paragraph (2) of subsection (1) the words "the day of the poll and" and the words from "so" onwards; and in subsection (2) of that section the words "(other than the provisions referred to in section thirty-seven of that Act)"; section fifty-one; in section fifty-four in paragraph (8) of subsection (1) the words "the day of election and the day of the poll and" and the words from "so" onwards, and in subsection (2) of that section the words "(other than the provisions referred to in section thirty-seven of that Act)"; subsection (1) of section seventy; section seventy-nine; sections eighty-two and one hundred and fifty-four; in the Second Schedule, in Part II, columns one and two except the words "Proceeding" and "Time" in the headings and the first and last entries, and the whole of column three; in Part III, sub-paragraph (2) of paragraph 2; sub-paragraphs (2) and (3) of paragraph 4; in sub-paragraph (1) of paragraph 16 the words "by two local government electors or"; in sub-paragraph (1) of paragraph 17 the words from "but the presiding officer" to the end of the sub-paragraph; in paragraph (c) of sub-paragraph (1) of paragraph 20 the words from "in this" onwards; in sub-paragraph (1) of paragraph 22 the words "The declaration of inability to read and" and the words "applies for a ballot paper or" and "as the case may be"; in sub-paragraph (c) of paragraph 26 the words "and the declarations of inability to read"; in paragraph 33, the word "except" and the word "otherwise" where it first occurs; paragraph 37; in paragraph 40 the words "declarations of inability to read"; and in Part IV of the Second Schedule, Form D and in the directions as to printing the ballot paper the words from "The surname" to the last "and"; in the Third Schedule, in Part I, paragraph (a) of sub-paragraph (2) of paragraph 1 and in sub-paragraph (3) of that paragraph the words "before the eighth day of March next following"; in Part II, the words "on each ninth day of November" and the words "before the first day of November next following" in sub-paragraph (2) of paragraph 1; in Part VI, in paragraph 3 the words "and is not a candidate for election thereat" in sub-paragraph (1) and the words "or unable to take the chair at" in sub-paragraph (3), and sub-paragraph (2) of paragraph 4.
2 & 3 Geo. 6. c. 40	London Government Act 1939	The London Government Act, 1939.	Section ten; subsections (2) and (3) of section eleven; section twenty-four; subsection (1) of section forty-five; proviso (a) to subsection (1) of section forty-six; subsection (2) of section fifty; section fifty-three; section fifty-six; in the Second Schedule, in Part I, in paragraph 4 the words from "not later" in sub-paragraph (1) to the end of the paragraph; in sub-paragraph (5) of paragraph 5 the words from "Not" to "election"; in paragraph 7 the words from "not later" onwards; in Part II, sub-paragraph (2) of paragraph 3; sub-paragraphs (1) and (3) of paragraph 14; in sub-paragraph (1) of paragraph 16 the words "by two electors or"; in sub-paragraph (2) of paragraph 17 the words from "but the presiding officer" to the end of the sub-paragraph; in paragraph (c) of sub-paragraph (1) of paragraph 20, the words from "in this" onwards; in sub-paragraph (2) of paragraph 22 the words "The declaration of inability to read and", the word "respectively", the words "Form D and", and the words "applies for a ballot paper or" and "as the case may be"; in sub-paragraph (e) of paragraph 26 the words "and the declarations of inability to read"; in paragraph 33 the word "except", and the word "otherwise" where it first occurs; paragraph 37; in paragraph 40 the words "declarations of inability to read"; and in Part III of the Second Schedule, Form D and in the directions as to printing the ballot paper the words from "The surname" to the last "and"; in the Third Schedule, in Part I, paragraph (a) of sub-paragraph (2) of paragraph 1; in Part II, the words "on the ninth of November" in sub-paragraph (2) of paragraph 1.
6 & 7 Geo. 6. c. 48	Parliament (Elections and Meeting) Act 1943	The Parliament (Elections and Meeting) Act, 1943.	Part I; in section twenty-seven, subsection (7) and in subsection (8) the words from "and the expressions" to the end of the subsection; section twenty-eight; in section thirty, in subsection (2) the words "except in relation to university elections"; in subsection (5) of section thirty-one the words from "in section thirteen," to "1922," the words "or an assistant returning officer," and the words from "and nothing" onwards; subsection (1) of section thirty-three; the First, Second, Fourth and Sixth Schedules.
7 & 8 Geo. 6. c. 24	Parliamentary Electors (War-time Registration) Act 1944	The Parliamentary Electors (War-time Registration) Act, 1944.	The whole act.
7 & 8 Geo. 6. c. 41	House of Commons (Redistribution of Seats) Act 1944	The House of Commons (Redistribution of Seats) Act, 1944.	In section four, in subsection (4), the words "after the submission of their report under the last foregoing section" and in subsections (1) and (3) the words "and the number of members which they recommend should be returned by each of them"; section six; and in the Third Schedule, in rule 2 paragraph (1) and in paragraph (2) the word "other"; rule 3, in sub-paragraph (b)(i) of paragraph (2), and in paragraph (2), in the definition of the expression "county" the words "in sub-paragraph (a)" and the words from "and in sub-paragraph (b)" onwards; rule 7; and in rule 8 in sub-paragraph (a) of paragraph (2) the words from "or in applying these rules" to the end of paragraph (3) of the sub-paragraph, and paragraph (2).
8 & 9 Geo. 6. c. 5	Representation of the People Act 1945	The Representation of the People Act, 1945.	Parts I, II, and IV; in section thirty-three in subsection (3) the words "or any part thereof" and the words from "or that part thereof" to "and"; sections thirty-five to thirty-seven; in section thirty-eight the words from "constituency" to "the same meaning as in that Act"; section thirty-nine; the First, Second and Fourth Schedules.
9 & 10 Geo. 6. c. 21	Elections and Jurors Act 1945	The Elections and Jurors Act, 1945.	The whole act.
10 & 11 Geo. 6. c. 10	House of Commons (Redistribution of Seats) Act 1947	The House of Commons (Redistribution of Seats) Act, 1947.	Section one from the words "(2) For the purposes" in subsection (2) onwards, and the Schedule.
10 & 11 Geo. 6. c. 43	Local Government (Scotland) Act 1947	The Local Government (Scotland) Act, 1947.	In paragraph (b) of the proviso to subsection (2) of section twenty-two, the words from "no person" to "ward. and"; in subsection (2) of section forty-four the words from "and (b) a person" to the end of the subsection; in section fifty-nine, subsection (7); in section sixty-one, in subsection (2) paragraph (a); subsection (1) of section sixty-seven; section sixty-nine; section seventy; in section one hundred and forty-five, paragraph (a); in Part II of the Second Schedule, column 3; in Part III of the Second Schedule, paragraph 3 and sub-paragraphs (1) and (3) of paragraph 14; in sub-paragraph (2) of paragraph 17 the words from "but the presiding officer" to the end of the sub-paragraph; in paragraph (c) of sub-paragraph (1) of paragraph 20, the words from "in this Schedule" onwards; in sub-paragraph (1) of paragraph 22 the words "the declarations of inability to read and"; in sub-paragraph (e) of paragraph 26 the words "and the declarations of inability to read"; paragraph 37; in paragraph 40 the words "declarations of inability to read"; and in Part V of the Second Schedule, Form I, and in the directions as to printing the ballot paper the words from "The surname" to the last "and".
Act of the Irish Parliament
35 Geo. 3. c. 29 (I)	Parliamentary Elections Act 1795	An Act for regulating the election of members to serve in Parliament, and for repealing the several Acts therein mentioned.	The whole act.
Order in Council
SR&O 1922/1352	Government of Ireland (Election Laws Adaptation) (Northern Ireland) Order 1922	The Government of Ireland (Election Laws Adaptation) (Northern Ireland) Order, 1922	In Article 3, sub-paragraphs (a), (b) and (c) of paragraph (1) and paragraph (2).

==== Short title, commencement and extent ====
Section 80(6) of the act provided that part V of the act, and part VI as relates to part V, would come into force on 1 October 1948.

Section 81 of the act provided that the act may be cited as the "Representation of the People Act, 1948" and may be cited as a Representation of the People Act.

== Number of constituencies ==
Schedule I set out the names, number and constitution of the constituencies, which replaced those created by the Representation of the People Act 1918 (7 & 8 Geo. 5. c. 64) and Government of Ireland Act 1920 (10 & 11 Geo. 5. c. 67). In a few counties where there had been an exceptional increase in the electorate since 1918, additional constituencies had been created for the 1945 general election by the House of Commons (Redistribution of Seats) Act 1944 (7 & 8 Geo. 6. c. 41) as a temporary measure.

The changes to constituencies were to be introduced from the next general election, which was held on 23 February 1950. By-elections held before then used the old constituencies.

=== England ===
County	1918 (parliamentary boroughs + county divisions)	1948 (borough constituencies + county constituencies)
Bedfordshire	3 (0 + 3)	4 (1 + 3)
Berkshire	4 (1 + 3)	6 (2 + 4)
Buckinghamshire	3 (0 + 3) (increased to 4 (0 + 4) in 1945)	5 (1 + 4)
Cambridgeshire	2 (1 + 1)	2 (1 + 1)
Cheshire	14 (5 + 9) (increased to 15 (5 + 10) in 1945)	15 (6 + 9)
Cornwall	5 (0 + 5)	5 (0 + 5)
Cumberland	5 (1 + 4)	4 (1 + 3)
Derbyshire	9 (1 + 8)	10 (3 + 7)
Devon	11 (4 + 7)	10 (4 + 6)
Dorset	4 (0 + 4)	4 (1 + 3)
Durham	16 (5 + 11)	18 (8 + 10)
Isle of Ely	1 (0 + 1)	1 (0 + 1)
Essex	20 (12 + 8) (increased to 26 (13 + 13) in 1945)	24 (16 + 8)
Gloucestershire	11 (7 + 4)	12 (8 + 4)
Hampshire	11 (5 + 6)	13 (8 + 5)
Herefordshire	2 (0 + 2)	2 (0 + 2)
Hertfordshire	5 (0 + 5) (increased to 6 (0 + 6) in 1945)	7 (1 + 6)
Huntingdonshire	1 (0 + 1)	1 (0 + 1)
Kent	14 (3 + 11) (increased to 16 (4 + 12) in 1945)	18 (6 + 12)
Lancashire	62 (44 + 18) (Note: Lancashire returned 65 MPs as Blackburn, Bolton, Oldham and Preston returned two members each.) (increased to 63 (45 + 18) in 1945)	64 (48 + 16)
Leicestershire	7 (3 + 4)	8 (4 + 4)
Lincolnshire: Parts of Holland	1 (0 + 1)	1 (0 + 1)
Lincolnshire: Parts of Lindsey	6 (4 + 2)	6 (4 + 2)
Lincolnshire: Parts of Kesteven and Rutland	2 (0 + 2)	2 (0 + 2)
County of London with the City of London	63 (63 + 0) (Note: The County of London with the City of London returned 65 MPs as the City of London elected two members.)	43 (43 + 0)
Middlesex	17 (7 + 10) (increased to 24 (18 + 6) in 1945)	28 (26 + 2)
Norfolk	6 (1 + 2) (Note: Norfolk returned 7 MPs as Norwich returned two members.)	8 (2 + 6)
Northamptonshire and the Soke of Peterborough	5 (1 + 4)	5 (1 + 4)
Northumberland	10 (7 + 3)	10 (7 + 3)
Nottinghamshire	9 (4 + 5)	10 (4 + 6)
Oxfordshire	3 (1 + 2)	3 (1 + 2)
Shropshire	4 (0 + 4)	4 (0 + 4)
Somerset	7 (1 + 6)	7 (1 + 6)
Staffordshire	18 (11 + 7)	18 (12 + 6)
Suffolk	6 (1 + 5)	5 (1 + 4)
Surrey	12 (5 + 7) (increased to 14 (6 + 8) in 1945)	19 (9 + 10)
East Sussex	6 (2 + 4) (Note: East Sussex returned 7 MPs as Brighton returned two members.)	7 (3 + 4)
West Sussex	2 (0 + 2) (increased to 3 (0 + 3) in 1945)	4 (1 + 3)
Warwickshire	17 (13 + 4) (increased to 20 (14 + 6) in 1945)	22 (16 + 6)
Westmorland	1 (0 + 1)	1 (0 + 1)
Isle of Wight	1 (0 + 1)	1 (0 + 1)
Wiltshire	5 (0 + 5)	5 (1 + 4)
Worcestershire	6 (2 + 4)	6 (3 + 3)
Yorkshire: East Riding	7 (4 + 3)	6 (4 + 2)
Yorkshire: North Riding	7 (3 + 4)	6 (2 + 4)
Yorkshire: West Riding	44 (25 + 19)	45 (31 + 14)
York	1 (1 + 0)	1 (1 + 0)
=== Wales and Monmouthshire ===
County	1918 (parliamentary boroughs + county divisions)	1948 (borough constituencies + county constituencies)
Anglesey	1 (0 + 1)	1 (0 + 1)
Brecknockshire and Radnorshire	1 (0 + 1)	1 (0 + 1)
Caernarvonshire	See Carnarvonshire	2 (0 + 2)
Carnarvonshire	2 (1 + 1)	Renamed Caernarvonshire
Cardiganshire	1 (0 + 1)	1 (0 + 1)
Carmarthenshire	2 (0 + 2)	2 (0 + 2)
Denbighshire	2 (0 + 2)	2 (0 + 2)
Flintshire	1 (0 + 1)	2 (0 + 2)
Glamorganshire	16 (9 + 7)	16 (9 + 7)
Merionethshire	1 (0 + 1)	1 (0 + 1)
Monmouthshire	6 (1 + 5)	6 (1 + 5)
Montgomeryshire	1 (0 + 1)	1 (0 + 1)
Pembrokeshire	1 (0 + 1)	1 (0 + 1)
=== Scotland ===
County / counties	1918 (Parliamentary burghs + county divisions)	1948 (Burgh constituencies + county constituencies)
Aberdeenshire	See Aberdeenshire and Kincardineshire	4 (2 + 2)
Aberdeenshire and Kincardineshire	5 (2 + 3) (Note: The Kincardineshire burgh of Inverbervie was included in the Montrose District of Burghs in Forfarshire.)	See Aberdeenshire and Angus and Kincardineshire
Angus and Kincardineshire	See Forfarshire and Aberdeenshire and Kincardineshire	4 (2 + 2)
Argyll	1 (0 + 1)	1 (0 + 1)
Ayrshire and Bute	4 (1 + 3)	5 (0 + 5)
Banffshire	1 (0 + 1)	1 (0 + 1)
Berwickshire and East Lothian	See Berwickshire and Haddingtonshire	1 (0 + 1)
Berwickshire and Haddingtonshire	1 (0 + 1)	Renamed Berwickshire and East Lothian
Caithness and Sutherland	1 (0 + 1)	1 (0 + 1)
Dumfriesshire	1 (0 + 1)	1 (0 + 1)
Dunbartonshire	2 (1 + 1)	2 (0 + 2)
Fife	4 (2 + 2)	4 (2 + 2)
Forfarshire	4 (3 + 1)	Renamed Angus, see Angus and Kincardineshire
Galloway (Kirkcudbrightshire and Wigtownshire)	1 (0 + 1)	1 (0 + 1)
Inverness-shire and Ross and Cromarty	3 (0 + 3)	3 (0 + 3)
Lanarkshire	22 (15 + 7)	22 (16 + 6)
Linlithgowshire	1 (0 + 1)	Renamed West Lothian
Midlothian and Peeblesshire	8 (6 + 2)	8 (7 + 1)
Moray and Nairnshire	1 (0 + 1)	1 (0 + 1)
Orkney and Zetland	1 (0 + 1)	1 (0 + 1)
Perthshire and Kinross-shire	2 (0 + 2)	2 (0 + 2)
Renfrewshire	4 (2 + 2)	4 (2 + 2)
Roxburghshire and Selkirkshire	1 (0 + 1)	1 (0 + 1)
Stirlingshire and Clackmannanshire	3 (1 + 2)	3 (1 + 2)
West Lothian	See Linlithgowshire	1 (0 + 1)
=== Northern Ireland ===
County / counties	1918 (parliamentary boroughs + county divisions)	1948 (borough constituencies + county constituencies)
Antrim, Armagh, Down, Fermanagh, Londonderry and Tyrone	20 (1 + 19); Reduced to 8 (0 + 8) in 1920	8 (0 + 8)
County Borough of Belfast	9 (9 + 0) Reduced to 4 (4 + 0) in 1920	4 (4 + 0)

== Subsequent developments ==
Sections 19 and 43 of the act were repealed by section 206 of, and part I of schedule 9 to, the Representation of the People Act 1983, which came into force on 15 March 1983.

The whole act, except sections 1(1) and 81, was repealed by section 1(1) of, and part X of schedule 1 to, the Statute Law (Repeals) Act 1986, which came into force on 2 May 1986.

Sections 1(1) and 81 of the act were repealed by were repealed by section 8(1) of, and schedule 4 to the Parliamentary Constituencies Act 1986, which came into force on 7 February 1987.
