= Boundaries Scotland =

Independent body in Scotland

Boundaries Scotland is an independent body in Scotland created as the Local Government Boundary Commission for Scotland under the Local Government (Scotland) Act 1973. According to its website, it is responsible for: carrying out reviews of boundaries of local authority areas; reviews of electoral arrangements for local authorities; responding to requests for ad hoc reviews of electoral or administrative arrangements; and reviews of constituencies and regions for the Scottish Parliament. Its work relates to the local government of Scotland, and it reports to the Scottish Government. Its counterpart organisations elsewhere in the UK are the Local Government Boundary Commission for England, the Democracy and Boundary Commission Cymru (Wales) and the Local Government Boundaries Commissioner for Northern Ireland.

The Boundary Commission for Scotland is a separate body, concerned with the boundaries of UK parliament constituencies in Scotland.

When section 28 of the Scottish Elections (Reform) Act 2020 came into force, the Local Government Boundary Commission for Scotland was renamed Boundaries Scotland.

== Electoral reviews ==
In 2006, the Commission completed its Fourth Statutory Review of Electoral Arrangements, as required by the Local Governance (Scotland) Act 2004, producing new wards for use in single transferable vote elections which each return 3 or 4 councillors. These were first used in elections in 2007. The review resulted in a total of 353 wards across Scotland, returning a total of 1222 councillors. A subsequent interim review in 2011 did not change any ward boundaries, but increased the number of councilors to 1223 from May 2012. A fifth review in 2016 resulted in ward boundaries being changed yet again, though some of the proposed were not implemented, such as in Argyll and Bute.

The Commission's Third Statutory Review of Electoral Arrangements reported during 1998 and recommended the electoral arrangements for the unitary local authorities introduced in 1996. The Commission's Second Review reported between 1992 and 1994, and its Initial Review between 1977 and 1979: both concerned the Region and District local government structure that was then in place.

== Administrative area reviews ==
The Commission has conducted a series of reviews of local authority areas to address situations where development has taken place across local authority boundaries, or where local authority areas established by the 1973 Act did not reflect local preferences. In the words of the 1973 Act, the Commission's recommendations are made "in the interests of effective and convenient local government". Since the establishment of Scotland's current 32 unitary councils in 1996, the Commission has conducted 7 such reviews each of which resulted in small changes to the boundaries of authorities to avoid bisecting developed areas.

The 1973 Act gives the Commission powers to conduct wide-ranging reviews of local authority structures in Scotland. However, throughout its existence, Ministers have directed the Commission not to conduct such reviews.
