= Local Government Boundaries Commissioner for Northern Ireland =

Northern Irish local government boundary body

The Local Government Boundaries Commissioner for Northern Ireland is a Northern Ireland Executive sponsored body, responsible for defining local government boundaries.

The commission was established originally as the Local Government Boundaries Commission to keep under review all local government areas in Northern Ireland, and the electoral arrangements for the districts, and to make such proposals to the Northern Ireland Executive as seem desirable in the interests of effective and convenient local government. The name of the commission was changed in 2008 to the Local Government Boundaries Commission for Northern Ireland, as a result of the Local Government (Boundaries) Act (Northern Ireland) 2008.

In 2012 the Minister for the Environment issued Directions to the commission to begin an Electoral Review across all the 26 local authorities in Northern Ireland.

Currently the sponsor department is the Department for Communities.

== See also ==
- Local Government Boundary Commission for England
- Democracy and Boundary Commission Cymru
- Boundaries Scotland
