= Parliamentary Elections (Ireland) Act 1823 =

Act of the Parliament of the United Kingdom

Parliamentary Elections (Ireland) Act 1823 (Note: The citation of this act by this short title was authorised by section 1 of, and the first schedule to, the Short Titles Act 1896. Due to the repeal of those provisions it is now authorised by section 19(2) of the Interpretation Act 1978.)
- Act of Parliament
- Parliament of the United Kingdom
- Long title: An Act to consolidate and amend the several Acts now in force so far as the same relate to the Election and Return of Members to serve in Parliament for Counties of Cities and Counties of Towns in Ireland.
- Citation: 4 Geo. 4. c. 55
- Territorial extent: United Kingdom

Dates
- Royal assent: 8 July 1823
- Commencement: 8 July 1823 (Note: The Acts of Parliament (Commencement) Act 1793.)
- Repealed: England and Wales and Scotland: 1 January 2007; Northern Ireland: 7 February 2007
Other legislation
Amends	See § Repealed enactments
Repeals/revokes	See § Repealed enactments
Amended by	Corrupt Practices Prevention Act 1854
Repealed by	Representation of the People Act 1948; Electoral Administration Act 2006
Relates to	Parliamentary Elections (Ireland) Act 1820; Parliamentary Elections (Ireland) Act 1821

Status: Repealed

Text of statute as originally enacted

Revised text of statute as amended

The Parliamentary Elections (Ireland) Act 1823 (4 Geo. 4. c. 55) was an act of the Parliament of the United Kingdom that consolidated enactments related to parliamentary elections in Ireland.

== Provisions ==
=== Repealed enactments ===
Section 1 of the act repealed 4 enactments, listed in that section.

Citation	Short title	Description	Extent of repeal
35 Geo. 3. c. 29 (I)	Parliamentary Elections Act 1795	An Act, passed in the Parliament of Ireland in the Thirty-fifth Year of the Reign of His late Majesty King George the Third, intituled An Act for regulating the Election of Members to serve in Parliament, and for repealing the several Acts therein mentioned.	As relate to the Election of Members to serve in Parliament for any County of a City or County of a Town.
37 Geo. 3. c. (I)	Parliamentary Elections Act 1797	An Act, passed in the Thirty-seventh Year of the Reign of King George the Third, intituled An Act for the further Regulation of the Election of Members to serve in Parliament.	As relate to the Election of Members to serve in Parliament for any County of a City or County of a Town.
45 Geo. 3. c. 59	Parliamentary Elections (Ireland) Act 1805	An Act, passed in the Forty-fifth Year of the Reign of King George the Third, intituled An Act for amending an Act passed in the Parliament of Ireland, in the Thirty-fifth Year of His present Majesty, for regulating the Election of Members to serve in Parliament, so far as relates to Freeholds under the yearly Value of Twenty Pounds, and for making further and other Regulations relating thereto.	As relate to the Election of Members to serve in Parliament for any County of a City or County of a Town.
60 Geo. 3. & 1 Geo. 4. c. 11	Parliamentary Elections (Ireland) Act 1820	An Act, passed in the First Year of the Reign of King George the Fourth, intituled An Act for the better Regulation of Polls, and for making further Provision touching the Election of Members to serve in Parliament for Ireland, as relate to the Election of Members to serve in Parliament for any County of a City or County of a Town.	As relate to the Election of Members to serve in Parliament for any County of a City or County of a Town.

== Subsequent developments ==
Sections 48, 79 and 81 of the act were repealed by section 1 of, and schedule A to, the Corrupt Practices Prevention Act 1854 (17 & 18 Vict. c. 102), which came into force on 10 August 1854.

The whole act, except section 74, was repealed by section 80(7) of, and the thirteenth schedule to, the Representation of the People Act 1948 (11 & 12 Geo. 6. c. 65), which came into force on 30 July 1948.

Section 74 of the act was repealed by section 74(2) of, and schedule 2 to, the Electoral Administration Act 2006, which came into force in England and Wales and Scotland on 1 January 2007 and Northern Ireland on 7 February 2007.
