= List of acts of the Parliament of the United Kingdom from 1943 =

This is a complete list of acts of the Parliament of the United Kingdom for the year 1943.

Note that the first parliament of the United Kingdom was held in 1801; parliaments between 1707 and 1800 were either parliaments of Great Britain or of Ireland. For acts passed up until 1707, see the list of acts of the Parliament of England and the list of acts of the Parliament of Scotland. For acts passed from 1707 to 1800, see the list of acts of the Parliament of Great Britain. See also the list of acts of the Parliament of Ireland.

For acts of the devolved parliaments and assemblies in the United Kingdom, see the list of acts of the Scottish Parliament, the list of acts of the Northern Ireland Assembly, and the list of acts and measures of Senedd Cymru; see also the list of acts of the Parliament of Northern Ireland.

The number shown after each act's title is its chapter number. Acts passed before 1963 are cited using this number, preceded by the year(s) of the reign during which the relevant parliamentary session was held; thus the Union with Ireland Act 1800 is cited as "39 & 40 Geo. 3. c. 67", meaning the 67th act passed during the session that started in the 39th year of the reign of George III and which finished in the 40th year of that reign. Note that the modern convention is to use Arabic numerals in citations (thus "41 Geo. 3" rather than "41 Geo. III"). Acts of the last session of the Parliament of Great Britain and the first session of the Parliament of the United Kingdom are both cited as "41 Geo. 3". Acts passed from 1963 onwards are simply cited by calendar year and chapter number.

== 6 & 7 Geo. 6 ==
Continuing the eighth session of the 37th Parliament of the United Kingdom, which met from 11 November 1942 until 23 November 1943.

This session was also traditionally cited as 6 & 7 G. 6.

=== Public general acts ===
Short title	Citation	Royal assent
Long title
Consolidated Fund (No. 1) Act 1943 (repealed)	6 & 7 Geo. 6. c. 4	4 February 1943
An Act to apply certain sums out of the Consolidated Fund to the service of the years ending on the thirty-first day of March, one thousand nine hundred and forty-three and one thousand nine hundred and forty-four. (Repealed by Statute Law Revision Act 1950 (14 Geo. 6. c. 6))
Minister of Town and Country Planning Act 1943 (repealed)	6 & 7 Geo. 6. c. 5	4 February 1943
An Act to make provision in connection with the appointment of a Minister of Town and Country Planning; to provide for the transfer to that Minister of certain statutory functions; and to provide for the establishment of statutory Commissions for the purpose of exercising such functions in relation to the use and development of land in England and Wales as may hereafter be determined. (Repealed by Statute Law (Repeals) Act 1989 (c. 43))
Workmen's Compensation Act 1943 (repealed)	6 & 7 Geo. 6. c. 6	4 February 1943
An Act to extend section forty-seven of the Workmen's Compensation Act, 1925, (Note: Workmen's Compensation Act 1925 (15 & 16 Geo. 5. c. 84)) to workmen suffering from pneumoconiosis and to provide for the payment of benefit in the case of such workmen; to enable the Treasury to contribute to certain medical expenses; to amend certain provisions of the Coal Mines Act, 1911, (Note: Coal Mines Act 1911 (1 & 2 Geo. 5. c. 50)) relating to siliceous rock; to amend the provisions of the Workmen's Compensation Acts, 1925 to 1941, relating to certain dependants, to payments in the case of incapacity, to examining surgeons and to the making of rules of court; to provide for the repayment of certain sums paid to dependants of seamen by the Minister of Pensions; and for purposes connected with the matters aforesaid. (Repealed by Statute Law (Repeals) Act 1989 (c. 43))
Crown Lands Act 1943 (repealed)	6 & 7 Geo. 6. c. 7	4 February 1943
An Act to make the Secretary of State for Scotland a Commissioner of Crown Lands. (Repealed by Crown Estate Act 1956 (4 & 5 Eliz. 2. c. 73))
Police (Appeals) Act 1943 (repealed)	6 & 7 Geo. 6. c. 8	11 March 1943
An Act to extend to members of police forces who are punished by reduction in rank or in rate of pay the rights of appeal granted by the Police (Appeals) Act, 1927. (Note: Police (Appeals) Act 1927 (17 & 18 Geo. 5. c. 19)) (Repealed by Police Act 1964 (c. 48))
Universities and Colleges (Trusts) Act 1943	6 & 7 Geo. 6. c. 9	11 March 1943
An Act to make provision as to trust property held by or on behalf of certain universities and colleges or for purposes connected with those universities and colleges.
House of Commons Disqualification (Temporary Provisions) Act 1943 (repealed)	6 & 7 Geo. 6. c. 10	11 March 1943
An Act to continue the House of Commons Disqualification (Temporary Provisions) Act, 1941. (Note: House of Commons Disqualification (Temporary Provisions) Act 1941 (4 & 5 Geo. 6. c. 8)) (Repealed by Statute Law Revision Act 1953 (2 & 3 Eliz. 2. c. 5))
Consolidated Fund (No. 2) Act 1943 (repealed)	6 & 7 Geo. 6. c. 11	25 March 1943
An Act to apply certain sums out of the Consolidated Fund to the service of the years ending on the thirty-first day of March, one thousand nine hundred and forty-three and one thousand nine hundred and forty-four. (Repealed by Statute Law Revision Act 1950 (14 Geo. 6. c. 6))
War Damage (Amendment) Act 1943 (repealed)	6 & 7 Geo. 6. c. 12	25 March 1943
An Act to amend subsection (1) of section four of the War Damage Act, 1941, (Note: War Damage Act 1941 (4 & 5 Geo. 6. c. 12)) and to make consequential amendments; and to supply certain omissions from the provisions enacted by that Act and the War Damage (Amendment) Act, 1942, (Note: War Damage (Amendment) Act 1942 (5 & 6 Geo. 6. c. 28)) as to rentcharges. (Repealed by War Damage Act 1943 (6 & 7 Geo. 6. c. 21))
National Loans Act 1943 (repealed)	6 & 7 Geo. 6. c. 13	22 April 1943
An Act to extend the powers of the Treasury to raise money under section one of the National Loans Act, 1939. (Note: National Loans Act 1939 (2 & 3 Geo. 6. c. 117)) (Repealed by National Loans Act 1968 (c. 13))
British Nationality and Status of Aliens Act 1943 (repealed)	6 & 7 Geo. 6. c. 14	22 April 1943
An Act to amend the law relating to the nationality of children born abroad of British fathers; to make special provision for the naturalization of persons rendering service in connection with the present war; to restrict the making of declarations of alienage in time of war; and to extend the power to make regulations under section nineteen of the British Nationality and Status of Aliens Act 1914. (Note: British Nationality and Status of Aliens Act 1914 (4 & 5 Geo. 5. c. 17)) (Repealed by British Nationality Act 1948 (11 & 12 Geo. 6. c. 56))
Army and Air Force (Annual) Act 1943 (repealed)	6 & 7 Geo. 6. c. 15	22 April 1943
An Act to provide, during twelve months, for the discipline and regulation of the Army and the Air Force. (Repealed by Statute Law Revision Act 1950 (14 Geo. 6. c. 6), Statute Law Revision Act 1953 (2 & 3 Eliz. 2. c. 5) and Revision of the Army and Air Force Acts (Transitional Provisions) Act 1955 (3 & 4 Eliz. 2. c. 20))
Agriculture (Miscellaneous Provisions) Act 1943	6 & 7 Geo. 6. c. 16	22 April 1943
An Act to amend the law relating to agriculture, agricultural land and the drainage of land, and to amend the Corn Returns Act, 1882. (Note: Corn Returns Act 1882 (45 & 46 Vict. c. 37))
Nurses Act 1943 (repealed)	6 & 7 Geo. 6. c. 17	22 April 1943
An Act to provide for the enrolment of assistant nurses for the sick, to restrict the use of the name or title of nurse, to regulate agencies for the supply of nurses for the sick and to amend the Nurses Registration Act, 1919. (Note: Nurses Registration Act 1919 (9 & 10 Geo. 5. c. 94)) (Repealed by Nurses Act 1949 (12, 13 & 14 Geo. 6. c. 73), Nurses Act 1957 (5 & 6 Eliz. 2. c. 15) and Nurses Agencies Act 1957 (5 & 6 Eliz. 2. c. 16))
Evidence and Powers of Attorney Act 1943	6 & 7 Geo. 6. c. 18	22 April 1943
An Act to amend the Evidence and Powers of Attorney Act, 1940, (Note: Evidence and Powers of Attorney Act 1940 (3 & 4 Geo. 6. c. 28)) to provide for the proof of notarial acts of certain foreign, diplomatic and consular representatives, and for purposes connected therewith.
Courts (Emergency Powers) Act 1943 (repealed)	6 & 7 Geo. 6. c. 19	22 April 1943
An Act to consolidate the Courts (Emergency Powers) Acts, 1939 to 1942, and certain enactments relating to the possession of mortgaged land. (Repealed by Statute Law Revision Act 1950 (14 Geo. 6. c. 6) and Statute Law Revision Act 1953 (2 & 3 Eliz. 2. c. 5))
Consolidated Fund (No. 3) Act 1943 (repealed)	6 & 7 Geo. 6. c. 20	3 June 1943
An Act to apply a sum out of the Consolidated Fund to the service of the year ending on the thirty-first day of March, one thousand nine hundred and forty-four. (Repealed by Statute Law Revision Act 1950 (14 Geo. 6. c. 6))
War Damage Act 1943 (repealed)	6 & 7 Geo. 6. c. 21	3 June 1943
An Act to consolidate the War Damage Act, 1941, the War Damage (Amendment) Act, 1942, and the War Damage (Amendment) Act, 1943 (Note: War Damage (Amendment) Act 1943 (6 & 7 Geo. 6. c. 12)) (other than provisions thereof for amending the War Risks Insurance Act, 1939). (Note: War Risks Insurance Act 1939 (2 & 3 Geo. 6. c. 57)) (Repealed by Statute Law (Repeals) Act 1981 (c. 19))
Housing (Agricultural Population) (Scotland) Act 1943 (repealed)	6 & 7 Geo. 6. c. 22	3 June 1943
An Act to extend the time within which applications for assistance under the Housing (Agricultural Population) (Scotland) Act, 1938, may be made to local authorities. (Repealed by Housing (Scotland) Act 1950 (14 Geo. 6. c. 34))
Railway Freight Rebates Act 1943 (repealed)	6 & 7 Geo. 6. c. 23	10 June 1943
An Act to provide for the suspension of the rebates from railway charges in respect of certain coal, coke and patent fuel traffics allowable under the Eleventh Schedule to the Local Government Act, 1929, (Note: Local Government Act 1929 (19 & 20 Geo. 5. c. 17)) for the payment to the Minister of Fuel and Power out of the fund established under that Schedule of amounts corresponding to the amounts of the suspended rebates, for consequential adjustments as to review of the rates of those rebates and of the rebates so allowable in respect of certain agricultural traffics and as to the disposal of certain balances in the said fund and certain credits and liabilities thereof; and for purposes connected with the matters aforesaid. (Repealed by Transport Charges &c. (Miscellaneous Provisions) Act 1954 (2 & 3 Eliz. 2. c. 64))
Catering Wages Act 1943 (repealed)	6 & 7 Geo. 6. c. 24	10 June 1943
An Act to make provision for regulating the remuneration and conditions of employment of catering and other workers and, in connection therewith, for their health and welfare and the general improvement and development of the industries in which they are employed. (Repealed by Terms and Conditions of Employment Act 1959 (7 & 8 Eliz. 2. c. 26))
Settled Land and Trustee Acts (Court's General Powers) Act 1943	6 & 7 Geo. 6. c. 25	6 July 1943
An Act to Extend temporarily the powers of the court under section sixty-four of the Settled Land Act, 1925, (Note: Settled Land Act 1925 (15 & 16 Geo. 5. c. 18)) and section fifty-seven of the Trustee Act, 1925; (Note: Trustee Act 1925 (15 & 16 Geo. 5. c. 19)) and to amend the first-mentioned section as respects improvements.
Telegraph Act 1943 (repealed)	6 & 7 Geo. 6. c. 26	6 July 1943
An Act to increase the maximum rate for ordinary written telegrams. (Repealed by Telegraph Act 1951 (14 & 15 Geo. 6. c. 37))
Pensions and Determination of Needs Act 1943 (repealed)	6 & 7 Geo. 6. c. 27	6 July 1943
An Act to amend the law with respect to the treatment of capital assets and superannuation payments for the purpose of determination of needs, with respect to the relief, maintenance and assistance of members of a household under the Poor Law Acts and Blind Persons Acts and with respect to supplementary pensions, and to amend the Old Age Pensions Act, 1936, (Note: Old Age Pensions Act 1936 (26 Geo. 5 & 1 Edw. 8. c. 31)) as respects the calculation of the means of blind persons and reciprocity with the Isle of Man. (Repealed by Ministry of Social Security Act 1966 (c. 20))
Finance Act 1943	6 & 7 Geo. 6. c. 28	22 July 1943
An Act to grant certain duties, to alter other duties, and to amend the law relating to the Public Revenue and the National Debt, and to make further provision in connection with Finance.
Town and Country Planning (Interim Development) Act 1943 (repealed)	6 & 7 Geo. 6. c. 29	22 July 1943
An Act to bring under planning control land which is not subject to a scheme or resolution under the Town and Country Planning Act, 1932, (Note: Town and Country Planning Act 1932 (22 & 23 Geo. 5. c. 48)) to secure more effective control of development pending the coming into operation of planning schemes, and for purposes connected with the matters aforesaid. (Repealed by Town and Country Planning Act 1947 (10 & 11 Geo. 6. c. 51))
British North America Act 1943	6 & 7 Geo. 6. c. 30	22 July 1943
An Act to provide for the readjustment of the representation of the provinces in the House of Commons of Canada consequent on the decennial census taken in the year one thousand nine hundred and forty-one.
Appropriation Act 1943 (repealed)	6 & 7 Geo. 6. c. 31	5 August 1943
An Act to apply certain sums out of the Consolidated Fund to the service of the years ending on the thirty-first day of March, one thousand nine hundred and forty-two and one thousand nine hundred and forty-four, and to appropriate the Supplies granted in this Session of Parliament. (Repealed by Statute Law Revision Act 1950 (14 Geo. 6. c. 6))
Hydro-Electric Development (Scotland) Act 1943 (repealed)	6 & 7 Geo. 6. c. 32	5 August 1943
An Act to provide for the establishment of a Board for the development of supplies of electricity in the North of Scotland; to authorise the Board to generate and supply electricity and for purposes connected with the matters aforesaid. (Repealed by Electricity Act 1989 (c. 29))
Nurses (Scotland) Act 1943 (repealed)	6 & 7 Geo. 6. c. 33	5 August 1943
An Act to make provision in Scotland for the enrolment of assistant nurses for the sick, for the restriction of the use of the name or title of nurse, and for the regulation of agencies for the supply of nurses for the sick, and to amend the Nurses Registration (Scotland) Act, 1919. (Note: Nurses Registration (Scotland) Act 1919 (9 & 10 Geo. 5. c. 95)) (Repealed by Nurses (Scotland) Act 1951 (14 & 15 Geo. 6. c. 55))
Restriction of Ribbon Development (Temporary Development) Act 1943 (repealed)	6 & 7 Geo. 6. c. 34	5 August 1943
An Act to authorise the making of arrangements during the present war period for enabling development which is expedient in the public interest to be carried out and maintained for the time being notwithstanding the refusal of consent under the Restriction of Ribbon Development Act, 1935, (Note: Restriction of Ribbon Development Act 1935 (25 & 26 Geo. 5. c. 47)) to permanent development; to regulate the effect of temporary arrangements already made for the purposes of that Act during the said period; and to amend section eleven of that Act. (Repealed for England and Wales by Town and Country Planning Act 1947 (10 & 11 Geo. 6. c. 51) and for Scotland by Town and Country Planning (Scotland) Act 1947 (10 & 11 Geo. 6. c. 53))
Foreign Service Act 1943 (repealed)	6 & 7 Geo. 6. c. 35	5 August 1943
An Act to make further provision as respects the superannuation benefits of members of His Majesty's foreign service, and to make such amendments of enactments as are consequential on the establishment and reorganization of that service. (Repealed by Superannuation Act 1965 (c. 74))
Emergency Powers (Isle of Man Defence) Act 1943 (repealed)	6 & 7 Geo. 6. c. 36	5 August 1943
An Act to extend, in relation to persons in the Isle of Man, the powers which may be exercised by His Majesty under the Emergency Powers (Defence) Acts, 1939 (Note: Emergency Powers (Defence) Act 1939 (2 & 3 Geo. 6. c. 62)) and 1940. (Note: Emergency Powers (Defence) Act 1940 (3 & 4 Geo. 6. c. 20)) (Repealed by Statute Law Revision Act 1963 (c. 30))
Isle of Man (Customs) Act 1943 (repealed)	6 & 7 Geo. 6. c. 37	5 August 1943
An Act to amend the law with respect to customs in the Isle of Man. (Repealed by Isle of Man (Customs) Act 1948 (11 & 12 Geo. 6. c. 61))
Coal Act 1943	6 & 7 Geo. 6. c. 38	5 August 1943
An Act to amend the Coal Act, 1938, (Note: Coal Act 1938 (1 & 2 Geo. 6. c. 52)) and dissolve the Coal Mines National Industrial Board.
Pensions Appeal Tribunals Act 1943	6 & 7 Geo. 6. c. 39	5 August 1943
An Act to provide for the bringing of appeals against the rejection by the Minister of Pensions on certain grounds of claims in respect of incapacity for work, disablement or death arising out of the war and against certain other decisions of the Minister of Pensions affecting awards in respect of such claims; to give a statutory right to sums payable under such awards; and for purposes connected with the matters aforesaid.
Law Reform (Frustrated Contracts) Act 1943	6 & 7 Geo. 6. c. 40	5 August 1943
An Act to amend the law relating to the frustration of contracts.
Appropriation (No. 2) Act 1943 (repealed)	6 & 7 Geo. 6. c. 41	11 November 1943
An Act to apply a sum out of the Consolidated Fund to the service of the year ending on the thirty-first day of March, one thousand nine hundred and forty-four, and to appropriate the further Supplies granted in this Session of Parliament. (Repealed by Statute Law Revision Act 1950 (14 Geo. 6. c. 6))
Regency Act 1943	6 & 7 Geo. 6. c. 42	11 November 1943
An Act to amend the law as to the delegation of royal functions to Counsellors of State.
Town and Country Planning (Interim Development) (Scotland) Act 1943 (repealed)	6 & 7 Geo. 6. c. 43	11 November 1943
An Act to bring under planning control land in Scotland which is not subject to a scheme or resolution under the Town and Country Planning (Scotland) Act, 1932; (Note: Town and Country Planning (Scotland) Act 1932 (22 & 23 Geo. 5. c. 49)) to secure more effective control of development in Scotland pending the coming into operation of planning schemes; to provide for the transfer to the Secretary of State of certain statutory functions; and for purposes connected with the matters aforesaid. (Repealed by Statute Law (Repeals) Act 1989 (c. 43))
Rent of Furnished Houses Control (Scotland) Act 1943 (repealed)	6 & 7 Geo. 6. c. 44	11 November 1943
An Act to make provision with regard to the rent of houses or parts thereof in Scotland let at a rent which includes payment for the use of furniture or for services. (Repealed by Rent (Scotland) Act 1971 (c. 28))
Income Tax (Employments) Act 1943 (repealed)	6 & 7 Geo. 6. c. 45	11 November 1943
An Act to amend the law relating to income tax in respect of certain emoluments. (Repealed by Income Tax Act 1952 (15 & 16 Geo. 6 & 1 Eliz. 2. c. 10))
Prolongation of Parliament Act 1943 (repealed)	6 & 7 Geo. 6. c. 46	11 November 1943
An Act to extend the duration of the present Parliament and to provide for the extension of the duration of the House of Commons of Northern Ireland. (Repealed by Statute Law Revision Act 1950 (14 Geo. 6. c. 6))
Price Control (Regulation of Disposal of Stocks) Act 1943 (repealed)	6 & 7 Geo. 6. c. 47	11 November 1943
An Act to enable traders to regulate the disposal of their stocks of certain descriptions of goods to which section nine of the Goods and Services (Price Control) Act, 1941, (Note: Goods and Services (Price Control) Act 1941 (4 & 5 Geo. 6. c. 31)) applies in accordance with licences issued by the Board of Trade with a view to the efficient prosecution of the war and the maintenance of essential supplies. (Repealed by Statute Law Revision Act 1953 (2 & 3 Eliz. 2. c. 5))
Parliament (Elections and Meeting) Act 1943 or the Parliamentary Electors (War-Time Registration) Act 1943	6 & 7 Geo. 6. c. 48	11 November 1943
An Act to make temporary provision as respects parliamentary elections and the registration of parliamentary electors and, in connection therewith, as respects the dissolution of parliament as from a future date and other matters; to consolidate and amend the law as to the officers to whom writs for parliamentary elections are to be directed, and the persons to whom and the manner in which they are to be conveyed; and to shorten the time required for summoning parliament when prorogued.
Workmen's Compensation (Temporary Increases) Act 1943 (repealed)	6 & 7 Geo. 6. c. 49	11 November 1943
An Act to increase temporarily the supplementary allowances payable to workmen entitled to weekly payments by way of compensation under the Workmen's Compensation Act, 1925, and the compensation payable under that Act on the death of workmen; and for purposes connected with the matters aforesaid. (Repealed by National Insurance (Industrial Injuries) Act 1946 (9 & 10 Geo. 6. c. 62))

=== Local acts ===
Short title	Citation	Royal assent
Long title
Clydebank and District Water Order Confirmation Act 1943	6 & 7 Geo. 6. c. ii	11 March 1943
An Act to confirm a Provisional Order under the Private Legislation Procedure (Scotland) Act 1936 (Note: Private Legislation Procedure (Scotland) Act 1936 (26 Geo. 5 & 1 Edw. 8. c. 52)) relating to Clydebank and District Water.
	Clydebank and District Water Order 1943 Provisional Order to authorise the Clydebank and District Water Trustees to construct a compensation water reservoir and other works and to acquire lands to enact new provisions in respect of the compensation water now given from the Burn Crooks reservoir of the Trustees to authorise the Trustees to borrow further money and for other purposes.	
Liverpool Hydraulic Power Act 1943	6 & 7 Geo. 6. c. iii	22 April 1943
An Act to vary the powers of charge of the Liverpool Hydraulic Power Company to modify existing agreements and for other purposes.
Sunderland Corporation Act 1943 (repealed)	6 & 7 Geo. 6. c. iv	3 June 1943
An Act to extend the time within which the mayor aldermen and burgesses of the county borough of Sunderland may advance money on loan to the River Wear Commissioners and guarantee the re-payment of and the payment of interest upon money borrowed or to be borrowed by the said commissioners to authorise any such advances or guarantees made or given between the thirty-first day of December nineteen hundred and forty-two and the passing of this Act to extend the time limited for the compulsory purchase of lands authorised by the Sunderland Corporation Act 1935 (Note: Sunderland Corporation Act 1935 (25 & 26 Geo. 5. c. cxxv)) and the Sunderland Corporation Act 1939 (Note: Sunderland Corporation Act 1939 (2 & 3 Geo. 6. c. lxvi)) and the completion of certain tramways authorised by the first named Act and for other purposes. (Repealed by Tyne and Wear Act 1980 (c. xliii))
Grand Union Canal Act 1943	6 & 7 Geo. 6. c. v	6 July 1943
An Act to make better provision for regulating the capital of the Grand Union Canal Company and the administration of their affairs to confer further powers on the Company and for other purposes.
Bridgwater Gas Act 1943	6 & 7 Geo. 6. c. vi	6 July 1943
An Act to confer further powers upon the Bridgwater Gas Light Company and for other purposes.
Greenock Port and Harbours Order Confirmation Act 1943	6 & 7 Geo. 6. c. vii	22 July 1943
An Act to confirm a Provisional Order under the Private Legislation Procedure (Scotland) Act 1936 relating to Greenock Port and Harbours.
	Greenock Port and Harbours Order 1943 Provisional Order to authorise the Trustees of the Port and Harbours of Greenock to create a fund for the execution of certain works of replacement renewal and improvement to provide for modifying the interest on the "B" deferred debenture stock to confer further rating and charging powers on the Trustees and for other purposes.	
Provisional Order (Marriages) Confirmation Act 1943 (repealed)	6 & 7 Geo. 6. c. viii	22 July 1943
An Act to confirm a Provisional Order made by one of. His Majesty's Principal Secretaries of State under the Marriages Validity (Provisional Orders) Acts 1905 (Note: Provisional Order (Marriages) Act 1905 (5 Edw. 7. c. 23)) and 1924. (Note: Marriages Validity (Provisional Orders) Act 1924 (14 & 15 Geo. 5. c. 20)) (Repealed by Statute Law (Repeals) Act 1977 (c. 18))
	Catton Chapel of East Croxall Order.	
Ministry of Health Provisional Order Confirmation (Bucks Water Board) Act 1943	6 & 7 Geo. 6. c. ix	22 July 1943
An Act to confirm a Provisional Order of the Minister of Health relating to Bucks Water Board.
	Bucks Water Order 1943 Provisional Order altering a local Act (Note: Bucks Water Act 1937 (1 Edw. 8 & 1 Geo. 6. c. xcv)) and a Provisional Order.	
Ministry of Health Provisional Order Confirmation (Chiltern Hills Spring Water) Act 1943	6 & 7 Geo. 6. c. x	22 July 1943
An Act to confirm a Provisional Order of the Minister of Health relating to the Chiltern Hills Spring Water Company.
	Chiltern Hills Spring Water Order 1943 Provisional Order under the Gas and Water Works Facilities Act 1870 (Note: Gas and Water Works Facilities Act 1870 (33 & 34 Vict. c. 70)) and the Gas and Water Works Facilities Act 1870 Amendment Act 1873 (Note: Gas and Water Works Facilities Act 1870 Amendment Act 1873 (36 & 37 Vict. c. 89)) to modify the limits of supply of the Chiltern Hills Spring Water Company and for other purposes.	
Ministry of Health Provisional Order Confirmation (Banbury Water) Act 1943 (repealed)	6 & 7 Geo. 6. c. xi	22 July 1943
An Act to confirm a Provisional Order of the Minister of Health relating to the Banbury Water Company. (Repealed by Banbury Corporation Act 1946 (9 & 10 Geo. 6. c. lxii))
	Banbury Water Order 1943 Provisional Order under the Gas and Water Works Facilities Act 1870 and the Gas and Water Works Facilities Act 1870 Amendment Act 1873 to make further provision as to the capital and borrowing powers of the Banbury Water Company and for other purposes.	
Ministry of Health Provisional Order Confirmation (Harrogate) Act 1943	6 & 7 Geo. 6. c. xii	22 July 1943
An Act to confirm a Provisional Order of the Minister of Health relating to the borough of Harrogate.
	Harrogate Order 1943 Provisional Order altering certain local Acts and a Provisional Order.	
Ministry of Health Provisional Order Confirmation (Wetherby District Water) Act 1943	6 & 7 Geo. 6. c. xiii	22 July 1943
An Act to confirm a Provisional Order of the Minister of Health relating to the Wetherby District Water Company.
	Wetherby District Water Order 1943 Provisional Order under the Gas and Water Works Facilities Act 1870 and the Gas and Water Works Facilities Act 1870 Amendment Act 1873 to reduce the limits of supply of the Wetherby District Water Company and for other purposes.	
London County Council (Money) Act 1943 (repealed)	6 & 7 Geo. 6. c. xiv	22 July 1943
An Act to regulate the expenditure on capital account and lending of money by the London County Council during the financial period from the first day of April one thousand nine hundred and forty-three to the thirtieth day of September one thousand nine hundred and forty-four and for other purposes. (Repealed by London County Council (Loans) Act 1955 (4 & 5 Eliz. 2. c. xxvi))
Northampton Corporation Act 1943	6 & 7 Geo. 6. c. xv	5 August 1943 (Note: The King's Printer's copy erroneously says 6 August 1943 as the date of royal assent for this act.)
An Act to confer further powers on the corporation of Northampton with reference to their water undertaking to make further provision with respect to the health local government and finance of the borough and for other purposes.
Cardiff Corporation Act 1943	6 & 7 Geo. 6. c. xvi	5 August 1943
An Act to confirm agreements between the Taf Fechan Water Supply Board and the Magor and Saint Mellons Rural District Council respectively and the lord mayor aldermen and citizens of the city of Cardiff and to enact consequential provisions to provide for the vesting in the said lord mayor aldermen and citizens of the undertaking of the Company of Proprietors of the Glamorganshire Canal Navigation the dissolution of that company and the closing of their navigation to empower the said lord mayor aldermen and citizens to acquire certain lands and for other purposes.

== 7 & 8 Geo. 6 ==
The ninth session of the 37th Parliament of the United Kingdom, which met from 24 November 1943 until 28 November 1944.

This session was also traditionally cited as 7 & 8 G. 6.

=== Public general acts ===
Short title	Citation	Royal assent
Long title
Expiring Laws Continuance Act 1943 (repealed)	7 & 8 Geo. 6. c. 1	16 December 1943
An Act to continue certain expiring laws. (Repealed by Statute Law Revision Act 1950 (14 Geo. 6. c. 6))
Local Elections and Register of Electors (Temporary Provisions) Act 1943 (repealed)	7 & 8 Geo. 6. c. 2	16 December 1943
An Act to continue in force the Local Elections and Register of Electors (Temporary Provisions) Act, 1939, (Note: Local Elections and Register of Electors (Temporary Provisions) Act 1939 (2 & 3 Geo. 6. c. 115)) as amended by subsequent Acts and subject to certain further amendments, and to amend section two of the Local Elections and Register of Electors (Temporary Provisions) Act, 1940. (Note: Local Elections and Register of Electors (Temporary Provisions) Act 1940 (4 & 5 Geo. 6. c. 3)) (Repealed by Statute Law (Repeals) Act 1978 (c. 45))
Mining Industry (Welfare Fund) Act 1943 (repealed)	7 & 8 Geo. 6. c. 3	16 December 1943
An Act to continue the operation of section one of the Mining Industry (Welfare Fund) Act, 1939. (Note: Mining Industry (Welfare Fund) Act 1939 (2 & 3 Geo. 6. c. 9)) (Repealed by Miners' Welfare Act 1952 (15 & 16 Geo. 6 & 1 Eliz. 2. c. 23))

== See also ==
- List of acts of the Parliament of the United Kingdom
