= Representation of the People Act 1945 =

Act of the Parliament of the United Kingdom

Representation of the People Act 1945 (Note: Section 40(1).)
- Act of Parliament
- Parliament of the United Kingdom
- Long title: An Act to amend the law relating to parliamentary and local government franchises, and the registration of parliamentary and local government electors, to provide for the resumption of local elections, and otherwise to amend the law relating to parliamentary and local government elections, including the redistribution of seats at parliamentary elections.
- Citation: 8 & 9 Geo. 6. c. 5
- Territorial extent: United Kingdom (Note: Section 39.)

Dates
- Royal assent: 15 February 1945
- Commencement: 15 February 1945 (Note: The Acts of Parliament (Commencement) Act 1793.)
- Repealed: 31 July 1978
Other legislation
Amends	See § Repealed enactments
Repeals/revokes	See § Repealed enactments
Amended by	Elections and Jurors Act 1945; Statute Law Revision Act 1963
Repealed by	Statute Law (Repeals) Act 1978

Status: Repealed

Text of statute as originally enacted

The Representation of the People Act 1945 (8 & 9 Geo. 6. c. 5) was an act of the Parliament of the United Kingdom that amended the law relating to parliamentary and local government franchises and to the registration of electors, and provided for the resumption of local elections in the United Kingdom.

Local elections and the annual preparation of the register of electors had been suspended for the duration of the Second World War by the Local Elections and Register of Electors (Temporary Provisions) Act 1939 (2 & 3 Geo. 6. c. 115), which was renewed annually until 1944. The act brought that suspension to an end and put in place the registration and voting arrangements used at the 1945 general election.

== Provisions ==
The act was divided into five parts. Part I extended the local government franchise and abolished the qualification of a spouse, and extended the meaning of "member of the forces" so as to include members of the Indian, Burmese and colonial defence forces and certain persons engaged in war work abroad. Part II provided for the resumption of local elections, including triennial elections, the annual election of one-third of councillors, elective auditors and the qualification for election and for holding office, with separate provision for the City of London and for county, district and town council elections in Scotland. Part III made temporary provision as to registration, including the registers to be in force for local government and parliamentary elections, the May 1945 register and the annual register under the act. Part IV made temporary provision as to voting, including postal voting by service voters at parliamentary and university elections and proxy voting by service voters at local government elections. Part V contained miscellaneous and general provisions, including an amendment as to the redistribution of seats, provision as to the expenses of registration, interpretation, and the application of the act to Northern Ireland.

The act had five schedules. The first prescribed the forms of service declaration and of declaration of residence by a war worker; the second made provision as to registration as a local government elector; the third made transitional provision on the expiration of the National Registration Act 1939 (2 & 3 Geo. 6. c. 91); the fourth adapted enactments to the act; and the fifth listed the enactments repealed.

=== Repealed enactments ===
Section 40(2) of the act repealed 10 enactments, listed in the fifth schedule to the act.

Citation	Short title	Extent of repeal
7 & 8 Geo. 5. c. 64	Representation of the People Act 1918	In Rule 2 of the First Schedule the words "the names of those who are entitled to vote as parliamentary electors but not as local government electors", except as respects Northern Ireland.
18 & 19 Geo. 5. c. 12	Representation of the People (Equal Franchise) Act 1928	So much of section one as inserts in the Act of 1918 a new paragraph (c) of subsection (1) of section one, so much of section two as inserts in that Act a new paragraph (c) of and proviso (iii) to section three, and so much of section seven as inserts in that Act a new sub-paragraph (c) of paragraph (3) of section forty-three, except as respects the cases mentioned in the proviso to section two of this Act.
2 & 3 Geo. 6. c. 115	Local Elections and Register of Electors (Temporary Provisions) Act 1939	The whole act, except section nine and section three as it applies for the purposes of section nine.
4 & 5 Geo. 6. c. 3	Local Elections and Register of Electors (Temporary Provisions) Act 1940	The whole act, except section two and except in so far as it amends section three of the last mentioned Act as that section applies in Northern Ireland.
4 & 5 Geo. 6. c. 49	Local Elections and Register of Electors (Temporary Provisions) Act 1941	The whole act.
5 & 6 Geo. 6. c. 38	Local Elections and Register of Electors (Temporary Provisions) Act 1942	The whole act.
6 & 7 Geo. 6. c. 48	Parliamentary Electors (War-Time Registration) Act 1943	In subsection (4) of section one the words from the beginning of the subsection to "business premises register".
6 & 7 Geo. 6. c. 48	Parliamentary Electors (War-Time Registration) Act 1943	Paragraph (b) of subsection (1) and subsection (2) of section six, except as respects the cases mentioned in the proviso to section two of this Act.
6 & 7 Geo. 6. c. 48	Parliamentary Electors (War-Time Registration) Act 1943	In paragraph (a) of subsection (2) of section twelve, the words "and business premises register", and paragraph (b) of subsection (3) of that section.
6 & 7 Geo. 6. c. 48	Parliamentary Electors (War-Time Registration) Act 1943	Subsections (2) and (4) of section fourteen, except as respects registration expenses incurred and fees and other sums received before the eighth day of May, nineteen hundred and forty-five, and except as respects Northern Ireland.
6 & 7 Geo. 6. c. 48	Parliamentary Electors (War-Time Registration) Act 1943	Subsections (1) and (2) of section nineteen, and in subsection (5) of that section the words "a register of electors or".
6 & 7 Geo. 6. c. 48	Parliamentary Electors (War-Time Registration) Act 1943	Subsection (2) of section twenty-one.
6 & 7 Geo. 6. c. 48	Parliamentary Electors (War-Time Registration) Act 1943	Subsection (2) of section twenty-four.
6 & 7 Geo. 6. c. 48	Parliamentary Electors (War-Time Registration) Act 1943	The Third Schedule, except that paragraphs 1 to 3 shall continue to have effect for the period and in the cases mentioned in the proviso to subsection (2) of section twenty-four of this Act.
7 & 8 Geo. 6. c. 2	Local Elections and Register of Electors (Temporary Provisions) Act 1943	The whole act except section two.
7 & 8 Geo. 6. c. 41	House of Commons (Redistribution of Seats) Act 1944	Subsection (2) of section three.
7 & 8 Geo. 6. c. 41	House of Commons (Redistribution of Seats) Act 1944	Sub-paragraph (b) of paragraph (1) of rule 8 of the Third Schedule.
8 & 9 Geo. 6. c. 3	Local Elections and Register of Electors (Temporary Provisions) Act 1944	The whole act.

== Subsequent developments ==
Section 1(3) of, and the first schedule to, the Elections and Jurors Act 1945 (9 & 10 Geo. 6. c. 21) provided that section 16, section 17 and section 22 of the act, sub-paragraph (iv) of paragraph (b) of subsection (1) of section 13, and certain words in sub-paragraph (iii) of that paragraph, should cease to have effect.

The temporary registration and voting arrangements made by the act were replaced by the Representation of the People Act 1948 (11 & 12 Geo. 6. c. 65), which put the registration of parliamentary and local government electors on a permanent peacetime footing.

Part II of the act, and in section 38 of the , the words " and the expression local government elector shall be construed accordingly ", were repealed by section 1 of, and the schedule to, the Statute Law Revision Act 1963, which came into force on 31 July 1963.

The whole act was repealed by section 1(1) of, and part VI of schedule 1 to, the Statute Law (Repeals) Act 1978, which came into force on 31 July 1978. That act gave effect to recommendations of the Law Commission and the Scottish Law Commission for the repeal of enactments no longer of practical utility.
