= Courts (Emergency Powers) Act 1943 =

Act of the Parliament of the United Kingdom

Courts (Emergency Powers) Act 1943 (Note: Section 14(1).)
- Act of Parliament
- Parliament of the United Kingdom
- Long title: An Act to consolidate the Courts (Emergency Powers) Acts, 1939 to 1942, and certain enactments relating to the possession of mortgaged land.
- Citation: 6 & 7 Geo. 6. c. 19
- Territorial extent: England and Wales; Northern Ireland; (Note: Sections 10 and 11.)

Dates
- Royal assent: 22 April 1943
- Commencement: 22 April 1943 (Note: The Acts of Parliament (Commencement) Act 1793.)
- Repealed: 18 December 1953
Other legislation
Amends	See § Repealed enactments
Repeals/revokes	See § Repealed enactments
Repealed by	Statute Law Revision Act 1950; Statute Law Revision Act 1953

Status: Repealed

Text of statute as originally enacted

The Courts (Emergency Powers) Act 1943 (6 & 7 Geo. 6. c. 19) was an act of the Parliament of the United Kingdom that consolidated enactments related to emergency powers of courts and the possession of mortgaged land in England and Wales and Northern Ireland.

== Provisions ==
=== Repealed enactments ===
Section 14(2) of the act repealed 5 enactments, listed in the second schedule to the act.

Citation	Short title	Extent of repeal
2 & 3 Geo. 6. c. 67	Courts (Emergency Powers) Act 1939	The whole act.
2 & 3 Geo. 6. c. 108	Possession of Mortgaged Land (Emergency Provisions) Act 1939	The whole act.
3 & 4 Geo. 6. c. 37	Courts (Emergency Powers) Amendment Act 1940	The whole act.
4 & 5 Geo. 6. c. 24	Liabilities (War-Time Adjustment) Act 1941	Part II.
5 & 6 Geo. 6. c. 36	Courts (Emergency Powers) Amendment Act 1942	The whole act.

== Subsequent developments ==
The whole act, so far as unrepealed, was repealed by section 1 of, and the first schedule to, the Statute Law Revision Act 1953 (2 & 3 Eliz. 2. c. 5), which came into force on 18 December 1953.
