= Allied Powers (Maritime Courts) Act 1941 =

Act of the Parliament of the United Kingdom

Allied Powers (Maritime Courts) Act 1941 (Note: Section 20(1).)
- Act of Parliament
- Parliament of the United Kingdom
- Long title: An Act to make temporary provision for enabling allied and associated Powers to establish and maintain in the United Kingdom Maritime Courts for the trial and punishment of certain offences committed by persons other than British subjects; to provide for the trial and punishment by British courts of similar offences committed by British subjects; and for purposes connected with the matters aforesaid.
- Citation: 4 & 5 Geo. 6. c. 21
- Territorial extent: United Kingdom (Note: Section 20(3).)

Dates
- Royal assent: 22 May 1941
- Commencement: 22 May 1941 (Note: The Acts of Parliament (Commencement) Act 1793.)
- Repealed: 23 May 1950
Other legislation
Repealed by	Statute Law Revision Act 1950
Relates to	Allied Forces Act 1940

Status: Repealed

Text of statute as originally enacted

The Allied Powers (Maritime Courts) Act 1941 (4 & 5 Geo. 6. c. 21) was an act of the Parliament of the United Kingdom that allowed certain British Allies during the Second World War to set up maritime courts with criminal jurisdiction within the United Kingdom.

== Background ==
The act came into need because of the early events of the Second World War, in which the remnants of the European anti-Nazi forces fled to Britain after their defeat. Finding their armed forces in Britain, sometimes with a large number of merchant navy ships, they had no effective machinery of justice. The Visiting Forces (British Commonwealth) Act 1933 (23 & 24 Geo. 5. c. 6) and Allied Forces Act 1940 (3 & 4 Geo. 6. c. 51) provided some martial courts, but nothing for maritime law.

== Provisions ==
Section 1 of the act allowed for new maritime courts to exercise jurisdiction over offences committed by any non-British person on a merchant vessel owned by the nation or power which constituted the court. Section 2 allowed for the courts to hear cases against their own citizens involving mercantile conscription laws. However, individuals could only be ordered before the court with a writ from a British justice of the peace, and punishment took place in British prisons. Both the Netherlands and Norway constituted courts under this Act, which was eventually repealed after the close of the war with the Statute Law Revision Act 1950.

Macmillan notes the similarity of purpose with a Dutch law of 1541, passed by Maximilian of Burgundy, which allowed Scots merchants at Veere in Zeeland to be governed by Scots law.

== Subsequent developments ==
The whole act was repealed by section 1(1) of, and the first schedule to, the Statute Law Revision Act 1950 (14 Geo. 6. c. 6), which came into force on 23 May 1950.

== Bibliography ==
- Chorley, R.S.T. (1941). "Allied Powers (Maritime Courts) Act, 1941". Modern Law Review. 5 (2). Blackwell Publishing: 118–120. ISSN 0026-7961. JSTOR 1090046.
