= List of acts of the Parliament of the United Kingdom from 1942 =

This is a complete list of acts of the Parliament of the United Kingdom for the year 1942.

Note that the first parliament of the United Kingdom was held in 1801; parliaments between 1707 and 1800 were either parliaments of Great Britain or of Ireland. For acts passed up until 1707, see the list of acts of the Parliament of England and the list of acts of the Parliament of Scotland. For acts passed from 1707 to 1800, see the list of acts of the Parliament of Great Britain. See also the list of acts of the Parliament of Ireland.

For acts of the devolved parliaments and assemblies in the United Kingdom, see the list of acts of the Scottish Parliament, the list of acts of the Northern Ireland Assembly, and the list of acts and measures of Senedd Cymru; see also the list of acts of the Parliament of Northern Ireland.

The number shown after each act's title is its chapter number. Acts passed before 1963 are cited using this number, preceded by the year(s) of the reign during which the relevant parliamentary session was held; thus the Union with Ireland Act 1800 is cited as "39 & 40 Geo. 3. c. 67", meaning the 67th act passed during the session that started in the 39th year of the reign of George III and which finished in the 40th year of that reign. Note that the modern convention is to use Arabic numerals in citations (thus "41 Geo. 3" rather than "41 Geo. III"). Acts of the last session of the Parliament of Great Britain and the first session of the Parliament of the United Kingdom are both cited as "41 Geo. 3". Acts passed from 1963 onwards are simply cited by calendar year and chapter number.

== 5 & 6 Geo. 6 ==
Continuing the seventh session of the 37th Parliament of the United Kingdom, which met from 12 November 1941 until 10 November 1942.

This session was also traditionally cited as 5 & 6 G. 6.

=== Public general acts ===
Short title	Citation	Royal assent
Long title
Education (Scotland) Act 1942 (repealed)	5 & 6 Geo. 6. c. 5	26 February 1942
An Act to amend the law of Scotland regarding the provision by education authorities of food and clothing to school children. (Repealed by Education (Scotland) Act 1946 (9 & 10 Geo. 6. c. 72))
Patents and Designs Act 1942 (repealed)	5 & 6 Geo. 6. c. 6	26 February 1942
An Act to amend the Patents and Designs Acts, 1907 to 1939, as respects the extension of the term of a patent where the patentee has suffered loss by reason of hostilities, as respects the right of the Crown to use inventions and designs, and as respects arrangements with other countries relating to inventions and designs. (Repealed by Patents Act 1949 (12, 13 & 14 Geo. 6. c. 87) and Registered Designs Act 1949 (12, 13 & 14 Geo. 6. c. 88))
India (Federal Court Judges) Act 1942 (repealed)	5 & 6 Geo. 6. c. 7	26 February 1942
An Act to extend the power of the Governor-General of India to make acting appointments of judges of the Federal Court. (Repealed by Statute Law (Repeals) Act 1976 (c. 16))
War Orphans Act 1942	5 & 6 Geo. 6. c. 8	26 February 1942
An Act to amend section nine of the War Pensions (Administrative Provisions) Act, 1918, (Note: War Pensions (Administrative Provisions) Act 1918 (8 & 9 Geo. 5. c. 57)) and for purposes connected therewith.
Restoration of Pre-War Trade Practices Act 1942 (repealed)	5 & 6 Geo. 6. c. 9	26 February 1942
An Act to make provision with respect to the restoration after the war period of trade practices obtaining before that period. (Repealed by Statute Law (Repeals) Act 1986 (c. 12))
Securities (Validation) Act 1942 (repealed)	5 & 6 Geo. 6. c. 10	26 February 1942
An Act to provide for the validation of certain acts which affect securities and are in breach of the Defence (Finance) Regulations, 1939, (Note: Defence (Finance) Regulations 1939 (SR&O 1939/950)) or the Defence (Finance) Regulations (Isle of Man), 1939. (Note: Defence (Finance) Regulations (Isle of Man) 1939 (SR&O 1939/969)) (Repealed by Statute Law (Repeals) Act 1986 (c. 12))
Ministers of the Crown and House of Commons Disqualification Act 1942 (repealed)	5 & 6 Geo. 6. c. 11	26 February 1942
An Act to extend the House of Commons Disqualification (Temporary Provisions) Act, 1941, (Note: House of Commons Disqualification (Temporary Provisions) Act 1941 (4 & 5 Geo. 6. c. 8)) with amendments, and to provide for the prospective repeal of the Ministers of the Crown (Emergency Appointments) Act, 1939. (Note: Ministers of the Crown (Emergency Appointments) Act 1939 (2 & 3 Geo. 6. c. 77)) (Repealed by Statute Law Revision Act 1953 (2 & 3 Eliz. 2. c. 5))
Consolidated Fund (No. 2) Act 1942 (repealed)	5 & 6 Geo. 6. c. 12	19 March 1942
An Act to apply certain sums out of the Consolidated Fund to the service of the years ending on the thirty-first day of March, one thousand nine hundred and forty-two and one thousand nine hundred and forty-three. (Repealed by Statute Law Revision Act 1950 (14 Geo. 6. c. 6))
Landlord and Tenant (Requisitioned Land) Act 1942	5 & 6 Geo. 6. c. 13	26 March 1942
An Act to provide for the disclaimer of leases comprising land of which possession has been taken in the exercise of emergency powers, for the adjustment of the rights of the parties to such leases with respect to certain buildings and fixtures, for the reduction in certain cases of the rent and other periodical sums payable under or in connection with leases comprising such land, for requiring the continuance, after possession of such land has been taken as aforesaid, of certain services provided by the landlord, and for purposes connected with the matters aforesaid.
National Loans Act 1942 (repealed)	5 & 6 Geo. 6. c. 14	29 April 1942
An Act to extend the powers of the Treasury to raise money under section one of the National Loans Act, 1939. (Note: National Loans Act 1939 (2 & 3 Geo. 6. c. 117)) (Repealed by National Loans Act 1968 (c. 13))
Army and Air Force (Annual) Act 1942 (repealed)	5 & 6 Geo. 6. c. 15	29 April 1942
An Act to provide, during twelve months, for the discipline and regulation of the Army and the Air Force. (Repealed by Statute Law Revision Act 1950 (14 Geo. 6. c. 6), Army and Air Force (Annual) Act 1952 (15 & 16 Geo. 6 & 1 Eliz. 2. c. 24), Statute Law Revision Act 1953 (2 & 3 Eliz. 2. c. 5) and Revision of the Army and Air Force Acts (Transitional Provisions) Act 1955 (3 & 4 Eliz. 2. c. 20))
Sugar Industry Act 1942 (repealed)	5 & 6 Geo. 6. c. 16	29 April 1942
An Act to amend the Sugar Industry (Reorganization) Act, 1936, (Note: Sugar Industry (Reorganisation) Act 1936 (26 Geo. 5 & 1 Edw. 8. c. 18)) as respects the war years. (Repealed by Sugar Act 1956 (4 & 5 Eliz. 2. c. 48))
Anglo-Venezuelan Treaty (Island of Patos) Act 1942 (repealed)	5 & 6 Geo. 6. c. 17	21 May 1942
An Act to approve a Treaty signed on behalf of His Majesty and on behalf of the President of the United States of Venezuela relating to the Island of Patos. (Repealed by Statute Law (Repeals) Act 1995 (c. 44))
Royal Naval Volunteer Reserve Act 1942 (repealed)	5 & 6 Geo. 6. c. 18	11 June 1942
An Act to extend the term of service of members of the Royal Naval Volunteer Reserve. (Repealed by Statute Law Revision Act 1963 (c. 30))
Coal (Concurrent Leases) Act 1942 (repealed)	5 & 6 Geo. 6. c. 19	11 June 1942
An Act to exclude from retention under section five of the Coal Act, 1938, (Note: Coal Act 1938 (1 & 2 Geo. 6. c. 52)) interests arising under certain concurrent leases, and for purposes connected therewith. (Repealed by Statute Law (Repeals) Act 1973 (c. 39))
Marriage (Scotland) Act 1942 (repealed)	5 & 6 Geo. 6. c. 20	11 June 1942
An Act to amend the law of Scotland with regard to notice of intended marriage and to subscription by persons unable to write of documents required for the purpose of marriage. (Repealed by Marriage (Scotland) Act 1977 (c. 15))
Finance Act 1942	5 & 6 Geo. 6. c. 21	24 June 1942
An Act to grant certain duties, to alter other duties, and to amend the law relating to the Public Revenue and the National Debt, and to make further provision in connection with Finance.
Consolidated Fund (No. 3) Act 1942 (repealed)	5 & 6 Geo. 6. c. 22	24 June 1942
An Act to apply a sum out of the Consolidated Fund to the service of the Year ending on the thirty-first day of March, one thousand nine hundred and forty-three. (Repealed by Statute Law Revision Act 1950 (14 Geo. 6. c. 6))
Minister of Works and Planning Act 1942 renamed to Minister of Works Act 1942	5 & 6 Geo. 6. c. 23	24 June 1942
An Act to make provision in connection with the appointment of a Minister of Works and Planning, to provide for the transfer to that Minister of the functions and property of the Commissioners of Works, of the functions and property of the Commissioners of Public Works in Ireland, and of functions of the Minister of Health in relation to town and country planning; and for purposes connected with the matters aforesaid.
Post Office and Telegraph (Money) Act 1942 (repealed)	5 & 6 Geo. 6. c. 24	29 July 1942
An Act to provide for raising further money for the development of the postal, telegraphic and telephonic systems and the repayment to the Post Office Fund of moneys applied thereout for such development. (Repealed by Post Office Act 1961 (9 & 10 Eliz. 2. c. 15))
Isle of Man (Customs) Act 1942 (repealed)	5 & 6 Geo. 6. c. 25	29 July 1942
An Act to amend the law with respect to customs in the Isle of Man. (Repealed by Isle of Man (Customs) Act 1943 (6 & 7 Geo. 6. c. 37))
Pensions (Mercantile Marine) Act 1942	5 & 6 Geo. 6. c. 26	29 July 1942
An Act to amend the Pensions (Navy, Army, Air Force and Mercantile Marine) Act, 1939, (Note: Pensions (Navy, Army, Air Force and Mercantile Marine) Act 1939 (2 & 3 Geo. 6. c. 83)) as respects mariners and other seafaring persons; to explain the meaning of "physical injury" in that Act and in the Personal Injuries (Emergency Provisions) Act, 1939, (Note: Personal Injuries (Emergency Provisions) Act 1939 (2 & 3 Geo. 6. c. 82)) and to make a consequential amendment of section three of the last-mentioned Act.
Appropriation Act 1942 (repealed)	5 & 6 Geo. 6. c. 27	6 August 1942
An Act to apply a sum out of the Consolidated Fund to the service of the year ending on the thirty-first day of March, one thousand nine hundred and forty-three, and to appropriate the Supplies granted in this Session of Parliament. (Repealed by Statute Law Revision Act 1950 (14 Geo. 6. c. 6))
War Damage (Amendment) Act 1942 (repealed)	5 & 6 Geo. 6. c. 28	6 August 1942
An Act to amend the War Damage Act, 1941, (Note: War Damage Act 1941 (4 & 5 Geo. 6. c. 12)) and Part II and section sixteen of the War Risks Insurance Act, 1939. (Note: War Risks Insurance Act 1939 (2 & 3 Geo. 6. c. 57)) (Repealed by Statute Law (Repeals) Act 1981 (c. 19))
Allied Powers (War Service) Act 1942 (repealed)	5 & 6 Geo. 6. c. 29	6 August 1942
An Act to make provision as to the liability to war service of the nationals of allied Powers, to define for the purposes of the Allied Forces Act, 1940, (Note: Allied Forces Act 1940 (3 & 4 Geo. 6. c. 51)) membership of certain allied and associated forces, and to remove doubts as to the powers of imprisoning or detaining persons sentenced by service courts exercising jurisdiction by virtue of that Act. (Repealed by Statute Law Revision Act 1963 (c. 30))
National Service (Foreign Countries) Act 1942 (repealed)	5 & 6 Geo. 6. c. 30	6 August 1942
An Act to provide for the imposition upon British subjects in foreign countries of obligations with respect to service in His Majesty's forces of the like character as are imposed upon British subjects in Great Britain. (Repealed by National Service Act 1947 (10 & 11 Geo. 6. c. 31))
United States of America (Visiting Forces) Act 1942 (repealed)	5 & 6 Geo. 6. c. 31	6 August 1942
An Act to give effect to an agreement recorded in Notes exchanged between His Majesty's Government in the United Kingdom and the Government of the United States of America, relating to jurisdiction over members of the military and naval forces of the United States of America. (Repealed by Visiting Forces Act 1952 (15 & 16 Geo. 6 & 1 Eliz. 2. c. 67))
Housing (Rural Workers) Act 1942 (repealed)	5 & 6 Geo. 6. c. 32	6 August 1942
An Act to extend the time within which applications for assistance under the Housing (Rural Workers) Act, 1926, (Note: Housing (Rural Workers) Act 1926 (16 & 17 Geo. 5. c. 56)) may be received by local authorities. (Repealed for England and Wales by Housing Finance Act 1972 (c. 47) and for Scotland by Housing (Financial Provisions) (Scotland) Act 1972 (c. 46))
Appropriation (No. 2) Act 1942 (repealed)	5 & 6 Geo. 6. c. 33	11 September 1942
An Act to apply a sum out of the Consolidated Fund to the service of the year ending on the thirty-first day of March, one thousand nine hundred and forty-three, and to appropriate the further Supplies granted in this Session of Parliament. (Repealed by Statute Law Revision Act 1950 (14 Geo. 6. c. 6))
Appropriation (No. 3) Act 1942 (repealed)	5 & 6 Geo. 6. c. 34	22 October 1942
An Act to apply a sum out of the Consolidated Fund to the service of the year ending on the thirty-first day of March, one thousand nine hundred and forty-three, and to appropriate the further Supplies granted in this Session of Parliament. (Repealed by Statute Law Revision Act 1950 (14 Geo. 6. c. 6))
Greenwich Hospital Act 1942	5 & 6 Geo. 6. c. 35	22 October 1942
An Act to extend the powers of the Admiralty under section twenty of the Greenwich Hospital Act, 1865, (Note: Greenwich Hospital Act 1865 (28 & 29 Vict. c. 89)) with respect to the grant and allocation of pensions and pecuniary benefits in the case of persons employed for the purposes of Greenwich Hospital and otherwise to amend the said section; to provide, on the death of any such persons, for the distribution without probate or other proof of title of sums not exceeding one hundred pounds due to those persons or to their legal personal representatives; and for purposes connected with the matters aforesaid.
Courts (Emergency Powers) Amendment Act 1942 (repealed)	5 & 6 Geo. 6. c. 36	22 October 1942
An Act to amend the Courts (Emergency Powers) Acts, 1939 to 1941, with respect to mortgages. (Repealed by Courts (Emergency Powers) Act 1943 (6 & 7 Geo. 6. c. 19))
Prolongation of Parliament Act 1942 (repealed)	5 & 6 Geo. 6. c. 37	22 October 1942
An Act to extend the duration of the present Parliament and to provide for the extension of the duration of the House of Commons of Northern Ireland. (Repealed by Statute Law Revision Act 1950 (14 Geo. 6. c. 6))
Local Elections and Register of Electors (Temporary Provisions) Act 1942 (repealed)	5 & 6 Geo. 6. c. 38	22 October 1942
An Act to continue in force the Local Elections and Register of Electors (Temporary Provisions) Act, 1939, (Note: Local Elections and Register of Electors (Temporary Provisions) Act 1939 (2 & 3 Geo. 6. c. 115)) as amended by the Local Elections and Register of Electors (Temporary Provisions) Act, 1940, (Note: Local Elections and Register of Electors (Temporary Provisions) Act 1940 (4 & 5 Geo. 6. c. 3)) and the Local Elections and Register of Electors (Temporary Provisions) Act, 1941. (Note: Local Elections and Register of Electors (Temporary Provisions) Act 1941 (4 & 5 Geo. 6. c. 49)) (Repealed by Representation of the People Act 1945 (8 & 9 Geo. 6. c. 5))
India and Burma (Temporary and Miscellaneous Provisions) Act 1942 (repealed)	5 & 6 Geo. 6. c. 39	22 October 1942
An Act to make temporary amendments as respects the government of India, to make certain other amendments in the Government of India Act, 1935, (Note: Government of India Act 1935 (26 Geo. 5 & 1 Edw. 8. c. 2)) and to make temporary provision as to certain matters connected with Burma. (Repealed by Statute Law (Repeals) Act 1976 (c. 16))
Welsh Courts Act 1942 (repealed)	5 & 6 Geo. 6. c. 40	22 October 1942
An Act to repeal section seventeen of the statute 27 Hen. 8. c. 26, (Note: Laws of Wales Act 1535 (27 Hen. 8. c. 26)) to remove doubt as to the right of Welsh speaking persons to testify in the Welsh language in courts of justice in Wales, and to enable rules to be made for the administration of oaths and affirmations in that language, and for the provision, employment, and payment, of interpreters in such courts. (Repealed by Welsh Language Act 1967 (c. 66) and Welsh Language Act 1993 (c. 38))

=== Local acts ===
Short title	Citation	Royal assent
Long title
Aberdeen Corporation (Fish Market Rates) Order Confirmation Act 1942 (repealed)	5 & 6 Geo. 6. c. i	21 May 1942
An Act to confirm a Provisional Order under the Private Legislation Procedure (Scotland) Act 1936 (Note: Private Legislation Procedure (Scotland) Act 1936 (26 Geo. 5 & 1 Edw. 8. c. 52)) relating to Aberdeen Corporation (Fish Market Rates). (Repealed by Aberdeen Corporation (Fish Market) Order Confirmation Act 1969 (c. xix))
	Aberdeen Corporation (Fish Market Rates) Order 1942 Provisional Order to authorise the corporation of the city and royal burgh of Aberdeen with the sanction of the Secretary of State to alter or add to or increase from. time to time the tolls dues stallages rates rents and sums or any of them payable in respect of the fish market and for other purposes.	
Newcastle and Gateshead Waterworks Act 1942 (repealed)	5 & 6 Geo. 6. c. ii	21 May 1942
An Act to empower the Newcastle and Gateshead Water Company to construct new waterworks and to acquire lands and easements therefor to authorise the Company to discontinue the use of certain existing waterworks and to dispose of the site thereof and for other purposes. (Repealed by Newcastle and Gateshead Water Order 1958 (SI 1958/724))
Land Drainage (Surrey County Council (Hogsmill River Improvement)) Provisional Order Confirmation Act 1942	5 & 6 Geo. 6. c. iii	11 June 1942
An Act to confirm a Provisional Order made by the Minister of Agriculture and Fisheries under the Surrey County Council Act 1936 (Note: Surrey County Council Act 1936 (26 Geo. 5 & 1 Edw. 8. c. cxxx)) for the execution of works for the improvement of the river Hogsmill and other rivers brooks and streams in the county of Surrey and for other purposes.
	Surrey County Council (Hogsmill River Improvement) Order 1942 Provisional Order under the Surrey County Council Act 1936 empowering the Surrey County Council to execute works for the improvement of the river Hogsmill and other rivers brooks and streams in the county of Surrey and for other purposes.	
Railway Companies (Thos. Cook and Son Limited Guarantee) Act 1942	5 & 6 Geo. 6. c. iv	11 June 1942
An Act to empower the Great Western Railway Company the London and North Eastern Railway Company the London Midland and Scottish Railway Company and the Southern Railway Company to give guarantees and to make financial and other arrangements in connection with or arising out of the acquisition by Hay's Wharf Cartage Company Limited of the share capital of Thos. Cook and Son Limited and for other purposes.
Bombay, Baroda and Central India Railway Act 1942 (repealed)	5 & 6 Geo. 6. c. v	11 June 1942
An Act for the winding up and dissolution of the Bombay Baroda and Central India Railway Company and for giving effect to arrangements made with the Governor-General of India in Council. (Repealed by Statute Law (Repeals) Act 2013 (c. 2))
London County Council (Money) Act 1942 (repealed)	5 & 6 Geo. 6. c. vi	24 June 1942
An Act to regulate the expenditure on capital account and lending of money by the London County Council during the financial period from the first day of April one thousand nine hundred and forty-two to the thirtieth day of September one thousand nine hundred and forty-three and for other purposes. (Repealed by London County Council (Loans) Act 1955 (4 & 5 Eliz. 2. c. xxvi))
Queen Elizabeth Hospital for Children Act 1942	5 & 6 Geo. 6. c. vii	24 June 1942
An Act to amalgamate the Princess Elizabeth of York Hospital for Children (formerly known as the East London Hospital for Children and Dispensary for Women) at Shadwell in the county of London and the Queen's Hospital for Children at Bethnal Green in the county of London to make provision with respect to the property and funds of the said hospitals to incorporate the governing body of the amalgamated hospitals and for other purposes.
Ministry of Health Provisional Order Confirmation (Carnarvon) Act 1942	5 & 6 Geo. 6. c. viii	29 July 1942
An Act to confirm a Provisional Order of the Minister of Health relating to the borough of Caernarvon.
	Carnarvon Order 1942 Provisional Order partially repealing and amending the Carnarvon Waterworks Act 1865 (Note: Carnarvon Waterworks Act 1865 (28 & 29 Vict. c. xcix)) and the Carnarvon Corporation Act 1897. (Note: Carnarvon Corporation Act 1897 (60 & 61 Vict. c. cix))	
Ministry of Health Provisional Order Confirmation (Mold Gas and Water) Act 1942	5 & 6 Geo. 6. c. ix	29 July 1942
An Act to confirm a Provisional Order of the Minister of Health relating to the Mold Gas and Water Company.
	Mold Gas and Water Order 1942 Provisional Order under the Gas and Water Works Facilities Act 1870 (Note: Gas and Water Works Facilities Act 1870 (33 & 34 Vict. c. 70)) and the Gas and Water Works Facilities Act 1870 Amendment Act 1873 (Note: Gas and Water Works Facilities Act 1870 Amendment Act 1873 (36 & 37 Vict. c. 89)) conferring further powers on the Mold Gas and Water Company and for other purposes.	
Pembrokeshire County Council Act 1942 (repealed)	5 & 6 Geo. 6. c. x	29 July 1942
An Act to empower the county council of the administrative county of Pembroke to establish a ferry across Milford Haven between Hobbs Point at Pembroke Dock and Neyland and for other purposes. (Repealed by Dyfed Act 1987 (c. xxiv))
London Passenger Transport Act 1942	5 & 6 Geo. 6. c. xi	29 July 1942
An Act to confer further powers upon the London Passenger Transport Board with respect to the creation and issue of transport stock and for other purposes.
Mid-Wessex Water Act 1942 (repealed)	5 & 6 Geo. 6. c. xii	29 July 1942
An Act to provide for uniform rates and charges for water applicable throughout the limits of supply of the Mid-Wessex Water Company and for other purposes. (Repealed by Mid-Wessex Water (No. 2) Order 1957 (SI 1957/2233))
South Wales Electric Power Act 1942	5 & 6 Geo. 6. c. xiii	29 July 1942
An Act to confer further powers on the South Wales Electric Power Company and for other purposes.
Ministry of Health Provisional Order Confirmation (Poole) Act 1942	5 & 6 Geo. 6. c. xiv	6 August 1942
An Act to confirm a Provisional Order of the Minister of Health relating to the borough of Poole.
	Poole Order 1942 Provisional order altering certain local Acts.	
Bilston Corporation Act 1942 (repealed)	5 & 6 Geo. 6. c. xv	6 August 1942
An Act to confer further powers on the mayor aldermen and burgesses of the borough of Bilston in regard to their water undertaking to make further and better provision for the improvement health and local government of the borough and for other purposes. (Repealed by Wolverhampton Corporation Act 1969 (c. lx))
Coventry Corporation Act 1942 (repealed)	5 & 6 Geo. 6. c. xvi	6 August 1942
An Act to amend the statutes relating to the qualification for the freedom of the city of Coventry with respect to apprentices who during the period of the present emergency are required to serve outside the city to confer further powers on the Corporation with regard to the health and improvement of the city and for other purposes. (Repealed by West Midlands County Council Act 1980 (c. xi))
London, Midland and Scottish Railway Order Confirmation Act 1942	5 & 6 Geo. 6. c. xvii	22 October 1942
An Act to confirm a Provisional Order under the Private Legislation Procedure (Scotland) Act 1936 relating to London Midland and Scottish Railway.
	London, Midland and Scottish Railway Order 1942 Provisional Order to vary centain provisions of the Caledonian Railway (Grangemouth Harbour) Act 1876 (Note: Caledonian Railway (Grangemouth Harbour) Act 1876 (39 & 40 Vict. c. xlviii)) and the Caledonian Railway Order, 1910 and for other purposes.	

== 6 & 7 Geo. 6 ==
The eighth session of the 37th Parliament of the United Kingdom, which met from 11 November 1942 until 23 November 1943.

This session was also traditionally cited as 6 & 7 G. 6.

=== Public general acts ===
Short title	Citation	Royal assent
Long title
Expiring Laws Continuance Act 1942 (repealed)	6 & 7 Geo. 6. c. 1	17 December 1942
An Act to continue certain expiring laws. (Repealed by Statute Law Revision Act 1950 (14 Geo. 6. c. 6))
Supreme Court (Northern Ireland) Act 1942 (repealed)	6 & 7 Geo. 6. c. 2	17 December 1942
An Act to provide for the amendment of enactments relating to the Supreme Court of Northern Ireland to correspond with alterations in county court jurisdiction made by the Parliament of Northern Ireland, and to make further provision as respects rules and orders relating to the said Supreme Court. (Repealed by Judicature (Northern Ireland) Act 1978 (c. 23))
National Service Act 1942 (repealed)	6 & 7 Geo. 6. c. 3	17 December 1942
An Act to authorise the making of preparatory arrangements for the calling up of male persons who are about to become liable to be called up for service under the National Service Acts, 1939 to 1941, to simplify the making of proclamations for the purposes of those Acts, and to amend the provisions of those Acts relating to exemptions. (Repealed by National Service Act 1948 (11 & 12 Geo. 6. c. 64))

=== Local acts ===
Short title	Citation	Royal assent
Long title
Edinburgh Merchant Company Endowments (Amendment) Order Confirmation Act 1942 (repealed)	6 & 7 Geo. 6. c. i	17 December 1942
An Act to confirm a Provisional Order under the Private Legislation Procedure (Scotland) Act 1936 (Note: Private Legislation Procedure (Scotland) Act 1936 (26 Geo. 5 & 1 Edw. 8. c. 52)) relating to the Edinburgh Merchant Company Endowments. (Repealed by Statute Law (Repeals) Act 1986 (c. 12))
	Edinburgh Merchant Company Endowments (Amendment) Order 1942 Provisional Order to amend the provisions of the Edinburgh Merchant Company Endowments Order 1909 so far as relating to William Watherston's Endowment.	

== See also ==
- List of acts of the Parliament of the United Kingdom
