= List of acts of the Parliament of the United Kingdom from 1941 =

This is a complete list of acts of the Parliament of the United Kingdom for the year 1941.

Note that the first parliament of the United Kingdom was held in 1801; parliaments between 1707 and 1800 were either parliaments of Great Britain or of Ireland. For acts passed up until 1707, see the list of acts of the Parliament of England and the list of acts of the Parliament of Scotland. For acts passed from 1707 to 1800, see the list of acts of the Parliament of Great Britain. See also the list of acts of the Parliament of Ireland.

For acts of the devolved parliaments and assemblies in the United Kingdom, see the list of acts of the Scottish Parliament, the list of acts of the Northern Ireland Assembly, and the list of acts and measures of Senedd Cymru; see also the list of acts of the Parliament of Northern Ireland.

The number shown after each act's title is its chapter number. Acts passed before 1963 are cited using this number, preceded by the year(s) of the reign during which the relevant parliamentary session was held; thus the Union with Ireland Act 1800 is cited as "39 & 40 Geo. 3. c. 67", meaning the 67th act passed during the session that started in the 39th year of the reign of George III and which finished in the 40th year of that reign. Note that the modern convention is to use Arabic numerals in citations (thus "41 Geo. 3" rather than "41 Geo. III"). Acts of the last session of the Parliament of Great Britain and the first session of the Parliament of the United Kingdom are both cited as "41 Geo. 3". Acts passed from 1963 onwards are simply cited by calendar year and chapter number.

== 4 & 5 Geo. 6 ==
Continuing the sixth session of the 37th Parliament of the United Kingdom, which met from 21 November 1940 until 11 November 1941.

This session was also traditionally cited as 4 & 5 G. 6.

=== Public general acts ===
Short title	Citation	Royal assent
Long title
Consolidated Fund (No. 1) Act 1941 (repealed)	4 & 5 Geo. 6. c. 6	12 February 1941
An Act to apply certain sums out of the Consolidated Fund to the service of the years ending on the thirty-first day of March, one thousand nine hundred and forty-one and one thousand nine hundred and forty-two. (Repealed by Statute Law Revision Act 1950 (14 Geo. 6. c. 6))
Diplomatic Privileges (Extension) Act 1941 (repealed)	4 & 5 Geo. 6. c. 7	6 March 1941
An Act to extend to certain other persons the immunities and privileges accorded to envoys of foreign Powers accredited to His Majesty. (Repealed by Statute Law (Repeals) Act 1973 (c. 39))
House of Commons Disqualification (Temporary Provisions) Act 1941 (repealed)	4 & 5 Geo. 6. c. 8	6 March 1941
An Act to make temporary provision for enabling persons required in the public interest to be employed for purposes connected with the war in offices and places under the Crown to be so employed without being disqualified for membership of the House of Commons. (Repealed by Statute Law Revision Act 1953 (2 & 3 Eliz. 2. c. 5))
Consolidated Fund (No. 2) Act 1941 (repealed)	4 & 5 Geo. 6. c. 9	26 March 1941
An Act to apply certain sums out of the Consolidated Fund to the service of the years ending on the thirty-first day of March, one thousand nine hundred and forty-one and one thousand nine hundred and forty-two. (Repealed by Statute Law Revision Act 1950 (14 Geo. 6. c. 6))
Air Raid Precautions (Postponement of Financial Investigation) Act 1941 (repealed)	4 & 5 Geo. 6. c. 10	26 March 1941
An Act to postpone the investigation to be made under section ten of the Air Raid Precautions Act, 1937, (Note: Air Raid Precautions Act 1937 (1 & 2 Geo. 6. c. 6)) until the year nineteen hundred and forty-one. (Repealed by Statute Law Revision Act 1950 (14 Geo. 6. c. 6))
Determination of Needs Act 1941 (repealed)	4 & 5 Geo. 6. c. 11	26 March 1941
An Act to abolish the requirement that in determining the need and assessing the needs of applicants for unemployment assistance or supplementary pensions the resources of all members of their households must be taken into account, to make further provision for the determination of need and the assessment of needs in the case of such applicants and in connection with financial assistance to blind persons, and to provide for the winding-up of the Unemployment Assistance Fund. (Repealed by National Assistance Act 1948 (11 & 12 Geo. 6. c. 29))
War Damage Act 1941 (repealed)	4 & 5 Geo. 6. c. 12	26 March 1941
An Act to make provision with respect to war damage to immovable property and to goods. (Repealed by Statute Law (Repeals) Act 1981 (c. 19))
Land Drainage (Scotland) Act 1941 (repealed)	4 & 5 Geo. 6. c. 13	26 March 1941
An Act to make further provision for the drainage of agricultural land in Scotland. (Repealed by Flood Prevention and Land Drainage (Scotland) Act 1997 (c. 36))
Public Works Loans Act 1941 (repealed)	4 & 5 Geo. 6. c. 14	10 April 1941
An Act to grant money for the purpose of certain local loans out of the Local Loans Fund, and for other purposes relating to local loans. (Repealed by National Loans Act 1968 (c. 13))
National Service Act 1941 (repealed)	4 & 5 Geo. 6. c. 15	10 April 1941
An Act to make provision for calling up men for civil defence and to amend the National Service (Armed Forces) Act, 1939. (Note: National Service (Armed Forces) Act 1939 (2 & 3 Geo. 6. c. 81)) (Repealed by National Service Act 1948 (11 & 12 Geo. 6. c. 64))
Isle of Man (Detention) Act 1941 (repealed)	4 & 5 Geo. 6. c. 16	10 April 1941
An Act to enable persons detained under powers conferred under the Emergency Powers (Defence) Acts, 1939 (Note: Emergency Powers (Defence) Act 1939 (2 & 3 Geo. 6. c. 62)) and 1940, (Note: Emergency Powers (Defence) Act 1940 (3 & 4 Geo. 6. c. 20)) or the Aliens Restriction Act, 1914, (Note: Aliens Restriction Act 1914 (4 & 5 Geo. 5. c. 12)) to be removed to and detained in the Isle of Man. (Repealed by Emergency Laws (Miscellaneous Provisions) Act 1947 (11 & 12 Geo. 6. c. 10))
Army and Air Force (Annual) Act 1941 (repealed)	4 & 5 Geo. 6. c. 17	10 April 1941
An Act to provide, during twelve months, for the discipline and regulation of the Army and the Air Force. (Repealed by Statute Law Revision Act 1950 (14 Geo. 6. c. 6) and Revision of the Army and Air Force Acts (Transitional Provisions) Act 1955 (3 & 4 Eliz. 2. c. 20))
National Loans Act 1941 (repealed)	4 & 5 Geo. 6. c. 18	30 April 1941
An Act to extend the powers of the Treasury to raise money under section one of the National Loans Act, 1939, (Note: National Loans Act 1939 (2 & 3 Geo. 6. c. 117)) and substitute other provisions for the provisions of paragraph 1 of the Second Schedule to that Act. (Repealed by National Loans Act 1968 (c. 13))
Chartered and Other Bodies (Temporary Provisions) Act 1941 (repealed)	4 & 5 Geo. 6. c. 19	30 April 1941
An Act to enable powers conferred by section two of the Chartered and Other Bodies (Temporary Provisions) Act, 1939, (Note: Chartered and Other Bodies (Temporary Provisions) Act 1939 (2 & 3 Geo. 6. c. 119)) to be exercised with respect to certain bodies incorporated by Royal Charter. (Repealed by Statute Law (Repeals) Act 1971 (c. 52))
Public and Other Schools (War Conditions) Act 1941 (repealed)	4 & 5 Geo. 6. c. 20	22 May 1941
An Act to make provision for promoting economy and efficiency in the carrying on of the work of public and certain other schools under war conditions. (Repealed by Statute Law Revision Act 1950 (14 Geo. 6. c. 6))
Allied Powers (Maritime Courts) Act 1941 (repealed)	4 & 5 Geo. 6. c. 21	22 May 1941
An Act to make temporary provision for enabling allied and associated Powers to establish and maintain in the United Kingdom Maritime Courts for the trial and punishment of certain offences committed by persons other than British subjects; to provide for the trial and punishment by British courts of similar offences committed by British subjects; and for purposes connected with the matters aforesaid. (Repealed by Statute Law Revision Act 1950 (14 Geo. 6. c. 6))
Fire Services (Emergency Provisions) Act 1941 (repealed)	4 & 5 Geo. 6. c. 22	22 May 1941
An Act to provide for the reorganisation and improvement of the fire services of Great Britain, and for purposes connected with the matters aforesaid. (Repealed by Statute Law Revision Act 1950 (14 Geo. 6. c. 6))
Temporary Migration of Children (Guardianship) Act 1941 (repealed)	4 & 5 Geo. 6. c. 23	12 June 1941
An Act to enable provision to be made for the temporary guardianship of children sent out of the United Kingdom during the present war period. (Repealed by Statute Law Revision Act 1953 (2 & 3 Eliz. 2. c. 5))
Liabilities (War-Time Adjustment) Act 1941 (repealed)	4 & 5 Geo. 6. c. 24	12 June 1941
An Act to provide for the arrangement or the adjustment and settlement of the affairs of persons financially affected by war circumstances; to amend the Courts (Emergency Powers) Acts, 1939 (Note: Courts (Emergency Powers) Act 1939 (2 & 3 Geo. 6. c. 67)) and 1940, (Note: Courts (Emergency Powers) Amendment Act 1940 (3 & 4 Geo. 6. c. 37)) and the Possession of Mortgaged Land (Emergency Provisions) Act, 1939; (Note: Possession of Mortgaged Land (Emergency Provisions) Act 1939 (2 & 3 Geo. 6. c. 108)) and for purposes connected with the matters aforesaid. (Repealed by Statute Law (Repeals) Act 1971 (c. 52))
Rating (War Damage) (Scotland) Act 1941 (repealed)	4 & 5 Geo. 6. c. 25	12 June 1941
An Act to enable rating authorities in Scotland to grant relief from rates in respect of lands and heritages suffering war damage. (Repealed by Statute Law (Repeals) Act 1975 (c. 10))
Consolidated Fund (No. 3) Act 1941 (repealed)	4 & 5 Geo. 6. c. 26	2 July 1941
An Act to apply a sum out of the Consolidated Fund to the service of the year ending on the thirty-first day of March, one thousand nine hundred and forty-two. (Repealed by Statute Law Revision Act 1950 (14 Geo. 6. c. 6))
Justices (Supplemental List) Act 1941 (repealed)	4 & 5 Geo. 6. c. 27	2 July 1941
An Act to provide for the establishment of supplemental lists of justices of the peace and for limiting the powers and duties of justices whose names are entered in such lists. (Repealed by Justices of the Peace Act 1949 (12, 13 & 14 Geo. 6. c. 101))
Trustee (War Damage Insurance) Act 1941 (repealed)	4 & 5 Geo. 6. c. 28	2 July 1941
An Act to remove doubts as to, and to supplement, the powers of trustees in relation to insurance against war damage. (Repealed by Statute Law (Repeals) Act 1981 (c. 19))
Naval Discipline (Amendment) Act 1941 (repealed)	4 & 5 Geo. 6. c. 29	2 July 1941
An Act to provide for the trial of certain offences against the Naval Discipline Act by disciplinary courts instead of by courts martial. (Repealed by Naval Discipline Act 1957 (5 & 6 Eliz. 2. c. 53))
Finance Act 1941	4 & 5 Geo. 6. c. 30	22 July 1941
An Act to grant certain duties, to alter other duties, and to amend the law relating to the Public Revenue and the National Debt, and to make further provision in connection with Finance.
Goods and Services (Price Control) Act 1941 (repealed)	4 & 5 Geo. 6. c. 31	22 July 1941
An Act to make further provision to prevent excessive prices being charged for goods and excessive charges being made for performing services in relation to goods (including hiring and subjecting to a process), to amend the Prices of Goods Act, 1939, (Note: Prices of Goods Act 1939 (2 & 3 Geo. 6. c. 118)) and for purposes connected with the matters aforesaid. (Repealed by Statute Law Revision Act 1950 (14 Geo. 6. c. 6) and Statute Law Revision Act 1953 (2 & 3 Eliz. 2. c. 5))
Isle of Man (Customs) Act 1941 (repealed)	4 & 5 Geo. 6. c. 32	22 July 1941
An Act to amend the law with respect to customs in the Isle of Man. (Repealed by Statute Law Revision Act 1950 (14 Geo. 6. c. 6))
Local Government (Financial Provisions) Act 1941 (repealed)	4 & 5 Geo. 6. c. 33	22 July 1941
An Act to extend the third fixed grant period under the Local Government Act, 1929, (Note: Local Government Act 1929 (19 & 20 Geo. 5. c. 17)) and to make provision for the stabilisation of Supplementary Exchequer Grants, and the continuance of schemes as to health services, during the term of such extension; and for purposes connected with the matters aforesaid. (Repealed by Local Government Act 1948 (11 & 12 Geo. 6. c. 26))
Repair of War Damage Act 1941 (repealed)	4 & 5 Geo. 6. c. 34	22 July 1941
An Act to amend the Housing (Emergency Powers) Act, 1939, (Note: Housing (Emergency Powers) Act 1939 (2 & 3 Geo. 6. c. 73)) and the Essential Buildings and Plant (Repair of War Damage) Act, 1939. (Note: Essential Buildings and Plant (Repair of War Damage) Act 1939) (Repealed by Statute Law (Repeals) Act 1981 (c. 19))
Colonial War Risks Insurance (Guarantees) Act 1941 (repealed)	4 & 5 Geo. 6. c. 35	29 July 1941
An Act to authorise the Secretary of State to agree to make good any deficiencies in funds established by colonies and certain other countries for insuring commodities against war risks. (Repealed by Statute Law (Repeals) Act 1973 (c. 39))
Financial Powers (U.S.A. Securities) Act 1941 (repealed)	4 & 5 Geo. 6. c. 36	29 July 1941
An Act to confer on the Treasury powers for giving effect to a loan agreement made between His Majesty's Government in the United Kingdom and the Reconstruction Finance Corporation, and to provide for payments in respect of the disposal of securities, income and other payments for the purposes of the agreement; and for purposes connected with the matters aforesaid. (Repealed by Statute Law (Repeals) Act 1973 (c. 39))
War Damage (Extension of Risk Period) Act 1941 (repealed)	4 & 5 Geo. 6. c. 37	29 July 1941
An Act to extend the provisions of the War Damage Act, 1941, (Note: War Damage Act 1941 (4 & 5 Geo. 6. c. 12)) relating to payments in respect of war damage under Part I of that Act to damage occurring after the thirty-first day of August, nineteen hundred and forty-one. (Repealed by War Damage (Amendment) Act 1942 (5 & 6 Geo. 6. c. 28))
Appropriation Act 1941 (repealed)	4 & 5 Geo. 6. c. 38	7 August 1941
An Act to apply a sum out of the Consolidated Fund to the service of the year ending on the thirty-first day of March one thousand nine hundred and forty-two, and to appropriate the Supplies granted in this Session of Parliament. (Repealed by Statute Law Revision Act 1950 (14 Geo. 6. c. 6))
National Health Insurance, Contributory Pensions and Workmen's Compensation Act 1941 (repealed)	4 & 5 Geo. 6. c. 39	7 August 1941
An Act to increase the rates of sickness and disablement benefit and the rates of contribution payable under the Acts relating to National Health Insurance, to extend the said Acts to persons employed otherwise than by way of manual labour at a rate of remuneration exceeding two hundred and fifty pounds a year, and in connection therewith to amend the Acts relating to widows', orphans' and old age contributory pensions and certain other enactments; to enable any of the Acts aforesaid to be adapted by regulations to wartime conditions; and to amend paragraph (a) of subsection (2) of section three of the Workmen's Compensation Act, 1925. (Note: Workmen's Compensation Act 1925 (15 & 16 Geo. 5. c. 84)) (Repealed for England and Wales and Scotland by National Insurance (Industrial Injuries) Act 1946 (9 & 10 Geo. 6. c. 62) and National Insurance Act 1946 (9 & 10 Geo. 6. c. 67) and for Northern Ireland by National Insurance Act (Northern Ireland) 1946 (c. 23 (N.I.)))
War Damage to Land (Scotland) Act 1941	4 & 5 Geo. 6. c. 40	7 August 1941
An Act to make further provision with regard to the rights of landlords and tenants of lands and heritages in Scotland which have sustained war damage and to obligations to insure against war damage to such lands and heritages and to amend the War Damage to Land (Scotland) Act, 1939. (Note: War Damage to Land (Scotland) Act 1939 (2 & 3 Geo. 6. c. 80))
Landlord and Tenant (War Damage) (Amendment) Act 1941	4 & 5 Geo. 6. c. 41	7 August 1941
An Act to amend the Landlord and Tenant (War Damage) Act, 1939. (Note: Landlord and Tenant (War Damage) Act 1939 (2 & 3 Geo. 6. c. 72))
Pharmacy and Medicines Act 1941 (repealed)	4 & 5 Geo. 6. c. 42	7 August 1941
An Act to amend the Pharmacy and Poisons Act, 1933, (Note: Pharmacy and Poisons Act 1933 (23 & 24 Geo. 5. c. 25)) to prohibit certain advertisements relating to medical matters, and to amend the law relating to medicines. (Repealed by Medicines Act 1968 (c. 67))
Appropriation (No. 2) Act 1941 (repealed)	4 & 5 Geo. 6. c. 43	2 October 1941
An Act to apply a sum out of the Consolidated Fund to the service of the year ending on the thirty-first day of March, one thousand nine hundred and forty-two, and to appropriate the further Supplies granted in this Session of Parliament. (Repealed by Statute Law Revision Act 1950 (14 Geo. 6. c. 6))
India and Burma (Postponement of Elections) Act 1941 (repealed)	4 & 5 Geo. 6. c. 44	2 October 1941
An Act to enable the dissolution of Provincial Legislative Assemblies in India and the House of Representatives in Burma to be postponed. (Repealed by Statute Law (Repeals) Act 1976 (c. 16))
Local Government (Financial Provisions) (Scotland) Act 1941 (repealed)	4 & 5 Geo. 6. c. 45	2 October 1941
An Act to extend the third fixed grant period under the Local Government (Scotland) Act, 1929, (Note: Local Government (Scotland) Act 1929 (19 & 20 Geo. 5. c. 25)) and to make provision for the stabilisation of Supplementary Exchequer Grants under the said Act; and for purposes connected with the matters aforesaid. (Repealed by Local Government Act 1948 (11 & 12 Geo. 6. c. 26))
Solicitors Act 1941 (repealed)	4 & 5 Geo. 6. c. 46	11 November 1941
An Act to require accountants' certificates as to compliance with the Solicitors' Accounts Rules, to establish a fund for relief in certain cases of losses due to dishonesty of solicitors, to make provision with respect to membership of the Law Society and with respect to the Council and Committees thereof, to amend the enactments relating to solicitors, and for purposes connected therewith. (Repealed by Solicitors Act 1957 (5 & 6 Eliz. 2. c. 27))
Marriage (Members of His Majesty's Forces) Act 1941 (repealed)	4 & 5 Geo. 6. c. 47	11 November 1941
An Act to provide further facilities for the marriage of members of His Majesty's forces (including women's services) during the war period, and to amend the Marriage (Naval, Military and Air Force Chapels) Act, 1932. (Note: Marriage (Naval, Military and Air Force Chapels) Act 1932 (22 & 23 Geo. 5. c. 31)) (Repealed for England and Wales by Marriage Act 1949 (12, 13 & 14 Geo. 6. c. 76) and for Scotland and Northern Ireland by Statute Law Revision Act 1953 (2 & 3 Eliz. 2. c. 5))
Prolongation of Parliament Act 1941 (repealed)	4 & 5 Geo. 6. c. 48	11 November 1941
An Act to extend the duration of the present Parliament. (Repealed by Statute Law Revision Act 1950 (14 Geo. 6. c. 6))
Local Elections and Register of Electors (Temporary Provisions) Act 1941 (repealed)	4 & 5 Geo. 6. c. 49	11 November 1941
An Act to continue in force the Local Elections and Register of Electors (Temporary Provisions) Act, 1939, (Note: Local Elections and Register of Electors (Temporary Provisions) Act 1939 (2 & 3 Geo. 6. c. 115)) as amended by the Local Elections and Register of Electors (Temporary Provisions) Act, 1940, (Note: Local Elections and Register of Electors (Temporary Provisions) Act 1940 (4 & 5 Geo. 6. c. 3)) and to make certain amendments of those Acts, including amendments modifying the qualifications of common councilmen of the City of London and the persons entitled to vote at elections of aldermen and common councilmen in the said City and postponing the preparation of ward lists in the said City. (Repealed by Representation of the People Act 1945 (8 & 9 Geo. 6. c. 5))
Agriculture (Miscellaneous Provisions) Act 1941 (repealed)	4 & 5 Geo. 6. c. 50	11 November 1941
An Act to amend the law relating to agriculture (including bee-keeping) and agricultural land. (Repealed by Statute Law (Repeals) Act 1993 (c. 50))

=== Local acts ===
Short title	Citation	Royal assent
Long title
Ministry of Health Provisional Order Confirmation (Shipley) Act 1941 (repealed)	4 & 5 Geo. 6. c. i	26 March 1941
An Act to confirm a Provisional Order of the Minister of Health relating to the urban district of Shipley. (Repealed by West Yorkshire Act 1980 (c. xiv))
	Shipley Order 1940 Provisional Order altering and partially repealing certain local Acts and Provisional Orders.	
Great Western Railway (Superannuation Fund) Act 1941	4 & 5 Geo. 6. c. ii	22 May 1941
An Act to provide for a superannuation fund for certain of the salaried staff of the Great Western Railway Company in substitution for the Great Western Railway Superannuation Scheme established under the provisions of the Great Western Railway (Superannuation Scheme) Act 1908 and for other purposes.
Southern Railway (Superannuation Fund) Act 1941	4 & 5 Geo. 6. c. iii	22 May 1941
An Act to substitute new rules for certain of the existing rules of the Southern Railway Superannuation Fund established by the Southern Railway (Superannuation Fund) Act 1927 (Note: Southern Railway (Superannuation Fund) Act 1927) to amend that Act and for other purposes.
East Surrey Gas Act 1941	4 & 5 Geo. 6. c. iv	22 May 1941
An Act to confer further powers upon the East Surrey Gas Company and for other purposes.
Camborne Water Act 1941	4 & 5 Geo. 6. c. v	12 June 1941
An Act to re-define the limits of supply of the Camborne Water Company to confer additional powers upon the Company and for other purposes.
Great Western Railway (Variation of Directors Qualification) Act 1941	4 & 5 Geo. 6. c. vi	12 June 1941
An Act to authorise persons holding offices or places of trust or profit under the Great Western Railway Company to become directors of the said Company and for other purposes.
Greenock Port and Harbours Order Confirmation Act 1941 (repealed)	4 & 5 Geo. 6. c. vii	2 July 1941
An Act to confirm a Provisional Order under the Private Legislation Procedure (Scotland) Act 1936 (Note: Private Legislation Procedure (Scotland) Act 1936 (26 Geo. 5 & 1 Edw. 8. c. 52)) relating to Greenock Port and Harbours. (Repealed by Statute Law (Repeals) Act 1986 (c. 12))
	Greenock Port and Harbours Order 1941 Provisional Order to authorise the Trustees of the Port and Harbours of Greenock to create a fund for meeting expenditure upon works of repair renewal and maintenance deferred owing to war conditions to authorise the Trustees to levy rates on seaplanes floating docks and similar craft and for other purposes.	
Land Drainage (Benwick Internal Drainage District) Provisional Order Confirmation Act 1941	4 & 5 Geo. 6. c. viii	2 July 1941
An Act to confirm a Provisional Order made by the Minister of Agriculture and Fisheries relating to a scheme submitted by the River Great Ouse Catchment Board under section 4 (I) (b) of the Land Drainage Act 1930. (Note: Land Drainage Act 1930 (20 & 21 Geo. 5. c. 44))
	Land Drainage (Benwick Internal Drainage District) Order 1941 River Great Ouse Catchment Board.	
Cannock Urban District Council Act 1941	4 & 5 Geo. 6. c. ix	2 July 1941
An Act to modify the provisions of the Cannock Urban District Council Act 1919 (Note: Cannock Urban District Council Act 1919 (9 & 10 Geo. 5. c. cxvii0) with regard to the period within which the consent of a local authority to the continuance of the running of omnibuses under that Act within their district should be obtained to provide that a consent given in accordance with the provisions of this Act shall be deemed to have been given in accordance with and for the purposes of the said Act to make such further provisions as may be incidental to the matters aforesaid and for other purposes.
Railway Clearing System Superannuation Fund Act 1941	4 & 5 Geo. 6. c. x	2 July 1941
An Act to provide for reorganisation of the affairs of the Railway Clearing System Superannuation Fund for alteration of the benefits to which contributing members of the fund are entitled and the contributions payable to the fund by contributing members and bodies for admission of women to the fund for sectional division of the fund and for guarantees of solvency for amendment of the Railway Clearing System Superannuation Fund Acts 1873 to 1914 and rules made thereunder and for other purposes.
London County Council (Money) Act 1941 (repealed)	4 & 5 Geo. 6. c. xi	2 July 1941
An Act to regulate the expenditure on capital account and lending of money by the London County Council during the financial period from the first day of April one thousand nine hundred and forty-one to the thirtieth day of September one thousand nine hundred and forty-two and for other purposes. (Repealed by London County Council (Loans) Act 1955 (4 & 5 Eliz. 2. c. xxvi))
London, Midland and Scottish Railway Act 1941	4 & 5 Geo. 6. c. xii	22 July 1941
An Act to empower the London Midland and Scottish Railway Company to acquire lands to amend the London Midland and Scottish Railway Superannuation Scheme to authorise the Midland and Great Northern Railways Joint Committee to acquire lands and for other purposes.
Ebbw Vale Urban District Council Act 1941	4 & 5 Geo. 6. c. xiii	22 July 1941
An Act to empower the urban district council of Ebbw Vale to construct new waterworks to confer further powers on the Council in regard to their water undertaking and for other purposes.
Portsmouth Water Act 1941	4 & 5 Geo. 6. c. xiv	22 July 1941
An Act to empower the Portsmouth Water Company to construct further works and to raise additional capital to confer additional powers upon the Company and for other purposes.
Provisional Order (Marriages) Confirmation Act 1941 (repealed)	4 & 5 Geo. 6. c. xv	7 August 1941
An Act to confirm certain Provisional Orders made by one of His Majesty's Principal Secretaries of State under the Marriages Validity (Provisional Orders) Acts 1905 (Note: Provisional Order (Marriages) Act 1905 (5 Edw. 7. c. 23)) and 1924. (Note: Marriages Validity (Provisional Orders) Act 1924 (14 & 15 Geo. 5. c. 20)) (Repealed by Statute Law (Repeals) Act 1977 (c. 18))
	Saint John Baptist Chapel Great Haywood Order	
	Baptist Church Higham Hill Road Walthamstow and the Tabernacle Greenleaf Road Walthamstow Order	
	The Saint Leonard Stowell Order	
Cardiff Corporation Act 1941	4 & 5 Geo. 6. c. xvi	7 August 1941
An Act to confer further powers upon the lord mayor aldermen and citizens of the city of Cardiff in respect of their electricity undertaking and for other purposes.
East Worcestershire Water Act 1941	4 & 5 Geo. 6. c. xvii	7 August 1941
An Act to empower the East Worcestershire Waterworks Company to construct further works and to raise additional capital to confer additional powers upon the Company and for other purposes.

== 5 & 6 Geo. 6 ==
The seventh session of the 37th Parliament of the United Kingdom, which met from 12 November 1941 until 10 November 1942.

This session was also traditionally cited as 5 & 6 G. 6.

=== Public general acts ===
Short title	Citation	Royal assent
Long title
Arthur Jenkins Indemnity Act 1941 (repealed)	5 & 6 Geo. 6. c. 1	10 December 1941
An Act to indemnify Arthur Jenkins, Esquire, from any penal consequence which he may have incurred by sitting or voting as a Member of the House of Commons while holding the office of Chairman of the Local Appeal Board for a Royal Ordnance Factory and to remove any disqualification for membership of that House by reason of his having held that office. (Repealed by Statute Law Revision Act 1953 (2 & 3 Eliz. 2. c. 5))
Consolidated Fund (No. 1) Act 1941 (Session 2) (repealed)	5 & 6 Geo. 6. c. 2	18 December 1941
An Act to apply a sun out of the Consolidated Fund to the service of the year ending on the thirty-first day of March, one thousand nine hundred and forty-two. (Repealed by Statute Law Revision Act 1950 (14 Geo. 6. c. 6))
Expiring Laws Continuance Act 1941 (repealed)	5 & 6 Geo. 6. c. 3	18 December 1941
An Act to continue certain expiring laws. (Repealed by Statute Law Revision Act 1950 (14 Geo. 6. c. 6))
National Service (No. 2) Act 1941 (repealed)	5 & 6 Geo. 6. c. 4	18 December 1941
An Act to amend the law as to the liability to national service. (Repealed by National Service Act 1948 (11 & 12 Geo. 6. c. 64))

== See also ==
- List of acts of the Parliament of the United Kingdom
