= Local Elections and Register of Electors (Temporary Provisions) Act 1939 =

Act of the Parliament of the United Kingdom

Local Elections and Register of Electors (Temporary Provisions) Act 1939 (Note: Section 10(1).)
- Act of Parliament
- Parliament of the United Kingdom
- Long title: An Act to postpone elections of local authorities, to postpone the preparation of the register of electors, to suspend certain powers relating to the alteration of the areas or of the constitution of local authorities, and for purposes connected with the matters aforesaid.
- Citation: 2 & 3 Geo. 6. c. 115
- Territorial extent: England and Wales; Scotland; Northern Ireland (section 9); (Note: Section 9(3).)

Dates
- Royal assent: 31 October 1939
- Commencement: 31 October 1939 (Note: The Acts of Parliament (Commencement) Act 1793.)
- Expired: 31 December 1940 (Note: Section 10(2).)
- Repealed: England and Wales and Scotland: 15 February 1945; Northern Ireland: 18 December 1953
Other legislation
Amended by	Local Elections and Register of Electors (Temporary Provisions) Act 1940; Local Elections and Register of Electors (Temporary Provisions) Act 1941; Local Elections and Register of Electors (Temporary Provisions) Act 1942; Local Elections and Register of Electors (Temporary Provisions) Act 1943; Local Elections and Register of Electors (Temporary Provisions) Act 1944
Repealed by	England and Wales and Scotland: Representation of the People Act 1945; Northern Ireland: Statute Law Revision Act 1953

Status: Repealed

Text of statute as originally enacted

Local Elections and Register of Electors (Temporary Provisions) Act 1940 (Note: Section 3.)
- Act of Parliament
- Parliament of the United Kingdom
- Long title: An Act to continue in force the Local Elections and Register of Electors (Temporary Provisions) Act, 1939, with certain amendments, and to make provision for safeguarding the rights of contributory employees and local Act contributors as defined by the Local Government Superannuation Act, 1937, and the Local Government Superannuation (Scotland) Act, 1937, in respect of remuneration lost in consequence of the first-mentioned Act.
- Citation: 4 & 5 Geo. 6. c. 3
- Territorial extent: United Kingdom

Dates
- Royal assent: 19 December 1940
- Commencement: 19 December 1940
- Expired: 31 December 1941 (Note: Section 1.)
- Repealed: Northern Ireland: 21 December 1954; England and Wales and Scotland: 31 July 1978
Other legislation
Amends	Local Elections and Register of Electors (Temporary Provisions) Act 1939
Amended by	Representation of the People Act 1945
Repealed by	Northern Ireland: Statute Law Revision Act (Northern Ireland) 1954; England and Wales and Scotland: Statute Law (Repeals) Act 1978

Status: Repealed

Text of statute as originally enacted

Local Elections and Register of Electors (Temporary Provisions) Act 1941 (Note: Section 2.)
- Act of Parliament
- Parliament of the United Kingdom
- Long title: An Act to continue in force the Local Elections and Register of Electors (Temporary Provisions) Act, 1939, as amended by the Local Elections and Register of Electors (Temporary Provisions) Act, 1940, and to make certain amendments of those Acts, including amendments modifying the qualifications of common councilmen of the City of London and the persons entitled to vote at elections of aldermen and common councilmen in the said City and postponing the preparation of ward lists in the said City.
- Citation: 4 & 5 Geo. 6. c. 49
- Territorial extent: United Kingdom

Dates
- Royal assent: 11 November 1941
- Commencement: 11 November 1941
- Expired: 31 December 1942
- Repealed: 15 February 1945
Other legislation
Amends	Local Elections and Register of Electors (Temporary Provisions) Act 1939
Repealed by	Representation of the People Act 1945

Status: Repealed

Text of statute as originally enacted

Local Elections and Register of Electors (Temporary Provisions) Act 1942
- Act of Parliament
- Parliament of the United Kingdom
- Long title: An Act to continue in force the Local Elections and Register of Electors (Temporary Provisions) Act, 1939, as amended by the Local Elections and Register of Electors (Temporary Provisions) Act, 1940, and the Local Elections and Register of Electors (Temporary Provisions) Act, 1941.
- Citation: 5 & 6 Geo. 6. c. 38
- Territorial extent: United Kingdom

Dates
- Royal assent: 22 October 1942
- Commencement: 22 October 1942
- Expired: 31 December 1943
- Repealed: 15 February 1945
Other legislation
Amends	Local Elections and Register of Electors (Temporary Provisions) Act 1939
Repealed by	Representation of the People Act 1945

Status: Repealed

Text of statute as originally enacted

Local Elections and Register of Electors (Temporary Provisions) Act 1943
- Act of Parliament
- Parliament of the United Kingdom
- Long title: An Act to continue in force the Local Elections and Register of Electors (Temporary Provisions) Act, 1939, as amended by subsequent Acts and subject to certain further amendments, and to amend section two of the Local Elections and Register of Electors (Temporary Provisions) Act, 1940.
- Citation: 7 & 8 Geo. 6. c. 2
- Territorial extent: United Kingdom

Dates
- Royal assent: 16 December 1943
- Commencement: 16 December 1943
- Expired: 31 December 1944 (Note: Section 1(1).)
- Repealed: 31 July 1978
Other legislation
Amends	Local Elections and Register of Electors (Temporary Provisions) Act 1939
Repealed by	Statute Law (Repeals) Act 1978

Status: Repealed

Text of statute as originally enacted

Local Elections and Register of Electors (Temporary Provisions) Act 1944
- Act of Parliament
- Parliament of the United Kingdom
- Long title: An Act to continue in force the Local Elections and Register of Electors (Temporary Provisions) Act, 1939.
- Citation: 8 & 9 Geo. 6. c. 3
- Territorial extent: United Kingdom

Dates
- Royal assent: 21 December 1944
- Commencement: 21 December 1944
- Expired: 31 March 1945
- Repealed: England and Wales and Scotland: 15 February 1945; Northern Ireland: 21 December 1954
Other legislation
Amends	Local Elections and Register of Electors (Temporary Provisions) Act 1939
Repealed by	England and Wales and Scotland: Representation of the People Act 1945; Northern Ireland: Statute Law Revision Act (Northern Ireland) 1954

Status: Repealed

Text of statute as originally enacted

The Local Elections and Register of Electors (Temporary Provisions) Act 1939 (2 & 3 Geo. 6. c. 115) was a act of the Parliament of the United Kingdom. The act was a piece of war time legislation that postponed local elections and the preparation of registers of electors. Initially the postponement was for one year, but the act was renewed annually until the electoral cycle was resumed in 1945 following the cessation of hostilities.

== Provisions ==
The act had ten sections.

- Section 1 provided that:

"While this Act is in force, no local election shall be held and any alderman, councillor or elective auditor in office at the commencement of this Act shall continue in office".

Where casual vacancies occurred, these were to be filled by the councils concerned who were given the power to appoint (or co-opt) any qualified person they wished.

- Section 2 provided that the registers of electors and jurors books in force in 1938 should remain valid
- Section 3 relieved the local authorities of the duty of compiling new registers and other duties concerned with local elections.
- Section 4 extended the postponement to the Common Council of the City of London.
- Section 5 dealt with newly incorporated municipal boroughs, which were due to have the first election of councillors on 1 November 1939. The section provided that the councillors of the predecessor urban or rural district would become borough councillors without the need for a fresh election. Where the number of councillors for the new borough exceeded those of the district council, the district councillors were given the power to appoint additional members. The new council was also to proceed with the election of aldermen as provided by their charter.
- Section 6 prevented changes to the areas or status of local authorities. Specifically it stated that no order could come into force that:
  - Altered or defined the boundaries of any county, borough, urban or rural district or parish
  - Divided any borough or urban district or parish into wards, or alter the boundaries of any ward in a borough or urban district or parish
  - Grouped any parishes or dissolved any group of parishes or established a separate parish council for any parish
  - Altered the boundaries of the electoral divisions of any county
  - Altered the number of councillors of any county council, borough council, urban or rural district council or parish council or dissolved any parish council
  - Formed a new urban or rural district or parish
  - Divided any county or urban or rural district or parish
  - United any county with any other county or with any county borough, or united any county borough with a county, or united any borough with any other borough, or united any urban or rural district with any other such district, whether urban or rural, or united any parish with another parish
  - Included in a borough an urban or rural district,
  - Transferred a part of a non-county borough to an urban or rural district, or transferred the whole or part of an urban or rural district to a non-county borough,
  - Transferred any part of an urban or rural district to another such district, whether urban or rural, or transferred any part of a parish to another parish
  - Converted any rural district or any part of a rural district into an urban district or any urban district or any part of an urban district into a rural district
- Section 7 dealt with the definitions of the various terms in the act
- Section 8 applied the act to Scotland, substituting the terms "burgh" and "district" where appropriate.
- Section 9 applied the act to Northern Ireland. Elections were not cancelled, but the Government of Northern Ireland was relieved of the responsibility of compiling a new register of electors.
- Section 10 gave the short title of the act, and provided that it would expire on 31 December 1940, with councillors and aldermen entitled to remain in office for six months after that date, or to such date as Parliament decided.

== Renewal ==
With the continuation of the war until 1945, the provisions of the 1939 legislation had to be renewed on five further occasions by the Local Elections and Register of Electors (Temporary Provisions) Acts of 1940, 1941, 1942, 1943, and 1944.

== Subsequent developments ==
The whole act, except section 9 and section 3 as it applies for the purposes of section 9, was repealed by section 40(2) of, and the fifth schedule to, the Representation of the People Act 1945 (8 & 9 Geo. 6. c. 5), which came into force on 15 February 1945.

The whole act, so far as unrepealed, was repealed for Northern Ireland by repealed by section 1 of, and the first schedule to, the Statute Law Revision Act 1953 (2 & 3 Eliz. 2. c. 5), which came into force on 18 December 1953.
