= List of acts of the Parliament of the United Kingdom from 1940 =

This is a complete list of acts of the Parliament of the United Kingdom for the year 1940.

Note that the first parliament of the United Kingdom was held in 1801; parliaments between 1707 and 1800 were either parliaments of Great Britain or of Ireland. For acts passed up until 1707, see the list of acts of the Parliament of England and the list of acts of the Parliament of Scotland. For acts passed from 1707 to 1800, see the list of acts of the Parliament of Great Britain. See also the list of acts of the Parliament of Ireland.

For acts of the devolved parliaments and assemblies in the United Kingdom, see the list of acts of the Scottish Parliament, the list of acts of the Northern Ireland Assembly, and the list of acts and measures of Senedd Cymru; see also the list of acts of the Parliament of Northern Ireland.

The number shown after each act's title is its chapter number. Acts passed before 1963 are cited using this number, preceded by the year(s) of the reign during which the relevant parliamentary session was held; thus the Union with Ireland Act 1800 is cited as "39 & 40 Geo. 3. c. 67", meaning the 67th act passed during the session that started in the 39th year of the reign of George III and which finished in the 40th year of that reign. Note that the modern convention is to use Arabic numerals in citations (thus "41 Geo. 3" rather than "41 Geo. III"). Acts of the last session of the Parliament of Great Britain and the first session of the Parliament of the United Kingdom are both cited as "41 Geo. 3". Acts passed from 1963 onwards are simply cited by calendar year and chapter number.

== 3 & 4 Geo. 6 ==
Continuing the fifth session of the 37th Parliament of the United Kingdom, which met from 28 November 1939 until 20 November 1940.

This session was also traditionally cited as 3 & 4 G. 6.

=== Public general acts ===
Short title	Citation	Royal assent
Long title
National Loans Act 1940 (repealed)	3 & 4 Geo. 6. c. 3	23 January 1940
An Act to extend the power of the Treasury to make rules under subsection (2) of section two of the National Loans Act, 1939. (Note: National Loans Act 1939 (2 & 3 Geo. 6. c. 117)) (Repealed by National Loans Act 1968 (c. 13))
Czecho-Slovakia (Financial Claims and Refugees) Act 1940 (repealed)	3 & 4 Geo. 6. c. 4	31 January 1940
An Act to provide for the disposal of the balances of certain banking accounts representing sums lent or given by His Majesty's Government in the United Kingdom to the Government of the Czecho-Slovak Republic. (Repealed by Statute Law (Repeals) Act 1981 (c. 19))
India and Burma (Miscellaneous Amendments) Act 1940 (repealed)	3 & 4 Geo. 6. c. 5	31 January 1940
An Act to amend the Government of India Act, 1935, (Note: Government of India Act 1935 (26 Geo. 5 & 1 Edw. 8. c. 2)) and the Government of Burma Act, 1935, (Note: Government of Burma Act 1935 (26 Geo. 5 & 1 Edw. 8. c. 3)) in certain respects, and to make a consequential amendment in the Naval Discipline Act; (Note: Naval Discipline Act 1866 (29 & 30 Vict. c. 109)) and for purposes connected with the matters aforesaid. (Repealed by Statute Law (Repeals) Act 1976 (c. 16))
Gas and Steam Vehicles (Excise Duties) Act 1940 (repealed)	3 & 4 Geo. 6. c. 6	31 January 1940
An Act to reduce certain duties of excise chargeable in respect of goods vehicles driven by gas or steam. (Repealed by Vehicles (Excise) Act 1949 (12, 13 & 14 Geo. 6. c. 89))
Trade Boards and Road Haulage Wages (Emergency Provisions) Act 1940 (repealed)	3 & 4 Geo. 6. c. 7	20 February 1940
An Act to empower the Minister of Labour and National Service, during the present emergency, to modify or suspend the operation of any of the provisions of the Trade Boards Acts, 1909 (Note: Trade Boards Act 1909 (9 Edw. 7. c. 22)) and 1918, (Note: Trade Boards Act 1918 (8 & 9 Geo. 5. c. 32)) and the Road Haulage Wages Act, 1938, (Note: Road Haulage Wages Act 1938 (1 & 2 Geo. 6. c. 44)) and to make provision with respect to any of the matters to which the said provisions relate; and to make a consequential amendment of the Holidays with Pay Act, 1938. (Note: Holidays with Pay Act 1938 (1 & 2 Geo. 6. c. 70)) (Repealed by Statute Law Revision Act 1953 (2 & 3 Eliz. 2. c. 5))
Mental Deficiency (Scotland) Act 1940 (repealed)	3 & 4 Geo. 6. c. 8	14 March 1940
An Act to amend the provisions of the Mental Deficiency and Lunacy (Scotland) Act, 1913, (Note: Mental Deficiency and Lunacy (Scotland) Act 1913 (3 & 4 Geo. 5. c. 38)) with regard to the duration of the detention of mental defectives in institutions or under guardianship. (Repealed by Mental Health (Scotland) Act 1960 (8 & 9 Eliz. 2. c. 61))
Cotton Industry Act 1940 (repealed)	3 & 4 Geo. 6. c. 9	14 March 1940
An Act to provide for establishing a board to perform certain services for the benefit of the cotton industry and certain other functions, for the making of payments by cotton spinners to meet the expenses of the board and to provide their contribution to the Empire Cotton Growing Corporation, and for purposes connected with the matters aforesaid. (Repealed by Statute Law Revision Act 1950 (14 Geo. 6. c. 6))
Industrial Assurance and Friendly Societies (Emergency Protection from Forfeiture) Act 1940 (repealed)	3 & 4 Geo. 6. c. 10	14 March 1940
An Act to protect from forfeiture industrial assurance policies and certain other assurance policies effected with registered friendly societies, in cases where default occurs in consequence of the war. (Repealed by Statute Law (Repeals) Act 1974 (c. 22))
Consolidated Fund (No. 1) Act 1940 (repealed)	3 & 4 Geo. 6. c. 11	21 March 1940
An Act to apply certain sums out of the Consolidated Fund to the service of the years ending on the thirty-first day of March, one thousand nine hundred and thirty-nine, one thousand nine hundred and forty and one thousand nine hundred and forty-one. (Repealed by Statute Law Revision Act 1950 (14 Geo. 6. c. 6))
Rating and Valuation (Postponement of Valuations) Act 1940 (repealed)	3 & 4 Geo. 6. c. 12	21 March 1940
An Act to postpone the making of new valuation lists for rating purposes in England, and for purposes connected therewith. (Repealed by Local Government Act 1948 (11 & 12 Geo. 6. c. 26))
Old Age and Widows' Pensions Act 1940 (repealed)	3 & 4 Geo. 6. c. 13	21 March 1940
An Act to reduce to sixty years the age at which women may become entitled to old age pensions under the enactments relating to widows', orphans' and old age contributory pensions; to provide for increasing certain contributions payable under those enactments; to make provision for supplementing, in cases of need, pensions payable under the said enactments to widows who have attained the age of sixty years, and old age pensions, and for making consequential adjustments in respect of the General Exchequer Grants payable to local authorities which are public assistance authorities; and for purposes connected with the matters aforesaid. (Repealed by National Assistance Act 1948 (11 & 12 Geo. 6. c. 29) and Superannuation Act 1972 (c. 11))
Agriculture (Miscellaneous War Provisions) Act 1940 (repealed)	3 & 4 Geo. 6. c. 14	21 March 1940
An Act to make certain amendments in the law relating to agriculture and agricultural land in connection with the present war. (Repealed by Statute Law (Repeals) Act 1993 (c. 50))
Solicitors (Emergency Provisions) Act 1940 (repealed)	3 & 4 Geo. 6. c. 15	25 April 1940
An Act to make special provision on account of circumstances arising out of the present emergency as to examinations and service under articles in the ease of persons desirous of being admitted as solicitors, as to the awarding of prizes, medals and scholarships by law societies, and as to the delegation of the powers of the Master of the Rolls under the enactments relating to solicitors; and for purposes connected with the matters aforesaid. (Repealed by Statute Law (Repeals) Act 1989 (c. 43))
Special Enactments (Extension of Time) Act 1940 (repealed)	3 & 4 Geo. 6. c. 16	25 April 1940
An Act to provide for extensions of time in relation to the discharge of duties imposed, or the exercise of powers conferred, by statutory provisions of a local or private nature, and in relation to the exercise of powers to purchase, or powers of re-entry exercisable in relation to, public utility undertakings. (Repealed by Statute Law (Repeals) Act 1971 (c. 52))
Agricultural Wages (Regulation) Amendment Act 1940 (repealed)	3 & 4 Geo. 6. c. 17	25 April 1940
An Act to provide for the fixing of a national minimum wage for men employed in agriculture by the week or longer; and for the duties of agricultural wages committees in connection therewith. (Repealed by Agricultural Wages (Regulation) Act 1947 (10 & 11 Geo. 6. c. 15))
Army and Air Force (Annual) Act 1940 (repealed)	3 & 4 Geo. 6. c. 18	25 April 1940
An Act to provide, during twelve months, for the discipline and regulation of the Army and the Air Force. (Repealed by Statute Law Revision Act 1950 (14 Geo. 6. c. 6), Statute Law Revision Act 1953 (2 & 3 Eliz. 2. c. 5) and Revision of the Army and Air Force Acts (Transitional Provisions) Act 1955 (3 & 4 Eliz. 2. c. 20))
Societies (Miscellaneous Provisions) Act 1940	3 & 4 Geo. 6. c. 19	25 April 1940
An Act to amend the law relating to trade unions, friendly societies, building societies and certain other societies for purposes connected with the present emergency, and to make further provision with respect to the amalgamation and transfer of engagements of trade unions and building societies.
Emergency Powers (Defence) Act 1940 (repealed)	3 & 4 Geo. 6. c. 20	22 May 1940
An Act to extend the powers which may be exercised by His Majesty under the Emergency Powers (Defence) Act, 1939. (Note: Emergency Powers (Defence) Act 1939 (2 & 3 Geo. 6. c. 62)) (Repealed by Statute Law Revision Act 1950 (14 Geo. 6. c. 6) and Statute Law Revision Act 1953 (2 & 3 Eliz. 2. c. 5))
Treachery Act 1940 (repealed)	3 & 4 Geo. 6. c. 21	23 May 1940
An Act to make further provision for the trial and punishment of treachery. (Repealed for England and Wales by Criminal Law Act 1967 (c. 58) and for Scotland and Northern Ireland by Statute Law (Repeals) Act 1973 (c. 39))
National Service (Armed Forces) Act 1940 (repealed)	3 & 4 Geo. 6. c. 22	23 May 1940
An Act to provide that persons shall not be exempted from liability under the National Service (Armed Forces) Act, 1939, (Note: National Service (Armed Forces) Act 1939 (2 & 3 Geo. 6. c. 81)) by reason of their being members of the Local Defence Volunteers. (Repealed by National Service Act 1947 (10 & 11 Geo. 6. c. 31) (Note: Incorrectly cited as "Nat Service, 1947 c 3" in the Chronological Table of the Statutes.))
National Loans (No. 2) Act 1940 (repealed)	3 & 4 Geo. 6. c. 23	30 May 1940
An Act to extend the powers of the Treasury to raise money under section one of the National Loans Act, 1939, and release them from contractual obligations to issue bearer bonder or bond certificates. (Repealed by Statute Law (Repeals) Act 1986 (c. 12))
National Service (Channel Islands) Act 1940 (repealed)	3 & 4 Geo. 6. c. 24	13 June 1940
An Act to provide for the enlistment of men called up in the Channel Islands for service in the armed forces of the Crown. (Repealed by Statute Law Revision Act 1958 (6 & 7 Eliz. 2. c. 46))
Post Office and Telegraph Act 1940 (repealed)	3 & 4 Geo. 6. c. 25	13 June 1940
An Act to amend the law with respect to the postage rates for newspapers, the rates for press telegrams, and charges under telegraph contracts, to enable special terms, conditions and rates to be prescribed for certain telegrams, and to enable certain contracts for publications at rates including portage to be determined. (Repealed by Telegraph Act 1962 (10 & 11 Eliz. 2. c. 14))
Superannuation Schemes (War Service) Act 1940	3 & 4 Geo. 6. c. 26	13 June 1940
An Act to enable provision to be made for preventing loss of benefits under certain superannuation schemes by persons undertaking service in the forces or employment for war purposes.
Agricultural Wages (Regulation) (Scotland) Act 1940 (repealed)	3 & 4 Geo. 6. c. 27	13 June 1940
An Act to amend the provisions of the Agricultural Wages (Regulation) (Scotland) Act, 1937, (Note: Agricultural Wages (Regulation) (Scotland) Act 1937 (1 Edw. 8 & 1 Geo. 6. c. 53)) relating to the power to direct reconsideration of minimum rates of wages, the constitution of the Scottish Agricultural Wages Board, and the appointment of chairmen of agricultural wages committees. (Repealed by Agricultural Wages (Regulation) Act 1947 (10 & 11 Geo. 6. c. 15))
Evidence and Powers of Attorney Act 1940	3 & 4 Geo. 6. c. 28	13 June 1940
An Act to empower certain officers and other persons to administer oaths and take affidavits, to facilitate the proof in criminal proceedings of documents intercepted in the post, and to make further provision as respects powers of attorney.
Finance Act 1940	3 & 4 Geo. 6. c. 29	27 June 1940
An Act to grant certain duties of Customs and Inland Revenue (including Excise), to alter other duties, and to amend the law relating to Customs and Inland Revenue (including Excise) and the National Debt, and to make further provision in connection with Finance.
Marriage (Scotland) (Emergency Provisions) Act 1940 (repealed)	3 & 4 Geo. 6. c. 30	27 June 1940
An Act to amend the Marriage Notice (Scotland) Act, 1878, (Note: Marriage Notice (Scotland) Act 1878 (41 & 42 Vict. c. 43)) in its application to persons engaged in war service. (Repealed by Statute Law Revision Act 1950 (14 Geo. 6. c. 6))
War Charities Act 1940 (repealed)	3 & 4 Geo. 6. c. 31	27 June 1940
An Act to provide for the registration and control of war charities, and for the extension of the objects of certain war charities; and for purposes connected with the matters aforesaid. (Repealed by Charities Act 1992 (c. 41))
Remission of Rates (London) Act 1940 (repealed)	3 & 4 Geo. 6. c. 32	27 June 1940
An Act to extend to London the power of rating authorities under the Rating and Valuation Act, 1925, (Note: Rating and Valuation Act 1925 (15 & 16 Geo. 5. c. 90)) to reduce or remit rates. (Repealed by London County Council (General Powers) Act 1949 (12, 13 & 14 Geo. 6. c. lv))
India and Burma (Emergency Provisions) Act 1940 (repealed)	3 & 4 Geo. 6. c. 33	27 June 1940
An Act to make emergency provision with respect to the government of India and Burma. (Repealed by Statute Law (Repeals) Act 1976 (c. 16))
Middlesex Deeds Act 1940	3 & 4 Geo. 6. c. 34	10 July 1940
An Act to provide for the closing for all purposes of the Middlesex Deeds Register, and for granting indemnities in respect of losses which may arise from the closing thereof; and for purposes connected with the matters aforesaid.
Indian and Colonial Divorce Jurisdiction Act 1940 (repealed)	3 & 4 Geo. 6. c. 35	10 July 1940
An Act to explain and amend the Indian and Colonial Divorce Jurisdiction Act, 1926. (Note: Indian and Colonial Divorce Jurisdiction Act 1926 (16 & 17 Geo. 5. c. 40)) (Repealed by Family Law Act 1986 (c. 55))
British North America Act 1940 known in Canada as the Constitution Act, 1940	3 & 4 Geo. 6. c. 36	10 July 1940
An Act to include unemployment insurance among the classes of subjects enumerated in section ninety-one of the British North America Act, 1867. (Note: British North America Act 1867 (30 & 31 Vict. c. 3))
Courts (Emergency Powers) Amendment Act 1940 (repealed)	3 & 4 Geo. 6. c. 37	10 July 1940
An Act to amend the Courts (Emergency Powers) Act, 1939. (Note: Courts (Emergency Powers) Act 1939 (2 & 3 Geo. 6. c. 67)) (Repealed by Courts (Emergency Powers) Act 1943 (6 & 7 Geo. 6. c. 19))
Truck Act 1940 (repealed)	3 & 4 Geo. 6. c. 38	10 July 1940
An Act to restrain legal proceedings under the Truck Acts 1831 to 1896 in respect of certain transactions heretofore effected which might lawfully have been effected in another form, and to remove doubts as to whether persons employed under contracts rendered illegal by those Acts are or were to be regarded for purposes other than those of the said Acts as employed under contracts of service. (Repealed by Wages Act 1986 (c. 48))
Consolidated Fund (No. 2) Act 1940 (repealed)	3 & 4 Geo. 6. c. 39	17 July 1940
An Act to apply a sum out of the Consolidated Fund to the service of the year ending on the thirty-first day of March, one thousand nine hundred and forty-one. (Repealed by Statute Law Revision Act 1950 (14 Geo. 6. c. 6))
Colonial Development and Welfare Act 1940 (repealed)	3 & 4 Geo. 6. c. 40	17 July 1940
An Act to make provision for promoting the development of the resources of colonies, protectorates, protected states and mandated territories and the welfare of their peoples, and for relieving colonial and other Governments from liability in respect of certain loans. (Repealed by Colonial Development and Welfare Act 1959 (7 & 8 Eliz. 2. c. 71))
Confirmation of Executors (War Service) (Scotland) Act 1940 (repealed)	3 & 4 Geo. 6. c. 41	17 July 1940
An Act to provide facilities in Scotland for the appointment and confirmation of executors of persons engaged in war service during the present war. (Repealed by Statute Law (Repeals) Act 1973 (c. 39))
Law Reform (Miscellaneous Provisions) (Scotland) Act 1940	3 & 4 Geo. 6. c. 42	17 July 1940
An Act to amend the law of Scotland relating to enforcement of decrees ad factum praestandum, to solatium and damages, to contribution among joint wrongdoers, and to prorogation of the jurisdiction of the Sheriff Court; to amend and extend the Intestate Husband's Estate (Scotland) Acts, 1911 (Note: Intestate Husband's Estate (Scotland) Act 1911 (1 & 2 Geo. 5. c. 10)) and 1919; (Note: Intestate Husband's Estate (Scotland) Act 1919 (9 & 10 Geo. 5. c. 9)) to make provision regarding the powers of the King's and Lord Treasurer's Remembrancer; to enable effect to be given to International Conventions affecting Scottish Courts; and to amend the law of Scotland relating to criminal procedure.
Merchant Shipping (Salvage) Act 1940 (repealed)	3 & 4 Geo. 6. c. 43	25 July 1940
An Act to amend the law with respect to the right of the Crown to claim salvage. (Repealed for England and Wales and Scotland by Crown Proceedings Act 1947 (10 & 11 Geo. 6. c. 44) and for Northern Ireland by Northern Ireland (Crown Proceedings) Order 1949 (SI 1949/1836))
Unemployment Insurance Act 1940 (repealed)	3 & 4 Geo. 6. c. 44	25 July 1940
An Act to increase the rates of benefit and contributions payable under the Unemployment Insurance Acts, 1935 to 1939, to amend section thirty-five of the Unemployment Insurance Act, 1935, (Note: Unemployment Insurance Act 1935 (25 & 26 Geo. 5. c. 8)) Part II of the First Schedule thereto, and section thirty-six of the Unemployment Assistance Act, 1934, (Note: Unemployment Act 1934 (24 & 25 Geo. 5. c. 29)) and for purposes connected with the matters aforesaid. (Repealed for England and Wales and Scotland by National Assistance Act 1948 (11 & 12 Geo. 6. c. 29) and for Northern Ireland by National Insurance Act (Northern Ireland) 1946 (c. 23 (N.I.)))
Emergency Powers (Defence) (No. 2) Act 1940 (repealed)	3 & 4 Geo. 6. c. 45	1 August 1940
An Act to remove doubts as to the extent of the powers which may be exercised by His Majesty under the Emergency Powers (Defence) Act, 1939. (Repealed by Statute Law Revision Act 1953 (2 & 3 Eliz. 2. c. 5))
Appropriation Act 1940 (repealed)	3 & 4 Geo. 6. c. 46	8 August 1940
An Act to apply a sum out of the Consolidated Fund to the service of the year ending on the thirty-first day of March, one thousand nine hundred and forty-one, and to appropriate the Supplies granted in this Session of Parliament. (Repealed by Statute Law Revision Act 1950 (14 Geo. 6. c. 6))
Workmen's Compensation (Supplementary Allowances) Act 1940 (repealed)	3 & 4 Geo. 6. c. 47	8 August 1940
An Act to provide for the payment of supplementary allowances to workmen entitled to weekly payments by way of compensation under the Workmen's Compensation Act, 1925, (Note: Workmen's Compensation Act 1925 (15 & 16 Geo. 5. c. 84)) and for purposes connected therewith. (Repealed by National Insurance (Industrial Injuries) Act 1946 (9 & 10 Geo. 6. c. 62))
Finance (No. 2) Act 1940	3 & 4 Geo. 6. c. 48	22 August 1940
An Act to increase certain duties of customs and excise; to increase the standard rate of income tax for the year 1940-41 and the higher rates of income tax for the year 1939-40; to make certain amendments in the enactments relating to income tax, national defence contribution and excess profits tax; to increase the rates of estate duty; to impose a purchase tax; and for purposes connected with the matters aforesaid.
Isle of Man (Customs) Act 1940 (repealed)	3 & 4 Geo. 6. c. 49	22 August 1940
An Act to amend the law with respect to customs in the Isle of Man. (Repealed by Isle of Man (Customs) Act 1942 (5 & 6 Geo. 6. c. 25), Isle of Man (Customs) Act 1949 (12, 13 & 14 Geo. 6. c. 58), Statute Law Revision Act 1950 (14 Geo. 6. c. 6) and Statute Law Revision Act 1953 (2 & 3 Eliz. 2. c. 5))
Agriculture (Miscellaneous War Provisions) (No. 2) Act 1940 (repealed)	3 & 4 Geo. 6. c. 50	22 August 1940
An Act to make certain amendments in the law relating to agriculture and agricultural land in connection with the present war. (Repealed by Statute Law (Repeals) Act 1993 (c. 50))
Allied Forces Act 1940 (repealed)	3 & 4 Geo. 6. c. 51	22 August 1940
An Act to make provision with respect to the discipline and internal administration of certain allied and associated forces, and for the application in relation to those forces of the Visiting Forces (British Commonwealth) Act, 1933, (Note: Visiting Forces (British Commonwealth) Act 1933 (23 & 24 Geo. 5. c. 6)) the Naval Discipline Act, the Army Act (Note: Army Act 1881 (44 & 45 Vict. c. 58)) and the Air Force Act. (Note: Air Force (Constitution) Act 1917 (7 & 8 Geo. 5. c. 51)) (Repealed by Visiting Forces Act 1952 (15 & 16 Geo. 6 & 1 Eliz. 2. c. 67))
Consolidated Fund (No. 3) Act 1940 (repealed)	3 & 4 Geo. 6. c. 52	24 October 1940
An Act to apply a sum out of the Consolidated Fund to the service of the year ending on the thirty-first day of March, one thousand nine hundred and forty-one. (Repealed by Statute Law Revision Act 1950 (14 Geo. 6. c. 6))
Prolongation of Parliament Act 1940 (repealed)	3 & 4 Geo. 6. c. 53	6 November 1940
An Act to extend the duration of the present Parliament. (Repealed by Statute Law Revision Act 1950 (14 Geo. 6. c. 6))
Appropriation (No. 2) Act 1940 (repealed)	3 & 4 Geo. 6. c. 54	20 November 1940
An Act to apply a sum out of the Consolidated Fund to the service of the year ending on the thirty-first day of March, one thousand nine hundred and forty-one, and to appropriate the further Supplies granted in this Session of Parliament. (Repealed by Statute Law Revision Act 1950 (14 Geo. 6. c. 6))
Securities (Validation) Act 1940 (repealed)	3 & 4 Geo. 6. c. 55	20 November 1940
An Act to resolve doubts as to the extent of certain restrictions affecting securities and to validate certain securities as respects which the restrictions were not complied with. (Repealed by Statute Law (Repeals) Act 1971 (c. 52))
Workmen's Compensation and Benefit (Byssinosis) Act 1940 (repealed)	3 & 4 Geo. 6. c. 56	20 November 1940
An Act to provide for the payment of compensation or disablement benefit in the case of male workmen who have died from, or become totally and permanently incapacitated for work as the result of, the respiratory disease known as byssinosis; and for purposes connected with the matters aforesaid. (Repealed by National Insurance (Industrial Injuries) Act 1946 (9 & 10 Geo. 6. c. 62) and Family Allowances and National Insurance Act 1961 (10 & 11 Eliz. 2. c. 6))

=== Local acts ===
Short title	Citation	Royal assent
Long title
Dumbarton Burgh Order Confirmation Act 1940	3 & 4 Geo. 6. c. i	14 March 1940
An Act to confirm a Provisional Order under the Private Legislation Procedure (Scotland) Act 1936 (Note: Private Legislation Procedure (Scotland) Act 1936 (26 Geo. 5 & 1 Edw. 8. c. 52)) relating to Dumbarton Burgh.
	Dumbarton Burgh Order 1939 (Note: Although passed in 1940, the short title is specified as the Dumbarton Burgh Order 1939.) Provisional Order to extend the boundaries of the burgh of Dumbarton to make provision with respect to the local government and health of the burgh and for other purposes.	
Glasgow Water and Tramways Order Confirmation Act 1940 (repealed)	3 & 4 Geo. 6. c. ii	14 March 1940
An Act to confirm a Provisional Order under the Private Legislation Procedure (Scotland) Act 1936 relating to Glasgow Water and Tramways. (Repealed by Glasgow Corporation Consolidation (Water, Transport and Markets) Order Confirmation Act 1964 (c. xliii))
	Glasgow Water and Tramways Order 1939 (Note: Although passed in 1940, the short title is specified as the Glasgow Water and Tramways Order 1939.) Provisional Order to authorise the corporation of the city of Glasgow to construct waterworks and tramways and to borrow money for their water and tramway undertakings and to confer further powers on the Corporation with respect to those undertakings and for other purposes.	
Aberdeen Corporation (Administration Finance &c.) Order Confirmation Act 1940	3 & 4 Geo. 6. c. iii	14 March 1940
An Act to confirm a Provisional Order under the Private Legislation Procedure (Scotland) Act 1936 relating to Aberdeen Corporation (Administration, Finance, &c.).
	Aberdeen Corporation (Administration, Finance, &c.) Order 1939 (Note: Although passed in 1940, the short title is specified as the Aberdeen Corporation (Administration, Finance, &c.) Order 1939.) Provisional Order to consolidate with amendments the Acts and Orders of or relating to the corporation of the city and royal burgh of Aberdeen in respect of police fire brigade municipal buildings authorised street improvements and bridge works and lands in connection therewith general administrative provisions finance and the appointment and duties of officers and servants and other matters relating to the local government of the city and to confer further powers upon the Corporation with respect thereto to make further provision for the local government health and improvement of the city and for other purposes.	
Ministry of Health Provisional Order Confirmation (Canterbury) Act 1940 (repealed)	3 & 4 Geo. 6. c. iv	21 March 1940
An Act to confirm a provisional order of the Minister of Health relating to the city of Canterbury. (Repealed by County of Kent Act 1981 (c. xviii))
	Canterbury Order 1939 (Note: Although passed in 1940, the short title is specified as the Canterbury Order 1939.) Provisional order partially repealing a local Act. (Note: Canterbury Market Act 1824 (5 Geo. 4. c. cxxxiv))	
Ministry of Health Provisional Order Confirmation (Ilkley) Act 1940 (repealed)	3 & 4 Geo. 6. c. v	21 March 1940
An Act to confirm a provisional order of the Minister of Health relating to Ilkley. (Repealed by West Yorkshire Act 1980 (c. xiv))
	Ilkley Order 1939 (Note: Although passed in 1940, the short title is specified as the Ilkley Order 1939.) Provisional order partially repealing a local Act. (Note: Ilkley Local Board Act 1893 (56 & 57 Vict. c. xlvii))	
Ely Cathedral Canonries Act 1940	3 & 4 Geo. 6. c. vi	25 April 1940
An Act to disannex from the Regius Professorship of Divinity in the University of Cambridge the Ely Canonry now annexed thereto and for other purposes.
Newcastle and Gateshead Waterworks Act 1940 (repealed)	3 & 4 Geo. 6. c. vii	25 April 1940
An Act to increase the powers of the Newcastle and Gateshead Water Company of raising money by borrowing on mortgage or by the creation and issue of debenture stock to extend the time for the completion of certain authorised works and for other purposes. (Repealed by Newcastle and Gateshead Water (Consolidation etc.) Order 1982 (SI 1982/1718))
Royal Society for the Prevention of Cruelty to Animals Act 1940	3 & 4 Geo. 6. c. viii	25 April 1940
An Act to empower the Royal Society for the Prevention of Cruelty to Animals to acquire and hold lands and for other purposes.
King Edward the Seventh Welsh National Memorial Association Act 1940 (repealed)	3 & 4 Geo. 6. c. ix	25 April 1940
An Act to make provisions with respect to the war service of persons employed by the King Edwards the Seventh Welsh National Memorial Association and for other purposes. (Repealed by National Health Service (Superannuation) Regulations 1947 (SR&O 1947/1755))
Torquay Cemetery Act 1940 (repealed)	3 & 4 Geo. 6. c. x	22 May 1940
An Act to enable the Torquay Cemetery Company to enlarge their cemetery and for other purposes. (Repealed by Torbay Corporation Act 1971 (c. xxxiii))
Staffordshire and Worcestershire Canal Act 1940	3 & 4 Geo. 6. c. xi	22 May 1940
An Act to confer further powers on the Staffordshire and Worcestershire Canal Company and for other purposes.
Wessex Electricity Act 1940	3 & 4 Geo. 6. c. xii	22 May 1940
An Act to confer further powers on the Wessex Electricity Company and for other purposes.
Commercial Gas Act 1940	3 & 4 Geo. 6. c. xiii	22 May 1940
An Act to confer further powers upon the Commercial Gas Company and for other purposes.
Brighton Marine Palace and Pier Act 1940	3 & 4 Geo. 6. c. xiv	22 May 1940
An Act to amend in certain respects the Brighton Marine Palace and Pier Acts 1888 (Note: Brighton Marine Palace and Pier Act 1888 (51 & 52 Vict. c. clxxii)) and 1893 (Note: Brighton Marine Palace and Pier Act 1893 (56 & 57 Vict. c. clv)) and for other purposes.
London County Council (General Powers) Act 1940 (repealed)	3 & 4 Geo. 6. c. xv	22 May 1940
An Act to confer powers upon the London County Council and other authorities and for other purposes. (Repealed by Ministry of Housing and Local Government Provisional Order Confirmation (Greater London Parks and Open Spaces) Act 1967 (c. xxix))
Northallerton Urban District Council Act 1940	3 & 4 Geo. 6. c. xvi	22 May 1940
An Act to enable the urban district council of Northallerton to construct further waterworks to vary the existing provisions in regard to the abstraction of water by the Council from streams they are authorised to appropriate to confer further powers upon the Council in regard to their water undertaking and for other purposes.
Poor's Allotments in Hornsey Charity Scheme Confirmation Act 1940	3 & 4 Geo. 6. c. xvii	13 June 1940
An Act to confirm a Scheme of the Charity Commissioners for the application or management of the charity called the Poor's Allotments in the ancient parish of Hornsey in the county of Middlesex.
	Scheme for the application or management of the Charity known as the Poor's Allotments in the ancient parish of Hornsey in the County of Middlesex comprised in an Inclosure Award dated the 14th June 1816 made in pursuance of the Hornsey Inclosure Act 53 Geo. III. cap. vii. (Note: Hornsey (Middlesex) Inclosure Act 1813 (53 Geo. 3. c. 7))	
Ministry of Health Provisional Order Confirmation (Blackburn) Act 1940 (repealed)	3 & 4 Geo. 6. c. xviii	13 June 1940
An Act to confirm a provisional order of the Minister of Health relating to the county borough of Blackburn. (Repealed by County of Lancashire Act 1984 (c. xxi))
	Blackburn Order 1940 Provisional order altering a local Act. (Note: Blackburn Corporation Act 1908 (8 Edw. 7. c. xcv))	
Birmingham Corporation Act 1940	3 & 4 Geo. 6. c. xix	13 June 1940
An Act to empower the lord mayor aldermen and citizens of the city of Birmingham to construct waterworks to make further provision in reference to the Birmingham Municipal Officers' Widows' and Orphans' Pensions Scheme and for other purposes.
Coventry Corporation Act 1940 (repealed)	3 & 4 Geo. 6. c. xx	13 June 1940
An Act to empower the mayor aldermen and citizens of the city of Coventry to construct and maintain waterworks and take water from the river Avon to extend the time for the purchase of lands needed for certain street works to alter the qualification of apprentices serving during the period of the present emergency in the Navy the Army or the Air Force for the freedom of the city and for other purposes. (Repealed by West Midlands County Council Act 1980 (c. xi))
Cornwall Electric Power Act 1940	3 & 4 Geo. 6. c. xxi	13 June 1940
An Act to confer further powers on the Cornwall Electric Power Company and for other purposes.
London County Council (Money) Act 1940 (repealed)	3 & 4 Geo. 6. c. xxii	13 June 1940
An Act to regulate the expenditure on capital account and lending of money by the London County Council during the financial period from the first day of April one thousand nine hundred and forty to the thirtieth day of September one thousand nine hundred and forty-one and for other purposes. (Repealed by London County Council (Loans) Act 1955 (4 & 5 Eliz. 2. c. xxvi))
South Suburban Gas Act 1940	3 & 4 Geo. 6. c. xxiii	13 June 1940
An Act to confer further powers upon the South Suburban Gas Company and for other purposes.
Lochaber Water Power Order Confirmation Act 1940	3 & 4 Geo. 6. c. xxiv	27 June 1940
An Act to confirm a Provisional Order under the Private Legislation Procedure (Scotland) Act 1936 relating to the Lochaber Power Company.
	Lochaber Water Power Order 1940 Provisional Order to confer further powers upon the Lochaber Power Company and for other purposes.	
Ministry of Health Provisional Order Confirmation (Littlestone-on-Sea and District Water) Act 1940	3 & 4 Geo. 6. c. xxv	27 June 1940
An Act to confirm a provisional order of the Minister of Health relating to the Littlestone-on-Sea and District Water Company.
	Littlestone-on-Sea and District Water Order 1940 Provisional Order under the Gas and Water Works Facilities Act 1870 (Note: Gas and Water Works Facilities Act 1870 (33 & 34 Vict. c. 70)) and the Gas and Water Works Facilities Act 1870 Amendment Act 1873 (Note: Gas and Water Works Facilities Act 1870 Amendment Act 1873 (36 & 37 Vict. c. 89)) empowering the Littlestone-on-Sea and District Water Company to maintain waterworks to extend their limits of supply to raise additional capital and for other purposes.	
Ministry of Health Provisional Order Confirmation (Norwich) Act 1940 (repealed)	3 & 4 Geo. 6. c. xxvi	27 June 1940
An Act to confirm a provisional order of the Minister of Health relating to the city of Norwich. (Repealed by Norwich City Council Act 1984 (c. xxiii))
	Norwich Order 1940 Provisional order amending certain local Acts and a provisional order.	
Ministry of Health Provisional Order Confirmation (Thirsk District Water) Act 1940	3 & 4 Geo. 6. c. xxvii	27 June 1940
An Act to confirm a provisional order of the Minister of Health relating to the Thirsk District Water Company Limited.
	Thirsk District Water Order 1940 Provisional Order under the Gas and Water Works Facilities Act 1870 and the Gas and Water Works Facilities Act 1870 Amendment Act 1873 to make further provision as to the capital and borrowing powers of the Thirsk District Water Company Limited and for other purposes.	
Bournemouth Gas and Water Act 1940	3 & 4 Geo. 6. c. xxviii	27 June 1940
An Act to authorise the Bournemouth Gas and Water Company to construct additional waterworks to confer further powers upon that company and for other purposes.
Farnham Gas and Electricity Act 1940	3 & 4 Geo. 6. c. xxix	27 June 1940
An Act to authorise the Farnham Gas and Electricity Company to raise additional capital to confer further powers upon that company and for other purposes.
Christchurch Corporation Act 1940	3 & 4 Geo. 6. c. xxx	10 July 1940
An Act to make further and better provision for the improvement health local government and finances of the borough of Christchurch and for other purposes.
Gosport Water Act 1940	3 & 4 Geo. 6. c. xxxi	10 July 1940
An Act to authorise the Gosport Waterworks Company to construct additional works to authorise the transfer to the Company of part of the water undertaking of the mayor aldermen and burgesses of the borough of Southampton to extend the limits of supply of the Company to confer upon the Company further capital and borrowing powers and for other purposes.
Monmouthshire and South Wales Employers' Mutual Indemnity Society Act 1940	3 & 4 Geo. 6. c. xxxii	10 July 1940
An Act to enable the Monmouthshire and South Wales Employers' Mutual Indemnity Society Limited to make special calls upon its members to confer upon it preferential rights in certain events and to empower it to make certain agreements with its members and for other purposes.
Wey Valley Water Act 1940	3 & 4 Geo. 6. c. xxxiii	10 July 1940
An Act to empower the Wey Valley Water Company to construct further works and to raise additional capital to extend their limits of supply to confer additional powers upon the Company and for other purposes.
Taunton Corporation Act 1940	3 & 4 Geo. 6. c. xxxiv	10 July 1940
An Act to empower the mayor aldermen and burgesses of the borough of Taunton to construct additional waterworks and to purchase land therefor to confer further powers on the Corporation with regard to the health local government and improvement of the borough and for other purposes.
Saint Mary Magdalene Hospital (Newcastle-upon-Tyne) Act 1940 (repealed)	3 & 4 Geo. 6. c. xxxv	10 July 1940
An Act to amend the Act 30 & 31 Vict. c. vii. (Note: St. Mary Magdalene Hospital, Newcastle-upon-Tyne Act 1867 (30 & 31 Vict. c. vii)) to confer upon the lord mayor aldermen and citizens of the city and county of Newcastle-upon-Tyne further powers and to make further provisions with respect to the hospital of Saint Mary Magdalene in the said city and county and for other purposes. (Repealed by Statute Law (Repeals) Act 2013 (c. 2))
Cardiff Corporation (Trolley Vehicles) Order Confirmation Act 1940	3 & 4 Geo. 6. c. xxxvi	17 July 1940
An Act to confirm a Provisional Order made by the Minister of Transport under the Cardiff Corporation Act 1934 (Note: Cardiff Corporation Act 1934 (24 & 25 Geo. 5. c. xcv)) relating to Cardiff Corporation trolley vehicles.
	Cardiff Corporation (Trolley Vehicles) Order 1940 Order authorising the lord mayor aldermen and citizens of the city of Cardiff to use trolley vehicles upon additional routes in the said city and county.	
Huddersfield Corporation (Trolley Vehicles) Order Confirmation Act 1940 (repealed)	3 & 4 Geo. 6. c. xxxvii	17 July 1940
An Act to confirm a Provisional Order made by the Minister of Transport under the Huddersfield Corporation Act 1936 (Note: Huddersfield Corporation (Trolley Vehicles) Act 1936 (26 Geo. 5 & 1 Edw. 8. c. liii)) relating to Huddersfield Corporation trolley vehicles. (Repealed by West Yorkshire Act 1980 (c. xiv))
	Huddersfield Corporation (Trolley Vehicles) Order 1940 Order authorising the mayor aldermen and burgesses of the borough of Huddersfield to use trolley vehicles upon additional routes in the borough of Huddersfield.	
Newcastle-upon-Tyne (Trolley Vehicles) Order Confirmation Act 1940 (repealed)	3 & 4 Geo. 6. c. xxxviii	17 July 1940
An Act to confirm a Provisional Order made by the Minister of Transport under the Newcastle-upon-Tyne Corporation (General Powers) Act 1935 (Note: Newcastle-upon-Tyne Corporation (General Powers) Act 1935 (25 & 26 Geo. 5. c. cxxiv)) relating to Newcastle-upon-Tyne Corporation trolley vehicles. (Repealed by Tyne and Wear Act 1980 (c. xliii))
	Newcastle-upon-Tyne Corporation (Trolley Vehicles) Order 1940 Order authorising the lord mayor aldermen and citizens of the city and county of Newcastle-upon-Tyne to use trolley vehicles upon additional routes in the said city and county.	
South-Eastern Gas Corporation (Associated Companies) Act 1940	3 & 4 Geo. 6. c. xxxix	17 July 1940
An Act to confer further powers upon the Ascot District Gas and Electricity Company and other companies authorised to supply gas and for other purposes.
Newcastle-upon-Tyne and Gateshead Gas Act 1940	3 & 4 Geo. 6. c. xl	25 July 1940
An Act to provide for the transfer to the Newcastle-upon-Tyne and Gateshead Gas Company of the undertaking of the Morpeth Gas Light Company (1902) Limited to extend the limits of supply of the Newcastle-upon-Tyne and Gateshead Gas Company and for other purposes.
Mid-Wessex Water Act 1940	3 & 4 Geo. 6. c. xli	25 July 1940
An Act to authorise the Mid-Wessex Water Company to execute works and acquire lands and easements to confer upon the Company further capital and borrowing powers and for other purposes.
Clyde Lighthouses Consolidation Order Confirmation Act 1940 (repealed)	3 & 4 Geo. 6. c. xlii	6 November 1940
An Act to confirm a Provisional Order under the Private Legislation (Scotland) Act 1936 relating to Clyde Lighthouses. (Repealed by Statute Law (Repeals) Act 1986 (c. 12))
	Clyde Lighthouses Consolidation Order 1940 Provisional Order to consolidate with amendments the Acts and Order of or relating to the Trustees of the Clyde Lighthouses to authorise the said Trustees to execute improvements of the navigation of the River or Firth of Clyde and for other purposes.	
Fife County Council Order Confirmation Act 1940	3 & 4 Geo. 6. c. xliii	6 November 1940
An Act to confirm a Provisional Order under the Private Legislation (Scotland) Act 1936 relating to Fife County Council.
	Fife County Council Order 1940 Provisional Order to consolidate with amendments the Acts and Orders relating to the supply of water by the county council of the county of Fife to transfer to the County Council the undertaking of the Wemyss and District Water Trustees to authorise the County Council to acquire lands and construct water and sewerage works to confer further powers upon the County Council with regard to their water undertaking and in relation to drainage buildings cleansing public health weights and measures the control of camping grounds and other matters to empower the County Council to borrow money and make provision for the finance of the county and for other purposes.	
Ayr Burgh Order Confirmation Act 1940	3 & 4 Geo. 6. c. xliv	20 November 1940
An Act to confirm a Provisional Order under the Private Legislation (Scotland) Act 1936 relating to Ayr Burgh.
	Ayr Burgh Order 1940 Provisional Order to revive the powers for the compulsory purchase of lands for the purposes of the dam or weir authorised by the Ayr Burgh Extension &c. Order 1935 to confer further powers upon the provost magistrates and councillors of the burgh of Ayr with regard to the removal and disposal of refuse and the control of the sale of ice-cream and for other purposes.	

== 4 & 5 Geo. 6 ==
The sixth session of the 37th Parliament of the United Kingdom, which met from 21 November 1940 until 11 November 1941.

This session was also traditionally cited as 4 & 5 G. 6.

=== Public general acts ===
Short title	Citation	Royal assent
Long title
Scottish Fisheries Advisory Council Act 1940 (repealed)	4 & 5 Geo. 6. c. 1	19 December 1940
An Act to remove the limit on the number of members of the Scottish Fisheries Advisory Council constituted under the Reorganisation of Offices (Scotland) Act, 1939. (Note: Reorganisation of Offices (Scotland) Act 1939 (2 & 3 Geo. 6. c. 20)) (Repealed by Sea Fish Industry Act 1951 (14 & 15 Geo. 6. c. 30) (Note: Incorrectly cited as "Sea Fish Industry 1961 c 30" in the Chronological Table of the Statutes.))
Expiring Laws Continuance Act 1940 (repealed)	4 & 5 Geo. 6. c. 2	19 December 1940
An Act to continue certain expiring laws. (Repealed by Statute Law Revision Act 1950 (14 Geo. 6. c. 6))
Local Elections and Register of Electors (Temporary Provisions) Act 1940 (repealed)	4 & 5 Geo. 6. c. 3	19 December 1940
An Act to continue in force the Local Elections and Register of Electors (Temporary Provisions) Act, 1939, (Note: Local Elections and Register of Electors (Temporary Provisions) Act 1939 (2 & 3 Geo. 6. c. 115)) with certain amendments, and to make provision for safeguarding the rights of contributory employees and local Act contributors as defined by the Local Government Superannuation Act, 1937, (Note: Local Government Superannuation Act 1937 (1 Edw. 8 & 1 Geo. 6. c. 68)) and the Local Government Superannuation (Scotland) Act, 1937, (Note: Local Government Superannuation (Scotland) Act 1937 (1 Edw. 8 & 1 Geo. 6. c. 69)) in respect of remuneration lost in consequence of the first-mentioned Act. (Repealed for Northern Ireland by Statute Law Revision Act (Northern Ireland) 1954 (c. 35 (N.I.)) and for England and Wales and Scotland by Statute Law (Repeals) Act 1978 (c. 45))
Naval and Marine Forces (Temporary Release from Service) Act 1940 (repealed)	4 & 5 Geo. 6. c. 4	19 December 1940
An Act to provide for the release and recall of men serving in the royal navy or the royal marine forces. (Repealed by Navy, Army and Air Force Reserves Act 1954 (2 & 3 Eliz. 2. c. 10))
Railways Agreement (Powers) Act 1940 (repealed)	4 & 5 Geo. 6. c. 5	19 December 1940
An Act to enable railway undertakers under the control of the Minister of Transport to make agreements with him and with one another providing for financial matters arising out of, and in connection with, such control; and for purposes connected therewith. (Repealed by Statute Law Revision Act 1953 (2 & 3 Eliz. 2. c. 5))

== See also ==
- List of acts of the Parliament of the United Kingdom
