= Statute Law Revision Act 1953 =

Act of the Parliament of the United Kingdom

Statute Law Revision Act 1953 (Note: Section 5.)
- Act of Parliament
- Parliament of the United Kingdom
- Long title: An Act for further promoting the Revision of the Statute Law by repealing Enactments which have ceased to be in force or have become unnecessary and by correcting certain errors in the First Schedule to the Statute Law Revision Act, 1950, and for facilitating the publication of Revised Editions of the Statutes.
- Citation: 2 & 3 Eliz. 2. c. 5
- Territorial extent: United Kingdom

Dates
- Royal assent: 18 December 1953
- Commencement: 18 December 1953 (Note: The Acts of Parliament (Commencement) Act 1793.)
Other legislation
| Amends | Statute Law Revision Act 1950 |
| Amended by | Agriculture Act 1957; Courts Act 1971; Northern Ireland Constitution Act 1973; Statute Law (Repeals) Act 1974; Administration of Justice Act 1977; Statute Law (Repeals) Act 1998 |
| Relates to | Repeal of Obsolete Statutes Act 1856; See Statute Law Revision Act |

Status: Partially repealed

Text of statute as originally enacted

The Statute Law Revision Act 1953 (2 & 3 Eliz. 2. c. 5) is an act of the Parliament of the United Kingdom.

As of 2026, the act remains partly in the United Kingdom.

The effect of this act is set out in the Report of the Joint Committee on Consolidation and Statute Law Revision Bills, with the proceedings and minutes of evidence, dated 19 November 1953.

== Provisions ==
=== Repealed enactments ===
Section 1 of the act repealed 495 enactments, listed in the first, second and third schedules to the act.

==== First schedule: Acts of the Parliaments of England, Great Britain and the United Kingdom ====
First schedule — Acts of the Parliaments of England, Great Britain and the United Kingdom
| Citation | Short title | Description | Extent of repeal |
|---|---|---|---|
| 20 Hen. 3. c. 4 | Commons Act 1236 | The Commons Act, 1236. | The whole act. |
| 13 Edw. 1 | Statuta Civitatis London | Statuta Civitatis Londoñ. | The whole act. |
| 21 Edw. 1 (Note: The is the citation in The Statutes of the Realm) | Statutum de Justiciariis Assignatis | Ordinances of the King, sent 12th July, 1293, to be performed and observed in his land of Ireland. | The third, fourth, fifth and sixth. |
| 28 Edw. 1. c. 12 | Distress for Crown debt | Distresses for the King's debt. | The whole chapter. |
| 2 Hen. 6. c. 17 | Quality and Marks of Silver Work Act 1423 | The Fineness of Harness of Silver, and the Marks with which it shall be marked. | The whole act. |
| 12 Hen. 7. c. 9 | Queen's Dower Act 1496 | An Act for the Assurance of the Queen's Jointure. | The whole act. |
| 12 Hen. 7. c. 10 | Annuity of Earl of Surrey Act 1496 | An Act for the Earl of Surrey. | The whole act. |
| 1 Hen. 8. c. 15 | Lands of Empson and Dudley Act 1509 | An Acte concerning lands made in trust to Empson and Dudley. | The whole act. |
| 1 Hen. 8. c. 18 | Dower of Queen Katherine Act 1509 | An Act for Confirmation of Letters Patents made to Quene Katheryn for her Dower. | The whole act. |
| 7 Hen. 8. c. 8 | French Queen's Jointure (on Marriage to Duke of Suffolk) Act 1515 | The French Quenes Joyntour. | The whole act. |
| 14 & 15 Hen. 8. c. 22 | Allowance to Duchess of Buckingham Act 1523 | An Acte concernyng the Duches of Buckingham. | The whole act. |
| 27 Hen. 8. c. 41 | Assurance of Lands to Queen Anne for her life Act 1535 | An Acte concernyng the assuraunce of the Maner of Hasyllegh unto the Quenes Grace for terme of her lyffe. | The whole act. |
| 1 Edw. 6. c. 1 | Sacrament Act 1547 | The Sacrament Act, 1547. | Section eight, in so far as it extends to Northern Ireland. |
| 5 & 6 Edw. 6. c. 15 | Regratours of Tanned Leather Act 1551 | An Acte against the Regratours of tanned Lether. | The whole act, so far as unrepealed. |
| 1 Eliz. 1. c. 1 | Act of Supremacy 1558 | The Act of Supremacy. | The whole act, so far as unrepealed, in so far as it extends to Northern Ireland. |
| 13 Eliz. 1. c. 12 | Ordination of Ministers Act 1571 | The Ordination of Ministers Act, 1571. | The whole act, in so far as it extends to Northern Ireland. |
| 13 Cha. 2. St. 1. c. 7 | Confirmation of Acts Act 1661 | An Act for confirming Publique Acts. | The words " one Act Entituled An Act of Free and Generall Pardon Indempnity and Oblivion ", " One other Act Entituled An Act for Confirmation of Judicial Proceedings ", and " One other Act Entituled An Act for the Attainder of severall Persons guilty of the horrid Murder of His late Sacred Majesty King Charles the First One other Act Entituled an Act for erecting and establishing a Post Office ", in so far as they extend to Northern Ireland. |
| 13 Cha. 2. St. 1. c. 14 | Confirmation of Acts (No. 3) Act 1661 | An Act for Confirming an Act Entituled An Act for encouraging and encreasing of Shipping and Navigation and severall other Acts both publique and private mentioned therein. | The words " One Act Entituled An Act for the encouraging and encreasing of Shipping and Navigation ", in so far as they extend to Northern Ireland. |
| 1 Ja. 2. c. 17 | Administration of Intestates' Estate Act 1685 | An Act for Reviveing and Continuance of severall Acts of Parlyament therein mentioned. | Section thirteen, in so far as it extends to Northern Ireland. |
| 10 Will. 3. c. 23 | Suppression of Lotteries Act 1698 | An Act for suppressing of Lotteries. | In section two, and in section three, the words from " to be recovered " to the end of the section, where each time occurring, in so far as they extend to Northern Ireland. |
| 7 Ann. c. 32 | Commissioners of Sewers (City of London) Act 1708 | An Act for giving the Commissioners of Sewers for the City of London the same Powers as the Commissioners of Sewers for Counties have and to oblige Collectors for the Sewers to account. | The whole act. |
| 9 Ann. c. 6 | Lotteries Act 1710 | The Lotteries Act, 1710. | In section fifty-seven, the words from " to be recovered by information " to the end of the section, in so far as they extend to Northern Ireland. |
| 8 Geo. 1. c. 2 | Lotteries Act 1721 | The Lotteries Act, 1721. | In section thirty-seven, the words from " to be recovered with costs of suit " to the end of the section, in so far as they extend to Northern Ireland. |
| 6 Geo. 2. c. 35 | Lotteries Act 1732 | The Lotteries Act, 1732. | In section twenty-nine, the words from " upon Action of Debt Bill, Plaint " to " shall be allowed) ", in so far as they extend to Northern Ireland. |
| 9 Geo. 2. c. 38 | Corrupt Practices at Elections Act 1735 | An Act to explain and amend so much of an Act made in the second Year of his present Majesty's Reign, intituled, An Act for the more effectual preventing Bribery and Corruption in the Elections of Members to serve in Parliament, as relates to the commencing and carrying on of Prosecutions grounded upon the said Act. | The whole act. |
| 12 Geo. 2. c. 28 | Gaming Act 1738 | The Gaming Act, 1738. | Sections six, seven and nine, in so far as they extend to Northern Ireland. |
| 18 Geo. 2. c. 24 | Linen (Trade Marks) Act 1744 | The Linen (Trade Marks) Act, 1744. | In the preamble, the words from " by reason of the bounty " to " And whereas ". |
| 23 Geo. 2. c. 1 | National Debt (No. 1) Act 1749 | The National Debt (No. 1) Act, 1749. | The whole act, so far as unrepealed. |
| 23 Geo. 2. c. 22 | National Debt (No. 2) Act 1749 | The National Debt (No. 2) Act, 1749. | The whole act, so far as unrepealed. |
| 26 Geo. 2. c. 34 | Cattle Distemper, Vagrancy, Marshalsea Prison, etc. Act 1753 | An Act to explain, amend and continue several Laws more effectually to prevent the spreading of the Distemper which now rages amongst the horned Cattle in this Kingdom; for the more effectual paying the Expenses of passing Vagrants; for obviating Doubts that may arise touching the keeping of Prisoners, until the Prison of the Marshalsea of the Court of King's Bench shall be rebuilt or repaired; and for amending so much of the Act of the twenty-fourth of his present Majesty for regulating the Commencement of the Year, and for correcting the Calendar now in Use, as relates to the Time of electing publick Officers of the City of Chester. | Section four. |
| 13 Geo. 3. c. 38 | Plate Glass Manufacture Act 1772 | An Act to incorporate certain Persons therein named, and their Successors, with proper Powers for the Purpose of establishing One or more Glass Manufactories within the Kingdom of Great Britain; and for the more effectually supporting and conducting the same upon an improved Plan, in a peculiar Manner, calculated for the casting of large Plate Glass. | The whole act. |
| 13 Geo. 3. c. 43 | Corn Act 1772 | An Act to regulate the Importation and Exportation of Corn. | The whole act, in so far as it extends to Northern Ireland. |
| 23 Geo. 3. c. 28 | Irish Appeals Act 1783 | The Irish Appeals Act, 1783. | In the preamble, the words from " to be bound only " to " what ever, and " and from " finally, and " to " from thence ". In section one, the words from " to be bound only " to " what ever, and " and from " finally, and " to " from thence ". |
| 36 Geo. 3. c. 60 | Metal Button Act 1796 | The Metal Button Act, 1796. | The whole act, so far as unrepealed. |
| 38 Geo. 3. c. xvii (Public, Local and Personal.) | Plate Glass Company Act 1798 | An Act to incorporate certain Persons therein named, and their Successors, with proper Powers, for the Purpose of continuing a Manufactory of Plate Glass, originally established under an Act passed in the thirteenth Year of His present Majesty's Reign, which is now expired. | The whole act. |
| 39 & 40 Geo. 3. c. 67 | Union with Ireland Act 1800 | The Union with Ireland Act, 1800. | In section one, in article four, in paragraph one, the words " four lords spiritual of Ireland, by rotation of sessions, and ", and from " and one hundred " to the end of the paragraph; in paragraph three, the words " spiritual or "; in paragraph nine, the words " spiritual and ", where occurring for the first and last time; in paragraph eleven, the words from " and that all lords spiritual " to " depending thereon " and the word " excepted) ", where next occurring thereafter; in article five, the words from " the churches of England and Ireland " to " in like manner "; and article seven. In section two, the words " four lords spiritual of Ireland by rotation of sessions, and "; from " and one hundred commoners " to " as is hereinafter provided: That "; from " And be it enacted that of the one hundred commoners " to " for the borough of Enniskillen one "; the word " said " occurring before " commoners shall become vacant " and before " counties, cities or boroughs "; the words from " and that all the other towns " to " representatives to serve in Parliament " and " other than the aforesaid " where next occurring thereafter; the words from " the primate of all Ireland " where next occurring thereafter to " Kingdom for the first session thereof "; and from " And be it enacted that in case any lord spiritual " to " as in the case of any other vacancy of a seat in the House of Commons of the Parliament of the United Kingdom "; the words " specified in this Act " and the words " according to the number herein-before set forth ". |
| 41 Geo. 3. c. 78 | Constables Expenses Act 1801 | The Constables Expenses Act, 1801. | Section two. |
| 46 Geo. 3. c. 50 | Annuity to Lord Saint Vincent Act 1806 | An Act for extending the Annuity granted to Earl of St. Vincent, to the Two next Persons to whom the Title of Viscount St. Vincent is limited. | The whole act. |
| 50 Geo. 3. c. 8 | Annuity to Duke of Wellington, etc. Act 1810 | An Act for settling and securing a certain Annuity on Viscount Wellington and the Two next Persons to whom the Title of Viscount Wellington shall descend, in consideration of his eminent Services. | The whole act. |
| 50 Geo. 3. c. 33 | School Sites (Ireland) Act 1810 | The School Sites (Ireland) Act, 1810. | Section three. |
| 52 Geo. 3. c. 37 | Annuity to Duke of Wellington Act 1812 | An Act for settling and securing a certain Annuity on Earl Wellington and the Two next Persons to whom the Title of Earl Wellington shall descend, in Consideration of his eminent Services. | The whole act. |
| 53 Geo. 3. c. 48 | Local Militia (Ireland) Act 1813 | The Local Militia (Ireland) Act, 1813. | The whole act, so far as unrepealed. |
| 54 Geo. 3. c. 159 | Harbours Act 1814 | The Harbours Act, 1814. | In section twenty-one, the words from " there to remain without bail " to the end of the section, in so far as they extend to Northern Ireland. In section twenty-three, the words from " according to the following form " to " the same county, division or place,", in so far as they extend to Northern Ireland. Section twenty-four, in so far as it extends to Northern Ireland. In section twenty-six, the words from " holden for the county " to the end of the section, in so far as they extend to Northern Ireland. In section twenty-eight, the words " or by any lord or lords, lady or ladies of any manor or manors ", so far as unrepealed. |
| 54 Geo. 3. c. 163 | Annuity to Lord Combermere, etc. Act 1814 | An Act for settling and securing an Annuity on Lord Combermere, and the Two next Persons to whom the Title of Lord Combermere shall descend, in Consideration of his eminent Services. | The whole act. |
| 55 Geo. 3. c. 157 | Evidence (Ireland) Act 1815 | The Evidence (Ireland) Act, 1815. | Section eight. |
| 56 Geo. 3. c. 52 | Glebe Exchange Act 1816 | The Glebe Exchange Act, 1816. | The whole act, so far as unrepealed, in so far as it extends to Northern Ireland. |
| 57 Geo. 3. c. 62 | Public Offices (Ireland) Act 1817 | The Public Offices (Ireland) Act, 1817. | The whole act, so far as unrepealed. |
| 58 Geo. 3. c. 24 | Annuities to Royal Family Act 1818 | An Act for enabling His Majesty to make further Provision for His Royal Highness the Duke of Cambridge, and to settle an Annuity on the Princess of Hesse, in case she shall survive His said Royal Highness. | The whole act. |
| 1 Geo. 4. c. 68 | Exchequer Chamber (Ireland) Act 1820 | The Exchequer Chamber (Ireland) Act, 1820. | The whole act, so far as unrepealed. |
| 1 & 2 Geo. 4. c. 53 | Common Law Procedure (Ireland) Act 1821 | The Common Law Procedure (Ireland) Act, 1821. | Sections twenty-four and twenty-five. Sections twenty-eight to thirty. Sections thirty-nine and forty. Section forty-eight. In section forty-nine, the words from " and that upon all such taxations " to the end of the section. Section fifty. Sections sixty-three and sixty-four. Section sixty-nine. |
| 1 & 2 Geo. 4. c. 54 | Clerk of Assize (Ireland) Act 1821 | The Clerk of Assize (Ireland) Act, 1821. | Sections four to six. |
| 1 & 2 Geo. 4. c. 112 | Stamp Duties in Law Proceedings (Ireland) Act 1821 | The Stamp Duties in Law Proceedings (Ireland) Act, 1821. | The whole act, so far as unrepealed. |
| 4 Geo. 4. c. 7 | Chancellor of the Exchequer (Ireland) Act 1823 | The Chancellor of the Exchequer (Ireland) Act, 1823. | The whole act, so far as unrepealed. |
| 4 Geo. 4. c. 61 | Court of Chancery (Ireland) Act 1823 | The Court of Chancery (Ireland) Act, 1823. | Sections five to seven. Section eighteen. In section nineteen, the words from " and upon all such taxation " to the end of the section. Section forty-one. Section fifty-six. Section seventy-two. The Schedule. |
| 4 Geo. 4. c. 92 | Annuity to Lord St. Vincent Act 1823 | An Act for extending the Annuity granted to Earl Saint Vincent to the present Viscount Saint Vincent and the next Person to whom the Title of Viscount Saint Vincent shall descend. | The whole act. |
| 10 Geo. 4. c. 7 | Roman Catholic Relief Act 1829 | The Roman Catholic Relief Act, 1829. | Sections twenty-six and twenty-eight to thirty-seven, so far as unrepealed. The Schedule, so far as unrepealed. |
| 10 Geo. 4. c. 50 | Crown Lands Act 1829 | The Crown Lands Act, 1829. | In section eight, the words " by his " and " letters patent ". In section thirty-five, the words " under their hands and seals "; the words " conveyance and " where secondly occurring, and the words " execution and ". In section forty-two, the words " shall be attested as to the execution thereof by the said Commissioners, by at least one witness, and ". In section fifty-two, the words " or any copyhold lands or hereditaments the freehold of which shall be in the crown " and the words " pensions, annuities,". Section fifty-nine. Section sixty-nine. In section one hundred and ten, the words " so much of " where first occurring, the words from " as shall have become due " to " Isle of Alderney " and the words from " in England and Wales " to the end of the section. Section one hundred and fourteen. Section one hundred and twenty-three. |
| 1 & 2 Will. 4. c. 31 | Judicature (Ireland) Act 1831 | The Judicature (Ireland) Act, 1831. | The whole act, so far as unrepealed. |
| 1 & 2 Will. 4. c. 33 | Public Works (Ireland) Act 1831 | The Public Works (Ireland) Act, 1831. | The whole act, so far as unrepealed. |
| 1 & 2 Will. 4. c. 55 | Illicit Distillation (Ireland) Act 1831 | The Illicit Distillation (Ireland) Act, 1831. | The preamble. In section forty-nine, from the beginning to the words " hereto annexed; and ". The Schedule. |
| 2 & 3 Will. 4. c. 1 | Crown Lands Act 1832 | The Crown Lands Act, 1832. | Section twenty. |
| 2 & 3 Will. 4. c. 21 | Coal Trade (Ireland) Act 1832 | The Coal Trade (Ireland) Act, 1832. | The whole act, so far as unrepealed. |
| 2 & 3 Will. 4. c. 48 | Clerk of the Crown (Ireland) Act 1832 | The Clerk of the Crown (Ireland) Act, 1832. | The whole act, so far as unrepealed, except in section one the words " There shall be one clerk of the crown of the Court of King's Bench in Ireland ", and section sixteen. |
| 2 & 3 Will. 4. c. 88 | Representation of the People (Ireland) Act 1832 | The Representation of the People (Ireland) Act, 1832. | The whole act, so far as unrepealed. |
| 3 & 4 Will. 4. c. 90 | Lighting and Watching Act 1833 | The Lighting and Watching Act, 1833. | Sections thirty-nine to forty-three. |
| 5 & 6 Will. 4. c. 16 | Chancery (Ireland) Act 1835 | The Chancery (Ireland) Act, 1835. | Rule sixteen of section twelve. Sections fourteen and fifteen. |
| 5 & 6 Will. 4. c. 38 | Prisons Act 1835 | The Prisons Act, 1835. | The whole act, so far as unrepealed. |
| 6 & 7 Will. 4. c. 71 | Tithe Act 1836 | The Tithe Act, 1836. | Section three. Section ten. Sections thirteen to sixteen. Section twenty-nine, so far as unrepealed. Sections thirty and thirty-one. Section fifty-seven, so far as unrepealed. Section sixty-two, so far as unrepealed. Section sixty-seven, so far as unrepealed. Section sixty-eight. Section ninety-three, so far as unrepealed. |
| 6 & 7 Will. 4. c. 74 | Court of Chancery (Ireland) Act 1836 | The Court of Chancery (Ireland) Act, 1836. | The whole act, so far as unrepealed, except sections two and nineteen. |
| 7 Will. 4 & 1 Vict. c. 69 | Tithe Act 1837 | The Tithe Act, 1837. | The whole act, so far as unrepealed. |
| 1 & 2 Vict. c. 64 | Tithe Act 1838 | The Tithe Act, 1838. | Section four. |
| 2 & 3 Vict. c. 62 | Tithe Act 1839 | The Tithe Act, 1839. | Section seven. Section fourteen, so far as unrepealed. Sections sixteen and seventeen, so far as unrepealed. Sections nineteen and twenty. Section twenty-one, so far as unrepealed. Section twenty-eight. |
| 3 & 4 Vict. c. 11 | Lord Seaton's Annuity Act 1840 | An Act to settle an Annuity on Lord Seaton, and the Two next surviving Heirs Male of the Body of the said Lord Seaton to whom the Title of Lord Seaton shall descend, in considertion of his important Services. | The whole act. |
| 3 & 4 Vict. c. 15 | Tithe Act 1840 | The Tithe Act, 1840. | Section seventeen, so far as unrepealed. Section twenty, so far as unrepealed. Section twenty-three, so far as unrepealed. Section twenty-four. |
| 4 & 5 Vict. c. 1 | Annuity to Lord Keane, etc. Act 1841 | An Act to settle an Annuity on Lord Keane, and the Two next surviving Heirs Male of the Body of the said Lord Keane to whom the Title of Lord Keane shall descend, in consideration of his great and brilliant Services. | The whole act. |
| 5 Vict. c. 1 | Crown Lands Act 1841 | The Crown Lands Act, 1841. | Sections five to seven. |
| 5 & 6 Vict. c. 48 | Forest of Dean (Poor Relief) Act 1842 | An Act to provide for the Relief of the Poor in the Forest of Dean and other Extra-parochial Places in and near the Hundred of Saint Briavel's in the County of Gloucester. | The whole act. |
| 5 & 6 Vict. c. 54 | Tithe Act 1842 | The Tithe Act, 1842. | Section three, so far as unrepealed. Sections six to eight, so far as unrepealed. |
| 5 & 6 Vict. c. 98 | Prisons Act 1842 | The Prisons Act, 1842. | The whole act, so far as unrepealed. |
| 6 & 7 Vict. c. 25 | Duchess of Mecklenburgh Strelitz's Annuity Act 1843 | An Act to enable Her Majesty to settle an Annuity on Her Royal Highness the Princess Augusta Caroline, eldest Daughter of His Royal Highness the Duke of Cambridge. | The whole act. |
| 6 & 7 Vict. c. 54 | Limitation of Actions Act 1843 | The Limitation of Actions Act, 1843. | The whole act, so far as unrepealed. |
| 7 & 8 Vict. c. 33 | County Rates Act 1844 | The County Rates Act, 1844. | Section five. Section eight. |
| 7 & 8 Vict. c. 52 | Parish Constables Act 1844 | The Parish Constables Act, 1844. | The whole act, so far as unrepealed. |
| 7 & 8 Vict. c. 71 | Middlesex Sessions Act 1844 | The Middlesex Sessions Act, 1844. | The whole act, so far as unrepealed. |
| 7 & 8 Vict. c. 107 | Common Law Offices (Ireland) Act 1844 | The Common Law Offices (Ireland) Act, 1844. | Section three. Sections six and seven. Section eleven. Sections nineteen to twenty-two. Sections twenty-four to twenty-eight. |
| 8 & 9 Vict. c. 72 | Rothwell Gaol Act 1845 | An Act to render it unnecessary to keep up Rothwell Gaol, in the Honor of Pontefract, in the West Riding of the County of York. | The whole act, except section four. |
| 8 & 9 Vict. c. 114 | Gaol Fees Abolition Act 1845 | The Gaol Fees Abolition Act, 1845. | The whole act, so far as unrepealed. |
| 8 & 9 Vict. c. 115 | Chancery Taxing Master (Ireland) Act 1845 | The Chancery Taxing Master (Ireland) Act, 1845. | Section fifteen. |
| 9 & 10 Vict. c. 31 | Annuity Lord Hardinge Act 1846 | An Act to settle an Annuity on Viscount Hardinge, and the Two next surviving Heirs Male of the Body of the said Viscount Hardinge to whom the Title of Viscount Hardinge shall descend, in consideration of his great and brilliant Services. | The whole act. |
| 9 & 10 Vict. c. 32 | Annuity, Lord Gough Act 1846 | An Act to settle an Annuity on Lord Gough and the Two next surviving Heirs Male of the Body of the said Lord Gough to whom the Title of Lord Gough shall descend, in consideration of his important Services. | The whole act. |
| 9 & 10 Vict. c. 73 | Tithe Act 1846 | The Tithe Act, 1846. | Sections three and four. In section five, the proviso. Section fifteen. |
| 10 & 11 Vict. c. 104 | Tithe Act 1847 | The Tithe Act, 1847. | Section four. |
| 13 & 14 Vict. c. 77 | Annuities to Duke and Princess Mary of Cambridge Act 1850 | An Act to enable Her Majesty to make a suitable Provision for His Royal Highness the Duke of Cambridge, and also for Her Royal Highness the Princess Mary Cambridge. | The whole act. |
| 14 & 15 Vict. c. 42 | Crown Lands Act 1851 | The Crown Lands Act, 1851. | In section three, the words " and for the purpose of such Acts the Commissioners of Woods shall be a corporation in the place of the said Commissioners of Her Majesty's Woods, Forests, Land Revenues, Works and Buildings ". Section five. |
| 14 & 15 Vict. c. 46 | Crown Lands (Copyholds) Act 1851 | The Crown Lands (Copyholds) Act, 1851. | Section three. |
| 15 & 16 Vict. c. 62 | Crown Lands Act 1852 | The Crown Lands Act, 1852. | In the preamble, the words from the beginning to " doubts be removed: And ". Section one. In section three, the words from " ; and the powers relating to the apportionment " to the end of the section. |
| 16 & 17 Vict. c. 56 | Crown Lands Act 1853 | The Crown Lands Act, 1853. | In the preamble, the words from the beginning to " yearly sums of money ". Sections one to four. |
| 16 & 17 Vict. c. 73 | Naval Volunteers Act 1853 | The Naval Volunteers Act, 1853. | Sections thirteen to fifteen. In section sixteen, the words " and shall form the crews or parts of the crews of such ships or vessels ", and from " be entitled to the same pay " to " service, and shall also ". In section seventeen, the words from the beginning to " ratings in Her Majesty's Navy " and " of the Coast Guard, of Her Majesty's revenue cruizers, seamen-riggers, and others ". In section twenty-one, the words from " officer or man " to " seaman-rigger, or other ". In section twenty-two, the words from " officer or man ", where they occur for the first time, to " seaman-rigger, or other ", the words " such officer or man, seaman-rigger, or ", the word " other " where it occurs next after the last mentioned words, and the words " officer or man, seaman-rigger, or other ". In section twenty-three, the words " and any forfeiture of treble value ", and " and forfeiture of treble value ". In section twenty-four, the words " not including the treble value of any articles", " together with the treble value of any articles ", and " and such treble value ". |
| 16 & 17 Vict. c. 98 | Court of Chancery (England) Act 1853 | An Act for the further Relief of the Suitors of the High Court of Chancery. | The whole act, so far as unrepealed. |
| 16 & 17 Vict. c. 113 | Common Law Procedure (Ireland) Act 1853 | The Common Law Procedure (Ireland) Act, 1853. | Section one hundred and twenty-six. In section one hundred and thirty-two, the words from " in the form " to " this Act annexed,". In section one hundred and forty-seven, the words from " in the Form " to " to the like effect ". Section one hundred and fifty-three. Section one hundred and eighty-nine. In section two hundred and twenty-nine, the words from " in the form " to " this Act annexed,". Section two hundred and thirty-two, so far as unrepealed. Section two hundred and forty-one. Section two hundred and forty-three, so far as unrepealed. Schedule B, so far as unrepealed. |
| 17 & 18 Vict. c. 94 | Public Revenue and Consolidated Fund Charges Act 1854 | The Public Revenue and Consolidated Fund Charges Act, 1854. | In Schedule (B.), in the first, second and third columns, the entries " Contribution towards defraying the charge of maintaining the police of the Metropolis, and salaries of the Commissioners of Police ", and " 2 & 3 Vict. c. 47 ". |
| 18 & 19 Vict. c. 64 | Annuity (Lord and Lady Raglan) Act 1855 | An Act to settle Annuities on Emily Harriet Lady Raglan and Richard Henry Fitzroy Lord Raglan, and the next surviving Heir Male of his Body, in consideration of the eminent Services of the late Field Marshal Lord Raglan. | The whole act. |
| 19 & 20 Vict. c. 92 | Chancery Appeal Court (Ireland) Act 1856 | The Chancery Appeal Court (Ireland) Act, 1856. | In section two, the words " "Chancery" and "Court" shall mean the Court of Chancery in Ireland, and " and " " suit " shall include cause, cause petition, and petition matter ". |
| 19 & 20 Vict. c. 102 | Common Law Procedure Amendment Act (Ireland) 1856 | The Common Law Procedure Amendment Act, (Ireland), 1856. | Sections six to twenty, so far as unrepealed. Section twenty-one. Section thirty-six. Section eighty-nine. Section ninety-three. Section ninety-five. Section ninety-seven. In section ninety-eight, the figure " 14 " and the words from " and the enactments" to the end of the section. |
| 19 & 20 Vict. c. 118 | Criminal Justice Act 1856 | The Criminal Justice Act, 1856. | The whole act. |
| 19 & 20 Vict. c. 119 | Marriage and Registration Act 1856 | The Marriage and Registration Act, 1856. | The whole act, in so far as it extends to Northern Ireland. |
| 20 & 21 Vict. c. 2 | Annuity, Princess Royal Act 1857 | An Act to enable Her Majesty to settle an Annuity on Her Royal Highness the Princess Royal. | The whole act. |
| 21 & 22 Vict. c. 2 | Annuity (Lady of Havelock) Act 1858 | An Act to settle Annuities on Lady Havelock and Sir Henry Marshman Havelock, in consideration of the eminent Services of the late Major General Havelock. | The whole act. |
| 21 & 22 Vict. c. 72 | Landed Estates Court (Ireland) Act 1858 | The Landed Estates Court (Ireland) Act, 1858. | In section one, the definition of " Lord Chancellor ". Section two. Section eight. Sections fourteen to sixteen. Sections twenty-five to twenty-seven. Section twenty-nine. |
| 22 & 23 Vict. c. 40 | Royal Naval Reserve (Volunteer) Act 1859 | The Royal Naval Reserve (Volunteer) Act, 1859. | In section three, the words from " and may form " to " cause them to join ". In section five, the words from " and, where he " to " cause them to join ". In section six, the words from " and for such time " to " qualified to fill ". In section seven, the words from " and upon his entering " to " belonging to that force,". In section fifteen, the words from " and applicable to " to " Her Majesty's ships or vessels ". In section eighteen, the words " or in the Militia or in the Royal Naval Coast Volunteers " where first occurring; the words from " and in case any person " to " be null and void; "; from " or who shall be enlisted " to " volunteer under this Act,"; from " or in the Militia ", where last occurring, to " under this Act," where next occurring; the first proviso; in the second proviso, the words " and " where first occurring, " also " and from " or who shall be enlisted " to " Coast Volunteers ". |
| 23 & 24 Vict. c. 82 | Common Law Procedure (Ireland) Act 1860 | The Common Law Procedure (Ireland) Act, 1860. | The whole act. |
| 23 & 24 Vict. c. 93 | Tithe Act 1860 | The Tithe Act, 1860. | Sections one and two, so far as unrepealed. Sections four to nine, so far as unrepealed. Section twenty-eight. Section thirty-three. In section forty-one, the words from " and shall not " to " render of heriots " and from " and the glebe land " to the end of the section. Sections forty-two and forty-three, so far as unrepealed. The Schedule, so far as unrepealed. |
| 24 & 25 Vict. c. 10 | Admiralty Court Act 1861 | The Admiralty Court Act, 1861. | The whole act, in so far as it extends to Northern Ireland. |
| 24 & 25 Vict. c. 15 | Annuity to Princess Alice Act 1861 | An Act to enable Her Majesty to settle an Annuity on Her Royal Highness the Princess Alice Maud Mary. | The whole act. |
| 24 & 25 Vict. c. 51 | Metropolitan Police Act 1861 | The Metropolitan Police Act, 1861. | Sections one and two. |
| 24 & 25 Vict. c. 100 | Offences against the Person Act 1861 | The Offences against the Person Act, 1861. | In section seventy-two, the words from " and no warrant " to the end of the section, except in so far as they extend to Northern Ireland. |
| 24 & 25 Vict. c. 123 | Landed Estates Court (Ireland) Act 1861 | The Landed Estates Court (Ireland) Act, 1861. | The whole act, so far as unrepealed. |
| 25 & 26 Vict. c. 104 | Queen's Prison Discontinuance Act 1862 | The Queen's Prison Discontinuance Act, 1862. | The whole act, so far as unrepealed. |
| 26 & 27 Vict. c. 14 | Post Office Savings Bank Act 1863 | The Post Office Savings Bank Act, 1863. | Section six. |
| 26 & 27 Vict. c. 69 | Officers of Royal Naval Reserve Act 1863 | The Officers of Royal Naval Reserve Act, 1863. | In section one, the words from " or of any persons " to " East India Company ". |
| 27 & 28 Vict. c. 31 | Annuity to Lady Elgin Act 1864 | An Act to settle an Annuity on Mary Louisa Countess of Elgin and Kincardine, in consideration of the distinguished Services performed by the late James Earl of Elgin and Kincardine. | The whole act. |
| 27 & 28 Vict. c. 57 | Admiralty Lands and Works Act 1864 | The Admiralty Lands and Works Act, 1864. | Section thirteen. |
| 27 & 28 Vict. c. 120 | Railway Companies' Powers Act 1864 | The Railway Companies' Powers Act, 1864. | Section two, so far as unrepealed. Subsections (2) and (3) of section four. Sections five and six. Sections nine to fifteen. In section twenty, the words " In the thirdly-mentioned case, the Companies Clauses Acts ". Sections twenty-two to twenty-four. Sections twenty-six and twenty-seven. Section thirty-five. The Schedule, so far as unrepealed. |
| 27 & 28 Vict. c. 121 | Railways Construction Facilities Act 1864 | The Railways Construction Facilities Act, 1864. | In section two, the words from " the term " the Companies Clauses Acts " " to " Companies Clauses Act, 1863 ". Subsections (2) and (3) of section six. Sections seven and eight. Sections eleven to seventeen. Section twenty-two. Sections twenty-four to thirty. Section thirty-two. Sections thirty-four to forty-eight. Section fifty-two. Sections fifty-six and fifty-seven. Section sixty-four. Parts (ii) and (v) of the Schedule. |
| 29 & 30 Vict. c. 7 | Annuity, Princess Helena Act 1866 | An Act to enable Her Majesty to settle an Annuity on Her Royal Highness the Princess Helena Augusta Victoria. | The whole act. |
| 29 & 30 Vict. c. 8 | Annuity, Duke of Edinburgh Act 1866 | An Act to enable Her Majesty to provide for the Support and Maintenance of His Royal Highness Prince Alfred Ernest Albert on his coming of Age. | The whole act. |
| 29 & 30 Vict. c. 48 | Annuity, Princess Mary of Cambridge Act 1866 | An Act to enable Her Majesty to settle an Annuity on Her Royal Highness the Princess Mary Adelaide Wilhelmina Elizabeth of Cambridge. | The whole act. |
| 29 & 30 Vict. c. 66 | New Forest Poor Act | An Act to provide for the Relief of the Poor in the New Forest. | The whole act. |
| 29 & 30 Vict. c. 68 | Superannuation Act 1866 | The Superannuation Act, 1866. | The whole act, so far as unrepealed. |
| 30 & 31 Vict. c. 44 | Chancery (Ireland) Act 1867 | The Chancery (Ireland) Act, 1867. | In section two, the definition of " swear ". In section eleven, the words " and the Vice-Chancellor", the word " respectively ", where each time occurring, and the word " each " where each time occurring. In section twelve, the words " or to the Vice-Chancellor ". Section thirteen, so far as unrepealed. In section fifteen, the words " an Attorney or ". Section sixteen. Section seventeen, so far as unrepealed. Sections eighteen and nineteen. Sections twenty-four and twenty-five, both so far as unrepealed. Section forty-one, so far as unrepealed. Section one hundred and nine. In section one hundred and ninety-one, the words " the Vice-Chancellor ". |
| 30 & 31 Vict. c. 70 | Public Records (Ireland) Act 1867 | The Public Records (Ireland) Act, 1867. | The whole act, so far as unrepealed. |
| 30 & 31 Vict. c. 114 | Court of Admiralty (Ireland) Act 1867 | The Court of Admiralty (Ireland) Act, 1867. | Section seventy-three. |
| 30 & 31 Vict. c. 129 | Chancery and Common Law Offices (Ireland) Act 1867 | The Chancery and Common Law Offices (Ireland) Act, 1867. | Section four, so far as unrepealed. Section seven, so far as unrepealed. Section ten, so far as unrepealed. Sections fourteen to twenty. Sections twenty-one and twenty-two, both so far as unrepealed. Section twenty-three. Section twenty-five, so far as unrepealed. In section twenty-seven, the words from " the Vice Chancellor " to " one hundred pounds, and for ". Section twenty-eight, so far as unrepealed. Section thirty-two. Section thirty-three, so far as unrepealed. Sections forty-four and forty-five, both so far as unrepealed. Section forty-eight. Section forty-nine, so far as unrepealed. Sections fifty-three and fifty-four. Sections fifty-five to fifty-seven, so far as unrepealed. |
| 31 & 32 Vict. c. 68 | Liquidation Act 1868 | The Liquidation Act, 1868. | The whole act. |
| 31 & 32 Vict. c. 72 | Promissory Oaths Act 1868 | The Promissory Oaths Act, 1868. | In section fourteen, paragraph eight. In the Schedule, so much of the first part as relates to the Lord Chancellor of Ireland, and the Chief Secretary for Ireland and, except in so far as concerns Justices of the Peace for counties and boroughs, so much of the second part as relates to Ireland. |
| 31 & 32 Vict. c. 91 | Annuity (Lord Napier) Act 1868 | An Act to settle an Annuity upon Lieutenant General Sir Robert Napier, G.C.B., G.C.S.I., and the next surviving Heir Male of his Body, in consideration of his eminent Services. | The whole act. |
| 31 & 32 Vict. c. 110 | Telegraph Act 1868 | The Telegraph Act, 1868. | Subsection (7) of section eight. |
| 32 & 33 Vict. c. 47 | High Constables Act 1869 | The High Constables Act, 1869. | In section two, the words from " but this provision " to the end of the section. In section three, the words from " (except " to " electors) " and from " and no precept or notice " to the end of the section. Sections four and five. |
| 32 & 33 Vict. c. 73 | Telegraph Act 1869 | The Telegraph Act, 1869. | Sections thirteen to eighteen. |
| 32 & 33 Vict. c. 74 | Public Works (Ireland) Act 1869 | The Public Works (Ireland) Act, 1869. | Section two. |
| 33 & 34 Vict. c. 10 | Coinage Act 1870 | The Coinage Act, 1870. | In section twenty, the words from " The Acts mentioned " to " Provided that ", and the Second Schedule, in so far as those provisions extend to Northern Ireland. |
| 33 & 34 Vict. c. 19 | Railways (Powers and Construction) Acts, 1864, Amendment Act 1870 | The Railways (Powers and Construction) Acts, 1864, Amendment Act, 1870. | The whole act, so far as unrepealed. |
| 33 & 34 Vict. c. 90 | Foreign Enlistment Act 1870 | The Foreign Enlistment Act, 1870. | In section twenty-six, the words " or the chief secretary ". |
| 34 & 35 Vict. c. 1 | Annuity to Princess Louise Act 1871 | An Act to enable Her Majesty to settle an Annuity on Her Royal Highness the Princess Louise Caroline Alberta. | The whole act. |
| 34 & 35 Vict. c. 64 | Annuity to Duke of Connaught Act 1871 | An Act to enable Her Majesty to provide for the Support and Maintenance of His Royal Highness Prince Arthur William Patrick Albert on his coming of age. | The whole act. |
| 34 & 35 Vict. c. 72 | Judgments Registry (Ireland) Act 1871 | The Judgments Registry (Ireland) Act, 1871. | Section nine. Sections fourteen to nineteen. Section twenty-four. |
| 34 & 35 Vict. c. 75 | Telegraph (Money) Act 1871 | The Telegraph (Money) Act, 1871. | The whole act. |
| 35 & 36 Vict. c. 56 | Annuity (Lady Mayo) Act 1872 | An Act to settle an annuity on the Honourable Blanche Julia Countess of Mayo, in consideration of the eminent services of the late Earl of Mayo as Viceroy and Governor General of India. | The whole act. |
| 35 & 36 Vict. c. 67 | Greenwich Hospital Act 1872 | The Greenwich Hospital Act, 1872. | Sections two and three. |
| 35 & 36 Vict. c. 94 | Licensing Act 1872 | The Licensing Act, 1872. | In section twelve, the words " with or without hard labour " and from " where the court " to the end of the section. |
| 36 & 37 Vict. c. 77 | Naval Artillery Volunteer Act 1873 | The Naval Artillery Volunteer Act, 1873. | The whole act, so far as unrepealed. |
| 36 & 37 Vict. c. 80 | Annuity to Duke and Duchess of Edinburgh Act 1873 | An Act to enable Her Majesty to provide for the Establishment of His Royal Highness the Duke of Edinburgh and Her Imperial Highness the Grand Duchess Marie Alexandrovna of Russia, and to settle an annuity on Her Imperial Highness. | The whole act. |
| 36 & 37 Vict. c. 83 | Telegraph Act 1873 | The Telegraph Act, 1873. | The whole act. |
| 38 & 39 Vict. c. 63 | Sale of Food and Drugs Act 1875 | The Sale of Food and Drugs Act, 1875. | The whole act, so far as unrepealed, except in so far as it extends to Northern Ireland. |
| 39 & 40 Vict. c. 56 | Commons Act 1876 | The Commons Act, 1876. | Section thirty-four. |
| 40 & 41 Vict. c. 57 | Supreme Court of Judicature (Ireland) Act 1877 | The Supreme Court of Judicature (Ireland) Act, 1877. | Section five. In section six, the words from " The Lord Chancellor shall " to " manner as heretofore "; the words " the Master of the Rolls " " and the Lord Chief Baron ", each where occurring for the second time; the words " other than the Lord Chancellor and the Judges last-mentioned ", and the words from " The Lord Chancellor for the time being " to the end of the section. In section ten, the words from the beginning of the section to " Lord Chief Baron of the Exchequer "; the words " ex-officio Judges and "; " Lord Chancellor or of "; " Master of the Rolls,"; " or Chief Baron of the Exchequer "; and the words from " The Lord Chancellor for the time being " to the end of the section. In section thirteen, the words " other than the Lord Chancellor,"; " (other than the Lord Chancellor) " and the words from " The oaths to be taken " to " the same as heretofore ". In section eighteen, the words " and to "; " the Lord Chief Baron of the Exchequer "; the words from " four thousand six hundred " to " appointed under the said Act "; and the words from " Provided always," to " before the passing of this Act ". In section nineteen, the words " other than the Lord Chancellor,". In section thirty-four, the words from " consisting of such Judges respectively " to the end of the section. In section forty-one, the words " serjeants-at-law, or " and the words from " nor for more than one Judge " to the end of the section. In section forty-two, the words " or the Chancery Regulation (Ireland) Act, 1862,". In section forty-three, the words " and Exchequer "; the letter " s " at the end of the word " Divisions ". In section forty-six, the words " and in the meantime until such Rules shall be made,"; the words " and Exchequer "; the letter " s " at the end of the word " Divisions "; the word " respectively "; and the words " either the Lord Chancellor or ". In section forty-seven, the words " and in the meantime until such rules shall be made,". In section fifty-one, the words from " in which case an appeal " to the end of the section. In section sixty, the words from the beginning of the section to the words " Judges of the same respectively " where occurring for the second time. In section sixty-one, the words from " if made before the commencement " to " after the commencement of this Act," where occurring for the second time. In section seventy, the words " the Lord Chancellor, with the concurrence of ". Section seventy-two. In section seventy-three, the words from " the Chief Justice " to " Lord Chancellor shall be one ". In section seventy-five, the words from " The officers connected with the office " to " the officers of the Receiver Master." and from " The duties imposed upon the Land Judges " to the end of the section. Section eighty. In section eighty-one, the words from " or the position salaries " to the end of the section. In section eighty-two, the words from the beginning of the section to " if this Act had not passed; and "; and from " but so that no existing " to the end of the section. Section eighty-three. In section eighty-four, the words from " with the advice and consent " to " or any one of them, and ". |
| 41 & 42 Vict. c. 51 | Roads and Bridges (Scotland) Act 1878 | The Roads and Bridges (Scotland) Act, 1878. | In section three, the definition of " Causeway-mail ". In section fifty-eight, the words from " Provided always, that no " to " other part of the county " where secondly occurring. |
| 42 & 43 Vict. c. 42 | Valuation of Lands (Scotland) Act 1879 | The Valuation of Lands (Scotland) Act, 1879. | Section ten. |
| 44 & 45 Vict. c. 23 | Court of Bankruptcy (Ireland) Officers and Clerks Act 1881 | The Court of Bankruptcy (Ireland) Officers and Clerks Act, 1881. | The whole act. |
| 44 & 45 Vict. c. 71 | Irish Church Act Amendment Act 1881 | The Irish Church Act Amendment Act, 1881. | Section three, so far as unrepealed. |
| 45 & 46 Vict. c. 5 | Duke of Albany (Establishment) Act 1882 | An Act to enable Her Majesty to provide for the Establishment of His Royal Highness the Duke of Albany and Her Serene Highness Princess Helen Frederica Augusta of Waldeck and Pyrmont, and to settle an Annuity on Her Serene Highness. | The whole act. |
| 45 & 46 Vict. c. 41 | Customs and Inland Revenue Act 1882 | The Customs and Inland Revenue Act, 1882. | The whole act, so far as unrepealed. |
| 45 & 46 Vict. c. 47 | Arrears of Rent (Ireland) Act 1882 | The Arrears of Rent (Ireland) Act, 1882. | The whole act, so far as unrepealed. |
| 45 & 46 Vict. c. 60 | Labourers Cottages and Allotments (Ireland) Act 1882 | The Labourers Cottages and Allotments (Ireland) Act, 1882. | The whole act. |
| 45 & 46 Vict. c. 70 | Supreme Court of Judicature (Ireland) Act 1882 | The Supreme Court of Judicature (Ireland) Act, 1882. | In section three, the words from " the Chief Justice " to " the Lord Chancellor shall be one,", the words " that no existing officer shall receive a less salary than heretofore, and " and the words from " and provided also " to the end of the section. |
| 46 & 47 Vict. c. 10 | Customs and Inland Revenue Act 1883 | The Customs and Inland Revenue Act, 1883. | In section six, the words from " Provided, that " to the end of the section. |
| 47 & 48 Vict. c. 76 | Post Office (Protection) Act 1884 | The Post Office (Protection) Act, 1884. | Section seventeen. |
| 48 & 49 Vict. c. 51 | Customs and Inland Revenue Act 1885 | The Customs and Inland Revenue Act, 1885. | The whole act, so far as unrepealed, in so far as it extends to Northern Ireland. |
| 48 & 49 Vict. c. 79 | Crown Lands Act 1885 | The Crown Lands Act, 1885. | Sections four and five. |
| 49 & 50 Vict. c. 18 | Customs and Inland Revenue Act 1886 | The Customs and Inland Revenue Act, 1886. | The whole act, so far as unrepealed. |
| 51 & 52 Vict. c. 8 | Customs and Inland Revenue Act 1888 | The Customs and Inland Revenue Act, 1888. | The whole act, so far as unrepealed, except in so far as it extends to Northern Ireland. |
| 52 & 53 Vict. c. 42 | Revenue Act 1889 | The Revenue Act, 1889. | Section thirty-four. |
| 53 & 54 Vict. c. 4 | Army (Annual) Act 1890 | The Army (Annual) Act, 1890. | Section seven. Section nine. |
| 53 & 54 Vict. c. 32 | Anglo-German Agreement Act 1890 | The Anglo-German Agreement Act, 1890. | The whole act. |
| 53 & 54 Vict. c. 42 | Reserve Forces Act 1890 | The Reserve Forces Act, 1890. | In section four, from the beginning of the section to " 1882 and 1890 and ". |
| 54 & 55 Vict. c. 8 | Tithe Act 1891 | The Tithe Act, 1891. | Section one. Section six. Section eight. In section ten, subsection (1), so far as unrepealed, and subsections (2) and (3). |
| 55 & 56 Vict. c. 2 | Army (Annual) Act 1892 | The Army (Annual) Act, 1892. | Section four. Section six. |
| 55 & 56 Vict. c. 45 | Land Commissioners (Ireland) Salaries Act 1892 | The Land Commissioners (Ireland) Salaries Act, 1892. | The whole act, so far as unrepealed. |
| 55 & 56 Vict. c. 59 | Telegraph Act 1892 | The Telegraph Act, 1892. | In section eleven, the words " A reference to the county council shall be construed to refer to the grand jury.". |
| 55 & 56 Vict. c. 61 | Public Works Loans Act 1892 | The Public Works Loans Act, 1892. | Section eight. |
| 57 & 58 Vict. c. 60 | Merchant Shipping Act 1894 | The Merchant Shipping Act, 1894. | Subsection (3) of section seven hundred and forty-six. |
| 58 & 59 Vict. c. 7 | Army (Annual) Act 1895 | The Army (Annual) Act, 1895. | Section four. Section seven. |
| 59 Vict. Sess. 2. c. 5 | Public Offices (Acquisition of Site) Act 1895 | The Public Offices (Acquisition of Site) Act, 1895. | The whole act. |
| 59 & 60 Vict. c. 28 | Finance Act 1896 | The Finance Act, 1896. | In section thirty-nine, the words from " Part Five of this Act " to " Income Tax Act, 1853 ". |
| 60 & 61 Vict. c. 66 | Supreme Court of Judicature (Ireland) (No. 2) Act 1897 | The Supreme Court of Judicature (Ireland) (No. 2) Act, 1897. | In section one, in subsection (1), the words from " and the Lord Chief Baron " to the end of the subsection, and subsection (2). In section four, in subsection (1), the words from " The Honourable Walter Boyd " to the end of the subsection; in subsection (3), the words " with the advice and consent of the Lord Chief Justice and Lord Chief Baron, or either of them, and "; in subsection (4), from " the Lord Chief Justice " to the end of the subsection; and in subsection (5), the words from the beginning, to " and if not filled ". Subsection (2) of section five. Subsection (1) of section eight. In section nine, the proviso; In section ten, the words " and of the Lord Chief Baron during his continuance in office,"; and the words from " subject to the provisions " to the end of the section. |
| 3 Edw. 7. c. 27 | South African Loan and War Contribution Act 1903 | The South African Loan and War Contribution Act, 1903. | The whole act, so far as unrepealed. |
| 3 Edw. 7. c. 37 | Irish Land Act 1903 | The Irish Land Act, 1903. | Subsection (2) of section sixty-eight. In section eighty-eight, in subsection (2), the words " appeals under section forty-seven of the Act of 1881 or " and from " and all " to " Act of 1881 ". |
| 4 Edw. 7. c. 5 | Army (Annual) Act 1904 | The Army (Annual) Act, 1904. | Section eleven. |
| 4 Edw. 7. c. 6 | Hall-marking of Foreign Plate Act 1904 | The Hall-marking of Foreign Plate Act, 1904. | In section one, in subsection (2), the words " after a date fixed by His Majesty by Order in Council ", and, in subsection (3), the words " , after the date fixed as aforesaid,". |
| 4 Edw. 7. c. 33 | Anglo-French Convention Act 1904 | The Anglo-French Convention Act, 1904. | Subsection (2) of section one. In the Schedule, so much as recites provisions of the convention there set out which are spent, that is to say, in the seventh article, the words from " Persons born in " to " have been born " and from " In the Iles de Los " to " in force there ", and the ninth article. |
| 4 Edw. 7. c. 34 | Irish Land Act 1904 | The Irish Land Act, 1904. | The whole act, so far as unrepealed. |
| 6 Edw. 7. c. 2 | Army (Annual) Act 1906 | The Army (Annual) Act, 1906. | In section four, paragraph (i) of subsection (1), and subsection (5). Section six. |
| 7 Edw. 7. c. 2 | Army (Annual) Act 1907 | The Army (Annual) Act, 1907. | Section four. In section ten, paragraph (a) of subsection (6). |
| 8 Edw. 7. c. 16 | Finance Act 1908 | The Finance Act, 1908. | In section ten, in subsection (1), the words from " so far " where they first occur to " that Act, and ". |
| 8 Edw. 7. c. 42 | White Phosphorus Matches Prohibition Act 1908 | The White Phosphorus Matches Prohibition Act, 1908. | The whole act, so far as unrepealed. |
| 9 Edw. 7. c. 24 | Merchandise Marks (Ireland) Act 1909 | The Merchandise Marks (Ireland) Act, 1909. | The whole act. |
| 10 Edw. 7 & 1 Geo. 5. c. 8 | Finance (1909-10) Act 1910 | The Finance (1909-10) Act, 1910. | Section forty-seven. |
| 1 & 2 Geo. 5. c. 26 | Telephone Transfer Act 1911 | Telephone Transfer Act, 1911. | In section nine, the words from " The expression " where first occurring, to " which is not discharged ". |
| 1 & 2 Geo. 5. c. 48 | Finance Act 1911 | The Finance Act, 1911. | Section sixteen, so far as unrepealed, in so far as it extends to Northern Ireland. |
| 2 & 3 Geo. 5. c. 5 | Army (Annual) Act 1912 | The Army (Annual) Act, 1912. | Section four. |
| 2 & 3 Geo. 5. c. 28 | Sheriff Courts (Scotland) Act 1913 | The Sheriff Courts (Scotland) Act, 1913. | So much of the Second Schedule as relates to Rules forty-five, forty-six and fifty-two of the rules in the First Schedule to the Sheriff Courts (Scotland) Act, 1907. |
| 3 & 4 Geo. 5. c. 24 | Telegraph (Money) Act 1913 | The Telegraph (Money) Act, 1913. | The whole act. |
| 5 & 6 Geo. 5. c. 42 | Defence of the Realm (Amendment) (No. 3) Act 1915 | The Defence of the Realm (Amendment) (No. 3) Act, 1915. | The whole act, in so far as it extends to Northern Ireland. |
| 5 & 6 Geo. 5. c. 81 | American Loan Act 1915 | The American Loan Act, 1915. | The whole act. |
| 6 & 7 Geo. 5. c. 11 | Finance (New Duties) Act 1916 | The Finance (New Duties) Act, 1916. | The whole act, so far as unrepealed, in so far as it extends to Northern Ireland. |
| 6 & 7 Geo. 5. c. 38 | Small Holding Colonies Act 1916 | The Small Holding Colonies Act, 1916. | The whole act, in so far as it extends to Northern Ireland. |
| 6 & 7 Geo. 5. c. 63 | Defence of the Realm (Acquisition of Land) Act 1916 | The Defence of the Realm (Acquisition of Land) Act, 1916. | In section twelve, in subsection (3), the words from " the expression ' common ' " to the end of the subsection. |
| 7 & 8 Geo. 5. c. 37 | Naval and Military War Pensions, etc. (Transfer of Powers) Act 1917 | The Naval and Military War Pensions, etc. (Transfer of Powers) Act, 1917. | In section one, the words from " As from such " to " appointed day)," and from " , or as are " to " repealed by this Act,". In section two, in subsection (3), the words " As from the appointed date ". Subsections (1) and (2) of section three. |
| 7 & 8 Geo. 5. c. 51 | Air Force (Constitution) Act 1917 | The Air Force (Constitution) Act, 1917. | In section six, in subsection (1), the words " in each case ". In the First Schedule, so much of Part II as relates to paragraph (d) of subsection (1) of section six of the Army Act. |
| 7 & 8 Geo. 5. | N/A | The Air Force Act. | In section one hundred and eighty-three, in the proviso, paragraphs (a) and (b). |
| 8 & 9 Geo. 5. c. 30 | Naval Prize Act 1918 | The Naval Prize Act, 1918. | The whole act, so far as unrepealed. |
| 8 & 9 Geo. 5. c. 54 | Tithe Act 1918 | The Tithe Act, 1918. | Section ten, so far as unrepealed. The First Schedule, so far as unrepealed. |
| 8 & 9 Geo. 5. c. 57 | War Pensions (Administrative Provisions) Act 1918 | The War Pensions (Administrative Provisions) Act, 1918. | Section ten. Section fourteen. Section seventeen. |
| 9 & 10 Geo. 5. c. 32 | Finance Act 1919 | The Finance Act, 1919. | In section thirty-eight, in subsection (1), the words from " Part II " to " Income Tax Acts ". |
| 9 & 10 Geo. 5. c. 53 | War Pensions (Administrative Provisions) Act 1919 | The War Pensions (Administrative Provisions) Act, 1919. | Section two. |
| 9 & 10 Geo. 5. c. 82 | Irish Land (Provision for Sailors and Soldiers) Act 1919 | The Irish Land (Provision for Sailors and Soldiers) Act, 1919. | Section five. |
| 10 & 11 Geo. 5. c. 4 | Coal Mines (Emergency) Act 1920 | The Coal Mines (Emergency) Act, 1920. | The whole act, so far as unrepealed. |
| 10 & 11 Geo. 5. c. 18 | Finance Act 1920 | The Finance Act, 1920. | In section sixty-four, in subsection (1), the words from " Part II " to " Income Tax Acts ". |
| 10 & 11 Geo. 5. c. 23 | War Pensions Act 1920 | The War Pensions Act, 1920. | Subsection (4) of section one. In section eleven, in subsection (2), the words from " The expression ' the Act of 1915 ' " to " &c. Act, 1915 ". |
| 10 & 11 Geo. 5. c. 31 | Restoration of Order in Ireland Act 1920 | The Restoration of Order in Ireland Act, 1920. | The whole act. |
| 10 & 11 Geo. 5. c. 37 | Telegraph (Money) Act 1920 | The Telegraph (Money) Act, 1920. | The whole act, so far as unrepealed. |
| 10 & 11 Geo. 5. c. 48 | Indemnity Act 1920 | The Indemnity Act, 1920. | The whole act, so far as unrepealed. |
| 10 & 11 Geo. 5. c. 50 | Mining Industry Act 1920 | The Mining Industry Act, 1920. | In section two, in subsection (1), the words from the beginning to " aforesaid, and " and from " as from such date " to " may determine ", and subsections (4) to (7). Subsections (3) and (4) of section five. The First Schedule. |
| 10 & 11 Geo. 5. c. 67 | Government of Ireland Act 1920 | The Government of Ireland Act, 1920. | In section ten, in subsection (2), the words from " The rates, fares, tolls," to the end of the subsection. In section twenty-one, in subsection (2), the words " any charge for the benefit of the Local Taxation (Ireland) Account, or ". In section twenty-three, in subsection (5), the words " as the case requires, either ". Subsection (2) of section thirty-four. In section forty-five, the proviso. Subsection (2) of section fifty-nine. |
| 10 & 11 Geo. 5. c. 79 | Defence of the Realm (Acquisition of Land) Act 1920 | The Defence of the Realm (Acquisition of Land) Act, 1920. | In section three, in subsection (1), paragraph (e). |
| 11 & 12 Geo. 5. c. 5 | German Reparation (Recovery) Act 1921 | The German Reparation (Recovery) Act, 1921. | The whole act. |
| 11 & 12 Geo. 5. c. 6 | Coal Mines (Decontrol) Act 1921 | The Coal Mines (Decontrol) Act, 1921. | The whole act. |
| 11 & 12 Geo. 5. c. 9 | Army and Air Force (Annual) Act 1921 | The Army and Air Force (Annual) Act, 1921. | Section four. Section ten. |
| 11 & 12 Geo. 5. c. 32 | Finance Act 1921 | The Finance Act, 1921. | In section forty-two, in subsection (2), the words " the Coal Mines (Emergency) Acts, 1920 and 1921, or of " and " and those Acts ", in so far as they extend to Northern Ireland. In section sixty-five, in subsection (1), the words from " Part II " to " Income Tax Acts ". |
| 11 & 12 Geo. 5. c. 39 | Admiralty Pensions Act 1921 | The Admiralty Pensions Act, 1921. | Subsection (1) of section two, so far as unrepealed. |
| 11 & 12 Geo. 5. c. 47 | Safeguarding of Industries Act 1921 | The Safeguarding of Industries Act, 1921. | In section fourteen, the definition of " prescribed ". |
| 11 & 12 Geo. 5. c. 49 | War Pensions Act 1921 | The War Pensions Act, 1921. | In section one, in subsection (1), the words from " and as from the date " to the end of the subsection; subsection (2); in subsection (4), the words from " and on the first constitution " to the end of the subsection; and subsections (5) and (6). Section eight. |
| 11 & 12 Geo. 5. c. 55 | Railways Act 1921 | The Railways Act, 1921. | Subsection (3) of section two. Section three. Subsection (3) of section four. Sections five and six. Subsections (1), (2) and (5) to (7) of section seven. Subsections (1) to (4) and (6) of section eight. Sections nine and ten. Subsections (3) to (10) of section eleven. Sections twelve and thirteen. Section sixty. Subsection (4) of section eighty. |
| 11 & 12 Geo. 5. c. 57 | Telegraph (Money) Act 1921 | The Telegraph (Money) Act, 1921. | The whole act. |
| 11 & 12 Geo. 5. c. 59 | Irish Railways (Settlement of Claims) Act 1921 | The Irish Railways (Settlement of Claims) Act, 1921. | The whole act. |
| 12 & 13 Geo. 5. c. 4 | Irish Free State (Agreement) Act 1922 | The Irish Free State (Agreement) Act, 1922. | In section one, in subsection (3), the proviso. |
| 12 & 13 Geo. 5. c. 17 | Finance Act 1922 | The Finance Act, 1922. | Section thirty-nine. In section forty-nine, in subsection (1), the words from " Part II " to " inhabited house duty ". |
| 12 & 13 Geo. 5. c. 19 | Gaming Act 1922 | The Gaming Act, 1922. | The whole act. |
| 12 & 13 Geo. 5. c. 43 | Post Office (Pneumatic Tubes Acquisition) Act 1922 | The Post Office (Pneumatic Tubes Acquisition) Act, 1922. | Subsection (2) of section four. The Second Schedule. |
| 12 & 13 Geo. 5. c. 45 | Telegraph (Money) Act 1922 | The Telegraph (Money) Act, 1922. | The whole act. |
| 13 Geo. 5. Sess. 2. c. 1 | Irish Free State Constitution Act 1922 | The Irish Free State Constitution Act, 1922. | In the preamble the words from " And whereas by Article seventy-four " to " rest of the United Kingdom ". In section one, the words from " but His Majesty may " to the end of the section. Section two. Section four. |
| 13 Geo. 5. Sess. 2. c. 2 | Irish Free State (Consequential Provisions) Act 1922 (Session 2) | The Irish Free State (Consequential Provisions) Act, 1922 (Session 2). | Subsection (3) of section six. In the First Schedule, in paragraph six, sub-paragraph (4). |
| 13 & 14 Geo. 5. c. 12 | Restoration of Order in Ireland (Indemnity) Act 1923 | The Restoration of Order in Ireland (Indemnity) Act, 1923. | The whole act, so far as unrepealed. |
| 13 & 14 Geo. 5. c. 14 | Finance Act 1923 | The Finance Act, 1923. | Section thirty-five. In section thirty-nine, in subsection (1), the words from " Part II " to the end of the subsection. |
| 13 & 14 Geo. 5. c. 42 | Workmen's Compensation Act 1923 | The Workmen's Compensation Act, 1923. | The whole act in so far as it extends to Northern Ireland. |
| 14 & 15 Geo. 5. c. 5 | Army and Air Force (Annual) Act 1924 | The Army and Air Force (Annual) Act, 1924. | Section four. Section six. |
| 14 & 15 Geo. 5. c. 21 | Finance Act 1924 | The Finance Act, 1924. | In section forty-one, in subsection (1), the words from " Part II " to the end of the subsection. |
| 14 & 15 Geo. 5. c. 25 | Telegraph (Money) Act 1924 | The Telegraph (Money) Act, 1924. | Section one. |
| 14 & 15 Geo. 5. c. 41 | Irish Free State (Confirmation of Agreement) Act 1924 | The Irish Free State (Confirmation of Agreement) Act, 1924. | The whole act. |
| 15 & 16 Geo. 5. c. 6 | War Charges (Validity) Act 1925 | The War Charges (Validity) Act, 1925. | The whole act. |
| 15 & 16 Geo. 5. c. 25 | Army and Air Force (Annual) Act 1925 | The Army and Air Force (Annual) Act, 1925. | Section twelve. Section sixteen, so far as unrepealed. In section seventeen, in subsection (2), paragraph (b). |
| 15 & 16 Geo. 5. c. 34 | Northern Ireland Land Act 1925 | The Northern Ireland Land Act, 1925. | In section one, in subsection (1), in paragraph (c), the words " subsection (2) of section eighteen and ". Subsection (2) of section thirty. In section thirty-two, the proviso to subsection (1) and subsection (7). |
| 15 & 16 Geo. 5. c. 36 | Finance Act 1925 | The Finance Act, 1925. | Subsections (2) and (3) of section six. Section twenty-seven. Subsection (2) of section twenty-eight. In the Second Schedule, in Part II, in paragraph one, the words in sub-paragraph (a) " not being tissue to which sub-paragraph (ab) of this heading applies " and sub-paragraphs (aa) and (ab); and in Part III, paragraph four. |
| 15 & 16 Geo. 5. c. 65 | Telegraph (Money) Act 1925 | The Telegraph (Money) Act, 1925. | The whole act. |
| 15 & 16 Geo. 5. c. 77 | Ireland (Confirmation of Agreement) Act 1925 | The Ireland (Confirmation of Agreement) Act, 1925. | In section one, in subsection (2), the proviso. |
| 15 & 16 Geo. 5. c. 87 | Tithe Act 1925 | The Tithe Act, 1925. | Subsection (1) of section one, so far as unrepealed. Section two, so far as unrepealed. Section four, so far as unrepealed. Sections six and seven, so far as unrepealed. Section nine, so far as unrepealed. Sections eleven to thirteen, so far as unrepealed. In section fourteen, in subsection (1), paragraph (a). Section seventeen, so far as unrepealed. Subsections (3) and (4) of section twenty, so far as unrepealed. Subsections (2) and (3) of section twenty-four. Section twenty-five. |
| 16 & 17 Geo. 5. c. 6 | Army and Air Force (Annual) Act 1926 | The Army and Air Force (Annual) Act, 1926. | In the Second Schedule, so much of Part I as relates to sections fifty-eight to sixty-two of the Army Act and of the Air Force Act, and Part III. |
| 16 & 17 Geo. 5. c. 22 | Finance Act 1926 | The Finance Act, 1926. | Section forty-four. Subsection (2) of section forty-seven. |
| 16 & 17 Geo. 5. c. 28 | Mining Industry Act 1926 | The Mining Industry Act, 1926. | Section nineteen. |
| 16 & 17 Geo. 5. c. 41 | Naval Reserve (Officers) Act 1926 | The Naval Reserve (Officers) Act, 1926. | Section two. |
| 17 & 18 Geo. 5. c. 10 | Finance Act 1927 | The Finance Act, 1927. | Section five, so far as unrepealed. Section fifty. Subsection (2) of section fifty-seven. The First Schedule. |
| 18 & 19 Geo. 5. c. 17 | Finance Act 1928 | The Finance Act, 1928. | Subsection (2) of section thirty-five. |
| 19 & 20 Geo. 5. c. 21 | Finance Act 1929 | The Finance Act, 1929. | In section four, in subsection (1), the words from the beginning to " aforesaid expires: ", from " as from the " to " section expires ", and " said further ", and subsection (2). Subsection (1) of section six. |
| 20 & 21 Geo. 5. c. 5 | Colonial Development Act 1929 | The Colonial Development Act, 1929. | In the long title, and in section four, the words " Palestine and " where each time occurring. |
| 20 & 21 Geo. 5. c. 22 | Army and Air Force (Annual) Act 1930 | The Army and Air Force (Annual) Act, 1930. | Subsection (3) of section five. Subsection (1) of section six. |
| 20 & 21 Geo. 5. c. 28 | Finance Act 1930 | The Finance Act, 1930. | Subsection (2) of section fifty-three. |
| 20 & 21 Geo. 5. c. 42 | Isle of Man (Customs) Act 1930 | The Isle of Man (Customs) Act, 1930. | In section four, in subsection (1), and in subsection (2), the words " at the rate of fourpence per gallon " where each time occurring. |
| 20 & 21 Geo. 5. c. 45 | Criminal Appeal (Northern Ireland) Act 1930 | The Criminal Appeal (Northern Ireland) Act, 1930. | Subsection (4) of section nineteen. |
| 21 & 22 Geo. 5. c. 14 | Army and Air Force (Annual) Act 1931 | The Army and Air Force (Annual) Act, 1931. | In section six, the words " ninety-one and ". In the Second Schedule, so much as relates to section ninety-one of the Army Act and of the Air Force Act. |
| 21 & 22 Geo. 5. c. 28 | Finance Act 1931 | The Finance Act, 1931. | Subsection (2) of section forty-four. |
| 21 & 22 Geo. 5. c. 34 | Isle of Man (Customs) Act 1931 | The Isle of Man (Customs) Act, 1931. | The whole act, so far as unrepealed. |
| 22 & 23 Geo. 5. c. 8 | Import Duties Act 1932 | The Import Duties Act, 1932. | In section one, in subsection (3), the proviso. |
| 22 & 23 Geo. 5. c. 11 | Northern Ireland (Miscellaneous Provisions) Act 1932 | The Northern Ireland (Miscellaneous Provisions) Act, 1932. | Subsection (2) of section one. |
| 22 & 23 Geo. 5. c. 22 | Army and Air Force (Annual) Act 1932 | The Army and Air Force (Annual) Act, 1932. | In the Second Schedule, so much of Part I as relates to sections sixty, sixty-four, one hundred and eighty-seven B and one hundred and eighty-seven C of the Army Act and of the Air Force Act; so much of Part II as relates to section ninety-one and to paragraph (37) of section one hundred and ninety of the Army Act and of the Air Force Act; so much of Part III as substitutes in section seventeen of the Army Act the words " any public, regimental or garrison property ", and so much as relates to sections seventy-three and one hundred and seventy-nine of the Army Act and to subsection (3) of section one hundred and fifty-six of the Army Act and of the Air Force Act. |
| 22 & 23 Geo. 5. c. 24 | Wheat Act 1932 | The Wheat Act, 1932. | Subsection (3) of section eighteen. |
| 22 & 23 Geo. 5. c. 25 | Finance Act 1932 | The Finance Act, 1932. | Subsection (2) of section thirty-one. |
| 22 & 23 Geo. 5. c. 29 | Coal Mines Act 1932 | The Coal Mines Act, 1932. | In section one, in subsection (2), the words from " (which is limited " to " thirty-two) ". |
| 22 & 23 Geo. 5. c. 32 | Patents and Designs Act 1932 | The Patents and Designs Act, 1932. | So much of the Schedule as amends subsections (1), (2) and (5) of section ninety-one of the Patents and Designs Act, 1907. |
| 22 & 23 Geo. 5. c. 41 | Isle of Man (Customs) (No. 2) Act 1932 | The Isle of Man (Customs) (No. 2) Act, 1932. | Subsection (2) of section ten. Section thirteen. |
| 23 & 24 Geo. 5. c. 19 | Finance Act 1933 | The Finance Act, 1933. | In section twenty, in subsection (1), the words and figure, " Part I of ", and the words from " shall have effect " where first occurring to " and the provisions ". Subsection (3) of section forty-seven. |
| 23 & 24 Geo. 5. c. 31 | Agricultural Marketing Act 1933 | The Agricultural Marketing Act, 1933. | Subsection (5) of section twenty-six. |
| 23 & 24 Geo. 5. c. 36 | Administration of Justice (Miscellaneous Provisions) Act 1933 | The Administration of Justice (Miscellaneous Provisions) Act, 1933. | In section one, subsection (2), and, in subsection (3), the words from " and if any such " to the end of the subsection. |
| 23 & 24 Geo. 5. c. 40 | Isle of Man (Customs) Act 1933 | The Isle of Man (Customs) Act, 1933. | Subsection (9) of section ten. In the Third Schedule, in Part V, paragraphs one to four. |
| 23 & 24 Geo. 5. c. 45 | Sea Fishing Industry Act 1933 | The Sea Fishing Industry Act, 1933. | Section six. Subsection (5) of section eight. |
| 24 & 25 Geo. 5. c. 11 | Army and Air Force (Annual) Act 1934 | The Army and Air Force (Annual) Act, 1934. | Section seven. The Second Schedule, so far as it relates to section ninety-one of the Army Act. |
| 24 & 25 Geo. 5. c. 24 | Statutory Salaries (Restoration) Act 1934 | The Statutory Salaries (Restoration) Act, 1934. | The whole act. |
| 24 & 25 Geo. 5. c. 31 | Debts Clearing Offices and Import Restrictions Act 1934 | The Debts Clearing Offices and Import Restrictions Act, 1934. | The whole act, so far as unrepealed. |
| 24 & 25 Geo. 5. c. 32 | Finance Act 1934 | The Finance Act, 1934. | Subsection (3) of section thirty. |
| 24 & 25 Geo. 5. c. 54 | Cattle Industry (Emergency Provisions) Act 1934 | The Cattle Industry (Emergency Provisions) Act, 1934. | In section one, in subsection one, the words " (hereinafter referred to as " the appropriate Ministers ")". Subsections (1) and (2) of section five. |
| 25 & 26 Geo. 5. c. 9 | Herring Industry Act 1935 | The Herring Industry Act, 1935. | Subsection (2) of section fourteen. |
| 25 & 26 Geo. 5. c. 21 | Northern Ireland Land Purchase (Winding Up) Act 1935 | The Northern Ireland Land Purchase (Winding Up) Act, 1935. | Subsection (3) of section nine. Subsection (3) of section twelve. In the Second Schedule, in paragraph (b), the words from " (including " to " Act of 1903) ". |
| 25 & 26 Geo. 5. c. 24 | Finance Act 1935 | The Finance Act, 1935. | Subsection (3) of section thirty-five. |
| 26 Geo. 5 & 1 Edw. 8. c. 21 | Cotton Spinning Industry Act 1936 | The Cotton Spinning Industry Act, 1936. | The whole act. |
| 26 Geo. 5 & 1 Edw. 8. c. 34 | Finance Act 1936 | The Finance Act, 1936. | Subsection (3) of section thirty-five. |
| 26 Geo. 5 & 1 Edw. 8. c. 39 | Firearms (Amendment) Act 1936 | The Firearms (Amendment) Act, 1936. | Subsection (3) of section sixteen and the Third Schedule, in so far as they extend to Northern Ireland. |
| 26 Geo. 5 & 1 Edw. 8. c. 43 | Tithe Act 1936 | The Tithe Act, 1936. | Subsections (2) and (3) of section two. Subsections (1), (2) and (3) of section five. Subsections (1) and (2) of section six. Subsection (2) of section seven. Section eight. Sections twenty-two and twenty-three. In section twenty-five, in subsection (4), paragraphs (b), (f) and (g). In section twenty-nine, paragraph (a), and, in paragraph (c), the words " subsections (2) and (3) of section two " and " section twenty-two and section twenty-three ". Subsection (6) of section thirty-one. In section forty-seven, in subsection (1), the words from " " ecclesiastical tithe rentcharge " " to " Ecclesiastical Commissioners ", and from " lay tithe rentcharge " to " ecclesiastical tithe rentcharge ". The First Schedule. Part I of the Third Schedule. In the Seventh Schedule, paragraphs one to four of Part II. In the Eighth Schedule, paragraphs two to four, six and seven. |
| 26 Geo. 5 & 1 Edw. 8. c. 47 | Crown Lands Act 1936 | The Crown Lands Act, 1936. | Section five. |
| 1 Edw. 8 & 1 Geo. 6. c. 33 | Diseases of Fish Act 1937 | The Diseases of Fish Act, 1937. | Subsection (2) of section two. |
| 1 Edw. 8 & 1 Geo. 6. c. 35 | Statutory Salaries Act 1937 | The Statutory Salaries Act, 1937. | The whole act, in so far as it extends to Northern Ireland. |
| 1 Edw. 8 & 1 Geo. 6. c. 50 | Livestock Industry Act 1937 | The Livestock Industry Act, 1937. | Subsection (2) of section forty-nine. |
| 1 Edw. 8 & 1 Geo. 6. c. 52 | Chairmen of Traffic Commissioners, etc. (Tenure of Office) Act 1937 | The Chairmen of Traffic Commissioners, etc. (Tenure of Office) Act, 1937. | In section one, in subsection (1), the words, " and the chairman of the appeal tribunal established by section fifteen of the Road and Rail Traffic Act, 1933" and, in subsection (2), the words from " and " in paragraph (b) to the end of paragraph (c). |
| 1 Edw. 8 & 1 Geo. 6. c. 54 | Finance Act 1937 | The Finance Act, 1937. | Subsection (3) of section thirty-four. |
| 1 Edw. 8 & 1 Geo. 6. c. 70 | Agriculture Act 1937 | The Agriculture Act 1937. | In section one, in subsection (1), the words " or basic slag ", and paragraph (b) of the proviso; in subsection (2), the words " and basic slag " ; and subsection (3). In section three, in subsection (1), the words " and basic slag ", " or basic slag " and " and of basic slag ", where they each time occur. In section four, the words " or basic slag ". In section five, the words " or basic slag ". In section thirty, in paragraph (b) of subsection (1), the words " or basic slag ". |
| 1 & 2 Geo. 6. c. 20 | Army and Air Force (Annual) Act 1938 | The Army and Air Force (Annual) Act, 1938. | Section four. Section seven. |
| 1 & 2 Geo. 6. c. 46 | Finance Act 1938 | The Finance Act, 1938. | Subsection (1) of section six. Subsection (3) of section fifty-five. |
| 1 & 2 Geo. 6. c. 48 | Criminal Procedure (Scotland) Act 1938 | The Criminal Procedure (Scotland) Act, 1938. | Section eight. |
| 1 & 2 Geo. 6. c. 68 | Isle of Man (Customs) Act 1938 | Isle of Man (Customs) Act, 1938. | In section three, in subsection (1), the words " of ninepence per gallon ". |
| 2 & 3 Geo. 6. c. 16 | Prevention of Fraud (Investments) Act 1939 | The Prevention of Fraud (Investments) Act, 1939. | Subsection (8) of section ten. |
| 2 & 3 Geo. 6. c. 17 | Army and Air Force (Annual) Act 1939 | The Army and Air Force (Annual) Act, 1939. | Section six. Section ten. Subsection (2) of section eleven. Section twelve. |
| 2 & 3 Geo. 6. c. 41 | Finance Act 1939 | The Finance Act, 1939. | Subsection (3) of section thirty-eight. |
| 2 & 3 Geo. 6. c. 45 | Mining Industry (Amendment) Act 1939 | The Mining Industry (Amendment) Act, 1939. | The whole act. |
| 2 & 3 Geo. 6. c. 48 | Agricultural Development Act 1939 | The Agricultural Development Act, 1939. | Subsection (3) of section twenty-five. Part four. In section thirty-seven, in subsection (3), the words from " In reckoning any such period " to the end of the subsection, and subsection (4). |
| 2 & 3 Geo. 6. c. 57 | War Risks Insurance Act 1939 | The War Risks Insurance Act, 1939. | In section nine A, in paragraph (b) of subsection (1) the words " or to subsection (1A) " and, in subsection (2), the words from " but notwithstanding " to the end of the subsection. In section fourteen, in subsection (3), the words from " In reckoning " to the end of the subsection. |
| 2 & 3 Geo. 6. c. 62 | Emergency Powers (Defence) Act 1939 | The Emergency Powers (Defence) Act, 1939. | In section one, in subsection (2), paragraphs (a) and (aa). In section two, in subsection (3), the words from " but, notwithstanding " to the end of the subsection. Section six. In section eleven, in subsection (1), the proviso, and subsection (2). |
| 2 & 3 Geo. 6. c. 64 | Currency (Defence) Act 1939 | The Currency (Defence) Act, 1939. | Subsection (2) of section two. |
| 2 & 3 Geo. 6. c. 82 | Personal Injuries (Emergency Provisions) Act 1939 | The Personal Injuries (Emergency Provisions) Act, 1939. | In section two, in subsection (3), the words from " In reckoning " to the end of the subsection. Sections three to five. |
| 2 & 3 Geo. 6. c. 85 | House of Commons (Service in His Majesty's Forces) Act 1939 | The House of Commons (Service in His Majesty's Forces) Act, 1939. | The whole act. |
| 2 & 3 Geo. 6. c. 89 | Trading with the Enemy Act 1939 | The Trading with the Enemy Act, 1939. | Section eight. |
| 2 & 3 Geo. 6. c. 91 | National Registration Act 1939 | The National Registration Act, 1939. | The whole act. |
| 2 & 3 Geo. 6. c. 109 | Finance (No. 2) Act 1939 | The Finance (No. 2) Act, 1939. | Subsection (3) of section twenty-four. |
| 2 & 3 Geo. 6. c. 113 | Courts (Emergency Powers) (Scotland) Act 1939 | The Courts (Emergency Powers) (Scotland) Act, 1939. | The whole act, so far as unrepealed. |
| 2 & 3 Geo. 6. c. 115 | Local Elections and Register of Electors (Temporary Provisions) Act 1939 | The Local Elections and Register of Electors (Temporary Provisions) Act, 1939. | The whole act, so far as unrepealed, in so far as it extends to Northern Ireland. |
| 2 & 3 Geo. 6. c. 118 | Prices of Goods Act 1939 | The Prices of Goods Act, 1939. | The whole act, so far as unrepealed. |
| 3 & 4 Geo. 6. c. 7 | Trade Boards and Road Haulage Wages (Emergency Provisions) Act 1940 | The Trade Boards and Road Haulage Wages (Emergency Provisions) Act, 1940. | The whole act. |
| 3 & 4 Geo. 6. c. 10 | Industrial Assurance and Friendly Societies (Emergency Protection from Forfeiture) Act 1940 | The Industrial Assurance and Friendly Societies (Emergency Protection from Forfeiture) Act, 1940. | In section two, in subsection (1), the words from "(which provides " to " in arrear) ", the words " in addition to the matters required to be stated under the said section ", " in the prescribed form " and from " in writing within " to " in the notice "; in subsection (3) the words " in the prescribed form "; and subsection (4). In section five, subsection (1) and, in subsection (3), the words from " it shall serve " to " Commissioner, and " and " in accordance with the notice ". In section six, the words from " if the Commissioner " to " have been granted; ". Section seven. In section eight, in subsection (1), the words " in the prescribed form " and from " to the society " to " specified in the notice "; in subsection (3), the words " in the prescribed form "; and, in subsection (6), the words " and seven " and from " (a) for the reference " to " section; and ". In section ten, in subsection (1), the words from " " prescribed " means " to " of Friendly Societies ". |
| 3 & 4 Geo. 6. c. 14 | Agriculture (Miscellaneous War Provisions) Act 1940 | The Agriculture (Miscellaneous War Provisions) Act, 1940. | Section eleven. |
| 3 & 4 Geo. 6. c. 15 | Solicitors (Emergency Provisions) Act 1940 | The Solicitors (Emergency Provisions) Act, 1940. | Section two. Sections five to seven. In section eight, the words from " Provincial Law Society " to " section one of the principal Act ". |
| 3 & 4 Geo. 6. c. 18 | Army and Air Force (Annual) Act 1940 | The Army and Air Force (Annual) Act, 1940. | Subsections (1) and (2) of section three. |
| 3 & 4 Geo. 6. c. 19 | Societies (Miscellaneous Provisions) Act 1940 | The Societies (Miscellaneous Provisions) Act, 1940. | In section one, in subsection (2), the words from " may dispense with " to " places and " and from "; and " at the end of paragraph (b) to the end of paragraph (c), and subsections (4) and (5). Subsection (4) of section two. Sections three and four. Section seven. |
| 3 & 4 Geo. 6. c. 20 | Emergency Powers (Defence) Act 1940 | The Emergency Powers (Defence) Act, 1940. | The whole act, so far as unrepealed. |
| 3 & 4 Geo. 6. c. 28 | Evidence and Powers of Attorney Act 1940 | The Evidence and Powers of Attorney Act, 1940. | Sections one to three. Sections five to seven. Subsection (2) of section eight. |
| 3 & 4 Geo. 6. c. 29 | Finance Act 1940 | The Finance Act, 1940. | Section eight, so far as unrepealed. Subsection (3) of section sixty-five. |
| 3 & 4 Geo. 6. c. 40 | Colonial Development and Welfare Act 1940 | The Colonial Development and Welfare Act, 1940. | In section two, in the proviso to subsection (2), the words from the beginning of paragraph (a) to " ; or " at the end of that paragraph. In section three, subsections (1) and (2); in subsection (3), the figure and word " II and " and in paragraph (a), the words from the beginning of sub-paragraph (i) to " ; and " at end of that sub-paragraph, and, in paragraph (b), the words from the beginning of sub-paragraph (i) to " ; and " at end of that sub-paragraph; and subsections (4) and (5). Parts I, II and IV of the Schedule. |
| 3 & 4 Geo. 6. c. 45 | Emergency Powers (Defence) (No. 2) Act 1940 | The Emergency Powers (Defence) (No. 2) Act, 1940. | The whole act. |
| 3 & 4 Geo. 6. c. 48 | Finance (No. 2) Act 1940 | The Finance (No. 2) Act, 1940. | Subsection (3) of section forty-two. |
| 3 & 4 Geo. 6. c. 49 | Isle of Man (Customs) Act 1940 | The Isle of Man (Customs) Act, 1940. | The whole act, so far as unrepealed. |
| 4 & 5 Geo. 6. c. 5 | Railways Agreement (Powers) Act 1940 | The Railways Agreement (Powers) Act, 1940. | The whole act. |
| 4 & 5 Geo. 6. c. 8 | House of Commons Disqualification (Temporary Provisions) Act 1941 | The House of Commons Disqualification (Temporary Provisions) Act, 1941. | The whole act. |
| 4 & 5 Geo. 6. c. 12 | War Damage Act 1941 | The War Damage Act, 1941. | In section seventy-five, subsection (3); and, in subsection (4), the words " and section eleven A ", and " or subsection (1A) ". Subsection (3) of section seventy-eight. |
| 4 & 5 Geo. 6. c. 23 | Temporary Migration of Children (Guardianship) Act 1941 | The Temporary Migration of Children (Guardianship) Act, 1941. | The whole act. |
| 4 & 5 Geo. 6. c. 24 | Liabilities (War-Time Adjustment) Act 1941 | The Liabilities (War-Time Adjustment) Act, 1941. | In section one, in subsection (2), paragraph (b) of the proviso, and subsections (4), (8) and (9). In section two, in subsection (1), the words from " and shall appoint " to " be necessary;" and from " and any such " to the end of the subsection; subsections (2), (3) and (4); and in subsection (5), the words from the beginning to " district, and " and " or subordinate officer " where next occurring. In section three, in subsection (1), the words from " and any such application " to the end of the subsection; in subsection (2), paragraph (c), and subsections (4) and (5). Subsection (2) of section four. Subsection (4) of section ten. In section eleven, in subsection (2), the words " or under section three of this Act,". In section fourteen, in subsection (1), the words from " and no application " to " in respect of the firm "; subsections (5) to (8), and in subsection (9), the words from the beginning to " this Act, but ". In section fifteen, subsection (2); in subsection (3), the words from the beginning to " business; and "; in subsection (6), in paragraph (a), the words from " or bankruptcy " to " bankruptcy petition ", and from " or, as the " to " winding-up petition ", and subsection (8). In section sixteen, subsection (2), and in subsection (3) the words from " but section one " to the end of the subsection. Subsection (3) of section seventeen. Subsections (3) and (4) of section twenty. Subsections (1), (3), (4) and (5) of section twenty-four. Section twenty-five. |
| 4 & 5 Geo. 6. c. 30 | Finance Act 1941 | The Finance Act, 1941. | Section three. Subsection (3) of section fifty-two. |
| 4 & 5 Geo. 6. c. 31 | Goods and Services (Price Control) Act 1941 | The Goods and Services (Price Control) Act, 1941. | The whole act, so far as unrepealed. |
| 4 & 5 Geo. 6. c. 47 | Marriage (Members of His Majesty's Forces) Act 1941 | The Marriage (Members of His Majesty's Forces) Act, 1941. | The whole act, so far as unrepealed. |
| 4 & 5 Geo. 6. c. 50 | Agriculture (Miscellaneous Provisions) Act 1941 | The Agriculture (Miscellaneous Provisions) Act, 1941. | Subsection (1) of section one. |
| 5 & 6 Geo. 6. c. 1 | Arthur Jenkins Indemnity Act 1941 | The Arthur Jenkins Indemnity Act, 1941. | The whole act. |
| 5 & 6 Geo. 6. c. 9 | Restoration of Pre-War Trade Practices Act 1942 | The Restoration of Pre-War Trade Practices Act, 1942. | In section thirteen, in paragraph (e), the words " a board of guardians ", " or board of guardians ", and " or boards ". |
| 5 & 6 Geo. 6. c. 11 | Ministers of the Crown and House of Commons Disqualification Act 1942 | The Ministers of the Crown and House of Commons Disqualification Act, 1942. | The whole act. |
| 5 & 6 Geo. 6. c. 15 | Army and Air Force (Annual) Act 1942 | The Army and Air Force (Annual) Act, 1942. | Section five. |
| 5 & 6 Geo. 6. c. 20 | Marriage (Scotland) Act 1942 | The Marriage (Scotland) Act, 1942. | Section one. |
| 5 & 6 Geo. 6. c. 21 | Finance Act 1942 | The Finance Act, 1942. | Subsection (4) of section forty-nine. |
| 5 & 6 Geo. 6. c. 26 | Pensions (Mercantile Marine) Act 1942 | The Pensions (Mercantile Marine) Act, 1942. | Section seven. |
| 6 & 7 Geo. 6. c. 10 | House of Commons Disqualification (Temporary Provisions) Act 1943 | The House of Commons Disqualification (Temporary Provisions) Act, 1943. | The whole act. |
| 6 & 7 Geo. 6. c. 15 | Army and Air Force (Annual) Act 1943 | The Army and Air Force (Annual) Act, 1943. | Section nine. Subsection (1) of section eleven. |
| 6 & 7 Geo. 6. c. 19 | Courts (Emergency Powers) Act 1943 | The Courts (Emergency Powers) Act, 1943. | The whole act, so far as unrepealed. |
| 6 & 7 Geo. 6. c. 28 | Finance Act 1943 | The Finance Act, 1943. | Subsection (3) of section thirty-one. |
| 6 & 7 Geo. 6. c. 35 | Foreign Service Act 1943 | The Foreign Service Act, 1943. | In the Schedule, so much as relates to the Consular Salaries and Fees Act, 1891, and the British Nationality and Status of Aliens Act, 1914; the words from " (a) as respects the " to " subsequent financial year "; and so much as relates to the Evidence (Foreign, Dominion and Colonial Documents) Act, 1933. |
| 6 & 7 Geo. 6. c. 47 | Price Control (Regulation of Disposal of Stocks) Act 1943 | The Price Control (Regulation of Disposal of Stocks) Act, 1943. | The whole act. |
| 7 & 8 Geo. 6. c. 6 | Courts (Emergency Powers) (Scotland) Act 1944 | The Courts (Emergency Powers) (Scotland) Act, 1944. | The whole act. |
| 7 & 8 Geo. 6. c. 11 | House of Commons Disqualification (Temporary Provisions) Act 1944 | The House of Commons Disqualification (Temporary Provisions) Act, 1944. | The whole act. |
| 7 & 8 Geo. 6. c. 23 | Finance Act 1944 | The Finance Act, 1944. | Subsection (4) of section forty-nine. |
| 7 & 8 Geo. 6. c. 28 | Agriculture (Miscellaneous Provisions) Act 1944 | The Agriculture (Miscellaneous Provisions) Act, 1944. | Section four. |
| 7 & 8 Geo. 6. c. 32 | Herring Industry Act 1944 | The Herring Industry Act, 1944. | So much of the Schedule as relates to the Herring Industry Act, 1938. |
| 7 & 8 Geo. 6. c. 35 | National Fire Service Regulations (Indemnity) Act 1944 | The National Fire Service Regulations (Indemnity) Act, 1944. | The whole act. |
| 7 & 8 Geo. 6. c. 40 | Liabilities (War-Time Adjustment) Act 1944 | The Liabilities (War-Time Adjustment) Act, 1944. | Subsections (3) to (9) of section two. Section three. In section four, in subsection (2), the words from " and paragraph (ii) " to the end of the subsection. Subsection (4) of section eight. Sections thirteen and fourteen. In section twenty-one, the words from " " the principal debt " " to " shall be construed accordingly ". In the Second Schedule, so much as relates to subsection (2) of section one, to subsection (4) of section two, to subsections (2) and (4) of section three, to subsections (1) and (4) of section ten, to sections fourteen, fifteen and sixteen, to subsection (3) of section twenty, and to section twenty-four, of the principal Act. |
| 8 & 9 Geo. 6. c. 12 | Northern Ireland (Miscellaneous Provisions) Act 1945 | The Northern Ireland (Miscellaneous Provisions) Act, 1945. | Subsection (1) of section four. Subsection (2) of section twelve. The Schedule. |
| 8 & 9 Geo. 6. c. 18 | Local Authorities Loans Act 1945 | The Local Authorities Loans Act, 1945. | Section one. In section nine, in subsection (1), the words from " but section one " to the end of the subsection, and subsection (3). |
| 8 & 9 Geo. 6. c. 19 | Ministry of Fuel and Power Act 1945 | The Ministry of Fuel and Power Act, 1945. | Subsection (4) of section three. Subsection (2) of section seven. |
| 8 & 9 Geo. 6. c. 44 | Treason Act 1945 | The Treason Act, 1945. | The Schedule, except in so far as it relates to the Treason Act, 1695, and the Treason Act, 1708. |
| 9 & 10 Geo. 6. c. 8 | War Damage (Valuation Appeals) Act 1945 | The War Damage (Valuation Appeals) Act, 1945. | The whole act. |
| 9 & 10 Geo. 6. c. 10 | Supplies and Services (Transitional Powers) Act 1945 | The Supplies and Services (Transitional Powers) Act, 1945. | Subsection (2) of section two. In section four, in subsection (1), the words from " in accordance with " to " section and " and from " In reckoning " to the end of the subsection, and subsection (2). |
| 9 & 10 Geo. 6. c. 13 | Finance (No. 2) Act 1945 | The Finance (No. 2) Act, 1945. | Subsection (3) of section sixty-two. |
| 9 & 10 Geo. 6. c. 18 | Statutory Orders (Special Procedure) Act 1945 | The Statutory Orders (Special Procedure) Act, 1945. | The Second Schedule, so far as it relates to the Local Government (Boundary Commission) Act, 1945. |
| 9 & 10 Geo. 6. c. 22 | Dock Workers (Regulation of Employment) Act 1946 | The Dock Workers (Regulation of Employment) Act, 1946. | In section two, in subsection (8), the words from " In reckoning " to the end of the subsection. Section three. Paragraph four of the Schedule. |
| 9 & 10 Geo. 6. c. 26 | Emergency Laws (Transitional Provisions) Act 1946 | The Emergency Laws (Transitional Provisions) Act, 1946. | Section two. Subsection (3) of section three. Sections four and five. Sections ten to thirteen. In section fourteen, in subsection (1), the words from " In reckoning " to the end of the subsection, and subsection (2). Subsection (2) of section twenty-two. In the First Schedule, in Part III, paragraphs five, six and nine. |
| 9 & 10 Geo. 6. c. 30 | Trunk Roads Act 1946 | The Trunk Roads Act, 1946. | So much of the Fourth Schedule as relates to subsection (3) of section six of the Trunk Roads Act, 1936. |
| 9 & 10 Geo. 6. c. 31 | Ministers of the Crown (Transfer of Functions) Act 1946 | The Ministers of the Crown (Transfer of Functions) Act, 1946. | In section seven, in subsection (1), paragraph (a) and the words " and subsection (2) of section ten shall cease to have effect " and subsection (2). |
| 9 & 10 Geo. 6. c. 32 | Agricultural Development (Ploughing Up of Land) Act 1946 | The Agricultural Development (Ploughing Up of Land) Act, 1946. | The whole act. |
| 9 & 10 Geo. 6. c. 47 | Army and Air Force (Annual) Act 1946 | The Army and Air Force (Annual) Act, 1946. | In section three, the words from " and in section eighty-five " to " completed twenty-one years service) " and the words " in both places where those words occur ". |
| 9 & 10 Geo. 6. c. 49 | Acquisition of Land (Authorisation Procedure) Act 1946 | The Acquisition of Land (Authorisation Procedure) Act, 1946. | In section one, in subsection (1), the words " and the next following ", and subsection (6). Section two. In section seven, in subsection (1), the proviso, and in subsection (3), the words " made after the expiration of two years from the commencement of this Act ". Subsection (4) of section ten. Part IV of the Second Schedule. The Third Schedule. So much of the Fourth Schedule as amends the Electric Lighting Act, 1909, the Housing (Scotland) Act, 1925, and the Fourth Schedule to the Water (Scotland) Act, 1946. |
| 9 & 10 Geo. 6. c. 60 | Superannuation Act 1946 | The Superannuation Act, 1946. | Subsections (2) and (3) of section seven. Paragraphs six to eight of the Second Schedule. |
| 9 & 10 Geo. 6. c. 62 | National Insurance (Industrial Injuries) Act 1946 | The National Insurance (Industrial Injuries) Act, 1946. | In section thirty-two, in subsection (1), the words " penal servitude ". In section fifty-nine, in subsection (1), in paragraph (b), the words from " during the period " where they first occur to " and thereafter ". Subsections (3) and (4) of section eighty-seven. Subsection (1) of section eighty-nine, in so far as it extends to Northern Ireland. The Ninth Schedule, in so far as it extends to Northern Ireland. |
| 9 & 10 Geo. 6. c. 64 | Finance Act 1946 | The Finance Act, 1946. | Subsection (4) of section nine. Subsection (4) of section sixty-seven. |
| 9 & 10 Geo. 6. c. 67 | National Insurance Act 1946 | The National Insurance Act, 1946. | In section twenty-nine, in subsection (1), in paragraph (b), the words " penal servitude ". In section thirty-nine, in subsection (1), the words in paragraph (b) from " during the period " where they first occur to " and thereafter ". Subsection (5) of section sixty-eight. In section sixty-nine, in subsection (1), paragraphs (a), (b) and (d), and subsections (2), (3) and (6). Subsections (2) and (3) of section seventy. In section seventy-three, in subsection (1), the words " subject to the following provisions of this section " and from " and different " to the end of the subsection, and subsections (2) to (5). Subsections (4) and (5) of section seventy-six. Paragraph (l) of section seventy-nine. In the Eleventh Schedule, so much as relates to the National Service (Armed Forces) Act, 1939. |
| 9 & 10 Geo. 6. c. 73 | Hill Farming Act 1946 | The Hill Farming Act, 1946. | In section thirty-seven, in subsection (1), the words from " In reckoning the period " to the end of the subsection, and subsection (2). |
| 9 & 10 Geo. 6. c. 76 | Unemployment Insurance (Eire Volunteers) Act 1946 | The Unemployment Insurance (Eire Volunteers) Act, 1946. | In section five, in subsection (1), the words from " so however, that " to the end of the subsection, and subsections (2) and (3). |
| 10 & 11 Geo. 6. c. 5 | Greenwich Hospital Act 1947 | The Greenwich Hospital Act, 1947. | Section one. |
| 10 & 11 Geo. 6. c. 8 | Road Traffic (Driving Licences) Act 1947 | The Road Traffic (Driving Licences) Act, 1947. | Section one. |
| 10 & 11 Geo. 6. c. 16 | Summer Time Act 1947 | The Summer Time Act, 1947. | Subsection (1) of section one. |
| 10 & 11 Geo. 6. c. 19 | Polish Resettlement Act 1947 | The Polish Resettlement Act, 1947. | Subsections (1), (3) and (4) of section two, so far as unrepealed. In section four, in subsection (1), the words from " medical needs as " to " 1934 or other ". Section five. In section six, in subsection (1), the words " or members of any of the Polish resettlement forces ". Sections eight and nine. In section ten, in subsection (1), the definition of the " General Medical Council ". Subsection (2) of section twelve. Part I of the Schedule, so far as unrepealed. |
| 10 & 11 Geo. 6. c. 35 | Finance Act 1947 | The Finance Act, 1947. | Subsection (6) of section three. In section four, in subsection (4), the words from " In reckoning " to the end of the subsection, and subsection (5). Subsections (1) and (8) of section five. Section thirteen. Subsection (5) of section thirty-three. In section fifty-six, in subsection (1), the words from the beginning to " as a notary public ; and ". In the Eighth Schedule, in Part I, sub-paragraph (4) of paragraph one. Part I of the Eleventh Schedule. |
| 10 & 11 Geo. 6. c. 37 | Northern Ireland Act 1947 | The Northern Ireland Act, 1947. | In section eight, paragraph (a) of subsection (1). |
| 10 & 11 Geo. 6. c. 42 | Acquisition of Land (Authorisation Procedure) (Scotland) Act 1947 | The Acquisition of Land (Authorisation Procedure) (Scotland) Act, 1947. | In section one, in subsection (1), the words " and the next following ". Section two. In section six, in subsection (1), the proviso, and, in subsection (3), the words " made after the seventeenth day of April, nineteen hundred and forty-eight ". Subsection (3) of section eight. Part III of the Second Schedule. The Third Schedule. |
| 10 & 11 Geo. 6. c. 44 | Crown Proceedings Act 1947 | The Crown Proceedings Act, 1947. | In section thirty-four, in subsection (5), and in section fifty-three, in subsection (7), the words, where each time occurring, from " notwithstanding anything " to the end of the subsection. |
| 10 & 11 Geo. 6. c. 48 | Agriculture Act 1947 | The Agriculture Act, 1947. | In section seven, in subsection (3), the words from " In reckoning " to the end of the subsection. In section ninety-two, in subsection (1), the proviso. In section ninety-three, in subsection (1), in paragraph (b), the words " except section two of the last mentioned Act ". In section one hundred and eight, in subsection (1), the words from " In reckoning " to the end of the subsection. |
| 10 & 11 Geo. 6. c. 49 | Transport Act 1947 | The Transport Act, 1947. | In section eight, the words " (except section two thereof) ". |
| 11 & 12 Geo. 6. c. 1 | Expiring Laws Continuance Act 1947 | The Expiring Laws Continuance Act, 1947. | The whole act. |
| 11 & 12 Geo. 6. c. 3 | Burma Independence Act 1947 | The Burma Independence Act, 1947. | Subsections (4) and (5) of section three. In section four, subsection (1), and, in subsection (2), the words from " and any proceedings " to the end of the subsection. |
| 11 & 12 Geo. 6. c. 7 | Ceylon Independence Act 1947 | The Ceylon Independence Act, 1947. | In section four, in subsection (4), the words from " so however ", to the end of the subsection, and subsection (5). |
| 11 & 12 Geo. 6. c. 8 | Mandated and Trust Territories Act 1947 | The Mandated and Trust Territories Act, 1947. | In section one, in subsection (6), the words from " In reckoning " to the end of the subsection, and subsection (7). |
| 11 & 12 Geo. 6. c. 9 | Finance (No. 2) Act 1947 | The Finance (No. 2) Act, 1947. | In section nine, in subsection (2), paragraphs (a), (b) and (c). |
| 11 & 12 Geo. 6. c. 10 | Emergency Laws (Miscellaneous Provisions) Act 1947 | The Emergency Laws (Miscellaneous Provisions) Act, 1947. | In section one, in subsection (1), paragraph (a), and, in subsection (2), the proviso. Subsection (1) of section three. Subsection (4) of section four. Section five, so far as unrepealed. Section six. In section eleven, in subsection (1), the words from " (which requires " to " Aviation) " and from " and any transaction " to the end of the subsection. In the First Schedule, Part I; Part II except in so far as it relates to regulation seventy-six of the Defence (General) Regulations, 1939, so much of Part III as relates to regulations two BA (in so far as extending to Northern Ireland), twelve, fourteen, sixteen, twenty AB, twenty-two, twenty-three CB, twenty-three CC, thirty-two A, thirty-two AA, thirty-three, thirty-nine, forty-two C, forty-two CA, forty-five A, fifty, fifty B, fifty-five C, sixty, sixty AB, sixty C, sixty CC, and eighty-nine of the Defence (General) Regulations, 1939 and to Defence (Administration of Justice) Regulations, 1940, regulations twenty-one and twenty-eight A, and the Third Schedule of the Defence (Agriculture and Fisheries) Regulations, 1939, regulations two and three of Defence (Armed Forces) Regulations, 1939, Defence (Companies) Regulations, 1940, Defence (Evacuated Areas) Regulations, 1940, Defence (Functions of Ministers) Regulations, 1941, Defence (Industrial Assurance) Regulations, 1943, Defence (Parliamentary Under-Secretaries) Regulations, 1940, regulations five A, seven, eight and nine of Defence (Patents, Trade Marks, etc.) Regulations, 1941, Defence (Trading with the Enemy) Regulations, 1940, Defence (War Risks Insurance) Regulations, 1940, Defence (War Risks Insurance) (No. 2) Regulations, 1940, Defence (War Risks Insurance) (No. 4) Regulations, 1940, Defence (War Risks Insurance) Regulations, 1945, and Defence (Womens Forces) Regulations, 1941; and Part IV. |
| 11 & 12 Geo. 6. c. 11 | Medical Practitioners and Pharmacists Act 1947 | The Medical Practitioners and Pharmacists Act, 1947. | Subsection (3) of section eleven. |
| 11 & 12 Geo. 6. c. 15 | Overseas Resources Development Act 1948 | The Overseas Resources Development Act, 1948. | Subsections (2) to (5) of section five. In section eleven, in subsection (3), in paragraph (a), the words from " in the case of ", where occurring the first time, to the end of that paragraph, and, in paragraph (b), from " in the case of ", where occurring the first time to the end of that paragraph. In section twelve, in subsection (1), the words from " in the case of ", where occurring the first time, to the end of the subsection. |
| 11 & 12 Geo. 6. c. 28 | Army and Air Force (Annual) Act 1948 | The Army and Air Force (Annual) Act, 1948. | The Preamble. Section two. |
| 11 & 12 Geo. 6. c. 29 | National Assistance Act 1948 | The National Assistance Act, 1948. | Subsections (5) and (7) of section ten. Subsection (3) of section thirty. Subsection (7) of section fifty. In section fifty-eight, subsection (3), and, in subsection (4), the words " (other than section two thereof) ". In the Fourth Schedule, sub-paragraph (4) of paragraph one, sub-paragraph (2) of paragraph two, and paragraphs four, six and seven. In the Sixth Schedule, paragraph one, sub-paragraphs (3) (b) and (3) (i) of paragraph two, sub-paragraphs (1) and (3) of paragraph three, sub-paragraph (1) of paragraph five, and paragraph eighteen. |
| 11 & 12 Geo. 6. c. 34 | Motor Spirit (Regulation) Act 1948 | The Motor Spirit (Regulation) Act, 1948. | The whole act |
| 11 & 12 Geo. 6. c. 38 | Companies Act 1948 | The Companies Act, 1948. | In section four hundred and fifty-nine, in subsection (1), the words " The enactments mentioned ", and " first and second columns of Part I of the "; the words from " are hereby " to " that Schedule,", where firstly occurring; the words from " so far as " to " this subsection ", and from " and paragraph (2) " to the end of the subsection; and, in so far as they extend to Northern Ireland, subsections (2) to (17). Part I of the Seventeenth Schedule. |
| 11 & 12 Geo. 6. c. 43 | Children Act 1948 | The Children Act, 1948. | In section twenty-nine, in subsection (3), the words from " (a) if the home " to " any other case ". Subsection (2) of section fifty-five. In the Second Schedule, sub-paragraph (2) of paragraph eight, and paragraphs nine and eleven. |
| 11 & 12 Geo. 6. c. 45 | Agriculture (Scotland) Act 1948 | The Agriculture (Scotland) Act, 1948. | In section sixty-three, in subsection (1), the proviso. |
| 11 & 12 Geo. 6. c. 49 | Finance Act 1948 | The Finance Act, 1948. | Subsections (3) to (6) of section one. Section thirteen. Subsection (4) of section seventeen. Subsections (4) and (10) of section eighty-two. The Eleventh Schedule. |
| 11 & 12 Geo. 6. c. 51 | White Fish and Herring Industries Act 1948 | White Fish and Herring Industries Act, 1948. | In section five, in subsection (3), the words from " (which authorises " to " of that Act) " and from " Provided that " to " forty-nine ". Subsection (9) of section seven. |
| 11 & 12 Geo. 6. c. 58 | Criminal Justice Act 1948 | The Criminal Justice Act, 1948. | In section eighty-two, the words and figures from " Part III of " to " the said Part III ". So much of subsection (3) of section eighty-three and of Part III of the Tenth Schedule as extends to Northern Ireland. |
| 11 & 12 Geo. 6. c. 61 | Isle of Man (Customs) Act 1948 | The Isle of Man (Customs) Act, 1948. | Section seven. |
| 11 & 12 Geo. 6. c. 64 | National Service Act 1948 | The National Service Act, 1948. | Subsection (1) of section sixty. The Sixth Schedule. |
| 11 & 12 Geo. 6. c. 65 | Representation of the People Act 1948 | The Representation of the People Act, 1948. | Subsection (5) of section seventy-four. In section eighty, in subsection (7), the words from the beginning to " Provided that ", and paragraph (b). In the Tenth Schedule, paragraph eight of Part I, so far as unrepealed, and paragraph three of Part II. The Eleventh Schedule. The Thirteenth Schedule. |
| 12, 13 & 14 Geo. 6. c. 3 | Expiring Laws Continuance Act 1948 | The Expiring Laws Continuance Act, 1948. | The whole act. |
| 12, 13 & 14 Geo. 6. c. 11 | Railway and Canal Commission (Abolition) Act 1949 | The Railway and Canal Commission (Abolition) Act, 1949. | Subsection (2) of section two. In section three, in subsection (1), the words from " and section eight " to the end of the subsection. Section five. Subsection (2) of section eight. The Schedule. |
| 12, 13 & 14 Geo. 6. c. 27 | Juries Act 1949 | The Juries Act, 1949. | Section twenty-one. In section thirty-five, in subsection (3), the words from the beginning to " Provided that ". The Second and Third Schedules. |
| 12, 13 & 14 Geo. 6. c. 28 | Army and Air Force (Annual) Act 1949 | The Army and Air Force (Annual) Act, 1949. | The Preamble. Section two. Subsection (2) of section three. |
| 12, 13 & 14 Geo. 6. c. 38 | Agricultural Marketing Act 1949 | The Agricultural Marketing Act, 1949. | Sections thirteen and fourteen. In section twenty, in subsection (2), the words from the beginning to " Provided that ". The Schedule. |
| 12, 13 & 14 Geo. 6. c. 42 | Lands Tribunal Act 1949 | The Lands Tribunal Act, 1949. | The Second Schedule, except in so far as it relates to the Small Holdings and Allotments Act, 1908. |
| 12, 13 & 14 Geo. 6. c. 43 | Merchant Shipping (Safety Convention) Act 1949 | The Merchant Shipping (Safety Convention) Act, 1949. | Subsection (1) of section thirteen. Subsection (3) of section thirty-five. Subsection (5) of section thirty-seven. The Third Schedule. |
| 12, 13 & 14 Geo. 6. c. 44 | Superannuation Act 1949 | The Superannuation Act, 1949. | Subsection (6) of section thirty-nine. Subsection (2) of section sixty-four. The Third Schedule. |
| 12, 13 & 14 Geo. 6. c. 47 | Finance Act 1949 | The Finance Act, 1949. | Subsection (1) of section three. Section nine, so far as unrepealed. Subsection (3) of section ten. Subsection (2) of section eleven. In section fifty-two, subsection (3) and, in subsection (7), paragraph (a). In the Eleventh Schedule, Parts I to VII, except, in each Part, the saving. |
| 12, 13 & 14 Geo. 6. c. 53 | Coal Industry Act 1949 | The Coal Industry Act, 1949. | Section three. Section six. |
| 12, 13 & 14 Geo. 6. c. 58 | Isle of Man (Customs) Act 1949 | The Isle of Man (Customs) Act, 1949. | Section six. Subsection (3) of section seven. The Third Schedule. |
| 12, 13 & 14 Geo. 6. c. 66 | House of Commons (Redistribution of Seats) Act 1949 | The House of Commons (Redistribution of Seats) Act, 1949. | Subsection (1) of section eight. The Third Schedule. |
| 12, 13 & 14 Geo. 6. c. 67 | Civil Aviation Act 1949 | The Civil Aviation Act, 1949. | Subsection (1) of section seventy. The Twelfth Schedule. |
| 12, 13 & 14 Geo. 6. c. 68 | Representation of the People Act 1949 | The Representation of the People Act, 1949. | Subsection (1) of section one hundred and seventy-five. The Ninth Schedule. |
| 12, 13 & 14 Geo. 6. c. 71 | Expiring Laws Continuance Act 1949 | The Expiring Laws Continuance Act, 1949. | The whole act. |
| 12, 13 & 14 Geo. 6. c. 74 | Coast Protection Act 1949 | The Coast Protection Act, 1949. | Subsection (9) of section eighteen. Subsection (5) of section thirty-four. Subsection (1) of section thirty-nine. Section forty-eight. The Third Schedule. |
| 12, 13 & 14 Geo. 6. c. 76 | Marriage Act 1949 | The Marriage Act, 1949. | The Fifth Schedule, except in so far as it relates to the Marriages Validity Act, 1899, the Naval Marriages Act, 1908, and section one of the Marriage Act, 1939. |
| 12, 13 & 14 Geo. 6. c. 78 | Married Women (Restraint upon Anticipation) Act 1949 | The Married Women (Restraint upon Anticipation) Act, 1949. | Subsection (4) of section one. The Second Schedule. |
| 12, 13 & 14 Geo. 6. c. 80 | Telegraph Act 1949 | The Telegraph Act, 1949. | The whole act. |
| 12, 13 & 14 Geo. 6. c. 86 | Electoral Registers Act 1949 | The Electoral Registers Act, 1949. | Subsection (2) of section three. Subsection (3) of section five. The Third Schedule. |
| 12, 13 & 14 Geo. 6. c. 87 | Patents Act 1949 | The Patents Act, 1949. | The Second Schedule, except in so far as it relates to the Patents and Designs Act, 1907. |
| 12, 13 & 14 Geo. 6. c. 88 | Registered Designs Act 1949 | The Registered Designs Act, 1949. | The Second Schedule, except in so far as it relates to the Patents and Designs Act, 1907. |
| 12, 13 & 14 Geo. 6. c. 89 | Vehicles (Excise) Act 1949 | The Vehicles (Excise) Act, 1949. | Subsection (1) of section thirty. Paragraphs three and four of the Sixth Schedule. The Seventh Schedule. |
| 12, 13 & 14 Geo. 6. c. 90 | Election Commissioners Act 1949 | The Election Commissioners Act, 1949. | Subsection (1) of section twenty-one. The Schedule. |
| 12, 13 & 14 Geo. 6. c. 91 | Air Corporations Act 1949 | The Air Corporations Act, 1949. | Subsection (1) of section forty-one. The Third Schedule. |
| 12, 13 & 14 Geo. 6. c. 96 | Auxiliary and Reserve Forces Act 1949 | The Auxiliary and Reserve Forces Act, 1949. | In section three, in subsection (6), paragraphs (b) and (c). Subsection (3) of section sixteen. The Second Schedule. |
| 12, 13 & 14 Geo. 6. c. 101 | Justices of the Peace Act 1949 | The Justices of the Peace Act, 1949. | In section fifteen, in subsection (7), the words " and in section thirteen of the Money Payments (Justices Procedure) Act, 1935 ". |
| 14 Geo. 6. c. 2 | Post Office and Telegraph (Money) Act 1950 | The Post Office and Telegraph (Money) Act, 1950. | Subsections (1) and (6) of section two. The Schedule. |
| 14 Geo. 6. c. 3 | Army and Air Force (Annual) Act 1950 | The Army and Air Force (Annual) Act, 1950. | The Preamble. Sections two and three. In section ten, the words " for repealing provisions which have become spent or otherwise ". Section eleven. Paragraph one of the First Schedule. The Second Schedule. |
| 14 Geo. 6. c. 5 | Newfoundland (Consequential Provisions) Act 1950 | The Newfoundland (Consequential Provisions) Act, 1950. | Subsection (2) of section one. Part II of the Schedule. |
| 14 Geo. 6. c. 6 | Statute Law Revision Act 1950 | The Statute Law Revision Act, 1950. | Section one. The First, Second and Third Schedules. |
| 14 Geo. 6. c. 9 | Merchant Shipping Act 1950 | The Merchant Shipping Act, 1950. | Subsection (8) of section three. |
| 14 Geo. 6. c. 14 | International Organisations (Immunities and Privileges) Act 1950 | The International Organisations (Immunities and Privileges) Act, 1950. | Subsection (1) of section seven. |
| 14 Geo. 6. c. 15 | Finance Act 1950 | The Finance Act, 1950. | Subsection (6) of section thirteen. Section fourteen, so far as unrepealed. Subsection (3) of section sixteen. Subsection (2) of section thirty-eight, in so far as it extends to Northern Ireland. Subsections (3) and (8) of section fifty. The Eighth Schedule. |
| 14 Geo. 6. c. 19 | Isle of Man (Customs) Act 1950 | The Isle of Man (Customs) Act, 1950. | Section four. Subsection (2) of section seven. Subsection (2) of section eight. The Schedule. |
| 14 Geo. 6. c. 21 | Miscellaneous Financial Provisions Act 1950 | The Miscellaneous Financial Provisions Act, 1950. | Subsection (2) of section five. The Schedule. |
| 14 Geo. 6. c. 24 | Highways (Provision of Cattle-Grids) Act 1950 | The Highways (Provision of Cattle-Grids) Act, 1950. | In section eight, in subsection (2), the proviso. |
| 14 Geo. 6. c. 26 | Adoption Act 1950 | The Adoption Act, 1950. | Subsection (1) of section forty-six. The Fourth Schedule. |
| 14 Geo. 6. c. 32 | Army Reserve Act 1950 | The Army Reserve Act, 1950. | Subsection (2) of section twenty-nine. The Third Schedule, except in so far as it relates to the Territorial and Reserve Forces Act, 1907, and the Auxiliary and Reserve Forces Act, 1949. |
| 14 Geo. 6. c. 33 | Air Force Reserve Act 1950 | The Air Force Reserve Act, 1950. | Subsection (2) of section twenty-eight. Part II of the Third Schedule. |
| 14 Geo. 6. c. 36 | Diseases of Animals Act 1950 | The Diseases of Animals Act, 1950. | Subsection (1) of section eighty-nine. The Fifth Schedule. |
| 14 Geo. 6. c. 37 | Maintenance Orders Act 1950 | The Maintenance Orders Act, 1950. | Section thirty. |
| 14 & 15 Geo. 6. c. 1 | Expiring Laws Continuance Act 1950 | The Expiring Laws Continuance Act, 1950. | The whole act. |
| 14 & 15 Geo. 6. c. 9 | Restoration of Pre-War Trade Practices Act 1950 | The Restoration of Pre-War Trade Practices Act, 1950. | Subsection (4) of section three. |
| 14 & 15 Geo. 6. c. 20 | Overseas Resources Development Act 1951 | The Overseas Resources Development Act, 1951. | In section one, in subsection (4), the words from " and in relation to " to the end of the subsection. |
| 14 & 15 Geo. 6. c. 29 | Reverend J. G. MacManaway's Indemnity Act 1951 | The Reverend J. G. MacManaway's Indemnity Act, 1951. | The whole act. |
| 14 & 15 Geo. 6. c. 34 | National Insurance Act 1951 | The National Insurance Act, 1951. | Subsection (2) of section one. Subsection (1) of section two. Subsections (1) and (3) of section three. Subsection (1) of section four. Section five. Subsection (1) of section nine. |
| 14 & 15 Geo. 6. c. 43 | Finance Act 1951 | The Finance Act, 1951. | Subsection (3) of section forty-four. |
| 14 & 15 Geo. 6. c. 51 | Isle of Man (Customs) Act 1951 | The Isle of Man (Customs) Act, 1951. | Subsection (4) of section one. Section two. Subsection (5) of section three. |
| 15 & 16 Geo. 6 & 1 Eliz. 2. c. 33 | Finance Act 1952 | The Finance Act, 1952. | Subsections (2) and (3) of section one. |

==== Second schedule: Acts of the Irish Parliament ====
Second schedule — Acts of the Irish Parliament
| Citation | Short title | Description | Extent of repeal |
|---|---|---|---|
| 28 Hen. 8. c. 7 (I) | Treason Act (Ireland) 1537 | The Treason Act (Ireland), 1537. | In section one, the words " after the first day of February next coming " and the words " after the said first day of February " wherever they occur. |
| 2 Eliz. 1. c. 1 (I) | Act of Supremacy (Ireland) 1560 | The Act of Supremacy (Ireland), 1560. | In section fifteen, the words from the beginning to " to the contrary notwithstanding ". |
| 10 & 11 Chas. 1. c. 11 (I) | Common Informers Act (Ireland) 1634 | The Common Informers Act (Ireland), 1634. | In section one, the words " after the end of this present session of Parliament ". |
| 7 Will. 3. c. 3 (I) | Settlement of Ireland Act 1695 | The Settlement of Ireland Act, 1695. | Section one. |
| 7 Will. 3. c. 12 (I) | Statute of Frauds (Ireland) 1695 | The Statute of Frauds (Ireland), 1695. | In section twenty, the words " that the prerogative court of the archbishop of Armagh, and other ecclesiastical courts, and other ". |
| 10 Will. 3. c. 10 (I) | Inquisitions Act (Ireland) 1698 | The Inquisitions Act (Ireland), 1698. | In section three, the words from " to any inquisition or office " to " ninety-eight, nor ". |
| 2 Anne c. 5 (I) | Treason Act (Ireland) 1703 | The Treason Act (Ireland), 1703. | In section one, the words from " from and after " to " seven hundred and three". |
| 6 Anne c. 8 (I) | Privilege of Parliament Act (Ireland) 1707 | The Privilege of Parliament Act (Ireland), 1707. | In the preamble, the words from " Whereas by a statute made " to " nor troubled by no mean ". |
| 2 Geo. 1. c. 20 (I) | Limitation Act (Ireland) 1715 | The Limitation Act (Ireland), 1715. | In section one, the words " after the twenty fourth day of June one thousand seven hundred and sixteen." In section three, the words " after the first day of July in the year one thousand seven hundred and sixteen "; the words " or informations "; " or information "; " exhibited " and " or exhibited ", wherever they occur, and the words " after the said first day of July ". |
| 6 Geo. 1. c. 5 (I) | Protestant Dissenters Relief Act (Ireland) 1719 | The Protestant Dissenters Relief Act (Ireland), 1719. | In section fourteen, the words " after the first day of January one thousand seven hundred and nineteen." Section sixteen. |
| 1 Geo. 2. c. 8 (I) | Privilege of Parliament Act (Ireland) 1727 | The Privilege of Parliament Act (Ireland), 1727. | In section one, the words " from and after the first day of May one thousand seven hundred and twenty eight ". |
| 11 Geo. 2. c. 5 (I) | Privilege of Parliament Act (Ireland) 1737 | The Privilege of Parliament Act (Ireland), 1737. | Section three, so far as unrepealed. |
| 1 Geo. 3. c. 9 (I) | Gold and Silver Thread Act (Ireland) 1761 | The Gold and Silver Thread Act (Ireland), 1761. | Section nine. |
| 3 Geo. 3. c. 16 (I) | Charitable Uses Act (Ireland) 1763 | The Charitable Uses Act (Ireland), 1763. | Section fifteen. |
| 21 & 22 Geo. 3. c. 11 (I) | Habeas Corpus Act (Ireland) 1781 | The Habeas Corpus Act (Ireland), 1781. | Section thirteen. |
| 21 & 22 Geo. 3. c. 16 (I) | Bank of Ireland Act (Ireland) 1781 | The Bank of Ireland Act (Ireland), 1781. | In section four, the words " before the first day of January one thousand seven hundred and eighty four ". Section five. Section twenty. In section twenty-one, the words from " then, and in such case " to " or request, or ". |
| 21 & 22 Geo. 3. c. 20 (I) | Crown Debts (Ireland) Act 1781 | The Crown Debts (Ireland) Act, 1781. | In section twenty-three, the words " customer, collector or receiver " and the words " by him collected or received,". |
| 27 Geo. 3. c. 35 (I) | Game Act (Ireland) 1787 | The Game Act (Ireland), 1787. | Section twenty four. |
| 33 Geo. 3. c. 18 (I) | Lotteries Act (Ireland) 1793 | The Lotteries Act (Ireland), 1793. | In section twenty-seven, the words from " and that if any person or persons shall be sued " to the end of the section. |
| 33 Geo. 3. c. 21 (I) | Roman Catholic Relief Act 1793 | An Act for the Relief of His Majesty's Popish or Roman Catholic Subjects of Ireland. | The whole act, so far as unrepealed. |
| 33 Geo. 3. c. 34 (I) | Civil List Act (Ireland) 1793 | The Civil List Act (Ireland), 1793. | The whole act, so far as unrepealed, except section fifteen. |
| 35 Geo. 3. c. 28 (I) | Collection of Revenue Act (Ireland) 1795 | The Collection of Revenue Act (Ireland), 1795. | Sections five, six and eight. In section eleven, the words " the receiver general of ". In section twenty-three, the words " by any receiver general, or ". In section twenty-five, the words " or any receiver general of any duties payable to His Majesty ", and the words " receiver general " occurring before " collector, or distributor ". |
| 35 Geo. 3. c. 29 (I) | Representation of the People Act (Ireland) 1795 | The Representation of the People Act (Ireland), 1795. | Section seventy-six. |
| 36 Geo. 3. c. 31 (I) | Treason by Women Act (Ireland) 1796 | The Treason by Women Act (Ireland), 1796. | Section four, so far as unrepealed. |
| 38 Geo. 3. c. 2 (I) | Quo Warranto Act (Ireland) 1798 | The Quo Warranto Act (Ireland), 1798. | In section one, the words from " after the first day " to " ninety-eight ". |
| 40 Geo. 3. c. 29 (I) | Parliamentary Representation Act (Ireland) 1800 | The Parliamentary Representation Act (Ireland), 1800. | In the preamble, the words " four lords spiritual of Ireland by rotation of sessions, and "; and the words from " and one hundred commoners " to " the parliament of the united kingdom ". Section two. In section three, the word " said " where each time occurring, and the words from " and that all " to " serve in parliament; ". In section seven, the words " specified in this Act " and " according to the number hereinbefore set forth ". |
| 40 Geo. 3. c. 38 (I) | Act of Union (Ireland) 1800 | The Act of Union (Ireland), 1800. | In section one, in article four, in paragraph one, the words " four lords spiritual of Ireland, by rotation of sessions, and "; and from " and one hundred commoners " to the end of the paragraph; in paragraph three the words " spiritual or "; in paragraph nine the words " spiritual and " where occurring for the first and last time; in paragraph eleven, the words from " and that all lords spiritual " to " trial of peers excepted "; in article five, the words from " the churches of England and Ireland " to " in like manner " ; and article seven. In section two, the words " four lords spiritual of Ireland by rotation of sessions, and "; from " and one hundred commoners " to " as is hereinafter provided: that ". Section three. In section four the word " said " where each time occurring, and from " and that all the other towns," to " representatives to serve in Parliament " and " other than the aforesaid " where next occurring thereafter. In section five, the words from " the primate of all Ireland " to " for the first session thereof ". Sections six and seven. In section eight the words " specified in this Act " and the words " according to the number herein before set forth ". In section nine, the words from " provided always " to the end of the section. |

==== Third schedule: Church Assembly Measures ====
Third schedule — Church Assembly Measures
| Citation | Short title | Extent of repeal |
|---|---|---|
| 3 & 4 Geo. 6. No. 2 | Benefice Buildings (Postponement of Inspections and Repayment of Loans) Measure 1940 | The whole measure. |
| 8 & 9 Geo. 6. No. 1 | Emergency Legislation Measure 1944 | Section seven. |

== Subsequent developments ==
The entry relating to the Agricultural Development Act 1939 (2 & 3 Geo. 6. c. 48) in the fourth schedule to the act was repealed by section 36(1)(a) of, and part I of the schedule to, the Agriculture Act 1957 (5 & 6 Eliz. 2. c. 57), which came into force on 1 September 1957.

The words "to the court of the county palatine of Lancaster or" in section 2 of the act were repealed by section 56(4) of, and part II of schedule 11 to, the Courts Act 1971, which came into force on 1 January 1972.

Section 4(1) of the act was repealed by section 41(1) of, and part 1 of schedule 6 to, the Northern Ireland Constitution Act 1973, which came into force on 18 July 1973.

The first, second and third schedules to, and the entry relating to section 22 of the Naval Volunteers Act 1853 (16 & 17 Vict. c. 73) in the fourth schedule to, the act were repealed by section 1 of, and part XI of the schedule to, the Statute Law (Repeals) Act 1974, which came into force on 27 June 1974.

Section 2 of the act was repealed by section 32(4) of, and part V of schedule 5 to, the Administration of Justice Act 1977, which came into force on 29 July 1977.

The enactments which were repealed (whether for the whole or any part of the United Kingdom) by the act were repealed so far as they extended to the Isle of Man by section 1(1) of, and schedule 1 to, the Statute Law Revision (Isle of Man) Act 1991, which came into force on 25 July 1991.

Section 1 of the act was repealed by section 1(1) of, and group 1 of part IX of schedule 1 to, the Statute Law (Repeals) Act 1998, which came into force on 19 November 1998.

== See also ==
- Statute Law Revision Act

== Bibliography ==
- Halsbury's Statutes,
- HL Deb vol 184, cols 202 to 204 and 861 to 862, HC Deb vol 521, col 2193.
