= Livestock Industry Act 1937 =

Act of the Parliament of the United Kingdom

Livestock Industry Act 1937 (Note: Section 59(1).)
- Act of Parliament
- Parliament of the United Kingdom
- Long title: An Act to make provision for the development and better organisation of the livestock industry and industries connected therewith; for paying a subsidy to producers of fat cattle; for regulating the importation of livestock and meat, the holding of livestock markets and the slaughtering of livestock; and for purposes connected with the matters aforesaid.
- Citation: 1 Edw. 8. & 1 Geo. 6. c. 50
- Territorial extent: United Kingdom (Note: Section 59(2).)

Dates
- Royal assent: 20 July 1937
- Commencement: 20 July 1937 (Note: The Acts of Parliament (Commencement) Act 1793.)
- Repealed: 1 September 1957
Other legislation
Amended by	Statute Law Revision Act 1953
Repealed by	Agriculture Act 1957

Status: Repealed

Text of statute as originally enacted

The Livestock Industry Act 1937 (1 Edw. 8. & 1 Geo. 6. c. 50) was an act of the Parliament of the United Kingdom on 20 July of that year. The act was part of a proposal intended to stabilise domestic production and beef prices through quota regulation of foreign beef importation. The act imposed a subsidy measure through tariffs levied on foreign beef, which favoured Australian and New Zealand producers.

== Subsequent developments ==
The whole act was repealed by section 36(1) of, and part I of the fourth schedule to, the Agriculture Act 1957 (5 & 6 Eliz. 2. c. 57), which came into force on 1 September 1957.
