= Safeguarding of Industries Act 1921 =

Act of the Parliament of the United Kingdom

Safeguarding of Industries Act 1921 (Note: Section 15.)
- Act of Parliament
- Parliament of the United Kingdom
- Long title: An Act to impose duties of customs on certain goods with a view to the safeguarding of certain special industries and the safeguarding of employment in industries in the United Kingdom against the effects of the depreciation of foreign currencies, and the disposal of imported goods at prices below the cost of production, and for purposes connected therewith.
- Citation: 11 & 12 Geo. 5. c. 47
- Territorial extent: United Kingdom (Note: Section 14(2).)

Dates
- Royal assent: 19 August 1921
- Commencement: 19 August 1921 (except part I); 1 October 1921(part I); (Note: Section 16.)
- Expired: 1 October 1926(part I)
- Repealed: 20 February 1958
Other legislation
| Amended by | Customs and Excise Act 1952; Statute Law Revision Act 1953 |
| Repealed by | Import Duties Act 1958 |

Status: Repealed

Text of statute as originally enacted

The Safeguarding of Industries Act 1921 (11 & 12 Geo. 5. c. 47) was an act of the Parliament of the United Kingdom which safeguarded certain key industries.

Part I of the act put a five-year duty of 33.3% ad valorem on nine categories of items (including optical glass, laboratory porcelain, hosiery latch needles, metallic tungsten, synthetic chemicals) that were perceived as being essential to British success in the Great War. Part II of the Act put a similar duty on imported goods which were sold at prices below the cost of production (dumping) or at prices lower than the prices of similar goods profitably made in Britain, due to depreciating currencies of the imported goods' country of origin. In the House of Commons 142 voted for its third reading, which was passed by 178 votes to 56.

== Subsequent developments ==
In section 14, the definition of " prescribed " was repealed by section 1 of, and the first schedule to, the Statute Law Revision Act 1953 (2 & 3 Eliz. 2. c. 5), which came into force on 18 December 1953.
