= Coal Mines (Emergency) Act 1920 =

Act of the Parliament of the United Kingdom

Coal Mines (Emergency) Act 1920 (Note: Section 11(1).)
- Act of Parliament
- Parliament of the United Kingdom
- Long title: An Act to make temporary provision on account of the emergency arising from the war as to the profits and control of, wages in, and advances in respect of, colliery undertakings, and for purposes connected therewith.
- Citation: 10 & 11 Geo. 5. c. 4
- Territorial extent: United Kingdom

Dates
- Royal assent: 31 March 1920
- Commencement: 1 April 1919 (Note: Section 11(2).)
- Expired: 31 August 1919
- Repealed: 18 December 1953
Other legislation
| Repeals/revokes | Coal Mines Control Agreement (Confirmation) Act 1918 |
| Repealed by | Statute Law Revision Act 1927; Statute Law Revision Act 1953 |

Status: Repealed

Text of statute as originally enacted

The Coal Mines (Emergency) Act 1920 (10 & 11 Geo. 5. c. 4) was an act of the Parliament of the United Kingdom. It became law on 31 March 1920.

It required that the profits of undertakings in the United Kingdom which operated coal mines, during the duration of the Act, were to be aggregated and distributed among the undertakings as provided in Schedule I of the Act. Assets employed in mining were not to be removed, nor profits distributed, without the consent of the Coal Controller. The controller was permitted to make cash advances to enable the output of a mine to be maintained. Contravention of the Act, or of related orders by the Board of Trade, constituted an offence, incurring a fine of £100 plus £10 per day the offence continued.

Subject to schedule II, the agreement confirmed by the Coal Mines Control Agreement (Confirmation) Act 1918 (7 & 8 Geo. 5. c. 56) was to cease from 1 April 1919 and that Act was to be repealed. The Act was to be considered as commencing from 1 April 1919 and remaining in force until 31 August 1920, when the new legislation took effect.

== Subsequent developments ==
The whole act, so far as unrepealed, was repealed by section 1 of, and the first schedule to, the Statute Law Revision Act 1953 (2 & 3 Eliz. 2. c. 5), which came into force on 18 December 1953.

== Bibliography ==
- Oliver & Boyd's new Edinburgh almanac and national repository for the year 1921. p. 220
