= List of acts of the Parliament of the United Kingdom from 1907 =

This is a complete list of acts of the Parliament of the United Kingdom for the year 1907.

Note that the first parliament of the United Kingdom was held in 1801; parliaments between 1707 and 1800 were either parliaments of Great Britain or of Ireland). For acts passed up until 1707, see the list of acts of the Parliament of England and the list of acts of the Parliament of Scotland. For acts passed from 1707 to 1800, see the list of acts of the Parliament of Great Britain. See also the list of acts of the Parliament of Ireland.

For acts of the devolved parliaments and assemblies in the United Kingdom, see the list of acts of the Scottish Parliament, the list of acts of the Northern Ireland Assembly, and the list of acts and measures of Senedd Cymru; see also the list of acts of the Parliament of Northern Ireland.

The number shown after each act's title is its chapter number. Acts passed before 1963 are cited using this number, preceded by the year(s) of the reign during which the relevant parliamentary session was held; thus the Union with Ireland Act 1800 is cited as "39 & 40 Geo. 3 c. 67", meaning the 67th act passed during the session that started in the 39th year of the reign of George III and which finished in the 40th year of that reign. Note that the modern convention is to use Arabic numerals in citations (thus "41 Geo. 3" rather than "41 Geo. III"). Acts of the last session of the Parliament of Great Britain and the first session of the Parliament of the United Kingdom are both cited as "41 Geo. 3". Acts passed from 1963 onwards are simply cited by calendar year and chapter number.

== 7 Edw. 7 ==
The second session of the 28th Parliament of the United Kingdom, which met from 12 February 1907 until 28 August 1907.

This session was also traditionally cited as 7 Ed. 7 or 7 E. 7.

=== Public general acts ===
Short title	Citation	Royal assent
Long title
Consolidated Fund (No. 1) Act 1907 (repealed)	7 Edw. 7. c. 1	22 March 1907
An Act to apply certain sums out of the Consolidated Fund to the service of the years ending on the thirty-first day of March one thousand nine hundred and seven and one thousand nine hundred and eight. (Repealed by Statute Law Revision Act 1927 (17 & 18 Geo. 5. c. 42))
Army (Annual) Act 1907 (repealed)	7 Edw. 7. c. 2	29 April 1907
An Act to provide, during Twelve Months, for the Discipline and Regulation of the Army. (Repealed by Army and Air Force (Annual) Act 1921 (11 & 12 Geo. 5. c. 9), Statute Law Revision Act 1927 (17 & 18 Geo. 5. c. 42), Statute Law Revision Act 1953 (2 & 3 Eliz. 2. c. 5) and Revision of the Army and Air Force Acts (Transitional Provisions) Act 1955 (3 & 4 Eliz. 2. c. 20))
Irish Tobacco Act 1907 (repealed)	7 Edw. 7. c. 3	4 July 1907
An Act to repeal the Law which prohibits the Growing of Tobacco in Ireland. (Repealed by Finance Act 1908 (8 Edw. 7. c. 16))
Destructive Insects and Pests Act 1907 (repealed)	7 Edw. 7. c. 4	4 July 1907
An Act to extend the Destructive Insects Act, 1877, (Note: Destructive Insects Act 1877 (40 & 41 Vict. c. 68)) to all Pests destructive to Crops, Trees, or Bushes. (Repealed for England and Wales and Scotland by Plant Health Act 1967 (c. 8) and for Northern Ireland by Plant Health Act (Northern Ireland) 1967 (c. 28 (N.I.)))
Injured Animals Act 1907 (repealed)	7 Edw. 7. c. 5	26 July 1907
An Act to re-enact with amendments the Injured Animals Act, 1894. (Note: Injured Animals Act 1894 (57 & 58 Vict. c. 22)) (Repealed for England and Wales and Ireland by Protection of Animals Act 1911 (1 & 2 Geo. 5. c. 27) and for Scotland by Protection of Animals (Scotland) Act 1912 (2 & 3 Geo. 5. c. 14))
Telegraph (Money) Act 1907 (repealed)	7 Edw. 7. c. 6	2 August 1907
An Act to provide for raising further Money for the purpose of the Telegraph Acts, 1863 to 1906. (Repealed by Statute Law Revision Act 1927 (17 & 18 Geo. 5. c. 42))
Australian States Constitution Act 1907 (repealed)	7 Edw. 7. c. 7	2 August 1907
An Act to amend the Law relating to the Reservation for His Majesty's pleasure of Bills passed by the Legislatures of the States forming part of the Commonwealth of Australia, and to confirm certain Acts passed by those Legislatures. (Repealed by Statute Law (Repeals) Act 1989 (c. 43))
Assay of Imported Watch-Cases (Existing Stocks Exemption) Act 1907 (repealed)	7 Edw. 7. c. 8	2 August 1907
An Act to exempt from Assay Foreign Watch-Cases imported into the United Kingdom before the first day of June nineteen hundred and seven. (Repealed by Hallmarking Act 1973 (c. 43))
Territorial and Reserve Forces Act 1907 (repealed)	7 Edw. 7. c. 9	2 August 1907
An Act to provide for the reorganisation of His Majesty's Military Forces and for that purpose to authorise the establishment of County Associations, and the raising and maintenance of a Territorial Force, and for amending the Acts relating to the Reserve Forces. (Repealed by Statute Law Revision Act 1966 (c. 5))
Employment of Women Act 1907 (repealed)	7 Edw. 7. c. 10	9 August 1907
An Act to repeal section fifty-seven of the Factory and Workshop Act, 1901, (Note: Factory and Workshop Act 1901 (1 Edw. 7. c. 22)) and part of section seven of the Coal Mines Regulation Act, 1887, relating to the Employment of Women and Children. (Repealed by Statute Law Revision Act 1927 (17 & 18 Geo. 5. c. 42))
British North America Act 1907 known in Canada as the Constitution Act, 1907	7 Edw. 7. c. 11	9 August 1907
An Act to make further provision with respect to the sums to be paid by Canada to the several Provinces of the Dominion.
Matrimonial Causes Act 1907 (repealed)	7 Edw. 7. c. 12	9 August 1907
An Act to amend the Matrimonial Causes Acts, 1857 (Note: Matrimonial Causes Act 1857 (20 & 21 Vict. c. 85)) and 1866, (Note: Matrimonial Causes Act 1866 (29 & 30 Vict. c. 32)) by extending the powers of the Court in relation -to Maintenance and Alimony, and leave to intervene. (Repealed by Supreme Court of Judicature (Consolidation) Act 1925 (15 & 16 Geo. 5. c. 49))
Finance Act 1907	7 Edw. 7. c. 13	9 August 1907
An Act to grant certain duties of Customs and Inland Revenue, to alter other duties, and to amend the Law relating to Customs and Inland Revenue and the National Debt, and to make other provisions for the financial arrangements of the year.
Released Persons (Poor Law Relief) Act 1907 (repealed)	7 Edw. 7. c. 14	21 August 1907
An Act to make better provision as to the Relief of Persons released from detention in Prisons, Reformatory and Industrial Schools, and Inebriate Reformatories. (Repealed by Poor Law Act 1927 (17 & 18 Geo. 5. c. 14))
Salmon and Freshwater Fisheries Act 1907 (repealed)	7 Edw. 7. c. 15	21 August 1907
An Act to enable Provisional Orders to be made for regulating Salmon and Freshwater Fisheries. (Repealed by Salmon and Freshwater Fisheries Act 1923 (13 & 14 Geo. 5. c. 16))
Evidence (Colonial Statutes) Act 1907	7 Edw. 7. c. 16	21 August 1907
An Act to facilitate the admission in evidence of statutes passed by the Legislatures of British possessions and protectorates, including Cyprus.
Probation of Offenders Act 1907 (repealed)	7 Edw. 7. c. 17	21 August 1907
An Act to permit the Release on Probation of Offenders in certain cases, and for other matters incidental thereto. (Repealed for England and Wales by Criminal Justice Act 1948 (11 & 12 Geo. 6. c. 58), for Scotland by Criminal Justice (Scotland) Act 1949 (12, 13 & 14 Geo. 6. c. 94) and for Northern Ireland by Probation Act (Northern Ireland) 1950 (c. 7 (N.I.)))
Married Women's Property Act 1907	7 Edw. 7. c. 18	21 August 1907
An Act to amend the Married Women's Property Act, 1882. (Note: Married Women's Property Act 1882 (45 & 46 Vict. c. 75))
Prisons (Ireland) Act 1907 (repealed)	7 Edw. 7. c. 19	21 August 1907
An Act to enable portion of a term of imprisonment in Ireland to be remitted as a reward for good conduct. (Repealed by Statute Law Revision Act 1927 (17 & 18 Geo. 5. c. 42) and Prison Act (Northern Ireland) 1953 (c. 18 (N.I.)))
Appropriation Act 1907 (repealed)	7 Edw. 7. c. 20	21 August 1907
An Act to apply a sum out of the Consolidated Fund to the service of the year ending on the thirty-first day of March one thousand nine hundred and eight, and to appropriate the Supplies granted in this Session of Parliament. (Repealed by Statute Law Revision Act 1927 (17 & 18 Geo. 5. c. 42))
Butter and Margarine Act 1907 (repealed)	7 Edw. 7. c. 21	21 August 1907
An Act to make further provision with respect to the Manufacture, Importation, and Sale of Butter and Margarine and similar Substances. (Repealed for England and Wales and Scotland by Food and Drugs (Adulteration) Act 1928 (18 & 19 Geo. 5. c. 31) and for Northern Ireland by Food and Drugs Act (Northern Ireland) 1958 (c. 27 (N.I.)))
Petty Sessions Clerk (Ireland) Amendment Act 1907 (repealed)	7 Edw. 7. c. 22	21 August 1907
An Act to amend the Law relating to Clerks of Petty Sessions in Ireland. (Repealed by Administration of Justice Act (Northern Ireland) 1954 (c. 9 (N.I.)))
Criminal Appeal Act 1907 (repealed)	7 Edw. 7. c. 23	28 August 1907
An Act to establish a Court of Criminal Appeal and to amend the Law relating to Appeals in Criminal Cases. (Repealed by Criminal Appeal Act 1968 (c. 19))
Limited Partnerships Act 1907	7 Edw. 7. c. 24	28 August 1907
An Act to establish Limited Partnerships.
Commissioners for Oaths (Prize Proceedings) Act 1907 (repealed)	7 Edw. 7. c. 25	28 August 1907
An Act for amending the Law relating to the Administration of Oaths for the purpose of Proceedings in Prize Courts. (Repealed by Evidence and Powers of Attorney Act 1940 (3 & 4 Geo. 6. c. 28))
Isle of Man (Customs) Act 1907 (repealed)	7 Edw. 7. c. 26	28 August 1907
An Act to amend the Law with respect to Customs Duties in the Isle of Man. (Repealed by Statute Law Revision Act 1927 (17 & 18 Geo. 5. c. 42))
Advertisements Regulation Act 1907 (repealed)	7 Edw. 7. c. 27	28 August 1907
An Act to authorise Local Authorities to make Byelaws respecting the Exhibition of Advertisements. (Repealed for England and Wales by Town and Country Planning Act 1947 (10 & 11 Geo. 6. c. 51), for Scotland by Town and Country Planning (Scotland) Act 1947 (10 & 11 Geo. 6. c. 53) and for Northern Ireland by Advertisements Regulation Act (Northern Ireland) 1937 (1 Edw. 8 & 1 Geo. 6. c. 10 (N.I.)))
Patents and Designs (Amendment) Act 1907 (repealed)	7 Edw. 7. c. 28	28 August 1907
An Act to amend the Law relating to Patents and Designs. (Repealed by Patents and Designs Act 1907 (7 Edw. 7. c. 29))
Patents and Designs Act 1907	7 Edw. 7. c. 29	28 August 1907
An Act to consolidate the enactments relating to Patents for Inventions and the Registration of Designs and certain enactments relating to Trade Marks.
Public Health (Scotland) Amendment Act 1907 (repealed)	7 Edw. 7. c. 30	28 August 1907
An Act to amend sections fifty-seven, fifty-eight, and fifty-nine of the Public Health (Scotland) Act, 1897, (Note: Public Health (Scotland) Act 1897 (60 & 61 Vict. c. 38)) relating to the prevention of infectious diseases. (Repealed by Public Health etc. (Scotland) Act 2008 (asp 5))
Vaccination Act 1907 (repealed)	7 Edw. 7. c. 31	28 August 1907
An Act to substitute a Statutory Declaration for the Certificate required under section two of the Vaccination Act, 1898, (Note: Vaccination Act 1898 (61 & 62 Vict. c. 49)) of Conscientious Objection. (Repealed by Statute Law Revision Act 1927 (17 & 18 Geo. 5. c. 42) and National Health Service Act 1946 (9 & 10 Geo. 6. c. 81))
Public Health (Regulations as to Food) Act 1907 (repealed)	7 Edw. 7. c. 32	28 August 1907
An Act to enable regulations to be made for the prevention of danger arising to public health from the importation, preparation, storage, and distribution of articles of food. (Repealed for England and Wales by Food and Drugs Act 1938 (1 & 2 Geo. 6. c. 56) and Food and Drugs Amendment Act 1954 (2 & 3 Eliz. 2. c. 67), for Scotland by Food and Drugs (Scotland) Act 1956 (4 & 5 Eliz. 2. c. 30) and for Northern Ireland by Food and Drugs Act (Northern Ireland) 1958 (c. 27 (N.I.)))
Qualification of Women (County and Borough Councils) Act 1907 (repealed)	7 Edw. 7. c. 33	28 August 1907
An Act to amend the Law relating to the capacity of Women to be elected and act as Members of County or Borough Councils. (Repealed by Local Government Act 1933 (23 & 24 Geo. 5. c. 51) and London Government Act 1939 (2 & 3 Geo. 6. c. 40))
Expiring Laws Continuance Act 1907 (repealed)	7 Edw. 7. c. 34	28 August 1907
An Act to continue various Expiring Laws. (Repealed by Statute Law Revision Act 1927 (17 & 18 Geo. 5. c. 42))
Council of India Act 1907 (repealed)	7 Edw. 7. c. 35	28 August 1907
An Act to amend the Law as to the Council of India. (Repealed by Government of India Act 1915 (5 & 6 Geo. 5. c. 61))
Public Works Loans Act 1907 (repealed)	7 Edw. 7. c. 36	28 August 1907
An Act to grant Money for the purpose of certain Local Loans out of the Local Loans Fund, and for other purposes relating to Local Loans. (Repealed by National Loans Act 1968 (c. 13))
Transvaal Loan (Guarantee) Act 1907 (repealed)	7 Edw. 7. c. 37	28 August 1907
An Act to authorise the Treasury to guarantee the payment of a Loan to be raised by the Colony of the Transvaal. (Repealed by Statute Law Revision Act 1959 (7 & 8 Eliz. 2. c. 68))
Irish Land Act 1907	7 Edw. 7. c. 38	28 August 1907
An Act to make provision with respect to the Disposal of Mining Rights under section thirteen of the Irish Land Act, 1903, (Note: Irish Land Act 1903 (3 Edw. 7. c. 37)) and to amend section fifty-four of that Act.
Factory and Workshop Act 1907 (repealed)	7 Edw. 7. c. 39	28 August 1907
An Act to amend the Factory and Workshop Act, 1901, (Note: Factory and Workshop Act 1901 (1 Edw. 7. c. 22)) with respect to Laundries, and to extend that Act to certain Institutions and to provide for the inspection of certain premises. (Repealed for England and Wales and Scotland by Factories Act 1937 (1 Edw. 8 & 1 Geo. 6. c. 67) and for Northern Ireland by Factories Act (Northern Ireland) 1938 (2 Geo. 6. c. 23 (N.I.)))
Notification of Births Act 1907	7 Edw. 7. c. 40	28 August 1907
An Act to provide for the early Notification of Births. (Repealed for England and Wales by Public Health Act 1936 (26 Geo. 5 & 1 Edw. 8. c. 49) and London Government Order 1970 (SI 1970/211))
Whale Fisheries (Scotland) Act 1907 (repealed)	7 Edw. 7. c. 41	28 August 1907
An Act to regulate Whale Fisheries in Scotland. (Repealed by Fisheries Act 1981 (c. 29))
Sea Fisheries (Scotland) Application of Penalties Act 1907 (repealed)	7 Edw. 7. c. 42	28 August 1907
An Act to provide for the payment to the Fishery Board for Scotland of the penalties or other moneys recovered in respect of illegal sea fishing in Scotland. (Repealed by Inshore Fishing (Scotland) Act 1984 (c. 26))
Education (Administrative Provisions) Act 1907 (repealed)	7 Edw. 7. c. 43	28 August 1907
An Act to make provision for the better administration by the Central and Local Authorities in England and Wales of the enactments relating to Education. (Repealed by Statute Law (Repeals) Act 1978 (c. 45))
Supreme Court of Judicature (Ireland) Act 1907 (repealed)	7 Edw. 7. c. 44	28 August 1907
An Act to provide for the Abolition of two Judgeships of the High Court in Ireland, and to reduce the Salary of the Lord Chancellor of Ireland, and for other purposes connected therewith. (Repealed by Statute Law Revision Act 1927 (17 & 18 Geo. 5. c. 42))
Lights on Vehicles Act 1907 (repealed)	7 Edw. 7. c. 45	28 August 1907
An Act to render compulsory the carrying of Lights by Vehicles at Night. (Repealed for England and Wales by Road Transport Lighting Act 1927 (17 & 18 Geo. 5. c. 37) and for Northern Ireland by Motor Vehicles and Road Traffic Act (Northern Ireland) 1934 (24 & 25 Geo. 5. c. 15 (N.I.)))
Employers' Liability Insurance Companies Act 1907 (repealed)	7 Edw. 7. c. 46	28 August 1907
An Act to apply the provisions of the Life Assurance Companies Acts, 1870 to 1872, to companies carrying on the business of insuring Employers against liability to pay compensation or damages to workmen in their Employment. (Repealed by Assurance Companies Act 1909 (9 Edw. 7. c. 49))
Deceased Wife's Sister's Marriage Act 1907 (repealed)	7 Edw. 7. c. 47	28 August 1907
An Act to amend the Law relating to Marriage with a Deceased Wife's Sister. (Repealed for England and Wales by Marriage Act 1949 (12, 13 & 14 Geo. 6. c. 76), for Scotland by Marriage (Enabling) Act 1960 (8 & 9 Eliz. 2. c. 29) and for Northern Ireland by Family Law (Miscellaneous Provisions) (Northern Ireland) Order 1984 (SI 1984/1984 (N.I. 14)))
Qualification of Women (County and Town Councils) (Scotland) Act 1907 (repealed)	7 Edw. 7. c. 48	28 August 1907
An Act to amend the Law relating to the capacity of Women to be elected and act as Members of County or Town Councils in Scotland. (Repealed by Sex Disqualification (Removal) Act 1919 (9 & 10 Geo. 5. c. 71), Statute Law Revision Act 1927 (17 & 18 Geo. 5. c. 42) and Local Government (Scotland) Act 1947 (10 & 11 Geo. 6. c. 43))
Vaccination (Scotland) Act 1907 (repealed)	7 Edw. 7. c. 49	28 August 1907
An Act to amend the Law with respect to Vaccination in Scotland by authorising a statutory declaration of conscientious objection. (Repealed by National Health Service (Scotland) Act 1947 (10 & 11 Geo. 6. c. 27))
Companies Act 1907 (repealed)	7 Edw. 7. c. 50	28 August 1907
An Act to amend the Companies Acts, 1862 to 1900. (Repealed by Companies (Consolidation) Act 1908 (8 Edw. 7. c. 69))
Sheriff Courts (Scotland) Act 1907	7 Edw. 7. c. 51	28 August 1907
An Act to regulate and amend the Laws and practice relating to the civil procedure in Sheriff Courts in Scotland, and for other purposes.
Merchant Shipping Act 1907 (repealed)	7 Edw. 7. c. 52	28 August 1907
An Act to amend section seventy-eight of the Merchant Shipping Act, 1894, (Note: Merchant Shipping Act 1894 (57 & 58 Vict. c. 60)) with respect to the deduction of the space occupied by propelling power in ascertaining the tonnage of a ship. (Repealed by Merchant Shipping Act 1965 (c. 47))
Public Health Acts Amendment Act 1907	7 Edw. 7. c. 53	28 August 1907
An Act to amend the Public Health Acts.
Small Holdings and Allotments Act 1907 (repealed)	7 Edw. 7. c. 54	28 August 1907
An Act to amend the Law with respect to Small Holdings and Allotments. (Repealed by Small Holdings and Allotments Act 1908 (8 Edw. 7. c. 36))
London Cab and Stage Carriage Act 1907	7 Edw. 7. c. 55	28 August 1907
An Act to amend the law relating to cabs and stage carriages in London.
Evicted Tenants (Ireland) Act 1907	7 Edw. 7. c. 56	28 August 1907
An Act to facilitate the provision of Land for certain Evicted Tenants in Ireland and for other purposes connected therewith, and to make provision with respect to the tenure of office by the Estates Commissioners.

=== Local acts ===
Short title	Citation	Royal assent
Long title
Portobello and Musselburgh Tramways (Port Seton Deviation) Order Confirmation Act 1907	7 Edw. 7. c. i	29 April 1907
An Act to confirm a Provisional Order under the Private Legislation Procedure (Scotland) Act 1899 (Note: Private Legislation Procedure (Scotland) Act 1899 (62 & 63 Vict. c. 47)) relating to Portobello and Musselburgh Tramways (Port Seton Deviation).
	Portobello and Musselburgh Tramways (Port Seton Deviation) Order 1907	
Royal Insurance Company Act 1907	7 Edw. 7. c. ii	29 April 1907
An Act to make provision with reference to the substitution of a memorandum and articles of association for the existing constitution and regulations of the Royal Insurance Company, and for extending its objects; and to repeal, in part, the Royal Insurance Company's Act, 1891, (Note: Royal Insurance Company's Act 1891 (54 & 55 Vict. c. lxxxi)) and for other purposes.
West Riding Tramways Act 1907	7 Edw. 7. c. iii	4 July 1907
An Act to extend the time for the compulsory purchase of lands for and completion of tramways and other works authorised by the West Riding Tramways Act 1904. (Note: West Riding Tramways Act 1904 (4 Edw. 7. c. ccxiv))
Medway Lower Navigation Act 1907	7 Edw. 7. c. iv	4 July 1907
An Act to extend the jurisdiction of the Company of Proprietors of the Lower Navigation of the River Medway and for other purposes.
Gas Companies (Removal of Sulphur Restrictions) Act 1907	7 Edw. 7. c. v	4 July 1907
An Act to remove the restrictions in respect of sulphur compounds (other than sulphuretted hydrogen) now imposed upon certain gas companies.
Basingstoke Gas Act 1907	7 Edw. 7. c. vi	4 July 1907
An Act for conferring further powers upon the Basingstoke Gas Company.
Falmouth Gas Act 1907	7 Edw. 7. c. vii	4 July 1907
An Act for conferring further powers upon the Falmouth Gas Company.
Staveley Coal and Iron Company Act 1907	7 Edw. 7. c. viii	4 July 1907
An Act to rearrange and increase the capital of and to alter and extend the memorandum of association and the objects and powers of the Staveley Coal and Iron Company Limited and for other purposes.
Weston-super-Mare Grand Pier Act 1907	7 Edw. 7. c. ix	4 July 1907
An Act to extend the time for the completion of the authorised pier and works of the Weston-super-Mare Grand Pier Company and for other purposes.
North East London Railway Act 1907 (repealed)	7 Edw. 7. c. x	4 July 1907
An Act for conferring further powers upon the North East London Railway Company with respect to their undertaking, for authorising agreements with the Great Eastern, the North London, the London and South Western, the Midland, the City and South London, the Central London, the Metropolitan District, and the Metropolitan Railway Companies, and for other purposes. (Repealed by Statute Law (Repeals) Act 2013 (c. 2))
London and North Western Railway (Superannuation Fund) Act 1907	7 Edw. 7. c. xi	4 July 1907
An Act to amend the provisions of the London and North Western Railway Act 1854 (Note: London and North Western Railway Act 1854 (17 & 18 Vict. c. cci)) with respect to Superannuation Fund.
Plymouth and North Devon Direct Railway (Abandonment) Act 1907 (repealed)	7 Edw. 7. c. xii	4 July 1907
An Act for the abandonment of the Plymouth and North Devon Direct Railway. (Repealed by Statute Law (Repeals) Act 2013 (c. 2))
Borax Consolidated Limited Act 1907	7 Edw. 7. c. xiii	4 July 1907
An Act to provide for an increase of the share capital of Borax Consolidated Limited and for the conversion of the ordinary shares of the Company into preferred ordinary shares and deferred ordinary shares and for other purposes.
Folkestone, Sandgate and Hythe Tramways Act 1907	7 Edw. 7. c. xiv	4 July 1907
An Act to confer further powers on the Folkestone, Sandgate, and Hythe Tramways Company, for widening and altering roads and acquiring lands, and for other purposes.
Manchester Ship Canal (Bridgewater Canal) Act 1907	7 Edw. 7. c. xv	4 July 1907
An Act to authorise the working of mines minerals under and adjacent to the portion of the Bridgewater Canal extending from Monton Bridge, in the County of Lancaster, to Leigh, in the same county, and for other purposes.
West Yorkshire Tramways Act 1907	7 Edw. 7. c. xvi	4 July 1907
An Act to confer further powers on the West Yorkshire Tramways Company, for widening and altering roads and acquiring lands, and for other purposes.
Mitchum and Wimbledon Gas Act 1907 (repealed)	7 Edw. 7. c. xvii	4 July 1907
An Act to authorise the Mitcham and Wimbledon District Gaslight Company to construct new works to raise additional capital to convert their existing capital and for other purposes. (Repealed by Wandsworth, Wimbledon and Epsom District Gas Act 1912 (2 & 3 Geo. 5. c. xlvii))
Birmingham Corporation Act 1907 (repealed)	7 Edw. 7. c. xviii	4 July 1907
An Act to empower the Corporation of Birmingham to acquire further lands for the purposes of the Military Lands Acts 1892 to 1903 and for other purposes. (Repealed by West Midlands County Council Act 1980 (c. xi))
Newquay and District Water Act 1907	7 Edw. 7. c. xix	4 July 1907
An Act to confer further powers upon the Newquay and District Water Company; to extend their limits for the supply of water; to authorise the construction of works and the raising of money, and for other purposes.
Middlesbrough Corporation (Transporter Bridge) Act 1907 (repealed)	7 Edw. 7. c. xx	4 July 1907
An Act to authorise the mayor aldermen and burgesses of the county borough of Middlesbrough to construct a transporter bridge across the River Tees and to discontinue the Middlesbrough and Port Clarence Ferry and for other purposes. (Repealed by Middlesbrough Corporation Act 1933 (23 & 24 Geo. 5. c. lxxxiii))
Royal Bank of Scotland Act 1907 (repealed)	7 Edw. 7. c. xxi	4 July 1907
An Act to alter and enlarge the provisions of the Charters incorporating the Royal Bank of Scotland and of an Act amending the same. (Repealed by Royal Bank of Scotland Order Confirmation Act 1970 (c. iii))
Apothecaries Act 1907 (repealed)	7 Edw. 7. c. xxii	4 July 1907
An Act to vary the style or qualification of licentiates of the Society of Apothecaries of London and for other purposes. (Repealed by Statute Law (Repeals) Act 1989 (c. 43))
Maidstone Gas Act 1907	7 Edw. 7. c. xxiii	4 July 1907
An Act for extending the limits of supply of the Maidstone Gas Company and for other purposes.
Bristol Corporation Act 1907	7 Edw. 7. c. xxiv	4 July 1907
An Act to empower the lord mayor aldermen and burgesses of the city of Bristol to raise further moneys for completion of authorised dock works and for other purposes.
Burnley Corporation Act 1907	7 Edw. 7. c. xxv	4 July 1907
An Act to empower the mayor aldermen and burgesses of the county borough of Burnley to retain sell or otherwise dispose of surplus lands and for other purposes.
Tyne Improvement Act 1907	7 Edw. 7. c. xxvi	4 July 1907
An Act for conferring further powers on the Tyne Improvement Commissioners and for amending certain of the Tyne Improvement Acts 1850 to 1902 and for other purposes.
Keswick Urban District Council (Water) Act 1907	7 Edw. 7. c. xxvii	4 July 1907
An Act to define and sanction the existing water undertaking of the urban district council of Keswick in the county of Cumberland to authorise the construction of new works to define the limits for the supply of water and for other purposes.
Brecon and Merthyr Railway Act 1907	7 Edw. 7. c. xxviii	4 July 1907
An Act to authorise the Brecon and Merthyr Tydfil Junction Railway Company to acquire additional lands and to raise further money and for other purposes.
Port Talbot Railway and Docks Act 1907	7 Edw. 7. c. xxix	4 July 1907
An Act to enable the Port Talbot Railway and Docks Company to raise additional capital.
Manchester Ship Canal (Various Powers) Act 1907	7 Edw. 7. c. xxx	4 July 1907
An Act to empower the Manchester Ship Canal Company to acquire lands, and to confer upon that Company further powers in relation to the supply of water in their canal, and for other purposes
Shanklin Gas Act 1907	7 Edw. 7. c. xxxi	4 July 1907
An Act for incorporating and conferring powers on the Shanklin Gas Company and other purposes.
South Eastern and London, Chatham and Dover Railways Act 1907	7 Edw. 7. c. xxxii	4 July 1907
An Act to extend the time for the compulsory purchase of lands and for the completion of works for the South Eastern and London, Chatham, and Dover Railways, and to authorise the raising of additional capital by the South Eastern Railway Company, and for other purposes.
Metropolitan Railway (Pension Fund) Act 1907	7 Edw. 7. c. xxxiii	4 July 1907
An Act to authorise the Metropolitan Railway Company to establish and regulate a pension fund and for other purposes.
Simon-Carves Bye-Product Coke Oven Construction and Working Company Limited Act 1907	7 Edw. 7. c. xxxiv	4 July 1907
An Act to regulate and facilitate the increase of the capital of the Simon-Carves Bye-Product Coke Oven Construction and Working Company Limited and for other purposes.
Grays and Tilbury Gas Act 1907	7 Edw. 7. c. xxxv	4 July 1907
An Act for incorporating and conferring powers on the Grays and Tilbury Gas Company.
Brockenhurst Gas Act 1907	7 Edw. 7. c. xxxvi	4 July 1907
An Act to incorporate the Brockenhurst Gas Company and to enable that Company to supply with gas the parish of Brockenhurst in the county of Southampton.
Boston Spa Gas Act 1907	7 Edw. 7. c. xxxvii	4 July 1907
An Act to incorporate and confer powers upon the Boston Spa Gas Company.
Harrison's Patent Act 1907	7 Edw. 7. c. xxxviii	4 July 1907
An Act for rendering valid certain Letters Patent granted to Richard Harrison for an invention for improvements in or connected with elastic wheels applicable to motor and other vehicles.
St. Neot's Urban District Council Act 1907	7 Edw. 7. c. xxxix	4 July 1907
An Act to authorise the urban district council of St. Neot's to acquire the undertaking of the St. Neot's Water Company and to supply water throughout their district and the neighbourhood thereof and for other purposes.
Sutton Coldfield Rectory Act 1907	7 Edw. 7. c. xl	4 July 1907
An Act for transferring to the Ecclesiastical Commissioners the endowments of the rectory of Sutton Coldfield in the county of Warwick and for providing for the re-endowment of the said rectory and for the application of the income and capital of the transferred endowments and for other ecclesiastical purposes.
Birmingham Corporation Water Act 1907 (repealed)	7 Edw. 7. c. xli	4 July 1907
An Act for amending certain provisions of the Birmingham Corporation Water Acts in regard to repayment of moneys borrowed for the purposes of those Acts and for other purposes. (Repealed by West Midlands County Council Act 1980 (c. xi))
Great Yarmouth Port and Haven Act 1907	7 Edw. 7. c. xlii	4 July 1907
An Act to amend the Great Yarmouth Port and Haven Acts of 1866 (Note: Great Yarmouth Port and Haven Act 1866 (29 & 30 Vict. c. ccxlvii)) and 1900 (Note: Great Yarmouth Port and Haven Act 1900 (63 & 64 Vict. c. ciii)) to confer further powers upon the Great Yarmouth Port and Haven Commissioners and for other purposes.
Taff Valley Railway Act 1907	7 Edw. 7. c. xliii	4 July 1907
An Act to confer further powers on the Taff Vale Railway Company, and for other purposes.
General Accident Fire and Life Assurance Corporation Act 1907	7 Edw. 7. c. xliv	4 July 1907
An Act to empower the General Accident Fire and Life Assurance Corporation Limited to issue insurance coupons and for other purposes.
Ocean Accident and Guarantee Corporation Limited Act 1907	7 Edw. 7. c. xlv	4 July 1907
An Act to make provision with reference to claims by policy holders and other persons against other companies or persons for compensation or payment in respect of injuries.
London Government Scheme (Southwark Borough Market) Confirmation Act 1907	7 Edw. 7. c. xlvi	4 July 1907
An Act to confirm a Scheme made under the London Government Act 1899 (Note: London Government Act 1899 (62 & 63 Vict. c. 14)) relating to the Southwark Borough Market.
	Southwark (Borough Market) Scheme.	
Provisional Order (Marriages) Confirmation Act 1907 (repealed)	7 Edw. 7. c. xlvii	4 July 1907
An Act to confirm a Provisional Order made by one of His Majesty's Principal Secretaries of State under the Provisional Order (Marriages) Act, 1905. (Note: Provisional Order (Marriages) Act 1905 (5 Edw. 7. c. 23)) (Repealed by Statute Law (Repeals) Act 1977 (c. 18))
Metropolitan Police Provisional Order Confirmation Act 1907 (repealed)	7 Edw. 7. c. xlviii	4 July 1907
An Act to confirm a Provisional Order made by one of His Majesty's Principal Secretaries of State under the Metropolitan Police Act, 1886, (Note: Metropolitan Police Act 1886 (49 & 50 Vict. c. 22)) relating to lands in the Metropolitan Boroughs of Paddington and Battersea, and in the Parish of Chipping Barnet. (Repealed by Statute Law (Repeals) Act 2008 (c. 12))
Oregon Mortgage Company Order Confirmation Act 1907	7 Edw. 7. c. xlix	4 July 1907
An Act to confirm a Provisional Order under the Private Legislation Procedure (Scotland) Act 1899 relating to the Oregon Mortgage Company Limited.
	Oregon Mortgage Company Order 1907	
Canal Tolls and Charges (New Junction Canal) Order Confirmation Act 1907	7 Edw. 7. c. l	4 July 1907
An Act to confirm a Provisional Order made by the Board of Trade under the Railway and Canal Traffic Act, 1888, (Note: Railway and Canal Traffic Act 1888 (51 & 52 Vict. c. 25)) containing the Schedule of Maximum Tolls and Charges applicable to the New Junction Canal of the Under takers of the Aire and Calder Navigation.
	Canal Rates and Charges (New Junction Canal) Order 1907	
Land Drainage Provisional Order Confirmation (No. 1) Act 1907	7 Edw. 7. c. li	26 July 1907
An Act to confirm a Provisional Order under the Land Drainage Act 1861 (Note: Land Drainage Act 1861 (24 & 25 Vict. c. 133)) in the matter of certain lands in the Parish of Keadby in the County of Lincoln (Parts of Lindsey)
	Land Drainage (Lincoln) Order 1907	
Land Drainage Provisional Order Confirmation (No. 2) Act 1907	7 Edw. 7. c. lii	26 July 1907
An Act to confirm a Provisional Order under the Land Drainage Act 1861 in the matter of the Oulton Carlton &c. Marshes in the Parishes of Oulton Carlton Colville and Barnby in the County of Suffolk.
	Land Drainage (Suffolk) Order 1907	
Local Government Board (Ireland) Provisional Orders Confirmation (No. 2) Act 1907	7 Edw. 7. c. liii	26 July 1907
An Act to confirm certain Provisional Orders of the Local Government Board for Ireland relating to Dublin and Fermoy.
	Dublin Sanatorium for Consumptives Order 1907	
	Fermoy Order 1907	
Electric Lighting Orders Confirmation (No. 1) Act 1907	7 Edw. 7. c. liv	26 July 1907
An Act to confirm certain Provisional Orders made by the Board of Trade under the Electric Lighting Acts 1882 (Note: Electric Lighting Act 1882 (45 & 46 Vict. c. 56)) and 1888 (Note: Electric Lighting Act 1888 (51 & 52 Vict. c. 12)) relating to Aston Manor (Extension to Erdington) Chesham (Amendment) Hipperholme (Amendment) Lytham Newark (Amendment) Penrith (Amendment) Pontefract and Stockport (Amendment).
	Aston Manor (Extension to Erdington) Electric Lighting Order 1907	
	Chesham Electric Lighting Order 1907	
	Hipperholme Electric Lighting Order 1907	
	Lytham Electric Lighting Order 1907	
	Newark Electric Lighting (Amendment) Order 1907	
	Penrith Electric Lighting Order 1900 (Amendment) Order 1907	
	Pontefract Electric Lighting Order 1907	
	Stockport Electric Lighting Order 1907	
Electric Lighting Order Confirmation (No. 2) Act 1907	7 Edw. 7. c. lv	26 July 1907
An Act to confirm a Provisional Order made by the Board of Trade under the Electric Lighting Acts 1882 and 1888 relating to the rural district of Cork.
	Cork Rural District Electric Lighting Order 1907	
Electric Lighting Order Confirmation (No. 4) Act 1907 (repealed)	7 Edw. 7. c. lvi	26 July 1907
An Act to confirm a Provisional Order made by the Board of Trade under the Electric Lighting Acts 1882 and 1888 the Electric Lighting (Scotland) Act 1890 (Note: Electric Lighting (Scotland) Act 1890 (53 & 54 Vict. c. 13)) and the Electric Lighting (Scotland) Act 1902 (Note: Electric Lighting (Scotland) Act 1902 (2 Edw. 7. c. 35)) relating to the Burgh of Arbroath. (Repealed by North of Scotland Electricity Order Confirmation Act 1958 (7 & 8 Eliz. 2. c. ii))
Electric Lighting Orders Confirmation (No. 5) Act 1907	7 Edw. 7. c. lvii	26 July 1907
An Act to confirm certain Provisional Orders made by the Board of Trade under the Electric Lighting Acts 1882 and 1888 relating to Minehead and Dunster Rhymney Valley (Gelligaer Mynyddislwyn and Bedwellty) and St. Albans and District.
	Minehead and Dunster Electric Lighting Order 1907	
	Rhymney Valley and General Electric Supply Company's Order 1907	
	St. Albans and District Electric Lighting Order 1907	
Ladybank Sewerage, Drainage and Water Order Confirmation Act 1907	7 Edw. 7. c. lviii	26 July 1907
An Act to confirm a Provisional Order under the Burgh Police (Scotland) Act 1892 (Note: Burgh Police (Scotland) Act 1892 (55 & 56 Vict. c. 55)) relating to Ladybank Sewerage Drainage and Water.
	Ladybank Sewerage, Drainage and Water Order 1907	
Education Board Orders Confirmation (Surrey, &c.) Act 1907	7 Edw. 7. c. lix	26 July 1907
An Act to confirm certain Provisional Orders made by the Board of Education under the Education Acts 1870 to 1903 to enable the Councils of the Administrative County of Surrey and the County Boroughs of Birkenhead and Southport to put in force the Lands Clauses Acts.
	Surrey County Council Order 1907	
	Birkenhead County Borough Council Order 1907	
	Southport County Borough Council Order 1907	
Education Board Provisional Order Confirmation (London No. 2) Act 1907	7 Edw. 7. c. lx	26 July 1907
An Act to confirm a Provisional Order made by the Board of Education under the Education Acts 1870 to 1903 to enable the London County Council to put in force the Lands Clauses Acts.
	London County Council (No. 2) Order 1907	
Clyde Navigation Order Confirmation Act 1907	7 Edw. 7. c. lxi	26 July 1907
An Act to confirm a Provisional Order under the Private Legislation Procedure (Scotland) Act 1899 relating to Clyde Navigation.
	Clyde Navigation Order 1907	
Dundee Corporation Order Confirmation Act 1907 (repealed)	7 Edw. 7. c. lxii	26 July 1907
An Act to confirm a Provisional Order under the Private Legislation Procedure (Scotland) Act 1899 relating to Dundee Corporation. (Repealed by Dundee Corporation (Consolidated Powers) Order Confirmation Act 1957 (6 & 7 Eliz. 2. c. iv))
	Dundee Corporation Order 1907	
Gas and Water Orders Confirmation (No. 1) Act 1907	7 Edw. 7. c. lxiii	26 July 1907
An Act to confirm certain Provisional Orders made by the Board of Trade under the Gas and Water Works Facilities Act 1870 (Note: Gas and Water Works Facilities Act 1870 (33 & 34 Vict. c. 70)) relating to Dorking Water Freshwater Gas New Tredegar Gas and Water Skegness Gas and Woking Distinct Gas.
	Dorking Water Order 1907 Order empowering the Dorking Water Company to raise Additional Capital.	
	Freshwater Gas Order 1907 Order empowering the Freshwater Gas Company Limited to raise additional capital and for other purposes.	
	New Tredegar Gas and Water Order 1907 Order empowering the New Tredegar Gas and Water Company Limited to raise Additional Capital.	
	Skegness Gas Order 1907 Order empowering the Skegness Gas Light and Coke Company Limited to raise new Capital.	
	Woking District Gas Order 1907 Order empowering the Woking District Gas Company Limited to raise Additional Capital.	
Portobello and Musselburgh Tramways (Levenhall Extension) Order Confirmation Act 1907 (repealed)	7 Edw. 7. c. lxiv	26 July 1907
An Act to confirm a Provisional Order under the Private Legislation Procedure (Scotland) Act 1899 relating to Portobello and Musselburgh Tramways (Levenhall Extension). (Repealed by Edinburgh Corporation Order Confirmation Act 1958 (7 & 8 Eliz. 2. c. v))
	Portobello and Musselburgh Tramways (Levenhall Extension) Order 1907 Provisional Order for conferring power upon the Musselburgh and District Electric Light and Traction Company Limited to construct a Tramway in the Burgh of Musselburgh and for other purposes.	
Southend Waterworks Act 1907 (repealed)	7 Edw. 7. c. lxv	26 July 1907
An Act to confer further powers upon the Southend Waterworks Company to extend their limits for the supply of water to authorise the transfer to them of the water undertakings of the urban district council of Leigh-on-Sea and the rural district council of Billericay to raise additional capital and for other purposes. (Repealed by Southend Water Order 1958 (SI 1958/1390))
Burnham (Somerset) Pier Act 1907	7 Edw. 7. c. lxvi	26 July 1907
An Act to incorporate the Burnham (Somerset) Pier Company and to transfer to the Company the powers of the Burnham (Somerset) Pier Order 1906 to authorise the Barry Railway Company to subscribe to the capital of the Company and for other purposes.
Hull and Barnsley Railway Act 1907	7 Edw. 7. c. lxvii	26 July 1907
An Act to authorise the Hull and Barnsley Railway Company to construct a pier and railways at Hull and to purchase additional lands and for other purposes.
Southport Birkdale and West Lancashire Water Board Act 1907 (repealed)	7 Edw. 7. c. lxviii	26 July 1907
An Act to authorise the Southport Birkdale and West Lancashire Water Board to purchase certain waterworks from the Skelmersdale Urban District Council and for other purposes. (Repealed by County of Lancashire Act 1984 (c. xxi))
Brighouse Corporation Act 1907 (repealed)	7 Edw. 7. c. lxix	26 July 1907
An Act to confer further powers upon the mayor aldermen and burgesses of the borough of Brighouse in regard to their electricity undertaking and to make further provision in regard to the health local government and improvement of the borough and for other purposes. (Repealed by West Yorkshire Act 1980 (c. xiv))
King Edward's Hospital Fund for London Act 1907 (repealed)	7 Edw. 7. c. lxx	26 July 1907
An Act to incorporate the President and Council of King Edward's Hospital Fund for London to provide for the management of the Fund and for other purposes. (Repealed by Statute Law (Repeals) Act 2013 (c. 2))
Heywood and Middleton Water Board Act 1907 (repealed)	7 Edw. 7. c. lxxi	26 July 1907
An Act to extend the time limited by the Heywood and Middleton Water Board Act 1901 (Note: Heywood and Middleton Water Board Act 1901 (1 Edw. 7. c. ccxxxvi)) for the construction of waterworks to confer further powers upon the Heywood and Middleton Water Board with respect to their water undertaking and for other purposes. (Repealed by West Pennine Water Order 1968 (SI 1968/512))
London United Tramways Act 1907	7 Edw. 7. c. lxxii	26 July 1907
An Act to extend the time limited by the London United Tramways Act 1901 (Note: London United Tramways Act 1901 (1 Edw. 7. c. cclx)) the London United Tramways Act 1902 (Note: London United Tramways Act 1902 (2 Edw. 7. c. ccxlvii)) and the London United Tramways Act 1904 (Note: London United Tramways Act 1904 (4 Edw. 7. c. cxcviii)) for the construction of tramways and the acquisition of lands.
Pontypridd Urban District Council Act 1907	7 Edw. 7. c. lxxiii	26 July 1907
An Act to confer further powers upon the Pontypridd Urban District Council in regard to the appropriation and use of lands to make further provision in regard to their gas undertaking and for other purposes.
Wisbech Water Act 1907	7 Edw. 7. c. lxxiv	26 July 1907
An Act to extend the limits of supply of the Wisbech Waterworks Company and to confer further powers upon that Company.
United Methodist Church Act 1907	7 Edw. 7. c. lxxv	26 July 1907
An Act to authorise the union of the Methodist New Connexion the Bible Christians and the United Methodist Free Churches under the name of "The United Methodist Church" to deal with real and personal property belonging to the said churches or denominations to provide for the vesting of the said property in trust for the United Church so formed and for the assimilation of the trusts thereof and for other purposes.
Great Northern and City Railway Act 1907	7 Edw. 7. c. lxxvi	26 July 1907
An Act to revive and extend the powers for the purchase of lands and to extend the time limited for the completion of the railway and works authorised by the Great Northern and City Railway Act 1902 and for other purposes.
Rawtenstall Corporation Act 1907	7 Edw. 7. c. lxxvii	26 July 1907
An Act to authorise the Mayor, Aldermen, and Burgesses of the Borough of Rawtenstall to construct and work tramways and to provide and work omnibuses; to confer further powers upon them in relation to their electricity and markets undertakings; to authorise them to construct a street work and to acquire lands; and to make further provision with regard to the health, local government, and improvement of the Borough of Rawtenstall, and for other purposes.
Great Central Railway Act 1907	7 Edw. 7. c. lxxviii	26 July 1907
An Act to authorise the construction of new works and taking of lands by the Great Central Railway Company; to sanction and confirm Agreements between the Great Central Railway Company and the Blyton and Frodingham Light Railway and North Lindsey Light Railway Companies, and to authorise the construction of new railways and wharves in the County of Lincoln by the North Lindsey Light Railways Company; to make further provisions with respect to the Great Western and Great Central Joint Railways; to authorise the construction of new railways by the Great Central Railway Company and the Great Northern Railway Company for the purposes of the West Riding and Grimsby Railways, and for other purposes.
Devonport Corporation Act 1907	7 Edw. 7. c. lxxix	26 July 1907
An Act to confer further powers upon the mayor aldermen and burgesses of the borough of Devonport with reference to their water undertaking and their electrical undertaking to make further and better provision with regard to the improvement health local government and finance of the said borough and for other purposes.
Tees Valley Water (Consolidation) Act 1907	7 Edw. 7. c. lxxx	26 July 1907
An Act to consolidate with Amendments and Additions the Provisions of the Acts relating to the Tees Valley Water Board.
Leeds Corporation Act 1907	7 Edw. 7. c. lxxxi	26 July 1907
An Act to empower the Corporation of Leeds to construct additional waterworks and to acquire lands and for other purposes.
Kendal Corporation Act 1907	7 Edw. 7. c. lxxxii	26 July 1907
An Act to transfer the powers of the Kendal Fell Trustees to the mayor aldermen and burgesses of the borough of Kendal to unite the townships within the borough into one parish to abolish certain differential rating and for other purposes.
Central London Railway Act 1907	7 Edw. 7. c. lxxxiii	26 July 1907
An Act to confer further powers on the Central London Railway Company and for other purposes.
Great Yarmouth Waterworks and Lowestoft Water and Gas Act 1907	7 Edw. 7. c. lxxxiv	26 July 1907
An Act to authorise the construction of further waterworks and the taking of water from the River Bure for the purpose of affording increased supplies of water by the Great Yarmouth Waterworks Company and the Lowestoft Water and Gas Company to confer further powers upon those Companies with reference to their respective undertakings and for other purposes.
Bude Gas Act 1907	7 Edw. 7. c. lxxxv	26 July 1907
An Act for incorporating and conferring powers upon the Bude Gas Company.
King's Norton and Northfield Urban District Council Act 1907	7 Edw. 7. c. lxxxvi	26 July 1907
An Act to confer further powers upon the urban district1 council of King's Norton and Northfield with respect to tramways and electric lighting and to make further and better provision for the good government of the said district and for other purposes.
London and North Western Railway Act 1907	7 Edw. 7. c. lxxxvii	26 July 1907
An Act for conferring further powers upon the London and North Western Railway Company in relation to their own undertaking, and upon that Company in conjunction with the Great Western Railway Company in relation to their joint undertaking; for enabling the Company to work certain of their railways by electrical power, and for other purposes.
Penrith Urban District Council Act 1907	7 Edw. 7. c. lxxxviii	26 July 1907
An Act to authorise the Urban District Council of Penrith to construct additional waterworks; to extend the limits of the Council for the supply of gas; to enlarge the powers of the Council in regard to the supply of water and gas; to confer further powers on the Council in regard to markets and fairs, and for the utilisation of lands allotted under an enclosure award; and to make further and better provision with regard to the improvement, health, local government, and finance of the district, and for other purposes.
Worthing Gas Act 1907	7 Edw. 7. c. lxxxix	26 July 1907
An Act to confer further powers upon the Worthing Gas Light and Coke Company.
Alton Military Hospital Act 1907 (repealed)	7 Edw. 7. c. xc	26 July 1907
An Act to enable the Alton Military Hospital to be utilised for the purposes of a Cripples' Home and College. (Repealed by Statute Law (Repeals) Act 2013 (c. 2))
Electric Supply Corporation Limited Act 1907	7 Edw. 7. c. xci	26 July 1907
An Act for transferring to the Electric Supply Corporation Limited certain undertakings authorised under the Electric Lighting Acts 1882 and 1888 and for other purposes.
Ashton-under-Lyne, Stalybridge and Dukinfield (District) Waterworks Act 1907	7 Edw. 7. c. xcii	2 August 1907
An Act to confer further powers on the Ashton-under-Lyne Stalybridge and Dukinfield (District) Waterworks Joint Committee.
Sheffield Corporation Act 1907 (repealed)	7 Edw. 7. c. xciii	2 August 1907
An Act to authorise the Corporation of the City of Sheffield to construct additional tramways and to execute certain street widenings to confer on the Corporation further powers with respect to their water undertaking their markets undertaking and their electrical undertaking to make further provisions with respect to the regulation of traffic and sanitary matters in the City to amend divers provisions of the local Acts in force in the City and for other purposes. (Repealed by Statute Law (Repeals) Act 1989 (c. 43))
Kensington Borough Council (Superannuation) Act 1907 (repealed)	7 Edw. 7. c. xciv	2 August 1907
An Act to provide for the granting of superannuation allowances to the Officers and Servants of the Council of the Royal Borough of Kensington and for other purposes. (Repealed by London Authorities (Superannuation) (Amendment) Order 1967 (SI 1967/1330))
Tynemouth Corporation (Water) Act 1907	7 Edw. 7. c. xcv	2 August 1907
An Act to authorise the Corporation of Tynemouth to construct additional works to borrow additional moneys and for other purposes.
Middlesbrough, Stockton-on-Tees and Thornaby Tramways Act 1907	7 Edw. 7. c. xcvi	2 August 1907
An Act for conferring powers on the Imperial Tramways Company Limited for constructing a tramway and widening and altering roads in the North Riding of the County of York and for other purposes.
Humber Conservancy Act 1907	7 Edw. 7. c. xcvii	2 August 1907
An Act to dissolve the Humber Conservancy Commissioners and the Humber Pilotage Commissioners, and to incorporate the Humber Conservancy Board; and to confer upon that Board the powers of the Humber Conservancy Commissioners and of the Humber Pilotage Commissioners, certain powers of the Hull Trinity House, the power to levy dues, and other powers, and for other purposes.
North Metropolitan Electric Power Supply Act 1907 (repealed)	7 Edw. 7. c. xcviii	2 August 1907
An Act to confer further powers upon the North Metropolitan Electric Power Supply Company, and for other purposes. (Repealed by North Metropolitan Electric Power Supply (Consolidation) Act 1928 (18 & 19 Geo. 5. c. cxviii))
Richmond (Surrey) Electricity Supply Act 1907	7 Edw. 7. c. xcix	2 August 1907
An Act to confirm an agreement relating to the supply of electricity in the Borough of Richmond (Surrey), and for other purposes.
Sunderland Corporation Act 1907 (repealed)	7 Edw. 7. c. c	2 August 1907
An Act to make further provision in regard to the burial grounds for the Borough of Sunderland and the Parishes of Bishopwearmouth Without and Fulwell, in the County of Durham, and in regard to the electricity undertaking of the Mayor, Aldermen, and Burgesses of that borough, and the health, local government, and improvement of the borough, and for other purposes. (Repealed by Tyne & Wear Act 1980 (c. xliii))
Coventry Corporation Act 1907	7 Edw. 7. c. ci	2 August 1907
An Act to confer further powers on the mayor aldermen and citizens of the city of Coventry in relation to their water undertaking to authorise the supply to them of water by the lord mayor aldermen and citizens of the city of Birmingham to extend the area of supply under the Coventry Electric Lighting Order 1891 and for other purposes.
Manchester Corporation Tramways Act 1907	7 Edw. 7. c. cii	2 August 1907
An Act to confer further powers upon the lord mayor aldermen and citizens of the city of Manchester with reference to the construction of tramways and street widenings and for other purposes.
North British Railway Act 1907	7 Edw. 7. c. ciii	2 August 1907
An Act to empower the North British Railway Company to construct a new dock a railway and other works at Methil to confer further powers on the North British Railway Company with reference to their undertaking and upon that Company the Caledonian Railway Company and the Lanarkshire and Dumbartonshire Railway Company with reference to undertakings in which those Companies are interested to authorise the Burntisland Harbour Commissioners to lease lands for graving dock and for other purposes.
Tees Conservancy Act 1907 (repealed)	7 Edw. 7. c. civ	2 August 1907
An Act to extend the time for the sale of certain lands reclaimed by the Tees Conservancy Commissioners to enable the Commissioners to establish a superannuation fund and for other purposes. (Repealed by Tees and Hartlepools Port Authority Act 1966 (c. xxv))
Annfield Plain and District Gas Act 1907	7 Edw. 7. c. cv	2 August 1907
An Act for incorporating and conferring powers on the Annfield Plain and District Gas Company and for other purposes.
Kingston-upon-Hull Corporation Act 1907	7 Edw. 7. c. cvi	2 August 1907
An Act to make further provision in regard to the local government and improvement of the city of Kingston-upon-Hull and for other purposes.
South Wales Mineral Railway Act 1907	7 Edw. 7. c. cvii	2 August 1907
An Act to empower the South Wales Mineral Railway Company to construct a deviation railway to abandon part of their existing railway to raise further money and for other purposes.
Local Government Board (Ireland) Provisional Orders Confirmation (No. 1) Act 1907	7 Edw. 7. c. cviii	2 August 1907
An Act to confirm certain Provisional Orders of the Local Government Board for Ireland relating to the rural district of Ballycastle the Bangor and Newtownards Joint Hospital District and the urban district of Dalkey.
	Cushendall Waterworks Order 1907	
	Bangor and Newtownards Joint Hospital Order 1907	
	Dalkey Order 1907	
Local Government Board (Ireland) Provisional Orders Confirmation (No. 3) Act 1907	7 Edw. 7. c. cix	2 August 1907
An Act to confirm certain Provisional Orders of the Local Government Board for Ireland relating to the rural districts of Rathdown (No. 1) Monaghan Balrothery and Belfast.
	Dundrum Sewerage Order 1907	
	Tedavnet Burial Ground Order 1907	
	Malahide Waterworks Order 1907	
	Malahide Waterworks Order 1907	
	Belfast (Rural) Order 1907	
Board of Education Scheme (Hulme Trust Estates Educational) Confirmation Act 1907	7 Edw. 7. c. cx	2 August 1907
An Act to confirm a Scheme approved and certified by the Board of Education under the Charitable Trusts Act 1853 (Note: Charitable Trusts Act 1853 (16 & 17 Vict. c. 137)) relating to the Hulme Trust Estates (Educational).
	Hulme Trust Estates Educational Scheme.	
Aberdeen Corporation Order Confirmation Act 1907 (repealed)	7 Edw. 7. c. cxi	2 August 1907
An Act to confirm a Provisional Order under the Private Legislation Procedure (Scotland) Act 1899 relating to Aberdeen Corporation. (Repealed by Aberdeen Corporation (Administration Finance, &c.) Order Confirmation Act 1940 (3 & 4 Geo. 6. c. iii))
	Aberdeen Corporation Order 1907	
Education Board Provisional Order Confirmation (London No. 1) Act 1907	7 Edw. 7. c. cxii	2 August 1907
An Act to confirm a Provisional Order made by the Board of Education under the Education Acts 1870 to 1903 to enable the London County Council to put in force the Lands Clauses Acts.
	London County Council (No. 1) Order 1907	
Gas and Water Orders Confirmation (No. 2) Act 1907	7 Edw. 7. c. cxiii	2 August 1907
An Act to confirm certain Provisional Orders made by the Board of Trade under the Gas and Water Works Facilities Act 1870 relating to Herts and Essex Water Mid-Kent Water and Twyford (Berks) Gas.
	Herts. and Essex Water Order 1907	
	Mid-Kent Water Order 1907	
	Twyford (Berks.) Gas Order 1907	
Electric Lighting Orders Confirmation (No. 3) Act 1907	7 Edw. 7. c. cxiv	2 August 1907
An Act to confirm certain Provisional Orders made by the Board of Trade under the Electric Lighting Acts 1882 and 1888 relating to Castleford Egham Formby Grimsby (Extension) Liversedge Maidens and Coombe Mansfield (Extension to Mansfield Woodhouse) Paignton Selby and Stoke-upon-Trent (Extension).
	Castleford Electric Lighting Order 1907	
	Egham Electric Lighting Order 1907	
	Formby Electric Lighting Order 1907	
	Grimsby Electric Lighting (Extension) Order 1907	
	Liversedge Electric Lighting Order 1907	
	Maldens and Coombe Electric Lighting Order 1907	
	Mansfield (Extension to Mansfield Woodhouse) Electric Lighting Order 1907	
	Paignton Electric Lighting Order 1907	
	Selby Urban District Electric Lighting Order 1907	
	Stoke-upon-Trent Electric Lighting (Extension) Order 1907	
Pier and Harbour Orders Confirmation (No. 3) Act 1907	7 Edw. 7. c. cxv	2 August 1907
An Act to confirm certain Provisional Orders made by the Board of Trade under the General Pier and Harbour Act 1861 (Note: General Pier and Harbour Act 1861 (24 & 25 Vict. c. 45)) relating to Tralee and Fenit and Wicklow.
	Tralee and Fenit Pier and Harbour Order 1907	
	Wicklow Harbour Order 1907	
Pier and Harbour Order Confirmation (No. 4) Act 1907	7 Edw. 7. c. cxvi	2 August 1907
An Act to confirm a Provisional Order made by the Board of Trade under the General Pier and Harbour Act 1861 relating to Southwold.
	Southwold Harbour Order 1907	
Tramways Orders Confirmation Act 1907	7 Edw. 7. c. cxvii	2 August 1907
An Act to confirm certain Provisional Orders made by the Board of Trade under the Tramways Act 1870 (Note: Tramways Act 1870 (33 & 34 Vict. c. 78)) relating to Audenshaw Urban District Council Tramway Huddersfield Corporation Tramway Leeds Corporation Tramways Taunton Tramways (Extension) and West Ham Corporation Tramways.
	Audenshaw Urban District Council Tramway Order 1907 Order authorising the Urban District Council of Audenshaw in the County of Lancaster to construct the Tramway in their District authorised by the Audenshaw Urban District Tramway Order 1899.	
	Huddersfield Corporation Tramway Order 1907 Order authorising the Mayor Aldermen and Burgesses of the County Borough of Huddersfield to construct an additional Tramway in the said Borough and for other purposes.	
	Leeds Corporation Tramways Order 1907 Order authorising the Lord Mayor Aldermen and Citizens of the City of Leeds to construct additional Tramways in their City.	
	Taunton Tramways (Extension) Order 1907 Order authorising the Taunton Electric Traction Company Limited to construct an additional Tramway in the Borough of Taunton in the County of Somerset.	
	West Ham Corporation Tramways Order 1907 Order authorising the Mayor Aldermen and Burgesses of the County Borough of West Ham to construct Tramways in their Borough.	
Pier and Harbour Order Confirmation (No. 1) Act 1907 (repealed)	7 Edw. 7. c. cxviii	9 August 1907
An Act to confirm a Provisional Order made by the Board of Trade under the General Pier and Harbour Act 1861 relating to Pwllheli. (Repealed by Pwllheli Harbour Act 1983 (c. xiv))
	Pwllheli Harbour Order 1906 (Note: Although passed in 1907, the short title is specified as the Pwllheli Harbour Order 1906.) Order for the amendment of the rates dues and charges authorised to be taken by the Corporation of Pwllheli in respect of the Harbour of Pwllheli and for the maintenance and regulation of the Harbour and for conferring further powers on that Corporation with reference to the Harbour and for other purposes.	
Pier and Harbour Orders Confirmation (No. 2) Act 1907	7 Edw. 7. c. cxix	9 August 1907
An Act to confirm certain Provisional Orders made by the Board of Trade under the General Pier and Harbour Act 1861 relating to Fleetwood Portsmouth and Sennen.
	Fleetwood Victoria Pier Order 1907 Provisional Order for the construction maintenance and regulation of a pier and works at Fleetwood in the County Palatine of Lancaster.	
	Portsmouth Corporation (South Parade Pier) Order 1907 Provisional Order for the transfer of the Southsea South Parade Pier to the Corporation of Portsmouth and for other purposes in connexion therewith.	
	Sennen Cove Harbour Order 1907 Provisional Order for the management and maintenance of the Harbour of Sennen Cove in the County of Cornwall for the construction of works in connexion therewith and for other purposes.	
Leeds Particular or Calvinistic Baptist Chapel in South Parade Scheme Confirmation Act 1907	7 Edw. 7. c. cxx	9 August 1907
An Act to confirm a Scheme of the Charity Commissioners for the management of the Charity consisting of the Particular or Calvinistic Baptist Chapel in South Parade in the city of Leeds.
	Scheme for the Application or Management of the Charity consisting of the Particular or Calvinistic Baptist Chapel in South Parade in the City of Leeds in the West Riding of the County of York.	
Kingswood Whitfield Tabernacle Scheme Confirmation Act 1907	7 Edw. 7. c. cxxi	9 August 1907
An Act to confirm a Scheme of the Charity Commissioners for the management of the Charity consisting of the Whitfield Tabernacle Schoolroom and trust property in the parish of Kingswood in the county of Gloucester.
	Scheme for the Application or Management of the Charity consisting of the Whitfield Tabernacle Schoolroom and Trust Property in the Parish of Kingswood in the County of Gloucester.	
Longton Congregational Chapel in Caroline Street Scheme Confirmation Act 1907	7 Edw. 7. c. cxxii	9 August 1907
An Act to confirm a Scheme of the Charity Commissioners for the management of the Charity consisting of the Congregational Chapel in Caroline Street in the borough of Longton in the county of Stafford.
	Scheme for the Application or Management of the Charity consisting of the Congregational Chapel in Caroline Street in the Borough of Longton in the County of Stafford.	
Portishead District Water Act 1907	7 Edw. 7. c. cxxiii	9 August 1907
An Act to confer further powers upon the Portishead District Water Company and for other purposes.
Collooney, Ballina and Belmullet Railways and Piers Act 1907	7 Edw. 7. c. cxxiv	9 August 1907
An Act for making railways and piers ill the counties of Sligo and Mayo to be called the Collooney Ballina and Belmullet Railways and Piers and for other purposes.
Lancashire and Yorkshire Railway Act 1907	7 Edw. 7. c. cxxv	9 August 1907
An Act to authorise the Lancashire and Yorkshire Railway Company to construct a new railway to widen certain existing railways and to construct other works to acquire additional lands and for other purposes.
Broadstairs and St. Peter's Urban District Water Act 1907 (repealed)	7 Edw. 7. c. cxxvi	9 August 1907
An Act to authorise the urban district council of Broadstairs and St. Peter’s to construct additional waterworks and to confer on the Council further powers in relation to their waterworks undertaking and for other purposes. (Repealed by Kent Water Act 1955 (4 & 5 Eliz. 2. c. xi))
Western Valleys (Monmouthshire) Sewerage Board Act 1907	7 Edw. 7. c. cxxvii	9 August 1907
An Act to confer further powers on the Western Valleys (Monmouthshire) Sewerage Board to make the Bedwellty and Tredegar Urban District Councils constituent -authorities and for other purposes.
Merthyr Tydfil Stipendiary Justice Act 1907 (repealed)	7 Edw. 7. c. cxxviii	9 August 1907
An Act to amend the Acts for appointing a Stipendiary Justice of the Peace for the parish of Merthyr Tydfil and adjoining places to provide for the application of those Acts in the event of the grant of a separate Commission of the Peace for the borough of Merthyr Tydfil and for other purposes. (Repealed by Mid Glamorgan County Council Act 1987 (c. vii))
Selsey Water Act 1907 (repealed)	7 Edw. 7. c. cxxix	9 August 1907
An Act to incorporate the Selsey Water Company and to enable that Company to supply water in certain parishes in the county of Sussex. (Repealed by Portsmouth & Gosport Water (Regnum Area) Order 1963 (SI 1963/1333))
Midland Railway Act 1907	7 Edw. 7. c. cxxx	9 August 1907
An Act to confer additional powers upon the Midland Railway Company and upon that Company and the Great Western Railway Company and upon the South Yorkshire Joint Line Committee and upon the Cheshire Lines Committee for the construction of works and the acquisition of lands to make provision for transferring the Limavady and Dungiven Railway to the Midland Railway Company and to confer powers upon that Company and the Great Central and Hull and Barnsley Railway Companies with respect to certain authorised railways of the Great Central and Hull and Barnsley Railway Companies and for other purposes.
Birkenhead Corporation Water Act 1907	7 Edw. 7. c. cxxxi	9 August 1907
An Act for empowering the Corporation of the county borough of Birkenhead to obtain a supply of water from the Rivers Alwen and Brenig in the county of Denbigh and for other purposes.
Post Office Sites Act 1907 (repealed)	7 Edw. 7. c. cxxxii	21 August 1907
An Act to enable His Majesty's Postmaster-General to acquire lands in London Chester Bournemouth Eastbourne and Southgate for the public service and for other purposes (Repealed by Postal Services Act 2000 (Consequential Modifications to Local Enactments) Order 2003 (SI 2003/1542))
Paisley Corporation Order Confirmation Act 1907	7 Edw. 7. c. cxxxiii	21 August 1907
An Act to confirm a Provisional Order under the Private Legislation Procedure (Scotland) Act 1899 relating to Paisley Corporation.
	Paisley Corporation Order 1907 Provisional Order to authorise the Provost Magistrates and Councillors of the burgh of Paisley to construct additional Waterworks and new streets bridges and other improvements to borrow money to amend certain Acts relating to the financial police and public health administration of the burgh and for other purposes.	
Leith Burgh Order Confirmation Act 1907 (repealed)	7 Edw. 7. c. cxxxiv	21 August 1907
An Act to confirm a Provisional Order under the Private Legislation Procedure (Scotland) Act 1899 relating to the Burgh of Leith. (Repealed by Edinburgh Boundaries Extension and Tramways Act 1920 (10 & 11 Geo. 5. c. lxxxvii))
	Leith Burgh Order 1907 Provisional Order to provide the Commissioners for the Harbour and Docks of Leith and their undertaking shall be liable to assessment under the Public Health (Scotland) Acts to make provision as to the playing of football and golf and with respect to deficiencies in tramway revenue and for other purposes.	
Aberdeen Corporation Electricity Act 1907 (repealed)	7 Edw. 7. c. cxxxv	21 August 1907
An Act to confer further powers on the lord provost magistrates and town council of the city and royal burgh of Aberdeen in connection with their electricity undertaking and for other purposes. (Repealed by Aberdeen Corporation (Water, Gas, Electricity and Transport) Order Confirmation Act 1937 (1 Edw. 8 & 1 Geo. 6. c. cii))
National Trust Act 1907	7 Edw. 7. c. cxxxvi	21 August 1907
An Act to incorporate and confer powers upon the National Trust for Places of Historic Interest or Natural Beauty.
Llandrindod Wells Gas Act 1907	7 Edw. 7. c. cxxxvii	21 August 1907
An Act for incorporating and conferring powers on the Llandrindod Wells Gas Company and for other purposes.
London County Council (Money) Act 1907 (repealed)	7 Edw. 7. c. cxxxviii	21 August 1907
An Act to regulate the expenditure of money by the London County Council on capital account during the current financial period and the raising of money to meet such expenditure and for other purposes. (Repealed by London County Council (Finance Consolidation) Act 1912 (2 & 3 Geo. 5. c. cv))
Neath, Pontardawe and Brynaman Railway Act 1907	7 Edw. 7. c. cxxxix	21 August 1907
An Act to extend the time for the compulsory purchase of lands for and for the construction of the Neath Pontardawe and Brynaman Railway and for other purposes.
City of London (Union of Parishes) Act 1907	7 Edw. 7. c. cxl	21 August 1907
An Act to provide for the union of the parishes in the City of London into one parish and to make better provision for the local government of the said City and for other purposes.
Swansea Harbour Act 1907	7 Edw. 7. c. cxli	21 August 1907
An Act to authorise the Swansea Harbour Trustees to further extend the West Pier of Swansea Harbour, and to construct a breakwater on the eastern side of the entrance channel of the said harbour, and for other purposes.
Oxford and District Tramways Act 1907	7 Edw. 7. c. cxlii	21 August 1907
An Act to vest the existing tramways in the city of Oxford in the City of Oxford Electric Tramways Limited and to authorise that Company to remove and reconstruct the same and to construct additional tramways in and adjacent to the city and for other purposes.
Renfrewshire Upper District (Eastwood and Mearns) Water Act 1907	7 Edw. 7. c. cxliii	21 August 1907
An Act to empower the District Committee of the First or Upper District of the County of Renfrew to construct and maintain waterworks and to supply water within their district to authorise the county council of the county of Renfrew to acquire the undertaking of the Busby Water Company and other lands and servitudes for the purposes of such water supply to authorise and require the said county council to levy assessments and to borrow money for such waterworks undertaking and supply to authorise the county council to acquire land for sewage purification works and for other purposes.
London County Council (Tramways and Improvements) Act 1907	7 Edw. 7. c. cxliv	21 August 1907
An Act to empower the London County Council to construct and work new tramways and to alter and reconstruct existing tramways and make street improvements and other works in the county of London and for other purposes.
Colne Valley Water Act 1907	7 Edw. 7. c. cxlv	21 August 1907
An Act to confer further powers on the Colne Valley Water Company for the raising of capital and for other purposes.
Glasgow Corporation Act 1907	7 Edw. 7. c. cxlvi	21 August 1907
An Act to authorise the Corporation of the city of Glasgow to construct new tramways and a storm-water overflow to extend the period for the construction of sewage works and the acquisition of properties to make provision with reference to the testing of the illuminating power of the gas supply the stand-by supply of electrical energy the police courts the sale of coal weights and measures the filling up of casual vacancies in the Corporation the meetings of the Corporation the representation of the Corporation in the Convention of Royal Burghs of Scotland the borrowing of further moneys for the tramways and the sewage undertakings of the Corporation and for other purposes.
North Staffordshire Railway Act 1907	7 Edw. 7. c. cxlvii	21 August 1907
An Act to confer further powers upon the North Staffordshire Railway Company; to confirm an agreement for the purchase by that Company of the railway of the Cheadle Railway Company, Limited, and for other purposes.
Armagh Urban District Council Act 1907	7 Edw. 7. c. cxlviii	21 August 1907
An Act for empowering the urban district council of Armagh to acquire the undertaking of the Armagh Toll Committee for extinguishing the Council's liability to pay an annual road contribution to the Armagh County Council for making further provision for the health and improvement of the district and for other purposes.
Dumbarton Burgh and County Tramways Order Confirmation Act 1907	7 Edw. 7. c. cxlix	28 August 1907
An Act to confirm a Provisional Order under the Private Legislation Procedure (Scotland) Act 1899 relating to Dumbarton Burgh and County Tramways.
	Dumbarton Burgh and County Tramways Order 1907	
Dumbarton Burgh Order Confirmation Act 1907 (repealed)	7 Edw. 7. c. cl	28 August 1907
An Act to confirm a Provisional Order under the Private Legislation Procedure (Scotland) Act 1899 relating to the Burgh of Dumbarton. (Repealed by Statute Law (Repeals) Act 1998 (c. 43))
	Dumbarton Burgh Order 1907	
Local Government Board's Provisional Orders Confirmation (No. 1) Act 1907	7 Edw. 7. c. cli	28 August 1907
An Act to confirm certain Provisional Orders of the Local Government Board relating to Barnsley Neath West Ham and Wood Green.
	Barnsley Order 1907	
	Neath Order 1907	
	West Ham Order 1907	
	Wood Green Order 1907	
Local Government Board's Provisional Orders Confirmation (No. 2) Act 1907	7 Edw. 7. c. clii	28 August 1907
An Act to confirm certain Provisional Orders of the Local Government Board relating to Birkenhead Lincoln Milford Haven Shipley and Warrington.
	Birkenhead Order 1907	
	Lincoln Order 1907	
	Milford Haven Order 1907	
	Shipley Order 1907	
	Warrington Order 1907	
Local Government Board's Provisional Orders Confirmation (No. 3) Act 1907	7 Edw. 7. c. cliii	28 August 1907
An Act to confirm certain Provisional Orders of the Local Government Board relating to Brumby and Frodingham the Appleby Joint Cemetery District and the Rugby Joint Hospital District.
	Brumby and Frodingham Order 1907	
	Appleby Joint Cemetery Order 1907	
	Rugby Joint Hospital Order 1907	
Local Government Board's Provisional Orders Confirmation (No. 4) Act 1907	7 Edw. 7. c. cliv	28 August 1907
An Act to confirm certain Provisional Orders of the Local Government Board relating to Bath Handforth Liverpool Nantwich Penryn Pontardawe (Rural) Sheffield and the South Staffordshire Joint Small-pox Hospital District.
	Bath Order 1907	
	Handforth Order 1907	
	Liverpool Order 1907	
	Nantwich Order 1907	
	Penryn Order 1907	
	Pontardawe Rural Order 1907	
	Sheffield Order 1907	
	South Staffordshire Joint Smallpox Hospital Order 1907	
Local Government Board's Provisional Orders Confirmation (No. 5) Act 1907	7 Edw. 7. c. clv	28 August 1907
An Act to confirm certain Provisional Orders of the Local Government Board relating to Chester Chorley Fenton Hanwell Rochford (Rural) Scunthorpe and the Thornton Joint Hospital District.
	Chester Order 1907	
	Chorley Order 1907	
	Fenton Order 1907	
	Hanwell Order 1907	
	Rochford Rural Order 1907	
	Scunthorpe Order 1907	
	Thornton Joint Hospital Order 1907	
Local Government Board's Provisional Orders Confirmation (No. 6) Act 1907	7 Edw. 7. c. clvi	28 August 1907
An Act to confirm certain Provisional Orders of lie Local Government Board relating to Dunstable and the Counties of West Suffolk and East Sussex and West Sussex.
	Dunstable (Extension) Order 1907	
	County of West Suffolk Order 1907	
	Counties of East and West Sussex (Albourne) Order 1907	
Local Government Board's Provisional Orders Confirmation (No. 7) Act 1907	7 Edw. 7. c. clvii	28 August 1907
An Act to confirm certain Provisional Orders of the Local Government Board relating to Barnstable Coventry Honiton and Wallasey.
	Barnstaple Order 1907	
	Coventry Order 1907	
	Honiton Order 1907	
	Wallasey Order 1907	
Local Government Board's Provisional Orders Confirmation (No. 8) Act 1907	7 Edw. 7. c. clviii	28 August 1907
An Act to confirm certain Provisional Orders of the Local Government Board relating to Chelmsford and Merthyr Tydfil.
	Chelmsford (Extension) Order 1907	
	County Borough of Merthyr Tydfil Order 1907	
Local Government Board's Provisional Orders Confirmation (No. 9) Act 1907	7 Edw. 7. c. clix	28 August 1907
An Act to confirm certain Provisional Orders of the Local Government Board relating to Hertford the Goole Joint Hospital District and the Oakengates and Dawley Joint Water Board.
	Hertford Order 1907	
	Goole Joint Hospital Order 1907	
	Oakengates and Dawley Order 1907	
Local Government Board's Provisional Orders Confirmation (No. 10) Act 1907	7 Edw. 7. c. clx	28 August 1907
An Act to confirm certain Provisional Orders of the Local Government Board relating to Bradford (Yorks) Northampton and Wigan.
	Bradford Order 1907	
	Northampton Order 1907	
	Wigan Order 1907	
Local Government Board's Provisional Orders Confirmation (No. 11) Act 1907	7 Edw. 7. c. clxi	28 August 1907
An Act to confirm certain Provisional Orders of the Local Government Board relating to Evesham Melton Mowbray the Dewsbury Joint Hospital District and the Mid-Sussex Joint Water District.
	Evesham Order 1907	
	Melton Mowbray Order 1907	
	Dewsbury Joint Hospital Order 1907	
	Mid-Sussex Joint Water Order 1907	
Local Government Board's Provisional Orders Confirmation (No. 12) Act 1907	7 Edw. 7. c. clxii	28 August 1907
An Act to confirm certain Provisional Orders of the Local Government Board relating to the Borough of East Ham and Urban Districts of Barking Town and Ilford and the Borough of Sunderland.
	East Ham, Barking Town and Ilford Order 1907	
	Sunderland Order 1907	
Local Government Board's Provisional Orders Confirmation (No. 13) Act 1907	7 Edw. 7. c. clxiii	28 August 1907
An Act to confirm certain Provisional Orders of the Local Government Board relating to Norwich and the Counties of London and Middlesex.
	Norwich (Extension) Order 1907	
	Counties of London and Middlesex (Hackney and Tottenham) Order 1907	
Local Government Board's Provisional Orders Confirmation (No. 14) Act 1907	7 Edw. 7. c. clxiv	28 August 1907
An Act to confirm certain Provisional Orders of the Local Government Board relating to Portsmouth and the Waltham Joint Hospital District.
	Portsmouth Order 1907	
	Waltham Joint Hospital Order 1907	
Local Government Board's Provisional Order Confirmation (No. 15) Act 1907	7 Edw. 7. c. clxv	28 August 1907
An Act to confirm a Provisional Order of the Local Government Board relating to Manchester.
	Manchester Order 1907	
Caledonian Railway Order Confirmation Act 1907	7 Edw. 7. c. clxvi	28 August 1907
An Act to confirm a Provisional Order under the Private Legislation Procedure (Scotland) Act 1899 relating to the Caledonian Railway.
	Caledonian Railway Order 1907	
Kilmarnock Corporation Water Order Confirmation Act 1907	7 Edw. 7. c. clxvii	28 August 1907
An Act to confirm a Provisional Order under the Private Legislation Procedure (Scotland) Act 1899 relating to Kilmarnock Corporation Water.
	Kilmarnock Corporation Water Order 1907	
Inverness Royal Academy Order Confirmation Act 1907	7 Edw. 7. c. clxviii	28 August 1907
An Act to confirm a Provisional Order under the Private Legislation Procedure (Scotland) Act 1899 relating to the Inverness Royal Academy and Educational Endowments.
	Inverness Royal Academy Order 1907	
Aberdeen Harbour Order Confirmation Act 1907 (repealed)	7 Edw. 7. c. clxix	28 August 1907
An Act to confirm a Provisional Order under the Private Legislation Procedure (Scotland) Act 1899 relating to Aberdeen Harbour. (Repealed by Aberdeen Harbour Order Confirmation Act 1960 (9 & 10 Eliz. 2. c. i))
	Aberdeen Harbour Order 1907	
Lanarkshire County Council Order Confirmation Act 1907 (repealed)	7 Edw. 7. c. clxx	28 August 1907
An Act to confirm a Provisional Order under tho Private Legislation Procedure (Scotland) Act 1899 relating to Lanarkshire County Council. (Repealed by Lanarkshire County Council Order Confirmation Act 1939 (2 & 3 Geo. 6. c. xcii))
	Lanarkshire County Council Order 1907	
Metropolitan Water Board (Charges) Act 1907	7 Edw. 7. c. clxxi	28 August 1907
An Act to provide for uniform scales of charges for water applicable throughout the limits of supply of the Metropolitan Water Board and for other purposes.
Alexandra (Newport and South Wales) Docks and Railway (Additional Capital, &c.) Act 1907	7 Edw. 7. c. clxxii	28 August 1907
An Act to empower the Alexandra (Newport and South Wales) Docks and Railway Company to raise additional capital for the construction and completion of the dock extension and other works in connection therewith authorised by the Alexandra (Newport and South Wales) Docks and Railway Acts 1904 (Note: Alexandra (Newport and South Wales) Docks and Railway Act 1904 (4 Edw. 7. c. cxciii)) and 1906 (Note: Alexandra (Newport and South Wales) Docks and Railway Act 1906 (6 Edw. 7. c. cliv)) and for the general . purposes of their undertaking
Barry Railway Act 1907	7 Edw. 7. c. clxxiii	28 August 1907
An Act to enable the Barry Railway Company to construct new railways, and for other purposes.
Metropolitan Water Board (Various Powers) Act 1907	7 Edw. 7. c. clxxiv	28 August 1907
An Act to empower the Metropolitan Water Board to make waterworks and other works and to acquire lands and for other purposes.
London County Council (General Powers) Act 1907	7 Edw. 7. c. clxxv	28 August 1907
An Act to empower the London County Council to execute works and acquire lands to make provisions for the health and well-being of the inhabitants of the county of London to confer powers upon the Council of the Metropolitan Borough of Camberwell and for other purposes.
York (Micklegate Strays) Act 1907	7 Edw. 7. c. clxxvi	28 August 1907
An Act to enable the Lord Mayor, Aldermen, and Citizens of the City of York to acquire the rights of the freemen and others in or in respect of certain lands or strays known as the Micklegate Strays, and to make provision for the management thereof, and for other purposes.

=== Private and personal acts ===
Short title	Citation	Royal assent
Long title
Galwey's Divorce Act 1907 (Note: This act was not printed by the King's Printer)	7 Edw. 7. c. 1 Pr.	29 April 1907
An Act to dissolve, the Marriage of Charles Edward Galwey, a Captain in the Royal Irish Regiment, with Annie Louisa Galwey, his now wife, and to enable him to marry again, and for other purposes.
Byrne's Divorce Act 1907	7 Edw. 7. c. 2 Pr.	29 April 1907
An Act to dissolve the Marriage of Henry Morgan Byrne, Barrister-at-Law, With Edith Laura Byrne, his now wife, and to enable him to marry again, and for other purposes.
Baines Name Act 1907	7 Edw. 7. c. 3 Pr.	4 July 1907
An Act to authorise Raymond Hill Baines to assume and bear the Christian Names of Henry Rodd, in lieu of the Christian Names of Raymond Hill.
Murphy Grimshaw's Divorce (Validation) Act 1907	7 Edw. 7. c. 4 Pr.	4 July 1907
An Act to remove doubts as to the validity of a certain Decree, dated thirtieth October, one thousand eight hundred and ninety-three, of the High Court of Justice (Probate, Divorce, and Admiralty Division), dissolving the Marriage solemnized on the sixteenth day of November one thousand eight hundred and eighty, between William Howard Murphy Grimshaw and Mary Evalina Julia Murphy Grimshaw, then Mary Evaliua Julia Woodward, Spinster, and to confirm the said Decree.
FitzGerald's Divorce Act 1907	7 Edw. 7. c. 5 Pr.	26 July 1907
An Act to dissolve the Marriage of Lida Eleanor Purcell FitzGerald with Gerald Purcell FitzGerald, her present husband, and to enable her to marry again, and for other purposes.
Pasley Children Legitimisation Act 1907	7 Edw. 7. c. 6 Pr.	2 August 1907
An Act to declare legitimate certain children of Thomas Hamilton Sabine Pasley.

=== Sources ===
- Volume 45 - 7 Edward VII - 1907 – via Internet Archive.

== See also ==
- List of acts of the Parliament of the United Kingdom
