= Food and Drugs (Adulteration) Act 1928 =

Act of the Parliament of the United Kingdom

Food and Drugs (Adulteration) Act 1928 (Note: Section 38(1).)
- Act of Parliament
- Parliament of the United Kingdom
- Long title: An Act to consolidate the Sale of Food and Drugs Acts.
- Citation: 18 & 19 Geo. 5. c. 31
- Territorial extent: England and Wales; Scotland; Northern Ireland; (Note: Section 36(2).)

Dates
- Royal assent: 3 August 1928
- Commencement: 1 January 1929 (Note: Section 38(2).)
- Repealed: England and Wales: 1 October 1939; Northern Ireland: 23 May 1950; Scotland: 19 June 1956
Other legislation
Amends	See § Repealed enactments
Repeals/revokes	See § Repealed enactments
Amended by	Local Government (Scotland) Act 1947
Repealed by	England and Wales: Food and Drugs Act 1938; Northern Ireland: Statute Law Revision Act 1950; Scotland: Food and Drugs (Scotland) Act 1956

Status: Repealed

Text of statute as originally enacted

The Food and Drugs (Adulteration) Act 1928 (18 & 19 Geo. 5. c. 31) was an act of the Parliament of the United Kingdom that consolidated enactments related to the sale of food and drugs in Great Britain.

== Provisions ==
=== Repealed enactments ===
Section 37 of the act repealed 11 enactments, listed in the fourth schedule to the act.

Citation	Short title	Extent of repeal
38 & 39 Vict. c. 63	Sale of Food and Drugs Act 1875	The whole act, except sections thirty, thirty-one and thirty-six.
42 & 43 Vict. c. 30	Sale of Food and Drugs Act Amendment Act 1879	The whole act.
50 & 51 Vict. c. 29	Margarine Act 1887	The whole act.
55 & 56 Vict. c. 55	Burgh Police (Scotland) Act 1892	In section four hundred and thirty-two the words "under the Sale of Food and Drugs Act, 1875, and also".
62 & 63 Vict. c. 51	Sale of Food and Drugs Act 1899	The whole act.
7 Edw. 7. c. 21	Butter and Margarine Act 1907	The whole act.
4 & 5 Geo. 5. c. 46	Milk and Dairies (Scotland) Act 1914	Section twenty-seven.
5 & 6 Geo. 5. c. 66	Milk and Dairies (Consolidation) Act 1915	Section nine and the Third Schedule.
11 & 12 Geo. 5. c. 32	Finance Act 1921	Section twenty-three.
11 & 12 Geo. 5. c. 42	Licensing Act 1921	Section ten.
17 & 18 Geo. 5. c. 5	Sale of Food and Drugs Act 1927	The whole act.

== Subsequent developments ==
The whole act was repealed for England and Wales wby section 101(1) of, and the first part of the fourth schedule to, the Food and Drugs Act 1938 (1 & 2 Geo. 6. c. 56), which came into operation on 1 October 1939. That section also repealed certain provisions of the act applying to Scotland, and to Northern Ireland and the Isle of Man, listed in the second and third parts of the fourth schedule to that act, respectively.

The whole act was repealed for Scotland by section 60(2) of, and the third schedule to, the Food and Drugs (Scotland) Act 1956 (4 & 5 Eliz. 2. c. 30), which came into operation on 19 June 1956.

The whole act, so far as unrepealed, was repealed for Northern Ireland by section 1(1) of, and the first schedule to, the Statute Law Revision Act 1950 (14 Geo. 6. c. 6), which came into force on 23 May 1950.
