= Food and Drugs (Scotland) Act 1956 =

Act of the Parliament of the United Kingdom

Food and Drugs (Scotland) Act 1956 (Note: Section 61(1).)
- Act of Parliament
- Parliament of the United Kingdom
- Long title: An Act to amend and consolidate certain enactments in Scotland relating to food and drugs, and for purposes connected therewith.
- Citation: 4 & 5 Eliz. 2. c. 30
- Territorial extent: Scotland (Note: Section 61(3).)

Dates
- Royal assent: 15 March 1956
- Commencement: 19 June 1956 (Note: Section 61(2). The Food and Drugs (Scotland) Act 1956 (Appointed Day) Order 1956 (SI 1956/955).)
- Repealed: 1 January 1991
Other legislation
Amends	See § Repealed enactments
Repeals/revokes	See § Repealed enactments
Amended by	Medicines Act 1968; Statute Law (Repeals) Act 1974; Law Reform (Miscellaneous Provisions) (Scotland) Act 1985
Repealed by	Food Safety Act 1990
Relates to	Food and Drugs Act 1955

Status: Repealed

Text of statute as originally enacted

The Food and Drugs (Scotland) Act 1956 (4 & 5 Eliz. 2. c. 30) was an act of the Parliament of the United Kingdom that consolidated enactments related to food and drugs in Scotland.

The Food and Drugs Act 1955 (4 & 5 Eliz. 2. c. 16) made similar provisions for England and Wales.

== Provisions ==
=== Repealed enactments ===
Section 60(2) of the act repealed 14 enactments, listed in the third schedule to the act.

Citation	Short title	Extent of repeal
52 & 53 Vict. c. 11	Sale of Horse-flesh, etc., Regulation Act 1889	The whole act.
60 & 61 Vict. c. 38	Public Health (Scotland) Act 1897	Section forty-three.
3 Edw. 7. c. 33	Burgh Police (Scotland) Act 1903	Section fifty-four. Section ninety-seven so far as relating to the section whereof the marginal note is "Manufacture and sale of ice-cream".
7 Edw. 7. c. 32	Public Health (Regulations as to Food) Act 1907	The whole act.
4 & 5 Geo. 5. c. 46	Milk and Dairies (Scotland) Act 1914	In section twelve, subsection (1), in subsection (2), paragraphs (b) and (c). Section twenty-five.
12 & 13 Geo. 5. c. 54	Milk and Dairies (Amendment) Act 1922	Section four. In section five, subsection (2). Section eight. In section nine, subsection (3). Section thirteen.
18 & 19 Geo. 5. c. 31	Food and Drugs (Adulteration) Act 1928	The whole act.
19 & 20 Geo. 5. c. 25	Local Government (Scotland) Act 1929	In Part I of Schedule I, paragraphs 3, 7, 9, 11, 13, 20 and 26. In Part II of Schedule I, paragraphs 1 and 4.
19 & 20 Geo. 5. c. 32	Artificial Cream Act 1929	The whole act.
22 & 23 Geo. 5. c. 28	Public Health (Cleansing of Shell-fish) Act 1932	The whole act.
1 Edw. 8 & 1 Geo. 6. c. 67	Factories Act 1937	In section one hundred and fifty-seven, subsection (1). Part I of the Third Schedule.
1 & 2 Geo. 6. c. 56	Food and Drugs Act 1938	The whole act.
SR&O 1943/1553	Defence (Sale of Food) Regulations 1943	The whole regulations.
SI 1949/1047	Transfer of Functions (Food and Drugs) (Scotland) Order 1949	The whole order.

== Subsequent developments ==
Section 60(2) of, and schedule 3 to, the act were repealed by section 1 of, and part XI of the schedule to, the Statute Law (Repeals) Act 1974, which came into force on 27 June 1974.

The whole act was repealed by section 59(4) of, and schedule 5 to, the Food Safety Act 1990, which came into force on 1 January 1991.
