= Food and Drugs Act 1938 =

Act of the Parliament of the United Kingdom

Food and Drugs Act 1938 (Note: Section 103(1).)
- Act of Parliament
- Parliament of the United Kingdom
- Long title: An Act to consolidate with amendments certain enactments relating to food, drugs, markets, slaughter-houses and knackers' yards.
- Citation: 1 & 2 Geo. 6. c. 56
- Territorial extent: England and Wales (Note: Section 103(3).)

Dates
- Royal assent: 29 July 1938
- Commencement: 1 October 1939 (Note: Section 103(1).)
- Repealed: 22 November 1955; 19 June 1956 (Note: The The Food and Drugs (Scotland) Act 1956 (Appointed Day) Order 1956 (SI 1956/955))
Other legislation
Amends	See § Repealed enactments
Repeals/revokes	See § Repealed enactments
Amended by	Food and Drugs (Milk and Dairies) Act 1944; Food and Drugs (Milk, Dairies and Artificial Cream) Act 1950; Food and Drugs Amendment Act 1954
Repealed by	England and Wales: Food and Drugs Act 1955; Scotland: Food and Drugs (Scotland) Act 1956

Status: Repealed

Text of statute as originally enacted

The Food and Drugs Act 1938 (1 & 2 Geo. 6. c. 56) was an act of the Parliament of the United Kingdom that consolidated enactments related to food, drugs, markets, slaughter-houses and knackers' yards in England and Wales.

== Provisions ==
=== Repealed enactments ===
Section 101(1) of the act repealed 36 enactments for England and Wales, listed in the first part of the fourth schedule to the act.

Citation	Description	Description	Extent of repeal
32 Hen. 8. c. 40	Physicians Act 1540	Concerning Physicians.	Sections two and three.
1 Mary Sess. 2. c. 9	College of Physicians Act 1553	An Acte touching the incorporations of the Physicians in London.	The whole act.
6 Ann. c. 68 (Note: This is the chapter in The Statutes of the Realm.)	City of London (Garbling of Spices and Admission of Brokers) Act 1707	An Act for repealing the Act of the First year of King James the First intituled an Act for the well garbling of Spices.	The whole act.
5 Geo. 1. c. 11	Adulteration of Coffee Act 1718	The Adulteration of Coffee Act, 1718.	The whole act.
11 Geo. 1. c. 30	Adulteration of Tea and Coffee Act 1724	The Adulteration of Tea and Coffee Act, 1724.	Section nine.
7 Geo. 2. c. 19	Adulteration of Hops Act 1733	The Adulteration of Hops Act, 1733.	The whole act.
26 Geo. 3. c. 71	Knackers Act 1786	The Knackers Act, 1786.	The whole act.
55 Geo. 3. c. 194	Apothecaries Act 1815	The Apothecaries Act, 1815.	Sections three and four, and in section eight the words from "save and except" (where those words first occur) to "medicines, and also".
3 Geo. 4. c. cvi	London Bread Trade Act 1822	An Act to repeal the Acts in force relating to bread to be sold in the City of London and the Liberties thereof, and for other purposes in the said Act mentioned.	The whole act.
6 & 7 Will. 4. c. 37	Bread Act 1836	The Bread Act, 1836.	The whole act.
7 & 8 Vict. c. 87	Knackers Act 1844	The Knackers Act, 1844.	The whole act.
38 & 39 Vict. c. 55	Public Health Act 1875	The Public Health Act, 1875.	Sections one hundred and sixteen to one hundred and nineteen, and one hundred and sixty-six to one hundred and seventy; the Third Schedule and, in the Fourth Schedule, Forms L, M and O.
41 & 42 Vict. c. 49	Weights and Measures Act 1878	The Weights and Measures Act, 1878.	Part II of the Sixth Schedule, so far as respects any local authority outside London who are a market authority for the purposes of this Act.
47 & 48 Vict. c. 12	Public Health (Confirmation of Byelaws) Act 1884	The Public Health (Confirmation of Byelaws) Act, 1884.	Section three, so far as it relates to byelaws made under section one hundred and twenty-eight of the Towns Improvement Clauses Act, 1847, or section forty-two of the Markets and Fairs Clauses Act, 1847, by virtue of their incorporation with the Public Health Act, 1848, the Local Government Act, 1858, or the Public Health Act, 1875.
50 & 51 Vict. c. 27	Markets and Fairs (Weighing of Cattle) Act 1887	The Markets and Fairs (Weighing of Cattle) Act, 1887.	Sections four to nine, so far as respects any local authority outside London who are a market authority for the purposes of this Act.
52 & 53 Vict. c. 11	Sale of Horseflesh, &c. Regulation Act 1889	The Sale of Horseflesh, &c., Regulation Act, 1889.	The whole act.
53 & 54 Vict. c. 34	Infectious Disease (Prevention) Act 1890	The Infectious Disease (Prevention) Act, 1890.	The whole act.
53 & 54 Vict. c. 59	Public Health Acts Amendment Act 1890	The Public Health Acts Amendment Act, 1890.	Paragraph (2) of section three and sections twenty-eight to thirty-one, and fifty.
54 & 55 Vict. c. 70	Markets and Fairs (Weighing of Cattle) Act 1891	The Markets and Fairs (Weighing of Cattle) Act, 1891.	Sections one and two, so far as respects any local authority outside London who are a market authority for the purposes of this Act.
56 & 57 Vict. c. 73	Local Government Act 1894	The Local Government Act, 1894.	In section sixteen, subsection (1) so far as regards functions of a rural district council which are functions under this Act; in section twenty-five, subsections (1) and (7) so far as regards functions of a council which are functions under this Act; subsection (2) of section twenty-seven and section sixty-three so far as regards functions of a council which are functions under this Act.
7 Edw. 7. c. 32	Public Health (Regulations as to Food) Act 1907	The Public Health (Regulations as to Food) Act, 1907.	The whole act.
7 Edw. 7. c. 53	Public Health Acts Amendment Act 1907	The Public Health Acts Amendment Act, 1907.	In section one, the reference to Part IV—Infectious diseases; in section thirteen, the definitions of "dairy", "dairyman" and "infectious disease"; and sections fifty-three and fifty-four.
8 Edw. 7. c. 6	Public Health Act 1908	The Public Health Act, 1908.	The whole act.
5 & 6 Geo. 5. c. 66	Milk and Dairies (Consolidation) Act 1915	The Milk and Dairies (Consolidation) Act, 1915.	The whole act.
12 & 13 Geo. 5. c. 28	Bread Acts Amendment Act 1922	The Bread Acts Amendment Act, 1922.	The whole act.
12 & 13 Geo. 5. c. 54	Milk and Dairies (Amendment) Act 1922	The Milk and Dairies (Amendment) Act, 1922.	The whole act.
15 & 16 Geo. 5. c. 71	Public Health Act 1925	The Public Health Act, 1925.	Sections seventy-one and seventy-two.
16 & 17 Geo. 5. c. 21	Markets and Fairs (Weighing of Cattle) Act 1926	The Markets and Fairs (Weighing of Cattle) Act, 1926.	In section two the words from the beginning to "facilities for weighing cattle and" and the word "respectively"; section three, and the Schedule; so far as respects any local authority outside London who are a market authority for the purposes of this Act.
18 & 19 Geo. 5. c. 31	Food and Drugs (Adulteration) Act 1928	The Food and Drugs (Adulteration) Act, 1928.	The whole act.
19 & 20 Geo. 5. c. 17	Local Government Act 1929	The Local Government Act, 1929.	In section fifty-seven, subsections (2) and (3) so far as regards functions relating to public health which are functions under this Act.
19 & 20 Geo. 5. c. 32	Artificial Cream Act 1929	The Artificial Cream Act, 1929.	The whole act.
22 & 23 Geo. 5. c. 28	Public Health (Cleansing of Shellfish) Act 1932	The Public Health (Cleansing of Shellfish) Act, 1932.	The whole act.
23 & 24 Geo. 5. c. 51	Local Government Act 1933	The Local Government Act, 1933.	In section one hundred and fifty-nine, subsection (2) so far as it relates to purposes which are purposes of this Act.
24 & 25 Geo. 5. c. 51	Milk Act 1934	The Milk Act, 1934.	Section ten.
26 Geo. 5 & 1 Edw. 8. c. 50	Public Health (London) Act 1936	The Public Health (London) Act, 1936.	Subsections (1) to (7) and (9) to (11) of section one hundred and eighty; sections one hundred and eighty-one to one hundred and eighty-three, one hundred and eighty-five to one hundred and ninety-one, two hundred and six and two hundred and seven; in section two hundred and seventy-four, the proviso to subsection (1); in section two hundred and seventy-six, proviso (b) to subsection (1) and subsection (2); and in section three hundred and one the words in subsection (2) from "relating to the registration" to "preserved food, or."
1 Edw. 8 & 1 Geo. 6. c. 67	Factories Act 1937	The Factories Act, 1937.	Subsection (1) of section one hundred and fifty-seven and Part I of the Third Schedule.

Section 101(1) of the act also extended the repeal of 4 enactments to Scotland, listed in the second part of the fourth schedule to the act.

Citation		Short title	Extent of repeal
6 & 7 Will. 4. c. 37	Bread Act 1836	The Bread Act, 1836.	The whole act.
7 Edw. 7. c. 32	Public Health (Regulations as to Food) Act 1907	The Public Health (Regulations as to Food) Act, 1907.	The whole act, in so far as it empowers regulations to be made regarding food (excluding milk).
12 & 13 Geo. 5. c. 28	Bread Acts Amendment Act 1922	The Bread Acts Amendment Act, 1922.	The whole act.
18 & 19 Geo. 5. c. 31	Food and Drugs (Adulteration) Act 1928	The Food and Drugs (Adulteration) Act, 1928.	Section six (except subsections (2) and (7)); sections twelve, twenty and twenty-three; the proviso to subsection (3) of section twenty-seven and subsections (5) and (6) of section twenty-eight.

Section 101(1) of the act also extended the repeal of 1 enactment to Northern Ireland and the Isle of Man, listed in the third part of the fourth schedule to the act.

Citation		Short title	Extent of repeal
18 & 19 Geo. 5. c. 31	Food and Drugs (Adulteration) Act 1928	The Food and Drugs (Adulteration), Act 1928.	Sections twelve and twenty; the proviso to subsection (3) of section twenty-seven; and subsections (5) and (6) of section twenty-eight and section thirty-six.

== Subsequent developments ==
The whole act was repealed for England and Wales by section 136(1) of, and the eleventh schedule to, the Food and Drugs Act 1955 (4 & 5 Eliz. 2. c. 16), which came into force on 22 November 1955.

The whole act was repealed for Scotland by section 60(2) of, and the third schedule to, the Food and Drugs (Scotland) Act 1956 (4 & 5 Eliz. 2. c. 30), which came into force on 19 June 1956.
