= Sale of Food and Drugs Act 1875 =

Act of the Parliament of the United Kingdom

Sale of Food and Drugs Act 1875 (Note: Section 36.)
- Act of Parliament
- Parliament of the United Kingdom
- Long title: An Act to repeal the Adulteration of Food Acts, and to make better provision for the Sale of Food and Drugs in a pure state.
- Citation: 38 & 39 Vict. c. 63
- Territorial extent: United Kingdom

Dates
- Royal assent: 11 August 1875
- Commencement: 1 October 1875 (Note: Section 35.)
- Repealed: England and Wales and Scotland: Northern Ireland:
Other legislation
Amends	See § Repealed enactments
Repeals/revokes	See § Repealed enactments
Amended by	Statute Law Revision Act 1883
Repealed by	Statute Law Revision (No. 2) Act 1893, Food and Drugs (Adulteration) Act 1928, Customs and Excise Act 1952 and Statute Law Revision Act 1953; Northern Ireland: Food and Drugs Act (Northern Ireland) 1958
Relates to	Sale of Food and Drugs Act Amendment Act 1879; Sale of Food and Drugs Act 1899

Status: Partially repealed

Text of statute as originally enacted

The Sale of Food and Drugs Act 1875 (38 & 39 Vict. c. 63) is an act of the Parliament of the United Kingdom that repealed the Adulteration of Food Acts and made new provision for the sale of food and drugs in a pure state in the United Kingdom.

== Provisions ==
=== Repealed enactments ===
Section 1 of the act repealed 4 enactments, listed in that section.

Citation	Short title	Extent of repeal
23 & 24 Vict. c. 84	Adulteration of Food and Drink Act 1860	The whole act.
31 & 32 Vict. c. 121	Pharmacy Act 1868	Section 24.
33 & 34 Vict. c. 26	Poisons (Ireland) Act 1870	Section 3.
35 & 36 Vict. c. 74	Adulteration of Food and Drugs Act 1872	The whole act.

The repeals did not extend to any appointment made under the repealed enactments and not then determined, to any offence committed against them or any prosecution or other act commenced and not concluded or completed, or to any payment of money then due in respect of any provision of them.

=== Special provision as to tea ===
Section 30 of the act required all tea imported as merchandise into and landed at any port in Great Britain or Ireland from 1 January 1876 to be subject to examination by persons appointed by the Commissioners of Customs, with the approval of the Treasury. Tea found on analysis to be mixed with other substances or to be exhausted was not to be delivered except with the sanction of the commissioners, and tea found to be unfit for human food was to be forfeited and destroyed. Section 31 defined "exhausted" tea as tea deprived of its proper quality, strength or virtue by steeping, infusion, decoction or other means.

== Subsequent developments ==
Section 1 of the act was repealed by section 1 of, and the schedule to, the Statute Law Revision Act 1878 (46 & 47 Vict. c. 39), which came into force on 25 August 1883.

The whole act, except sections 30, 31 and 36, was repealed by section 37 of, and the fourth schedule to, the Food and Drugs (Adulteration) Act 1928 (18 & 19 Geo. 5. c. 31), which came into operation on 1 January 1929. That repeal did not affect any regulation, registration, appointment, sample, analysis, direction, order, certificate or approval made, effected, taken or given under the repealed enactments, each of which was to have effect as if made, effected, taken or given under the 1928 act. Save as respects the importation of articles of food and proceedings for offences in relation thereto, the 1928 act did not extend to Northern Ireland.

The whole act, so far as unrepealed, except in so far as it extends to Northern Ireland, was repealed by section 1 of, and the first schedule to, the Statute Law Revision Act 1953 (2 & 3 Eliz. 2. c. 5), which came into force on 18 December 1953.
