= Food and Drugs Act 1955 =

Act of the Parliament of the United Kingdom

Food and Drugs Act 1955 (Note: Section 137(1).)
- Act of Parliament
- Parliament of the United Kingdom
- Long title: An Act to consolidate the Food and Drugs Act, 1938, the Food and Drugs (Milk, Dairies and Artificial Cream) Act, 1950, and the Food and Drugs Amendment Act, 1954, together with certain other enactments amending and supplementing Part V of the said Act of 1938 in relation to slaughterhouses and knackers' yards.
- Citation: 4 & 5 Eliz. 2. c. 16
- Territorial extent: England and Wales (Note: Section 137(4) and (5).)

Dates
- Royal assent: 22 November 1955
- Commencement: 22 November 1955 (Note: Section 137(2).)
- Repealed: 26 September 1984
Other legislation
Amends	See § Repealed enactments
Repeals/revokes	See § Repealed enactments
Amended by	London Government Act 1963; National Loans Act 1968; Theft Act 1968; Medicines Act 1968; Slaughterhouses Act 1974; Statute Law (Repeals) Act 1974; Food and Drugs (Amendment) Act 1981; Acquisition of Land Act 1981; Public Health (Control of Disease) Act 1984
Repealed by	Food Act 1984
Relates to	Food and Drugs (Scotland) Act 1956

Status: Repealed

Text of statute as originally enacted

The Food and Drugs Act 1955 (4 & 5 Eliz. 2. c. 16) was an act of the Parliament of the United Kingdom that consolidated enactments related to food and drugs in England and Wales, including provisions in relation to slaughterhouses and knackers' yards.

The Food and Drugs (Scotland) Act 1956 (4 & 5 Eliz. 2. c. 30) made similar provisions for Scotland.

== Provisions ==
=== Repealed enactments ===
Section 136(1) of the act repealed 13 enactments, listed in the eleventh schedule to the act.

Citation	Short title	Extent of repeal
1 & 2 Geo. 6. c. 56	Food and Drugs Act 1938	The whole act.
S.R. & O. 1946 No. 1757	Transfer of Functions (Secretary of State and Minister of Health) Order 1946	In Article 3, paragraphs (8) and (9); in the Schedule, the entry relating to section fifty-six of the Food and Drugs Act 1938.
9 & 10 Geo. 6. c. 81	National Health Service Act 1946	In Part I of the Tenth Schedule, the entry relating to the Food and Drugs Act 1938.
S.I. 1948 No. 107	Transfer of Functions (Food and Drugs) Order 1948	The whole order.
S.I. 1948 No. 865	Transfer of Functions (Secretary of State and Minister of Health) Order 1948	In rule 2, paragraphs (a) and (b).
14 Geo. 6. c. 35	Food and Drugs (Milk, Dairies and Artificial Cream) Act 1950	The whole act.
S.I. 1951 No. 753	Transfer of Functions (Minister of Health and Minister of Local Government and Planning) (No. 2) Order 1951	In the Schedule, the entry relating to the Food and Drugs Act 1938.
S.I. 1952 No. 2033	Transfer of Functions (Slaughterhouses and Knackers' Yards) Order 1952	In Article 2, in paragraph (1), sub-paragraphs (b) to (f); and Article 4.
S.I. 1954 No. 141	Transfer of Functions (Markets) Order 1954	In Article 2, in paragraph (1), sub-paragraph (a), sub-paragraph (b) so far as it relates to the confirmation of byelaws under section fifty-six of the Food and Drugs Act 1938, and sub-paragraphs (c) and (d).
2 & 3 Eliz. 2. c. 42	Slaughterhouses Act 1954	Part I, except subsection (5) of section three.
2 & 3 Eliz. 2. c. 59	Slaughter of Animals (Amendment) Act 1954	In section nineteen, paragraphs (a) and (c). In section twenty, subsection (2). In section one, subsections (1) to (3). In subsection (2) of section nine, the words "and except so far as it amends the Food and Drugs Act 1938". In Part I of the Second Schedule, the entry relating to the Food and Drugs Act 1938.
2 & 3 Eliz. 2. c. 67	Food and Drugs Amendment Act 1954	The whole act.
S.I. 1955 No. 959	Transfer of Functions (Food and Drugs) Order 1955	The whole order, except so far as it relates to functions under the Welfare Foods (Great Britain) Order, 1954.

== Subsequent developments ==
Section 136(1) of, and schedule 11 to, the act were repealed by section 1 of, and part XI of the schedule to, the Statute Law (Repeals) Act 1974, which came into force on 27 June 1974.

The whole act was repealed by section 134 of, and the ninth schedule to, the Food Act 1984, which came into force on 26 September 1984.
