= Yorkshire (West Riding) Electric Tramways =

Former tram system in West Yorkshire, England

Operation
- Locale: Wakefield, Normanton, Pontefract and Castleford
- Open: 15 August 1904
- Close: 25 July 1932
- Status: Closed

Infrastructure
- Track gauge: 1,435 mm (4 ft 8 1/2 in)
- Propulsion system: Electric

Statistics
- Route length: 24.69 miles (39.73 km)

The Yorkshire (West Riding) Electric Tramways operated two separate tramway services. One in Wakefield between 1904 and 1932, and the other between Normanton, Pontefract and Castleford between 1906 and 1932

== Yorkshire (West Riding) Electric Tramways ==
Operated out of a depot in Castleford, this route ran as follows: Normanton High Street – Whitwood Common – Hightown – Castleford Station – Castleford town centre – Glasshoughton – Pontefract Tanshelf – Pontefract Market Place. Service started on 29 October 1906.

== Wakefield and District Light Railway ==
The Wakefield and District Light Railway operated a network of three tramway lines in Wakefield, centred on the Bull Ring. Services started 15 August 1904 with tramway cars obtained from Electric Railway and Tramway Carriage Works.

== Closure ==
Services ended on 25 July 1932.
