= Milk and Dairies (Consolidation) Act 1915 =

Act of the Parliament of the United Kingdom

Milk and Dairies (Consolidation) Act 1915 (Note: Section 21(1).)
- Act of Parliament
- Parliament of the United Kingdom
- Long title: An Act to consolidate certain Enactments relating to Milk and Dairies.
- Citation: 5 & 6 Geo. 5. c. 66
- Territorial extent: England and Wales (Note: Section 21(2))

Dates
- Royal assent: 29 July 1915
- Commencement: 29 July 1915 (repeal of the Milk and Dairies Act 1914 and the Milk and Dairies Acts Postponement Act 1915); Remainder of the act, not before 1 September 1925 (Note: Section 21, as modified by section 1 of the Milk and Dairies (Amendment) Act 1922.)
- Repealed: 1 October 1939
Other legislation
Amends	See § Repealed enactments
Repeals/revokes	See § Repealed enactments
Amended by	Milk and Dairies (Amendment) Act 1922; Local Government Act 1933; Public Health (London) Act 1936
Repealed by	Food and Drugs Act 1938

Status: Repealed

The Milk and Dairies (Consolidation) Act 1915 (5 & 6 Geo. 5. c. 66) was an act of the Parliament of the United Kingdom that consolidated enactments related to milk and dairies in England and Wales.

== Background ==
The act was a purely consolidating measure: it did not alter the existing law but reproduced in one act provisions previously contained in the Contagious Diseases (Animals) Act 1878 (41 & 42 Vict. c. 74) and Contagious Diseases (Animals) Act 1886 (49 & 50 Vict. c. 32), and the Milk and Dairies Act 1914 (4 & 5 Geo. 5. c. 49), in fulfilment of a pledge given during the passage of the 1914 act.

== Provisions ==
Section 21 of the act provided that it was to come into operation on a day to be appointed by the Local Government Board, except that its repeal of the Milk and Dairies Act 1914 (4 & 5 Geo. 5. c. 49) and the Milk and Dairies Acts Postponement Act 1915 (5 & 6 Geo. 5. c. 59) took effect immediately on passing. The operation of the remainder of the act was subsequently postponed by section 1 of the Milk and Dairies (Amendment) Act 1922 until not before 1 September 1925, and as late as May 1925 its substantive provisions were still described in Parliament as awaiting operation.

=== Repealed enactments ===
Section 21 of the act repealed the Milk and Dairies Act 1914 (4 & 5 Geo. 5. c. 49) and the Milk and Dairies Acts Postponement Act 1915 (5 & 6 Geo. 5. c. 59) with effect from royal assent.

== Subsequent developments ==
The whole act was repealed by section 101(1) of, and part I of the fourth schedule to, the Food and Drugs Act 1938 (1 & 2 Geo. 6. c. 56), which came into force on 1 October 1939. Part II of the 1938 act, which dealt with milk, dairies and artificial cream, substantially reproduced provisions of this act and of the Milk and Dairies (Amendment) Act 1922 (12 & 13 Geo. 5. c. 54).
