= List of acts of the Parliament of the United Kingdom from 1955 =

This is a list of acts of the Parliament of the United Kingdom passed in 1955.

Acts passed before 1963 are cited by the regnal year(s) in which the relevant parliamentary session was held, as opposed to the convention used for later acts of citing the calendar year. Each act passed in a respective session is given a chapter number (abbreviated "c."), denoted by Arabic numerals in the case of public general acts, lowercase Roman numerals in the case of local acts, or italicised Arabic numerals in the case of personal acts. These run as separate series.

86 acts of Parliament were passed in 1955: 49 public general acts, 36 local acts and 1 personal act.

indicates that an act has been transcribed on Wikisource, indicates that an act is available to view at legislation.gov.uk, and indicates the location of the original act in the Parliamentary Archives.

== 3 & 4 Eliz. 2 ==
Continuing the fourth session of the 40th Parliament of the United Kingdom, which met from 30 November 1954 until 6 May 1955.

=== Public general acts ===
Short title	Citation	Royal assent
Long title
Consolidated Fund Act 1955 (repealed)	3 & 4 Eliz. 2. c. 3	29 March 1955
An Act to apply certain sums out of the Consolidated Fund to the service of the years ending on the thirty-first day of March, one thousand nine hundred and fifty-four, one thousand nine hundred and fifty-five and one thousand nine hundred and fifty-six. (Repealed by Statute Law Revision Act 1964 (c. 79))
New Towns Act 1955 (repealed)	3 & 4 Eliz. 2. c. 4	29 March 1955
An Act to increase the amount of the advances which may be made to development corporations under section twelve of the New Towns Act, 1946. (Note: New Towns Act 1946 (9 & 10 Geo. 6. c. 68)) (Repealed by New Towns Act 1958 (6 & 7 Eliz. 2. c. 12))
Cocos Islands Act 1955 or the Cocos (Keeling) Islands Act 1955 (repealed)	3 & 4 Eliz. 2. c. 5	29 March 1955
An Act to enable Her Majesty to place the Cocos or Keeling Islands under the authority of the Commonwealth of Australia, and for purposes connected therewith. (Repealed by Statute Law (Repeals) Act 1976 (c. 16))
Colonial Development and Welfare Act 1955 (repealed)	3 & 4 Eliz. 2. c. 6	29 March 1955
An Act to extend the period for which schemes may continue in force under section one of the Colonial Development and Welfare Act, 1940; (Note: Colonial Development and Welfare Act 1940 (3 & 4 Geo. 6. c. 40)) to increase the amounts payable out of moneys provided by Parliament for the purposes of such schemes; and to include the New Hebrides among the territories for which such schemes may be made. (Repealed by Colonial Development and Welfare Act 1959 (7 & 8 Eliz. 2. c. 71))
Fisheries Act 1955	3 & 4 Eliz. 2. c. 7	29 March 1955
An Act to increase the maximum amount of the grants which may be made out of moneys provided by Parliament to the Herring Industry Board for the promotion of the sale of herring and other purposes; to confer on the Minister of Agriculture and Fisheries and the Secretary of State powers to make grants and loans for the execution, for the benefit of the fishing industry, of harbour and other works and to determine certain existing powers in that behalf; to empower the Secretary of State to operate dredgers; and for purposes connected with the matters aforesaid.
Northern Ireland Act 1955 (repealed)	3 & 4 Eliz. 2. c. 8	29 March 1955
An Act to make further provision as to the salary and expenses of the Governor of Northern Ireland; to transfer to the Court of Appeal in Northern Ireland jurisdiction in respect of certain appeals by way of case stated; to enlarge the legislative power of the Parliament of Northern Ireland in respect of the administration and distribution of estates of deceased persons, the printing and publication of statutory rules, and the appointment, removal, remuneration, jurisdiction and functions of coroners; and for purposes connected with the matters aforesaid. (Repealed by Statutory Rules (Northern Ireland) Order 1979 (SI 1979/1573 (N.I. 12)))
Public Works Loans Act 1955 (repealed)	3 & 4 Eliz. 2. c. 9	29 March 1955
An Act to grant money for the purpose of certain local loans out of the Local Loans Fund. (Repealed by Public Works Loans Act 1964 (c. 9))
Transport (Borrowing Powers) Act 1955 (repealed)	3 & 4 Eliz. 2. c. 10	29 March 1955
An Act to increase the limit imposed by paragraph (b) of subsection (1) of section twenty-six of the Transport Act, 1953, (Note: Transport Act 1953 (1 & 2 Eliz. 2. c. 13)) on the amount outstanding in respect of borrowings of the British Transport Commission. (Repealed by Transport Act 1962 (10 & 11 Eliz. 2. c. 46))
National Service Act 1955 (repealed)	3 & 4 Eliz. 2. c. 11	29 March 1955
An Act to provide for extending the upper age-limit for liability to national service in the case of persons absent from Great Britain in the last year of their said liability, and for purposes connected with the matter aforesaid. (Repealed by Statute Law (Repeals) Act 1977 (c. 18))
Trustee Savings Banks (Pensions) Act 1955 (repealed)	3 & 4 Eliz. 2. c. 12	29 March 1955
An Act to amend the law relating to the superannuation benefits payable in respect of service with trustee savings banks and their inspection committee. (Repealed by Trustee Savings Banks Act 1969 (c. 50))
Rural Water Supplies and Sewerage Act 1955 (repealed)	3 & 4 Eliz. 2. c. 13	29 March 1955
An Act to amend the requirements of the Rural Water Supplies and Sewerage Act, 1944, (Note: Rural Water Supplies and Sewerage Act 1944 (7 & 8 Geo. 6. c. 26)) with respect to undertakings under section one of that Act to make contributions towards expenses incurred by local authorities in connection with water supplies, sewerage and sewage disposal in rural localities; and for purposes connected with the matters aforesaid. (Repealed for England and Wales by Water Consolidation (Consequential Provisions) Act 1991 (c. 60) and for Scotland by Local Government etc. (Scotland) Act 1994 (c. 39))
Imperial War Museum Act 1955	3 & 4 Eliz. 2. c. 14	29 March 1955
An Act to amend the law relating to the Board of Trustees of the Imperial War Museum, and to extend their powers of lending objects belonging to the Museum.
Finance Act 1955 (repealed)	3 & 4 Eliz. 2. c. 15	6 May 1955
An Act to charge income tax for the year 1955-56 and fix the rates of tax for that year, to fix the rates of surtax for the year 1954-55 and to alter the law as to certain of the personal reliefs. (Repealed by Income and Corporation Taxes Act 1970 (c. 10))
Appropriation Act 1955 (repealed)	3 & 4 Eliz. 2. c. 16	6 May 1955
An Act to apply a sum out of the Consolidated Fund to the service of the year ending on the thirty-first day of March, one thousand nine hundred and fifty-six and to appropriate the supplies granted in this Session of Parliament. (Repealed by Statute Law Revision Act 1964 (c. 79))
Isle of Man (Customs) Act 1955 (repealed)	3 & 4 Eliz. 2. c. 17	6 May 1955
An Act to provide for confirming resolutions of the Court of Tynwald with respect to customs duties in the Isle of Man and to authorise the Court of Tynwald to carry out any agreement made with the Government of the United Kingdom as to the payment into the Exchequer of any of the proceeds of those duties. (Repealed by Isle of Man Act 1958 (6 & 7 Eliz. 2. c. 11))
Army Act 1955 (repealed)	3 & 4 Eliz. 2. c. 18	6 May 1955
An Act to make provision with respect to the army. (Repealed by Armed Forces Act 2006 (c. 52))
Air Force Act 1955 (repealed)	3 & 4 Eliz. 2. c. 19	6 May 1955
An Act to make provision with respect to the air force. (Repealed by Armed Forces Act 2006 (c. 52))
Revision of the Army and Air Force Acts (Transitional Provisions) Act 1955	3 & 4 Eliz. 2. c. 20	6 May 1955
An Act to continue the Army and Air Force Acts until the appointed day, and to make, with respect to the replacement thereof by new provisions, certain transitional provisions and savings and amendments of other enactments relating to those Acts or otherwise to the armed forces of the Crown; to make permanent certain provisions contained in the said Acts; and to repeal certain enactments relating to the armed forces of the Crown which are rendered unnecessary by the expiry of those Acts or are otherwise obsolete.
Crofters (Scotland) Act 1955 (repealed)	3 & 4 Eliz. 2. c. 21	6 May 1955
An Act to make provision for the reorganisation, development and regulation of crofting in the crofting counties of Scotland; to authorise the making of grants and loans for the development of agricultural production on crofts and the making of grants and loans towards the provision of houses and buildings for crofters, cottars and others of like economic status; to re-enact the provisions of the Landholders Acts with respect to cottars; and for purposes connected with the matters aforesaid. (Repealed by Crofters (Scotland) Act 1993 (c. 44))
Pensions (India, Pakistan and Burma) Act 1955 (repealed)	3 & 4 Eliz. 2. c. 22	6 May 1955
An Act to enable effect to be given to arrangements as to pensions and connected matters made or to be made between Her Majesty's Government in the United Kingdom and the Government of India or the Government of Pakistan, and to amend the law in relation to certain pensions and other benefits arising out of service in or connected with India, Pakistan or Burma. (Repealed by Overseas Pensions Act 1973 (c. 21))
British Museum Act 1955 (repealed)	3 & 4 Eliz. 2. c. 23	6 May 1955
An Act to empower the Trustees of the British Museum to lend for the purposes of research objects comprised in the collections of the Natural History Departments of the British Museum and to destroy objects so comprised which have become useless by reason of infestation or physical deterioration. (Repealed by British Museum Act 1963 (c. 24))
Requisitioned Houses and Housing (Amendment) Act 1955 (repealed)	3 & 4 Eliz. 2. c. 24	6 May 1955
An Act to repeal the power to requisition land for housing purposes under Defence Regulations and transfer to local authorities in England and Wales the right to possession of requisitioned houses for a limited period; to make provision for the earlier release of such houses in certain cases and for matters connected therewith; to authorise payments out of moneys provided by Parliament in respect of expenditure of local authorities to whom the said right is transferred; to regulate the payment of sums issued out of the consolidated fund under subsection (1) of section eight of the Housing (Temporary Accommodation) Act, 1944; (Note: Housing (Temporary Accommodation) Act 1944 (7 & 8 Geo. 6. c. 36)) to amend sections ninety-four and one hundred and fifty of the Housing (Scotland) Act, 1950; (Note: Housing (Scotland) Act 1950 (14 Geo. 6. c. 34)) and for purposes connected with the matters aforesaid. (Repealed by Statute Law (Repeals) Act 1978 (c. 45))
Oil in Navigable Waters Act 1955 (repealed)	3 & 4 Eliz. 2. c. 25	6 May 1955
An Act to enable effect to be given to the International Convention for the Prevention of Pollution of the Sea by Oil, 1954, and otherwise to make new provision for preventing the pollution of navigable waters by oil. (Repealed by Prevention of Oil Pollution Act 1971 (c. 60))
Public Service Vehicles (Travel Concessions) Act 1955 (repealed)	3 & 4 Eliz. 2. c. 26	6 May 1955
An Act to make provision with respect to the allowing of free travel or reduced fares on public service vehicles run by local authorities and for purposes connected therewith. (Repealed by Transport Act 1985 (c. 67))
Public Libraries (Scotland) Act 1955	3 & 4 Eliz. 2. c. 27	6 May 1955
An Act to remove the limitations imposed by section one hundred and ninety-one of the Local Government (Scotland) Act, 1947, (Note: Local Government (Scotland) Act 1947 (10 & 11 Geo. 6. c. 43)) and by section fourteen of the Public Libraries Consolidation (Scotland) Act, 1887, (Note: Public Libraries Consolidation (Scotland) Act 1887 (50 & 51 Vict. c. 42)) on the annual expenditure and the power to borrow money of county and town councils for and in connection with public libraries; to facilitate co-operation among statutory and non-statutory library authorities; to authorise the revocation of a decision to adopt the Public Libraries Consolidation (Scotland) Act, 1887; and to extend the lending powers of statutory library authorities.
Children and Young Persons (Harmful Publications) Act 1955	3 & 4 Eliz. 2. c. 28	6 May 1955
An Act to prevent the dissemination of certain pictorial publications harmful to children and young persons.
National Insurance Act 1955 (repealed)	3 & 4 Eliz. 2. c. 29	6 May 1955
An Act to increase the income limit by reference to which persons may be excepted from liability to pay contributions under the National Insurance Acts, 1946 to 1954; to increase the weekly rate of remuneration by reference to which the weekly rate of such contributions payable by certain employed persons and their employers respectively falls to be determined; and for purposes connected with the matters aforesaid. (Repealed by Statute Law Revision (Consequential Repeals) Act 1965 (c. 55))

=== Local acts ===
Short title	Citation	Royal assent
Long title
Chatham Intra Charity of Richard Watts and other Charities Scheme Confirmation Act 1955	3 & 4 Eliz. 2. c. ii	29 March 1955
An Act to confirm a Scheme of the Charity Commissioners for the application or management of certain charities in the County of Kent.
	Scheme for the Application or Management of the following Charities in the County of Kent:—: 1. The Charity of Richard Watts applicable under the provisions of an order of the High Court of Chancery of the 9th June 1829 in ease of the rates assessed on the inhabitants of such part (sometime known as Chatham Intra) of the Ancient Parish of Chatham as lay within the liberties limits and precincts of the Ancient City of Rochester; 2. The Charity of Sir Edmund Gregory in the Ancient Town of Chatham founded by will dated the 24th April 1710; 3. The Charity of Samson Burford in the Ancient Town of Chatham founded by will proved in the Principal Registry on the 22nd March 1922; 4. The Charity of Alfred Mannerings in the Borough of Chatham founded by will proved in the Principal Registry on the 26th May 1924.	
University of Hull Act 1955	3 & 4 Eliz. 2. c. iii	29 March 1955
An Act to dissolve the University College of Hull and to transfer the rights property and liabilities of that College to the University of Hull and for other purposes.
Clyde Navigation (Superannuation) Order Confirmation Act 1955 (repealed)	3 & 4 Eliz. 2. c. iv	6 May 1955
An Act to confirm a Provisional Order under the Private Legislation Procedure (Scotland) Act 1936 (Note: Private Legislation Procedure (Scotland) Act 1936 (26 Geo. 5 & 1 Edw. 8. c. 52)) relating to Clyde Navigation (Superannuation). (Repealed by Statute Law (Repeals) Act 1986 (c. 12))
	Clyde Navigation (Superannuation) Order 1955 Provisional Order to amend the provisions of the Clyde Navigation (Superannuation) Order 1908 the Clyde Navigation Act 1929 (Note: Clyde Navigation Act 1929 (20 & 21 Geo. 5. c. xx)) and the Clyde Navigation (Superannuation) Order 1949 relating to the superannuation fund for the officers and servants of the Trustees of the Clyde Navigation and for other purposes.	
Glasgow Corporation (Extension of Time) Order Confirmation Act 1955	3 & 4 Eliz. 2. c. v	6 May 1955
An Act to confirm a Provisional Order under the Private Legislation Procedure (Scotland) Act 1936 relating to Glasgow Corporation (Extension of Time).
	Glasgow Corporation (Extension of Time) Order 1955 Provisional Order to extend the time for the acquisition of lands for the purposes of the tunnels under the river Clyde and relative works authorised by the Glasgow Corporation Order 1948 and for other purposes.	
St. Stephen Coleman Street Act 1955	3 & 4 Eliz. 2. c. vi	6 May 1955
An Act to vest the churchyard appurtenant to the church of Saint Stephen Coleman Street in the London Diocesan Fund to enable the London Diocesan Fund to sell such churchyard to authorise the erection of buildings on such churchyard and for other purposes.
Mersey Tunnel Act 1955	3 & 4 Eliz. 2. c. vii	6 May 1955
An Act to amend certain financial and other provisions of the Mersey Tunnel Acts 1925 to 1949 (Note: Mersey Tunnel Act 1925 (15 & 16 Geo. 5. c. cx), Mersey Tunnel Act 1933 (23 & 24 Geo. 5. c. xxxix), and Mersey Tunnel Act 1949 (12, 13 & 14 Geo. 6. c. xxxii).) and to confer further powers on the Mersey Tunnel Joint Committee and for other purposes.

=== Sources ===
- The Public General Acts and Church Assembly Measures of 1955. London: Her Majesty's Stationery Office. 1955. pp. 1–494 – via Google Books.
- The Public General Acts and Church Assembly Measures of 1955. London: Her Majesty's Stationery Office. 1955. pp. 1–494 – via Google Books.
- The Journals of the House of Commons (PDF). Vol. 210 (November 1954 – May 1955). pp. 3–159 – via parliament.uk.
- Chronological Table of the Statutes: Covering the Period from 1235 to the End of 1971. London: Her Majesty's Stationery Office. 1972. pp. 1092–1106. ISBN 978-0-11-840096-1 – via Google Books.
- "UK Public General Acts from 1955". legislation.gov.uk. The National Archives.
- "UK Local Acts from 1955". legislation.gov.uk. The National Archives.
- "Chronological Tables of Local Acts: Part 178 (1954-1956)". legislation.gov.uk. The National Archives.

== 4 & 5 Eliz. 2 ==
The first session of the 41st Parliament of the United Kingdom, which met from 7 June 1955 until 5 November 1956.

=== Public general acts ===
Short title	Citation	Royal assent
Long title
Austrian State Treaty Act 1955	4 & 5 Eliz. 2. c. 1	6 July 1955
An Act to provide for carrying into effect the Treaty for the re-establishment of an independent and democratic Austria.
German Conventions Act 1955	4 & 5 Eliz. 2. c. 2	6 July 1955
An Act to provide for matters relating to certain tribunals agreed to be set up by conventions with the Federal Republic of Germany and to the enforcement of the customs laws of the Federal Republic in pursuance of those conventions by authorities of Her Majesty's forces.
Appropriation (No. 2) Act 1955 (repealed)	4 & 5 Eliz. 2. c. 3	27 July 1955
An Act to apply a sum out of the Consolidated Fund to the service of the year ending on the thirty-first day of March, one thousand nine hundred and fifty-six and to appropriate the supplies granted in this Session of Parliament. (Repealed by Statute Law Revision Act 1964 (c. 79))
European Coal and Steel Community Act 1955 (repealed)	4 & 5 Eliz. 2. c. 4	27 July 1955
An Act to confer certain immunities and privileges on the representatives in the United Kingdom of the High Authority of the European Coal and Steel Community and their staffs, and the family of the chief representative of that Authority. (Repealed by International Organisations Act 1968 (c. 48) and Commission of the European Communities (Immunities and Privileges) Order 1968 (SI 1968/1860))
International Finance Corporation Act 1955 (repealed)	4 & 5 Eliz. 2. c. 5	27 July 1955
An Act to enable effect to be given to an international agreement for the establishment and operation of an International Finance Corporation, and for purposes connected therewith. (Repealed by Overseas Development and Co-operation Act 1980 (c. 63))
Miscellaneous Financial Provisions Act 1955	4 & 5 Eliz. 2. c. 6	27 July 1955
An Act to make further provision with respect to the Civil Contingencies Fund, to authorise the making of loans for the purpose of implementing potato price schemes and an increase in the loans which may be made to the Government of Northern Ireland, to wind up the Road Fund and to make provision with respect to unclaimed Government stock and other unclaimed rights.
Wireless Telegraphy (Blind Persons) Act 1955 (repealed)	4 & 5 Eliz. 2. c. 7	27 July 1955
An Act to amend subsection (2) of section two of the Wireless Telegraphy Act, 1949. (Note: Wireless Telegraphy Act 1949 (12, 13 & 14 Geo. 6. c. 54)) (Repealed by Broadcasting Act 1990 (c. 42))
County Courts Act 1955 (repealed)	4 & 5 Eliz. 2. c. 8	27 July 1955
An Act to extend the jurisdiction of county courts and, in connection therewith, to amend the law as to costs in and transfers to the High Court, make further provision for the despatch of business in county courts by increasing the number of judges and otherwise, and provide for appeals from county courts on questions of fact, and for purposes connected with the matters aforesaid. (Repealed by Statute Law (Repeals) Act 1971 (c. 52))
Rating and Valuation (Miscellaneous Provisions) Act 1955 (repealed)	4 & 5 Eliz. 2. c. 9	27 July 1955
An Act to amend the law as respects rating and valuation for rating, and for purposes connected therewith. (Repealed by Statute Law (Repeals) Act 2008 (c. 12))
Validation of Elections Act 1955 (repealed)	4 & 5 Eliz. 2. c. 10	27 July 1955
An Act to validate the election to the House of Commons of John Clarke George, Esquire, and Sir Roland Jennings, Knight, notwithstanding their holding certain offices, and to indemnify them from any penal consequences which they may have incurred by sitting and voting as members of that House. (Repealed by Representation of the People Act 1969 (c. 15))
Sudan (Special Payments) Act 1955 (repealed)	4 & 5 Eliz. 2. c. 11	1 November 1955
An Act to provide for the payment of gratuities to or in respect of certain former officials of the Government or Parliament of the Sudan; to increase the superannuation allowances of Sir Robert Howe, lately Governor-General of the Sudan; and for purposes connected with the matters aforesaid. (Repealed by Statute Law (Repeals) Act 1971 (c. 52) and Superannuation Act 1972 (c. 11))
Validation of Elections (No. 2) Act 1955 (repealed)	4 & 5 Eliz. 2. c. 12	1 November 1955
An Act to validate the election to the House of Commons of Christopher John Holland-Martin, Esquire, notwithstanding his holding the office of local Director of the Bank of New Zealand, and to indemnify him from any penal consequences which he may have incurred by sitting and voting as a member of that House. (Repealed by Representation of the People Act 1969 (c. 15))
Validation of Elections (No. 3) Act 1955 (repealed)	4 & 5 Eliz. 2. c. 13	22 November 1955
An Act to validate the election to the House of Commons of Charles Alfred Howell, Esquire, notwithstanding his holding the office or place of member of certain panels constituted in pursuance of the National Insurance (Industrial Injuries) Act, 1946, (Note: National Insurance (Industrial Injuries) Act 1946 (9 & 10 Geo. 6. c. 62)) and the National Insurance Act, 1946, (Note: National Insurance Act 1946 (9 & 10 Geo. 6. c. 67)) and to indemnify him from any penal consequences which he may have incurred by sitting and voting as a member of that House. (Repealed by Representation of the People Act 1969 (c. 15))
Post Office and Telegraph (Money) Act 1955 (repealed)	4 & 5 Eliz. 2. c. 14	22 November 1955
An Act to provide for raising further money for the development of the postal, telegraphic and telephonic systems and of any other business of the Post Office; to make provision with respect to the application of sums arising from the sale of property acquired for the purposes of the Post Office; and for purposes connected with the matters aforesaid. (Repealed by Post Office Act 1961 (9 & 10 Eliz. 2. c. 15))
Rural Water Supplies and Sewerage (No. 2) Act 1955 (repealed)	4 & 5 Eliz. 2. c. 15	22 November 1955
An Act to increase the limit on the contributions out of moneys provided by Parliament which may be made under section one of the Rural Water Supplies and Sewerage Act, 1944. (Note: Rural Water Supplies and Sewerage Act 1944 (7 & 8 Geo. 6. c. 26)) (Repealed by Rural Water Supplies and Sewerage (Scotland) Act 1970 (c. 6) and Rural Water Supplies and Sewerage Act 1971 (c. 49))
Food and Drugs Act 1955 (repealed)	4 & 5 Eliz. 2. c. 16	22 November 1955
An Act to consolidate the Food and Drugs Act, 1938, (Note: Food and Drugs Act 1938 (1 & 2 Geo. 6. c. 56)) the Food and Drugs (Milk, Dairies and Artificial Cream) Act, 1950, (Note: Food and Drugs (Milk, Dairies and Artificial Cream) Act 1950 (14 Geo. 6. c. 35)) and the Food and Drugs Amendment Act, 1954, (Note: Food and Drugs Amendment Act 1954 (2 & 3 Eliz. 2. c. 67)) together with certain other enactments amending and supplementing Part V of the said Act of 1938 in relation to slaughterhouses and knackers' yards. (Repealed by Food Act 1984 (c. 30))
Finance (No. 2) Act 1955 (repealed)	4 & 5 Eliz. 2. c. 17	21 December 1955
An Act to increase certain taxes and otherwise to amend the law relating to the Public Revenue. (Repealed by Income and Corporation Taxes Act 1970 (c. 10))
Aliens' Employment Act 1955	4 & 5 Eliz. 2. c. 18	21 December 1955
An Act to provide for the employment of aliens and British protected persons in civil service under the Crown.
Friendly Societies Act 1955	4 & 5 Eliz. 2. c. 19	21 December 1955
An Act to extend the powers of friendly societies, and amend the Friendly Societies Acts, 1896 to 1948; to make corresponding amendments for trade unions in relation to sums payable on the death of a member; to make provision with respect to the furnishing of information by the Minister of Pensions and National Insurance in connection with claims for benefit from friendly societies and trade unions; and for purposes connected therewith.
Agriculture (Improvement of Roads) Act 1955 (repealed)	4 & 5 Eliz. 2. c. 20	21 December 1955
An Act to make provision, by means of Exchequer grants and otherwise, for the improvement of certain roads situated in, or affording access to, livestock rearing areas; and for purposes connected with the matter aforesaid. (Repealed by Statute Law (Repeals) Act 1986 (c. 12))
Diplomatic Immunities Restriction Act 1955 (repealed)	4 & 5 Eliz. 2. c. 21	21 December 1955
An Act to enable Her Majesty to withdraw personal diplomatic immunities from members of the diplomatic missions of certain foreign sovereign Powers and their families; and to exclude citizens of the United Kingdom and Colonies from the enjoyment of such immunities. (Repealed by Diplomatic Privileges Act 1964 (c. 81))
Expiring Laws Continuance Act 1955 (repealed)	4 & 5 Eliz. 2. c. 22	21 December 1955
An Act to continue certain expiring laws. (Repealed by Statute Law Revision Act 1963 (c. 30))

=== Local acts ===
Short title	Citation	Royal assent
Long title
British Transport Commission Order Confirmation Act 1955	4 & 5 Eliz. 2. c. i	6 July 1955
An Act to confirm a Provisional Order under the Private Legislation Procedure (Scotland) Act 1936 (Note: Private Legislation Procedure (Scotland) Act 1936 (26 Geo. 5 & 1 Edw. 8. c. 52)) relating to the British Transport Commission.
	British Transport Commission Order 1955 Provisional Order to empower the British Transport Commission to construct a railway and to acquire lands to confer further powers on the Commission and for other purposes.	
Writers to the Signet Widows' Fund Order Confirmation Act 1955 (repealed)	4 & 5 Eliz. 2. c. ii	6 July 1955
An Act to confirm a Provisional Order under the Private Legislation Procedure (Scotland) Act 1936 relating to Writers to the Signet Widows' Fund. (Repealed by Statute Law (Repeals) Act 1998 (c. 43))
	Writers to the Signet Widows' Fund Order 1955 Provisional Order to make provision in relation to the regulation and control of the Writers to the Signet Widow's Fund to repeal the Acts now regulating the fund and for other purposes.	
Aberdeen Corporation Order Confirmation Act 1955	4 & 5 Eliz. 2. c. iii	27 July 1955
An Act to confirm a Provisional Order under the Private Legislation Procedure (Scotland) Act 1936 relating to Aberdeen Corporation Order.
	Aberdeen Corporation Order 1955 Provisional Order to amend modify or repeal certain provisions of the Aberdeen City Acts 1939 to 1952 and to confer further powers on the corporation of the city of Aberdeen with respect to the finance administration water supply health and local government of the city and for other purposes.	
Stromness Harbour (Guarantee) Order Confirmation Act 1955 (repealed)	4 & 5 Eliz. 2. c. iv	27 July 1955
An Act to confirm a Provisional Order under the Private Legislation Procedure (Scotland) Act 1936 relating to Stromness Harbour (Guarantee). (Repealed by Stromness (Vehicle Ferry Terminal) Pier, &c. Order Confirmation Act 1972 (c. xx))
	Stromness Harbour (Guarantee) Order 1955 Provisional Order to confer powers on the town council of Stromness for the granting of a guarantee of a loan to the Commissioners for Stromness Harbour to make provision for the levying of a special harbour rate and for other purposes.	
Bournemouth Corporation (Trolley Vehicles) Order Confirmation Act 1955 (repealed)	4 & 5 Eliz. 2. c. v	27 July 1955
An Act to confirm a Provisional Order made by the Minister of Transport and Civil Aviation under the Bournemouth Corporation Act 1930 relating to Bournemouth Corporation trolley vehicles. (Repealed by Bournemouth Borough Council Act 1985 (c. v))
	Bournemouth Corporation (Trolley Vehicles) Order 1955 Provisional Order authorising the mayor aldermen and burgesses of the borough of Bournemouth to use trolley vehicles upon an additional route in the borough of Christchurch.	
Doncaster Corporation (Trolley Vehicles) Order Confirmation Act 1955 (repealed)	4 & 5 Eliz. 2. c. vi	27 July 1955
An Act to confirm a Provisional Order made by the Minister of Transport and Civil Aviation under the Doncaster Corporation Act 1926 (Note: Doncaster Corporation Act 1926 (16 & 17 Geo. 5. c. xxvii)) relating to Doncaster Corporation trolley vehicles. (Repealed by Statute Law (Repeals) Act 1989 (c. 43))
	Doncaster Corporation (Trolley Vehicles) Order 1955 Provisional Order authorising the mayor aldermen and burgesses of the county borough of Doncaster to use trolley vehicles upon an additional route in the county borough of Doncaster.	
Ministry of Housing and Local Government Provisional Order Confirmation (Colne Valley Sewerage Board) Act 1955	4 & 5 Eliz. 2. c. vii	27 July 1955
An Act to confirm a Provisional Order of the Ministry of Housing and Local Government relating to the Colne Valley Sewerage Board.
	Colne Valley Sewerage Order 1955 Provisional order altering a local act. (Note: Hertfordshire County Council (Colne Valley Sewerage, &c.) Act 1937 (1 Edw. 8 & 1 Geo. 6. c. lxxxix))	
Taf Fechan Water Supply Act 1955	4 & 5 Eliz. 2. c. viii	27 July 1955
An Act to amend the enactments relating to the discharge of compensation water by the Taf Fechan Water Supply Board and to confer further powers upon that Board and for other purposes.
Cardiff Corporation Act 1955	4 & 5 Eliz. 2. c. ix	27 July 1955
An Act to amend the provisions of certain enactments relating to the discharge of compensation water by the lord mayor aldermen and citizens of the city of Cardiff and for other purposes.
German Potash Syndicate Loan Act 1955	4 & 5 Eliz. 2. c. x	27 July 1955
An Act to amend the German Potash Syndicate Loan Act 1950. (Note: German Potash Syndicate Loan Act 1950 (14 Geo. 6. c. vi))
Kent Water Act 1955	4 & 5 Eliz. 2. c. xi	27 July 1955
An Act to make further provision in reference to the supply of water in Kent and in certain parishes in East Sussex to provide for the amalgamation of water undertakings for the transfer of certain of such undertakings and for the formation of joint boards and for other purposes.
Nuneaton Corporation Act 1955 (repealed)	4 & 5 Eliz. 2. c. xii	27 July 1955
An Act to make further provision for the improvement health local government and finances of the borough of Nuneaton and for other purposes. (Repealed by Statute Law (Repeals) Act 1995 (c. 44))
Sandown-Shanklin Urban District Council Act 1955 (repealed)	4 & 5 Eliz. 2. c. xiii	27 July 1955
An Act to authorise the urban district council of Sandown-Shanklin to acquire the undertaking of the Shanklin Lift Company Limited and to construct and maintain a lift at Shanklin to confer further powers on the Council in regard to lands and to make further and better provision for the health local government finance and improvement of their district and for other purposes. (Repealed by Isle of Wight Act 1980 (c. xv))
Chatham and District Traction Act 1955	4 & 5 Eliz. 2. c. xiv	27 July 1955
An Act to transfer the undertaking of the Chatham and District Traction Company to the Maidstone and District Motor Services Limited and for other purposes.
Corn Exchange Act 1955 (repealed)	4 & 5 Eliz. 2. c. xv	27 July 1955
An Act to increase the capital and borrowing powers of the Corn Exchange Company and for other purposes. (Repealed by Corn Exchange Act 1969 (c. xxvi))
Liverpool Corporation Act 1955 (repealed)	4 & 5 Eliz. 2. c. xvi	27 July 1955
An Act to confer further powers on the lord mayor aldermen and citizens of the city of Liverpool in relation to streets and the local government health improvement and finances of the city and in relation to their markets undertaking and for other purposes. (Repealed by County of Merseyside Act 1980 (c. x))
Dewsbury Moor Crematorium Act 1955	4 & 5 Eliz. 2. c. xvii	27 July 1955
An Act to constitute a joint board comprising representatives of the mayor aldermen and burgesses of the county borough of Dewsbury the mayor aldermen and burgesses of the borough of Spenborough and the urban district councils of Heckmondwike and Mirfield to authorise the Board to provide and maintain a crematorium and for other purposes.
Maidstone Corporation Act 1955 (repealed)	4 & 5 Eliz. 2. c. xviii	27 July 1955
An Act to empower the mayor aldermen and burgesses of the borough of Maidstone to construct street works and a diversion of the Len River and to acquire lands for those and other purposes to make further provision in reference to lands and for other purposes. (Repealed by County of Kent Act 1981 (c. xviii))
Salford Corporation Act 1955	4 & 5 Eliz. 2. c. xix	27 July 1955
An Act to authorise the mayor aldermen and citizens of the city of Salford to execute a street work in the city and to acquire lands therefor and for other purposes to confer further powers on the Corporation and to make further and better provision for the health local government improvement and finances of the city and for other purposes.
Bristol Corporation Act 1955 (repealed)	4 & 5 Eliz. 2. c. xx	27 July 1955
An Act to alter the limits of the port and harbour of Bristol and of the area within which the lord mayor aldermen and burgesses of the city of Bristol are entitled to exercise jurisdiction as a conservancy authority and as a local lighthouse authority and for other purposes. (Repealed by Bristol Corporation Act 1961 (9 & 10 Eliz. 2. c. xliv))
Cheshunt Urban District Council Act 1955	4 & 5 Eliz. 2. c. xxi	27 July 1955
An Act to empower the urban district council of Cheshunt to acquire lands to provide for the extinguishment of common rights in or over Cheshunt Marsh Thistley Marsh Turners Hill Marsh the Nightleys and Turnford Marsh and for other purposes.
Stock Exchange Clerks' Pension Fund Act 1955	4 & 5 Eliz. 2. c. xxii	27 July 1955
An Act to validate alterations and amendments in the constitution of the fund connected with the Stock Exchange London and known as "the Stock Exchange Clerks' Pension Fund" and to introduce into the principal trust deed constituting such fund a power to alter the provisions thereof and for other purposes.
London County Council (Money) Act 1955	4 & 5 Eliz. 2. c. xxiii	27 July 1955
An Act to regulate the expenditure on capital account and lending of money by the London County Council during the financial period from the first day of April nineteen hundred and fifty-five to the thirtieth day of September nineteen hundred and fifty-six and for other purposes.
Milford Docks Act 1955	4 & 5 Eliz. 2. c. xxiv	27 July 1955
An Act to empower the Milford Docks Company to construct new docks and other works to authorise the raising of additional capital by the Company to confer further powers on the Company and for other purposes.
North Wales Hydro-Electric Power Act 1955	4 & 5 Eliz. 2. c. xxv	27 July 1955
An Act to confer powers upon the Central Electricity Authority for the construction and erection of works and generating stations in the counties of Merioneth Cardigan and Montgomery and for the acquisition of lands and easements for the purposes thereof or in connection therewith and for other purposes.
London County Council (Loans) Act 1955 (repealed)	4 & 5 Eliz. 2. c. xxvi	22 November 1955
An Act to consolidate the provisions of the London County Council (Finance Consolidation) Act 1912 and subsequent enactments with respect to the raising of money for expenditure on capital account and the lending of money by the London County Council to other persons. (Repealed by London Government Act 1963 (c. 33))
Edinburgh Corporation Order Confirmation Act 1955 (repealed)	4 & 5 Eliz. 2. c. xxvii	21 December 1955
An Act to confirm a Provisional Order under the Private Legislation Procedure (Scotland) Act 1936 relating to Edinburgh Corporation. (Repealed by Edinburgh Corporation Order Confirmation Act 1961 (10 & 11 Eliz. 2. c. ii))
	Edinburgh Corporation Order 1955 Provisional Order to confer further powers on the Corporation of the city of Edinburgh with respect to their transport undertaking to enact provisions and confer powers on the Corporation with respect to their slaughterhouses and to authorise them to provide and operate a dead meat market and for other purposes.	
Runcorn-Widnes Bridge Act 1955	4 & 5 Eliz. 2. c. xxviii	21 December 1955
An Act to authorise a variation of the works authorised by the Cheshire and Lancashire County Councils (Runcorn-Widnes Bridge &c.) Act 1947 (Note: Cheshire and Lancashire County Councils (Runcorn-Widnes Bridge &c.) Act 1947 (10 & 11 Geo. 6. c. xxix)) to amend that Act in certain respects and for other purposes.
London County Council (General Powers) Act 1955	4 & 5 Eliz. 2. c. xxix	21 December 1955
An Act to confer further powers upon the London County Council and other authorities and for other purposes.
British Transport Commission Act 1955	4 & 5 Eliz. 2. c. xxx	21 December 1955
An Act to empower the British Transport Commission to construct works and to acquire lands to authorise the closing for navigation of portions of certain inland waterways to extend the time for the compulsory purchase of certain lands and the completion of certain works to confer further powers on the Commission to authorise the deposit with the Commission of capital moneys of the London Transport (Administrative and Supervisory) Staff Superannuation Fund and for other purposes.

=== Private and personal acts ===
Short title	Citation	Royal assent
Long title
Hillingdon Estate Act 1955	4 & 5 Eliz. 2. c. 1 Pr.	21 December 1955
An Act for varying the provisions relating to property subject to the trusts of a settlement dated the fourteenth August nineteen hundred and forty-four of Arthur Robert third Baron Hillingdon.

=== Sources ===
- The Public General Acts and Church Assembly Measures of 1955. London: Her Majesty's Stationery Office. 1955. pp. 495–747 – via Google Books.
- The Public General Acts and Church Assembly Measures of 1955. London: Her Majesty's Stationery Office. 1955. pp. 495–747 – via Google Books.
- The Journals of the House of Commons (PDF). Vol. 211 (June 1955 – November 1956). pp. 3–432 – via parliament.uk.
- Chronological Table of the Statutes: Covering the Period from 1235 to the End of 1971. London: Her Majesty's Stationery Office. 1972. pp. 1106–1108. ISBN 978-0-11-840096-1 – via Google Books.
- "UK Public General Acts from 1955". legislation.gov.uk. The National Archives.
- "UK Local Acts from 1955". legislation.gov.uk. The National Archives.
- "UK Private and Personal Acts from 1955". legislation.gov.uk. The National Archives.
- "Chronological Tables of Local Acts: Part 178 (1954-1956)". legislation.gov.uk. The National Archives.
- "Chronological Tables of the Private and Personal Acts: Part 33 (1910-1987)". legislation.gov.uk. The National Archives.

== See also ==
- List of acts of the Parliament of the United Kingdom
