= Heritable Jurisdictions (Scotland) Act 1746 =

Act of the Parliament of Great Britain

Heritable Jurisdictions (Scotland) Act 1746 (Note: The citation of this act by this short title was authorised by section 1 of, and the first schedule to, the Short Titles Act 1896. Due to the repeal of those provisions it is now authorised by section 19(2) of the Interpretation Act 1978.)
- Act of Parliament
- Parliament of Great Britain
- Long title: An Act for taking away and abolishing the Heretable Jurisdictions in Scotland; and for making Satisfaction to the Proprietors thereof; and for restoring such Jurisdictions to the Crown; and for making more effectual Provision for the Administration of Justice throughout that Part of the United Kingdom, by the King’s Courts and Judges there; ...and for rendering the Union of the Two Kingdoms more complete.
- Citation: 20 Geo. 2. c. 43
- Territorial extent: Great Britain

Dates
- Royal assent: 17 June 1747
- Commencement: 25 March 1748 (Note: Section 1.)

Other legislation
- Amended by: Continuance, etc., of Acts, 1757; Statute Law Revision Act 1867; Promissory Oaths Act 1871; Statute Law Revision Act 1887; Statute Law Revision Act 1888; Statute Law Revision Act 1892; Sheriff Courts (Scotland) Act 1907; Circuit Courts and Criminal Procedure (Scotland) Act 1925; Statute Law Revision Act 1948; Statute Law (Repeals) Act 1986; Debtors (Scotland) Act 1987; Criminal Justice (Scotland) Act 1987; Statute Law (Repeals) Act 1993; Scotland Act 1998 (Consequential Modifications) (No.2) Order 1999
- Relates to: Acts of Union 1707; Act of Proscription 1746; Sheriffs (Scotland) Act 1747

Status: Amended

Text of statute as originally enacted

Revised text of statute as amended

Text of the Heritable Jurisdictions (Scotland) Act 1746 as in force today (including any amendments) within the United Kingdom, from legislation.gov.uk.

The Heritable Jurisdictions (Scotland) Act 1746 (20 Geo. 2. c. 43) or the Sheriffs Act 1747 is an act of the Parliament of Great Britain passed in the aftermath of the Jacobite rising of 1745 abolishing judicial rights held by Scots heritors. These were a significant source of power, especially for clan chiefs since it gave them a large measure of control over their tenants. As of 2025, the act is partly in force in Scotland.

The act was one of a number of measures taken after the defeat of the 1745 rising to weaken the traditional rights held by clan chiefs, including the Act of Proscription 1746 (19 Geo. 2. c. 39). There had been a number of previous attempts to either eliminate or weaken them; for example, the 1692 Church of Scotland Settlement removed the right of heritors to nominate church ministers for their own parishes.

The act gave the Crown control over the appointment of Sheriffs, with the role of Justiciar transferred to the High Court of Justiciary. Since these were recognised as private property under Article XX of the 1707 Act of Union, their owners were compensated, although Jacobites were excluded. George II praised the act as measures for "better securing the liberties of the people there". The Prime Minister Henry Pelham considered it the most important measure in dealing with Jacobitism in Scotland.

== Purpose ==
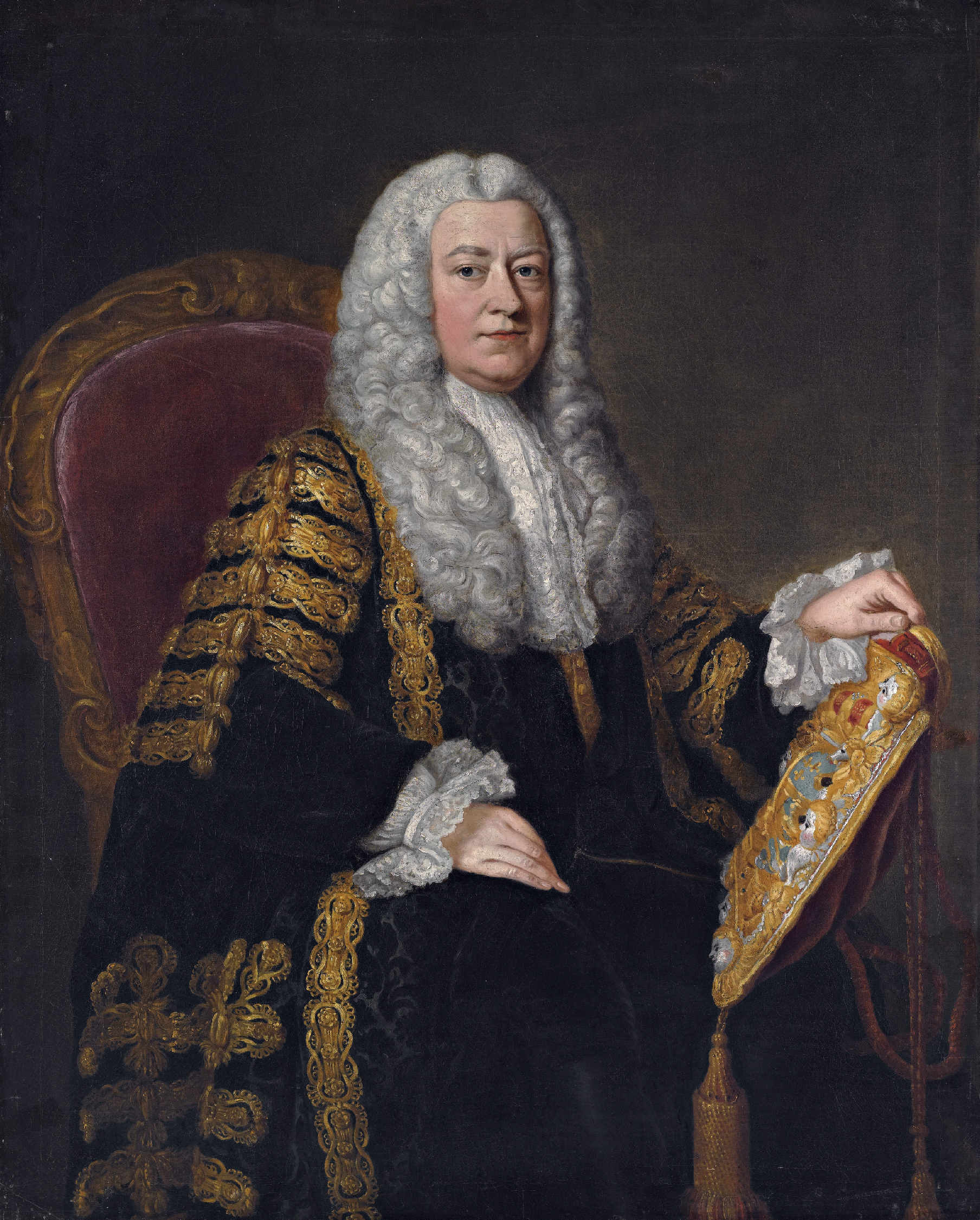
Philip Yorke, 1st Earl of Hardwicke (1690–1764) who drafted the 1746 act.

The long title of the act, which sets out the scheme and intention, is:

An Act for taking away and abolishing the Heretable Jurisdictions in Scotland; and for making Satisfaction to the Proprietors thereof; and for restoring such Jurisdictions to the Crown; and for making more effectual Provision for the Administration of Justice throughout that Part of the United Kingdom, by the King’s Courts and Judges there; ... and for rendering the Union of the Two Kingdoms more complete.
For remedying the inconveniences that have arisen and may arise from the multiplicity and extent of heretable jurisdictions in Scotland, for making satisfaction to the proprietors thereof, for restoring to the crown the powers of jurisdiction originally and properly belonging thereto, according to the constitution, and for extending the influence, benefit, and protection of the King’s laws and courts of justice to all his Majesty’s subjects in Scotland, and for rendering the union more complete.

== History ==
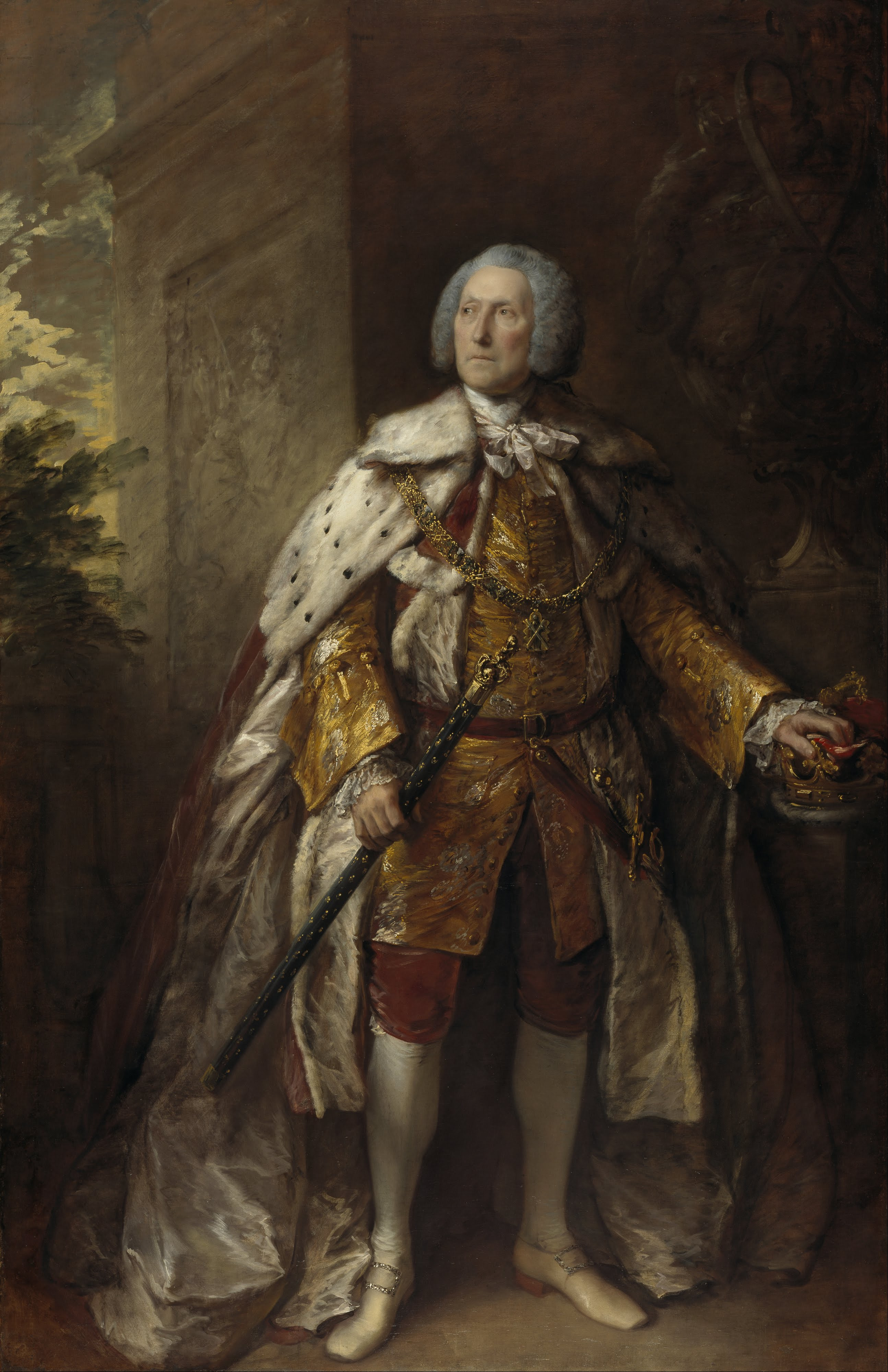
John Campbell, 4th Duke of Argyll (1693–1770); paid £25,000

The act was one of a number of measures taken after the defeat of the 1745 Jacobite Rising to weaken the traditional rights held by clan chiefs, the others being the 1746 Dress Act and the Act of Proscription.

Such rights were not restricted to clan chiefs and were widespread throughout Scotland. There had been a number of previous attempts to either eliminate or weaken them; for example, the 1692 Church of Scotland Settlement removed the right of heritors to nominate church ministers for their own parishes.

Many remained, one of the most significant being control of the thirty-three Sheriffs who presided over the Scottish court system. In 1745, only eight of these were appointed by the Crown, three were appointed for life, with the rest being hereditary; their owners employed legal professionals known as Sheriff-substitutes or deputes, who earned their salary by taking a percentage of the fines imposed.

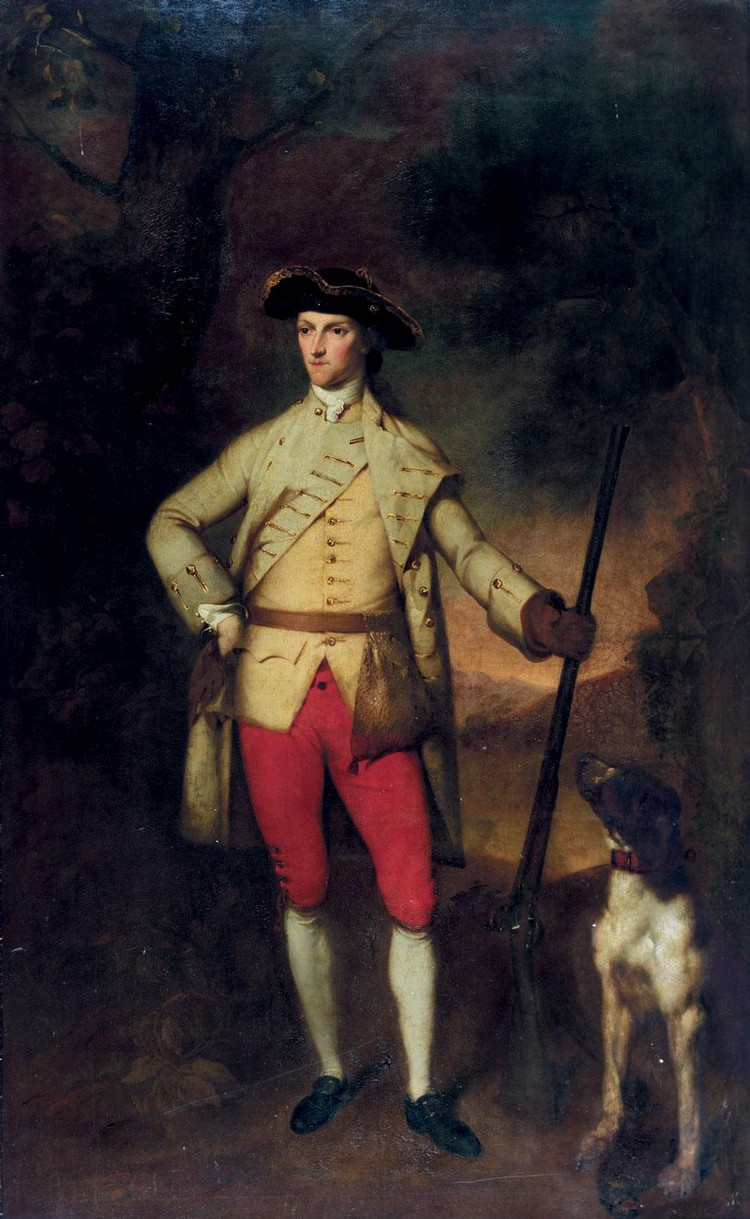
James, Duke of Hamilton (1724–1758); received £38,000 in compensation

The act gave the Crown control over the appointment of Sheriffs, with the role of Justiciar transferred to the High Court of Justiciary. Since these were recognised as private property under Article XX of the 1707 Act of Union, their owners were compensated, although Jacobites were excluded.

A total of £152,000 was paid out in compensation, the two biggest payments being £38,000 to the Duke of Hamilton and £25,000 to the Duke of Argyll. Other recipients included Sir Andrew Agnew, hereditary sheriff of Wigtownshire, who received £4,000 in recognition of his support for the government in 1745.

In speaking for the Bill, Lord Hardwicke argued Crown control over such rights was essential; since 'the people will follow those who have the power to protect or hurt them;' it was therefore imperative for ministers of a constitutional monarch to remove such powers from private ownership. In response, Argyll quoted Montesquieu in support of his argument that multiple jurisdictions were a check on the Crown and thus a defence of liberty.

Since Argyll was one of the main beneficiaries, his intervention was simply to enable Hardwicke to highlight the House of Stuart's outdated belief in the divine right of kings and unquestioning obedience. He did so by agreeing such safeguards were required for states ruled by an absolute monarch but 'fortunately, Britain was not in that position.' This was because the constitution limited the powers of the Crown and ensured liberty; on the other hand, private jurisdictions endangered it by encroaching on the legal authority of a constitutional monarchy.

George II, in a speech also written by Hardwicke, praised the act as measures for "better securing the liberties of the people there". The Prime Minister Henry Pelham considered it the most important measure in dealing with Jacobitism in Scotland. Most of its provisions have since been repealed, but it still specifies that any noble title created in Scotland after 6 June 1747 may grant no rights beyond those of landlordship (collecting rents).

So much of the act "as relates to the power of appealing to the circuit court in civil cases" was made perpetual by section 7 of the Continuance, etc., of Acts, 1757 (31 Geo. 2. c. 42). The last remnants of feudal tenure in Scotland were ended by the Abolition of Feudal Tenure etc. (Scotland) Act 2000 which came into force on 28 November 2004.

== Subsequent developments ==
The position of sheriff-principal originated in the 13th century and still exists in modern Scotland. Originally appointed by the Crown, over the centuries the majority had become hereditary, the holders appointing legal professionals known as sheriff-deputes to do the work. The act returned control of these to the Crown.

Since article XX of the 1707 Acts of Union recognised these rights as property, compensation was paid to the deprived heritors. The act received royal assent on 17 June 1747, but is dated 1746 under the convention of the time which assigned acts to the year in which that sessions of parliament began sitting.

Sections 23 and 44, and so much of section 29 as relates to the taking of oaths, was repealed by section 1 of, and part II of schedule one to, the Promissory Oaths Act 1871 (34 & 35 Vict. c. 48), which came into force on 13 July 1871.

Sections 1, 2, 24, 26 and 27 of the act were repealed by section 1(1) of, and group 1 of part I of schedule 1 to, the Statute Law (Repeals) Act 1993, which came into force on 5 November 1993.

== See also ==
- Attainder
- Act of Proscription 1746
- Disarming Act 1716
- Dress Act 1746

== Bibliography ==
- Browning, Reed, ‘Lord Hardwicke, the Court Whig as Legist’, Political and Constitutional Ideas of the Court Whigs (Louisiana State University Press, 1982)
