= Dress Act 1746 =

Legislation restricting the wearing of the kilt

Disarming the Highlands, etc. Act 1745
- Act of Parliament
- Parliament of Great Britain
- Long title: An act for the more effectual disarming the highlands in Scotland; ... An act for the more effectual disarming the highlands in Scotland; and for the more effectual securing the peace of the said highlands; and for restraining the use of the highland dress; and for further indemnifying such persons as have acted in the defence of His Majesty's person and government, during the unnatural rebellion; and for indemnifying the judges and other officers of the court of judiciary in Scotland, for not performing the northern circuit in May, one thousand seven hundred and forty six; and for obliging the masters and teachers of private schools in Scotland, and chaplains, tutors and governors of children or youth, to take the oaths to his Majesty, his heirs and successors, and to register the same.
- Citation: 19 Geo. 2. c. 39
- Territorial extent: Scotland (Note: Preamble.)

Dates
- Royal assent: 12 August 1746
- Commencement: 1 August 1746 (Note: Section 1.)
- Repealed: 13 July 1871
Other legislation
Repeals/revokes	Disarming Act 1715
Amended by	Highlands Services Act 1715; Sales to the Crown Act 1746; Use of Highland Dress Act 1782; Statute Law Revision Act 1867
Repealed by	Promissory Oaths Act 1871
Relates to	Bail in Criminal Cases (Scotland) Act 1724; Heritable Jurisdictions (Scotland) Act 1746

Status: Repealed

Text of statute as originally enacted

The Dress Act 1746, also known as the Disclothing Act, was part of the Act of Proscription (19 Geo. 2. c. 39) which came into force on 1 August 1746 and made it illegal to wear "the Highland Dress" — including the kilt — by men and boys in Scotland north of the Highland line running from Perth in the east to Dumbarton in the west. The rest of the Act of Proscription reiterated and reinforced the Disarming Act 1715. The Jacobite risings between 1689 and 1746 found their most effective support amongst the Scottish clans, and this act was part of a series of measures attempting to bring the clans under government control. An exemption allowed the kilt to be worn in the army's Highland regiments along with its veterans who had served in the military. The landed gentry were also exempt, being exempt from the entire Act of Proscription.

The law was repealed in 1782. By that time, kilts and tartans were no longer ordinary Highland wear, ended by enforcement of the law. Within two years, Highland aristocrats set up the Highland Society of Edinburgh and soon other clubs followed with aims including promoting "the general use of the ancient Highland dress". This would lead to the Highland pageant of the visit of King George IV to Scotland.

== The act ==
Abolition and Proscription of the Highland Dress (19 Geo. 2. c. 39, s. 17, 1746):

That from and after the first day of August, One thousand, seven hundred and forty-seven, no man or boy within that part of Britain called Scotland, other than such as shall be employed as Officers and Soldiers in His Majesty's Forces, shall, on any pretext whatever, wear or put on the clothes commonly called Highland clothes (that is to say) the Plaid, Philabeg, or little Kilt, Trowse, Shoulder-belts, or any part whatever of what peculiarly belongs to the Highland Garb; and that no tartan or party-coloured plaid of stuff shall be used for Great Coats or upper coats, and if any such person shall presume after the said first day of August, to wear or put on the aforesaid garment or any part of them, every such person so offending ... For the first offence, shall be liable to be imprisoned for 6 months, and on the second offence, to be transported to any of His Majesty's plantations beyond the seas, there to remain for the space of seven years.

== Repeal ==
Use of Highland Dress Act 1782
- Act of Parliament
- Parliament of Great Britain
- Long title: An Act to repeal so much of an Act made in the Nineteenth Year of King George the Second, (for the more effectual disarming the Highlands in Scotland, and for the other Purposes therein mentioned,) as restrains the Use of the Highland Dress.
- Citation: 22 Geo. 3. c. 63
- Territorial extent: Great Britain

Dates
- Royal assent: 1 July 1782
- Commencement: 27 November 1781 (Note: Section 1.)
- Repealed: 21 August 1871
Other legislation
Amends	Disarming the Highlands, etc. Act 1745
Repealed by	Statute Law Revision Act 1871

Status: Repealed

Text of statute as originally enacted

On 1 July 1782, royal assent was given to the Use of Highland Dress Act 1782 (22 Geo. 3. c. 63) and a proclamation issued in Gaelic and English announced:

Listen Men. This is bringing before all the Sons of the Gael, the King and Parliament of Britain have forever abolished the act against the Highland Dress; which came down to the Clans from the beginning of the world to the year 1746. This must bring great joy to every Highland Heart. You are no longer bound down to the unmanly dress of the Lowlander. This is declaring to every Man, young and old, simple and gentle, that they may after this put on and wear the Truis, the Little Kilt, the Coat, and the Striped Hose, as also the Belted Plaid, without fear of the Law of the Realm or the spite of the enemies.

== See also ==
- Jacobite rising of 1745
- Highland Clearances
- Highland Potato Famine
- Scottish national identity
- Wars of Scottish Independence
