= Union with Scotland (Amendment) Act 1707 =

Act of the Parliament of Great Britain

Union with Scotland (Amendment) Act 1707 (Note: The citation of this act by this short title was authorised by section 1 of, and the first schedule to, the Short Titles Act 1896. Due to the repeal of those provisions it is now authorised by section 19(2) of the Interpretation Act 1978.)
- Act of Parliament
- Parliament of Great Britain
- Long title: An Act for rendring the Union of the Two Kingdoms more intire and complete.
- Citation: 6 Ann. c. 40 (Note: This is the citation in The Statutes of the Realm); 6 Ann. c. 6 (Note: This is the citation in The Statutes at Large)
- Territorial extent: England and Wales; Scotland; (Note: Preamble.)

Dates
- Royal assent: 13 February 1708
- Commencement: 23 October 1707 (Note: Start of session.)

Other legislation
- Amended by: Statute Law Revision Act 1867; Circuit Courts and Criminal Procedure (Scotland) Act 1925; Parliament (Elections and Meeting) Act 1943; Representation of the People Act 1949
- Relates to: Acts of Union 1707

Status: Amended

Text of statute as originally enacted

Revised text of statute as amended

Text of the Union with Scotland (Amendment) Act 1707 as in force today (including any amendments) within the United Kingdom, from legislation.gov.uk.

The Union with Scotland (Amendment) Act 1707 (6 Ann. . c. 40) is an act of the Parliament of Great Britain. It is chapter VI in the common printed editions.

As of 2026, the act is partly in force in Great Britain.

It united the English and Scottish Privy Councils and decentralised Scottish administration by appointing justices of the peace in each shire to carry out administration. In effect it took the day-to-day government of Scotland out of the hands of politicians and into those of the College of Justice.

== Subsequent developments ==
Section 5 from " and the said several Sheriffs " to end of that section, and section 6, of the act was repealed by section 1 of, and the schedule to, the Statute Law Revision Act 1867 (30 & 31 Vict. c. 59), which came into force on 15 July 1867.

Section 4 of the act was repealed by section 4 of, and the schedule to, the Circuit Courts and Criminal Procedure (Scotland) Act 1925 (15 & 16 Geo. 5. c. 81), which came into force on 22 December 1925.

Section 5 of the act was repealed by section 175(1) of, and the ninth schedule to, the Representation of the People Act 1949 (12, 13 & 14 Geo. 6. c. 68), which came into force on 3 April 1950.

== See also ==
- Acts of Union 1707
