= Circuit Courts and Criminal Procedure (Scotland) Act 1925 =

Act of the Parliament of the United Kingdom

Circuit Courts and Criminal Procedure (Scotland) Act 1925 (Note: Section 5.)
- Act of Parliament
- Parliament of the United Kingdom
- Long title: An Act to consolidate and regulate the law regarding the circuits of the High Court of Justiciary and the holding of circuit courts, and to amend the law relating to criminal procedure in Scotland in certain respects.
- Citation: 15 & 16 Geo. 5. c. 81
- Territorial extent: United Kingdom

Dates
- Royal assent: 22 December 1925
- Commencement: 22 December 1925 (Note: The Acts of Parliament (Commencement) Act 1793.)
- Repealed: 16 May 1975

Other legislation
- Amends: Criminal Procedure (Scotland) Act 1887; See § Repealed enactments
- Repeals/revokes: See § Repealed enactments
- Repealed by: Criminal Procedure (Scotland) Act 1975

Status: Repealed

Text of statute as originally enacted

The Circuit Courts and Criminal Procedure (Scotland) Act 1925 (15 & 16 Geo. 5. c. 81) was an act of the Parliament of the United Kingdom that consolidated the law regarding the circuits of the High Court of Justiciary and amended criminal procedure in Scotland.

== Provisions ==
=== Repealed enactments ===
Section 4 of the act repealed 7 enactments, listed in the schedule to the act.

| Citation | Short title | Description | Extent of repeal |
|---|---|---|---|
| 6 Ann. c. 40 | Union with Scotland (Amendment) Act 1707 | The Union with Scotland (Amendment) Act, 1707. | Section four. |
| 20 Geo. 2. c. 43 | Heritable Jurisdictions (Scotland) Act 1746 | The Heritable Jurisdiction (Scotland) Act, 1746. | Section thirty-one, in section thirty-three from the words " or of such other circuit " to the words " hereinafter mentioned " and from the words " and that the burgh of Inveraray " to the end of the section. Section thirty-nine. Section forty, from the beginning to the words " hereinbefore made." |
| 21 Geo. 2. c. 19 | Sheriffs (Scotland) Act 1747 | The Sheriffs (Scotland) Act, 1747. | Section thirteen. |
| 9 Geo. 4. c. 29 | Circuit Courts (Scotland) Act 1828 | The Circuit Courts (Scotland) Act, 1828. | Sections one, three, and four |
| 11 Geo. 4 & 1 Will. 4. c. 37 | Criminal Law (Scotland) Act 1830 | The Criminal Law (Scotland) Act, 1830. | Section three. |
| 39 & 40 Vict. c. clii (Note: Incorrectly cited as 39 & 40 Vict. c. cliii.) | N/A | (Local Act). An Act to alter the Justiciary District of the County of Peebles. | Section one. |
| 50 & 51 Vict. c. 35 | Criminal Procedure (Scotland) Act 1887 | The Criminal Procedure (Scotland) Act, 1887. | In section forty-six from the beginning of the section down to the words " shall be a sitting of the High Court of Justiciary and ". In section fifty the words " presented within three days immediately succeeding the first diet." Section fifty-four. Schedule P. |

== Subsequent developments ==
The whole act was repealed by section 461(2) of, and part I of schedule 10 to, the Criminal Procedure (Scotland) Act 1975, which came into force on 16 May 1975.
