= List of acts of the Parliament of the United Kingdom from 1925 =

This is a complete list of acts of the Parliament of the United Kingdom for the year 1925.

Note that the first parliament of the United Kingdom was held in 1801; parliaments between 1707 and 1800 were either parliaments of Great Britain or of Ireland). For acts passed up until 1707, see the list of acts of the Parliament of England and the list of acts of the Parliament of Scotland. For acts passed from 1707 to 1800, see the list of acts of the Parliament of Great Britain. See also the list of acts of the Parliament of Ireland.

For acts of the devolved parliaments and assemblies in the United Kingdom, see the list of acts of the Scottish Parliament, the list of acts of the Northern Ireland Assembly, and the list of acts and measures of Senedd Cymru; see also the list of acts of the Parliament of Northern Ireland.

The number shown after each act's title is its chapter number. Acts passed before 1963 are cited using this number, preceded by the year(s) of the reign during which the relevant parliamentary session was held; thus the Union with Ireland Act 1800 is cited as "39 & 40 Geo. 3 c. 67", meaning the 67th act passed during the session that started in the 39th year of the reign of George III and which finished in the 40th year of that reign. Note that the modern convention is to use Arabic numerals in citations (thus "41 Geo. 3" rather than "41 Geo. III"). Acts of the last session of the Parliament of Great Britain and the first session of the Parliament of the United Kingdom are both cited as "41 Geo. 3". Acts passed from 1963 onwards are simply cited by calendar year and chapter number.

== 15 & 16 Geo. 5 ==
Continuing the first session of the 34th Parliament of the United Kingdom, which met from 2 December 1924 until 22 December 1925.

This session was also traditionally cited as 15 & 16 G. 5.

=== Public general acts ===
Short title	Citation	Royal assent
Long title
War Charges (Validity) Act 1925 (repealed)	15 & 16 Geo. 5. c. 6	5 March 1925
An Act to make valid certain charges imposed and levies made during the late War. (Repealed by Statute Law Revision Act 1953 (2 & 3 Eliz. 2. c. 5))
William Preston Indemnity Act 1925 (repealed)	15 & 16 Geo. 5. c. 7	5 March 1925
An Act to indemnify and relieve William Preston, Esquire, from any penal consequences which he may have incurred or suffered by sitting or voting as a member of the House of Commons during a time when he was executing, holding or enjoying a contract, agreement or commission made or entered into with the Postmaster-General, and for purposes incidental thereto. (Repealed by Statute Law Revision Act 1950 (14 Geo. 6. c. 6))
Consolidated Fund (No. 1) Act 1925 (repealed)	15 & 16 Geo. 5. c. 8	27 March 1925
An Act to apply certain sums out of the Consolidated Fund to the service of the years ending on the thirty-first day of March, one thousand nine hundred and twenty-five, and one thousand nine hundred and twenty-six. (Repealed by Statute Law Revision Act 1950 (14 Geo. 6. c. 6))
Anglo-Italian Treaty (East African Territories) Act 1925 (repealed)	15 & 16 Geo. 5. c. 9	27 March 1925
An Act to approve a Treaty between His Majesty and the King of Italy. (Repealed by Statute Law (Repeals) Act 1973 (c. 39))
Agricultural Rates (Additional Grant) Continuance Act 1925 (repealed)	15 & 16 Geo. 5. c. 10	27 March 1925
An Act to continue in force for one year the Agricultural Rates Act, 1923, (Note: Agricultural Rates Act 1923 (13 & 14 Geo. 5. c. 39)) to continue for so long as the said Act remains in force the charge on the Consolidated Fund of the additional annual grants payable thereunder, and to amend the said Act in its application to the Isles of Scilly. (Repealed by Local Government Act 1929 (19 & 20 Geo. 5. c. 17) and Local Government (Scotland) Act 1929 (19 & 20 Geo. 5. c. 25))
Borough Councillors (Alteration of Number) Act 1925 (repealed)	15 & 16 Geo. 5. c. 11	27 March 1925
An Act to make provision with respect to the number of councillors of boroughs, and metropolitan boroughs, and matters incidental thereto. (Repealed by Local Government Act 1933 (23 & 24 Geo. 5. c. 51) and London Government Act 1939 (2 & 3 Geo. 6. c. 40))
British Sugar (Subsidy) Act 1925 (repealed)	15 & 16 Geo. 5. c. 12	27 March 1925
An Act to provide for the payment of a subsidy in respect of sugar and molasses manufactured in Great Britain during a period of ten years beginning on the first day of October, nineteen hundred and twenty-four, from beet grown in Great Britain, and to charge a duty of excise on sugar and molasses manufactured in Great Britain and Northern Ireland from beet grown in those countries. (Repealed by Statute Law Revision Act 1950 (14 Geo. 6. c. 6))
Trade Facilities Act 1925 (repealed)	15 & 16 Geo. 5. c. 13	27 March 1925
An Act to amend the Trade Facilities Acts, 1921 to 1924, by increasing the maximum limit of the loans in respect of which guarantees may be given under those Acts and by extending the period within which such guarantees may be given. (Repealed by Statute Law Revision Act 1950 (14 Geo. 6. c. 6))
Housing Act 1925 (repealed)	15 & 16 Geo. 5. c. 14	9 April 1925
An Act to consolidate the enactments relating to the Housing of the Working Classes in England and Wales. (Repealed by Housing Act 1936 (26 Geo. 5 & 1 Edw. 8. c. 51))
Housing (Scotland) Act 1925 (repealed)	15 & 16 Geo. 5. c. 15	9 April 1925
An Act to consolidate the enactments relating to the Housing of the Working Classes in Scotland. (Repealed by Housing (Scotland) Act 1950 (14 Geo. 6. c. 34))
Town Planning Act 1925 (repealed)	15 & 16 Geo. 5. c. 16	9 April 1925
An Act to consolidate the enactments relating to town planning in England and Wales. (Repealed by Town and Country Planning Act 1932 (22 & 23 Geo. 5. c. 48))
Town Planning (Scotland) Act 1925 (repealed)	15 & 16 Geo. 5. c. 17	9 April 1925
An Act to consolidate the enactments relating to town planning in Scotland. (Repealed by Town and Country Planning (Scotland) Act 1932 (22 & 23 Geo. 5. c. 49))
Settled Land Act 1925	15 & 16 Geo. 5. c. 18	9 April 1925
An Act to consolidate the enactments relating to Settled Land in England and Wales.
Trustee Act 1925	15 & 16 Geo. 5. c. 19	9 April 1925
An Act to consolidate certain enactments relating to trustees in England and Wales.
Law of Property Act 1925	15 & 16 Geo. 5. c. 20	9 April 1925
An Act to consolidate the enactments relating to Conveyancing and the Law of Property in England and Wales.
Land Registration Act 1925 (repealed)	15 & 16 Geo. 5. c. 21	9 April 1925
An Act to consolidate the Land Transfer Acts and the statute law relating to registered land. (Repealed by Land Registration Act 2002 (c. 9))
Land Charges Act 1925 (repealed)	15 & 16 Geo. 5. c. 22	9 April 1925
An Act to consolidate the enactments relating to the registration of pending actions, annuities, writs, orders, deeds of arrangement and land charges, and to searches. (Repealed by Local Land Charges Act 1975 (c. 76))
Administration of Estates Act 1925	15 & 16 Geo. 5. c. 23	9 April 1925
An Act to consolidate Enactments relating to the Administration of the Estates of Deceased Persons.
Universities and College Estates Act 1925	15 & 16 Geo. 5. c. 24	9 April 1925
An Act to consolidate the Universities and College Estates Acts, 1858 to 1898, and enactments amending those Acts.
Army and Air Force (Annual) Act 1925 (repealed)	15 & 16 Geo. 5. c. 25	29 April 1925
An Act to provide, during Twelve Months, for the Discipline and Regulation of the Army and Air Force. (Repealed by Army and Air Force (Annual) Act 1932 (22 & 23 Geo. 5. c. 22), Statute Law Revision Act 1950 (14 Geo. 6. c. 6), Statute Law Revision Act 1953 (2 & 3 Eliz. 2. c. 5) and Revision of the Army and Air Force Acts (Transitional Provisions) Act 1955 (3 & 4 Eliz. 2. c. 20))
British Empire Exhibition (Guarantee) Act 1925 (repealed)	15 & 16 Geo. 5. c. 26	7 May 1925
An Act to amend the British Empire Exhibition (Guarantee) Act, 1920, (Note: British Empire Exhibition (Guarantee) Act 1920 (10 & 11 Geo. 5. c. 74)) and the British Empire Exhibition (Amendment) Act, 1922, (Note: British Empire Exhibition (Amendment) Act 1922 (12 & 13 Geo. 5. c. 25)) by increasing to one million one hundred thousand pounds the amount up to which a guarantee may be given thereunder, and by extending the operation of the said Acts to any loss resulting from the holding of the British Empire Exhibition in the year nineteen hundred and twenty-five. (Repealed by Statute Law Revision Act 1950 (14 Geo. 6. c. 6))
Charitable Trusts Act 1925 (repealed)	15 & 16 Geo. 5. c. 27	7 May 1925
An Act to amend the Charitable Trusts Acts, 1853 to 1914. (Repealed by Charities Act 1960 (8 & 9 Eliz. 2. c. 58))
Administration of Justice Act 1925	15 & 16 Geo. 5. c. 28	7 May 1925
An Act to amend the law with respect to the jurisdiction and business of the Supreme Court in England and with respect to the judges, officers and offices thereof and otherwise with respect to the administration of justice.
Gold Standard Act 1925 (repealed)	15 & 16 Geo. 5. c. 29	13 May 1925
An Act to facilitate the return to a gold standard and for purposes connected therewith. (Repealed by Statute Law (Repeals) Act 1986 (c. 12))
Importation of Pedigree Animals Act 1925 (repealed)	15 & 16 Geo. 5. c. 30	28 May 1925
An Act to amend the law with respect to the landing in Great Britain of pedigree animals brought from His Majesty's dominions. (Repealed by Diseases of Animals Act 1950 (14 Geo. 6. c. 36))
Protection of Birds Act 1925 (repealed)	15 & 16 Geo. 5. c. 31	28 May 1925
An Act to provide for the further protection of birds. (Repealed by Protection of Birds Act 1954 (2 & 3 Eliz. 2. c. 30))
Rent and Mortgage Interest (Restrictions Continuation) Act 1925 (repealed)	15 & 16 Geo. 5. c. 32	28 May 1925
An Act to prolong the duration of the Increase of Rent and Mortgage Interest (Restrictions) Act, 1920, (Note: Increase of Rent and Mortgage Interest (Restrictions) Act 1920 (10 & 11 Geo. 5. c. 17)) as amended by any subsequent enactment, and to postpone the date of expiry of Part II. of the Rent and Mortgage Interest Restrictions Act, 1923, (Note: Rent and Mortgage Interest Restrictions Act 1923 (13 & 14 Geo. 5. c. 32)) and for purposes consequential thereon. (Repealed for England and Wales by Rent Act 1968 (c. 23) and for Scotland by Rent (Scotland) Act 1971 (c. 28))
Church of Scotland (Property and Endowments) Act 1925	15 & 16 Geo. 5. c. 33	28 May 1925
An Act to amend the law relating to Teinds and to the Stipends of Ministers of the Church of Scotland, and the tenure of the Property and Endowments of that Church, and for purposes connected therewith.
Northern Ireland Land Act 1925	15 & 16 Geo. 5. c. 34	28 May 1925
An Act to amend the Law relating to the Occupation and Ownership of Land in Northern Ireland; and for other purposes relating thereto.
Poor Law Emergency Provisions Continuance (Scotland) Act 1925 (repealed)	15 & 16 Geo. 5. c. 35	28 May 1925
An Act to extend further the duration of the Poor Law Emergency Provisions (Scotland) Act, 1921, (Note: Poor Law Emergency Provisions (Scotland) Act 1921 (11 & 12 Geo. 5. c. 64)) and to amend certain provisions of that Act as amended by the Local Authorities (Emergency Provisions) Act, 1923, (Note: Local Authorities (Emergency Provisions) Act 1923 (13 & 14 Geo. 5. c. 6)) and the Poor Law Emergency Provisions Continuance (Scotland) Act, 1924. (Note: Poor Law Emergency Provisions Continuance (Scotland) Act 1924 (14 & 15 Geo. 5. c. 9)) (Repealed by National Assistance Act 1948 (11 & 12 Geo. 6. c. 29))
Finance Act 1925	15 & 16 Geo. 5. c. 36	30 June 1925
An Act to grant certain Duties of Customs and Inland Revenue (including Excise), to alter other Duties, and to amend the law relating to Customs and Inland Revenue (including Excise) and the National Debt, and to make further provision in connection with Finance.
Merchant Shipping (Equivalent Provisions) Act 1925 (repealed)	15 & 16 Geo. 5. c. 37	30 June 1925
An Act to provide for the exemption, in certain circumstances, of Foreign ships and British ships registered outside the United Kingdom from certain provisions of the Merchant Shipping Acts. (Repealed by Merchant Shipping (Registration, etc.) Act 1993 (c. 22))
Performing Animals (Regulation) Act 1925	15 & 16 Geo. 5. c. 38	30 June 1925
An Act to regulate the Exhibition and Training of Performing Animals.
Agricultural Returns Act 1925 (repealed)	15 & 16 Geo. 5. c. 39	30 June 1925
An Act to facilitate the preparation of Agricultural Statistics. (Repealed by Agriculture Act 1947 (10 & 11 Geo. 6. c. 48))
Valuation (Metropolis) Amendment Act 1925 (repealed)	15 & 16 Geo. 5. c. 40	30 June 1925
An Act to amend the Third Schedule to the Valuation (Metropolis) Act, 1869, (Note: Valuation (Metropolis) Act 1869 (32 & 33 Vict. c. 67)) in relation to the making and revision of the valuation list which will come into force on the sixth day of April, nineteen hundred and twenty-six. (Repealed by Rating and Valuation (Miscellaneous Provisions) Act 1955 (4 & 5 Eliz. 2. c. 9))
China Indemnity (Application) Act 1925 (repealed)	15 & 16 Geo. 5. c. 41	30 June 1925
An Act to make further provision for the application of money paid on account of the China Indemnity. (Repealed by China Indemnity (Application) Act 1931 (21 & 22 Geo. 5. c. 7))
Merchant Shipping (International Labour Conventions) Act 1925 (repealed)	15 & 16 Geo. 5. c. 42	31 July 1925
An Act to give effect to certain Draft Conventions adopted by the International Labour Conference relating respectively to an unemployment indemnity for seamen in the case of loss or foundering of their ship, the minimum age for the admission of young persons to employment as trimmers and stokers, and the compulsory medical examination of children and young persons employed at sea. (Repealed by Merchant Shipping Act 1970 (c. 36))
Former Enemy Aliens (Disabilities Removal) Act 1925 (repealed)	15 & 16 Geo. 5. c. 43	31 July 1925
An Act to repeal certain enactments imposing disabilities on former enemy aliens. (Repealed by Statute Law Revision Act 1958 (6 & 7 Eliz. 2. c. 46))
Statutory Gas Companies (Electricity Supply Powers) Act 1925 (repealed)	15 & 16 Geo. 5. c. 44	31 July 1925
An Act to facilitate the supply of electricity by statutory gas companies. (Repealed by Electricity Act 1947 (10 & 11 Geo. 6. c. 54))
Guardianship of Infants Act 1925 (repealed)	15 & 16 Geo. 5. c. 45	31 July 1925
An Act to amend the Law with respect to the Guardianship, Custody and Marriage of Infants. (Repealed for England and Wales by Guardianship of Minors Act 1971 (c. 3) and for Scotland by Law Reform (Parent and Child) (Scotland) Act 1986 (c. 9))
Dramatic and Musical Performers' Protection Act 1925 (repealed)	15 & 16 Geo. 5. c. 46	31 July 1925
An Act to prevent unauthorised reproductions of dramatic and musical performances. (Repealed by Dramatic and Musical Performers' Protection Act 1958 (6 & 7 Eliz. 2. c. 44))
Fire Brigade Pensions Act 1925 (repealed)	15 & 16 Geo. 5. c. 47	31 July 1925
An Act to make provision respecting the retirement, pensions, allowances and gratuities of professional firemen who are members of fire brigades in Great Britain, and their widows, children and dependants. (Repealed by Fire Services Act 1947 (10 & 11 Geo. 6. c. 41))
Improvement of Land Act (1899) Amendment Act 1925 (repealed)	15 & 16 Geo. 5. c. 48	31 July 1925
An Act to amend the Improvement of Land Act, 1899. (Note: Improvement of Land Act 1899 (62 & 63 Vict. c. 46)) (Repealed by Statute Law (Repeals) Act 1974 (c. 22))
Supreme Court of Judicature (Consolidation) Act 1925 (repealed)	15 & 16 Geo. 5. c. 49	31 July 1925
An Act to consolidate the Judicature Acts, 1873 to 1910, and other enactments relating to the Supreme Court of Judicature in England and the administration of justice therein. (Repealed by Senior Courts Act 1981 (c. 54))
Theatrical Employers Registration Act 1925 (repealed)	15 & 16 Geo. 5. c. 50	31 July 1925
An Act to provide for the Registration of Employers of Theatrical Employees and for purposes incidental thereto. (Repealed by Local Government (Miscellaneous Provisions) Act 1982 (c. 30))
Summary Jurisdiction (Separation and Maintenance) Act 1925 (repealed)	15 & 16 Geo. 5. c. 51	31 July 1925
An Act to amend the Law relating to Separation and Maintenance Orders. (Repealed by Matrimonial Proceedings (Magistrates' Courts) Act 1960 (8 & 9 Eliz. 2. c. 48))
Advertisements Regulation Act 1925 (repealed)	15 & 16 Geo. 5. c. 52	31 July 1925
An Act to amend the law with respect to the regulation of Advertisements. (Repealed for England and Wales by Town and Country Planning Act 1947 (10 & 11 Geo. 6. c. 51) and for Scotland by Town and Country Planning (Scotland) Act 1947 (10 & 11 Geo. 6. c. 53))
Mental Deficiency (Amendment) Act 1925 (repealed)	15 & 16 Geo. 5. c. 53	31 July 1925
An Act to amend section seven of the Mental Deficiency Act, 1913, (Note: Mental Deficiency Act 1913 (3 & 4 Geo. 5. c. 28)) for the purpose of enabling a defective to be removed from an institution for the purpose of being placed under guardianship. (Repealed by Mental Health Act 1959 (7 & 8 Eliz. 2. c. 72))
Ministers of Religion (Removal of Disqualifications) Act 1925 (repealed)	15 & 16 Geo. 5. c. 54	31 July 1925
An Act to remove the disqualification of ministers of religion for being borough councillors. (Repealed by Local Government Act 1933 (23 & 24 Geo. 5. c. 51))
Education (Scotland) (Superannuation) Act 1925 (repealed)	15 & 16 Geo. 5. c. 55	31 July 1925
An Act to make further provision with regard to the grant of superannuation and other allowances to teachers in Scotland and to their legal personal representatives, and to the payment of contributions towards the cost of such allowances. (Repealed by Teachers (Superannuation) Act 1937 (1 Edw. 8 & 1 Geo. 6. c. 47) (Note: Incorrectly cited as "1936 c 47" in the Chronological Table of the Statutes.), Education (Scotland) Act 1945 (8 & 9 Geo. 6. c. 37) and Education (Scotland) Act 1946 (9 & 10 Geo. 6. c. 72))
Isle of Man (Customs) Act 1925 (repealed)	15 & 16 Geo. 5. c. 56	31 July 1925
An Act to amend the law with respect to Customs in the Isle of Man. (Repealed for the Isle of Man by the Customs and Excise etc. Order 1976 (GC No 1/76))
Appropriation Act 1925 (repealed)	15 & 16 Geo. 5. c. 57	7 August 1925
An Act to apply a sum out of the Consolidated Fund to the service of the year ending on the thirty-first day of March, one thousand nine hundred and twenty-six, and to appropriate the Supplies granted in this Session of Parliament. (Repealed by Statute Law Revision Act 1950 (14 Geo. 6. c. 6))
Greenwich Hospital (Disused Burial Ground) Act 1925 (repealed)	15 & 16 Geo. 5. c. 58	7 August 1925
An Act to authorise buildings to be erected on a disused burial ground forming part of Greenwich Hospital. (Repealed by Statute Law (Repeals) Act 1995 (c. 44))
Teachers (Superannuation) Act 1925 (repealed)	15 & 16 Geo. 5. c. 59	7 August 1925
An Act to make provision with respect to the grant of superannuation allowances and gratuities to teachers and to persons employed in the control or supervision of teachers and to their legal personal representatives and to amend the Elementary School Teachers (Superannuation) Act, 1898, (Note: Elementary School Teachers (Superannuation) Act 1898 (61 & 62 Vict. c. 57)) and the School Teachers (Superannuation) Acts, 1918 to 1924. (Repealed by Teachers (Superannuation) Act 1937 (1 Edw. 8 & 1 Geo. 6. c. 47), Statute Law Revision Act 1950 (14 Geo. 6. c. 6), Teachers' Superannuation Act 1965 (c. 83) and Teachers' Superannuation Act 1967 (c. 12))
Therapeutic Substances Act 1925 (repealed)	15 & 16 Geo. 5. c. 60	7 August 1925
An Act to provide for the regulation of the manufacture, sale, and importation of vaccines, sera, and other therapeutic substances. (Repealed by Therapeutic Substances Act 1956 (4 & 5 Eliz. 2. c. 25))
Allotments Act 1925	15 & 16 Geo. 5. c. 61	7 August 1925
An Act to facilitate the acquisition and maintenance of allotments, and to make further provision for the security of tenure of tenants of allotments.
Public Works Loans Act 1925 (repealed)	15 & 16 Geo. 5. c. 62	7 August 1925
An Act to grant money for the purpose of certain Local Loans out of the Local Loans Fund, and for other purposes relating to Local Loans. (Repealed by Statute Law Revision Act 1950 (14 Geo. 6. c. 6))
Diseases of Animals Act 1925 (repealed)	15 & 16 Geo. 5. c. 63	7 August 1925
An Act to provide for contributions out of moneys provided by Parliament towards the compensation payable by local authorities for the slaughter of cattle in accordance with orders made under the Diseases of Animals Act, 1894, (Note: Diseases of Animals Act 1894 (57 & 58 Vict. c. 57)) in case of the existence or suspected existence of tuberculosis. (Repealed by Agriculture Act 1937 (1 Edw. 8 & 1 Geo. 6. c. 70) and Statute Law Revision Act 1950 (14 Geo. 6. c. 6))
Summer Time Act 1925 (repealed)	15 & 16 Geo. 5. c. 64	7 August 1925
An Act to provide for the permanent adoption of summer time. (Repealed by Summer Time Act 1972 (c. 6))
Telegraph (Money) Act 1925 (repealed)	15 & 16 Geo. 5. c. 65	7 August 1925
An Act to provide for raising further Money for the purpose of the Telegraph Acts, 1863 to 1924. (Repealed by Statute Law Revision Act 1953 (2 & 3 Eliz. 2. c. 5))
Seeds (Amendment) Act 1925 (repealed)	15 & 16 Geo. 5. c. 66	7 August 1925
An Act to amend the Seeds Act, 1920. (Note: Seeds Act 1920 (10 & 11 Geo. 5. c. 54)) (Repealed by Plant Varieties and Seeds Act 1964 (c. 14))
Wireless Telegraphy (Explanation) Act 1925 (repealed)	15 & 16 Geo. 5. c. 67	7 August 1925
An Act to explain the meaning of the expressions "transmission" and "rent or royalty" where used in certain provisions of the Wireless Telegraphy Act, 1904. (Note: Wireless Telegraphy Act 1904 (4 Edw. 7. c. 24)) (Repealed by Statute Law (Repeals) Act 1973 (c. 39))
Roads Improvement Act 1925 (repealed)	15 & 16 Geo. 5. c. 68	7 August 1925
An Act to make further provision for the improvement of roads, including the prescription of building lines, and for purposes connected therewith. (Repealed for England and Wales by Highways Act 1959 (7 & 8 Eliz. 2. c. 25) and London Government Act 1963 (c. 33) and for Scotland by Roads (Scotland) Act 1984 (c. 54))
Unemployment Insurance Act 1925 (repealed)	15 & 16 Geo. 5. c. 69	7 August 1925
An Act to amend subsection (3) of section one and subsection (2) of section three of the Unemployment Insurance (No. 2) Act, 1924, (Note: Unemployment Insurance (No. 2) Act 1924 (14 & 15 Geo. 5. c. 30)) to amend the law with respect to the period on the expiration of which benefit under the Acts relating to unemployment insurance becomes payable and with respect to the rates of contribution under the said Acts, and to continue the saying contained in subsection (1) of section eleven of the Unemployment Insurance Act, 1923. (Note: Unemployment Insurance Act 1923 (13 & 14 Geo. 5. c. 2)) (Repealed by Unemployment Insurance Act 1935 (25 & 26 Geo. 5. c. 8))
Widows', Orphans' and Old Age Contributory Pensions Act 1925 (repealed)	15 & 16 Geo. 5. c. 70	7 August 1925
An Act to make provision for pensions for widows, orphans, and persons between the ages of sixty-five and seventy, and for the payment of contributions in respect thereof; and to amend the enactments relating to health and unemployment insurance and old age pensions. (Repealed by National Health Insurance Act 1936 (26 Geo. 5 & 1 Edw. 8. c. 32) and Widows', Orphans' and Old Age Contributory Pensions Act 1936 (26 Geo. 5 & 1 Edw. 8. c. 33))
Public Health Act 1925	15 & 16 Geo. 5. c. 71	7 August 1925
An Act to amend the Public Health Acts, 1875 to 1907, and the Baths and Washhouses Acts, 1846 to 1899, in respect of matters for which provision is commonly made in local Acts and for other purposes relating to the public health.
Honours (Prevention of Abuses) Act 1925	15 & 16 Geo. 5. c. 72	7 August 1925
An Act for the prevention of abuses in connection with the Grant of Honours.
National Library of Scotland Act 1925 (repealed)	15 & 16 Geo. 5. c. 73	7 August 1925
An Act to establish a National Library in Scotland on the foundation of the Library gifted for that purpose by the Faculty of Advocates, and for purposes connected therewith. (Repealed by National Library of Scotland Act 2012 (asp 3))
Dangerous Drugs Act 1925 (repealed)	15 & 16 Geo. 5. c. 74	7 August 1925
An Act to amend the Dangerous Drugs Acts, 1920 (Note: Dangerous Drugs Act 1920 (10 & 11 Geo. 5. c. 46)) and 1923, (Note: Dangerous Drugs and Poisons (Amendment) Act 1923 (13 & 14 Geo. 5. c. 5)) so far as is necessary to enable effect to be given to a Convention signed at Geneva on behalf of His Majesty on the nineteenth day of February, nineteen hundred and twenty-five. (Repealed by Dangerous Drugs Act 1951 (14 & 15 Geo. 6. c. 48))
Public Health (Scotland) Amendment Act 1925 (repealed)	15 & 16 Geo. 5. c. 75	10 December 1925
An Act to authorise local authorities under the Public Health (Scotland) Act, 1897, (Note: Public Health (Scotland) Act 1897 (60 & 61 Vict. c. 38)) to make arrangements for providing medicines and treatment to persons suffering from diabetes, and for purposes connected therewith. (Repealed by National Health Service (Scotland) Act 1947 (10 & 11 Geo. 6. c. 27))
Expiring Laws Act 1925 (repealed)	15 & 16 Geo. 5. c. 76	10 December 1925
An Act to deal with certain Expiring Laws by making some of them permanent, continuing some of them permanently, and continuing the remainder for a limited period. (Repealed by Statute Law (Repeals) Act 1977 (c. 18))
Ireland (Confirmation of Agreement) Act 1925 (repealed)	15 & 16 Geo. 5. c. 77	10 December 1925
An Act to confirm and give effect to a certain Agreement amending and supplementing the Articles of Agreement for a Treaty between Great Britain and Ireland to which the force of law was given by the Irish Free State (Agreement) Act, 1922, (Note: Irish Free State (Agreement) Act 1922 (12 & 13 Geo. 5. c. 4)) and by the Constitution of the Irish Free State (Saorstat Eireann) Act, 1922. (Note: Constitution of the Irish Free State (Saorstát Eireann) Act 1922 (No. 1)) (Repealed by Statute Law (Repeals) Act 1989 (c. 43))
Appropriation (No. 2) Act 1925 (repealed)	15 & 16 Geo. 5. c. 78	22 December 1925
An Act to apply a sum out of the Consolidated Fund to the service of the year ending on the thirty-first day of March, one thousand nine hundred and twenty-six, and to appropriate the further Supplies granted in this Session of Parliament. (Repealed by Statute Law Revision Act 1950 (14 Geo. 6. c. 6))
Safeguarding of Industries (Customs Duties) Act 1925 (repealed)	15 & 16 Geo. 5. c. 79	22 December 1925
An Act to impose customs duties on certain goods with a view to the safeguarding of certain industries, and for purposes connected therewith. (Repealed by Statute Law Revision Act 1950 (14 Geo. 6. c. 6))
Mining Industry (Welfare Fund) Act 1925 (repealed)	15 & 16 Geo. 5. c. 80	22 December 1925
An Act to extend the period during which payments are to be made to the fund constituted under section twenty of the Mining Industry Act, 1920, (Note: Mining Industry Act 1920 (10 & 11 Geo. 5. c. 50)) and to increase the number of the committee appointed thereunder. (Repealed by Mining Industry (Welfare Fund) Act 1939 (2 & 3 Geo. 6. c. 9))
Circuit Courts and Criminal Procedure (Scotland) Act 1925 (repealed)	15 & 16 Geo. 5. c. 81	22 December 1925
An Act to consolidate and regulate the law regarding the circuits of the High Court of Justiciary and the holding of circuit courts, and to amend the law relating to criminal procedure in Scotland in certain respects. (Repealed by Criminal Procedure (Scotland) Act 1975 (c. 21))
Roads and Streets in Police Burghs (Scotland) Act 1925 (repealed)	15 & 16 Geo. 5. c. 82	22 December 1925
An Act to provide for the redemption of annual sums payable in respect of transfers of highways in police burghs under the Roads and Streets in Police Burghs (Scotland) Act, 1891, (Note: Police Burghs (Scotland) Act 1891 (54 & 55 Vict. c. 32)) and for other purposes connected therewith. (Repealed by Local Government (Scotland) Act 1973 (c. 65))
Government of India (Civil Services) Act 1925 (repealed)	15 & 16 Geo. 5. c. 83	22 December 1925
An Act to amend the provisions of the Government of India Act (Note: Government of India Act 1919 (9 & 10 Geo. 5. c. 101)) by exempting proposals for expenditure upon certain salaries, pensions and other payments from submission to Indian legislatures, and to enable rules made under the said Act relating to the Civil Services of the Crown in India to be dispensed with or relaxed in certain cases. (Repealed by Government of India Act 1935 (26 Geo. 5 & 1 Edw. 8. c. 2))
Workmen's Compensation Act 1925 (repealed)	15 & 16 Geo. 5. c. 84	22 December 1925
An Act to consolidate the law relating to compensation to workmen for injuries suffered in the course of their employment. (Repealed by National Insurance (Industrial Injuries) Act 1946 (9 & 10 Geo. 6. c. 62)) and Industrial Injuries and Diseases (Old Cases) Act 1975 (c. 16))
Land Settlement (Facilities) Amendment Act 1925 (repealed)	15 & 16 Geo. 5. c. 85	22 December 1925
An Act to amend the Land Settlement (Facilities) Act, 1919, (Note: Land Settlement (Facilities) Act 1919 (9 & 10 Geo. 5. c. 59)) by substituting other provisions for those contained in section twenty-seven of the said Act. (Repealed by Statute Law (Repeals) Act 1993 (c. 50))
Criminal Justice Act 1925	15 & 16 Geo. 5. c. 86	22 December 1925
An Act to amend the law with respect to the administration of criminal justice in England, and otherwise to amend the criminal law. (Repealed for the Isle of Man by Statute Law (Repeals) Act 2004 (c. 14))
Tithe Act 1925 (repealed)	15 & 16 Geo. 5. c. 87	22 December 1925
An Act to amend the law relating to Tithe rentcharge and other rentcharges, rents and payments in lieu of Tithe, and the payment of rates thereon; and for other matters connected therewith. (Repealed by Statute Law (Repeals) Act 1998 (c. 43))
Coastguard Act 1925	15 & 16 Geo. 5. c. 88	22 December 1925
An Act to amend the law with respect to the Coastguard, and for purposes connected therewith.
Education (Scotland) Act 1925 (repealed)	15 & 16 Geo. 5. c. 89	22 December 1925
An Act to amend the Education (Scotland) Act, 1908, (Note: Education (Scotland) Act 1908 (8 Edw. 7. c. 63)) and the Education (Scotland) Act, 1918. (Note: Education (Scotland) Act 1918 (8 & 9 Geo. 5. c. 48)) (Repealed by Local Government (Scotland) Act 1947 (10 & 11 Geo. 6. c. 43))
Rating and Valuation Act 1925	15 & 16 Geo. 5. c. 90	22 December 1925
An Act to simplify and amend the law with respect to the making and collection of rates by the consolidation of rates and otherwise, to promote uniformity in the valuation of property for the purpose of rates, to amend the law with respect to the valuation of machinery and certain other classes of properties, and for other purposes incidental to or connected with the matters aforesaid.
Mines (Working Facilities and Support) Act 1925 (repealed)	15 & 16 Geo. 5. c. 91	22 December 1925
An Act to amend Part I. of the Mines (Working Facilities and Support) Act, 1923, (Note: Mines (Working Facilities and Support) Act 1923 (13 & 14 Geo. 5. c. 20)) with respect to the payment of money into Court. (Repealed by Mines (Working Facilities and Support) Act 1966 (c. 4))

=== Local acts ===
Short title	Citation	Royal assent
Long title
Buckhaven and Methil Burgh Order Confirmation Act 1925	15 & 16 Geo. 5. c. vi	5 March 1925
An Act to confirm a Provisional Order under the Private Legislation Procedure (Scotland) Act 1899 (Note: Private Legislation Procedure (Scotland) Act 1899 (62 & 63 Vict. c. 47)) relating to Buckhaven and Methil Burgh.
	Buckhaven and Methil Burgh Order 1925 Provisional Order to extend the boundaries of the burgh of Buckhaven Methil and Innerleven and for other purposes.	
Dumfries and Maxwelltown Bridge Order Confirmation Act 1925	15 & 16 Geo. 5. c. vii	5 March 1925
An Act to confirm a Provisional Order under the Private Legislation Procedure (Scotland) Act 1899 relating to Dumfries and Maxwelltown Bridge.
	Dumfries and Maxwelltown Bridge Order 1925 Provisional Order to authorise the Town Councils of Dumfries and Maxwelltown to construct a bridge over the River Nith and for other purposes.	
Dundee Corporation and Water and Gas Order Confirmation Act 1925 (repealed)	15 & 16 Geo. 5. c. viii	5 March 1925
An Act to confirm a Provisional Order under the Private Legislation Procedure (Scotland) Act 1899 relating to Dundee Corporation and Water and Gas. (Repealed by Dundee Corporation (Consolidated Powers) Order Confirmation Act 1957 (6 & 7 Eliz. 2. c. iv))
	Dundee Corporation and Water and Gas Order 1925 Provisional Order to confer further powers on the Dundee Corporation for the widening alteration and improvement of streets the construction of new tramways for the modification and partial abandonment of authorised work the extension of limits of water supply and for other purposes.	
Elizabeth Fry Refuge and Refuge for the Destitute Charities Scheme Confirmation Act 1925	15 & 16 Geo. 5. c. ix	27 March 1925
An Act to confirm a Scheme of the Charity Commissioners for the application or management of the Charities in the county of London called or known as the Elizabeth Fry Refuge and the Refuge for the Destitute.
	Scheme for the Application or Management of the following Charities in the County of London:-: 1. The Charity called or known as the Elizabeth Fry Refuge founded by Declaration of Trust dated 2nd August 1853; 2. The Charity called the Refuge for the Destitute comprised in an Act of Parliament passed in the 1st year of the reign of Queen Victoria intituled "An Act to incorporate the Subscribers to the Institution called 'the Refuge for the Destitute' and for the better enabling them to carry on their Charitable Designs." (Note: Refuge for the Destitute Act 1838 (1 & 2 Vict. c. lxxi))	
Westlothian (Bathgate District) Water Order Confirmation Act 1925	15 & 16 Geo. 5. c. x	27 March 1925
An Act to confirm a Provisional Order under the Private Legislation Procedure (Scotland) Act 1899 relating to Westlothian (Bathgate District) Water.
	Westlothian (Bathgate District) Water Order 1925 Provisional Order to extend the municipal and police boundaries of the Burgh of Hamilton in the County of Lanark to apply to the extended Burgh the provisions of the Local Acts and Orders relating to the existing Burgh and to make other provisions in relation thereto to enable the Corporation of the Burgh to borrow further money for the purposes of their Gas Undertaking and for other purposes.	
Bradford Corporation (Trolley Vehicles) Order Confirmation Act 1925 (repealed)	15 & 16 Geo. 5. c. xi	27 March 1925
An Act to confirm a Provisional Order made by the Minister of Transport under the Bradford Corporation Act 1910 (Note: Bradford Corporation Act 1910 (10 Edw. 7 & 1 Geo. 5. c. cxvii)) relating to Bradford Corporation trolley vehicles. (Repealed by West Yorkshire Act 1980 (c. xiv))
	Bradford Corporation (Trolley Vehicles) Order 1925 Order authorising the lord mayor aldermen and citizens of the city of Bradford to provide maintain and use trolley vehicles upon additional routes in and beyond the said city.	
Ministry of Health Provisional Order Confirmation (Blackpool Order) Act 1925 (repealed)	15 & 16 Geo. 5. c. xii	27 March 1925
An Act to confirm a Provisional Order of the Minister of Health relating to Blackpool. (Repealed by County of Lancashire Act 1984 (c. xxi))
	Blackpool Order (No. 2) 1924 (Note: Although passed in 1925, the short title is specified as the Blackpool Order (No. 2) 1924.) Provisional Order to enable the Blackpool Corporation to put in force the Compulsory Clauses of the Lands Clauses Acts.	
Isle of Wight Highways Act 1925 (repealed)	15 & 16 Geo. 5. c. xiii	27 March 1925
An Act to transfer to the Council of the administrative county of the Isle of Wight the power and duty of maintaining the highways in the rural district of the Isle of Wight to make further provision in regard to the highways of the said county and for other purposes. (Repealed by Isle of Wight Act 1980 (c. xv))
Hamilton Burgh Order Confirmation Act 1925	15 & 16 Geo. 5. c. xiv	9 April 1925
An Act to confirm a Provisional Order under the Private Legislation Procedure (Scotland) Act 1899 relating to Hamilton Burgh.
	Hamilton Burgh Order 1925 Provisional Order to extend the municipal and police boundaries of the Burgh of Hamilton in the County of Lanark to apply to the extended Burgh the provisions of the Local Acts and Orders relating to the existing Burgh and to make other provisions in relation thereto to enable the Corporation of the Burgh to borrow further money for the purposes of their Gas Undertaking and for other purposes.	
Dundee Harbour and Tay Ferries Order Confirmation Act 1925 (repealed)	15 & 16 Geo. 5. c. xv	9 April 1925
An Act to confirm a Provisional Order under the Private Legislation Procedure (Scotland) Act 1899 relating to Dundee Harbour and Tay Ferries. (Repealed by Dundee Harbour and Tay Ferries Order Confirmation Act 1952 (15 & 16 Geo. 6 & 1 Eliz. 2. c. xx))
	Dundee Harbour and Tay Ferries Order 1925 Provisional Order to authorise the Trustees of the Harbour of Dundee to borrow additional money and for other purposes.	
Advocates Widows' Fund (Widowers' Provisions) Order Confirmation Act 1925 (repealed)	15 & 16 Geo. 5. c. xvi	13 May 1925
An Act to confirm a Provisional Order under the Private Legislation Procedure (Scotland) Act 1899 relating to the Advocates Widows' Fund (Widowers' Provisions). (Repealed by Advocates' Widows' and Orphans' Fund Order Confirmation Act 1968 (c. xliv))
	Advocates Widows' Fund (Widowers' Provisions) Order 1925 Provisional Order for amending and extending the Act 11 Geo. IV cap. XLI (Local) intituled "An Act to raise a Fund for Provisions to Widows of the Members of the Faculty of Advocates of Scotland" (Note: Advocates' Widows' Fund Act 1830 (11 Geo. 4 & 1 Will. 4. c. xli)) by making the said fund available for provisions to widowers of women members of the said Faculty.	
Imperial Institute Act 1925 (repealed)	15 & 16 Geo. 5. c. xvii	28 May 1925
An Act to amend the Law with respect to the Management of the Imperial Institute. (Repealed by Commonwealth Act 2002 (c. 39))
Air Ministry (Croydon Aerodrome Extension) Act 1925 or the Croydon Aerodrome Extension Act 1925	15 & 16 Geo. 5. c. xviii	28 May 1925
An Act to authorise the President of the Air Council to stop up a portion of a road known as "Plough Lane" in the urban district of Beddington and Wallington in the county of Surrey and in lieu thereof to widen an existing road and to construct a new road within the said district and to acquire such land and carry out such works as may be necessary for the purposes aforesaid and for purposes connected with the matters aforesaid.
Ministry of Health Provisional Order Confirmation (Keighley Water Charges) Act 1925 (repealed)	15 & 16 Geo. 5. c. xix	28 May 1925
An Act to confirm a Provisional Order of the Minister of Health relating to Keighley. (Repealed by West Yorkshire Act 1980 (c. xiv))
	Keighley Water (Modification of Charges) Order 1924 The Keighley Water (Modification of Charges) Order 1924 dated 8th August 1924 made by the Minister of Health under the Water Undertakings (Modification of Charges) Act 1921 (11 & 12 Geо. 5. с. 44). (Note: Water Undertakings (Modification of Charges) Act 1921 (11 & 12 Geо. 5. с. 44))	
Ministry of Health Provisional Orders Confirmation (No. 1) Act 1925	15 & 16 Geo. 5. c. xx	28 May 1925
An Act to confirm certain Provisional Orders of the Minister of Health relating to Denbigh Devon Llandudno Northampton Penrith South Molton Tredegar and East Riding of Yorkshire.
	County of Denbigh Order 1925 Provisional Order made in pursuance of Sections 69 (2) and 87 of the Local Government Act 1888. (Note: Local Government Act 1888 (51 & 52 Vict. c. 41))	
	County of Devon Order 1925 Provisional Order made in pursuance of subsection (2) of Section 69 of the Local Government Act 1888.	
	Llandudno Order 1925 Provisional Order to enable the Urban District Council of Llandudno to put in force the Compulsory Clauses of the Lands Clauses Acts.	
	Northampton Order 1925 Provisional Order for altering the Northampton Corporation Act 1882. (Note: Northampton Corporation Act 1882 (45 & 46 Vict. c. ccxii))	
	Penrith Order 1925 Provisional Order for altering the Penrith Urban District Council Act 1907. (Note: Penrith Urban District Council Act 1907 (7 Edw. 7. c. lxxxviii))	
	South Molton Order 1925 Provisional Order for partially repealing the South Molton Markets and Improvement Act 1862. (Note: South Molton Markets and Improvement Act 1862 (25 & 26 Vict. c. xxvii))	
	Tredegar Order 1925 Provisional Order for altering the Tredegar Urban District Council Act 1920. (Note: Tredegar Urban District Council Act 1920 (10 & 11 Geo. 5. c. lxxix))	
	County of the East Riding of Yorkshire Order 1925 Provisional Order made in pursuance of subsection (2) of Section 69 of the Local Government Act 1888.	
Forfar Gas Order Confirmation Act 1925	15 & 16 Geo. 5. c. xxi	28 May 1925
An Act to confirm a Provisional Order under the Private Legislation Procedure (Scotland) Act 1899 relating to Forfar Gas.
	Forfar Gas Order 1925 Provisional Order to authorise the provost magistrates and councillors of the royal burgh of Forfar to use land for the purposes of their gas undertaking to confer various further powers on them including power to borrow further moneys and for other purposes.	
Port of London Act 1925 (repealed)	15 & 16 Geo. 5. c. xxii	28 May 1925
An Act to amend certain provisions of the Port of London (Consolidation) Act 1920 (Note: Port of London (Consolidation) Act 1920 (10 & 11 Geo. 5. c. clxxiii)) relating to rates and charges. (Repealed by Port of London Act 1965 (c. vii))
South Wales Electrical Power Distribution Company Act 1925	15 & 16 Geo. 5. c. xxiii	28 May 1925
An Act to confer further powers upon the South Wales Electrical Power Distribution Company and to amend the South Wales Electrical Power Distribution Company Act 1900 (Note: South Wales Electrical Power Distribution Company Act 1900 (63 & 64 Vict. c. cclxxxii)) and for other purposes.
Great Western Railway Act 1925	15 & 16 Geo. 5. c. xxiv	28 May 1925
An Act to authorise the Great Western Railway Company to raise additional capital and for other purposes.
Aire and Calder Navigation Act 1925	15 & 16 Geo. 5. c. xxv	28 May 1925
An Act to authorise the Undertakers of the Aire and Calder Navigation to construct a diversion of the Dutch River at Goole to increase rates tolls and charges leviable by the Undertakers and to confer other powers on the Undertakers in relation to their undertaking.
Lloyd's Act 1925 (repealed)	15 & 16 Geo. 5. c. xxvi	28 May 1925
An Act to confer on Lloyd's additional powers of making byelaws and to amend Lloyd's Act 1871. (Note: Lloyd's Act 1871 (34 & 35 Vict. c. xxi)) (Repealed by Lloyd's Act 1982 (c. xiv))
Burgess Hill Water Act 1925 (repealed)	15 & 16 Geo. 5. c. xxvii	28 May 1925
An Act to authorise the Burgess Hill Water Company to acquire lands to construct new works to extend their limits for the supply of water to raise further moneys and for other purposes. (Repealed by Mid-Sussex Water Order 1985 (SI 1985/513))
Oxford Corporation Act 1925 (repealed)	15 & 16 Geo. 5. c. xxviii	28 May 1925
An Act to empower the mayor aldermen and citizens of Oxford to construct a street improvement to enlarge their powers in regard to their water undertaking and to make further and better provision for the improvement health local government and finances of the city of Oxford and for other purposes. (Repealed by Oxfordshire Act 1985 (c. xxxiv))
Bideford Harbour Act 1925	15 & 16 Geo. 5. c. xxix	30 June 1925
An Act to confer powers upon the mayor aldermen and burgesses of the borough of Bideford in respect of their harbour undertaking and for other purposes.
Kingston-upon-Hull Corporation Act 1925	15 & 16 Geo. 5. c. xxx	30 June 1925
An Act to empower the lord mayor aldermen and citizens of the city and county of Kingston upon Hull to construct a street improvement to enlarge the borrowing powers for the purposes of their water undertaking to make further provision for the prevention of floods and for other purposes.
Westminster City Council (General Powers) Act 1925	15 & 16 Geo. 5. c. xxxi	30 June 1925
An Act to make provision with regard to St. Martin's Lane Library and St. Clement Danes Vestry Hall to confer various powers upon the Westminster City Council and for other purposes.
North Metropolitan Electric Power Supply Act 1925 (repealed)	15 & 16 Geo. 5. c. xxxii	30 June 1925
An Act to extend the limits of supply of and confer further powers on the North Metropolitan Electric Power Supply Company and for other purposes. (Repealed by North Metropolitan Electric Power Supply (Consolidation) Act 1928 (18 & 19 Geo. 5. c. cxviii))
Tyne Improvement Act 1925	15 & 16 Geo. 5. c. xxxiii	30 June 1925
An Act to confer further powers on the Tyne Improvement Commissioners to amend the Acts relating to the Commissioners to make provision as to the maintenance and repair of the Swing Bridge over the Tyne and matters incidental thereto and for other purposes.
Leicester Corporation Act 1925 (repealed)	15 & 16 Geo. 5. c. xxxiv	30 June 1925
An Act to empower the mayor aldermen and citizens of the city of Leicester to execute street improvements and for other purposes. (Repealed by Leicestershire Act 1985 (c.xvii))
Gas Light and Coke Company's Act 1925	15 & 16 Geo. 5. c. xxxv	30 June 1925
An Act to provide for the transfer to the Gas Light and Coke Company of the undertaking of the Brentford Gas Company to confer various powers upon the Gas Light and Coke Company and for other purposes.
Sheffield Corporation Act 1925 (repealed)	15 & 16 Geo. 5. c. xxxvi	30 June 1925
An Act to provide for differential rating in the Sheffield Union and for other purposes. (Repealed by Statute Law (Repeals) Act 1989 (c. 43))
Ministry of Health Provisional Orders Confirmation (No. 2) Act 1925	15 & 16 Geo. 5. c. xxxvii	30 June 1925
An Act to confirm certain Provisional Orders of the Minister of Health relating to Abertillery and District Water Board Barnoldswick Eastbourne Leek Llanelly Nuneaton Paignton and Weston-super-Mare.
	Abertillery and District Water Board Order 1925 Provisional Order for altering the Abertillery and District Water Board Act 1910. (Note: Abertillery and District Water Board Act 1910 (10 Edw. 7 & 1 Geo. 5. c. cxxv))	
	Barnoldswick Order 1925 Provisional Order for amending the Barnoldswick Urban District Council Water Act 1915. (Note: Barnoldswick Urban District Council Water Act 1915 (5 & 6 Geo. 5. c. lxv))	
	Eastbourne Order 1925 Provisional Order to enable the Eastbourne Corporation to put in force the Compulsory Clauses of the Lands Clauses Acts.	
	Leek Order 1925 Provisional Order for amending a Provisional Order confirmed by Parliament.	
	Llanelly Order 1925 Provisional Order for altering the Llanelly Corporation Water Act 1920. (Note: Llanelly Corporation Water Act 1920 (10 & 11 Geo. 5. c. cxliii))	
	Nuneaton Order 1925 Provisional Order for amending the Nuneaton Corporation Act 1921. (Note: Nuneaton Corporation Act 1921 (11 & 12 Geo. 5. c. xci))	
	Paignton Order 1925 Provisional Order for altering and amending the Paignton Improvement Act 1898. (Note: Paignton Improvement Act 1898 (61 & 62 Vict. c. cclvii))	
	Weston-super-Mare Order 1925 Provisional Order for altering the Weston-super-Mare Improvement Act 1887 (Note: Weston-super-Mare Improvement Act 1887 (50 & 51 Vict. c. cvii)) and the Weston-super-Mare Urban District Council Act 1914. (Note: Weston-super-Mare Urban District Council Act 1914 (4 & 5 Geo. 5. c. clxvi))	
Kilmarnock Gas and Water Order Confirmation Act 1925	15 & 16 Geo. 5. c. xxxviii	30 June 1925
An Act to confirm a Provisional Order under the Burgh Police (Scotland) Act 1892 (Note: Burgh Police (Scotland) Act 1892 (55 & 56 Vict. c. 55)) relating to Kilmarnock Gas and Water.
	Kilmarnock Gas and Water Order 1925 Kilmarnock Gas and Water. Provisional Order.	
Provisional Order (Marriages) Confirmation Act 1925 (repealed)	15 & 16 Geo. 5. c. xxxix	30 June 1925
An Act to confirm a Provisional Order made by one of His Majesty's Principal Secretaries of State under the Marriages Validity (Provisional Orders) Acts 1905 (Note: Provisional Order (Marriages) Act 1905 (5 Edw. 7. c. 23)) and 1924. (Note: Marriages Validity (Provisional Orders) Act 1924 (14 & 15 Geo. 5. c. 20)) (Repealed by Statute Law (Repeals) Act 1977 (c. 18))
	All Saints Goulceby Order.	
St. Mildred Poultry Churchyard (Sale) Act 1925	15 & 16 Geo. 5. c. xl	31 July 1925
An Act to authorise the sale and use for building of the churchyard or burial ground of the former church of St. Mildred Poultry in the city of London and for other purposes.
Saint Mary's Church Birmingham and General Hospital Act 1925	15 & 16 Geo. 5. c. xli	31 July 1925
An Act to authorise the closing of the church of Saint Mary Birmingham and the sale of the site and churchyard thereof and the application of the proceeds of sale for church purposes the extinction of the ecclesiastical parish of Saint Mary Birmingham and the merger thereof in another parish and for other purposes.
Standard Life Assurance Company's Act 1925 (repealed)	15 & 16 Geo. 5. c. xlii	31 July 1925
An Act to re-incorporate the Standard Life Assurance Company to provide for the control and management of the Company as a mutual company and for the conversion of its share capital into perpetual stock to confer further powers on the Company to repeal existing Acts and for other purposes. (Repealed by Standard Life Assurance Company Act 1991 (c. iii))
London County Council (Tramways and Improvements) Act 1925	15 & 16 Geo. 5. c. xliii	31 July 1925
An Act to empower the London County Council to construct and work a tramway to make a new street street improvements widenings and other works and for other purposes.
Rochdale Corporation Act 1925	15 & 16 Geo. 5. c. xliv	31 July 1925
An Act to confer further powers upon the mayor aldermen and burgesses of the borough of Rochdale in connection with their several undertakings to consolidate the local rates leviable in the borough to make better provision for the health local government and finance of the borough and for other purposes.
Royal Exchange Assurance Act 1925	15 & 16 Geo. 5. c. xlv	31 July 1925
An Act to empower the Royal Exchange Assurance to create and issue debentures or debenture stock to amend the fundamental laws of the Corporation and for other purposes.
French Protestant Episcopal Church of the Savoy Act 1925 (repealed)	15 & 16 Geo. 5. c. xlvi	31 July 1925
An Act to authorise the closing of the church of the French Protestant Episcopal Church of the Savoy situate in Shaftesbury Avenue in the metropolitan borough of Holborn and the sale of the building and site thereof and to provide for the application of the proceeds of sale and for other purposes. (Repealed by Statute Law (Repeals) Act 2013 (c. 2))
Bolton Corporation Act 1925	15 & 16 Geo. 5. c. xlvii	31 July 1925
An Act to empower the mayor aldermen and burgesses of the county borough of Bolton to construct additional waterworks and execute a street improvement to confer upon them powers of running trolley vehicles to make further provision with reference to their gas undertaking and to the improvement health and good government of the borough and for other purposes.
Oakengates Urban District Council Act 1925	15 & 16 Geo. 5. c. xlviii	31 July 1925
An Act to provide for the transfer to the urban district council of Oakengates of certain waterworks of the Most Noble George Granville Duke and Earl of Sutherland (Note: George Leveson-Gower, 1st Duke of Sutherland.) and the acquisition by that Council of certain water mains in their district and adjoining areas and to authorise the Council to construct and maintain waterworks and supply water to make further provision in regard to the health and local government of the district and for other purposes.
South Metropolitan Gas Act 1925	15 & 16 Geo. 5. c. xlix	31 July 1925
An Act to allow of agreements between the South Metropolitan Gas Company and other gas undertakers for mutual assistance and for other purposes.
Southern Railway Act 1925	15 & 16 Geo. 5. c. l	31 July 1925
An Act to empower the Southern Railway Company to construct works and acquire lands to extend the time for the completion of certain works and for the compulsory purchase of certain lands to abandon certain authorised works to transfer to the said Company the undertaking of the East London Railway Company and for other purposes.
London, Midland and Scottish Railway (New Capital) Act 1925	15 & 16 Geo. 5. c. li	31 July 1925
An Act to authorise the London Midland and Scottish Railway Company to raise additional capital and for other purposes.
London and North Eastern Railway Act 1925	15 & 16 Geo. 5. c. lii	31 July 1925
An Act to empower the London and North Eastern Railway Company to construct new railways widenings and other works and to acquire lands to extend the time for the completion of certain works and for the compulsory purchase of certain lands and for other purposes.
Great Yarmouth Haven Bridge Act 1925	15 & 16 Geo. 5. c. liii	31 July 1925
An Act to authorise the construction of a new bridge over the haven of Great Yarmouth the construction of tramways and for other purposes.
Bedwellty Urban District Council Act 1925	15 & 16 Geo. 5. c. liv	31 July 1925
An Act to make further provision in regard to the water and gas undertakings of the urban district council of Bedwellty and the health local government and improvement of their district to consolidate the rates of the district and for other purposes.
Fylde Water Board Act 1925	15 & 16 Geo. 5. c. lv	31 July 1925
An Act to empower the Fylde Water Board to enlarge their Stocks reservoir and to alter certain other works in connection with their water undertaking to purchase lands for the protection from pollution of the water supplied by the Board and for other purposes.
Newport Corporation Act 1925	15 & 16 Geo. 5. c. lvi	31 July 1925
An Act to authorise the construction of street works in the county borough of Newport to enlarge the powers of the mayor aldermen and burgesses of the borough with respect to their water electricity tramway and omnibus and markets undertakings to make further provision for the health local government and improvement of the borough to authorise the establishment of an insurance fund and for other purposes.
Nottinghamshire County Council (Gunthorpe Bridge) Act 1925 (repealed)	15 & 16 Geo. 5. c. lvii	31 July 1925
An Act to authorise the County Council of the administrative county of Nottingham to acquire the undertaking of the Gunthorpe Bridge Company to authorise the County Council to construct a new bridge at Gunthorpe across the River Trent and for other purposes. (Repealed by Nottinghamshire County Council Act 1985 (c. xv))
Southampton Corporation Act 1925	15 & 16 Geo. 5. c. lviii	31 July 1925
An Act to consolidate the rates of the borough of Southampton to confer further powers upon the mayor aldermen and burgesses of that borough and for other purposes.
Poole Harbour Act 1925	15 & 16 Geo. 5. c. lix	31 July 1925
An Act to change the name of the Commissioners for the harbour of Poole (Note: Name changed from "Commissioners for the harbour of Poole" to "Poole Harbour Commissioners".) to increase the duties rates and charges leviable by the Commissioners and for other purposes.
Leeds Corporation Act 1925 (repealed)	15 & 16 Geo. 5. c. lx	31 July 1925
An Act to confer further powers on the lord mayor aldermen and citizens of the city of Leeds in regard to the construction of tramways new streets and street improvements to enlarge the city to extend the powers of borrowing moneys for the waterworks undertaking and for other purposes. (Repealed by West Yorkshire Act 1980 (c. xiv))
Pontypridd and Rhondda Water Act 1925	15 & 16 Geo. 5. c. lxi	31 July 1925
An Act to confer further powers upon the Pontypridd and Rhondda Joint Water Board and for other purposes.
London Electricity (No. 1) Act 1925	15 & 16 Geo. 5. c. lxii	31 July 1925
An Act to make further and better provision with respect to the supply of electricity in the administrative county of London to confer further powers upon certain of the companies supplying electricity within the said county and for other purposes.
London Electricity (No. 2) Act 1925	15 & 16 Geo. 5. c. lxiii	31 July 1925
An Act to make further provision with respect to the supply of electricity in London and for other purposes.
London County Council (Money) Act 1925 (repealed)	15 & 16 Geo. 5. c. lxiv	31 July 1925
An Act to regulate the expenditure on capital account and lending of money by the London County Council during the financial period from the first day of April one thousand nine hundred and twenty-five to the thirtieth day of September one thousand nine hundred and twenty-six and for other purposes. (Repealed by London County Council (Loans) Act 1955 (4 & 5 Eliz. 2. c.xxvi))
Board of Education Scheme (Winchester Christ's Hospital School Foundation) Confirmation Act 1925	15 & 16 Geo. 5. c. lxv	31 July 1925
An Act to confirm a scheme approved and certified by the Board of Education under the Charitable Trusts Act 1853 (Note: Charitable Trusts Act 1853 (16 & 17 Vict. c. 137)) relating to Christ's Hospital School Foundation in the City of Winchester.
	Scheme approved and certified by the Board of Education under the Charitable Trusts Acts 1853 to 1894 in the matter of Christ's Hospital School Foundation in Winchester.	
Wemyss and District Water Order Confirmation Act 1925	15 & 16 Geo. 5. c. lxvi	31 July 1925
An Act to confirm a Provisional Order under the Private Legislation Procedure (Scotland) Act 1899 relating to Wemyss and District Water.
	Wemyss and District Water Order 1925 Provisional Order to authorise the Wemyss and District Water Trustees to construct additional waterworks to borrow further money and for other purposes.	
Glasgow Corporation Order Confirmation Act 1925	15 & 16 Geo. 5. c. lxvii	31 July 1925
An Act to confirm a Provisional Order under the Private Legislation Procedure (Scotland) Act 1899 relating to Glasgow Corporation.
	Glasgow Corporation Order 1925 Provisional Order to authorise the corporation of the city of Glasgow to construct tramways and other works to extend the limits of the Corporation for the supply of gas to extend the time for the compulsory purchase of lands and the completion of certain works to make provision in connection with the joint collection of assessments to authorise the Corporation to borrow money and for other purposes.	
Kirkcudbright Burgh Order Confirmation Act 1925	15 & 16 Geo. 5. c. lxviii	31 July 1925
An Act to confirm a Provisional Order under the Private Legislation Procedure (Scotland) Act 1899 relating to Kirkcudbright Burgh.
	Kirkcudbright Burgh Order 1925 Provisional Order to authorise the provost magistrates and councillors of the royal burgh of Kirkcudbright to provide an additional water supply and to construct and maintain new waterworks to confer further powers on the Town Council with regard to borrowing and assessments and for other purposes.	
Lanarkshire County Council Order Confirmation Act 1925 (repealed)	15 & 16 Geo. 5. c. lxix	31 July 1925
An Act to confirm a Provisional Order under the Private Legislation Procedure (Scotland) Act 1899 relating to Lanarkshire County Council. (Repealed by Statute Law (Repeals) Act 1986 (c. 12))
	Lanarkshire County Council Order 1925 Provisional Order to extend the limits of supply of the District Committee of the Middle Ward of the County of Lanark under the Lanarkshire (Middle Ward District) Water Acts 1892 to 1922 to confer further powers on the County Council of that county and the Middle Ward Committee in relation to the supply of water to repeal the power of the Corporation of Glasgow to supply water in parts of the parish of Rutherglen to amend the Lanarkshire Gas Orders 1914 to 1922 and to confer further powers on the County Council and their District Committees in relation to the supply of gas to make further provision with regard to the valuation of lands within the county and the public health and good government thereof and for other purposes.	
London and North Eastern Railway Order Confirmation Act 1925	15 & 16 Geo. 5. c. lxx	31 July 1925
An Act to confirm a Provisional Order under the Private Legislation Procedure (Scotland) Act 1899 relating to London and North Eastern Railway.
	London and North Eastern Railway Order 1925 Provisional Order to confer further powers upon the London and North Eastern Railway Company to make provision as to the tolls and charges leviable in respect of the Queensferry and Burntisland and Granton Ferry and for other purposes.	
Land Drainage (Black Sluice) Provisional Order Confirmation Act 1925	15 & 16 Geo. 5. c. lxxi	31 July 1925
An Act to confirm a Provisional Order under the Land Drainage Act 1918 (Note: Land Drainage Act 1918 (8 & 9 Geo. 5. c. 17)) altering the boundaries of the drainage area and altering or supplementing the provisions of the Black Sluice Acts.
	Land Drainage (Black Sluice) Provisional Order.	
Land Drainage (Ouse) Provisional Order Confirmation Act 1925	15 & 16 Geo. 5. c. lxxii	31 July 1925
An Act to confirm a Provisional Order under the Land Drainage Acts 1861 (Note: Land Drainage Act 1861 (24 & 25 Vict. c. 133)) and 1918 amending the Land Drainage (Ouse) Provisional Order Confirmation Act 1920 (Note: Land Drainage (Ouse) Provisional Order Confirmation Act 1920 (10 & 11 Geo. 5. c. cxxii)) and the Order thereby confirmed.
	Land Drainage (Ouse) Provisional Order.	
Pier and Harbour Orders Confirmation (No. 1) Act 1925	15 & 16 Geo. 5. c. lxxiii	31 July 1925
An Act to confirm certain Provisional Orders made by the Minister of Transport under the General Pier and Harbour Act 1861 (Note: General Pier and Harbour Act 1861 (24 & 25 Vict. c. 45)) relating to Cattewater Findochty Llanelly and Port-nan-long.
	Cattewater Harbour Order 1925 Provisional Order for amending the Cattewater Harbour Order 1915 and for conferring further powers on the Cattewater Commissioners.	
	Llanelly Harbour Order 1925 Provisional Order to authorise the Llanelly Harbour Trust to borrow further money for special purposes and to make provision incidental thereto.	
	Findochty Harbour Order 1925 Provisional Order empowering the provost magistrates and councillors of the burgh of Findochty to construct new works at the Findochty Harbour and authorising them to borrow money and for other purposes.	
	Port nan Long Pier Order 1925 Provisional Order for the Maintenance and Regulation of a Pier at Port nan Long Talisker in the Parish of Bracadale Island of Skye and County of Inverness.	
Pier and Harbour Orders Confirmation (No. 2) Act 1925	15 & 16 Geo. 5. c. lxxiv	31 July 1925
An Act to confirm Provisional Orders made by the Minister of Transport under the General Pier and Harbour Act 1861 relating to Clacton-on-Sea Hove and Weymouth.
	Clacton-on-Sea Pier Order 1925 Provisional Order for authorising the widening and extension of the Pier at Clacton-on-Sea in the County of Essex and for other purposes.	
	Hove Pier Order 1925 Provisional Order to revive and extend the powers conferred by the Hove Pier Order 1912 for the construction of works authorised by that Order and for other purposes.	
	Weymouth and Melcombe Regis Harbour Order 1925 Provisional Order conferring powers upon the mayor aldermen and burgesses of the borough of Weymouth and Melcombe Regis with reference to the Harbour of Weymouth and Melcombe Regis and for other purposes.	
Tramways Provisional Orders Act 1925	15 & 16 Geo. 5. c. lxxv	31 July 1925
An Act to confirm certain Provisional Orders made by the Minister of Transport under the Tramways Act 1870 (Note: Tramways Act 1870 (33 & 34 Vict. c. 78)) relating to Liverpool Corporation Tramways and Sheffield Corporation Tramways.
	Liverpool Corporation Tramways Order 1925 Order authorising the lord mayor aldermen and citizens of the city of Liverpool to construct additional tramways in the said city and for other purposes.	
	Sheffield Corporation Tramways Order 1925 Order authorising the lord mayor aldermen and citizens of the city of Sheffield to construct an additional tramway in the said city and for other purposes.	
Leicester Fire Brigade Provisional Order Confirmation Act 1925 (repealed)	15 & 16 Geo. 5. c. lxxvi	31 July 1925
An Act to confirm a Provisional Order made by one of His Majesty's Principal Secretaries of State under section thirty-two of the Police Pensions Act 1921 (Note: Police Pensions Act 1921 (11 & 12 Geo. 5. c. 31)) modifying the provisions of Part IX. of the Leicester Corporation Act 1908 (Note: Leicester Corporation Act 1908 (8 Edw. 7. c. lvi)) in respect of the pensions allowance and gratuities payable to members of the permanent fire brigade of the City of Leicester their widows children and dependants. (Repealed by Leicester Corporation Act 1956 (4 & 5 Eliz. 2. c. xlix))
	Provisional Order made in pursuance of section 32 of the Police Pensions Act 1921.	
Salford Provisional Order Confirmation Act 1925	15 & 16 Geo. 5. c. lxxvii	31 July 1925
An Act to confirm a Provisional Order made by one of His Majesty's Principal Secretaries of State under the Public Health Act 1875 (Note: Public Health Act 1875 (38 & 39 Vict. c. 55)) relating to Salford.
	Salford Order 1925 Provisional Order for altering the Salford Corporation Act 1920. (Note: Salford Corporation Act 1920 (10 & 11 Geo. 5. c. cxlviii))	
Ministry of Health Provisional Orders Confirmation (No. 3) Act 1925	15 & 16 Geo. 5. c. lxxviii	31 July 1925
An Act to confirm certain Provisional Orders of the Minister of Health relating to Abergavenny Brighton Colwyn Bay and Colwyn Parts of Holland Mitcham Newton in Mackerfield Shoreham-by-Sea and Stoke-on-Trent.
	Abergavenny Order 1925 Provisional Order for partially repealing altering or amending certain Local Acts.	
	Brighton (Poor Law) Order 1925 Provisional Order for partially repealing and altering the Local Act 6 George IV. Chapter clxxix. (Note: Brighthelmston Improvement and Poor Relief Act 1825 (6 Geo. 4. c. clxxix))	
	Colwyn Bay and Colwyn Order 1925 Provisional Order for amending the Colwyn Bay and Colwyn Urban District Council Act 1902. (Note: Colwyn Bay and Colwyn Urban District Council Act 1902 (2 Edw. 7. c. clxxv))	
	County of the Parts of Holland Order 1925 Provisional Order made in pursuance of Sections 69 (2) and 87 of the Local Government Act 1888.	
	Mitcham Order 1925 Provisional Order for amending the Mitcham Urban District Council Act 1923. (Note: Mitcham Urban District Council Act 1923 (13 & 14 Geo. 5. c. lxviii))	
	Newton in Mackerfield Order 1925 Provisional Order for altering the Newton District Improvement Act 1855. (Note: Newton District Improvement Act 1855 (18 & 19 Vict. c. c))	
	Shoreham-by-Sea Order 1925 Provisional Order to enable the Urban District Council of Shoreham-by-Sea to put in force the Compulsory Clauses of the Lands Clauses Acts.	
	Stoke-on-Trent Special Rates Order 1925 Provisional Order made in pursuance of Section 59 of the Local Government Act 1888 and Section 303 of the Public Health Act 1875 to amend the Borough of Stoke-on-Trent Order 1908 the Stoke-on-Trent (Extension) Order 1921 and the Stoke-on-Trent Corporation Act 1923. (Note: Stoke-on-Trent Corporation Act 1923 (13 & 14 Geo. 5. c. cvii))	
Air Ministry (Cattewater Seaplane Station) Act 1925	15 & 16 Geo. 5. c. lxxix	7 August 1925
An Act to confirm an agreement between the Cattewater Commissioners and the President of the Air Council in relation to the acquisition of certain lands in the county of Devon and for purposes in connection therewith.
Ministry of Health Provisional Orders Confirmation (No. 4) Act 1925	15 & 16 Geo. 5. c. lxxx	7 August 1925
An Act to confirm certain Provisional Orders of the Minister of Health relating to Blackburn Guisborough Joint Hospital District Harrogate Liverpool Newcastle-upon-Tyne Newport (Isle of Wight) and Swansea.
	Blackburn Order 1925 Provisional Order for amending certain Local Acts.	
	Guisborough Joint Hospital Order 1925 Provisional Order for forming a United District under Section 279 of the Public Health Act 1875.	
	Harrogate Order 1925 Provisional Order for altering the Harrogate Improvement Act 1841 (Note: Harrogate Improvement Act 1841 (4 & 5 Vict. c. xvi)) the Harrogate Corporation Act 1893 (Note: Harrogate Corporation Act 1893 (56 & 57 Vict. c. ccix)) and two Confirming Acts. (Note: Local Government (No. 6) Act 1868 (31 & 32 Vict. c. cliii)) (Note: Local Government Board's Provisional Orders Confirmation (No. 4) Act 1906 (6 Edw. 7. c. ciii))	
	Liverpool Order 1925 Provisional Order for amending the Liverpool Corporation Act 1921. (Note: Liverpool Corporation Act 1921 (11 & 12 Geo. 5. c. lxxiv))	
	Newcastle-upon-Tyne Order 1925 Provisional Order for amending the Newcastle-upon-Tyne Corporation Act 1904. (Note: Newcastle-upon-Tyne Corporation Act 1904 (4 Edw. 7. c. ccxx))	
	Newport (Isle of Wight) Order 1925 Provisional Order for altering the Newport (Isle of Wight) Borough Act 1876. (Note: Newport (Isle of Wight) Borough Act 1876 (39 & 40 Vict. c. lxi))	
	Swansea Order 1925 Provisional Order for amending certain Local Acts.	
Ministry of Health Provisional Orders Confirmation (No. 5) Act 1925	15 & 16 Geo. 5. c. lxxxi	7 August 1925
An Act to confirm certain Provisional Orders of the Minister of Health relating to Bury Saint Edmund's Hastings Northampton Paignton Poole and Sheffield.
	Bury Saint Edmund's Order 1925 Provisional Order to enable the Bury Saint Edmund's Corporation to put in force the Compulsory Clauses of the Lands Clauses Acts.	
	Hastings Order 1925 Provisional Order to enable the Hastings Corporation to put in force the Compulsory Clauses of the Lands Clauses Acts.	
	Northampton Order 1925 Provisional Order to enable the Northampton Corporation to put in force the Compulsory Clauses of the Lands Clauses Acts.	
	Paignton Order 1925 Provisional Order to enable the Urban District Council of Paignton to put in force the Compulsory Clauses of the Lands Clauses Acts.	
	Poole Order 1925 Provisional Order to enable the Poole Corporation to put in force the Compulsory Clauses of the Lands Clauses Acts.	
	Sheffield (Compulsory Purchase of Lands) Order 1925 Provisional Order to enable the Sheffield Corporation to put in force the Compulsory Clauses of the Lands Clauses Acts.	
Ministry of Health Provisional Orders Confirmation (No. 6) Act 1925	15 & 16 Geo. 5. c. lxxxii	7 August 1925
An Act to confirm certain Provisional Orders of the Minister of Health relating to Beckenham Brighton Bury Richmond (Surrey) Southend-on-Sea and Swindon.
	Beckenham Order 1925 Provisional Order to enable the Urban District Council of Beckenham to put in force the Compulsory Clauses of the Lands Clauses Acts.	
	Brighton Order 1925 Provisional Order to enable the Brighton Corporation to put in force the Compulsory Clauses of the Lands Clauses Acts.	
	Bury Order 1925 Provisional Order to enable the Bury Corporation to put in force the Compulsory Clauses of the Lands Clauses Acts.	
	Richmond (Surrey) Order 1925 Provisional Order to enable the Richmond (Surrey) Corporation to put in force the Compulsory Clauses of the Lands Clauses Acts.	
	Southend-on-Sea Order 1925 Provisional Order to enable the Southend-on-Sea Corporation to put in force the Compulsory Clauses of the Lands Clauses Acts.	
	Swindon Order 1925 Provisional Order to enable the Swindon Corporation to put in force the Compulsory Clauses of the Lands Clauses Acts and to amend the Swindon Corporation (Wilts and Berks Canal Abandonment) Act 1914. (Note: Swindon Corporation (Wilts and Berks Canal Abandonment) Act 1914 (4 & 5 Geo. 5. c. cviii))	
Ministry of Health Provisional Orders Confirmation (No. 7) Act 1925	15 & 16 Geo. 5. c. lxxxiii	7 August 1925
An Act to confirm certain Provisional Orders of the Minister of Health relating to Birstal Bournemouth Huddersfield Kettering Joint Hospital District South Staffordshire Joint Smallpox Hospital District and Worcester.
	Birstal Order 1925 Provisional Order for partially repealing the Birstal Local Board Act 1872. (Note: Birstal Local Board Act 1872 (35 & 36 Vict. c. lxxiii))	
	Bournemouth Order 1925 Provisional Order for altering the Bournemouth Corporation Act 1904. (Note: Bournemouth Corporation Act 1904 (4 Edw. 7. c. cliii))	
	Huddersfield Order 1925 Provisional Order for altering the Huddersfield Corporation Act 1906. (Note: Huddersfield Corporation Act 1906 (6 Edw. 7. c. lxxxiv))	
	Kettering Joint Hospital Order 1925 Provisional Order for amending the Kettering Joint Hospital Order 1895.	
	South Staffordshire Joint Small-pox Hospital Order 1925 Provisional Order for altering certain Orders confirmed by Parliament.	
	Worcester Order 1925 Provisional Order for repealing the Local Act 7 Will. IV. Cap. Ivii. (Note: Worcester Markets and Drainage Act 1837 (7 Will. 4 & 1 Vict. c. lviii)) relating to the City of Worcester and for amending the Worcester Extension Act 1885. (Note: Worcester Extension Act 1885 (48 & 49 Vict. c. clxiv))	
Ministry of Health Provisional Orders Confirmation (No. 8) Act 1925	15 & 16 Geo. 5. c. lxxxiv	7 August 1925
An Act to confirm certain Provisional Orders of the Minister of Health relating to Adwick-leStreet Gloucester Keighley Peterborough and Southport.
	Adwick-le-Street Order 1925 Provisional Order to enable the Urban District Council of Adwick-le-Street to put in force the Compulsory Clauses of the Lands Clauses Acts.	
	Gloucester Order 1925 Provisional Order to enable the Gloucester Corporation to put in force the Compulsory Clauses of the Lands Clauses Acts.	
	Keighley Order 1925 Provisional Order to enable the Keighley Corporation to put in force the Compulsory Clauses of the Lands Clauses Acts.	
	Peterborough Order 1925 Provisional Order to enable the Peterborough Corporation to put in force the Compulsory Clauses of the Lands Clauses Acts.	
	Southport Order 1925 Provisional Order to enable the Southport Corporation to put in force the Compulsory Clauses of the Lands Clauses Acts.	
Ministry of Health Provisional Orders Confirmation (No. 9) Act 1925	15 & 16 Geo. 5. c. lxxxv	7 August 1925
An Act to confirm certain Provisional Orders of the Minister of Health relating to Abingdon Joint Hospital District Earsdon Joint Hospital District Flint Sheffield South Chilterns Joint Smallpox Hospital District West Hartlepool and Weymouth and Melcombe Regis.
	Abingdon Joint Hospital Order 1925 Provisional Order for altering the Local Government Board's Provisional Orders Confirmation (No. 4) Act 1898. (Note: Local Government Board's Provisional Orders Confirmation (No. 4) Act 1898 (61 & 62 Vict. c. lxxvii))	
	Earsdon Joint Hospital Order 1925 Provisional Order for altering a Confirming Act. (Note: Local Government Board's Provisional Orders Confirmation (No. 3) Act 1904 (4 Edw. 7. c. lxiv))	
	County of Flint Order 1925 Provisional Order made in pursuance of subsection (2) of Section 69 of the Local Government Act 1888.	
	Sheffield Order 1925 Provisional Order for amending certain Local Acts.	
	South Chilterns Joint Smallpox Hospital Order 1925 Provisional Order for altering two Provisional Orders confirmed by Parliament.	
	West Hartlepool Order 1925 Provisional Order for partially repealing and amending certain Local and Confirmation Acts.	
	Weymouth and Melcombe Regis Order 1925 Provisional Order for partially repealing altering or amending the Weymouth and Melcombe Regis Corporation Act 1914. (Note: Weymouth and Melcombe Regis Corporation Act 1914 (4 & 5 Geo. 5. c. clxxiv))	
Ministry of Health Provisional Orders Confirmation (Water) Act 1925	15 & 16 Geo. 5. c. lxxxvi	7 August 1925
An Act to confirm certain Provisional Orders of the Minister of Health relating to Bull Bay Water Higham and Hundred of Hoo Water and Monks and Princes Risborough Water.
	Bull Bay Water Order 1925 Provisional Order under the Gas and Water Works Facilities Act 1870 (Note: Gas and Water Works Facilities Act 1870 (33 & 34 Vict. c. 70)) and the Gas and Water Works Facilities Act 1870 Amendment Act 1873 (Note: Gas and Water Works Facilities Act 1870 Amendment Act 1873 (36 & 37 Vict. c. 89)) to authorise the construction and maintenance of waterworks and the supply of water in part of the Urban District of Amlwch in the County of Anglesey.	
	Higham and Hundred of Hoo Water Order 1925 Provisional Order under the Gas and Water Works Facilities Act 1870 and the Gas and Water Works Facilities Act 1870 Amendment Act 1873 empowering the Higham and Hundred of Hoo Water Company to construct and maintain additional waterworks to raise additional capital and for other purposes.	
	Monks and Princes Risborough Water Order 1925 Provisional Order under the Gas and Water Works Facilities Act 1870 and the Gas and Water Works Facilities Act 1870 Amendment Act 1873 for empowering the Rural Districts Water Company Limited to construct and maintain waterworks and to supply water in parts of the Rural District of Wycombe in the County of Buckinghaт.	
West Hartlepool Corporation (Trolley Vehicles) Order Confirmation Act 1925 (repealed)	15 & 16 Geo. 5. c. lxxxvii	7 August 1925
An Act to confirm a Provisional Order made by the Minister of Transport under the West Hartlepool Corporation Act 1923 (Note: West Hartlepool Corporation Act 1923 (13 & 14 Geo. 5. c. xcv)) relating to West Hartlepool Corporation trolley vehicles. (Repealed by County of Cleveland Act 1987 (c. ix))
	West Hartlepool Corporation (Trolley Vehicles) Order 1925 Order authorising the mayor aldermen and burgesses of the borough of West Hartlepool to use trolley vehicles upon routes in the borough of Hartlepool.	
Irvine Burgh Order Confirmation Act 1925	15 & 16 Geo. 5. c. lxxxviii	7 August 1925
An Act to confirm a Provisional Order under the Private Legislation Procedure (Scotland) Act 1899 relating to Irvine Burgh.
	Irvine Burgh Order 1925 Provisional Order to extend the powers of the provost magistrates and councillors of the royal burgh of Irvine under the Burial Grounds (Scotland) Acts to the whole of the burgh to make provision with regard to the common good of the burgh and for other purposes.	
Victoria Infirmary of Glasgow Act 1888 (Amendment) Order Confirmation Act 1925	15 & 16 Geo. 5. c. lxxxix	7 August 1925
An Act to confirm a Provisional Order under the Private Legislation Procedure (Scotland) Act 1899 relating to the Victoria Infirmary of Glasgow.
	Victoria Infirmary of Glasgow Act 1888 (Amendment) Order 1925 Provisional Order to confer further powers on the Governors of the Victoria Infirmary of Glasgow to amend the provisions of the Victoria Infirmary of Glasgow Act 1888 (Note: Victoria Infirmary of Glasgow Act 1888 (51 & 52 Vict. c. xxxvi)) as modified by the Victoria Infirmary of Glasgow Act 1888 (Amendment) Order Confirmation Act 1919 and for other purposes.	
Stock Conversion and Investment Trust Limited Act 1925	15 & 16 Geo. 5. c. xc	7 August 1925
An Act to alter the provisions of certain trust deeds regulating the issue of preferred and deferred stocks in respect of certain railway ordinary stocks to confer further powers upon the trustees of those trust deeds and upon the Stock Conversion and Investment Trust Limited and the Railway Investment Company Limited and upon certain trustees of the Railway Investment Company Limited and for other purposes.
Hoylake and West Kirby Urban District Council Act 1925	15 & 16 Geo. 5. c. xci	7 August 1925
An Act to provide for the transfer of the undertaking of the Hoylake and West Kirby Gas and Water Company to the urban district council of Hoylake and West Kirby to authorise the Council to supply gas and water in and in the neighbourhood of their district and for other purposes.
Burnley Corporation Act 1925	15 & 16 Geo. 5. c. xcii	7 August 1925
An Act to authorise the Corporation of Burnley to construct street works waterworks and tramways to confer further powers upon the Corporation as to the running of omnibuses and in regard to their tramways water gas and electricity undertakings and the health local government and improvement of the borough to alter the boundary of the borough and to provide for the consolidation of the rates thereof and for other purposes.
Bath Corporation Act 1925	15 & 16 Geo. 5. c. xciii	7 August 1925
An Act to authorise the mayor aldermen and citizens of the city of Bath to execute street works and to acquire certain toll bridges to confer further powers upon them in regard to their water and electricity undertakings to provide for the consolidation of the rates of the city to make further provision with regard to the health local government and improvement of the city and for other purposes.
Middlesex County Council Act 1925 (repealed)	15 & 16 Geo. 5. c. xciv	7 August 1925
An Act to confer further powers upon the Middlesex County Council and the Metropolitan Electric Tramways Limited in reference to their light railways and tramways and to make further provision in regard to those light railways and tramways to empower the said Council to construct street improvements and tramways to make further provision in reference to roads in the county of Middlesex and for other purposes. (Repealed by Middlesex County Council Act 1944 (7 & 8 Geo. 6. c. xxi))
Slough Trading Company Act 1925	15 & 16 Geo. 5. c. xcv	7 August 1925
An Act for providing for the regulation of certain roads on the Slough Trading Estate and for other purposes.
Stockton-on-Tees Corporation Act 1925	15 & 16 Geo. 5. c. xcvi	7 August 1925
An Act to provide for the purchase of the undertaking and business of the Haverton Hill-on-Tees Gas Company Limited by the mayor aldermen and burgesses of the borough of Stockton-on-Tees to extend the areas of supply for gas and electricity of the Stockton-on-Tees Corporation to confer further powers on the Corporation with regard to the supply of gas and electricity and the consolidation of rates and for other purposes.
Oldham Corporation Act 1925	15 & 16 Geo. 5. c. xcvii	7 August 1925
An Act to empower the mayor aldermen and burgesses of the county borough of Oldham to execute street improvements to confer further powers upon them in connection with their several undertakings to consolidate with amendments the local legislation relating to their tramways undertaking to make better provision for the health local government and finance of the borough and the levying of rates therein and for other purposes.
Mansfield Corporation Act 1925	15 & 16 Geo. 5. c. xcviii	7 August 1925
An Act to empower the mayor aldermen and burgesses of the borough of Mansfield to execute street improvements to make further provision in regard to the water gas and electricity undertakings of the Corporation and for the health local government and improvement of the borough to consolidate the rates of the borough and for other purposes.
Mid-Glamorgan Water Act 1925	15 & 16 Geo. 5. c. xcix	7 August 1925
An Act to authorise the Mid-Glamorgan Water Board to construct further waterworks to confirm existing works and for other purposes.
Newbury Corporation Act 1925	15 & 16 Geo. 5. c. c	7 August 1925
An Act to provide for the transfer of the undertaking of the Newbury District Water Company Limited to the Newbury Corporation to authorise the Corporation to supply water in and in the neighbourhood of their borough to make further provision with regard to the improvement of the borough and the consolidation of rates and for other purposes.
London, Midland and Scottish Railway Act 1925	15 & 16 Geo. 5. c. ci	7 August 1925
An Act to empower the London Midland and Scottish Railway Company to construct railways and works and to acquire lands and for other purposes.
Blackpool Improvement Act 1925	15 & 16 Geo. 5. c. cii	7 August 1925
An Act to confer further powers upon the mayor aldermen and burgesses of the borough of Blackpool for the construction of street improvements and tramways and the running of omnibuses to enlarge their powers in regard to their tramway gas and electricity undertakings and to make further provision with respect to the health local government and improvement of the borough and for other purposes.
Ipswich Corporation Act 1925	15 & 16 Geo. 5. c. ciii	7 August 1925
An Act to empower the mayor aldermen and burgesses of the borough of Ipswich to provide and work trolley vehicles to make further provision with regard to the health local government and improvement of the borough and for other purposes.
Leek Urban District Council Water Act 1925	15 & 16 Geo. 5. c. civ	7 August 1925
An Act to empower the urban district council of Leek to construct waterworks to make further provision with regard to their water undertaking and for other purposes.
Scarborough Corporation Act 1925	15 & 16 Geo. 5. c. cv	7 August 1925
An Act to empower the Corporation of Scarborough to construct street improvements and to provide and work lifts on the cliffs of the borough to make further provision with regard to public gardens pleasure grounds and other lands in the borough and the neighbourhood thereof to make further and better provision for the improvement health and good government of the borough to provide for the consolidation of the rates of the borough and for other purposes.
Colonial Bank Act 1925	15 & 16 Geo. 5. c. cvi	7 August 1925
An Act to provide a new constitution for The Colonial Bank and to re-incorporate the same to reorganise its capital to confer further powers on The Colonial Bank to repeal existing Charters and Acts and for further purposes.
Barrow-in-Furness Corporation Act 1925	15 & 16 Geo. 5. c. cvii	7 August 1925
An Act to empower the mayor aldermen and burgesses of the borough of Barrow-in-Furness to provide and work omnibuses and trolley vehicles to make further provision with regard to the tramways gas electricity markets and other undertakings of the Corporation to make provision for altering the number of councillors and aldermen to consolidate the rates of the borough and to make further provision with regard to the health local government and improvement thereof and for other purposes.
Uckfield Gas and Electricity Act 1925	15 & 16 Geo. 5. c. cviii	7 August 1925
An Act for incorporating and conferring powers on the Uckfield Gas and Electricity Company.
Nottingham Corporation Act 1925	15 & 16 Geo. 5. c. cix	7 August 1925
An Act to authorise the mayor aldermen and citizens of the city of Nottingham and county of the same city to construct street works a railway and tramways to provide and work trolley vehicles on further routes to extend the Corporation's water limits to provide for the establishment of a yarn and textile testing bureau by University College Nottingham to confer further powers on the Corporation with regard to the good government of the city and for other purposes.
Mersey Tunnel Act 1925	15 & 16 Geo. 5. c. cx	7 August 1925
An Act to authorise the construction of a tunnel under the River Mersey between Liverpool and Birkenhead and for other purposes.
Boothferry Bridge Act 1925	15 & 16 Geo. 5. c. cxi	7 August 1925
An Act to empower the county council of the West Riding of Yorkshire to construct a new bridge over the River Ouse to provide for contributions thereto by the county council of the East Riding of Yorkshire the lord mayor aldermen and citizens of the city and county of Kingston upon Hull and the Goole Urban District Council and for the vesting of the said bridge in the said county councils and for other purposes.
West Ham Corporation Act 1925	15 & 16 Geo. 5. c. cxii	7 August 1925
An Act to authorise the mayor aldermen and burgesses of the county borough of West Ham to acquire lands to confer upon them powers with reference to their tramway and electricity undertakings and for other purposes.
West Cheshire Water Board Act 1925	15 & 16 Geo. 5. c. cxiii	7 August 1925
An Act to constitute the West Cheshire Water Board to transfer to them the undertaking of the West Cheshire Water Company and certain works of the Wirral Waterworks Company and for other purposes.
Clydebank Burgh Extension Act 1925	15 & 16 Geo. 5. c. cxiv	7 August 1925
An Act to extend the boundaries of the burgh of Clydebank and for other purposes.
Surrey County Council Act 1925 (repealed)	15 & 16 Geo. 5. c. cxv	7 August 1925
An Act to make provision for preventing pollution and obstruction of certain streams and securing proper land drainage in the county of Surrey to confer on the Surrey County Council further powers for those purposes and for the better government and administration of the county in relation to maternity homes employment agencies places of public entertainment and the manufacture and sale of ice-cream and with respect to main and arterial roads to authorise the Council to establish fire and employers liability insurance funds and for other purposes. (Repealed by Surrey Act 1985 (c. iii))
Darlington Corporation (Transport, &c.) Act 1925 or the Darlington Corporation Act 1925	15 & 16 Geo. 5. c. cxvi	7 August 1925
An Act to empower the mayor aldermen and burgesses of the county borough of Darlington to substitute trolley vehicles and omnibuses for their light railways and for other purposes.
New Shoreham Harbour Act 1925	15 & 16 Geo. 5. c. cxvii	7 August 1925
An Act to alter and increase the rates tolls and dues leviable by the Shoreham Harbour Trustees to authorise them to acquire lands and for other purposes.
Hartlepool Corporation Act 1925 (repealed)	15 & 16 Geo. 5. c. cxviii	7 August 1925
An Act to empower the mayor aldermen and burgesses of the borough of Hartlepool to run omnibuses to make further provision for the health local government and improvement of the borough to consolidate the rates of the borough and for other purposes. (Repealed by County of Cleveland Act 1987 (c. ix))
London County Council (General Powers) Act 1925	15 & 16 Geo. 5. c. cxix	7 August 1925
An Act to confer further powers upon the London County Council and the metropolitan borough councils to make provision with respect to the admission into the London main drainage system of sewage and drainage from the urban districts of Walthamstow and Leyton and for other purposes.
Manchester Ship Canal Act 1925	15 & 16 Geo. 5. c. cxx	7 August 1925
An Act to confer further powers on the Manchester Ship Canal Company and for other purposes.
Bradford Corporation Act 1925	15 & 16 Geo. 5. c. cxxi	7 August 1925
An Act to enable the lord mayor aldermen and citizens of the city of Bradford to construct waterworks and acquire lands to authorise them to run omnibuses to make further provisions for the health improvement and good government of the city and for other purposes.
Walsall Corporation Act 1925 (repealed)	15 & 16 Geo. 5. c. cxxii	7 August 1925
An Act to empower the mayor aldermen and burgesses of the borough of Walsall to provide and work trolley vehicles on further routes to empower them to purchase lands for various purposes and to confer further powers with regard to the improvement of the borough and the consolidation of rates and for other purposes. (Repealed by Walsall Corporation Act 1969 (c. lviii))
Wolverhampton Corporation Act 1925 (repealed)	15 & 16 Geo. 5. c. cxxiii	7 August 1925
An Act to empower the mayor aldermen and burgesses of the borough of Wolverhampton to provide and work trolley vehicles and to confer further powers upon them with regard to the provision and working of omnibuses to empower the Corporation to construct street improvements to make further provision with regard to the tramway omnibus and electricity undertakings of the Corporation and the health local government and improvement of the borough to amend the law with regard to the making assessment and collection of rates in the borough and the Wolverhampton Poor Law Union and for other purposes. (Repealed by Wolverhampton Corporation Act 1969 (c. lx))
Bexhill Corporation Act 1925	15 & 16 Geo. 5. c. cxxiv	10 December 1925
An Act to provide for the transfer of the undertaking of the Bexhill Water and Gas Company to the Bexhill Corporation to authorise the Corporation to supply water and gas in and in the neighbourhood of their borough to make further provision with regard to the health improvement and good government of the borough and the consolidation of rates and for other purposes.
Leith Harbour and Docks Order Confirmation Act 1925 (repealed)	15 & 16 Geo. 5. c. cxxv	10 December 1925
An Act to confirm a Provisional Order under the Private Legislation Procedure (Scotland) Act 1899 relating to Leith Harbour and Docks. (Repealed by Statute Law (Repeals) Act 1986 (c. 12))
	Leith Harbour and Docks Order 1925 Provisional Order to authorise The Commissioners for the Harbour and Docks of Leith to construct new works and for other purposes.	
Campbeltown Harbour and Gas Order Confirmation Act 1925	15 & 16 Geo. 5. c. cxxvi	10 December 1925
An Act to confirm a Provisional Order under the Private Legislation Procedure (Scotland) Act 1899 relating to Campbeltown Harbour and Gas.
	Campbeltown Harbour and Gas Order 1925 Provisional Order to make provision as to the statutory tolls rates duties and charges leviable at the Harbour of Campbeltown and to authorise the Provost Magistrates and Councillors of the Royal Burgh of Campbeltown to borrow further moneys for the general purposes of their Gas Undertaking and for other purposes.	
Sandwich Port and Haven Act 1925	15 & 16 Geo. 5. c. cxxvii	22 December 1925
An Act to provide for the conservancy, regulation, management and improvement of the Port and Haven of Sandwich, and for purposes connected therewith.
Ministry of Health Provisional Order Confirmation (Bournemouth Order) Act 1925 (repealed)	15 & 16 Geo. 5. c. cxxviii	22 December 1925
An Act to confirm a Provisional Order of the Minister of Health relating to Bournemouth. (Repealed by Bournemouth Borough Council Act 1985 (c. v))
	Bournemouth (Compulsory Purchase of Lands) Order 1925 Provisional Order to enable the Bournemouth Corporation to put in force the Compulsory Clauses of the Lands Clauses Acts.	
Aberdeen Corporation Order Confirmation Act 1925 (repealed)	15 & 16 Geo. 5. c. cxxix	22 December 1925
An Act to confirm a Provisional Order under the Private Legislation Procedure (Scotland) Act 1899 relating to Aberdeen Corporation. (Repealed by Aberdeen Corporation (Administration Finance, &c.) Order Confirmation Act 1940 (3 & 4 Geo. 6. c. iii))
	Aberdeen Corporation Order 1925 Provisional Order to authorise the corporation of the city and royal burgh of Aberdeen to use part of the links for entertainment buildings to make further provision with respect to the esplanade to borrow further moneys and to make provision for other purposes.	
Baldovan Institute for the Treatment and Education of Defectives Order Confirmation Act 1925	15 & 16 Geo. 5. c. cxxx	22 December 1925
An Act to confirm a Provisional Order under the Private Legislation Procedure (Scotland) Act 1899 relating to Baldovan Institute for the Treatment and Education of Defectives.
	Baldovan Institute for the Treatment and Education of Defectives Order 1925 Provisional Order to incorporate a body for the maintenance and management of the Baldovan Institute for the treatment and education of defectives and for other purposes.	
Glasgow Boundaries Act 1925	15 & 16 Geo. 5. c. cxxxi	22 December 1925
An Act to extend the boundaries of the city and royal burgh of Glasgow and of the county of the city of Glasgow and to alter and adjust the boundaries of the counties of Lanark Renfrew and Dunbarton and for other purposes.
Bedfordshire, Cambridgeshire and Huntingdonshire Electricity Act 1925	15 & 16 Geo. 5. c. cxxxii	22 December 1925
An Act for incorporating and conferring powers upon the Bedfordshire Cambridgeshire and Huntingdonshire Electricity Company and for other purposes.

== See also ==
- List of acts of the Parliament of the United Kingdom
