= Privy Council of Scotland =

Body that advised the Scottish monarch

- Royal coat of arms of the Kingdom of Scotland
- Abbreviation: Privy Council (PC)
- Merged into: Privy Council of Great Britain
- Successor: Privy Council
- Formation: c. 1490
- Legal status: Advisory body to the Scottish monarch
- Headquarters: Palace of Holyroodhouse, Edinburgh, Scotland
- Region served: Kingdom of Scotland
- Monarch: Queen Anne (last)
- Lord President: James Graham, 1st Duke of Montrose (last)

The Privy Council of Scotland (c. 1490 — 1 May 1708) was a body that advised the Scottish monarch. During its existence, the Privy Council of Scotland was essentially considered as the government of the Kingdom of Scotland, and was seen as the most important element of central government.

In the range of its functions the council was often more important than the Estates in the running the country. Its registers include a wide range of material on the political, administrative, economic and social affairs of the Kingdom of Scotland. The council supervised the administration of the law, regulated trade and shipping, took emergency measures against the plague, granted licences to travel, administered oaths of allegiance, banished beggars and gypsies, dealt with witches, recusants, Covenanters and Jacobites and tackled the problem of lawlessness in the Highlands and the Borders.

The council was officially abolished in 1708 and merged with the Privy Council of England to create the newly established Privy Council of Great Britain to serve in the same advisory functions to the monarch of the newly created state, the Kingdom of Great Britain, which was established under the terms of the Treaty of Union in 1707.

== History ==
=== Development ===
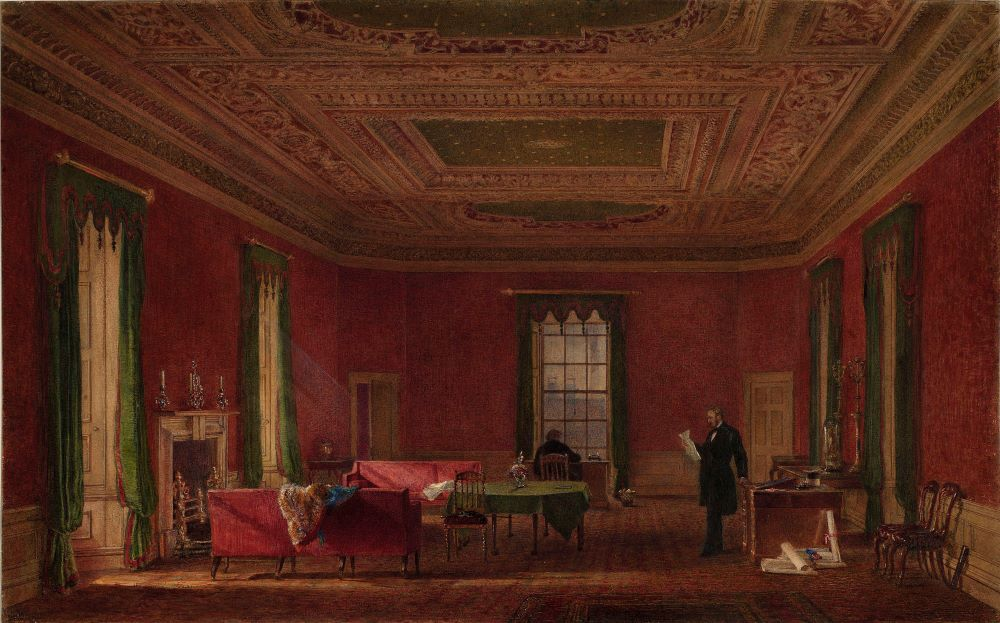
The Privy Council of Scotland met in the Palace of Holyroodhouse, Edinburgh, between the 1670s until 1708

Like the Parliament, the council was a development of the King's Council. The King's Council, or curia regis, was the court of the monarch surrounded by his royal officers and others upon whom he relied for advice. It is known to have existed in the thirteenth century, if not earlier, but has left little trace of its activities.

By the later fifteenth century the council had advisory, executive and judicial functions though surviving records are mainly confined to the last. It is at this period that the 'secret' or privy council makes its formal appearance when, in February 1490, parliament elected 2 bishops, an abbot or prior, 6 barons and 8 royal officers to form the king's council for the ostensioun and forthputting of the King's authorite in the administracioun of justice.

=== Lords of Secret Council ===
The Lords of Secret Council, as they were known, were part of the general body of Lords of Council, like the Lords of Session and Lords Auditors of Exchequer. After 1532 much of the judicial business was transferred to the newly founded College of Justice, the later Court of Session. The council met regularly and was particularly active during periods of a monarch's minority. A separate register of the privy council appears in 1545 and probably marks the point at which the secret council split off from its parent body.

After 1603 James VI was able to boast to the English Parliament that he governed Scotland with my pen. The council received his written instructions and executed his will. This style of government, continued by his grandsons Charles II and James VII, was disrupted during the reign of Charles I by the Covenanters and the Cromwellian occupation. There are gaps in the register during the upheavals of 1638–41 when the council was largely displaced by an alternative administration set up by the Covenanters and during the Cromwellian period, the council ceased to act at all.

=== Acts of Union and abolishment ===
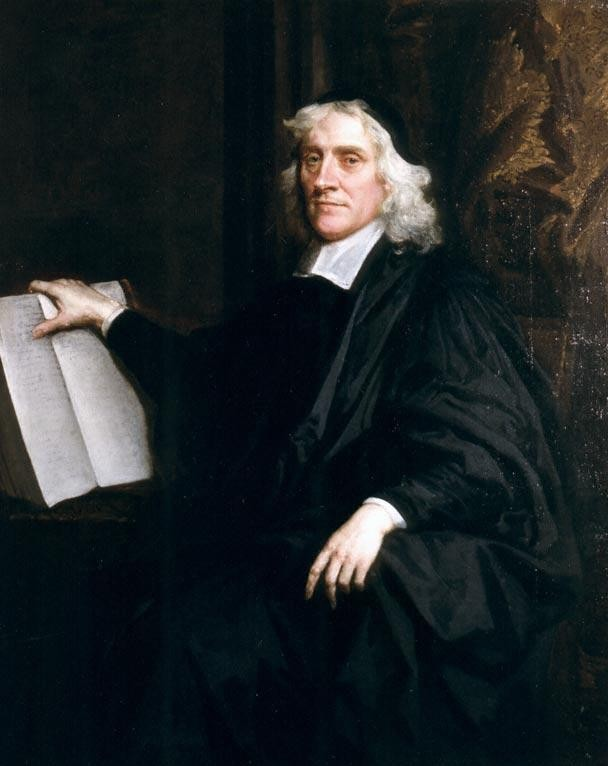
James Sharp, appointed to the Privy Council in 1663

After the restoration of the monarchy in 1660, Charles II nominated his own privy councillors and set up a council in London through which he directed affairs in Edinburgh, a situation that continued after the Glorious Revolution of 1688–9. Until 1707, the Privy Council met in what is now the West Drawing Room at the Palace of Holyroodhouse in Edinburgh. It was called the Council Chamber in the 17th century. The Register of the Privy Council of Scotland (1545–1689) was edited and published between 1877 and 1970 by John Hill Burton, David Masson, Peter Hume Brown and Henry Macleod Paton.

The council survived the Act of Union but for one year only. It was abolished on 1 May 1708 by the Parliament of Great Britain and thereafter there was one Privy Council of Great Britain sitting in London.

Whilst the Kingdom of Scotland's legal, education and religious institutions were unaffected by the terms of the Treaty of Union and remained distinct and separate following the union, the Privy Council of Scotland was given somewhat a vague reassurance in the Treaty of Union. Article 19 of the 1707 treaty stated that "after the union the queen’s majesty and her royal successors may continue a privy council in Scotland, for preserving of public peace and order, until the parliament of Great Britain shall think fit to alter it, or establish any other effectual method for that end". As a result, the Privy Council of Scotland was considered vulnerable especially as a result of unravelling of party politics in both Edinburgh and London.

The abolition of the Privy Council of Scotland occurred on 1 May 1708, twelve months following the Treaty of Union coming into force. The Privy Council of Great Britain was created, with the Privy Council of Scotland and the Privy Council of England both being abolished and being subsumed into the new Privy Council of Great Britain. The absence of central executive power in Edinburgh which had access to local intelligence and the ability to respond quickly to affairs in Scotland provided problems for government in Scotland, particularly in relation to the Jacobite threat.

== Functions of the council ==
The government of the Kingdom of Scotland was effectively the privy council. Prior to it being abolished in 1708 and merged into the newly created Privy Council of Great Britain, the Privy Council of Scotland was the most important element of the central government in the country, and was responsible for handling day-to-day responsibilities in conjunction with the incumbent reigning monarch, however, monarchs of the Kingdom of Scotland prior 1603 had different ways of collaborating with the council.

Beginning in the early 17th century, the Privy Council of Scotland began to divide responsibilities into two different areas, the Acta (government or state business) and Decreta (judicial and private business). Due to there being no formal government departments in the Kingdom of Scotland during the councils operation, it was the only forum to exist which allowed policy matters and decision making to be discussed. The responsibilities of the Privy Council of Scotland included law and order, military matters which included the recruitment and supply of military personnel and coastal defence, government finance and taxation, promulgation and enforcement of statute, oversight of local government, ecclesiastical affairs, responses to national crises, and the organisation of nationally significant events, most notably summoning and staging parliaments, as well as national celebrations, thanksgivings and fasts. In its judicial capacity, the Privy Council of Scotland responded to complaints about criminal activities, summoned suspected criminals and received and responded to petitions.

== Lord President of the Privy Council ==
The President of the Privy Council was one of the Great Officers of State in Scotland. The Lord Chancellor presided over the Council ex officio, but in 1610 James VI decreed that the President of the College of Justice should preside in the Chancellor's absence, and by 1619 the additional title of President of the Privy Council had been added. The two presidencies were separated in 1626 as part of Charles I's reorganisation of the Privy Council and Court of Session. The Lord President of the council was accorded precedence as one of the King's chief officers in 1661, but appeared in the Estates of Parliament only intermittently.

- 1625: John Graham, 4th Earl of Montrose
- 1649: John Campbell, 1st Earl of Loudoun
- 1660: John Leslie, 1st Duke of Rothes
- 1663: John Hay, 2nd Earl of Tweeddale
- 1672: John Maitland, 1st Duke of Lauderdale
- 1681: George Gordon, 1st Earl of Aberdeen
- 1682: James Graham, 3rd Marquess of Montrose
- 1686: William Douglas, 1st Duke of Queensberry, (questioned)
- 1689: William Lindsay, 18th Earl of Crawford
- 1692: William Johnstone, 1st Marquess of Annandale
- 1695: George Melville, 1st Earl of Melville
- 1702: William Johnstone, 1st Marquess of Annandale
- 1704: James Graham, 1st Duke of Montrose
- 1705: William Johnstone, 1st Marquess of Annandale
- 1706: James Graham, 1st Duke of Montrose

office abolished in 1708 by Union with Scotland (Amendment ) Act 1707.

== See also ==
- Privy Council
- Category:Members of the Privy Council of Scotland
