= Act of Proscription 1746 =

Act of the Parliament of Great Britain

Disarming the Highlands, etc. Act 1745
- Act of Parliament
- Parliament of Great Britain
- Long title: An act for the more effectual disarming the highlands in Scotland; ... An act for the more effectual disarming the highlands in Scotland; and for the more effectual securing the peace of the said highlands; and for restraining the use of the highland dress; and for further indemnifying such persons as have acted in the defence of His Majesty's person and government, during the unnatural rebellion; and for indemnifying the judges and other officers of the court of judiciary in Scotland, for not performing the northern circuit in May, one thousand seven hundred and forty six; and for obliging the masters and teachers of private schools in Scotland, and chaplains, tutors and governors of children or youth, to take the oaths to his Majesty, his heirs and successors, and to register the same.
- Citation: 19 Geo. 2. c. 39
- Territorial extent: Scotland (Note: Preamble.)

Dates
- Royal assent: 12 August 1746
- Commencement: 1 August 1746 (Note: Section 1.)
- Repealed: 13 July 1871

Other legislation
- Repeals/revokes: Disarming Act 1715
- Amended by: Highlands Services Act 1715; Sales to the Crown Act 1746; Use of Highland Dress Act 1782; Statute Law Revision Act 1867
- Repealed by: Promissory Oaths Act 1871
- Relates to: Bail in Criminal Cases (Scotland) Act 1724; Heritable Jurisdictions (Scotland) Act 1746

Status: Repealed

Text of statute as originally enacted

The Act of Proscription (19 Geo. 2. c. 39), also called the Act of Proscription 1746 or the Disarming the Highlands, etc. Act 1745, was an act of the Parliament of Great Britain, which came into effect in Scotland on 1 August 1746. It was part of a series of efforts to assimilate the Scottish Highlands, ending their ability to revolt, and the first of the "King's laws" that sought to crush the clan system in the aftermath of the Jacobite rising of 1745. These laws were finally repealed on 1 July 1782.

== Penalties ==
It was mainly a restatement of the earlier Highlands Services Act 1715 (1 Geo. 1. St. 2. c. 54), but with more severe punishments which this time were rigorously enforced. Punishments started with fines, with jail until payment and possible forced conscription for late payment. Repeat offenders were "liable to be transported to any of his Majesty's plantations beyond the seas, there to remain for the space of seven years", effectively indentured servitude.

The penalties for wearing "highland clothing" as stated in the Dress Act 1746 (19 Geo. 2. c. 39) were "imprisonment, without bail, during the space of six months, and no longer; and being convicted for a second offence before a court of justiciary or at the circuits, shall be liable to be transported ..." No lesser penalties were allowed.

== Geographical coverage ==
The elements of the act relating to the proscription of arms applied to the Highlands of Scotland, i.e. the counties of Dunbarton, on the north side of the water of Leven, Stirling on the north side of the river of Forth, Perth, Kincardine, Aberdeen, Inverness, Nairn, Cromarty, Argyll, Forfar, Banff, Sutherland, Caithness, Elgin and Ross.

The act applied to the whole of Scotland.

== Sections of the act ==
A new section, which became known as the Dress Act (19 Geo. 2. c. 39), banned wearing of "the Highland Dress". Provision was also included to protect those involved in putting down the rebellion from lawsuits. Measures to prevent children from being "educated in disaffected or rebellious principles" included a requirement for school prayers for the King and royal family.

The most severe penalties, at a minimum six months' incarceration and transportation to a penal colony for a second offence, made these the most severe portion of this act.

== Following act ==
The act was followed by the Heritable Jurisdictions (Scotland) Act 1746 (20 Geo. 2. c. 43) which removed the authority the clan chieftains had enjoyed. Scottish heritable sheriffdoms reverted to the Crown, and other heritable jurisdictions, including regalities, came under the power of the courts.

== Subsequent developments ==
The whole act was repealed by section 1 of, and part I of schedule one to, the Promissory Oaths Act 1871 (34 & 35 Vict. c. 48), which came into force on 13 July 1871.
