= Safeguarding of Industries (Customs Duties) Act 1925 =

Act of the Parliament of the United Kingdom

Safeguarding of Industries (Customs Duties) Act 1925 (Note: Section 2(2).)
- Act of Parliament
- Parliament of the United Kingdom
- Long title: An Act to impose customs duties on certain goods with a view to the safeguarding of certain industries, and for purposes connected therewith.
- Citation: 15 & 16 Geo. 5. c. 79
- Territorial extent: United Kingdom

Dates
- Royal assent: 22 December 1925
- Commencement: 22 December 1925 (Note: The Acts of Parliament (Commencement) Act 1793.)
- Repealed: 23 May 1950
Other legislation
Repealed by	Statute Law Revision Act 1950

Status: Repealed

Text of statute as originally enacted

The Safeguarding of Industries (Customs Duties) Act 1925 (15 & 16 Geo. 5. c. 79) was an act of the Parliament of the United Kingdom that imposed duties on cutlery, gloves, and incandescent mantles imported into Britain. Collectively, these industries amounted to approximately 3% of Britain's manufacturing output. The duties were temporary, remaining in effect for five years, from December 1925 to December 1930. For cutlery and gloves, the duties were 33^{1/3}% ad valorem, while for incandescent mantles the duty was 6 shillings per gross. These import duties were applied upon the recommendation of committees convened by the Board of Trade, in accordance with the 'safeguarding of industries' procedure, set out in a government white paper in 1925.

Unlike the Safeguarding of Industries Act 1921 (11 & 12 Geo. 5. c. 47), which was primarily intended to protect industries significant to national security, the Safeguarding of Industries (Customs Duties) Act 1925 was motivated by rising unemployment in those industries to which it applied safeguarding duties. The 1925 act was the only piece of legislation solely arising out of the safeguarding of industries procedure. Other safeguarding duties were legislated as part of the Finance Acts of 1925-1928.
