= Trolleybuses in Hartlepool =

Public transport system in England

Hartlepool trolleybus system
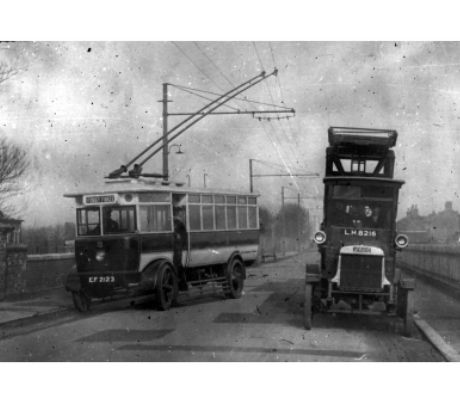
- A Hartlepool trolleybus and tower wagon, ca. 1924.

Operation
- Locale: Hartlepool and West Hartlepool, County Durham, England
- Open: 28 February 1924
- Close: 31 March 1953
- Status: Closed
- Routes: 4
- Owners: West Hartlepool Corporation; Hartlepool Corporation
- Operator: West Hartlepool Corporation

Infrastructure
- Stock: 48 (total); 31 (maximum)

The Hartlepool trolleybus system once served the town of West Hartlepool, and linked it with the town of Hartlepool, in County Durham, England. The two towns have since been fused.

== History ==
Opened on 28 February 1924, the Hartlepool system initially replaced the West Hartlepool portion of the Hartlepool Electric Tramways. That portion had been purchased by the West Hartlepool Corporation on 31 August 1912.

The first of the West Hartlepool tramways to be closed was the Foggy Furze line, which was shut down on 4 October 1923. The services on that line were temporarily replaced by motor buses, until opening of the trolleybus system. The Ward Jackson Park tramway was next to be closed, in November 1925.

Conversion of the tramway from West Hartlepool to Hartlepool was a more complex process, because the Hartlepool Corporation had obtained powers to run motor buses. Following lengthy negotiations, Hartlepool purchased the portion of the tramway within its boundaries, and, under the Hartlepool Corporation Trolley Vehicles Act 1926, was given powers to operate trolleybuses. Conversion of the West Hartlepool to Hartlepool line then took place on 22 February 1927.

One month later, on 25 March 1927, the Seaton Carew tramway was converted, bringing Hartlepool's tramway era to an end, and its trolleybus system to its greatest extent.

The system as a whole was operated by West Hartlepool Corporation. However, the route between the two towns was run on behalf of both authorities. The trolleybuses used on that route were jointly owned; each Corporation paid half the running costs of the joint route and was entitled to half of its revenue.

After the end of World War II, West Hartlepool Corporation decided to replace the trolleybus system with motor buses. In 1949, the Seaton Carew route was shut down. Closure of the other two West Hartlepool lines soon followed. Finally, on 31 March 1953, the joint route was closed.

== Services ==
By the standards of the various now defunct trolleybus systems in the United Kingdom, the Hartlepool system, with its four routes, was quite small.

== Fleet ==
West Hartlepool's first trolleybuses were four Railless 4-wheel vehicles with Short Brothers 36-seat bodywork. They were numbered 1–4. In 1926, they were joined by two similar vehicles (Nos. 5–6) and a double-deck version (No. 7).

The first jointly owned vehicles were twelve Straker-Clough single-deckers (Nos. 8–19). They entered service in 1927. In 1938, these vehicles were replaced by more jointly owned units, this time high capacity double-deckers (Nos. 32–39), built by Daimler. All of the jointly owned vehicles carried the armorial devices of the two Corporations on their side panels.

The system had a total fleet of 48 trolleybuses, with a maximum of 31 in service at any one time. None of them is recorded as having survived.

== See also ==
- History of Hartlepool
- Transport in Hartlepool
- List of trolleybus systems in the United Kingdom
