= Disarming Act 1715 =

Act of the Parliament of Great Britain

Highlands Services Act 1715 (Note: The citation of this act by this short title was authorised by section 1 of, and the first schedule to, the Short Titles Act 1896. Due to the repeal of those provisions it is now authorised by section 19(2) of the Interpretation Act 1978.)
- Act of Parliament
- Parliament of Great Britain
- Long title: An act for the more effectual securing the peace of the highlands in Scotland.
- Citation: 1 Geo. 1. St. 2. c. 54
- Territorial extent: Great Britain

Dates
- Royal assent: 26 June 1716
- Commencement: 1 November 1716 (Note: Section 1.)
- Repealed: 13 March 1975
Other legislation
Amended by	Statute Law Revision Act 1867; Statute Law Revision Act 1888
Repealed by	Statute Law (Repeals) Act 1975
Relates to	Bail in Criminal Cases (Scotland) Act 1724

Status: Repealed

Text of statute as originally enacted

The Highlands Services Act 1715, also known as the Disarming Act 1715 (1 Geo. 1. St. 2. c. 54), was an act of the Parliament of Great Britain that was enacted to curtail Jacobitism among the Scottish clans in the Scottish Highlands after the Jacobite rising of 1715. The new law, which came into effect on 1 November 1716, aimed at "securing the peace of the highlands in Scotland". It outlawed anyone in defined parts of Scotland from having "in his or their custody, use, or bear, broad sword, poignard, whinger, or durk, side pistol, gun, or other warlike weapon" unless authorised.

However, the act proved ineffectual at enforcing the ban. In 1725, a new act was passed with the intention of "disarming the highlands in that part of Great Britain called Scotland; and for the better securing the peace and quiet of that part of the kingdom". This new law was enforced by Major-General George Wade, who used it to successfully confiscate a significant number of weapons. The success of Wade's efforts was proven by the number of antiquated weapons utilised by Jacobites who answered the call when Charles Edward Stuart began the Jacobite rising of 1745 at Glenfinnan. Nevertheless, the Jacobite Army quickly acquired many Brown Bess muskets and bayonets after their victory at the Battle of Prestonpans.

== Subsequent developments ==
The main articles of the act were further strengthened in the Act of Proscription 1746 (19 Geo. 2. c. 39) following the defeat of Bonnie Prince Charlie at the Battle of Culloden in 1746.

The whole act was repealed by section 1(1) of, and part XIV of the schedule to, the Statute Law (Repeals) Act 1975, which came into force on 13 March 1975.
