= Coal Commission (United Kingdom) =

UK government agency

The Coal Commission was a United Kingdom government agency, created to own and manage coal reserves. It was set up in 1938 and ceased to operate on 1 January 1947.

== History ==
The Commission was constituted under the Coal Act 1938. The Act provided for the vesting in the Commission, from 1 July 1942, of the ownership of all coal (and certain, i.e. some, associated minerals and rights). Subject to the provisions of the Act, the Commissioners were charged to exercise their functions as owners "in such manner as they may think best for promoting the interests, efficiency and better organisation of the coal-mining industry."

The aggregate amount of compensation to be payable by the Commission for coal and coal-rights was fixed by the Act at £66,450,000, with additional sums for other associated property and rights. Valuation of separate coal holdings (as registered under the Coal (Registration of Ownership) Act 1937) was carried out by Valuation Boards appointed by the Board of Trade.

The Commissioners were charged with duties of promoting amalgamations of colliery-undertakings in any area in which they considered the number of separate undertakings to be so great as to be detrimental to the efficient working, treating or disposing of coal.

The chairman of the Commission was Sir Ernest Gowers and the secretary and controller was Christopher Hurst.

The Coal Act 1938 was superseded by the Coal Industry Nationalisation Act 1946 and the Commission was subsumed into the National Coal Board (later the British Coal Corporation). Coal reserves are today owned and managed by its successor body, the Coal Authority.

== Sources ==
- Whitaker's Almanack 1942
- Whitaker's Almanack 2002
