= List of acts of the Parliament of the United Kingdom from 1938 =

This is a complete list of acts of the Parliament of the United Kingdom for the year 1938.

Note that the first parliament of the United Kingdom was held in 1801; parliaments between 1707 and 1800 were either parliaments of Great Britain or of Ireland). For acts passed up until 1707, see the list of acts of the Parliament of England and the list of acts of the Parliament of Scotland. For acts passed from 1707 to 1800, see the list of acts of the Parliament of Great Britain. See also the list of acts of the Parliament of Ireland.

For acts of the devolved parliaments and assemblies in the United Kingdom, see the list of acts of the Scottish Parliament, the list of acts of the Northern Ireland Assembly, and the list of acts and measures of Senedd Cymru; see also the list of acts of the Parliament of Northern Ireland.

The number shown after each act's title is its chapter number. Acts passed before 1963 are cited using this number, preceded by the year(s) of the reign during which the relevant parliamentary session was held; thus the Union with Ireland Act 1800 is cited as "39 & 40 Geo. 3 c. 67", meaning the 67th act passed during the session that started in the 39th year of the reign of George III and which finished in the 40th year of that reign. Note that the modern convention is to use Arabic numerals in citations (thus "41 Geo. 3" rather than "41 Geo. III"). Acts of the last session of the Parliament of Great Britain and the first session of the Parliament of the United Kingdom are both cited as "41 Geo. 3". Acts passed from 1963 onwards are simply cited by calendar year and chapter number.

== 1 & 2 Geo. 6 ==
Continuing the third session of the 37th Parliament of the United Kingdom, which met from 26 October 1937 until 4 November 1938.

This session was also traditionally cited as 1 & 2 G. 6.

=== Public general acts ===
Short title	Citation	Royal assent
Long title
Unemployment Insurance Act 1938 (repealed)	1 & 2 Geo. 6. c. 8	17 February 1938
An Act to extend the powers of education authorities with respect to courses of instruction provided under the Unemployment Insurance Act, 1935; (Note: Unemployment Insurance Act 1935 (25 & 26 Geo. 5. c. 8)) to render certain employments insurable in like manner as employment in agriculture; to amend the provisions of the said Act relating to the discharge of the liabilities of the Unemployment Fund and to Treasury advances to that Fund; and to amend the law as to the insurance of discharged seamen, marines, soldiers and airmen. (Repealed for Northern Ireland by National Insurance Act (Northern Ireland) 1946 (c. 23 (N.I.)) and for England and Wales and Scotland by Statute Law (Repeals) Act 1978 (c. 45))
Consolidated Fund (No. 1) Act 1938 (repealed)	1 & 2 Geo. 6. c. 9	30 March 1938
An Act to apply certain sums out of the Consolidates Fund to the service of the years ending on the thirty-first day of March, one thousand nine hundred and thirty-seven, one thousand nine hundred and thirty-eight and one thousand nine hundred and thirty-nine. (Repealed by Statute Law Revision Act 1950 (14 Geo. 6. c. 6))
Dominica Act 1938 (repealed)	1 & 2 Geo. 6. c. 10	30 March 1938
An Act to provide for the separation of Dominica from the Leeward Islands, and for purposes connected therewith. (Repealed by West Indies Act 1962 (10 & 11 Eliz. 2. c. 19))
Blind Persons Act 1938 (repealed)	1 & 2 Geo. 6. c. 11	30 March 1938
An Act to lower from fifty years to forty years, the age which blind persons must have attained in order to be entitled to old age pensions under the Old Age Pensions Act, 1936; (Note: Old Age Pensions Act 1936 (26 Geo. 5 & 1 Edw. 8. c. 31)) and to amend the law with respect to the provision of assistance in relation to such persons by local authorities. (Repealed by Ministry of Social Security Act 1966 (c. 20))
Population (Statistics) Act 1938	1 & 2 Geo. 6. c. 12	30 March 1938
An Act to make further provision for obtaining statistical information with respect to the population of Great Britain; and for purposes connected therewith.
Superannuation (Various Services) Act 1938	1 & 2 Geo. 6. c. 13	30 March 1938
An Act to extend the powers conferred by certain enactments relating to superannuation so as to include power to grant the like superannuation benefits, and to permit the like allocation of superannuation benefits to spouses and dependants, as could be granted or permitted in respect of persons in the Civil Service of the State; to provide for distribution without probate of sums not exceeding one hundred pounds due to persons to whom those enactments apply or their legal personal representatives; and for purposes connected with the matters aforesaid.
National Health Insurance (Amendment) Act 1938 (repealed)	1 & 2 Geo. 6. c. 14	30 March 1938
An Act to amend the National Health Insurance Act, 1936, in relation to persons who are, or who since the first day of August nineteen hundred and thirty-five have been, employed in the manner mentioned in subsection (2) of section two of that Act; and to make consequential amendments in the Widows', Orphans' and Old Age Contributory Pensions Act, 1936. (Note: Widows', Orphans' and Old Age Contributory Pensions Act 1936 (26 Geo. 5 & 1 Edw. 8. c. 33)) (Repealed for England and Wales and Scotland by National Insurance Act 1946 (9 & 10 Geo. 6. c. 67) and for Northern Ireland by National Insurance Act (Northern Ireland) 1946 (c. 23 (N.I.)))
Cotton Industry Act 1938 (repealed)	1 & 2 Geo. 6. c. 15	30 March 1938
An Act to prolong the duration of provisions of the Cotton Industry Acts, 1923 to 1933, which would otherwise expire. (Repealed by Statute Law Revision Act 1950 (14 Geo. 6. c. 6))
Housing (Financial Provisions) Act 1938 (repealed)	1 & 2 Geo. 6. c. 16	30 March 1938
An Act to amend the law with respect to the making of contributions out of the Exchequer and by local authorities in respect of housing accommodation provided for the working classes, and with respect to arrangements between local authorities and other persons for the provision of housing accommodation; and for purposes connected with the matters aforesaid. (Repealed by Housing (Financial Provisions) Act 1958 (6 & 7 Eliz. 2. c. 42))
Cinematograph Films Act 1938 (repealed)	1 & 2 Geo. 6. c. 17	30 March 1938
An Act to make further provision for securing the renting and exhibition of a certain proportion of British cinematograph films, and for restricting blind booking and advance booking of cinematograph films; to make provision as to the wages and conditions of employment of persons employed by makers of cinematograph films; and to provide for purposes connected with the matters aforesaid. (Repealed by Films Act 1960 (8 & 9 Eliz. 2. c. 57))
Land Tax Commissioners Act 1938 (repealed)	1 & 2 Geo. 6. c. 18	13 April 1938
An Act to appoint additional commissioners for executing the Acts granting a land tax. (Repealed by Statute Law Revision Act 1964 (c. 79))
Rating and Valuation (Postponement of Valuations) Act 1938 (repealed)	1 & 2 Geo. 6. c. 19	13 April 1938
An Act to postpone the making of certain new valuation lists under the Rating and Valuation Act, 1925, (Note: Rating and Valuation Act 1925 (15 & 16 Geo. 5. c. 90)) and for purposes connected therewith. (Repealed by Local Government Act 1948 (11 & 12 Geo. 6. c. 26))
Army and Air Force (Annual) Act 1938 (repealed)	1 & 2 Geo. 6. c. 20	13 April 1938
An Act to provide, during twelve months, for the discipline and regulation of the Army and the Air Force. (Repealed by Statute Law Revision Act 1950 (14 Geo. 6. c. 6), Statute Law Revision Act 1953 (2 & 3 Eliz. 2. c. 5) and Revision of the Army and Air Force Acts (Transitional Provisions) Act 1955 (3 & 4 Eliz. 2. c. 20))
Dogs Amendment Act 1938 (repealed)	1 & 2 Geo. 6. c. 21	13 April 1938
An Act to amend the Dogs Act, 1871. (Note: Dogs Act 1871 (34 & 35 Vict. c. 56)) (Repealed by Dangerous Dogs Act 1989 (c. 30))
Trade Marks Act 1938 (repealed)	1 & 2 Geo. 6. c. 22	13 April 1938
An Act to consolidate the Trade Marks Act, 1905, (Note: Trade Marks Act 1905 (5 Edw. 7. c. 15)) the Trade Marks Act, 1919, (Note: Trade Marks Act 1919 (9 & 10 Geo. 5. c. 79)) and the Trade Marks (Amendment) Act, 1937. (Note: Trade Marks (Amendment) Act 1937 (1 Edw. 8. & 1 Geo. 6. c. 49)) (Repealed by Trade Marks Act 1994 (c. 26))
Poor Law (Amendment) Act 1938 (repealed)	1 & 2 Geo. 6. c. 23	17 May 1938
An Act to authorise the payment by Poor Law authorities of personal allowances to inmates of the age of sixty-five and over of Poor Law institutions. (Repealed by National Assistance Act 1948 (11 & 12 Geo. 6. c. 29))
Conveyancing Amendment (Scotland) Act 1938	1 & 2 Geo. 6. c. 24	17 May 1938
An Act to amend the law of conveyancing in Scotland.
Eire (Confirmation of Agreements) Act 1938 (repealed)	1 & 2 Geo. 6. c. 25	17 May 1938
An Act to confirm and give effect to certain agreements as to the relations between the United Kingdom and Eire. (Repealed by Statute Law (Repeals) Act 1981 (c. 19))
Increase of Rent and Mortgage Interest (Restrictions) Act 1938 (repealed)	1 & 2 Geo. 6. c. 26	26 May 1938
An Act to amend and continue the Rent and Mortgage Interest Restrictions Acts, 1920 to 1935. (Repealed for England and Wales by Rent Act 1968 (c. 23) and for Scotland by Rent (Scotland) Act 1971 (c. 28))
Workmen's Compensation (Amendment) Act 1938 (repealed)	1 & 2 Geo. 6. c. 27	26 May 1938
An Act to amend subsection (1) of section three, and subsection (2) of section five, of the Workmen's Compensation Act, 1925, (Note: Workmen's Compensation Act 1925 (15 & 16 Geo. 5. c. 84)) with respect to persons engaged in plying for hire with any vehicle or vessel the use of which is obtained under a contract of bailment; and for purposes connected therewith. (Repealed by National Insurance (Industrial Injuries) Act 1946 (9 & 10 Geo. 6. c. 62))
Evidence Act 1938	1 & 2 Geo. 6. c. 28	26 May 1938
An Act to amend the Law of Evidence.
Patents &c. (International Conventions) Act 1938 (repealed)	1 & 2 Geo. 6. c. 29	26 May 1938
An Act to give effect to an International Convention for the Protection of Industrial Property and to amend the provisions of the Patents and Designs Acts, 1907 to 1932, relating to matters affected by the said Convention; and to give effect to an International Agreement regarding false indications of origin on goods and to amend the provisions of the Merchandise Marks Acts, 1887 to 1926, relating to matters affected by the said Agreement. (Repealed by Patents, Designs and Marks Act 1986 (c. 39))
Sea Fish Industry Act 1938	1 & 2 Geo. 6. c. 30	2 June 1938
An Act to make provision for the better organisation of the white fish industry; to amend the Sea-Fishing Industry Act, 1933, (Note: Sea-Fishing Industry Act 1933 (23 & 24 Geo. 5. c. 45)) the Whaling Industry (Regulation) Act, 1934, (Note: Whaling Industry (Regulation) Act 1934 (24 & 25 Geo. 5. c. 49)) Part IV of the Merchant Shipping Act, 1894, (Note: Merchant Shipping Act 1894 (57 & 58 Vict. c. 60)) and other enactments relating to sea fisheries; and to make provision for purposes connected with the matters aforesaid.
Scottish Land Court Act 1938 (repealed)	1 & 2 Geo. 6. c. 31	2 June 1938
An Act to make provision with regard to the tenure of office and superannuation of members of the Scottish Land Court. (Repealed by Scottish Land Court Act 1993 (c. 45))
Prevention and Treatment of Blindness (Scotland) Act 1938 (repealed)	1 & 2 Geo. 6. c. 32	23 June 1938
An Act to enable local authorities in Scotland to make arrangements for the prevention and treatment of blindness. (Repealed by National Health Service (Scotland) Act 1947 (10 & 11 Geo. 6. c. 27))
Air Navigation (Financial Provisions) Act 1938 (repealed)	1 & 2 Geo. 6. c. 33	23 June 1938
An Act to increase the maximum amount which may be paid annually by way of subsidies under section one of the Air Navigation Act, 1936; (Note: Air Navigation Act 1936 (26 Geo. 5 & 1 Edw. 8. c. 44)) and to make provision with respect to the remuneration and expenses of, and the fees received by, any licensing authority which may be constituted under section five of that Act. (Repealed by Civil Aviation Act 1949 (12, 13 & 14 Geo. 6. c. 67))
Leasehold Property (Repairs) Act 1938	1 & 2 Geo. 6. c. 34	23 June 1938
An Act to amend the law as to the enforcement by landlords of obligations to repair and similar obligations arising under leases.
Housing (Rural Workers) Amendment Act 1938 (repealed)	1 & 2 Geo. 6. c. 35	23 June 1938
An Act to amend the Housing (Rural Workers) Acts, 1926 (Note: Housing (Rural Workers) Act 1926 (16 & 17 Geo. 5. c. 56)) and 1931. (Note: Housing (Rural Workers) Amendment Act 1931 (21 & 22 Geo. 5. c. 22)) (Repealed for England and Wales by Housing Finance Act 1972 (c. 47) and for Scotland by Housing (Financial Provisions) (Scotland) Act 1972 (c. 46))
Infanticide Act 1938	1 & 2 Geo. 6. c. 36	23 June 1938
An Act to repeal and re-enact with modifications the provisions of the Infanticide Act, 1922. (Note: Infanticide Act 1922 (12 & 13 Geo. 5. c. 18))
Street Playgrounds Act 1938 (repealed)	1 & 2 Geo. 6. c. 37	13 July 1938
An Act to empower local authorities to close streets to enable them to be used as playgrounds for children. (Repealed by Road Traffic Act 1960 (8 & 9 Eliz. 2. c. 16))
Housing (Agricultural Population) (Scotland) Act 1938 (repealed)	1 & 2 Geo. 6. c. 38	13 July 1938
An Act to authorise the giving of financial assistance towards the expenses incurred by local authorities in providing housing accommodation for the agricultural population; to promote the provision of new housing accommodation to replace accommodation which is occupied by members of the agricultural population and is unfit for human habitation or overcrowded; to amend the provisions of the Housing (Scotland) Acts, 1925 to 1935, relating to charging orders, insanitary dwelling-houses, the recovery of expenses by instalments, the provision of water-closets, and the making of byelaws as to accommodation for seasonal workers; to amend the provisions of section one hundred and twenty-five of the Public Health (Scotland) Act, 1897; (Note: Public Health (Scotland) Act 1897 (60 & 61 Vict. c. 38)) to authorise the making of byelaws with respect to premises used for the accommodation of agricultural workers; and for purposes connected with the matters aforesaid. (Repealed by Housing (Financial Provisions) (Scotland) Act 1972 (c. 46))
Welsh Church (Amendment) Act 1938	1 & 2 Geo. 6. c. 39	13 July 1938
An Act to amend paragraph (b) of subsection (1) of section nineteen of the Welsh Church Act, 1914. (Note: Welsh Church Act 1914 (4 & 5 Geo. 5. c. 91))
Children and Young Persons Act 1938 (repealed)	1 & 2 Geo. 6. c. 40	13 July 1938
An Act to extend the powers of courts of summary jurisdiction as to the making of orders for the protection, custody, supervision and care of children and young persons, and for their temporary detention; to make further provision as to children and young persons in respect of whom such orders are made; and to amend the law as to the constitution of juvenile courts in the Metropolitan police court area. (Repealed by Children and Young Persons Act 1969 (c. 54))
Baking Industry (Hours of Work) Act 1938 (repealed)	1 & 2 Geo. 6. c. 41	13 July 1938
An Act to restrict night work in the baking industry, and for purposes connected therewith. (Repealed by Baking Industry (Hours of Work) Act 1954 (2 & 3 Eliz. 2. c. 57))
Herring Industry Act 1938 (repealed)	1 & 2 Geo. 6. c. 42	13 July 1938
An Act to amend the Herring Industry Act, 1935, (Note: Herring Industry Act 1935 (25 & 26 Geo. 5. c. 9)) to authorise the giving of further financial assistance to the Herring Industry Board and to herring fishermen, and for purposes connected with the matters aforesaid. (Repealed by Sea Fish Industry Act 1970 (c. 11))
Mental Deficiency Act 1938 (repealed)	1 & 2 Geo. 6. c. 43	13 July 1938
An Act to extend by one month the time within which the Board of Control are required by section eleven of the Mental Deficiency Act, 1913, (Note: Mental Deficiency Act 1913 (3 & 4 Geo. 5. c. 28)) to determine whether orders made under that Act are to be continued; and to validate orders purporting to have been continued under that section. (Repealed by Mental Health Act 1959 (7 & 8 Eliz. 2. c. 72))
Road Haulage Wages Act 1938 (repealed)	1 & 2 Geo. 6. c. 44	13 July 1938
An Act to make provision with respect to the remuneration of persons employed in connection with the mechanical transport of goods by road, and with respect to the making of recommendations and reports, and the settlement of disputes, relating to matters affecting such transport. (Repealed by Employment Act 1980 (c. 42))
Inheritance (Family Provision) Act 1938 (repealed)	1 & 2 Geo. 6. c. 45	13 July 1938
An Act to amend the law relating to testamentary dispositions; and for other purposes connected therewith. (Repealed by Inheritance (Provision for Family and Dependants) Act 1975 (c. 63))
Finance Act 1938	1 & 2 Geo. 6. c. 46	29 July 1938
An Act to grant certain duties of Customs and Inland Revenue (including Excise), to alter other duties, and to amend the law relating to Customs and Inland Revenue (including Excise) and the National Debt, and to make further provision in connection with finance.
Appropriation Act 1938 (repealed)	1 & 2 Geo. 6. c. 47	29 July 1938
An Act to apply a sum out of the Consolidated Fund to the service of the year ending on the thirty-first day of March, one thousand nine hundred and thirty-nine, and to appropriate the Supplies granted in this Session of Parliament. (Repealed by Statute Law Revision Act 1950 (14 Geo. 6. c. 6))
Criminal Procedure (Scotland) Act 1938 (repealed)	1 & 2 Geo. 6. c. 48	29 July 1938
An Act to amend the law of Scotland relating to criminal procedure and to the crime of incest, and to the duties of procurators fiscal in relation to fatal accident inquiries. (Repealed by Incest and Related Offences (Scotland) Act 1986 (c. 36))
War Department Property Act 1938 (repealed)	1 & 2 Geo. 6. c. 49	29 July 1938
An Act to enable the Secretary of State for War to delegate the function of executing instruments relating to the acquisition, management and disposal of property. (Repealed by Defence (Transfer of Functions) (No. 1) Order 1964 (SI 1964/488))
Divorce (Scotland) Act 1938 (repealed)	1 & 2 Geo. 6. c. 50	29 July 1938
An Act to amend the law of Scotland with regard to divorce and dissolution of marriage. (Repealed by Divorce Jurisdiction, Court Fees and Legal Aid (Scotland) Act 1983 (c. 12))
Essential Commodities Reserves Act 1938	1 & 2 Geo. 6. c. 51	29 July 1938
An Act to enable the Board of Trade to obtain information as to commodities which in the opinion of the Board would be essential for the vital needs of the community in the event of war and to make provision for the maintenance of reserves of such commodities; and for purposes connected with the matters aforesaid.
Coal Act 1938	1 & 2 Geo. 6. c. 52	29 July 1938
An Act to make provision for the acquisition of the property in all unworked coal and mines of coal and in certain associated minerals, and of certain associated property and rights in land, by a Commission with power of management thereover; for amending the enactments relating to facilities for the working of minerals; for empowering the commission to promote a reduction in the number of coal-mining undertakings; for continuing Part I of the Coal Mines Act, 1930, (Note: Coal Mines Act 1930 (20 & 21 Geo. 5. c. 34)) and for amending the provisions thereof with respect to committees of investigation; for enabling land to be acquired compulsorily for the purposes of the miners welfare committee; and for purposes connected with the matters aforesaid.
Hire-Purchase Act 1938 (repealed)	1 & 2 Geo. 6. c. 53	29 July 1938
An Act to amend the law with respect to the hire purchase and sale upon credit of goods and the law of distress in its relation thereto. (Repealed for England and Wales by Hire-Purchase Act 1965 (c. 66) and for Scotland by Hire-Purchase (Scotland) Act 1965 (c. 67))
Architects Registration Act 1938 (repealed)	1 & 2 Geo. 6. c. 54	29 July 1938
An Act to restrict the use of the name Architect to Registered Architect, and to extend the time within which practising architects may apply for registration. (Repealed by Architects Act 1997 (c. 22))
Registration of Still-Births (Scotland) Act 1938 (repealed)	1 & 2 Geo. 6. c. 55	29 July 1938
An Act to provide for the registration of still-births in Scotland. (Repealed by Registration of Births, Deaths and Marriages (Scotland) Act 1965 (c. 49))
Food and Drugs Act 1938 (repealed)	1 & 2 Geo. 6. c. 56	29 July 1938
An Act to consolidate with amendments certain enactments relating to food, drugs, markets, slaughter-houses and knackers' yards. (Repealed for England and Wales by Food and Drugs Act 1955 (4 & 5 Eliz. 2. c. 16) and for Scotland by Food and Drugs (Scotland) Act 1956 (4 & 5 Eliz. 2. c. 30))
Imperial Telegraphs Act 1938	1 & 2 Geo. 6. c. 57	29 July 1938
An Act to enable the Treasury and the Postmaster-General to carry out certain arrangements made by His Majesty's Government in the United Kingdom with Cable and Wireless Limited, and in connection with those arrangements to amend the law with respect to the calculation of the Post Office net surplus; and for purposes connected with the matters aforesaid.
Chimney Sweepers Acts (Repeal) Act 1938 (repealed)	1 & 2 Geo. 6. c. 58	29 July 1938
An Act to repeal the Chimney Sweepers and Chimneys Regulation Acts, 1840 (Note: Chimney Sweepers and Chimneys Regulation Act 1840 (3 & 4 Vict. c. 85)) and 1864, (Note: Chimney Sweepers Regulation Act 1864 (27 & 28 Vict. c. 37)) the Chimney Sweepers Act, 1875, (Note: Chimney Sweepers Act 1875 (38 & 39 Vict. c. 70)) and the Chimney Sweepers Act, 1894. (Note: Chimney Sweepers Act 1894 (57 & 58 Vict. c. 51)) (Repealed by Statute Law Revision Act 1950 (14 Geo. 6. c. 6))
Local Government (Hours of Poll) Act 1938 (repealed)	1 & 2 Geo. 6. c. 59	29 July 1938
An Act to provide for the extension of polling hours at county council and borough council elections. (Repealed by Representation of the People Act 1949 (12, 13 & 14 Geo. 6. c. 68))
Anglo-Turkish (Armaments Credit) Agreement Act 1938 (repealed)	1 & 2 Geo. 6. c. 60	29 July 1938
An Act to confirm and give effect to an agreement made between His Majesty's Government in the United Kingdom and the Government of the Turkish Republic; and for purposes connected with the matters aforesaid. (Repealed by National Loans Act 1968 (c. 13))
Milk (Extension and Amendment) Act 1938 (repealed)	1 & 2 Geo. 6. c. 61	29 July 1938
An Act to extend certain temporary provisions of the Milk Acts, 1934 to 1937; to release milk marketing Boards and the Government of Northern Ireland from certain obligations under those Acts; and for purposes connected with the matters aforesaid. (Repealed by Statute Law Revision Act 1950 (14 Geo. 6. c. 6))
British Museum Act 1938 (repealed)	1 & 2 Geo. 6. c. 62	29 July 1938
An Act to enable the Trustees of the British Museum to accept a certain bequest made to them by the late Lord Rothschild; and for purposes connected therewith. (Repealed by British Museum Act 1963 (c. 24))
Administration of Justice (Miscellaneous Provisions) Act 1938 (repealed)	1 & 2 Geo. 6. c. 63	29 July 1938
An Act to amend the law with respect to assizes and to quarter sessions and with respect to proceedings heretofore usually dealt with on the Crown side of the King's Bench Division of the High Court; to enable effect to be given to international conventions affecting English Courts; to extend the jurisdiction of county courts and to amend the Supreme Court of Judicature (Consolidation) Act, 1925, (Note: Supreme Court of Judicature (Consolidation) Act 1925 (15 & 16 Geo. 5. c. 49)) and the County Courts Act, 1934; (Note: County Courts Act 1934 (24 & 25 Geo. 5. c. 53)) to amend the law relating to appeals from the Mayor's and City of London Court; and for purposes connected with the matters aforesaid. (Repealed by Senior Courts Act 1981 (c. 54))
Naval Discipline (Amendment) Act 1938 (repealed)	1 & 2 Geo. 6. c. 64	29 July 1938
An Act to provide for subjecting to naval discipline certain persons who engage with the Admiralty to serve His Majesty in ships and agree to become subject to the Naval Discipline Act; (Note: Naval Discipline Act 1866 (29 & 30 Vict. c. 109)) and for purposes connected with the matter aforesaid. (Repealed by Naval Discipline Act 1957 (5 & 6 Eliz. 2. c. 53))
Rating and Valuation (Air-Raid Works) Act 1938 (repealed)	1 & 2 Geo. 6. c. 65	29 July 1938
An Act to provide for relief from rates in respect of air-raid protection works. (Repealed by General Rate Act 1967 (c. 9))
Rating and Valuation (Air Raid Works) (Scotland) Act 1938	1 & 2 Geo. 6. c. 66	29 July 1938
An Act to provide for relief from rates in respect of air-raid protection works in Scotland.
Supreme Court of Judicature (Amendment) Act 1938 (repealed)	1 & 2 Geo. 6. c. 67	29 July 1938
An Act to amend the provisions of the Supreme Court of Judicature (Consolidation) Act, 1925, relating to the number of judges of the Court of Appeal, the performance by such judges of the functions of judges of the High Court, and the filling of vacancies among judges of the Chancery Division. (Repealed by Senior Courts Act 1981 (c. 54))
Isle of Man (Customs) Act 1938 (repealed)	1 & 2 Geo. 6. c. 68	29 July 1938
An Act to amend the law with respect to customs in the Isle of Man. (Repealed for the Isle of Man by Customs and Excise Legislation (Application) Order 1976 (GC No 1/76))
Young Persons (Employment) Act 1938 (repealed)	1 & 2 Geo. 6. c. 69	29 July 1938
An Act to regulate the hours of employment of persons under the age of eighteen years employed in certain occupations; to amend the Shops Act, 1934, (Note: Shops Act 1934 (24 & 25 Geo. 5. c. 42)) with respect to the regulation of the hours of employment of persons under the age of sixteen years, and with respect to the determination of the number of working hours of persons under the age of eighteen years; and for purposes connected with the matters aforesaid. (Repealed by Employment Act 1989 (c. 38))
Holidays with Pay Act 1938 (repealed)	1 & 2 Geo. 6. c. 70	29 July 1938
An Act to enable wage regulating authorities to make provision for holidays and holiday remuneration for workers whose wages they regulate, and to enable the Minister of Labour to assist voluntary schemes for securing holidays with pay for workers in any industry. (Repealed by Statute Law (Repeals) Act 2004 (c. 14))
Bacon Industry Act 1938 (repealed)	1 & 2 Geo. 6. c. 71	29 July 1938
An Act to provide for the better organisation of the bacon industry and the pig producing industry and in that connection to provide for payments out of and into the Exchequer, and the continuance of the regulation of imports; and for purposes connected with the matters aforesaid. (Repealed by Agriculture Act 1957 (5 & 6 Eliz. 2. c. 57))
Fire Brigades Act 1938 (repealed)	1 & 2 Geo. 6. c. 72	29 July 1938
An Act to make further provision for fire services in Great Britain and for purposes connected therewith. (Repealed by Fire Services Act 1947 (10 & 11 Geo. 6. c. 41))
Nursing Homes Registration (Scotland) Act 1938 (repealed)	1 & 2 Geo. 6. c. 73	29 July 1938
An Act to provide for the registration and inspection of nursing homes in Scotland and for purposes connected therewith. (Repealed by Regulation of Care (Scotland) Act 2001 (asp 8))

=== Local acts ===
Short title	Citation	Royal assent
Long title
Paisley Corporation (General Powers) Order Confirmation Act 1938	1 & 2 Geo. 6. c. vii	30 March 1938
An Act to confirm a Provisional Order under the Private Legislation Procedure (Scotland) Act 1936 (Note: Private Legislation Procedure (Scotland) Act 1936 (26 Geo. 5 & 1 Edw. 8. c. 52)) relating to Paisley Corporation.
	Paisley Corporation (General Powers) Order 1938 Provisional Order to authorise the provost magistrates and councillors of the burgh of Paisley to extend and define the limits of gas supply of the burgh and to confer further powers upon them in relation to their gas undertaking to borrow money to make further provision with respect to the local government and finance of the burgh and for other purposes.	
Ministry of Health Provisional Order Confirmation (Halifax) Act 1938 (repealed)	1 & 2 Geo. 6. c. viii	30 March 1938
An Act to confirm a Provisional Order of the Minister of Health relating to the county borough of Halifax. (Repealed by West Yorkshire Act 1980 (c. xiv))
	Halifax (Acquisition of land) Order 1937 (Note: Although passed in 1938, the short title is specified as the Halifax (Acquisition of land) Order 1937.) Provisional order to enable the council of the county borough of Halifax to purchase certain lands compulsorily.	
Ministry of Health Provisional Order Confirmation (Nuneaton Extension) Act 1938 (repealed)	1 & 2 Geo. 6. c. ix	30 March 1938
An Act to confirm a Provisional Order of the Minister of Health relating to the borough of Nuneaton. (Repealed by Statute Law (Repeals) Act 1995)
	Nuneaton (Extension) Order 1938 Provisional Order made in pursuance of the Local Government Act 1933 (Note: Local Government Act 1933 (23 & 24 Geo. 5. c. 51)) for altering borough boundaries.	
Bombay, Baroda and Central India Railway Act 1938 (repealed)	1 & 2 Geo. 6. c. x	30 March 1938
An Act to amend the Bombay, Baroda and Central India Railway Act Act 1906 (Note: Bombay, Baroda and Central India Railway Act 1906 (6 Edw. 7. c. lix)) and to enable the Bombay Baroda and Central India Railway Company to provide road and air transport services and for other purposes. (Repealed by Statute Law (Repeals) Act 2013 (c. 2))
Adelphi Estate Act 1938	1 & 2 Geo. 6. c. xi	30 March 1938
An Act to modify certain provisions of the Adelphi Estate Act 1933. (Note: Adelphi Estate Act 1933 (23 & 24 Geo. 5. c. lxxxviii))
Middlesex Hospital Act 1938 (repealed)	1 & 2 Geo. 6. c. xii	13 April 1938
An Act to confer powers on the president vice presidents treasurers and governors of the Middlesex Hospital and for other purposes. (Repealed by Statute Law (Repeals) Act 2013 (c. 2))
North West Midlands Joint Electricity Authority Order Confirmation Act 1938	1 & 2 Geo. 6. c. xiii	17 May 1938
An Act to confirm a Provisional Order made under section one of the Electricity (Supply) Act 1922 (Note: Electricity (Supply) Act 1922 (12 & 13 Geo. 5. c. 46)) relating to the North West Midlands Joint Electricity Authority.
	North West Midlands Joint Electricity Authority (Increase of Borrowing Powers) Order 1938 Order made by the Electricity Commissioners and confirmed by the Minister of Transport under the Electricity (Supply) Acts 1882 to 1936 for increasing the borrowing powers of the North West Midlands Joint Electricity Authority.	
Ministry of Health Provisional Order Confirmation (Scarborough) Act 1938	1 & 2 Geo. 6. c. xiv	17 May 1938
An Act to confirm a Provisional Order of the Minister of Health relating to the borough of Scarborough.
	Scarborough Order 1938 Provisional order to enable the council of the borough of Scarborough to purchase certain lands compulsorily.	
Ministry of Health Provisional Order Confirmation (Bridgwater Extension) Act 1938	1 & 2 Geo. 6. c. xv	17 May 1938
An Act to confirm a Provisional Order of the Minister of Health relating to the borough of Bridgwater.
	Bridgwater Extension Order 1938 Provisional Order made in pursuance of the Local Government Act 1933 for altering borough boundaries.	
Bournemouth Gas and Water Act 1938	1 & 2 Geo. 6. c. xvi	17 May 1938
An Act to provide for the transfer to the Bournemouth Gas and Water Company of the undertakings of the Brockenhurst Gas Company and the Wareham and District Gas Company Limited to extend the limits for the supply of gas by the Bournemouth Gas and Water Company to authorise them to raise additional capital and for other purposes.
Saltburn and Marske-by-Sea Urban District Council Act 1938	1 & 2 Geo. 6. c. xvii	17 May 1938
An Act to provide for the transfer to the urban district council of Saltburn and Marske-by-the-Sea of the Saltburn pier and works in connection therewith to confer other powers upon the Council and for other purposes.
Poor's Allotment in Hanwell Charity Scheme Confirmation Act 1938	1 & 2 Geo. 6. c. xviii	26 May 1938
An Act to confirm a Scheme of the Charity Commissioners for the application or management of the Charity called the Poor's Allotment in the ancient parish of Hanwell in the county of Middlesex.
	Scheme for the application or management of the Charity called the Poor's Allotment in the ancient parish of Hanwell in the county of Middlesex comprised in an Inclosure Award made pursuant to the Inclosure Act 53 Geo. III. cap. VI. (Private) (Note: Hanwell (Middlesex) Inclosure Act 1813 (53 Geo. 3. c. 6 Pr.)) and a Scheme of the Charity Commissioners of the first day of March one thousand nine hundred and seven.	
Forfar Corporation Water Order Confirmation Act 1938	1 & 2 Geo. 6. c. xix	26 May 1938
An Act to confirm a Provisional Order under the Private Legislation Procedure (Scotland) Act 1936 relating to Forfar Corporation Water.
	Forfar Corporation Water Order 1938 Provisional Order to authorise the provost magistrates and councillors of the royal burgh of Forfar to borrow additional money for their water undertaking and for other purposes.	
Irvine and District Water Board Order Confirmation Act 1938 (repealed)	1 & 2 Geo. 6. c. xx	26 May 1938
An Act to confirm a Provisional Order under the Private Legislation Procedure (Scotland) Act 1936 relating to Irvine and District Water Board. (Repealed by Irvine and District Water Board Order 1961 (SI 1961/872))
	Irvine and District Water Board Order 1938 Provisional Order to authorise the Irvine and District Water Board to construct additional waterworks and to borrow further moneys and for other purposes.	
Bournemouth Corporation (Trolley Vehicles) Order Confirmation Act 1938 (repealed)	1 & 2 Geo. 6. c. xxi	26 May 1938
An Act to confirm a Provisional Order made by the Minister of Transport under the Bournemouth Corporation Act 1930 (Note: Bournemouth Corporation Act 1930 (20 & 21 Geo. 5. c. clxxxi)) relating to Bournemouth trolley vehicles. (Repealed by Bournemouth Borough Council Act 1985 (c. v))
	Bournemouth Corporation (Trolley Vehicles) Order 1937 (Note: Although passed in 1938, the short title is specified as the Bournemouth Corporation (Trolley Vehicles) Order 1937.) Order authorising the mayor aldermen and burgesses of the borough of Bournemouth to work and use trolley vehicles upon additional routes in the borough of Bournemouth and in the borough of Christchurch.	
Blackpool Improvement Act 1938	1 & 2 Geo. 6. c. xxii	26 May 1938
An Act to provide for the carrying into effect of an agreement between the mayor aldermen and burgesses of the borough of Blackpool and the London Midland and Scottish Railway Company to provide for the removal of the Blackpool central railway station to another site in the said borough to empower the said mayor aldermen and burgesses to execute street improvements and other works and to acquire lands and for other purposes.
East Lothian Water Order Confirmation Act 1938 (repealed)	1 & 2 Geo. 6. c. xxiii	2 June 1938
An Act to confirm a Provisional Order under the Private Legislation Procedure (Scotland) Act 1936 relating to East Lothian Water. (Repealed by East Lothian Water Board Order 1956 (SI 1956/65))
	East Lothian Water Order 1938 Provisional Order to change the name of and re-constitute the East Lothian (Western District) Water Board to transfer to the Board the water undertakings of the town councils of the burghs of Dunbar East Linton Haddington and Tranent and of the county council of the county of East Lothian and part of the water undertaking of the town council of the burgh of North Berwick to extend the limits of supply of the Board to authorise the Board to construct additional waterworks; to confer further powers on the Board and for other purposes.	
Royal Sheffield Infirmary and Hospital Act 1938	1 & 2 Geo. 6. c. xxiv	2 June 1938
An Act to unite the Royal Infirmary Sheffield and the Sheffield Royal Hospital in one corporation to be called the Royal Sheffield Infirmary and Hospital and for other purposes.
Aldridge Urban District Council Act 1938 (repealed)	1 & 2 Geo. 6. c. xxv	2 June 1938
An Act to make further and better provision for the improvement health local government and finances of the urban district of Aldridge and for other purposes. (Repealed by West Midlands County Council Act 1980 (c. xi))
Brixham Gas and Electricity Act 1938	1 & 2 Geo. 6. c. xxvi	2 June 1938
An Act to authorise the Brixham Gas and Electricity Company to raise additional capital and for other purposes.
London, Midland and Scottish Railway Act 1938	1 & 2 Geo. 6. c. xxvii	2 June 1938
An Act to empower the London Midland and Scottish Railway Company to construct works and to acquire lands to amend the superannuation scheme of the Company and for other purposes.
Bangor Corporation Act 1938	1 & 2 Geo. 6. c. xxviii	2 June 1938
An Act to authorise the corporation of Bangor to suspend or modify the working of the ferry between Bangor Pier and Llandegfan to sell the pier undertaking to make better provision for the health local government and finance of the borough and for other purposes.
West Surrey Water Act 1938	1 & 2 Geo. 6. c. xxix	2 June 1938
An Act to authorise the West Surrey Water Company to take additional water from the river Thames and for other purposes.
Crewe Corporation Act 1938	1 & 2 Geo. 6. c. xxx	23 June 1938
An Act to empower the mayor aldermen and burgesses of the borough of Crewe to construct street works and waterworks and to empower the said mayor aldermen and burgesses to acquire lands for those and for other purposes to confer further powers on the Corporation with reference to the supply of water and electricity to make further provision for the improvement health local government and finance of the borough and for other purposes.
Radcliffe, Farnworth and District Gas Act 1938	1 & 2 Geo. 6. c. xxxi	23 June 1938
An Act to provide for the transfer of the undertaking of the Radcliffe and Little Lever Gas Joint Gas Board to the Farnworth and Kearsley Gas Company and for the dissolution of the Board; to change the name of the said Company; to consolidate the capital of the said Company; to extend the limits for the supply of gas by and to confer powers upon the said Company, and for other purposes.
Romford Gas Act 1938	1 & 2 Geo. 6. c. xxxii	23 June 1938
An Act to confer further powers on the Romford Gas Company and for other purposes.
Lee Conservancy Act 1938	1 & 2 Geo. 6. c. xxxiii	23 June 1938
An Act to make further provision with regard to the Lee Conservancy Board and to confer further powers upon that Board and for other purposes.
Irwell Valley Water Board Act 1938	1 & 2 Geo. 6. c. xxxiv	23 June 1938
An Act to confirm the purchase by the Irwell Valley Water Board of certain land; to empower the Board to construct waterworks and collect impound take and use waters; to confer further powers upon the Board, and for other purposes.
London County Council (Money) Act 1938 (repealed)	1 & 2 Geo. 6. c. xxxv	23 June 1938
An Act to regulate the expenditure on capital account and lending of money by the London County Council during the financial period from the first day of April one thousand nine hundred and thirty-eight to the thirtieth day of September one thousand nine hundred and thirty-nine and for other purposes. (Repealed by London County Council (Loans) Act 1955 (4 & 5 Eliz. 2. c. xxvi))
Ossett Corporation Act 1938 (repealed)	1 & 2 Geo. 6. c. xxxvi	23 June 1938
An Act to make further provision with respect to the undertakings of the Mayor Aldermen and Burgesses of the borough of Ossett and with respect to the finance of the said borough, and for other purposes. (Repealed by West Yorkshire Act 1980 (c. xiv))
Rickmansworth and Uxbridge Valley Water Act 1938	1 & 2 Geo. 6. c. xxxvii	23 June 1938
An Act to authorise the Rickmansworth and Uxbridge Valley Water Company to construct new works to make provision as to the abandonment of their Springwell pumping station and for other purposes.
London County Council (General Powers) Act 1938	1 & 2 Geo. 6. c. xxxviii	23 June 1938
An Act to confer powers upon the London County Council and other authorities; and for other purposes.
Manchester Corporation Act 1938	1 & 2 Geo. 6. c. xxxix	23 June 1938
An Act to empower the lord mayor aldermen and citizens of the city of Manchester to cover over part of the river Irwell and to acquire lands for their transport undertaking and for other purposes.
Wakefield Corporation Act 1938	1 & 2 Geo. 6. c. xl	23 June 1938
An Act to empower the Mayor Aldermen and Citizens of the city of Wakefield to construct new streets street improvements and waterworks and to acquire land for those and other purposes; to make further provision with regard to their water, electricity and markets undertakings and to make further provision with regard to the health, local government and improvement of the city; and for other purposes.
Plymouth Extension Act 1938 (repealed)	1 & 2 Geo. 6. c. xli	23 June 1938
An Act to extend the boundaries of the city of Plymouth; and for other purposes. (Repealed by Plymouth City Council Act 1987 (c. iv))
Gateshead Corporation Act 1938 (repealed)	1 & 2 Geo. 6. c. xlii	23 June 1938
An Act to make further provision for the improvement health local government and finance of the borough of Gateshead; and for other purposes. (Repealed by Tyne and Wear Act 1980 (c. xliii))
Post Offices (Sites) Act 1938	1 & 2 Geo. 6. c. xliii	13 July 1938
An Act to enable the Postmaster-General, for the purposes of the Post Office, to acquire lands in London, Leeds and Oxford, to stop up a highway in Leeds, and to erect buildings on, and make a subway under, a disused burial ground in Leeds, and for purposes connected with the matters aforesaid.
Dumbarton Burgh (Water) Order Confirmation Act 1938	1 & 2 Geo. 6. c. xliv	13 July 1938
An Act to confirm a Provisional Order under the Burgh Police (Scotland) Act, 1892, (Note: Burgh Police (Scotland) Act 1892 (55 & 56 Vict. c. 55)) relating to Dumbarton Burgh (Water).
	Dumbarton Burgh (Water) Order 1938	
Pier and Harbour Order (Clacton-on-Sea) Confirmation Act 1938	1 & 2 Geo. 6. c. xlv	13 July 1938
An Act to confirm a Provisional Order made by the Minister of Transport under the General Pier and Harbour Act, 1861, (Note: General Pier and Harbour Act 1861 (24 & 25 Vict. c. 45)) relating to Clacton-on-Sea.
	Clacton-on-Sea Pier Order 1938	
Provisional Order (Marriages) Confirmation Act 1938 (repealed)	1 & 2 Geo. 6. c. xlvi	13 July 1938
An Act to confirm a Provisional Order made by one of His Majesty's Order Principal Secretaries of State under the Marriages Validity (Provisional Orders) Acts, 1905 (Note: Provisional Order (Marriages) Act 1905 (5 Edw. 7. c. 23)) and 1924. (Note: Marriages Validity (Provisional Orders) Act 1924 (14 & 15 Geo. 5. c. 20)) (Repealed by Statute Law (Repeals) Act 1977 (c. 18))
Ministry of Health Provisional Order Confirmation (Keighley) Act 1938 (repealed)	1 & 2 Geo. 6. c. xlvii	13 July 1938
An Act to confirm a Provisional Order of the Minister of Health relating to the borough of Keighley. (Repealed by West Yorkshire Act 1980 (c. xiv))
	Keighley Order 1938	
Ministry of Health Provisional Order Confirmation (Cholderton and District Water) Act 1938	1 & 2 Geo. 6. c. xlviii	13 July 1938
An Act to confirm a Provisional Order of the Minister of Health relating to the Cholderton Water Company Limited.
	Cholderton and District Water Order 1938	
Ministry of Health Provisional Order Confirmation (Torquay) Act 1938	1 & 2 Geo. 6. c. xlix	13 July 1938
An Act to confirm a Provisional Order of the Minister of Health relating to the borough of Torquay.
	Torquay Order 1938	
Ministry of Health Provisional Order Confirmation (Calne Water) Act 1938	1 & 2 Geo. 6. c. l	13 July 1938
An Act to confirm a Provisional Order of the Minister of Health relating to the aine Waterworks Company Limited.
	Calne Water Order 1938	
Sheffield and District Gas Act 1938	1 & 2 Geo. 6. c. li	13 July 1938
An Act to change the name of the Sheffield Gas Company; and for other purposes.
Blackburn Corporation Act 1938	1 & 2 Geo. 6. c. lii	13 July 1938
An Act to confer further powers upon the Mayor Aldermen and Burgesses of the Borough of Blackburn with respect to their water and electricity undertakings; to make better provision for the health and local government of the borough; and for other purposes.
London and North Eastern Railway Act 1938	1 & 2 Geo. 6. c. liii	13 July 1938
An Act to empower the London and North Eastern Railway Company to widen certain of their railways; to construct other works in connection with their undertaking and to acquire lands; to confer further powers on the Company, and for other purposes.
Redcar Corporation Act 1938	1 & 2 Geo. 6. c. liv	13 July 1938
An Act to confer further powers on the Mayor Aldermen and Burgesses of the Borough of Redcar in regard to their electricity gas and water undertakings and to make further and better provision for the improvement health local government and finance of the borough, and for other purposes.
Southern Railway Act 1938	1 & 2 Geo. 6. c. lv	13 July 1938
An Act to empower the Southern Railway Company to construct works and to acquire lands to extend the time for the compulsory purchase of certain lands to make provision with reference to the rates rents tolls and charges which may be levied at the Southampton Docks of the Company to confer further powers upon the Company and for other purposes.
Swinton and Pendlebury Corporation Act 1938	1 & 2 Geo. 6. c. lvi	13 July 1938
An Act to confer further powers on the Mayor Aldermen and Burgesses of the borough of Swinton and Pendlebury in regard to their electricity undertaking lands and other matters; to make further and better provision for the improvement health and local government of the borough; to transfer to the Corporation the powers of a Burial Board, and for other purposes.
Harwich Harbour Act 1938 (repealed)	1 & 2 Geo. 6. c. lvii	13 July 1938
An Act to confer further powers upon the Harwich Harbour Conservancy Board. (Repealed by Harwich Harbour Act 1974 (c. i))
Shropshire, Worcestershire and Staffordshire Electric Power (Consolidation) Act 1938	1 & 2 Geo. 6. c. lviii	13 July 1938
An Act to consolidate the Shropshire Worcestershire and Staffordshire Electric Power Acts and Orders 1903 to 1933.
West Thurrock Estate Act 1938	1 & 2 Geo. 6. c. lix	13 July 1938
An Act for the regulation of certain roads on the West Thurrock Estate in the county of Essex; and for other purposes.
Surrey County Council Act 1938 (repealed)	1 & 2 Geo. 6. c. lx	13 July 1938
An Act to empower the Surrey County Council to purchase lands compulsorily to confirm an agreement between the said County Council and the Carshalton Urban District Council to empower the said urban district council to use lands for cemetery purposes to empower the said County Council to borrow money and for other purposes. (Repealed by Surrey Act 1985 (c. iii))
Cowes Urban District Council Act 1938 (repealed)	1 & 2 Geo. 6. c. lxi	13 July 1938
An Act to confer further powers on the Cowes Urban District Council in regard to their water and gas undertakings; to make further and better provision for the health local government finance and improvement of the Urban District, and for other purposes. (Repealed by Isle of Wight Act 1980 (c. xv))
Derwent Valley Water Act 1938	1 & 2 Geo. 6. c. lxii	13 July 1938
An Act to confer further powers upon the Derwent Valley Water Board, and for other purposes.
Clacton Urban District Council Act 1938	1 & 2 Geo. 6. c. lxiii	13 July 1938
An Act to empower the Urban District Council of Clacton to construct a sea wall and other sea defence work; to provide for the levying of rates in respect of sea defence works; to make further and better provision for the improvement health and local government of the district of the Council; to confer further powers on the Council in regard to their water gas and electricity undertakings lands and other matters, and for other purposes.
Lochaber Water Power Order Confirmation Act 1938	1 & 2 Geo. 6. c. lxiv	29 July 1938
An Act to confirm a Provisional Order under the Private Legislation Procedure (Scotland) Act 1936 relating to the Lochaber Power Company.
	Lochaber Water Power Order 1938	
Island of Arran Piers Order Confirmation Act 1938	1 & 2 Geo. 6. c. lxv	29 July 1938
An Act to confirm a Provisional Order under the Private Legislation Procedure (Scotland) Act 1936 relating to the Island of Arran Piers.
	Island of Arran Piers Order 1938	
West Hartlepool Corporation (Trolley Vehicles) Order Confirmation Act 1938 (repealed)	1 & 2 Geo. 6. c. lxvi	29 July 1938
An Act to confirm a Provisional Order made by the Minister of Transport under the West Hartlepool Corporation Act, 1923, (Note: West Hartlepool Corporation Act 1923 (13 & 14 Geo. 5. c. xcv)) relating to West Hartlepool Corporation Trolley Vehicles. (Repealed by County of Cleveland Act 1987 (c. ix))
	West Hartlepool Corporation (Trolley Vehicles) Order 1938	
Ipswich Corporation (Trolley Vehicles) Order Confirmation Act 1938	1 & 2 Geo. 6. c. lxvii	29 July 1938
An Act to confirm a Provisional Order made by the Minister of Transport, under the Ipswich Corporation Act, 1925, (Note: Ipswich Corporation Act 1925 (15 & 16 Geo. 5. c. ciii)) relating to Ipswich Corporation Trolley Vehicles.
	Ipswich Corporation (Trolley Vehicles) Order 1938	
Newcastle-upon-Tyne Corporation (Trolley Vehicles) Order Confirmation Act 1938	1 & 2 Geo. 6. c. lxviii	29 July 1938
An Act to confirm a Provisional Order made by the Minister of Transport, under the Newcastle-upon-Tyne Corporation (General Powers) Act, 1935, (Note: Newcastle-upon-Tyne Corporation (General Powers) Act 1935 (25 & 26 Geo. 5. c. cxxiv)) relating to Newcastle-upon-Tyne Corporation Trolley Vehicles.
	Newcastle-upon-Tyne Corporation (Trolley Vehicles) Order 1938	
West Midlands Joint Electricity Authority Order Confirmation Act 1938	1 & 2 Geo. 6. c. lxix	29 July 1938
An Act to confirm a Provisional Order made under section one of the Electricity (Supply) Act, 1922, relating to West Midlands Joint Electricity Authority
	West Midlands Joint Electricity Authority (Increase of Borrowing Powers) Order 1938	
Pier and Harbour Order (Plymouth) Confirmation Act 1938 (repealed)	1 & 2 Geo. 6. c. lxx	29 July 1938
An Act to confirm a Provisional Order made by the Minister of Transport under the General Pier and Harbour Act, 1861, (Note: General Pier and Harbour Act 1861 (24 & 25 Vict. c. 45)) relating to Plymouth. (Repealed by Plymouth City Council Act 1987 (c. iv))
Land Drainage Provisional Order (Louth Drainage District) Confirmation Act 1938	1 & 2 Geo. 6. c. lxxi	29 July 1938
An Act to confirm a Provisional Order made by the Minister of Agriculture and Fisheries under Part III of the Land Drainage Act, 1930, (Note: Land Drainage Act 1930 (20 & 21 Geo. 5. c. 44)) relating to Louth Drainage District.
	Louth Drainage District Order 1938	
Ministry of Health Provisional Order Confirmation (Cirencester) Act 1938	1 & 2 Geo. 6. c. lxxii	29 July 1938
An Act to confirm a Provisional Order of the Minister of Health relating to the urban district of Cirencester.
	Cirencester Water Order 1938	
Ministry of Health Provisional Confirmation Order (Wath-upon-Dearne) Act 1938 (repealed)	1 & 2 Geo. 6. c. lxxiii	29 July 1938
An Act to confirm a Provisional Order of the Minister of Health relating to the urban district of Wath-upon-Dearne. (Repealed by Statute Law (Repeals) Act 1989 (c. 43))
	Wath-upon-Dearne Order 1938	
Ministry of Health Provisional Order Confirmation (Church Stretton) Act 1938	1 & 2 Geo. 6. c. lxxiv	29 July 1938
An Act to confirm a Provisional Order of the Minister of Health relating to the urban district of Church Stretton.
	Church Stretton Order 1938	
Ministry of Health Provisional Order Confirmation (Horsforth) Act 1938 (repealed)	1 & 2 Geo. 6. c. lxxv	29 July 1938
An Act to confirm a Provisional Order of the Minister of Health relating to the urban district of Horsforth. (Repealed by West Yorkshire Act 1980 (c. xiv))
	Horsforth Order 1938 Provisional order altering a local Act. (Note: Horsforth Urban District Council Waterworks Act 1899 (62 & 63 Vict. c. xix))	
Ministry of Health Provisional Order Confirmation (Llandrindod Wells) Act 1938 (repealed)	1 & 2 Geo. 6. c. lxxvi	29 July 1938
An Act to confirm a Provisional Order of the Minister of Health relating to the urban district of Llandrindod Wells. (Repealed by Radnorshire and North Breconshire Water Board Order 1965 (SI 1965/1290))
	Llandrindod Wells Order 1938 Provisional order amending certain local acts.	
Ministry of Health Provisional Order Confirmation (Rawmarsh) Act 1938 (repealed)	1 & 2 Geo. 6. c. lxxvii	29 July 1938
An Act to confirm a Provisional Order of the Minister of Health relating to the urban district of Rawmarsh. (Repealed by Statute Law (Repeals) Act 1989 (c. 43))
	Rawmarsh Order 1938	
Ministry of Health Provisional Order Confirmation (Bucks Water Board) Act 1938	1 & 2 Geo. 6. c. lxxviii	29 July 1938
An Act to confirm a Provisional Order of the Minister of Health relating to the district of the Bucks Water Board.
	Bucks Water Order 1938	
Bristol Corporation Act 1938	1 & 2 Geo. 6. c. lxxix	29 July 1938
An Act to authorise the Lord Mayor Aldermen and Burgesses of the City of Bristol to execute works and to acquire lands; to alter the limits of the Port and Harbour of Bristol and to constitute the Corporation a local lighthouse authority; to confer further powers upon the Corporation and to make further and better provision for the health local government improvement and finance of the City; to authorise the use of certain lands in the City as burial grounds; and for other purposes.
Chichester Corporation Act 1938	1 & 2 Geo. 6. c. lxxx	29 July 1938
An Act to enlarge the powers of the Mayor Aldermen and Citizens of the City of Chichester in regard to Chichester Harbour; to confer further powers upon the said Mayor Aldermen and Citizens with reference to their electricity and water undertakings; to make further and better provision for the health local government finance and improvement of the City; and for other purposes.
London County Council (Tunnel and Improvements) Act 1938	1 & 2 Geo. 6. c. lxxxi	29 July 1938
An Act to empower the London County Council to make a new street street widenings and other works in connection with the southern approach to Wandsworth Bridge; and to construct a tunnel under the River Thames and street and other works in connection with Blackwall Tunnel; to empower the Council of the Metropolitan Borough and City of Westminster to make street improvements, and for other purposes.
Newcastle and Gateshead Waterworks Act 1938	1 & 2 Geo. 6. c. lxxxii	29 July 1938
An Act to authorise the Newcastle and Gateshead Water Company to construct additional works; to confer upon the Company further capital and borrowing powers, and for other purposes.
Gateshead and District Tramways and Trolley Vehicles Act 1938	1 & 2 Geo. 6. c. lxxxiii	29 July 1938
An Act to authorise the Gateshead and District Tramways Company to run trolley vehicles and to abandon their tramways; and for other purposes.
Wear Navigation and Sunderland Dock Act 1938	1 & 2 Geo. 6. c. lxxxiv	29 July 1938
An Act to authorise the River Wear Commissioners to execute works; to alter the constitution of those Commissioners; and for other purposes.
Stanmore Unused Burial Ground Act 1938	1 & 2 Geo. 6. c. lxxxv	29 July 1938
An Act to provide for the removal of the restrictions attaching to certain land which is consecrated as a burial ground in the urban district of Harrow; to authorise the sale of such land and its use for building or otherwise, and for other purposes
Guildford Corporation Act 1938	1 & 2 Geo. 6. c. lxxxvi	29 July 1938
An Act to authorise the Mayor Aldermen and Burgesses of the Borough of Guildford to execute street works and to acquire lands for those and other purposes; to empower the Corporation to purchase by agreement the Godalming Navigation and to confer further powers upon them in regard to their water electricity and markets undertakings and the health local government and improvement of the borough, and for other purposes.
Canterbury Gas and Water Act 1938	1 & 2 Geo. 6. c. lxxxvii	29 July 1938
An Act to provide for the conversion and amalgamation of the existing capital of the Canterbury Gas and Water Company; to authorise the Company to raise additional money; to confer further powers upon the Company, and for other purposes.
Workington Corporation Act 1938	1 & 2 Geo. 6. c. lxxxviii	29 July 1938
An Act to authorise the Mayor Aldermen and Burgesses of the borough of Workington to construct additional waterworks; to take water from the river Derwent; to construct an outfall pipe, and for other purposes.
Brighton Corporation (Transport) Act 1938	1 & 2 Geo. 6. c. lxxxix	29 July 1938
An Act to confirm an agreement between the Brighton Corporation and the Brighton Hove and District Omnibus Company Limited for the provision and working in co-ordination of passenger road transport by the said Corporation and the said Company and the sharing of the revenues thereof and other matters; to confer powers upon the said Corporation and Company in connection with the running of trolley vehicles; to enact provisions with respect to the abandonment by the said Corporation of their tramways and with respect to the railway known as "Volk's Electric Railway"; to empower the said Corporation to borrow money, and for other purposes.
Middlesex County Council (Sewerage) Act 1938 (repealed)	1 & 2 Geo. 6. c. xc	29 July 1938
An Act to make further provision with regard to the health improvement and local government of the county of Middlesex to confer further powers on the Council of that county and the local authorities therein to make further provision with reference to the Middlesex quarter sessions the superannuation of the officers and servants and the administration of the enactments relating to mental treatment and for other purposes. (Repealed by Middlesex County Council Act 1944 (7 & 8 Geo. 6. c. xxi))
Lee Conservancy Catchment Board Act 1938	1 & 2 Geo. 6. c. xci	29 July 1938
An Act to authorise the Lee Conservancy Catchment Board to execute works and exercise powers with respect to the drainage of their catchment area and for the prevention of floods therein, and for other purposes.
London Passenger Transport Act 1938	1 & 2 Geo. 6. c. xcii	29 July 1938
An Act to empower the London Passenger Transport Board to provide certain services of trolley vehicles; to construct new works; to acquire lands; to extend the time for the compulsory purchase of certain lands and the completion of certain works; to confer further powers on the Board, and for other purposes.
Green Belt (London and Home Counties) Act 1938 or the Green Belt Act 1938	1 & 2 Geo. 6. c. xciii	29 July 1938
An Act to make provision for the preservation from industrial or building development of areas of land in and around the administrative county of London to confer powers for that purpose upon the London County Council and certain other authorities and persons and for other purposes.
Lancashire County Council (Rivers Board and General Powers) Act 1938 (repealed)	1 & 2 Geo. 6. c. xciv	29 July 1938
An Act to constitute and incorporate a Joint Board consisting of representatives of the County Councils of the administrative countiesof the Counties Palatine of Lancaster and Chester and the administrative county of Derby and of the Councils of the County Boroughs of Blackburn Blackpool Bolton Burnley Bury Manchester Oldham Preston Rochdale St. Helens Salford Southport Stockport Warrington and Wigan; to confer powers on the Board with respect to the prevention of the pollution and the obstruction of certain rivers streams and watercourses; to confer further powers on the County Council of the administrative county of the County Palatine of Lancaster and on the local authorities in that county in relation to health local government and finance; to enact provisions with respect to roads shell-fish education and places of public entertainment; to amend the Shops (Hours of Closing) Act 1928; (Note: Shops (Hours of Closing) Act 1928 (18 & 19 Geo. 5. c. 33)) and for other purposes. (Repealed by County of Lancashire Act 1984 (c. xxi))
Nottingham Corporation Act 1938	1 & 2 Geo. 6. c. xcv	29 July 1938
An Act to authorise the Lord Mayor Aldermen and Citizens of the city of Nottingham and county of the same city to construct street works and waterworks and to purchase lands compulsorily for those and other purposes; to extend the Corporation's limits for the supply of water; and to confer further powers upon the Corporation with regard to streets buildings sewers and drains and the health and good government of the city; and for other purposes.
Stockton-on-Tees Corporation Act 1938 (repealed)	1 & 2 Geo. 6. c. xcvi	29 July 1938
An Act to empower the Mayor Aldermen and Burgesses of the borough of Stockton-on-Tees to acquire and develop lands and to construct railways; and to confer upon the Corporation further powers with regard to their electricity undertaking and the health good government and improvement of the borough; and for other purposes. (Repealed by County of Cleveland Act 1987 (c. ix))
Salford Corporation Act 1938	1 & 2 Geo. 6. c. xcvii	29 July 1938
An Act to authorise the Mayor Aldermen and Citizens of the City of Salford to cover over part of the River Irwell and acquire lands for that purpose and for the purposes of their transport undertaking; to provide for the licensing of employment agencies; to confer further powers upon the Corporation and to make further and better provision for the health local government improvement and finance of the City; and for other purposes.
Warrington Corporation Water Act 1938	1 & 2 Geo. 6. c. xcviii	29 July 1938
An Act to empower the Mayor Aldermen and Wards Bill Burgesses of the borough of Warrington to construct waterworks; to make further provision with regard to their water undertaking; and for other purposes.
Middlesex County Council (General Powers) Act 1938 (repealed)	1 & 2 Geo. 6. c. xcix	29 July 1938
An Act to make further provision with regard to the health improvement and local government of the county of Middlesex, to confer further powers on the Council of that county and the local authorities therein; to make further provision with reference to the Middlesex Quarter Sessions, the superannuation of the officers and servants and the administration of the enactments relating to mental treatment and for other purposes. (Repealed by Middlesex County Council Act 1944 (7 & 8 Geo. 6. c. xxi))
West Yorkshire Gas Distribution Act 1938	1 & 2 Geo. 6. c. c	29 July 1938
An Act for incorporating and conferring powers upon the West Yorkshire Gas Distribution Company, and for other purposes.
Penzance Corporation Act 1938	1 & 2 Geo. 6. c. ci	29 July 1938
An Act to empower the Mayor Aldermen and Burgesses of the Borough of Penzance to construct waterworks; to make further provision with regard to their water undertaking; and for other purposes.

=== Private acts ===
Short title	Citation	Royal assent
Long title
Tatton Estate Act 1938	1 & 2 Geo. 6. c. 1 Pr.	29 July 1938
An Act to vary the limitations and trusts of the Will dated the 28th day of February 1923 and the First Codicil thereto dated the 15th day of January 1924 both proved in the Manchester District Probate Registry on the 11th day of January 1927 of Reginald Arthur Tatton late of Cuerden Hall in the County of Lancaster.

== 2 & 3 Geo. 6 ==
The fourth session of the 37th Parliament of the United Kingdom, which met from 8 November 1938 until 23 November 1939.

This session was also traditionally cited as 2 & 3 G. 6.

=== Public general acts ===
Short title	Citation	Royal assent
Long title
Expiring Laws Continuance Act 1938 (repealed)	2 & 3 Geo. 6. c. 1	22 December 1938
An Act to continue certain expiring laws. (Repealed by Statute Law Revision Act 1950 (14 Geo. 6. c. 6))
Public Works Loans Act 1938 (repealed)	2 & 3 Geo. 6. c. 2	22 December 1938
An Act to grant money for the purpose of certain local loans out of the Local Loans Fund, and for other purposes relating to local loans. (Repealed by Statute Law Revision Act 1950 (14 Geo. 6. c. 6))
Housing (Financial Provisions) (Scotland) Act 1938 (repealed)	2 & 3 Geo. 6. c. 3	22 December 1938
An Act to amend the law in Scotland with respect to the making of contributions out of the Exchequer and by local authorities in respect of housing accommodation provided for the working classes, and with respect to arrangements between local authorities and other persons for the provision of such housing accommodation; and for purposes connected with the matters aforesaid. (Repealed by Housing (Financial Provisions) (Scotland) Act 1972 (c. 46))

=== Local acts ===
Short title	Citation	Royal assent
Long title
Glasgow Corporation Order Confirmation Act 1938	2 & 3 Geo. 6. c. i	22 December 1938
An Act to confirm a Provisional Order under the Private Legislation Procedure (Scotland) Act 1936 (Note: Private Legislation Procedure (Scotland) Act 1936 (26 Geo. 5 & 1 Edw. 8. c. 52)) relating to Glasgow Corporation.
	Glasgow Corporation Order 1938 Provisional Order to authorise the Corporation of the city of Glasgow to borrow further moneys for the purposes of their tramway undertaking to confer further powers on the Corporation and for other purposes.	
Paisley Corporation (Cart Navigation) Order Confirmation Act 1938	2 & 3 Geo. 6. c. ii	22 December 1938
An Act to confirm a Provisional Order under the Private Legislation Procedure (Scotland) Act 1936 relating to Paisley Corporation (Cart Navigation).
	Paisley Corporation (Cart Navigation) Order 1938 Provisional Order to transfer to and vest in the provost magistrates and councillors of the burgh of Paisley the undertaking of the Cart Navigation Trustees and to confer upon the said provost magistrates and councillors all necessary powers for carrying on the said undertaking and for other purposes.	
Aberdeen Corporation (General Powers) Order Confirmation Act 1938	2 & 3 Geo. 6. c. iii	22 December 1938
An Act to confirm a Provisional Order under the Private Legislation Procedure (Scotland) Act 1936 relating to Aberdeen Corporation (General Powers).
	Aberdeen Corporation (General Powers) Order 1938 Provisional Order to consolidate with amendments the Acts and Orders of or relating to the corporation of the city and royal burgh of Aberdeen in respect of public health and general municipal administration of the city and to confer further powers upon the Corporation with respect thereto to make further provision for the local government health and improvement of the city and for other purposes.	
National Trust for Scotland Order Confirmation Act 1938	2 & 3 Geo. 6. c. iv	22 December 1938
An Act to confirm a Provisional Order under the Private Legislation Procedure (Scotland) Act 1936 relating to the National Trust for Scotland.
	National Trust for Scotland Order 1938 Provisional Order to confer further powers upon the National Trust for Scotland for Places of Historic Interest or Natural Beauty and for other purposes.	
Ministry of Health Provisional Order Confirmation (Mid Staffordshire Joint Hospital District) Act 1938	2 & 3 Geo. 6. c. v	22 December 1938
An Act to confirm a Provisional Order of the Minister of Health relating to the Mid-Staffordshire Joint Hospital District.
	Mid-Staffordshire Joint Hospital Order 1938 Provisional order forming a united district under section 6 of the Public Health Act 1936. (Note: Public Health Act 1936 (26 Geo. 5 & 1 Edw. 8. c. 49))	

== See also ==
- List of acts of the Parliament of the United Kingdom
