= Coal commission =

Coal commission or Coal Commission may refer to:

- Coal Commission (United Kingdom), a UK government agency to manage coal reserves between 1938 and 1947
- Coal commission (Germany) (Commission on Growth, Structural Change and Employment), a German government commission between 2018 and 2019

== See also ==
- Federal Coal Commission
