= British Coal =

British state-owned coal producer, 1987–2004

British Coal Corporation
- Predecessor: National Coal Board
- Successor: Coal Authority
- Formation: 5 March 1987; 39 years ago
- Dissolved: 27 March 2004; 22 years ago
- Legal status: Statutory corporation
- Headquarters: Hobart House, Grosvenor Place, London SW1X 7AE
- Products: Coal
- Owner: UK Government
- Chairman: Sir Robert Haslam (1987–1990); Neil Clarke (1991–June 1997); Philip Hutchinson (June 1997–December 1997); Mike Atkinson (1998–2000); Peter Mason (2000–2004)

The British Coal Corporation was a nationalised corporation responsible for the mining of coal in the United Kingdom from 1987 until it was effectively dissolved in 1997. The corporation was created by renaming its predecessor, the National Coal Board (NCB).

== History ==
Coal Industry Act 1987 (Note: Section 10(1).)
- Act of Parliament
- Parliament of the United Kingdom
- Long title: An Act to change the name of the National Coal Board to the British Coal Corporation; to make new provision with respect to grants by the Secretary of State to the Corporation; to make provision for securing further participation by organisations representing employees in the coal industry in the management of trusts and other bodies connected with that industry and in the management of superannuation schemes for such employees; and for other purposes connected therewith.
- Citation: 1987 c. 3
- Territorial extent: England and Wales; Scotland; (Note: Section 10(4).)

Dates
- Royal assent: 5 March 1987
- Commencement: 5 March 1987 (exception sections 6–8); 5 May 1987 (sections 6–8); (Note: Section 10(2).)

Other legislation
- Amends: List: Coal Industry Nationalisation Act 1946; Coal Industry Act 1949; Miners' Welfare Act 1952; Landlord and Tenant Act 1954; Coal-Mining (Subsidence) Act 1957; Public Records Act 1958; Opencast Coal Act 1958; Coal Industry Act 1962; Licensing Act 1964; Continental Shelf Act 1964; Coal Industry Act 1965; Coal Industry Act 1965 Mines (Working Facilities and Support) Act 1966 Building Control Act 1966 Industrial Development Act 1966 National Coal Board (Additional Powers) Act 1966 Coal Industry Act 1967; Gaming Act 1968; Coal Industry Act 1971; Town and Country Planning Act 1971; Town and Country Planning (Scotland) Act 1972; Coal Industry Act 1973; Local Government Act 1974; Control of Pollution Act 1974; House of Commons Disqualification Act 1975; Northern Ireland Assembly Disqualification Act 1975; Local Government (Scotland) Act 1975; Statutory Corporations (Financial Provisions) Act 1975; Coal Industry Act 1975; Welsh Development Agency Act 1975; National Coal Board (Finance) Act 1976; Local Government (Miscellaneous Provisions) Act 1976; Land Drainage Act 1976; Development of Rural Wales Act 1976; Coal Industry Act 1977; Ancient Monuments and Archaeological Areas Act 1979; Coal Industry Act 1980; Overseas Development and Co-operation Act 1980; Local Government, Planning and Land Act 1980; Highways Act 1980; Acquisition of Land Act 1981; Coal Industry Act 1982; Iron and Steel Act 1982; Civic Government (Scotland) Act 1982; National Audit Act 1983; Housing Defects Act 1984; Roads (Scotland) Act 1984; Coal Industry Act 1985; Housing Act 1985; Weights and Measures Act 1985; Agricultural Holdings Act 1986
- Amended by: Coal Industry Act 1990; Planning (Consequential Provisions) Act 1990; Coal Mining Subsidence Act 1991; Water Consolidation (Consequential Provisions) Act 1991; Coal Industry Act 1992; Statute Law (Repeals) Act 1993; Coal Industry Act 1994; Planning (Consequential Provisions) (Scotland) Act 1997; International Development Act 2002; Statute Law (Repeals) Act 2004; Charities Act 2006; Charities Act 2011; Charities Act 2022

Status: Partially repealed

Text of statute as originally enacted

Revised text of statute as amended

Text of the Coal Industry Act 1987 as in force today (including any amendments) within the United Kingdom, from legislation.gov.uk.

The Coal Industry Act 1987 (c. 3) changed the name of the National Coal Board (NCB) to the British Coal Corporation. With the passing of the Coal Industry Act 1994, the 16th and last Coal Industry Act, the industry-wide administrative functions of British Coal were transferred to the new Coal Authority from 31 October 1994.

All economic assets were privatised. The English mining operations were merged with RJB Mining to form UK Coal, a monopoly. British Coal continued as a separate organisation until 31 December 1997, after which it was run as a residual legal entity by staff within the Coal Directorate of the Department of Trade and Industry, eventually being dissolved on 27 March 2004.

== List of collieries ==
British Coal Corporation collieries operating in 1994
Colliery	Location
Longannet	Fife
Point of Ayr	Flintshire
Kellingley	Yorkshire
Maltby	Yorkshire
Prince of Wales	Yorkshire
North Selby	Yorkshire
Riccall	Yorkshire
Stillingfleet	Yorkshire
Wistow	Yorkshire
Whitemoor	Yorkshire
Bilsthorpe	Nottinghamshire
Harworth	Nottinghamshire
Thoresby	Nottinghamshire
Welbeck	Nottinghamshire
Daw Mill	Warwickshire
Asfordby	Leicestershire

== See also ==
- Coal mining in the United Kingdom
- History of coal mining in the United Kingdom
- National Coal Board
- Open-pit coal mining in the United Kingdom
