= Open-pit coal mining in the United Kingdom =

Fossil fuel from near surface deposits

Open-pit coal mining in the United Kingdom was an industry launched in Britain during and after the Second World War. For practical purposes, it had ended by 2023.

An open-pit coal mine typically lasted for four or five years, at extraction rates of up to a quarter of a million tons a year. Until 2014, statistics on open-pit coal mining were compiled by the British Geological Survey from information provided by local planning authorities.

== 20th century ==
Opencast coalmining in Britain began in 1942, producing some 1,100,000 tons of coal in that year. By 1947 it was producing about ten million tons a year. In October 1947, it was announced that opencast coal would be producing 50 million tons a year by the end of 1951 and that 50,000 acres, in addition to the 35,000 acres already requisitioned, would have been taken over by 1951.

There was some limited coal mining in Northern Ireland, but it had come to an end by 1970, when the Coalisland mine closed.

== 2010 to 2016 ==
In 2010, the United Kingdom was forecast to produce about ten million tonnes (9,800,000 long tons; 11,000,000 short tons) of coal a year from open-pit mines. Almost half then came from Scotland, with the largest operator there being the Scottish Coal subsidiary Scottish Resources Group. Actual production in 2010 was over 13 million tonnes, but this had declined to less than 8 million tonnes in 2014.

In 2016, it was reported that the output of open-pit coal mines in Britain had fallen every year since 2010.

In November 2015, Amber Rudd made a British Government announcement that all the remaining coal-fired power stations must close by 2025. In February 2020, the government said it would consult on bringing this closure date forward to 2024.

=== Production ===
Production figures in tonnes, 2010 to 2014. Source
Year	England	Wales	Scotland	GB total
2014	2,884,935	2,488,321	2,497,014	7,870,270
2013	3,411,955	2,342,812	2,829,155	8,583,922
2012	2,956,331	2,408,313	4,823,357	10,188,001
2011	2,948,997	2,102,995	5,527,765	10,579,757
2010	2,599,941	4,423,295	6,038,479	13,061,715

==== Scotland ====
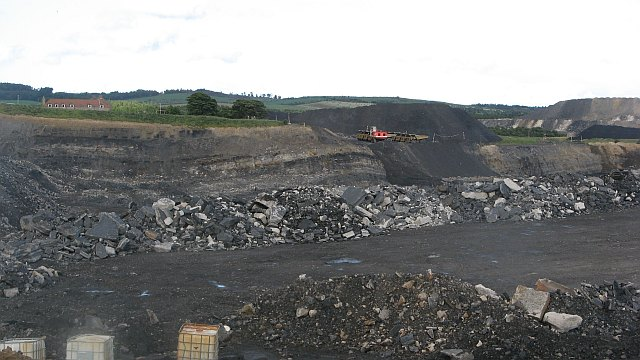
Muir Dean coal mine

Hargreaves plc announced in 2016 the closure of the following operations:

- Broken Cross in South Lanarkshire
- Duncanziemere and Netherton in Ayrshire
- St. Ninians and Muir Dean in Fife
- Glenmuckloch in Dumfriesshire

==== Wales ====
Tower Colliery site in Hirwaun

The deep mine at Tower Colliery closed in 2008, but there was a plan to build an 80-hectare 165-metre open-pit mine to extract a remaining six-million-ton reserve of anthracite, for which a planning application was registered in July 2010. The opencast operation stopped production in March 2017, after it was unable to sell the coal to Aberthaw Power Station due to stricter environmental controls.

Nant-y-Mynydd

Energybuild Ltd operated an opencast mine here; in 2006 it was estimated to have 450,000 tons of recoverable coal, most of which was excavated between 2006 and 2009. The overburden was sold as road stone.

Selar

Celtic Energy operated a mine at Selar in the Neath Valley. Extraction was approved in 1995, but the start of mining operations was delayed until 1997. In 2013, planning permission was granted to extend the extraction by 800,000 tonnes, which was expected to keep the mine operational until 2020. However, the mine was mothballed in 2015, due to low coal prices. After that, Celtic Energy operated only the expanded East Pit.

Nant Llesg

Miller Argent planned to extract six million tonnes of coal at Nant Llesg, near Rhymney. Its application was refused by Caerphilly county borough council on 7 August 2015. The company considered an appeal.

==== England ====
Banks Mining applied in October 2015 for planning permission to extract about three million tonnes of coal and other minerals from the Highthorn mine in Northumberland. The application was refused in March 2018.

=== UK Coal (company, England and Scotland) ===
Active sites in 2010

- Long Moor: 725,000 tonnes initial reserves
- Lodge House (Derbyshire): one million tonnes of initial reserves; a further 800,000 tonnes awaiting planning approval in August 2011
- Cutacre (Greater Manchester, between Bolton and Salford): 900,000 tonnes initial reserves
- Steadsburn (fifteen miles north of Newcastle upon Tyne): one million tonnes of initial reserves plus 300,000 tonnes of fireclay
- Stobswood, at Stobswood near Morpeth in Northumberland.

UK Coal prospective mines in 2010

In 2010, UK Coal had the following prospective mines in England and Scotland:

- Hoodsclose, County Durham (2,200,000 tonnes of coal + 500,000 tonnes of fireclay)
- Potland Burn, Northumberland (2,000,000 tonnes)
- Park Wall North, Co. Durham (1,275,000 tonnes)
- Bradley, Co. Durham (550,000 tonnes) - permission refused in February 2011 although UK Coal said it would appeal.
- Huntington Lane, Shropshire (900,000 tonnes)
- Blair House, Fife (700,000 tonnes)
- Former Minorca Colliery (Measham, Leicestershire); 1,250,000 tonnes and 250,000 tonnes of fireclay - planning permission granted July 2011, production expected to commence summer 2012.
- Butterwell Disposal Point (Northumberland); one million tonnes and 200,000 tonnes of fireclay

During this period, open-pit coal mining was actively opposed by the Loose Anti-Opencast Network (LAON) by Greenpeace, and by Friends of the Earth.

== Mines still active after 2016 ==
In September 2017, there were nine opencast mines operating in the United Kingdom, with a total manpower of 590. Production had declined to around three million tonnes a year by 2017.

As of October 2021, the Ffos-y-fran Land Reclamation Scheme was the only major open-pit coal mine operating in Britain, with a few other small mines (with an employee count of much less than fifty per mine) still in operation. Also, as of October, 2021 there were no major applications pending to open new mines. The opencast mine at Ffos-y-fran ceased operation in November 2023, which ended significant opencast coal-mining in Britain.

As of September 2024, there were still two open-pit coal mines in the United Kingdom with extant mining licences, one in Derbyshire in England and another in Merthyr Tydfil in Wales. However, Mining Remediation Authority data indicated that neither mine was active, with both reporting quarterly output of coal as zero tonnes.

In June 2026, Carmarthenshire County Council refused an application by Bryn Bach Coal Ltd to extract 85,000 tonnes of coal from a 25-acre site at Glan Lash mine near Llandybie, which had closed in 2019, citing adverse impacts on the environment. The mine was planned to create eleven jobs. This was reported as the refusal of the last outstanding coal mine plan.

In 2026, drift mining for anthracite was still ongoing at Aberpergwm, the only producer of high-grade anthracite in Western Europe. Since the closure of the Port Talbot Steelworks blast furnaces in 2024, the mine has had to diversify into producing high-purity coal for making batteries and carbon electrodes.

At a local scale, a small number of Freeminers of the Forest of Dean Coalfield continue to make use of their right to dig for coal there.

=== Wales ===
Miller Argent ran the Ffos-y-fran Land Reclamation Scheme in eastern Merthyr Tydfil, which involved mining the coal from underneath 367 hectares of land made derelict by earlier coal-mining operations; the coal was provided to the Aberthaw Power Station on the Glamorgan coast. The project started in 2007 and finished in 2023. In June 2026, the demolition of Aberthaw was under way.

Celtic Energy only operated the expanded East Pit, until Nant Helen was reopened in 2019 to replace the soon to be closed East Pit. The site's licence was revoked in June 2020; thus mining had to stop.

=== Scotland ===
Hargreaves plc operated one mine in Scotland, House of Water in Ayrshire; the mine stopped operating in 2020.

=== England ===
Banks Mining started coal extraction at its Bradley surface mine in May 2018, amid protesters camping on site. Banks then had three other operational mines, at Shotton and Brenkley Lane, both in Northumberland, and at Rusha in Scotland. All of these mines were closed or under land restoration as of August, 2020, but Banks was awaiting decisions on two proposed mines it wished to open, at Druridge Bay and Newcastle. The application for Druridge Bay was refused on 8 September 2020 for a second time, and the Banks company decided not to appeal, making the decision final. The application for opening a mine at Dewley Hill, Newcastle, was also refused on 18 December 2020.

A coal mine in Hartington, Derbyshire, was still operating in August 2020, but the operator was planning to close it, and it was closed in September 2020.

== Site restoration ==
The Sunday Herald reported on 13 July 2014 that mines in Ayrshire, Lanarkshire, and Fife, abandoned by Scottish Coal when it became insolvent in April 2013, were threatened by rising water levels, contaminated lagoons and erosion.

On 9 July 2015 an Opencast Coal Summit was held in Wales to "explore what the planning system can do to ensure all opencast coal sites are fully and sustainably restored for the benefit of communities and the environment". After the summit, a report was published by Carl Sargeant AM, the Welsh Minister for Natural Resources.

== See also ==
- Coal mining in the United Kingdom
- List of coal mines in the United Kingdom
- Phase-out of coal-fired electricity generation in the United Kingdom
