= Essential Commodities Reserves Act 1938 =

Act of the Parliament of the United Kingdom

Essential Commodities Reserves Act 1938 (Note: Section 7(1).)
- Act of Parliament
- Parliament of the United Kingdom
- Long title: An Act to enable the Board of Trade to obtain information as to commodities which in the opinion of the Board would be essential for the vital needs of the community in the event of war and to make provision for the maintenance of reserves of such commodities; and for purposes connected with the matters aforesaid.
- Citation: 1 & 2 Geo. 6. c. 51
- Territorial extent: United Kingdom (Note: Section 7(2).)

Dates
- Royal assent: 29 July 1938
- Commencement: 29 July 1938 (Note: The Acts of Parliament (Commencement) Act 1793.)
Other legislation
Amended by	Finance Act 1947; Industrial Expansion Act 1968; Criminal Procedure (Scotland) Act 1975; Interpretation Act 1978; Criminal Justice Act 1982; Criminal Justice (Northern Ireland) Order 1984; Criminal Justice Act 2003
Relates to	Emergency Powers (Defence) Act 1939; Ministry of Supply Act 1939

Status: Amended

Text of statute as originally enacted

Revised text of statute as amended

Text of the Essential Commodities Reserves Act 1938 as in force today (including any amendments) within the United Kingdom, from legislation.gov.uk.

The Essential Commodities Reserves Act 1938 (1 & 2 Geo. 6. c. 51) is an act of the Parliament of the United Kingdom. The act was passed in anticipation of the Second World War and allowed the Board of Trade to build up stockpiles of commodities considered to be essential, specifically foodstuffs, animal feed, fertiliser and petroleum products as well as the raw resources needed to manufacture these products. They paid traders at least £13.5 million to stockpile materials in the following year and a half. The act was largely superseded by the Emergency Powers (Defence) Act 1939 (2 & 3 Geo. 6. c. 62) and the establishment, in the same year, of the Ministry of Supply. The stockpiles and associated funding were wound up by 1947 and the act has not been made use of since. It was proposed for repeal by the Law Commission in 2015.

== Provisions ==
In 1938 there were concerns over a possible European war. The Essential Commodities Reserves Act was passed by the first Chamberlain ministry to allow the British government to build up reserves of goods that it considered essential in case of war. It received royal assent on 29 July 1938.

The act empowered the Board of Trade (BoT) to transport and store certain commodities determined as essential. The products were specified by the BoT but limited to categories of products listed by a schedule in the act. This included foodstuffs, animal feed, fertiliser (and the raw materials required to manufacture any of the preceding) and all petroleum products. The BoT was empowered to obtain information from traders as to their current stock level of these materials and their capacity to store them. Traders making late returns could be fined fifty pounds for each day they were late. Those making false returns could be fined £100 and/or imprisoned for three months.

The act authorised the BoT to order traders to increase their stockpiles of any specified material. This was to be funded by payments from the "Essential Commodities Reserves Fund" established with funds authorised by Parliament. The BoT could also draw from the Consolidated Fund, provided it later repaid the funds from the Essential Commodities Reserves Fund.

== Effects ==
The BoT expended around £8.5 million in the storage of commodities in 1938, including a quantity of wheat. It spent at least £5 million in 1939. By the end of 1939 the BoT recorded £6 million worth of goods in its stockpiles including 100,000 long tons (100,000 t) of whale oil and 180 long tons (180 t) of biscuits.

The act was partly superseded by the Emergency Powers (Defence) Act 1939 which granted greater powers in regards to foodstuffs. The BoT's stockpiling role was taken over by the Ministry of Supply established by act of parliament in July 1939 and which held more comprehensive powers. The Second World War erupted in September 1939 and lasted until August 1945. The Essential Commodities Reserves Fund was wound up by 1947, by which time the stocks built up under the act had also been run down and not replaced. The act was not used by the government in the post-war era.

== Amendments and proposed repeal ==
The sections relating to the Essential Commodities Reserves Fund were repealed by the Finance Act 1947 (10 & 11 Geo. 6. c. 35). The fines for non-compliant traders were both amended to those of level 3 on the standard scale by the Criminal Justice Act 1982, without affecting the imprisonment maximum. Provisions allowing the president of the BoT or a secretary of state to authorise others to exert powers under the act were repealed by the Industrial Expansion Act 1968. The definition of foodstuffs was originally given as that under the Food and Drugs (Adulteration) Act 1928 (18 & 19 Geo. 5. c. 31) but was amended to that under the Food and Drugs Act 1955 (4 & 5 Eliz. 2. c. 16) and Food and Drugs (Scotland) Act 1956 by the Interpretation Act 1978.

The act remains in force but was proposed for repeal by the Law Commission in its 20th Statute Law (Repeals) Report of June 2015.
