= Mines (Working Facilities and Support) Act 1966 =

Act of the Parliament of the United Kingdom

Mines (Working Facilities and Support) Act 1966 (Note: Section 16(1).)
- Act of Parliament
- Parliament of the United Kingdom
- Long title: An Act to consolidate Part I of the Mines (Working Facilities and Support) Act 1923 and certain enactments amending the said Part I.
- Citation: 1966 c. 4
- Territorial extent: England and Wales; Scotland; (Note: Section 16(2).)

Dates
- Royal assent: 10 March 1966
- Commencement: 10 April 1966 (Note: Section 16(3).)

Other legislation
- Amends: See § Repealed enactments
- Repeals/revokes: See § Repealed enactments
- Amended by: Minister of Technology Order 1969; Mines (Working Facilities and Support) Act 1974; Town and Country Planning Act 1971; Town and Country Planning (Scotland) Act 1972; Statute Law (Repeals) Act 1974; Town and Country Planning (Minerals) Act 1981; Ancient Monuments and Archaeological Areas Act 1979; Coal Industry Act 1987; Coal Industry Act 1994; Petroleum Act 1998; Constitutional Reform Act 2005; Natural Resources Body for Wales (Functions) Order 2013; Historic Environment (Wales) Act 2023

Status: Amended

Text of statute as originally enacted

Revised text of statute as amended

Text of the Mines (Working Facilities and Support) Act 1966 as in force today (including any amendments) within the United Kingdom, from legislation.gov.uk.

The Mines (Working Facilities and Support) Act 1966 (c. 4) is an act of the Parliament of the United Kingdom that consolidated enactments related to working facilities for mines and restrictions on working minerals required for support in Great Britain.

== Provisions ==
=== Repealed enactments ===
Section 15(1) of the act repealed 9 enactments, listed in schedule 1 to the act.

Enactments repealed by section 15(1)
Citation	Short title	Extent of repeal
13 & 14 Geo. 5. c. 20	Mines (Working Facilities and Support) Act 1923	Part I.
15 & 16 Geo. 5. c. 91	Mines (Working Facilities and Support) Act 1925	The whole act.
16 & 17 Geo. 5. c. 28	Mining Industry Act 1926	Section 13.
16 & 17 Geo. 5. c. 28	Mining Industry Act 1926	Section 24(3)
24 & 25 Geo. 5. c. 27	Mines (Working Facilities) Act 1934	The whole act.
1 & 2 Geo. 6. c. 52	Coal Act 1938	Section 22.
1 & 2 Geo. 6. c. 52	Coal Act 1938	Section 51.
6 & 7 Geo. 6. c. 38	Coal Act 1943	Section 7.
9 & 10 Geo. 6. c. 59	Coal Industry Nationalisation Act 1946	Section 43.
10 & 11 Eliz. 2. c. 58	Pipe-lines Act 1962	Section 57.
1965 c. 2	Administration of Justice Act 1965	In Schedule 1 the amendments of the Mines (Working Facilities and Support) Act 1923, the Mines (Working Facilities and Support) Act 1925 and the Mining Industry Act 1926.

== Subsequent developments ==
Schedule 1 to the act was repealed by section 1 of, and part XI of the schedule to, the Statute Law (Repeals) Act 1974, which came into force on 27 June 1974.
