= Christopher Hurst (cricketer) =

English cricketer

Personal information
- Full name: Christopher Salkeld Hurst
- Born: 20 July 1886; Beckenham, Kent
- Died: 18 December 1963 (aged 77); Dorking, Surrey
- Batting: Right-handed
- Role: Batsman

Domestic team information
- Years: Team
- 1906–1909: Oxford University
- 1908–1927: Kent
- FC debut: 14 May 1906 Oxford Univ v H. D. G. Leveson Gower's XI
- Last FC: 10 June 1927 Kent v Northamptonshire

Career statistics
Competition	First-class
Matches	47
Runs scored	1,787
Batting average	23.51
100s/50s	3/4
Top score	124
Balls bowled	144
Wickets	3
Bowling average	32.00
5 wickets in innings	0
10 wickets in match	0
Best bowling	2/26
Catches/stumpings	41/–
- Source: CricInfo, 31 May 2016

Christopher Salkeld Hurst (20 July 1886 – 18 December 1963) was an English cricketer who played first-class cricket for Oxford University, Kent and various amateur teams between 1906 and 1927. In his working life, he was a civil servant whose main work was concerned with the rationalisation and reorganisation of the UK coal industry to the point where the industry could be nationalised after the Second World War.

== Early life ==
He was born at Beckenham in Kent in 1886. He was educated at Uppingham School where he played cricket for the school XI from 1903 to 1905, captaining the side in his final year. He also played hockey, rugby union and Eton Fives for the school, also captaining the school hockey and Fives teams in 1905. He went on to Exeter College, Oxford in 1905.

== Cricket career ==
Hurst was a right-handed middle-order batsman and an occasional bowler, and although he took some time to establish himself as a cricketer at Oxford University Cricket Club, he played in the University Match against Cambridge University from 1907 to 1909, captaining the Oxford team in his final year. He also played hockey for the University and, from 1908, he played occasional matches for Kent County Cricket Club.

Hurst played in a total of 19 first-class matches for the county team between 1908 and 1927 and was awarded his county cap in 1908. He also appeared in matches for the Gentlemen of England, MCC, Free Foresters and other amateur teams. His main period of significant cricketing success came in 1922, when in five games for Kent, the most he played in any single season, he scored the only three centuries of his career, the highest being an innings of 124 in two hours with 14 fours, made against Lancashire. Hurst led the Kent batting averages in 1922 with an average of 76.07. He played four matches in 1923, two in 1924 and his final two first-class matches in 1927 for the county.

== Professional life ==
Hurst was called to the Bar in 1910 but then entered the UK civil service, serving in the Public Trustee Office from 1911, before transferring to the Ministry of Munitions during the First World War. At the end of the war, he moved to the Ministry of Labour and it was as a labour relations expert that he was drawn into the controversies of the UK coal-mining industry, serving as the secretary of the Royal Commission that attempted to bring warring owners and unions together in the period leading up to the General Strike of 1926, and then to the Coal Mines Reorganization Commission which was charged by the UK government with creating larger units within a highly fragmented industry but proved ineffective. Finally, from 1938, he was secretary to the Coal Commission which, with the imminence and then the reality of the Second World War, had the necessary power to reshape the industry and pave the way for state ownership as the National Coal Board in 1947. Hurst was offered a post within the nationalised industry, but chose instead to retire. He was awarded the Companion of the Order of the Bath and the Officer of the Order of the British Empire honours for his public service.

Hurst died at Dorking in Surrey in 1963 aged 77.
