= Mining Industry Act 1926 =

Act of the Parliament of the United Kingdom

Mining Industry Act 1926 (Note: Section 26(1).)
- Act of Parliament
- Parliament of the United Kingdom
- Long title: An Act to make provision for facilitating the working of minerals and the better organisation of the coal mining industry, and with respect to the welfare of persons employed therein, and for other purposes connected with that industry.
- Citation: 16 & 17 Geo. 5. c. 28
- Territorial extent: England and Wales; Scotland; (Note: Section 26(2).)

Dates
- Royal assent: 4 August 1926
- Commencement: 4 August 1926 (Note: The Acts of Parliament (Commencement) Act 1793.)
Other legislation
Amends	Mining Industry Act 1920; Mines (Working Facilities and Support) Act 1923
Amended by	Petroleum (Production) Act 1934; Coal Act 1938; Coal Industry Act 1949; Railway and Canal Commission (Abolition) Act 1949; Statute Law Revision Act 1950; Miners' Welfare Act 1952; Statute Law Revision Act 1953; Mines and Quarries Act 1954; Science and Technology Act 1965; Administration of Justice Act 1965; Mines (Working Facilities and Support) Act 1966; Mining Industry Act 1926 (Metrication) Regulations 1991; Petroleum Act 1998; Deregulation Act 2015; Higher Education and Research Act 2017
Relates to	Finance (1909-10) Act 1910; Mining Industry (Welfare Fund) Act 1925

Status: Partially repealed

Text of statute as originally enacted

Revised text of statute as amended

Text of the Mining Industry Act 1926 as in force today (including any amendments) within the United Kingdom, from legislation.gov.uk.

The Mining Industry Act 1926 (16 & 17 Geo. 5. c. 28) is an act of the Parliament of the United Kingdom. It made "provision for facilitating the working of minerals and the better organisation of the coal mining industry, and with respect to the welfare of persons employed therein, and for other purposes connected with that industry."

The act continues to be an important piece of historical mining industry regulation in the United Kingdom.

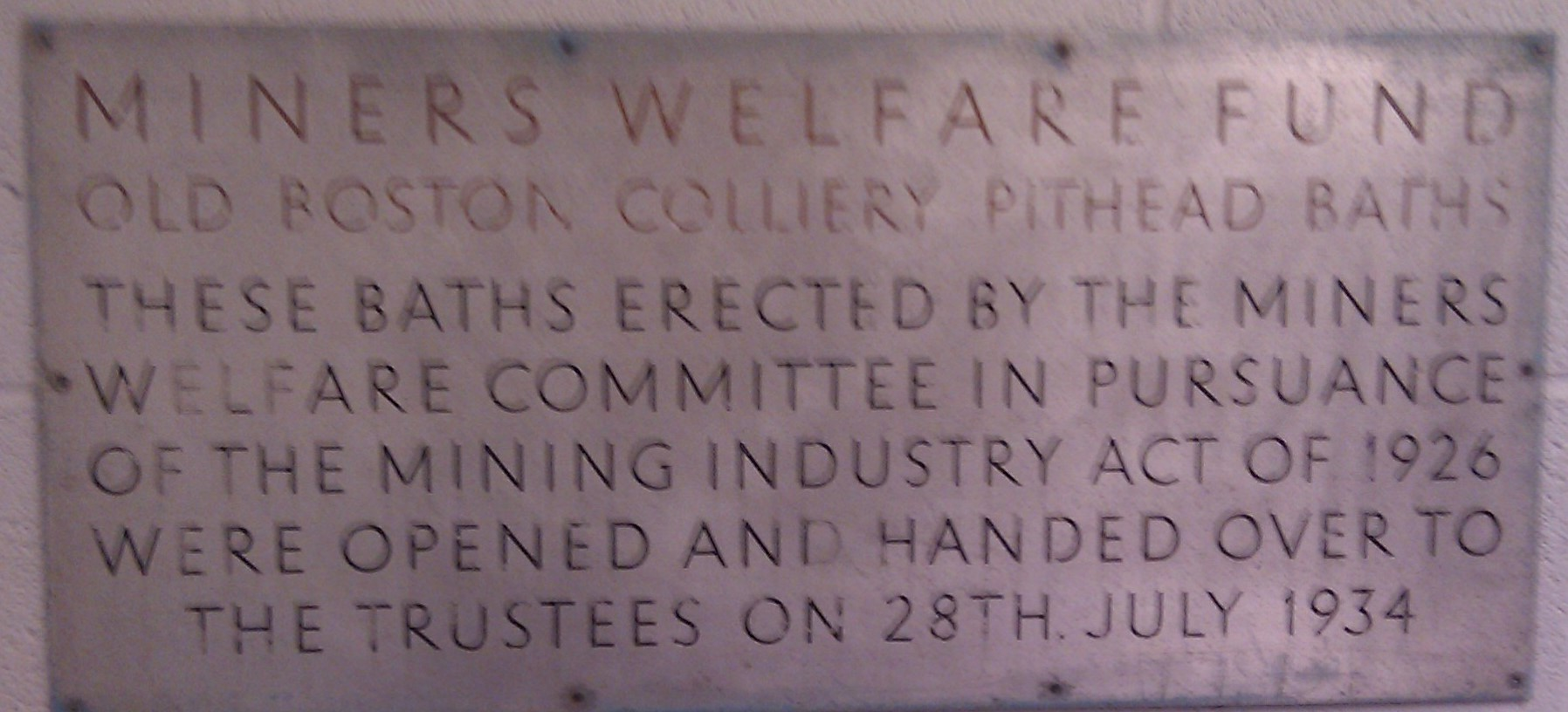
Old Boston Colliery baths

== Subsequent developments ==
Section 15 of the act was repealed by section 1 of, and the first schedule to, the Statute Law Revision Act 1953 (2 & 3 Eliz. 2. c. 5), which came into force on 18 December 1953.
