= Overseas Development and Co-operation Act 1980 =

Act of the Parliament of the United Kingdom

Overseas Development and Co-operation Act 1980 (Note: Section 19(1).)
- Act of Parliament
- Parliament of the United Kingdom
- Long title: An Act to consolidate certain enactments relating to overseas development and co-operation and to repeal, as unnecessary, section 16(1) and (2) of the West Indies Act 1967.
- Citation: 1980 c. 63
- Territorial extent: United Kingdom (Note: Section 19(3).)

Dates
- Royal assent: 13 November 1980
- Commencement: 13 December 1980 (Note: Section 19(2).)
- Repealed: 17 June 2002 (Note: The International Development Act 2002 (Commencement) Order 2002 (SI 2002/1408).)

Other legislation
- Amends: See § Repealed enactments
- Repeals/revokes: See § Repealed enactments
- Amended by: Coal Industry Act 1994
- Repealed by: International Development Act 2002

Status: Repealed

Text of statute as originally enacted

Revised text of statute as amended

The Overseas Development and Co-operation Act 1980 (c. 63) was an act of the Parliament of the United Kingdom that consolidated enactments relating to overseas development and co-operation.

== Provisions ==
=== Repealed enactments ===
Section 18(1) of the act repealed 30 enactments and 2 instruments, listed in parts I and II of schedule 2 to the act, respectively.

Part I — Enactments Repealed
Citation	Short title	Extent of repeal
9 & 10 Geo. 6. c. 19	Bretton Woods Agreements Act 1945	The whole act.
12 & 13 Geo. 6. c. 50	Colonial Loans Act 1949	The whole act.
1 & 2 Eliz. 2. c. 1	Colonial Loans Act 1952	The whole act.
4 & 5 Eliz. 2. c. 5	International Finance Corporation Act 1955	The whole act.
6 & 7 Eliz. 2. c. 14	Overseas Service Act 1958	The whole act.
7 & 8 Eliz. 2. c. 17	International Bank and Monetary Fund Act 1959	The whole act.
8 & 9 Eliz. 2. c. 6	Commonwealth Scholarships Act 1959	The whole act.
8 & 9 Eliz. 2. c. 35	International Development Association Act 1960	The whole act.
8 & 9 Eliz. 2. c. 40	Commonwealth Teachers Act 1960	The whole act.
10 & 11 Eliz. 2. c. 41	Colonial Loans Act 1962	The whole act.
1963 c. 6	Commonwealth Scholarships (Amendment) Act 1963	The whole act.
1964 c. 13	International Development Association Act 1964	The whole act.
1965 c. 38	Overseas Development and Service Act 1965	The whole act.
1966 c. 21	Overseas Aid Act 1966	The whole act.
1967 c. 77	Police (Scotland) Act 1967	In Schedule 4, the entry relating to the Overseas Service Act 1958.
1968 c. 13	National Loans Act 1968	In section 2, the words from "and" to "agreements)".
1968 c. 13	National Loans Act 1968	In section 10, subsections (1) and (2), and in subsection (6), the words "of any of the Acts mentioned in subsections (1) and (3) of this section and".
1968 c. 13	National Loans Act 1968	Schedule 2.
1968 c. 39	Gas and Electricity Act 1968	Section 5.
1968 c. 57	Overseas Aid Act 1968	The whole act.
1969 c. 48	Post Office Act 1969	Section 8(b).
1969 c. 51	Development of Tourism Act 1969	Section 5(4).
1971 c. 16	Coal Industry Act 1971	Section 5.
1972 c. 40	Overseas Investment and Export Guarantees Act 1972	The whole act.
1972 c. 60	Gas Act 1972	Section 6(7).
1976 c. 75	Development of Rural Wales Act 1976	Section 7.
1977 c. 3	Aircraft and Shipbuilding Industries Act 1977	Section 3(6), so far as it relates to British Shipbuilders.
1977 c. 6	International Finance, Trade and Aid Act 1977	The whole act.
1977 c. 39	Coal Industry Act 1977	In Schedule 4, paragraph 4.
1977 c. 49	National Health Service Act 1977	Section 24.
1978 c. 29	National Health Service (Scotland) Act 1978	Section 17.
1979 c. 11	Electricity (Scotland) Act 1979	Section 16.

Part II — Orders Revoked
Citation	Title	Extent of revocation
SI 1968/1656	Minister for the Civil Service Order 1968	In the Schedule, the entry relating to section 2(3) and (4) of the Overseas Development and Service Act 1965.
SI 1977/485	Asian Development Bank (Extension of Limit on Guarantees) Order 1977	The whole order.

== Subsequent developments ==
The whole act was repealed by sections 15 and 19 of, and schedule 4 to, the International Development Act 2002, which came into force on 17 June 2002.
