= Coal Mines Act 1930 =

Act of the Parliament of the United Kingdom

Coal Mines Act 1930 (Note: Section 19(1).)
- Act of Parliament
- Parliament of the United Kingdom
- Long title: An Act to provide for regulating and facilitating the production, supply and sale of coal by owners of coal mines; for the temporary amendment of section three of the Coal Mines Regulation Act, 1908; for the constitution and functions of a Coal Mines National Industrial Board; and for purposes connected with the matters aforesaid.
- Citation: 20 & 21 Geo. 5. c. 34
- Territorial extent: England and Wales; Scotland; (Note: Section 19(2).)

Dates
- Royal assent: 1 August 1930
- Commencement: 1 February 1931 (section 14) (Note: Section 14(2).)
- Repealed: 1 January 1947
Other legislation
| Amends | Coal Mines Regulation Act 1908 |
| Amended by | Coal Act 1938 |
| Repealed by | Coal Industry Nationalisation Act 1946 |

Status: Repealed

Text of statute as originally enacted

The Coal Mines Act 1930 (20 & 21 Geo. 5. c. 34) was an act of the Parliament of the United Kingdom which introduced a system of quotas in the coal mining industry of Great Britain. The act was a major achievement of the Labour Party, which revoked the eight hour day that had been enacted in 1926, replacing it with a 7 1/2 hour day. Mine owners were allowed to fix quotas and minimum prices. Theoretically, the new commission was to plan to close less-efficient pits, but it was not effective. Historian A. J. P. Taylor says that:

on the contrary, the act protected the inefficient. It operated restriction and stable prices at the expense of the consumer. Here was the pattern for British capitalism in the thirties.

The act created the Coal Mines Reorganization Commission, consisting of five commissioners.
