= Coal Act 1938 =

Act of the Parliament of the United Kingdom

Coal Act 1938 (Note: Section 58(1).)
- Act of Parliament
- Parliament of the United Kingdom
- Long title: An Act to make provision for the acquisition of the property in all unworked coal and mines of coal and in certain associated minerals, and of certain associated property and rights in land, by a Commission with power of management thereover; for amending the enactments relating to facilities for the working of minerals; for empowering the commission to promote a reduction in the number of coal-mining undertakings; for continuing Part I of the Coal Mines Act, 1930, and for amending the provisions thereof with respect to committees of investigation; for enabling land to be acquired compulsorily for the purposes of the miners welfare committee; and for purposes connected with the matters aforesaid.
- Citation: 1 & 2 Geo. 6. c. 52
- Territorial extent: England and Wales; Scotland; (Note: Section 58(2).)

Dates
- Royal assent: 29 July 1938
- Commencement: 29 July 1938 (Note: The Acts of Parliament (Commencement) Act 1793.)
- Repealed: 31 October 1994 (Note: The Coal Industry Act 1994 (Commencement No. 2 and Transitional Provision) Order 1994 (SI 1994/2552).)
Other legislation
Amends	Mines (Working Facilities and Support) Act 1923; Mining Industry Act 1926; Coal Mines Act 1930
Amended by	Mines (Working Facilities and Support) Act 1966; Coal Industry Act 1975; Statute Law (Repeals) Act 1986
Repealed by	Coal Industry Nationalisation Act 1946; Statute Law (Repeals) Act 1973; Coal Industry Act 1994
Relates to	Coal Mines Act 1930

Status: Repealed

Text of statute as originally enacted

Revised text of statute as amended

The Coal Act 1938 (1 & 2 Geo. 6. c. 52) was an act of the Parliament of the United Kingdom that created the Coal Commission. Criticized for its inconsistencies, the act was repealed, by degrees, over the next several decades.

== Provisions ==
The main purpose of the act was to create a Coal Commission, consisting of five people (including a chairman) appointed by the Board of Trade. The commission was required to obey all requests of the Board of Trade that were in the "national interest", making it directly under the control of the government of the day. From 1 July 1942 all unworked coal seams and coal mines came into the control of the Commission, who were tasked with managing them in "the interests efficiency and better organisation of the Coal Mining Industry". The Commission was directly prohibited from engaging in coal mining, and as a result owned all the coal but was not allowed to deal with it.

The act set a sum of £66.5 million (worth approximately £3,900 million as of 2025) to be paid to the owners of mines and coal seams as compensation. The amount was divided up per region so that, for example, a Yorkshire coal owner would claim from the Yorkshire Coalfield division of the Central Valuation Board. The act was criticised by academics as a piece of socialist legislation passed by a Conservative government, which as a result contained so many amendments, provisos and limitations that it was in many ways unworkable. As an example, the Commission was allowed to open up new underground workings, but was prohibited from disturbing the surface of the ground. It was repealed over several decades by the Coal Industry Nationalisation Act 1946 (9 & 10 Geo. 6. c. 59), the Mines (Working Facilities and Support) Act 1966, the Coal Industry Act 1975 and the Coal Industry Act 1994.

== Subsequent developments ==
The following provisions were repealed by section 1(1) of, and part X of schedule 1 to, the Statute Law (Repeals) Act 1973, which came into force on 18 July 1973.

- Section 1.
- Section 3(1).
- In section 3(2), the words " During the period between " and the words from " all coal " onwards.
- Section 3(3).
- Section 4.

Section 6 except subsection (2).

- Sections 7–10.
- Sections 12, 13, 17(3), 18, 20 and 21.
- Sections 23–31.
- Sections 35–40.
- Section 42(2).
- In section 42(3), the words " and in the said Table " and the words from " and ' private ' " onwards. Section 43(3).
- In section 43(4), the words " and the Fourth and Fifth Schedules to this Act ". Section 45(9), (10) and (11).
- Sections 56 and 57.
- Schedules 1, 3, 4 and 5.

== Bibliography ==
- Lang, J.H.A. (1939). "The Coal Act, 1938". Modern Law Review. 2 (4). Blackwell Publishing. ISSN 0026-7961.
