= Coal Industry Nationalisation Act 1946 =

Act of the Parliament of the United Kingdom

Coal Industry Nationalisation Act 1946 (Note: Section 16(1).)
- Act of Parliament
- Parliament of the United Kingdom
- Long title: An Act to establish public ownership and control of the coal-mining industry and certain allied activities; and for purposes connected therewith.
- Citation: 9 & 10 Geo. 6. c. 59
- Introduced by: Minister of Fuel and Power, Manny Shinwell (Commons)
- Territorial extent: England and Wales; Scotland; (Note: Section 16(2).)

Dates
- Royal assent: 12 July 1946
- Commencement: 1 January 1947 (Note: Section 16(3).)
Other legislation
Amends	Mining Industry Act 1926; Coal Act 1938
Repeals/revokes	Coal Mines Act 1930
Amended by	Coal Industry Act 1949; Statute Law Revision Act 1950; Income Tax Act 1952; Miners' Welfare Act 1952; Law Reform (Limitation of Actions, etc.) Act 1954; Coal Industry Act 1956; Minister of Fuel and Power (Change of Style and Title) Order 1957; Public Records Act 1958; Charities Act 1960; Coal Consumers' Councils (Northern Irish Interests) Act 1962; Coal Industry Act 1962; Statute Law Revision Act 1963; Coal Industry Act 1965; Mines (Working Facilities and Support) Act 1966; National Loans Act 1968; Coal Industry Act 1971; European Communities Act 1972; Statute Law (Repeals) Act 1973; Coal Industry Act 1977; Statute Law (Repeals) Act 1986; Coal Industry Act 1987; Coal Industry Act 1990; Statute Law (Repeals) Act 1993; Coal Industry Act 1994; Abolition of Feudal Tenure etc. (Scotland) Act 2000

Status: Partially repealed

Text of statute as originally enacted

Revised text of statute as amended

Text of the Coal Industry Nationalisation Act 1946 as in force today (including any amendments) within the United Kingdom, from legislation.gov.uk.

The Coal Industry Nationalisation Act 1946 (9 & 10 Geo. 6. c. 59) is an act of the Parliament of the United Kingdom which nationalised, or brought into state control, the coal industry in Great Britain (Northern Ireland was excluded). It established the National Coal Board as the managing authority for coal mining and coal processing activities. It also initially provided for the establishment of consumers' councils. The Coal Industry Nationalisation Act 1946 was the first of a number of Acts promulgated by the post-war Labour government to nationalise elements of the UK's industrial infrastructure; other Acts include the Electricity Act 1947; the Transport Act 1947 (railways and long-distance road haulage); the Gas Act 1948; and the Iron and Steel Act 1949.

At the time of the passage of the bill, coal amounted for more than 90% of the energy consumption of Great Britain.

== Background ==
The Coal Industry Nationalisation Bill was published in December 1945 by the Minister of Fuel and Power, Emanuel Shinwell, and got passed through the House of Commons by his Parliamentary Secretary Hugh Gaitskell. Several commentators have noted that the bill was imperfect and had been 'hastily cobbled together', just four months after the King's Speech. However, this approach was expedient for the government as the coal mining industry was in a poor state following the war and the Labour government wished to show that their manifesto commitments were being implemented.

The coal industry nationalisation was different to later enactments. The owners of coal mines and facilities were compensated with government stock; this demonstrated to the miners, who were powerful political force, that the industry belonged to the nation. For later nationalisations compensation was by stock issued by the relevant board. This simplified the system as compensation was based in the market value of shares in the relevant undertaking.

== Coal Industry Nationalisation Act 1946 ==
The Coal Industry Nationalisation Act 1946 received royal assent on 12 July 1946. Its long title is 'An Act to establish public ownership and control of the coal-mining industry and certain allied activities; and for purposes connected therewith.'

=== Provisions ===
The provisions of the act comprise 65 sections in nine parts, plus four schedules.

- The National Coal Board
  Sections 1–4: Establishment of National Coal Board, its functions, constitution, power of the Minister, and establishment of Consumers' councils,
- Transfer of assets to the Board
  Sections 5–9: Transfer of assets; interests in patents and designs; rights and liabilities; use of certain property; determination of questions of transfer,
- Compensation for transfer of assets
  Sections 10–16: Compensation for transfer and basis for assessment; allocation of transferred interests; Central and District Valuation Boards; compensation; payment of costs; time limits,
- Compensation for severance, and refunds of capital outlay
  Sections 17 & 18: Compensation for severance; refund of capital outlay
- Satisfaction and disposal of compensation
  Sections 19–25: Date of compensation; recipients of compensation; mode of satisfaction; interim income; satisfaction of compensation; restrictions on disposal of stock; protection; debenture and shareholders of companies,
- Financial provisions
  Sections 26–35: Advances by the minister; borrowing powers; payments to the minister; reserve fund; surplus revenues; accounts and audits; issue of stock; general provisions of stock; Consolidated Fund; payments and advances to the Board; account of receipts,
- Savings, and provisions consequential on nationalisation
  Sections 36–45: Provision of superannuation rights; transfer of property; functions of the Coal Commission; abolition of coal advisory committee; Miners' Welfare Commission; safety and health research; winding-up of coal-selling schemes; Doncaster Drainage District,
- Miscellaneous provisions as to the Board
  Sections 46–54: Terms and conditions of employment; taxation; transfer of liability for subsidence; liability of the board; workmen's compensation liabilities; documents of the board; plans of workings; transferred documents; annual report,
- General
  Sections 55–65: Payment of certain expenses; disclosure of information; penalties; prosecutions and offences; notices; arbitration; regulations; interpretation application to Scotland; short title, extent and repeal.
- First schedule
  Assets to be transferred to the board
- Second schedule
  Transfer to the board of rights and liabilities under contracts
- Third schedule
  Provisions as to Selling Schemes under part I of the Coal Mines Act 1930, and as to the South Yorkshire Mines Drainage Committee
- Fourth schedule
  Enactments repealed

== Later enactments ==
The following acts amended elements of the 1946 act.

Coal Industry Act 1949 (Note: Section 13(1).)
- Act of Parliament
- Parliament of the United Kingdom
- Long title: An Act to alter the composition of the National Coal Board, extend the area within which their activities may be carried on, empower them to terminate certain long-term contracts and provide for the enforcement against them of certain workmen's compensation liabilities; to amend sections thirty-seven and sixty-four of the Coal Industry Nationalisation Act, 1946, and authorise the making of certain payments in connection with the settlement of disputes arising under regulations made under the said section thirty-seven and to repeal the provisions of that Act imposing restrictions on the disposal of government stock issued for compensation to companies; to extend the power of the Minister of Fuel and Power to make general regulations under section eighty-six of the Coal Mines Act, 1911, and otherwise to amend that section; and for purposes connected with the matters aforesaid.
- Citation: 12, 13 & 14 Geo. 6. c. 53
- Territorial extent: England and Wales; Scotland; (Note: Section 13(3).)

Dates
- Royal assent: 30 July 1949
- Commencement: 30 July 1949 (Note: The Acts of Parliament (Commencement) Act 1793.)
Other legislation
Amends	Coal Mines Act 1911; Mining Industry Act 1926; Defence (General) Regulations 1939; Coal Industry Nationalisation Act 1946
Amended by	Statute Law Revision Act 1953; Mines and Quarries Act 1954; Minister of Labour Order 1959; Coal Industry Act 1971; Coal Industry Act 1977; Transfer of Functions (Minister for the Civil Service and Treasury) Order 1981; Coal Industry Act 1987; Coal Industry Act 1994

Status: Partially repealed

Text of statute as originally enacted

Revised text of statute as amended

Text of the Coal Industry Act 1949 as in force today (including any amendments) within the United Kingdom, from legislation.gov.uk.

The Coal Industry Act 1949 (12, 13 & 14 Geo. 6. c. 53) amended and repealed parts of the 1946 act including the composition of the National Coal Board; extended the area of relevant activities; and terminated contracts.

Miners' Welfare Act 1952 (Note: Section 18(1).)
- Act of Parliament
- Parliament of the United Kingdom
- Long title: An Act to discontinue the royalties welfare levy, dissolve the Miners' Welfare Commission and wind up the miners' welfare fund; to provide for the determination of certain trusts and agreements relating to property derived from the said fund, for the transfer to the National Coal Board or the Coal Industry Social Welfare Organisation of certain property, rights, liabilities, obligations and functions, and for requiring the said Board to make certain payments to the said organisation; to provide for the superannuation of employees of the said organisation; to amend section forty-one of the Coal Industry Nationalisation Act, 1946; and for purposes connected with the matters aforesaid.
- Citation: 15 & 16 Geo. 6. & 1 Eliz. 2. c. 23
- Territorial extent: England and Wales; Scotland; (Note: Section 18(2).)

Dates
- Royal assent: 30 April 1952
- Commencement: 1 July 1952 (Note: Section 1(2).)
Other legislation
Amends	Mining Industry Act 1920; Mining Industry Act 1926; Coal Industry Nationalisation Act 1946
Repeals/revokes	Mining Industry (Welfare Fund) Act 1934; Mining Industry (Welfare Fund) Act 1939; Mining Industry (Welfare Fund) Act 1943
Amended by	Minister of Fuel and Power (Change of Style and Title) Order 1957; Minister of Technology Order 1969; Secretary of State for Trade and Industry Order 1970; Statute Law (Repeals) Act 1974; Land Registration (Scotland) Act 1979; Coal Industry Act 1987; Constitutional Reform Act 2005

Status: Amended

Text of statute as originally enacted

Revised text of statute as amended

Text of the Miners' Welfare Act 1952 as in force today (including any amendments) within the United Kingdom, from legislation.gov.uk.

The Miners' Welfare Act 1952 (15 & 16 Geo. 6. & 1 Eliz. 2. c. 23) dissolved the Miners' Welfare Commission.

Coal Industry Act 1956 (Note: Section 2(1).)
- Act of Parliament
- Parliament of the United Kingdom
- Long title: An Act to extend the power of the Minister of Fuel and Power to make advances to the National Coal Board for capital purposes; and to alter the financial year of the National Coal Board.
- Citation: 4 & 5 Eliz. 2. c. 61
- Territorial extent: England and Wales; Scotland; (Note: Section 2(2).)

Dates
- Royal assent: 2 August 1956
- Commencement: 2 August 1956
- Repealed: 22 December 1965
Other legislation
Amends	Coal Industry Nationalisation Act 1946
Repealed by	Coal Industry Act 1965

Status: Repealed

Text of statute as originally enacted

The Coal Industry Act 1956 (4 & 5 Eliz. 2. c. 61).

Coal Industry Act 1965 (Note: Section 5(1).)
- Act of Parliament
- Parliament of the United Kingdom
- Long title: An Act to make provision with respect to borrowing by, and loans by the Minister of Power to, the National Coal Board; with respect to the capital reconstruction, and the application of certain funds, of that Board; for the making of grants with the object of accelerating the redeployment of the manpower resources of that Board and the elimination of uneconomic colliery capacity; with respect to pensions or compensation for certain persons who have been members of that Board; and for connected purposes.
- Citation: 1965 c. 82
- Territorial extent: England and Wales; Scotland; (Note: Section 5(4).)

Dates
- Royal assent: 22 December 1965
- Commencement: 22 December 1965
- Repealed: 27 March 2004 (Note: The Coal Industry Act 1994 (Commencement No.7) and Dissolution of the British Coal Corporation Order 2004.)
Other legislation
Amends	Coal Industry Nationalisation Act 1946; Coal Industry Act 1951; Coal Industry Act 1962
Repeals/revokes	Coal Industry Act 1956; Coal Industry Act 1960; Coal Industry Act 1961
Amended by	Coal Industry Act 1973; Statute Law (Repeals) Act 1974; Coal Industry Act 1977; Coal Industry Act 1987; Coal Industry Act 1994
Repealed by	Coal Industry Act 1994

Status: Repealed

Text of statute as originally enacted

Revised text of statute as amended

Text of the Coal Industry Act 1965 as in force today (including any amendments) within the United Kingdom, from legislation.gov.uk.

The Coal Industry Act 1965 (c. 82) made provision for borrowing by, and loans by the Minister of Power to, the National Coal Board.

The Mines (Working Facilities and Support) Act 1966 consolidated part I of the Mines (Working Facilities and Support) Act 1923 (13 & 14 Geo. 5. c. 20).

Coal Industry Act 1971 (Note: Section 10(1).)
- Act of Parliament
- Parliament of the United Kingdom
- Long title: An Act to provide further finance for the National Coal Board in respect of pit closures and for the making of payments to workers in the coal industry made redundant; to increase the limit of the Board's accumulated deficit and provide for its subsequent alteration by order of the Secretary of State; to enable the Board to borrow money otherwise than in sterling and to join in furnishing technical assistance overseas; to make further provision as to the power of the Secretary of State to give directions to the Board with respect to their activities and accounts; and for purposes connected with the matters aforesaid.
- Citation: 1971 c. 16
- Territorial extent: England and Wales; Scotland; (Note: Section 10(4).)

Dates
- Royal assent: 30 March 1971
- Commencement: 30 March 1971
Other legislation
Amends	Coal Industry Nationalisation Act 1946; Coal Industry Act 1949; Coal Industry Act 1965; Coal Industry Act 1967
Amended by	Coal Industry Act 1973; Coal Industry Act 1977; Overseas Development and Co-operation Act 1980; Coal Industry Act 1987; Coal Industry Act 1994

Status: Amended

Text of statute as originally enacted

Revised text of statute as amended

Text of the Coal Industry Act 1971 as in force today (including any amendments) within the United Kingdom, from legislation.gov.uk.

The Coal Industry Act 1971 (c. 16) extended the powers of the National Coal Board.

The following provisions were repealed by section 1(1) of, and part X of schedule 1 to, the Statute Law (Repeals) Act 1973, which came into force on 18 July 1973.

- Section 5(4).
- Sections 10–25.
- In section 28(1), paragraph (a).
- In section 38(3), paragraph (a), the words from " subsection (6) " to " and in ", the words " six, seven and " and the words from " section thirty-nine " to " Fifth Schedule ".
- Section 38(5).
- In section 55, the words from " and subsection (7) " onwards.
- Section 64(5).
- In Schedule 3, paragraphs 7 and 13.

Coal Industry Act 1977 (Note: Section 16(1).)
- Act of Parliament
- Parliament of the United Kingdom
- Long title: An Act to increase the limit on the borrowing powers of the National Coal Board, to provide for grants by the Secretary of State to the Board and other persons, to extend the Board's powers and the power to provide pensions and other benefits under the Coal Industry Nationalisation Act 1946.
- Citation: 1977 c. 39
- Territorial extent: England and Wales; Scotland; (Note: Section 16(3).)

Dates
- Royal assent: 29 July 1977
- Commencement: 29 August 1977 (Note: Section 16(2).)
Other legislation
Amends	Coal Industry Nationalisation Act 1946; Coal Industry Act 1949; Coal Industry Act 1965; Coal Industry Act 1967; Coal Industry Act 1971; Coal Industry Act 1973; National Coal Board (Finance) Act 1976
Amended by	Coal Industry Act 1977; Coal Industry Act 1980; Overseas Development and Co-operation Act 1980; Coal Industry Act 1983; Companies Consolidation (Consequential Provisions) Act 1985; Coal Industry Act 1987; Companies Act 1989; Coal Industry Act 1994

Status: Partially repealed

Text of statute as originally enacted

Revised text of statute as amended

Text of the Coal Industry Act 1977 as in force today (including any amendments) within the United Kingdom, from legislation.gov.uk.

The Coal Industry Act 1977 (c. 39) amended the financial powers of the National Coal Board.

The Coal Industry Act 1987 (c. 3) changed the name of the National Coal Board to the British Coal Corporation.

Coal Industry Act 1990 (Note: Section 6(1).)
- Act of Parliament
- Parliament of the United Kingdom
- Long title: An Act to make new provision with respect to grants by the Secretary of State to the British Coal Corporation and further provision with respect to grants and loans under existing powers; and to make provision as to the licensing of coal working, searching and boring and the preservation of amenity in connection with opencast coal working.
- Citation: 1990 c. 3
- Territorial extent: England and Wales; Scotland; (Note: Section 6(3).)

Dates
- Royal assent: 19 March 1990
- Commencement: 19 May 1990 (Note: Section 6(2).)
Other legislation
Amends	Coal Industry Nationalisation Act 1946; Opencast Coal Act 1958; Coal Industry Act 1980; Coal Industry Act 1987
Amended by	Coal Industry Act 1994

Status: Partially repealed

Text of statute as originally enacted

Revised text of statute as amended

Text of the Coal Industry Act 1990 as in force today (including any amendments) within the United Kingdom, from legislation.gov.uk.

The Coal Industry Act 1990 (c. 3) made new provision for grants by the Secretary of State to the British Coal Corporation.

The Coal Industry Act 1994 (c. 21) established the functions of a new body the Coal Authority; restructured the coal industry, transferred the property, rights and liabilities of the British Coal Corporation and its wholly owned subsidiaries; and made provision for the dissolution of the corporation; abolished the Domestic Coal Consumers' Council.

== See also ==
- Nationalisation
- History of coal mining § United Kingdom
- Coal mining in the United Kingdom
