= Mining Remediation Authority =

UK non-departmental public body

- Formation: 31 October 1994; 31 years ago
- Legal status: Non-departmental public body (NDPB)
- Purpose: Making a better future for people and the environment in mining areas
- Location: Mansfield, Nottinghamshire
- Region served: Great Britain
- Chief Executive: Lisa Pinney
- Chairman: Jeff Halliwell
- Main organ: Mining Remediation Authority Board
- Parent organization: Department for Energy Security and Net Zero
- Staff: 300 (2021 to 2022)
- Website: www.miningremediation.co.uk

The Mining Remediation Authority is a non-departmental public body of the United Kingdom government sponsored by the Department for Energy Security and Net Zero (DESNZ). It owns the vast majority of unworked coal in Great Britain, as well as former coal mines, and undertakes a range of functions including:

- licensing coal mining operations
- matters with respect to coal mining subsidence damage outside the areas of responsibility of coal mining licensees
- dealing with property and historical liability issues; for example environmental projects, mine water treatment schemes and surface hazards relating to past coal mining
- providing public access to information held by the Mining Remediation Authority on coal mining

The Mining Remediation Authority changed its public name from the Coal Authority in November 2024. As of 2025, the Coal Authority remains the legal name of the organisation, as set by law.

== Purpose ==
The Mining Remediation Authority’s stated purpose is to:

- keep people safe and provide peace of mind
- protect and enhance the environment
- use its information and expertise to help people make informed decisions
- create value and minimise cost to the taxpayer

The Mining Remediation Authority provides services to other government departments and agencies, local governments and commercial partners, while contributing to the delivery of the government’s Industrial Strategy and the 25-year Environment Plan.

As a public body that holds significant geospatial data it is also working with the Geospatial Commission to look at how, by working together, it can unlock significant value across the economy.

As part of the Mining Remediation Authority's duty to protect the public and the environment, it operates a 24-hour telephone line for reporting coal mine hazards and operates 82 mine water treatment schemes across the UK, cleaning more than 122 billion litres of mine water every year.

== Governance and strategy ==
The Mining Remediation Authority has an independent board responsible for setting its strategic direction, policies and priorities, while ensuring its statutory duties are carried out effectively. Non-executive directors are recruited and appointed to the board by the Secretary of State for DESNZ. Executive directors are recruited to their posts by the board and appointed to the board by the Secretary of State for DESNZ.

== History ==
Coal Industry Act 1994 (Note: Section 68(1).)
- Act of Parliament
- Parliament of the United Kingdom
- Long title: An Act to provide for the establishment and functions of a body to be known as the Coal Authority; to provide for the restructuring of the coal industry, for transfers of the property, rights and liabilities of the British Coal Corporation and its wholly-owned subsidiaries to other persons and for the dissolution of that Corporation; to abolish the Domestic Coal Consumers' Council; to make provision for the licensing of coal-mining operations and provision otherwise in relation to the carrying on of such operations; to amend the Coal Mining Subsidence Act 1991 and the Opencast Coal Act 1958; and for connected purposes.
- Citation: 1994 c. 21
- Territorial extent: England and Wales (in part); Scotland (in part); Northern Ireland (in part); (Note: Section 68(7)–(9).)

Dates
- Royal assent: 5 July 1994
- Commencement: various (Note: Section 68(2)–(6).)

Other legislation
- Amends: Land Registration Act 1925; Coal Act 1938; Requisitioned Land and War Works Act 1945; Coal Industry Nationalisation Act 1946; Statistics of Trade Act 1947; Acquisition of Land (Authorisation Procedure) (Scotland) Act 1947; Coal Industry Act 1949; Landlord and Tenant Act 1954; Public Records Act 1958; Opencast Coal Act 1958; Public Health Act 1961; Licensing Act 1964; Continental Shelf Act 1964; Gas Act 1965; Coal Industry Act 1965; Mines (Working Facilities and Support) Act 1966; Land Commission Act 1967; Parliamentary Commissioner Act 1967; Gaming Act 1968; Coal Industry Act 1971; Town and Country Planning (Scotland) Act 1972; Fair Trading Act 1973; Consumer Credit Act 1974; House of Commons Disqualification Act 1975; Coal Industry Act 1975; Welsh Development Agency Act 1975; Restrictive Trade Practices Act 1976; Local Government (Miscellaneous Provisions) Act 1976; Development of Rural Wales Act 1976; Coal Industry Act 1977; Land Registration (Scotland) Act 1979; Estate Agents Act 1979; Ancient Monuments and Archaeological Areas Act 1979; Competition Act 1980; Overseas Development and Co-operation Act 1980; Local Government, Planning and Land Act 1980; Highways Act 1980; Acquisition of Land Act 1981; Civic Government (Scotland) Act 1982; National Audit Act 1983; Road Traffic Regulation Act 1984; Roads (Scotland) Act 1984; Companies Act 1985; Housing Act 1985; Weights and Measures Act 1985; Agricultural Holdings Act 1986; Coal Industry Act 1987; Housing Act 1988; Electricity Act 1989; Coal Industry Act 1990; Town and Country Planning Act 1990; Planning (Listed Buildings and Conservation Areas) Act 1990; Planning (Consequential Provisions) Act 1990; Coal Mining Subsidence Act 1991; Water Industry Act 1991; Water Resources Act 1991; Land Drainage Act 1991; Leasehold Reform, Housing and Urban Development Act 1993
- Repeals/revokes: Miners' Welfare Act 1952; Coal Consumers' Councils (Northern Irish Interests) Act 1962; Coal Industry Act 1992; British Coal and British Rail (Transfer Proposals) Act 1993
- Amended by: Environment Act 1995 (Consequential and Transitional Provisions) (Scotland) Regulations 1996; Planning (Consequential Provisions) (Scotland) Act 1997; Petroleum Act 1998; Competition Act 1998; Statute Law (Repeals) Act 1998; Abolition of Feudal Tenure etc. (Scotland) Act 2000; Capital Allowances Act 2001; Land Registration Act 2002; Enterprise Act 2002; Financial Services and Markets Act 2000 (Consequential Amendments) Order 2002; Licensing Act 2003; Water Act 2003; Statute Law (Repeals) Act 2004; Income Tax (Trading and Other Income) Act 2005; Gambling Act 2005; Water Services etc. (Scotland) Act 2005; Taxation of Pension Schemes (Consequential Amendments) Order 2006; Companies Act 2006 (Commencement No. 3, Consequential Amendments, Transitional Provisions and Savings) Order 2007; Finance Act 2008; Legislative Reform (Health and Safety Executive) Order 2008; Consumer Protection from Unfair Trading Regulations 2008; Companies Act 2006 (Consequential Amendments, Transitional Provisions and Savings) Order 2009; Transfer of Tribunal Functions (Lands Tribunal and Miscellaneous Amendments) Order 2009; Energy Act 2011; Financial Services Act 2012; Land Registration etc. (Scotland) Act 2012; Tribunals, Courts and Enforcement Act 2007 (Consequential Amendments) Order 2012; Financial Services Act 2012 (Consumer Credit) Order 2013; Natural Resources Body for Wales (Functions) Order 2013; Enterprise and Regulatory Reform Act 2013 (Competition) (Consequential, Transitional and Saving Provisions) Order 2014; Planning (Wales) Act 2015; Housing and Planning Act 2016; Enterprise and Regulatory Reform Act 2013 (Consequential Amendments) (Bankruptcy) and the Small Business, Enterprise and Employment Act 2015 (Consequential Amendments) Regulations 2016; Wales Act 2017; Water Act 2014 (Consequential Amendments etc.) Order 2017; Local Government and Elections (Wales) Act 2021; Digital Markets, Competition and Consumers Act 2024; Infrastructure (Wales) Act 2024; Digital Markets, Competition and Consumers Act 2024 (Consequential Amendments) Regulations 2025

Status: Amended

Text of statute as originally enacted

Revised text of statute as amended

Text of the Coal Industry Act 1994 as in force today (including any amendments) within the United Kingdom, from legislation.gov.uk.

It was established under the Coal Industry Act 1994 (c. 21) to manage some functions, in which the British Coal Corporation (formerly the National Coal Board) had previously undertaken, including ownership of unworked coal. In November 2024, the organisation's name was changed from the Coal Authority to the Mining Remediation Authority to "better reflect the organisation’s 24/7 role to manage the effects of historical mining in England, Scotland and Wales and its work to seek low-carbon opportunities from our mining heritage for the future."

The Mining Remediation Authority's public task comprises all the functions, duties and responsibilities is set out in the following documents

- The Coal Industry Act 1994 ("the 1994 act")
- The Coal Mining Subsidence Act 1991, as amended by the 1994 act
- A Revised Coal Authority Explanatory Note, produced by the Department of Trade and Industry (DTI) for Parliament in June 1994 to explain the intended provisions of the Coal Industry Bill
- The Water Act 2003
- The Water Environment and Water Services (Scotland) Act 2003
- Statement by Lord Strathclyde in 1994 on the government's expectations of the Coal Authority relating to mine water remediation
- Re-statement by John Battle MP in 1998 that the Coal Authority was the designated body with responsibility for dealing with mine water discharges from former coal mines
- The Energy Act 2011

Its headquarters are in Mansfield, Nottinghamshire, where its Mining Heritage Centre is also based. This archive houses a large quantity of data, including historical information, relating to coal mining in Britain.

The unique collection of around 120,000 coal abandonment plans, covering both opencast and deep mining operations, dates as far back as the 17th century and depict areas of extraction and the point of entry into the same.

Historical mine plans can be accessed for research purposes, for desktop studies prior to development or simply by members of the public with an interest in the history of mining.

The Mining Remediation Authority also has a large collection of more than 47,000 British Coal photographs, which feature a wide range of collieries and cover every aspect of coal mining.

All plans and photographs have been digitally scanned and are available to any interested parties. They can be viewed at the Mining Heritage Centre in Mansfield.

== The Water and Abandoned Metal Mines (WAMM) programme ==
To tackle the water pollution caused by historical metal mining in England, the Mining Remediation Authority works with the Environment Agency in the Water and Abandoned Metal Mines partnership, funded by the Department for Environment, Food and Rural Affairs (Defra).

== Mining reports ==
The Mining Remediation Authority’s Commercial Reports and Advisory Services provides comprehensive mining report services, include desktop reports, pre planning advice, project management and civil, structural and environmental engineering. Reports available include:

- CON29M Coal mining report – an official coal mining report for the conveyancing industry
- Ground Stability report – a CON29M report, combined with non-coal related British Geological Survey subsidence information
- Enviro All-in-One report – a CON29M report, combined with Groundsure’s homebuyers environmental report
- Consultants Coal Mining report - builds on information in a CON29M report, giving additional details such as seam names and depths. Aimed towards mining consultants
- No Search Certificate – a certificate to show that a property is not within a known area of past, present or proposed future mining activity

== Mine energy and heat ==
Abandoned coal mines are a source of geothermal energy, and could also be used for cooling and storing inter-seasonally waste or renewable energy.

As mines become flooded they have the potential to meet all of the heating needs of the coalfield communities which account for 25% of UK population. In the case of a district heating network, this energy can be transferred to a pipe network using a heat exchanger, and then distributed to nearby homes.

Abandoned coal mines present an opportunity to the UK as a source of geothermal energy, and this is being explored by the Mining Remediation Authority, which is working in partnerships with local authorities and other companies to fulfil this potential.

== Consultancy services ==
The Mining Remediation Authority provides consultancy services on:

Geothermal energy from abandoned coal mines
Geothermal energy from abandoned coal mines is a low carbon, sustainable heat source which under the right conditions can compete with public supply gas prices.
Coal mining risk assessments
When submitting a planning application within a high risk area, it is likely a Coal Mining Risk Assessment will need to be submitted.
Mine water treatment schemes
It provides expert advice and assistance to help developers understand and investigate the risks of past mining.
Tip inspection and management
It has expertise in the long term management of the risks associated with tips and delivering inspection programmes to mitigate these risks.
Water level monitoring
The Mining Remediation Authority has significant experience gained in monitoring an extensive mine water treatment scheme portfolio
Engineering design
It has a team experienced in engineering design, with many years of providing the critical information required to complete complex civil engineering projects.
Borehole drilling advice
The complex nature of mine workings can cause operational issues when drilling boreholes, which requires specialist knowledge to be carried out accurately.
Mining hydrogeology
It has a team of hydrogeologists with a wide range of experience in all types of hydrogeology, specialising in complex mining hydrogeology.

== See also ==
- Coal mining in the United Kingdom

== Sources ==
- Whitaker's Almanack 2002. London: The Stationery Office Ltd. 2001. ISBN 0-11-702279-9.
