= 1858 Bradford sweets poisoning =

Mass arsenic poisoning in England

Coordinates: 53°47′42″N 1°45′18″W

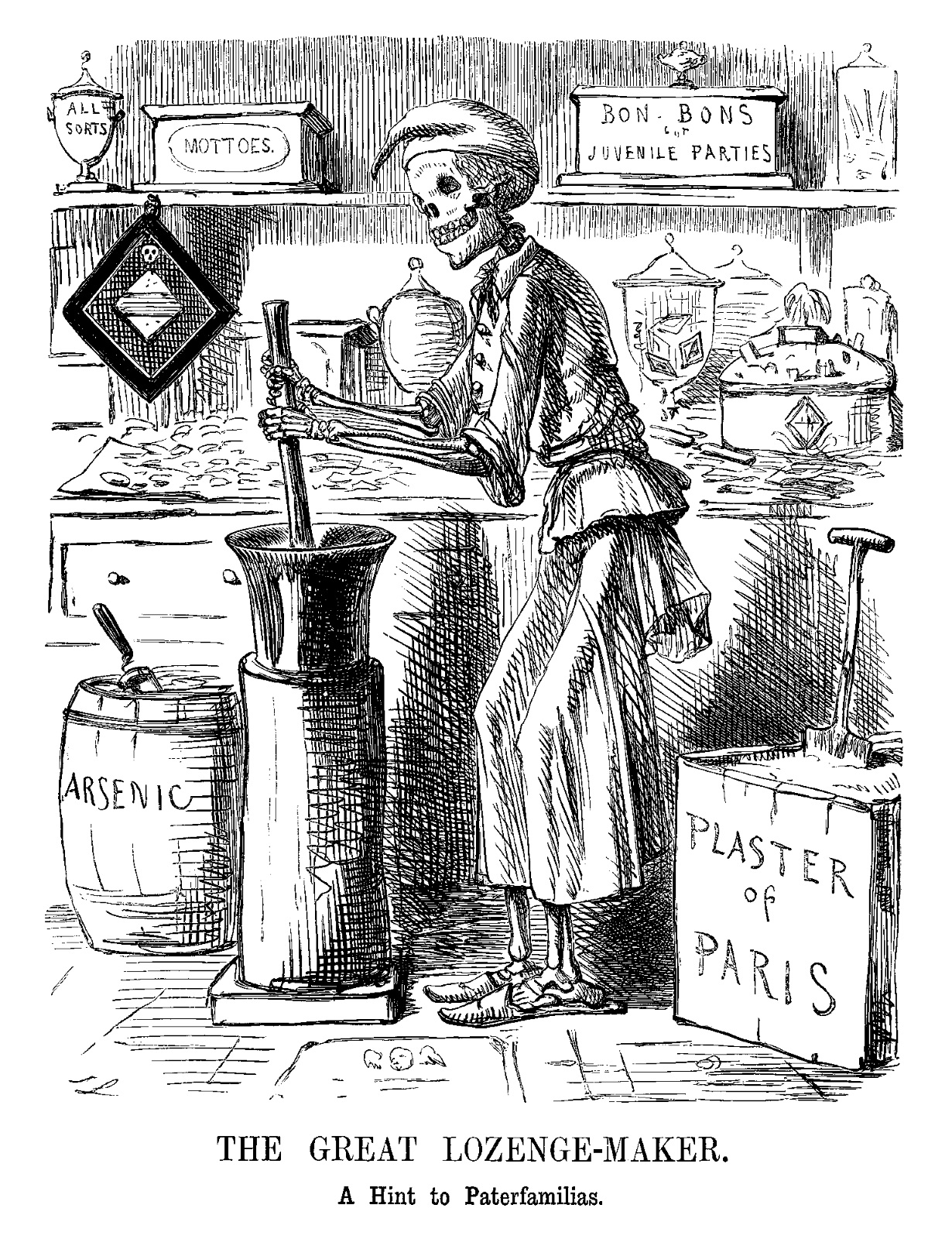
- Cartoon in Punch, November 1858
- Date: 30 October 1858
- Location: Bradford, England
- Cause: Arsenic poisoning
- Deaths: 20 or 21 (Note: Figures on the number of deaths vary, with either twenty or twenty-one people dead.)
- Injuries: 200+

In 1858 a batch of sweets in Bradford, England, was accidentally adulterated with poisonous arsenic trioxide. About five pounds (two kilograms) of sweets were sold to the public, leading to around 20 deaths and over 200 people suffering arsenic poisoning.

The adulteration of food had been practised in Britain since before the Middle Ages, but in the nineteenth century, with increasing urbanisation and the rise in shop-purchased food, adulterants became a growing problem. With the cost of sugar high, replacing it with substitutes was common. For the sweets produced in Bradford, the confectioner was supposed to purchase powdered gypsum, but a mistake at the wholesale chemist meant arsenic was purchased instead.

Three men were arrested—the chemist who sold the arsenic, his assistant and the sweet maker—but all three were acquitted after the judge decided it was all accidental and there was no case for any of them to answer. The deaths led to the Adulteration of Food or Drink Act 1860, although the legislation was criticised for being too ambiguous and the penalties for breaching it too low to act as a deterrent. The deaths were also a factor in the passage of the Pharmacy Act 1868.

== Background ==
The adulteration of food had been practised in Britain since before the Middle Ages, but in the nineteenth century, with increasing urbanisation and the rise in shop-purchased food, adulterants became a growing problem. Cost was the reason adulterants were used; sugar, for example, cost 6½d per pound; the adulterant cost ½d per pound. (Note: 6½d in 1858 is approximately equivalent to £6.98; ½d in 1858 is approximately equivalent to £0.54 in 2025, according to calculations based on the Consumer Price Index measure of inflation.) The adulteration fell into three categories: firstly were harmless additions, such as chicory in coffee, adding flour to mustard and watering down milk. More serious were the addition of indigestible ingredients, including introducing alum, gypsum or chalk into white bread or tree or shrub leaves into tea leaves. Finally, dangerous additions to foods included salts of copper and red lead glaze used as colourants, mercury salts added to cheese, and the use of arsenic, sulphuric acid and nitric acid.

The chemist Arthur Hill Hassall was prominent in the field of food analysis as an analytical microscopist who established levels of adulteration. Between 1850 and 1856 he examined 3,000 samples of food and found 65 per cent of them contained adulterants. Those involved in adulterating foodstuff used nicknames to hide the practice. These included "daff", "duck", "duff", "derby", "multum", "flash" and "stuff". One local name used in Bradford—an industrial town in the West Riding of Yorkshire—was "daft".

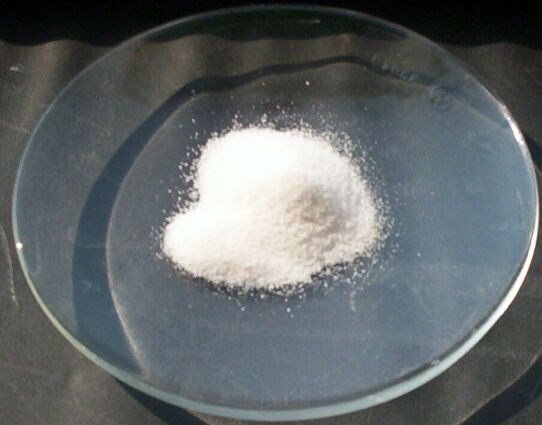
Arsenic trioxide in crystallised form

In the Victorian era, arsenic was an ingredient in several household products, including medicines (for external and internal use), candles, wallpaper, soft furnishings and colourants for foods. It was also used as a poison for murder. So many people died of arsenic poisoning—both deliberate and accidental—that legislation in the form of the Arsenic Act 1851 was introduced; it was the first piece of UK legislation to attempt to control the sale of a poisonous substance. It stated that arsenic should only be sold to adults, the sale recorded in a book—signed by both seller and buyer—and that there should be a witness to the sale if the buyer was unknown to the seller. Any arsenic not to be used for medicinal purposes was to be coloured with soot or indigo to differentiate it from other white powders on sale. There was no restriction on who could sell arsenic; no licence was required and any trader was able to sell it as long as they kept a record of the sale.

Although the act controlled the method of sale, it did not bring an end to arsenic-related problems or the widespread use of arsenic in household goods. In 1860 an article in The Lancet asked:

How to convict of arsenical poisoning when ladies use arsenical cosmetics; when confectioners sell arsenical sweetmeats; when paperhangers clothe our walls with arsenical hangings, and impregnate all the air with fine arsenical dust; above all, when chemists sell arsenic for a toothpowder and label it mercury?

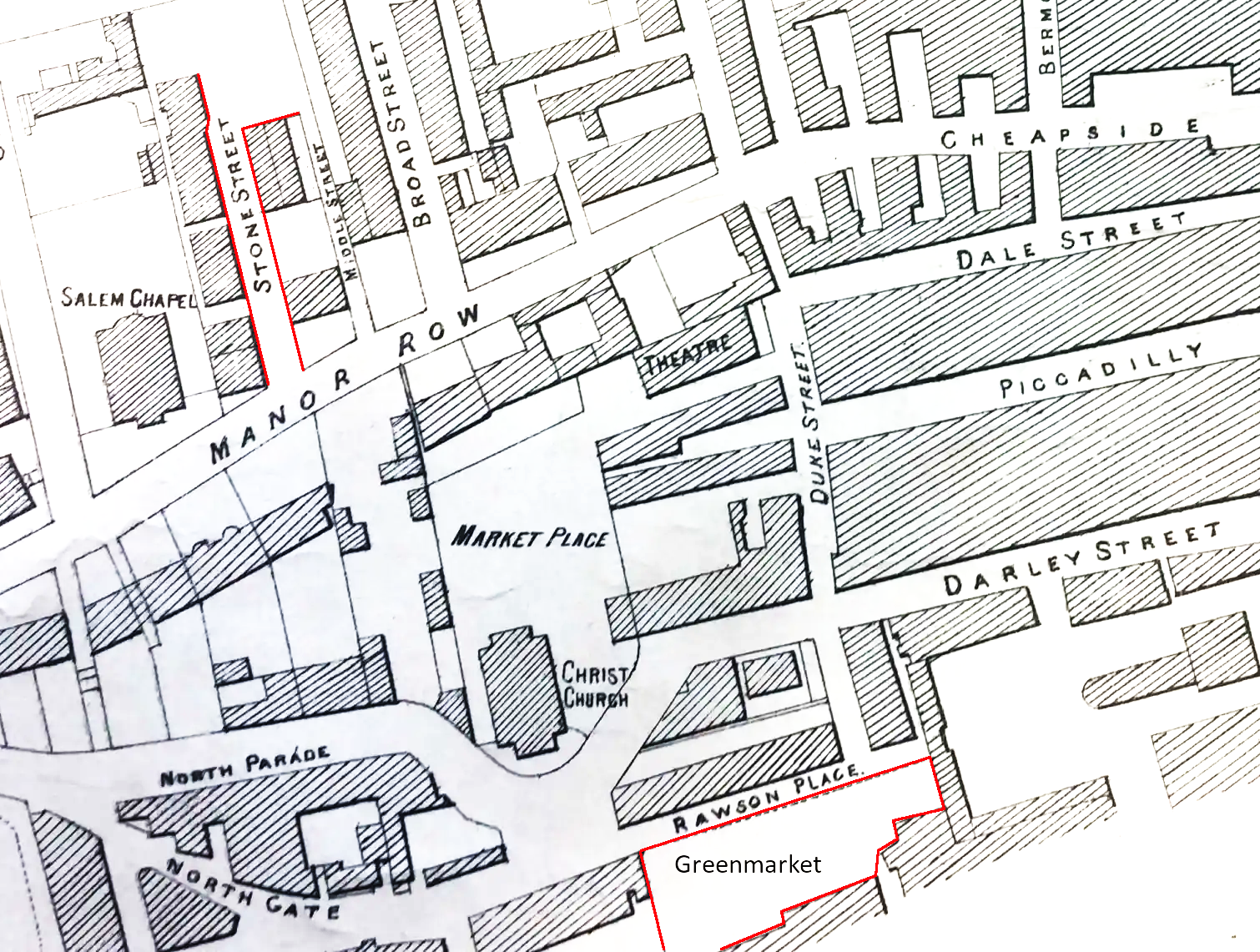
Map of part of Bradford, 1863, showing the locations of Stone Street and Greenmarket (Note: "Greenmarket" is given in some sources as "Greenmarket" and as "Green Market" in others.)

Arsenic trioxide—also known as white arsenic—is an industrially produced inorganic compound with the formula As_{2}O_{3}. It is white and is commonly found in either powdered or crystal form—the latter resembling sugar or sand. It is used as a wood preservative and a pesticide. As a solid it is tasteless, but when in solution, it is described as "very faint, at first sweetish, afterward very slightly metallic".

William Hardaker, known to locals as "Humbug Billy", sold sweets from a stall in the Greenmarket in central Bradford. Hardaker purchased his confectionery from Joseph Neal, who made the sweets in Stone Street a few hundred yards to the north. The sweets were peppermint lozenges, made by mixing peppermint oil into a base of sugar, water and gum, which was made into a paste, then dried on boards before being cut into lozenge shapes. As the sugar was relatively expensive, Neal would substitute some of the sugar with powdered gypsum; he later justified his actions by saying "where I use a pound of it, there are people who will use a ton of it".

== Outbreak ==
1858 Bradford sweets poisoning (West Yorkshire)

In the week before the regular Saturday market, Neal was due to make a batch of lozenges for Hardaker but had run out of "daft". Neal asked his lodger, James Archer, to visit a druggist in the town of Shipley, five miles (eight kilometres) by road, to purchase the gypsum. The druggist, Charles Hodgson, was ill in bed; his assistant, William Goddard, was on duty and had been told the daft was in a barrel in the attic. Goddard had only been working for Hodgson for a few weeks, hoping for an apprenticeship. When Archer asked for the daft, Goddard went to the attic and took twelve pounds (five kilograms) of powder from a cask. Goddard did not realise that there were two identical barrels and he had taken powder from a barrel of arsenic trioxide; the barrel was only labelled as such on the base.

Neal employed James Appleton—an experienced sweetmaker—to manufacture the lozenges. Both men thought the new batch of sweets was different from normal: Appleton thought the mixture was more free-flowing and smoother than normal, and both considered the end product was a darker shade than they were used to. Appleton, working closely with the arsenic, fell ill and suffered from fits of vomiting; Neal, who occasionally tasted the lozenges to check the quality, also began vomiting. Neither man connected their sickness to the lozenges.

When Hardaker collected the sweets from Neal on 30 October 1858 he also noted the different colour from the normal batches. He negotiated the lower price of 7 1/2d per pound for forty pounds (eighteen kilograms), a discount of 1/2d per pound on his usual price. (Note: 7½d in 1858 is approximately equivalent to £10 in 2025, according to calculations based on the Consumer Price Index measure of inflation.) Hardaker sold the sweets for two ounces (fifty-seven grams) for 1 1/2d. (Note: 1½d in 1858 is approximately equivalent to £1.61 in 2025, according to calculations based on the Consumer Price Index measure of inflation.) He ate some of the sweets and by 5:30 pm he became ill; he went home and left his assistant to look after the stall until it closed at 11:30 pm, by which point about a thousand sweets had been sold.

== Investigation, arrests and court case ==
On the Sunday morning the local police were informed of the deaths of several people; it was thought that the cause of the deaths was cholera. The misdiagnosis of cholera instead of arsenic poisoning was a common mistake, as the symptoms for both—vomiting, abdominal pain and diarrhoea—were similar and England was affected by an ongoing cholera pandemic. When more deaths were reported during the course of Sunday, Police Constable Campbell was sent to investigate; he made the connection between the sweets and the deaths, and visited Hardaker, seizing the remaining stock, which was just under thirty-six pounds (sixteen kilograms). Campbell then went to Neal's premises and seized six ounces (one hundred and seventy grams) of fragments of the sweets. A detective, William Burniston, went to Shipley with Archer to visit Hodgson, the druggist. When Archer indicated the cask from which the powder had been dispensed, Hodgson immediately identified it as containing arsenic. Burniston arrested Goddard, the assistant.

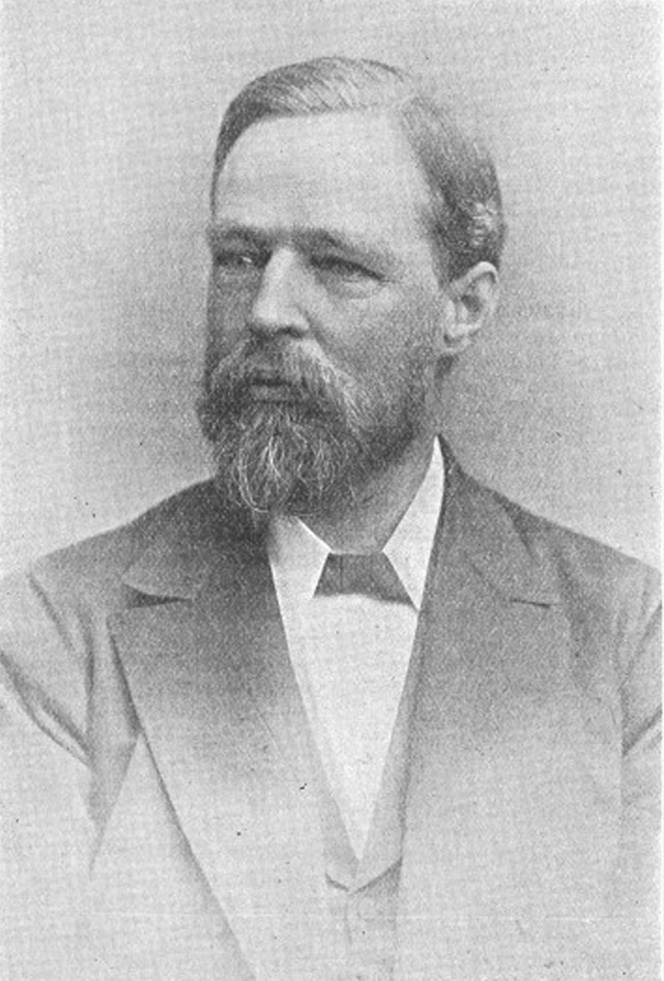
John Henry Bell, one of the local doctors who treated those poisoned

The chief constable, William Leveratt, had been kept abreast of developments, and deployed men to local inns and alehouses to spread warnings about the lozenges. He sent out bellmen to announce the warnings across the town and, at 11 pm, he had warning notices printed up and posted overnight for people to see in the morning. A local doctor, John Henry Bell, hypothesised the poisonings of his patients were caused by arsenic; he gave the lozenges from one patient to an analytical chemist, who confirmed his theory. Bell treated sixty patients for the poisoning.

By midday on the Monday—1 November—the number of dead had risen to twelve, with seventy-eight people seriously ill. Police visited Neal for a second time and searched his premises more thoroughly, finding hundreds of fragments still on the drying boards used when preparing the lozenges. Neal's wife also admitted that she had found other fragments and thrown them onto the fire; she had also been to their own sweetshop and brought back some bags of mixed sweets that contained lozenges or lozenge fragments. While the police were there, Neal ran off and was pursued; he was found sitting in his kitchen at home. Goddard was brought in front of the magistrates on the Monday; he was remanded in custody. An inquest was opened the following day. The magistrates also met and decided that Hodgson should also be arrested and remanded.

On Wednesday the magistrates also decided that Neal should also be arrested, although he was released on bail. They heard from an analytical chemist, Felix Rimmington, who estimated that each sweet contained nine grains (580 mg) of arsenic; he added that four and a half grains were sufficient to kill an adult male. Rimmington later made an analysis of the lozenges which showed each contained between eleven and sixteen grains (710 and 1,040 mg). By the end of Wednesday, fifteen people had been reported dead, eleven of whom were children; thirteen more were listed as "dangerously ill", and another hundred and fifty were ill but not in danger.

The magistrates met again on the Friday and determined that the three men in custody should be sent to the next York assizes for trial on a charge of manslaughter by negligence. Bail for Hodgson and Neal was set at £200; that for Goddard was set at £100. The number of dead had risen to seventeen, with 196 people ill. (Note: £200 in 1858 is approximately equivalent to £21,500; £100 in 1858 is approximately equivalent to £10,700 in 2025, according to calculations based on the Consumer Price Index measure of inflation.) Eventually up to twenty-one people died and over two hundred were sick; figures on the number of deaths vary, with either twenty or twenty-one people dead.

The assizes opened on 9 December 1858; the judge was Mr Baron Warren. In his opening remarks he said that there was no case for Neal to answer as he was not present when the arsenic was purchased or when the lozenges were made, and dismissed the case against him. Goddard, Warren said, was only following the instructions of his master and so also had no case to answer; his case was also dismissed. Warren said the case against Hodgson should stand and that he would be tried later in the month. Hodgson's trial opened on 21 December 1858 for the manslaughter of Elizabeth Mary Midgley, a seven-year-old girl. If he was found guilty of the charge, others would follow. After hearing some of the evidence, the judge stopped the proceedings and said there was no case for Hodgson to answer; he instructed the jury to record a verdict of not guilty, which they did.

== Legacy ==
The deaths led to calls for legislation to stop similar events occurring, and the Adulteration of Food or Drink Act 1860 was passed into law, "on a wave of public revulsion" against the event at Bradford, according to the microbiologist John Postgate. According to the legal scholar Jillian London, "Although the Bradford incident was far from solely responsible for the passage of the 1860 Act, it was instrumental in heightening public awareness of and outrage towards adulteration". The Act stated that penalties would be applied to:

Every person who shall sell any article of food or drink with which, to the knowledge of such person, any ingredient or material injurious to the health of persons eating or drinking such article has been mixed, and every person who shall sell as pure or unadulterated any article of food or drink which is adulterated or not pure ...

The political economist Sébastien Rioux observes that the law only applied when adulterated food was being passed off as pure, so the protection was only on misrepresenting what was being sold, rather than ensuring the purity of all food. The medical historian James C. Whorton considers the Act "was next to useless" as its provisions were too ambiguous and the penalties for breaching it—at £5—were too low to act as a deterrent. (Note: £5 in 1860 is approximately equivalent to £530 in 2025, according to calculations based on the Consumer Price Index measure of inflation.)

The events at Bradford were still felt ten years later when the Pharmacy Act 1868 was passed. Legislation on pharmacies was considered from 1859 onwards, although the Royal Pharmaceutical Society opposed a Poison Bill in 1859.

== See also ==
- 1900 English beer poisoning

== Notes and references ==
=== Sources ===
==== Books ====
- Berridge, Virginia (1999). Opium and the People: Opiate Use and Drug Control Policy in Nineteenth and Early Twentieth Century England. London: Free Association Books. ISBN 978-1-8534-3413-6.
- Cooper, Andre R. (1996). Cooper's Toxic Exposures Desk Reference. Boca Raton, Florida: CRC Press. ISBN 978-1-5667-0220-1.
- Cullen, William R.; Reimer, Kenneth J. (2017). Arsenic is Everywhere: Cause for Concern?. Cambridge: Royal Society of Chemistry. ISBN 978-1-7826-2314-4.
- Davis, Mark (2009). Bradford Through Time (Kindle ed.). Stroud: Amberley Publishing. ISBN 978-1-4456-0330-8.
- Emsley, John (2005). The Elements of Murder: A History of Poison. Oxford: Oxford University Press. doi:10.1093/oso/9780192805997.001.0001. ISBN 978-0-1928-0599-7.
- Foxcroft, Louise (2007). The Making of Addiction: The 'Use and Abuse' of Opium in Nineteenth-Century Britain. Farnham, Surrey: Ashgate. ISBN 978-0-7546-5633-3.
- Holloway, S. W. F. (1991). Royal Pharmaceutical Society of Great Britain, 1841–1991: A Political and Social History. London: The Pharmaceutical Press. ISBN 978-0-8536-9244-7.
- Holloway, S. W. F. (1995). "The Regulation of the Supply of Drugs in Britain Before 1868". In Porter, Roy; Teich, Mikuláš (eds.). Drugs and Narcotics in History. Cambridge: Cambridge University Press. pp. 77–96. doi:10.1017/CBO9780511599675.005. ISBN 978-0-5214-3163-7.
- Otter, Chris (2020). Diet for a Large Planet: Industrial Britain, Food Systems, and World Ecology. Chicago, Illinois: The University of Chicago Press. doi:10.7208/chicago/9780226705965.001.0001. ISBN 978-0-2267-0596-5.
- Postgate, John (2001). Lethal Lozenges and Tainted Tea: A Biography of John Postgate (1820-1881). Studley, Warwickshire: Brewin Books. ISBN 978-1-8585-8178-1.
- Sheeran, George (1992). The Bradford Poisoning of 1858. Halifax: Ryburn. ISBN 978-1-8533-1033-1.
- Tiekink, Edward R. T. (2010). "Anticancer Activity of Molecular Compounds of Arsenic, Antimony and Bismuth". In Sun, Hongzhe (ed.). Biological Chemistry of Arsenic, Antimony and Bismuth. Chichester, West Sussex: John Wiley & Sons. pp. 293–310. doi:10.1002/9780470975503.ch12. ISBN 978-0-4709-7622-7.
- Whorton, James C. (2010). The Arsenic Century: How Victorian Britain was Poisoned at Home, Work and Play. Oxford: Oxford University Press. ISBN 978-0-1995-7470-4.
- Wilson, Bee (2008). Swindled: The Dark History of Food Fraud, from Poisoned Candy to Counterfeit Coffee. Princeton, New Jersey: Princeton University Press. doi:10.1515/9780691214085. ISBN 978-0-6911-3820-6.
- Witthaus, Rudolph August (1919). Text-book of Chemistry, Inorganic and organic, with Toxicology. New York: William Wood & Co. OCLC 263036066.

==== Journals and magazines ====
- "Arsenic for the Million". The Lancet. 76 (1946): 592. December 1860. doi:10.1016/S0140-6736(02)57363-3.
- Bartrip, P. W. J. (1994). "How Green Was My Valance?: Environmental Arsenic Poisoning and the Victorian Domestic Ideal". The English Historical Review. 109 (433): 891–913. doi:10.1093/ehr/CXI.433.891. ISSN 0013-8266. JSTOR 574537.
- Cunningham, Harry (May 2016). "The Bradford Sweets Poisoning". History Today. 66 (5): 46–47.
- "John Henry Bell, MD, MRCS". British Medical Journal. 2 (2386): 735–236. 22 September 1906. doi:10.1136/bmj.2.2386.735.
- Jones, Ian F. (December 2000). "Arsenic and the Bradford Poisonings of 1858". The Pharmaceutical Journal. 265 (7128): 938–939. Archived from the original on 2 December 2020.
- London, Jillian (2014). "Tragedy, Transformation, and Triumph: Comparing the Factors and Forces That Led to the Adoption of the 1860 Adulteration Act in England and the 1906 Pure Food and Drug Act in the United States". Food and Drug Law Journal. 69 (2): 315–342. PMID 25163213.
- Monier-Williams, G. W. (December 1951). "Historical Aspects of the Pure Food Laws". British Journal of Nutrition. 5 (3): 363–367. doi:10.1079/BJN19510049. PMID 14895827.
- Rioux, Sébastien (January 2019). "Capitalist Food Production and the Rise of Legal Adulteration: Regulating Food Standards in 19th-Century Britain". Journal of Agrarian Change. 19 (1): 64–81. Bibcode:2019JAgrC..19...64R. doi:10.1111/joac.12265.
- "Wholesale Poisoning by Arsenic at Bradford". The Pharmaceutical Journal. 18 (6): 340–342. 1 December 1858.

==== News ====
- "Awful Calamity At Bradford". The Times. 4 November 1858. p. 5.
- "County Assizes". The Sheffield Daily Telegraph. 10 December 1858. p. 3.
- "The Bradford Poisonings". The Daily Telegraph. 23 December 1858. p. 3.
- "The Poisonings by Arsenic at Bradford". The Times. 6 November 1858. p. 12.
- Potts, Lauren (31 October 2023). "The Halloween Sweets That Poisoned Bradford". BBC News.
- "The Wholesale Poisoning At Bradford". The Times. 5 November 1858. p. 4.
- "Wholesale Poisoning at Bradford". The Times. 2 November 1858. p. 5.

==== Websites ====
- Clark, Gregory (2023). "The Annual RPI and Average Earnings for Britain, 1209 to Present (New Series)". MeasuringWorth.
- Price, James H. (2018). "Hassall, Arthur Hill (1817–1894)". Oxford Dictionary of National Biography (online ed.). Oxford University Press. doi:10.1093/ref:odnb/63790. (Subscription, Wikipedia Library access or UK public library membership required.)
