= Poisons Act 1972 =

Act of the Parliament of the United Kingdom

Poisons Act 1972 (Note: Section 14(1).)
- Act of Parliament
- Parliament of the United Kingdom
- Long title: An Act to consolidate certain enactments relating to poisons.
- Citation: 1972 c. 66
- Territorial extent: England and Wales; Scotland; (Note: Section 14(2).)

Dates
- Royal assent: 9 August 1972
- Commencement: 1 February 1978 (Note: Section 13(1). The Medicines Act 1968 (Commencement No. 7) Order 1977 (SI 1977/2128).) (Note: As to the commencement of this Act, see further Halsbury's Statutory Instruments, 1983, vol 13, pp 268 & 360; Halsbury's Statutes of England, 3rd Ed, 1985, Cumulative Supplement Part 1, para 1115; Halsbury's Laws of England, 4th Ed, vol 30, p 315; Northern Ireland Agriculture, p 132; Williams, Animal Feeding Stuffs Legislation of the UK, 1987, p 9.)

Other legislation
- Amends: See § Repealed enactments
- Repeals/revokes: See § Repealed enactments
- Amended by: Statute Law (Repeals) Act 1978; Dentists Act 1984; Control of Poisons and Explosives Precursors Regulations 2015 (SI 2015/966); European Qualifications (Health and Social Care Professions) Regulations 2007 (SI 2007/3101); Dental Qualifications (Recognition) Regulations 1996 (SI 1996/1496); Local Government etc. (Scotland) Act 1994 (c. 39); Criminal Procedure (Consequential Provisions) (Scotland) Act 1995 (c. 40); Pharmacists (Fitness to Practise) Act 1997 (c. 19)
- Relates to: Pharmacy and Poisons Act 1933; Pharmacy Act 1868

Status: Amended

Text of statute as originally enacted

Revised text of statute as amended

Text of the Poisons Act 1972 as in force today (including any amendments) within the United Kingdom, from legislation.gov.uk.

The Poisons Act 1972 (c. 66) is an act of the Parliament of the United Kingdom making provisions for the sale of non-medicinal poisons, and the involvement of local authorities and the Royal Pharmaceutical Society of Great Britain in their regulation.

The act refers to the Pharmacy and Poisons Act 1933, and the Poisons List. Non-medical poisons are divided into two separate lists. List one substances may only be sold by a registered pharmacist, and list two substances may be sold by a registered pharmacist or a licensed retailer.

Further provisions are made, to enable the Royal Pharmaceutical Society to enforce the compliance with the act by pharmacists, and impose fines for breaches.

Local authorities are responsible for vetting applications for list two substances, for law enforcement and control of licensed premises.

== Provisions ==
=== Section 7 ===
The Poison Rules 1982 (SI 1982/218) were made under this section.

=== Repealed enactments ===
Section 12(1) of the act repealed 7 enactments, listed in the schedule 2 to the act.

Citation	Short title	Extent of repeal
23 & 24 Geo. 5. c. 25	Pharmacy and Poisons Act 1933	Parts II and III. Schedule 2.
11 & 12 Geo. 6. c. 52	Veterinary Surgeons Act 1948	Section 23(a). In Schedule 2, paragraph 1.
2 & 3 Eliz. 2. c. 61	Pharmacy Act 1954	In Schedule 3, the amendments of sections 25 and 29 of the Pharmacy and Poisons Act 1933.
7 & 8 Eliz. 2. c. 72	Mental Health Act 1959	In Schedule 7, in Part II, the entries relating to the Pharmacy and Poisons Act 1933.
1963 c. 33	London Government Act 1963	Section 62(1)(c).
1968 c. 67	Medicines Act 1968	In Schedule 5, paragraphs 2 to 9.
1971 c. 23	Courts Act 1971	In Schedule 9, the entry relating to the Pharmacy and Poisons Act 1933.
