= Pharmacy Act 1954 =

Act of the Parliament of the United Kingdom

Pharmacy Act 1954 (Note: Section 26(1).)
- Act of Parliament
- Parliament of the United Kingdom
- Long title: An Act to consolidate certain enactments relating to pharmacy with corrections and improvements made under the Consolidation of Enactments (Procedure) Act 1949.
- Citation: 2 & 3 Eliz. 2. c. 61
- Territorial extent: England and Wales; Scotland; (Note: Section 26(2).)

Dates
- Royal assent: 25 November 1954
- Commencement: 25 December 1954 (Note: Section 26(1).)
- Repealed: 30 March 2007
Other legislation
Amends	See § Repealed enactments
Repeals/revokes	See § Repealed enactments
Amended by	Medicines Act 1968; Poisons Act 1972; Statute Law (Repeals) Act 1974; Magistrates’ Courts Act 1980; Forgery and Counterfeiting Act 1981; Criminal Justice Act 1982; Pharmaceutical Qualifications (EEC Recognition) Order 1987; Statute Law (Repeals) Act 1989; Statute Law (Repeals) Act 1993; Pharmaceutical Qualifications (Recognition) Regulations 1996; European Qualifications (Health Care Professions) Regulations 2003; Civil Partnership Act 2004; Health Act 2006; National Health Service (Consequential Provisions) Act 2006
Repealed by	Pharmacists and Pharmacy Technicians Order 2007

Status: Repealed

Text of statute as originally enacted

Revised text of statute as amended

The Pharmacy Act 1954 (2 & 3 Eliz. 2. c. 61) was an act of the Parliament of the United Kingdom that consolidated enactments related to pharmacy in Great Britain.

== Provisions ==
=== Repealed enactments ===
Section 25(2) of the act repealed 9 enactments, listed in the fourth schedule to the act.

Citation	Short title	Extent of repeal
15 & 16 Vict. c. 56	Pharmacy Act 1852	The whole act.
21 & 22 Vict. c. 97	Public Health Act 1858	The whole act.
31 & 32 Vict. c. 121	Pharmacy Act 1868	The whole act.
8 Edw. 7. c. 55	Poisons and Pharmacy Act 1908	The whole act.
19 & 20 Geo. 5. c. 31	Pharmacy Act 1929	The whole act.
23 & 24 Geo. 5. c. 25	Pharmacy and Poisons Act 1933	Sections one to seven; in subsection (2) of section nine the words from the beginning to "emblems and descriptions"; in subsection (1) of section fourteen the words "if he is a pharmacist, at his address in the register and"; in subsection (5) of section fourteen the words "the register or"; and the First Schedule.
4 & 5 Geo. 6. c. 42	Pharmacy and Medicines Act 1941	Subsections (1) to (5) of section four; and section six.
11 & 12 Geo. 6. c. 11	Medical Practitioners and Pharmacists Act 1947	Part II.
1 & 2 Eliz. 2. c. 19	Pharmacy Act 1953	The whole act.

== Subsequent developments ==
Section 25(2) of, and schedule 4 to, the act were repealed by section 1 of, and part XI of the schedule to, the Statute Law (Repeals) Act 1974, which came into force on 27 June 1974.

The whole act was repealed by article 67 of, and paragraph 1 of part 1 of schedule 1 to, the Pharmacists and Pharmacy Technicians Order 2007 (S.I. 2007/289), which came into force on 30 March 2007.
