= Pharmacy Act 1852 =

Act of the Parliament of the United Kingdom

Pharmacy Act 1852 (Note: The citation of this act by this short title was authorised by section 1 of, and the first schedule to, the Short Titles Act 1896. Due to the repeal of those provisions it is now authorised by section 19(2) of the Interpretation Act 1978.)
- Act of Parliament
- Parliament of the United Kingdom
- Long title: An Act for regulating the Qualifications of Pharmaceutical Chemists.
- Citation: 15 & 16 Vict. c. 56
- Territorial extent: United Kingdom

Dates
- Royal assent: 30 June 1852
- Commencement: 30 June 1852 (Note: The Acts of Parliament (Commencement) Act 1793.)
- Repealed: 25 December 1954
Other legislation
Amended by	Pharmacy Act 1868; Statute Law Revision Act 1875; Perjury Act 1911; False Oaths (Scotland) Act 1933; Pharmacy and Poisons Act 1933; Statute Law Revision Act 1950
Repealed by	Pharmacy Act 1954

Status: Repealed

Text of statute as originally enacted

The Pharmacy Act 1852 (15 & 16 Vict. c. 56) was an act of the Parliament of the United Kingdom which was the first legislation in the United Kingdom to regulate pharmacists and druggists.

It set up a register of pharmacists and limited the use of the title to people registered with the Pharmaceutical Society, but proposals to give the society exclusive rights to sell drugs or poisons were rejected. It did not provide a legal definition for the trade and practice of pharmacy.

== Subsequent developments ==
Section 6 of the act was repealed by section 1(1) of, and the first schedule to, the Statute Law Revision Act 1950 (14 Geo. 6. c. 6), which came into force on 23 May 1950.

The whole act was repealed by section 25(2) of, and the fourth schedule to, the Pharmacy Act 1954 (2 & 3 Eliz. 2. c. 61), which came into force on 25 December 1954.
