= Medicines Act 1968 =

Act of the Parliament of the United Kingdom

Medicines Act 1968 (Note: Section 136(1))
- Act of Parliament
- Parliament of the United Kingdom
- Long title: An Act to make new provision with respect to medicinal products and related matters, and for purposes connected therewith.
- Citation: 1968 c. 67
- Territorial extent: United Kingdom (Note: Section 136(2))

Dates
- Royal assent: 25 October 1968
- Commencement: various (Note: Section 136(3)–(4))
Other legislation
Amends	See § Repealed enactments
Repeals/revokes	See § Repealed enactments
Amended by	Misuse of Drugs Act 1971; Medicines (Retail Pharmacists—Exemptions from Licensing Requirements) Order 1971; Poisons Act 1972; House of Commons Disqualification Act 1975; Northern Ireland Assembly Disqualification Act 1975; National Health Service Act 1977; National Health Service (Scotland) Act 1978; Animal Health Act 1981; Animal Health and Welfare Act 1984; Food Safety Act 1990; Medicines Act 1968 (Amendment) (No. 2) Regulations 1992; Medicinal Products: Prescription by Nurses etc. Act 1992; Statute Law (Repeals) Act 1993; Adults with Incapacity (Scotland) Act 2000; Health and Social Care Act 2001; Regulation of Care (Scotland) Act 2001; Statute Law (Repeals) Act 2004; Mental Capacity Act 2005; Medicines (Advisory Bodies) Regulations 2005; Health Act 2006; National Health Service (Consequential Provisions) Act 2006; Veterinary Medicines Regulations 2006; Pharmacists and Pharmacy Technicians Order 2007; European Qualifications (Pharmacy) Regulations (Northern Ireland) 2008; Pharmacy Order 2010; Medicines Act 1968 (Pharmacy) Order 2011; Public Services Reform (Scotland) Act 2010 (Consequential Modifications of Enactments) Order 2011; Human Medicines Regulations 2012; Children and Social Work Act 2017; Pharmacy (Preparation and Dispensing Errors – Registered Pharmacies) Order 2018; European Qualifications (Health and Social Care Professions) (Amendment etc.) (EU Exit) Regulations 2019; Pharmacy (Responsible Pharmacists, Superintendent Pharmacists etc.) Order 2022; Pharmacy (Preparation and Dispensing Errors – Hospital and Other Pharmacy Services) Order 2022; Human Medicines (Amendments Relating to Hub and Spoke Dispensing etc.) Regulations 2025

Status: Amended

Text of statute as originally enacted

Revised text of statute as amended

Text of the Medicines Act 1968 as in force today (including any amendments) within the United Kingdom, from legislation.gov.uk.

The Medicines Act 1968 (c. 67) is an act of the Parliament of the United Kingdom. Its official long title is "An Act to make new provision with respect to medicinal products and related matters, and for purposes connected therewith." It governs the control of medicines for human use and for veterinary use, which includes the manufacture and supply of medicines, and the manufacture and supply of (medicated) animal feeding stuffs.

The act defines three categories of medicine: prescription only medicines (POM), which are available only from a pharmacist if prescribed by an appropriate practitioner (including, but not limited to doctors, dentists, optometrists, prescribing pharmacists and nurses); pharmacy medicines (P), available only from a pharmacist but without a prescription; and general sales list (GSL) medicines which may be bought from any shop without a prescription.

The act controls supply of the drugs it covers, but does not define any offence of simple possession. Possession of a prescription only drug without a prescription is only an offence if the drug is also controlled under the Misuse of Drugs Act 1971 and possession is thus specified as an offence. Therefore, for example, possession of a prescription only antibiotic without a prescription is not an offence.

For description of the legal classification of medicines in the UK see the Royal Pharmaceutical Society web site, and the publication Medicines Ethics and Practice.

The act was introduced following problems with the off-label use of thalidomide.

The act established the forerunner to the current Commission on Human Medicines.

== Provisions ==
=== Repealed enactments ===
Section 135(2) of the act repealed 14 enactments, listed in the schedule 6 to the act.

Citation	Short title	Extent of repeal
7 & 8 Geo. 5. c. 21	Venereal Disease Act 1917	Section 2(2), except the proviso.
23 & 24 Geo. 5. c. 25	Pharmacy and Poisons Act 1933	Sections 8 to 14. In section 17, in subsection (2), the words 'of persons who are to be entitled to sell poisons in Part II', and, in subsection (6), the words from 'and in this Act' to the end of the subsection. In section 18(2)(a)(ii) the word "registered". Section 19. In section 23, in subsection (1), paragraph (a), paragraph (b)(ii) and paragraph (i); and in subsection (3), in the reference to paragraphs (a), (b)(i), (c), (d), (e) and (i), the references to paragraphs (a) and (i). In section 25, in subsection (1) the words 'Part I of this Act and of section nineteen and', in subsection (4) those words and the word 'registered', and subsection (9). In section 29, the definitions of 'authorised seller of poisons' and 'poison' and paragraph (a) of the definition of 'registered'.
2 & 3 Geo. 6. c. 13	Cancer Act 1939	In section 4, subsection (1)(b), subsection (3) and subsection (4)(a)(vii).
4 & 5 Geo. 6. c. 42	Pharmacy and Medicines Act 1941	The whole act.
11 & 12 Geo. 6. c. 37	Radioactive Substances Act 1948	Sections 3 and 4. In section 12, the definition of 'authorised seller of poisons'.
14 Geo. 6. c. 36	Diseases of Animals Act 1950	Part II and Schedule 3.
2 & 3 Eliz. 2. c. 61	Pharmacy Act 1954	Section 19.
4 & 5 Eliz. 2. c. 16	Food and Drugs Act 1955	In section 1, subsection (2) and subsection (3)(b). In section 2(3), the words from "except" to "drugs". Section 3(2). In section 6(6), the words from "except" to "drugs". In section 91(2), the words from "but" to the end of the subsection. In section 109(3)(a), the words from "so" to the end of the paragraph. In section 114(4), the words from 'the authority concerned' to 'in any other case'. The words "or drug" and "drug" wherever they occur, except in section 135. In Schedule 8, in column 2, in the first paragraph, the words from "other" to "drug". In Part I of Schedule 9, in column 2, paragraph (a)(iii) of the definition relating to sections 321 to 325 of the Public Health Act 1936.
4 & 5 Eliz. 2. c. 25	Therapeutic Substances Act 1956	The whole act.
4 & 5 Eliz. 2. c. 30	Food and Drugs (Scotland) Act 1956	In section 1, subsection (2) and subsection (3)(b). In section 2(3) the words from "except" to "drugs". Section 3(2). In section 6(6) the words from "except" to "drugs". In section 28(2) the words from "but" to the end of the subsection. The words "or drug" and "drug" wherever they occur, except in section 58.
4 & 5 Eliz. 2. c. 76	Medical Act 1956	Section 47. Section 57(9) and (10).
1963 c. 9	Purchase Tax Act 1963	In Part II of Schedule 1, in paragraph 5(2), the definition of 'authorised seller of poisons'.
1964 c. 64	Drugs (Prevention of Misuse) Act 1964	In section 1, in subsection (7), the reference to, and the paragraph substituted for, paragraph (k) of subsection (2). In section 9 the definition of 'authorised seller of poisons'.
1965 c. 15	Dangerous Drugs Act 1965	In section 11, in subsection (4) the words 'in subsection (1) thereof'.

Section 135(4) of the act repealed 8 enactments, listed in schedule 8 to the act.

Citation	Short title	Extent of repeal
15 & 16 Geo. 5. c. 8 (N.I.)	Pharmacy and Poisons Act (Northern Ireland) 1925	Section 17. Section 18. Schedule 3.
1945 c. 9 (N.I.)	Medicines, Pharmacy and Poisons Act (Northern Ireland) 1945	Part I. In section 14, in subsection (1) the words "if he is a registered person" and the words from "and, if he is a representative" onwards; and in subsection (2) the proviso. Sections 15 to 18. In section 19, in subsection (1) the words "or to be an authorised seller of poisons" and the words from ", or if the owner is a body corporate" to "employee of the body corporate,"; in subsection (2) in paragraph (a) the words from "or, if the owner" onwards and in paragraph (b) the words from "or, if the owner is a body corporate" to "employee of the body corporate,"; and subsection (3). In section 27(1)(a)(iii) the words from "in accordance" onwards. Section 28. In section 32, in subsection (1) paragraphs (a), (b)(ii) and (i), and in subsection (3) the references to paragraphs (a) and (i) of subsection (1). In section 35(3) the words "section four, section five or". In section 36(2) and (3) the words "I and". Section 37. In section 38(1) the definitions of "authorised seller of poisons", "poison", "premises having an annual licence" and "retailing". In Schedule 2 in the proviso to paragraph (1) the word "or" at the end of paragraph (a) and paragraphs (b) and (c).
1955 c. 31 (N.I.)	Pharmacy and Poisons Act (Northern Ireland) 1955	Section 2. Section 14.
1958 c. 13 (N.I.)	Diseases of Animals Act (Northern Ireland) 1958	Part II. In Schedule 4, Part I.
1958 c. 27 (N.I.)	Food and Drugs Act (Northern Ireland) 1958	In section 1 subsection (2), subsection (3)(b) and in subsection (6) the words "or drug". In section 2 in subsection (1) the words "or drug" in both places where they occur, and in subsection (3) the words ", except so far as it relates to drugs,". Section 3(2). In section 6 in subsection (1) the words "or drug" in each of the three places where they occur, in subsection (2) those words in each of the two places where they occur, in subsection (5) those words and in subsection (6) the words ", except so far as it relates to drugs,". In section 33 in subsection (2) the words "or drug" and subsection (3). In section 34 in subsection (1) the word ", drug" and in subsection (2) the words "or drug". In section 35 in subsections (1) and (4) the word ", drug". In section 38 the word ", drug" in both places where it occurs. In section 44 in subsection (2)(a) the word ", drug" in both places where it occurs and in subsection (3) that word in both places where it occurs. In section 47, in subsection (1) the words "so far as those sections or regulations relate to food", and in subsection (3)(a) the words "so far as it relates to food".
1966 c. 23 (N.I.)	Diseases of Animals (Amendment) Act (Northern Ireland) 1966	Section 3(2).
1967 c. 12 (N.I.)	Pharmacy Act (Northern Ireland) 1967	Section 5. In Schedule 1 the entries amending sections 17 and 27 of the Pharmacy and Poisons Act (Northern Ireland) 1925 and the entries amending the proviso to section 14(2) and sections 15, 16, 17 and 18 of, and paragraph 1 of Schedule 2 to, the Medicines, Pharmacy and Poisons Act (Northern Ireland) 1945.
1967 c. 29 (N.I.)	Increase of Fines Act (Northern Ireland) 1967	In the Schedule the entries relating to sections 15(4) and 16(1A) of the Medicines, Pharmacy and Poisons Act (Northern Ireland) 1945 and section 32 of the Diseases of Animals Act (Northern Ireland) 1958.
