= Jonathan Toogood =

English surgeon (1784–1870)

Jonathan Toogood (1784-1870) MRCS 1804, FRCS 1843, LRCP 1844 was a surgeon from the south west of England who founded the Bridgwater Infirmary in Somerset in 1813. He held strong views on many issues of the time, including the role of coroners, the Poor Law Amendment Act 1834, Homeopathy and regulations regarding the sale of arsenic.

== Family and education ==
The Toogood family was well known in the town of Sherborne in Dorset. Jonathan's grandfather John Toogood, a merchant, was for many years a governor at Sherborne School and at one time resided at Sherborne House, Dorset. Jonathan's father, the Rev. John Toogood, was given a living at All Saints Church, Kington Magna in Dorset and it was there that Jonathan was born in 1784. Rev. Toogood was an ardent campaigner against the Atlantic Slave Trade.

In 1798 at the age of 14 Jonathan became apprenticed to Mr Hill Dawe, a surgeon-apothecary in the town of Bridgwater in Somerset and after a five-year apprenticeship continued his surgical training as a pupil of Mr John Abernethy (surgeon) at St Bartholomew's Hospital in London.

In 1806 Jonathan returned to Bridgwater to set up in practice in this busy port, well known for its ship building industry and its brick and tile trade. Later that year he married Ann Giles from the nearby village of Mark, Somerset. Together they had 12 children - of the eight surviving sons, three entered the medical profession. His eldest son, Rev. Jonathan James Toogood became the vicar of North Petherton, just south of Bridgwater, but in later life moved to Kirkby Overblow then in the West Riding of Yorkshire.

== Work and associations ==
The work of a 19th-century surgeon in rural Somerset could be very difficult and challenging. Jonathan believed that an Infirmary would be a great asset for the town of Bridgwater and the surrounding agricultural villages. In 1813 he "invited his medical brethren" and other notable persons in the town to help establish such an institution. By October of the same year a small 'Dispensary' opened its doors in Back Street (now Clare Street) in Bridgwater. This was based on the Voluntary hospital system, which had started in many large towns in the 18th century and depended on donations and benefactors. Despite the inevitable ups and downs the establishment continued to prosper, moving to larger premises in the town on the banks of the River Parrett in 1820. Here it flourished as a Voluntary Hospital until 1948, when it was taken over by the state. In 2014, some 200 years later, the hospital moved to new modern premises on the outskirts of the town.

Jonathan worked at the Infirmary until 1845 but continued in the role of Consulting Surgeon and Physician after his retirement. He also founded and funded the Eye Dispensary in the town in 1834, assisted by one of his sons John Giles Toogood.

Jonathan corresponded with many well known medical personalities of that era – for example, the surgeons Henry Cline and Sir Astley Cooper in London and James Young Simpson, Professor of Midwifery in Edinburgh. He also visited and walked the wards in Paris with the leading French surgeons. He embraced new ideas such as the use of the stethoscope, which had arrived in England in the 1820s, invented by Rene Laennec in Paris; and he employed anaesthesia in the form of ether and chloroform to relieve pain in surgery, unlike many practitioners at that time who frowned upon its use. Jonathan wrote many articles for the leading medical journals and was very critical of the new Poor Law Amendment Act 1834. He called for higher qualifications and tighter regulations for coroners. He also campaigned for changes in the sale of arsenic, petitioning Parliament, and in 1850 was a member of the Arsenic Committee. Its work resulted in the Arsenic Act 1851. Finally he was very critical of homeopathy, which had become popular in the early 19th century, writing a scathing article about the practice in 1848. This resulted in a rebuff in the British Journal of Homeopathy entitled 'Medical Toogoodism and Homeopathy'. In 1843 Jonathan became a Fellow of the Royal College of Surgeons of England, one of the first 300 Fellows.

== Final years ==
Jonathan Toogood spent his retirement in [Torquay] where his son Isaac Baruch Toogood was a General Practitioner. He was often seen visiting patients with his son. He died of 'old age' on 7 December 1870, aged 86.

== Publications by Jonathan Toogood ==
-Hints to Mothers and other persons interested in the management of females at the age of puberty (1845)

-Illustrations of the Fraud and Folly of Homeopathy (1848)

-Reminiscences of a Medical Life (1853)
