= Auctioneers Act 1845 =

Act of the Parliament of the United Kingdom

Auctioneers Act 1845 (Note: The citation of this act by this short title was authorised by section 1 of, and the first schedule to, the Short Titles Act 1896. Due to the repeal of those provisions it is now authorised by section 19(2) of the Interpretation Act 1978.)
- Act of Parliament
- Parliament of the United Kingdom
- Long title: An Act to impose a new duty on the licence to be taken out by all auctioneers in the United Kingdom.
- Citation: 8 & 9 Vict. c. 15
- Territorial extent: United Kingdom

Dates
- Royal assent: 8 May 1845
- Commencement: 8 May 1845 (Note: Section 1.)
Other legislation
Amends	Excise Act 1803; Excise Act 1805; Excise Licences Act 1825
Repeals/revokes	Auction Duties (Ireland) Act 1814; Auction Duties Act 1815
Amended by	Statute Law Revision Act 1875; Statute Law Revision Act 1891; Statute Law Revision Act 1948; Auctions (Bidding Agreements) Act 1927; Pharmacy and Medicines Act 1941; Finance Act 1949
Relates to	Justices of the Peace Small Debt (Scotland) Act 1825; Civil Bill Courts (Ireland) Act 1836; Small Debt (Scotland) Act 1837; Small Debts' Recovery (Ireland) Act 1837; Suitors in Chancery Relief Act 1852

Status: Partially repealed

Text of statute as originally enacted

Revised text of statute as amended

Text of the Auctioneers Act 1845 as in force today (including any amendments) within the United Kingdom, from legislation.gov.uk.

The Auctioneers Act 1845 (8 & 9 Vict. c. 15) is an act of the Parliament of the United Kingdom, passed during the reign of Queen Victoria on 8 August 1845.

The initial act instituted a tax on licenses for auctioneers to raise capital. This was repealed, however, by the Finance Act 1949 (12, 13 & 14 Geo. 6. c. 47).

Only one section of the act remains in British law – section 7, which states that auctioneers must place a board with their full name and residence that is "publicly visible and legible" in the room where the auction takes place before, during and after the auction. This was to allow people to make formal complaints against auctioneers in cases of fraud or other offenses. This section was expanded by the Auctions (Bidding Agreements) Act 1927 (17 & 18 Geo. 5. c. 12), to impose a penalty of £20 upon any auctioneer who failed to follow the act.

7. Auctioneer, before sale shall suspend or affix a ticket or board containing his full christian and surname and place of residence.

Every auctioneer, before beginning any auction, shall affix or suspend, or cause to be affixed or suspended, a ticket or board, containing his true and full christian and surname and residence painted, printed, or written in large letters publicly visible and legible, in some conspicuous part of the room or place where the auction is held, so that all persons may easily read the same, and shall also keep such ticket or board so affixed or suspended during the whole time of such auction being held; and if any auctioneer begins any auction, or acts as auctioneer at any auction, in any room or place where his name and residence is not so painted or written on a ticket or board so affixed or suspended, and kept affixed or suspended as aforesaid, he shall forfeit for every such offence the sum of twenty pounds.
