= Arsenic Act 1851 =

Act of the Parliament of the United Kingdom

Arsenic Act 1851 (Note: The citation of this act by this short title was authorised by section 1 of, and the first schedule to, the Short Titles Act 1896. Due to the repeal of those provisions it is now authorised by section 19(2) of the Interpretation Act 1978.)
- Act of Parliament
- Parliament of the United Kingdom
- Long title: An Act to regulate the Sale of Arsenic.
- Citation: 14 & 15 Vict. c. 13
- Territorial extent: United Kingdom

Dates
- Royal assent: 5 June 1851
- Commencement: 5 June 1851 (Note: The Acts of Parliament (Commencement) Act 1793.)
- Repealed: England and Wales and Scotland: 1 May 1936 (Note: The Pharmacy and Poisons Act 1933 (Date of Commencement) Order 1935.); Northern Ireland: 1 July 1945 (Note: The Medicines, Pharmacy and Poisons (Appointed Days) Order (Northern Ireland) 1945 (SR&O 1945/64).)
Other legislation
Repealed by	England and Wales and Scotland: Pharmacy and Poisons Act 1933; Northern Ireland: Medicines, Pharmacy and Poisons Act (Northern Ireland) 1945
Relates to	Pharmacy Act 1868

Status: Repealed

Text of statute as originally enacted

The Arsenic Act 1851 or the Sale of Arsenic Regulation Act 1851 (14 & 15 Vict. c. 13) was an act of the Parliament of the United Kingdom, passed in 1851, during the reign of Queen Victoria. Arsenic was at the time widely used as a pigment and in agricultural products such as sheep dressings; the act was introduced to address increasing public concern over accidental and deliberate arsenic poisonings.

The act put requirements on recording the sales of arsenic, and required that (unless used in medicinal or agricultural contexts), arsenic was to be dyed with indigo or soot.

The act did not restrict who was allowed to sell arsenic, as until the Pharmacy Act 1868 (31 & 32 Vict. c. 121) there was no legal definition of a pharmacist.

== Background ==
Arsenic was widely used as an ingredient in many household products throughout the Victorian Era, for example in medicines, candles, soft furnishings and colourants. The substance and its derivatives are now infamously known as a poison, but up until the 1940s arsenic was also known as a potent medicine. Paracelsus noted that the distinction between a drug and a poison was in the dosage.

Arsenic was also used as a food adulterant in the continually industrialising 19th century. For example, it would be added as a cheaper red colourant to food and wine. It was used in taxidermy alongside plaster of Paris to preserve against decay and moths. It was also used to stain corks to give it the impression of having been stored for much longer, or to clean wine bottles. It was also used to clarify wine, as it was cheaper than the desired substance for doing so, isinglass, a collagen derived from the swim bladders of sturgeon. Arsenic even gave white wine an oil-like gloss, which the wine-coopers who managed wine merchants' barrels referred to as putting "a face upon it". Green pigments derived from arsenic were also common as colourants in sweets, for example Paris green and Scheele's green, which were found to be highly toxic. Cases of children falling ill due to such colourants are attested to at least the 1840s.

The widespread use of arsenic in this era caused many livestock to be poisoned due to atmospheric deposits on grazing land, and many arsenic factories exhaled large amounts of dangerous arsenic fumes.

Prior to the Arsenic Act, arsenic compounds were mostly stored as simple white powders, usually completely odourless and tasteless in solid form. Thus, they were easily confusable with many other substances used commonly in food, industry and furnishing. This is one of the main reasons cited for causing the Bradford sweets poisoning of 1858, whereby arsenic trioxide was confused with plaster of Paris, used to bulk out confectionery.

== Contents ==
The definition of arsenic for the purposes of the act included "Arsenious Acid and the Arsenites, Arsenic Acid and the Arseniates, and all other colourless poisonous Preparations of Arsenic".

The act required those selling such products to maintain a written and signed record of those to whom they had sold arsenic, including the quantity and its stated purpose. Both the buyer and the seller would have to sign the record, and if the buyer was unknown to the seller, a third party witness was required to be present at the sale. The act ruled that arsenic could only be sold to adults.

It also required that unless the arsenic was to be used for a purpose that would make such treatment unsuitable, for example in medical or agricultural applications, it had to be coloured with either soot or indigo to clearly distinguish it from other white powders.

The maximum penalty for breaching the terms of the act, or providing false information, was £20, equivalent to about £13,000 as of 2014. (Note: Comparing relative average earnings of £20 in 1851 with 2014.)

== Subsequent developments ==
The act did little to reduce the usage of arsenic in the everyday. As an article in the Lancet remarked,

How to convict of arsenical poisoning when ladies use arsenical cosmetics; when confectioners sell arsenical sweetmeats; when paperhangers clothe our walls with arsenical hangings, and impregnate all the air with fine arsenical dust; above all, when chemists sell arsenic for a toothpowder and label it mercury?

Section 17 of the Pharmacy Act 1868 provided that "nothing in this Act contained shall repeal or affect any of the provisions" of the Arsenic Act 1851.

The whole act was repealed for England and Wales and Scotland by section 31(3) of, and the third schedule to, the Pharmacy and Poisons Act 1933 (23 & 24 Geo. 5. c. 25), which came into force on 1 May 1936.

The whole act was repealed for the Republic of Ireland by the Poisons Act, 1961.

== See also ==
- 1858 Bradford sweets poisoning
- Adulteration of Food and Drink Act 1860

== Bibliography ==
- Arnold, Thomas James. "Arsenic". Summary of the Duties of a Justice of the Peace Out of Sessions: Summary Convictions. Henry Sweet. V and R Stevens and G S Norton. William Maxwell. London. 1860. Pages 31 to 33.
- Bell, Suzanne (2003), Encyclopedia of Forensic Science, Facts on File, ISBN 978-0-8160-4811-3
- Crellin, John; Worthen, Dennis B. (2004), A Social History of Medicines in the Twentieth Century, Informa Healthcare, ISBN 978-0-7890-1845-8
- Foxcroft, Louise (2006), The Making of Addiction: The 'Use and Abuse' of Opium in Nineteenth-Century Britain, Ashgate Publishing, ISBN 978-0-7546-5633-3
- Glyn-Jones, Hugh N. (1933), The Pharmacy and Poisons Act Explained, Eyre & Spottiswoode
- "The Arsenic Act, 1851". Halsbury's Statutes of England. (The Complete Statutes of England). First Edition. Butterworth & Co (Publishers) Ltd. Bell Yard, Temple Bar, London. 1930. Volume 11. Page 662.
- Lely, John Mounteney. "The Arsenic Act, 1851". The Statutes of Practical Utility. (Chitty's Statutes). Fifth Edition. Sweet and Maxwell. Stevens and Sons. London. 1895. Volume 9. Title "Poison". Pages 1 and 2.
