= Pharmacy and Medicines Act 1941 =

Act of the Parliament of the United Kingdom

Pharmacy and Medicines Act 1941 (Note: Section 19(1).)
- Act of Parliament
- Parliament of the United Kingdom
- Long title: An Act to amend the Pharmacy and Poisons Act, 1933, to prohibit certain advertisements relating to medical matters, and to amend the law relating to medicines.
- Citation: 4 & 5 Geo. 6. c. 42
- Territorial extent: England and Wales; Scotland; (Note: Section 19(2).)

Dates
- Royal assent: 7 August 1941
- Commencement: 7 August 1941 (Note: The Acts of Parliament (Commencement) Act 1793.) (in part); 2 September 1941 (section 12) (Note: Section 12(6).); 2 September 1941 (section 14) (Note: Section 14.); 1 July 1942 (section 11) (Note: Section 11(4).)
- Repealed: 1 February 1978 (Note: The Medicines Act 1968 (Commencement No. 7) Order 1977 (SI 1977/2128).)
Other legislation
Amends	Pharmacy and Poisons Act 1933; See § Repealed enactments
Repeals/revokes	See § Repealed enactments
Repealed by	Medicines Act 1968

Status: Repealed

Text of statute as originally enacted

The Pharmacy and Medicines Act 1941 (4 & 5 Geo. 6. c. 42) was an act of the Parliament of the United Kingdom that amended the Pharmacy and Poisons Act 1933 (23 & 24 Geo. 5. c. 25), restricted the advertisement of medicines for certain diseases and for procuring abortion, required disclosure of the composition of proprietary medicines, and repealed the duties formerly charged on medicine stamps.

== Provisions ==
=== Repealed enactments ===
Section 14 of the act repealed 12 enactments, listed in the schedule to the act.

Citation	Short title	Extent of repeal
42 Geo. 3. c. 56	Medicines Stamp Act 1802	The whole act.
43 Geo. 3. c. 73	Medicines Stamp Act 1803	The whole act.
44 Geo. 3. c. 98	Stamp Act 1804	The whole act.
52 Geo. 3. c. 150	Medicines Stamp Act 1812	The whole act.
55 Geo. 3. c. 184	Stamp Act 1815	Section fifty-four.
8 & 9 Vict. c. 15	Auctioneers Act 1845	In section six, the words "or patent medicines".
27 & 28 Vict. c. 56	Revenue (No. 2) Act 1864	In section six, the words from "Owners" to "stamp duty".
38 & 39 Vict. c. 23	Customs and Inland Revenue Act 1875	Section eight.
54 & 55 Vict. c. 38	Stamp Duties Management Act 1891	In proviso (c) to section nine and in section twenty-six, the words "medicines or", wherever they occur.
8 Edw. 7. c. 16	Finance Act 1908	In subsection (4) of section four, the words "medicines and".
5 & 6 Geo. 5. c. 89	Finance (No. 2) Act 1915	Section eleven.
17 & 18 Geo. 5. c. 10	Finance Act 1927	Section two.

== Subsequent developments ==
The whole act was repealed by section 135(2) of, and schedule 6 to, the Medicines Act 1968, which came into operation on 1 February 1978.
