= John Henry Bell =

British physician (1832–1906)

John Henry Bell MD, MRCS
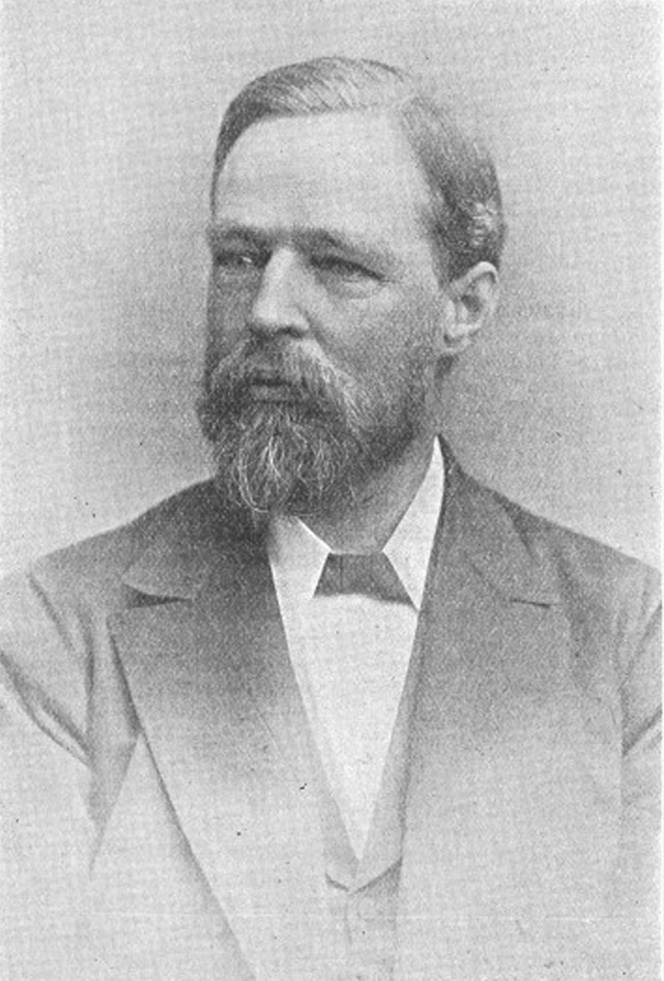
- Born: 1832; Bradford, England
- Died: 9 September 1906 (aged 74); Morecambe, England
- Resting place: Undercliffe Cemetery, Bradford
- Occupation: Medical doctor
- Spouse: Miss Holgate (m. 1860)
- Children: 5

John Henry Bell MRCS (1832 – 9 September 1906) was a British medical doctor and researcher who is best known for contributing to the study of anthrax.

== Early life and education ==
John Henry Bell was born in Bradford, in the northern wool-manufacturing region of England, in 1832 to Scottish parents. After leaving school aged 14, he studied medicine with a local doctor on a six-year apprenticeship. He attended Leeds Medical School, where he worked as an assistant to one of the lecturers. He completed his exams after only two years of study instead of the usual three years, passing with distinction.

== Career ==
In 1857, Bell became a member of the Royal College of Surgeons of England. He was also elected to the Hey Society, and served as its president. While he was in Leeds, he became one of the first people to describe miners' nystagmus. After his time in Leeds, Bell returned to Bradford to establish his medical practice, and became one of the founders of the Royal Eye and Ear Hospital, where he worked for 40 years.

In 1878, Bell was involved in a post-mortem investigation of three woolsorters who had died of "blood poisoning". Bell believed that the deaths could not have been caused by any fibres, dust or hair from the wool they worked with, as woolsorters did not experience more frequent coughs than other groups, and also inhalation of such materials does not lead to sudden death. Instead, Bell believed that the deaths were caused by a "septic poison" from the decaying animal wool. A friend who had recently visited European bacteriological laboratories introduced him to the idea that the "woolsorters' disease" was caused by an infection from the animal, which Robert Koch had discovered in 1877 to be anthrax bacillus. Bell subsequently inoculated animals with blood from a person who had died of woolsorters' disease. All the animals died from infection and Bell showed that all of the dead animals had anthrax bacillus in their blood.

Following this discovery, Bell recommended that deaths from woolsorters' disease could be reduced if fresh air were blown through the wool for 24 hours before it was sorted. However, many disputed the best way to disinfect wool, with manufacturers coming into conflict with workers, who advocated different methods. In 1880, a woolsorter named Samuel Firth died from anthrax infection; Bell stated on the death certificate that Firth's death was due to his employer's negligence over protecting him from infected wool. This led to an inquest, with the result being a set of voluntary guidelines being issued to protect workers from infected wool. These guidelines were expanded in 1884, and made official policy in 1899 by the Home Office.

== Personal life ==
John Henry Bell married a Miss Holgate in 1860, with whom he had five children. He died on 9 September 1906 in Morecambe at the age of 74. He is buried in Undercliffe Cemetery, Undercliffe Lane, Bradford.
