= Pharmacy Act 1868 =

Act of the Parliament of the United Kingdom

Pharmacy Act 1868 (Note: Section 28.)
- Act of Parliament
- Parliament of the United Kingdom
- Long title: An Act to regulate the Sale of Poisons, and alter and amend the Pharmacy Act 1852.
- Citation: 31 & 32 Vict. c. 121
- Territorial extent: England and Wales; Scotland; (Note: Section 27.)

Dates
- Royal assent: 31 July 1868
- Commencement: 31 December 1868 (Note: Section 1.)
- Repealed: 25 December 1954
Other legislation
Amends	Pharmacy Act 1852
Amended by	Sale of Food and Drugs Act 1875; Perjury Act 1911; Dangerous Drugs and Poisons (Amendment) Act 1923; False Oaths (Scotland) Act 1933
Repealed by	Pharmacy Act 1954
Relates to	Pharmacy Act 1868

Status: Repealed

Text of statute as originally enacted

The Pharmacy Act 1868 (31 & 32 Vict. c. 121) was an act of the Parliament of the United Kingdom. It was the major 19th-century legislation in the United Kingdom limiting the sale of poisons and dangerous drugs to qualified pharmacists and druggists.

== Background ==
During the 1850s and 1860s there were moves to establish the medical and pharmaceutical professions as separate, self-regulating bodies. The Pharmaceutical Society had been established in 1841 and by the 1850s had 2,500 members out of a total of 25,000 drug sellers. The Pharmacy Act 1852 (15 & 16 Vict. c. 56) set up a register of pharmacists and limited the use of the title to people registered with the society, but proposals to give it exclusive rights were rejected. After the society opposed two Poison Bills in 1857 and 1859 that did not meet its criteria, a rival United Society of Chemists and Druggists was established in 1860 by pharmacists disgruntled with the lack of progress, and in 1863 the newly established General Medical Council unsuccessfully attempted to assert control over drug distribution.

Eventually a compromise was reached between the two competing pharmaceutical societies, from which emerged the 1868 act.

== Scope ==
The act established a system of registration involving major and minor examinations controlled by the Pharmaceutical Society. It also controlled the distribution of fifteen named poisons in a two-part schedule. All poisons had to be entered in a Poison Register. Those in the first part, which included strychnine, potassium cyanide and ergot, could only be sold if the purchaser was known to the seller or to an intermediary known to both. All drugs had to be sold in containers with the seller's name and address. Arsenic had already been controlled by the Arsenic Act 1851 (14 & 15 Vict. c. 13).

Drugs in the second schedule included opium and all preparations of opium or of poppies. There was opposition from many chemists, who claimed the various forms of opium such as laudanum constituted a major part of their trade, so that early drafts omitted it entirely; it was only reintroduced later in the parliamentary process.

== Effect ==
There was an immediate fall in the death rate caused by opium from 6.4 per million population in 1868 to 4.5 in 1869. After a decade it had risen to over 5 and by the end of the century it was back at the 1868 level. Deaths among children under five dropped from 20.5 per million population between 1863 and 1867, to 12.7 per million in 1871, and further declined to between 6 and 7 per million in the 1880s.

Despite this, over the counter sales were still allowed. It was not until the Dangerous Drugs Act 1920 (10 & 11 Geo. 5. c. 46), that opium and its derivatives were prohibited and therefore required a prescription. Drugs with a 2% or less of opium content (0.2 percent morphine or 0.1 percent heroin) were exempt from the 1920 Act.

In contrast with legislation regulating other industries at the time, the Pharmacy Act neglected to restrict the profession to men only. As a result, 223 women were listed on the first compulsory register of pharmacists in 1869. Most were the wives, widows or daughters of male pharmacists and were already practicing in 1868. Alice Vickery became the first woman to qualify as a pharmacist under the new act in 1873.

== Subsequent developments ==
Section 3 of the act was repealed by section 1 of the Sale of Food and Drugs Act 1875 (38 & 39 Vict. c. 63), which came into force on 1 October 1875.

The whole act was repealed by section 25(2) of, and the fourth schedule to, the Pharmacy Act 1954 (2 & 3 Eliz. 2. c. 61), which came into force on 25 December 1954.

== Bibliography ==
- Lely, John Mountenay. The Statutes of Practical Utility. (Chitty's Statutes). Fifth Edition. Sweet and Maxwell. Stevens and Sons. London. 1895. Volume 9. Title "Poison". Pages 4 to 8.
