= Therapeutic Substances Act 1956 =

Act of the Parliament of the United Kingdom

Therapeutic Substances Act 1956 (Note: Section 19(1).)
- Act of Parliament
- Parliament of the United Kingdom
- Long title: An Act to consolidate the Therapeutic Substances Act, 1925, and the Therapeutic Substances (Prevention of Misuse) Acts, 1947 to 1953.
- Citation: 4 & 5 Eliz. 2. c. 25
- Territorial extent: United Kingdom

Dates
- Royal assent: 15 March 1956
- Commencement: 15 April 1956 (Note: Section 19(2).)
- Repealed: 5 November 1993
Other legislation
Amends	See § Repealed enactments
Repeals/revokes	See § Repealed enactments
Amended by	Northern Ireland Act 1962; Medicines Act 1968; Secretary of State for Social Services Order 1968; Transfer of Functions (Wales) Order 1969; Northern Ireland Constitution Act 1973; Biological Standards Act 1975; Transfer of Functions (Health and Social Security) Order 1988
Repealed by	Statute Law (Repeals) Act 1993

Status: Repealed

Text of statute as originally enacted

Revised text of statute as amended

The Therapeutic Substances Act 1956 (Note: Section 19(1).) (4 & 5 Eliz. 2. c. 25) was an act of the Parliament of the United Kingdom that consolidated enactments relating to therapeutic substances in the United Kingdom.

== Provisions ==
=== Repealed enactments ===
Section 18(1) of the act repealed 5 enactments, listed in the second schedule to the act.

Citation	Short title	Extent of repeal
15 & 16 Geo. 5. c. 60	Therapeutic Substances Act 1925	The whole act.
10 & 11 Geo. 6. c. 29	Penicillin Act 1947	The whole act.
11 & 12 Geo. 6. c. 52	Veterinary Surgeons Act, 1948	In section twenty-three, the words "and (e) section one of the Penicillin Act, 1947".
11 & 12 Geo. 6. c. 52	Veterinary Surgeons Act, 1948	In the Second Schedule, paragraph 5.
14 & 15 Geo. 6. c. 13	Penicillin (Merchant Ships) Act 1951	The whole act.
1 & 2 Eliz. 2. c. 32	Therapeutic Substances (Prevention of Misuse) Act 1953	The whole act.

== Subsequent developments ==
The whole act was repealed by section 1(1) of, and part XII of schedule 1 to, the Statute Law (Repeals) Act 1993, which came into force on 5 November 1993.
