= Law Reform (Personal Injuries) (Amendment) Act 1953 =

Act of the Parliament of the United Kingdom

Law Reform (Personal Injuries) (Amendment) Act 1953 (Note: Section 2(1).)
- Act of Parliament
- Parliament of the United Kingdom
- Long title: An Act to amend section two of the Law Reform (Personal Injuries) Act, 1948, in relation to the assessment in Scotland of damages for death.
- Citation: 1 & 2 Eliz. 2. c. 7
- Introduced by: Richard Brooman-White (Commons); Lord Morrison (Lords)
- Territorial extent: United Kingdom

Dates
- Royal assent: 12 February 1953
- Commencement: 12 February 1953 (Note: The Acts of Parliament (Commencement) Act 1793.)
- Repealed: 13 May 1976
Other legislation
Amends	Law Reform (Personal Injuries) Act 1948
Repealed by	Damages (Scotland) Act 1976

Status: Repealed

Text of statute as originally enacted

The Law Reform (Personal Injuries) (Amendment) Act 1953 (1 & 2 Eliz. 2. c. 7) was an act of the Parliament of the United Kingdom that amended the Law Reform (Personal Injuries) Act 1948 (11 & 12 Geo. 6. c. 41) so that, in an action for damages in Scotland in respect of a person's death, any right to benefit resulting from that death was not taken into account in assessing the damages.

== Provisions ==
Section 1 of the act inserted a new subsection (5A) after subsection (5) of section 2 of the Law Reform (Personal Injuries) Act 1948 (11 & 12 Geo. 6. c. 41), which related to the measure of damages for personal injury or death. The new subsection provided that, in an action for damages in Scotland in respect of a person's death, there was not to be taken into account, in assessing those damages, any right to benefit resulting from that person's death.

Section 2(2) of the act provided that subsection (5A) applied whether the cause of action accrued, or the action was commenced, before or after the commencement of the act.

== Subsequent developments ==
The whole act was repealed by section 11 of, and schedule 2 to, the Damages (Scotland) Act 1976, which came into force on 13 May 1976. Schedule 2 of the 1976 act also repealed section 2(5A) of the Law Reform (Personal Injuries) Act 1948 (11 & 12 Geo. 6. c. 41), the subsection inserted by this act.
