= List of acts of the Parliament of the United Kingdom from 1953 =

This is a complete list of acts of the Parliament of the United Kingdom for the year 1953.

Note that the first parliament of the United Kingdom was held in 1801; parliaments between 1707 and 1800 were either parliaments of Great Britain or of Ireland. For acts passed up until 1707, see the list of acts of the Parliament of England and the list of acts of the Parliament of Scotland. For acts passed from 1707 to 1800, see the list of acts of the Parliament of Great Britain. See also the list of acts of the Parliament of Ireland.

For acts of the devolved parliaments and assemblies in the United Kingdom, see the list of acts of the Scottish Parliament, the list of acts of the Northern Ireland Assembly, and the list of acts and measures of Senedd Cymru; see also the list of acts of the Parliament of Northern Ireland.

The number shown after each act's title is its chapter number. Acts passed before 1963 are cited using this number, preceded by the year(s) of the reign during which the relevant parliamentary session was held; thus the Union with Ireland Act 1800 is cited as "39 & 40 Geo. 3 c. 67", meaning the 67th act passed during the session that started in the 39th year of the reign of George III and which finished in the 40th year of that reign. Note that the modern convention is to use Arabic numerals in citations (thus "41 Geo. 3" rather than "41 Geo. III"). Acts of the last session of the Parliament of Great Britain and the first session of the Parliament of the United Kingdom are both cited as "41 Geo. 3". Acts passed from 1963 onwards are simply cited by calendar year and chapter number.

== 1 & 2 Eliz. 2 ==
Continuing the second session of the 40th Parliament of the United Kingdom, which met from 4 November 1952 until 29 October 1953.

=== Public general acts ===
Short title	Citation	Royal assent
Long title
Consolidated Fund Act 1953 (repealed)	1 & 2 Eliz. 2. c. 6	12 February 1953
An Act to apply a sum out of the Consolidated Fund to the service of the year ending on the thirty-first day of March, one thousand nine hundred and fifty-three. (Repealed by Statute Law Revision Act 1964 (c. 79))
Law Reform (Personal Injuries) (Amendment) Act 1953 (repealed)	1 & 2 Eliz. 2. c. 7	12 February 1953
An Act to amend section two of the Law Reform (Personal Injuries) Act, 1948, (Note: Law Reform (Personal Injuries) Act 1948 (11 & 12 Geo. 6. c. 41)) in relation to the assessment in Scotland of damages for death. (Repealed by Damages (Scotland) Act 1976 (c. 13))
Consolidated Fund (No. 2) Act 1953 (repealed)	1 & 2 Eliz. 2. c. 8	26 March 1953
An Act to apply certain sums out of the Consolidated Fund to the service of the years ending on the thirty-first day of March, one thousand nine hundred and fifty-two, one thousand nine hundred and fifty-three and one thousand nine hundred and fifty-four. (Repealed by Statute Law Revision Act 1964 (c. 79))
Royal Titles Act 1953	1 & 2 Eliz. 2. c. 9	26 March 1953
An Act to provide for an alteration of the Royal Style and Titles.
Agricultural Land (Removal of Surface Soil) Act 1953	1 & 2 Eliz. 2. c. 10	6 May 1953
An Act to make it an offence to remove surface soil from land in certain circumstances; and for purposes connected therewith.
Harbours, Piers and Ferries (Scotland) Act 1953 (repealed)	1 & 2 Eliz. 2. c. 11	6 May 1953
An Act to extend the power of the Secretary of State under section seven of the Harbours, Piers and Ferries (Scotland) Act, 1937, (Note: Harbours, Piers and Ferries (Scotland) Act 1937 (1 Edw. 8 & 1 Geo. 6. c. 28)) to authorise the undertaking by certain local and harbour authorities of operations in connection with marine works. (Repealed by Transport Act 1968 (c. 73))
Leasehold Property Act and Long Leases (Scotland) Act Extension Act 1953 (repealed)	1 & 2 Eliz. 2. c. 12	6 May 1953
An Act to extend for a further period the operation of the Leasehold Property (Temporary Provisions) Act, 1951, (Note: Leasehold Property (Temporary Provisions) Act 1951 (14 & 15 Geo. 6. c. 38)) and the Long Leases (Temporary Provisions) (Scotland) Act, 1951. (Note: Long Leases (Temporary Provisions) (Scotland) Act 1951 (14 & 15 Geo. 6. c. 28)) (Repealed by Statute Law (Repeals) Act 1975 (c. 10))
Transport Act 1953 (repealed)	1 & 2 Eliz. 2. c. 13	6 May 1953
An Act to require the British Transport Commission to dispose of the property held by them for the purposes of the part of their undertaking which is carried on through the Road Haulage Executive; to amend the law relating to the carriage of goods by road and to provide for a levy, for the benefit of the said Commission and for other purposes, on motor vehicles used on roads; to provide for the reorganisation of the railways operated by the said Commission and to amend the law relating to the powers, duties and composition of the said Commission; to repeal certain provisions of the Transport Act, 1947, (Note: Transport Act 1947 (10 & 11 Geo. 6. c. 49)) and to amend other provisions thereof; to amend section six of the Cheap Trains Act, 1883; and for purposes connected with the matters aforesaid. (Repealed by Transport Act 1962 (10 & 11 Eliz. 2. c. 46) and Statute Law (Repeals) Act 1978 (c. 45))
Prevention of Crime Act 1953	1 & 2 Eliz. 2. c. 14	6 May 1953
An Act to prohibit the carrying of offensive weapons in public places without lawful authority or reasonable excuse.
Iron and Steel Act 1953 (repealed)	1 & 2 Eliz. 2. c. 15	14 May 1953
An Act to repeal the Iron and Steel Act, 1949, (Note: Iron and Steel Act 1949 (12, 13 & 14 Geo. 6. c. 72)) and to dissolve the Iron and Steel Corporation of Great Britain; to establish an Iron and Steel Board for the supervision of the iron and steel industry and to define the functions of that Board, and to make other provision as to the said industry; to provide for the return of iron and steel undertakings to private ownership and for the disposal of the property, rights, liabilities and obligations of the said Corporation; and for purposes connected with the matters aforesaid. (Repealed by House of Commons Disqualification Act 1957 (5 & 6 Eliz. 2. c. 20), Tribunals and Inquiries Act 1958 (6 & 7 Eliz. 2. c. 66), Statute Law Revision Act 1963 (c. 30), Iron and Steel Act 1967 (c. 17), National Loans Act 1968 (c. 13), European Communities Act 1972 (c. 68), Statute Law (Repeals) Act 1974 (c. 22) and Iron and Steel Act 1975 (c. 64))
Town and Country Planning Act 1953 (repealed)	1 & 2 Eliz. 2. c. 16	20 May 1953
An Act to abolish development charges under the Town and Country Planning Act, 1947, (Note: Town and Country Planning Act 1947 (10 & 11 Geo. 6. c. 51)) and the Town and Country Planning (Scotland) Act, 1947, (Note: Town and Country Planning (Scotland) Act 1947 (10 & 11 Geo. 6. c. 53)) subject to certain savings and special provisions; to provide, subject to certain savings and special provisions, that the payments required by sections fifty-eight and fifty-five of those Acts respectively shall not be made and to make certain provision as to claims for and rights to receive such payments; to make provision as to the acquisition of land by the Central Land Board under sections forty-three and forty of those Acts respectively; to revoke Regulation 6 of the Town and Country Planning (Modification of Mines Act) Regulations, 1948, (Note: Town and Country Planning (Modification of Mines Act) Regulations 1948 (SI 1948/1522)) and Regulation 5 of the Town and Country Planning (Modification of Mines Act) (Scotland) Regulations, 1948; (Note: Town and Country Planning (Modification of Mines Act) (Scotland) Regulations 1948 (SI 1948/1526)) to suspend the operation of section thirty of the Mineral Workings Act, 1951; (Note: Mineral Workings Act 1951 (14 & 15 Geo. 6. c. 60)) and for purposes connected with the matters aforesaid. (Repealed for England and Wales by Town and Country Planning Act 1962 (10 & 11 Eliz. 2. c. 38) and for Scotland by Town and Country Planning (Scotland) Act 1972 (c. 52))
White Fish and Herring Industries Act 1953 (repealed)	1 & 2 Eliz. 2. c. 17	20 May 1953
An Act to provide for the payment out of moneys provided by Parliament of grants in respect of the acquisition of new vessels and engines for use in the white fish and herring industries, and of a subsidy in respect of white fish; to extend the power to make loans out of such moneys to the White Fish Authority and the Herring Industry Board, and the power to make grants out of such moneys to that Board for the promotion of the sale of herring and other purposes; and otherwise to amend the enactments relating to the said industries. (Repealed by Sea Fish Industry Act 1970 (c. 11))
Coastal Flooding (Emergency Provisions) Act 1953 (repealed)	1 & 2 Eliz. 2. c. 18	20 May 1953
An Act to make provision for work for defence against sea water in localities affected by the flood of January, 1953, (Note: North Sea flood of 1953.) to provide for the rehabilitation of agricultural land damaged by salt water, and for purposes connected with the matters aforesaid. (Repealed by Statute Law (Repeals) Act 1977 (c. 18))
Pharmacy Act 1953 (repealed)	1 & 2 Eliz. 2. c. 19	20 May 1953
An Act to amend the law relating to pharmacy and for purposes consequential on such amendment. (Repealed by Pharmacy Act 1954 (2 & 3 Eliz. 2. c. 61))
Births and Deaths Registration Act 1953	1 & 2 Eliz. 2. c. 20	14 July 1953
An Act to consolidate certain enactments relating to the registration of births and deaths in England and Wales with corrections and improvements made under the Consolidation of Enactments (Procedure) Act, 1949. (Note: Consolidation of Enactments (Procedure) Act 1949 (12, 13 & 14 Geo. 6. c. 33))
Road Transport Lighting Act 1953 (repealed)	1 & 2 Eliz. 2. c. 21	14 July 1953
An Act to amend the law in relation to the rear lighting of road vehicles; and for purposes connected therewith. (Repealed by Road Transport Lighting Act 1957 (5 & 6 Eliz. 2. c. 51))
Road Transport Lighting (No. 2) Act 1953 (repealed)	1 & 2 Eliz. 2. c. 22	14 July 1953
An Act to amend the Road Transport Lighting Acts, 1927 (Note: Road Transport Lighting Act 1927 (17 & 18 Geo. 5. c. 37)) and 1945; (Note: Road Transport Lighting (Cycles) Act 1945 (8 & 9 Geo. 6. c. 8)) and for purposes incidental thereto. (Repealed by Road Transport Lighting Act 1957 (5 & 6 Eliz. 2. c. 51))
Accommodation Agencies Act 1953	1 & 2 Eliz. 2. c. 23	14 July 1953
An Act to prohibit the taking of certain commissions in dealings with persons seeking houses or flats to let and the unauthorised advertisement for letting of houses and flats.
Navy and Marines (Wills) Act 1953	1 & 2 Eliz. 2. c. 24	14 July 1953
An Act to amend the law with respect to the operation of wills made by members of the naval and marine forces; and for purposes connected therewith.
Local Government Superannuation Act 1953 (repealed)	1 & 2 Eliz. 2. c. 25	14 July 1953
An Act to amend the law as to the benefits to be payable to or in respect of contributors to superannuation funds maintained by local authorities and as to the persons entitled to participate in the benefits of those funds; to amend the Local Government Superannuation Act, 1937, (Note: Local Government Superannuation Act 1937 (1 Edw. 8 & 1 Geo. 6. c. 68)) and the Local Government Superannuation (Scotland) Act, 1937; (Note: Local Government Superannuation (Scotland) Act 1937 (1 Edw. 8 & 1 Geo. 6. c. 69)) to provide alternative benefits to those provided under section nine of the Local Government (Clerks) Act, 1931; (Note: Local Government (Clerks) Act 1931 (21 & 22 Geo. 5. c. 45)) to make provision as to payments due from local authorities to deceased employees; and for purposes connected therewith. (Repealed by Superannuation Act 1972 (c. 11) and Local Government Act 1972 (c. 70))
Local Government (Miscellaneous Provisions) Act 1953	1 & 2 Eliz. 2. c. 26	14 July 1953
An Act to amend the law relating to local authorities.
Slaughter of Animals (Pigs) Act 1953 (repealed)	1 & 2 Eliz. 2. c. 27	14 July 1953
An Act to provide for the humane slaughter of pigs in places other than slaughterhouses and knackers' yards; and for purposes connected therewith. (Repealed for England and Wales by Slaughter of Animals Act 1958 (7 & 8 Eliz. 2. c. 8) and for Scotland by Slaughter of Animals (Scotland) Act 1980 (c. 13))
Dogs (Protection of Livestock) Act 1953	1 & 2 Eliz. 2. c. 28	14 July 1953
An Act to provide for the punishment of persons whose dogs worry livestock on agricultural land; and for purposes connected with the matter aforesaid.
National Insurance Act 1953 (repealed)	1 & 2 Eliz. 2. c. 29	14 July 1953
An Act to amend the National Insurance Acts, 1946 to 1952, in relation to maternity benefit and persons entitled thereto; and for purposes connected with the matter aforesaid. (Repealed by Statute Law Revision (Consequential Repeals) Act 1965 (c. 55))
Rhodesia and Nyasaland Federation Act 1953 (repealed)	1 & 2 Eliz. 2. c. 30	14 July 1953
An Act to provide for the federation of Southern Rhodesia, Northern Rhodesia and Nyasaland; and for purposes connected therewith. (Repealed by Statute Law (Repeals) Act 1976 (c. 16))
Army and Air Force (Annual) Act 1953 (repealed)	1 & 2 Eliz. 2. c. 31	14 July 1953
An Act to provide, during twelve months, for the discipline and regulation of the Army and the Air Force. (Repealed by Revision of the Army and Air Force Acts (Transitional Provisions) Act 1955 (3 & 4 Eliz. 2. c. 20))
Therapeutic Substances (Prevention of Misuse) Act 1953 (repealed)	1 & 2 Eliz. 2. c. 32	14 July 1953
An Act to make further provision as to the substances other than penicillin to which the Penicillin Act, 1947, (Note: Penicillin Act 1947 (10 & 11 Geo. 6. c. 29)) may be applied by regulations and to provide for relaxing in certain cases the restrictions imposed by that Act. (Repealed by Therapeutic Substances Act 1956 (4 & 5 Eliz. 2. c. 25))
Education (Miscellaneous Provisions) Act 1953 (repealed)	1 & 2 Eliz. 2. c. 33	14 July 1953
An Act to amend the law relating to education in England and Wales; and to make further provision with respect to the duties of education authorities in Scotland as to dental treatment. (Repealed by Education Act 1996 (c. 56))
Finance Act 1953	1 & 2 Eliz. 2. c. 34	31 July 1953
An Act to grant certain duties, to alter other duties and to amend the law relating to the National Debt and the Public Revenue, and to make further provision in connection with Finance.
Appropriation Act 1953 (repealed)	1 & 2 Eliz. 2. c. 35	31 July 1953
An Act to apply a sum out of the Consolidated Fund to the service of the year ending on the thirty-first day of March, one thousand nine hundred and fifty-four; and to appropriate the supplies granted in this Session of Parliament. (Repealed by Statute Law Revision Act 1964 (c. 79))
Post Office Act 1953 (repealed)	1 & 2 Eliz. 2. c. 36	31 July 1953
An Act to consolidate certain enactments relating to the Post Office with corrections and improvements made under the Consolidation of Enactments (Procedure) Act, 1949. (Repealed by Postal Services Act 2000 (c. 26))
Registration Service Act 1953	1 & 2 Eliz. 2. c. 37	31 July 1953
An Act to consolidate certain enactments relating to the registration service in England and Wales with corrections and improvements made under the Consolidation of Enactments (Procedure) Act, 1949.
New Towns Act 1953 (repealed)	1 & 2 Eliz. 2. c. 38	31 July 1953
An Act to increase the amount of the advances which may be made to development corporations under section twelve of the New Towns Act, 1946. (Note: New Towns Act 1946 (9 & 10 Geo. 6. c. 68)) (Repealed by New Towns Act 1955 (3 & 4 Eliz. 2. c. 4))
Marshall Aid Commemoration Act 1953	1 & 2 Eliz. 2. c. 39	31 July 1953
An Act to make provision for the granting of scholarships in commemoration of the assistance received by the United Kingdom under the European Recovery Programme and known as Marshall Aid; and for purposes connected with the matter aforesaid.
University of St. Andrews Act 1953 (repealed)	1 & 2 Eliz. 2. c. 40	31 July 1953
An Act to make provision for the re-organisation of University education in St. Andrews and Dundee, to amend the constitution of the University of St. Andrews, of University College, Dundee, and of other bodies or institutions concerned, and for purposes connected with the matters aforesaid. (Repealed by Universities (Scotland) Act 1966 (c. 13))
Hospital Endowments (Scotland) Act 1953 (repealed)	1 & 2 Eliz. 2. c. 41	31 July 1953
An Act to provide for the constitution of a Scottish Hospital Endowments Research Trust; to empower the Hospital Endowments Commission to transfer endowments to the said Trust; to amend the provisions of the National Health Service (Scotland) Act, 1947, (Note: National Health Service (Scotland) Act 1947 (10 & 11 Geo. 6. c. 27)) relating to the said Commission; and for purposes connected with the matters aforesaid. (Repealed by National Health Service (Scotland) Act 1978 (c. 29))
Valuation for Rating Act 1953 (repealed)	1 & 2 Eliz. 2. c. 42	31 July 1953
An Act to make new provision as respects the gross value for rating purposes of dwelling-houses, private garages and private storage premises, and of certain hereditaments partly used as private dwellings; and for purposes connected with the matter aforesaid. (Repealed by General Rate Act 1967 (c. 9))
National Insurance (Industrial Injuries) Act 1953 (repealed)	1 & 2 Eliz. 2. c. 43	31 July 1953
An Act to make further provision with respect to the system of insurance established by the National Insurance (Industrial Injuries) Act, 1946, (Note: National Insurance (Industrial Injuries) Act 1946 (9 & 10 Geo. 6. c. 62)) and to extend the class of persons to whom certain benefits may be paid under section eighty-two of that Act and the benefits under that Act which may be so paid. (Repealed by Statute Law Revision (Consequential Repeals) Act 1965 (c. 55))
Isle of Man (Customs) Act 1953 (repealed)	1 & 2 Eliz. 2. c. 44	31 July 1953
An Act to amend the law with respect to customs in the Isle of Man. (Repealed for the Isle of Man by Customs and Excise etc. Order 1976 (GC No 1/76))
School Crossing Patrols Act 1953 (repealed)	1 & 2 Eliz. 2. c. 45	31 July 1953
An Act to provide for the authorisation of measures for the control of traffic, at places where children cross roads on their way to or from school, by persons other than police constables. (Repealed by Road Traffic Act 1960 (8 & 9 Eliz. 2. c. 16))
Licensing Act 1953 (repealed)	1 & 2 Eliz. 2. c. 46	31 July 1953
An Act to consolidate certain enactments relating to justices' licences for the sale by retail of intoxicating liquor and to the registration of clubs and to matters connected therewith with corrections and improvements made under the Consolidation of Enactments (Procedure) Act, 1949. (Repealed by Weights and Measures Act 1963 (c. 31) and Licensing Act 1964 (c. 26))
Emergency Laws (Miscellaneous Provisions) Act 1953	1 & 2 Eliz. 2. c. 47	31 July 1953
An Act to make permanent provision with respect to certain matters with respect to which temporary provision has hitherto been made by or under Defence Regulations; to suspend the operation of subsection (1) of section thirty-one of the Road Traffic Act, 1934; (Note: Road Traffic Act 1934 (24 & 25 Geo. 5. c. 50)) to remove certain limitations on the exercise of the powers conferred on the court by virtue of the Settled Land and Trustee Acts (Court's General Powers) Act, 1943; (Note: Settled Land and Trustee Acts (Court's General Powers) Act 1943 (6 & 7 Geo. 6. c. 25)) to empower certain persons subject to the Naval Discipline Act (Note: Naval Discipline Act 1866 (29 & 30 Vict. c. 109)) to take affidavits and declarations outside the United Kingdom; to save the previous operation of Regulation fifty-five of the Defence (General) Regulations, 1939, after the revocation or expiry thereof; and for purposes connected with the matters aforesaid.
Merchandise Marks Act 1953 (repealed)	1 & 2 Eliz. 2. c. 48	31 July 1953
An Act to amend the provisions of the Merchandise Marks Acts, 1887 to 1938, relating to false trade descriptions, and to imported goods bearing the trade mark of a manufacturer, dealer or trader in the United Kingdom, and to amend the Merchandise Marks Act, 1887, (Note: Merchandise Marks Act 1887 (50 & 51 Vict. c. 28)) in relation to offences. (Repealed by Trade Descriptions Act 1968 (c. 29))
Historic Buildings and Ancient Monuments Act 1953	1 & 2 Eliz. 2. c. 49	31 July 1953
An Act to provide for the preservation and acquisition of buildings of outstanding historic or architectural interest and their contents and related property, and to amend the law relating to ancient monuments and other objects of archaeological interest.
Auxiliary Forces Act 1953 (repealed)	1 & 2 Eliz. 2. c. 50	29 October 1953
An Act to consolidate certain enactments and Orders in Council relating to the Territorial Army and the Royal Auxiliary Air Force with corrections and improvements made under the Consolidation of Enactments (Procedure) Act, 1949. (Repealed by Revision of the Army and Air Force Acts (Transitional Provisions) Act 1955 (3 & 4 Eliz. 2. c. 20), Mental Health (Scotland) Act 1960 (8 & 9 Eliz. 2. c. 61), Northern Ireland Act 1962 (10 & 11 Eliz. 2. c. 30), Defence (Transfer of Functions) (No. 1) Order 1964 (SI 1964/488), Theft Act 1968 (c. 60), Armed Forces Act 1971 (c. 33), Criminal Justice Act 1972 (c. 71), Local Government (Scotland) Act 1973 (c. 65), Statute Law (Repeals) Act 1974 (c. 22), Statute Law (Repeals) Act 1976 (c. 16), Statute Law (Repeals) Act 1977 (c. 18) and Reserve Forces Act 1980 (c. 9))
Monopolies and Restrictive Practices Commission Act 1953 or the Monopolies and Restrictive Practices Act 1953 (repealed)	1 & 2 Eliz. 2. c. 51	29 October 1953
An Act to make provision for a chairman and deputy chairmen of the Monopolies and Restrictive Practices Commission, and for the tenure of office and superannuation benefits of the chairman and deputy chairmen thereof; to enable functions of the Commission to be exercised by groups of its members; and for purposes connected with the matters aforesaid. (Repealed by Monopolies and Mergers Act 1965 (c. 50))
Enemy Property Act 1953	1 & 2 Eliz. 2. c. 52	29 October 1953
An Act to make provision as respects things done, in relation to enemy property or property treated as enemy property, in excess of the powers conferred by the law relating to trading with the enemy, and as respects income from moneys invested by custodians of enemy property; as respects copyrights, rights in inventions and designs, and other rights in or in connection with which German enemy interests subsisted, or were properly treated as subsisting, during the period of the war with Germany, as respects property allocated by way of reparation from Germany and as respects other property seized from Germany; and for purposes connected with the matters aforesaid.

=== Local acts ===
Short title	Citation	Royal assent
Long title
Glasgow Corporation Order Confirmation Act 1953	1 & 2 Eliz. 2. c. ii	6 May 1953
An Act to confirm a Provisional Order under the Private Legislation Procedure (Scotland) Act 1936 (Note: Private Legislation Procedure (Scotland) Act 1936 (26 Geo. 5 & 1 Edw. 8. c. 52)) relating to Glasgow Corporation.
	Glasgow Corporation Order 1953	
Aberdeen Harbour Order Confirmation Act 1953 (repealed)	1 & 2 Eliz. 2. c. iii	6 May 1953
An Act to confirm a Provisional Order under the Private Legislation Procedure (Scotland) Act 1936 relating to Aberdeen Harbour. (Repealed by Aberdeen Harbour Order Confirmation Act 1960 (9 & 10 Eliz. 2. c. i))
	Aberdeen Harbour Order 1953	
University of Southampton Act 1953	1 & 2 Eliz. 2. c. iv	6 May 1953
An Act to dissolve the Hartley University College at Southampton founded 1850 registered 1902 and to transfer all the rights property and liabilities of that college to the University of Southampton and for other purposes.
Rhoanglo Group Act 1953	1 & 2 Eliz. 2. c. v	6 May 1953
An Act to provide for the transfer to Northern Rhodesia of the registration of Rhodesian Anglo American Limited Rhokana Corporation Limited Nchanga Consolidated Copper Mines Limited Rhodesia Copper Refineries Limited and the Rhodesia Broken Hill Development Company Limited to apply to those companies the provisions of the Companies Ordinance of the said territory in place of certain provisions of the Companies Act 1948 (Note: Companies Act 1948 (11 & 12 Geo. 6. c. 38)) and for other purposes.
City of London (Central Criminal Court) Act 1953 (repealed)	1 & 2 Eliz. 2. c. vi	6 May 1953
An Act to authorise an increase in the contribution to be made out of the general rate of the City of London for the reconstruction of the Central Criminal Court. (Repealed by Statute Law (Repeals) Act 2008 (c. 12))
National Trust Act 1953	1 & 2 Eliz. 2. c. vii	6 May 1953
An Act to amend the National Trust Acts 1907 to 1939 to confer further powers upon the National Trust for Places of Historic Interest or Natural Beauty and upon the council thereof and for other purposes.
London Hydraulic Power Act 1953	1 & 2 Eliz. 2. c. viii	6 May 1953
An Act to confer further powers on the London Hydraulic Power Company and for other purposes.
South Essex Waterworks Act 1953 (repealed)	1 & 2 Eliz. 2. c. ix	6 May 1953
An Act to authorise the South Essex Waterworks Company to consolidate their ordinary stocks and for other purposes. (Repealed by Essex Water Company (Constitution and Regulation) Order 1991 (SI 1991/1596))
Milford Docks Act 1953	1 & 2 Eliz. 2. c. x	6 May 1953
An Act to make provision with respect to the rates and charges leviable by the Milford Docks Company to confer further powers upon the Company to consolidate with amendments certain of the statutory powers of the Company and for other purposes.
Herts and Essex Water Act 1953	1 & 2 Eliz. 2. c. xi	6 May 1953
An Act to incorporate and confer powers on the Herts and Essex Water Company and for other purposes.
Great Northern London Cemetery (Crematorium) Act 1953	1 & 2 Eliz. 2. c. xii	6 May 1953
An Act to authorise the Great Northern London Cemetery Company to establish a crematorium to empower the said Company to raise additional capital and for other purposes.
Newbury Corporation Act 1953 (repealed)	1 & 2 Eliz. 2. c. xiii	6 May 1953
An Act to provide for the transfer of the undertaking of the Newbury Cemetery Company to the mayor aldermen and burgesses of the borough of Newbury to provide for the extinction of common or commonable rights over certain lands in the borough known as Northcroft to make further provision for the health local government and improvement of the borough and for other purposes. (Repealed by Berkshire Act 1986 (c. ii))
Bromley Corporation Act 1953	1 & 2 Eliz. 2. c. xiv	20 May 1953
An Act to provide for the transfer to the mayor aldermen and burgesses of the borough of Bromley of the powers and duties of the conservators appointed under a scheme for the local management of Hayes Common to enact further provisions with respect to the common to provide that the Corporation shall be the burial authority for the whole borough to make further provision for the improvement health local government and finances of the borough and for other purposes.
Belper Urban District Council Act 1953 (repealed)	1 & 2 Eliz. 2. c. xv	20 May 1953
An Act to authorise the urban district council of Belper to acquire the undertaking of the Belper Market and Fair Company Limited and to establish maintain and carry on or discontinue markets and fairs to confer further powers on the Council in regard to lands and to make further and better provision for the health local government and improvement of their district and for other purposes. (Repealed by Derbyshire Act 1981 (c. xxxiv))
Tees Conservancy Superannuation Scheme Act 1953 (repealed)	1 & 2 Eliz. 2. c. xvi	20 May 1953
An Act to authorise the Tees Conservancy Commissioners to establish and maintain a superannuation scheme for their officers and servants to transfer to that scheme the Tees Commission Superannuation Fund and for other purposes. (Repealed by Tees and Hartlepools Port Authority Act 1966 (c. xxv))
Hospital of St. Mary Magdalen (Colchester) Charity Scheme Confirmation Act 1953	1 & 2 Eliz. 2. c. xvii	14 July 1953
An Act to confirm a Scheme of the Charity Commissioners for the application or management of the Charity known as the Hospital of St. Mary Magdalen, otherwise King James's Hospital, in Colchester, in the county of Essex.
	Scheme for the application or management of the Charity known as the Hospital of St. Mary Magdalen, otherwise King James's Hospital, in Colchester, in the county of Essex.	
Hospital of the Blessed Trinity (Guildford) Charity Scheme Confirmation Act 1953	1 & 2 Eliz. 2. c. xviii	14 July 1953
An Act to confirm a Scheme of the Charity Commissioners for the application or management of the Charity called the Hospital of the Blessed Trinity, in the Borough of Guildford, in the County of Surrey.
	Scheme for the application or management of the Charity called the Hospital of the Blessed Trinity, in the Borough of Guildford, in the County of Surrey, regulated by a Scheme of the Charity Commissioners confirmed by Act of Parliament 24 and 25 Vict. c. 32 (Note: Guildford Hospital Act 1861 (24 & 25 Vict. c. 32)) (including the Bequest of William Birch, founded by will proved in the Principal Registry on the 12th January 1881).	
Clyde Navigation Order Confirmation Act 1953 (repealed)	1 & 2 Eliz. 2. c. xix	14 July 1953
An Act to confirm a Provisional Order under the Private Legislation Procedure (Scotland) Act 1936 relating to Clyde Navigation. (Repealed by Statute Law (Repeals) Act 1998 (c. 43))
	Clyde Navigation Order 1953 Provisional Order to extend the period for the compulsory purchase of certain lands by the Trustees of the Clyde Navigation and for other purposes.	
British Transport Commission Order Confirmation Act 1953	1 & 2 Eliz. 2. c. xx	14 July 1953
An Act to confirm a Provisional Order under the Private Legislation Procedure (Scotland) Act 1936 relating to the British Transport Commission.
	British Transport Commission Order 1953 Provisional Order to empower the British Transport Commission to construct works and to acquire lands to confer further powers on the Commission and for other purposes.	
Bradford Corporation (Trolley Vehicles) Order Confirmation Act 1953 (repealed)	1 & 2 Eliz. 2. c. xxi	14 July 1953
An Act to confirm a Provisional Order made by the Minister of Transport under the Bradford Corporation Act 1910 (Note: Bradford Corporation Act 1910 (10 Edw. 7 & 1 Geo. 5. c. cxvii)) relating to Bradford Corporation trolley vehicles. (Repealed by West Yorkshire Act 1980 (c. xiv))
	Bradford Corporation (Trolley Vehicles) Order 1953 Provisional Order authorising the lord mayor aldermen and citizens of the city of Bradford to use trolley vehicles upon additional routes in the said city.	
Walsall Corporation (Trolley Vehicles) Order Confirmation Act 1953 (repealed)	1 & 2 Eliz. 2. c. xxii	14 July 1953
An Act to confirm a Provisional Order made by the Minister of Transport under the Walsall Corporation Act 1925 (Note: Walsall Corporation Act 1925 (15 & 16 Geo. 5. c. cxxii)) relating to Walsall Corporation trolley vehicles. (Repealed by Walsall Corporation Act 1969 (c. lviii))
	Walsall Corporation (Trolley Vehicles) Order 1953 Provisional Order authorising the mayor aldermen and burgesses of the borough of Walsall to use trolley vehicles upon additional routes in the said borough and the urban districts of Darlaston and Willenhall.	
Land Drainage (Surrey County Council (Rive Ditch Improvement)) Provisional Order Confirmation Act 1953 (repealed)	1 & 2 Eliz. 2. c. xxiii	14 July 1953
An Act to confirm a Provisional Order made by the Minister of Agriculture and Fisheries under the Surrey County Council Act 1936 (Note: Surrey County Council Act 1936 (26 Geo. 5 & 1 Edw. 8. c. cxxx)) for the execution of works for the improvement of the Rive Ditch (Note: Rive Ditch is a tributary of the River Wey, located in West Byfleet.) in the county of Surrey and for other purposes. (Repealed by Surrey Act 1985 (c. iii))
	Surrey County Council (Rive Ditch Improvement) Order 1953 Provisional Order under the Surrey County Council Act 1936 empowering the Surrey County Council to execute works for the improvement of the Rive Ditch in the county of Surrey and for other purposes.	
Great Ouse River Board (Revival of Powers, &c.) Act 1953	1 & 2 Eliz. 2. c. xxiv	14 July 1953
An Act to abandon certain works and to revive certain powers for the acquisition of lands authorised by the River Great Ouse (Flood Protection) Act 1949 (Note: River Great Ouse (Flood Protection) Act 1949 (12, 13 & 14 Geo. 6. c. lx)) and for other purposes.
London County Council (Money) Act 1953 (repealed)	1 & 2 Eliz. 2. c. xxv	14 July 1953
An Act to regulate the expenditure on capital account and lending of money by the London County Council during the financial period from the first day of April nineteen hundred and fifty-three to the thirtieth day of September nineteen hundred and fifty-four to amend the London County Council (Finance Consolidation) Act 1912 (Note: London County Council (Finance Consolidation) Act 1912 (2 & 3 Geo. 5. c. cv)) and Acts amending that Act and for other purposes. (Repealed by London County Council (Loans) Act 1955 (4 & 5 Eliz. 2. c. xxvi))
Runcorn-Widnes Bridge Act 1953	1 & 2 Eliz. 2. c. xxvi	14 July 1953
An Act to extend the time for the acquisition of lands by the Cheshire County Council and the Lancashire County Council under the Cheshire and Lancashire County Councils (Runcorn-Widnes Bridge &c.) Act 1947 and for other purposes.
Gateshead Extension Act 1953 (repealed)	1 & 2 Eliz. 2. c. xxvii	14 July 1953
An Act to extend the boundaries of the county borough of Gateshead and for purposes incidental thereto. (Repealed by Tyne and Wear Act 1980 (c. xliii))
Warkworth Harbour Act 1953	1 & 2 Eliz. 2. c. xxviii	14 July 1953
An Act to empower the Commissioners of Warkworth Harbour to borrow additional moneys to make further provision with respect to the rates tolls and dues leviable by the Commissioners and for other purposes.
Dover Harbour Act 1953 (repealed)	1 & 2 Eliz. 2. c. xxix	14 July 1953
An Act to authorise the Admiralty to convey to the Dover Harbour Board the Admiralty Harbour at Dover to confirm an agreement between the Dover Harbour Board and the British Transport Commission and for other purposes. (Repealed by Dover Harbour Consolidation Act 1954 (2 & 3 Eliz. 2. c. iv))
Metropolitan Water Board Act 1953	1 & 2 Eliz. 2. c. xxx	14 July 1953
An Act to confer further powers upon the Metropolitan Water Board and for other purposes.
Tynemouth Corporation Act 1953	1 & 2 Eliz. 2. c. xxxi	14 July 1953
An Act to empower the mayor aldermen and burgesses of the county borough of Tynemouth to construct a quay extension to make further provision with reference to the local government of the borough and for other purposes.
Huddersfield Corporation Act 1953	1 & 2 Eliz. 2. c. xxxii	14 July 1953
An Act to make further provision with regard to the trolley vehicles public service vehicles and markets undertakings of the mayor aldermen and burgesses of the borough of Huddersfield to make further provision with regard to the improvement health local government and finances of the borough to enact provisions with respect to the superannuation of certain officers and servants and for other purposes.
Newport (Monmouthshire) Corporation Act 1953	1 & 2 Eliz. 2. c. xxxiii	14 July 1953
An Act to authorise the mayor aldermen and burgesses of the borough of Newport to construct additional waterworks to make further provision with respect to their water undertaking and for other purposes.
Tees Valley Water Act 1953	1 & 2 Eliz. 2. c. xxxiv	31 July 1953
An Act to authorise the Tees Valley Water Board to construct additional waterworks and to acquire lands to confer further powers upon the Board and for other purposes.
Dudley Extension Act 1953 (repealed)	1 & 2 Eliz. 2. c. xxxv	31 July 1953
An Act to extend the boundaries of the county borough of Dudley and for purposes incidental thereto. (Repealed by Dudley Corporation Act 1969 (c. liii))
Foundling Hospital Act 1953	1 & 2 Eliz. 2. c. xxxvi	31 July 1953
An Act to make provision for the issue in respect of certain children admitted to the Foundling Hospital of a shortened form of birth certificate and as to the particulars to be inserted therein and for other purposes.
West Bridgford Urban District Council Act 1953 (repealed)	1 & 2 Eliz. 2. c. xxxvii	31 July 1953
An Act to amend the provisions of the West Bridgford Urban District Council Act 1913 (Note: West Bridgford Urban District Council Act 1913 (3 & 4 Geo. 5. c. lviii)) and the West Bridgford Urban District Council Act 1927 (Note: West Bridgford Urban District Council Act 1927 (17 & 18 Geo. 5. c. xxiv)) relating to fares and charges on omnibuses and to make further and better provision for the health local government finance and improvement of their district and for other purposes. (Repealed by Nottinghamshire County Council Act 1985 (c. xv))
Coventry Cathedral Act 1953	1 & 2 Eliz. 2. c. xxxviii	31 July 1953
An Act to make provision with respect to the reconstruction of Coventry Cathedral to provide in connection therewith for the establishment of a Chapel of Unity and a Christian Service Centre and for other purposes.
Oxford Corporation Act 1953 (repealed)	1 & 2 Eliz. 2. c. xxxix	31 July 1953
An Act to make further provision for the improvement health local government and finances of the city of Oxford and for other purposes. (Repealed by Oxfordshire Act 1985 (c. xxxiv))
Cheshire County Council Act 1953	1 & 2 Eliz. 2. c. xl	31 July 1953
An Act to confer further powers on the Cheshire County Council and local authorities in the administrative county of the county palatine of Chester in relation to lands and highways and the local government improvement health and finances of the county to enact provisions with respect to hairdressers' and barbers' premises and public entertainments to make further provision for the superannuation of employees and for other purposes.
Berkshire County Council Act 1953	1 & 2 Eliz. 2. c. xli	31 July 1953
An Act to confer further powers upon the Berkshire County Council and on local and highway authorities in the administrative county of Berks to make provision with regard to markets and fairs in the borough of Abingdon and for other purposes.
British Transport Commission Act 1953	1 & 2 Eliz. 2. c. xlii	31 July 1953
An Act to empower the British Transport Commission to construct works and to acquire lands to authorise the closing for navigation of portions of certain inland waterways to revive the powers and extend the time for the construction of certain works and to extend the time for the compulsory purchase of certain lands to confer further powers on the Commission and for other purposes.
London County Council (General Powers) Act 1953	1 & 2 Eliz. 2. c. xliii	31 July 1953
An Act to confer further powers upon the London County Council and other authorities and for other purposes.

=== Private and personal acts ===
Short title	Citation	Royal assent
Long title
Saint Oswald Estate Act 1953	1 & 2 Eliz. 2. c. 1 Pr.	14 July 1953
An Act for varying certain of the terms of the Will of Rowland Second Baron Saint Oswald deceased and to provide for the permanent preservation of his mansion house of Nostell Priory in the County of York and to enable a more definite provision to be made for the members of his family.

=== Sources ===
- The Public General Acts and Church Assembly Measures of 1953. London: Her Majesty's Stationery Office. 1953. pp. 1–731 – via Google Books.
- The Public General Acts and Church Assembly Measures of 1953. London: Her Majesty's Stationery Office. 1953. pp. 1–731 – via Google Books.
- The Journals of the House of Commons (PDF). Vol. 208 (November 1952 – October 1953). pp. 3–321 – via parliament.uk.
- Chronological Table of the Statutes: Covering the Period from 1235 to the End of 1971. London: Her Majesty's Stationery Office. 1972. pp. 1072–1080. ISBN 978-0-11-840096-1 – via Google Books.
- "UK Public General Acts from 1953". legislation.gov.uk. The National Archives.
- "UK Local Acts from 1953". legislation.gov.uk. The National Archives.
- "Chronological Tables of Local Acts: Part 177 (1952-1954)". legislation.gov.uk. The National Archives.
- "Chronological Tables of the Private and Personal Acts: Part 33 (1910-1987)". legislation.gov.uk. The National Archives.

== 2 & 3 Eliz. 2 ==
The third session of the 40th Parliament of the United Kingdom, which met from 3 November 1953 until 25 November 1954.

=== Public general acts ===
Short title	Citation	Royal assent
Long title
Regency Act 1953	2 & 3 Eliz. 2. c. 1	19 November 1953
An Act to provide that, in the event of a Regency becoming necessary under the Regency Act, 1937, (Note: Regency Act 1937 (1 Edw. 8 & 1 Geo. 6. c. 16)) His Royal Highness the Duke of Edinburgh shall in certain circumstances be the Regent, to provide that the heir apparent or heir presumptive to the Throne shall be deemed for the purposes of that Act to be of full age if he or she has attained the age of eighteen years, to add Her Majesty Queen Elizabeth the Queen Mother to the persons to whom royal functions may be delegated as Counsellors of State, and for purposes connected with the matters aforesaid.
Consolidated Fund (No. 3) Act 1953 (repealed)	2 & 3 Eliz. 2. c. 2	18 December 1953
An Act to apply a sum out of the Consolidated Fund to the service of the year ending on the thirty-first day of March, one thousand nine hundred and fifty-four. (Repealed by Statute Law Revision Act 1964 (c. 79))
Armed Forces (Housing Loans) Act 1953 (repealed)	2 & 3 Eliz. 2. c. 3	18 December 1953
An Act to extend the Armed Forces (Housing Loans) Act, 1949. (Note: Armed Forces (Housing Loans) Act 1949 (12, 13 & 14 Geo. 6. c. 77)) (Repealed by Armed Forces (Housing Loans) Act 1958 (7 & 8 Eliz. 2. c. 1))
Post Office and Telegraph (Money) Act 1953 (repealed)	2 & 3 Eliz. 2. c. 4	18 December 1953
An Act to provide for raising further money for the development of the postal, telegraphic and telephonic systems and of any other business of the Post Office; and for purposes connected with that matter. (Repealed by Post Office Act 1961 (9 & 10 Eliz. 2. c. 15))
Statute Law Revision Act 1953	2 & 3 Eliz. 2. c. 5	18 December 1953
An Act for further promoting the Revision of the Statute Law by repealing Enactments which have ceased to be in force or have become unnecessary and by correcting certain errors in the First Schedule to the Statute Law Revision Act, 1950, (Note: Statute Law Revision Act 1950 (14 Geo. 6. c. 6)) and for facilitating the publication of Revised Editions of the Statutes.
Public Works Loans Act 1953 (repealed)	2 & 3 Eliz. 2. c. 6	18 December 1953
An Act to grant money for the purpose of certain local loans out of the Local Loans Fund. (Repealed by Public Works Loans Act 1964 (c. 9))
Air Corporations Act 1953 (repealed)	2 & 3 Eliz. 2. c. 7	18 December 1953
An Act to increase the borrowing powers of the British Overseas Airways Corporation and the British European Airways Corporation; to make provision for the payment of pension benefits in respect of the service of members of those corporations; and to amend the law with respect to the limitation of actions and other proceedings against those corporations or their servants or agents. (Repealed by Air Corporations Act 1967 (c. 33))
Electoral Registers Act 1953 (repealed)	2 & 3 Eliz. 2. c. 8	18 December 1953
An Act to alter the date for the publication, in the year nineteen hundred and fifty-five and subsequent years, of registers of parliamentary and local government electors, and consequentially on that alteration to alter the elections for which those registers are to be used, and the qualifying date for those elections, and make further provision in place of section four of the Electoral Registers Act, 1949. (Note: Electoral Registers Act 1949 (12, 13 & 14 Geo. 6. c. 86)) (Repealed by Representation of the People Act 1983 (c. 2))
Expiring Laws Continuance Act 1953 (repealed)	2 & 3 Eliz. 2. c. 9	18 December 1953
An Act to continue certain expiring laws. (Repealed by Statute Law Revision Act 1963 (c. 30))

=== Local acts ===
Short title	Citation	Royal assent
Long title
Glasgow Corporation (Water, &c.) Order Confirmation Act 1953	2 & 3 Eliz. 2. c. i	18 December 1953
An Act to confirm a Provisional Order under the Private Legislation Procedure (Scotland) Act, 1936, (Note: Private Legislation Procedure (Scotland) Act 1936 (26 Geo. 5 & 1 Edw. 8. c. 52)) relating to Glasgow Corporation (Water &c.).
	Glasgow Corporation (Water, &c.) Order 1953	
Inverness Harbour Order Confirmation Act 1953	2 & 3 Eliz. 2. c. ii	18 December 1953
An Act to confirm a Provisional Order under the Private Legislation Procedure (Scotland) Act, 1936, relating to Inverness Harbour.
	Inverness Harbour Order 1953	

=== Sources ===
- The Public General Acts and Church Assembly Measures of 1953. London: Her Majesty's Stationery Office. 1953. pp. 732–815 – via Google Books.
- The Public General Acts and Church Assembly Measures of 1953. London: Her Majesty's Stationery Office. 1953. pp. 732–815 – via Google Books.
- The Journals of the House of Commons (PDF). Vol. 209 (November 1953 – November 1954). pp. 3–374 – via parliament.uk.
- Chronological Table of the Statutes: Covering the Period from 1235 to the End of 1971. London: Her Majesty's Stationery Office. 1972. p. 1080. ISBN 978-0-11-840096-1 – via Google Books.
- "UK Public General Acts from 1953". legislation.gov.uk. The National Archives.
- "UK Local Acts from 1953". legislation.gov.uk. The National Archives.
- "Chronological Tables of Local Acts: Part 177 (1952-1954)". legislation.gov.uk. The National Archives.

== See also ==
- List of acts of the Parliament of the United Kingdom
