= Allied Moving Services =

Moving company

- Industry: relocation
- Founded: 1926
- Headquarters: Australia
- Area served: Australia, New Zealand, United Arab Emirates, Hong Kong, Malaysia, Singapore, and India
- Owner: SIRVA
- Website: www.allied.com/au/, www.allied.com/nz/, www.allied.com/ae/, www.allied.com/hk/, www.allied.com/my/, www.allied.com/sg/, www.allied.com/in/

Allied Moving Services is a moving company in Australia, New Zealand, United Arab Emirates, Hong Kong, Malaysia, Singapore, and India. It maintains 40 branches across all states of Australia, and over 600 locations worldwide providing removal services across the entire country, and is a subsidiary of SIRVA.

== History ==
Allied Australia was established in 1926 as family-owned moving company named Downard Transport. In 1973 a joint venture was formed with Gascoyne Trading Company to enter the interstate freight forwarding market between Victoria and Western Australia. In 1982, British-based Pickfords, bought the company to form Downard Pickfords.

In 1991, as part of a global rebranding exercise, Downard Pickfords became Allied Pickfords. In 1996, Allied Pickfords was included in the sale of Pickfords by the National Freight Corporation to Allied Van Lines. In 1999 Allied Van Lines was purchased by Clayton, Dubilier & Rice and merged with North American Van Lines to become SIRVA.

In August 2020, as part of global rebranding, the company changed its name from Allied Pickfords Australia to Allied Moving Services, remaining a SIRVA subsidiary. The movers and drivers are often referred to in country as Allied Removalists.

Partners in New Zealand, United Arab Emirates, Hong Kong, India, Malaysia, and Singapore have also transitioned from the brand name, 'Allied Pickfords' to 'Allied Moving Services'.

== Business ==
Allied Moving Services Australia has 400 year-round employees, with an additional 50-100 seasonal workers during the removals busy season, November to February.
