= List of acts of the Parliament of the United Kingdom from 1928 =

This is a complete list of acts of the Parliament of the United Kingdom for the year 1928.

Note that the first parliament of the United Kingdom was held in 1801; parliaments between 1707 and 1800 were either parliaments of Great Britain or of Ireland). For acts passed up until 1707, see the list of acts of the Parliament of England and the list of acts of the Parliament of Scotland. For acts passed from 1707 to 1800, see the list of acts of the Parliament of Great Britain. See also the list of acts of the Parliament of Ireland.

For acts of the devolved parliaments and assemblies in the United Kingdom, see the list of acts of the Scottish Parliament, the list of acts of the Northern Ireland Assembly, and the list of acts and measures of Senedd Cymru; see also the list of acts of the Parliament of Northern Ireland.

The number shown after each act's title is its chapter number. Acts passed before 1963 are cited using this number, preceded by the year(s) of the reign during which the relevant parliamentary session was held; thus the Union with Ireland Act 1800 is cited as "39 & 40 Geo. 3 c. 67", meaning the 67th act passed during the session that started in the 39th year of the reign of George III and which finished in the 40th year of that reign. Note that the modern convention is to use Arabic numerals in citations (thus "41 Geo. 3" rather than "41 Geo. III"). Acts of the last session of the Parliament of Great Britain and the first session of the Parliament of the United Kingdom are both cited as "41 Geo. 3". Acts passed from 1963 onwards are simply cited by calendar year and chapter number.

== 18 & 19 Geo. 5 ==
The fourth session of the 34th Parliament of the United Kingdom, which met from 7 February 1928 until 3 August 1928.

This session was also traditionally cited as 18 & 19 G. 5.

=== Public general acts ===
Short title	Citation	Royal assent
Long title
Consolidated Fund (No. 1) Act 1928 (repealed)	18 & 19 Geo. 5. c. 1	28 March 1928
An Act to apply certain sums out of the Consolidated Fund to the service of the years ending on the thirty-first day of March, one thousand nine hundred and twenty-seven, one thousand nine hundred and twenty-eight and one thousand nine hundred and twenty-nine. (Repealed by Statute Law Revision Act 1950 (14 Geo. 6. c. 6))
Protection of Lapwings Act 1928 (repealed)	18 & 19 Geo. 5. c. 2	28 March 1928
An Act for the protection of the Lapwing. (Repealed by Protection of Birds Act 1954 (2 & 3 Eliz. 2. c. 30))
Patents and Designs (Convention) Act 1928 (repealed)	18 & 19 Geo. 5. c. 3	28 March 1928
An Act to make such amendments of the Patents and Designs Acts, 1907 (Note: Patents and Designs Act 1907 (7 Edw. 7. c. 29)) and 1919, (Note: Patents and Designs Act 1919 (9 & 10 Geo. 5. c. 80)) as are necessary to enable effect to be given to a Convention for the Protection of Industrial Property. (Repealed by Patents, Designs and Marks Act 1986 (c. 39))
Industrial and Provident Societies (Amendment) Act 1928 (repealed)	18 & 19 Geo. 5. c. 4	28 March 1928
An Act to amend section twenty-two of the Industrial and Provident Societies Act, 1893. (Note: Industrial and Provident Societies Act 1893 (56 & 57 Vict. c. 39)) (Repealed by Industrial and Provident Societies Act 1965 (c. 12))
British Guiana Act 1928 (repealed)	18 & 19 Geo. 5. c. 5	28 March 1928
An Act to make provision for the Government of the Colony of British Guiana. (Repealed by Guyana Independence Act 1966 (c. 14))
Rating (Scotland) Amendment Act 1928 (repealed)	18 & 19 Geo. 5. c. 6	28 March 1928
An Act to amend the Rating (Scotland) Act, 1926, (Note: Rating (Scotland) Act 1926 (16 & 17 Geo. 5. c. 47)) with respect to the ascertainment of the amount of the additional annual grant for Scotland under the Agricultural Rates Act, 1923, (Note: Agricultural Rates Act 1923 (13 & 14 Geo. 5. c. 39)) and the payments to rating authorities in respect of that grant and in certain other respects. (Repealed by Statute Law Revision Act 1950 (14 Geo. 6. c. 6))
Army and Air Force (Annual) Act 1928 (repealed)	18 & 19 Geo. 5. c. 7	26 April 1928
An Act to provide, during Twelve Months, for the Discipline and Regulation of the Army and Air Force. (Repealed by Statute Law Revision Act 1950 (14 Geo. 6. c. 6) and Revision of the Army and Air Force Acts (Transitional Provisions) Act 1955 (3 & 4 Eliz. 2. c. 20))
Rating and Valuation Act 1928 (repealed)	18 & 19 Geo. 5. c. 8	10 May 1928
An Act to extend to the administrative County of London the provisions of the Rating and Valuation Act, 1925, (Note: Rating and Valuation Act 1925 (15 & 16 Geo. 5. c. 90)) with respect to the valuation of hereditaments, containing machinery and plant, to make temporary provision with respect to the deductions to be made in ascertaining rateable value, to amend sections eleven and thirty-seven and the Fourth and Fifth Schedules of the said Act, and to provide for obtaining decisions, on points of law with a view to securing uniformity in valuation. (Repealed by General Rate Act 1967 (c. 9))
Local Authorities (Emergency Provisions) Act 1928 (repealed)	18 & 19 Geo. 5. c. 9	10 May 1928
An Act to extend further the duration of the Local Authorities (Emergency Provisions) Act, 1923, (Note: Local Authorities (Emergency Provisions) Act 1923 (13 & 14 Geo. 5. c. 6)) and to amend temporarily the provisions as to the Metropolitan Common Poor Fund. (Repealed by Local Government Act 1929 (19 & 20 Geo. 5. c. 17), Local Government Act 1933 (23 & 24 Geo. 5. c. 51) and Statute Law Revision Act 1950 (14 Geo. 6. c. 6))
Teachers (Superannuation) Act 1928 (repealed)	18 & 19 Geo. 5. c. 10	2 July 1928
An Act to amend section eleven of the Teachers (Superannuation) Act, 1925, (Note: Teachers (Superannuation) Act 1925 (15 & 16 Geo. 5. c. 59)) and paragraph (d) of subsection (1) of section four of the Education (Scotland) (Superannuation) Act, 1925. (Note: Education (Scotland) (Superannuation) Act 1925 (15 & 16 Geo. 5. c. 55)) (Repealed by Teachers (Superannuation) Act 1933 (23 & 24 Geo. 5. c. 22))
Cotton Industry Act 1928 (repealed)	18 & 19 Geo. 5. c. 11	2 July 1928
An Act to provide for the collection of a contribution by cotton spinners in Great Britain to the funds of the Empire Cotton Growing Corporation; and for other matters relating to the cotton industry. (Repealed by Statute Law Revision Act 1950 (14 Geo. 6. c. 6))
Representation of the People (Equal Franchise) Act 1928 (repealed)	18 & 19 Geo. 5. c. 12	2 July 1928
An Act to assimilate the franchises for men and women in respect of parliamentary and local government elections; and for purposes consequential thereon. (Repealed by Representation of the People Act 1948 (11 & 12 Geo. 6. c. 65))
Currency and Bank Notes Act 1928	18 & 19 Geo. 5. c. 13	2 July 1928
An Act to amend the law relating to the issue of bank notes by the Bank of England and by banks in Scotland and Northern Ireland, and to provide for the transfer to the Bank of England of the currency notes issue and of the assets appropriated for the redemption thereof, and to make certain provisions with respect to gold reserves and otherwise in connection with the matters aforesaid and to prevent the defacement of bank notes.
National Health Insurance Act 1928 (repealed)	18 & 19 Geo. 5. c. 14	2 July 1928
An Act to amend the National Health Insurance Act, 1924, (Note: National Health Insurance Act 1924 (14 & 15 Geo. 5. c. 38)) and other enactments relating to health insurance. (Repealed by National Health Insurance Act 1936 (26 Geo. 5 & 1 Edw. 8. c. 32))
Bankers (Northern Ireland) Act 1928	18 & 19 Geo. 5. c. 15	2 July 1928
An Act to reduce and re-apportion the aggregate amount of the fiduciary bank-note issues of banks in Northern Ireland, and to restrict the circulation in Northern Ireland of notes issued outside the United Kingdom, and otherwise to amend the Bankers (Ireland) Act, 1845, (Note: Bankers (Ireland) Act 1845 (8 & 9 Vict. c. 37)) in its application to Northern Ireland.
Mr. Speaker's Retirement Act 1928 (repealed)	18 & 19 Geo. 5. c. 16	3 August 1928
An Act to settle and secure an annuity upon the Right Honourable John Henry Whitley in consideration of his eminent services. (Repealed by Statute Law Revision Act 1950 (14 Geo. 6. c. 6))
Finance Act 1928	18 & 19 Geo. 5. c. 17	3 August 1928
An Act to grant certain duties of Customs and Inland Revenue (including Excise), to alter other duties, and to amend the law relating to Customs and Inland Revenue (including Excise) and the National Debt, and to make further provision in connection with finance.
Appropriation Act 1928 (repealed)	18 & 19 Geo. 5. c. 18	3 August 1928
An Act to apply a sum out of the Consolidated Fund to the service of the year ending on the thirty-first day of March, one thousand nine hundred and twenty-nine, and to appropriate the Supplies granted in this Session of Parliament. (Repealed by Statute Law Revision Act 1950 (14 Geo. 6. c. 6))
Agricultural Produce (Grading and Marking) Act 1928 (repealed)	18 & 19 Geo. 5. c. 19	3 August 1928
An Act to provide for the grading and marking of agricultural produce and for purposes connected with the matters aforesaid. (Repealed by Deregulation Act 2015 (c. 20))
Petroleum (Amendment) Act 1928 (repealed)	18 & 19 Geo. 5. c. 20	3 August 1928
An Act to amend the enactments relating to petroleum and to petroleum-spirit. (Repealed by Petroleum (Consolidation) Act 1928 (18 & 19 Geo. 5. c. 32))
Dogs (Amendment) Act 1928	18 & 19 Geo. 5. c. 21	3 August 1928
An Act to amend the Dogs Act, 1906. (Note: Dogs Act 1906 (6 Edw. 7. c. 32))
Solicitors Act 1928 (repealed)	18 & 19 Geo. 5. c. 22	3 August 1928
An Act to amend the law relating to solicitors. (Repealed by Solicitors Act 1932 (22 & 23 Geo. 5. c. 37))
Straits Settlements and Johore Territorial Waters (Agreement) Act 1928 (repealed)	18 & 19 Geo. 5. c. 23	3 August 1928
An Act to approve an Agreement concluded between His Majesty and the Sultan of the State and Territory of Johore. (Repealed by Statute Law (Repeals) Act 1973 (c. 39))
Northern Ireland (Miscellaneous Provisions) Act 1928	18 & 19 Geo. 5. c. 24	3 August 1928
An Act to make miscellaneous amendments in the law applicable to Northern Ireland.
Representation of the People (Reading University) Act 1928 (repealed)	18 & 19 Geo. 5. c. 25	3 August 1928
An Act to make provision with respect to the representation of the University of Reading in Parliament. (Repealed by Representation of the People Act 1948 (11 & 12 Geo. 6. c. 65))
Administration of Justice Act 1928 (repealed)	18 & 19 Geo. 5. c. 26	3 August 1928
An Act to amend the provisions of the Supreme Court of Judicature (Consolidation) Act, 1925, (Note: Supreme Court of Judicature (Consolidation) Act 1925 (15 & 16 Geo. 5. c. 49)) relating to probate registrars and registries, and certain other matters, and to amend the law with respect to the constitution of the Judicial Committee of the Privy Council, and otherwise with respect to the administration of justice and matters connected therewith. (Repealed for England and Wales by Senior Courts Act 1981 (c. 54) and for Scotland by Law Reform (Parent and Child) (Scotland) Act 1986 (c. 9))
Betting (Juvenile Messengers) (Scotland) Act 1928 (repealed)	18 & 19 Geo. 5. c. 27	3 August 1928
An Act to prohibit the use of young persons in the conveyance or delivery of messages or information relating to betting; and for purposes connected therewith. (Repealed by Betting and Gaming Act 1960 (8 & 9 Eliz. 2. c. 60))
Education (Scotland) Act 1928 (repealed)	18 & 19 Geo. 5. c. 28	3 August 1928
An Act to amend paragraph (b) of section eleven of the Education (Scotland) Act, 1883. (Note: Education (Scotland) Act 1883 (46 & 47 Vict. c. 560) (Repealed by Education (Scotland) Act 1945 (8 & 9 Geo. 6. c. 37))
Slaughter of Animals (Scotland) Act 1928 (repealed)	18 & 19 Geo. 5. c. 29	3 August 1928
An Act to provide for the humane slaughter of animals in Scotland. (Repealed by Slaughter of Animals (Scotland) Act 1980 (c. 13))
Educational Endowments (Scotland) Act 1928 (repealed)	18 & 19 Geo. 5. c. 30	3 August 1928
An Act to make further provision for the re-organisation of educational and other endowments in Scotland. (Repealed by Reorganisation of Offices (Scotland) Act 1939 (2 & 3 Geo. 6. c. 20), Education (Scotland) Act 1945 (8 & 9 Geo. 6. c. 37) and Education (Scotland) Act 1946 (9 & 10 Geo. 6. c. 72))
Food and Drugs (Adulteration) Act 1928 (repealed)	18 & 19 Geo. 5. c. 31	3 August 1928
An Act to consolidate the Sale of Food and Drugs Acts. (Repealed for England and Wales by Food and Drugs Act 1938 (1 & 2 Geo. 6. c. 56), for Northern Ireland by Statute Law Revision Act 1950 (14 Geo. 6. c. 6) and for Scotland by Food and Drugs (Scotland) Act 1956 (4 & 5 Eliz. 2. c. 30))
Petroleum (Consolidation) Act 1928 (repealed)	18 & 19 Geo. 5. c. 32	3 August 1928
An Act to consolidate the enactments relating to petroleum and to petroleum-spirit. (Repealed by Petroleum (Consolidation) Regulations 2014 (SI 2014/1637))
Shops (Hours of Closing) Act 1928 (repealed)	18 & 19 Geo. 5. c. 33	3 August 1928
An Act to amend the law relating to the closing of shops; and for purposes connected therewith. (Repealed by Shops Act 1950 (14 Geo. 6. c. 28))
Reorganisation of Offices (Scotland) Act 1928	18 & 19 Geo. 5. c. 34	3 August 1928
An Act to provide for the transference of the respective powers and duties of the Scottish Board of Health, the Board of Agriculture for Scotland, and the Prison Commissioners for Scotland, to Departments of Health and Agriculture and a Prisons Department for Scotland, and to make further provision with regard to the office of Chairman of the Fishery Board for Scotland and other offices in Scotland, and with regard to the Public Registers, Records and Rolls of Scotland.
Easter Act 1928	18 & 19 Geo. 5. c. 35	3 August 1928
An Act to regulate the date of Easter Day and days or other periods and occasions depending thereon.
Naval Prize Act 1928 (repealed)	18 & 19 Geo. 5. c. 36	3 August 1928
An Act to make provision for winding up the Naval Prize Fund and the dissolution of the tribunal established under the Naval Prize Act, 1918. (Note: Naval Prize Act 1918 (8 & 9 Geo. 5. c. 30)) (Repealed by Defence (Transfer of Functions) (No. 1) Order 1964 (SI 1964/488))
Post Office and Telegraph (Money) Act 1928 (repealed)	18 & 19 Geo. 5. c. 37	3 August 1928
An Act to provide for raising further money for the development of the postal, telegraphic and telephonic systems. (Repealed by Statute Law Revision Act 1958 (6 & 7 Eliz. 2. c. 46))
Isle of Man (Customs) Act 1928 (repealed)	18 & 19 Geo. 5. c. 38	3 August 1928
An Act to amend the law with respect to Customs in the Isle of Man. (Repealed by Isle of Man (Customs) Act 1938 (1 & 2 Geo. 6. c. 68))
Rag Flock Act (1911) Amendment Act 1928 (repealed)	18 & 19 Geo. 5. c. 39	3 August 1928
An Act to amend the Rag Flock Act, 1911. (Note: Rag Flock Act 1911 (1 & 2 Geo. 5. c. 52)) (Repealed for England and Wales and Scotland by Rag Flock and Other Filling Materials Act 1951 (14 & 15 Geo. 6. c. 63) and for Northern Ireland by Deregulation (Northern Ireland) Order 1997 (SI 1997/2984 (N.I. 22)))
Merchant Shipping (Line-throwing Appliance) Act 1928 (repealed)	18 & 19 Geo. 5. c. 40	3 August 1928
An Act to make provision for a line-throwing appliance on certain ships. (Repealed by Merchant Shipping (Safety Convention) Act 1949 (12, 13 & 14 Geo. 6. c. 43))
Racecourse Betting Act 1928 (repealed)	18 & 19 Geo. 5. c. 41	3 August 1928
An Act to amend the Betting Act, 1853, (Note: Betting Act 1853 (16 & 17 Vict. c. 119)) to legalise the use of totalisators on certain racecourses, and to make further provision with regard to betting thereon. (Repealed by Betting, Gaming and Lotteries Act 1963 (c. 2))
Criminal Law Amendment Act 1928 (repealed)	18 & 19 Geo. 5. c. 42	3 August 1928
An Act to amend the law with respect to offences against persons under the age of sixteen. (Repealed for England and Wales by Sexual Offences Act 1956 (4 & 5 Eliz. 2. c. 69) and for Scotland by Sexual Offences (Scotland) Act 1976 (c. 67))
Agricultural Credits Act 1928	18 & 19 Geo. 5. c. 43	3 August 1928
An Act to secure, by means of the formation of a company and the assistance thereof out of public funds, the making of loans for agricultural purposes on favourable terms, and to facilitate the borrowing of money on the security of farming stock and other agricultural assets, and for purposes connected therewith.
Rating and Valuation (Apportionment) Act 1928 (repealed)	18 & 19 Geo. 5. c. 44	3 August 1928
An Act to make provision, with a view to the grant of relief from rates in respect of certain classes of hereditaments, for the distinction in valuation lists of the classes of hereditaments to be affected, and the apportionment in valuation lists of the net annual values of such hereditaments according to the extent of the user thereof for various purposes. (Repealed for England and Wales by General Rate Act 1967 (c. 9) and for Scotland by Local Government and Rating Act 1997 (c. 29))
Companies Act 1928 (repealed)	18 & 19 Geo. 5. c. 45	3 August 1928
An Act to amend the Companies Acts, 1908 to 1917, and for purposes connected therewith. (Repealed for England and Wales and Scotland by Companies Act 1929 (19 & 20 Geo. 5. c. 23) and for Northern Ireland by Companies Act (Northern Ireland) 1932 (22 & 23 Geo. 5. c. 7 (N.I.)))
Theatrical Employers Registration (Amendment) Act 1928 (repealed)	18 & 19 Geo. 5. c. 46	3 August 1928
An Act to amend the Theatrical Employers Registration Act, 1925. (Note: Theatrical Employers Registration Act 1925 (15 & 16 Geo. 5. c. 50)) (Repealed by Local Government (Miscellaneous Provisions) Act 1982 (c. 30))

=== Local acts ===
Short title	Citation	Royal assent
Long title
Sunderland Corporation Act 1928 (repealed)	18 & 19 Geo. 5. c. i	28 March 1928
An Act to authorise the mayor aldermen and burgesses of the borough of Sunderland to free the Queen Alexandra Bridge over the River Wear from tolls and for other purposes. (Repealed by Tyne and Wear Act 1980 (c. xliii))
Bromborough Dock Act 1928 (repealed)	18 & 19 Geo. 5. c. ii	26 April 1928
An Act to extend the periods limited by the Bromborough Dock Act 1923 (Note: Bromborough Dock Act 1923 (13 & 14 Geo. 5. c. lxxii)) for making and completing the dock and the other works by that Act authorised. (Repealed by Bromborough Dock Act 1986 (c. xviii))
Mersey Tunnel Act 1928	18 & 19 Geo. 5. c. iii	26 April 1928
An Act to authorise an alteration of the tunnel authorised by the Mersey Tunnel Act 1925 (Note: Mersey Tunnel Act 1925 (15 & 16 Geo. 5. c. cx)) and for other purposes.
Barnet District Gas and Water Act 1928 (repealed)	18 & 19 Geo. 5. c. iv	26 April 1928
An Act to confer further powers on the Barnet District Gas and Water Company and for other purposes. (Repealed by Lee Valley Water Act 1959 (7 & 8 Eliz. 2. c. li))
Harwich Harbour Act 1928 (repealed)	18 & 19 Geo. 5. c. v	10 May 1928
An Act to confer further powers upon the Harwich Harbour Conservancy Board relating to vessels sunk stranded or abandoned and for other purposes. (Repealed by Harwich Harbour Act 1974 (c. i))
Mersey Docks and Harbour Board Act 1928	18 & 19 Geo. 5. c. vi	10 May 1928
An Act to increase the borrowing, powers of the Mersey Docks and Harbour Board to extend the period for the completion of works and for other purposes.
Governments Stock and other Securities Investment Company Act 1928	18 & 19 Geo. 5. c. vii	10 May 1928
An Act for regulating the capital and altering the constitution of the Governments Stock and other Securities Investment Company Limited and repealing the Governments Stock and other Securities Investment Company Limited Acts 1887 (Note: Governments Stock Investment Company Act 1887 (50 & 51 Vict. c. xxxii)) and 1900 (Note: Governments Stock and other Securities Investment Company Act 1900 (63 & 64 Vict. c. xxxi)) and for other purposes.
Bournemouth-Swanage Motor Road and Ferry Act 1928	18 & 19 Geo. 5. c. viii	10 May 1928
An Act to empower the Bournemouth-Swanage Motor Road and Ferry Company to raise additional capital and for other purposes.
Provisional Orders (Marriages) Confirmation Act 1928 (repealed)	18 & 19 Geo. 5. c. ix	10 May 1928
An Act to confirm certain Provisional Orders made by one of His Majesty's Principal Secretaries of State under the Marriages Validity (Provisional Orders) Acts 1905 (Note: Provisional Order (Marriages) Act 1905 (5 Edw. 7. c. 23)) and 1924. (Note: Marriages Validity (Provisional Orders) Act 1924 (14 & 15 Geo. 5. c. 20)). (Repealed by Statute Law (Repeals) Act 1977 (c. 18))
	Saint Michael and All Angel Westcliff Order	
	Saint Stephen Haslingden Grane Order	
Ministry of Health Provisional Orders Confirmation (No. 1) Act 1928	18 & 19 Geo. 5. c. x	10 May 1928
An Act to confirm certain Provisional Orders of the Minister of Health relating to Brighton Llanelly Saint Asaph Joint Hospital District St. Helens Skelmersdale and Wallingford and Crowmarsh Joint Hospital District.
	Brighton Order 1927 (Note: Although passed in 1928, the short title is specified as the Brighton Order 1927.) Provisional Order for amending certain local Acts.	
	Llanelly Order 1927 (Note: Although passed in 1928, the short title is specified as the Llanelly Order 1927.) Provisional Order for altering the Llanelly Corporation Water Act 1920 (Note: Llanelly Corporation Water Act 1920 (10 & 11 Geo. 5. c. cxliii)) and the Ministry of Health Provisional Orders Confirmation (No. 2) Act 1925. (Note: Ministry of Health Provisional Orders Confirmation (No. 2) Act 1925 (15 & 16 Geo. 5. c. xxxvii))	
	Saint Asaph Joint Hospital Order 1927 (Note: Although passed in 1928, the short title is specified as the Saint Asaph Joint Hospital Order 1927.) Provisional Order for forming a United District under Section 279 of the Public Health Act 1875. (Note: Public Health Act 1875 (38 & 39 Vict. c. 55))	
	St. Helens Order 1928 Provisional Order for partially repealing and altering certain Local Acts.	
	Skelmersdale Order 1928 Provisional Order for altering the Southport Birkdale and West Lancashire Water Board Act 1907. (Note: Southport Birkdale and West Lancashire Water Board Act 1907 (7 Edw. 7. c. lxviii))	
	Wallingford and Crowmarsh Hospital Order 1928 Provisional Order for altering the Local Government Board's Provisional Orders Confirmation (No. 8) Act 1899. (Note: Local Government Board's Provisional Orders Confirmation (No. 8) Act 1899 (62 & 63 Vict. c. cxii))	
Ministry of Health Provisional Order Confirmation (No. 2) Act 1928	18 & 19 Geo. 5. c. xi	10 May 1928
An Act to confirm a Provisional Order of the Minister of Health relating to Acton and Ealing.
	Acton and Ealing Order 1928 Provisional Order for altering the Metropolis Water Act 1902. (Note: Metropolis Water Act 1902 (2 Edw. 7. c. 41))	
Ministry of Health Provisional Order Confirmation (Ealing Extension) Act 1928 (repealed)	18 & 19 Geo. 5. c. xii	10 May 1928
An Act to confirm a Provisional Order of the Minister of Health relating to Ealing. (Repealed by Local Law (North West London Boroughs) Order 1965 (SI 1965/533))
	Ealing (Extension) Order 1928 Provisional Order made in pursuance of the Local Government Act 1888 (Note: Local Government Act 1888 (51 & 52 Vict. c. 41)) for the extension of a Borough.	
Ministry of Health Provisional Order Confirmation (Luton Extension) Act 1928 (repealed)	18 & 19 Geo. 5. c. xiii	10 May 1928
An Act to confirm a Provisional Order of the Minister of Health relating to Luton. (Repealed by Luton Borough Council Act 1985 (c. xi))
	Luton (Extension) Order 1928 Provisional Order made in pursuance of the Local Government Act 1888 for extending a Borough.	
Post Office (Sites) Act 1928	18 & 19 Geo. 5. c. xiv	2 July 1928
An Act to enable the Postmaster-General, for the purpose of the Post Office, to acquire lands in Manchester, Warrington, Ashton-under-Lyne, Denton and Uxbridge, and to make a subway under a disused burial ground in Westminster, (Note: The disused burial ground was Mount Street Gardens.) and to erect buildings on a disused burial ground in Leeds, and for purposes connected therewith.
Richmond Parish Charity Lands Scheme Confirmation Act 1928 (repealed)	18 & 19 Geo. 5. c. xv	2 July 1928
An Act to confirm a Scheme of the Charity Commissioners for the application or management of the Charity called or known as the Richmond Parish Charity Lands in the parish of Richmond in the county of Surrey. (Repealed by Statute Law (Repeals) Act 2013 (c. 2))
	Scheme for the application or management of the Charity called or known as the Richmond Parish Charity Lands in the parish of Richmond in the county of Surrey.	
London, Midland and Scottish Railway Order Confirmation Act 1928	18 & 19 Geo. 5. c. xvi	2 July 1928
An Act to confirm a Provisional Order under the Private Legislation Procedure (Scotland) Act 1899 (Note: Private Legislation Procedure (Scotland) Act 1899 (62 & 63 Vict. c. 47)) relating to the London Midland and Scottish Railway.
	London Midland and Scottish Railway Order 1928 Provisional Order to authorise the London Midland and Scottish Railway Company to acquire lands to extend the time for the completion of certain authorised works and for other purposes.	
Ministry of Health Provisional Orders Confirmation (No. 3) Act 1928	18 & 19 Geo. 5. c. xvii	2 July 1928
An Act to confirm certain Provisional Orders of the Minister of Health relating to Basingstoke Bingley Brighton Halifax Mansfield and Taf Fechan Water Supply Board.
	Basingstoke Order 1928 Provisional Order for partially repealing a Local Act (Note: Basingstoke Market Act 1829 (10 Geo. 4. c. xlii)) and for other purposes.	
	Bingley Order 1928 Provisional Order for altering the Bingley Water and Improvement Act 1881. (Note: Bingley Water and Improvement Act 1881 (44 & 45 Vict. c. lxxxiv))	
	Brighton (Acquisition of Lands) Order 1928 Provisional Order to enable the Brighton Corporation to put in force the Compulsory Clauses of the Lands Clauses Acts.	
	Halifax Order 1928 Provisional Order for altering the Halifax Corporation Act 1911. (Note: Halifax Corporation Act 1911 (1 & 2 Geo. 5. c. cxiii))	
	Mansfield Order 1928 Provisional Order for altering and amending a Local Act. (Note: Mansfield Corporation Act 1925 (15 & 16 Geo. 5. c. xcviii))	
	Taf Fechan Water Order 1928 Provisional Order for altering certain Local Acts.	
Ministry of Health Provisional Orders Confirmation (No. 4) Act 1928	18 & 19 Geo. 5. c. xviii	2 July 1928
An Act to confirm certain Provisional Orders of the Minister of Health relating to Cardiff Chesterfield Haverfordwest Leyton Spalding and Wallsend.
	Cardiff Order 1928 Provisional Order to enable the Cardiff Corporation to put in force the Compulsory Clauses of the Lands Clauses Acts.	
	Chesterfield Order 1928 Provisional Order for altering the Chesterfield Corporation Act 1923. (Note: Chesterfield Corporation Act 1923 (13 & 14 Geo. 5. c. xcix))	
	Haverfordwest Order 1928 Provisional Order for altering certain Local Acts and Provisional Orders.	
	Leyton Order 1928 Provisional Order to enable the Leyton Corporation to put in force the Compulsory Clauses of the Lands Clauses Acts.	
	Spalding Order 1928 Provisional Order for partially repealing altering or amending the Spalding Improvement Act 1853. (Note: Spalding Improvement Act 1853 (16 & 17 Vict. c. cxxxix))	
	Wallsend Order 1928 Provisional Order to enable the Wallsend Corporation to put in force the Compulsory Clauses of the Lands Clauses Acts.	
Ministry of Health Provisional Order Confirmation (Peterborough Extension) Act 1928	18 & 19 Geo. 5. c. xix	2 July 1928
An Act to confirm a Provisional Order of the Minister of Health relating to Peterborough.
	Peterborough (Extension) Order 1928 Provisional Order made in pursuance of the Local Government Act 1888 for the extension of a Borough.	
Ministry of Health Provisional Order Confirmation (Torquay Extension) Act 1928 (repealed)	18 & 19 Geo. 5. c. xx	2 July 1928
An Act to confirm a Provisional Order of the Minister of Health relating to Torquay. (Repealed by Torbay Corporation Act 1971 (c. xxxiii))
	Torquay (Extension) Order 1928 Provisional Order made in pursuance of the Local Government Act 1888 for the extension of a Borough.	
Aberdeen Corporation Order Confirmation Act 1928 (repealed)	18 & 19 Geo. 5. c. xxi	2 July 1928
An Act to confirm a Provisional Order under the Private Legislation Procedure (Scotland) Act 1899 relating to Aberdeen Corporation. (Repealed by Aberdeen Corporation (Administration Finance, &c.) Order Confirmation Act 1940 (3 & 4 Geo. 6. c. iii))
	Aberdeen Corporation Order 1928 Provisional Order to redivide the city of Aberdeen into new wards to vary the number of town councillors and parish councillors and for other purposes.	
West Hartlepool (Trolley Vehicles) Order Confirmation Act 1928	18 & 19 Geo. 5. c. xxii	2 July 1928
An Act to confirm a Provisional Order made by the Minister of Transport under the West Hartlepool Corporation Act 1923 (Note: West Hartlepool Corporation Act 1923 (13 & 14 Geo. 5. c. xcv)) relating to West Hartlepool Corporation trolley vehicles.
	West Hartlepool Corporation (Trolley Vehicles) Order 1928 Order authorising the mayor aldermen and burgesses of the borough of West Hartlepool to use trolley vehicles upon routes in the borough of West Hartlepool and in the parish of Seaton.	
Land Drainage (Ouse) Provisional Order Confirmation Act 1928	18 & 19 Geo. 5. c. xxiii	2 July 1928
An Act to confirm a Provisional Order under the Land Drainage Acts 1861 (Note: Land Drainage Act 1861 (24 & 25 Vict. c. 133)) and 1918 (Note: Land Drainage Act 1918 (8 & 9 Geo. 5. c. 17)) amending the Land Drainage (Ouse) Provisional Order Confirmation Act 1920. (Note: Land Drainage (Ouse) Provisional Order Confirmation Act 1920 (10 & 11 Geo. 5. c. cxxii))
	Land Drainage (Ouse) Provisional Order.	
Newquay and District Water Act 1928	18 & 19 Geo. 5. c. xxiv	2 July 1928
An Act to confirm the construction of a well of the Newquay and District Water Company and for other purposes.
South Metropolitan Gas Act 1928	18 & 19 Geo. 5. c. xxv	2 July 1928
An Act to extend the limits of supply of the South Metropolitan Gas Company to increase the capital powers of the Company and for other purposes.
Dartmouth Corporation Act 1928	18 & 19 Geo. 5. c. xxvi	2 July 1928
An Act to empower the mayor aldermen and burgesses of the borough of Clifton Dartmouth Hardness to acquire lands to construct a river wall and new road and to make further provision with regard to markets and the health local government and improvement of the borough and for other purposes.
Hastings Corporation Act 1928	18 & 19 Geo. 5. c. xxvii	2 July 1928
An Act to empower the mayor aldermen and burgesses of the county borough of Hastings to construct additional waterworks and to execute street improvements to make further provision for the improvement and good government of the borough to empower the Corporation to borrow money and for other purposes.
Leeds and Liverpool Canal Act 1928	18 & 19 Geo. 5. c. xxviii	2 July 1928
An Act to make further provision as to the rates tolls dues and charges leviable by the Leeds and Liverpool Canal Company to empower the Company to purchase their debentures and debenture stock and for other purposes.
Oxford Corporation (Water, &c.) Act 1928	18 & 19 Geo. 5. c. xxix	2 July 1928
An Act to empower the mayor aldermen and citizens of Oxford to construct additional waterworks to. confer further financial and other powers upon the Corporation and for other purposes.
Lancashire Quarter Sessions Act 1928 (repealed)	18 & 19 Geo. 5. c. xxx	2 July 1928
An Act to make further provision as to the chairmen of courts of quarter sessions holden for the county palatine of Lancaster and for other purposes. (Repealed by County of Lancashire Act 1984 (c. xxi))
Bermondsey Borough Council (St. Olave's Garden) Act 1928	18 & 19 Geo. 5. c. xxxi	2 July 1928
An Act to authorise the sale of St. Olave's Garden in the Metropolitan Borough of Bermondsey and for other purposes.
Mid Kent Water Act 1928	18 & 19 Geo. 5. c. xxxii	2 July 1928
An Act for authorising the Mid Kent Water Company to acquire lands for the protection of their waterworks for conferring further powers upon the Company and for other purposes.
Great Western Railway (Swansea North Dock Abandonment) Act 1928	18 & 19 Geo. 5. c. xxxiii	2 July 1928
An Act to provide for the abandonment by the Great Western Railway Company of the North Dock Swansea and of a portion of the Swansea Canal and to confer upon the Great Western Railway Company and the Corporation of Swansea powers to acquire lands and to execute works and for other purposes.
Weaver Navigation Act 1928	18 & 19 Geo. 5. c. xxxiv	2 July 1928
An Act for transferring to the Ecclesiastical Commissioners certain churches parsonages and other properties now vested in the Weaver Navigation Trustees to confer further borrowing powers on the Trustees and for other purposes.
Warwick Corporation Act 1928 (repealed)	18 & 19 Geo. 5. c. xxxv	2 July 1928
An Act to empower the mayor aldermen and burgesses of the borough of Warwick to acquire lands to provide for the extinction of the rights of depasturage in Saint Nicholas Meadow to construct a river wall and promenade to make further provision with regard to the water supply health local government and improvement of the borough and for other purposes. (Repealed by Warwick District Council Act 1984 (c.xxiv))
Falmouth Water Act 1928	18 & 19 Geo. 5. c. xxxvi	2 July 1928
An Act to confer further powers on the Falmouth Waterworks Company and for other purposes.
Ystradfelte Water Act 1928	18 & 19 Geo. 5. c. xxxvii	2 July 1928
An Act to merge the several water undertakings of the Neath Rural District Council in one undertaking to confer further powers on the Council with respect to the combined water undertaking and the finances of their district to amend the Ystradfellte Water Acts 1902 (Note: Ystradfellte Water Act 1902 (2 Edw. 7. c. ccxxvii)) and 1912 (Note: Ystradfellte Water Act 1912 (2 & 3 Geo. 5. c. xxxi)) and for other purposes.
Scottish Insurance Companies (Superannuation Fund) Order 1914 (Amendment) Act 1928	18 & 19 Geo. 5. c. xxxviii	2 July 1928
An Act to amend the Scottish Insurance Companies (Superannuation Fund) Order 1914 to alter the constitution of and confer further powers upon the Scottish Insurance Companies Superannuation Fund Committee to alter and extend the benefits provided out of the Scottish Insurance Companies Superannuation Fund and for other purposes.
London County Council (Tramway, Subway and Improvements) Act 1928	18 & 19 Geo. 5. c. xxxix	2 July 1928
An Act to empower the London County Council to enlarge their tramway subway and to reconstruct the tramways therein and adjacent thereto to make street improvements and for other purposes.
Wey Valley Water Act 1928	18 & 19 Geo. 5. c. xl	2 July 1928
An Act to empower the Wey Valley Water Company to construct further works to extend their limits for the supply of water to empower them to raise further capital to confer additional powers upon the Company and for other purposes.
Bethlem Hospital Act 1928	18 & 19 Geo. 5. c. xli	2 July 1928
An Act to enable the Governors of Bethlem Hospital to dispose of portions of their Monks Orchard Estate at Addington in Surrey and Beckenham and West Wickham in Kent.
York Town and Blackwater Gas and Electricity Act 1928	18 & 19 Geo. 5. c. xlii	2 July 1928
An Act to authorise the York Town and Blackwater Gas Company to consolidate and convert the existing capital of the Company and to raise additional capital to change the name of the Company and for other purposes.
Zoological Society of London Act 1928	18 & 19 Geo. 5. c. xliii	2 July 1928
An Act to confer powers upon the Zoological Society of London with reference to certain lands acquired by them in the county of Bedford to provide for the construction of a new bridlepath and the acquisition of land therefor and for other purposes.
London, Midland and Scottish Railway Act 1928	18 & 19 Geo. 5. c. xliv	2 July 1928
An Act to empower the London Midland and Scottish Railway Company to construct a railway and to acquire lands to extend the time for the compulsory purchase of certain lands and for the completion of certain works and for other purposes.
Plympton St. Mary Rural District Council Act 1928	18 & 19 Geo. 5. c. xlv	2 July 1928
An Act to empower the Plympton St. Mary Rural District Council to obtain a supply of water from the river Yealm and its tributaries in the county of Devon to authorise the construction of works and for other purposes.
Lewes Water Act 1928	18 & 19 Geo. 5. c. xlvi	2 July 1928
An Act to confer further powers on and to change the name of the Company of Proprietors of the Lewes Waterworks to extend their limits of supply and for other purposes.
Port of London Act 1928 (repealed)	18 & 19 Geo. 5. c. xlvii	2 July 1928
An Act to increase the borrowing powers of the Port of London Authority to make further provision with regard to superannuation allowances and for other purposes. (Repealed by Port of London Act 1968 (c. xxxii))
Exeter Corporation Act 1928	18 & 19 Geo. 5. c. xlviii	2 July 1928
An Act to authorise the mayor aldermen and citizens of the city of Exeter to construct street works and a tramway to acquire lands for various purposes and to provide and work omnibuses and to confer further powers upon the said mayor aldermen and citizens with regard to their tramways water and electricity undertakings and the health local government and improvement of the city and for other purposes.
Rickmansworth and Uxbridge Valley Water Act 1928	18 & 19 Geo. 5. c. xlix	2 July 1928
An Act to empower the Rickmansworth and Uxbridge Valley Water Company to construct further works and to raise additional capital to confer additional powers upon the Company and for other purposes.
Caerphilly Urban District Council Act 1928	18 & 19 Geo. 5. c. l	2 July 1928
An Act to empower the Caerphilly Urban District Council to construct street works to confer further powers on the Council with respect to their omnibus water and electricity undertakings and the health good government and finances of their district and for other purposes.
Llandudno Urban District Council Act 1928	18 & 19 Geo. 5. c. li	2 July 1928
An Act to empower the Llandudno Urban District Council to run omnibuses to confer further powers on the Council in regard to the supply of water gas and electricity and to make further and better provision for the health local government finance and improvement of the district and for other purposes.
Copyright Order Confirmation (Mechanical Instruments: Royalties) Act 1928 (repealed)	18 & 19 Geo. 5. c. lii	3 August 1928
An Act to confirm a Provisional Order of the Board of Trade relating to the rate of royalties on mechanical contrivances for the performance of musical works. (Repealed by Copyright Act 1956 (4 & 5 Eliz. 2. c. 74))
	Copyright Mechanical Instruments (Royalties) Order 1928 Provisional Order made by the Board of Trade under Section 19 of the Copyright Act 1911 (Note: Copyright Act 1911 (1 & 2 Geo. 5. c. 46)) increasing the rate of royalties on mechanical contrivances for the performance of musical works.	
Ministry of Health Provisional Orders Confirmation (No. 5) Act 1928	18 & 19 Geo. 5. c. liii	3 August 1928
An Act to confirm certain Provisional Orders of the Minister of Health relating to Clacton Great Yarmouth Keighley Bingley and Shipley Joint Hospital District Mexborough Port Talbot and Slough.
	Clacton Order 1928 Provisional Order for altering the Clacton Improvement Act 1905. (Note: Clacton Improvement Act 1905 (5 Edw. 7. c. liv))	
	Great Yarmouth Order 1928 Provisional Order for altering a Local Act. (Note: Great Yarmouth Corporation Act 1897 (60 & 61 Vict. c. cciv))	
	Keighley, Bingley and Shipley Order 1928 Provisional Order for partially repealing certain Confirming Acts and Orders and for other purposes.	
	Mexborough Order 1928 Provisional Order for altering the Mexborough Urban District Council Act 1914. (Note: Mexborough Urban District Council Act 1914 (4 & 5 Geo. 5. c. xliii))	
	Port Talbot Order 1928 Provisional Order to enable the Port Talbot Corporation to put in force the Compulsory Clauses of the Lands Clauses Acts.	
	Slough Order 1928 Provisional Order to enable the Urban District Council of Slough to put in force the Compulsory Clauses of the Lands Clauses Acts.	
Ministry of Health Provisional Orders Confirmation (No. 7) Act 1928	18 & 19 Geo. 5. c. liv	3 August 1928
An Act to confirm certain Provisional Orders of the Minister of Health relating to Amman Valley Joint Sewerage District Barry Bury Leicester Loughborough and Rugby.
	Amman Valley Joint Sewerage Order 1928 Provisional Order for altering a Confirming Act. (Note: Local Government Board's Provisional Orders Confirmation (No. 15) Act 1914 (4 & 5 Geo. 5. c. cxxxv))	
	Barry Order 1928 Provisional Order for altering and amending a Local Act. (Note: Barry Urban District Council Act 1913 (3 & 4 Geo. 5. c. xcix))	
	Bury Order (No. 2) 1928 Provisional Order for altering a Local Act (Note: Bury Corporation Act 1909 (9 Edw. 7. c. clix)) and a Confirming Act. (Note: Ministry of Health Provisional Orders Confirmation (No. 6) Act 1925 (15 & 16 Geo. 5. c. lxxxii))	
	Leicester Order 1928 Provisional Order to enable the Leicester Corporation to put in force the Compulsory Clauses of the Lands Clauses Acts.	
	Loughborough Order 1928 Provisional Order to enable the Loughborough Corporation to put in force the Compulsory Clauses of the Lands Clauses Acts.	
	Rugby Order 1928 Provisional Order for altering and amending certain Local Acts.	
Ministry of Health Provisional Orders Confirmation (No. 8) Act 1928	18 & 19 Geo. 5. c. lv	3 August 1928
An Act to confirm certain Provisional Orders of the Minister of Health relating to Glossop Guildford Leeds Milford Haven South Staffordshire Joint Small-pox Hospital District and Woolwich.
	Glossop Order 1928 Provisional Order for altering the Glossop Waterworks Act 1865. (Note: Glossop Waterworks Act 1865 (28 & 29 Vict. c. cxv))	
	Guildford Order 1928 Provisional Order for altering a Local Act. (Note: Guildford Corporation Act 1886 (49 & 50 Vict. c. cvii))	
	Leeds Order 1928 Provisional Order to enable the Leeds Corporation to put in force the Compulsory Clauses of the Lands Clauses Acts.	
	Milford Haven Order 1928 Provisional Order for altering certain Local Acts and Orders.	
	South Staffordshire Joint Small-pox Hospital Order 1928 Provisional Order for altering certain Orders confirmed by Parliament.	
	Woolwich Order 1928 Provisional Order to enable the Council of the Metropolitan Borough of Woolwich to put in force the Compulsory Clauses of the Lands Clauses Acts.	
Ministry of Health Provisional Orders Confirmation (No. 9) Act 1928	18 & 19 Geo. 5. c. lvi	3 August 1928
An Act to confirm certain Provisional Orders of the Minister of Health relating to Barton-uponIrwell Bollington Bradford Bury Cambridge and Darlington.
	Barton-upon-Irwell Union Order 1928 Provisional Order made in pursuance of subsection (3) of Section 142 of the Poor Law Act 1927. (Note: Poor Law Act 1927 (17 & 18 Geo. 5. c. 14))	
	Bollington Order 1928 Provisional Order for partially repealing and altering the Bollington Improvement and Lighting Act 1862. (Note: Bollington Improvement and Lighting Act 1862 (25 & 26 Vict. c. xxxvii))	
	Bradford Order 1928 Provisional Order for altering and amending certain Local Acts.	
	Bury (Acquisition of Lands) Order 1928 Provisional Order to enable the Bury Corporation to put in force the Compulsory Clauses of the Lands Clauses Acts.	
	Cambridge Order 1928 Provisional Order for partially repealing and altering certain Local Acts and for other purposes.	
	Darlington Order 1928 Provisional Order for altering certain Local Acts and Orders.	
Ministry of Health Provisional Orders Confirmation (No. 10) Act 1928	18 & 19 Geo. 5. c. lvii	3 August 1928
An Act to confirm certain Provisional Orders of the Minister of Health relating to Bury Derby Maryport Somerset and West Riding of Yorkshire.
	Bury Order 1928 Provisional Order for altering a Local Act. (Note: Bury Corporation Act 1909 (9 Edw. 7. c. clix))	
	Derby Order 1928 Provisional Order for partially repealing a Confirming Act. (Note: Ministry of Health Provisional Orders Confirmation (No. 7) Act 1920 (10 & 11 Geo. 5. c. cxiv))	
	Maryport Order 1928 Provisional Order for partially repealing altering and amending certain local Acts and confirmation Acts.	
	County of Somerset Order 1928 Provisional Order to enable the County Council of Somerset to put in force the Compulsory Clauses of the Lands Clauses Acts.	
	County of the West Riding of Yorkshire Order 1928 Provisional Order made in pursuance of Sections 69 (2) and 87 of the Local Government Act 1888.	
Ministry of Health Provisional Orders Confirmation (No. 11) Act 1928	18 & 19 Geo. 5. c. lviii	3 August 1928
An Act to confirm certain Provisional Orders of the Minister of Health relating to Bedwellty Brighton Mid-Glamorgan Water Board Scarborough Stafford and Swansea.
	Bedwellty Order 1928 Provisional Order for altering certain Local Acts.	
	Brighton Order 1928 Provisional Order for altering the Brighton Corporation Act 1900. (Note: Brighton Corporation Act 1900 (63 & 64 Vict. c. xcix))	
	Mid-Glamorgan Water Order 1928 Provisional Order for altering and amending the Mid-Glamorgan Water Acts 1920 (Note: Mid-Glamorgan Water Act 1920 (10 & 11 Geo. 5. c. cxxvii)) and 1925. (Note: Mid-Glamorgan Water Act 1925 (15 & 16 Geo. 5. c. xcix))	
	Scarborough Order 1928 Provisional Order for altering the Scarborough Improvement Act 1889. (Note: Scarborough Improvement Act 1889 (52 & 53 Vict. c. clxiv))	
	Stafford Order 1928 Provisional Order for partially repealing and altering the Stafford Corporation Act 1876. (Note: Stafford Corporation Act 1876 (39 & 40 Vict. c. cxcvi))	
	Swansea Order 1928 Provisional Order for altering the Swansea Corporation Act 1912. (Note: Swansea Corporation Act 1912 (2 & 3 Geo. 5. c. xcix))	
Ministry of Health Provisional Order Confirmation (Worthing Extension) Act 1928	18 & 19 Geo. 5. c. lix	3 August 1928
An Act to confirm a Provisional Order of the Minister of Health relating to Worthing.
	Worthing (Extension) Order 1928 Provisional Order made in pursuance of the Local Government Act 1888 for the extension of a Borough.	
Ministry of Health Provisional Order Confirmation (Gillingham Extension) Act 1928 (repealed)	18 & 19 Geo. 5. c. lx	3 August 1928
An Act to confirm a Provisional Order of the Minister of Health relating to Gillingham. (Repealed by County of Kent Act 1981 (c. xviii))
	Borough of Gillingham (Extension) Order 1928 Provisional Order made in pursuance of the Local Government Act 1888 for the extension of a Borough.	
Ministry of Health Provisional Order Confirmation (Swindon Extension) Act 1928	18 & 19 Geo. 5. c. lxi	3 August 1928
An Act to confirm a Provisional Order of the Minister of Health relating to Swindon.
	Swindon (Extension) Order 1928 Provisional Order made in pursuance of the Local Government Act 1888 for the extension of a Borough.	
Ministry of Health Provisional Order Confirmation (Godalming Extension) Act 1928 (repealed)	18 & 19 Geo. 5. c. lxii	3 August 1928
An Act to confirm a Provisional Order of the Minister of Health relating to Godalming. (Repealed by Surrey Act 1985 (c.iii))
	Godalming (Extension) Order 1928 Provisional Order made in pursuance of the Local Government Act 1888 for the extension of a Borough.	
Ministry of Health (Halifax and West Riding Provisional Orders) Confirmation Act 1928 (repealed)	18 & 19 Geo. 5. c. lxiii	3 August 1928
An Act to confirm certain Provisional Orders of the Minister of Health relating to Halifax and the West Riding of Yorkshire. (Repealed by West Yorkshire Act 1980 (c. xiv))
	Halifax (Extension) Order 1928 Provisional Order made in pursuance of the Local Government Act 1888 for the extension of the County Borough of Halifax by the addition of a part of the Urban District of Southowram in the West Riding of Yorkshire.	
	West Riding of Yorkshire Order 1928 Provisional Order made in pursuance of the Local Government Act 1888 for the transfer of a part of the County Borough of Halifax to the County of the West Riding of Yorkshire and the Urban District of Sowerby.	
Ministry of Health Provisional Order Confirmation (Richmond (Surrey)) Act 1928	18 & 19 Geo. 5. c. lxiv	3 August 1928
An Act to confirm a Provisional Order of the Minister of Health relating to Richmond (Surrey).
	Richmond (Surrey) Poor Law Order 1928 Provisional Order for repealing in part the local Act 25 George III. Chapter 41. (Note: Richmond (Poor Relief, etc.) Act 1785 (25 Geo. 3. c. 41))	
Chesterfield Corporation (Trolley Vehicles) Order Confirmation Act 1928	18 & 19 Geo. 5. c. lxv	3 August 1928
An Act to confirm a Provisional Order made by the Minister of Transport under the Chesterfield Corporation Act, 1923, relating to Chesterfield Corporation Trolley Vehicles.
	Chesterfield Corporation (Trolley Vehicles) Order 1928	
Bradford Corporation (Trolley Vehicles) Order Confirmation Act 1928 (repealed)	18 & 19 Geo. 5. c. lxvi	3 August 1928
An Act to confirm a Provisional Order made by the Minister of Transport under the Bradford Corporation Act 1910 (Note: Bradford Corporation Act 1910 (10 Edw. 7 & 1 Geo. 5. c. cxvii)) relating to Bradford Corporation trolley vehicles. (Repealed by West Yorkshire Act 1980 (c. xiv))
	Bradford Corporation (Trolley Vehicles) Order 1928 Order authorising the lord mayor aldermen and citizens of the city of Bradford to provide maintain and use trolley vehicles upon additional routes in and beyond the said city.	
Lincolnshire Rivers Fisheries Provisional Order Confirmation Act 1928	18 & 19 Geo. 5. c. lxvii	3 August 1928
An Act to confirm a Provisional Order under the Salmon and Freshwater Fisheries Act 1923 (Note: Salmon and Freshwater Fisheries Act 1923 (13 & 14 Geo. 5. c. 16)) relating to the Rivers Witham Welland Trent and other waters.
	Lincolnshire Rivers Trent and Welland Fishery Districts Order 1928 Order constituting the Lincolnshire Rivers Fishery District and altering the areas of the Trent and Welland Fishery Districts.	
Pier and Harbour Orders Confirmation Act 1928	18 & 19 Geo. 5. c. lxviii	3 August 1928
An Act to confirm certain Provisional Orders made by the Minister of Transport under the General Pier and Harbour Act 1861 (Note: General Pier and Harbour Act 1861 (24 & 25 Vict. c. 45)) relating to Gott Bay and Truro.
	Gott Bay Pier (Amendment) Order 1928 Provisional Order to amend the Gott Bay Pier Order 1908.	
	Truro Harbour Order 1928 Provisional Order for the amendment of the Truro Harbour Orders 1883 to 1920 and for conferring further powers upon the mayor aldermen and citizens of the city of Truro in the county of Cornwall in relation to Truro Harbour.	
Bridlington Harbour Confirmation Act 1928	18 & 19 Geo. 5. c. lxix	3 August 1928
An Act to confirm a Provisional Order made by the Minister of Agriculture and Fisheries under the Fishery Harbours Act 1915 (Note: Fishery Harbours Act 1915 (5 & 6 Geo. 5. c. 48)) relating to Bridlington Harbour.
	Bridlington Harbour Order 1928 Order of the Minister of Agriculture and Fisheries to empower the Commissioners of the Piers and Harbour of Bridlington to increase the dues rates and charges in respect of Bridlington Harbour to borrow money and for other purposes.	
Windermere District Gas and Water Act 1928	18 & 19 Geo. 5. c. lxx	3 August 1928
An Act to empower the Windermere District Gas and Water Company to acquire and construct waterworks to extend their limits for the supply of water to authorise them to raise additional capital to confer additional powers upon the Company and for other purposes.
Bury and District Joint Water Board Act 1928	18 & 19 Geo. 5. c. lxxi	3 August 1928
An Act to extend the time for the completion of works authorised by the Bury and District Joint Water Board Act 1903 (Note: Bury and District Joint Water Board Act 1903 (3 Edw. 7. c. ccxxxiv)) to confer further powers on the Board and for other purposes.
Middlesex and Surrey (Thames Bridges, &c.) Act 1928 (repealed)	18 & 19 Geo. 5. c. lxxii	3 August 1928
An Act to empower the county councils of the administrative counties of Middlesex and Surrey to construct bridges across the river Thames and other works to vest the Richmond Bridge in the said county councils to confer further powers upon them and for other purposes. (Repealed by Middlesex County Council Act 1944 (7 & 8 Geo. 6. c. xxi))
Gloucester Corporation Act 1928	18 & 19 Geo. 5. c. lxxiii	3 August 1928
An Act to empower the mayor aldermen and citizens of the city of Gloucester in the county of the city of Gloucester to provide and work trolley vehicles and omnibuses to increase certain market and fair tolls and charges and for other purposes.
Sandown Urban District Council Act 1928	18 & 19 Geo. 5. c. lxxiv	3 August 1928
An Act to provide for the transfer of the undertaking of the Isle of Wight Waterworks Company to the urban district council of Sandown to authorise that Council to supply water in and in the neighbourhood of their district to provide for the transfer of parts of the said undertaking when acquired by the said Council to the Shanklin Urban District Council and the Isle of Wight Rural District Council and for other purposes.
Staffordshire Potteries Water Board Act 1928	18 & 19 Geo. 5. c. lxxv	3 August 1928
An Act to confer further powers upon the Staffordshire Potteries Water Board to empower the Board to construct a further waterwork and to acquire lands to revive the powers for the construction of certain waterworks by the Board to make provision for the preservation and protection of the Board's sources of water supply to amend the Acts of the Board and for other purposes.
Cleethorpes Urban District Council Act 1928 (repealed)	18 & 19 Geo. 5. c. lxxvi	3 August 1928
An Act to make provision for the working of tramways and trolley vehicles by the urban district council of Cleethorpes to empower the Council to run omnibuses to confer further powers on them in regard to the supply of electricity and the management of public walks and pleasure grounds to authorise them to purchase the Cleethorpes Pier and Gardens and to make further and better provision for the health local government finance and improvement of their district and for other purposes. (Repealed by Humberside Act 1982 (c. iii))
London County Council (General Powers) Act 1928 (repealed)	18 & 19 Geo. 5. c. lxxvii	3 August 1928
An Act to confer further powers upon the London County Council and upon the corporation of the city of London and metropolitan borough councils and for other purposes. (Repealed by Greater London Council (General Powers) Act 1979 (c. xxiii))
South West Suburban Water Act 1928	18 & 19 Geo. 5. c. lxxviii	3 August 1928
An Act to authorise the South West Suburban Water Company to take additional water from the river Thames and to raise additional capital to extend the Company's limits of supply and for other purposes.
South Essex Waterworks Act 1928	18 & 19 Geo. 5. c. lxxix	3 August 1928
An Act to authorise the South Essex Waterworks Company to construct new works and to raise additional capital to extend the limits of supply of the Company and for other purposes.
South Suburban Gas Act 1928	18 & 19 Geo. 5. c. lxxx	3 August 1928
An Act to consolidate the Acts applying to the South Suburban Gas Company to make new provisions as to the charges for the gas supplied by and the application of the profits of the Company to extend their limits of supply to authorise the Company to acquire additional lands and for other purposes.
Maidenhead Water Act 1928	18 & 19 Geo. 5. c. lxxxi	3 August 1928
An Act to extend the limits of supply of the Maidenhead Waterworks Company to authorise and confirm the construction of certain new and existing works to increase the capital and borrowing powers of the Company and for other purposes.
Greenock and Port Glasgow Tramways Company Act 1928	18 & 19 Geo. 5. c. lxxxii	3 August 1928
An Act to make provision as to the abandonment of the tramways owned or worked by the Greenock and Port Glasgow Tramways Company to authorise the Company to run omnibuses in substitution for tramcars on the routes of the said tramways and otherwise to enlarge their powers of running omnibuses to change the name of the Company to reduce the existing capital of the Company and to authorise them to raise additional capital and for other purposes.
Tottenham and District Gas Act 1928	18 & 19 Geo. 5. c. lxxxiii	3 August 1928
An Act to provide for the transfer of the undertaking of the Waltham and Cheshunt Gas Company to the Tottenham District Light Heat and Power Company and to confer on such Company further powers in regard to the supply of gas and for other purposes.
Oxford Extension Act 1928 (repealed)	18 & 19 Geo. 5. c. lxxxiv	3 August 1928
An Act to extend the boundaries of the city of Oxford and for other purposes. (Repealed by Oxfordshire Act 1985 (c. xxxiv))
Manchester Ship Canal Act 1928 (repealed)	18 & 19 Geo. 5. c. lxxxv	3 August 1928
An Act to confer powers on the Manchester Ship Canal Company and for other purposes. (Repealed by Manchester Ship Canal Harbour Revision Order 2009 (SI 2009/2579))
Bournemouth Gas and Water Act 1928	18 & 19 Geo. 5. c. lxxxvi	3 August 1928
An Act to extend the limits for the supply of gas of the Bournemouth Gas and Water Company to increase the capital and borrowing powers of the Company to authorise and confirm the construction of certain works and for other purposes.
Sheffield Corporation Act 1928	18 & 19 Geo. 5. c. lxxxvii	3 August 1928
An Act to extend the boundaries of the city of Sheffield to authorise the Corporation of that city to construct street improvements and additional tramways to confer further powers upon them with respect to their tramways waterworks electricity and markets undertakings to make better provision for the health local government and finance of the city and for other purposes.
Shropshire, Worcestershire and Staffordshire Electric Power Act 1928 (repealed)	18 & 19 Geo. 5. c. lxxxviii	3 August 1928
An Act to confer further powers on the Shropshire Worcestershire and Staffordshire Electric Power Company and for other purposes. (Repealed by Shropshire, Worcestershire and Staffordshire Electric Power (Consolidation) Act 1938 (1 & 2 Geo. 6. c. lviii))
Stretford and District Electricity Board Act 1928	18 & 19 Geo. 5. c. lxxxix	3 August 1928
An Act to constitute and incorporate a Joint Board consisting of representatives of the urban district councils of Stretford and Urmston and the rural district council of Barton-upon-Irwell and to vest in such Board the electricity undertaking of the Stretford Urban District Council and the undertaking of the Barton and Urmston Electricity Board and for other purposes.
Wessex Electricity Act 1928	18 & 19 Geo. 5. c. xc	3 August 1928
An Act to extend the limits of supply and increase the capital of the Wessex Electricity Company and for other purposes.
Dover Harbour Act 1928 (repealed)	18 & 19 Geo. 5. c. xci	3 August 1928
An Act to authorise the closing and stopping up of certain public roads in the borough of Dover to sanction and confirm the construction of a railway and for other purposes. (Repealed by Dover Harbour Act 1953 (1 & 2 Eliz. 2. c. xxix))
London County Council (Ilford and Barking Drainage) Act 1928	18 & 19 Geo. 5. c. xcii	3 August 1928
An Act to make provision with respect to the admission into the London main drainage system of sewage and drainage from the borough of Ilford and the urban district of Barking Town.
Nottinghamshire and Derbyshire Traction Act 1928 (repealed)	18 & 19 Geo. 5. c. xciii	3 August 1928
An Act to authorise the Nottinghamshire and Derbyshire Tramways Company to run trolley vehicles in substitution for their tramway services and to provide and run omnibuses to change the name of the Company and for other purposes. (Repealed by Statute Law (Repeals) Act 1995 (c. 44))
Dover Gas Act 1928	18 & 19 Geo. 5. c. xciv	3 August 1928
An Act to make new provisions as to the charges for gas supplied by and the application of the profits of the Dover Gas Company to empower the Company to convert and consolidate the capital of the Company to provide for the establishment of a profit-sharing scheme for the benefit of the employees of the Company and for other purposes.
Accrington Corporation Act 1928	18 & 19 Geo. 5. c. xcv	3 August 1928
An Act to extend the boundaries of the borough of Accrington to empower the Corporation to provide and work trolley vehicles and omnibuses to acquire lands and execute street works to make further provision with respect to their tramways trolley vehicles omnibus and electricity undertakings and the health local government and improvement of the borough and for other purposes.
Colne Valley Water Act 1928	18 & 19 Geo. 5. c. xcvi	3 August 1928
An Act for authorising the Colne Valley Water Company to raise additional capital and for other purposes.
London County Council (Money) Act 1928 (repealed)	18 & 19 Geo. 5. c. xcvii	3 August 1928
An Act to regulate the expenditure on capital account and lending of money by the London County Council during the financial period from the first day of April one thousand nine hundred and twenty-eight to the thirtieth day of September one thousand nine hundred and twenty-nine and for other purposes. (Repealed by London County Council (Loans) Act 1955 (4 & 5 Eliz. 2. c. xxvi))
Regent's Canal and Dock Company (Grand Junction Canal Purchase) Act 1928	18 & 19 Geo. 5. c. xcviii	3 August 1928
An Act to provide for the transfer to the Regent's Canal and Dock Company of the canal undertaking of the Company of Proprietors of the Grand Junction Canal to confer various powers upon the Regent's Canal and Dock Company and for other purposes.
Regent's Canal and Dock Company (Warwick Canals Purchase) Act 1928	18 & 19 Geo. 5. c. xcix	3 August 1928
An Act to provide for the transfer to the Regent's Canal and Dock Company of the undertakings of the Company of Proprietors of the Warwick and Birmingham Canal Navigation the Company of Proprietors of the Warwick and Napton Canal Navigation and the Company of Proprietors of the Birmingham and Warwick Junction Canal Navigation and the dissolution of those Companies and for other purposes.
Stoke-on-Trent Corporation Act 1928	18 & 19 Geo. 5. c. c	3 August 1928
An Act to confer further powers upon the lord mayor aldermen and citizens of the city of Stoke-on-Trent with respect to lands and their electricity undertaking with respect to the establishment of an insurance fund to make better provision for the control of traffic within and the health local government and improvement of the city and for other purposes.
London, Midland and Scottish Railway (Road Transport) Act 1928 (repealed)	18 & 19 Geo. 5. c. ci	3 August 1928
An Act to empower the London Midland and Scottish Railway Company to provide road transport services and for other purposes. (Repealed by Railways Act 1993 (c. 43))
Great Western Railway (Road Transport) Act 1928 (repealed)	18 & 19 Geo. 5. c. cii	3 August 1928
An Act to empower the Great Western Railway Company to provide road transport services and for other purposes. (Repealed by Railways Act 1993 (c. 43))
London and North Eastern Railway (Road Transport) Act 1928 (repealed)	18 & 19 Geo. 5. c. ciii	3 August 1928
An Act to empower the London and North Eastern Railway Company to provide road transport services and for other purposes. (Repealed by Railways Act 1993 (c. 43))
Southern Railway (Road Transport) Act 1928 (repealed)	18 & 19 Geo. 5. c. civ	3 August 1928
An Act to empower the Southern Railway Company to provide road transport services and for other purposes. (Repealed by Railways Act 1993 (c. 43))
Dudley Corporation Act 1928 (repealed)	18 & 19 Geo. 5. c. cv	3 August 1928
An Act to extend the boundaries of the borough of Dudley to authorise the mayor aldermen and burgesses of the borough to execute street works to confer further powers upon the Corporation with regard to the health local government and improvement of the borough and for other purposes. (Repealed by Dudley Corporation Act 1969 (c. liii))
Bridgwater Corporation Act 1928	18 & 19 Geo. 5. c. cvi	3 August 1928
An Act to extend the boundaries of the borough of Bridgwater to empower the Corporation to acquire lands and execute street works and waterworks and to confer further powers upon the Corporation of the said borough in regard to their water and markets undertakings and the health local government and improvement of the borough and for other purposes.
Whitby Water Act 1928	18 & 19 Geo. 5. c. cvii	3 August 1928
An Act to authorise the Whitby Waterworks Company to construct new works and to raise additional capital for increasing the charges of the Company and for other purposes.
Southampton Corporation Act 1928	18 & 19 Geo. 5. c. cviii	3 August 1928
An Act to provide for the transfer to the mayor aldermen and burgesses of the borough of Southampton of the undertaking of the Company of Proprietors of the Northam Bridge and Roads to authorise the said mayor aldermen and burgesses to purchase the undertaking of the Southampton and Itchen Floating Bridge and Roads Company and to construct a tramway and for other purposes.
Wolverhampton Corporation Act 1928 (repealed)	18 & 19 Geo. 5. c. cix	3 August 1928
An Act to empower the mayor aldermen and burgesses of the. county borough of Wolverhampton to purchase certain tramways and light railways and to confer further powers upon them with regard to the provision and working of trolley vehicles and omnibuses along the routes of such tramways and light railways and on other routes to authorise the Corporation and the Cannock Rural District Council to construct street works and to acquire lands for those and other purposes to extend the area of supply for electricity by the Corporation and to empower them to purchase part of the undertaking of the Midland Electric Corporation for Power Distribution Limited to make further provision with regard to the water undertaking of the Corporation and the health local government and improvement of the borough and for other purposes. (Repealed by Wolverhampton Corporation Act 1969 (c. lx))
Coventry Corporation Act 1928	18 & 19 Geo. 5. c. cx	3 August 1928
An Act to empower the mayor aldermen and citizens of the city of Coventry to construct waterworks street works an improvement of the river Sherbourne and an extension of the Corporation's new cemetery and for other purposes.
Rotherham Corporation Act 1928	18 & 19 Geo. 5. c. cxi	3 August 1928
An Act to empower the mayor aldermen and burgesses of the county borough of Rotherham to construct street improvements and to acquire and utilise lands at Herringthorpe in and adjoining the borough to confer further powers upon them with regard to their tramway trolley vehicle omnibus electricity gas and water undertakings to make further provision with regard to the health local government and improvement of the borough and for other purposes.
Blackpool Improvement Act 1928	18 & 19 Geo. 5. c. cxii	3 August 1928
An Act to confer powers upon the mayor aldermen and burgesses of the borough of Blackpool relative to the acquisition of lands the construction of street improvements the provision of an aerodrome and other matters and to make further provision with respect to the health local government and improvement of the borough and for other purposes.
Weald Electricity Supply Company Act 1928	18 & 19 Geo. 5. c. cxiii	3 August 1928
An Act to authorise the Weald Electricity Supply Company Limited to purchase and the Crowborough District Gas and Electricity Company to sell the electricity part of the undertaking of that company to extend the area of supply of the Weald Electricity Supply Company Limited and to confer further powers on that company with regard to the supply of electricity to empower the Crowborough District Gas and Electricity Company to raise further capital and for other purposes.
Poole Corporation Act 1928 (repealed)	18 & 19 Geo. 5. c. cxiv	3 August 1928
An Act to. empower the mayor aldermen and burgesses of the borough of Poole to provide and work omnibuses to make further provision with regard to the supply of water and the health local government and improvement of the borough and for other purposes. (Repealed by Poole Borough Council Act 1986 (c. i))
Cleveland and Durham County Electric Power Act 1928	18 & 19 Geo. 5. c. cxv	3 August 1928
An Act to confer powers upon the Cleveland and Durham County Electric Power Company with reference to the supply of electricity in parts of the east north and west ridings of York and in the city of York and part of the county of Durham and further powers with reference to such supply in their existing area of supply and for other purposes.
Bradford Corporation Act 1928	18 & 19 Geo. 5. c. cxvi	3 August 1928
An Act to confer powers upon the lord mayor aldermen and citizens of the city of Bradford with reference to tramways and the running of omnibuses and to certain of their undertakings to authorise them to construct waterworks and acquire lands to make further provisions for the health and good government of the city and for other purposes.
Dagenham Urban District Council Act 1928 (repealed)	18 & 19 Geo. 5. c. cxvii	3 August 1928
An Act to empower the urban district council of Dagenham to acquire lands for the purposes of public walks and pleasure grounds and cemeteries and for other purposes. (Repealed by Local Law (North East London Boroughs) Order 1965 (SI 1965/510))
North Metropolitan Electric Power Supply (Consolidation) Act 1928	18 & 19 Geo. 5. c. cxviii	3 August 1928
An Act to consolidate the North Metropolitan Electric Power Supply Acts 1900 to 1927.
Morecambe Corporation Act 1928	18 & 19 Geo. 5. c. cxix	3 August 1928
An Act to alter the boundary of the borough of Morecambe so as to include the urban district of Heysham to empower the Corporation to construct sea walls promenades and other works to acquire portions of Morecambe Harbour and for other purposes.

=== Private and personal acts ===
Short title	Citation	Royal assent
Long title
Goldsmid Estate Act 1928	18 & 19 Geo. 5. c. 1 Pr.	3 August 1928
An Act to enable Osmond Elim d'Abigdor Goldsmid to surrender his equitable life interest in the Goldsmid Settled Estates or in parts thereof to the persons entitled in remainder or reversion expectant on his death notwithstanding a provision for cesser on alienation of such life interest contained in the settlement of the said estates and to facilitate the re-settlement of those estates.

== 19 & 20 Geo. 5 ==
The fifth session of the 34th Parliament of the United Kingdom, which met from 6 November 1928 until 10 May 1929.

This session was also traditionally cited as 19 & 20 G. 5.

=== Public general acts ===
Short title	Citation	Royal assent
Long title
Unemployment Insurance Act 1928 (repealed)	19 & 20 Geo. 5. c. 1	28 November 1928
An Act to provide that, for the purpose of the power of the Treasury to make advances to the Unemployment Fund during the period ending on the thirty-first day of December, one thousand nine hundred and thirty, the total amount of the advances which may be outstanding during the deficiency period shall be increased to forty million pounds. (Repealed by Unemployment Insurance (No. 2) Act 1930 (20 & 21 Geo. 5. c. 19))
Consolidated Fund (No. 1) Act 1928 (Session 2) (repealed)	19 & 20 Geo. 5. c. 2	19 December 1928
An Act to apply a sum out of the Consolidated Fund to the service of the year ending on the thirty-first day of March, one thousand nine hundred and twenty-nine. (Repealed by Statute Law Revision Act 1950 (14 Geo. 6. c. 6))
Expiring Laws Continuance Act 1928 (repealed)	19 & 20 Geo. 5. c. 3	19 December 1928
An Act to continue certain expiring laws. (Repealed by Statute Law Revision Act 1950 (14 Geo. 6. c. 6))
Electricity (Supply) Act 1928 (repealed)	19 & 20 Geo. 5. c. 4	19 December 1928
An Act to amend section sixteen of the Electricity (Supply) Act, 1919. (Note: Electricity (Supply) Act 1919 (9 & 10 Geo. 5. c. 100)) (Repealed by Electricity Act 1947 (10 & 11 Geo. 6. c. 54))
Public Works Loans Act 1928 (repealed)	19 & 20 Geo. 5. c. 5	19 December 1928
An Act to grant money for the purpose of certain local loans out of the local loans fund, and for other purposes relating to local loans. (Repealed by Statute Law Revision Act 1950 (14 Geo. 6. c. 6))
Western Highlands and Islands (Transport Services) Act 1928	19 & 20 Geo. 5. c. 6	19 December 1928
An Act to enable a railway company to participate in the provision of mail cargo and passenger services in the Western Highlands and Islands of Scotland.

=== Local acts ===
Short title	Citation	Royal assent
Long title
Coatbridge Drainage Order Confirmation Act 1928	19 & 20 Geo. 5. c. i	28 November 1928
An Act to confirm a Provisional Order under the Private Legislation Procedure (Scotland) Act 1899 (Note: Private Legislation Procedure (Scotland) Act 1899 (62 & 63 Vict. c. 47)) relating to Coatbridge Drainage.
	Coatbridge Drainage Order 1928 Provisional Order to extend the time for the completion of certain works authorised by the Coatbridge Drainage and Burgh Extension Order 1914 to sanction and confirm the construction of a certain work by the Coatbridge Town Council and to sanction the expenditure of money thereon to make provision with respect to assessments which the Town Council may levy and for other purposes.	
Perth Corporation Order Confirmation Act 1928	19 & 20 Geo. 5. c. ii	19 December 1928
An Act to confirm a Provisional Order under the Private Legislation Procedure (Scotland) Act 1899 relating to Perth Corporation.
	Perth Corporation Order 1928 Provisional Order to provide for the abandonment of tramways and make further provisions as to omnibuses and for other purposes.	
Ministry of Health Provisional Order Confirmation (No. 6) Act 1928	19 & 20 Geo. 5. c. iii	19 December 1928
An Act to confirm a Provisional Order of the Minister of Health relating to West Surrey Water.
	West Surrey Water Order 1928 Provisional Order under the Gas and Water Works Facilities Act 1870 (Note: Gas and Water Works Facilities Act 1870 (33 & 34 Vict. c. 70)) and the Gas and Water Works Facilities Act 1870 Amendment Act 1873 (Note: Gas and Water Works Facilities Act 1870 Amendment Act 1873 (36 & 37 Vict. c. 89)) for empowering the West Surrey Water Company to acquire hold and use lands to extend the limits of supply and for other purposes.	
Bognor Urban District Council Act 1928	19 & 20 Geo. 5. c. iv	19 December 1928
An Act to transfer to and vest in the Bognor Urban District Council the undertaking of the Bognor Water Company and to make further and better provision for the health local government finance and improvement of the district and for other purposes.

== See also ==
- List of acts of the Parliament of the United Kingdom
