= SIRVA =

American moving industry holding company

SIRVA, Inc.
- Type: Private
- Industry: Mobility
- Founded: 1998; 28 years ago
- Headquarters: Oakbrook Terrace, Illinois, U.S.
- Area served: Worldwide
- Products: Relocation and Moving Services
- Website: sirva.com

SIRVA, Inc. (formerly Allied Worldwide), based in Oakbrook Terrace, Illinois, is a privately owned American moving industry holding company which resulted from the merger of Allied Van Lines with North American Van Lines. The corporate name was coined from the Latin word servire, "to serve."

The company was formed in 1999 when private equity company Clayton, Dubilier & Rice merged its Allied and North American businesses. In 2002, it traded on the New York Stock Exchange under its new SIRVA name with the ticker symbol of "SIR."

"In 2024 SIRVA has a downgraded credit rating from S&P Global, with a very negative outlook regarding its financial stability and long term debt." Source:

== History ==
In 1998, Clayton, Dubilier & Rice formed SIRVA to acquire North American Van Lines, Inc., one of the largest U.S. moving services companies, from Norfolk Southern Corporation. In 1999, the firm bought the Allied and Pickfords businesses from NFC plc and was renamed Allied Worldwide. Several acquisitions followed in 2002 and 2003. Seeing a trend of corporate customers outsourcing all aspects of employee relocation, including household goods moves, the firm acquired the relocation services business of Cooperative Resource Services (CRS) in May 2002, and later that year bought Rowan Simmons in the UK. In 2003, it opened an office in Hong Kong and acquired PRS Europe of Belgium. SIRVA is unusual in that it includes both relocation and moving companies under its umbrella; its main competitors are one or the other.

On February 11, 2002 Allied Worldwide was renamed to SIRVA, Inc. The company announced its initial public offering, and its common shares became listed on the New York Stock Exchange under the symbol "SIR". During its first year as a public company in 2003, it reported operations in 40 countries with over 7,700 employees. Its network of service providers operated in 175 countries. It had revenue of $2.35 billion and assets of $1.55 billion. It provided services to 38% of the Fortune 500 companies, among 2,500 corporate clients worldwide. It had 760 moving agents; these agents had a fleet size of 7,800 vehicles. During February 2008, the company entered bankruptcy and re-organized, emerging in May 2008 as a private company.

During 2011, the firm acquired Peninsular Properties in Hong Kong, a real estate company providing a full range of destination services. During 2012, it acquired Concept Mobility Services, a São Paulo, Brazil-based relocation and move management company. During 2013, it opened an office in Doha, Qatar under the brand Allied Pickfords.

== SIRVA brands ==
Allied and North American Van Lines

SIRVA, Inc. is a combination of businesses with a long history. Allied Van Lines (AVL) was founded in 1928 and North American Van Lines (NAVL) was founded in 1933. Beginning in late 1964, NAVL created its STI (Specialized Transportation Inc.)|High Value Products Division (HVPD), which later was bought out from SIRVA and taken private as an independent company named Specialized Transportation Inc.

On November 21, 1999, Clayton, Dubilier & Rice also completed their acquisition of Allied Van Lines and merged it with North American Van Lines to create 'Allied Worldwide, although each former company maintained its own profile names. Valued at approximately US$450 million in the merger, the combined entity became the world's largest relocation and van line logistics company.

Other events

On October 11, 2004, a group of 43 North American Van Lines' agents, named the Specialized Transportation Agent Group Inc., purchased NAVL's High Value Products Division from SIRVA. The buyers renamed the new company Specialized Transportation Inc. (STI). On August 1, 2005, SIRVA sold its warehouse operation business to Lake Capital, a banking company. The business was named NAL Worldwide, a limited liability company in order to be a familiar sound to previous customers and anyone familiar with the old North American Logistics. NAL is chiefly involved in warehousing operations and logistics.

== See also ==
- NorthStar Moving
