= Pickfords =

UK moving company

- Industry: Integrated Transport Logistics
- Founded: c. 1646
- Headquarters: London, England

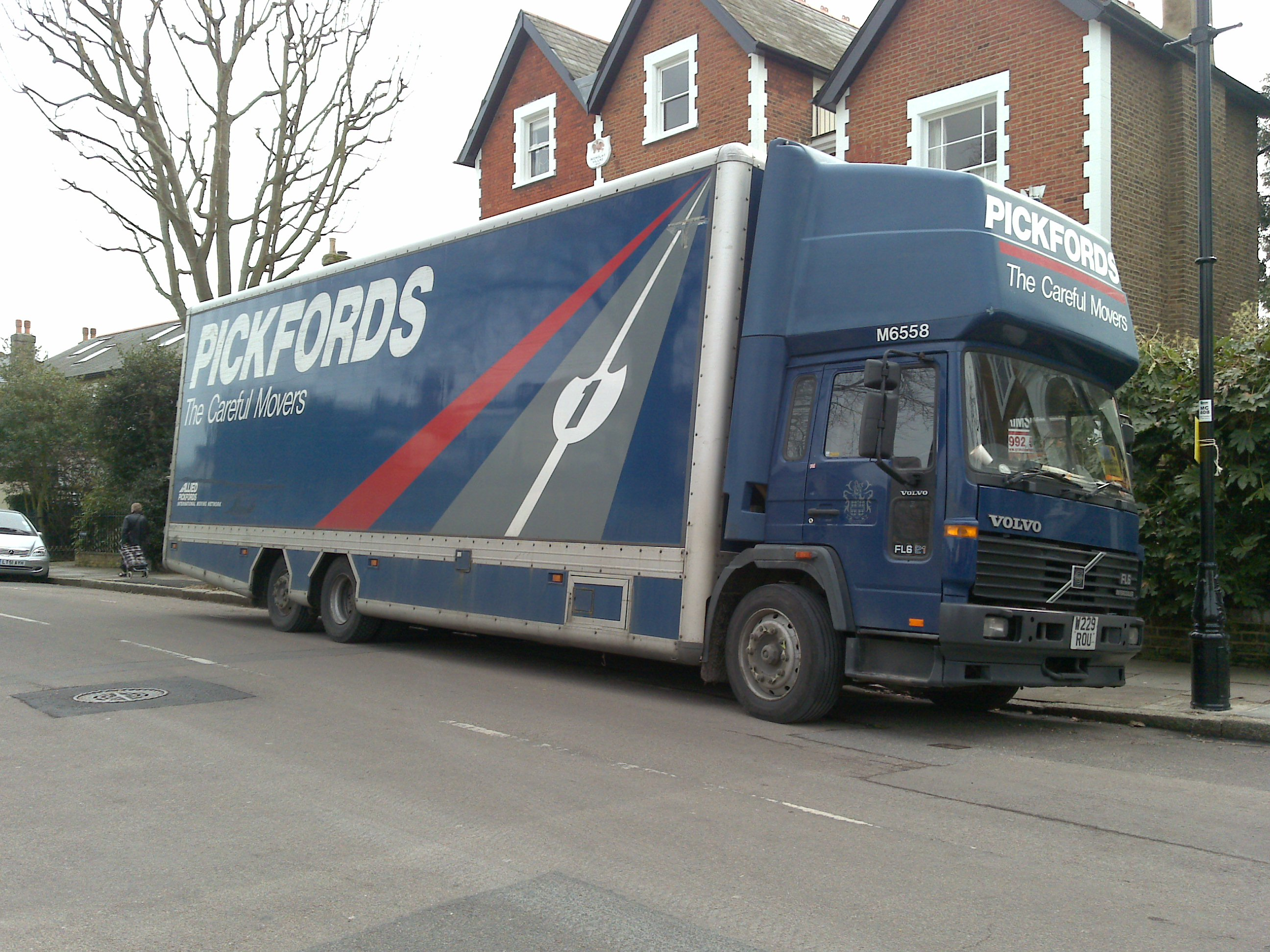
Pickford's Volvo FL614 van

Pickfords is a moving company based in the United Kingdom, part of Pickfords Move Management Ltd.

The business is believed to have been founded in the 17th century, making it one of the UK's oldest functioning companies, although the similar Shore Porters Society was founded earlier. The earliest record is of a William Pickford, a carrier who worked south of Manchester in 1630. In 1646, a north-country yeoman by the name of Thomas Pickford had his lands confiscated by Parliament for gun-running and supporting the Cavaliers during the English Civil War. Pickfords is mentioned by Charles Dickens in Our Mutual Friend, book 4, chapter 12: 'The [police station] sanctuary was not a permanent abiding-place, but a kind of criminal Pickford's.'

Pickfords has branches throughout the UK and Ireland. The company provides services including moving within the UK, moving to Europe and further overseas, business moving, transition and project management, employee moving services, small moves and packing materials. Pickfords Removals (South Africa) operates independently from Pickfords UK w Additional sales offices are based throughout the country. Both Pickfords UK and Pickfords South Africa form part of the Allied International Moving Network.

== Corporate history ==
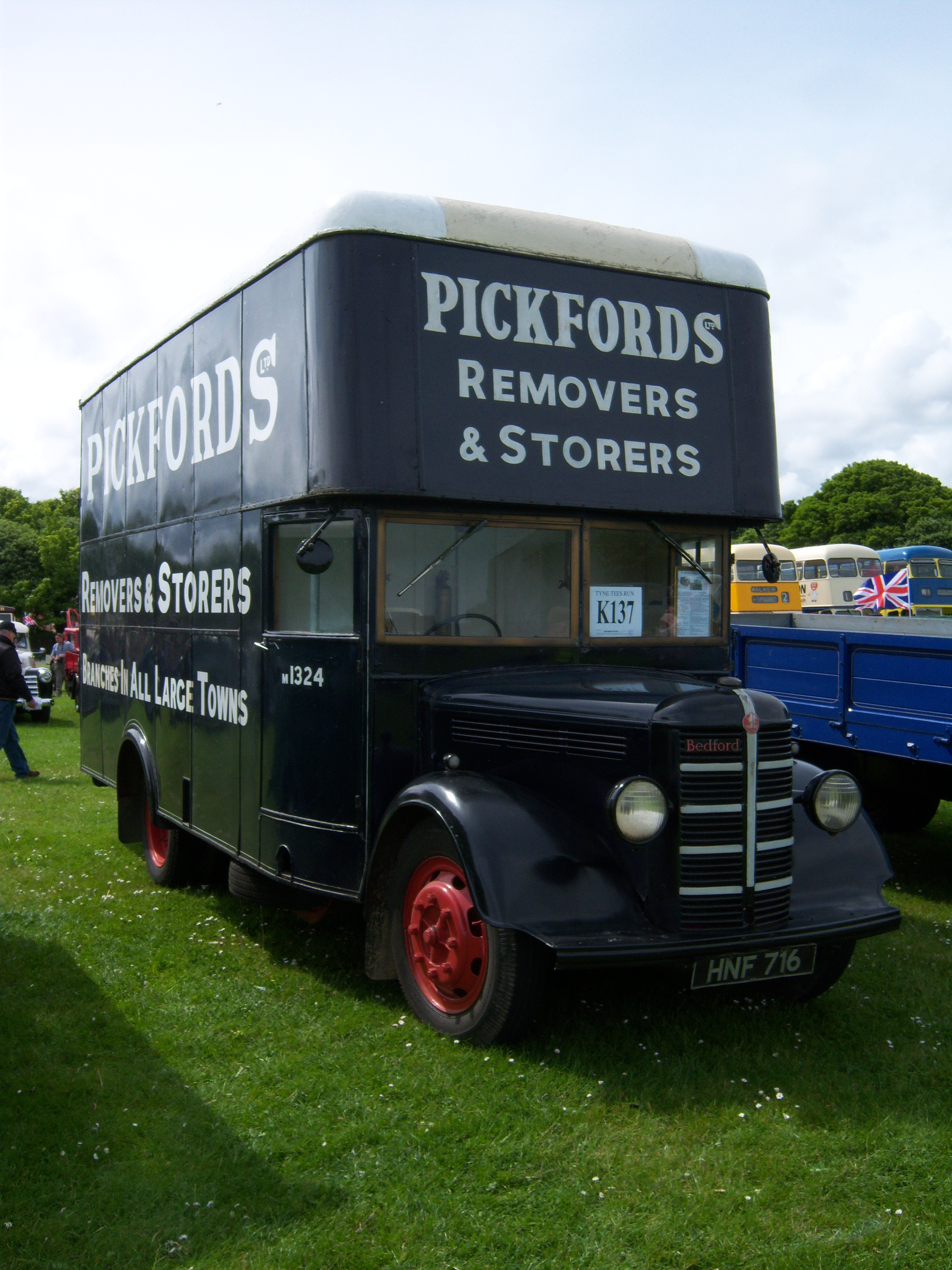
A 1947 pantechnicon van

The Pickford family of Adlington, Cheshire], and later of nearby Poynton, first entered the wagon trade in the 17th century. At first, they were engaged in supplying quarry stone by packhorse for the construction of turnpike roads; instead of the packhorses returning with empty loads, they carried goods for third parties. Pickfords was first mentioned in public records in 1646.

In 1756, the company relocated to London and in 1776 it invented the fly wagon which could travel from London to Manchester in the then fast speed of four and a half days. A year later, it bought the carrier business of William Bass, a Staffordshire haulier who carried ale for a local brewer. With the funds he went on to form Bass Brewery which still exists today. In 1779, it entered the canal industry as well (from which it withdrew in 1850). In the 19th century, it operated wagons on other companies' railways, but this was contentious, and eventually this service was eliminated.

In 1816, the company was close to bankruptcy after years of decline. The Pickford family brought in three new partners including Joseph Baxendale, whose family then ran the company for over a century. For delay in delivering a miller's iron shaft, Pickford's was involved in the famous English contract law case, Hadley v. Baxendale (1848), where the court held the company was not liable for unforeseeable losses resulting from their lateness.

In the 20th century, the company switched to road haulage. During this time it formed a rivalry with fellow hauliers Carter Paterson, with whom (amongst others) they merged in 1912, although both kept their separate names.

=== Nationalisation ===
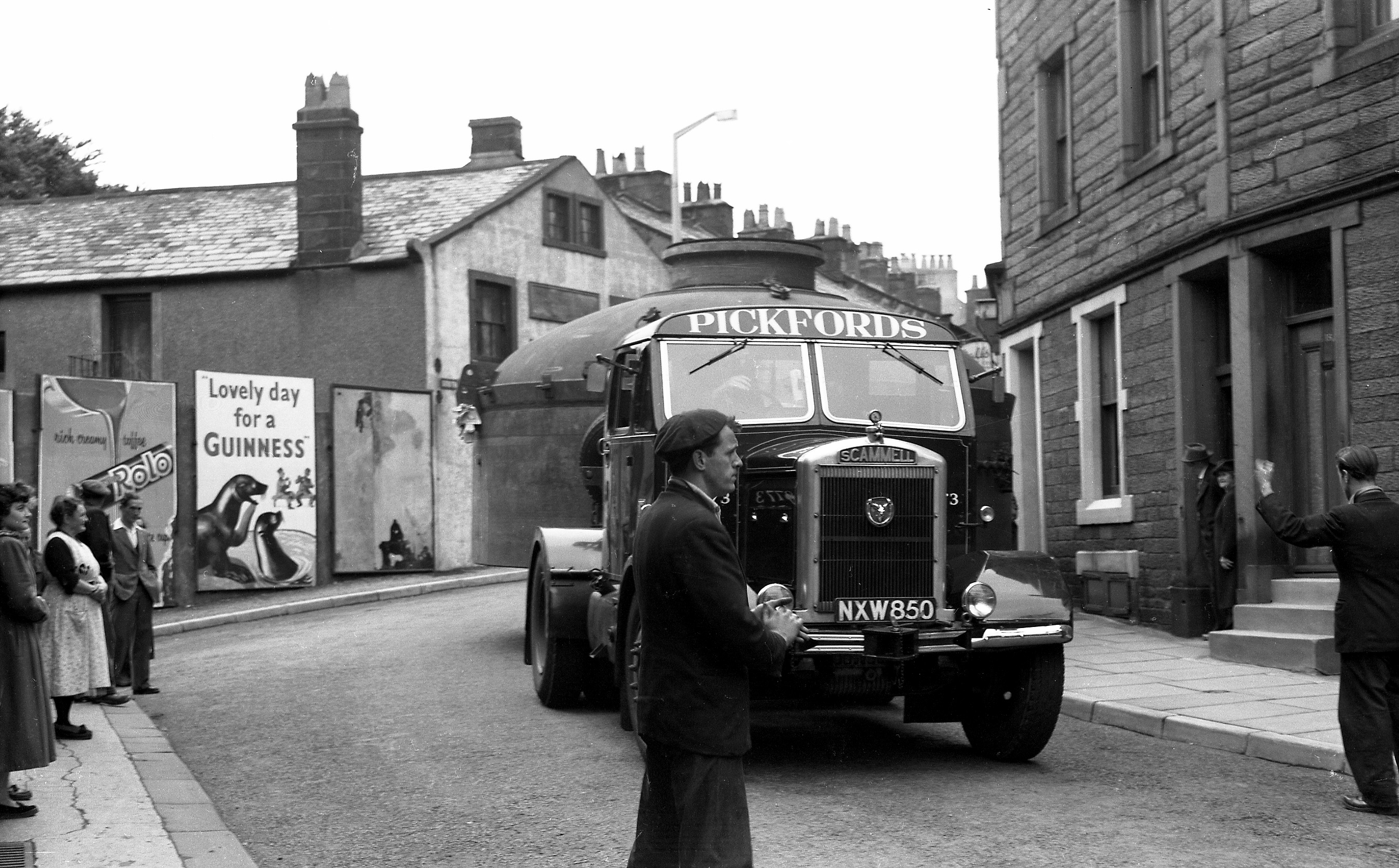
Transporting a heat exchanger to Calder Hall nuclear power station circa 1954

In 1920, the company was sold again, to the Hay's Wharf Cartage Company, on the back of a burgeoning post-World War I home removals business. Pickfords still continued to operate under that name. In turn Hay's Wharf was taken over by the four main British railway companies in 1934 and was subsequently nationalised in 1947 as part of British Road Services and what would become the National Freight Corporation (NFC) in 1969.

In 1942, the heavy haulage division moved Mulberry harbour sections (temporary harbour) to sea launchings prior to them being towed across the English Channel for the Normandy landings.

As part of the NFC, Pickfords was involved in a wide range of haulage activities, including heavy haulage (moving oversize loads) from the 1950s to the 1980s. The company absorbed several well-known haulage companies during this period but then withdrew from the sector. A number of former Pickfords vehicles have been preserved and can be seen at events, demonstrating moving outsize loads along with the earlier steam tractors.

=== Privatisation ===
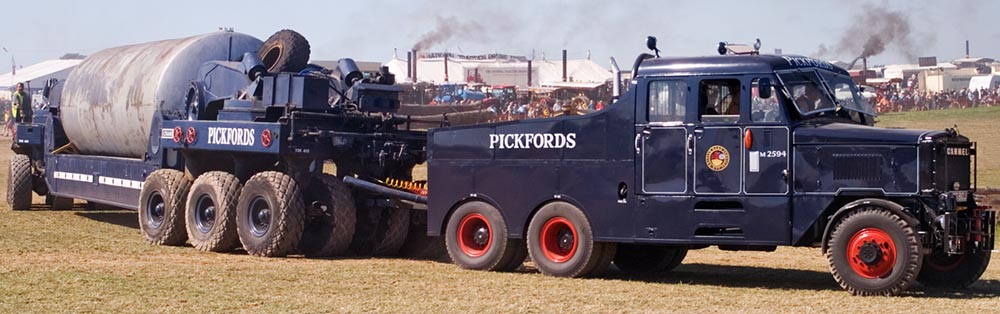
A Pickfords ballast tractor at the Great Dorset Steam Fair

The National Freight Consortium, as it was subsequently renamed, was privatised via a sale to employees in 1982. Downard Pickfords (later Allied Pickfords Australia) was established in 1982 when Downard Transport in Australia was purchased.

Pickfords' travel agency business was the second largest in the UK in 1984 and included the Harry Leek chain as well as its own brand. Pickfords Travel was sold to Airtours in 1992, when it comprised the Pickfords and Hourmont Travel brands; Hourmont had been acquired by Pickfords in 1987. After Airtours acquired the travel agency business of Hogg Robinson in 1993 it was merged with Pickfords and Hourmont Travel to form Going Places.

In 1996, the NFC sold Pickfords to the American company Allied Van Lines in a deal worth $400 million, In 2002 the parent company was renamed, becoming Allied.

In 2009, Allied Pickfords, the international arm of Pickfords, became Pickfords. The company continues to operate as part of the Allied International Network which has 600 offices in over 45 countries.

In 2012, the UK arm of the company entered a pre-packaged insolvency, before being bought by two of its directors. This deal secured employment for the company's 900 staff members.

As part of its approach to corporate responsibility, Pickfords announced a fundraising partnership with the NSPCC in 2010.

== Publications ==
- Hays Wharf Cartage Company (1947) Transport Saga, 1646 - 1947. London: Hays Wharf Cartage Company (a history of Pickford's Ltd and Carter Paterson & Co.)
