= Flyman =

Flyman may refer to:

- Flyman (theater), one who manipulates curtains and scenery
- A man who drives a fly
- The Fly (Red Circle Comics), a fictional character
- Pseudonym for the founder of the Russian Business Network
- FlyMan : Empyrean, a stickman game on Facebook
