= E.E. Ward Moving =

Moving company based in USA

- Formerly: Ward Transfer Line
- Industry: Moving and storage
- Founded: 1881
- Founders: John T. and William Ward
- Headquarters: Grove City, Ohio, U.S.
- Owners: Brian Brooks and Dominique Reighard Brooks
- Website: eeward.com

E.E. Ward Moving is the oldest continuously operating African American owned business in the United States. Originally named the Ward Transfer Line, it was founded in 1881 by John T. Ward, a conductor on the Underground Railroad, and his son William. In 2001 it was bought by Brian Brooks and Otto Beatty III. Beatty left the company in 2015.

The company is currently a moving agent for North American Van Lines. They were a founding member of the Laps for Lunches program, which helps fight food insecurity.
