= Bankers (Ireland) Act 1845 =

Act of the Parliament of the United Kingdom

Bankers (Ireland) Act 1845 (Note: The citation of this act by this short title was authorised by section 1 of, and the first schedule to, the Short Titles Act 1896. Due to the repeal of those provisions it is now authorised by section 19(2) of the Interpretation Act 1978.)
- Act of Parliament
- Parliament of the United Kingdom
- Long title: An Act to regulate the Issue of Bank Notes in Ireland, and to regulate the Repayment of certain Sums advanced by the Governor and Company of the Bank of Ireland for the Public Service.
- Citation: 8 & 9 Vict. c. 37
- Territorial extent: United Kingdom

Dates
- Royal assent: 21 July 1845
- Commencement: 6 December 1845 (Note: Section 1.)
Other legislation
Amends	Bank of Ireland Act 1781
Amended by	Statute Law Revision Act 1875; Bills of Exchange Act 1882; Bankers (Northern Ireland) Act 1928; Statute Law Revision Act 1963; Statute Law Revision (Northern Ireland) Act 1980; Banking Act 2009

Status: Amended

Text of statute as originally enacted

The Bankers (Ireland) Act 1845 (8 & 9 Vict. c. 37) is an act of the Parliament of the United Kingdom, which regulated the issuing of banknotes and the repayment of sums towards the Governor and Company of the Bank of Ireland for public service. The act was later amended by the Bankers (Northern Ireland) Act 1928 (18 & 19 Geo. 5. c. 15). Declan Curry characterised the act as introducing a "highly restrictive monetary regime in Britain and Ireland".

== Subsequent developments ==
Section 22 of the act was repealed by section 1 of, and the schedule to, the Statute Law Revision Act 1963, which came into force on 31 July 1963.

Section 9 of the act was repealed by section 1 of, and part X of the schedule to, the Statute Law Revision (Northern Ireland) Act 1980, which came into force on 13 November 1980.

Section 8 was repealed by the Banking Act 2009.
