= Bankers (Northern Ireland) Act 1928 =

Act of the Parliament of the United Kingdom

Bankers (Northern Ireland) Act 1928 (Note: Section 4(1).)
- Act of Parliament
- Parliament of the United Kingdom
- Long title: An Act to reduce and re-apportion the aggregate amount of the fiduciary bank-note issues of banks in Northern Ireland, and to restrict the circulation in Northern Ireland of notes issued outside the United Kingdom, and otherwise to amend the Bankers (Ireland) Act 1845 in its application to Northern Ireland.
- Citation: 18 & 19 Geo. 5. c. 15
- Territorial extent: United Kingdom

Dates
- Royal assent: 2 July 1928
- Commencement: 22 November 1928 (Note: Section 4(3). SR&O 1928/897.)
Other legislation
Amends	Bankers (Ireland) Act 1845
Amended by	Statute Law Revision Act 1950; Statute Law Revision (Northern Ireland) Act 1980; Banking Act 2009
Relates to	Currency Act 1927

Status: Partially repealed

Text of statute as originally enacted

Revised text of statute as amended

Text of the Bankers (Northern Ireland) Act 1928 as in force today (including any amendments) within the United Kingdom, from legislation.gov.uk.

The Bankers (Ireland) Act 1928 (18 & 19 Geo. 5. c. 15) is an act of the Parliament of the United Kingdom which amended the Bankers (Ireland) Act 1845 (8 & 9 Vict. c. 37) in application to Northern Ireland after the 1921 Partition of Ireland, and to restrict circulation, in Northern Ireland, of notes issued outside of the United Kingdom.

The act was passed in response to the Currency Act 1927.

As to commencement, see section 4(3) and SR&O 1928/897.

== Sources ==
- The Statutes: Third Revised Edition. 1950. Volume 19. Page 389.
- "The Bankers (Northern Ireland) Act, 1928". Annual Survey of English Law 1928. p 121. Google
- "British Isles: United Kingdom" (1930) 12 Journal of Comparative Legislation and International Law (Third Series) 9
- "Bankers (Northern Ireland) Bill" (1928) 126 Financial Chronicle 3222 (26 May 1928)
- (1978) 222 The Bankers' Magazine 13
- (1928) Monthly Review, p 6
- "British Banking Section" (1939) 133 The Statist 39, 43 and 44 (27 May 1939)
- S Evelyn Thomas. Banker and Customer. Fourth Edition. Donnington Press. 1936. Page 76.
- Kenneth Mackenzie. The Banking Systems of Great Britain, France, Germany, & the United States of America. Second Edition. Macmillan & Co. 1937. Pages 109 and 111.
- C R Josset. Money in Great Britain and Ireland. David & Charles. Newton Abbott. 1971. Pages 185 and 377. Google
- Forrest Capie and Alan Webber. A Monetary History of the United Kingdom: 1870-1982. 1985. Routledge. Reprinted 2006. Volume 1. Pages 11, 212 and 216 to 219.
- Cormac Ó Gráda. The Economic Development of Ireland Since 1870. An Elgar Reference Collection. 1994. Volume 1. Pages 179, 185 and 186. Reprinted from (1970) 1 The Economic and Social Review 53, 59 and 60.
- Gibson and Spencer (eds). Economic Activity in Ireland. Gill and Macmillan. 1977. Page 243. Google
- F G Hall. The Bank of Ireland, 1783-1946. Hodges Figgis. 1949. Pages 361 and 362. Google.
- Maurice Moynihan. Currency and Central Banking in Ireland, 1922-1960. Central Bank of Ireland. Gill and Macmillan. Dublin. 1975. Pages 147 and 149 to 166. Google
- Keith Le Cheminant. Colonial and Foreign Banking Systems. 1924. Second Revised Edition. 1931. Routledge. 2012. Volume 19. Page 124.
- Annual Report of the Director of the Mint for the Fiscal Year ended June 30, 1929. United States Government Printing Office. Washington. 1929. Page 166
- Encyclopædia Britannica. 1944. Volume 3. Page 76.
