= Fly (carriage) =

In the field of transport a fly is, by definition, a vehicle that moves quickly. Examples include a light horse-drawn public passenger vehicle or delivery wagon or a light, covered, vehicle hired from a livery stable (such as a single-horse pleasure carriage or a hansom cab).

Examples of flys

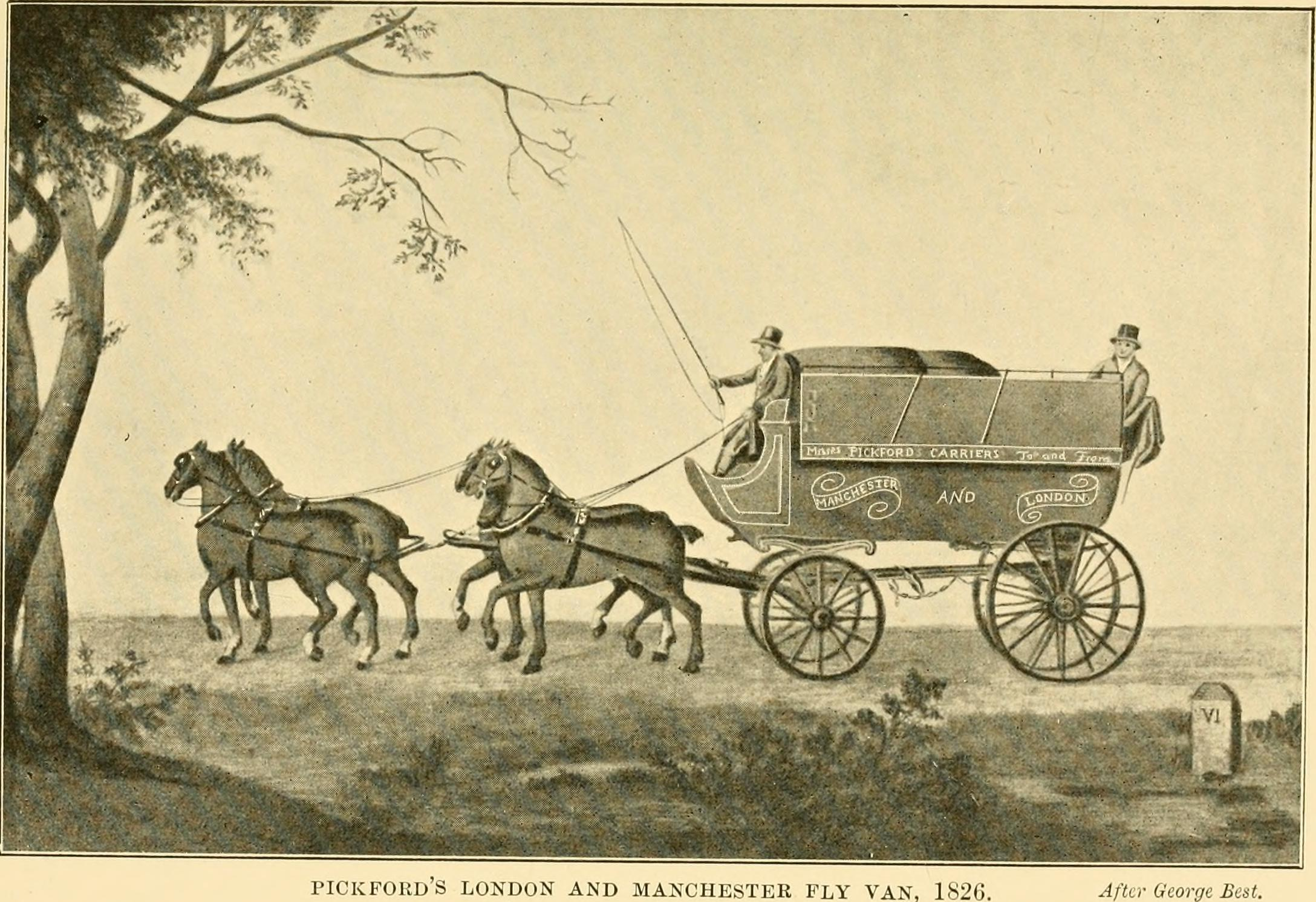
A Pickfords Fly

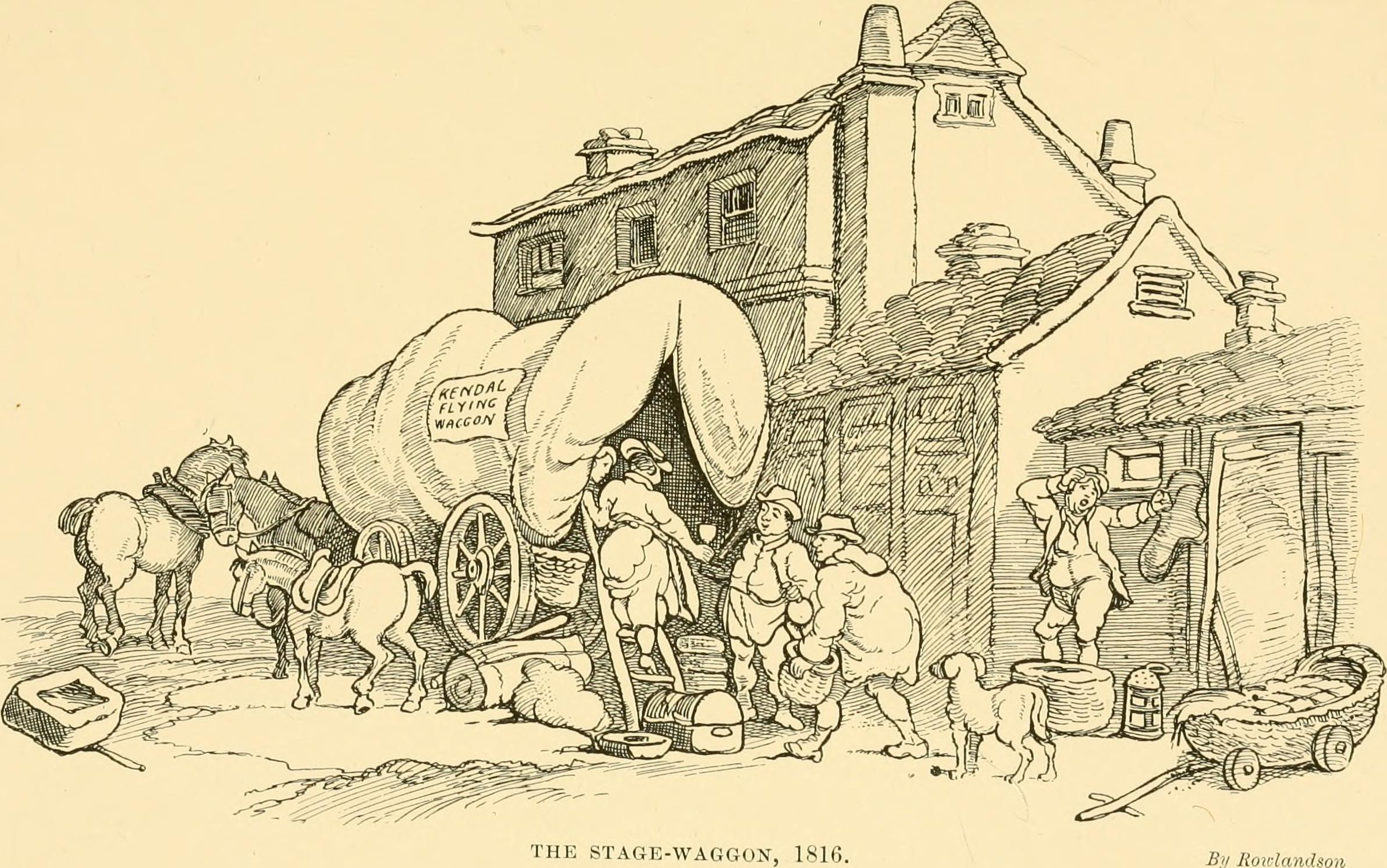
Passengers board the Kendal Fly - after Thomas Rowlandson, 1816

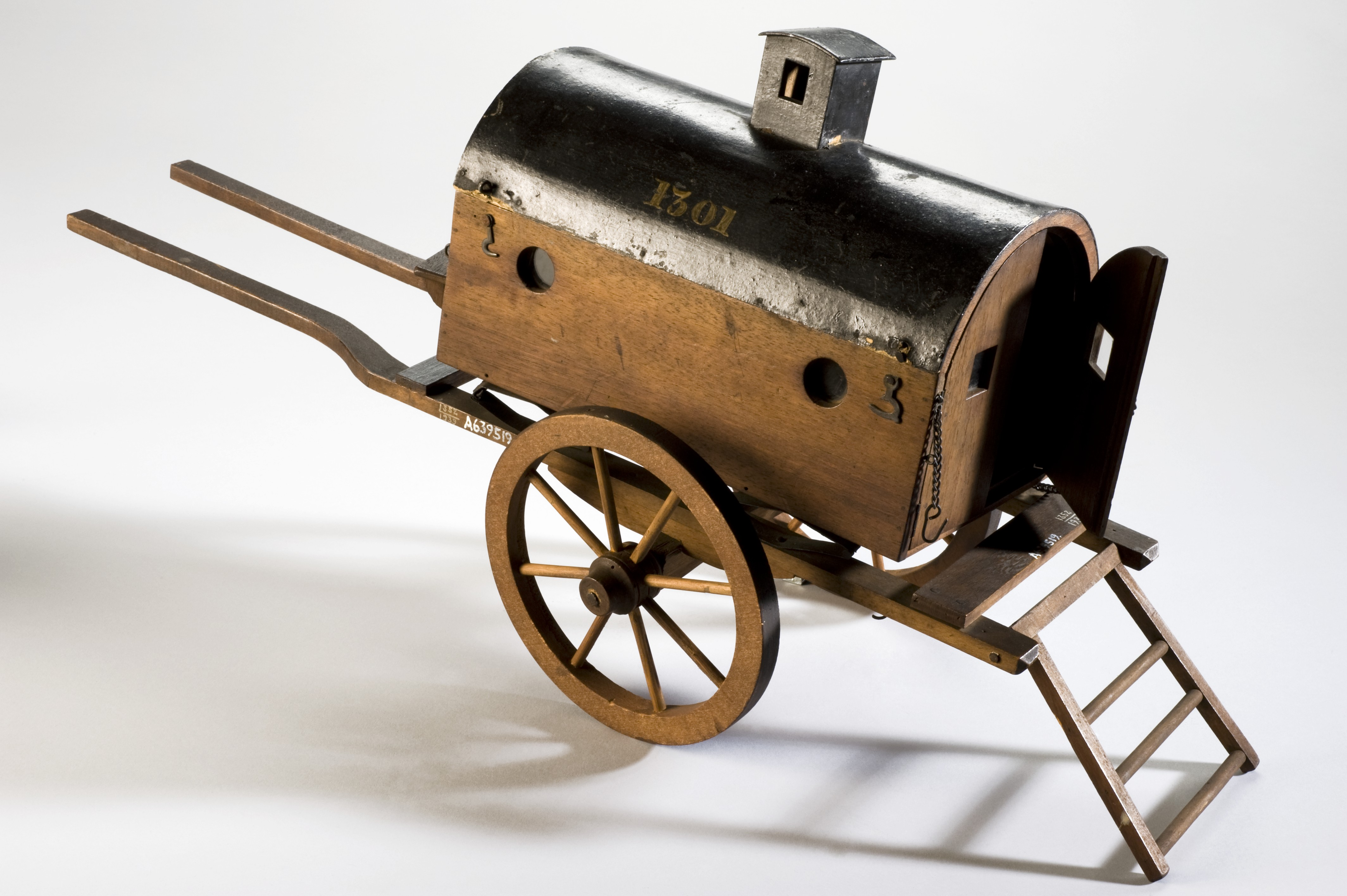
Flying ambulance 1790 (model) for the fast transport of wounded soldiers from battlefield to hospital

== See also ==
- Carriage
- Horse-drawn vehicle
