= Carter Paterson =

British road haulage firm

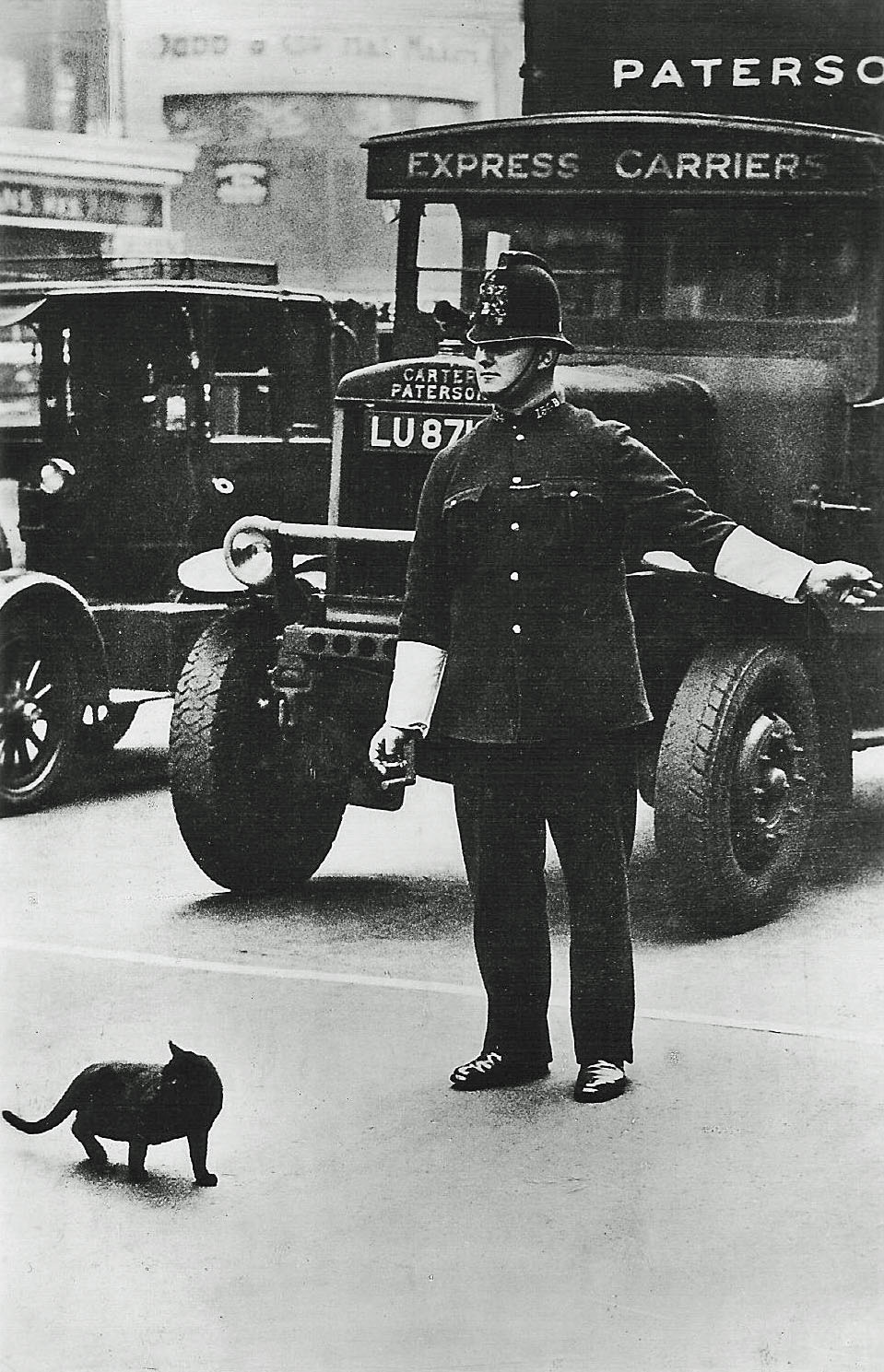
Carter Paterson lorry presumably at Fleet Street junction with Ludgate Circus sometime in the late 1920s

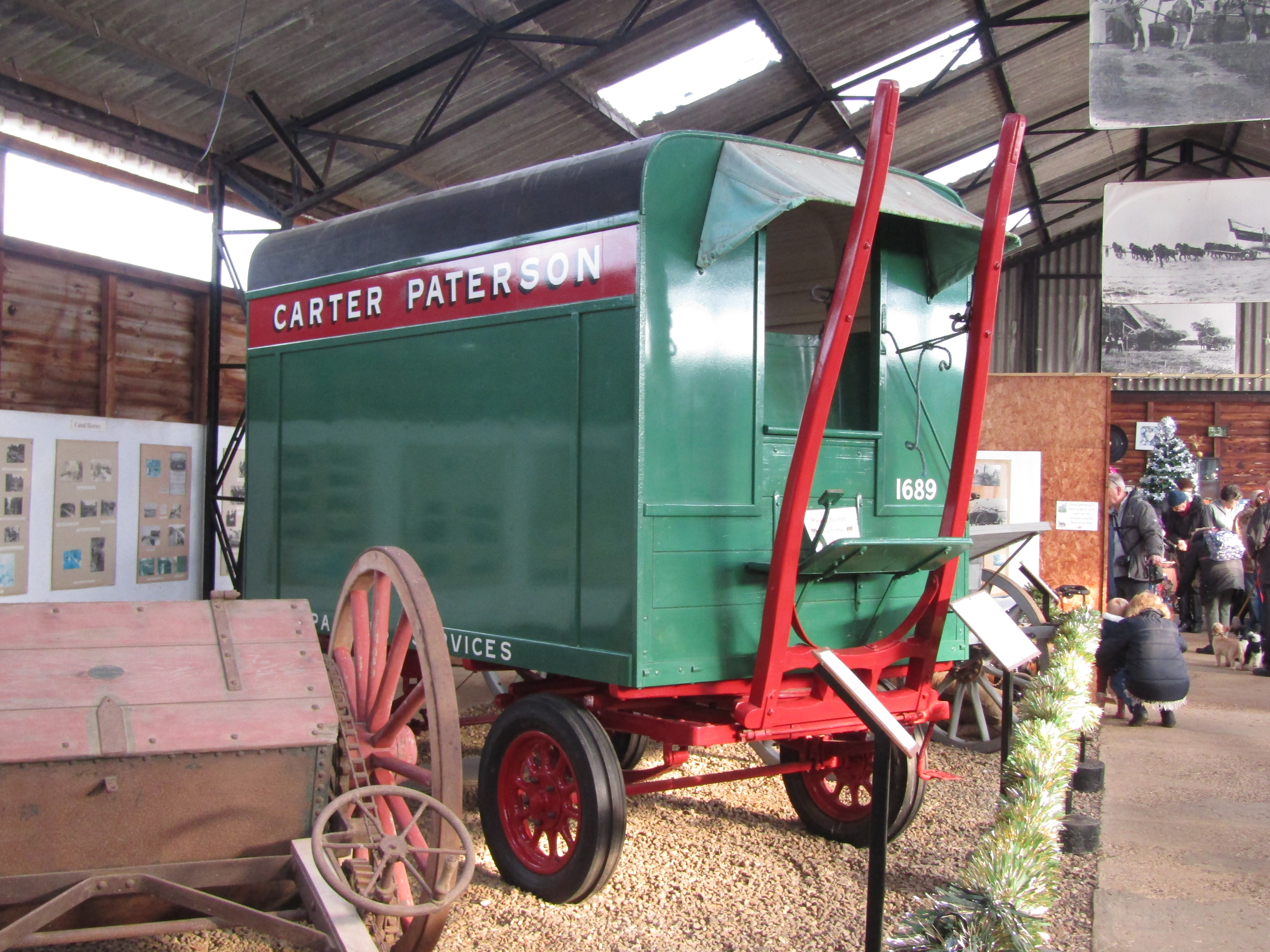
A horse drawn general cargo wagon

Carter Paterson (CP) was a British road haulage firm, closely associated with the railway industry.

== History ==
It was founded in 1860, formed into a private company (Carter, Paterson & Co., Ltd.) in 1887, and converted into a public company in February 1934. In October 1933, the Big Four railway companies purchased control of the company in equal shares. Its head office was at 128 Goswell Road, London EC1.

Ownership passed on nationalisation to the British Transport Commission and CP was subsequently absorbed into British Road Services.

== Popular media ==
In Dracula, by Bram Stoker, the Count's “fifty cases of common earth” were transferred from King's Cross to Carfax (in Purfleet) on August 21 by Carter, Paterson & Co. for £8 2s and 3d. On September 30, when one of the vampire hunters interviewed the CP workers involved in that delivery, they hinted strongly that money for drinks would help loosen their tongues. (Carters for a different company, which removed boxes from Carfax, also suggested that money for drinks would help them to answer questions.)

The lovelorn batman to Clive Brook's Major Daviot, Tandy, played by Gus McNaughton, compares their peripatetic lifestyle unfavourably to a career in Carter Paterson, in the 1937 film, Action for Slander.

In Hugh Lofting's "Dr. Doolittle’s Post Office," Mudface the turtle (a witness to Noah's Ark) is asked to bring the doctor a souvenir of the drowned city of Shalba in the depths of Lake Junganyika. He returns with a huge carved stone window ledge. Cheapface the sparrow exclaims "Great Carter Patterson!"

In the 1950 film The 20 Questions Murder Mystery, Mary Rona Anderson says her uncle's name was Carter, her aunt's Paterson, but that doesn't make them Carter Paterson.

In the Dad's Army episode "Sons of the Sea" Captain Mainwaring asks Pike to ask Carter Paterson to move his cart as it is in the way of his Bren gun target. In the episode "The Captain's Car", Pike places a bucket full of manure on Captain Mainwaring's desk because "Carter Paterson's horse has just gone down the road".

In "Mabel and I" by R. Andom, a "policeman, a Carter Paterson man, the greengrocer and his eldest son" are all lost in the fog until four o'clock on Christmas morning.

In Howards End by E. M. Forster, Margaret Schlegel comments about her sister Helen's sudden engagement: "If Helen ... had wanted to marry the man who calls for Carter Paterson, I should have said the same.” Then she adds: “Though in the case of Carter Paterson I should want it to be a very long engagement indeed, I must say.”
