= NorthStar Moving =

American moving and storage company

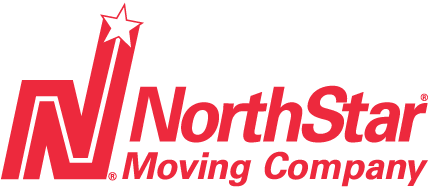
- Type: Private
- Industry: Moving & Storage
- Founded: 1994; 30 years ago
- Founder: Ram Katalan & Laura McHolm
- Headquarters: Northridge, California (formerly Chatsworth, CA), US
- Website: www.northstarmoving.com

NorthStar Moving Company is an American moving and storage company headquartered in Los Angeles, California. The company expanded beyond Los Angeles with locations in San Francisco, San Mateo, Newport Beach, Phoenix, and Austin. They provide residential and commercial moving and storage services, including local, long-distance, and international relocations.

== History ==
NorthStar Moving Company was founded in 1994 by Laura McHolm and Ram Katalan. The company focuses on environmental sustainability, including the use of recyclable packing materials, biodiesel-powered trucks, and electric moving vans. In 2016, NorthStar Moving announced the expansion of its franchise operations. NorthStar Moving is a member of the International Association of Movers.

NorthStar Moving Company participates in charitable initiatives and partnerships with nonprofit organizations, including Move For Hunger, Claire’s Place Foundation, and Miry’s List and Make-A-Wish Greater Los Angeles. Since 2012, the company has organized an annual food drive, “Let’s Send Hunger Packing,” benefiting the Los Angeles Regional Food Bank and raising funds to provide meals for food-insecure families in Los Angeles County. In 2025, NorthStar Moving participated in wildfire relief efforts in Los Angeles County, including the transportation of donated household goods and supplies for individuals displaced by the Palisades wildfires.

In 2022, NorthStar Moving Company won a trademark infringement lawsuit against King David Van Lines and its operators. A federal judge awarded NorthStar Moving $13 million in damages after finding that the defendants had willfully infringed NorthStar Moving's trademark by deceiving consumers into believing they were hiring NorthStar Moving.

NorthStar Moving Company is included in moving company rankings for California published by Forbes and USA Today. The company was named one of the Los Angeles Business Journal's “Best Places to Work” in the medium-sized business category for ten consecutive years. Co-founder Laura McHolm is cited in publications such as The New York Times Wirecutter, and Today regarding moving, storage, and home organization topics.
