= Trafford power station =

Former power station

- Country: England
- Location: Trafford
- Coordinates: 53°28′44″N 02°19′22″W
- Status: Decommissioned
- Commission date: 1929
- Decommission date: 1976
- Owners: Stretford and District Electricity Board (1928–1948); British Electricity Authority (1948–1955); Central Electricity Authority (1955–1957); Central Electricity Generating Board (1958–1976)
- Operator: As owner

Thermal power station
- Primary fuel: Coal
- Secondary fuel: Fuel oil (gas turbine)
- Turbine technology: steam turbines and gas turbine
- Cooling source: Canal water

Power generation
- Units operational: 2 x 30 MW, 1 x 15 MW
- Make and model: Parsons, Metropolitan-Vickers
- Nameplate capacity: 60 MW
- Annual net output: 361,561 GWh

Trafford power station supplied electricity to the Trafford and Stretford areas of Greater Manchester, and to the national grid, from 1929 to 1976. The generating station was built by the Stretford and District Electricity Board which it operated until the nationalisation of the British electricity supply industry in 1948. The 60 megawatt coal-fired station was supplemented in 1952 with an experimental 15 megawatt gas turbine generating set.

== History ==
Electric light and power had first been supplied to the 1100 acre (445 ha) Trafford Park area by the Trafford Power and Light Supply Limited which operated a power station on the site. In 1902 the maximum demand was 2,620 kW and the annual generation of electricity was 8,000 MWh. The company was taken over by The Trafford Power and Light Supply (1902) Limited in 1902. This company intended to supply businesses at Trafford Park with electric lighting and power, and with fuel gas.

In 1928 the public supply Trafford power station was promoted by the Stretford and District Electricity Board which obtained its legal powers through the Stretford and District Electricity Board Act 1928 (18 & 19 Geo. 5 c. lxxxix). The new Trafford power station was opened in 1929 also at Trafford Park which provided rail and canal access for the delivery of coal and removal of ash. The Manchester Ship Canal provided a supply of cooling water for the station.

The British electricity supply industry was nationalised in 1948 under the provisions of the Electricity Act 1947 (10 & 11 Geo. 6 c. 54). The Stretford and District Electricity Board was dissolved; ownership of Trafford power station was vested in the British Electricity Authority, and subsequently the Central Electricity Authority and the Central Electricity Generating Board (CEGB). At the same time the electricity distribution and sales responsibilities of the Stretford and District Board were transferred to the North Western Electricity Board (NORWEB).

In addition to the conventional steam turbine plant Trafford had the UK's first gas turbine generator. The 15 MW gas turbine was commissioned on 6 August 1952. However, it did not achieve commercial service until 1957 and was decommissioned by 1967.

Trafford power station was decommissioned on 25 October 1976.

== Equipment specification ==
=== Steam plant ===
The steam driven generating plant comprised:

- Boilers
  - 2 × Babcock & Wilcox 150,000 lb/h (18.9 kg/s) boilers with chain grate stokers, operating at 425 psi and 825 °F (29.3 bar and 440 °C)
  - 2 × Babcock & Wilcox 220,000 lb/h (27.7 kg/s) boilers with chain grate stokers, operating at 425 psi and 825 °F (29.3 bar and 440 °C), these boiler supplied steam to:
- Turbo-alternators
  - 1 × Parsons 30 MW turbo-alternator, generating at 33 kW, commissioned December 1941
  - 1 × Metropolitan-Vickers 30 MW turbo-alternator, generating at 33 kV, commissioned December 1947

=== Gas turbine plant ===
This 15 MW unit was the first gas turbine constructed for the British Electricity Authority. It was built by Metropolitan-Vickers and consisted of: a low pressure compressor, inter-cooler, high pressure compressor, heat exchanger, combustion chamber, high pressure turbine, reheat combustion chamber, and low pressure turbine; exhaust from the latter was fed back to the heat exchanger prior to discharge. The gas turbine was directly coupled to a 15 MW generator operating at 6.6 kV, 50 Hz.

== Operational data ==
Operating data for the steam station for the period 1946–72 was:

Trafford power station operating data, 1946–72
Year	Running hours or load factor (per cent)	Max output capacity MW	Electricity supplied MWh	Thermal efficiency per cent
1946	67.6 %	–	134,821	24.53
1954	8740	58	361,561	24.73
1955	7767	58	316,550	23.81
1956	8290	58	329,626	24.53
1957	7829	58	261,624	24.08
1958	7901	58	296,549	23.49
1961	52.8 %	58	268,372	22.38
1962	33.4 %	58	169,665	22.20
1963	32.65 %	58	165,860	22.85
1967	52.0 %	59	268,825	22.99
1972	24.8 %	59	128,311	21.11

== See also ==
- Timeline of the UK electricity supply industry
- List of power stations in England
