= National Freight Corporation =

British transport business between 1948 and 2000

- Founded: 1948
- Defunct: 2000
- Fate: Merged with Ocean Group plc
- Successor: Exel
- Headquarters: London, England
- Key people: Christopher Bland (Chairman); Gerry Murphy (CEO)

The National Freight Corporation was a major British transport business between 1948 and 2000. It was listed on the London Stock Exchange and at one time, as NFC plc, was a constituent of the FTSE 100 Index.

== History ==
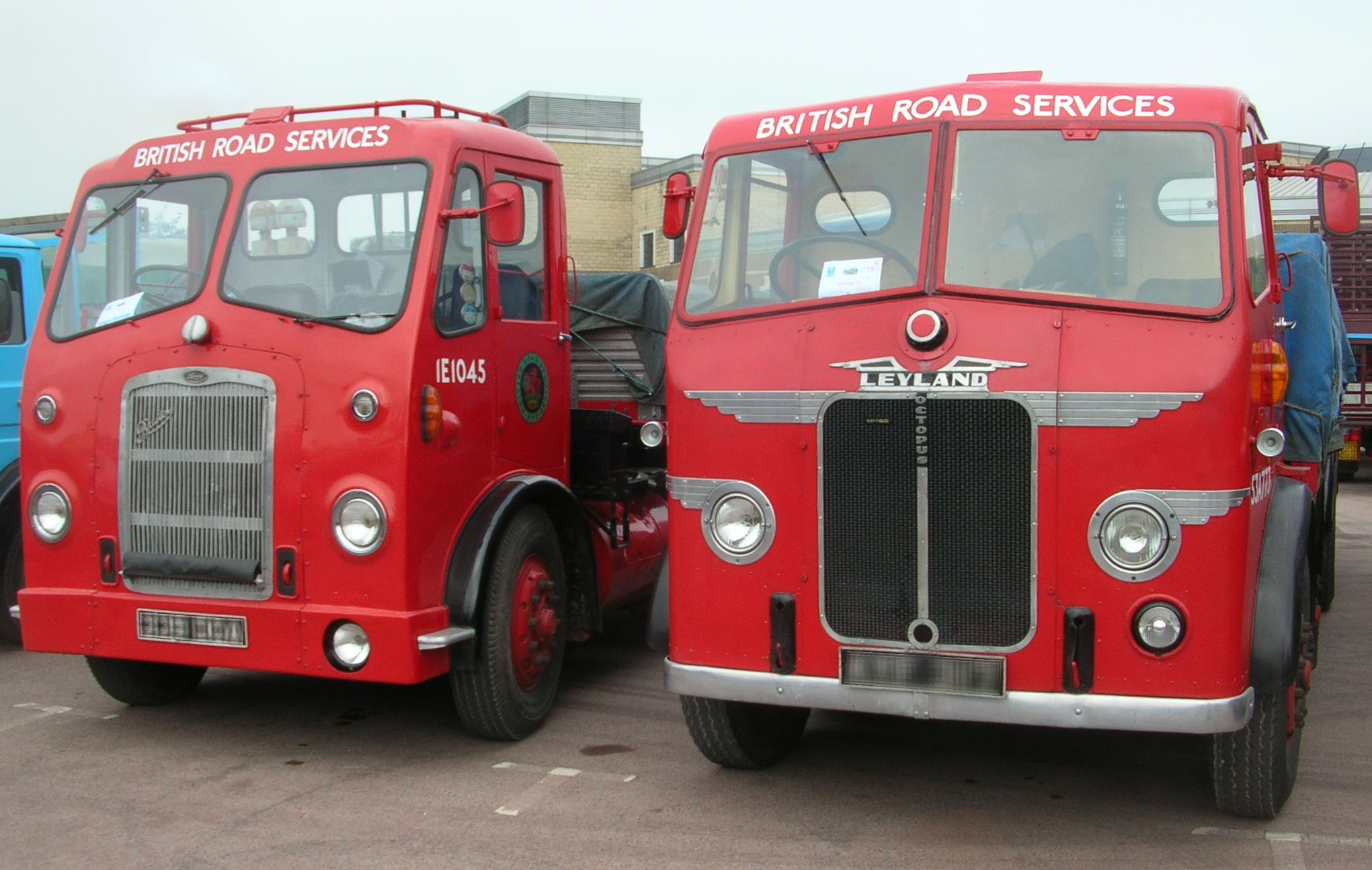
BRS liveried trucks

The company was established in 1948 as British Road Services (BRS). It was the road transport company formed by the nationalisation of Britain's road haulage industry, under the British Transport Commission, as a result of the Transport Act 1947.

From 1963, the company was administered by the Transport Holding Company and had four main operating areas: British Road Services, BRS Parcels, Pickfords and Containerway & Roadferry.

On 1 January 1969, it was renamed the National Freight Corporation. On the same date a 51% share in Freightliner was transferred from the British Railways Board (BRB). This was transferred back to the BRB on 1 August 1978.

In 1980, the assets of the National Freight Corporation were transferred to the National Freight Company. In 1982, the company was sold to its employees as the National Freight Consortium in one of the first privatisations of state-owned industry. The new company was first listed on the London Stock Exchange in 1989 and subsequently became NFC plc.

BRS Parcels was rebranded as Roadline and was sold in a management buy-out as Lynx Express in 1997. NFC disposed of Pickfords in 1999 to Allied Van Lines.

In 2000, NFC plc merged with Ocean Group plc to form Exel plc.
