= North American Van Lines =

Trucking company

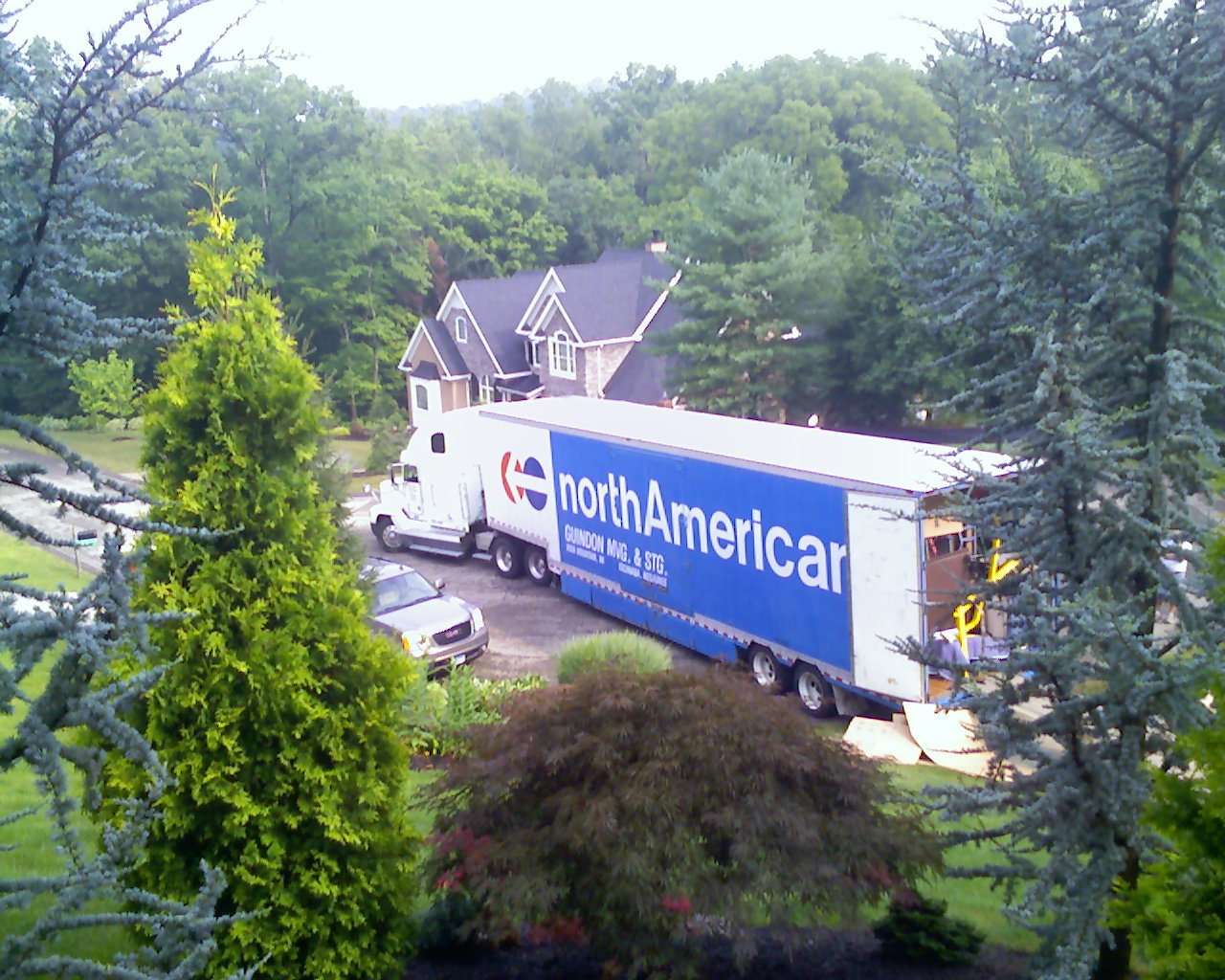
- Type: Private agent-owned
- Industry: Moving and storage
- Founded: 1933
- Headquarters: Fort Wayne, Indiana, U.S.
- Key people: Thomas Oberdorf (CEO)
- Parent: SIRVA
- Website: www.northamerican.com

North American Van Lines, or NAVL, is a large American trucking company originally formed in Cleveland, Ohio, and later based in Fort Wayne, Indiana, which specializes in home and office relocations.

== History ==
North American Van Lines was established in 1933 by a group of 12 agents. By 1938 the network expanded to 120 agents, and eventually grew into one of the largest trucking companies. In 1947, NAVL moved from Cleveland, Ohio to Fort Wayne, Indiana. (Note: 20 December 1940 Ohio NORTH AMERICAN VAN LINES, INC. Dissolution By Merger Aug 12 1946) In 1952 NAVL became an international company, with the addition of its International Transportation Service business. In 1959 NAVL bought Creston Transfer, moving new furniture, fixtures, and similar household goods throughout the US. This New Product Division was later renamed Commercial Transport in 1981.

Beginning in late 1964 NAVL created its STI (Specialized Transportation Inc.) High Value Products Division (HVPD), which later was bought out and taken private as an independent company named Specialized Transportation Inc. The original division began with 20 drivers from the NAVL Exhibit and Display Division, and moved high value electronics for defense installations, contracted by Control Data Corporation, IBM and the computer division of General Electric.

On May 10, 1966, NAVL created its subsidiary Transtar Services, Inc. in Brentwood, TN. Transtar Services supported a group of rail and water carriers of fuel, raw materials and steel freight around the Great Lakes, as wholly owned transportation subsidiaries of United States Steel Corporation, now USX Corporation (NYSE: X). In December 1988 the companies were organized as the USX subsidiary, Transtar, Inc.

=== PepsiCo ===
On July 5, 1966, Spedco Inc., a subsidiary of PepsiCo Inc., applied to the Interstate Commerce Commission to purchase NAVL for about US$22 million in PepsiCo stock. On August 29, 1967, the ICC examiner recommended the acquisition of NAVL by Spedco Inc, and on November 27, 1968, NAVL was acquired by Spedco Inc., which had Kenneth W. Maxfield as its Executive Vice President. By June 1969, North American Van Lines Inc. was fully acquired by PepsiCo.

On January 1, 1970, NAVPAC was merged into NAVL. (Note: The Corporate Record is lost, but the Indiana Secretary of State has a notation of the creation, on August 8, 1963) In 1975 NAVL started its Air Freight Division. In 1977, Kenneth W. Maxfield was promoted to President of the NAVL subsidiary. Also that year, NAVL became the secret transporter of the King Tutankhamen treasures from Egypt during the North American tour. In 1978 NAVL headquarters in Fort Wayne, Indiana moved to the new building location, spread across 121 acres (0.49 km^{2}). In 1979 NAVL moved to the top of the list among the six largest van lines. By April 1984, North American Van Lines Inc. was put up for sale by PepsiCo.

=== Norfolk Southern ===
On May 3, 1984, NAVL was approved for sale by PepsiCo to Norfolk Southern Corporation for US$315 million. At the same time PepsiCo was also negotiating sale of Lee Way Motor Freight, as a further move in its divestment of its transportation division. On May 23, 1984, Moving Credit Inc. merged into NAVL. (Note: Moving Credit Inc. was incorporated 31 July 1961) Over the subsequent two years NAVL was merged with the railroad in a deal that had been initially approved by the Interstate Commerce Commission.

In June 1986 NAVL then hired Norfolk Southern's advertising firm, J. Walter Thompson, Washington, to handle its advertising account of more than US$1 million. It became the first active ad campaign for NAVL since the purchase from Pepsico two years earlier. However, on October 1, 1986, a Federal appeals court ruled that the ICC had erred when it approved the acquisition. The court then returned the case to the ICC for reconsideration, but the rocky deal ultimately survived.

In 1991 NAVL started Worldtrac, which was the industry's first satellite tracking system, which provided the drivers location within 1,000 feet (300 m). In 1992 Norfolk Southern's trucking operations, including NAVL, recorded a loss of close to $40 million, and Norfolk Southern Corp. decided to sell off two of its trucking divisions in 1993, although it retained NAVL for another five years. In 1998 Norfolk Southern exited the trucking business entirely when it sold NAVL.

=== Allied Worldwide ===
On January 12, 1998, NAVL was bought out from Norfolk Southern Corp. by the private investment firm Clayton, Dubilier & Rice for more than US$200 million.

On November 21, 1999, Clayton, Dubilier and Rice also completed their acquisition of Allied Van Lines and merged it with North American Van Lines to create Allied Worldwide, although each former company maintained its own profile names. Valued at approximately US$450 million in the merger, the Allied Worldwide combined entity became the world's largest relocation and van line logistics company.

By the 2000s the company began operations in Europe and South America.

=== SIRVA ===
On October 11, 2004, a group of 43 North American Van Lines' agents, named the Specialized Transportation Agent Group Inc., bought out NAVL's High Value Products Division from SIRVA. The buyers renamed the new company Specialized Transportation Inc. (STI).

== Livery ==
The North American Van Lines trucks (beginning ca.1968) are painted in white and a clear shadow of blue, with red and blue circles on the white area, and a white arrow crossing the circles. The name North American is spelled "northAmerican" on the company's trucks' liveries.
