= Allied Van Lines =

American moving company

- Company type: Private agent-owned
- Industry: Moving and storage
- Founded: 1928; 98 years ago
- Headquarters: Oakbrook Terrace, Illinois, U.S.
- Key people: Thomas Oberdorf (CEO)
- Parent: SIRVA
- Website: allied.com

Allied Van Lines is an American moving company founded in 1928 as a cooperative non-profit organization owned by its member agents on the east coast of the United States, to help with organizing return loads and minimizing dead-heading (i.e. operating trucks without shipments loaded on them). In 1968 it was reorganized as a standard public company, with shares. In 1999 it merged with its larger competitor, North American Van Lines, and the combined entity then came under the holding company Allied Worldwide. In 2002, Allied Worldwide was renamed SIRVA.

In January 2020, Allied Van Lines was recognized by Newsweek as one of America's Best Customer Service Providers. In May 2020, Allied Van Lines earns the coveted 2020 Women's Choice Award for sixth year in a row. In July 2020, Allied Van Lines receives 37th Annual Quest for Quality Awards recognition from Logistics management. Allied Van Lines in February 2020 continues its exclusive charity partnership with The Salvation Army.

In November 2024, Allied was recognized by CNN as one of the Top Moving Companies in California.

== History ==
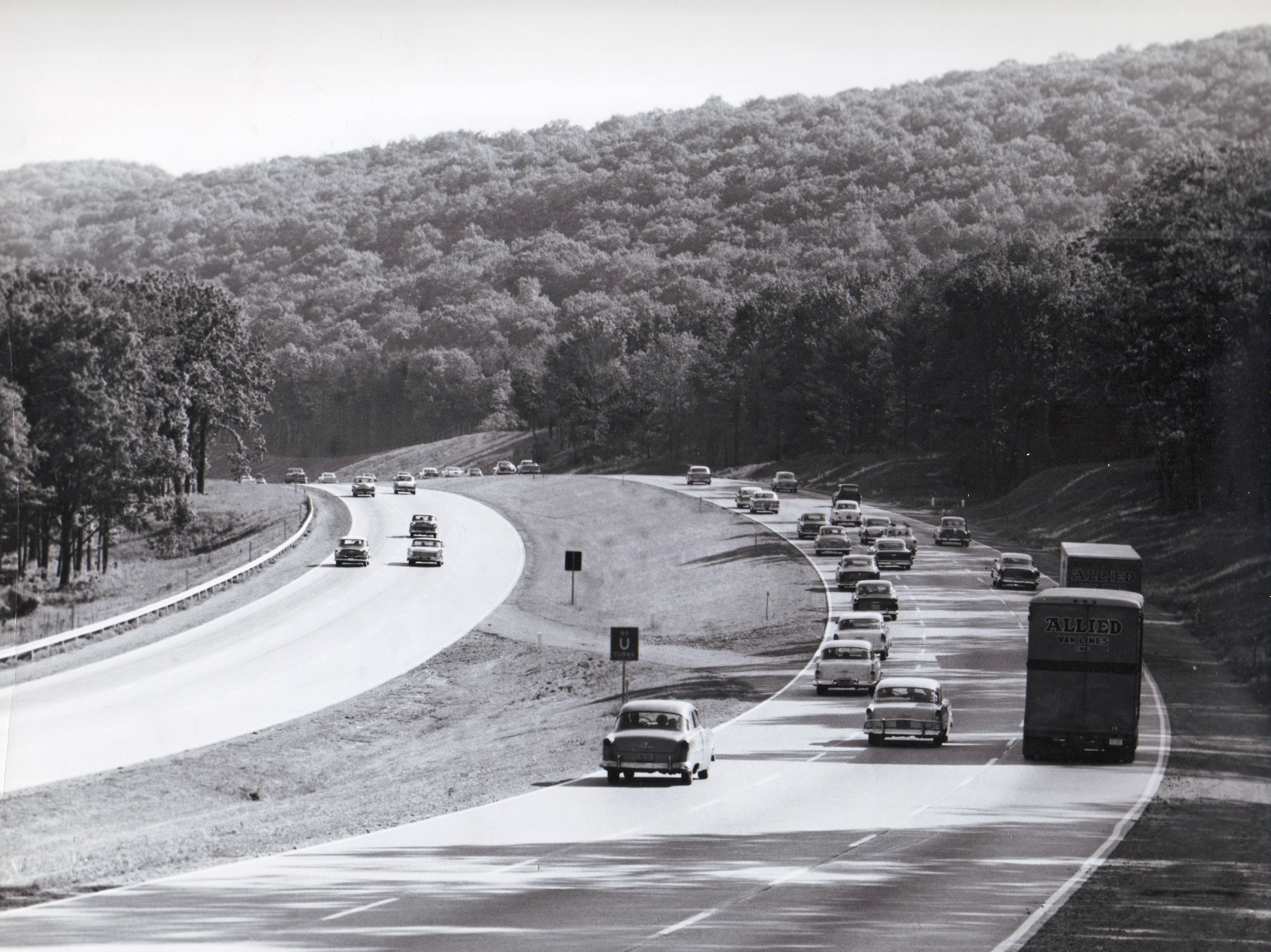
Allied Van Lines trucks on the New York State Thruway, 1958

On January 12, 1998, NAVL was bought out from Norfolk Southern Corporation (NYSE: NSC) by the private investment firm Clayton, Dubilier & Rice for more than US$200 million.

On November 21, 1999, Clayton, Dubilier and Rice also completed their acquisition of Allied Van Lines and merged it with North American Van Lines to create Allied Worldwide, although each former company maintained its own profile names. Valued at approximately US$450 million in the merger, the Allied Worldwide combined entity became the world's largest relocation and van line logistics company

In August 2020, as part of global branding strategy and continued expansion into the EMEA and APAC regions, the company unified the global brand under Allied, remaining a property of parent company SIRVA.

=== SIRVA, Inc. ===
On February 11, 2002, Allied Worldwide was renamed as SIRVA, Inc.

== See also ==
- Allied Moving Services
