= Trade Marks Act =

Trade Marks Act may refer to:

- Trade Marks Act 1995, in Australia
- Trade Marks Act (India)
- Trade Marks Act 1994, in the United Kingdom
  - Trade Marks Act 1905
  - Trade Marks Act 1914
  - Trade Marks Act 1919
  - Trade Marks (Amendment) Act 1937
  - Trade Marks Act 1938

== See also ==
- Trademark Act, in the United States
- Trademark Act (Japan)
- Trademarks Act, in Canada
- Trade Marks Ordinance, in Hong Kong
