= Elected Representatives (Prohibition of Deception) Bill 2006–07 =

Proposed law of the United Kingdom

Elected Representatives (Prohibition of Deception) Bill
- Bill
- Parliament of the United Kingdom
- Long title: A Bill to create offences in relation to the publication of false or misleading statements by elected representatives; and for connected purposes.
- Introduced by: Adam Price MP (Commons)

Status: Not passed

The Misrepresentation of the People Act was a proposed Act of Parliament in the UK. The Bill had its first reading in the House of Commons on 17 October 2007; its failed second reading and first vote was on 19 October 2007. 37 of 646 MPs supported the bill. The bill resulted from The Ministry of Truth, an 11 October 2007 BBC television documentary by Richard Symons in the Why democracy? season. Various experts in the field of politics were asked about the possibility of legally prosecuting politicians for lying (in their function), so they could be barred from ever representing the people as politicians again. Various members of Parliament were asked if they would put this act before Parliament, and one, Adam Price, agreed. Many others agreed to the principle, but not the method. The original 'cheeky' title had to be adapted to Elected Representatives (Prohibition of Deception) Bill 2006–07 for introduction to Parliament. The long title was A Bill to create offences in relation to the publication of false or misleading statements by elected representatives; and for connected purposes. The content was, however, left largely intact.

== Principles ==
The documentary started with four principles:

- We, the people, are sovereign
- We grant this sovereignty to our elected representatives in Parliament (we are their employers)
- Our elected representatives have a fundamental obligation to be honest
- We are entitled to formal legal independent redress

== Opinions ==
Among the interviewees, there was general consent to the first three points, but not the fourth. There were several objections and counterarguments:

- You can't have a law against lying.
  - But there already are such laws, such as the Trade Descriptions Act 1968, the Control of Misleading Advertisements Regulations 1988 (SI 1988/915) and the Property Misdescriptions Act 1991.
- There is already a means of control in place – if ministers mislead it's the end of their career.
  - But the documentary gives several examples of ministers who first lost their jobs for such reasons, but then got another one in politics soon after. And voting out lying ministers or MPs through the following elections can only be done once every four years, when one can't vote out a specific person. Besides, between government spin and trial by media, how can we possibly know the truth we need to judge them? Anyway, if you get burgled, you don't go to the press, you go to the police. One member of Parliament, however, stated that the press should be held accountable for the lies they tell.
- There is already plenty of self-regulation.
  - But this is done through a process in which the prime minister is both judge and jury.
- Members of Parliament can ask questions.
  - But the ministers are not obliged to answer, and most of the time give evasive answers. And the party whip is far too powerful.
- You can't give power over to people who are less accountable than parliament.
  - But that has already been done, in the cash for honours scandal.
- It would violate the principles of the parliamentary system.
  - Harriet Harman argued that it would give the legislative branch of the government a tool to remove any politician from Parliament they wish. With this bill the judiciary could in practice dissolve British democracy and seize power.
