= Trade mark law of the European Union =

Trade mark law of the European Union is governed by European Union law together with national law within those countries which are also member states of the European Union. Trade marks may be registered within individual countries, or across the whole of the EU (by means of a European Union trade mark). In the case of a European Trademark is granted a unitary character that applies protection for that mark across the whole of the EU with certain exceptions. Exceptions include but not limited to: specific language conflicts in a particular reason (see the "Combit" v "Commit" case for example) as well as the case where there was a previously granted national trademark that would conflict in the case of a given EUTM (article 138 Regulation (EU) 2017/1001).

Within EU member states, national law implements directives so that the law governing national registrations in each jurisdiction is more or less equivalent; the eventual goal is harmonisation of trade mark law within the EU. The Benelux countries have introduced a common trade mark applying in their countries, abolishing their national trade marks.

Certain aspects of law do vary on a country by country basis within the EU, such as the protection for unregistered trade marks within the United Kingdom under the common law tort of "passing off", and the inclusion of provisions relating to honest concurrent use into UK national trade mark law (which have their basis in the 1938 UK legislation rather than the Directive which led to the drafting of the UK Trade Marks Act 1994).

Internal market legislation also largely applies to the non-EU countries in the European Economic Area. The WIPO-controlled Madrid system which applies in several countries provides a means of streamlining applications on a national level via a single international registration which may have effect in several countries, as designated by the applicant.

== See also ==
- Category:Trademark law by jurisdiction
- Copyright law of the European Union
- European patent law
