= Iceland v Iceland Foods Ltd =

2016 trademark and intellectual property dispute

Iceland v Iceland Foods Ltd was a legal dispute between the Icelandic government and the British supermarket chain Iceland Foods over the trademark, intellectual property rights, and use of the name "Iceland".

The case was settled after the supermarket chain dropped the trademark dispute after their third loss in 2026.

== Background ==
Trademark law already mandates some strict restrictions based on nationality in accordance with Article 3(2) of the EU Trademark Directive and Article 6 of the Paris Convention in that national flags and emblems cannot be registered as trademarks. However, there is no obstacle in law to stop the name of a country becoming a trademark itself.

Iceland Foods is a British supermarket chain founded in 1970 by Malcolm Walker and Peter Hinchcliffe in Oswestry, Shropshire, England. Its name is derived from its main offering, frozen food. Iceland Foods first applied to the European Union to trademark its name in 2002, and after several attempts was finally granted it in 2014, despite the opposition of the country of Iceland.

In 2015, Iceland Foods opposed an EU trademark application for 'Inspired by Iceland' submitted by Business Iceland (known in Icelandic as Íslandsstofa). The company sought to prevent the use of the phrase 'Inspired by Iceland' as a brand on Icelandic food products. It was initially assumed this was because the trademark was its own commercial entity, but the neutral wording of the phrase suggested that Iceland Foods was in fact objecting to the simple use of the name "Iceland". The Icelandic government accused Iceland Foods of engaging in abusive behaviour by trademarking the name of the country, and of "harass[ing] Icelandic companies and even the Icelandic tourism board" by pursuing legal action against Icelandic companies which use the name of their country in their trading names.

== Details ==
After considering legal action in September 2016, in November 2016, the Icelandic government filed a legal challenge at the European Union Intellectual Property Office (EUIPO) to have the company's trademark invalidated "on the basis that the term 'Iceland' is exceptionally broad and ambiguous in definition, often rendering the country's firms unable to describe their products as Icelandic". The Iceland Magazine noted that "Iceland Foods was founded in 1970, but only acquired the Europe wide trademark registration of "Iceland" in 2005. According to the Sagas Iceland, the nation, [sic] was established in 874. It is an insult to common sense to maintain that the supermarket chain has a stronger claim to the trademark than the country".

In response the supermarket responded by stating that they regret the country's decision to take legal action and that they "do not believe that any serious confusion or conflict has ever arisen in the public mind, or is likely to do so." Furthermore, they had also accused the Icelandic government of being unwilling to negotiate a settlement despite their best attempts to do so and that the government made "unrealistic and unacceptable" demands.

In April 2019, the EUIPO invalidated the Iceland trademark. The ruling stated that the supermarket chain founded in 1970 "cannot reasonably trademark the name of a country that has been around since the 9th century".

On 9 September 2022, the EUIPO's Grand Board of Appeal held another hearing regarding the cancellation of the trademark, and the supermarket decided to return to court over the matter appealing the decision made in 2019. Iceland Foods' managing director Richard Walker said the supermarket will "vigorously defend its intellectual property rights", but in December 2022 the court reaffirmed the previous court's sharp limitations on Walker's use of "Iceland". In July 2025 the European Union’s General Court also affirmed the cancellation order.
