= Made in Germany =

Merchandise mark

Made in Germany is a merchandise mark indicating that a product has been manufactured in Germany.

== History ==
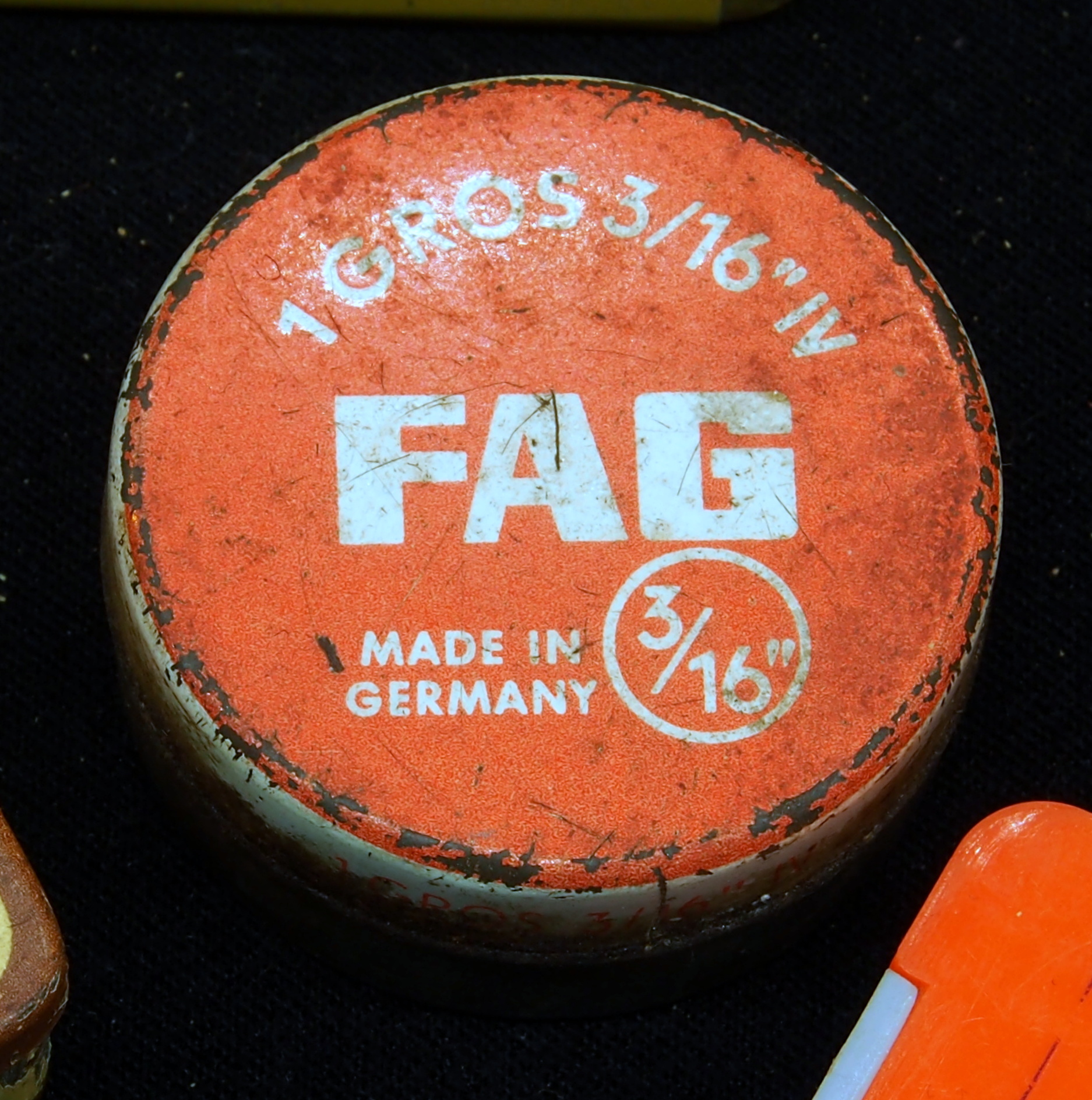
FAG (Fischers Aktien-Gesellschaft) metal tin

The label was introduced in Great Britain by the Merchandise Marks Act 1887 (50 & 51 Vict. c. 28), to mark foreign produce more obviously, as foreign manufactures had been falsely marking inferior goods with the marks of renowned British manufacturing companies and importing them into the United Kingdom. Most of these were found to be originating from Germany, whose government had introduced a protectionist policy to legally prohibit the import of goods in order to build up domestic industry (Merchandise Marks Act - Oxford University Press).

According to Professor Asaf Zussman, Stanford Institute for Economic Policy Research, in "The Rise of German Protectionism in the 1870s: A Macroeconomic Perspective", the "Rye and Iron" tariffs introduced by Bismarck's Germany in 1879 caused a major reduction of imports in order to protect Germany's industries. As a response, the Free-trade Liberal government in the UK introduced the Merchandise Marks act to allow consumers to be able to choose whether or not they would continue to purchase goods from protectionist economies.

Germany successfully leveraged the Made in Germany tag as a brand synonymous of product quality, durability and reliability.

"Made in Germany" is not controlled by a central regulatory body. However, its status has been defined by several court rulings in Germany. In 1973, the Bundesgerichtshof made a ruling that the label Made in Germany cannot be restricted to west German companies only. After this ruling, Made in West Germany was often used in Western Germany, while Made in GDR was used in eastern Germany. In 1995, the Oberlandesgericht Stuttgart ruled that the term Made in Germany is misleading according to Germany's Fair Trades Act when the largest part is not German raw materials or German craftsmanship.

== See also ==
- Country of origin
