= Patents Act 1949 =

Act of the Parliament of the United Kingdom

Patents Act 1949 (Note: Section 107(1).)
- Act of Parliament
- Parliament of the United Kingdom
- Long title: An Act to consolidate certain enactments relating to patents.
- Citation: 12, 13 & 14 Geo. 6. c. 87
- Territorial extent: United Kingdom

Dates
- Royal assent: 16 December 1949
- Commencement: 1 January 1950 (Note: Section 107(2).)

Other legislation
- Amends: See § Repealed enactments
- Repeals/revokes: See § Repealed enactments
- Amended by: Statute Law Revision Act 1953; Atomic Energy Authority Act 1954; Patents Act 1957; Defence Contracts Act 1958; Northern Ireland Act 1962; Industrial Expansion Act 1968; Administration of Justice Act 1969; Patents Act 1977; Semiconductor Products (Protection of Topography) Regulations 1987; Copyright, Designs and Patents Act 1988; Act of Sederunt (Rules of the Court of Session Amendment No.7) (Patents Rules) 1991; Trade Marks Act 1994; Arbitration Act 1996; Arbitration (Scotland) Act 2010 (Consequential Amendments) Order 2010
- Relates to: Patents and Designs Act 1949; Registered Designs Act 1949

Status: Partially repealed

Text of statute as originally enacted

Revised text of statute as amended

Text of the Patents Act 1949 as in force today (including any amendments) within the United Kingdom, from legislation.gov.uk.

The Patents Act 1949 (12, 13 & 14 Geo. 6. c. 87) is an act of the Parliament of the United Kingdom that consolidated certain enactments relating to patents.

== Provisions ==
=== Repealed enactments ===
Section 106 of the act repealed 11 enactments, listed in the second schedule to the act.

Citation	Short title	Extent of repeal
7 Edw. 7. c. 29	Patents and Designs Act 1907	The whole act, except section forty-seven, subsections (1), (2) and (3) of section sixty-two, sections sixty-three and sixty-four, and except sections eighty-two, ninety-one and ninety-one A in their application to trade marks and except section eighty-eight in its application to any Order in Council made under section ninety-one A.
9 & 10 Geo. 5. c. 80	Patents and Designs Act 1919	The whole act.
18 & 19 Geo. 5. c. 3	Patents and Designs (Convention) Act 1928	The whole act, except section four.
22 & 23 Geo. 5. c. 32	Patents and Designs Act 1932	The whole act, except so much of the Schedule as amends section ninety-one of the Patents and Designs Act 1907.
1 & 2 Geo. 6. c. 29	Patents, etc. (International Conventions) Act 1938	The whole act, except sections eight, nine and ten, subsection (6) of section twelve and so much of the Schedule as amends section ninety-one of the Patents and Designs Act 1907.
2 & 3 Geo. 6. c. 32	Patents and Designs (Limits of Time) Act 1939	The whole act, except section four.
5 & 6 Geo. 6. c. 6	Patents and Designs Act 1942	The whole act.
9 & 10 Geo. 6. c. 26	Emergency Laws (Transitional Provisions) Act 1946	Section seven.
9 & 10 Geo. 6. c. 44	Patents and Designs Act 1946	Sections one, two, three and five, subsection (3) of section six, subsection (2) of section seven and subsection (4) of section eight.
11 & 12 Geo. 6. c. 10	Emergency Laws (Miscellaneous Provisions) Act 1947	In section five, paragraph (b) of subsection (2) and subsection (3).
12 & 13 Geo. 6. c. 62	Patents and Designs Act 1949	The whole act, except section forty-nine and so much of the First Schedule as amends sections eighty-two, eighty-eight and ninety-one A of the Patents and Designs Act 1907.

== Subsequent developments ==
The Patents Act 1977 substantially superseded the 1949 Act by introducing a new patent regime for patents applied for from the appointed day. Section 127 of, and schedule 3 to, the 1977 act repealed six provisions of the 1949 act—sections 14, 32(3), 41, 42, 71 and 72—which had no equivalents in the new law. The remaining provisions of the 1949 act were preserved by schedule 1 to the 1977 act, which continued to apply them to existing patents and applications made before the appointed day.
