= Windsurfing Chiemsee Produktions v Boots =

Windsurfing Chiemsee Produktions v. Boots is a trademark law decision by the European Court of Justice (“ECJ”) ruling that geographic marks can be registered, as long as the public associates that mark with the trademark owner, and not merely with the geographic area. According to most systems of trademark law internationally, a mark that designates a geographic place is insufficiently distinctive, legally speaking.

== Background of the Case ==
The Chiemsee is the name of the largest lake in Bavaria, Germany. A company located close to the lake registered the trademark “Chiemsee” as a picture mark to be used in connection with sportswear under German law. A competitor also using a picture mark with the designation “Chiemsee” took objection to this, arguing that because the mark consisted of the name of the lake, it was unregistrable under Article 3(1)(c) of the Harmonization Directive because it was a “geographically descriptive” mark. The case reached the national court of last resort, which referred the question whether any and all registrations for geographically descriptive marks must be refused under the First Council Directive 89/104/EEC of December 21, 1988, to the ECJ.

== The Court’s Decision ==
The court did not accept the defendant’s argument that because the word “Chiemsee” is an indication that designates geographical origin, it must remain available for use by others. The court also did not simply allow for registration on the basis that the defendant was using a picture mark that looked different from the plaintiff’s picture mark.

Instead, the ECJ held that geographically descriptive marks are not categorically unregistrable, with the caveat that the registrant must show that consumers have come to associate the mark with the registrant’s products. This is in line with the American law on the subject, where the cases rely on evidence about consumer perceptions.

== Related Case ==
Procter & Gamble Co. v OHIM (the "Baby Dry" case) is a good counterpoint to Windsurfing Chiemsee. There, the ECJ allowed the mark to be registered based on a “synctactical change,” thus perhaps lowering the standard for trademark subject matter in the sense that there was no secondary meaning (consumer perception) requirement. Because “Baby Dry” was a “synctactically unusual juxtaposition” that was uncommon in the English language, the mark was distinctive, and therefore registrable despite the charge of descriptiveness contained in the initial rejection of the application.
