= Merchandise Marks Act 1887 =

Act of the Parliament of the United Kingdom

Merchandise Marks Act 1887 (Note: Section 1.)
- Act of Parliament
- Parliament of the United Kingdom
- Long title: An Act to consolidate and amend the Law relating to Fraudulent Marks on Merchandise.
- Citation: 50 & 51 Vict. c. 28
- Territorial extent: United Kingdom

Dates
- Royal assent: 23 August 1887
- Commencement: 23 August 1887 (Note: The Acts of Parliament (Commencement) Act 1793.)
- Repealed: 30 November 1968
Other legislation
Amends	Revenue Act 1883
Repeals/revokes	Merchandise Marks Act 1862
Amended by	Costs in Criminal Cases Act 1908; Perjury Act 1911; False Oaths (Scotland) Act 1933; Administration of Justice (Miscellaneous Provisions) Act 1933; Customs and Excise Act 1952; Magistrates' Courts Act 1952
Repealed by	Trade Descriptions Act 1968

Status: Repealed

Text of statute as originally enacted

The Merchandise Marks Act 1887 (50 & 51 Vict. c. 28) was an act of the Parliament of the United Kingdom.

The act stopped foreign manufacturers from falsely claiming that their goods were British-made and selling them in Britain and Europe on that pretence. It also makes it illegal for companies to falsely claim that they have a royal warrant.

Swiss watch cases imported to Britain before this date were of 875 millesimal fineness standard. (Note: Sometimes of 800 standard) This did not meet the 925 standard for sterling silver and so could not be hallmarked, as the new act required. The Swiss thus increased the fineness of their silver alloy. However they chose an alloy of 935, in excess of the sterling grade. This has sometimes been claimed to have arisen as a Swiss misunderstanding of the standard required for British Sterling. Such cases were marked in Switzerland with three Swiss bears. This persisted until 1907, when a requirement for hallmarking to be done in Britain, after which the Swiss changed to a 925 alloy.

== Provisions ==
=== Repealed enactments ===
Section 23 of the act repealed the Merchandise Marks Act 1862 (25 & 26 Vict. c. 88).

== Subsequent developments ==
The whole act was repealed by section 41(2) of, and the schedule 2 to, the Trade Descriptions Act 1968, which came into force on 30 November 1968.

== See also ==
- Made in Germany
