= Trade Marks Act 1994 =

Act of the Parliament of the United Kingdom

Trade Marks Act 1994 (Note: Section 110.)
- Act of Parliament
- Parliament of the United Kingdom
- Long title: An Act to make new provision for registered trade marks, implementing Council Directive No. 89/104/EEC of 21st December 1988 to approximate the laws of the Member States relating to trade marks; to make provision in connection with Council Regulation (EC) No. 40/94 of 20th December 1993 on the Community trade mark; to give effect to the Madrid Protocol Relating to the International Registration of Marks of 27th June 1989, and to certain provisions of the Paris Convention for the Protection of Industrial Property of 20th March 1883, as revised and amended; and for connected purposes.
- Citation: 1994 c. 26
- Territorial extent: England and Wales; Scotland; Northern Ireland; Isle of Man; (Note: Section 108.)

Dates
- Royal assent: 21 July 1994
- Commencement: 29 September 1994 (in part); 31 October 1994 (rest of act); (Note: Section 109. The Trade Marks Act 1994 (Commencement) Order 1994)

Other legislation
- Amends: Patents and Designs Act 1907; Patents Act 1949; Solicitors Act 1974; House of Commons Disqualification Act 1975; Restrictive Trade Practices Act 1976; Judicature (Northern Ireland) Act 1978; Civil Jurisdiction and Judgments Act 1982; Law Reform (Miscellaneous Provisions) (Scotland) Act 1985
- Repeals/revokes: Trade Marks Act 1938; Trade Marks (Amendment) Act 1984
- Amended by: Statute Law (Repeals) Act 2004; Digital Markets, Competition and Consumers Act 2024

Status: Amended

Text of statute as originally enacted

Revised text of statute as amended

Text of the Trade Marks Act 1994 as in force today (including any amendments) within the United Kingdom, from legislation.gov.uk.

The Trade Marks Act 1994 (c. 26) is an act of the Parliament of the United Kingdom governing trade marks within the United Kingdom and the Isle of Man. It implements EU Directive No. 89/104/EEC (The Trade Marks Directive) which forms the framework for the trade mark laws of all EU member states, and replaced an earlier law, the Trade Marks Act 1938 (1 & 2 Geo. 6. c. 22). Although the UK's trade mark regime covers the Isle of Man, it does not extend to the Channel Islands which have their own trade mark registers.

The act provides both civil and criminal law sanctions for the misuse of registered trade marks. Section 93 of the act makes enforcement of the criminal sanctions the duty of the local Weights and Measures Authority (usually the Trading Standards department) and imports enforcement powers from the Trade Descriptions Act.

Similar criminal law provisions are written into the related Copyright Designs and Patents Act.

The UK Patent Office, which deals with trade mark registration, has recently implemented a national intelligence database, TellPat, which is available to enforcement officers.

== Trade mark definition/eligibility ==
Section 1(1) (as of 14th Jan 2019) defines a trade mark as:

"any sign which is capable—a) of being represented in the register in a manner which enables the register and other competent authorities and the public to determine the clear and precise subject matter of the protection afforded to the proprietor, and b) of distinguishing goods or services of one undertaking from those of other undertakings."

A trade mark may, in particular, consist of words (including personal names), designs, letters, numerals, colors, sounds, the shape of goods, or their packaging.

=== Judicial interpretation of Section 1(1) ===
- Société des Produits Nestlé S.A. v. Cadbury UK Limited [2013]
  The Court of Appeal decided that Cadbury's attempts to register a specific shade of purple (Pantone 2684C) was not able to be registered as a trade mark. They reasoned that the marks description, meaning "the predominant colour applied to the whole visible surface of the packaging of the goods," did not satisfy the requirement of a sign or the requirement of the graphical representation of a sign within the meaning of Article 2 of the Trade Marks Directive 2008/95/EC.
- Ralf Sieckmann v Deutsches Patent und Markenamt [2002]
  This is the leading authority on the graphical representation of non-conventional trademarks under the European Trade Marks Directive. Sieckmann were unsuccessful in their registration of a “methyl cinnamate” scent described as “balsamically fruity with a hint of cinnamon.” The court ruled that the chemical formula was not acceptable as a graphic representation for the purposes of the directive. Additionally, a written description of the smell and formula was not sufficiently clear and precise and objective to constitute a graphical representation. The judicial remarks later become known as the "Sieckmann criteria or Sieckmann Seven." These state that a sign must be, clear, precise, self-contained, easily accessible, intelligible, durable, and objective.
- Case R 708/2006 Edgar Rice Burroughs Inc [2007]
  This concerned Edgar Rice Burroughs application to trade mark Tarzan's scream. The application included a picture of the sound spectrum of the character's yell. The Office for Harmonisation in the Internal Market (OHIM) refused the application on appeal. The sound spectrum of the character's scream did not amount to sufficient graphical representation of the mark.
- Red Bull v EUIPO [2017] (Red Bull case)
  This decision of the EU general court concerned two trade mark registrations for energy drinks using the color combination of Blue and Silver. The court held the marks were not sufficiently precise as the mere juxtaposition of two colors (blue and silver) would allow for numerous color combinations.

== Exclusions from trade mark protection ==
Section 3(1), Section 3(2) and Section 3(3) set out absolute grounds for refusal of trade mark registration.

Section 3(1) states that the following shall not be registered — a) signs which do not satisfy the requirements of section 1(1), b) trade marks which are devoid of any distinctive character, c) trade marks which consist exclusively of signs or indications which may serve, in trade, to designate the kind, quality, quantity, intended purpose, value, geographical origin, the time of production of goods or of rendering of services, or other characteristics of goods or services, d) trade marks which consist exclusively of signs or indications which have become customary in the current language or in the bona fide and established practices of the trade.

Section 3(1) also contains a proviso that states: a trade mark shall not be refused registration by virtue of paragraph (b), (c) or (d) above if before the date of the application it has in fact acquired a distinctive character as a result of the use made of it.

Section 3(2) states that a sign shall not be registered as a trade mark if it consists exclusively of — a) the shape (or other characteristic), which results from the nature of the goods themselves, b) the shape (or other characteristic), of goods which are necessary to a obtain a technical result, c) the shape (or other characteristic), which gives substantial value to the goods.

Section 3(3) states that a trade mark is not registrable if it is — a) contrary to public policy or morality or b) of such nature to deceive the public (deceptive marks)

Section 3(4) states that a trade mark shall not be registered— if or to the extent that its use is prohibited in the United Kingdom by any enactment or rule of law or by any provision of EU law.

Section 3(5) states a trade mark shall not be registered in the cases specified, or referred to, in section 4 (specially protected emblems).

Section 3(6) states a trade mark shall not be registered if or to the extent that the application is made in bad faith.

=== Judicial interpretation of section 3 ===
- Kit Kat case [2018]
  This case concerned the application of Section 3(1) to Nestle's four-fingered chocolate bar the 'Kit Kat'. The key issue was whether Nestlé had sufficiently demonstrated that the Kit Kat-shaped mark had acquired distinctive character throughout the EU. The Court of Justice of the European Union held that Nestle only produced evidence relevant to some not all of the member states— consequentially they had failed to show that the Kit Kat shared mark had acquired distinctiveness throughout the EU. The result of this is the mark was not granted trade mark protection.
- Christian Louboutin v Van Haren Schoenen BV [2018]
  This case concerned the application of Article 3(1)(e)(iii) of the EU Directive No. 89/104/EEC (Incorporated into UK law via Section 3(2)(c). The question asked of the Court of Justice of the European Union was whether the concept of shape contained in Article 3(1)(e)(iii) of the directive was limited to three dimensional characteristics of goods or whether it would pertain to other marks such as colors. The court held that the red sign (Pantone 18 1663TP ) did not consist exclusively of a shape which gave substantial value to the goods which meant the mark was valid. In other words, the contour of the Louboutin designed sole was only intended to show the positional orientation of the mark (the colour red) and was not part of the trade mark application itself.

== Changes from 1938 act ==
The introduction of new primary legislation for trade marks in 1994 enabled the government to make a number of changes beyond merely implementing the EU directive. These include:

- Removing the two-part registration system: under the Trade Marks Act 1938 (1 & 2 Geo. 6. c. 22), trademarks were registered into two distinct parts (Part A and B) with different distinctiveness requirements.
- Allowing applications to multiple classes.
- Ensuring the registration requirements for goods and services are as similar as possible.

The act also provides for a defence of "honest" use of a natural name.

== See also ==
- United Kingdom trade mark law
- Trade mark law of the European Union
- Passing off
