= Registered Designs Act 1949 =

Act of the Parliament of the United Kingdom

Registered Designs Act 1949 (Note: Section 49(1).)
- Act of Parliament
- Parliament of the United Kingdom
- Long title: An Act to consolidate certain enactments relating to registered designs.
- Citation: 12, 13 & 14 Geo. 6. c. 88
- Territorial extent: United Kingdom

Dates
- Royal assent: 16 December 1949
- Commencement: 1 January 1950 (Note: Section 49(2).)
Other legislation
Amends	See § Repealed enactments
Repeals/revokes	See § Repealed enactments
Amended by	Statute Law Revision Act 1953; Copyright Act 1956; Defence Contracts Act 1958; Northern Ireland Act 1962; Visiting Forces and International Headquarters (Application of Law) Order 1965; Atomic Energy Authority (Weapons Group) Act 1973; British Telecommunications Act 1981; Statute Law (Repeals) Act 1986; Patents, Designs and Marks Act 1986; Semiconductor Products (Protection of Topography) Regulations 1987; Copyright, Designs and Patents Act 1988; Youth Justice and Criminal Evidence Act 1999; Registered Designs Regulations 2001; Enterprise Act 2002; Enterprise Act 2002 (Protection of Legitimate Interests) Order 2003; Constitutional Reform Act 2005; Community Design Regulations 2005; Regulatory Reform (Registered Designs) Order 2006; Registered Designs Act 1949 and Patents Act 1977 (Electronic Communications) Order 2006; Intellectual Property (Enforcement, etc.) Regulations 2006; Intellectual Property Act 2014; Intellectual Property Act 2014 (Amendment) Regulations 2014; Enterprise and Regulatory Reform Act 2013 (Competition) (Consequential, Transitional and Saving Provisions) Order 2014; Consumer Rights Act 2015; Intellectual Property (Unjustified Threats) Act 2017; Digital Economy Act 2017; Designs and International Trade Marks (Amendment etc.) (EU Exit) Regulations 2019; Intellectual Property (Amendment etc.) (EU Exit) Regulations 2020; Intellectual Property (Exhaustion of Rights) (Amendment) Regulations 2023
Relates to	Patents Act 1949

Status: Amended

Text of statute as originally enacted

Revised text of statute as amended

Text of the Registered Designs Act 1949 as in force today (including any amendments) within the United Kingdom, from legislation.gov.uk.

The Registered Designs Act 1949 (12, 13 & 14 Geo. 6. c. 88) is an act of the Parliament of the United Kingdom concerning design rights. The purpose of the act was to consolidate certain enactments relating to registering designs. "The Act prescribes that where an application for the registration of a design has been abandoned or refused, information filed in pursuance of the registration shall not be open to public inspection".

Part IV of the Copyright, Designs and Patents Act 1988 contains a certain number of amendments to the Registered Designs Act 1949.

== Provisions ==
=== Repealed enactments ===
Section 48 of the act repealed 11 enactments, listed in the second schedule to the act.

Citation	Short title	Extent of repeal
7 Edw. 7. c. 29	Patents and Designs Act 1907	The whole act, except section forty-seven, subsections (1), (2) and (3) of section sixty-two, sections sixty-three and sixty-four, and except sections eighty-two, ninety-one and ninety-one A in their application to trade marks and except section eighty-eight in its application to any Order in Council made under section ninety-one A.
9 & 10 Geo. 5. c. 80	Patents and Designs Act 1919	The whole act.
18 & 19 Geo. 5. c. 3	Patents and Designs (Convention) Act 1928	The whole act, except section four.
22 & 23 Geo. 5. c. 32	Patents and Designs Act 1932	The whole act, except so much of the Schedule as amends section ninety-one of the Patents and Designs Act 1907.
1 & 2 Geo. 6. c. 29	Patents, etc. (International Conventions) Act 1938	The whole act, except sections eight, nine and ten, subsection (6) of section twelve and so much of the Schedule as amends section ninety-one of the Patents and Designs Act 1907.
2 & 3 Geo. 6. c. 32	Patents and Designs (Limits of Time) Act 1939	The whole act, except section four.
5 & 6 Geo. 6. c. 6	Patents and Designs Act 1942	The whole act.
9 & 10 Geo. 6. c. 26	Emergency Laws (Transitional Provisions) Act 1946	Section seven.
9 & 10 Geo. 6. c. 44	Patents and Designs Act 1946	Sections one, two, three and five, subsection (3) of section six, subsection (2) of section seven and subsection (4) of section eight.
11 & 12 Geo. 6. c. 10	Emergency Laws (Miscellaneous Provisions) Act 1947	In section five, paragraph (b) of subsection (2) and subsection (3).
12 & 13 Geo. 6. c. 62	Patents and Designs Act 1949	The whole act, except section forty-nine and so much of the First Schedule as amends sections eighty-two, eighty-eight and ninety-one A of the Patents and Designs Act 1907.

== Registrable designs and proceedings for registration ==
A design which complies with the conditions mentioned in article 1 of CDR.
