= United Kingdom trade mark law =

United Kingdom trade mark law provides protection for the use of trade marks in the UK. A trade mark is a way for one party to distinguish themselves from another. In the business world, a trade mark provides a product or organisation with an identity which cannot be imitated by its competitors.

A trade mark can be a name, word, phrase, logo, symbol, design, image, sound, shape, signature or any combination of these elements. In UK law, as in most common law countries other than the United States and Canada, the term is written as "trade mark" (as in the Trade Marks Act 1994), not "trademark".

== Conferred rights ==
The owners of a trade mark can legally defend their mark against infringements. To do so, the trade mark must either be registered, or have been used for a period of time so that it has acquired local distinctiveness (Prior Rights).

The extent to which a trade mark is defendable depends upon the similarity of the trade marks involved, the similarity of the products or services involved and whether the trademark has acquired distinctiveness.

A registered trade mark is relatively simple to defend in a court of law. An unregistered trade mark relies on the law of passing off (where one party's goods or services are presented in a way that causes confusion between them and the goods or services of another party).

Rights have also been recently extended with regard to well-known trade marks.

The Trade Marks Act 1994 states that "a person infringes a registered trade mark if he uses in the course of trade a sign which is identical with the trade mark in relation to goods or services which are identical with those for which it is registered". A person may also infringe a registered trade mark where the sign is similar and the goods or services are similar to those for which the mark is registered and there is a likelihood of confusion on the part of the public as a result.

A person also infringes a registered trade mark if he uses in the course of trade a sign which is identical with or similar to the mark, if the trade mark has a reputation in the UK, and its use without due cause takes unfair advantage of, or is detrimental to, the mark's distinctive character or reputation.

== Registering trade marks ==
The registration of trade marks in the UK is achieved through the UK Intellectual Property Office (UKIPO). If registration is accepted by the UKIPO, a number of exclusive rights are bestowed upon the trade mark owner. These rights allow the owner to prevent unauthorised use of the mark on products that are identical or similar to the registered mark.

When a trade mark application is made to the UKIPO, it examines the application to decide whether the trade mark that is being applied for is distinctive enough to be a trade mark. Registration usually takes about three and a half to four months. However, this time span can be greatly increased if any objections are raised to the mark's registration by owners of similar registered trade marks or by the UKIPO themselves. Once a trademark is registered, it is kept on the register for ten years, after which it needs to be renewed to preserve the owner's rights over it. It can also be allowed to lapse.

Trade marks are registered in one or more of 45 classes. There are 34 classes of goods and 11 for services. These classes group products that are deemed to be similar in function, and are identified by their number. For example, the registration of a trade mark for a range of gymnastic and sporting articles is classified by the trademark registry in "class 28".

== Registrability of a trade mark ==
Some of the main objections that the UKIPO will make when trademarks are submitted for registration are usually related to the "distinctiveness" of the mark. An inherently distinctive mark is the easiest to register, as it has no prior meaning. These marks are not to be found in dictionaries. A good example of such a distinctive trademark is iPod.

Words that appear in the dictionary can still be registered. These arbitrary trademarks are meaningless in the context of their use. For example, Apple Computer, or Apple Corps.

Suggestive trade marks do not describe a characteristic of the product, but with some imagination, are identifiable with their connected product. For example, ColdSeal Windows.

Descriptive trade marks use words that appear in the dictionary that describe the product to which they relate. They are usually difficult to register, and the registrar needs to prove that the mark has become distinctive through its long term use. Descriptive marks can be made distinctive by the addition of other elements to the name or logo.

== Acquired distinctiveness ==
A descriptive trade mark can only be registered if it has "acquired distinctiveness". This is achievable through its use, although proving that "acquired distinctiveness" has been achieved usually relies on sales figures and advertising budgets.

== Registration exclusions ==
Most countries exclude certain terms and symbols from being registrable. These include emblems, flags, royal insignia, and the rings of the Olympic Games. In addition, marks that are deceptive as to the country of the product's origin and marks that are obscene are unregistrable.

== Historical legislation ==
Merchandise Marks Act 1862 (Note: Section 26.)
- Act of Parliament
- Parliament of the United Kingdom
- Long title: An Act to amend the Law relating to the fraudulent marking of Merchandise.
- Citation: 25 & 26 Vict. c. 88
- Territorial extent: United Kingdom

Dates
- Royal assent: 7 August 1862
- Commencement: 7 August 1862 (Note: The Acts of Parliament (Commencement) Act 1793.)
- Repealed: 23 August 1887
Other legislation
Repealed by	Merchandise Marks Act 1887

Status: Repealed

Text of statute as originally enacted

The Merchandise Marks Act 1862 (25 & 26 Vict. c. 88) made it a criminal offence to imitate another's trade mark "with intent to defraud or to enable another to defraud".

Trade Marks Registration Act 1875 (Note: Section 11.)
- Act of Parliament
- Parliament of the United Kingdom
- Long title: An Act to establish a Register of Trade Marks.
- Citation: 38 & 39 Vict. c. 91
- Territorial extent: United Kingdom

Dates
- Royal assent: 13 August 1875
- Commencement: 1 January 1876 (Note: Section 7.)
- Repealed: 1 January 1884
Other legislation
Repealed by	Patents, Designs, and Trade Marks Act 1883

Status: Repealed

Text of statute as originally enacted

The Trade Marks Registration Act 1875 (38 & 39 Vict. c. 91) was passed which allowed formal registration of trade marks at the UK Patent Office for the first time. Registration was considered to comprise prima facie evidence of ownership of a trade mark and registration of marks began on 1 January 1876. The first trade mark to be so registered was the red triangle of the Bass Brewery. The 1875 act defined a registrable trade mark as "a device, or mark, or name of an individual or firm printed in some particular and distinctive manner; or a written signature or copy of a written signature of an individual or firm; or a distinctive label or ticket". However, any word or name that was in use as a trade mark before the passing of the Act (in August 1875) was entitled to registration, whether or not the mark fulfilled these criteria.

Trade Marks Act 1914 (Note: Section 3.)
- Act of Parliament
- Parliament of the United Kingdom
- Long title: An Act to amend section sixty-four of the Trade Marks Act, 1905.
- Citation: 4 & 5 Geo. 5. c. 16
- Territorial extent: United Kingdom

Dates
- Royal assent: 7 August 1914
- Commencement: 7 August 1914 (Note: The Acts of Parliament (Commencement) Act 1793.)
- Repealed: 27 July 1938
Other legislation
Amends	Trade Marks Act 1905
Repealed by	Trade Marks (Amendment) Act 1937

Status: Repealed

Text of statute as originally enacted

Trade Marks Act 1919 (Note: Section 13(1).)
- Act of Parliament
- Parliament of the United Kingdom
- Long title: An Act to amend the Trade Marks Act, 1905.
- Citation: 9 & 10 Geo. 5. c. 79
- Territorial extent: United Kingdom

Dates
- Royal assent: 23 December 1919
- Commencement: 1 April 1920 (Note: Section 13(2).)
- Repealed: 27 July 1938
Other legislation
Amends	Trade Marks Act 1905
Repealed by	Statute Law Revision Act 1927; Trade Marks (Amendment) Act 1937; Trade Marks Act 1938

Status: Repealed

Text of statute as originally enacted

Trade Marks (Amendment) Act 1937 (Note: Section 33(1).)
- Act of Parliament
- Parliament of the United Kingdom
- Long title: An Act to amend the law relating to trade marks.
- Citation: 1 Edw. 8. & 1 Geo. 6. c. 49
- Territorial extent: United Kingdom

Dates
- Royal assent: 13 July 1937
- Commencement: 27 July 1938 (Note: Section 33(5).)
- Repealed: 27 July 1938
Other legislation
Amends	Trade Marks Act 1905; Trade Marks Act 1919
Repeals/revokes	Trade Marks Act 1914
Repealed by	Trade Marks Act 1938

Status: Repealed

Text of statute as originally enacted

The Patents, Designs, and Trade Marks Act 1883 (46 & 47 Vict. c. 57) substantially revised trade mark law, reducing the cost of application, and included the facility to register "fancy words not in common use" and "brands" as new marks for the first time. Further major trademark acts were passed; the Patents, Designs, and Trade Marks (Amendment) Act 1885 (48 & 49 Vict. c. 63) and the Trade Marks Act 1905 (5 Edw. 7. c. 15) (which both further refined definitions of a trade mark), the Trade Marks Act 1914 (4 & 5 Geo. 5. c. 16), the Trade Marks Act 1919 (9 & 10 Geo. 5. c. 79) (which separated the trade mark register into Parts A and B, each of which had different registration criteria), the Trade Marks (Amendment) Act 1937 (1 Edw. 8. & 1 Geo. 6. c. 49) and the Trade Marks Act 1938 (1 & 2 Geo. 6. c. 22), which remained in force until it was superseded by the Trade Marks Act 1994 (c. 26).

== Recent legislation ==
The current UK Trade Mark legislation is the Trade Marks Act 1994, which implements the European Trade Marks Directive into national law.

The UK Intellectual Property Office radically altered the way UK national trade mark applications were examined in October 2007. Previously, UK national trade mark applications underwent a full examination both on absolute (distinctiveness) and relative (prior rights) grounds. In October 2007, the search which formed a part of the examination of applications on prior rights grounds became an advisory search in a similar fashion to the Community Trade Mark system, bringing into force Section 8 of the Trade Marks Act 1994. No longer will the UKIPO unilaterally be able to prevent the grant of a UK national trade mark application on the basis of an earlier pending application or prior registration for a conflicting mark. Instead, it will be up to the proprietor of that right to oppose the application when it advertised for opposition purposes, although the UKIPO will still advise owners of conflicting application where citations including their marks have been sent to the applicant to assist them in making an opposition.

A fast-track application process has also been available to applicants since 7 April 2008.

Aspects of UK common law also relate to trade marks, most notably the common law tort of passing off.

=== Exit from the European Union ===
As a significant quantity of UK trade mark legislation and jurisprudence is derived from EU trade mark law, the operation of trade mark law post-Brexit is preserved through the European Union (Withdrawal) Act 2018 and the European Union (Withdrawal Agreement) Act 2020.

Since 1 January 2021, new EU trade marks are no longer automatically recognised in the UK. EU trade mark holders from before the Brexit implementation period have been granted a UK trade mark, but new EU trademarks must now be registered separately in the UK.

== See also ==
- Trade mark law of the European Union
- Company Names Tribunal
