= Design right (United Kingdom) =

Legal protection for 3D designs in the UK

Design right is a sui generis intellectual property right in British law. There are two types of design rights: the registered design right (Registered Designs Act 1949) and the unregistered design right.

Unregistered design rights protect only the shape of a three-dimensional design. It subsists if the design is recorded on paper, or if an article has been made according to that design. It does not subsist in designs made before the commencement of part of the 1988 Act relevant to design right. It has rules on qualification for protection by both citizenship of the designer and place of the designing. Qualifying countries include the United Kingdom, the rest of the European Economic Area and British overseas territories.

The registered design right provides up to 25 years protection. The unregistered design right is similar to copyright in that it attaches automatically when a new design is created. However, its length is much more limited, since it only lasts for 10 years after it was first sold or 15 years after it was created - whichever is earliest. It was introduced into British law by the Copyright, Designs and Patents Act 1988 (the 1988 Act). In comparison, the Community unregistered design right lasts for three years from the date on which the design is first made available to the public in the EU.

Design right does not subsist in parts of a design necessary to connect to another article, to surface decoration, to methods and principles of construction or to those parts of a design which are dependent on the appearance of another article, where that article and the article that design right applies to is an integral part of the second article. Design right also does not apply if a design is not original, and a design is defined as not being original if the object so designed is commonplace in the field when designed.

Following the exit from the European Union on 1 January 2021, the UK also established a supplementary unregistered design right that lasts for three years from first disclosure in the UK. This mirrors the European Community unregistered design rights, and offers some protection to surface decoration from copying.

== Design right legislation ==
=== Original Act ===
- Copyright, Designs and Patents Act 1988

=== Rules made under the original Act ===
- The Design Right (Proceedings before Comptroller) Rules 1989
- The Design Right (Proceedings before Comptroller) (Amendment) Rules 1992
