= List of acts of the Parliament of the United Kingdom from 1919 =

This is a complete list of acts of the Parliament of the United Kingdom for the year 1919.

Note that the first parliament of the United Kingdom was held in 1801; parliaments between 1707 and 1800 were either parliaments of Great Britain or of Ireland). For acts passed up until 1707, see the list of acts of the Parliament of England and the list of acts of the Parliament of Scotland. For acts passed from 1707 to 1800, see the list of acts of the Parliament of Great Britain. See also the list of acts of the Parliament of Ireland.

For acts of the devolved parliaments and assemblies in the United Kingdom, see the list of acts of the Scottish Parliament, the list of acts of the Northern Ireland Assembly, and the list of acts and measures of Senedd Cymru; see also the list of acts of the Parliament of Northern Ireland.

The number shown after each act's title is its chapter number. Acts passed before 1963 are cited using this number, preceded by the year(s) of the reign during which the relevant parliamentary session was held; thus the Union with Ireland Act 1800 is cited as "39 & 40 Geo. 3. c. 67", meaning the 67th act passed during the session that started in the 39th year of the reign of George III and which finished in the 40th year of that reign. Note that the modern convention is to use Arabic numerals in citations (thus "41 Geo. 3" rather than "41 Geo. III"). Acts of the last session of the Parliament of Great Britain and the first session of the Parliament of the United Kingdom are both cited as "41 Geo. 3". Acts passed from 1963 onwards are simply cited by calendar year and chapter number.

== 9 & 10 Geo. 5 ==
The first session of the 31st Parliament of the United Kingdom, which met from 4 February 1919 until 23 December 1919.

This session was also traditionally cited as 9 & 10 G. 5.

=== Public general acts ===
Short title	Citation	Royal assent
Long title
Coal Industry Commission Act 1919 (repealed)	9 & 10 Geo. 5. c. 1	26 February 1919
An Act to constitute a Commission to inquire into the position of and conditions prevailing in the Coal Industry. (Repealed by Statute Law Revision Act 1927 (17 & 18 Geo. 5. c. 42))
Re-election of Ministers Act 1919 (repealed)	9 & 10 Geo. 5. c. 2	27 February 1919
An Act to make provision for restricting the necessity of the re-election of Members of the House of Commons on acceptance of office, and to make provision as to the right of certain Ministers to sit in the House of Commons. (Repealed by House of Commons Disqualification Act 1957 (5 & 6 Eliz. 2. c. 20))
Air Navigation Act 1919 (repealed)	9 & 10 Geo. 5. c. 3	27 February 1919
An Act to make temporary provision for the regulation of Air Navigation and for purposes connected therewith. (Repealed by Air Navigation Act 1920 (10 & 11 Geo. 5. c. 80))
Summons and Process Servers' Fees (Ireland) Act 1919 (repealed)	9 & 10 Geo. 5. c. 4	28 March 1919
An Act to prescribe the fees that may be charged for service of justices' summonses and county court processes in Ireland. (Repealed by Summary Jurisdiction Act (Northern Ireland) 1953 (c. 3 (N.I.)) and County Courts (Amendment) Act (Northern Ireland) 1958 (c. 5 (N.I.)))
Consolidated Fund (No. 1) Act 1919 (repealed)	9 & 10 Geo. 5. c. 5	28 March 1919
An Act to apply certain sums out of the Consolidated Fund to the service of the years ending on the thirty-first day of March one thousand nine hundred and nineteen and one thousand nine hundred and twenty. (Repealed by Statute Law Revision Act 1927 (17 & 18 Geo. 5. c. 42))
Civil Contingencies Fund Act 1919 (repealed)	9 & 10 Geo. 5. c. 6	28 March 1919
An Act to authorise the issue of certain sums out of the Consolidated Fund to the Civil Contingencies Fund; and to make further provision in connexion therewith. (Repealed by Statute Law Revision Act 1927 (17 & 18 Geo. 5. c. 42))
Increase of Rent and Mortgage Interest (Restrictions) Act 1919 (repealed)	9 & 10 Geo. 5. c. 7	2 April 1919
An Act to extend, amend and prolong the duration of the Increase of Rent and Mortgage Interest (War Restrictions) Act, 1915, (Note: Increase of Rent and Mortgage Interest (War Restrictions) Act 1915 (5 & 6 Geo. 5. c. 97)) and the enactments amending that Act. (Repealed for the United Kingdom by Increase of Rent and Mortgage Interest (Restrictions) Act 1920 (10 & 11 Geo. 5. c. 17) and for the Isle of Man by Statute Law (Repeals) Act 2004 (c. 14))
Representation of the People (Returning Officers' Expenses) Act 1919 (repealed)	9 & 10 Geo. 5. c. 8	16 April 1919
An Act to amend the Representation of the People Act, 1918, (Note: Representation of the People Act 1918 (7 & 8 Geo. 5. c. 64)) with respect to the mode of payment of the charges of returning officers. (Repealed by Representation of the People Act 1948 (11 & 12 Geo. 6. c. 65))
Intestate Husband's Estate (Scotland) Act 1919 (repealed)	9 & 10 Geo. 5. c. 9	16 April 1919
An Act to amend and regulate procedure under the Intestate Husband's Estate (Scotland) Act, 1911. (Note: Intestate Husband's Estate (Scotland) Act 1911 (1 & 2 Geo. 5. c. 10)) (Repealed by Succession (Scotland) Act 1964 (c. 41))
Parliamentary Elections (Soldiers) Act 1919 (repealed)	9 & 10 Geo. 5. c. 10	16 April 1919
An Act to repeal the Parliamentary Elections (Soldiers) Act, 1847. (Note: Parliamentary Elections (Soldiers) Act 1847 (10 & 11 Vict. c. 21)) (Repealed by Statute Law Revision Act 1927 (17 & 18 Geo. 5. c. 42))
Army (Annual) Act 1919 (repealed)	9 & 10 Geo. 5. c. 11	16 April 1919
An Act to provide, during Twelve Months, for the Discipline and Regulation of the Army. (Repealed by Statute Law Revision Act 1927 (17 & 18 Geo. 5. c. 42), Statute Law Revision Act 1950 (14 Geo. 6. c. 6) and Revision of the Army and Air Force Acts (Transitional Provisions) Act 1955 (3 & 4 Eliz. 2. c. 20))
War Charities (Scotland) Act 1919 (repealed)	9 & 10 Geo. 5. c. 12	16 April 1919
An Act to facilitate the administration of War Charities in Scotland. (Repealed by War Charities Act 1940 (3 & 4 Geo. 6. c. 31))
Local Elections (Expenses) Act 1919 (repealed)	9 & 10 Geo. 5. c. 13	16 April 1919
An Act to amend section five of the Municipal Elections (Corrupt and Illegal Practices) Act, 1884, (Note: Municipal Elections (Corrupt and Illegal Practices) Act 1884 (47 & 48 Vict. c. 70)) and section nine of the Elections (Scotland) (Corrupt and Illegal Practices) Act, 1890, (Note: Elections (Scotland) (Corrupt and Illegal Practices) Act 1890 (53 & 54 Vict. c. 55)) as to expenses of candidates at Local elections. (Repealed by Representation of the People Act 1949 (12, 13 & 14 Geo. 6. c. 68))
Criminal Injuries (Ireland) Act 1919 (repealed)	9 & 10 Geo. 5. c. 14	16 April 1919
An Act to amend the enactments relative to compensation for Criminal Injuries in Ireland. (Repealed by Criminal Injuries to Persons (Compensation) Act (Northern Ireland) 1968 (c. 11 (N.I.)) (Note: Incorrectly cited as "c 9" in the Chronological Table of the Statutes.))
Naval, Military and Air Force Service Act 1919 (repealed)	9 & 10 Geo. 5. c. 15	16 April 1919
An Act to make provision for the maintenance of such forces of the Crown as may be required to meet exigencies arising before the thirtieth day of April nineteen hundred and twenty, and with respect to the conditions of service of such forces, and for purposes connected therewith. (Repealed by Statute Law Revision Act 1927 (17 & 18 Geo. 5. c. 42))
Public Health (Medical Treatment of Children) (Ireland) Act 1919 (repealed)	9 & 10 Geo. 5. c. 16	29 May 1919
An Act to make provision for the medical treatment of children attending Elementary Schools in Ireland, and for other matters incidental thereto. (Repealed by Education Act (Northern Ireland) 1923 (13 & 14 Geo. 5. c. 21 (N.I.)))
Education (Scotland) (Superannuation) Act 1919 (repealed)	9 & 10 Geo. 5. c. 17	29 May 1919
An Act to make further provision for superannuation and other allowances to Teachers in Scotland, and gratuities to their personal representatives, and for other purposes in connection therewith. (Repealed by Statute Law Revision Act 1927 (17 & 18 Geo. 5. c. 42) and Education (Scotland) Act 1946 (9 & 10 Geo. 6. c. 72))
Wages (Temporary Regulation) Extension Act 1919 (repealed)	9 & 10 Geo. 5. c. 18	29 May 1919
An Act to extend the operation of the Wages (Temporary Regulation) Act, 1918, (Note: Wages (Temporary Regulation) Act 1918 (8 & 9 Geo. 5. c. 61)) for a further period of six months. (Repealed by Statute Law Revision Act 1927 (17 & 18 Geo. 5. c. 42))
Local Government (Ireland) Act 1919	9 & 10 Geo. 5. c. 19	3 June 1919
An Act to amend further the Law relating to Local Government in Ireland and for other purposes connected therewith. (Repealed for Northern Ireland by Local Government (Miscellaneous Provisions) (Northern Ireland) Order 1985 (SI 1985/1208 (N.I. 15)))
Scottish Board of Health Act 1919	9 & 10 Geo. 5. c. 20	3 June 1919
An Act to establish a Scottish Board of Health to exercise powers with respect to Health and Local Government in Scotland, and for purposes connected therewith.
Ministry of Health Act 1919 (repealed)	9 & 10 Geo. 5. c. 21	3 June 1919
An Act to establish a Ministry of Health to exercise in England and Wales powers with respect to Health and Local Government, and confer upon the Chief Secretary certain powers with respect to Health in Ireland, and for purposes connected therewith. (Repealed by National Health Service (Pre-consolidation Amendments) Order 2006 (SI 2006/1407))
Disabled Men (Facilities for Employment) Act 1919 (repealed)	9 & 10 Geo. 5. c. 22	22 July 1919
An Act to enable arrangements to be made as to employers' liability, to pay compensation in respect of men disabled by service in His Majesty's Forces during the present War with a view to facilitating their employment. (Repealed for England and Wales and Scotland by National Insurance (Industrial Injuries) Act 1946 (9 & 10 Geo. 6. c. 62) and for Northern Ireland by National Insurance (Industrial Injuries) Act (Northern Ireland) 1946 (c. 21 (N.I.)))
Anthrax Prevention Act 1919	9 & 10 Geo. 5. c. 23	22 July 1919
An Act to control the importation of goods infected or likely to be infected with Anthrax, and to provide for the disinfection of any such goods.
Law Agents Apprenticeship (War Service) (Scotland) Act 1919 (repealed)	9 & 10 Geo. 5. c. 24	22 July 1919
An Act to make further provision for the reckoning of service in connection with the present war as service under an indenture of apprenticeship for the purposes of the Law Agents (Scotland) Act, 1873. (Note: Law Agents (Scotland) Act 1873 (36 & 37 Vict. c. 63)) (Repealed by Statute Law Revision Act 1927 (17 & 18 Geo. 5. c. 42))
Public Notaries (Articled Clerks) Act 1919 (repealed)	9 & 10 Geo. 5. c. 25	22 July 1919
An Act to modify the requirements of the enactments relating to public notaries with respect to articled clerks who have served in His Majesty's Forces or in other public service or have been prisoners of war or interned in connection with the present war. (Repealed by Statute Law Revision Act 1927 (17 & 18 Geo. 5. c. 42))
Grant of Administration (Bonds) Act 1919 (repealed)	9 & 10 Geo. 5. c. 26	22 July 1919
An Act to amend the Law with respect to Bonds given by persons to whom administration is granted. (Repealed by Administration of Justice Act 1925 (15 & 16 Geo. 5. c. 28))
Solicitors (Articled Clerks) Act 1919 (repealed)	9 & 10 Geo. 5. c. 27	22 July 1919
An Act to extend the provisions of section one of the Solicitors (Articled Clerks) Act, 1918. (Note: Solicitors (Articled Clerks) Act 1918 (8 & 9 Geo. 5. c. 16)) (Repealed by Statute Law Revision Act 1927 (17 & 18 Geo. 5. c. 42))
Matrimonial Causes (Dominions Troops) Act 1919 (repealed)	9 & 10 Geo. 5. c. 28	22 July 1919
An Act to enable the competent courts in the United Kingdom to entertain matrimonial proceedings in respect of certain marriages contracted during the war by members of His Majesty's Forces domiciled outside the United Kingdom. (Repealed by Statute Law Revision Act 1927 (17 & 18 Geo. 5. c. 42))
Weights and Measures (Leather Measurement) Act 1919 or the Weights and Measures Act 1919 (repealed)	9 & 10 Geo. 5. c. 29	22 July 1919
An Act to amend the Weights and Measures Acts, 1878 to 1904, in relation to instruments for measuring leather by superficial area. (Repealed for England and Wales and Scotland by Weights and Measures (Amendment) Act 1926 (16 & 17 Geo. 5. c. 8) and for Northern Ireland by Weights and Measures (Amendment) Act (Northern Ireland) 1930 (20 & 21 Geo. 5. c. 16 (N.I.)))
Official Solicitor Act 1919 (repealed)	9 & 10 Geo. 5. c. 30	22 July 1919
An Act to enable the Official Solicitor for the time being to exercise powers and perform duties conferred or imposed on the person holding the office of Official Solicitor. (Repealed by Supreme Court of Judicature (Consolidation) Act 1925 (15 & 16 Geo. 5. c. 49))
Statement of Rates Act 1919	9 & 10 Geo. 5. c. 31	22 July 1919
An Act to provide for the information to occupiers of the amount of the rates payable for the houses which they occupy.
Finance Act 1919 (repealed)	9 & 10 Geo. 5. c. 32	31 July 1919
An Act to grant certain duties of Customs and Inland Revenue, including, Excise, to alter other duties, and to amend the Law relating to Customs and Inland Revenue, including Excise, and the National Debt, and to make further provisions in connection with Finance. (Repealed by Finance Act 1920 (10 & 11 Geo. 5. c. 18), Finance Act 1924 (14 & 15 Geo. 5. c. 21), Statute Law Revision Act 1927 (17 & 18 Geo. 5. c. 42), Statute Law Revision Act 1950 (14 Geo. 6. c. 6), Income Tax Act 1952 (15 & 16 Geo. 6 & 1 Eliz. 2. c. 10), Customs and Excise Act 1952 (15 & 16 Geo. 6 & 1 Eliz. 2. c. 44), Finance Act 1962 (c. 44), Statute Law Revision Act 1964 (c. 79), Finance Act 1975 (c. 7) and Finance Act 1978 (c. 42))
Treaty of Peace Act 1919 (repealed)	9 & 10 Geo. 5. c. 33	31 July 1919
An Act for carrying into effect the Treaty of Peace between His Majesty and certain other Powers. (Repealed by Statute Law (Repeals) Act 1976 (c. 16))
Anglo-French Treaty (Defence of France) Act 1919 (repealed)	9 & 10 Geo. 5. c. 34	31 July 1919
An Act for approving a Treaty between His Majesty and the President of the French Republic. (Repealed by Statute Law Revision Act 1927 (17 & 18 Geo. 5. c. 42))
Housing, Town Planning, &c. Act 1919 or the Addison Act (repealed)	9 & 10 Geo. 5. c. 35	31 July 1919
An Act to amend the enactments relating to the Housing of the Working Classes, Town Planning, and the acquisition of small dwellings. (Repealed by Housing (Consequential Provisions) Act 1985 (c. 71))
National Health Insurance Act 1919 (repealed)	9 & 10 Geo. 5. c. 36	15 August 1919
An Act to alter the rate of remuneration for the purposes of exception from insurance under the National Insurance (Health) Acts, 1911 to 1918, and for purposes in connection therewith. (Repealed by National Health Insurance Act 1924 (14 & 15 Geo. 5. c. 38))
War Loan Act 1919 (repealed)	9 & 10 Geo. 5. c. 37	15 August 1919
An Act to make further provision for raising Money for the present War, and for purposes in connexion therewith; to authorise the extension in certain cases of War Savings Certificates, and to make further provision in relation to Government Securities. (Repealed by Statute Law (Repeals) Act 1986 (c. 12))
Merchant Shipping (Wireless Telegraphy) Act 1919 (repealed)	9 & 10 Geo. 5. c. 38	15 August 1919
An Act to make further provision with respect to Wireless Telegraphy on Ships. (Repealed by Merchant Shipping (Safety Convention) Act 1949 (12, 13 & 14 Geo. 6. c. 43) and Statute Law (Repeals) Act 1989 (c. 43))
Expiring Laws Continuance Act 1919 (repealed)	9 & 10 Geo. 5. c. 39	15 August 1919
An Act to continue certain Expiring Laws. (Repealed by Statute Law Revision Act 1927 (17 & 18 Geo. 5. c. 42))
Retired Officers (Civil Employment) Act 1919 (repealed)	9 & 10 Geo. 5. c. 40	15 August 1919
An Act to enable the rules as to the Civil Employment of Retired Officers to be revoked or modified in so far as they provide for deductions from civil pay. (Repealed by Statute Law Revision Act 1964 (c. 79))
Education (Compliance with Conditions of Grants) Act 1919 (repealed)	9 & 10 Geo. 5. c. 41	15 August 1919
An Act to enable Governing Bodies of Schools and Educational Institutions to comply with the conditions prescribed in the Regulations of the Board of Education for the receipt of grants out of moneys provided by Parliament. (Repealed by Education Act 1921 (11 & 12 Geo. 5. c. 51))
Restoration of Pre-War Practices Act 1919 (repealed)	9 & 10 Geo. 5. c. 42	15 August 1919
An Act to make provision with respect to the restoration after the present war of certain trade practices, and to amend the law relating to munitions tribunals. (Repealed by Statute Law Revision Act 1927 (17 & 18 Geo. 5. c. 42))
Government of the Soudan Loan Act 1919 (repealed)	9 & 10 Geo. 5. c. 43	15 August 1919
An Act to authorise the Treasury to guarantee the Payment of Interest on a Loan to be raised by the Government of the Soudan. (Repealed by Statute Law Revision Act 1958 (6 & 7 Eliz. 2. c. 46))
Government War Obligations Act 1919 (repealed)	9 & 10 Geo. 5. c. 44	15 August 1919
An Act to make provision with respect to Obligations incurred by or on behalf of His Majesty's Government for the purpose on the present War or in connection therewith. (Repealed by Statute Law Revision Act 1958 (6 & 7 Eliz. 2. c. 46))
Housing (Ireland) Act 1919	9 & 10 Geo. 5. c. 45	15 August 1919
An Act to amend the enactments relating to the Housing of the Working Classes and the acquisition of Small Dwellings in Ireland.
Police Act 1919 (repealed)	9 & 10 Geo. 5. c. 46	15 August 1919
An Act to amend the Law relating to the Police in Great Britain. (Repealed by Police Act 1964 (c. 48))
West Indian Court of Appeal Act 1919 (repealed)	9 & 10 Geo. 5. c. 47	15 August 1919
An Act to provide for the establishment of a Court of Appeal for certain of His Majesty's Colonies in the West Indies. (Repealed by West Indies Act 1962 (10 & 11 Eliz. 2. c. 19))
Coal Mines Act 1919 (repealed)	9 & 10 Geo. 5. c. 48	15 August 1919
An Act to amend the Coal Mines Acts, 1887 to 1914, with respect to the Hours of Employment below Ground. (Repealed by Coal Industry Act 1992 (c. 17))
Consolidated Fund (No. 2) Act 1919 (repealed)	9 & 10 Geo. 5. c. 49	15 August 1919
An Act to apply certain sums out of the Consolidated Fund to the service of the years ending on the thirty-first day of March one thousand nine hundred and eighteen and one thousand nine hundred and twenty. (Repealed by Statute Law Revision Act 1927 (17 & 18 Geo. 5. c. 42))
Ministry of Transport Act 1919	9 & 10 Geo. 5. c. 50	15 August 1919
An Act to establish a Ministry of Transport and for purposes connected therewith. (Repealed for Northern Ireland by Roads (Northern Ireland) Order 1980 (SI 1980/1085 (N.I. 11)))
Checkweighing in Various Industries Act 1919 (repealed)	9 & 10 Geo. 5. c. 51	15 August 1919
An Act to provide for checking the Weight or Measurement of Materials produced, handled, or gotten by Workmen paid by weight or measure in certain Industries. (Repealed by Wages Act 1986 (c. 48))
Public Works Loans Act 1919 (repealed)	9 & 10 Geo. 5. c. 52	19 August 1919
An Act to grant Money for the purpose of certain Local Loans out of the Local Loans Fund, and for other purposes relating to Local Loans. (Repealed by Statute Law Revision Act 1927 (17 & 18 Geo. 5. c. 42))
War Pensions (Administrative Provisions) Act 1919	9 & 10 Geo. 5. c. 53	19 August 1919
An Act to make further provision for the administration of the enactments relating to Naval, Military and Air Force War Pensions, Grants and Allowances, and for certain other purposes connected with such Pensions, Grants and Allowances.
Animals (Anæsthetics) Act 1919 or the Animals (Anaesthetics) Act 1919 (repealed)	9 & 10 Geo. 5. c. 54	19 August 1919
An Act to make further provision for the Protection of Animals from Cruelty. (Repealed for England and Wales and Scotland by Protection of Animals (Anaesthetics) Act 1954 (2 & 3 Eliz. 2. c. 46) and for Northern Ireland by Protection of Animals Act (Northern Ireland) 1961 (c. 9 (N.I.)))
Labourers (Ireland) Act 1919 (repealed)	9 & 10 Geo. 5. c. 55	19 August 1919
An Act to amend the definition of Agricultural Labourer for the purposes of the Labourers (Ireland) Acts. (Repealed by Statute Law Revision Act (Northern Ireland) 1954 (c. 35 (N.I.)))
Solicitors Act 1919 (repealed)	9 & 10 Geo. 5. c. 56	19 August 1919
An Act to amend the Law relating to Solicitors. (Repealed by Solicitors Act 1932 (22 & 23 Geo. 5. c. 37))
Acquisition of Land (Assessment of Compensation) Act 1919 (repealed)	9 & 10 Geo. 5. c. 57	19 August 1919
An Act to amend the law as to the Assessment of Compensation in respect of Land acquired compulsorily for public purposes and the costs in proceedings thereon. (Repealed for England and Wales by Land Compensation Act 1961 (9 & 10 Eliz. 2. c. 33), for Scotland by Land Compensation (Scotland) Act 1963 (c. 51) and for Northern Ireland by Land Compensation (Northern Ireland) Order 1982 (SI 1982/712 (N.I. 9)) (Note: Incorrectly cited as "1982/766" in the Chronological Table of the Statutes.))
Forestry Act 1919 (repealed)	9 & 10 Geo. 5. c. 58	19 August 1919
An Act for establishing a Forestry Commission for the United Kingdom, and promoting afforestation and the production and supply of timber therein, and for purposes in connexion therewith. (Repealed for England and Wales and Scotland by Plant Health Act 1967 (c. 8) and Forestry Act 1967 (c. 10) and for Northern Ireland by Forestry Act (Northern Ireland) 1953 (c. 2 (N.I.)))
Land Settlement (Facilities) Act 1919	9 & 10 Geo. 5. c. 59	19 August 1919
An Act to make further provision for the acquisition of land for the purposes of small holdings, reclamation, and drainage, to amend the enactments relating to small holdings and allotments, and otherwise to facilitate land settlement.
Housing, Town Planning, etc. (Scotland) Act 1919 (repealed)	9 & 10 Geo. 5. c. 60	19 August 1919
An Act to amend the enactments relating to Housing, Town Planning, and the acquisition of Small Dwellings in Scotland. (Repealed by Statute Law (Repeals) Act 1981 (c. 19))
Intestate Moveable Succession (Scotland) Act 1919 (repealed)	9 & 10 Geo. 5. c. 61	19 August 1919
An Act to amend the Law of Intestate Moveable Succession in Scotland. (Repealed by Succession (Scotland) Act 1964 (c. 41))
British Mercantile Marine Uniform Act 1919 (repealed)	9 & 10 Geo. 5. c. 62	19 August 1919
An Act to make provision with respect to the British Mercantile Marine Uniform. (Repealed by Merchant Shipping Act 1995 (c. 21))
Agricultural Land Sales (Restriction of Notices to Quit) Act 1919 (repealed)	9 & 10 Geo. 5. c. 63	19 August 1919
An Act to amend the law as to Notices to Quit given to Tenants by Owners of Agricultural Land prior to the sale of such land. (Repealed by Agricultural Holdings Act 1923 (13 & 14 Geo. 5. c. 9) and Agricultural Holdings (Scotland) Act 1923 (13 & 14 Geo. 5. c. 10))
Courts (Emergency Powers) Act 1919 (repealed)	9 & 10 Geo. 5. c. 64	19 August 1919
An Act to extend, amend, and prolong the duration of section one of the Courts (Emergency Powers) Act, 1917. (Note: Courts (Emergency Powers) Act 1917 (7 & 8 Geo. 5. c. 25)) (Repealed by Statute Law Revision Act 1964 (c. 79))
Welsh Church (Temporalities) Act 1919	9 & 10 Geo. 5. c. 65	19 August 1919
An Act to continue in office the Welsh Commissioners appointed under the Welsh Church Act, 1914, (Note: Welsh Church Act 1914 (4 & 5 Geo. 5. c. 91)) to postpone the date of disestablishment, and to make further provision with respect to the temporalities of, and marriages in, the Church in Wales.
Profiteering Act 1919 (repealed)	9 & 10 Geo. 5. c. 66	19 August 1919
An Act to check Profiteering. (Repealed by Statute Law Revision Act 1927 (17 & 18 Geo. 5. c. 42))
Superannuation (Prison Officers) Act 1919 (repealed)	9 & 10 Geo. 5. c. 67	20 November 1919
An Act to amend the Superannuation Acts in their application to officers employed in Prisons and Criminal Lunatic Asylums. (Repealed by Superannuation Act (Northern Ireland) 1949 (c. 13 (N.I.)) and Superannuation Act 1949 (12, 13 & 14 Geo. 6. c. 44))
Constabulary and Police (Ireland) Act 1919 (repealed)	9 & 10 Geo. 5. c. 68	20 November 1919
An Act to amend the Law relating to the Royal Irish Constabulary and Dublin Metropolitan Police. (Repealed by Police (Northern Ireland) Act 1998 (c. 32))
Industrial Courts Act 1919 (repealed)	9 & 10 Geo. 5. c. 69	20 November 1919
An Act to provide for the establishment of an Industrial Court and Courts of Inquiry in connection with Trade Disputes, and to make other provision for the settlement of such disputes, and to continue for a limited period certain of the provisions of the Wages (Temporary Regulation) Act, 1918. (Repealed by Trade Union and Labour Relations (Consolidation) Act 1992 (c. 52))
County Court Judges (Retirement Pensions and Deputies) Act 1919 (repealed)	9 & 10 Geo. 5. c. 70	23 December 1919
An Act to make further provision with respect to the Retirement and Pensions of County Court Judges and the employment of deputy judges, and for purposes in connection therewith. (Repealed by County Courts Act 1934 (24 & 25 Geo. 5. c. 53))
Sex Disqualification (Removal) Act 1919 (repealed)	9 & 10 Geo. 5. c. 71	23 December 1919
An Act to amend the Law with respect to disqualifications on account of sex. (Repealed by Equality Act 2010 (c. 15))
Rats and Mice (Destruction) Act 1919	9 & 10 Geo. 5. c. 72	23 December 1919
An Act to make further provision for the Destruction of Rats and Mice. (Repealed for England and Wales and Scotland by Prevention of Damage by Pests Act 1949 (12, 13 & 14 Geo. 6. c. 55))
County Courts Act 1919 (repealed)	9 & 10 Geo. 5. c. 73	23 December 1919
An Act to amend the law relating to County Courts and to make further provision with respect to the powers of those Courts. (Repealed by County Courts Act 1934 (24 & 25 Geo. 5. c. 53))
Isle of Man (Customs) Act 1919	9 & 10 Geo. 5. c. 74	23 December 1919
An Act to amend the Law with respect to Customs in the Isle of Man.
Ferries (Acquisition by Local Authorities) Act 1919	9 & 10 Geo. 5. c. 75	23 December 1919
An Act to enable Local Authorities to acquire existing Ferries by Agreement.
Church of England Assembly (Powers) Act 1919 or the Enabling Act 1919	9 & 10 Geo. 5. c. 76	23 December 1919
An Act to confer powers on the National Assembly of the Church of England constituted in accordance with the constitution attached as an Appendix to the Addresses presented to His Majesty by the Convocations of Canterbury and York on the tenth day of May nineteen hundred and nineteen, and for other purposes connected therewith.
National Insurance (Unemployment) Act 1919 (repealed)	9 & 10 Geo. 5. c. 77	23 December 1919
An Act to increase the rate of unemployment benefit payable under the National Insurance (Unemployment) Acts, 1911 to 1918, and to make certain consequential amendments in those Acts. (Repealed by Unemployment Insurance Act 1920 (10 & 11 Geo. 5. c. 30))
Irish Railways (Confirmation of Agreement) Act 1919 (repealed)	9 & 10 Geo. 5. c. 78	23 December 1919
An Act to confirm certain terms in an Agreement between His Majesty's Government and the Irish Railway Companies. (Repealed by Statute Law Revision Act 1927 (17 & 18 Geo. 5. c. 42))
Trade Marks Act 1919 (repealed)	9 & 10 Geo. 5. c. 79	23 December 1919
An Act to amend the Trade Marks Act, 1905. (Note: Trade Marks Act 1905 (5 Edw. 7. c. 15)) (Repealed by Statute Law Revision Act 1927 (17 & 18 Geo. 5. c. 42), Trade Marks (Amendment) Act 1937 (1 Edw. 8 & 1 Geo. 6. c. 49) and Trade Marks Act 1938 (1 & 2 Geo. 6. c. 22))
Patents and Designs Act 1919 (repealed)	9 & 10 Geo. 5. c. 80	23 December 1919
An Act to amend the Patents and Designs Acts. (Repealed by Patents Act 1949 (12, 13 & 14 Geo. 6. c. 87) and Registered Designs Act 1949 (12, 13 & 14 Geo. 6. c. 88))
Dogs Regulation (Ireland) Act 1919 (repealed)	9 & 10 Geo. 5. c. 81	23 December 1919
Act to amend the Dogs Regulation (Ireland) Act, 1865. (Note: Dogs Regulation (Ireland) Act 1865 (28 & 29 Vict. c. 50)) (Repealed by Finance Act 1924 (No. 28 (RoI)) and the Dogs (Northern Ireland) Order 1983 (SI 1983/764 (N.I. 8)))
Irish Land (Provision for Sailors and Soldiers) Act 1919 (repealed)	9 & 10 Geo. 5. c. 82	23 December 1919
An Act to facilitate the provision of land in Ireland for men who have served in the Naval, Military, or Air Forces of the Crown in the present war, and for other purposes incidental thereto. (Repealed by Irish Sailors and Soldiers Land Trust Act 1987 (c. 48))
Workmen's Compensation (War Addition) Amendment Act 1919 (repealed)	9 & 10 Geo. 5. c. 83	23 December 1919
An Act to amend the Workmen's Compensation (War Addition) Act, 1917. (Note: Workmen's Compensation (War Addition) Act 1917 (7 & 8 Geo. 5. c. 42)) (Repealed for England and Wales and Scotland by Workmen's Compensation Act 1923 (13 & 14 Geo. 5. c. 42) and for Northern Ireland by Workmen's Compensation Act (Northern Ireland) 1923 (13 & 14 Geo. 5. c. 33 (N.I.)))
County and Borough Police Act 1919 (repealed)	9 & 10 Geo. 5. c. 84	23 December 1919
An Act to amend section four of the County and Borough Police Act, 1859. (Note: County and Borough Police Act 1859 (22 & 23 Vict. c. 32)) (Repealed by Police Act 1964 (c. 48))
Mental Deficiency and Lunacy (Amendment) Act 1919 (repealed)	9 & 10 Geo. 5. c. 85	23 December 1919
An Act to remove the limit imposed by section forty-seven of the Mental Deficiency Act, 1913, (Note: Mental Deficiency Act 1913 (3 & 4 Geo. 5. c. 28)) and by section thirty-seven of the Mental Deficiency and Lunacy (Scotland) Act, 1913, (Note: Mental Deficiency and Lunacy (Scotland) Act 1913 (3 & 4 Geo. 5. c. 38)) on the contributions which may be made by the Treasury under those sections, and to extend the powers of district boards of control in Scotland to borrow money. (Repealed by Statute Law Revision Act 1927 (17 & 18 Geo. 5. c. 42) and Local Government (Scotland) Act 1947 (10 & 11 Geo. 6. c. 43))
Anglo-Persian Oil Company (Acquisition of Capital) Amendment Act 1919 (repealed)	9 & 10 Geo. 5. c. 86	23 December 1919
An Act to amend the Anglo-Persian Oil Company (Acquisition of Capital) Act, 1914. (Note: Anglo-Persian Oil Company (Acquisition of Capital) Act 1914 (4 & 5 Geo. 5. c. 37)) (Repealed by Statute Law Revision Act 1927 (17 & 18 Geo. 5. c. 42))
Profiteering (Continuance) Act 1919 (repealed)	9 & 10 Geo. 5. c. 87	23 December 1919
An Act to extend the duration of the Profiteering Act, 1919. (Note: Profiteering Act 1919 (9 & 10 Geo. 5. c. 66)) (Repealed by Statute Law Revision Act 1927 (17 & 18 Geo. 5. c. 42))
Appropriation Act 1919 (repealed)	9 & 10 Geo. 5. c. 88	23 December 1919
An Act to apply a sum out of the Consolidated Fund to the service of the year ending on the thirty-first day of March one thousand nine hundred and twenty, and to appropriate the Supplies granted in this Session of Parliament. (Repealed by Statute Law Revision Act 1927 (17 & 18 Geo. 5. c. 42))
Regimental Debts (Deposit of Wills) (Scotland) Act 1919	9 & 10 Geo. 5. c. 89	23 December 1919
An Act to make provision with regard to wills deposited under section twenty-one of the Regimental Debts Act, 1893 (Note: Regimental Debts Act 1893 (56 & 57 Vict. c. 5)) with the Commissary Clerk of the County of Edinburgh, and required for the purpose of confirmation as executor or of completing a title to heritable estate in Scotland.
Increase of Rent, &c. (Amendment) Act 1919 (repealed)	9 & 10 Geo. 5. c. 90	23 December 1919
An Act to amend the Increase of Rent and Mortgage Interest (War Restrictions) Act, 1915, and the enactments amending that Act, in relation to orders for possession and ejectment. (Repealed by Increase of Rent and Mortgage Interest (Restrictions) Act 1920 (10 & 11 Geo. 5. c. 17))
Ministry of Agriculture and Fisheries Act 1919	9 & 10 Geo. 5. c. 91	23 December 1919
An Act to provide for the constitution of a Ministry of Agriculture and Fisheries and of Councils and Committees in connection with agriculture, and to amend the Board of Agriculture and Fisheries Acts, 1889 to 1909.
Aliens Restriction (Amendment) Act 1919	9 & 10 Geo. 5. c. 92	23 December 1919
An Act to continue and extend the provisions of the Aliens Restriction Act, 1914. (Note: Aliens Restriction Act 1914 (4 & 5 Geo. 5. c. 12))
Public Libraries Act 1919 (repealed)	9 & 10 Geo. 5. c. 93	23 December 1919
An Act to amend the Public Libraries Acts, 1892 to 1901, and to repeal so much of the Museums and Gymnasiums Act, 1891, (Note: Museums and Gymnasiums Act 1891 (54 & 55 Vict. c. 22)) as authorises the provision of Museums in England and Wales. (Repealed by Public Libraries and Museums Act 1964 (c. 75))
Nurses Registration Act 1919 (repealed)	9 & 10 Geo. 5. c. 94	23 December 1919
An Act to provide for the Registration of Nurses for the Sick. (Repealed by Nurses Act 1957 (5 & 6 Eliz. 2. c. 15))
Nurses Registration (Scotland) Act 1919 (repealed)	9 & 10 Geo. 5. c. 95	23 December 1919
An Act to provide for the Registration in Scotland of Nurses for the Sick. (Repealed by Nurses (Scotland) Act 1951 (14 & 15 Geo. 6. c. 55))
Nurses Registration (Ireland) Act 1919 (repealed)	9 & 10 Geo. 5. c. 96	23 December 1919
An Act to provide for the Registration of Nurses in Ireland. (Repealed by Joint Nursing and Midwives Council Act (Northern Ireland) 1922 (12 & 13 Geo. 5. c. 10 (N.I.)), Statute Law Revision Act 1927 (17 & 18 Geo. 5. c. 42), Nurses Act (Northern Ireland) 1946 (c. 15 (N.I.)) and Nurses and Midwives Act (Northern Ireland) 1959 (c. 19 (N.I.)))
Land Settlement (Scotland) Act 1919	9 & 10 Geo. 5. c. 97	23 December 1919
An Act to make further provision for the acquisition of land for the purposes of Small Holdings, Reclamation, and Drainage, and other purposes relating to Agriculture in Scotland, to amend the Small Landholders (Scotland) Act, 1911, (Note: Small Landholders (Scotland) Act 1911 (1 & 2 Geo. 5. c. 49)) and the enactments relating to Allotments, and otherwise to facilitate land settlement in Scotland.
Union of Benefices Act 1919 (repealed)	9 & 10 Geo. 5. c. 98	23 December 1919
An Act relating to the Union of Benefices. (Repealed by Union of Benefices Measure 1923 (14 & 15 Geo. 5. No. 2))
Housing (Additional Powers) Act 1919 (repealed)	9 & 10 Geo. 5. c. 99	23 December 1919
An Act to make further provision for the better housing of the people, to authorise the acquisition of land for the development of garden cities or for the purposes of town-planning schemes, and to make further provision with respect to the borrowing powers of public authorities and bodies and with respect to the securities issued by them. (Repealed for England and Wales and Scotland by Housing Act 1921 (11 & 12 Geo. 5. c. 19), Housing Act 1925 (15 & 16 Geo. 5. c. 14), Housing (Scotland) Act 1925 (15 & 16 Geo. 5. c. 15), Town Planning Act 1925 (15 & 16 Geo. 5. c. 16), Town Planning (Scotland) Act 1925 (15 & 16 Geo. 5. c. 17), Trustee Act 1925 (15 & 16 Geo. 5. c. 19), Statute Law Revision Act 1927 (17 & 18 Geo. 5. c. 42), Local Government Act 1933 (23 & 24 Geo. 5. c. 51), Local Government (Scotland) Act 1947 (10 & 11 Geo. 6. c. 43) and London Government Order 1966 (SI 1966/1305) and for Northern Ireland by Planning (Northern Ireland) Order 1972 (SI 1972/1634 (N.I. 17)))
Electricity (Supply) Act 1919 (repealed)	9 & 10 Geo. 5. c. 100	23 December 1919
An Act to amend the Law with respect to the supply of electricity. (Repealed by Electricity Act 1989 (c. 29))
Government of India Act 1919 (repealed)	9 & 10 Geo. 5. c. 101	23 December 1919
An Act to make further provision with resect to the Government of India. (Repealed by Government of India Act 1935 (26 Geo. 5 & 1 Edw. 8. c. 2) and Statute Law (Repeals) Act 1976 (c. 16))
Old Age Pensions Act 1919 (repealed)	9 & 10 Geo. 5. c. 102	23 December 1919
An Act to amend the Old Age Pensions Acts, 1908 (Note: Old Age Pensions Act 1908 (8 Edw. 7. c. 40)) and 1911, (Note: Old Age Pensions Act 1911 (1 & 2 Geo. 5. c. 16)) and the Debtors Act, 1869. (Note: Debtors Act 1869 (32 & 33 Vict. c. 62)) (Repealed for England and Wales and Scotland by Old Age Pensions Act 1936 (26 Geo. 5 & 1 Edw. 8. c. 31) and for Northern Ireland by Old Age Pensions Act (Northern Ireland) 1936 (26 Geo. 5 & 1 Edw. 8. c. 31 (N.I.)))

=== Local acts ===
Short title	Citation	Royal assent
Long title
Glasgow and South Western Railway (Ayr Harbour Transfer) Order Confirmation Act 1919	9 & 10 Geo. 5. c. i	28 March 1919
An Act to confirm a Provisional Order under the Private Legislation Procedure (Scotland) Act 1899 (Note: Private Legislation Procedure (Scotland) Act 1899 (62 & 63 Vict. c. 47)) relating to Glasgow and South Western Railway (Ayr Harbour Transfer).
	Glasgow and South Western Railway (Ayr Harbour Transfer) Order 1919 Provisional Order to transfer to and vest in the Glasgow and South Western Railway Company the undertaking of the Ayr Harbour Trustees to empower the Company to create and issue debenture stock and for other purposes.	
Leith Harbour and Docks Order Confirmation Act 1919 (repealed)	9 & 10 Geo. 5. c. ii	16 April 1919
An Act to confirm a Provisional Order under the Private Legislation Procedure (Scotland) Act 1899 relating to Leith Harbour and Docks. (Repealed by Statute Law (Repeals) Act 1986 (c. 12))
	Leith Harbour and Docks Order 1919 Provisional Order to authorise the Commissioners for the Harbour and Docks of Leith to construct new works and to borrow money to consolidate and increase the rates and charges and for other purposes.	
North British Railway Order Confirmation Act 1919	9 & 10 Geo. 5. c. iii	16 April 1919
An Act to confirm a Provisional Order under the Private Legislation Procedure (Scotland) Act 1899 relating to the North British Railway.
	North British Railway Order 1919 Provisional Order to empower the North British Railway Company to issue certain authorised capital as redeemable capital and for other purposes.	
Standard Life Assurance Company Order Confirmation Act 1919 (repealed)	9 & 10 Geo. 5. c. iv	16 April 1919
An Act to confirm a Provisional Order under the Private Legislation Procedure (Scotland) Act 1899 relating to the Standard Life Assurance Company. (Repealed by Standard Life Assurance Company's Act 1925 (15 & 16 Geo. 5. c. xlii))
	Standard Life Assurance Company's Order 1919 Provisional Order to confer further powers on the Standard Life Assurance Company.	
Brentford Gas Act 1919	9 & 10 Geo. 5. c. v	16 April 1919
An Act to confer further powers upon the Brentford Gas Company and for other purposes.
South Shields Gas Act 1919	9 & 10 Geo. 5. c. vi	29 May 1919
An Act to extend the limits for the supply of gas of the South Shields Gas Company to confer further powers upon that Company in connexion with their undertaking and for other purposes.
D. H. Evans and Company Act 1919	9 & 10 Geo. 5. c. vii	29 May 1919
An Act for enabling D. H. Evans & Co. Limited to re-arrange its capital and to provide for the cancellation of its founders' shares and to issue fully-paid ordinary shares in exchange therefor and for altering the memorandum and articles of association of that Company and to increase its capital and for enabling D. H. Evans & Co. Founders' Shares Company Limited to accept such ordinary shares of D. H. Evans & Co. Limited in exchange for the founders' shares of that Company and to pay to the directors of D. H. Evans & Co. Founders' Shares Company Limited compensation for loss of office as directors of that company and for other purposes.
St. George's Church Oxford Act 1919	9 & 10 Geo. 5. c. viii	29 May 1919
An Act to authorise the closing and disposal of the Church of St. George the Martyr in the City of Oxford and for other purposes.
Belfast Harbour Act 1919	9 & 10 Geo. 5. c. ix	29 May 1919
An Act to confer further powers upon the Belfast Harbour Commissioners with respect to the levying of tolls rates and charges and for other purposes.
Dover Harbour Act 1919 (repealed)	9 & 10 Geo. 5. c. x	29 May 1919
An Act to confer further powers upon the Dover Harbour Board with respect to the levying of tolls rates and charges and for other purposes. (Repealed by Dover Harbour Act 1949 (12, 13 & 14 Geo. 6. c. xxxiv))
Blyth Harbour Act 1919 (repealed)	9 & 10 Geo. 5. c. xi	29 May 1919
An Act to increase the maximum rates dues tolls and charges leviable by the Blyth Harbour Commissioners. (Repealed by Blyth Harbour Act 1986 (c. xxi))
Bristol Corporation Act 1919 (repealed)	9 & 10 Geo. 5. c. xii	29 May 1919
An Act to increase the maximum rates dues tolls and charges leviable by the Bristol Corporation in respect of their dock undertaking and for other purposes. (Repealed by Bristol Corporation Act 1961 (9 & 10 Eliz. 2. c. xliv))
Dublin Port and Docks Act 1919	9 & 10 Geo. 5. c. xiii	29 May 1919
An Act to increase the maximum rates dues tolls and charges leviable by the Dublin Port and Docks Board.
Mersey Docks and Harbour Board Act 1919	9 & 10 Geo. 5. c. xiv	29 May 1919
An Act to increase the rates dues rents tolls and charges authorised to be levied and to extend the period for the completion of works authorised to be made by the Mersey Docks and Harbour Board and for other purposes.
Newport Harbour Act 1919	9 & 10 Geo. 5. c. xv	29 May 1919
An Act to confer further powers on the Newport Harbour Commissioners with reference to wrecks and abandoned vessels.
Bankers Guarantee Trust (Transfer to Alliance Assurance) Act 1919	9 & 10 Geo. 5. c. xvi	29 May 1919
An Act to provide for the transfer of the business of the Bankers Guarantee Trust to the Alliance Assurance Company Limited and for other purposes.
Board of Education Scheme (Crossley and Porter Orphan Home and School) Confirmation Act 1919	9 & 10 Geo. 5. c. xvii	3 June 1919
An Act to confirm a Scheme approved and certified by the Board of Education under the Charitable Trusts Act 1853 (Note: Charitable Trusts Act 1853 (16 & 17 Vict. c. 137)) relating to the Crossley and Porter Orphan Home and School.
	Scheme approved and certified by the Board of Education under the Charitable Trusts Acts 1853 to 1894 in the matter of the Crossley and Porter Orphan Home and School Halifax.	
Swansea Harbour Act 1919	9 & 10 Geo. 5. c. xviii	3 June 1919
An Act to further postpone the times for the repayment of moneys borrowed by the Swansea Harbour Trustees and for other purposes.
Northampton Gas Act 1919	9 & 10 Geo. 5. c. xix	22 July 1919
An Act for conferring further powers upon the Northampton Gaslight Company.
Legal and General Assurance Society's Act 1919 (repealed)	9 & 10 Geo. 5. c. xx	22 July 1919
An Act to change the name and extend the objects of the Legal and General Life Assurance Society and for other purposes. (Repealed by Legal and General Assurance Society Limited Act 1922 (12 & 13 Geo. 5. c. xvii))
Hartlepool Corporation Act 1919	9 & 10 Geo. 5. c. xxi	22 July 1919
An Act to authorise the mayor aldermen and burgesses of the borough of Hartlepool to acquire the ferry across the harbour at Hartlepool and to maintain improve and work the same and for other purposes.
Mansfield Railway Act 1919	9 & 10 Geo. 5. c. xxii	22 July 1919
An Act to authorise the Mansfield Railway Company to construct a branch railway in the county of Nottingham in extension of their authorised undertaking to raise additional capital and for other purposes.
Reigate Corporation Act 1919 (repealed)	9 & 10 Geo. 5. c. xxiii	22 July 1919
An Act for changing the system of audit of accounts for the borough of Reigate and for other purposes. (Repealed by Surrey Act 1985 (c. iii))
Hartlepool Gas and Water Act 1919	9 & 10 Geo. 5. c. xxiv	22 July 1919
An Act to authorise the Hartlepool Gas and Water Company to construct waterworks to confer further powers upon that Company in connexion with their undertaking and for other purposes.
Beccles Waterworks Act 1919 (repealed)	9 & 10 Geo. 5. c. xxv	22 July 1919
An Act to sanction and confirm the construction by the Beccles Waterworks Company of existing works and for other purposes. (Repealed by Beccles Water Order 1950 (SI 1950/257))
Tees Conservancy Act 1919 (repealed)	9 & 10 Geo. 5. c. xxvi	22 July 1919
An Act to confer further powers on the Tees Conservancy Commissioners with respect to rates and dues. (Repealed by Tees and Hartlepools Port Authority Act 1966 (c. xxv))
Stourport Gas Act 1919	9 & 10 Geo. 5. c. xxvii	22 July 1919
An Act for incorporating and conferring powers on the Stourport Gas Company.
Sunderland Gas Act 1919	9 & 10 Geo. 5. c. xxviii	22 July 1919
An Act to confer further powers upon the Sunderland Gas Company to extend their limits of supply and for other purposes.
Wear Navigation and Sunderland Dock Act 1919 (repealed)	9 & 10 Geo. 5. c. xxix	22 July 1919
An Act to increase the maximum rates dues tolls and charges leviable by the River Wear Commissioners. (Repealed by Wear Navigation and Sunderland Dock (Consolidation and Amendment) Act 1922 (12 & 13 Geo. 5. c. lxxxiv))
Chepstow Water Act 1919	9 & 10 Geo. 5. c. xxx	22 July 1919
An Act to confer further powers on the Chepstow Water Company and for other purposes.
Bridge of Allan Water Order Confirmation Act 1919	9 & 10 Geo. 5. c. xxxi	22 July 1919
An Act to confirm a Provisional Order under the Private Legislation Procedure (Scotland) Act 1899 relating to Bridge of Allan Water.
	Bridge of Allan Water Order 1919 Provisional Order to transfer the undertaking of the Bridge of Allan Water Company to the Provost Magistrates and Councillors of the burgh of Bridge of Allan and for other purposes.	
Edinburgh and Leith Corporations Gas Order Confirmation Act 1919	9 & 10 Geo. 5. c. xxxii	22 July 1919
An Act to confirm a Provisional Order under the Private Legislation Procedure (Scotland) Act 1899 relating to Edinburgh and Leith Corporations Gas.
	Edinburgh and Leith Corporations Gas Order 1919 Provisional Order to extend the period for the completion of certain works in connexion with the new gasworks of the Edinburgh and Leith Corporations Gas Commissioners at Granton and for other purposes.	
London County Council (General Powers) Act 1919	9 & 10 Geo. 5. c. xxxiii	31 July 1919
An Act to confer powers on the London County Council and for other purposes.
Sheringham Gas and Water Act 1919	9 & 10 Geo. 5. c. xxxiv	31 July 1919
An Act to confer further powers on the Sheringham Gas and Water Company and for other purposes.
Fylde Water Board Act 1919 (repealed)	9 & 10 Geo. 5. c. xxxv	31 July 1919
An Act to empower the Fylde Water Board to extend the periods limited by the Fylde Water Board Acts 1910 (Note: Fylde Water Board Act 1910 (10 Edw. 7 & 1 Geo. 5. c. cxxii)) and 1912 (Note: Fylde Water Board Act 1912 (2 & 3 Geo. 5. c. xcvii)) for the purchase of certain lands and the construction of certain works to increase the charges for the supply of water and for other purposes. (Repealed by County of Lancashire Act 1984 (c. xxi))
Llanelly Rural District Water Act 1919	9 & 10 Geo. 5. c. xxxvi	31 July 1919
An Act to confer further powers on the Llanelly Rural District Council in regard to their water undertaking.
Falmouth Docks Act 1919 (repealed)	9 & 10 Geo. 5. c. xxxvii	31 July 1919
An Act to authorise the Falmouth Docks Company to make additional works and to raise further capital and for other purposes. (Repealed by Falmouth Docks Act 1921 (11 & 12 Geo. 5. c. xxiii))
Medway Conservancy Act 1919 (repealed)	9 & 10 Geo. 5. c. xxxviii	31 July 1919
An Act to extend the powers of the Conservators of the River Medway to make further provisions with reference to the tolls and charges to be taken by the Conservators to provide for the appointment of additional Conservators and for other purposes. (Repealed by Medway Conservancy Act 1939 (2 & 3 Geo. 6. c. lxxxiv))
Newark Gas Act 1919 (repealed)	9 & 10 Geo. 5. c. xxxix	15 August 1919
An Act to authorise the Newark Gas Company to raise additional capital to confer further powers upon the Company in connexion with their undertaking and for other purposes. (Repealed by Statute Law (Repeals) Act 1995 (c. 44))
Stockton-on-Tees Corporation Act 1919 (repealed)	9 & 10 Geo. 5. c. xl	15 August 1919
An Act to empower the Corporation of Stockton-on-Tees to work tramways to purchase and provide and run omnibuses to establish and work ferries across the River Tees and for other purposes. (Repealed by Teesside Corporation Act 1971 (c.xvii))
Stocksbridge Gas Act 1919	9 & 10 Geo. 5. c. xli	15 August 1919
An Act to incorporate and confer powers on the Stocksbridge Gas Company and for other purposes.
Waterford Harbour Act 1919	9 & 10 Geo. 5. c. xlii	15 August 1919
An Act to authorise the Commissioners of the Port and Harbour of Waterford to levy rates on goods to provide for the appointment of the chairman and vice-chairman of the Commissioners to confer further powers on the Commissioners and to amend their existing Acts and for other purposes.
Nuneaton Corporation Act 1919 (repealed)	9 & 10 Geo. 5. c. xliii	15 August 1919
An Act to constitute the Corporation of Nuneaton the burial board for the borough to increase the number of the council to make better provision for the health local government and improvement of the borough to confer further powers upon the Corporation with respect to the supply of water and electricity and for other purposes. (Repealed by Statute Law (Repeals) Act 1995 (c. 44))
Poole Corporation Act 1919	9 & 10 Geo. 5. c. xliv	15 August 1919
An Act to authorise the mayor aldermen and burgesses of the borough of Poole to acquire the undertaking of the Poole Bridge Company and to make provision with regard to lands in the borough adjacent to the foreshore with regard to the health local government and improvement of the borough the establishment of a fund for the granting of superannuation allowances to officers and servants and for other purposes.
London County Council (Money) Act 1919 (repealed)	9 & 10 Geo. 5. c. xlv	15 August 1919
An Act to regulate the expenditure on capital account and lending of money by the London County Council during the financial period from the first day of April one thousand nine hundred and nineteen to the thirtieth day of September one thousand nine hundred and twenty and for other purposes. (Repealed by London County Council (Loans) Act 1955 (4 & 5 Eliz. 2. c. xxvi))
Manchester Ship Canal Act 1919	9 & 10 Geo. 5. c. xlvi	15 August 1919
An Act to increase the maximum rates dues tolls and charges leviable by the Manchester Ship Canal Company.
Rotherham Corporation Act 1919 (repealed)	9 & 10 Geo. 5. c. xlvii	15 August 1919
An Act to make further provision in regard to certain loans raised by the mayor aldermen and burgesses of the county borough of Rotherham for the purposes of their electricity undertaking and in regard to the purchase of certain lands by them and for other purposes. (Repealed by Statute Law (Repeals) Act 1989 (c. 43))
Bournemouth Gas and Water Act 1919	9 & 10 Geo. 5. c. xlviii	15 August 1919
An Act to confer further powers upon the Bournemouth Gas and Water Company.
Sheffield Corporation Act 1919 (repealed)	9 & 10 Geo. 5. c. xlix	15 August 1919
An Act to confer upon the Corporation of the City of Sheffield further powers for the construction of waterworks street improvements and tramways and for other purposes. (Repealed by Statute Law (Repeals) Act 1989 (c. 43))
Birmingham Corporation Tramways Act 1919 (repealed)	9 & 10 Geo. 5. c. l	15 August 1919
An Act to confer further powers upon the lord mayor aldermen and citizens of the city of Birmingham in regard to their tramway undertaking and for the construction of street improvements and for other purposes. (Repealed by West Midlands County Council Act 1980 (c. xi))
Blackpool Improvement Act 1919	9 & 10 Geo. 5. c. li	15 August 1919
An Act to provide for the transfer to the mayor aldermen and burgesses of the borough of Blackpool of the undertaking of the Blackpool and Fleetwood Tramroad Company and to empower the said mayor aldermen and burgesses to construct additional tramways and a street improvement and for other purposes.
East Ham Corporation Act 1919 (repealed)	9 & 10 Geo. 5. c. lii	15 August 1919
An Act to alter the wards of the borough of East Ham to increase the number of aldermen and councillors of the borough to increase the number of guardians representing the parish of East Ham on the West Ham Poor Law Union and for other purposes. (Repealed by Local Law (London Borough of Newham) Order 1965 (SI 1965/509))
Leeds Corporation Act 1919 (repealed)	9 & 10 Geo. 5. c. liii	15 August 1919
An Act to empower the lord mayor aldermen and citizens of the city of Leeds to acquire lands for providing further housing accommodation and to construct tramways street improvements and waterworks to extend the boundary of the city and for other purposes. (Repealed by West Yorkshire Act 1980 (c.xiv))
London Electric Railway Act 1919	9 & 10 Geo. 5. c. liv	15 August 1919
An Act to empower the London Electric Railway Company to construct a new subway and for other purposes.
Shoreham-by-Sea Urban District Council Act 1919	9 & 10 Geo. 5. c. lv	15 August 1919
An Act to empower the urban district council of Shoreham-by-Sea to construct a footbridge over the River Adur and for other purposes.
Tynemouth Corporation Act 1919	9 & 10 Geo. 5. c. lvi	15 August 1919
An Act to empower the mayor aldermen and burgesses of the borough of Tynemouth to construct a new street and street improvements to provide and run trolley vehicles and omnibuses to make further provision with respect to the acquisition by them of tramways and light railways and to enable them to work the same to make further provision with respect to their water undertaking and for other purposes.
West Hartlepool Corporation Act 1919	9 & 10 Geo. 5. c. lvii	15 August 1919
An Act to empower the mayor aldermen and burgesses of the borough of West Hartlepool to construct a tramroad a tramway and a street work and to provide and work omnibuses within and beyond the borough and for other purposes.
Middlesbrough Corporation Act 1919	9 & 10 Geo. 5. c. lviii	15 August 1919
An Act to confer powers upon the mayor aldermen and burgesses of the borough of Middlesbrough with respect to tramways and omnibuses to authorise them to construct street works to incorporate the Teesside Railless Traction Board and for other purposes.
Workington Corporation Act 1919	9 & 10 Geo. 5. c. lix	15 August 1919
An Act to confer powers upon the mayor aldermen and burgesses of the borough of Workington with regard to the supply of electricity and for other purposes.
Tyne Improvement Act 1919	9 & 10 Geo. 5. c. lx	15 August 1919
An Act for increasing the dues rates tolls and charges leviable by the Tyne Improvement Commissioners and extending the time for completion of works.
Huddersfield Corporation Gas Act 1919	9 & 10 Geo. 5. c. lxi	15 August 1919
An Act to make provision for the transfer of the under- takings of the Longwood and Slaithwaite and the Kirkheaton Dalton and Lepton Gas Companies to the mayor aldermen and burgesses of the borough of Huddersfield to make further provision in regard to the gas undertaking of the said mayor aldermen and burgesses and for other purposes.
Dover Gas Act 1919	9 & 10 Geo. 5. c. lxii	15 August 1919
An Act for conferring further capital and other powers on the Dover Gas Company.
Pembroke District Gas Act 1919	9 & 10 Geo. 5. c. lxiii	15 August 1919
An Act for incorporating and conferring powers on the Pembroke District Gas Company.
Bedwellty Urban District Council Act 1919	9 & 10 Geo. 5. c. lxiv	15 August 1919
An Act to confer further powers on the urban district council of Bedwellty with regard to the supply of electricity and gas and for other purposes.
Birmingham Corporation Act 1919 (repealed)	9 & 10 Geo. 5. c. lxv	15 August 1919
An Act to enlarge the powers of the lord mayor aldermen and citizens of the city of Birmingham in relation to the provision of housing accommodation and the acquisition of lands to authorise them to establish a savings and housing bank and for other purposes. (Repealed by West Midlands County Council Act 1980 (c. xi))
Milford Docks Act 1919	9 & 10 Geo. 5. c. lxvi	15 August 1919
An Act to amend the powers of the Milford Docks Company of levying rates to revive the powers for the construction of a pier and for other purposes.
Stretford Urban District Council Act 1919	9 & 10 Geo. 5. c. lxvii	15 August 1919
An Act to enable the Stretford Urban District Council to purchase the undertaking of the Trafford Power and Light Supply (1902) Limited and to confer further powers on the Council in regard to their electricity undertaking to authorise the Council to provide and run omnibuses and to make further provision for the improvement health good government and finance of the district and for other purposes.
Londonderry Port and Harbour Act 1919	9 & 10 Geo. 5. c. lxviii	15 August 1919
An Act to confer further powers upon the Londonderry Port and Harbour Commissioners and for other purposes.
Newcastle-upon-Tyne Corporation (Rates) Act 1919 (repealed)	9 & 10 Geo. 5. c. lxix	15 August 1919
An Act to consolidate the local rates leviable in the city and county of Newcastle-upon-Tyne and to make provision with respect thereto and for other purposes. (Repealed by Newcastle-upon-Tyne Corporation (General Powers) Act 1935 (25 & 26 Geo. 5. c. cxxiv))
Commons Regulation (Coity Wallia) Provisional Order Confirmation Act 1919 (repealed)	9 & 10 Geo. 5. c. lxx	15 August 1919
An Act to confirm a Provisional Order under the Inclosure Acts 1845 to 1899 to Coity Wallis Commons in the county of Glamorgan and for purposes incidental thereto. (Repealed by Coity Wallia Commons Act 1976 (c. xxix))
	Provisional Order for the Regulation of Coity Wallia Commons.	
Pier and Harbour Orders Confirmation Act 1919 (repealed)	9 & 10 Geo. 5. c. lxxi	15 August 1919
An Act to confirm certain Provisional Orders made by the Board of Trade under the General Pier and Harbour Act 1861 (Note: General Pier and Harbour Act 1861 (24 & 25 Vict. c. 45)) relating to Cowes and Findochty. (Repealed by Statute Law (Repeals) Act 1998 (c. 43))
	Cowes Harbour Order 1919 Order to revive the powers for the construction and to extend the time for the completion of the works authorised by the Cowes Harbour Order 1914 and for other purposes.	
	Findochty Harbour Order 1919 Provisional Order for the transfer to the Provost Magistrates and Councillors of the burgh of Findochty in the county of Banff of the undertaking of the Findochty Harbour Commissioners known as the Findochty Harbour and of the powers of the Commissioners with reference to the holding maintenance and management of the said harbour and the construction maintenance and regulation of piers and works in connexion therewith and for other purposes.	
Electric Lighting Order Confirmation Act 1919	9 & 10 Geo. 5. c. lxxii	15 August 1919
An Act to confirm a Provisional Order made by the Board of Trade under the Electric Lighting Acts 1882 to 1909 relating to Chepstow (Extension).
	Chepstow Electric Lighting (Extension) Order 1919	
City of London Police Act 1919 (repealed)	9 & 10 Geo. 5. c. lxxiii	15 August 1919
An Act to amend the enactments relating to the expenses of the Police Force of the City of London. (Repealed by Statute Law (Repeals) Act 1989 (c. 43))
Gas and Water Orders Confirmation Act 1919	9 & 10 Geo. 5. c. lxxiv	15 August 1919
An Act to confirm certain Provisional Orders made by the Board of Trade under the Gas and Water Works Facilities Act 1870 (Note: Gas and Water Works Facilities Act 1870 (33 & 34 Vict. c. 70)) relating to Elstree and Boreham Wood Gas and Tonbridge Water.
	Elstree and Boreham Wood Gas Order 1919 Order empowering the Elstree and Boreham Wood Gas Company Limited to raise additional capital and to continue construct and maintain existing and additional gasworks and for other purposes.	
	Tonbridge Water Order 1919 Order empowering the Tonbridge Waterworks Company Limited to maintain alter and extend certain existing waterworks to raise additional capital and for other purposes.	
Local Government Board's Provisional Orders Confirmation (No. 1) Act 1919	9 & 10 Geo. 5. c. lxxv	15 August 1919
An Act to confirm certain Provisional Orders of the Local Government Board relating to Birkenhead Blackburn Godalming Hyde and the District of the Heywood and Middleton Water Board.
	Birkenhead Order 1919	
	Blackburn Order 1919 Provisional Order for altering certain Local Acts and Confirming Acts.	
	Godalming Order 1919 Provisional Order for altering the Godalming Corporation Water Act 1899. (Note: Godalming Corporation Water Act 1899 (62 & 63 Vict. c. ccix))	
	Hyde Order 1919 Provisional Order for altering the Hyde Corporation Act 1903. (Note: Hyde Corporation Act 1903 (3 Edw. 7. c. cxxiii))	
	Heywood and Middleton Water Order 1919 Provisional Order for altering the Heywood and Middleton Water Board Acts 1898 to 1907.	
Local Government Board's Provisional Orders Confirmation (No. 2) Act 1919	9 & 10 Geo. 5. c. lxxvi	15 August 1919
An Act to confirm certain Provisional Orders of the Local Government Board relating to Ashborne Beckenham Liverpool Lytham Manchester Padiham and Rhyl.
	Ashbourne Order 1919	
	Beckenham Order 1919 Provisional Order for partially repealing and altering the Beckenham Urban District Council Act 1903. (Note: Beckenham Urban District Council Act 1903 (3 Edw. 7. c. ccxvii))	
	Liverpool Order 1919 Provisional Order for altering the Liverpool Corporation Act 1900 (Note: Liverpool Corporation Act 1900 (63 & 64 Vict. c. ccxxxvii)) and the Liverpool Corporation (General Powers) Act 1905. (Note: Liverpool Corporation (General Powers) Act 1905 (5 Edw. 7. c. clxxvii))	
	Lytham Order 1919 Provisional Order for altering the Lytham Improvement Act 1904 (Note: Lytham Improvement Act 1904 (4 Edw. 7. c. clv)) and certain Confirming Acts.	
	Manchester Order 1919 Provisional Order for altering the Manchester Corporation Act 1891. (Note: Manchester Corporation Act 1891 (54 & 55 Vict. c. ccvii))	
	Padiham Order 1919 Provisional Order for altering the Padiham Urban District Council Act 1908. (Note: Padiham Urban District Council Act 1908 (8 Edw. 7. c. civ))	
	Rhyl Order 1919 Provisional Order for partially repealing and altering the Rhyl Improvement Act 1852 (Note: Rhyl Improvement Act 1852 (15 & 16 Vict. c. xxxii)) and the Rhyl Gas Act 1891. (Note: Rhyl Gas Act 1891 (54 & 55 Vict. c. cii))	
Local Government Board's Provisional Orders Confirmation (No. 3) Act 1919	9 & 10 Geo. 5. c. lxxvii	15 August 1919
An Act to confirm certain Provisional Orders of the Local Government Board relating to Bacup Burnley Finchley Scarborough Swindon and the Hitchin Rural and Letchworth Urban Joint Hospital District.
	Bacup Order 1919 Provisional Order for partially repealing and altering certain Local Acts.	
	Burnley Order 1919 Provisional Order for altering certain Local Acts.	
	Finchley Order 1919 Provisional Order for partially repealing and altering the Finchley Urban District Council Act 1908. (Note: Finchley Urban District Council Act 1908 (8 Edw. 7. c. lxxvi))	
	Scarborough Order 1919 Provisional Order for partially repealing and altering the Scarborough Improvement Act 1889. (Note: Scarborough Improvement Act 1889 (52 & 53 Vict. c. clxiv))	
	Swindon Order 1919 Provisional Order for altering the Swindon Water Act 1894 (Note: Swindon Water Act 1894 (57 & 58 Vict. c. clxxxi)) the Swindon Corporation Act 1904 (Note: Swindon Corporation Act 1904 (4 Edw. 7. c. ccxxxiv)) the Swindon Corporation (Wilts and Berks Canal Abandonment) Act 1914 (Note: Swindon Corporation (Wilts and Berks Canal Abandonment) Act 1914 (4 & 5 Geo. 5. c. cviii)) and a Confirming Act. (Note: Local Government Board's Provisional Orders Confirmation (No. 11) Act 1902 (2 Edw. 7. c. lxxxiv))	
	Hichin Rural and Letchworth Urban Joint Hospital Order 1919 Provisional Order for forming a United District under Section 279 of the Public Health Act 1875. (Note: Public Health Act 1875 (38 & 39 Vict. c. 55))	
Local Government Board's Provisional Order Confirmation (No. 4) Act 1919	9 & 10 Geo. 5. c. lxxviii	15 August 1919
An Act to confirm a Provisional Order of the Local Government Board relating to the Counties of Chester and Lancaster.
	Counties of Chester and Lancaster (Alteration of County Boundaries) Order 1919 Provisional Order made in pursuance of the Local Government Act 1888 (Note: Local Government Act 1888 (51 & 52 Vict. c. 41)) for altering the Boundary between Counties.	
Local Government Board's Provisional Order Confirmation (No. 5) Act 1919	9 & 10 Geo. 5. c. lxxix	15 August 1919
An Act to confirm a Provisional Order of the Local Government Board relating to Lowestoft.
	Lowestoft (Extension) Order 1919 Provisional Order made in pursuance of the Local Government Act 1888 for extending a Borough.	
Local Government Board's Provisional Order Confirmation (No. 6) Act 1919	9 & 10 Geo. 5. c. lxxx	15 August 1919
An Act to confirm a Provisional Order of the Local Government Board relating to the District of the Southport Birkdale and West Lancashire Water Board.
	Southport, Birkdale and West Lancashire Water Board Order 1919 Provisional Order made in pursuance of the Southport (Extension) Order 1911 and the Local Government Act 1888.	
Local Government Board's Provisional Orders Confirmation (No. 7) Act 1919	9 & 10 Geo. 5. c. lxxxi	15 August 1919
An Act to confirm certain Provisional Orders of the Local Government Board relating to Morley and the Middlesex Districts Joint Small-pox Hospital District.
	Morley Order 1919 Provisional Order for altering the Morley Corporation Act 1913. (Note: Morley Corporation Act 1913 (3 & 4 Geo. 5. c. cxii))	
	Middlesex Districts Joint Smallpox Hospital Order 1919 Provisional Order for altering certain Confirming Acts.	
Local Government Board (Ireland) Provisional Orders Confirmation Act 1919	9 & 10 Geo. 5. c. lxxxii	15 August 1919
An Act to confirm certain Provisional Orders of the Local Government Board for Ireland relating to the County Borough of Cork and the Urban District of Dungarvan.
	Cork County Borough Order 1919 Provisional Order to alter and amend the Cork Improvement Act 1852 (Note: Cork Improvement Act 1852 (15 & 16 Vict. c. cxliii)) and the Cork Bridges Waterworks and Improvement Act 1856. (Note: Cork Bridges Waterworks and Improvement Act 1856 (19 & 20 Vict. c. xlviii))	
	Dungarvan (Financial Relations) Order 1919 Provisional Order to alter the Financial Relations between the Urban District of Dungarvan and the County of Waterford.	
Wells Particular Baptist and Congregational Chapels Charities Scheme Confirmation Act 1919	9 & 10 Geo. 5. c. lxxxiii	15 August 1919
An Act to confirm a Scheme of the Charity Commissioners for the application or management of certain Charities.
	Scheme for the application or management of the following Charities:—: 1. The Charity called the Union Street Particular Baptist Chapel in the City of Wells comprised in a scheme of the Charity Commissioners of the 11th January 1907 and of the following Charities connected therewith:— The Charity consisting of the residence for a minister in Wookey Hole Road in the said City comprised in an indenture dated 30th November 1915; The Charity consisting of the Baptist Chapel and Trust Property at Hill End West Horrington in the said City comprised in an indenture dated 28th October 1876; The Charity consisting of the Baptist Chapel or Mission Hall and Trust Property in the parish of Wookey in the County of Somerset comprised in the following indentures or one of them— Indenture dated 30th August 1879; Indenture dated 4th August 1883; and 2. The Charity consisting of the Congregational Chapel Schoolrooms Vestries and Buildings in the said City comprised in a scheme of the Charity Commissioners of the 18th January 1916 made in the matter of the Charity called Hackney College and administered and managed under that scheme by the Governors of the Hackney College Foundation registered.	
National Trust Charity Scheme Confirmation Act 1919	9 & 10 Geo. 5. c. lxxxiv	15 August 1919
An Act to confirm a Scheme of the Charity Commissioners for the application or management of the Charity called the National Trust for Places of Historic Interest or Natural Beauty incorporated by the National Trust Act 1907 (Note: National Trust Act 1907 (7 Edw. 7. c. cxxxvi)) (7 Edw. VII. cap. cxxxvi. Local and Private).
	Scheme for the application or management of the Charity called the National Trust for Places of Historic Interest or Natural Beauty incorporated by the National Trust Act 1907 (7 Ed. VII. cap. cxxxvi. Local and Private).	
Broke Robinson Museum Charity Scheme Confirmation Act 1919	9 & 10 Geo. 5. c. lxxxv	15 August 1919
An Act to confirm a Scheme of the Charity Commissioners for the application or management of the Charity called or known as the Brooke Robinson Museum in the Borough of Dudley in the County of Worcester.
	Scheme for the application or management of the Charity called or known as the Brooke Robinson Museum in the Borough of Dudley in the County of Worcester founded by Will and Codicil of Brooke Robinson proved in the Principal Registry on the 9th January 1912 and comprised in an Agreement of the 22nd February 1915 sanctioned by an Order of the Chancery Division of the High Court of Justice dated the 13th August 1915.	
Congregational Chapels Scheme Confirmation Act 1919	9 & 10 Geo. 5. c. lxxxvi	15 August 1919
An Act to confirm a Scheme of the Charity Commissioners for the application or management of certain charities.
	Scheme for the application or management of the following charities:—: 1. The Charity consisting of the Congregational Chapel and Minister's House in the Parish of Great Chesterford in the County of Essex comprised in the following Instruments:— Indenture dated 28th January 1846; Deed of Bargain and Sale dated 25th May 1861; Deed of Enfranchisement dated 1st December 1916: 2. The Charity consisting of the Congregational Chapel and Trust Property in Greenwich Road in the Metropolitan Borough and Parish of Greenwich in the County of London comprised in the following Instruments or some or one of them:— Indentures of Lease and Release dated respectively 19th and 20th February 1800; Declaration of Trusts dated 20th February 1800; Indenture dated 13th February 1816; Indenture dated 31st December 1824; Declaration of Trusts dated 31st December 1824.	
Eatington Wesleyan Methodist Chapel Property Charity Scheme Confirmation Act 1919	9 & 10 Geo. 5. c. lxxxvii	15 August 1919
An Act to confirm a Scheme of the Charity Commissioners for the application or management of the Charity consisting of certain property in the Parish of Eatington in the County of Warwick used as a schoolroom in connexion with the Wesleyan Methodist Chapel in the said Parish.
	Scheme for the application or management of the Charity consisting of certain property in the Parish of Eatington in the County of Warwick comprised in an Indenture dated 20th January 1886 and now used as a schoolroom in connexion with the Wesleyan Methodist Chapel in the said Parish.	
Plumptre Hospital Charity Scheme Confirmation Act 1919	9 & 10 Geo. 5. c. lxxxviii	15 August 1919
An Act to confirm a Scheme of the Charity Commissioners for the application or management of the Charity called or known as Plumptre Hospital in the City of Nottingham.
	Scheme for the application or management of the Charity called or known as Plumptre Hospital in the City of Nottingham founded by Instrument of the 12th July 1400 made under the authority of Letters Patent dated 8th July 1392.	
Headcorn Baptist Chapel Charity Scheme Confirmation Act 1919	9 & 10 Geo. 5. c. lxxxix	15 August 1919
An Act to confirm a Scheme of the Charity Commissioners for the application or management of the Charity consisting of the Baptist chapel and trust property in the parish of Headcorn in the county of Kent.
	Scheme for the application or management of the charity consisting of the Baptist chapel and trust property in the parish of Headcorn in the county of Kent comprised in indentures dated respectively the 10th March 1748 and the 5th September 1818 or one of them and of an endowment fund held in connexion with the said chapel.	
Tramways Orders Confirmation Act 1919	9 & 10 Geo. 5. c. xc	15 August 1919
An Act to confirm certain Provisional Orders made by the Board of Trade under the Tramways Act 1870 (Note: Tramways Act 1870 (33 & 34 Vict. c. 78)) relating to Oldham and Chadderton Tramways and Thornaby-on-Tees Corporation Tramway.
	Oldham and Chadderton Tramways Order 1919 Order authorising the Mayor Aldermen and Burgesses of the County Borough of Oldham and the Urban District Council of Chadderton in the County Palatine of Lancaster to construct Tramways in the borough and Urban District.	
	Thornaby-on-Tees Corporation Tramway Order 1919 Order authorising the Mayor Aldermen and Burgesses of the Borough of Thornaby-on-Tees to construct a Tramway in their Borough.	
Dundee Harbour and Tay Ferries Order Confirmation Act 1919 (repealed)	9 & 10 Geo. 5. c. xci	15 August 1919
An Act to confirm a Provisional Order under the Private Legislation Procedure (Scotland) Act 1899 relating to Dundee Harbour and Tay Ferries. (Repealed by Dundee Harbour and Tay Ferries Order Confirmation Act 1952 (15 & 16 Geo. 6 & 1 Eliz. 2. c. xx))
	Dundee Harbour and Tay Ferries Order 1919	
Greenock Port and Harbours Order Confirmation Act 1919	9 & 10 Geo. 5. c. xcii	15 August 1919
An Act to confirm a Provisional Order under the Private Legislation Procedure (Scotland) Act 1899 relating to Dundee Harbour and Tay Ferries.
	Greenock Port and Harbours Order 1919 Provisional Order to enable the Trustees of the Port and Harbours of Greenock to increase the authorised Tolls Dues Rates Duties and Charges leviable at the Port and Harbours of Greenock; and for other purposes.	
Ardrossan Harbour Order Confirmation Act 1919	9 & 10 Geo. 5. c. xciii	19 August 1919
An Act to confirm a Provisional Order under the Private Legislation Procedure (Scotland) Act 1899 relating to Ardrossan Harbour.
	Ardrossan Harbour Order 1919 Provisional Order to authorise the Ardrossan Harbour Company to levy increased tolls rates dues and charges at the Harbour of Ardrossan and for other purposes.	
Fraserburgh Harbour (Rates) Order Confirmation Act 1919 (repealed)	9 & 10 Geo. 5. c. xciv	19 August 1919
An Act to confirm a Provisional Order under the Private Legislation Procedure (Scotland) Act 1899 relating to Fraserburgh Harbour. (Repealed by Fraserburgh Harbour Order Confirmation Act 1985 (c. xlv))
	Fraserburgh Harbour (Rates) Order 1919 Provisional Order to authorise the Fraserburgh Harbour Commissioners to levy increased Rates and Charges; and for other purposes.	
Peterhead Harbours Order Confirmation Act 1919 (repealed)	9 & 10 Geo. 5. c. xcv	19 August 1919
An Act to confirm a Provisional Order under the Private Legislation Procedure (Scotland) Act 1899 relating to Peterhead Harbours. (Repealed by Peterhead Harbours Order Confirmation Act 1992 (c. xii))
	Peterhead Harbours Order 1919	
Glasgow Corporation Order Confirmation Act 1919	9 & 10 Geo. 5. c. xcvi	19 August 1919
An Act to confirm a Provisional Order under the Private Legislation Procedure (Scotland) Act 1899 relating to Glasgow Corporation.
	Glasgow Corporation Order 1919 Provisional Order to increase the Police and Sewage Assessments in the City of Glasgow; to amend certain rating provisions of the Glasgow Police Act, 1866; (Note: Glasgow Police Act 1866 (29 & 30 Vict. c. cclxxiii)) to amend the provisions of the Glasgow Improvements Acts relating to Sinking Fund and assessments; to increase the amount to be borrowed on Bills and Promissory Notes; to construct a new Tramway and Street Works; and for other purposes	
Clyde Valley Electrical Power Order Confirmation Act 1919 (repealed)	9 & 10 Geo. 5. c. xcvii	19 August 1919
An Act to confirm a Provisional Order under the Private Legislation Procedure (Scotland) Act 1899 relating to Clyde Valley Electrical Power. (Repealed by South of Scotland Electricity Order Confirmation Act 1956 (4 & 5 Eliz. 2. c. xciv))
	Clyde Valley Electrical Power Order 1919 Provisional Order to confirm certain Agreements between the Minister of Munitions and the Clyde Valley Electrical Power Company; and for other purposes.	
Clyde Navigation Order Confirmation Act 1919 (repealed)	9 & 10 Geo. 5. c. xcviii	19 August 1919
An Act to confirm a Provisional Order under the Private Legislation Procedure (Scotland) Act 1899 relating to the Clyde Navigation. (Repealed by Statute Law (Repeals) Act 1986 (c. 12))
	Clyde Navigation Order 1919 Provisional Order to authorise the Trustees of the Clyde Navigation to levy increased Rates Tolls Rents and Charges; and for other purposes.	
Scottish Widows' Fund and Life Assurance Society's Order Confirmation Act 1919 (repealed)	9 & 10 Geo. 5. c. xcix	19 August 1919
An Act to confirm a Provisional Order under the Private Legislation Procedure (Scotland) Act 1899 relating to the Scottish Widows' Fund and Life Assurance Society. (Repealed by Scottish Widows' Fund and Life Assurance Society's Act 1926 (16 & 17 Geo. 5. c. lxxviii))
	Scottish Widows' Fund and Life Assurance Society's Order 1919 Provisional Order to confer further powers on the Scottish Widows' Fund and Life Assurance Society and to amend the Acts relating to the Society.	
Victoria Infirmary Glasgow Act 1888 (Amendment) Order Confirmation Act 1919	9 & 10 Geo. 5. c. c	19 August 1919
An Act to confirm a Provisional Order under the Private Legislation Procedure (Scotland) Act 1899 relating to the Victoria Infirmary of Glasgow.
	Victoria Infirmary Glasgow Act (Amendment) Order 1919	
City and South London Railway Act 1919	9 & 10 Geo. 5. c. ci	19 August 1919
An Act for empowering the City and South London Railway Company to construct new subways and works to raise further money to alter the periods during which the Company may pay interest out of capital and make up dividends on preference capital and for other purposes.
Leicester Corporation Act 1919 (repealed)	9 & 10 Geo. 5. c. cii	19 August 1919
An Act to authorise the mayor aldermen and citizens of the city of Leicester to acquire certain lands for the purpose of a generating station to confer upon them further powers with reference to the holding and disposal of lands to extend the time for the construction of certain authorised tramways and for other purposes. (Repealed by Leicestershire Act 1985 (c. xvii))
Ammanford Gas Act 1919	9 & 10 Geo. 5. c. ciii	20 November 1919
An Act to authorise the acquisition by the Ammanford Gas Company of the undertaking of the Garnant Gas Company to confer further powers on the Ammanford Gas Company and for other purposes.
Granton Harbour Order Confirmation Act 1919 (repealed)	9 & 10 Geo. 5. c. civ	20 November 1919
An Act to confirm a Provisional Order under the Private Legislation Procedure (Scotland) Act 1899 relating to Granton Harbour. (Repealed by Statute Law (Repeals) Act 1986 (c. 12))
	Granton Harbour Order 1919	
Edinburgh Corporation Order Confirmation Act 1919 (repealed)	9 & 10 Geo. 5. c. cv	20 November 1919
An Act to confirm a Provisional Order under the Private Legislation Procedure (Scotland) Act 1899 relating to Edinburgh Corporation. (Repealed by Edinburgh Corporation Order Confirmation Act 1933 (24 & 25 Geo. 5. c. v))
	Edinburgh Corporation Order 1919	
Fraserburgh Harbour (New Works) Order Confirmation Act 1919 (repealed)	9 & 10 Geo. 5. c. cvi	20 November 1919
An Act to confirm a Provisional Order under the Private Legislation Procedure (Scotland) Act 1899 relating to Fraserburgh Harbour. (Repealed by Fraserburgh Harbour Order Confirmation Act 1985 (c. xlv))
	Fraserburgh Harbour (New Works) Order 1919	
Arbroath Harbour Order Confirmation Act 1919	9 & 10 Geo. 5. c. cvii	20 November 1919
An Act to confirm a Provisional Order under the Private Legislation Procedure (Scotland) Act 1899 relating to Arbroath Harbour.
	Arbroath Harbour Order 1919	
Wick Harbour Order Confirmation Act 1919	9 & 10 Geo. 5. c. cviii	20 November 1919
An Act to confirm a Provisional Order under the Private Legislation Procedure (Scotland) Act 1899 relating to Wick Harbour.
	Wick Harbour Order 1919 Provisional Order to authorise the Wick Harbour Trustees to levy increased Rates and Charges; and for other purposes.	
Water Order Confirmation Act 1919	9 & 10 Geo. 5. c. cix	20 November 1919
An Act to confirm a Provisional Order made by the Board of Trade under the Gas and Water Works Facilities Act 1870 relating to West Hampshire Water.
	West Hampshire Water Order 1919	
Scottish Amicable Life Assurance Society's Order Confirmation Act 1919 (repealed)	9 & 10 Geo. 5. c. cx	20 November 1919
An Act to confirm a Provisional Order under the Private Legislation Procedure (Scotland) Act 1899 relating to the Scottish Amicable Life Assurance Society. (Repealed by Statute Law (Repeals) Act 1998 (c. 43))
	Scottish Amicable Life Assurance Society's Order 1919 Provisional Order to confer further powers upon the Scottish Amicable Life Assurance Society; to amend the Scottish Amicable Life Assurance Society's Incorporation Act 1849; (Note: Scottish Amicable Life Assurance Society's Incorporation Act 1849 (12 & 13 Vict. c. xxii)) and to amend and consolidate the provisions of the Deed of Constitution Articles and Regulations of the Society; and for other purposes.	
Provisional Order (City of Cardiff Police and Fire Brigade Pension Funds) Confirmation Act 1919 (repealed)	9 & 10 Geo. 5. c. cxi	23 December 1919
An Act to confirm a Provisional Order under section eight of the Police Act 1893 (Note: Police Act 1893 (56 & 57 Vict. c. 10)) uniting the Police and Fire Brigade Pension Funds of the City of Cardiff. (Repealed by County of South Glamorgan Act 1976 (c. xxxv))
Greenock Improvement Order Confirmation Act 1919	9 & 10 Geo. 5. c. cxii	23 December 1919
An Act to confirm a Provisional Order under the Private Legislation Procedure (Scotland) Act 1899 relating to Greenock Improvement.
	Greenock Improvement Order 1919 Provisional Order to authorise the Construction of Works and the Acquisition of Lands by the Corporation of Greenock and the Closing of the West Harbour of Greenock by the Trustees of the Port and Harbours of Greenock; to confer further powers on the Corporation and the Trustees; and for other purposes.	
Glasgow Water Order Confirmation Act 1919 (repealed)	9 & 10 Geo. 5. c. cxiii	23 December 1919
An Act to confirm a Provisional Order under the Private Legislation Procedure (Scotland) Act 1899 relating to Glasgow Corporation Water. (Repealed by Glasgow Corporation Consolidation (Water, Transport and Markets) Order Confirmation Act 1964 (c. xliii))
	Glasgow Water Order 1919 Provisional Order to authorise the Corporation of the City of Glasgow to construct Waterworks; to borrow money; and for other purposes.	
Ministry of Health Provisional Orders Confirmation (No. 1) Act 1919	9 & 10 Geo. 5. c. cxiv	23 December 1919
An Act to confirm certain Provisional Orders of the Minister of Health relating to the District of the Rhymney Valley Sewerage Board and to Warrington.
	Rhymney Valley Sewerage Board Order 1919	
	Warrington Order 1919	
Military Knights of Windsor Act 1919	9 & 10 Geo. 5. c. cxv	23 December 1919
An Act to make amendments with respect to the Constitution and Endowments of the Foundation of the Military Knights of Windsor.
Swinton and Mexborough Gas Board Act 1919	9 & 10 Geo. 5. c. cxvi	23 December 1919
An Act to confer further powers on the Swinton and Mexborough Gas Board.
Cannock Urban District Council Act 1919 (repealed)	9 & 10 Geo. 5. c. cxvii	23 December 1919
An Act to authorise the urban district council of Cannock to provide and run omnibuses within and beyond the urban district of Cannock and for other purposes. (Repealed by Staffordshire Act 1983 (c. xviii))
Walsall Corporation Act 1919 (repealed)	9 & 10 Geo. 5. c. cxviii	23 December 1919
An Act to confer further powers upon the mayor aldermen and burgesses of the borough of Walsall with regard to their electricity undertaking to authorise the said mayor aldermen and burgesses to provide and work motor omnibuses on additional routes outside the borough to enlarge their powers in relation to the acquisition of lands and to make further provision with regard to the local government and improvement of the borough and for other purposes. (Repealed by Walsall Corporation Act 1969 (c. lviii))
Manchester Corporation Act 1919	9 & 10 Geo. 5. c. cxix	23 December 1919
An Act to empower the lord mayor aldermen and citizens of the city of Manchester to obtain a supply of water from Haweswater and other sources in Westmorland to provide for the transfer to them of the undertaking of the North Cheshire Water Company to make further provision in regard to their water and electricity undertakings and for other purposes.
St. Just (Falmouth) Ocean Wharves and Railways Act 1919 (repealed)	9 & 10 Geo. 5. c. cxx	23 December 1919
An Act to incorporate the St. Just (Falmouth) Ocean Wharves and Railways Company and to empower that Company to construct wharves and railways in the county of Cornwall and for other purposes. (Repealed by St. Just (Falmouth) Ocean Wharves and Railways (Abandonment) Act 1924 (14 & 15 Geo. 5. c. ix))
Shropshire, Worcestershire and Staffordshire Electric Power Act 1919 (repealed)	9 & 10 Geo. 5. c. cxxi	23 December 1919
An Act to empower the Shropshire Worcestershire and Staffordshire Electric Power Company to raise additional capital and for other purposes. (Repealed by Shropshire, Worcestershire and Staffordshire Electric Power (Consolidation) Act 1938 (1 & 2 Geo. 6. c. lviii))
Gosport and Alverstoke Urban District Council Act 1919	9 & 10 Geo. 5. c. cxxii	23 December 1919
An Act to authorise the Gosport and Alverstoke Urban District Council to construct works and to establish a ferry undertaking to provide for the constitution of a joint board of that Council and the council of the county borough of Portsmouth for certain purposes in relation to Portsmouth Harbour and for other purposes.

=== Private and personal acts ===
Short title	Citation	Royal assent
Long title
Clowes Settled Estate Act 1919	9 & 10 Geo. 5. c. 1 Pr.	15 August 1919
An Act for confirming an agreement between the trustees of the Clowes Settled Estates and the Manchester Ship Canal Company for the conveyance to the company of lands forming part of the settled estates in the county of Lancaster in consideration of rentcharges to be created by the company.
Cavendish Clarke Divorce Act 1919 (Note: This act was not printed by the King's Printer)	9 & 10 Geo. 5. c. 2 Pr.	16 April 1919
An Act to dissolve the marriage of George Fitzroy Cavendish Clarke of the Steeple Antrim in the County of Antrim Major in His Majesty's Royal Irish Rifles with Florence Jean Cavendish Clarke his now wife and to enable him to marry again and for other purposes.
Pallin's Divorce Act 1919	9 & 10 Geo. 5. c. 3 Pr.	31 July 1919
An Act to dissolve the marriage of George Roland Alexander Pallin with Clara Eileen his now wife and to enable him to marry again and for other purposes.
Stoney's Divorce Act 1919	9 & 10 Geo. 5. c. 4 Pr.	31 July 1919
An Act to dissolve the marriage of Anna Theodosia Hester Stoney of 69 Adelaide Road Dublin in the county of Dublin with Leigh Sadleir Stoney a Lieutenant-Colonel (retired) in the 4th Battalion Royal Irish Fusiliers her now husband and to enable her to marry again and for other purposes.
Boland's Divorce Act 1919	9 & 10 Geo. 5. c. 5 Pr.	15 August 1919
An Act to dissolve the marriage of Maurice Boland with Annie Boland his now wife and to enable him to marry again and for other purposes.

=== Sources ===
- The Public General Acts Passed in the Ninth and Tenth Years of the Reign of His Majesty King George the Fifth. London: Eyre and Spottiswoode. 1919 – via HathiTrust.
- Journals of the House of Commons (PDF). Vol. 174 (February 1919 - December 1919) – via parliament.uk.

== See also ==
- List of acts of the Parliament of the United Kingdom
