= Trade Marks Act 1905 =

Act of the Parliament of the United Kingdom

Trade Marks Act 1905 (Note: Section 1.)
- Act of Parliament
- Parliament of the United Kingdom
- Long title: An Act to consolidate and amend the Law relating to Trade Marks.
- Citation: 5 Edw. 7. c. 15
- Territorial extent: United Kingdom

Dates
- Royal assent: 11 August 1905
- Commencement: 1 April 1906 (Note: Section 2.)
- Repealed: 27 July 1938 (Note: The commencement of the Trade Marks (Amendment) Act 1937 (1 Edw. 8. & 1 Geo. 6. c. 49).)
Other legislation
Amended by	Trade Marks Act 1914
Repealed by	Trade Marks Act 1919; Statute Law Revision Act 1927; Trade Marks Act 1938

Status: Repealed

The Trade Marks Act 1905 (5 Edw. 7. c. 15) was an act of the Parliament of the United Kingdom that consolidate enactments related to trade marks in the United Kingdom.

== Subsequent developments ==
The act was amended by the Trade Marks Act 1919 (9 & 10 Geo. 5. c. 79), which came into force on 1 April 1920.

Section 73 of, and the schedule to, the act was repealed by section 1 of, and the part I of the schedule to, the Statute Law Revision Act 1927 (17 & 18 Geo. 5. c. 42), which came into force on 22 December 1927.

The whole act, so far as unrepealed, was repealed by section 70(1) of, and the fourth schedule to, the Trade Marks Act 1938 (1 & 2 Geo. 6. c. 22), which came into force on 27 July 1938.
