= Trade Descriptions Act 1968 =

Act of the Parliament of the United Kingdom

Trade Descriptions Act 1968 (Note: Section 43(1).)
- Act of Parliament
- Parliament of the United Kingdom
- Long title: An Act to replace the Merchandise Marks Acts 1887 to 1953 by fresh provisions prohibiting misdescriptions of goods, services, accommodation and facilities provided in the course of trade; to prohibit false or misleading indications as to the price of goods; to confer power to require information on instructions relating to goods to be marked on or to accompany the goods or to be included in advertisements; to prohibit the unauthorised use of devices or emblems signifying royal awards; to enable the Parliament of Northern Ireland to make laws relating to merchandise marks; and for purposes connected with those matters.
- Citation: 1968 c. 29
- Territorial extent: United Kingdom

Dates
- Royal assent: 30 May 1968
- Commencement: 30 November 1968 (Note: Section 43(2).)
Other legislation
Amends	Plant Varieties and Seeds Act 1964
Repeals/revokes	Merchandise Marks Act 1887; Merchandise Marks (Prosecutions) Act 1891; Merchandise Marks Act 1894; Merchandise Marks Act 1911; Merchandise Marks Act 1926; Merchandise Marks Act 1953
Amended by	Road Traffic Act 1972; Statute Law (Repeals) Act 1975; Weights and Measures Act 1985; Consumer Protection Act 1987; Food Safety Act 1990; Manufacture and Storage of Explosives Regulations 2005; Digital Markets, Competition and Consumers Act 2024
Relates to	Property Misdescriptions Act 1991

Status: Partially repealed

Text of statute as originally enacted

Revised text of statute as amended

Text of the Trade Descriptions Act 1968 as in force today (including any amendments) within the United Kingdom, from legislation.gov.uk.

The Trade Descriptions Act 1968 (c. 29) is an act of the Parliament of the United Kingdom which prevents manufacturers, retailers or service industry providers from misleading consumers as to what they are spending their money on. This law empowers the judiciary to punish companies or individuals who make false claims about the products or services that they sell.

Applying a false trade description to goods is a strict liability offence: provided it is shown that the description was applied and was false, the accused has to prove certain defences in order to escape conviction.

False descriptions as to services require the more normal proof of mens rea (guilty intent).

The act excludes matters relating to land and buildings, which were dealt with under the provisions of the Property Misdescriptions Act 1991.

== Changes ==
The act was in conflict with the EU Unfair Commercial Practices Directive, which has been adopted in the UK and was implemented from April 2008.

Although technically the act itself remains in force, most of its specific provisions were repealed and superseded by the Consumer Protection from Unfair Trading Regulations 2008 which came into force 26 May 2008, missing the EU deadline for implementation by 12 June 2007. The repeals and revocations for TDA 1968 are sections 1(1), 5 to 10, 13 to 15, 19(4)(b) and (c), 21(1) and (2), 22, 24(3), 32, 37, and 39(2).

== See also ==
- Crunchy Frog
