= Trade Marks Act 1938 =

Act of the Parliament of the United Kingdom

Trade Marks Act 1938 (Note: Section 71(1).)
- Act of Parliament
- Parliament of the United Kingdom
- Long title: An Act to consolidate the Trade Marks Act, 1905, the Trade Marks Act, 1919, and the Trade Marks (Amendment) Act, 1937.
- Citation: 1 & 2 Geo. 6. c. 22
- Territorial extent: United Kingdom; Isle of Man; (Note: Sections 71(3)–(4).)

Dates
- Royal assent: 13 April 1938
- Commencement: 27 July 1938 (Note: Section 71(2). The commencement of the Trade Marks (Amendment) Act 1937 (1 Edw. 8. & 1 Geo. 6. c. 49).)
- Repealed: 31 October 1994 (Note: The Trade Marks Act 1994 (Commencement) Order 1994 (SI 1994/2550).)
Other legislation
Amends	See § Repealed enactments
Repeals/revokes	See § Repealed enactments
Amended by	Courts Act 1971; Trade Marks (Amendment) Act 1984; Statute Law (Repeals) Act 1986
Repealed by	Trade Marks Act 1994

Status: Repealed

Text of statute as originally enacted

Revised text of statute as amended

The Trade Marks Act 1938 (1 & 2 Geo. 6. c. 22) was an act of the Parliament of the United Kingdom that consolidated enactments related to trade marks in the United Kingdom and Isle of Man.

== Provisions ==
=== Repealed enactments ===
Section 70(1) of the act repealed 3 enactments listed in the fourth schedule to the act.

Citation	Short title	Extent of repeal
5 Edw. 7. c. 15	Trade Marks Act 1905	The whole act, so far as not already repealed.
9 & 10 Geo. 5. c. 79	Trade Marks Act 1919	The whole act, so far as not already repealed.
1 Edw. 8 & 1 Geo. 6. c. 49	Trade Marks (Amendment) Act 1937	The whole act.

== Subsequent developments ==
The whole act was repealed by section 106(2) of, and schedule 5 to, the Trade Marks Act 1994 (c. 26), which came into force on 31 October 1994.
