= Property Misdescriptions Act 1991 =

Act of the Parliament of the United Kingdom

Property Misdescriptions Act 1991 (Note: Section 7(1).)
- Act of Parliament
- Parliament of the United Kingdom
- Long title: An Act to prohibit the making of false or misleading statements about property matters in the course of estate agency business and property development business.
- Citation: 1991 c. 29
- Territorial extent: United Kingdom (Note: Section 7(2).)

Dates
- Royal assent: 27 June 1991
- Commencement: 27 June 1991 (Note: Section 4(b) of the Interpretation Act 1978.)
- Repealed: 1 October 2013
Other legislation
Amended by	Criminal Justice and Police Act 2001; Enterprise Act 2002; Enterprise Act 2002 (Part 9 Restrictions on Disclosure of Information) (Amendment and Specification) Order 2003
Repealed by	Property Misdescriptions Act 1991 (Repeal) Order 2013

Status: Repealed

Text of statute as originally enacted

Revised text of statute as amended

The Property Misdescriptions Act 1991 (c. 29) was an act of the Parliament of the United Kingdom which made it a crime to make a false or misleading statement about certain matters relating to land in the course of an estate agency business or a property development business.

== Provisions ==
Section 1 of the act made the person by whom an estate agency business or property development business was carried on guilty of an offence where a false or misleading statement about a "prescribed matter" was made in the course of the business, other than in providing conveyancing services. An employee whose act or default caused the statement to be made was also guilty of an offence. The offence was punishable by an unlimited fine on conviction on indictment, or a fine not exceeding the statutory maximum on summary conviction. A prescribed matter was any matter relating to land specified in an order made by the Secretary of State, and a statement made in the course of an estate agency business was one made in the course of things done as mentioned in section 1(1) of the Estate Agents Act 1979.

Section 2 of the act provided a defence for a person who showed that he took all reasonable steps and exercised all due diligence to avoid committing the offence, and limited reliance on information given by another. Section 3 of the act gave effect to the schedule on enforcement, which made every local weights and measures authority in Great Britain, and the Department of Economic Development in Northern Ireland, an enforcement authority, with powers to require the production of documents, inspect goods, seize and detain evidence and enter premises, and created offences of obstructing officers, impersonating officers and disclosing information. Section 4 of the act made directors, managers and other officers of a body corporate, and partners in a Scottish partnership, personally liable where an offence was committed with their consent or connivance or through their neglect.

Section 5 of the act prohibited proceedings for an offence after the earlier of three years from the commission of the offence or one year from its discovery by the prosecutor. Section 6 provided for expenditure under the act to be paid out of money provided by Parliament, and section 7 provided the short title and extended the act to Northern Ireland.

== Subsequent developments ==
The Property Misdescriptions (Specified Matters) Order 1992 (SI 1992/2834), made under section 1 of the act, came into force on 4 April 1993 and specified the matters about which a statement could amount to an offence. These included location or address, accommodation and measurements, fixtures and fittings, physical or structural characteristics and condition, the history of the property, and its price.

The whole act was repealed by article 2 of the Property Misdescriptions Act 1991 (Repeal) Order 2013 (SI 2013/1575), which was made on 26 June 2013, laid before Parliament on 28 June 2013 and came into force on 1 October 2013. Customers of estate agents instead needed to rely on the parallel protections under the Consumer Protection from Unfair Trading Regulations 2008, which implemented the EU Unfair Commercial Practices Directive. Those regulations were in turn repealed with effect from 6 April 2025, when Part 4, Chapter 1 of the Digital Markets, Competition and Consumers Act 2024 came into force.
