= Trade Marks Directive =

Directive of the European Union

Directive 2015/2436
- European Union directive
- Title: Trade Mark Directive 2015
- Made by: Council
- Made under: Article 100a

History
- Date made: 2015

Other legislation
- Amended by: see text

The Trade Marks Directive 2015 (2015/2436) harmonises trade mark rights in European Union law.

== History ==
Council Directive No. 89/104/EEC, "to approximate the laws of the Member States relating to trade marks", was introduced into European Union law on 21 December 1988. Its provisions were required to be introduced into national law by 29 December 1991. On this date, the Directive therefore became law with direct effect in each of the member states of the European Union. It was repealed in 2008 by EU Directive 2008/95/EC, which in turn was recast by Directive 2015/2436.

In the UK the Directive was transposed into domestic law by The Trade Marks Regulations 2018 which amended the Trade Marks Act 1994.

== Intention ==
The Directive was intended to approximate the laws of the Member States of the European Union which relate to trade marks and to harmonise disparities in the respective trade mark laws which had the potential to impede the free movement of goods and provision of services, or to distort competition within the European Union. The Directive provided a framework of minimum provisions applicable throughout the European Union but did not seek to impose onerous obligations on national trademark registries. For example, the Directive did not stipulate how member states should deal with the registration, revocation and invalidity of trademarks. These elements were left to the national bodies' discretion.

== Grounds for refusal or invalidity ==
The Directive stipulates that signs cannot be registered if they are:

- devoid of distinctive character
- signs which exclusively indicate the kind, quality, or other characteristics of the goods or services they represent
- customary signs in the trade
- contrary to public policy, or
- deceitful.

== See also ==
- European Union law
- Windsurfing Chiemsee Produktions v. Boots
