= List of acts of the Parliament of the United Kingdom from 1905 =

This is a complete list of acts of the Parliament of the United Kingdom for the year 1905.

Note that the first parliament of the United Kingdom was held in 1801; parliaments between 1707 and 1800 were either parliaments of Great Britain or of Ireland). For acts passed up until 1707, see the list of acts of the Parliament of England and the list of acts of the Parliament of Scotland. For acts passed from 1707 to 1800, see the list of acts of the Parliament of Great Britain. See also the list of acts of the Parliament of Ireland.

For acts of the devolved parliaments and assemblies in the United Kingdom, see the list of acts of the Scottish Parliament, the list of acts of the Northern Ireland Assembly, and the list of acts and measures of Senedd Cymru; see also the list of acts of the Parliament of Northern Ireland.

The number shown after each act's title is its chapter number. Acts passed before 1963 are cited using this number, preceded by the year(s) of the reign during which the relevant parliamentary session was held; thus the Union with Ireland Act 1800 is cited as "39 & 40 Geo. 3 c. 67", meaning the 67th act passed during the session that started in the 39th year of the reign of George III and which finished in the 40th year of that reign. Note that the modern convention is to use Arabic numerals in citations (thus "41 Geo. 3" rather than "41 Geo. III"). Acts of the last session of the Parliament of Great Britain and the first session of the Parliament of the United Kingdom are both cited as "41 Geo. 3". Acts passed from 1963 onwards are simply cited by calendar year and chapter number.

== 5 Edw. 7 ==
The sixth session of the 27th Parliament of the United Kingdom, which met from 14 February 1905 until 11 August 1905.

This session was also traditionally cited as 5 Ed. 7 or 5 E. 7.

=== Public general acts ===
| Short title | Citation | Royal assent |
Long title
| Consolidated Fund (No. 1) Act 1905 (repealed) | 5 Edw. 7. c. 1 | 30 March 1905 |
An Act to apply certain sums out of the Consolidated Fund to the service of the years ending on the thirty first day of March one thousand nine hundred and five and one thousand nine hundred and six. (Repealed by Statute Law Revision Act 1927 (17 & 18 Geo. 5. c. 42))
| Army (Annual) Act 1905 (repealed) | 5 Edw. 7. c. 2 | 14 April 1905 |
An Act to provide, during Twelve Months, for the Discipline and Regulation of the Army. (Repealed by Statute Law Revision Act 1927 (17 & 18 Geo. 5. c. 42))
| Licensing (Ireland) Act 1905 | 5 Edw. 7. c. 3 | 30 June 1905 |
An Act to amend the Law as to the Hours of Closing of Licensed Premises on Christmas Day in Ireland.
| Finance Act 1905 (repealed) | 5 Edw. 7. c. 4 | 30 June 1905 |
An Act to grant certain duties of Customs and Inland Revenue, to alter other duties, and to amend the Law relating to Customs and Inland Revenue and the National Debt, and to make other provisions for the financial arrangements of the year. (Repealed by Statute Law Revision Act 1963 (c. 30))
| Mr. Speaker's Retirement Act 1905 (repealed) | 5 Edw. 7. c. 5 | 11 July 1905 |
An Act to settle and secure an Annuity upon the Right Honourable William Court Gully, in consideration of his eminent Services. (Repealed by Statute Law Revision Act 1927 (17 & 18 Geo. 5. c. 42))
| Consolidated Fund (No. 2) Act 1905 (repealed) | 5 Edw. 7. c. 6 | 11 July 1905 |
An Act to apply a sum out of the Consolidated Fund to the service of the year ending on the thirty-first day of March one thousand nine hundred and six. (Repealed by Statute Law Revision Act 1927 (17 & 18 Geo. 5. c. 42))
| War Stores (Commission) Act 1905 (repealed) | 5 Edw. 7. c. 7 | 11 July 1905 |
An Act to facilitate the proceedings of the Commissioners appointed to hold an Investigation respecting War Stores in South Africa. (Repealed by Statute Law Revision Act 1927 (17 & 18 Geo. 5. c. 42))
| Agricultural Rates Act 1896, &c., Continuance Act 1905 (repealed) | 5 Edw. 7. c. 8 | 4 August 1905 |
An Act to extend the Agricultural Rates Act, 1896, &c., Continuance Act, 1901. (Note: Agricultural Rates Act 1896, &c., Continuance Act 1901 (1 Edw. 7. c. 13)) (Repealed by Expiring Laws Continuance Act 1909 (9 Edw. 7. c. 46))
| Coal Mines (Weighing of Minerals) Act 1905 (repealed) | 5 Edw. 7. c. 9 | 4 August 1905 |
An Act to amend the provisions of the Coal Mines Regulation Act, 1887, (Note: Coal Mines Regulation Act 1887 (50 & 51 Vict. c. 58)) which relate to the Weighing of Minerals. (Repealed by Wages Act 1986 (c. 48))
| Shipowners' Negligence (Remedies) Act 1905 (repealed) | 5 Edw. 7. c. 10 | 4 August 1905 |
An Act to enlarge the Remedies of Persons injured by the Negligence of Shipowners. (Repealed by Administration of Justice Act 1956 (4 & 5 Eliz. 2. c. 46))
| Railway Fires Act 1905 | 5 Edw. 7. c. 11 | 4 August 1905 |
An Act to give Compensation for Damage by Fires caused by Sparks or Cinders from Railway Engines.
| Churches (Scotland) Act 1905 | 5 Edw. 7. c. 12 | 11 August 1905 |
An Act to provide for the Settlement of certain Questions between the Free Church and the United Free Church in Scotland, and to make certain amendments of the law with respect to the Church of Scotland.
| Aliens Act 1905 (repealed) | 5 Edw. 7. c. 13 | 11 August 1905 |
An Act to amend the Law with regard to Aliens. (Repealed by Aliens Restriction (Amendment) Act 1919 (9 & 10 Geo. 5. c. 92))
| Medical Act (1886) Amendment Act 1905 (repealed) | 5 Edw. 7. c. 14 | 11 August 1905 |
An Act to amend the Medical Act, 1886. (Note: Medical Act 1886 (49 & 50 Vict. c. 48)) (Repealed by Medical Act 1956 (4 & 5 Eliz. 2. c. 76))
| Trade Marks Act 1905 (repealed) | 5 Edw. 7. c. 15 | 11 August 1905 |
An Act to consolidate and amend the Law relating to Trade Marks. (Repealed by Trade Marks Act 1919 (9 & 10 Geo. 5. c. 79), Statute Law Revision Act 1927 (17 & 18 Geo. 5. c. 42) and Trade Marks Act 1938 (1 & 2 Geo. 6. c. 22))
| Isle of Man (Customs) Act 1905 (repealed) | 5 Edw. 7. c. 16 | 11 August 1905 |
An Act to amend the Law with respect to Customs Duties in the Isle of Man. (Repealed by Statute Law Revision Act 1927 (17 & 18 Geo. 5. c. 42))
| Appropriation Act 1905 (repealed) | 5 Edw. 7. c. 17 | 11 August 1905 |
An Act to apply certain sums out of the Consolidated Fund to the service of the years ending on the thirty-first day of March one thousand nine hundred and four and one thousand nine hundred and six, and to appropriate the Supplies granted in this Session of Parliament. (Repealed by Statute Law Revision Act 1927 (17 & 18 Geo. 5. c. 42))
| Unemployed Workmen Act 1905 (repealed) | 5 Edw. 7. c. 18 | 11 August 1905 |
An Act to establish organisation with a view to the provision of Employment or Assistance for Unemployed Workmen in proper cases. (Repealed by Local Government Act 1929 (19 & 20 Geo. 5. c. 17) and Local Government (Scotland) Act 1929 (19 & 20 Geo. 5. c. 25))
| East India Loans (Railways) Act 1905 (repealed) | 5 Edw. 7. c. 19 | 11 August 1905 |
An Act to empower the Secretary of State in Council of India to raise money in the United Kingdom for the construction, extension and equipment of Railways in India, by State Agency, or through the Agency of Companies, and for other purposes. (Repealed by East India Loans Act 1937 (1 Edw. 8 & 1 Geo. 6. c. 14))
| Naval Works Act 1905 (repealed) | 5 Edw. 7. c. 20 | 11 August 1905 |
An Act to make further provision for the construction of works in the United Kingdom and elsewhere for the purposes of the Royal Navy. (Repealed by Statute Law Revision Act 1927 (17 & 18 Geo. 5. c. 42))
| Expiring Laws Continuance Act 1905 (repealed) | 5 Edw. 7. c. 21 | 11 August 1905 |
An Act to continue various Expiring Laws. (Repealed by Statute Law Revision Act 1927 (17 & 18 Geo. 5. c. 42))
| Public Works Loans Act 1905 (repealed) | 5 Edw. 7. c. 22 | 11 August 1905 |
An Act to grant Money for the purpose of certain Local Loans out of the Local Loans Fund, and for other purposes relating to Local Loans. (Repealed by Statute Law Revision Act 1927 (17 & 18 Geo. 5. c. 42))
| Provisional Order (Marriages) Act 1905 | 5 Edw. 7. c. 23 | 11 August 1905 |
An Act to enable Provisional Orders to be made for removing any invalidity or doubt attaching to Marriages by reason of some informality.

=== Local acts ===
| Short title | Citation | Royal assent |
Long title
| Leeds Corporation (Consolidation) Act 1905 | 5 Edw. 7. c. i | 14 April 1905 |
An Act to consolidate with amendments certain of the Local Acts in force within the city of Leeds to make further provision in regard to the various undertakings of the Corporation and to make better provision for the health and local government of the city and for other purposes.
| Local Government Board's Provisional Orders Confirmation (No. 1) Act 1905 | 5 Edw. 7. c. ii | 14 April 1905 |
An Act to confirm certain Provisional Orders of the Local Government Board relating to Ashton-in-Makerfield Burslem Newbury Southport and Ulverston.
| | Ashton-in-Makerfield Order 1905 Provisional Order for altering the Ashton-in-Makerfield Local Board Act 1875 (Note: Ashton-in-Makerfield Local Board Act 1875 (38 & 39 Vict. c. xxxviii)) and certain Confirming Acts. | |
| | Burslem Order 1905 Provisional Order for altering the Burslem Local Board Gas Act 1877. (Note: Burslem Local Board Gas Act 1877 (40 & 41 Vict. c. ccviii)) | |
| | Newbury Order 1905 Provisional Order for altering a Confirming Act. (Note: Local Government Board's Provisional Orders Confirmation (No. 4) Act 1893 (56 & 57 Vict. c. cxv)) | |
| | Southport Order 1905 Provisional Order for altering the Southport Improvement Act 1871 (Note: Southport Improvement Act 1871 (34 & 35 Vict. c. cxl)) and a Confirming Act. (Note: Local Government Board's Provisional Orders Confirmation (No. 6) Act 1895 (58 & 59 Vict. c. lxxxvii)) | |
| | Ulverston Order 1905 Provisional Order for altering the Ulverston Local Board Act 1874 (Note: Ulverston Local Board Act 1874 (37 & 38 Vict. c. cliv)) and certain Confirming Acts. | |
| Walker and Wallsend Union Gas Act 1905 | 5 Edw. 7. c. iii | 30 June 1905 |
An Act to empower the Walker and Wallsend Union Gas Company to acquire additional lands and construct additional works and for other purposes.
| Southampton and Winchester Great Western Junction Railway (Abandonment) Act 1905 (repealed) | 5 Edw. 7. c. iv | 30 June 1905 |
An Act for the abandonment of the Southampton and Winchester Great Western Junction Railway. (Repealed by Statute Law (Repeals) Act 2013 (c. 2))
| Cordoba and Rosario Railway Company Limited Act 1905 | 5 Edw. 7. c. v | 30 June 1905 |
An Act for authorising the Cordoba and Rosario Railway Company Limited to increase its capital and to fund the arrears of dividends on its preferred shares by the issue of fully paid second preferred shares and for other purposes.
| Entre Rios Railways Company Limited Act 1905 | 5 Edw. 7. c. vi | 30 June 1905 |
An Act for authorising the Entre Rios Railways Company Limited to increase its capital and to fund the arrears of dividends on its preference shares by the issue of fully paid second preference stock and for other purposes.
| Marylebone Chapels (Saint Paul Great Portland Street and Saint Peter Vere Street) Act 1905 or the Marylebone Chapels (St. Paul, Great Portland Street and St. Peter, Vere Street) Act 1905 | 5 Edw. 7. c. vii | 30 June 1905 |
An Act to provide for the sale of the Chapel of Saint Paul Great Portland Street and for the endowment of the Chapel of Saint Peter Vere Street in the event of that chapel having a district assigned to it and for other purposes connected therewith.
| West Cumberland Electric Tramways Act 1905 | 5 Edw. 7. c. viii | 30 June 1905 |
An Act to further extend the periods for the commencement of the construction and for the completion of the tramways tramroads and other works and for the taking of lands authorised by the West Cumberland Electric Tramways Act 1901 (Note: West Cumberland Electric Tramways Act 1901 (1 Edw. 7. c. ccli)) to extend the period limited by the West Cumberland Electric Tramways Act 1903 (Note: West Cumberland Electric Tramways Act 1903 (3 Edw. 7. c. cviii)) within which distributing mains for the supply of electricity were to be laid down and for other purposes.
| Holy Trinity Portsea Act 1905 | 5 Edw. 7. c. ix | 30 June 1905 |
An Act for uniting the ecclesiastical parish of Holy Trinity Portsea with one or more contiguous parishes and for authorising and carrying into effect an agreement between the Bishop of Winchester and the Admiralty for the sale of the church and vicarage house of Holy Trinity Portsea and for the disposal of the purchase-money and the endowments of the benefice and for other purposes connected therewith.
| Brompton, Chatham, Gillingham and Rochester Water Act 1905 | 5 Edw. 7. c. x | 30 June 1905 |
An Act to confer further powers upon the Brompton Chatham Gillingham and Rochester Waterworks Company and for other purposes.
| Commercial Union Assurance Company Limited Act 1905 | 5 Edw. 7. c. xi | 30 June 1905 |
An Act to effect a fusion of the undertaking of the Hand-in-Hand Fire and Life Insurance Society with that of the Commercial Union Assurance Company Limited and for other purposes.
| Mortgage Insurance Corporation Limited Act 1905 | 5 Edw. 7. c. xii | 30 June 1905 |
An Act to extend the periods prescribed by the scheme of arrangement relating to the Mortgage Insurance Corporation Limited for the liquidation of their affairs and for other purposes.
| Truro Water Act 1905 | 5 Edw. 7. c. xiii | 30 June 1905 |
An Act to authorise the Truro Water Company to construct additional waterworks acquire lands and raise further moneys and for other purposes.
| Hastings Harbour Act 1905 (repealed) | 5 Edw. 7. c. xiv | 30 June 1905 |
An Act to revive and extend the period limited for the compulsory purchase of lands and to extend the period limited for the construction and completion of the Harbour and Works authorised by the Hastings Harbour Act 1890 (Note: Hastings Harbour Act 1890 (53 & 54 Vict. c. cxliii)) and the Hastings Harbour Act 1897 (Note: Hastings Harbour Act 1897 (60 & 61 Vict. c. cxii)) and for other purposes. (Repealed by Statute Law (Repeals) Act 2013 (c. 2))
| Weybridge and Walton-upon-Thames Electric Supply Act 1905 | 5 Edw. 7. c. xv | 30 June 1905 |
An Act to confer further powers upon the Urban Electric Supply Company Limited with respect to their electric lighting undertakings in the urban districts of Weybridge and Walton-upon-Thames respectively and for other purposes.
| Chelsea Electricity Supply Company's Act 1905 | 5 Edw. 7. c. xvi | 30 June 1905 |
An Act for providing for the extinction of the founders' shares of the Chelsea Electricity Supply Company Limited and the substitution therefor of ordinary shares in the capital of that Company and for other purposes.
| Epping Gas Act 1905 (repealed) | 5 Edw. 7. c. xvii | 30 June 1905 |
An Act for incorporating and conferring powers on the Epping Gas Company and for other purposes. (Repealed by Bishop's Stortford, Harlow and Epping Gas and Electricity Act 1910 (10 Edw. 7 & 1 Geo. 5. c. xvii))
| South Suburban Gas Act 1905 (repealed) | 5 Edw. 7. c. xviii | 30 June 1905 |
An Act to make further provisions with respect to the Undertaking of the South Suburban Gas Company. (Repealed by South Suburban Gas Act 1928 (18 & 19 Geo. 5. c. lxxx))
| Nottingham and Retford Railway (Extension of Time, &c.) Act 1905 | 5 Edw. 7. c. xix | 30 June 1905 |
An Act to extend the time for the purchase of lands for and the completion of railways authorised by the Nottingham and Retford Railway Act 1902 (Note: Nottingham and Retford Railway Act 1902 (2 Edw. 7. c. cxli)) to amend that Act in various respects and for other purposes.
| Leeds and Liverpool Canal Act 1905 | 5 Edw. 7. c. xx | 30 June 1905 |
An Act to extend the time for the construction of certain works authorised by the Leeds and Liverpool Canal Act 1891 to confer further powers on the Leeds and Liverpool Canal Company and for other purposes.
| Metropolitan District Railway Act 1905 | 5 Edw. 7. c. xxi | 30 June 1905 |
An Act to confer further powers on the Metropolitan District Railway Company and for other purposes.
| Orphan Working School and Alexandra Orphanage Act 1905 (repealed) | 5 Edw. 7. c. xxii | 30 June 1905 |
An Act to confirm the amalgamation of the institutions known as the Orphan Working School the Alexandra Orphanage for Infants and the Convalescent Seaside Home for Orphans to alter the name of the president vice-presidents treasurer and governors of the Orphan Working School to vest in them the property of the Alexandra Orphanage for Infants to confer further powers on them and for other purposes. (Repealed by Royal Alexandra and Albert School Act 1949 (12, 13 & 14 Geo. 6. c. xviii))
| East Cowes Gas Act 1905 | 5 Edw. 7. c. xxiii | 30 June 1905 |
An Act for incorporating and conferring powers on the East Cowes Gas Company.
| Hastings Harbour District Railway (Abandonment) Act 1905 | 5 Edw. 7. c. xxiv | 30 June 1905 |
An Act for the abandonment of the railways and works authorised by the Hastings Harbour District Railway Acts 1897 (Note: Hastings Harbour District Railway Act 1897 (60 & 61 Vict. c. ccii)) and 1903. (Note: Hastings Harbour District Railway Act 1903 (3 Edw. 7. c. ccxl))
| Tyneside Tramways and Tramroads Act 1905 | 5 Edw. 7. c. xxv | 30 June 1905 |
An Act to enable the Tyneside Tramways and Tramroads Company to create and issue additional preference shares and for other purposes.
| Tralee Urban District Council Act 1905 | 5 Edw. 7. c. xxvi | 30 June 1905 |
An Act to amend and define the borrowing powers of the Urban District Council of Tralee in the county of Kerry and to enable them to borrow additional moneys and for other purposes.
| Clay Cross Railway (Abandonment) Act 1905 (repealed) | 5 Edw. 7. c. xxvii | 30 June 1905 |
An Act for the abandonment of the Clay Cross Railway and for other purposes. (Repealed by Statute Law (Repeals) Act 2013 (c. 2))
| Berkhampstead Gas Act 1905 | 5 Edw. 7. c. xxviii | 30 June 1905 |
An Act for incorporating and conferring powers upon the Berkhampstead Gas Company and for other purposes.
| Mexborough and Swinton Tramways Act 1905 | 5 Edw. 7. c. xxix | 30 June 1905 |
An Act to extend the time for the compulsory purchase of lands and for the construction of the tramways and works authorised by the Mexborough and Swinton Tramways Act 1902 (Note: Mexborough and Swinton Tramways Act 1902 (2 Edw. 7. c. ccxxx)) and the Rawmarsh Urban District Council (Tramways) Act 1900 (Note: Rawmarsh Urban District Council (Tramways) Act 1900 (63 & 64 Vict. c. cxxxv)) and for other purposes.
| Wrexham Gas Act 1905 | 5 Edw. 7. c. xxx | 30 June 1905 |
An Act for conferring further powers upon the Wrexham Gas Light Company.
| Dublin Corporation (Superannuation) Act 1905 | 5 Edw. 7. c. xxxi | 30 June 1905 |
An Act to enable the Corporation of the city of Dublin to grant pensions or other superannuation allowances to artisans workmen labourers and servants in their service in certain cases and for other purposes.
| South Oxfordshire Water and Gas Act 1905 | 5 Edw. 7. c. xxxii | 30 June 1905 |
An Act for incorporating and conferring powers on the South Oxfordshire Water and Gas Company.
| Clyde Navigation Act 1905 | 5 Edw. 7. c. xxxiii | 30 June 1905 |
An Act to transfer the Renfrew Harbour Undertaking to the Trustees of the Clyde Navigation to abandon the Works authorised by the Renfrew Burgh and Harbour Extension Act 1899 (Note: Renfrew Burgh and Harbour Extension Act 1899 (62 & 63 Vict. c. ccxiv)) and for other purposes.
| Great Eastern Railway Act 1905 | 5 Edw. 7. c. xxxiv | 30 June 1905 |
An Act for conferring further powers on the Great Eastern Railway Company for enabling the Great Northern and Great Eastern Joint Committee to acquire additional lands for extending the periods limited for the completion of works by the Company the Hertfordshire County Council and the Epping Rural District Council and for the purchase of lands by the Company and for other purposes.
| Loughborough Corporation Act 1905 | 5 Edw. 7. c. xxxv | 30 June 1905 |
An Act to extend the time limited for the construction of Waterworks by the Loughborough Corporation Act 1897 (Note: Loughborough Corporation Act 1897 (60 & 61 Vict. c. xxviii)) and to enable the Corporation to purchase further lands and to borrow further moneys for their Waterworks and for other purposes.
| Norwich Union Life Insurance Society Act 1905 | 5 Edw. 7. c. xxxvi | 30 June 1905 |
An Act to alter the constitution of the Norwich Union Life Insurance Society by substituting a Memorandum and Articles of Association for its existing Laws and Regulations and to repeal the Norwich Union Life Insurance Society Act 1891 (Note: Norwich Union Life Insurance Society Act 1891 (54 & 55 Vict. c. xxxvi)) and for other purposes.
| Higham and Hundred of Hoo Water Act 1905 (repealed) | 5 Edw. 7. c. xxxvii | 30 June 1905 |
An Act to empower the Higham and Hundred of Hoo Water Company to raise Additional Capital and for other purposes. (Repealed by Kent Water Act 1955 (4 & 5 Eliz. 2. c. xi))
| South Metropolitan Gas Act 1905 | 5 Edw. 7. c. xxxviii | 30 June 1905 |
An Act to empower the South Metropolitan Gas Company to purchase lands and for other purposes.
| Ilfracombe Harbour and Improvement Act 1905 | 5 Edw. 7. c. xxxix | 30 June 1905 |
An Act to confirm an agreement for the acquisition by the Ilfracombe Urban District Council of part and the lease (with an option of purchase) of the remainder of the Ilfracombe Pier and Harbour Undertaking including Lantern Hill and other lands held therewith and to enable the Council to carry out street improvements and to make further and better provision for the improvement health local government and finance of the district and for other purposes.
| Accrington District Gas and Water Board Act 1905 (repealed) | 5 Edw. 7. c. xl | 30 June 1905 |
An Act to authorise the Accrington District Gas and Water Board to make new water works to extend their limits of supply for gas and water and for other purposes. (Repealed by County of Lancashire Act 1984 (c. xxi))
| Hull and Barnsley Railway Act 1905 | 5 Edw. 7. c. xli | 30 June 1905 |
An Act to extend the time for the purchase of lands and completion of works authorised by the Hull Barnsley and West Riding Junction Railway and Dock (South Yorkshire Extension Lines) Act 1902 (Note: Hull, Barnsley and West Riding Junction Railway and Dock (South Yorkshire Extension Lines) Act 1902 (2 Edw. 7. c. ccxvii)) to amend the Acts relating to the Hull Barnsley and West Riding Junction Railway and Dock Company and for other purposes.
| Otley Improvement Act 1905 (repealed) | 5 Edw. 7. c. xlii | 30 June 1905 |
An Act to make further and better provision with regard to the Improvement Health Local Government and Finance of the Urban District of Otley and for other purposes. (Repealed by West Yorkshire Act 1980 (c. xiv))
| Accrington Corporation Act 1905 | 5 Edw. 7. c. xliii | 30 June 1905 |
An Act to authorise the Corporation of Accrington to construct and work Tramways to execute street works and improvements and to make further provision for the improvement local government and health of the Borough of Accrington and for other purposes.
| Aylesbury Gas Act 1905 | 5 Edw. 7. c. xliv | 30 June 1905 |
An Act for Incorporating and Conferring Powers on the Aylesbury Gas Company.
| Croydon Gas Act 1905 | 5 Edw. 7. c. xlv | 30 June 1905 |
An Act to provide for the transfer to the Croydon Gas Company of the Undertaking of the Caterham and District Gas Company to extend the limits of supply of the Croydon Gas Company to authorise that Company to raise additional Capital and for other purposes.
| Aberdare Urban District Council Act 1905 | 5 Edw. 7. c. xlvi | 30 June 1905 |
An Act to enable the Aberdare Urban District Council to make and maintain Street Improvements and for other purposes.
| Colne Corporation Act 1905 | 5 Edw. 7. c. xlvii | 30 June 1905 |
An Act for making further and better provision in regard to the markets and the supply of gas water and electricity by the Corporation of Colne and the improvement health and good government of the Borough and for other purposes.
| North Sussex Gas Act 1905 (repealed) | 5 Edw. 7. c. xlviii | 30 June 1905 |
An Act to incorporate the North Sussex Gas Company and to enable that Company to supply with Gas certain parishes in the county of Sussex. (Repealed by Billingshurst Gas Order 1940 (SR&O 1940/1915))
| South Wales Electrical Power Distribution Company Act 1905 | 5 Edw. 7. c. xlix | 30 June 1905 |
An Act to transfer to and vest in the South Wales Electrical Power Distribution Company the undertaking of the Carmarthenshire Electric Power Company and for other purposes.
| London United Tramways Act 1905 | 5 Edw. 7. c. l | 30 June 1905 |
An Act to extend the time limited by the London United Tramways Act 1901 (Note: London United Tramways Act 1901 (1 Edw. 7. c. cclx)) and the London United Tramways Act 1902 (Note: London United Tramways Act 1902 (2 Edw. 7. c. ccxlvii)) for the construction of tramways and the acquisition of lands.
| Alexandra Park and Palace Act 1905 (repealed) | 5 Edw. 7. c. li | 30 June 1905 |
An Act to empower the County Council of Middlesex to pay certain sums agreed to be paid by them to the Alexandra Park Trustees and for other purposes. (Repealed by Alexandra Park and Palace Order 1966 (SI 1966/199))
| Metropolitan Railway Act 1905 | 5 Edw. 7. c. lii | 30 June 1905 |
An Act for vesting the undertaking of the Harrow and Uxbridge Railway Company in the Metropolitan Railway Company to provide for the consolidation of certain preference stocks of the Company to raise additional capital and for other purposes.
| Barry Railway Act 1905 | 5 Edw. 7. c. liii | 30 June 1905 |
An Act to confer further powers on the Barry Railway Company.
| Clacton Improvement Act 1905 (repealed) | 5 Edw. 7. c. liv | 30 June 1905 |
An Act to confer further powers on the Urban District Council of Clacton in regard to the Seashore Recreation Grounds and other matters and to make further and better provisions in regard to the health local government and improvement of their district and for other purposes. (Repealed by Essex Act 1987 (c.xx))
| Dearne Valley Railway Act 1905 | 5 Edw. 7. c. lv | 30 June 1905 |
An Act to extend the time limited for the construction of works authorised by the Dearne Valley Railway Act 1897 to authorise alterations in such works to confer further powers upon the Dearne Valley Railway Company and for other purposes.
| Croydon Corporation Act 1905 (repealed) | 5 Edw. 7. c. lvi | 30 June 1905 |
An Act to divide the west ward of the county borough of Croydon and to increase the number of aldermen and councillors to authorise the corporation of the borough to construct and work additional tramways and to execute certain street improvements to make further provision for the government and for the preservation of the health of the inhabitants of the borough and for other purposes. (Repealed by Croydon Corporation Act 1960 (8 & 9 Eliz. 2. c. xl))
| Stockport Corporation Act 1905 (repealed) | 5 Edw. 7. c. lvii | 30 June 1905 |
An Act to confer further powers upon the Mayor Aldermen and Burgesses of the County Borough of Stockport with reference to the construction of waterworks and otherwise for the better local government and improvement of the borough and to make provision with reference to the borrowing powers of the Corporation and for other purposes. (Repealed by Building Regulations (Local Enactments) Order 1966 (SI 1966/563))
| Birmingham Corporation Act 1905 | 5 Edw. 7. c. lviii | 30 June 1905 |
An Act to empower the Corporation of Birmingham to construct additional tramways to make certain street works to amend certain provisions of the Acts relating to their waterworks undertaking and for other purposes.
| Brentwood Gas Act 1905 | 5 Edw. 7. c. lix | 30 June 1905 |
An Act for incorporating and conferring powers on the Brentwood Gas Company.
| Darien Gold Mining Company Limited Act 1905 | 5 Edw. 7. c. lx | 30 June 1905 |
An Act to regulate the capital of the Darien Gold Mining Company Limited and for other purposes,
| Leven Patent Act 1905 | 5 Edw. 7. c. lxi | 30 June 1905 |
An Act for rendering valid certain letters patent granted to Adolph Leven in respect of an invention for improvements in appliances for protection against projectiles.
| Rhymney Railway Act 1905 | 5 Edw. 7. c. lxii | 30 June 1905 |
An Act to confer further powers upon the Rhymney Railway Company for the acquisition of lands the construction of works and the raising of capital and for other purposes.
| Morley Corporation Act 1905 (repealed) | 5 Edw. 7. c. lxiii | 30 June 1905 |
An Act to confer further powers upon the Mayor Aldermen and Burgesses of the borough of Morley in relation to their water and electric lighting undertakings and to make further provision in regard to the health improvement and good government of the said borough and for other purposes. (Repealed by West Yorkshire Act 1980 (c. xiv))
| Metropolitan Police Provisional Order Confirmation Act 1905 (repealed) | 5 Edw. 7. c. lxiv | 30 June 1905 |
An Act to confirm a Provisional Order made by one of His Majesty's Principal Secretaries of State under the Metropolitan Police Act 1886 (Note: Metropolitan Police Act 1886 (49 & 50 Vict. c. 22)) relating to lands in the parishes of Erith and Barking. (Repealed by Statute Law (Repeals) Act 2008 (c. 12))
| Alexander Scott's Hospital Order Confirmation Act 1905 | 5 Edw. 7. c. lxv | 30 June 1905 |
An Act to confirm a Provisional Order under the Private Legislation Procedure (Scotland) Act 1899 (Note: Private Legislation Procedure (Scotland) Act 1899 (62 & 63 Vict. c. 47)) relating to Alexander Scott's Hospital.
| | Alexander Scott's Hospital Order 1905 Provisional Order to extend the qualifications for the admission of Inmates to Alexander Scott's Hospital to amalgamate the Trust Funds administered by the Trustees and Managers of the Hospital and for other purposes. | |
| Grangemouth Waterworks and Burgh Extension Order Confirmation Act 1905 | 5 Edw. 7. c. lxvi | 30 June 1905 |
An Act to confirm a Provisional Order under the Private Legislation Procedure (Scotland) Act 1899 relating to Grangemouth Waterworks and Burgh Extension.
| | Grangemouth Waterworks and Burgh Extension Order 1905 Provisional Order to construct additional Waterworks to abandon certain authorised Works to extend the Boundaries of the Burgh of Grangemouth and for other purposes. | |
| Arbroath Corporation Water Order Confirmation Act 1905 | 5 Edw. 7. c. lxvii | 30 June 1905 |
An Act to confirm a Provisional Order under the Private Legislation Procedure (Scotland) Act 1899 relating to Arbroath Corporation Water.
| | Arbroath Corporation Water Order 1905 Provisional Order to authorise the Provost Magistrates and Councillors of the Burgh of Aberbrothock or Arbroath to construct and maintain additional waterworks and for other purposes. | |
| Dundee Water Order Confirmation Act 1905 (repealed) | 5 Edw. 7. c. lxviii | 30 June 1905 |
An Act to confirm a Provisional Order under the Private Legislation Procedure (Scotland) Act 1899 relating to Dundee Water. (Repealed by Dundee Corporation (Water, Transport, Finance, &c.) Order Confirmation Act 1954 (2 & 3 Eliz. 2. c. ix))
| | Dundee Water Order 1905 Provisional Order to empower the Dundee Water Commissioners to construct additional Waterworks to further extend their limits of supply and of compulsory supply and for other purposes. | |
| Local Government Board's Provisional Orders Confirmation (No. 2) Act 1905 | 5 Edw. 7. c. lxix | 30 June 1905 |
An Act to confirm certain Provisional Orders of the Local Government Board relating to the Counties of Anglesey Middlesex and Stafford.
| | County of Anglesey Order 1905 | |
| | County of Middlesex Order 1905 | |
| | County of Stafford Order 1905 Provisional Order made in pursuance of sub-section (2) of Section 69 of the Local Government Act 1888. (Note: Local Government Act 1888 (51 & 52 Vict. c. 41)) | |
| Local Government Board's Provisional Orders Confirmation (No. 3) Act 1905 | 5 Edw. 7. c. lxx | 30 June 1905 |
An Act to confirm certain Provisional Orders of the Local Government Board relating to Milford Haven Sheringham Stalybridge and Swinton.
| | Milford Haven Order 1905 Provisional Order for altering certain Local Acts and a Confirming Act. (Note: Local Government Board's Provisional Orders Confirmation (No. 3) Act 1890 (53 & 54 Vict. c. lxxxii)) | |
| | Sheringham Order 1905 Provisional Order for altering the Sheringham and Beeston Protection Act 1898. (Note: Sheringham and Beeston Protection Act 1898 (61 & 62 Vict. c. lxxiii)) | |
| | Stalybridge Order 1905 Provisional Order for altering the Stalybridge and Mossley Gas Act 1885. (Note: Stalybridge and Mossley Gas Act 1885 (48 & 49 Vict. c. cxlviii)) | |
| | Swinton Order 1905 Provisional Order for altering the Swinton Local Board Act 1894. (Note: Swinton Local Board Act 1894 (57 & 58 Vict. c. xcvii)) | |
| Local Government Board's Provisional Orders Confirmation (No. 4) Act 1905 | 5 Edw. 7. c. lxxi | 30 June 1905 |
An Act to confirm certain Provisional Orders of the Local Government Board relating to Birkenhead Bradford (Yorkshire) Chester Derby Leek Ossett and Plymouth.
| | Birkenhead Order 1905 Provisional Order for altering the Birkenhead Corporation Act 1902. (Note: Birkenhead Corporation Act 1902 (2 Edw. 7. c. lxii)) | |
| | Bradford Order 1905 Provisional Order for altering the Bradford Corporation Act 1901. (Note: Bradford Corporation Act 1901 (1 Edw. 7. c. cci)) | |
| | Chester Order 1905 Provisivnal Order for altering the Chester Improvement Act 1884. (Note: Chester Improvement Act 1884 (47 & 48 Vict. c. ccxxxix)) | |
| | Derby Order 1905 Provisivnal Order for altering the Derby Corporation Act 1882 (Note: Derby Corporation Act 1882 (45 & 46 Vict. c. ccxlv)) the Derby Corporation Tramways &c. Act 1899 (Note: Derby Corporation Tramways, &c. Act 1899 (62 & 63 Vict. c. cxciii)) and the Derby Corporation Act 1901. (Note: Derby Corporation Act 1901 (1 Edw. 7. c. cclxvii)) | |
| | Leek Order 1905 Provisional Order for partially repealing and altering the Leek Improvement Act 1855. (Note: Leek Improvement Act 1855 (18 & 19 Vict. c. cxxxii)) | |
| | Ossett Order 1905 Provisional Order for altering the Ossett-cum-Gawthorpe Local Board Act 1875. (Note: Ossett-cum-Gawthorpe Local Board Act 1875 (38 & 39 Vict. c. lxix)) | |
| | Plymouth Order 1905 Provisional Order for altering certain Local Acts. | |
| Local Government Board's Provisional Orders Confirmation (No. 5) Act 1905 | 5 Edw. 7. c. lxxii | 30 June 1905 |
An Act to confirm certain Provisional Orders of the Local Government Board relating to Brentford Ealing Hanwell Heston and Isleworth Sale Sheffield and Sunderland.
| | Brentford Order 1905 Provisional Order to enable the Urban District Council of Brentford to put in force the Compulsory Clauses of the Lands Clauses Acts. | |
| | Ealing Order 1905 Provisional Order to enable the Urban District Council for the Borough of Ealing to put in force the Compulsory Clauses of the Lands Clauses Acts. | |
| | Hanwell Order 1905 Provisional Order to enable the Urban District Council of Hanwell to put in force the Compulsory Clauses of the Lands Clauses Acts. | |
| | Heston and Isleworth Order 1905 Provisional Order to enable the Urban District Council of Heston and Isleworth to put in force the Compulsory Clauses of the Lands Clauses Acts. | |
| | Sale Order 1905 Provisional Order to enable the Urban District Council of Sale to put in force the Compulsory Clauses of the Lands Clauses Acts. | |
| | Sheffield Order 1905 Provisional Order to enable the Urban Sanitary Authority for the City of Sheffield to put in force the Compulsory Clauses of the Lands Clauses Acts. | |
| | Sunderland Order 1905 Provisional Order to enable the Urban Sanitary Authority for the Borough of Sunderland to put in force the Compulsory Clauses of the Lands Clauses Acts. | |
| Local Government Board's Provisional Orders Confirmation (No. 6) Act 1905 | 5 Edw. 7. c. lxxiii | 30 June 1905 |
An Act to confirm certain Provisional Orders of the Local Government Board relating to Banbury (Rural) Lunesdale (Rural) and Newport Pagnell (Rural) and the Easington and Sedgefield the Lanchester and the Stone Joint Hospital Districts.
| | Banbury Rural Order 1905 Provisional Order to enable the Rural District Council of Banbury to put in force the Compulsory Clauses of the Lands Clauses Acts. | |
| | Lunesdale Rural Order 1905 Provisional Order to enable the Rural District Council of Lunesdale to put in force the Compulsory Clauses of the Lands Clauses Acts. | |
| | Newport Pagnell Rural Order 1905 Provisional Order to enable the Rural District Council of Newport Pagnell to put in force the Compulsory Clauses of the Lands Clauses Acts. | |
| | Easington and Sedgefield Joint Small-Pox Hospital Order 1905 Provisional Order for forming a United District under Section 279 of the Public Health Act 1875. (Note: Public Health Act 1875 (38 & 39 Vict. c. 55)) | |
| | Lanchester Joint Hospital Order 1905 Provisional Order for altering certain Confirming Acts. | |
| | Stone Joint Hospital Order 1905 Provisional Order for altering certain Confirming Acts. | |
| Local Government Board's Provisional Orders Confirmation (No. 7) Act 1905 | 5 Edw. 7. c. lxxiv | 30 June 1905 |
An Act to confirm certain Provisional Orders of the Local Government Board relating to Carmarthen Hexham Liverpool Lymm Nantwich and Widnes.
| | Carmarthen Order 1905 Provisional Order for altering the Carmarthen Improvement Act 1898. (Note: Carmarthen Improvement Act 1898 (61 & 62 Vict. c. cviii)) | |
| | Hexham Order 1905 Provisional Order for the alteration of the Hexham Local Board (Water) Act 1888 (Note: Hexham Local Board (Water) Act 1888 (51 & 52 Vict. c. cliv)) and certain Confirming Acts. | |
| | Liverpool Order 1905 Provisional Order for altering the Liverpool Corporation Act 1902. (Note: Liverpool Corporation Act 1902 (2 Edw. 7. c. ccxl)) | |
| | Lymm Gas Order 1905 Provisional Order for altering the Lymm Local Board (Gas) Act 1872. (Note: Lymm Local Board (Gas) Act 1872 (35 & 36 Vict. c. lxxv)) | |
| | Nantwich Order 1905 Provisional Order for altering the Nantwich Urban District Council Act 1903. (Note: Nantwich Urban District Council Act 1903 (3 Edw. 7. c. civ)) | |
| | Widnes Order 1905 Provisional Order for altering the Widnes Improvement Act 1867 (Note: Widnes Improvement Act 1867 (30 & 31 Vict. c. cxxvi)) and the Widnes Local Board Act 1875. (Note: Widnes Local Board Act 1875 (38 & 39 Vict. c. lxxxviii)) | |
| Local Government Board's Provisional Orders Confirmation (No. 9) Act 1905 | 5 Edw. 7. c. lxxv | 30 June 1905 |
An Act to confirm certain Provisional Orders of the Local Government Board relating to Billericay (Rural) Eton (Rural) (two) and the Houghton-le-Spring and Hetton and the Rugby Joint Hospital Districts.
| | Billericay Rural Order 1905 Provisional Order to enable the Rural District Council of Billericay to put in force the Compulsory Clauses of the Lands Clauses Acts. | |
| | Eton Rural (Burnham) Order 1905 Provisional Order to enable the Rural District Council of Eton to put in force the Compulsory Clauses of the Lands Clauses Acts. | |
| | Eton Rural (Iver) Order 1905 Provisional Order to enable the Rural District Council of Eton to put in force the Compulsory Clauses of the Lands Clauses Acts. | |
| | Houghton-le-Spring and Hetton Joint Small-Pox Hospital Order 1905 Provisional Order for forming a United District under Section 279 of the Public Health Act 1875. | |
| | Rugby Joint Hospital Order 1905 Provisional Order for forming a United District under Section 279 of the Public Health Act 1875. | |
| Local Government Board's Provisional Orders Confirmation (No. 15) Act 1905 | 5 Edw. 7. c. lxxvi | 30 June 1905 |
An Act to confirm certain Provisional Orders of the Local Government Board relating to Cheltenham and Horsham (Rural).
| | Cheltenham Order 1905 Provisional Order for altering the Cheltenham Improvement Act 1852 (Note: Cheltenham Improvement Act 1852 (15 & 16 Vict. c. l)) the Cheltenham Corporation Water Act 1878 (Note: Cheltenham Corporation Water Act 1878 (41 & 42 Vict. c. cciii)) the Cheltenham Corporation Water Act 1881 (Note: Cheltenham Corporation Water Act 1881 (44 & 45 Vict. c. lxxiv)) the Cheltenham Improvement Act 1889 (Note: Cheltenham Improvement Act 1889 (52 & 53 Vict. c. clxxxiv)) and a Confirming Act. (Note: Local Government Board's Provisional Orders Confirmation (No. 13) Act 1898 (61 & 62 Vict. c. ccxii)) | |
| | Horsham Rural Order 1905 Provisional Order to enable the Rural District Council of Horsham to put in force the Compulsory Clauses of the Lands Clauses Acts. | |
| Local Government Board's Provisional Order Confirmation (Gas) Act 1905 | 5 Edw. 7. c. lxxvii | 30 June 1905 |
An Act to confirm a Provisional Order of the Local Government Board relating to Withnell.
| | Withnell Gas Order 1905 Provisional Order under the Gas and Water Works Facilities Act 1870. (Note: Gas and Water Works Facilities Act 1870 (33 & 34 Vict. c. 70)) | |
| Local Government Board's Provisional Orders Confirmation (Poor Law) Act 1905 | 5 Edw. 7. c. lxxviii | 30 June 1905 |
An Act to confirm certain Provisional Orders of the Local Government Board relating to the Parish of Hammersmith and the Poplar Union.
| | Parish of Hammersmith Order 1905 Provisional Order made in pursuance of sub-section (3) of Section 2 of the Poor Law Act 1889. (Note: Poor Law Act 1889 (52 & 53 Vict. c. 56)) | |
| | Poplar Union Order 1905 Provisional Order made in pursuance of sub-section (3) of Section 2 of the Poor Law Act 1889. | |
| Electric Lighting Orders Confirmation (No. 1) Act 1905 | 5 Edw. 7. c. lxxix | 30 June 1905 |
An Act to confirm certain Provisional Orders made by the Board of Trade under the Electric Lighting Acts 1882 (Note: Electric Lighting Act 1882 (45 & 46 Vict. c. 56)) and 1888 (Note: Electric Lighting Act 1888 (51 & 52 Vict. c. 12)) relating to Bury (Rural) Conway Golborne Haydock Hipperholme Little Lever Southall-Norwood Spalding Whitwood and Whitworth.
| | Bury Rural District Electric Lighting Order 1905 Provisional Order granted by the Board of Trade under the Electric Lighting Acts 1882 and 1888 to the Rural District Council of Bury in respect of the Rural District of Bury in the County Palatine of Lancaster. | |
| | Conway Corporation Electric Lighting Order 1905 Provisional Order granted by the Board of Trade under the Electric Lighting Acts 1882 and 1888 to the Mayor Aldermen and Burgesses of the Borough of Conway in respect of the Borough of Conway in the County of Carnarvon. | |
| | Golborne Electric Lighting Order 1905 Provisional Order granted by the Board of Trade under the Electric Lighting Acts 1882 and 1888 to the Urban District Council of Golborne in respect of the Urban District of Golborne in the County of Lancaster. | |
| | Haydock Electric Lighting Order 1905 Provisional Order grunted by the Board of Trade under the Electric Lighting Acts 1882 and 1888 to the Urban District Council of Haydock in respect of the Urban District of Haydock in the County of Lancaster. | |
| | Hipperholme Electric Lighting Order 1905 Provisional Order granted by the Board of Trade under the Electric Lighting Acts 1882 and 1888 to the Hipperholme Urban District Council in respect of the Urban District of Hipperholme in the West Riding of the County of York. | |
| | Little Lever Electric Lighting Order 1905 Provisional Order granted by the Board of Trade under the Electric Lighting Acts 1882 and 1888 to the Urban District Council of Little Lever in respect of the Urban District of Little Lever in the County Palatine of Lancaster. | |
| | Southhall-Norwood Electric Lighting Order 1905 Provisional Order granted by the Board of Trade under the Electric Lighting Acts 1882 and 1888 to the Southall-Norwood Urban District Council in respect of the Urban District of Southall-Norwood in the County of Middlesex. | |
| | Spalding Electric Lighting Order 1905 Provisional Order granted by the Board of Trade under the Electric Lighting Acts 1882 and 1888 to the Urban District Council of Spalding in respect of the Urban District of Spalding in the County of Lincoln. | |
| | Whitwood Electric Lighting Order 1905 Provisional Order granted by the Board of Trade under the Electric Lighting Acts 1882 and 1888 to the Urban District Council of Whitwood in respect of the Urban District of Whitwood in the West Riding of the County of York. | |
| | Whitworth Electric Lighting Order 1905 Provisional Order granted by the Board of Trade under the Electric Lighting Acts 1882 and 1888 to the Urban District Council of Whitworth in respect of the Urban District of Whitworth in the County of Lancaster. | |
| Electric Lighting Order Confirmation (No. 2) Act 1905 | 5 Edw. 7. c. lxxx | 30 June 1905 |
An Act to confirm a Provisional Order made by the Board of Trade under the Electric Lighting Acts 1882 and 1888 relating to Ballaghaderreen.
| | Ballaghaderreen Electric Lighting Order 1905 Provisional Order granted by the Board of Trade under the Electric Lighting Acts 1882 and 1888 to the Rural District Council of Castlerea in respect of the town of Ballaghaderreen and portions of the Townlands of Lung Friarshill Knockanaconny Ballaghaderreen and Kilcolman in the County Roscommon. | |
| Electric Lighting Order Confirmation (No. 3) Act 1905 | 5 Edw. 7. c. lxxxi | 30 June 1905 |
An Act to confirm a Provisional Order made by the Board of Trade under the Electric Lighting Acts 1882 and 1888 relating to Woolwich.
| | Woolwich Electric Lighting Order 1905 Provisional Order granted by the Bourd of Trade under the Electric Lighting Acts 1882 and 1888 to the Mayor Aldermen and Councillors of the Metropolitan Borough of Woolwich in respect of the Metropolitan Borough of Woolwich. | |
| Local Government Board (Ireland) Provisional Order Confirmation (No. 1) Act 1905 | 5 Edw. 7. c. lxxxii | 30 June 1905 |
An Act to confirm a Provisional Order of the Local Government Board for Ireland under the Local Government (Ireland) (No. 2) Act 1900. (Note: Local Government (Ireland) (No. 2) Act 1900 (63 & 64 Vict. c. 41))
| | Local Government (Procedure of Councils) Order 1905 Provisional Order for partially annulling and varying certain provisions of the Local Government (Procedure of Councils) Order 1899. (Note: Local Government (Procedure of Councils) Order 1899 (SR&O 1899/43)) | |
| Local Government Board (Ireland) Provisional Orders Confirmation (No. 3) Act 1905 | 5 Edw. 7. c. lxxxiii | 30 June 1905 |
An Act to confirm certain Provisional Orders of the Local Government Board for Ireland relating to the Baltracey River the River Lerr and the Blackwater Drainage Districts in the Counties of Carlow Kildare and Meath.
| | Baltracey Drainage Order 1905 Provisional Order to transfer the business of the Baltracey District Drainage Board to the County Council of Kildare. | |
| | River Lerr Drainage Order 1905 Provisional Order to transfer the business of the River Lerr Drainage Board to the County Councils of Carlow and Kildare. | |
| | Blackwater Drainage Order 1905 Provisional Order to transfer the business of the Trustees for the Blackwater Drainage District to the County Councils of Kildare and Meath. | |
| Municipal Corporation (Merthyr Tydfil Scheme Confirmation) Act 1905 | 5 Edw. 7. c. lxxxiv | 30 June 1905 |
An Act to confirm a Scheme made by a Committee of the Lords of His Majesty's Privy Council under the Municipal Corporation Acts 1882 (Note: Municipal Corporations Act 1882 (45 & 46 Vict. c. 50)) and 1885 (Note: School Boards Act 1885 (48 & 49 Vict. c. 38)) relating to Merthyr Tydfil.
| | Borough of Merthyr Tydfil Scheme 1905 Scheme under the Municipal Corporation Acts 1882 and 1885 settled by a Committee of the Lords of His Majesty's Privy Council for the adjustment of the property rights liabilities &c. of the Urban District Council of Merthyr Tydfil and for other purposes. | |
| Local Government Board's Provisional Orders Confirmation (No. 10) Act 1905 | 5 Edw. 7. c. lxxxv | 11 July 1905 |
An Act to confirm certain Provisional Orders of the Local Government Board relating to Abergavenny Atherton Keighley Richmond (Surrey) and Whiston (Rural).
| | Abergavenny Order 1905 Provisional Order for partially repealing and altering the Abergavenny Improvement Act 1854 (Note: Abergavenny Improvement Act 1854 (17 & 18 Vict. c. xlix)) the Abergavenny Improvement Act 1860 (Note: Abergavenny Improvement Act 1860 (23 & 24 Vict. c. cxxxvii)) and the Abergavenny Improvement Act 1871. (Note: Abergavenny Improvement Act 1871 (34 & 35 Vict. c. xcii)) | |
| | Atherton Order 1905 Provisional Order for altering the Atherton Local Board Act 1873. (Note: Atherton Local Board Act 1873 (36 & 37 Vict. c. xciv)) | |
| | Keighley Order 1905 Provisional Order for partially altering the Keighley Waterworks and Improvement Act 1872. (Note: Keighley Waterworks and Improvement Act 1872 (35 & 36 Vict. c. cviii)) | |
| | Richmond (Surrey) Order 1905 Provisional Order to enable the Urban District Council for the Borough of Richmond (Surrey) to put in force the Compulsory Clauses of the Lands Clauses Acts. | |
| | Whiston Rural Order 1905 Provisional Order to enable the Rural District Council of Whiston to put in force the Compulsory Clauses of the Lands Clauses Acts. | |
| Local Government Board's Provisional Orders Confirmation (No. 13) Act 1905 | 5 Edw. 7. c. lxxxvi | 11 July 1905 |
An Act to confirm certain Provisional Orders of the Local Government Board relating to Briton Ferry Clifton Dartmouth Hardness Horsforth and Teignmouth.
| | Briton Ferry Order 1905 Provisional Order for altering the Briton Ferry Local Board Act 1873. (Note: Briton Ferry Local Board Act 1873 (36 & 37 Vict. c. cxxii)) | |
| | Dartmouth Order 1905 Provisional Order for partially repealing and altering a Local Act of the 55th year of King George III. Chapter XXVIIІ. (Note: Clifton Dartmouth Hardness Market and Improvement Act 1815 (55 Geo. 3. c. xxviii)) | |
| | Horsforth Order 1905 Provisional Order for altering the Horsforth Urban District Council Waterworks Act 1899. (Note: Horsforth Urban District Council Waterworks Act 1899 (62 & 63 Vict. c. xix)) | |
| | Teignmouth Order 1905 Provisional Order for partially repealing and altering a Local Act of the sixth year of King William the Fourth Chapter lix. (Note: Teignmouth Improvement Act 1836 (6 & 7 Will. 4. c. lix)) and a Confirming Act. (Note: Local Government Board's Provisional Orders Confirmation (No. 6) Act 1900 (63 & 64 Vict. c. clxxvi)) | |
| Local Government Board (Ireland) Provisional Orders Confirmation (No. 4) Act 1905 | 5 Edw. 7. c. lxxxvii | 11 July 1905 |
An Act to confirm certain Provisional Orders of the Local Government Board for Ireland relating to Kilrush (Rural) Londonderry and New Ross.
| | Kilkee Waterworks Order 1905 Provisional Order to enable the Council of the Rural District of Kilrush to put in force the Compulsory Clauses of the Lands Clauses Acts. | |
| | Londonderry Order 1905 Provisional Order to enable the Corporation of Londonderry to put in force the Compulsory Clauses of the Lands Clauses Acts. | |
| | New Ross Order 1905 Provisional Order to enable the Council of the Urban District of New Ross to put in force the Compulsory Clauses of the Lands Clauses Acts. | |
| Electric Lighting Orders Confirmation (No. 7) Act 1905 | 5 Edw. 7. c. lxxxviii | 11 July 1905 |
An Act to confirm certain Provisional Orders made by the Board of Trade under the Electric Lighting Acts 1882 and 1888 relating to Bishop's Stortford Dover (Extension) Hemsworth and District Marlborough Tottington and Woking (Chertsey Extension).
| | Bishop's Stortford Electric Lighting Order 1905 Provisional Order granted by the Board of Trade under the Electric Lighting Acts 1882 and 1888 to the Urban District Council of Bishop's Stortford in respect of the Urban District of Bishop's Stortford in the County of Hertford. | |
| | Dover Electric Lighting (Extension) Order 1905 Provisional Order granted by the Board of Trade under the Electric Lighting Acts 1882 and 1888 to the Mayor Aldermen and Burgesses of the Borough of Dover in respect of the Parishes of River Ewell Whitfield St. Margarets-at-Cliffe West Cliffe and Guston and part of the Parish of Alkham all in the Rural District of Dover in the County of Kent. | |
| | Hemsworth and District Electric Lighting Order 1905 Provisional Order granted by the Board of Trade under the Electric Lighting Acts 1882 and 1888 to the Hemsworth Electricity Supply Company Limited in respect of part of the Rural District of Hemsworth in the West Riding of the County of York. | |
| | Marlborough Electric Lighting Order 1905 Provisional Order granted by the Board of Trade under the Electric Lighting Acts 1882 and 1888 to the Marlborough Electric Supply Company Limited in respect of the Borough of Marlborough in the County of Wilts. | |
| | Tottington Electric Lighting Order 1905 Provisional Order granted by the Board of Trade under the Electric Lighting Acts 1882 and 1888 to the Lancashire Electric Power Company in respect of the Urban District of Tottington in the County of Lancaster. | |
| | Woking Electric Supply Company Electric Lighting (Chertsey Extension) Order 1905 Provisional Order granted by the Board of Trade under the Electric Lighting Acts 1882 and 1888 to the Woking Electric Supply Company Limited in respect of the extension of their area of supply to a part of the Urban District of Chertsey and to the Parishes of Bisley Byfleet and Pyrford in the Rural District of Chertsey all in the County of Surrey. | |
| Highland Railway Act 1905 | 5 Edw. 7. c. lxxxix | 11 July 1905 |
An Act to extend the time for the completion of certain Railways authorised by the Highland Railway (Additional Powers) Act 1897 (Note: Highland Railway (Additional Powers) Act 1897 (60 & 61 Vict. c. ccxvi)) and for other purposes.
| Great Northern Railway Act 1905 | 5 Edw. 7. c. xc | 11 July 1905 |
An Act to make provision with reference to the construction of a Bridge over the River Witham at Langrick Ferry in the County of Lincoln to confer powers on the Great Northern Railway Company with reference to certain Footpaths and the Purchase of Lands to confirm the purchase of certain Lands by the Great Northern and Great Eastern Joint Committee to extend the time limited for the completion of certain Works and the purchase of certain Lands by the Company to authorise the abandonment of certain authorised Railways at Grantham to empower the Horncastle Railway Company to raise further moneys by borrowing and for other purposes.
| University College London (Transfer) Act 1905 | 5 Edw. 7. c. xci | 11 July 1905 |
An Act for transferring University College London to the University of London and for other matters connected therewith and for amending the University of London Act 1898. (Note: University of London Act 1898 (61 & 62 Vict. c. 62))
| Weaver Navigation Act 1905 | 5 Edw. 7. c. xcii | 11 July 1905 |
An Act to enable the Weaver Navigation Trustees to improve their lift at Anderton and to raise further moneys and to confer further powers upon the Cheshire County Council with reference to such moneys and for other purposes.
| Seaham Gas Act 1905 | 5 Edw. 7. c. xciii | 11 July 1905 |
An Act for incorporating and conferring powers on the Seaham Gas and Lighting Company.
| Swansea Corporation Water Act 1905 (repealed) | 5 Edw. 7. c. xciv | 11 July 1905 |
An Act to confer further powers upon the Mayor Aldermen and Burgesses of the borough of Swansea in regard to their water undertaking and for other purposes. (Repealed by West Glamorgan Water Board Order 1966 (SI 1966/1096))
| South Eastern and London, Chatham and Dover Railways Act 1905 | 5 Edw. 7. c. xcv | 11 July 1905 |
An Act to confer further powers on the South Eastern and London Chatham and Dover Railway Companies and the South Eastern and Chatham Railway Companies Managing Committee for the making of new works and the acquisition of additional lands the purchase of the Sheppey Light Railway and for other purposes.
| Hythe Corporation Act 1905 | 5 Edw. 7. c. xcvi | 11 July 1905 |
An Act to empower the Corporation of Hythe to construct additional Waterworks to make further provision for the improvement of the Borough and for other purposes.
| Stepney Borough Council (Superannuation) Act 1905 | 5 Edw. 7. c. xcvii | 11 July 1905 |
An Act to provide for the granting of Superannuation Allowances to the Officers and Servants of the Council of the Metropolitan Borough of Stepney and for other purposes.
| Great Western Railway (New Railways) Act 1905 | 5 Edw. 7. c. xcviii | 11 July 1905 |
An Act for empowering the Great Western Railway Company to construct new railways and for other purposes.
| Hastings Tramways Act 1905 (repealed) | 5 Edw. 7. c. xcix | 11 July 1905 |
An Act to extend the time limited for the completion of the tramways light railways and works authorised to be constructed by the Hastings Tramways Company and to revive the powers for the compulsory purchase of land by that Company and to authorise the construction of certain deviations of their authorised light railways and other works and for other purposes. (Repealed by Hastings Tramways Act 1957 (5 & 6 Eliz. 2. c. xxxvi))
| Clyde Navigation (Constitution) Act 1905 (repealed) | 5 Edw. 7. c. c | 11 July 1905 |
An Act to amend the Constitution of the Trustees of the Clyde Navigation and for other purposes. (Repealed by Clyde Port Authority Order Confirmation Act 1965 (c. xlv))
| Mansfield Corporation Act 1905 | 5 Edw. 7. c. ci | 11 July 1905 |
An Act to confer further powers upon the Mayor Aldermen and Burgesses of the Borough of Mansfield with respect to their Water Undertaking to make further and better provision in regard to the health local government and improvement of the Borough and for other purposes.
| Education Board Provisional Orders Confirmation (Liverpool, &c.) Act 1905 | 5 Edw. 7. c. cii | 4 August 1905 |
An Act to confirm certain Provisional Orders made by the Board of Education under the Education Acts 1870 to 1903 to enable the Councils of the County Boroughs of Liverpool and Manchester the County of Surrey and the Urban District of Willesden to put in force the Lands Clauses Acts.
| | Liverpool County Borough Council Order 1905 Provisional Order for putting in force the Lands Clauses Acts. | |
| | Manchester County Borough Council Order 1905 Provisional Order for putting in force the Lands Clauses Acts. | |
| | Surrey County Council Order 1905 Provisional Order for putting in force the Lands Clauses Acts. | |
| | Willesden Urban District Council Order 1905 Provisional Order for putting in force the Lands Clauses Acts. | |
| Education Board Provisional Order Confirmation (London No. 1) Act 1905 | 5 Edw. 7. c. ciii | 4 August 1905 |
An Act to confirm a Provisional Order made by the Board of Education under the Education Acts 1870 to 1903 to enable the London County Council to put in force the Lands Clauses Acts.
| | London County Council (No. 1) Order 1905 Provisional Order for putting in force the Lands Clauses Acts. | |
| Education Board Provisional Order Confirmation (London No. 2) Act 1905 | 5 Edw. 7. c. civ | 4 August 1905 |
An Act to confirm a Provisional Order made by the Board of Education under the Education Acts 1870 to 1903 to enable the London County Council to put in force the Lands Clauses Acts.
| | London County Council (No. 2) Order 1905 Provisional Order for putting in force the Lands Clauses Acts. | |
| Millport Piers and Burgh Extension Order Confirmation Act 1905 | 5 Edw. 7. c. cv | 4 August 1905 |
An Act to confirm a Provisional Order under the Private Legislation Procedure (Scotland) Act 1899 relating to Millport Piers and Burgh Extension.
| | Millport Piers and Burgh Extension Order 1905 Provisional Order to authorise the Town Council of Millport in the County of Bute to acquire and maintain the Pier and Harbour of Millport and Keppel Pier to construct Works and acquire Lands for extending the boundaries of the Burgh of Millport and other purposes. | |
| Local Government Board's Provisional Orders Confirmation (No. 8) Act 1905 | 5 Edw. 7. c. cvi | 4 August 1905 |
An Act to confirm certain Provisional Orders of the Local Government Board relating to Haverfordwest Leicester Scarborough and Wallasey.
| | Haverfordwest Order 1905 Provisional Order for partially repealing and altering the Haverfordwest Borough Act 1868. (Note: Haverfordwest Borough Act 1868 (31 & 32 Vict. c. xxxiv)) | |
| | Leicester Order 1905 Provisional Order for altering the Leicester Cattle Market Town Hall and Improvement Act 1866 (Note: Leicester Cattle Market Town Hall and Improvement Act 1866 (29 & 30 Vict. c. xxvi)) the Leicester Improvement Act 1876 (Note: Leicester Improvement Act 1876 (39 & 40 Vict. c. xxvi)) and the Leicester Corporation Act 1902. (Note: Leicester Corporation Act 1902 (2 Edw. 7. c. clxxvii)) | |
| | Scarborough Order 1905 Provisional Order for altering the Scarborough Improvement Act 1889. (Note: Scarborough Improvement Act 1889 (52 & 53 Vict. c. clxiv)) | |
| | Wallasey Order 1905 Provisional Order for the alteration of the Wallasey Improvement Act 1858 (Note: Wallasey Improvement Act 1858 (21 & 22 Vict. c. lxiii)) the Wallasey Improvement Act 1861 (Note: Wallasey Improvement Act 1861 (24 & 25 Vict. c. iv)) the Wallasey Improvement Act 1864 (Note: Wallasey Improvement Act 1864 (27 & 28 Vict. c. cxvii)) the Wallasey Improvement Act 1867 (Note: Wallasey Improvement Act 1867 (30 & 31 Vict. c.cxxxii)) and the Wallasey Improvement Act 1872 (Note: Wallasey Improvement Act 1872 (35 & 36 Vict. c. cxxv)) and certain Confirming Acts. | |
| Local Government Board's Provisional Orders Confirmation (No. 11) Act 1905 | 5 Edw. 7. c. cvii | 4 August 1905 |
An Act to confirm certain Provisional Orders of the Local Government Board relating to Durham and Framwelgate Hanley and Southport.
| | Durham (Extension) Order 1905 Provisional Order made in pursuance of Sections 54 and 59 of the Local Government Act 1888. | |
| | Hanley (Extension) Order 1905 Provisional Order made in pursuance of Sections 54 and 59 of the Local Government Act 1888. | |
| | County Borough of Southport Order 1905 Provisional Order made in pursuance of Sections 54 and 59 of the Local Government Act 1888. | |
| Local Government Board's Provisional Orders Confirmation (No. 12) Act 1905 | 5 Edw. 7. c. cviii | 4 August 1905 |
An Act to confirm certain Provisional Orders of the Local Government Board relating to Liverpool and Poole.
| | Liverpool (Extension) Order 1905 Provisional Order made in pursuance of Sections 54 and 59 of the Local Government Act 1888. | |
| | Poole (Extension) Order 1905 Provisional Order made in pursuance of Sections 54 and 59 of the Local Government Act 1888. | |
| Local Government Board's Provisional Orders Confirmation (No. 14) Act 1905 | 5 Edw. 7. c. cix | 4 August 1905 |
An Act to confirm certain Provisional Orders of the Local Government Board relating to Acton Bradford (Yorkshire) the Fylde Water Board and the Fylde Preston and Garstang and the Middlesex Districts Joint Hospital Districts.
| | Acton Order 1905 Provisional Order to enable the Urban District Council of Acton to put in force the Compulsory Clauses of the Lands Clauses Acts. | |
| | Bradford (Yorkshire) Order 1905 Provisional Order to enable the Urban Sanitary Authority for the City of Bradford (Yorks) to put in force the Compulsory Clauses of the Lands Clauses Acts. | |
| | Fylde Order 1905 Provisional Order for altering the Fylde Water Board Act 1899. (Note: Fylde Water Board Act 1899 (62 & 63 Vict. c. ccxliii)) | |
| | Fylde, Preston and Garstang Joint Small-Pox Hospital Order 1905 Provisional Order for forming a United District under Section 279 and of the Public Health Act 1875. | |
| | Middlesex Districts Joint Small-Pox Hospital Order 1905 Provisional Order for forming a United District under Section 279 of the Public Health Act 1875. | |
| Local Government Board's Provisional Order Confirmation (No. 16) Act 1905 (repealed) | 5 Edw. 7. c. cx | 4 August 1905 |
An Act to confirm a Provisional Order of the Local Government Board relating to Sheffield. (Repealed by Sheffield Corporation (Consolidation) Act 1918 (8 & 9 Geo. 5. c. lxi))
| | Sheffield Order (No. 2) 1905 Provisional Order for altering the Sheffield Corporation Act 1883 (Note: Sheffield Corporation Act 1883 (46 & 47 Vict. c. lvii)) the Sheffield Corporation Act 1889 (Note: Sheffield Corporation Act 1889 (52 & 53 Vict. c. iii)) the Sheffield Corporation Act 1890 (Note: Sheffield Corporation Act 1890 (53 & 54 Vict. c. ccxxv)) the Sheffield Corporation Water Act 1896 (Note: Sheffield Corporation Water Act 1896 (59 & 60 Vict. c. cxc)) the Sheffield Electric Lighting (Transfer) Act 1898 (Note: Sheffield Electric Lighting (Transfer) Act 1898 (61 & 62 Vict. c. ccxx)) the Sheffield Corporation (Markets) Act 1899 (Note: Sheffield Corporation (Markets) Act 1899 (62 & 63 Vict. c. ccxi)) the Sheffield Corporation Act 1900 (Note: Sheffield Corporation Act 1900 (63 & 64 Vict. c. ccxxii)) the Sheffield Corporation Act 1901 (Note: Sheffield Corporation Act 1901 (1 Edw. 7. c. cviii)) and the Sheffield Corporation Act 1903. (Note: Sheffield Corporation Act 1903 (3 Edw. 7. c. cclv)) | |
| Local Government Board's Provisional Orders Confirmation (No. 17) Act 1905 | 5 Edw. 7. c. cxi | 4 August 1905 |
An Act to confirm certain Provisional Orders of the Local Government Board relating to Milton-next-Sittingbourne Sittingbourne and Milton (Rural) and the Enfield and Edmonton Joint Hospital District.
| | Milton and Sittingbourne (Medical Officer of Health) Order 1905 Provisional Order for Union of Districts under Section 286 of the Public Health Act 1875. | |
| | Enfield and Edmonton Joint Hospital Order 1905 Provisional Order for forming a United District under Section 279 of the Public Health Act 1875. | |
| Electric Lighting Orders Confirmation (No. 4) Act 1905 (repealed) | 5 Edw. 7. c. cxii | 4 August 1905 |
An Act to confirm certain Provisional Orders made by the Board of Trade under the Electric Lighting Acts 1882 and 1888 the Electric Lighting (Scotland) Act 1890 (Note: Electric Lighting (Scotland) Act 1890 (53 & 54 Vict. c. 13)) and the Electric Lighting (Scotland) Act 1902 (Note: Electric Lighting (Scotland) Act 1902 (2 Edw. 7. c. 35)) relating to Denny and Dunipace Grangemouth Inverness Pollokshaws Renfrew Rutherglen and Uphall. (Repealed by North of Scotland Electricity Order Confirmation Act 1958 (7 & 8 Eliz. 2. c. ii))
| | Denny and Dunipace Electric Lighting Order 1905 Provisional Order granted by the Board of Trade under the Electric Lighting Acts 1882 and 1888 the Electric Lighting (Scotland) Act 1890 and the Electric Lighting (Scotland) Act 1902 to the Provost Magistrates and Councillors of the Burgh of Denny and Dunipace in respect of the Burgh of Denny and Dunipace in the County of Sterling. | |
| | Grangemouth Electric Lighting Order 1905 Provisional Order granted by the Board of Trade under the Electric Lighting Acts 1882 and 1888 the Electric Lighting (Scotland) Act 1890 and the Electric Lighting (Scotland) Act 1902 to the Provost Magistrates and Councillors of the Burgh of Grangemouth in respect of the Burgh of Grangemouth in the County of Sterling. | |
| | Inverness Electric Lighting Order 1905 Provisional Order granted by the Board of Trade under the Electric Lighting Acts 1882 and 1888 the Electric Lighting (Scotland) Act 1890 and the Electric Lighting (Scotland) Act 1902 to the North of Scotland Electric Light and Power Company Limited in respect of the Royal Burgh of Inverness. | |
| | Burgh of Pollokshaws Electric Lighting Order 1905 Provisional Order granted by the Board of Trade under the Electric Lighting Acts 1882 and 1888 the Electric Lighting (Scotland) Act 1890 and the Electric Lighting (Scotland) Act 1902 to the Provost Magistrates and Councillors of the Burgh of Pollokshaws in respect of the Burgh of Pollokshaws in the County of Renfrew. | |
| | Renfrew Burgh Electric Lighting Order 1905 Provisional Order granted by the Board of Trade under the Electric Lighting Acts 1882 and 1888 the Electric Lighting (Scotland) Act 1890 and the Electric Lighting (Scotland) Act 1902 to the Provost Magistrates and Councillors of the Royal Burgh of Renfrew in the County of Renfrew in respect of that Burgh. | |
| | Rutherglen Electric Lighting Order 1905 Provisional Order granted by the Board of Trade under the Electric Lighting Acts 1882 and 1888 the Electric Lighting (Scotland) Act 1890 and the Electric Lighting (Scotland) Act 1902 to the Provost Magistrates and Councillors of the Royal Burgh of Rutherglen in respect of the Police Area of the Royal Burgh of Rutherglen in the County of Lanark. | |
| | Uphall Electric Lighting Order 1905 Provisional Order granted by the Board of Trade under the Electric Lighting Acts 1882 and 1888 the Electric Lighting (Scotland) Act 1890 and the Electric Lighting (Scotland) Act 1902 to the County Council of the County of Linlighgow in respect of the Uphall Special Lighting District in the Parish of Uphall in the County of Linlithgow. | |
| Electric Lighting Orders Confirmation (No. 5) Act 1905 | 5 Edw. 7. c. cxiii | 4 August 1905 |
An Act to confirm certain Provisional Orders made by the Board of Trade under the Electric Lighting Acts 1882 and 1888 relating to Andover Burslem (Extension to Tunstall) Hessle Litherland Little Hulton Penmaenmawr Ravensthorpe Stratford-upon-Avon Surbiton and Tewkesbury.
| | Andover Electric Lighting Order 1905 Provisional Order granted by the Board of Trade under the Electric Lighting Acts 1882 and 1888 to the Mayor Aldermen and Burgesses of the Borough of Andover in respect of the Borough of Andover in the County of Southampton. | |
| | Burslem Electric Lighting (Extension to Tunstall) Order 1905 Provisional Order granted by the Board of Trade under the Electric Lighting Acts 1882 and 1888 to the Mayor Aldermen and Burgesses of the Borough of Burslem in respect of the Urban District of Tunstall in the County of Stafford. | |
| | Hessle Electric Lighting Order 1905 Provisional Order granted by the Board of Trade under the Electric Lighting Acts 1882 and 1888 to the Urban District Council of Hessle in respect of the Urban District of Hessle in the East Riding of the County of York. | |
| | Litherland Electric Lighting Order 1905 Provisional Order granted by the Board of Trade under the Electric Lighting Acts 1882 and 1888 to the Urban District Council of Litherland in respect of the Urban District of Litherland in the County of Lancaster. | |
| | Little Hulton Electric Lighting Order 1905 Provisional Order granted by the Board of Trade under the Electric Lighting Acts 1882 and 1888 to the Urban District Council of Little Hulton in respect of the Urban District of Little Hulton in the County of Lancaster. | |
| | Penmaenmawr Electric Lighting Order 1905 Provisional Order granted by the Board of Trade under the Electric Lighting Acts 1882 and 1888 to the Urban District Council of Penmaenmaror in respect of the Urban District of Penmaenmawr in the County of Carnarvon. | |
| | Ravensthorpe Electric Lighting Order 1905 Provisional Order granted by the Board of Trade under the Electric Lighting Acts 1882 and 1888 to the Urban District Council of Ravensthorpe in respect of the Urban District of Ravensthorpe in the West Riding of the County of York. | |
| | Stratford-upon-Avon Electric Lighting Order 1901 (Amendment) Order 1905 Provisional Order granted by the Board of Trade under the Electric Lighting Acts 1882 and 1888 to the Mayor Aldermen and Burgesses of the Borough of Stratford-upon-Avon for the amendment of the Stratford-upon-Avon Electric Lighting Order 1901. | |
| | Surbiton Electric Lighting Order 1905 Provisional Order granted by the Board of Trade under the Electric Lighting Acts 1882 and 1888 to the Urban District Council of Surbiton for the extension of their Area of Supply to a part of the Urban District of Surbiton. | |
| | Tewkesbury Electric Lighting Order 1905 Provisional Order granted by the Board of Trade under the Electric Lighting Acts 1882 and 1888 to the Mayor Aldermen and Burgesses of the Borough of Tewkesbury in respect of the Borough of Tewkesbury in the County of Gloucester. | |
| Electric Lighting Orders Confirmation (No. 6) Act 1905 | 5 Edw. 7. c. cxiv | 4 August 1905 |
An Act to confirm certain Provisional Orders made by the Board of Trade under the Electric Lighting Acts 1882 and 1888 relating to Barnet Brockenhurst Farnham Gosport and Alverstoke Houghton-le-Spring and District (Amendment) Lichfield Ludlow Lytham St. Albans (Rural) and Ware.
| | Barnet Electric Lighting Order 1905 Provisional Order granted by the Board of Trade under the Electric Lighting Acts 1882 and 1888 to the North Metropolitan Electrical Power Distribution Company Limited in respect of the Urban District of Barnet in the County of Hertford. | |
| | Brockenhurst Electric Lighting Order 1905 Provisional Order granted by the Board of Trade under the Brookenhurst Electric Lighting Acts 1882 and 1888 to Messrs. Christy Brothers and Middleton in respect of part of the Parish of Brockenhurst in the Rural District of Lymington in the County of Southampton. | |
| | Farnham Electric Lighting Order 1905 Provisional Order granted by the Board of Trade under the Electric Lighting Acts 1882 and 1888 to the Farnham and District Electric Supply Company Limited in respect of the Urban District of Farnham in the County of Surrey. | |
| | Gosport Electric Lighting Order 1905 Provisional Order granted by the Board of Trade under the Electric Lighting Acts 1882 and 1888 to the Gosport and Alverstoke Electric Lighting Company Limited in respect of the Urban District of Gosport and Alverstoke in the County of Southampton. | |
| | Houghton-le-Spring and District Electric Lighting Order 1904 Amendment Order 1905 Provisional Order granted by the Board of Trade under the Electric Lighting Acts 1882 and 1888 amending the Houghton-le-Spring and District Electric Lighting Order 1904. | |
| | Lichfield Electric Lighting Order 1905 Provisional Order granted by the Board of Trade under the Electric Lighting Acts 1882 and 1888 to Foote and Milne Limited in respect of the City of Lichfield in the County of Stafford. | |
| | Ludlow Electric Lighting Order 1905 Provisional Order granted by the Board of Trade under the Electric Lighting Acts 1882 and 1888 to William Norton in respect of the Borough of Ludlow in the County of Salop. | |
| | Lytham Electric Lighting Order 1905 Provisional Order granted by the Board of Trade under the Electric Lighting Acts 1882 and 1888 to Foote and Milne Limited in respect of the Urban District of Lytham in the County of Lancaster. | |
| | St. Alban's Rural Electric Lighting Order 1905 Provisional Order granted by the Board of Trade under the Electric Lighting Acts 1882 and 1888 to the St. Albans and District Electric Supply Company Limited in respect of the Parishes of St. Michael Rural St. Stephen St. Peter Rural and Sandridge Rural in the Rural District of St. Albans in the County of Hertford. | |
| | Ware Electric Lighting Order 1905 Provisional Order granted by the Board of Trade under the Electric Lighting Acts 1882 and 1888 to the North Metropolitan Electrical Power Distribution Company Limited in respect of the Urban District of Ware in the County of Hertford. | |
| Electric Lighting Orders Confirmation (No. 8) Act 1905 (repealed) | 5 Edw. 7. c. cxv | 4 August 1905 |
An Act to confirm certain Provisional Orders made by the Board of Trade under the Electric Lighting Acts 1882 and 1888 the Electric Lighting (Scotland) Act 1890 and the Electric Lighting (Scotland) Act 1902 relating to Airdrie Coatbridge and Cults and District. (Repealed by North of Scotland Electricity Order Confirmation Act 1958 (7 & 8 Eliz. 2. c. ii))
| | Airdrie Burgh Electric Lighting Order 1905 Provisional Order granted by the Board of Trade under the Electric Lighting Acts 1882 and 1888 the Electric Lighting (Scotland) Act 1890 and the Electric Lighting (Scotland) Act 1902 to the Scottish House-to-House Electricity Company Limited in respect of the Burgh of Airdrie in the County of Lanark. | |
| | Coatbridge Electric Lighting Order 1905 Provisional Order granted by the Board of Trade under the Electric Lighting Acts 1882 and 1888 the Electric Lighting (Scotland) Act 1890 and the Electric Lighting (Scotland) Act 1902 to the Scottish House-to-House Electricity Company Limited in respect of the Burgh of Coatbridge in the County of Lanark. | |
| | Cults and District Electric Lighting Order 1905 Provisional Order granted by the Board of Trade under the Electric Lighting Acts 1882 and 1888 the Electric Lighting (Scotland) Act 1890 and the Electric Lighting (Scotland) Act 1902 to Edward Joseph Bonner Lowdon and Kenneth Lowdon in respect of a portion of the Parish of Peterculter in the County of Aberdeen. | |
| Gas and Water Orders Confirmation (No. 1) Act 1905 | 5 Edw. 7. c. cxvi | 4 August 1905 |
An Act to confirm certain Provisional Orders made by the Board of Trade under the Gas and Water Works Facilities Act 1870 relating to Bolsover Gas Denbigh Water Formby Gas Hayling Water and Staveley Gas.
| | Bolsover Gas Order 1905 Order empowering the Bolsover Gaslight and Coke Company Limited to raise additional capital and for other purposes. | |
| | Denbigh Waterworks Order 1905 Order enabling the Denbigh Waterworks Company to raise additional capital and for other purposes. | |
| | Formby Gas Order 1905 Order empowering the Formby Gas Company Limited to raise additional capital for the purposes of their undertaking and for other purposes. | |
| | Hayling Water Order 1905 Order empowering the South Hayling Water Company Limited to raise additional capital and for other purposes. | |
| | Staveley Gas Order 1905 Order empowering the Staveley Gas Light and Coke Company Limited to maintain and continue Gasworks and to manufacture and supply Gas in the parish of Staveley in the county of Derby and for other purposes. | |
| Gas and Water Orders Confirmation (No. 2) Act 1905 | 5 Edw. 7. c. cxvii | 4 August 1905 |
An Act to confirm certain Provisional Orders made by the Board of Trade under the Gas and Water Works Facilities Act 1870 relating to Dorking Water Maidenhead Water Tavistock Gas Wey Valley Water and Ystalyfera Gas.
| | Dorking Water Order 1905 Order empowering the Dorking Water Company to extend their limits of Supply. | |
| | Maidenhead Water Order 1905 Order empowering the Maidenhead Waterworks Company to extend their limits of supply and to raise additional capital. | |
| | Tavistock Gas Order 1905 Order empowering the Tavistock Lighting Coal and Coke Company Limited to maintain and continue their existing Gasworks and to erect and maintain new Gasworks and to make store and supply Gas within the Urban District and Parish of Tavistock and within the Parish of Whitchurch both in the County of Devon and for other purposes. | |
| | Wey Valley Water Order 1905 Order empowering the Wey Valley Water Company to extend their Limits of Supply and raise Additional Capital and for other purposes. | |
| | Ystalyfera Gas Order 1905 Order authorising the maintenance and continuance of Gasworks and the manufacture and supply of Gas within parts of the Parishes of Llanguicke and Cilybebyll otherwise Killybebill both in the County of Glamorgan and parts of the Parish of Ystradgynlais Lower in the County of Brecknock. | |
| Inverness Gas and Water Order Confirmation Act 1905 | 5 Edw. 7. c. cxviii | 4 August 1905 |
An Act to confirm a Provisional Order under the Burgh Police (Scotland) Act 1892 (Note: Burgh Police (Scotland) Act 1892 (55 & 56 Vict. c. 55)) relating to the Burgh of Inverness.
| | Inverness Gas and Water Order 1905 Provisional Order to confer additional borrowing powers for the supply of Gas and Water upon the Town Council of Inverness and for other purposes. | |
| Port Glasgow Improvement Order Confirmation Act 1905 | 5 Edw. 7. c. cxix | 4 August 1905 |
An Act to confirm a Provisional Order under the Housing of the Working Classes Act 1890 (Note: Housing of the Working Classes Act 1890 (53 & 54 Vict. c. 70)) relating to the Burgh of Port Glasgow.
| | Port Glasgow Improvement Order 1905 Provisional Order for confirming an Improvement Scheme under Part I. of the Housing of the Working Classes Act 1890 relating to the Burgh of Port Glasgow. | |
| Gas Orders Confirmation Act 1905 | 5 Edw. 7. c. cxx | 4 August 1905 |
An Act to confirm certain Provisional Orders made by the Board of Trade under the Gas and Water Works Facilities Act 1870 relating to Aberystwyth Gas Haslemere Gas Hayling Island Gas Sandiacre Gas and Stanford-le-Hope Gas.
| | Aberystwyth Gas Order 1905 Order empowering the Aberystwyth Gas Company to raise additional capital and for other purposes. | |
| | Haslemere Gas Order 1905 Order empowering the Haslemere Gas Company Limited to maintain and continue gasworks and to manufacture and supply gas in certain parts of the counties of Surrey Southampton and West Sussex and for other purposes. | |
| | Hayling Island Gas Order 1905 Order empowering the Hayling Island Gas Company Limited to maintain and continue gasworks and to manufacture and supply gas in the parishes of South Hayling and North Hayling in the County of Southampton. | |
| | Sandiacre Gas Order 1905 Order authorising the maintenance and continuance of existing gasworks the construction of additional gasworks and the supply of gas in the Parish of Sandiacre in the County of Derby and for other purposes. | |
| | Stanford-le-Hope Gas Order 1905 Order empowering the Stanford-le-Hope Gas Company Limited to construct and maintain gasworks and to supply gas in the Parishes of Mucking Orsett Horndon-on-the-Hill Stanford-le-Hope Corringham Fobbing and Langdon Hills in the County of Essex and for other purposes. | |
| Pier and Harbour Orders Confirmation (No. 2) Act 1905 | 5 Edw. 7. c. cxxi | 4 August 1905 |
An Act to confirm certain Provisional Orders made by the Board of Trade under the General Pier and Harbour Act 1861 (Note: General Pier and Harbour Act 1861 (24 & 25 Vict. c. 45)) relating to Melfort and Portencross.
| | Melfort Pier Order 1905 Provisional Order authorising the levying of rates at and the regulation of the pier known as Melfort Pier situate in Fearnach Bay Loch Melfort in the County of Argyll and for other purposes connected therewith. | |
| | Portencross Pier and Harbour Order 1905 Provisional Order for the construction and maintenance of the new Pier and the widening and extension of the existing Harbours at Portencross in the Parish of West Kilbride in the County of Ayr constituting the Harbour Authority the levying of rates the maintenance and regulation of the Harbour and for other purposes. | |
| Pier and Harbour Order Confirmation (No. 3) Act 1905 (repealed) | 5 Edw. 7. c. cxxii | 4 August 1905 |
An Act to confirm a Provisional Order made by the Board of Trade under the General Pier and Harbour Act 1861 relating to Aberystwyth. (Repealed by Aberystwyth Harbour Act 1987 (c. xiv))
| | Aberystwyth Harbour Order 1905 Provisional Order authorising the Mayor Aldermen and Burgesses of the Borough of Aberystwyth to levy rates at their existing harbour in accordance with a new schedule to borrow money for the purposes of works and to charge certain funds under their control for securing the repayment of such money with interest and for other purposes. | |
| Local Government Board (Ireland) Provisional Orders Confirmation (No. 2) Act 1905 | 5 Edw. 7. c. cxxiii | 4 August 1905 |
An Act to confirm certain Provisional Orders of the Local Government Board for Ireland relating to Belfast the Belfast Holywood and Castlereagh United District Cork (Rural) Downpatrick (Rural) Newtownards and North Dublin (Rural).
| | Belfast Order 1905 Provisional Order for altering a Local Act. (Note: Belfast Corporation Act 1902 (2 Edw. 7. c. cix)) | |
| | Belfast, Holywood and Castlereagh Joint Board Order 1905 Belfast Holywood and Castlereagh United District. | |
| | Garrycloyne Burial Ground Order 1905 Provisional Order to enable the Council of the Rural District of Cork to put in force the Compulsory Clauses of the Lands Clauses Acts. | |
| | Castlewellan Waterworks Order 1905 Provisional Order to enable the Council of the Rural District of Downpatrick to put in force the Compulsory Clauses of the Lands Clauses Acts. | |
| | Newtownards Order 1905 Provisional Order to enable the Council of the Urban District of Newtownards to put in force the Compulsory Clauses of the Lands Clauses Acts. | |
| | Howth Sewerage Order 1905 Provisional Order to enable the Council of the Rural District of North Dublin to put in force the Compulsory Clauses of the Lands Clauses Acts. | |
| Edinburgh Corporation Order Confirmation Act 1905 (repealed) | 5 Edw. 7. c. cxxiv | 4 August 1905 |
An Act to confirm a Provisional Order under the Private Legislation Procedure (Scotland) Act 1899 relating to Edinburgh Corporation. (Repealed by Edinburgh Corporation Order Confirmation Act 1932 (22 & 23 Geo. 5. c. vii))
| | Edinburgh Corporation Order 1905 Provisional Order to repeal the limitation and restriction of the rate of speed on the Tramways of the Corporation of Edinburgh and to make further provision with respect to the same and for other purposes. | |
| Stonehaven Harbour Order Confirmation Act 1905 (repealed) | 5 Edw. 7. c. cxxv | 4 August 1905 |
An Act to confirm a Provisional Order under the Private Legislation Procedure (Scotland) Act 1899 Act 1899 relating to Stonehaven Harbour. (Repealed by Grampian Regional Council (Harbours) Order Confirmation Act 1987 (c. x))
| | Stonehaven Harbour Order 1905 Provisional Order to revive the powers and extend the time for the construction of Works at the Harbour of Stonehaven in the County of Kincardine authorised by the Stonehaven Harbour Order 1891 and extended by the Stonehaven Harbour Order 1896. | |
| Esk Valley Power-Gas Order Confirmation Act 1905 | 5 Edw. 7. c. cxxvi | 4 August 1905 |
An Act to confirm a Provisional Order under the Private Legislation Procedure (Scotland) Act 1899 relating to Esk Valley Power-Gas.
| | Esk Valley Power-Gas Order 1905 Provisional Order to incorporate and confer powers on the Esk Valley Power-Gas Company and for other purposes. | |
| Glasgow Corporation Order Confirmation Act 1905 | 5 Edw. 7. c. cxxvii | 4 August 1905 |
An Act to confirm a Provisional Order under the Private Legislation Procedure (Scotland) Act 1899 relating to Glasgow Corporation.
| | Glasgow Corporation Order 1905 Provisional Order to extend the Boundaries of the city of Glasgow to authorise the transfer to the Corporation of the Bazaar the Cheese Market the Clothes Market and the Bird and Dog Market and to authorise the Corporation to charge Market Rents Rates and Tolls thereat to authorise the Corporation to register Stables to amend the Glasgow Police Acts 1866 to 1904 to increase certain Police Assessments to authorise the Corporation to borrow money for the purposes of the Order and for other purposes. | |
| Glasgow Corporation (Tramways Consolidation) Order Confirmation Act 1905 (repealed) | 5 Edw. 7. c. cxxviii | 4 August 1905 |
An Act to confirm a Provisional Order under the Private Legislation Procedure (Scotland) Act 1899 relating to Glasgow Corporation Tramways. (Repealed by Glasgow Corporation Consolidation (Water, Transport and Markets) Order Confirmation Act 1964 (c. xliii))
| | Glasgow Corporation (Tramways Consolidation) Order 1905 Provisional Order to consolidate with amendments the Glasgow Corporation Tramways Acts 1870 to 1904 to authorise the Corporation of the city of Glasgow to construct new tramways and other works and to borrow money for that purpose to authorise the County Council of the county of Renfrew to acquire lands for widening certain bridges in that county and to borrow money for that purpose and for other purposes. | |
| Glasgow University Order Confirmation Act 1905 | 5 Edw. 7. c. cxxix | 4 August 1905 |
An Act to confirm a Provisional Order under the Private Legislation Procedure (Scotland) Act 1899 relating to the M'Callum Celtic Lectureship in the University of Glasgow.
| | Glasgow University (M'Callum Lectureship) Order 1905 Provisional Order to regulate the M'Callum Celtic Lectureship in the University of Glasgow and for other purposes. | |
| Paisley District Tramways Order Confirmation Act 1905 (repealed) | 5 Edw. 7. c. cxxx | 4 August 1905 |
An Act to confirm a Provisional Order under the Private Legislation Procedure (Scotland) Act 1899 relating to Paisley District Tramways. (Repealed by Glasgow Corporation Consolidation (Water, Transport and Markets) Order Confirmation Act 1964 (c. xliii))
| | Paisley District Tramways Order 1905 Provisional Order to authorise the Paisley District Tramways Company to construct additional tramways and other works and for other purposes. | |
| Hitchin and District Gas Act 1905 | 5 Edw. 7. c. cxxxi | 4 August 1905 |
An Act for incorporating and conferring Powers upon the Hitchin Gas Company Limited and for other purposes.
| Dublin, Wicklow and Wexford Railway Act 1905 | 5 Edw. 7. c. cxxxii | 4 August 1905 |
An Act to confer further powers on the Dublin Wicklow and Wexford Railway Company in relation to their General Undertaking and their separate Undertaking of the New Ross and Waterford Extension Railways and for other purposes.
| Worcestershire County Council (Bridges) Act 1905 (repealed) | 5 Edw. 7. c. cxxxiii | 4 August 1905 |
An Act to transfer the Hundred Bridges in the Doddingtree Hundred in the County of Worcester to the Worcestershire County Council and for other purposes. (Repealed by Statute Law (Repeals) Act 1998 (c. 43))
| Tees Valley Water Act 1905 (repealed) | 5 Edw. 7. c. cxxxiv | 4 August 1905 |
An Act to amend the Acts relating to the Tees Valley Water Board and to confer further borrowing and other powers on the Tees Valley Water Board. (Repealed by Tees Valley Water (Consolidation) Act 1907 (7 Edw. 7. c. lxxx))
| Whitby Urban District Council Act 1905 | 5 Edw. 7. c. cxxxv | 4 August 1905 |
An Act to enable the Urban District Council for the Urban District of Whitby in the North Riding of the County of York to acquire the Undertaking of the Whitby Harbour Trustees and the Market Rights within the District as well as certain Lands to make further provisions for the Improvement and good Government of the District and for other purposes.
| Metropolitan and Great Central Railways Act 1905 | 5 Edw. 7. c. cxxxvi | 4 August 1905 |
An Act for incorporating and conferring powers upon a Joint Committee of the Metropolitan and Great Central Railway Companies for leasing certain railways of the Metropolitan Company for confirming an Agreement between the two Companies in relation thereto and for other purposes.
| Western Valleys (Monmouthshire) Water and Gas Amendment Act 1905 (repealed) | 5 Edw. 7. c. cxxxvii | 4 August 1905 |
An Act to re-arrange the Capital and amend the Borrowing Powers of the Western Valleys (Monmouthshire) Water and Gas Company and for other purposes. (Repealed by Risca Urban District Council Act 1909 (9 Edw. 7. c. cxxxiii))
| Andover Lighting and Power Act 1905 | 5 Edw. 7. c. cxxxviii | 4 August 1905 |
An Act for incorporating and conferring powers upon the Andover Lighting and Power Company and for other purposes.
| Great Western Railway (Additional Powers) Act 1905 | 5 Edw. 7. c. cxxxix | 4 August 1905 |
An Act for conferring further powers upon the Great Western Railway Company in respect of their own undertaking and upon that Company and the London and North Western Railway Company in respect of an undertaking in which they are jointly interested and upon the Great Western and Metropolitan Railway Companies in respect of an undertaking in which they are jointly interested for amalgamating the Wye Valley Railway Company and the Lambourn Valley Railway Company with the Great Western Railway Company and for other purposes.
| Southend and Colchester Light Railways Act 1905 | 5 Edw. 7. c. cxl | 4 August 1905 |
An Act to empower the Southend and Colchester Light Railways Company to construct Piers to establish and work Ferries across the River Crouch and the River Blackwater, to acquire Creeksea Ferry to raise additional Capital and for other purposes.
| Whitechapel and Bow Railway Act 1905 | 5 Edw. 7. c. cxli | 4 August 1905 |
An Act to authorise the Whitechapel and Bow Railway Company to raise additional Capital and the London Tilbury and Southend and Metropolitan District Railway Companies to subscribe thereto and to raise additional Capital for that purpose and for other purposes.
| Great Northern Railway (Ireland) Act 1905 | 5 Edw. 7. c. cxlii | 4 August 1905 |
An Act to confer further powers upon the Great Northern Railway Company (Ireland) and for other purposes.
| London County Council (Money) Act 1905 (repealed) | 5 Edw. 7. c. cxliii | 4 August 1905 |
An Act to regulate the Expenditure of Money by the London County Council on Capital Account during the current Financial Period and the Raising of Money to meet such Expenditure and for other purposes. (Repealed by London County Council (Finance Consolidation) Act 1912 (2 & 3 Geo. 5. c. cv))
| Hessle Gas Act 1905 | 5 Edw. 7. c. cxliv | 4 August 1905 |
An Act for incorporating and conferring powers upon the Hessle Gas Light and Coke Company.
| Great Central Railway (Pension Fund) Act 1905 | 5 Edw. 7. c. cxlv | 4 August 1905 |
An Act to authorise the Great Central Railway Company to establish a Pension Fund and guarantee Pensions for the benefit of their salaried Officers and Clerks to alter modify and repeal certain provisions of the Acts relating to the Railway Clearing System Superannuation Fund Corporation and for other purposes.
| Metropolitan Electric Supply Company (Acton District) Act 1905 | 5 Edw. 7. c. cxlvi | 4 August 1905 |
An Act to authorise Agreements between the Metropolitan Electric Supply Company Limited and the Acton Urban District Council with respect to the supply of Electrical Energy by the Company to the District Council and to confer further powers on the Company.
| Workington Harbour and Dock Act 1905 (repealed) | 5 Edw. 7. c. cxlvii | 4 August 1905 |
An Act to incorporate a Board of Trustees and to authorise them to acquire the Workington Harbour and Lonsdale Dock Undertaking in the County of Cumberland and to construct an Extension Pier at Workington and for other purposes. (Repealed by Workington Harbour and Dock (Transfer) Act 1957 (5 & 6 Eliz. 2. c. xxxii))
| South Lancashire Tramways Act 1905 (repealed) | 5 Edw. 7. c. cxlviii | 4 August 1905 |
An Act to extend the time for taking Lands for the construction of certain Tramways Widenings and Works authorised by the South Lancashire Tramways Acts 1900 (Note: South Lancashire Tramways Act 1900 (63 & 64 Vict. c. ccxliii)) and 1901 (Note: South Lancashire Tramways Act 1901 (1 Edw. 7. c. cclvii)) to abandon certain Tramways authorised by the Act of 1900 and for other purposes. (Repealed by South Lancashire Transport Act 1958 (6 & 7 Eliz. 2. c. xxxiii))
| Matlock Bath Improvement Act 1905 (repealed) | 5 Edw. 7. c. cxlix | 4 August 1905 |
An Act to authorise new gasworks and remove the existing works to acquire lands for public improvements to provide a Pump Room and Baths and generally to confer further powers on the Urban District Council of Matlock Bath and Scarthin Nick in regard to the local government of their district. (Repealed by Matlocks Urban District Council Act 1927 (17 & 18 Geo. 5. c. xvii))
| Llandrindod Wells Urban District Council Act 1905 | 5 Edw. 7. c. cl | 4 August 1905 |
An Act to authorise the Urban District Council of Llandrindod Wells to make further provision with regard to the improvement health local government and finance of the district and for other purposes.
| Formby Urban District Council Act 1905 | 5 Edw. 7. c. cli | 4 August 1905 |
An Act to make the Township of Formby in the County of Lancaster a separate urban district to confirm an agreement relating to the transfer of property and liabilities to confer powers upon the Urban District Council in relation to the seashore and for other purposes.
| University of Sheffield Act 1905 | 5 Edw. 7. c. clii | 4 August 1905 |
An Act to dissolve the University College of Sheffield and to transfer all the property and liabilities of the University College of Sheffield to the University of Sheffield and for other purposes.
| Midland Railway Act 1905 | 5 Edw. 7. c. cliii | 4 August 1905 |
An Act to confer additional powers upon the Midland Railway Company for the construction of works and the acquisition of lands and for other purposes.
| Bootle Corporation Act 1905 (repealed) | 5 Edw. 7. c. cliv | 4 August 1905 |
An Act to extend the Borough of Bootle and for other purposes. (Repealed by County of Merseyside Act 1980 (c.x))
| London Gas Act 1905 | 5 Edw. 7. c. clv | 4 August 1905 |
An Act to amend the Acts relating to the supply of gas in London and to make further provisions with reference thereto.
| Caledonian Railway Act 1905 | 5 Edw. 7. c. clvi | 4 August 1905 |
An Act to confer further powers on the Caledonian Railway Company in relation to their Undertaking to authorise them or the Lanarkshire and Dumbartonshire Railway Company to construct a Railway to connect the Lanarkshire and Dumbartonshire Railway with the Clydebank Dock Branch of the North British Railway Company and to acquire a joint interest in such Dock Branch to authorise the Callander and Oban Railway Company to raise additional capital and to transfer to them the Leitir Mhor Pier and for other purposes.
| North British Railway (General Powers) Act 1905 | 5 Edw. 7. c. clvii | 4 August 1905 |
An Act to authorise the North British Railway Company to construct certain new Railways to raise additional Capital and for other purposes.
| Rhondda Urban District Council Act 1905 (repealed) | 5 Edw. 7. c. clviii | 4 August 1905 |
An Act to extend the time for the purchase of Land for the construction of Waterworks Tramways Street Widenings and other Works by the Rhondda Urban District Council to authorise the Council to construct new Gasworks and to confer upon the Council further powers with regard to the Health Improvement and Local Government of the District and for other purposes. (Repealed by Rhondda Corporation Act 1973 (c. xxiii))
| Rotherham, Maltby and Laughton Railway Act 1905 | 5 Edw. 7. c. clix | 4 August 1905 |
An Act for incorporating the Rotherham Maltby and Laughton Railway Company and authorising them to con- struct Railways in the West Riding of the County of York and for other purposes.
| Shropshire, Worcestershire and Staffordshire Electric Power Act 1905 (repealed) | 5 Edw. 7. c. clx | 4 August 1905 |
An Act to confer further powers upon the Shropshire Worcestershire and Staffordshire Electric Power Company and for other purposes. (Repealed by Shropshire, Worcestershire and Staffordshire Electric Power (Consolidation) Act 1938 (1 & 2 Geo. 6. c. lviii))
| Woolwich Borough Council Act 1905 (repealed) | 5 Edw. 7. c. clxi | 4 August 1905 |
An Act to authorise the Mayor Aldermen and Councillors of the Metropolitan Borough of Woolwich to widen Wickham Lane Bexley and to acquire Lands for various purposes and to confer upon the said Mayor Aldermen and Councillors further powers with respect to their Electrical Undertaking and to make further provisions in regard to the Health and Government of the Borough and for other purposes. (Repealed by Local Law (Greater London Council and Inner London Boroughs) Order 1965 (SI 1965/540))
| Skegness Water Act 1905 | 5 Edw. 7. c. clxii | 4 August 1905 |
An Act to incorporate and confer powers upon the Skegness Water Company and for other purposes.
| Great Northern, Piccadilly and Brompton Railway (Various Powers) Act 1905 | 5 Edw. 7. c. clxiii | 4 August 1905 |
An Act to confer further powers on the Great Northern Piccadilly and Brompton Railway Company.
| Metropolitan Electric Tramways Act 1905 | 5 Edw. 7. c. clxiv | 4 August 1905 |
An Act to confer powers on the Metropolitan Electric Tramways Limited for widening and altering roads and acquiring lands in the county of Middlesex and for other purposes.
| Dublin United Tramways Act 1905 | 5 Edw. 7. c. clxv | 4 August 1905 |
An Act to transfer the undertakings of the Dublin United Tramways Company and the Dublin Southern District Tramways Company to the Dublin United Tramways Company (1896) Limited and to amend the Acts relating to those Companies and for other purposes.
| London and North Western Railway Act 1905 | 5 Edw. 7. c. clxvi | 4 August 1905 |
An Act for conferring further powers upon the London and North Western Railway Company in relation to their own undertaking and upon that Company in conjunction with the Great Western Railway Company and the Furness Railway Company in relation to their respective joint undertakings and upon the North and South Western Junction Railway Company in respect of their undertaking and upon the London and North Western Railway Company in relation to the undertaking of the Dublin Wicklow and Wexford Railway Company and for other purposes.
| Charing Cross, Euston and Hampstead Railway Act 1905 | 5 Edw. 7. c. clxvii | 4 August 1905 |
An Act to confer further powers on the Charing Cross Euston and Hampstead Railway Company and for other purposes.
| Baker Street and Waterloo Railway Act 1905 | 5 Edw. 7. c. clxviii | 4 August 1905 |
An Act to confer further powers on the Baker Street and Waterloo Railway Company.
| Edgware and Hampstead Railway Act 1905 | 5 Edw. 7. c. clxix | 4 August 1905 |
An Act to authorise a deviation of part of the Edgware and Hampstead Railway and to confer further powers on the Edgware and Hampstead Railway Company and for other purposes.
| Gosport and Fareham Tramways Act 1905 | 5 Edw. 7. c. clxx | 4 August 1905 |
An Act to authorise the Portsmouth Street Tramways Company to construct additional tramways in the urban district of Gosport and Alverstoke and street works in that district and in the urban district of Fareham in the County of Southampton and for other purposes.
| Bristol Blind Asylum Act 1905 (repealed) | 5 Edw. 7. c. clxxi | 4 August 1905 |
An Act to authorise the institution known as the Bristol Asylum or School of Industry for the Blind to acquire and to hold lands for the purposes of that institution and to make further provision with respect to the constitution of the committee of management and the management of the institution the investment of the moneys of the institution and for other purposes. (Repealed by Statute Law (Repeals) Act 2013 (c. 2))
| Newcastle-upon-Tyne Corporation (Tolls) Act 1905 (repealed) | 5 Edw. 7. c. clxxii | 4 August 1905 |
An Act to enable the Mayor Aldermen and Citizens of the City and County of Newcastle-upon-Tyne to purchase by Agreement the Undertaking of the Scotswood Bridge Company to provide for the composition by the several Local Authorities interested of the tolls now leviable by the said Bridge Company and of the Toll known as the Thorough or Great Toll now leviable by the Newcastle Corporation and the extinction of those tolls respectively to provide for an increase in the Public Library Rate and for other purposes. (Repealed by Tyne & Wear Act 1980 (c. xliii))
| Blackpool Improvement Act 1905 | 5 Edw. 7. c. clxxiii | 4 August 1905 |
An Act to empower the Corporation of Blackpool to widen Lytham Road to construct additional tramways to extend their powers in regard to the supply of sea water to make further provision in regard to their loans and for other purposes.
| County of London Electric Supply Company's Act 1905 | 5 Edw. 7. c. clxxiv | 4 August 1905 |
An Act to authorise the County of London Electric Supply Company Limited to purchase lands and construct generating stations and for other purposes.
| Nottingham Corporation Act 1905 | 5 Edw. 7. c. clxxv | 4 August 1905 |
An Act to empower the Corporation of Nottingham to construct additional tramways to make certain street improvements and waterworks and for other purposes.
| North Metropolitan Electric Power Supply Act 1905 (repealed) | 5 Edw. 7. c. clxxvi | 4 August 1905 |
An Act for extending the Limits of Supply of and for conferring further powers upon the North Metropolitan Electric Power Supply Company and for other purposes. (Repealed by North Metropolitan Electric Power Supply (Consolidation) Act 1928 (18 & 19 Geo. 5. c. cxviii))
| Liverpool Corporation (General Powers) Act 1905 (repealed) | 5 Edw. 7. c. clxxvii | 4 August 1905 |
An Act for conferring on the Corporation of the City of Liverpool further Powers for the protection of the Public Health for the better prevention of Smoke Nuisance for the Regulation of Public Meetings and for licensing Cattle Drovers for making provisions as to the acquisition of Lands by the Corporation and as to the repayment of Moneys borrowed by the Corporation for certain objects and for other purposes. (Repealed by Liverpool Corporation Act 1921 (11 & 12 Geo. 5. c. lxxiv))
| Great Central Railway Act 1905 | 5 Edw. 7. c. clxxviii | 4 August 1905 |
An Act to authorise the construction of New Railways and Works and the acquisition of Lands by the Great Central Railway Company in connection with their undertaking the acquisition of Additional Lands and the execution of Works by the Cheshire Lines Committee and the Manchester South Junction and Altrincham Railway Company respectively in connection with their respective undertakings the acquisition by the Great Central Railway Company of the undertakings of the Wigan Junction Railways Company and the Liverpool St. Helens and South Lancashire Railway Company the incorporation of a Joint Committee of the Great Central and London and North Western Railway Companies and for other purposes.
| Humber Conservancy Act 1905 | 5 Edw. 7. c. clxxix | 4 August 1905 |
An Act to extend and amend the Humber Conservancy Acts 1852 to 1899 and to confer further Powers on the Humber Conservancy Commissioners and for other purposes.
| Littlehampton Urban District Council (Arun Bridge) Act 1905 | 5 Edw. 7. c. clxxx | 4 August 1905 |
An Act to empower the Urban District Council of Littlehampton to purchase the ferry rights over the River Arun at Littlehampton and to construct a bridge over that river and for other purposes.
| Shepton Mallet Gas Company (Electric Lighting) Act 1905 | 5 Edw. 7. c. clxxxi | 4 August 1905 |
An Act to empower the Shepton Mallet Gas Company to supply electricity within their limits of gas supply.
| Southport, Birkdale and West Lancashire Water Board Act 1905 | 5 Edw. 7. c. clxxxii | 4 August 1905 |
An Act to authorise the Southport Birkdale and West Lancashire Water Board to make new Waterworks and for other purposes.
| Ealing Corporation Act 1905 | 5 Edw. 7. c. clxxxiii | 4 August 1905 |
An Act to confer upon the Corporation of the Borough of Ealing further powers with respect to their Electric Lighting Undertaking and with respect to the regulation of streets and buildings sanitary matters recreation grounds and milk supply and to vest in the Corporation the appointment of Collectors of Poor Rates and for other purposes.
| Malvern Water Act 1905 | 5 Edw. 7. c. clxxxiv | 4 August 1905 |
An Act to confirm and legalise the construction of certain Waterworks constructed by the Urban District Council of Malvern for the supply of water to their District to authorise the Council to construct additional Waterworks for the supply thereof and for other purposes.
| Central Electric Supply Company's Act 1905 | 5 Edw. 7. c. clxxxv | 4 August 1905 |
An Act to extend the powers of the Central Electric Supply Company Limited and for other purposes.
| Rhymney and Aber Valleys Gas and Water Act 1905 | 5 Edw. 7. c. clxxxvi | 4 August 1905 |
An Act for conferring further powers on the Rhymney and Aber Valleys Gas and Water Company.
| Sandgate Urban District Council (Sanitary Powers) Act 1905 | 5 Edw. 7. c. clxxxvii | 4 August 1905 |
An Act to provide for the licensing and control of hospitals for disease and to make other provisions for the health of the Sandgate Urban District and for other purposes.
| London Government Scheme (London and Middlesex Adjustment) Confirmation Act 1905 | 5 Edw. 7. c. clxxxviii | 11 August 1905 |
An Act to confirm a Scheme made under the London Government Act 1899 (Note: London Government Act 1899 (62 & 63 Vict. c. 14)) relating to the Counties of London and Middlesex.
| | London and Middlesex (Adjustment) Scheme 1905 Scheme made under the London Government Act 1899. | |
| London Government Scheme (Hackney and Edmonton Unions Adjustment) Confirmation Act 1905 | 5 Edw. 7. c. clxxxix | 11 August 1905 |
An Act to confirm a Scheme made under the London Government Act 1899 relating to the Hackney and Edmonton Unions.
| | Hackney and Edmonton Unions (Adjustment) Scheme 1905 Scheme made under the London Government Act 1899. | |
| Pier and Harbour Order Confirmation (No. 1) Act 1905 | 5 Edw. 7. c. cxc | 11 August 1905 |
An Act to confirm a Provisional Order made by the Board of Trade under the General Pier and Harbour Act 1861 relating to Craster.
| | Craster Harbour Order 1905 Provisional Order under the General Pier and Harbour Acts. | |
| Wemyss Tramways Order Confirmation Act 1905 | 5 Edw. 7. c. cxci | 11 August 1905 |
An Act to confirm a Provisional Order under the Private Legislation Procedure (Scotland) Act 1899 relating to Wemyss Tramways.
| | Wemyss Tramways Order 1905 Provisional Order authorising Randolph Gordon Erskine Wemyss to make and maintain Tramways and other Works in the County of Fife and for other purposes. | |
| Electric Lighting Orders Confirmation (No. 9) Act 1905 | 5 Edw. 7. c. cxcii | 11 August 1905 |
An Act to confirm certain Provisional Orders made by the Board of Trade under the Electric Lighting Acts 1882 and 1888 relating to Brentford Croydon (Rural) Durham Districts Eastbourne (Willingdon Extension) Gravesend (Extension to Northfleet) Kingsbury Old Windsor and Wimborne and District.
| | Brentford Electric Lighting Order 1905 Provisional Order granted by the Board of Trade under the Electric Lighting Acts 1882 and 1888 to the Brentford Electric Supply Company Limited in respect of the Urban District of Brentford in the County of Middlesex. | |
| | Croydon Rural Electric Lighting Order 1905 Provisional Order granted by the Board of Trade under the Electric Lighting Acts 1882 and 1888 to the County of London Electric Supply Company Limited in respect of the Parishes of Addington Beddington Coulsdon Milcham Morden Sanderstead and Woodmansterne in the Rural District of Croydon in the County of Surrey. | |
| | Durham Districts Electric Lighting Order 1905 Provisional Order granted by the Board of Trade under the Electric Lighting Acts 1882 and 1888 to the County of Durham Electrical Power Distribution Company Limited in respect of certain Parishes or Townships in the Rural Districts of Durham and Chester-le-Street all in the County of Durham. | |
| | Eastbourne Corporation Electric Lighting (Willingdon Extension) Order 1905 Provisional Order granted by the Board of Trade under the Electric Lighting Acts 1882 and 1888 to the Mayor Aldermen and Burgesses of the Borough of Eastbourne for the extension of their Area of Supply to the Parish of Willingdon in the Rural District of Eastbourne in the County of Sussex and for the Amendment of the Eastbourne Electric Supply Order 1899. | |
| | Gravesend (Extension to Northfleet) Electric Lighting Order 1905 Provisional Order granted by the Board of Trade under the Electric Lighting Acts 1882 and 1888 to the Mayor Aldermen and Burgesses of the Borough of Gravesend in respect of the Urban District of Northfleet in the County of Kent. | |
| | Kingsbury Electric Lighting Order 1905 Provisional Order granted by the Board of Trade under the Electric Lighting Acts 1882 and 1888 to the Urban District Council of Kingsbury in respect of the Urban District of Kingsbury in the County of Middlesex. | |
| | Old Windsor Electric Lighting Order 1905 Provisional Order granted by the Board of Trade under the Electric Lighting Acts 1882 and 1888 to the Windsor Electrical Installation Company Limited in respect of the Parish of Old Windsor in the Rural District of Windsor in the County of Berks. | |
| | Wimbourne and District Electric Lighting Order 1905 Provisional Order granted by the Board of Trade under the Electric Lighting Acts 1882 and 1888 to the Bournemouth and Poole Electricity Supply. Company Limited in respect of the Urban District of Wimborne the Parishes of Canford Magna and Kinson in the Rural District of Poole and the Parishes of Colehill Hampreston Pamphill and West Parley in the Rural District of Wimborne and Cranborne all in the County of Dorset. | |
| Tramways Orders Confirmation (No. 1) Act 1905 | 5 Edw. 7. c. cxciii | 11 August 1905 |
An Act to confirm certain Provisional Orders made by the Board of Trade under the Tramways Act 1870 (Note: Tramways Act 1870 (33 & 34 Vict. c. 78)) relating to Bradford Corporation Tramways Gorton Urban District Council Tramways Keighley Corporation Tramways Leeds Corporation Tramways Liverpool Corporation Tramways Extensions and Pudsey Corporation Tramways.
| | Bradford Corporation Tramways Order 1905 Order authorising the Mayor Aldermen and Citizens of the City of Bradford to construct additional Tramways in the said City. | |
| | Gorton Urban District Council Tramways Order 1905 Order authorising the Urban District Council of Gorton to construct Tramways in their District. | |
| | Keighley Corporation Tramways Order 1905 Order authorising the Mayor Aldermen and Burgesses of the Borough of Keighley to construct an additional Tramway in the said Borough. | |
| | Leeds Corporation Tramways Order 1905 Order authorising the Lord Mayor Aldermen and Citizens of the City of Leeds to construct additional Tramways in their City. | |
| | Liverpool Corporation Tramways Extensions Order 1905 Order authorising the Mayor Aldermen and Citizens of the City of Liverpool to construct additional Tramways in the said City. | |
| | Pudsey Corporation Tramways Order 1905 Order authorising the Mayor Aldermen and Burgesses of the Borough of Pudsey to construct Tramways in their Borough. | |
| Tramways Orders Confirmation (No. 2) Act 1905 | 5 Edw. 7. c. cxciv | 11 August 1905 |
An Act to confirm certain Provisional Orders made by the Board of Trade under the Tramways Act 1870 relating to Colchester Corporation Tramways King's Norton and Northfield Urban District Council Tramway Luton Corporation Tramways Portobello and Musselburgh Tramways (Amendment) and Southampton Corporation Tramways.
| | Colchester Corporation Tramways Order 1905 Order authorising the Mayor Aldermen and Buryesses of the Borough of Colchester to construct an additional Tramway in the said Borough and for other purposes. | |
| | King's Norton and Northfield Urban District Council Tramways Order 1905 Order authorising the Urban District Council of King's Norton and Northfield to construct an additional Tramway in their Urban District and for other purposes. | |
| | Luton Corporation Tramways Order 1905 Order authorising the Mayor Aldermen and Burgesses of the Borough of Luton to construct Tramways in their Borough. | |
| | Portobello and Musselburgh Tramways (Amendment) Order 1905 Order granted to the National Electric Construction Company Limited amending the Portobello and Musselburgh Tramways Orders 1900 and 1903. | |
| | Southampton Corporation Tramways Order 1905 Order authorising the Mayor Aldermen and Burgesses of the Borough of Southampton to construct additional Tramways in the said Borough. | |
| Fraserburgh Harbour Order Confirmation Act 1905 (repealed) | 5 Edw. 7. c. cxcv | 11 August 1905 |
An Act to confirm a Provisional Order under the Private Legislation Procedure (Scotland) Act 1899 relating to Fraserburgh Harbour. (Repealed by Fraserburgh Harbour Order Confirmation Act 1985 (c. xlv))
| | Fraserburgh Harbour Order 1905 Provisional Order to authorise the construction of piers and other works at the harbour of Fraserburgh in the county of Aberdeen to authorise the Fraserburgh Harbour Commissioners to borrow additional money to alter tonnage rates to alter the mode of electing the Commissioners and for other purposes. | |
| Bangor (County Down) Water and Improvement Act 1905 | 5 Edw. 7. c. cxcvi | 11 August 1905 |
An Act to confer powers on the Urban District Council of Bangor in the County of Down for the construction of new Waterworks for the extension of their Gas Undertaking for the regulation and control of the Seashore and adjoining Lands and for the Improvement and Local Government of their District and for other purposes.
| Ribble Navigation Act 1905 (repealed) | 5 Edw. 7. c. cxcvii | 11 August 1905 |
An Act to confer further powers on the Corporation of Preston with reference to the Ribble Navigation and for other purposes. (Repealed by Preston Borough Council Act 1981 (c. xxii))
| Thames Conservancy Act 1905 (repealed) | 5 Edw. 7. c. cxcviii | 11 August 1905 |
An Act to confer further money and other powers on the Conservators of the River Thames for the deepening widening and improvement of its bed and channel between the Nore and Gravesend and for other purposes. (Repealed by Port of London (Consolidation) Act 1920 (10 & 11 Geo. 5. c. clxxiii))
| Oldham and Saddleworth District Tramways Act 1905 | 5 Edw. 7. c. cxcix | 11 August 1905 |
An Act to confer further Powers upon the Oldham and Saddleworth District Tramways Company for the Construction of a Tramroad and for other purposes.
| Metropolitan Electric Supply Company (Various Powers) Act 1905 | 5 Edw. 7. c. cc | 11 August 1905 |
An Act to confer further powers on the Metropolitan Electric Supply Company Limited with respect to Electrical Energy and for other purposes.
| North Eastern Railway Act 1905 | 5 Edw. 7. c. cci | 11 August 1905 |
An Act to confer additional powers upon the North Eastern Railway Company for the construction of new Railways Dock Works and other Works and the acquisition of Lands and for other purposes.
| North Eastern Railway (Steam Vessels) Act 1905 | 5 Edw. 7. c. ccii | 11 August 1905 |
An Act to authorise the North Eastern Railway Company to own and use Vessels for the conveyance of traffic between the Port of Hull and certain Continental Ports and to subscribe to the funds of Steamship Companies and for other purposes.
| Acton Sewage Act 1905 | 5 Edw. 7. c. cciii | 11 August 1905 |
An Act to authorise the Urban District Council of Acton to construct and maintain Sewerage and Sewage Outfall Works and to make further provision for the admission of sewage into the Metropolitan Main Drainage System from the Urban District of Acton and for other purposes.
| Bolton Corporation Act 1905 | 5 Edw. 7. c. cciv | 11 August 1905 |
An Act to authorise the Mayor Aldermen and Burgesses of the Borough of Bolton to construct Additional Waterworks to make Street Improvements to confer upon them further powers with respect to the Supply of Electricity Streets Buildings Sewers and Drains and with respect to the Local Government and Health of the Borough to raise Additional Money to make further provisions as to Rates and Rating in the Borough and for other purposes.
| Halifax Corporation Act 1905 (repealed) | 5 Edw. 7. c. ccv | 11 August 1905 |
An Act to confer further powers on the Mayor Aldermen and Burgesses of the County Borough of Halifax with respect to the disposal of trade refuse and for the construction of additional Tramways and in regard to Streets and Buildings and for the Health Local Government and Improvement of the Borough and for other purposes. (Repealed by West Yorkshire Act 1980 (c.xiv))
| London County Council (General Powers) Act 1905 | 5 Edw. 7. c. ccvi | 11 August 1905 |
An Act to empower the London County Council to execute Works and to acquire Lands and utilise other Lands to authorise the extension of Hampstead Heath and the exchange of Lands in connection with Parks Commons and Open Spaces to extend the time for the completion of certain authorised Works to provide for the registration of Employment Agencies to confer further powers upon the Council of the Metropolitan Borough of Battersea with respect to Latchmere Allotments to provide for Contributions by the Councils of Metropolitan Boroughs to expenditure by the London County Council and for other purposes.
| Newry, Keady and Tynan Light Railway Act 1905 | 5 Edw. 7. c. ccvii | 11 August 1905 |
An Act to rename the Ulster and Connaught Light Railways Company the Newry Keady and Tynan Light Railway Company to authorise the Company to acquire additional lands to extend the time limited by the Newry Keady and Tynan Light Railway Act 1900 (Note: Newry Keady and Tynan Light Railway Act 1900 (63 & 64 Vict. c. cclxxv)) and the Ulster and Connaught Light Railways Act 1903 (Note: Ulster and Connaught Light Railways Act 1903 (3 Edw. 7. c. cclxii)) for the compulsory purchase of lands for the purposes thereof and for the completion of the railways thereby authorised to sanction the purchase of the Bessbrook and Newry Railway and for other purposes.
| North East London Railway Act 1905 (repealed) | 5 Edw. 7. c. ccviii | 11 August 1905 |
An Act for incorporating the North East London Railway Company and for empowering them to construct Railways from the City of London to Walthamstow Epping Forest and Waltham Abbey and for other purposes. (Repealed by Statute Law (Repeals) Act 2013 (c. 2))
| London Building Acts (Amendment) Act 1905 (repealed) | 5 Edw. 7. c. ccix | 11 August 1905 |
An Act to amend the Acts relating to Buildings in London to confer various powers on the London County Council and for other purposes. (Repealed by London Building Act 1930 (20 & 21 Geo. 5. c. clviii))
| Heckmondwike Improvement Act 1905 (repealed) | 5 Edw. 7. c. ccx | 11 August 1905 |
An Act to confer upon the Urban District Council of Heckmondwike further powers with regard to the supply of water and electricity and the improvement health local government and finance of the district and for other purposes . (Repealed by West Yorkshire Act 1980 (c. xiv))
| Bristol Corporation Act 1905 | 5 Edw. 7. c. ccxi | 11 August 1905 |
An Act to empower the Corporation of Bristol to execute Works to make further provision for the Improvement Health Local Government and Finance of the City of Bristol and for other purposes.
| Wigan Corporation Act 1905 | 5 Edw. 7. c. ccxii | 11 August 1905 |
An Act to consolidate and amend the provisions relating to the tramway undertaking of the Mayor Aldermen and Burgesses of the borough of Wigan and to confer further powers upon them in relation to that undertaking to empower them to erect a town hall and public baths to make provision for the establishment of a cattle mart and for other purposes.
| South Barracas (Buenos Aires) Gas and Coke Company Act 1905 | 5 Edw. 7. c. ccxiii | 11 August 1905 |
An Act for increasing the capital of the South Barracas (Buenos Ayres) Gas and Coke Company Limited by the creation of paid-up shares and providing for the issue thereof to the shareholders and for other purposes.

=== Private and personal acts ===
| Short title | Citation | Royal assent |
Long title
| Barrymore Estate Act 1905 | 5 Edw. 7. c. 1 Pr. | 11 July 1905 |
An Act to enable the Baron Barrymore to restore certain forfeited Leases in the Town of Tipperary, and for other purposes.
| Corbett Estate Act 1905 | 5 Edw. 7. c. 2 Pr. | 4 August 1905 |
An Act to remove difficulties which prevent the dealing by way of mortgage with the fee simple of certain estates of the late Thomas George Corbett, Esquire, deceased, situate in the County of Lincoln, and for other purposes.
| Earl of Stamford's Cheshire Estate Act 1905 | 5 Edw. 7. c. 3 Pr. | 11 August 1905 |
Au Act for the settlement of the hereditaments and property representing the estates devised by the Will, dated the 26th day of June 1875, of the Right Honourable George Harry Earl of Stamford and Warrington, and in such Will referred toas the Cheshire Estate, and for other purposes.
| McConnell's Divorce Act 1905 (Note: This act was not printed by the King's Printer) | 5 Edw. 7. c. 4 Pr. | 30 June 1905 |
An Act to dissolve the Marriage of Sir Robert john McConnell, Baronet, of Windsor Avenue, in the County and City of Belfast, with Elsie George McConnell, his now wife, and to enable him to marry again, and for other purposes.
| Lautour's Divorce Act 1905 | 5 Edw. 7. c. 5 Pr. | 30 June 1905 |
An Act to dissolve the Marriage of Jane Sarah Victoria Lautour, of Ansty House, Erdington, in the County of Warwick, with Ernest Latour, her husband, and to enable her to marry again, and for other purposes.
| Malone's Divorce (Validation) Act 1905 | 5 Edw. 7. c. 6 Pr. | 30 June 1905 |
An Act to remove doubts as to the validity of a certain Decree, dated twenty-second November one thousand eight hundred and ninety-two, of the High Court of Justice (Probate, Divorce, and Admiralty Division) dissolving the Marriage solemnized on the eleventh July one thousand eight hundred and seventy-two between John Richard Malone and Charlotte Mildred Malone, then Charlotte Mildred Yarde-Buller, spinster, and to confirm the said Decree.
| Gamble's Divorce Act 1905 | 5 Edw. 7. c. 7 Pr. | 30 June 1905 |
An Act to dissolve the Marriage of Charles George Gamble (formerly of No. 14, Rostrevor Terrace, Orwell Road, Rathgar, but now of Mount Jerome House, both in the County of Dublin, and of 39, Fleet Street, in the City of Dublin), Solicitor of the Supreme Court of judicature, Ireland, with Ida Gertrude Gamble, his now wife, and to enable him to marry again, and other purposes.
| Donovan's Divorce Act 1905 | 5 Edw. 7. c. 8 Pr. | 11 July 1905 |
An Act to dissolve the Marriage of Alice Edith Donovan, the wife of Daniel Augustine Donovan, with the said Daniel Augustine Donovan, and to enable her to marry again, and for other purposes.

=== Sources ===
- 5 Edward VII - 1905 – via HathiTrust.

== See also ==
- List of acts of the Parliament of the United Kingdom
