= South Lancashire Tramways =

Tramway operator in England

Operation
- Locale: St Helens, Swinton, Westhoughton and Hulton Lane
- Open: 20 October 1902
- Close: 16 December 1933
- Status: Closed

Infrastructure
- Track gauge: 1,435 mm (4 ft 8 1/2 in)
- Propulsion system: Electric
- Depot: Howe Bridge

Statistics
- Route length: 39.1 miles (62.9 km)

South Lancashire Tramways Act 1900
- Act of Parliament
- Parliament of the United Kingdom
- Long title: An Act to incorporate the South Lancashire Tramways Company and to empower that Company to make tramways and street improvements and for other purposes.
- Citation: 63 & 64 Vict. c. ccxliii

Dates
- Royal assent: 6 August 1900

Other legislation
- Repealed by: South Lancashire Transport Act 1958

Status: Repealed

South Lancashire Tramways Act 1901
- Act of Parliament
- Parliament of the United Kingdom
- Long title: An Act to confer further powers upon the South Lancashire Tramways Company for the construction of tramways and street improvements and for other purposes.
- Citation: 1 Edw. 7. c. cclvii

Dates
- Royal assent: 17 August 1901

Other legislation
- Repealed by: South Lancashire Transport Act 1958

Status: Repealed

Text of statute as originally enacted

South Lancashire Tramways Act 1903
- Act of Parliament
- Parliament of the United Kingdom
- Long title: An Act to authorise the South Lancashire Tramways Company to construct additional tramways and other works and to extend the time for taking lands and for the construction and completion of certain authorised tramways and widenings and for other purposes.
- Citation: 3 Edw. 7. c. clviii

Dates
- Royal assent: 11 August 1903

Other legislation
- Repealed by: South Lancashire Transport Act 1958

Status: Repealed

Text of statute as originally enacted

South Lancashire Tramways Act 1905
- Act of Parliament
- Parliament of the United Kingdom
- Long title: An Act to extend the time for taking Lands for the construction of certain Tramways Widenings and Works authorised by the South Lancashire Tramways Acts 1900 and 1901 to abandon certain Tramways authorised by the Act of 1900 and for other purposes.
- Citation: 5 Edw. 7. c. cxlviii

Dates
- Royal assent: 4 August 1905

Other legislation
- Repealed by: South Lancashire Transport Act 1958

Status: Repealed

Text of statute as originally enacted

South Lancashire Tramways Act 1906
- Act of Parliament
- Parliament of the United Kingdom
- Long title: An Act to extend the time for purchasing lands and for the construction and completion of certain tramways street widenings and works authorised by the South Lancashire Tramways Acts 1900 1901 and 1903 and for other purposes.
- Citation: 6 Edw. 7. c. xxxviii

Dates
- Royal assent: 22 June 1906

Other legislation
- Repealed by: South Lancashire Transport Act 1958

Status: Repealed

Text of statute as originally enacted

South Lancashire Tramways Act 1911
- Act of Parliament
- Parliament of the United Kingdom
- Long title: An Act to authorise the South Lancashire Tramways Company to construct additional tramways and other works and for other purposes.
- Citation: 1 & 2 Geo. 5. c. lv

Dates
- Royal assent: 18 August 1911

Other legislation
- Repealed by: South Lancashire Transport Act 1958

Status: Repealed

Text of statute as originally enacted

South Lancashire Tramways was a system of electric tramways in south Lancashire authorised by the South Lancashire Tramways Act 1900 (63 & 64 Vict. c. ccxliii). The South Lancashire Tramways Company was authorised by the act to build over 62 miles (100 km) of track to serve the towns between St Helens (now in Merseyside), Swinton, Westhoughton and Hulton Lane where the Bolton Corporation system ended. The system was the largest standard-gauge electric tramway outside London.

At the peak of Britain's first-generation tramways, it was possible to travel by tram all the way from Pier Head at Liverpool to the Pennines in Rochdale by tram.

The company had difficulty raising capital and at the end of November 1900 its shares were acquired by the South Lancashire Electric Traction and Power Company. It also acquired the shares of the Lancashire Light Railways Company and the South Lancashire Electric Supply Company. Construction began in late 1901 and in October 1902 the first section from Lowton through Leigh and Atherton to Four Lane Ends at Over Hulton opened.

Atherton became the centre of the system and the tram sheds, power station and offices were built on the north side of Leigh Road at Howe Bridge (grid reference SD 6624 0203).

Unrestored tram body, No 65 built by Brush Electrical Engineering Company in 1906, is in the collection of the Museum of Transport, Greater Manchester.
