= Unemployed Workmen Act 1905 =

Act of the Parliament of the United Kingdom

The Unemployed Workmen Act 1905 (Note: Section 7.)
- Act of Parliament
- Parliament of the United Kingdom
- Long title: An Act to establish organisation with a view to the provision of Employment or Assistance for Unemployed Workmen in proper cases.
- Citation: 5 Edw. 7. c. 18
- Territorial extent: United Kingdom

Dates
- Royal assent: 11 August 1905
- Commencement: 11 August 1905 (Note: Section 8.)
- Expired: 11 August 1908
- Repealed: England and Wales: 1 April 1930; Scotland: 16 May 1930
Other legislation
Repealed by	England and Wales: Local Government Act 1929; Scotland: Local Government (Scotland) Act 1929

Status: Repealed

Text of statute as originally enacted

The Unemployed Workmen Act 1905 (5 Edw. 7. c. 18) was an act of the Parliament of the United Kingdom. It established Distress Committees that gave out single grants to businesses or local authorities to allow them to hire more workers to decrease the number of people out of work. However, those with a criminal record were not given the opportunity to work the businesses being given grants.

== Subsequent developments ==
The whole act was repealed for England and Wales by sections 12 and 137 of, and part I of the twelfth schedule to, the Local Government Act 1929 (19 & 20 Geo. 5. c. 17), which came into force on 1 April 1930, subject to the savings in sections 12 and 137.

The whole act was repealed for Scotland by section 79(1) of, and the ninth schedule to, the Local Government (Scotland) Act 1929 (19 & 20 Geo. 5. c. 25), which came into force on 1 April 1930, subject to the savings in sections 12 and 137.

The whole act was repealed for the Republic of Ireland, by section 1 of, and part 4 of the schedule to, the Statute Law Revision (Pre-1922) Act 2005, subject to section 2(1) of that act.

== Bibliography ==
- James Sutherland Cotton (ed). "Unemployed Workmen Act, 1905". The Practical Statutes of the Session 1905. (Paterson's Practical Statutes). Horace Cox. London. Page 87 et seq. Google
- J M Lely. "Unemployed Workmen Act, 1905". Statutes of Practical Utility Passed in 1905. Sweet and Maxwell. Stevens and Sons. 1905. Page 686 et seq. Google
- J M Lely and W H Aggs. "Unemployed Workmen Act, 1905". The Statutes of Practical Utility. Sweet and Maxwell. 1908. Volume 10. Page 686 et seq.
- W H Aggs. "The Unemployed Workmen Act, 1905". Chitty's Statutes of Practical Utility. Sixth Edition. 1913. Volume 15. Page 737 et seq.
- The Scots Statutes, 1905.
- The Public General Statutes Affecting Scotland. 1905. Page 57.
- Alex Glen, Randolph A Glen and G W Bailey. "The Unemployed Workmen Act, 1905". Glen's Law of Public Health and Local Government. Sweet & Maxwell. Chancery Lane, London. 1922. Volume 2. Page 2185 et seq.
- "The Unemployed Workmen Act, 1905" (1905) 69 The Justice of the Peace 505 (No 43, 28 October 1905)
- "Provision of Temporary Work for Unemployed Workmen" (1905) 49 The Solicitors' Journal 834 (28 October 1905)
- 5 Irish Jurist and Local Government Review 344 and 347
