= Trolleybuses in South Lancashire =

South Lancashire trolleybus system

Operation
- Locale: Lancashire, England
- Open: 3 August 1930
- Close: 31 August 1958
- Status: Closed
- Routes: 4
- Operator: South Lancashire Transport

Infrastructure
- Stock: 71 (maximum)

The South Lancashire trolleybus system once served towns in South Lancashire, England, including Atherton, Bolton, Swinton and Leigh (all now in Greater Manchester) and St Helens (now in Merseyside). Opened on 3 August 1930, it replaced the South Lancashire Tramways network.

By the standards of the various now-defunct trolleybus systems in the United Kingdom, the South Lancashire system was of medium size, with four routes and a maximum fleet of 71 trolleybuses. It was closed on 31 August 1958.

None of the former South Lancashire trolleybuses has been preserved.

== History and background ==
Trackless trolleybuses were first considered in 1922 by the independent South Lancashire Tramways Company – a subsidiary company of the Lancashire United Transport and Power Company – as substitute vehicles for its tramcar fleet. However the manager of the undertaking Mr E. H. Edwardes found the trackless trolleybuses of the time slow and rough-riding and deemed them unsuitable. By 1928 infrastructure renewals on the South Lancashire Tramways – including the doubling of single and loop tram track and new tramcars – were indicated. The projected expenses for these were very high because tramway industry costs had doubled since the end of the First World War. This factor led the company to consider again replacing the tramcars by trackless trolleybuses. Advances in trackless trolleybus design such as lower overall body height and foot controls meant that its tramcar ancestry was much less evident. Increased passenger carrying capacity and covered staircases, more rapid acceleration, pneumatic tyres and passenger comfort in the form of upholstered seats in the late 1920s had made this type of electrically powered vehicle a more attractive proposition than the then contemporary motorbus. Trackless trolleybuses replacing the tramcars in South Lancashire would also be able to utilise the existing company power plant and electrical feeder system and would release the company from using fixed rails which attracted a rateable value payable in each separate locality of the several that the system traversed. In any case, some of the roads traversed by the SLT trams were unable to accommodate double tram track and their associated loading gauges but they would be able to accommodate two passing trolleybuses.

=== Act of Parliament, plans and execution ===
South Lancashire Transport Act 1929
- Act of Parliament
- Parliament of the United Kingdom
- Long title: An Act to authorise the South Lancashire Tramways Company to provide and run trolley vehicles and omnibuses to change the name of the Company and for other purposes.
- Citation: 19 & 20 Geo. 5. c. lxxxiii

Dates
- Royal assent: 10 May 1929

Other legislation
- Repealed by: South Lancashire Transport Act 1958

Status: Repealed

Text of statute as originally enacted

The South Lancashire Transport Act 1929 (19 & 20 Geo. 5. c. lxxxiii) allowed the company name to be altered from the South Lancashire Tramways Company to South Lancashire Transport Company. It also authorised the company to abandon its tram routes and to run trackless trolleybuses in their place notwithstanding certain restrictions placed on some established lines, notably from Leigh to Lowton.

The first section converted from tram to trolleybus was the Atherton to Ashton-in-Makerfield section which opened on 3 August 1930. The remainder of the system was converted thus:

- Ashton-in-Makerfield to Haydock 21 June 1931
- Atherton to Farnworth 19 August 1931
- Leigh (Spinning Jenny Street) to Bolton 17 December 1933.

=== Growth of system ===
On 21 March 1934 the Nottingham Evening Post reported that the South Lancashire Transport Company was the second largest in the country with 27 miles of route and 46 vehicles

==== Characteristics of the system ====
Although Atherton could be considered the hub of the South Lancashire Trolleybus network, this was an unusual and atypical trolleybus system in that it primarily provided long interurban routes rather than the short urban routes with frequent stops which would come to constitute accepted trolleybus practice in the United Kingdom. These long routes on the SLT system connected somewhat scattered mill and mining towns and villages as well as some isolated collieries on the South Lancashire coalfield. The routes followed almost exactly the lines of the former South Lancashire Tramways and also included long sections of route in open countryside. Contemporary timetables indicate an average service speed of 12mph or faster which was a considerable improvement over the trams' average service speed of 8mph.

== Routes and services ==
The main routes and services were as follows:

- Atherton to St. Helens (14 miles)
- Atherton to Farnworth (14.3 miles)
- Leigh to Bolton (8.6 miles)

Two of these routes were among the longest daily scheduled trolleybus routes in the United Kingdom. Additionally, on Saturdays from 23 December 1933 to early September 1939, the Atherton to Farnworth route was extended beyond Atherton to Leigh making it for a time the longest regular through trolleybus route in the country at 17.1 miles Leigh to Farnworth (Saturdays only)

=== Supplementary and extra services ===
In addition to the main services, there were daily shift and rush-hour associated "extras" as well as short workings (known to platform staff and local people as "Jiggers") between the following destinations:

- Leigh (Spinning Jenny Street) and Mosley Common
- Leigh (Spinning Jenny Street) and Four Lane Ends
- Bolton (Howell Croft) and Hulton Lane (ceased 25 March 1956)
- Bolton (Howell Croft) and Four Lane Ends (ceased 25 March 1956)
- Swinton and Farnworth
- Walkden and Farnworth
- Swinton and Worsley
- Atherton and Tyldesley
- Leigh (Spinning Jenny Street) and Tyldesley
- Atherton and Boothstown
- Haydock and Ashton-in-Makerfield
- Hindley and Hindley Green "Leigh (Road)"

The short workings at shift times and the "jiggers" therefore provided periods of intensive service over sections of the main routes. Details can be seen in.

==== Joint working with other systems ====
South Lancashire Transport also ran two joint trolleybus services. One such service ran between Atherton and St Helens with St. Helens Corporation and the second ran between Leigh and Bolton with Bolton Corporation. Joint trolleybus routes were comparatively rare in the United Kingdom - two other examples of joint trolleybus operation being the Mexborough and Swinton Traction Company and Rotherham Corporation and the Corporations of Manchester and Ashton-under-Lyne (whose vehicles once also interran with those of Oldham Corporation).

== Other operational practices ==
=== Route numbers and destination indicators ===
No route numbers or intermediate points of travel were ever displayed on the SLT vehicles. Only the final destination was shown on the front and back of the vehicles However, from 1943, St. Helens Corporation gave the St. Helens to Atherton service the number 1 and displayed this on its own vehicles; its service to Ashton in Makerfield the number 2 and that to Haydock the number 3 with a further number 3A reserved for workings to Blackbrook, short of Haydock. For its part from June 1940, Bolton Corporation numbered its trolleybus services thus: Bolton to Hulton Lane 17A; Bolton to Four Lane Ends 17B; and Bolton to Leigh 17C, although these numbers only appeared in timetables provided by Bolton Corporation and never on the vehicles themselves.

=== Bus stop signs and flags ===
From 1930 until 1940 no Trolleybus Stop signs or flags were used anywhere on the system. Since the inception of the South Lancashire Tramways trams, all stops - both compulsory (Board of Trade) and request - being indicated by a white band painted on the green traction poles. Local practice dictated that the stop was observed on both sides of the road even when there was only one traction pole with a bracket arm. However during the blackout in the 1939-1945 war and as the white bands faded, Bus Stop signs and flags became necessary and were provided by the company. The timetable up to 1939 had stated that in rural parts of the routes, the trolleybuses would pick up and set down passengers "anywhere within reason."

=== Ticketing ===
On the Bolton and Farnworth routes no through fares or tickets were available, passengers having to pay again at the boundaries (for a journey to Bolton originating from the Leigh side of Four Lane Ends, a new ticket had to be purchased at Four Lane Ends; for through passengers to Farnworth, a new ticket had to be purchased at Swinton Church)

==== Route topography aspects ====
At Platt Bridge the SLT trolleybus route to St. Helens ran along the company's private tramroad (Templeton Road) which dated to 1903. This unmetalled section still included the tram rails around which the only paving was the statutory requirement provided pursuant to the Tramways Act 1870 (33 & 34 Vict. c. 78) and the South Lancashire Tramways Act 1903 (3 Edw. 7. c. clviii). The road was not used by other vehicles (except for access) than SLT trolleybuses and those of St. Helen's Corporation on the joint trolleybus service to Atherton.

== Vehicles ==
The original batch of ten Guy BTX trolleybuses was bodied by Charles H. Roe Ltd., to a lowbridge design.

Four of the trolleybuses in the South Lancashire fleet belonged to Bolton Corporation. They were not painted in the Bolton Corporation livery however and were numbered within the series of South Lancashire company vehicles. When the system closed in 1958, these four vehicles were taken to Bolton Corporation bus depot for the first time but only for scrapping purposes.

So high was the increase in passengers during the war due to the influx of workers to factories engaged in war work in the area, that the company was allocated new trolleybuses during the war.

=== Depots ===
The South Lancashire Transport Company used three depots. The main depot, power station and offices were at Howe Bridge (between Atherton and Leigh). The other depots were at Swinton (Partington Lane) and Platt Bridge. These depots also housed vehicles (motor buses) of sister company Lancashire United Transport.

== Company reputation and unique practices ==
This was an efficient service but with less intensive frequencies than might be encountered in more urban trolleybus systems. The system was held to employ eccentric practices not encountered on other British trolleybus systems. For example some span wires were secured to convenient trees in the Boothstown area after the failure of traction poles through rust. Occasional use of live but insulated DC trailing cables (jump leads) in the street supervised by SLT staff when trolleybuses had to be manoeuvred or turned short of their usual terminus during Whitsuntide religious processions was also confined to this company.

Amongst transport historians and enthusiasts South Lancashire Transport also gained several unique reputations during its operations. For example, utilising its equipment to the maximum. Some of the original vehicles from 1930 were still in service on the very last day (31 August 1958). In addition, several overhead wiring bracket arm supports in the Leigh and Bamfurlong areas remained throughout the life of the system at the gauge of 18 inches (the gauge of the original 1930 installation) and were never upgraded to the standard 24 inches throughout the life of the system. Both gauges could be seen at several places on the system on opposite sides of the same road, for example in Atherton at the bifurcation of the Bolton and Farnworth services and at the curve leading from Partington Lane to the main A6 road at Swinton.

=== Overhead layout and construction ===
Eschewing the use of outside contractors and modern overhead practices, the company also installed its own overhead (based on tramway practice) and this made for some awkward vehicle road-positioning at times. Sometimes the traction wires were not adjusted even after new road alignments had been constructed. Overhead line work on the SLT system also included the retention and use of two of the original detached reversing triangles to the very last day of the system - although other original detached triangles had been converted during the war to assist in the blackout. The detached triangles proved difficult in the dark and to avoid too much pole shifting, gravity reversing on advantageous camber would sometimes be carried out by SLT crews at both Boothstown and Sandhole colliery in preference to connecting to the detached reversing triangles.

==== Street lighting obligation ====
From its very first days as a tramway operator, the South Lancashire company had been obliged to provide electric street lighting along all of its routes at no cost to the local authorities. In 1945 the councils of Abram, Ashton-in-Makerfield, Hindley, Worsley, Westhoughton, Ince-in-Makerfield, Haydock and Tyldesley were in negotiation with the SLT as to apportionment of costs for installation and improvement of street lighting which was by then considered "deficient". The decision was made that some of the local authorities would supply improved lighting and that the South Lancashire company would supply only the electric current. The street lighting obligation ended upon the winding up of the SLT company on 31 August 1958. Some areas - notably Bamfurlong RDC - had not made adequate provision by that date and so, with the ending of the SLT trolleybus service, the main road along which the service had run was left unlit for some weeks.

== Proposal for closure of system and company transfer ==
South Lancashire Transport Act 1958
- Act of Parliament
- Parliament of the United Kingdom
- Long title: An Act to transfer the undertaking of the South Lancashire Transport Company to Lancashire United Transport Limited to authorise the discontinuance of the service of trolley vehicles authorised under the South Lancashire Transport Acts and Order 1900 to 1948 and for other purposes.
- Citation: 6 & 7 Eliz. 2. c. xxxiii

Dates
- Royal assent: 23 July 1958

Text of statute as originally enacted

A bill to discontinue the use of trolley vehicles in the South Lancashire transport area and to transfer the undertaking of the South Lancashire Transport Company to the Lancashire United Transport Company was considered unopposed in the House of Lords on Wednesday 19 March 1958. It was passed as the South Lancashire Transport Act 1958 (6 & 7 Eliz. 2. c. xxxiii).

=== Reasons for closure ===
The areas through which the SLT trolleybuses travelled were subject to immediate post war industrial decline with associated changes in shift and travelling patterns and consequently passenger loadings. Some of the original 1930 and 1931 vehicles had also been partially rebuilt but this had proved expensive. Apart from the ten 1948 Sunbeam trolleybuses, the fleet was in need of major renewal. Since the nationalisation of electricity generation and supply in 1948, the Howe Bridge power station was mothballed and held in reserve with the company having to buy its electricity supply from NORWEB, part of the newly nationalised electricity supply network.

=== Closure of sections ===
- Atherton to St. Helens 11 November 1956
- Leigh to Bolton 31 August 1958
- Atherton to Farnworth 31 August 1958

==== Personnel ====
Company Director and General Manager South Lancashire Tramways Co. Ltd., and South Lancashire Transport Co. Ltd., and Lancashire United Transport and power Company Ltd., 1911-1955: Mr Edward H Edwardes (18 February 1875 – 5 November 1955)

Mr Edwardes acted as consultant to the City of Hull corporation in 1935 when that city was considering replacing tram routes by trolleybuses.

Mr Edwardes also made design recommendations to Leyland Motors Ltd, Leyland, Lancashire upon the purchase by the South Lancashire Transport Company of some Leyland TTB4 chassis. All his recommendations were accepted by Leyland Motors.

==== Cooperation with other vehicle manufacturers ====
From time to time on the SLT system, new trolleybuses for other UK cities (eg Glasgow) and cities overseas (eg Rangoon) were tested. These tests sometimes included experimental vehicles presenting as a chassis with traction equipment and a rudimentary driving platform but no bodywork. included the experimental and innovative Massey-bodied Leyland trolleybus in 1935 which was years ahead of its time, including as it did low step access, rear entrance and front exit ahead of the front axle, and overall low height but with improved seating.

===== Vehicles by marque and class =====
- 1-10 - Guy BTX L29/31R (1930)
- 11-30 - Guy BTX L29/31R (1931)
- 31-46 - Guy BTX L22/26R (1933)
- 47 - Guy BTX (ex-Guy Motors Demonstrator) (1930)
- 48-59 - Leyland TTB4 (48 to 51 inclusive owned by Bolton Corporation and operated by SLT)(1936 - 1938)
- 60-65 - Karrier W (1943/4)
- 66-71 - Sunbeam MS2 (1948)

===== Other information =====
http://www.lthlibrary.org.uk/library/PDF-015-1.pdf World Survey of Foreign Railways By United States Foreign and Domestic Commerce Bureau Published 31 December 1933

South Lancashire Transport Company. (Controlled by Lancashire United Transport & Power Company, Ltd.) Address: Atherton, Lancashire. Mileage 28 (Trolleybus system). Trolleybuses-102, Capital (stocks and bonds) issued: £754,523. Managing Director: E. H. Edwardes.

== See also ==
- History of Lancashire
- Transport in Lancashire
- List of trolleybus systems in the United Kingdom
