= Registration of Intellectual Property in Ghana =

Registration of intellectual property in Ghana is key to safeguarding one's intellectual efforts from infringement. Intellectual property law of Ghana encompasses intellectual property (IP) laws in Ghana, such as laws governing copyright, patent, trademark, industrial design rights, and unfair competition. The main intellectual property laws in Ghana include the Copyright Act, 2005 (Act 690), the Patents Act, 2003 (Act 657), the Trademarks Act, 2004 (Act 664), the Industrial Designs Act, 2003 (Act 660) and the Protection Against Unfair Competition Act, 2000 (Act 589). These are supplemented by regulations passed by the Legislature to augment the rate of development under IP laws.

== Copyright ==
In Ghana, the creator or author of a work is entitled to the copyright and protection afforded to that work under the Copyright Act. However, in situations where a person is hired specifically for the creation of the work, the one who can claim ownership of the copyright will be the employer. Also, if an author sells out his or her entire Economic Rights (which is usually for a stipulated period of time), then during the time when the license is in force, ownership of copyright is temporarily vested in the licensee (i.e. the one who purchased the license from the original creator).

== Registration ==
For a person to be able to register their Copyright in Ghana, the person must first be a citizen or a person who ordinarily resides in the Republic of Ghana. Also, the work must first be published in the country and where work is first published outside the Republic, it must be subsequently published within the country; between thirty days of its publication outside the Republic ... “irrespective of its artistic quality”. In the case of Shah v Barnet London Borough Council, Lord Scarman defined an ordinary resident as ‘a man's abode in a particular place or country which he has adopted voluntarily and for settled purposes as part of the regular order of his life for the time being, whether of short or long duration’. Moreover, the Act provides for the kind of works which will be eligible for copyright protection such as musical work, sound recording, audiovisual work, choreographic work amongst others.

The Act provides for the registration of a copyright work and section 39(3) is to the effect that, a publisher of a work may submit the work for registration by the Copyright Administrator after it has been published and two copies of the best edition may be deposited at the Copyright Office.

However, it is prominent to note that “Copyright protection of a work is not dependent on the registration of the work”, which means, copyright arises automatically and one need not register his work for copyright protection so long as it is original.

Registration of Copyright provides a primary facie evidence of ownership. Duration of protection lasts for the lifetime of the author plus an additional seventy (70) years after his death. The author can also assign economic rights not moral rights.

General Parties need not register in order to obtain copyright protection for their works, however, parties seeking to enforce their copyright in Ghana may wish to register their works to establish evidence of ownership should enforcement actions be necessary. Right-holders register their copyright with the Copyright Office within the office of the Attorney.

Copyright holders in Ghana enjoy the following exclusive rights:

The right to reproduce the work in any manner or form;

- to translate, adapt, arrange or transform the work in any other way;
- The right to perform the work publicly, communicate it or broadcast it;
- The right to distribute to the public either originals or copies of the work through first sales or other distribution methods; and
- The right to rent to the public originals or copies of the work for commercial gain.

== Law of patent and registration ==
=== Introduction ===
A patent according to section 1 of the Patent Act, is the right to protect an invention. In the Massachusetts Circuit Court ruling in the patent case of Davoll et al. v. Brown, Justice Charles L. Woodbury wrote that "only in this way can we protect intellectual property, the labors of the mind, productions and interests are as much a man's own...as the wheat he cultivates, or the flocks he rears."

=== Application for registration of patent ===
The application for the registration of a patent is required to be filed with the Registrar and should contain a request for the patent, a description of the invention seeking patent protection, and where required, drawings of it. The applicant must pay the prescribed application fee. The request should contain a petition to the effect that a patent be granted, it should also include important details of the applicant, the inventor and the agent, if any, as well as the title of the invention. In circumstances where the applicant is not the inventor, the request shall be submitted with a justification as to the applicant's right to the patent. The description disclosing the invention should be distinct, clear and easily understood, such that a person having ordinary skill in the art is capable of carrying out the invention. It should also indicate at least one mode of carrying out the invention. The essence of a claim in the request is to define the subject matter of the protection. Claims must be clear and concise and supported by the description. Drawings would only be necessary for the understanding of the invention. The applicant may, withdraw the application during the period of wait for the grant of the application.

The application should relate to one invention only or where they are a group of inventions, they must be linked so as to form a single inventive concept. The applicant may opt to amend the application prior to the grant of the right, however, such amendment must not affect the core of the initial disclosure made. The applicant may divide the application into divisional applications but each divisional application is only limited to that before the initial disclosure. Each divisional application shall have a filing date and, where applicable, a priority date. It is noteworthy however, that a patent would not be invalidated because it does not comply with the requirement of unity as in subsection (1) of section 6.

=== Filing date; examination ===
The date of receipt of the application shall be recognised as the filing date if as at the time of receipt, the application contained indications as to the request for a patent grant, indications as to the identity of the applicant and a description of the invention.

The Registrar may request the applicant to make corrections to his application if the requirements are not met. If the application refers to drawings, which are not included in the application, the applicant would be requested to produce those drawings. The Registrar may then assess if the application complies with the requirements of section 5 subsections (1), (2), (3) and (4), and the other requirements indicated as formal requirements and whether information requested under section 8, if any, has been provided. Where the Registrar is satisfied that the application complies with such requirements, the Registrar shall cause the application to be examined as to whether the requirements of sections 1(2) and (3), 2, 3, 5 (5), (6), (7), (8), and 6 have been complied with. The Registrar would however, take in to consideration international reports or findings relating to the application.

=== Grant of patent ===
The Registrar grants the application if the requirements enshrined in sections 9(6) and 9(7) are complied with. He may, however, refuse same if there is non-compliance and notify the applicant of the refusal.

When the patent right is granted, a publication of the reference of the grant to the patent shall be made, and the certificate of the grant of patent, as well as a copy, a record of the patent made available to the public; on payment of the prescribed fee. The Registrar's final decision concerning the application should be made not exceeding two years after his examination. The owner of the patent, may request that changes be made in the text or drawings of the patent in order to limit the extent of the protection. However, no change will be made if the change would result in a disclosure which goes beyond the disclosure contained in the initial application on the basis of which the patent is granted.

== Industrial designs act, 2003 (ACT 660) ==
An industrial design right protects the visual design of objects that are not purely utilitarian. An industrial design consists of the creation of a shape, configuration or composition of pattern or color, or combination of pattern and color in three-dimensional form containing aesthetic value. An industrial design can be a two-or three-dimensional pattern used to produce a product, industrial commodity or handicraft.

=== Process of application for registration ===
An application may be made to the Registrar by an applicant for the registration of an industrial design. The application is subject to some payment fees as prescribed and it shall contain a request, drawings, photographs or any other adequate practice representation of the Industrial design, as well as an indication of which design is to be used. In order to protect the creator or the legitimate person entitled to the registration, the application shall contain a justification of the applicant's right in applying, where he is not the creator. The application may also contain a specimen of the design where the design is two dimensional and evidence of a prior application filed either at national, regional or international levels. Where the Registrar finds that the requirements as under section 5 of Act 660 have not been fulfilled and the regulations pertaining to the declaration as claimed under section 5 (4)(b) are not fulfilled, the declaration shall not be considered to have been made.

It is also noteworthy, that two or more industrial designs may be the subject of the same application if they relate to the same class of International Classification or the same set of articles. The Act does not impede the right of the applicant to withdraw the application during the period of assessing the application. The Registrar subsequently examines the application for any corrections. Opportunity is given for anyone to oppose the application as filed, within a prescribed period and in a prescribed manner on the grounds that the requirements of sections 1 and 2 have not been met or that the applicant does not have the right to register. Opposition is done through a notice to the Registrar. However, the Registrar shall register the Industrial design and publish a reference to the registration and issue to the applicant, a certificate of registration of the Industrial design where the Registrar is satisfied that the requisite requirements have been met and the application has been unopposed, or even if opposed, decided in favour of the applicant. If the Registrar is on the contrary, not satisfied that the Industrial design is registrable, he may refuse the application.

=== The legal effect of registration ===
Registration of the Industrial design grants the person with the registered right, exclusive rights over the design. He has the sole right of granting consent to any entity or person who wants to exploit the registered design. He also has the right to institute court proceedings in addition to other rights and remedies, against anyone who infringes the Industrial design or who is likely to make an infringement occur.

=== Duration of registration ===
The duration of the registration is for a period of five (5) years starting from the filing date of the application for registration The registration may be renewed for two further consecutive periods, subject to the payment of a prescribed fee. A grace period of six months is allowed for the late payment of the renewal fee. A registered owner may surrender the registration through a notification to the Registrar and this comes into effect from the date of record of the surrender. An application may also be made to the Court for the cancellation of the registration.

== The trademarks act, Amendment act 2014 (Act 876) ==
The Trademarks Act is an Act to cater for the protection of trademarks and matters related. Trademarks are signs that are suitable for distinguishing products or services of a particular enterprise from that of other companies. Trademark protection is available for products and services;Unlike patents and copyrights, trademarks do not expire after a set term of years.

=== Registration of trademarks ===
A trademark is subject to registration under section 4 of Act 664. Under section 1 of Act 664, a trademark means a sign or combination of signs including words such as personal names, letters, numerals, and figurative elements. However these signs must be capable of distinguishing the goods or services of one undertaking from the goods or services of any other undertaking. A trademark is subject to registration and such registration confers an exclusive right of use of the trademark on that person.

Under section 4 of Act 644, the application for the registration of the trademark must be filed with the Registrar and is contingent on the payment of a prescribed fee and further must contain a reproduction of the trademark and a list of goods or services for which the registration of the trademark is made.

According to Act 664, the grounds on which an application for registration of a trademark may be refused include; where the trademark is incapable of distinguishing the goods or services of one enterprise from the goods or services of another enterprise; where the trademark is a trade name, or where it is contrary to public order or morality or it is likely to mislead the public or trade circles with particular reference to the geographical origin of the goods or services, their nature or characteristics among others.

Section 6 of Act 664 provides that where the Registrar is satisfied that the application for the registration of the trademark has met all the necessary requirements, the Registrar shall publish it as to enable any persons with oppositions to the application to raise such oppositions on grounds where the application has not satisfied all or part of the necessary requirements.

Where the application has not been opposed within the prescribed time limit or if there were any oppositions, and the matter was granted in favour of the applicant and the Registrar is satisfied that the application has met all necessary requirement, the Registrar shall proceed to register the trademark, publish a reference to the registration and issue the applicant with a certificate of registration.

=== Meaning of collective mark ===
A collective mark is a sign used to distinguish the origin or common characteristics of different enterprises which fall under one registered owner of a sign from other enterprises.

=== Registration of collective mark ===
The registration procedure for collective marks is the same as the registration procedure for trademarks, thus, the Registrar may grant an applicant a registration certificate for a collective mark once he is satisfied that all requirements under sections 4,5, 6 & 7 of Act 664 have been met.

=== Rights conferred by registration ===
Registration of a trademark by a person confers an exclusive right to use the trademark on that person. A person other than a registered owner of a trademark must not knowingly infringe the rights of the owner of a registered trademark by exploiting the trademark without the consent of the owner. if the registered owner is able to prove exploitation of the trademark without his consent, he may institute court action against the offender and such a person may be held to have committed an offence and would be liable on summary conviction to a fine or term of imprisonment or both. Collective Marks also enjoy all the rights as conferred on trademarks per section 8(2) of Act 664.

The duration of the registration of a trademark and collective mark is for ten years and may be renewed for a further period of ten years subject to renewal fees to be paid.

=== Invalidation of trademark and collective mark ===
A trademark already registered may be invalidated where either the registered mark failed to satisfy all or part of the necessary requirements for the mark to be registered or the marks have become a common name to the society. An already registered collective mark may be invalidated on three grounds, namely; where only the registered owner uses the trademark to the exclusion of other enterprises, where the registered owner permits the use of the trademark in contravention of the regulations of the collective mark, or where the registered owner uses or permits the use of the trademark in such a way as will likely to cause confusion in trade circles or the public as to the origin of the goods or services concerned.

=== Trademark registry ===
The Registrar-General, located at the Registrar-General's Department, is responsible for the registration of trademarks and for the administration of registered marks. A person aggrieved by an omission, error or defect with regards to an entry in the register, may file an application with the Registrar for rectification; however such applications shall not be made to affect the validity of the trademarks in the register. The Registrar has the power to correct an error or a mistake in an application or document filed with the Registry, and an entry made under the Act.

== Conclusion ==
From the Copyright Act right through to the Trademarks Act, the importance of registration is evident. Registration of intellectual property rights vests in the registered owner, exclusive rights which can be exercised in a monopolistic way and gives him rights to court action where there are any faults or offenders seeking to disregard the right of the registered owner. Registration of all intellectual property rights is done with the Registrar General and the applicant must go through a host of procedures, necessary in securing a registration.
