= Patents and Designs Act 1907 =

Act of the Parliament of the United Kingdom

Patents and Designs Act 1907 (Note: Section 99.)
- Act of Parliament
- Parliament of the United Kingdom
- Long title: An Act to consolidate the enactments relating to Patents for Inventions and the Registration of Designs and certain enactments relating to Trade Marks.
- Citation: 7 Edw. 7. c. 29
- Territorial extent: United Kingdom

Dates
- Royal assent: 28 August 1907
- Commencement: 1 January 1908

Other legislation
- Amends: See § Repealed enactments
- Repeals/revokes: See § Repealed enactments
- Amended by: Patents and Designs Act 1914; Patents and Designs Act 1919; Patents and Designs (Convention) Act 1928; Patents and Designs Act 1932; Patents, etc. (International Conventions) Act 1938; Patents and Designs (Limits of Time) Act 1939; Patents, Designs, Copyright and Trade Marks (Emergency) Act 1939; Patents and Designs Act 1942; Patents and Designs Act 1946; Patents Act 1949; Registered Designs Act 1949; Minister for the Civil Service Order 1968; Patents Act 1977; National Heritage Act 1983; Statute Law (Repeals) Act 1986; Patents, Designs and Marks Act 1986; Trade Marks Act 1994

Status: Partially repealed

Text of statute as originally enacted

Revised text of statute as amended

Text of the Patents and Designs Act 1907 as in force today (including any amendments) within the United Kingdom, from legislation.gov.uk.

The Patents and Designs Act 1907 (7 Edw. 7. c. 29) is an act of the Parliament of the United Kingdom that consolidated enactments relating to patents for inventions, the registration of designs, and certain enactments relating to trade marks. Its provisions substantively replaced the earlier Patents, Designs, and Trade Marks Act 1883 (46 & 47 Vict. c. 57).

The act was enacted on 31 December 1907, and it aimed to consolidate and amend the laws related to patents and designs in the UK. It laid down provisions related to the grant, registration, and protection of patents and industrial designs. The act encouraged American firms to start manufacturing in the UK by allowing patents to be revoked if they weren't being utilized here.

== Provisions ==
=== Repealed enactments ===
Section 98 of the act repealed 9 enactments, listed in parts I, II and III of the second schedule to the act.

Part I - as from the commencement of the act
| Citation | Short title | Extent of repeal |
|---|---|---|
| 46 & 47 Vict. c. 57 | Patents, Designs, and Trade Marks Act 1883 | The whole act, except subsections (5), (6), (7) of section 26, section 29, subsections (2), (3) of section 47, and section 48. |
| 48 & 49 Vict. c. 63 | Patents, Designs, and Trade Marks (Amendments) Act 1885 | The whole act. |
| 49 & 50 Vict. c. 37 | Patents Act 1886 | The whole act. |
| 51 & 52 Vict. c. 50 | Patents, Designs, and Trade Marks Act 1888 | The whole act. |
| 1 Edw. 7. c. 18 | Patents Act 1901 | The whole act. |
| 2 Edw. 7. c. 34 | Patents Act 1902 | The whole act. |
| 7 Edw. 7. c. 28 | Patents and Designs (Amendment) Act 1907 | The whole act. |

Part II - as from the date when rules of the Supreme Court regulating the matters dealt with in those enactments come into operation
| Citation | Short title | Extent of repeal |
|---|---|---|
| 46 & 47 Vict. c. 57 | Patents, Designs, and Trade Marks Act 1883 | Subsections (5), (6), (7) of section 26 and section 29. |

Part III - as from the date when rules under the act regulating the matters dealt with in those enactments come into operation
| Citation | Short title | Extent of repeal |
|---|---|---|
| 46 & 47 Vict. c. 57 | Patents, Designs, and Trade Marks Act 1883 | Subsections (2), (3) of section 47 and section 48. |

== Subsequent developments ==
Section 82 of the act was repealed by section 1(1) of, and part VI of schedule 1 to, the Statute Law (Repeals) Act 1986, which came into force on 2 May 1986.

== See also ==
- Intellectual property protection of typefaces
- Registration of Intellectual Property in Ghana
- Industrial Designs Act, 2003 (Act 660)
- Outline of intellectual property
