= Industrial Designs Act, 2003 =

Ghanaian law

The Industrial Designs Act, 2003 (Act 660) is a Ghanaian act to revise the enactments on the protection of industrial designs and to provide for related matters. The act is one of the seven acts that exist to protect Intellectual Property Rights in Ghana namely; Protection against Unfair Competition Act, 2000 (Act 589); Industrial Designs Act, 2003 (Act 660); Geographical Indications Act, 2003 (Act 659); Patent Act, 2003 (Act 657); Trademarks Act, 2004 (Act 664); Layout-Designs (Topographies) of Integrated Circuits Act, 2004 (Act 667) and Copyright Act, 2005 (Act 690).

== Purpose ==
Before the coming into force of the Act, the following are reasons the Parliament of Ghana considered to be the purpose of which the Bill should become an Act to cater for industrial designs.

The purpose of the Bill is to enhance the operation of the laws on the protection of industrial designs. This is being effected by expanding the law on the industrial designs to include the accepted international provisions under the TRIPS Agreement. In the course of this, the existing legislation on textile designs have also been revised and incorporated into this Bill.

The definition of an industrial design includes everything which in the appearance of a product, causes an aesthetic impression, in other words, anything which gives an impression received by the sense of sight can be an industrial design. This definition excludes from protection elements in a design which are only for obtaining a technical result and hence cannot be claimed to be as a result of personal creativity. Such elements may be within the domains of Patent Law and outside the protection conferred under Industrial Design Law.

Also, under this Bill, an industrial design is registrable if it is new, it has not been disclosed to the public anywhere in the world and it is not contrary to public order or morality.

Another purpose is to cater for the situation in which two or more persons have created the same industrial design independently of each other, clause 3 applies the first-to-file system to determine who has the right to the registration of an industrial design.

The Industrial Designs Act was enacted by the Parliament of Ghana and came into force on 31 December 2003 after receiving Presidential assent and fully named, INDUSTRIAL DESIGNS ACT, 2003 (ACT 660) to cater for issues surrounding Industrial Designs in Ghana. The Act was expressed as an act to revise the enactments on the protection of industrial designs and to provide for related matters. Before the birth of the Act, there was the United Kingdom Designs (protection) ordinance (Cap 182) and also the Textiles Designs (Registration) Decree, 1973 (N.R.C.D. 213), the decree provided for the registration and protection of textile design and is presently the law regulating the registration and protection of textile designs in Ghana.

== Structure ==
The Act comprises 27 sections and is categorized into the following headings:

Headings	Sections	Summaries of the Sections
Definition	1	Industrial Design is; Lines or colors or textile design which gives special appearance to an industry product.; Textile Design – a product of industry or handicraft and can serve as a pattern for a product of industry or handicraft
Registrable Industrial Design	2	It is registrable if it is; New; Differ from other designs.; Discusses what does not amount to disclosure.
Right to Registration	3	Right to register lies with; The creator of the design; Joint creators of a Design; Employer; Priority date – first to file has the right to register Assignments, Transfers and Succession
Naming of the creator	4	Creator of the design shall be named unless otherwise stated by the creator.
Application for registration	5	Talks about steps to apply for registration: Persons or States may apply; Payment of prescribed fees; Request of autograph of design and instruction on use of design; Application must be sent to the Registrar; Application may be withdrawn
Examination	6	Registrar must: Record filing; Examine whether it is complies with the Act
Opposition to registration	7	Any person may give notice of defect in registration requirements within prescribed period to Registrar. Registrar shall: Furnish a copy of notice to Applicant; Furnish the counter statement to Opposition if there any; Hear either or both sides of the matter and conclude whether the Design is registrable or not
Registration and publication	8	In the absence of any notice and fulfillment of registration requirements the Registrar may issue a certificate of registration and publish a reference to the registration. Application shall be refused if Registrar is satisfied that it is not registrable
Rights of Registration	9	Exploitation of design.(Making Profit); Action against anyone who infringes this right
Duration and Renewal of registration	10	Registration is valid for 5 years; Renewable twice for a period of 5 years each upon payment of prescribed fee
Surrender of registration	11	Creator may surrender: By written declaration to the registrar; Effective from the date on which it was recorded
Cancellation of registration	12	An interested person may submit to the Court to cancel a registration if: The requirement under sections 1 & 2 has not being fulfilled; The registered owner is not the creator or successor in title; Cancelled registration is void from the date of registration and Registrar shall record or publish it
Change in Ownership	13	Changes in ownership of an industrial design shall be submitted to the registrar in writing.; Approval of changes must be published by the registrar; Changes affects no third parties until it has been recorded and published
License Contracts	14	License contracts covering registered designs or applications for design must be submitted to the registrar who is to keep the contents confidential but must record and publish a reference to it; Such contracts are not binding on third parties unless recorded and published
Registrar	15	Duties relating to the procedure of registration of industrial designs and administration of registered industrial designs
Register	16	Contains all recorded matters in relation to this Act; Persons can consult or have access to it
Correction of Errors	17	Filed Applications or Documents with errors may be rectified by the Registrar
Extension of Time	18	Registrar may extend the time for doing any act under this Act if he is satisfied that the circumstances justify it upon receiving a written notice
Exercise of Discretionary Powers	19	Registrar, in exercising Discretionary Powers conferred on it must be in conformity with Article 296 of the Constitution
Representation	20	If the Applicant if a natural or legal person outside the country, he/it shall be represented by a legal practitioner resident and practicing inside the country
Appeals	21	An interested person not satisfied with the decision of the Registrar may appeal to the Court
Infringement and Offences	22	Any person who performs the right under section 9 other than the registered owner without consent, constitutes an infringement. Upon application by the registered owner or licensee, the Court may: Grant an injunction; Award damages; Grant any other remedy; The person who knowingly infringes commits an offence and is liable to: A summary conviction to a fine not more than 2000 penalty units or; Imprisonment not exceeding 2 years or; Both
Application of International Treaties	23	Where the Applicant is a country, when there is conflict of laws between this Act and an International Treaty, the International Treaty shall prevail
Harare Protocol	24	A protocol Ghana has incorporated into its legislation
Regulations	25	Regulations are to be made by LIs by the Minister for the effective implementation of this Act
Interpretations	26	Please refer below (key terms)
Repeals and Savings	27	Repealed laws; Until revoked, subsidiary laws under the Repealed laws will still be in force

== Objectives ==
The industrial Designs Act has its main objective stated in the preamble of the Act. It seems to revise the enactments on Industrial Designs and to provide for related matters. Sections 1 (a) (b) & 2 define what an Industrial Design is and what forms an Industrial Design may take.

The Act defines an Industrial Design as a composition of lines or colors, any three-dimensional form or any material, whether or not associated with lines or colors. A textile design is also considered as industrial designs where the composition, form or material gives a special appearance to a product of industry or handicraft and can serve as a pattern for a product of industry or handicraft.

In essence, it limits the scope of applicability to designs that impact the aesthetic character of the industrial product. Though the Industrial Design Act is not express on the fact that, protection of Industrial Design in Ghana is contingent upon registration that can be inferred from the Act, however a greater part of the sections of the Act deals with the issue of Registration of Industrial Designs by creators. Industrial Designs are nonetheless registered if they are original or significantly different from known designs.

Section (2) provides for designs which do not fall under the requirement of Industrial Acts in Ghana. The protection under Act 660 is not applicable to anything in an industrial design which serves solely to obtain a technical result to the extent that it leaves no freedom as regards arbitrary features of appearance.

== Key terms ==
Key terms in the Act are defined in the Interpretation Section of the Act.

Section 26 provides unless the context otherwise requires the following definitions to the known terms;

Court means the High Court;

Creator means the person who creates the industrial design; "Harare Protocol" means the Protocol on Patents and Industrial Designs adopted in 1982 in Harare, Zimbabwe and ratified by the Government of Ghana on 20 September 1983;

International Classification means the classification according to the Locarno Treaties of 8 October 1968 establishing an International Classification for Industrial Designs;

Minister means the Minister responsible for Justice;

Paris Convention means the Paris Convention for the Protection of Industrial Property of 20 March 1883, as revised;

Priority Date means the date of the earlier application that serves as the basis for the right of priority provided for in the Paris Convention;

Register means the Register of Industrial Designs;

Registered owner means the registered owner of an industrial design;

Registrar means the Registrar‐General.

== Application ==
The Act is applicable where,

- An industrial design does not solely serve to obtain a technical result to the extent that it leaves no freedom as regards arbitrary features of appearance.
- Any international treaty in respect of industrial property to which the country is a party in matters dealt with by this Act.
- The industrial design is made within the country. The protection provided under the Act is limited to the country because the Industrial Design rights are territorial in nature.
- A composition of lines or colours, any three dimensions form or any material whether or not associated with lines of colours falls within the context of textile design.

== Emerging law to protect industrial designs ==
The Industrial Design Act fundamentally seeks to protect the unique creations of persons that falls within the ambit of Section 1 of Act 660. Also, it seeks to grant to the creator of designs to reward them for their effort and investment in manufacturing the product and does not protect any technical features of the object to which it is applied.

Protecting an industrial design is also a reward for creativity and encourages economic development.

Above all, it ensures protection against unauthorised copying or imitation of the design and can be relatively simple and inexpensive to develop. It also serves as the legal basis to help stop counterfeit products from destroying the legitimate brand's market and defaulting on the legitimate brand's visual promise of efficacy and safety, realising that most design laws in existence provide a relatively narrow scope of protection beyond which is depicted in the drawings forming the basis of the design application, it is recommended that protection for embodiment similar in appearance, but outside the halo of equivalent be filed and legislated. Consumers often take the visual appeal of a product into consideration when choosing between different products. This is especially true when the market offers a large variety of products with exactly the same function. As the aesthetic appeal of a product can determine the consumer's choice an industrial design adds commercial value to a product.

The Daily Graphic on 19 July 2016 reported through its reputation Suleiman Mustapha that "employers wage war on stolen designs and seek justice" this is a case where Ghana Employers Association (GEA) has called for stiffer punishment for pirates of stolen industrial design to save the country's industrial sector from collapsing, rising concerns of stolen industrial design of textile and manufacturing companies to the pirating of counterfeit pharmaceutical products have forced employers to call for a review of the existing law to save the country's thriving industrial sector from crumpling.

Lastly, one of the reasons for the emerging the laws surrounding industrial design is basically, Globalisation. On 21 January 2016, Ghana launched its National Intellectual Property Policy and strategy (NIPPS). The vision is for Ghana to be amongst the leading countries in the utilization of Intellectual Property as a tool for rapid national development. The mission is to contribute towards enhancing the competitiveness of Ghana by improving and increasing the use of intellectual property systems. NIPPS long term goal is to exploit intellectual property rights for accelerated growth in technological and industrial development in Ghana.

== Industrial designs register ==
The Register contains all recorded matters required by this Act to be recorded and it is maintained by the Registrar. The Register may be consulted by any person and extracts from the Register may be obtained subject to the prescribed conditions. The Registrar shall publish in the prescribed manner all the publications provided for under this Act.

== Exemptions ==
The protection under this Act is not applicable to anything in an industrial design which serves solely to obtain a technical result to the extent that it leaves no freedom as regards arbitrary features of appearance – Section 1(2)

An industrial design which is contrary to public order or public morality is not registrable – Section 2(4)

The rights conferred by registration are not applicable to acts in respect of articles which have been put on the market in any country by the registered owner or with the registered owner's consent – Section 9(3)

A licence contract is of no legal effect against third parties until it has been recorded in accordance with this section (Section 14) – Section 14(2)

== Other provisions ==
The creator shall be named the creator in the registration of the industrial design unless the creator indicates in a special written declaration signed by the creator and addressed to the Registrar that the creator does not wish to be named. A promise or an undertaking by the creator made to any person to the effect that the creator will make a declaration referred to in subsection (1) is void. – Section 4

Where the Registrar is satisfied that the industrial design is not registrable the Registrar shall refuse the application. – Section 8(2)

The exploitation of a registered industrial design by persons other than the registered owner shall require the consent of the owner. – Section 9(1)

== Implementation ==
Although the Industrial Designs Act, 2003 (ACT 660) has been in force up to date, it is still in the development stage and has yet to fully develop. Although Ghana has the ACT 660, the implementing regulations have not yet passed. Accordingly, currently the Registry only accepts and processes applications relating to textiles designs. All other designs are not registrable in Ghana by way of national filings pending the implementations of regulations. Although Ghana has acceded to the Hague Agreement Concerning the International Deposit of Industrial Designs, ACT 660 does not provide for the implementation of the Hague registration system, so the position in regard to such registration is not clear.
