= Nana Adjoa Adobea Asante =

Ghanaian lawyer

- Education: Kwame Nkrumah University of Science and Technology Ghana School of Law University of Milan
- Occupations: Lawyer, Acting Director of the Nation Folklore Board, Founding Director of Social Bridge

Nana Adjoa Adobea Asante is a former acting director of the National Folklore Board and was at that time one of the youngest government agency heads in Ghana.

== Education ==
Asante studied law at the Kwame Nkrumah University of Science and Technology and proceeded to obtain her professional law degree at the Ghana School of Law. She has certificates in Sustainable dispute resolution and International anti-corruption from the University of Milan. She is currently pursuing a master's degree in Gender, Peace and Security at the Kofi Annan International Peacekeeping Centre, Accra.

== Career ==
Asante is a lawyer, with expertise in the areas of commercial litigation, corporate governance and intellectual property. She is the Founding Director of The Social Bridge, an NGO which seeks to empower women and children living on the streets through education and as well as projects to improve their livelihood.

Asante has worked with laws firms both in Ghana and abroad including Scarlet Macaw Legal Practitioners, JLD & MB Legal Consultancy, and secondment to Fresh Fields Bruckhaus Derringer and NCTM Milan.

In 2017, she was one of two female lawyers selected by the Association of Law Firms in Italy to participate in a six-month professional development program, where she took courses in Sustainable Dispute Resolution and Sustainable Development & International Anti- Corruption.

Asante has also represented Ghana at the WIPO Intergovernmental meeting on traditional knowledge and traditional cultural expressions (folklore). Under her leadership, the National Folklore Board (NFB) has helped to the promote and protect Ghanaian folklore. In 2019, for the first time, Ghana celebrated the World Folklore Day, marking it with a three-day programme. As part of the plan to introduce Ghanaian folklore to the youth, the NFB also launched its folklore clubs in 2019.

Adjoa is a member of the Heritage Fund Committee.

== Achievements ==
Instrumental in the set-up of Creative Arts Rights Court and assisted in drafting a Memorandum to Creative Arts Bill.

Facilitation of UNESCO Needs Assessment of Ghana's Intangible Cultural Heritage Project

Secured NFB to be the focal institution for 2003 UNESCO Convention

Identifying/ licensing commercial users of Ghana's folklore

Establishment of Folklore Clubs in selected basic schools

Protection of Ghana's folklore from improper use (including correspondence with Marvel Studios on use of Kente and Adinkra symbols in the film Black Panther.)

Institution of the celebration of World Folklore Day in Ghana.
