= Paul Oliver v. Samuel K. Boateng =

Copyright case

Paul Oliver v Samuel K. Boateng
- Coat of Arms of the Republic of Ghana
- Court: High Court of Ghana
- Full case name: Paul Oliver vrs Samuel K. Boateng and Victor Gbehodor
- Decided: 22 May 2012
- Citation: Suit No. RPC/208/11

Case opinions
- Decision by: Justice Gertrude Torkornoo

Keywords
- Ghana Copyright

Paul Oliver v. Samuel K. Boateng was a ground-breaking case concerning copyright law in Ghana by the High Court of Justice. It reaffirmed the laws of Copyright relating to the requirements of copyright protection and the law relating to authorship in Ghana. This case elaborated the fact that the law of Copyright in Ghana is a creature of Statute and set out some major general principles in Copyright Law in Ghana.

The case involved Mr. Paul Oliver, a programmer, who claimed ownership of Copyright in two versions of a Rural Banking software called Rural Banker and E- finance. Paul Oliver sued Samuel Boateng and the second defendant Victor Gbehodor for licensing his software to other rural banks without his permission.

The court in this case, relying heavily on Statute (in this case, the Copyright Act of 2005), emphasized how statute dependent the Law of Copyright in Ghana is. The case also made reference to the various subject matter that are not Copyright-able in Ghana throwing a specific light on Ideas. It made it clear that a person who expresses the idea in a concrete form will be the Author of a work. Also, this case made some decisions regarding may be referred to as a joint Author and also threw some light on Infringement of Copyright, Damages and also highlighted the existence of idea/expression merger scenarios.

== Facts ==
The plaintiff, Paul Oliver, worked for Ananse Systems, where he created the first two versions of a Banking software alongside an ex-Banker, Samuel K. Boateng who was also engaged with Ananse systems. The plaintiff went to the U.K and released the third version of the Banking software called The Rural Banker, a comprehensive banking system fully integrated into an accounting software he had also developed which was later succeeded by a 4th version called E- finance. The plaintiff met the 1st defendant again, who at that time had left Ananse systems to try market the new version of the banking software that he had created. The 1st defendant registered a business under the name BSL Systems for that exact purpose. The parties subsequently fell out with each other and a dispute arose.

The major part of departure and which was the fulcrum of the case was the authorship and ownership of the copyrights in the last two versions (4th and 3rd versions) of the banking software. The plaintiff contended that the agreement that existed between them entailed the 1st defendant would market the software and the 1st defendant will in turn, license the software to the banks. This was the same arrangement he had with Ananse Systems. The plaintiff also claimed that he issued invoices to the defendants which the defendants sent him money as license fee in return and the defendants transferred the money because they acknowledged that he was the sole author.

The defendants countered by claiming that the plaintiff had never been the sole author of the rural banking software in its various versions and that the 1st defendant pleaded that even when he was engaged in Ananse Systems, he was there, "with a view of developing the Rural Banking Software" because he was a professional Banker with vast working experience. Therefore, it was his ideas which constituted he substructure for the Banking Software created by the plaintiff and that the plaintiff contributed only to the software by designing the software at the direction of the 1st defendant and just provided the source and object codes for this software.

The defendants therefore claimed that both the Rural Banker and E- finance were jointly authored by the plaintiff and the defendants after the formation of BSL Systems, only sent the plaintiff money dubbed "licensing fee" because of Bank of Ghana regulations. They subsequently transferred the money because the plaintiff retained the activation codes of the software and used it as a bargaining chip to compel the first defendant to pay him balances after the deduction of overhead cost. The defendants continued to distribute the software without his permission after their relationship got terminated and the plaintiff's first head of claim was a demand for outstanding license fee for distribution of the software without consent and for infringement of copyright.

== Judgement ==
The court ultimately held that the plaintiff was the sole author of the rural Banker and e-Finance software and that the defendant's use and licensing of these software without his permission following the termination of their partnership amounted to an infringement of the plaintiff's copyright. The Court again cited the copyright Act and emphasized the fact that the author of a work has exclusive right in respect of the work and that the copy right in that work should not be contested. The court granted the plaintiff money for unpaid bills and granted the plaintiffs damages for infringement and stated that the defendants should reinstate the plaintiff by disgorging all the income they enjoyed from licensing the plaintiff's software from the date of infringement.

== Significance ==
=== Who is an Author? ===
The case in its proceedings stated the definition of an author and highlighted who an Author was. Justice Gertrude Torkornoo stated, "it is the creator of copyrighted material who qualifies to be the and identified as an author with protected rights"

=== Joint Authorship ===
The case mentioned that copyright is only granted to the authors of a work and also gave the definition of joint Authorship as follows, "a work created by two or more Authors in collaboration, in which individual contributions are indistinguishable from each other". This case therefore, sets the requirements of Joint Authorship in Ghana which include, independent contribution, Collaboration by authors claiming joint authorship and that their contributions should be indistinguishable. The court in this case, went on to say that in order to satisfy these requirements set in Section 77 of Act 690, a person claiming joint authorship should be able to again satisfy 3 proper questions. Firstly, did each claimant contribute directly to the creation of the work? Followed by, was there a mutual intention of two parties to joint author the work? And finally, is their individual work so woven into a whole that the work would lack the current identity if one person's contribution is taken out? If all the questions can be answered positively, two parties can then successfully claim joint authorship.

=== Copyright and ideas ===
The case stated in it that one of the fundamental principles of copyright law in Ghana is that ideas, concepts, methods, procedures or things of similar nature cannot be copyrighted. This statement is reaffirmed in section 2 of the Copyrights Act which states that, "Copyright shall not extend to ideas, concepts, procedures, methods or other things of a similar nature." Thus, the statement of the 1st defendant that he jointly authored the software because he jointly provided the ideas used in creating it does not make him a joint author. Justice Gertrude Torkornoo then stated that, "the one who provides the idea does not walk in the same shoes as the one who expresses the idea".

These points emphasise the fact that only the person who expresses an idea in a concrete form is entitled to copyright hence the judge's statement, "...no matter how brilliant the outline of ideas generated by anyone, it is not till those ideas are expressed in a particular concrete form that copyright law may be invoked, and it is only the person who expressed those ideas in the particular concrete form that is identified as the author of the expression"

=== Originality ===
Originality was mentioned slightly in this case. This supported the provisions in Section 2 of the Copyright Act, 2005. In order for a work to enjoy copyright, the skill, labour and Judgement required for creating the copyrighted expression must be original and further asserts that the word "original", does not mean new or novel but that the creative work must originate from the author.

=== Idea/expression Merger ===
The court referred to the case of Baker V Selden which saw the United States Supreme Court hold that in situations where an idea merges with its expression such that the idea can only be expressed in only one form and that the idea cannot be expressed in any other form but that form, the law will still not give copyright to the originator of the work.

=== Infringement ===
Infringement as seen in Section 41 of the Copyright Act is also elaborated in this case. Section 41 made it clear that nobody is permitted to perform acts contrary to the rights of an Author. The defendant in this case, by licensing the plaintiff's software to Rural Banks following the plaintiff's termination of his partnership with them without his permission amounted to acts contrary to the rights of the plaintiff and this therefore, constituted an infringement. This case therefore highlights a major way by which an author's copyright may be infringed.

=== Damages ===
Damages are normally awarded as compensation for an infringement of copyright. This above point was showcased in this case when Justice Gertrude Torkorno said that the court must consider damages after infringement had been found. The damages however, must be fair and reasonably when she again stated that, "the damages which the other party ought to receive in respect of such breach of contract should be such as may fairly and reasonably be considered as either arising naturally."

=== Essence of Accounts ===
This case also supports the fact courts will usually order a defendant to submit his accounts to determine damages. Justice Gertrude Torkorno ordered Boateng to submit a list," of all persons to whom they have licensed the plaintiff's software Rural Banker and e-finance since April 2011 when plaintiff severed his relationship with them. They are further to file an account of monies received from every entity they have licensed the software to since April 2011 ". This is done in case the sum gained by the defendant is higher than the damages awarded to the plaintiff.

=== Injunction ===
An injunction was placed on the defendants, their representatives, agents and assigns. They were perpetually restrained from dealing with, representing themselves as authors and or persons with authority to license, market or distribute the plaintiff's software. Injunctions serve as one of the civil remedies available to a copyright owner to protect his interests from further exploitation. This suit therefore exhibited the existence of injunctions as a way further protecting the economic rights of an author.
