= Pearson Education Limited v Morgan Adzei =

Copyright case

Pearson Education Limited v Morgan Adzei is one of the novel Ghanaian cases that discusses the extent of application and protection under the Copyright Act of Ghana, Act 690. The primary focus of this case is on the works excluded from copyright eligibility under section 2 of the Copyright Act, Act 690.

== Facts ==
The respondent, who was the plaintiff in the trial court, is the one who wrote the novel Woes of the African Mother, which was first published in August 1982. This novel was then selected by the West African Examination Council as one of the prescribed texts for prose in the English Language paper for the academic years 2004 to 2006 for the Basic Education Certificate Examination for junior high schools in Ghana. The respondent, in his action, claimed that, following a meeting of the Directors of the Ghana Education Service on the literature component of the Basic School English Language examination, it was decided that Junior Secondary School I pupils should be examined for prose in, the respondent's novel. A recommendation was therefore made that 450,000 copies of respondent's novel at a unit cost of 20,000 Cedis be ordered. The appellant, the publisher of a work titled Gateway to English for Junior Secondary Schools Pupil’s Book 3 included, as Appendix 6, a summary of the respondent's novel which caused the respondent to be aggrieved as the act of the appellant caused him to lose a substantial amount of money.

== Issue ==
Whether or not there was copyright infringement by the publishers of Gateway.

== Rule ==
Copyright protection does not extend to ideas, concepts, procedures, methods or other things of a similar nature.

== Application ==
It has been considered an axiom of copyright law, as applied in the United Kingdom of Great Britain and Northern Ireland and many other jurisdictions, that copyright protects the expression of an idea, rather than the idea itself. This at any rate is clear beyond all question, that there is no copyright in an idea, or in ideas. A person may have a brilliant idea for a story, or for a picture, or for a play, and one which appears to him to be original but if he communicates that idea to an author or an artist or a playwright, the production which is the result of the communication of the idea to the author or the artist or the playwright is the copyright of the person who has clothed the idea in form, whether by means of a picture, a play, or a book, and the owner of the idea has no rights in that product. Similarly, Copyright does not extend to ideas, or schemes, or systems or methods. It is confined to their expression and if their expression is not copied the copyright is not infringed. Ghanaian law, as usual, has been influenced by this English law. Accordingly, the appellant has endeavoured to construct a case based on this axiom of English and Ghanaian law.

== Submissions ==
Both parties offered compelling arguments with respect to the extent of Copyright application in Ghana.

=== Applicant's Submission ===
The appellant submits that the judgment of the trial court failed to address the import of the provision in section 2 of Act 690 that copyright does not extend to ideas, and that the Court of Appeal erred in not setting aside the judgment on that ground. The plot of a novel, such as Woes, was an idea that had no copyright protection under Act 690. Therefore, the Summary could not constitute copyright infringement especially when it was neither alleged nor established that the Summary had plagiarized the plaintiff's linguistic style or presentation. The appellant argues that the Summary, published purposely for education, did not infringe the plaintiff's copyright in Woes.

The appellant goes on to cite in support of his argument, ideas versus expression. In dealing with the question of copying, there should be borne in mind the well established principle that there is no copyright in mere ideas, concepts, schemes, systems or methods. Rather, the object of copyright is to prevent the copying of the particular form of expression in which these things are conveyed. If the expression is not copied, copyright is not infringed. Thus to be liable, the defendant must have made a substantial use of the form of expression; he is not liable if he has taken from the work the essential idea, for his own purposes. Protection of this kind can only be obtained, if at all, under patent law or the law relating to confidential information. This principle finds expression in many of the cases, to the effect, for example, that it is no infringement of the copyright on a literary or dramatic work to take its basic idea or plot...”

=== Respondent's Submission ===
The Summary was a substantial reproduction of Woes, particularized as general similarity of the plot characterization and incidents in the two works and upon the similarity or identity of the words and phrases. The main issue that fell for decision was whether Gateway merely summarized the plot of Woes or, whether in doing so, it plagiarized the literary presentation in Woes. Obviously the plaintiff did not establish the alleged similarity or identity of the words and phrases” because there was none. The grievance of general similarity of the plot characterization and incidents in the two works” also overlooked the position that there is no copyright in ideas. No copyright in ideas. "Copyright is a property right. But copyright is concerned, in essence, with the negative right of preventing the copying of material. It is not concerned with the reproduction of ideas but with the reproduction of the form in which ideas are expressed. “Ideas, it has always been admitted…are free as air. Copyright is not a monopoly, unlike patents and registered designs, which are…The position is that, if the idea embodied in the plaintiff’s work is sufficiently general, the mere taking of that idea will not infringe. If, however, the idea is worked out in some detail in the plaintiff’s work and the defendant reproduces the expression of that idea, then there may be an infringement”.

== Holding ==
1. What was replicated in the Summary was only the general idea of the novel, which in terms of section 2 of the Act is excluded from copyright protection.
2. The Court of Appeal was in error in failing to advert to this question of law.
3. This appeal succeeds and the judgments of the courts below should be set aside.

== Judgement ==
Since section 2 of the Copyright Act, has specifically excluded ideas, concepts among others from Copyright, the fundamental and core issue which a court engaged in a copyright case has to consider is whether the works alleged to be in breach of the Copyright Act, are not excepted under section 2 of the Act. Since the plaintiff has failed to clear that initial hurdle, the appeal herein succeeds.
