= Patents, Designs, and Trade Marks Act 1883 =

Act of the Parliament of the United Kingdom

Patents, Designs, and Trade Marks Act 1883 (Note: Section 1.)
- Act of Parliament
- Parliament of the United Kingdom
- Long title: An Act to amend and consolidate the Law relating to Patents for Inventions, Registration of Designs, and of Trade Marks.
- Citation: 46 & 47 Vict. c. 57
- Introduced by: Joseph Chamberlain MP (Commons)
- Territorial extent: United Kingdom

Dates
- Royal assent: 25 August 1883
- Commencement: 1 January 1884 (Note: Section 3.)
- Repealed: 1 January 1908
Other legislation
Amends	See § Repealed enactments
Repeals/revokes	See § Repealed enactments
Amended by	Patents, Designs, and Trade Marks (Amendment) Act 1885; Patents Act 1886; Patents, Designs, and Trade Marks Act 1888; Patents Act 1901; Patents Act 1902; Patents and Designs (Amendment) Act 1907
Repealed by	Patents and Designs Act 1907

Status: Repealed

History of passage through Parliament

Records of Parliamentary debate relating to the statute from Hansard

Text of statute as originally enacted

The Patents, Designs, and Trade Marks Act 1883 (46 & 47 Vict. c. 57) was an act of the Parliament of the United Kingdom that consolidated enactments relating to patents in the United Kingdom.

== Passage ==
Leave to bring in the Patents for Inventions Bill to the House of Commons was granted to Joseph Chamberlain MP, the Solicitor General, Sir Farrer Herschell MP, and John Clough Holmes MP on 17 February 1883. The bill had its first reading in the House of Commons on 17 February 1883, presented by Joseph Chamberlain MP. The bill had its second reading in the House of Commons on 17 April 1883 and was committed to the Standing Committee on Trade, Shipping, and Manufactures, which reported on 9 July 1888, with amendments. The amended bill was considered on 4 August 1883, with amendments and had its third reading in the House of Commons on 4 August 1883and passed, without amendments.

The bill had its first reading in the House of Lords on 6 August 1883. The bill had its second reading in the House of Lords on 9 August 1883 and was committed to a committee of the whole house, which met on 16 August 1883 and 20 August 1883 and reported on 20 August 1883, with amendments. The amended bill had its third reading in the House of Lords on 21 August 1883 and passed, with amendments.

The amended bill was considered on 22 August 1883 and 23 August 1883 and agreed to by the House of Commons on 23 August 1883.

The bill was granted royal assent on 25 August 1883.

== Provisions ==
=== Repealed enactments ===
Section 113 of the act repealed 23 enactments, listed in the third schedule to the act. Section 113 of the act provided that the repeals would not affect past operation of the repealed enactments or any patents, copyrights or trademarks granted or applied for under those enactments, as well as any legal proceedings made under them.

Citation	Short Title	Title	Extent of repeal
21 James 1. c. 3	Statute of Monopolies	The Statute of Monopolies.	Sections ten, eleven, and twelve.
5 & 6 Will. 4. c. 62	Statutory Declarations Act 1835	The Statutory Declarations Act, 1835.	Section eleven.
5 & 6 Will. 4. c. 83	Letters Patent for Inventions Act 1835	An Act to amend the law touching letters patent for inventions.	The whole act.
2 & 3 Vict. c. 67	Patents Act 1839	An Act to amend an Act of the fifth and sixth years of the reign of King William the Fourth, intituled "An Act to amend the law touching letters patent for inventions."	The whole act.
5 & 6 Vict. c. 100	Copyright of Designs Act 1842	An Act to consolidate and amend the laws relating to the copyright of designs for ornamenting articles of manufacture.	The whole act.
6 & 7 Vict. c. 65	Copyright of Designs Act 1843	An Act to amend the laws relating to the copyright of designs.	The whole act.
7 & 8 Vict. c. 69	Judicial Committee Act 1844	An Act for amending an Act passed in the fourth year of the reign of His late Majesty, intituled "An Act for the better administration of justice in His Majesty's Privy Council, and to extend its jurisdiction and powers."	Sections two to five, both included.
13 & 14 Vict. c. 104	Copyright of Designs Act 1850	An Act to extend and amend the Acts relating to the copyright of designs.	The whole act.
15 & 16 Vict. c. 83	Patent Law Amendment Act 1852	The Patent Law Amendment Act, 1852.	The whole act.
16 & 17 Vict. c. 5	Patent Law Act 1853	An Act to substitute stamp duties for fees on passing letters patent for inventions, and to provide for the public use of certain indexes of specifications.	The whole act.
16 & 17 Vict. c. 115	Patent Law (No. 2) Act 1853	An Act to amend certain provisions of the Patent Law Amendment Act, 1852, in respect of the transmission of certified copies of letters patent and specifications to certain offices in Edinburgh and Dublin, and otherwise to amend the said Act.	The whole act.
21 & 22 Vict. c. 70	Copyright of Designs Act 1858	An Act to amend the Act of the fifth and sixth years of the present Majesty, to consolidate and amend the laws relating to the copyright of designs for ornamenting articles of manufacture.	The whole act.
22 Vict. c. 13	Patents for Inventions Act 1859	An Act to amend the law concerning patents for inventions with respect to inventions for improvements in instruments and munitions of war.	The whole act.
24 & 25 Vict. c. 73	Copyright of Designs Act 1861	An Act to amend the law relating to the copyright of designs.	The whole act.
28 & 29 Vict. c. 3	Industrial Exhibitions Act 1865	The Industrial Exhibitions Act, 1865.	The whole act.
33 & 34 Vict. c. 27	Protection of Inventions Act 1870	The Protection of Inventions Act, 1870.	The whole act.
33 & 34 Vict. c. 97	Stamp Act 1870	The Stamp Act, 1870.	Section sixty-five, and in the Schedule the words and figures "Certificate of registration of a design . . . £5 0 0" and the words "design 65."
38 & 39 Vict. c. 91	Trade Marks Registration Act 1875	The Trade Marks Registration Act, 1875.	The whole act.
38 & 39 Vict. c. 93	Copyright of Designs Act 1875	The Copyright of Designs Act, 1875.	The whole act.
39 & 40 Vict. c. 33	Trade Marks Registration Amendment Act 1876	The Trade Marks Registration Amendment Act, 1876.	The whole act.
40 & 41 Vict. c. 37	Trade Marks Registration Extension Act 1877	The Trade Marks Registration Extension Act, 1877.	The whole act. (Note: This act was repealed by the Statute Law Revision Act 1883 (46 & 47 Vict. c. 39) which was also granted royal assent on 25 August 1883.)
43 & 44 Vict. c. 10	Great Seal Act 1880	The Great Seal Act, 1880.	Section five.
45 & 46 Vict. c. 72	Revenue, Friendly Societies, and National Debt Act 1882	The Revenue, Friendly Societies, and National Debt Act, 1882.	Section sixteen.

== Subsequent developments ==
The act was described as a consolidation act.

The whole act was repealed by section 98(1) of, and the second schedule to, the Patents and Designs Act 1907 (7 Edw. 7. c. 29), which came into force on 1 January 1908.
