= Copyright of Designs Act 1842 =

Act of the Parliament of the United Kingdom

- Act of Parliament
- Parliament of the United Kingdom
- Long title: An Act to consolidate and amend the Laws relating to the Copyright of Designs for ornamenting Articles of Manufacture.
- Citation: 5 & 6 Vict. c. 100
- Territorial extent: United Kingdom

Dates
- Royal assent: 10 August 1842
- Commencement: 1 September 1842 (Note: Section 1.)
- Repealed: 1 January 1884

Other legislation
- Amends: See § Repealed enactments
- Repeals/revokes: See § Repealed enactments
- Amended by: Copyright of Designs Act 1843; Copyright of Designs Act 1850; Copyright of Designs Act 1858; Copyright of Designs Act 1861; Copyright of Designs Act 1875
- Repealed by: Patents, Designs, and Trade Marks Act 1883

Status: Repealed

Text of statute as originally enacted

The Copyright of Designs Act 1842 (5 & 6 Vict. c. 100) was an act of the Parliament of the United Kingdom that consolidated and amended enactments relating to the copyright of designs for ornamenting articles of manufacture in the United Kingdom.

== Provisions ==
=== Repealed enactments ===
Section 1 of the act repealed 5 enactments, listed in schedules A and B to the act.

==== Schedule A ====
Schedule A
Citation	Short title	Description	Extent of repeal
27 Geo. 3. c. 38	Designing and Printing of Linens, etc. Act 1787	An Act for the Encouragement of the Arts of designing and printing Linens, Cottons, Calicoes, and Muslins, by vesting the Properties thereof in the Designers, Printers, and Proprietors for a limited Time.	The whole act.
29 Geo. 3. c. 19	Designing and Printing of Linens, etc. Act 1789	An Act for continuing an Act for the Encouragement of the Arts of designing and printing Linens, Cottons, Calicoes, and Muslins, by vesting the Properties thereof in the Designers, Printers, and Proprietors for a limited Time.	The whole act.
34 Geo. 3. c. 23	Linens, etc. Act 1794	An Act for amending and making perpetual an Act for the Encouragement of the Arts of designing and printing Linens, Cottons, Calicoes, and Muslins, by vesting the Properties thereof in the Designers, Printers, and Proprietors for a limited Time.	The whole act.
2 & 3 Vict. c. 13	Copyright of Designs (Printed Fabrics) Act 1839	An Act for extending the Copyright of Designs for Calico Printing to Designs for printing other woven Fabrics.	The whole act.

==== Schedule B ====
Schedule B
Citation	Short title	Description	Extent of repeal
2 & 3 Vict. c. 17	Copyright of Designs Act 1839	An Act to secure to Proprietors of Designs for Articles of Manufacture the Copyright of such Designs for a limited Time.	The whole act.

== Subsequent developments ==
The scheme established by the act was further amended by the Copyright of Designs Act 1843 (6 & 7 Vict. c. 65), the Copyright of Designs Act 1850 (13 & 14 Vict. c. 104), the Copyright of Designs Act 1858 (21 & 22 Vict. c. 70), the Copyright of Designs Act 1861 (24 & 25 Vict. c. 73) and the Copyright of Designs Act 1875 (38 & 39 Vict. c. 93), before the whole subject of design protection was consolidated, together with the law of patents and trade marks, by the Patents, Designs, and Trade Marks Act 1883 (46 & 47 Vict. c. 57).

The whole act was repealed by section 113 of, and the third schedule to, the Patents, Designs, and Trade Marks Act 1883 (46 & 47 Vict. c. 57), which came into force on 1 January 1884.
