= National Folklore Board (Ghana) =

Statutory body in Ghana

- Occupation: Ghana Folklore

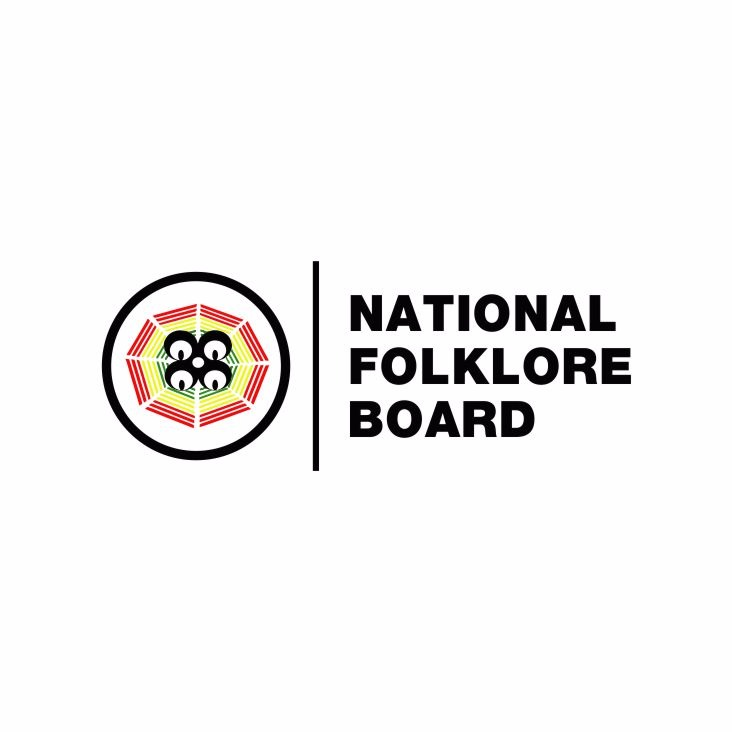
Logo of National Folklore Board

The National Folklore Board is a statutory body with the primary aim to protect and promote folklore of Ghana. Folklore in Ghana is defined as set of traditional beliefs and customs of a community that may be preserved by an ethnic group or unidentified Ghanaian author.

== History ==
National Folklore Board is under the Ministry of Tourism, Arts and Culture as a state agency. The National Folklore Board, is the statutory body established and mandated under the Copyright Act, 2005 (Act 690) (the “Act”), to administer, register, promote and protect Ghanaian expressions of folklore on behalf of the President and for the people of Ghana. The Board which consists of National Folklore Board, Chairperson, Copyright administrator, nominated individual by national commission on culture and six other persons. Folklore is based on oral tradition, passed on from generation to generation which encompasses intellectual and spiritual tradition. It is composed of customs, arts (dramatic), festivals, musical stories, proverbs celebrated over the years.

The National Folklore Board has partnered with multinational telecommunications company MTN to digitize Ghanaian folklore.

== Functions ==
National Folklore Board functions as a state agency, to perform the role of intellectual property and folklore branding in Ghana.

- To educate Ghanaians on folklore
- To preserve Ghana's rich heritage to influence nation building
- To boost domestic and international tourism to generate revenue and create jobs

== Activities ==
- Folklore Clubs
- Cultural Tourism
- National Traditional Games Competition
- Know your folklore campaign
- Monthly outdoor activities
- "Did you know" throughout the year
