= Trademarks Act, 2004 =

Ghanaian trademark legislation

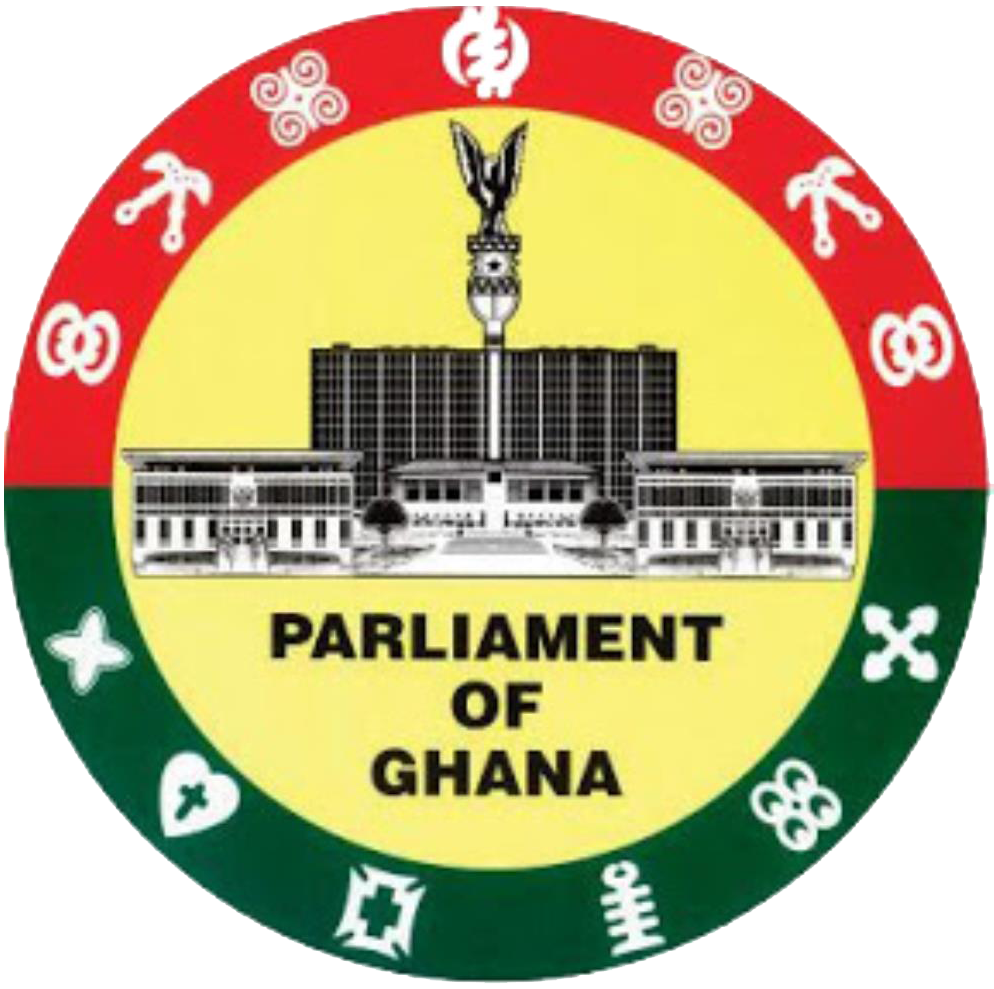

Parliament of Ghana
- Long title: AN ACT to provide for the protection of trademarks and for related matters
- Citation: Act 664
- Territorial extent: The Republic of Ghana
- Enacted by: Parliament of Ghana
- Assented to: 29 January 2004
- Signed by: President of the Republic of Ghana

Repeals
- Trademarks Act, 1965 (Act 270); Merchandise Marks Act, 1964 (Act 253)

Amended by
- Trademarks (Amendment) Act, 2014 (Act 876)

Summary
- Certifies the validity of a legally established company or a product whose origin is based in Ghana

Keywords
- Ghana Trademark Nice Agreement Paris Convention Madrid Protocol
- Status: In force

The Trademarks Act, 2004 (Act 664) is legislation enacted by the Third Parliament of the Fourth Republic of Ghana and signed into law by President John Agyekum Kufuor. The act regulates the process through which trademarks and collective marks are registered, the issuance of registered trademarks and how trademarks and collective marks are protected through the enforcement of the act. The rationale for enacting the act is for the protection of the goodwill and reputation of the business of a proprietor. The act establishes the Trademark Registry (Registar) to which is mandated to register trademarks and issue registered trademarks. The act has been amended by the Trademarks (Amendment) Act, 2014 (Act 876) which came into force on 25 July 2014. The Amendment incorporated the Madrid Protocol into The Act.

== Structure ==
This Act is made up of fifty-four (54) sections and three (3) schedules that are arranged under various headings as follows;

Headings	Sections
Registration of Trademarks	s 1–17
Trademark Registry	s 18–22
Trade description and Fraudulent Marks	s 23–33
Functions of Registrar and Legal Proceedings	s 34–43
Miscellaneous Provisions	s 44–54

Schedule	Title
First schedule	Article 4 – Paris convention 1967
Second schedule	Form of Notice
Third Schedule	Special Provisions Relating to Protection of Trademarks Through International Registration Under the Madrid Protocol

== Registration of trademarks ==
=== Meaning of trademark ===
Per the amendment, a trademark means, sign or combination of signs including words such as personal names, letters, numerals, and figurative elements. A trademark may consist of words, personal names, designs, letters, colours, numerals, shapes, holograms, sounds or a combination of any of these elements; slogans, where they are not long enough to be protected by copyrights.

=== Application for Registration ===
The application for registration of a trademark must be filed with the Registrar and is contingent on the payment of a prescribed fee. The application must contain a reproduction of the trademark and a list of goods or services for which for which the registration of the trademark is made and the applicant must have a bona fide intention for which the trademark is to be used in relation to goods or services. The application may contain a declaration claiming the priority of an earlier national or regional application filed by the applicant or the predecessor in title of the applicant.

An application for registration can be refused on several grounds such as where the trademark is a trade name, it is incapable of distinguishing the goods or services of one enterprise from the goods or services of another enterprise or devoid of distinctive character, it is contrary to public order or morality or it is likely to mislead the public or trade circles with particular reference to the geographical origin of the goods or services, their nature or characteristics among others.

Once the Registrar has examined the application for registration of the trademark and is satisfied that it complies with all the Act, the Registrar shall then publish the application as to allow any interested person to file a notice of opposition claiming that one or more of the requirements have not been met. When the Registrar sends a copy of the notice of opposition to the applicant and the applicant does not respond to the claims of the notice, the applicant will be deemed to have abandoned the application.

Where the application has not been opposed within the prescribed time limit or any oppositions were granted in favour of the applicant and the Registrar is satisfied that the application has met all necessary requirement, the Registrar shall then register the trademark, publish a reference to the registration and issue the applicant with a certificate of registration. When the trademark has been published trademark enjoys the same rights and privileges as if the trademark has been registered so long as the application has been published.

=== Meaning of collective mark ===
The amendment defines a collective mark is a visual sign capable of distinguishing the origin or any other characteristic of different enterprises which use the sign under the control of a registered owner from any other enterprises or a collective mark can be a visual sign cable of distinguishing the origin of the quality of goods or services of different enterprises which use the sign under the control of a registered owner from goods and services of any other enterprises. The former meaning can be described as a collective membership mark as the mark only serves to show membership in a collective group of enterprises and the collective itself does not use the mark to identify its products or services. The latter meaning of collective mark can be described as a collective mark for commerce as the mark is intended to identify the goods or service as belonging to a certain membership of enterprises.

=== Registration of Collective Mark ===
The registration procedure for collective marks is the same as the registration procedure for trademarks, and thus the Registrar may grant an applicant a registration certificate for a collective mark once he is satisfied that all requirements have been met. The only difference between the registration of trademarks and collective marks is that an application for registration of a collective mark shall designate the trademark as a collective mark and shall be accompanied with a copy of the regulations governing the use of the collective mark.

=== Rights Conferred by the Registration of Trademarks and Collective Marks ===
A person other than a registered owner of a trademark shall not knowingly infringe the rights of the owner of a registered trademark by using a trademark in relation to goods or services for which the trademark was registered without the consent of the owner. A person may also not use signs that are similar and identical to the registered trademark as the registered owner's right extend to such identical signs. In the Ghanaian case of Menkish Impex Limited v Pam Ventures Limited, it was held that, in relation to the two marks ‘’Heaven’’ and ‘’Dhoom’’, they are not so similar as to qualify for an infringement of trademark. The defendant’s mark ‘’Dhoom’’ was held not to resemble the Plaintiff’s registered mark as to cause the likelihood of confusion and deception.

Although the registered owner of a trademark has exclusive rights, such rights are limited to an extent. The rights conferred by registration do not extend, thus in turn no infringement claim can arise, to acts in respect of articles which have been put on the market in any country by the registered owner or with the consent of the owner.

Once the registered owner establishes an infringement of trademark, either by the authorised use of the registered trademark or acts likely to infringe the trademark, the registered owner may institute court action against a person who infringes a registered trademark and such a person may be held to have committed an offence and is liable on summary conviction to a fine of two hundred and fifty (250) penalty units or term of imprisonment not exceeding one year or both.

=== Duration of Trademark and Collective Mark Protection ===
The duration of a registered trademark is for a period of ten(10) years from the filing date of the application for registration and may be renewed for a consecutive period of ten years subject to the payment of a prescribed fee for renewal. The registration of a collective mark enjoys the same duration and renewal rights as a trademark.

=== Invalidation of Trademark and Collective Mark ===
An already registered trademark may be invalidated on two grounds, namely;

- Where it is proved that the registered trademark did not comply with any of the requirements in the Act.
- Where the registered trademark has become a common name in the trade for goods or services for which it is registered.

An already registered collective mark may be invalidated on three grounds, namely;

- Where only the registered owner uses the trademark to the exclusion of any other enterprises
- Where the registered owner permits the use of the trademark in contravention of the regulations of the collective mark
- Where the registered owner uses or permits the use of the trademark such a way as will likely to cause confusion to trade circles or the public as to the origin of the goods or services concerned.

=== Removal of Trademark and Collective Mark from Registration for Non-use ===
An already registered trademark, although not invalid, may be removed from the register of trademarks where a person interested in a trademark requests the Registrar to remove a trademark from the register because the trademark had not been used for a continuous period of five years or more. A collective mark may also be removed from the register in accordance with the procedure applied to trademarks.

=== Change in Ownership of a Trademark and Collective Mark ===
An application for a change in the ownership of a trademark or collective mark shall be in writing and be filed with the Registrar. The owner of a trademark may transfer the trademark in whole or in part for the goods or services for which it has been registered. Also where a person transfers an enterprise's, it is impliedly deemed that such a person has also transferred the trademark rights of the enterprise.

=== Licence Contract ===
A licence contract concerning the registration of a trademark or an application for registration shall be filed with the Registrar for which the contents shall be kept confidential but a reference to it will be published and if the said licence contract is not properly filed with the Registrar it is ineffective against third parties. For a licence contract to be valid, the licensor must have effective control over the quality of the goods or services of the licensee in connection with which the mark is used.

=== Agency ===
An applicant who has a registered trademark in Ghana but is an ordinary resident outside of Ghana's jurisdiction must be represented by a legal practitioner resident in the country.

== The Trademark Registry ==
=== The Trademark Register ===
The registry is mandated to make a register of trademarks for keeping records of all registered trademarks. In cases of collective marks (trademarks of companies) the registry is required to provide a special section in the register to keep them. Application for a trademark is to be in writing and it would only be granted if it is applied directly for a trade description or applied to goods; or it is applied to a covering label, reel, or any other thing in which the goods are sold or manufactured. After the application has been granted, a person (whether natural or legal) could be represented by the said trademark, the person is entitled to use it in businesses or in any kind of advertisement.

An entry in the register would be rectified or erased upon request where there has been an omission, error or a defect in the registration by the affected person. This request may be made to the registrar who further forwards the application to the high court. The application for rectification does not in any way affect the validation of the trademark unless it found that the trademark was made fraudulently. The time for correction of the errors may be extended on notice to the parties concerned and on the terms directed by the Registrar. The register as provided by the act is opened to the public; it is to be published in the gazette.

== Trade Description and Fraudulent Marks ==
=== Offences under the Act ===
An offence under The Act is any offence that is in relation to the unauthorised use of a trademark in relation to goods or any offence involving dishonesty and deception with a trademark.

A person is liable on summary conviction to a fine not exceeding five hundred penalty units or to a term of imprisonment not exceeding two years or to both the fine and the imprisonment when he applies a false trade description to goods; or forges a trademark; or use or possesses an article or instrument to forge a trademark; or sells or exposes for sale or for any purpose of trade or manufacture goods or things to which a forged trademark or false trade description is applied. In cases where prosecution for an offence where goods are imported, evidence of the port of shipment is prima facie evidence of the place of origin of the goods.

Where a person is convicted of an offence the goods and things of any kind by means of or in relation to which the offence is committed are liable, at the discretion of the Court, to be surrendered to the State.

However, a person may not be prosecuted after three years from the commission of the offence, or one year after the first discovery of the commission, by the prosecutor, whichever occurs first.

Again a person for the purpose of gain or the intent to cause loss to an owner of a trademark applies that trademark or a trademark that is likely to be mistaken for a registered one to goods or labelling or advertising of goods or as a business paper in relation to goods or has possession of goods with that sign of trademark, or has an article in possession his or her control or in the course of business with the intent to sell, hire or distribute for any purpose of trade commits an offence and is liable on a summary conviction to a fine of not less than two thousand penalty units and not more than seven thousand penalty units or to a term of imprisonment not less than five years and not more than fifteen years or both. A person who is charged with these offences is not entitled to bail, food, drugs, medical services, household chemicals, cosmetics, vehicle machine parts or electrical appliances.

=== Defences ===
A person may claim the acts done were of pure intent thus not for defrauding purposes. Also, he could claim he in good faith believed the trademark was genuine. Again reasonable precautions were taken against committing the offence charged or the relevant information was given to the police officer with respect to the persons on whose behalf the trademark, mark, or description was applied.

=== Forfeiture of Goods ===
A person may apply to the court for an order for the forfeiture goods which bears an identical sign or likely to be mistaken to his and are in connection with the investigation or prosecution of an offence for the court to release the goods materials or articles on condition that the person causes the sign to be obliterated and complies with any order to pay costs which has been made against that person. A person aggrieved by the order of the decision of the court may appeal.

=== Implied Warranty on the Sale of Goods ===
A buyer is mandated to accept trademarked good or trade description from a seller if there are no issues of fraud or forgery to the trademarked good.

== Functions of registrar and legal proceedings ==
The Act deals with the power of the Registrar to award costs. The Registrar may award costs and direct how and by which parties they are to be paid in proceedings under the Act. By leave of the court, order for costs may be enforced in the same manner as a judgement or order of the court.

Per the Act in all legal proceedings relating to a registered trade mark, registration of the trademark by the owner shall be prima facie evidence of the validity of the original registration of the trade mark and all subsequent assignments and transmission of it.

The certificate of validity. In legal proceedings, where there is an issue about the validity of the registration of a registered trademark, the court may certify validity in favour of the owner. In subsequent legal proceedings concerning validity, the owner of the trade mark is entitled to costs and expenses between legal practitioner and client on obtaining a final judgement, unless the court certifies otherwise. The orders of the Registrar are subject to judicial appeal. The Act provides the procedure for where an applicant has an option to make an application to the court or to Registrar. The application shall be made to the court if an action concerning the trademark in question is before the Court; or where the application is to the Registrar, the Registrar may refer the application to the court at any stage of the proceedings or may determine the question.

A copy of any entry in the register, purporting to be certified and sealed with the official seal of the Registrar shall be admissible in a court without further proof of the original. Also, a person may obtain a certified copy of a register entry from the Registrar on payment of the prescribed fee.

== Miscellaneous provisions ==
=== Falsification of Entries in Register ===
Under the Act, it is provided that a person who knowingly makes or causes a false entry to be made in the register commits an offence and is fixed with the liability of summary conviction of a fine not exceeding five hundred penalty unit and a term of imprisonment not exceeding one year or both.

=== Offences of Falsely Representing a Trademark as Registered ===
Per the Act it is an offence to negligently make a fraudulent representation for the purpose of falsely representing a trademark as registered, or that a partly registered trademark is separately registered as a Trademark or that a registered trademark is registered in respect of specific goods or that a registered trademark gives an exclusive right to use taking into account the limitations entered on the register. The offender shall be liable to imprisonment, fine or both. However, the continuance of offence attract a further fine for each day during this continuation.

In the USA first successful fraud case of In Re Bose Cooperation. Hexwave Inc, filed a use-based application to register the mark Hexwave, for a variety of electronic goods it claimed to be using in commerce. Bose corporation (“Bose”) opposed Hexwave's application based on fraud and likelihood of confusion with Bose's registered WAVE Mark for a variety of electronic goods. Hexwave filed a counterclaim to cancel Bose's registration on grounds of fraud and furnished evidence in this regard. Bose insisted that its renewal application was based on its honest, good faith belief that its receipt, repair and return of its previously sold audio tape recorder and players bearing wave Mark was sufficient to support its renewal application. The court held that trademark was obtained, procured or maintained fraudulently when an applicant or registrant makes false, material representation of fact in connection with a trademark application or registration with the intent to deceive the patent and trademark office.

=== Penalty for Unlawful User of Official Badges ===
The Act also prevents the use of reserved items such as badges, seals, devices, emblems or a flag for the use of the State or an apparatus of the State in a manner that leads or is likely to lead to the belief that that person is authorised to use such reserved items without lawful authority.

=== Jointly Owned Trademark ===
Two or more persons may be registered as a joint proprietor of a trademark, and shall apply as if those rights were vested in a single person but the right of the person who registered as joint owner can be infringed by any of the other owners who uses the trademark in respect of which the trademark is registered under which both or all of the joint owner have not been connected in course of trade. And also do not authorise the registration of two or more persons who use a trademark independently or propose to use it independently to be registered as joint owner.

=== Trust and Equities ===
Under this provision, no notice shall be entered in the register of a trust express, implied or constructive and the registrar shall not receive notice of a trust. The enforcement of equity in respect of a trademark may be enforced in the same manner as any other movable property.

=== Offences Committed by Body of Persons ===
An offence committed by body of persons which may include a body corporate other than a partnership, every director, manager, secretary or other officer of similar status of that body corporate shall be deemed to have committed that offence; and in the case of a partnership, every partner or officer of similar status shall be deemed to have committed that offence.

== Schedules ==
=== First Schedule ===
==== Article 4 of the Paris Convention in the Trademark Act of Ghana ====
This Schedule incorporated Article 4 of the Paris Convention into the Act

=== Second Schedule ===
==== Form of Notice ====
This part of the Schedule provides the standard form for a notice of fraudulent mark.

=== Third Schedule ===
==== Special Provisions Relating to Protection of Trademarks Through International Registration Under the Madrid Protocol ====
The Madrid System is a convenient and cost-effective solution for registering and managing trademarks worldwide. Ghana has made a declaration by incorporating some articles of the Madrid Protocol into the Amendment.
