= Patent Act, 2003 =

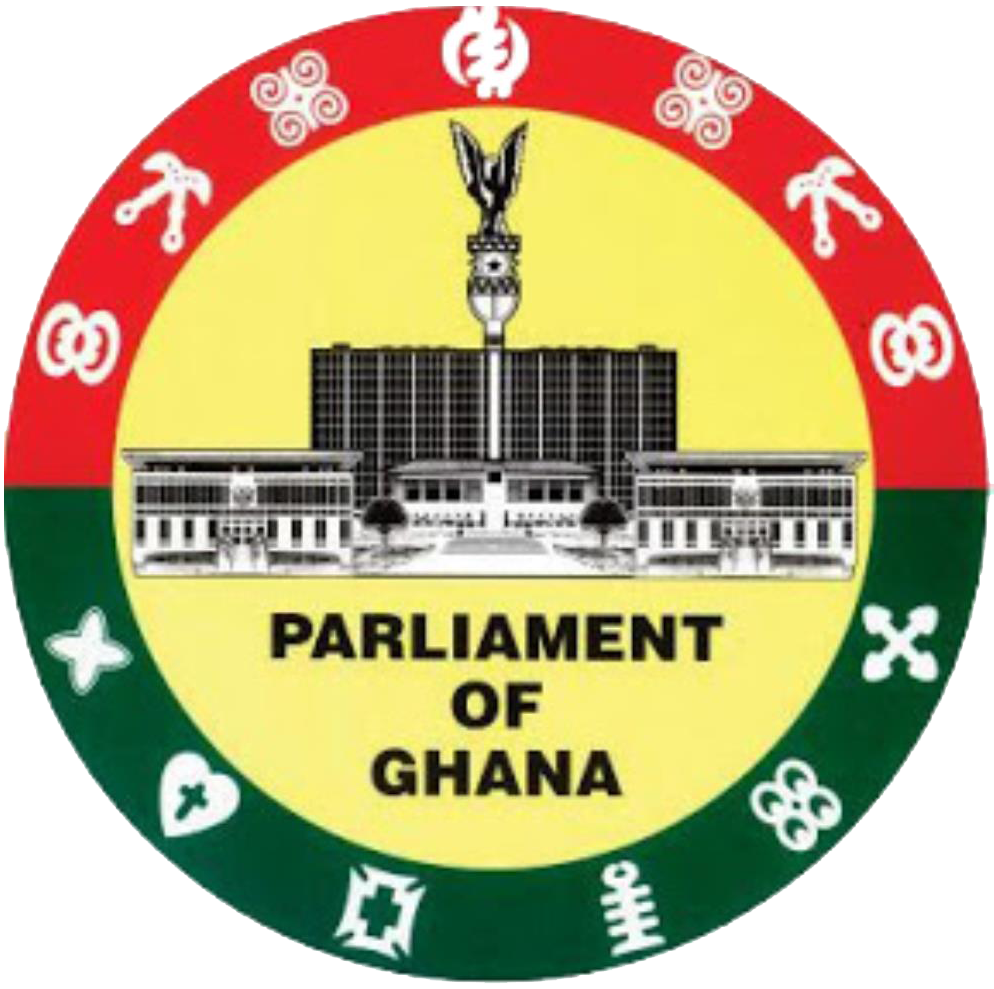

Parliament of Ghana
- Long title: AN ACT to provide for the protection of inventions and other related matters.
- Citation: Act 657
- Territorial extent: The Republic of Ghana
- Enacted by: Parliament of Ghana
- Assented to: 31 December 2003
- Signed by: President of the Republic of Ghana

Keywords
- Ghana Patent
- Status: In force

The Patent Act, 2003 (Act 657) is a law governing the granting and protections of patents in Ghana. It replaced the Patent Law, 1992 (PNDCL 305A).
