= Copyright Act, 2005 =

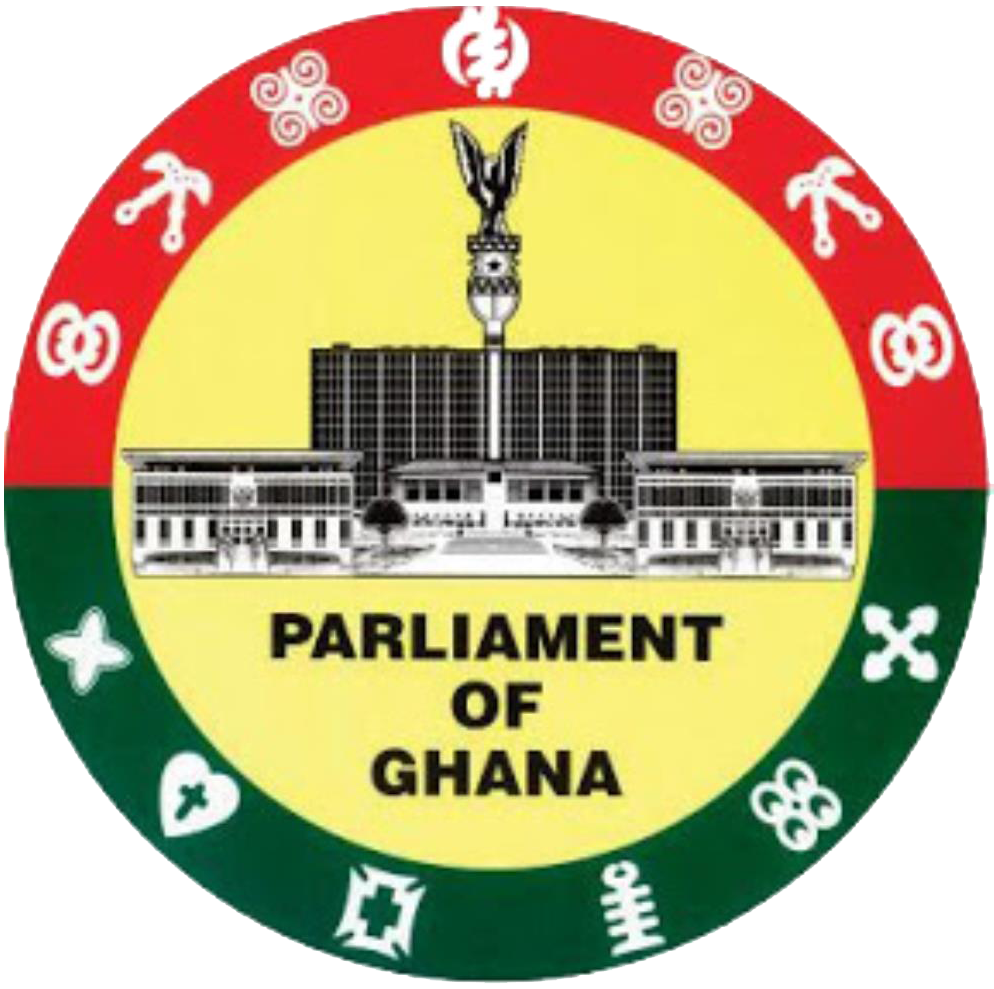

Ghana Parliament
- Long title: AN ACT to replace the Copyright Law, 1985 (P.N.D.C.L. 110); and bring the provisions on copyright and the Copyright Office in conformity with the Constitution and to provide for related purposes.
- Citation: Act 690
- Territorial extent: The Republic of Ghana
- Enacted by: Ghana Parliament
- Assented to: 17 May 2005.
- Signed by: The President Of The Republic Of Ghana
- Status: Current legislation

The Copyright Act, 2005 (Act 690) is the legal framework in Ghana that protects the use of an individual's work once the idea has been physically expressed. It is a form of intellectual property that protects original works of authorship of literary, dramatic, musical and artistic works such as poetry, novels, movies, songs, computer software and architecture. Copyright does not protect facts, ideas, systems or methods of operation, although it may protect the way these things are expressed. Ghana's current copyright law is the Copyright Act, 2005 (Act 690) issued by the Parliament of the Republic of Ghana. It was enacted on 17 May 2005 and replaced the Copyright Law, 1985 (PNDCL 110), the country's previous copyright law. The Copyright Act, 2005 affords protection to a variety of works, grants copyright holders rights to their work and defines the duration of that copyright protection.

== History ==
The history of copyright protection started in 1911 with the UK Copyright Act 1911 which was one of the statutes that was of general application to the British Colonies. Issues of copyright had been the responsibility of the ministry responsible for information. Ministerial responsibility for copyright matters changed to the National Commission on Culture when the National Commission on Culture Law, 1990 placed the Copyright Office under the National Commission on Culture. In 2005, the ministerial responsibility for copyright and related matters shifted to the Ministry of Justice.

== Structure ==
The Copyright Act is divided into 8 parts with 78 provisions:

Heading	Sections
Copyright	1–11
Duration	12–18
Permitted uses of Copyright	19–23
Copies of Sound Recordings, Mechanical Reproduction Rights of Composers	24
Enforcement Provisions	25–27
Protection of Performers and Broadcasting Organisations	28–37
General Provisions	38–64
Administration, the Copyright Office and Miscellaneous Matters	65–78

=== Copyright ===
The first division of the Copyright Act deals with the works of authors that are eligible for the grant of copyright protection such as literary work, artistic work, among others as stated in Section 1 of the Act and Folklore as provided for in Section 4 and those works that would not be granted copyright protection namely ideas, concepts, procedures, methods or other things of a similar nature as in Section 2 of the Act, the rights that accompany authorship and the rights and obligations of producers. According to Section 3 of the Act the copyright in a work shall be vested in the President for and on behalf of and in trust for the people of Ghana or an international body so long as the work in question is made under the control of the President on behalf and in trust for the people of the Republic or a specified international body.

The Act recognizes two main types of rights of authors in Sections 5 and 6 as Economic rights and the Moral rights of the authors respectively. The Economic rights can be broken down into reproduction rights, transformation rights., public performance, broadcasting and communication of the work to the public rights, distribution rights, and commercial rental rights while the moral rights of the author are basically the right to be named as the author of the work and the right to seek relief where the author's work has been used without his permission. In some instances the economic rights may be vested in an employer or a person who commissions the work done in the course of the author's employment or commission per Section 7 of the Act. Section 8 of the Act recognizes certain works that moral rights and economics rights would not vest in any person and that those works are held in trust for the public except those authored by private media. Copyright can also be transferred either in whole or part by assignment, testamentary disposition or operation of law as identified in Section 9 of the Act. The moral rights of the author cannot be transferred. Section 10 and 11 of the Act also provides for the obligations that producers of sound recordings or audio visuals have which copyright protection do not depend on and notice of the protection of the rights of producers respectively.

=== Duration of Copyright ===
The right to copyright does not subsist forever. There is a duration of copyright to every work that is copyright-able, after which the public is free to use it in any way it pleases. The Act gives the durations for works protected under copyright. This part of the Copyright Act covers, individuals, bodies corporate, anonymous works audio visual work, sound recordings expressions of folklore and moral rights. The moral rights of authors under Section 6 of the Act exist in perpetuity while the others mentioned above are limited to a certain time frame.

=== Permitted uses ===
The Copyright Act despite offering exclusive protection to a copyright holder, allows for some permitted use of such works which will not amount to infringement upon the author's Copyright. Copyrighted works can be used for personal purposes, research for which there should be citation of source, review purposes, reporting of current and fresh events and then for educational purposes. These are however subject to fair practice. The Act in dealing with computer programs allows for a copy of the program to be made by the lawful owner for the purposes of using it for the reason for which it was purchased or for archival purposes, this will not amount to infringement An infringement will not arise on the copying of a work if it is a single copy and it is to be used in a library or archive purposes.

=== Copies of Sound Recordings, Mechanical Reproduction Rights of Composers ===
Section 24 deals with copying and the reproduction of copyright works, the Act allows for a manufacturer or a producer to make copies of any musical work on condition that there already exist copies of that musical work made by the owner or licensed for the purposes of retail sale. However, the Act requires that producer or manufacturer provide the owner or authorized personnel with notice, the notice must include the name and address of the producer, the title of the work to which the notice relates, the type of sound recording and the number of copies he intends to make, the selling price of each and the date of possible availability for sale. This is however subject to a mechanical royalty fee of not less than seven per centum which is to be charged on each copy and paid to the copyright holder. A failure to comply with these provisions amounts to an infringement.

=== Enforcement Provisions ===
The enforcement mechanisms under the Act are in three legs: the security device for sound and audio visual recordings, importation of copyright works and the imposition of a levy on devices capable of reproducing copyright works. The first limb of enforcement provides that a manufacturer on the approval of the minister must purchase a security device for which he is to attach to each copy of a sound or audio visual recording, without which he cannot sell any copy or will be liable to a penalty. The second aspect of enforcement, seeks to restrict the importation of copyright works without the owner's consent into the jurisdiction. The section states that a Customs, Excise and Preventive Service office who is unsatisfied that a work is not pirated shall not permit the importation of such works unless it has with it a written declaration by the owner

The final leg of enforcement is provided for in Section 27 this involves the importation of a levy on devices capable of reproducing copyrighted works. This levy is to be collected by the Customs, Excise and Preventive Service and paid into a fund established by the Minister for the benefit of copyright holders. The invasion of which by any person who imports such devices, shall amount to an offense is liable on summary conviction to a fine of not less than two hundred and fifty penalty units or imprisonment for a term not exceeding twelve months.

=== Protection of Performers and Broadcasting Organisations ===
The rights of a performer bars any unauthorized person from; broadcasting or communicating a performance of the performer directly or indirectly to the public, with some exceptions; fixation of a performance not previously fixed on a physical medium, exercising the right of reproduction of the fixation in any manner or form, providing the first public distribution of the original or a copy of a fixation of a performance, providing or obtaining a rental of the original or a copy of the performance for the purpose of direct or indirect commercial advantage irrespective of the ownership of the original or copy rented, or making available to the public a fixed performance by wire or wireless means, in a way that members of the public may access it from a place and at a time individually chosen by them. The duration of a performer's right is seventy years starting from the end of the calendar year in which the performance was fixed on a physical medium or in the absence of such a fixation, from the end of the calendar year in which the performance took place. Also a performer is not precluded from entering into a contract as stated in Section 30. The moral rights of the performer are outlined under Section 31.

Section 32 provides for the requirement of authorization relating to broadcasting. It states that, In the absence of a law or contract to the contrary, the provisions of section 28 shall not imply a consent to; (a) license other broadcasters to transmit the performance, (b) make a fixation of the performance, (c) reproduce the fixation if the authorization granted is to broadcast and make a fixation of the performance, or (d) broadcast the performance from a previous fixation or from the reproduction of the fixation where initial permission was given solely to enable the broadcasting of the performance. Under Section 33, the right of broadcasters includes the right to, re-broadcast its broadcast, the fixation of its broadcast, or reproduce a fixation of its broadcast, or communicate to the public of its broadcast.

Section 35 expressly provides for the limitation on economic rights of performers and broadcasting organizations. According to Section 36, broadcasting rights are protected until the expiration of forty years from the date of making the broadcast of the signal. Section 37 entitles the authorized performer and producer in the case of a public performance and use of copyright work to royalties.

=== General Provisions ===
The copyright law affords protection to a variety of work and grants protection to holders to their works and defines the duration of that copyright protection. In Sections 38 to 58 we can find the general provisions of copyright law in Ghana. These provisions basically deal with things such as works that belong to the public domain, how copyright owners can register their works if they choose to and the effects of the infringement of copyright rights. For example, if an individual infringes another's copyright right that individual commits an offence and is liable to conviction to a fine of not more than one thousand penalty units and not less than five hundred penalty units or to a term of imprisonment of not more than three years or to both; and in the case of a continuing offence to a further fine of not less than twenty-five penalty units and not more than one hundred penalty units for each day during which the offence continues.

The above provision has been established in Section 43 whiles Section 46 has made provision to the victims of the office or forfeiture. In situations where there is a dispute pertaining to copyright the Copyright Act has provided the methods in which the dispute may be settled which negotiation, mediation by the copyright administrator and the last resort being the court[. Authors, producers, performers and publishers are even allowed to form collective administration societies for the promotion and protection of their interest. Per the Act, a copyright monitoring team as well as a copyright tribunal with a specific tenure of an officer and laid out functions as well as the rules of procedure.

=== National Folklore Board ===
Works of folklore are literary, artistic and scientific works forming part of the cultural heritage of Ghana such as Kente, Adinkra designs, folksongs and folktales. Act 690 establishes a National Folklore Board. This board is made up of a chairperson, the copyright administrator, a person nominated by the National Commission on culture and six other persons and all these people would be appointed by the President and with the aid of the Council of State. The members of the board are to hold office for 4 years however they can be reappointed on expiry of their term of office. A member may resign from his or her office and this should be done in writing and addressed to the President through the chairperson. When a position of a member becomes vacant, making that member unable to perform his or her duties under the office, the President will be notified by the chairperson and the President with the aid of the Council of state appoint another person to serve the unexpired term. After a person appointed has served his or her unexpired term, that person can be appointed as a member of the Board. Allowances allocated to the members of the Board shall be determined by the Minister with the aid of the Minister of Finance. Meetings of the board shall be held at specific places and ties determined by the chairperson, apart from that, the Board meets at least once every three months. Procedure of its meetings shall be regulated by the Board.

The national folklore board performs the following functions: Document and reserve works of folklore, Promote works of folklore in Ghana and abroad, Promote the protection of works of folklore, License the use of folklore works for purposes other than "private" and Organize seminars, fora etc. to inform and educate the public on the use and preservation of works of folklore. Persons intending to commercially exploit such works of folklore are required under Act 690 to first obtain authorization from the National Folklore Board of Trustees, and pay the required fees. There shall be a creation of a fund by the Minister with the approval of the Accountant General and this fund will be used for the deposit of any fee that is charged in the name of folklore. The fund that is created will be managed by the board will be used for the promotion and preservation of folklore and other local arts.

=== Administration. The Copyright Office And Miscellaneous Matters ===
The threshold in the administration of copyright in Ghana started with the passage of the Copyright Law, 1985. Section 65 of the Act established the Copyright Office which shall consist of the Copyright Administrator who shall be appointed under Section 68 of the Act and other offices. The Copyright Administrator shall be appointed by the president in accordance with the advice of the Legal Service Board, which is regarded as the governing body of the copyright office, given in consultation with the Public services commission. The administrator is said to be responsible for the day-to-day administration of the office subject to the directives that the Legal Service board may give. The Act also establishes other offices and employees that shall be appointed by the President in accordance with Article 195 of the Constitution on the terms and conditions that the President may determine. The Copyright Office performs the following statutory functions in line with Section 66 of the Copyright Act.1. It is responsible for the administration of the copyright. 2. In pursuance of its objectives the Copyright Office performs the following functions;

- Implements Copyright and Copyright related laws and regulations and provide for Copyright administration.
- Investigates and redresses cases of infringement of Copyright and settle disputes where these disputes have not been reserved for settlement by the Copyright tribunal.
- Responsible for the administration of external copyright relations.
- Administers Copyright of which the state is owner.
- Carries out other duties in relation to Copyright administration.
- Registers Copyright works, productions, publications and associations.
- Organizes seminars, conferences and workshops to educate the general populace and Copyright owners in particular on their rights and obligations under the Law.

The governing body of the Copyright Office shall be the Legal Service Board. The funds for the operation of the Copyright Office are provided for in Section 70 of the Act ad they include money approved by the Parliament for the office, donations, gifts and money received from any other source approved by the Minister for Finance. The Office is to submit estimates of the budget for the Copyright Office for the ensuing year to the Minister for Finance at the end of each financial year. The Office shall keep accounts and records which shall be audited by the Auditor-General within three months after the financial year and also submit annual reports to the minister through the Legal Service Board covering the activities of the Office for that year after the expiration of the financial year but within six months after the end of the year. The interpretation of certain words or phrases can be found in Section 76 of the Act.
