= Metropolitan Police Act =

Stock short title used for UK legislation

Metropolitan Police Act (with its variations) is a stock short title used for legislation relating to the Metropolitan Police.

== List ==
- The Metropolitan Police Act 1829 (10 Geo. 4. c. 44)
- The Metropolitan Police Act 1833 (3 & 4 Will. 4. c. 89)
- The Metropolitan Police Act 1839 (2 & 3 Vict. c. 47)
- The Metropolitan Police Act 1856 (19 & 20 Vict. c. 2)
- The Metropolitan Police Act 1857 (20 & 21 Vict. c. 64)
- The Metropolitan Police Act 1860 (repealed by Part I of Schedule 10 to the Police Act 1964, except as applied by the Special Constables Act 1923)
- The Metropolitan Police Act 1861 (24 & 25 Vict. c. 51) (repealed by Part I of Schedule 10 to the Police Act 1964)
- The Metropolitan Police Act 1864 (27 & 28 Vict. c. 55)
- The Metropolitan Police Act 1884 (47 & 48 Vict. c. 17)
- The Metropolitan Police Act 1886 (49 & 50 Vict. c. 22)
- The Metropolitan Police Act 1887 (50 & 51 Vict. c. 45)
- The Metropolitan Police Act 1899 (62 & 63 Vict. c. 26)
- The Metropolitan Police Act 1912 (2 & 3 Geo. 5. c. 4)
- The Metropolitan Police Act 1918 (7 & 8 Geo. 5. c. 61)
- The Metropolitan Police Act 1933 (23 & 24 Geo. 5. c. 33)

=== Metropolitan Police (Receiver) Act ===
- The Metropolitan Police (Receiver) Act 1861 (24 & 25 Vict. c. 124)
- The Metropolitan Police (Receiver) Act 1867 (30 & 31 Vict. c. 39)
- The Metropolitan Police (Receiver) Act 1895 (58 & 59 Vict. c. 12)

=== Metropolitan Police (Borrowing Powers) Act ===
- The Metropolitan Police (Borrowing Powers) Act 1897 (60 & 61 Vict. c. 42)
- The Metropolitan Police (Borrowing Powers) Act 1935 (25 & 26 Geo. 5. c. 16)
- The Metropolitan Police (Borrowing Powers) Act 1952 (15 & 16 Geo. 6 & 1 Eliz. 2. c. 19)

=== Metropolitan Police Staff Superannuation Act ===
- The Metropolitan Police Staff (Superannuation) Act 1875 (38 & 39 Vict. c. 28)
- The Metropolitan Police Staff Superannuation Act 1885 (48 & 49 Vict. c. 68)
- The Metropolitan Police (Staff Superannuation and Police Fund) Act 1931 (21 & 22 Geo. 5. c. 12)

=== Metropolitan Police Courts Act ===
- The Metropolitan Police Courts Act 1839 (2 & 3 Vict. c. 71)
- The Metropolitan Police Courts Act 1840 (3 & 4 Vict. c. 84)
- The Metropolitan Police Court (Buildings) Act 1871 (34 & 35 Vict. c. 35)
- The Metropolitan Police Magistrates Act 1875 (38 & 39 Vict. c. 3)
- The Metropolitan Police Courts Act 1897 (60 & 61 Vict. c. 26)
- The Metropolitan Police Courts (Holidays) Act 1897 (60 & 61 Vict. c. 14)
- The Metropolitan Police Courts Act 1898 (61 & 62 Vict. c. 31)

=== Other ===
- The Metropolitan Police Act 1839 (Amendment) Act 1958 (6 & 7 Eliz. 2. c. 48) (repealed by the Criminal Justice Act 1967).
- The Police Rate Act 1868 (31 & 32 Vict. c. 67)
- The Metropolitan Police (Compensation) Act 1886 (49 & 50 Vict. c. 11)
- The Metropolitan Police (Commission) Act 1906 (6 Edw. 7. c. 6)
- The Police Act 1909 (9 Edw. 7. c. 40)
- The Metropolitan Police (Employment in Scotland) Act 1914 (4 & 5 Geo. 5. c. 44)

=== Metropolitan Police Acts ===
The Metropolitan Police Acts 1829 to 1884 was the collective title of the Metropolitan Police Act 1884 (47 & 48 Vict. c. 17), and the acts listed in the schedule to that act.

The Metropolitan Police Acts 1829 to 1895 is the collective title of the following acts:

- The Metropolitan Police Act 1829 (10 Geo. 4. c. 44)
- The Metropolitan Police Act 1839 (2 & 3 Vict. c. 47)
- The Metropolitan Police Act 1856 (19 & 20 Vict. c. 2)
- The Metropolitan Police Act 1857 (20 & 21 Vict. c. 64)
- The Metropolitan Police Act 1860 (23 & 24 Vict. c. 135)
- The Metropolitan Police Act 1861 (24 & 25 Vict. c. 51)
- The Metropolitan Police (Receiver) Act 1861 (24 & 25 Vict. c. 124)
- The Metropolitan Police Act 1864 (27 & 28 Vict. c. 55)
- The Metropolitan Police (Receiver) Act 1867 (30 & 31 Vict. c. 39)
- The Police Rate Act 1868 (31 & 32 Vict. c. 67)
- The Metropolitan Police Staff (Superannuation) Act 1875 (38 & 39 Vict. c. 28)
- The Metropolitan Police Act 1884 (47 & 48 Vict. c. 17)
- The Metropolitan Police Staff Superannuation Act 1885 (48 & 49 Vict. c. 68)
- The Metropolitan Police Act 1886 (49 & 50 Vict. c. 22)
- The Metropolitan Police Act 1887 (50 & 51 Vict. c. 45)
- The Police Act 1890 (53 & 54 Vict. c. 45)
- The Metropolitan Police (Receiver) Act 1895 (58 & 59 Vict. c. 12)

The Metropolitan Police Acts 1829 to 1909 was the collective title of the Metropolitan Police Acts 1829 to 1899 and, so far as it amended those acts, the Police Act 1909.

The Metropolitan Police Acts 1829 to 1912 was the collective title of the Metropolitan Police Acts 1829 to 1909, and the Metropolitan Police Act 1912 (2 & 3 Geo. 5. c. 4).

The Metropolitan Police Acts 1829 to 1918 was the collective title of the Metropolitan Police Acts 1829 to 1912, and the Metropolitan Police Act 1918 (7 & 8 Geo. 5. c. 61).

The Metropolitan Police Acts 1829 to 1931 was the collective title of the Metropolitan Police Acts 1829 to 1912, and the Metropolitan Police (Staff Superannuation and Police Fund) Act 1931 (21 & 22 Geo. 5. c. 12).

The Metropolitan Police Acts 1829 to 1935 was the collective title of the Metropolitan Police Acts 1829 to 1931, and the Metropolitan Police (Borrowing Powers) Act 1935 (25 & 26 Geo. 5. c. 16).

The Metropolitan Police Acts 1829 to 1946 was the collective title of the Metropolitan Police Acts 1829 to 1935, and section 16 of the Police Act 1946 (9 & 10 Geo. 6. c. 46).

The Metropolitan Police Acts 1829 to 1952 was the collective title of the Metropolitan Police Acts 1829 to 1946, the Metropolitan Police Act 1933 (23 & 24 Geo. 5. c. 33), and the Metropolitan Police (Borrowing Powers) Act 1952 (15 & 16 Geo. 6 & 1 Eliz. 2. c. 19).

The Metropolitan Police Acts 1829 to 1958 was the collective title of the Metropolitan Police Acts 1829 to 1952, and the Metropolitan Police Act 1839 (Amendment) Act 1958 (6 & 7 Eliz. 2. c. 48).

The Metropolitan Police Acts 1829 to 1959 was the collective title of the Metropolitan Police Acts 1829 to 1946, the Metropolitan Police Act 1933 (23 & 24 Geo. 5. c. 33), and the Metropolitan Magistrates' Courts Act 1959 (7 & 8 Eliz. 2. c. 45).

The Metropolitan Police Acts 1829 to 1963 was the collective title of the Metropolitan Police Acts 1829 to 1959, and section 76 of the Local Government Act 1963 (c. 33).

== See also ==
- List of short titles
