= Metropolitan Police Act 1856 =

Act of the Parliament of the United Kingdom

Metropolitan Police Act 1856 (Note: The citation of this act by this short title was authorised by section 1 of, and the first schedule to, the Short Titles Act 1896. Due to the repeal of those provisions it is now authorised by section 19(2) of the Interpretation Act 1978.)
- Act of Parliament
- Parliament of the United Kingdom
- Long title: An Act to amend the acts relating to the Metropolitan Police.
- Citation: 19 & 20 Vict. c. 2
- Territorial extent: United Kingdom

Dates
- Royal assent: 28 February 1856
- Commencement: 28 February 1856 (Note: Section 1.)
- Repealed: 3 July 2000 (Note: The Greater London Authority Act 1999 (Commencement No. 7, Transitional Provisions and Amendment) Order 2000 (SI 2000/1648).)
Other legislation
Amends	Metropolitan Police Act 1829; Metropolitan Police Act 1839
Amended by	Statute Law Revision Act 1875; Metropolitan Police Act 1884; Metropolitan Police Act 1933; Representation of the People Act 1948
Repealed by	Statute Law Revision Act 1875; Statute Law Revision Act 1982; Metropolitan Police Act 1899; House of Commons Disqualification Act 1957; Justices of the Peace Act 1968; Administration of Justice Act 1973; Greater London Authority Act 1999

Status: Repealed

Text of statute as originally enacted

Revised text of statute as amended

Metropolitan Police Act 1884
- Act of Parliament
- Parliament of the United Kingdom
- Long title: An Act to provide for the appointment of an additional Assistant Commissioner of Police of the Metropolis and for other purposes relating to the Commissioner and Assistant Commissioners of such Police.
- Citation: 47 & 48 Vict. c. 17
- Territorial extent: United Kingdom

Dates
- Royal assent: 23 June 1884
- Commencement: 23 June 1884 (Note: The Acts of Parliament (Commencement) Act 1793.)
- Repealed: 18 July 1973
Other legislation
Amends	Metropolitan Police Act 1856; Police Rate Act 1868; Metropolitan Police Staff (Superannuation) Act 1875
Amended by	Metropolitan Police Act 1884; Statute Law Revision Act 1950
Repealed by	Statute Law (Repeals) Act 1973

Status: Repealed

Text of statute as originally enacted

The Metropolitan Police Act 1856 (19 & 20 Vict. c. 2) was an act of the Parliament of the United Kingdom, passed on 28 February 1856. The act modified the previous Metropolitan Police Act 1829 (10 Geo. 4. c. 44) and Metropolitan Police Act 1839 (2 & 3 Vict. c. 47), merging the two roles of First Commissioner and Second Commissioner into the single role of Commissioner of Police of the Metropolis and setting up a system of two assistant commissioners under him. The roles of First and Second Joint Commissioner had been filled by Richard Mayne and William Hay until the latter's death in 1855. The act provided for one of the First and Second Commissioners to become the sole Commissioner as soon as the other one died – effectively it meant that no new Second Joint Commissioner was appointed and Mayne became sole Commissioner. The act also set the maximum for the Commissioner's annual salary at £1500 and that for each Assistant Commissioner at £800.

The act also established the Assistant Commissioners as ex officio justices of the peace for all counties then partly or wholly covered by the Metropolitan Police District (i.e. Middlesex, Surrey, Hertfordshire, Essex, Kent, Berkshire and Buckinghamshire). He was not to act as a JP, however, "at any Court of General or Quarter Sessions, or in any Matter out of Sessions, except for the Preservation of the Peace, the Prevention of Crimes, the Detention and Committal of Offenders, and in carrying into execution the Purposes of this Act and the said recited Acts" and like usual JPs could not be elected as a Member of Parliament or vote in some general elections.

In the case of the Commissioner of Police of the Metropolis being ill or the post being left vacant, either assistant commissioner could be authorised by one of the Principal Secretaries of State to act as acting commissioner. The assistant commissioners were also to be "within the Provisions of the act of the Session holden in the Fourth and Fifth Years of King William the Fourth, Chapter Twenty-four, in like Manner as if their Offices were enumerated in the Schedule to that Act". It and the Police Rate Act 1868 (31 & 32 Vict. c. 67) were modified by the Metropolitan Police Act 1884, adding a third Assistant Commissioner to the existing two and establishing the short titles for 1829, 1839, 1856, 1857 and 1861 Metropolitan Police Acts, the Police Rate Act 1868 and the Metropolitan Police Staff (Superannuation) Act 1875 (38 & 39 Vict. c. 28).

== Subsequent developments ==
In section 2 of the act, the words "and of all liberties therein", and the words from "and for all liberties" to "for counties" were repealed by section 8(2) of, and part I of schedule 5 to, the Justices of the Peace Act 1968, which came into force on 25 October 1968.

The whole act was repealed by section 1(1) of, and part XIII of schedule 1 to, the Statute Law (Repeals) Act 1973, which came into force on 18 July 1973.
