= Metropolitan Police Act 1887 =

Act of the Parliament of the United Kingdom

Metropolitan Police Act 1887 (Note: Section 1.)
- Act of Parliament
- Parliament of the United Kingdom
- Long title: An Act for further amending the Enactments relating to Offices, Stations, and Buildings for the Metropolitan Police Force.
- Citation: 50 & 51 Vict. c. 45
- Territorial extent: United Kingdom

Dates
- Royal assent: 16 September 1887
- Commencement: 16 September 1887 (Note: The Acts of Parliament (Commencement) Act 1793.)
Other legislation
Amends	Metropolitan Police Act 1886
Amended by	Statute Law Revision Act 1908; Metropolitan Magistrates' Courts Act 1959; Statute Law (Repeals) Act 1986; Greater London Authority Act 1999; Greater London Authority Act 1999 (Commencement No. 7, Transitional Provisions and Amendment) Order 2000
Relates to	Greater London Authority Act 1999

Status: Partially repealed

Text of statute as originally enacted

Revised text of statute as amended

Text of the Metropolitan Police Act 1887 as in force today (including any amendments) within the United Kingdom, from legislation.gov.uk.

The Metropolitan Police Act 1887 (50 & 51 Vict. c. 45) is an act of the Parliament of the United Kingdom. The act was one of the last of the Metropolitan Police Acts.

The act modified Section 3 of the Metropolitan Police Act 1886 (49 & 50 Vict. c. 22), allowing the Receiver of the Metropolitan Police to take out loans up to a total of £500,000 (section 2.1) and banning the lender from inquiring as to the purpose of the loan (section 2.3). It also added buying fittings and furniture for a central police office to the possible reasons allowed for a loan, but added the proviso that all loans for such purchases had to be paid back within 15 years (section 2.2). It also granted the Receiver the power to grant leases on lands held by him but not immediately needed for police purposes (section 3).

The act's whole final section, section 4, also clarified a small piece of land extending Cannon Row. That piece of land contained about 63 yards and was believed to be public land vested in the Westminster district's Board of Works. The piece of land was surrounded by lands vested or about to be vested in the Receiver, but it was unclear if the Board of Works had the powers to transfer that piece of land to the Receiver - the act agreed to allow the Board to transfer the land to the Receiver.

== Subsequent developments ==
Section 4 of the act was repealed by section 1(1) of, and group 3 of part I of schedule 1 to, the Statute Law (Repeals) Act 1986, which came into force on 2 May 1986.
