= Greater London Authority Act 1999 =

Act of the Parliament of the United Kingdom

Greater London Authority Act 1999 (Note: Section 425(1).)
- Act of Parliament
- Parliament of the United Kingdom
- Long title: An Act to establish and make provision about the Greater London Authority, the Mayor of London and the London Assembly; to make provision in relation to London borough councils and the Common Council of the City of London with respect to matters consequential on the establishment of the Greater London Authority; to make provision with respect to the functions of other local authorities and statutory bodies exercising functions in Greater London; to make provision about transport and road traffic in and around Greater London; to make provision about policing in Greater London and to make an adjustment of the metropolitan police district; and for connected purposes.
- Citation: 1999 c. 29
- Introduced by: Jack Straw MP, Home Secretary (Commons); Lord Whitty Parliamentary Under-Secretary of State, Department of the Environment, Transport and the Regions (Lords)
- Territorial extent: England and Wales; Scotland; (Note: Section 425(7).)

Dates
- Royal assent: 11 November 1999
- Commencement: Various (Note: Section 425.)
Other legislation
Amends	Metropolitan Police Act 1829; London Hackney Carriages Act 1843; Town Police Clauses Act 1847; Metropolitan Police Act 1856; Metropolitan Police (Receiver) Act 1861; Metropolitan Police (Receiver) Act 1867; Metropolitan Police Act 1886; Riot (Damages) Act 1886; Metropolitan Police Act 1887; Metropolitan Police Act 1899; Local Government Act 1948; Transport Act 1962; London Government Act 1963; Administration of Justice Act 1964; Public Works Loans Act 1965; Local Government Act 1966; London Cab Act 1968; Pensions (Increase) Act 1971; Aviation Security Act 1982; Road Traffic Regulation Act 1984; Rates Act 1984; Housing Associations Act 1985; Statute Law (Repeals) Act 1989; Town and Country Planning Act 1990; Value Added Tax Act 1994; Police Act 1996; Private Hire (London) Act 1998
Amended by	Countryside and Rights of Way Act 2000; Political Parties, Elections and Referendums Act 2000; Capital Allowances Act 2001; Land Registration Act 2002; Statute Law (Repeals) Act 2004; Greater London Authority Act 2007; Criminal Justice and Immigration Act 2008; Parliamentary Voting System and Constituencies Act 2011; Postal Services Act 2011; Co-operative and Community Benefit Societies Act 2014; Infrastructure Act 2015; Riot Compensation Act 2016; Policing and Crime Act 2017; Elections Act 2022; Digital Markets, Competition and Consumers Act 2024; Planning and Infrastructure Act 2025; English Devolution and Community Empowerment Act 2026

Status: Amended

Text of statute as originally enacted

Revised text of statute as amended

The Greater London Authority Act 1999 (c. 29) is an act of the Parliament of the United Kingdom that established the Greater London Authority, the London Assembly and the Mayor of London.

== Background ==
Before the creation of the Greater London Authority, there was no single entity managing the entirety of London. Governance of the city was fragmented, and responsibilities for planning, transport, and other city-wide matters were divided between local boroughs and national authorities.

In 1965, the Greater London Council was established, covering a broader area. It managed transport, strategic planning, and services across Greater London. The Greater London Council, however, was dissolved in 1986 by the Local Government Act 1985 and its powers were devolved to the London boroughs and other entities.

The act was brought in after a referendum was held under the Greater London Authority (Referendum) Act 1998 (c. 3). The referendum question was: 'Are you in favour of the Government's proposals for a Greater London Authority, made up of an elected mayor and a separately elected assembly?' The yes vote was 72.01%, the no vote was 27.99%.

== Provisions ==
Apart from the main provisions creating the authority and transferring powers to it, the act also created a Metropolitan Police Authority for the Metropolitan Police Service, and consequently altered the borders of the Metropolitan Police District to be coterminous with Greater London (excluding the City, which has its own police force).

The act gave the mayor the power to direct the director of rail franchising. The act established Transport for London.

The act comprises 425 sections in 12 parts, including 22 named chapters and 34 schedules. It was the longest act to be passed by Parliament since the Government of India Act 1935. Its 12 parts were:

- Part I The Greater London Authority - Sections 1 to 29
- Part II General Functions and Procedure - Sections 30 to 80
- Part III Financial Provisions - Sections 81 to 140
- Part IV Transport - Sections 141 to 303
- Part V The London Development Agency - Sections 304 to 309
- Part VI Police and Probation Services - Sections 310 to 327
- Part VII The London Fire and Emergency Planning Authority - Sections 328 to 333
- Part VIII Planning - Sections 334 to 350
- Part IX Environmental Functions - Sections 351 to 374
- Part X Culture, Media and Sport - Sections 375 to 386
- Part XI Miscellaneous and General Provisions - Sections 387 to 404
- Part XII Supplementary Provisions - Sections 405 to 425

== Reception ==
The King's Fund criticised the lack of powers relating to health policy being included in the original version of the bill.

== Amendments ==
The act was amended by the Greater London Authority Act 2007 (c. 24) entitled 'An Act to make further provision with respect to the Greater London Authority; to amend the Greater London Authority Act 1999; to make further provision with respect to the functional bodies, within the meaning of that Act, and the Museum of London; and for connected purposes.'
