= Metropolitan Police Staff (Superannuation) Act 1875 =

Act of the Parliament of the United Kingdom

Metropolitan Police Staff (Superannuation) Act 1875 (Note: Section 5.)
- Act of Parliament
- Parliament of the United Kingdom
- Long title: An Act to amend the Law respecting the Superannuation Allowances of certain Officers of the Staff of the Metropolitan Police.
- Citation: 38 & 39 Vict. c. 28
- Territorial extent: United Kingdom

Dates
- Royal assent: 29 June 1875
- Commencement: 29 June 1875 (Note: The Acts of Parliament (Commencement) Act 1793.)
- Repealed: 1 November 1968 (Note: The Superannuation (Miscellaneous Provisions) Act 1967,s.15 (Appointed Day) Order 1968 (SI 1968/1373).)
Other legislation
Amends	Metropolitan Police Act 1839; Police Rate Act 1868
Amended by	Statute Law Revision Act 1883; Metropolitan Police Act 1884; Statute Law Revision Act 1950
Repealed by	Superannuation (Miscellaneous Provisions) Act 1967

Status: Repealed

Text of statute as originally enacted

The Metropolitan Police Staff (Superannuation) Act 1875 (38 & 39 Vict. c. 28) was an act of the Parliament of the United Kingdom, setting up for the first time an overall system of pensions for all non-constables of the Metropolitan Police, commonly known as civil staff. It also allowed for the renewal of any "superannuation allowance" awarded to civil staff under the Superannuation Act 1834.

== Subsequent developments ==
Section 3 of the act to " allowance and " was repealed by section 1(1) of, and the first schedule to, the Statute Law Revision Act 1950 (14 Geo. 6. c. 6), which came into force on 23 May 1950.

The whole act was repealed by section 15(8) of the Superannuation (Miscellaneous Provisions) Act 1967, which came into force on 1 November 1968.
