= Metropolitan Police Act 1886 =

Act of the Parliament of the United Kingdom

Metropolitan Police Act 1886 (Note: Section 1.)
- Act of Parliament
- Parliament of the United Kingdom
- Long title: An Act to amend the Enactments relating to Offices, Stations, and Buildings for the Metropolitan Police Force.
- Citation: 49 & 50 Vict. c. 22
- Territorial extent: United Kingdom

Dates
- Royal assent: 4 June 1886
- Commencement: 4 June 1886 (Note: The Acts of Parliament (Commencement) Act 1793.)

Other legislation
- Amends: Metropolitan Police Act 1857
- Amended by: Metropolitan Police Act 1887; Statute Law Revision Act 1898; Police Act 1946; Acquisition of Land (Authorisation Procedure) Act 1946; Metropolitan Magistrates' Courts Act 1959; Police Act 1964; Land Compensation Act 1973; Acquisition of Land Act 1981; Statute Law (Repeals) Act 1989; Greater London Authority Act 1999
- Relates to: Metropolitan Police Act 1861

Status: Partially repealed

Text of statute as originally enacted

Revised text of statute as amended

Text of the Metropolitan Police Act 1886 as in force today (including any amendments) within the United Kingdom, from legislation.gov.uk.

The Metropolitan Police Act 1886 (49 & 50 Vict. c. 22) is an act of the Parliament of the United Kingdom. The act one of the Metropolitan Police Acts. Sections 1, 2, 4, 6 and 7 are still in force.

Like the Metropolitan Police Act 1861 (24 & 25 Vict. c. 51), it mainly dealt with the role of the Receiver of the Metropolitan Police, granting him the power to buy or lease land, build new central offices, police stations and other buildings for the Metropolitan Police and to expand existing ones (Section 2). If the Receiver intended the buildings there to be permanent, he was also empowered to use the Metropolitan Police Fund as security up to a total of £200,000, to be paid into the Receiver's account in the Bank of England and repaid within 30 (or 60 for the purchase of freehold land) years of taking out the mortgage (Section 2.1-2).

Such loans were taken out as provided for in the Local Loans Act 1875 (38 & 39 Vict. c. 83) (section 2.3) and had to be authorised by a Secretary of State and the Treasury (section 6). They could be lent by the Metropolitan Board of Works (section 2.4). The Act also put measures in place for such land purchases, including advertising the purpose of planned land purchases in the local press (section 3.2.a.) and serve notice to the land's owners or lessees or his or her agent (Section 3.2.b). The owners or lessees were granted the right to appeal to the Secretary of State over the purchase (section 3.3) and the Secretary of State to hold a local inquiry to resolve issues (section 3.4). The act also required the Receiver and the relevant local government board to re-house working class tenants or lodgers made homeless by the purchase of land for the Metropolitan Police (section 5).
