= Magistrates' Courts Act 1952 =

Act of the Parliament of the United Kingdom

Magistrates' Courts Act 1952 (Note: Section 133(1).)
- Act of Parliament
- Parliament of the United Kingdom
- Long title: An Act to consolidate certain enactments relating to the jurisdiction of, and the practice and procedure before, magistrates' courts and the functions of justices' clerks, and to matter connected therewith, with corrections and improvements made under the Consolidation of Enactments (Procedure) Act 1949.
- Citation: 15 & 16 Geo. 6 & 1 Eliz. 2. c. 55
- Territorial extent: England and Wales (Note: Section 133(2). Did not extend to Scotland or Northern Ireland, except so far as provision to the contrary by sections 70(4) and 103.)

Dates
- Royal assent: 1 August 1952
- Commencement: 1 June 1953 (Note: Section 133(3).)
- Repealed: 6 July 1981 (Note: The Magistrates' Courts Act 1980 (Commencement) Order 1981 (SI 1981/457).)
Other legislation
Amends	See § Repealed enactments
Repeals/revokes	See § Repealed enactments
Amended by	Affiliation Proceedings Act 1957; Mental Health Act 1959; Legitimacy Act 1959; Distress for Rates Act 1960; Road Traffic Act 1960; Matrimonial Proceedings (Magistrates' Courts) Act 1960; Police Act 1964; Criminal Law Act 1967; Sexual Offences Act 1967; Firearms Act 1968; Theft Act 1968; Justices of the Peace Act 1968; Courts Act 1971; Criminal Justice Act 1972; Costs in Criminal Cases Act 1973; Powers of Criminal Courts Act 1973; Statute Law (Repeals) Act 1974; Bail Act 1976; Domestic Proceedings and Magistrates' Courts Act 1978; Interpretation Act 1978; Statute Law (Repeals) Act 1978; Justices of the Peace Act 1979; Child Care Act 1980
Repealed by	Magistrates' Courts Act 1980

Status: Repealed

Text of statute as originally enacted

The Magistrates' Courts Act 1952 (15 & 16 Geo. 6 & 1 Eliz. 2. c. 55) was an act of the Parliament of the United Kingdom which related to magistrates' courts. The whole act was repealed by section 154 of, and schedule 9 to, the Magistrates' Courts Act 1980.

== Section 1 ==
Section 1 did not apply to a committal for trial under section 1 of the Criminal Justice Act 1967

Section 24(1) of the Criminal Justice Act 1967 restricted the issue of a warrant under this section.

Section 1(2)(e) was inserted by section 56 of, and paragraph 34(2) of Schedule 8 to, the Courts Act 1971.

Section 1(4) was repealed by section 56 of, and part IV of schedule 11 to the Courts Act 1971.

== Section 4 ==
Section 4(2) provided that there was no obligation on examining justices to sit in open court. It was repealed by sections 6(2) and 103(2) of, and Part I of Schedule 7 to, the Criminal Justice Act 1967.

== Section 9 ==
Section 9(2) made special provision about offences dealt with by virtue of section 11 of the Criminal Justice Act 1925 outside the venue of the offence. Section 10(1) of, and paragraph 15(2) of Schedule 2 to, the Criminal Law Act 1967 provided that section 9(2) did not apply to offences committed outside England and Wales, whether within or without territorial waters.

Section 9 was repealed by section 56 of, and part IV of schedule 11 to the Courts Act 1971.

== Section 10 ==
This section was repealed by section 56 of, and part IV of schedule 11 to the Courts Act 1971.

== Section 11 ==
This section was repealed by section 56 of, and part IV of schedule 11 to the Courts Act 1971.

== Section 12 ==
This section was repealed by section 56 of, and part IV of schedule 11 to the Courts Act 1971.

== Section 14 ==
See sections 26(2) and 26(3) and 30 of the Criminal Justice Act 1967

Section 14(3) was amended by section 103(1) of, and paragraph 9 of Schedule 6 to, the Criminal Justice Act 1967.

== Section 15 ==
Section 24(2) of the Criminal Justice Act 1967 restricted the issue of a warrant under section 15(2).

Proviso (a) to section 15(2) was repealed by sections 24(2) and 103(2) of, and Part I of Schedule 7 to, the Criminal Justice Act 1967.

== Section 18 ==
See sections 3(3) and 18(2) and 35 of the Criminal Justice Act 1967.

This section was repealed by section 65(5) of, and Schedule 13 to, the Criminal Law Act 1977.

== Section 19 ==
See section 3(3) and 18(2) of the Criminal Justice Act 1967.

The words "tell him before what court he would be tried if tried by a jury and" in section 19(3) were repealed by section 56 of, and part IV of schedule 11 to the Courts Act 1971.

In section 19(4), the words from the beginning to the words "quarter sessions" where first occurring were repealed by section 10(2) of, and Part III of Schedule 3 to, the Criminal Law Act 1967.

Section 19(4) was amended by section 56 of, and paragraph 34(1) of Schedule 8 to, the Courts Act 1971.

This section was repealed by section 65(5) of, and Schedule 13 to, the Criminal Law Act 1977.

== Section 20 ==
See section 3(3) of the Criminal Justice Act 1967.

== Section 23 ==
Section 23 related to the use in summary trials of evidence given in committal proceedings. It did not apply to any such statement as was mentioned in section 2 of the Criminal Justice Act 1967

== Section 24 ==
This section was repealed by section 65(5) of, and Schedule 13 to, the Criminal Law Act 1977.

== Section 25 ==
The words "tell him before what court he would be tried if tried by a jury and" in section 25(3) were repealed by section 56 of, and part IV of schedule 11 to the Courts Act 1971.

The words "triable by quarter sessions" in section 25(5)(b) were repealed by section 10(2) of, and Part III of Schedule 3 to, the Criminal Law Act 1967.

Section 25(5) was amended by section 56 of, and paragraph 34(1) of Schedule 8 to, the Courts Act 1971.

This section was repealed by section 65(5) of, and Schedule 13 to, the Criminal Law Act 1977.

== Section 26 ==
This section related to the remand of a defendant for medical examination and to the requirement of such an examination on committing a defendant for trial on bail.

The requirements of sections 18(1) and (2) of the Criminal Justice Act 1967 did not apply to the adjournment of a trial by a magistrates' court under section 26 of this Act, for the purpose of enabling a medical examination and report to be made on the defendant, if it appeared to the court that it would be impracticable to obtain such a report without remanding the defendant in custody.

From 1967, section 2(2) of the Costs in Criminal Cases Act 1952 (as substituted by section 32(1) of the Criminal Justice Act 1967) applied to a request to a registered medical practitioner to make a written or oral report on the medical condition of an offender or defendant, made by a court in exercise of the powers conferred on it by section 26 of this Act.

Section 26(1) was amended by section 103(1) of, and paragraph 10 of Schedule 6 to, the Criminal Justice Act 1967.

== Section 28 ==
This section related to committal for sentence.

See section 20 of the Criminal Justice Act 1967.

Section 56 of the Criminal Justice Act 1967 applied to this section.

Sections 28(1) and (4) were amended by section 103(1) of, and paragraph 11 of Schedule 6 to, the Criminal Justice Act 1967.

Section 28(1) was amended by section 56 of, and paragraph 34(1) of Schedule 8 to, the Courts Act 1971.

== Section 29 ==
This section related to committal for sentence.

See section 20 of the Criminal Justice Act 1967.

Section 56 of the Criminal Justice Act 1967 applied to this section.

And see section 62(7) of that Act.

Section 29 was amended by section 103(1) of, and paragraph 12 of Schedule 6 to, the Criminal Justice Act 1967.

== Section 32 ==
This section was repealed by section 65(5) of, and Schedule 13 to, the Criminal Law Act 1977.

== Section 33 ==
This section was repealed by section 33(3) of, and Part III of Schedule 3 to the Theft Act 1968.

== Section 34 ==
The words "of assize or quarter sessions" were repealed by section 56 of, and part IV of schedule 11 to the Courts Act 1971.

== Section 40 ==
This section provided for the taking of finger prints from a person who had attained the age of fourteen years and who had been taken into custody and charged with an offence.

From 1967, this section applied to any person of not less than fourteen who appeared before a magistrates' court in answer to a summons for any offence punishable with imprisonment.

From 1967, the references to finger prints in this section were construed as including a reference to palm prints.

== Section 67 ==
As to section 67(2), see section 47(6) of the Criminal Justice Act 1967.

== Section 69 ==
This section was repealed by sections 44(1) and 103(2) of, and Part I of Schedule 7 to, the Criminal Justice Act 1967.

== Section 70 ==
Section 70(1) was repealed by section 44(1) and 103(2) of, and Part I of Schedule 7 to, the Criminal Justice Act 1967.

Section 70(2) was amended by section 103(1) of, and paragraph 13 of Schedule 6 to, the Criminal Justice Act 1967.

== Section 72A ==
The words "the Crown Court" were substituted for the words "a court of assize or quarter sessions" by section 56 of, and

paragraph 34(3) of Schedule 8 to, the Courts Act 1971.

See section 48(1) of the Criminal Justice Act 1967.

Section 72A(2) was amended by section 103(1) of, and paragraph 14 of Schedule 6 to, the Criminal Justice Act 1967.

Section 72A(3) was amended by section 103(1) of, and paragraph 15 of Schedule 6 to, the Criminal Justice Act 1967.

== Section 72B ==
The words "the Crown Court" were substituted for the words "a court of assize or quarter sessions" by section 56 of, and paragraph 34(3) of Schedule 8 to, the Courts Act 1971.

Section 72B(3) was inserted by section 103(1) of, and paragraph 16 of Schedule 6 to, the Criminal Justice Act 1967.

== Section 74 ==
See section 79(3) of the Criminal Justice Act 1967.

== Section 83 ==
Section 56 and Schedule 9 to the Courts Act 1971 substituted a reference to the Crown Court.

== Section 84 ==
This section was repealed by section 56 of, and part IV of schedule 11 to the Courts Act 1971.

== Section 85 ==
Section 85(1) was repealed by section 56 of, and paragraph 34(4)(a) of Schedule 8 to, and part IV of schedule 11 to the Courts Act 1971. It was superseded by the provisions of the Courts Act 1971 authorising the making of Crown Court rules.

Section 85(2A) was inserted by section 56 of, and paragraph 34(4)(b) of Schedule 8 to, the Courts Act 1971.

== Section 86 ==
This section was amended by section 56 of, and paragraph 34(1) of Schedule 8 to, the Courts Act 1971.

== Section 89 ==
This section was amended by section 56 of, paragraph 34(1) of Schedule 8 to, the Courts Act 1971.

== Section 91 ==
See section 74(11) of the Criminal Justice Act 1967.

== Section 95 ==
See section 18(4) of the Criminal Justice Act 1967.

== Section 96 ==
See section 47(8) of the Criminal Justice Act 1967.

Section 96(4) was amended by section 103(1) of, and paragraph 17 of Schedule 6 to, the Criminal Justice Act 1967.

== Section 98 ==
Sections 98(2) and (3) were amended by section 103(1) of, and paragraph 18 of Schedule 6 to, the Criminal Justice Act 1967.

== Section 102 ==
Section 102(3) was repealed by section 65(5) of, and Schedule 13 to, the Criminal Law Act 1977.

== Section 104 ==
See section 90(2) of the Criminal Justice Act 1967.

The proviso to this section was repealed by section 65(5) of, and Schedule 13 to, the Criminal Law Act 1977.

== Section 110 ==
Section 110(1) was amended by section 103(1) of, and paragraph 19 of Schedule 6 to, the Criminal Justice Act 1967.

== Section 111 ==
Section 111 was amended by section 103(1) of, and paragraph 20 of Schedule 6 to, the Criminal Justice Act 1967.

== Section 113 ==
Section 113(2) was repealed by section 103(2) of, and Part I of Schedule 7 to, the Criminal Justice Act 1967.

== Section 114 ==
Sections 114(1)(c) to (e) and 114(2) were repealed by section 103(2) of, and Part I of Schedule 7 to, the Criminal Justice Act 1967.

== Section 122 ==
The words "officers of the Crown Court" were substituted for the words "clerks of assize and clerks of the peace" by section 56 of, and paragraph 34(5) of Schedule 8 to, the Courts Act 1971.

Section 122(1)(c) was amended by section 56 of, and paragraph 34(1) of Schedule 8 to, the Courts Act 1971.

== Section 125 ==
This section was repealed by section 65(5) of, and Schedule 13 to, the Criminal Law Act 1977.

== Section 126 ==
Section 126(7) was repealed by section 10(2) of, and Part III of Schedule 3 to, the Criminal Law Act 1967.

The definition of "clerk of assize" in section 126(1) was repealed by section 56 of, and part IV of schedule 11 to the Courts Act 1971.

== Section 127 ==
Section 127(2) was repealed by section 65(5) of, and Schedule 13 to, the Criminal Law Act 1977.

== Section 129 ==
This section was repealed by section 56 of, and part IV of schedule 11 to the Courts Act 1971.

== Schedule 1 ==
See section 27 of the Criminal Justice Act 1967.

Entries numbers 1, 5 and 6 were repealed by section 33(3) of, and Part III of Schedule 3 to the Theft Act 1968.

Paragraph 8 was substituted by section 33 of, and Part III of Schedule 2 to, the Theft Act 1968.

The word "four" in paragraph 11 was repealed by section 10(2) of, and Part III of Schedule 3 to, the Criminal Law Act 1967, except in relation to offences committed before the commencement of that Act.

Paragraph 11 was substituted by section 29(2) of the Theft Act 1968.

Paragraph 15 was repealed by section 3(2) of, and Schedule 2 to, the Suicide Act 1961, except in respect to proceedings commenced before the commencement of that Act.

This Schedule was repealed by section 65(5) of, and Schedule 13 to, the Criminal Law Act 1977.

== Schedule 2 ==
Paragraph 6 was repealed by section 56 of, and part IV of schedule 11 to the Courts Act 1971.

The words "the trial by jury of certain summary offences" in paragraph 8 were repealed by section 65(5) of, and Schedule 13 to, the Criminal Law Act 1977.

== Schedule 3 ==
The table in paragraph 1 was substituted by section 93(1) of the Criminal Justice Act 1967.

Paragraph 3 was amended by section 93(2) of the Criminal Justice Act 1967. It was repealed by section 65(5) of, and Schedule 13 to, the Criminal Law Act 1977.

== Schedule 4 ==
The following headings, and all the entries therein, were repealed by section 103(2) of and Part I of Schedule 7 to the Criminal Justice Act 1967, that is to say:

- "Committal for trial"
- "Summary trial"
- "Conviction"
- "Examination"
- "Extradition Act 1873 (36 & 37 Vict. c. 60) s. 5"
- "Information"
- "Recognizance"

In the heading "Attendance", the words "or to take an examination elsewhere than in court" were repealed by section 103(2) of and Part I of Schedule 7 to the Criminal Justice Act 1967.

In the heading "Copy", the first two entries and the word "other" in the third entry were repealed by section 103(2) of and Part I of Schedule 7 to the Criminal Justice Act 1967.

In the heading "Order", the entry beginning "Order in case" were repealed by section 103(2) of and Part I of Schedule 7 to the Criminal Justice Act 1967.

In the heading "Summons", the words from "to include" to "time" were repealed by section 103(2) of and Part I of Schedule 7 to the Criminal Justice Act 1967.

In the heading "Warrant", in the entry beginning "To commit", the words "conviction or" in both places where they occur were repealed by section 103(2) of and Part I of Schedule 7 to the Criminal Justice Act 1967.

In the Note, the words "for re-swearing any person to any examination, or" were repealed by section 103(2) of and Part I of Schedule 7 to the Criminal Justice Act 1967.

== Schedule 5 ==
The words "clerk of assize, clerk of the peace or other" in the amendment of the Criminal Law Amendment Act 1867 were repealed by section 56 of, and part IV of schedule 11 to the Courts Act 1971.

The amendments of the Assizes Relief Act 1889, the Summary Jurisdiction (Appeals) Act 1933 and sections 20 and 29 of the Criminal Justice Act 1948 were repealed by section 56 of, and part IV of schedule 11 to the Courts Act 1971.

== Part III ==
Sections 44(2) to (11) of the Criminal Justice Act 1967 had effect with respect to the issue of a warrant of commitment under this Part, for default in paying a sum adjudged to be paid by a conviction of a magistrates' court.

See also section 50 of the Criminal Justice Act 1967.

== Repealed enactments ==
Section 132(1) of the act repealed 64 enactments, listed in the sixth schedule to the act.

Citation	Short title	Extent of repeal
9 Will. 3. c. 35	Blasphemy Act 1697	In section two the words "upon oath".
6 Anne c. 41	Succession to the Crown Act 1707	In section three the words "upon oath".
15 Geo. 2. c. 33	Starr and Bent Act 1741	In section six the words "upon oath" and from "which oath" to "administer".
19 Geo. 2. c. 21	Profane Oaths Act 1745	In section four the words "given upon oath".
33 Geo. 3. c. 55	Parish Officers Act 1793	The words "upon oath".
7 Geo. 4. c. 64	Criminal Law Act 1826	Sections twelve and thirteen in relation to proceedings before magistrates' courts.
10 Geo. 4. c. 44	Metropolitan Police Act 1829	Section nine.
3 & 4 Will. 4. c. 90	Lighting and Watching Act 1833	In section fifty-six the words "upon oath".
2 & 3 Vict. c. 47	Metropolitan Police Act 1839	Sections seventy to seventy-two. In section seventy-seven the words from "it shall be lawful" to "due and".
2 & 3 Vict. c. 71	Metropolitan Police Courts Act 1839	Sections nineteen to twenty-two. Section thirty-one. Section thirty-five. Section thirty-six so far as it relates to the remand of persons to appear or be brought before a metropolitan stipendiary magistrate.
3 & 4 Vict. c. 84	Metropolitan Police Courts Act 1840	Section eight.
3 & 4 Vict. c. 88	County Police Act 1840	Section thirty-three.
3 & 4 Vict. c. 97	Railway Regulation Act 1840	In section thirteen the words "upon oath". In section sixteen the words "upon oath".
5 & 6 Vict. c. 55	Railway Regulation Act 1842	In section seventeen the words "upon oath".
6 & 7 Vict. c. 40	Hosiery Act 1843	In section nineteen the words "on oath".
7 & 8 Vict. c. 101	Poor Law Amendment Act 1844	Section four. In section five the words from "and the clerk" onwards. Section seventy.
8 & 9 Vict. c. 10	Bastardy Act 1845	Sections four and five. Sections seven to ten.
10 & 11 Vict. c. 89	Town Police Clauses Act 1847	Sections seventeen to nineteen.
11 & 12 Vict. c. 42	Indictable Offences Act 1848	The whole act, except sections twelve to fifteen, and thirty to thirty-two and Form (K.) in the Schedule. In section thirty, the words from "and nothing" onwards.
11 & 12 Vict. c. 43	Summary Jurisdiction Act 1848	The whole act except section thirty.
14 & 15 Vict. c. 49	Preliminary Inquiries Act 1851	In section five the words from "and on conviction" to "county rate".
14 & 15 Vict. c. 55	Criminal Justice Administration Act 1851	Section twelve.
16 & 17 Vict. c. 30	Criminal Procedure Act 1853	In section two the words from "or before any justice" to "place" where that word next occurs and the words from "and upon notice" onwards.
16 & 17 Vict. c. 119	Betting Act 1853	Section eight.
17 & 18 Vict. c. 38	Gaming Houses Act 1854	Section seven.
20 & 21 Vict. c. 43	Summary Jurisdiction Act 1857	Sections two to five. Section nine. Sections thirteen and fourteen.
21 & 22 Vict. c. 73	Stipendiary Magistrates Act 1858	Section five.
24 & 25 Vict. c. 51	Metropolitan Police Act 1861	In section three the words from "and the said" onwards.
26 & 27 Vict. c. 77	Summary Jurisdiction Act 1863	The whole act.
27 & 28 Vict. c. 55	Metropolitan Police Act 1864	Section two.
30 & 31 Vict. c. 35	Criminal Law Amendment Act 1867	Section four.
35 & 36 Vict. c. 65	Bastardy Laws Amendment Act 1872	Section six to "shall have taken the same". Section nine. In section three the words from "acting for" to "reside" and the words from "and if such application" onwards. In section four the words from the beginning to "before the petty session", the words "and of such costs as may have been incurred in the obtaining of such order" and the words from "and if at any time after" onwards.
36 & 37 Vict. c. 9	Bastardy Laws Amendment Act 1873	The whole act.
42 & 43 Vict. c. 49	Summary Jurisdiction Act 1879	The whole act, except sections two, thirty-one and forty; and in section thirty-one, in subsection (1), paragraphs (ii) and (iv), in paragraph (vii) the words from "and any order" to "jurisdiction" and paragraph (x).
45 & 46 Vict. c. 50	Municipal Corporations Act 1882	Section two hundred and twenty-seven.
47 & 48 Vict. c. 43	Summary Jurisdiction Act 1884	The whole act.
50 & 51 Vict. c. 28	Merchandise Marks Act 1887	In section two, subsection (6).
51 & 52 Vict. c. 41	Local Government Act 1888	In section forty-two, in subsection (12), the words "and appoint an occasional court-house and" and "or any business transacted at such court-house".
52 & 53 Vict. c. 12	Assizes Relief Act 1889	In section one, in subsection (1), the words from the beginning to "otherwise to direct; and". In section two the words from the beginning to "gaol delivery; and".
58 & 59 Vict. c. 39	Summary Jurisdiction (Married Women) Act 1895	In section five, paragraph (d).
61 & 62 Vict. c. 7	Bail Act 1898	The whole act.
62 & 63 Vict. c. 22	Summary Jurisdiction Act 1899	The whole act.
2 Edw. 7. c. 28	Licensing Act 1902	In section five, paragraph (d) of subsection (2).
4 & 5 Geo. 5. c. 6	Affiliation Orders Act 1914	Sections one and five.
4 & 5 Geo. 5. c. 58	Criminal Justice Administration Act 1914	Sections one to six. Sections twelve and thirteen. Section eighteen. Section nineteen so far as it relates to bail granted by a magistrates' court. Sections twenty to twenty-three. Section twenty-five. In section twenty-eight, subsections (1) and (4). Sections twenty-nine to thirty-three. Section thirty-seven. The First Schedule.
10 & 11 Geo. 5. c. 81	Administration of Justice Act 1920	Section four.
13 & 14 Geo. 5. c. 23	Bastardy Act 1923	Section one.
15 & 16 Geo. 5. c. 86	Criminal Justice Act 1925	In section eleven, subsections (1) and (2) so far as they relate to proceedings before magistrates' courts, and in the said subsection (1) the words from "Provided that" onwards. In section twelve, subsections (1) to (3), the first paragraph of subsection (4) and subsections (5), (7) and (8). In section thirteen, subsections (1), (2) and (5). In section fourteen, subsections (1) and (5). Section twenty-four. Sections twenty-six and twenty-seven. Section twenty-nine. Sections thirty-one and thirty-two. In section thirty-three, subsections (1), (2) and (5). Sections forty-four and forty-five. The Second Schedule.
18 & 19 Geo. 5. c. 43	Agricultural Credits Act 1928	In section eleven, subsection (2).
19 & 20 Geo. 5. c. 38	Bastardy (Witness Process) Act 1929	The whole act.
23 & 24 Geo. 5. c. 12	Children and Young Persons Act 1933	In section thirty-five, in subsection (1), the words "a court of summary jurisdiction or before" and "acting under the Indictable Offences Act, 1848". In section forty-eight, subsection (4) from the beginning to "offences". Section sixty. In section sixty-two, in subsection (3), the words from "and where" onwards. In section eighty-eight, paragraph (d) of subsection (2). The Third Schedule.
23 & 24 Geo. 5. c. 38	Summary Jurisdiction (Appeals) Act 1933	In section three, in subsection (1), the words from "it shall not" to "notice of appeal and", and subsections (2) and (3). In section four, subsections (1) and (3) and, in subsection (2), paragraphs (a) and (d) and, in paragraph (c), the words from the beginning to "accordingly" and the words from "and the provisions" onwards.
23 & 24 Geo. 5. c. 42	Service of Process (Justices) Act 1933	The whole act.
25 & 26 Geo. 5. c. 46	Money Payments (Justices Procedure) Act 1935	Sections one to eight. Section nine from the beginning to the words "effect and". In section eleven, in subsection (1), paragraph (a), the words "for which the competent court acts or", the words "as the case may be", in both places where they occur, and the words "before that court or". Sections twelve and thirteen. Section fifteen.
26 Geo. 5 & 1 Edw. 8. c. 50	Public Health (London) Act 1936	Section seventy-two from the beginning to "1879".
1 Edw. 8 & 1 Geo. 6. c. 58	Summary Procedure (Domestic Proceedings) Act 1937	The whole act.
1 & 2 Geo. 6. c. 63	Administration of Justice (Miscellaneous Provisions) Act 1938	Section six. In the Second Schedule, the entries relating to the Summary Jurisdiction Act, 1857, and the Summary Jurisdiction Act, 1879.
8 & 9 Geo. 6. c. 41	Family Allowances Act 1945	In section four, subsection (4). In the Second Schedule, paragraphs 5 to 8.
11 & 12 Geo. 6. c. 10	Emergency Laws (Miscellaneous Provisions) Act 1947	In section twenty-six, subsection (6).
11 & 12 Geo. 6. c. 43	Children Act 1948	In section eleven, in subsection (1), the words from "and section twenty-three" onwards.
11 & 12 Geo. 6. c. 58	Criminal Justice Act 1948	In section seventeen, subsection (1) from the beginning to the words "age and", in subsection (3), the words "or a court of summary jurisdiction" and the words from "and if the court" onwards, and subsections (4) and (5). In section eighteen, subsection (3). In section twenty, subsection (3), and, in subsection (7), the words "and before a person is committed for sentence under subsection (3) of this section" and the words from "and if the court" onwards. Sections twenty-four to twenty-six. In section twenty-seven, subsections (2) and (3). Section twenty-eight. In section twenty-nine, subsection (1). Sections thirty-two and thirty-three. Section thirty-six. Section forty. In section forty-two, subsections (2) and (3). Section sixty-seven. The Ninth Schedule so far as it amends any enactment repealed by this Act.
12, 13 & 14 Geo. 6. c. 99	Married Women (Maintenance) Act 1949	Section four.
12, 13 & 14 Geo. 6. c. 101	Justices of the Peace Act 1949	In section eleven, in subsection (5), the words "or any jurisdiction to hear and determine domestic proceedings", paragraph (b) and the word "and" immediately preceding it; in subsection (6), the words "and the Summary Procedure (Domestic Proceedings) Act, 1937" and "and the said Act of 1937"; and, in subsection (7), the words from "the expression" to "1937 and". In section fifteen, subsections (4) and (6). In section nineteen, subsection (12). In section twenty-one, subsection (1) from the words "and section four" onwards, and subsections (2), (3) and (6). In section twenty-five, in subsection (6), the words from "to appoint" in the first place where they occur to "or the power".
14 Geo. 6. c. 26	Adoption Act 1950	Subsections (2) and (3) of section eight as respects magistrates' courts.

== Subsequent developments ==
Section 34 of the act were repealed by section 64(2) of, and part II of schedule 6 to, the Criminal Justice Act 1972, which came into force on 1 January 1973.

Section 132(1) of the act was repealed by section 1 of, and part XI of the schedule to, the Statute Law (Repeals) Act 1974, which came into force on 27 June 1974.

The whole act was repealed by section 154(3) of, and schedule 9 to, the Magistrates' Court Act 1980, which came into force on 6 July 1981.

== See also ==
- Magistrates' Courts Act

== Bibliography ==
- Halsbury's Statutes. Third Edition. Volume 21. Page 181 et seq.
