= Metropolitan Police Act 1833 =

Act of the Parliament of the United Kingdom

- Act of Parliament
- Parliament of the United Kingdom
- Long title: An Act to authorise the Issue of a Sum of Money out of the Consolidated Fund towards the Support of the Metropolitan Police
- Citation: 3 & 4 Will. 4 c. 89
- Territorial extent: United Kingdom

Dates
- Royal assent: 28 August 1833
- Commencement: 28 August 1833 (Note: The Acts of Parliament (Commencement) Act 1793.)
- Repealed: 31 July 1868
Other legislation
Amends	Metropolitan Police Act 1829
Repealed by	Police Rate Act 1868

Status: Repealed

Text of statute as originally enacted

The Metropolitan Police Act 1833 (3 & 4 Will. 4 c. 89) was an act of the Parliament of the United Kingdom. The act was the second of the Metropolitan Police Acts, granted royal assent on 28 August 1833. The Metropolitan Police had previously solely been paid by the Rates from parishes within the Metropolitan Police District, but the act enabled that to be supplemented by payments from the Consolidated Fund of up to £60,000 a year.

== Subsequent developments ==
The whole act was repealed by the Police Rate Act 1868 (31 & 32 Vict. c. 67), which came into force on 31 July 1868.
