= Exportation of Arms Act 1900 =

Act of the Parliament of the United Kingdom

Exportation of Arms Act 1900 (Note: Section 1(2).)
- Act of Parliament
- Parliament of the United Kingdom
- Long title: An Act to amend the Law relating to the Exportation of Arms, Ammunition, and Military and Naval Stores.
- Citation: 63 & 64 Vict. c. 44
- Territorial extent: United Kingdom

Dates
- Royal assent: 6 August 1900
- Commencement: 6 August 1900 (Note: The Acts of Parliament (Commencement) Act 1793.)
- Repealed: 2 May 1986
Other legislation
Amended by	Customs (Exportation Restriction) Act 1914
Repealed by	Statute Law (Repeals) Act 1986
Relates to	Customs and Inland Revenue Act 1879

Status: Repealed

Text of statute as originally enacted

The Exportation of Arms Act 1900 (63 & 64 Vict. c. 44) was an act of the Parliament of the United Kingdom, given royal assent on 6 August 1900 and repealed in 1986.

It provided that the monarch, by proclamation, had the power to prohibit the export of certain classes of military equipment, or "any article ... capable of being converted into or made useful in increasing the quantity" of such equipment, when it was necessary to prevent the equipment being used against British or allied citizens or military forces.

The material so proclaimed was to be considered "prohibited goods" under the Customs and Inland Revenue Act 1879 (42 & 43 Vict. c. 21), and dealt with as though it were listed in section 8 of that Act.

== Subsequent developments ==
The whole act act was repealed by section 1(1) of, and part IV of schedule 1 to, the Statute Law (Repeals) Act 1986, which came into force on 2 May 1986.
