= Evidence (Proceedings in other Jurisdictions) Act 1975 =

Act of the Parliament of the United Kingdom

Evidence (Proceedings in other Jurisdictions) Act 1975 (Note: Section 10(1).)
- Act of Parliament
- Parliament of the United Kingdom
- Long title: An Act to make new provision for enabling the High Court, the Court of Session and the High Court of Justice in Northern Ireland to assist in obtaining evidence required for the purposes of proceedings in other jurisdictions; to extend the powers of those courts to issue process effective throughout the United Kingdom for securing the attendance of witnesses; and for purposes connected with those matters.
- Citation: 1975 c. 34
- Territorial extent: United Kingdom (Note: Section 10(3).)

Dates
- Royal assent: 22 May 1975
- Commencement: 4 May 1976 (Note: Section 10(3). The Evidence (Proceedings in Other Jurisdictions) Act 1975 (Commencement) Order 1976 (SI 1976/429).)
Other legislation
| Amends | Foreign Jurisdiction Act 1890; False Oaths (Scotland) Act 1933 |
| Repeals/revokes | Foreign Tribunals Evidence Act 1856; Evidence by Commission Act 1859; Evidence by Commission Act 1885 |
| Amended by | Judicature (Northern Ireland) Act 1978; Perjury (Northern Ireland) Order 1979; County Courts (Northern Ireland) Order 1980; Senior Courts Act 1981; County Courts Act 1984; Criminal Justice (International Co-operation) Act 1990; Criminal Justice and Licensing (Scotland) Act 2010 |

Status: Amended

Text of statute as originally enacted

Revised text of statute as amended

Text of the Evidence (Proceedings in other Jurisdictions) Act 1975 as in force today (including any amendments) within the United Kingdom, from legislation.gov.uk.

The Evidence (Proceedings in other Jurisdictions) Act 1975 (c. 34) is an act of the Parliament of the United Kingdom, the long title of which is "An Act to make new provision for enabling the High Court, the Court of Session and the High Court of Justice in Northern Ireland to assist in obtaining evidence required for the purposes of proceedings in other jurisdictions; to extend the powers of those courts to issue process effective throughout the United Kingdom for securing the attendance of witnesses; and for purposes connected with those matters."

The act was passed in order to implement the Hague Evidence Convention of 18 March 1970 into English law. The Hague Evidence Convention applies only to civil proceedings, but until June 1991 the act also contained a provision for the courts to deal with letters rogatory in criminal matters, as well as international proceedings such as proceedings in the International Court of Justice.
