= Metropolitan Police Act 1864 =

Act of the Parliament of the United Kingdom

Metropolitan Police Act 1864 (Note: The citation of this act by this short title was authorised by section 1 of, and the first schedule to, the Short Titles Act 1896. Due to the repeal of those provisions it is now authorised by section 19(2) of the Interpretation Act 1978.)
- Act of Parliament
- Parliament of the United Kingdom
- Long title: An Act for the better Regulation of Street Music within the Metropolitan Police District.
- Citation: 27 & 28 Vict. c. 55
- Territorial extent: United Kingdom

Dates
- Royal assent: 25 July 1864
- Commencement: 25 July 1864 (Note: The Acts of Parliament (Commencement) Act 1793.)
- Repealed: 16 November 1989
Other legislation
Amends	Metropolitan Police Act 1839
Amended by	Magistrates' Courts Act 1952
Repealed by	Statute Law (Repeals) Act 1989

Status: Repealed

Text of statute as originally enacted

The Metropolitan Police Act 1864 (27 & 28 Vict. c. 55) was an act of the Parliament of the United Kingdom. The act was one of a series of Metropolitan Police Acts.

== Provisions ==
The provisions of the act include:

- Repealing section 57 of the Metropolitan Police Act 1839 (2 & 3 Vict. c. 47) and replacing it with a section allowing street musicians to be fined no more than forty shillings or to be imprisoned for no more than three days.

== Subsequent developments ==
The whole act was repealed by section 1(1) of, and part IV of schedule 1 to, the Statute Law (Repeals) Act 1989, which came into force on 16 November 1989.

== Bibliography ==
- "Third reading of the act".
