= Metropolitan Police Act 1839 =

Act of the Parliament of the United Kingdom

Metropolitan Police Act 1839 (Note: The citation of this act by this short title was authorised by section 1 of, and the first schedule to, the Short Titles Act 1896. Due to the repeal of those provisions it is now authorised by section 19(2) of the Interpretation Act 1978.)
- Act of Parliament
- Parliament of the United Kingdom
- Long title: An Act for further improving the Police in and near the Metropolis.
- Citation: 2 & 3 Vict. c. 47
- Territorial extent: United Kingdom

Dates
- Royal assent: 17 August 1839
- Commencement: 17 August 1839 (Note: The Acts of Parliament (Commencement) Act 1793.)
Other legislation
Amends	Westminster Act 1756
Repeals/revokes	Thefts upon the Thames Act 1762; Horse Patrol, Metropolis Act 1836
Amended by	Metropolitan Police Act 1856; Metropolitan Police Act 1861; Metropolitan Police Act 1864; Licensing Act 1872; Statute Law Revision Act 1874 (No. 2); Metropolitan Police Staff (Superannuation) Act 1875; Statute Law Revision Act 1875; Superannuation Act 1887; Police Act 1890; Statute Law Revision (No. 2) Act 1890; Public Health (London) Act 1891; Removal of Matter Act 1906; Supreme Court of Judicature (Consolidation) Act 1925; Police Act 1946; Justices of the Peace Act 1949; Miscellaneous Financial Provisions Act 1950; Magistrates' Courts Act 1952; Licensing Act 1953; Metropolitan Police Act 1839 (Amendment) Act 1958; Street Offences Act 1959; Betting and Gaming Act 1960; Penalties for Drunkenness Act 1962; Betting, Gaming and Lotteries Act 1963; Criminal Justice (Scotland) Act 1963; Administration of Justice Act 1964; Police Act 1964; Theatres Act 1968; Theft Act 1968; Justices of the Peace Act 1968; Post Office Act 1969; Criminal Damage Act 1971; Road Traffic Act 1972; Administration of Justice Act 1973; Statute Law (Repeals) Act 1973; Consumer Credit Act 1974; Bail Act 1976; Statute Law (Repeals) Act 1978; Indecent Displays (Control) Act 1981; Criminal Justice Act 1982; Road Traffic Regulation Act 1984; Police and Criminal Evidence Act 1984; Statute Law (Repeals) Act 1986; Public Order Act 1986; Statute Law (Repeals) Act 1989; Criminal Justice Act 1991; Statute Law (Repeals) Act 1995; Law Officers Act 1997; Statute Law (Repeals) Act 1998; Access to Justice Act 1999; Licensing Act 2003; Courts Act 2003; Gambling Act 2005; Animal Welfare Act 2006
Relates to	Metropolitan Police Act 1829; City of London Police Act 1839

Status: Partially repealed

Text of statute as originally enacted

Revised text of statute as amended

Text of the Metropolitan Police Act 1839 as in force today (including any amendments) within the United Kingdom, from legislation.gov.uk.

Metropolitan Police Act 1839 (Amendment) Act 1958 (Note: Section 2.)
- Act of Parliament
- Parliament of the United Kingdom
- Long title: An Act to amend section fifty-four of the Metropolitan Police Act, 1839, for the purpose of increasing the maximum penalty for threatening, abusive or insulting words or behaviour in any thoroughfare or public place.
- Citation: 6 & 7 Eliz. 2. c. 48
- Territorial extent: United Kingdom

Dates
- Royal assent: 23 July 1958
- Commencement: 23 July 1958
- Repealed: 1 January 1968
Other legislation
Amends	Metropolitan Police Act 1839
Repealed by	Criminal Justice Act 1967

Status: Repealed

Text of statute as originally enacted

The Metropolitan Police Act 1839 (2 & 3 Vict. c. 47) is an act of the Parliament of the United Kingdom. The act enlarged the district of, and gave greatly increased powers to the Metropolitan Police established by the Metropolitan Police Act 1829 ( 10 Geo. 4. c. 44). It is one of the Metropolitan Police Acts 1829 to 1895.

== Provisions ==
Section 2 of the act allowed for the enlargement of the Metropolitan Police District to include places in a radius of 15 miles from Charing Cross.

Section 5 of the act gave constables of the Metropolitan Police all "powers and privileges of constabulary" in the counties of Berkshire and Buckinghamshire and on the River Thames within or adjoining Middlesex, Surrey, Berkshire, Essex, Kent and the City of London (the MPA 1829 had already given them constabulary powers within Middlesex, Surrey, Essex and Kent).

The act gave the police force powers over shipping arriving in the Port of London and using the Thames. Among these powers were:

- Power to inspect vessels to prevent smuggling
- Power to seize unlawful quantities of gunpowder
- Powers to seize guns loaded with ball

A number of activities were to regulated within the Metropolitan Police District:

- Fairs were only to be open during agreed hours.
- Public houses were to closed on Sundays, Christmas Day and on Good Friday until 1 pm. No alcoholic drink was to be sold to persons under 16 years of age.
- Police were empowered to enter unlicensed theatres.
- Police could enter premises where bear baiting or cockfighting were being carried on, and fine the participants £5.
- Police were allowed to enter gaming houses.
- Regulations could be made to prevent the obstruction of parades and processions.

Section 54 of the act enumerated a long list of "Nuisances by Persons in Thoroughfares" that were now prohibited. Among the outlawed activities, for which the miscreant could be taken into custody and fined, were:

- "Furious Driving".
- Driving carts on the footway.
- Selling or distributing "profane, indecent or obscene books, papers, prints, drawings, paintings or representations", or singing any songs or ballads with similar content or using language "to the annoyance of pedestrians or passengers".
- Threatening or abusive behaviour or words.
- The blowing of horns (except by guards and postmen of the General Post Office).
- Discharging firearms, setting fireworks or lighting bonfires.
- "Wantonly disturbing" persons by ringing doorbells, knocking on doors or unlawfully extinguishing lamps.
- Flying kites or playing games to the annoyance of others.
- Making slides upon ice or snow to the danger of pedestrians.

The act also outlawed the use of dog carts, obliged street musicians to move on when asked and allowed the imprisonment of "drunkards guilty of riotous or indecent behaviour".

== Subsequent developments ==
In section 4 of the act, the words "although they may not be qualified by estate" were repealed by section 8(2) of, and part I of schedule 5 to, the Justices of the Peace Act 1968, which came into force on 25 October 1968.

Section 51, in section 54, in paragraph 9, the words " during the time of divine service, and "., and sections 56 and 59 of the act were repealed by section 1(1) of, and part VI of schedule 1 to, the Statute Law (Repeals) Act 1973, which came into force on 18 July 1973.

Section 10 of the act was repealed by section 1(1) of, and part XI of schedule 1 to, the Statute Law (Repeals) Act 1978, which came into force on 31 July 1978.

Sections 32 and 74 of the act was repealed by section 1(1) of, and group 3 of part I of schedule 1 to, the Statute Law (Repeals) Act 1986, which came into force on 2 May 1986.
