= Metropolitan Police Act 1899 =

Act of the Parliament of the United Kingdom

Metropolitan Police Act 1899 (Note: Section 2.)
- Act of Parliament
- Parliament of the United Kingdom
- Long title: An Act to amend the Law with respect to the Salaries and Allowances of the Commissioner, Receiver, and Assistant Commissioners of the Metropolitan Police.
- Citation: 62 & 63 Vict. c. 26
- Territorial extent: United Kingdom

Dates
- Royal assent: 9 August 1899
- Commencement: 1 October 1899 (Note: Section 1(5).)
Other legislation
| Amends | Metropolitan Police Courts Act 1839; Metropolitan Police Act 1856; Metropolitan Police (Receiver) Act 1867; Police Bate Act 1868 |
| Amended by | Statute Law Revision Act 1908; Statute Law (Repeals) Act 1989; Greater London Authority Act 1999 |

Status: Partially repealed

Text of statute as originally enacted

Revised text of statute as amended

Text of the Metropolitan Police Act 1899 as in force today (including any amendments) within the United Kingdom, from legislation.gov.uk.

The Metropolitan Police Act 1899 (62 & 63 Vict. c. 26) is an act of the Parliament of the United Kingdom. The act was the last of a series of 19th century Metropolitan Police Acts.

It dealt with the Metropolitan Police's Commissioner, Assistant Commissioners and Receiver. It allowed for the Secretary of State and the Treasury to set the pay of the Commissioner, Receiver (Section 1.1) and the Assistant Commissioners (Section 1.2). It allowed for the Assistant Commissioners' wages to be paid out of the Metropolitan Police Fund and/or moneys provided by Parliament, with an annual maximum of £1,200 on the amount Parliament had to allocate for that purpose (Section 1.2).

It exempted from the Act's provisions the Registrar of Anthropometric Measurements and anyone who wrote to the Secretary of State within a month of the Act's passing asking to remain on his salary and allowances as on 1 January 1899 as opposed to the salary provided for under the Act (Section 1.3). It also provided for the Act to come into effect on 1 October 1899.
