= Statute Law (Repeals) Act 1986 =

Act of the Parliament of the United Kingdom

Statute Law (Repeals) Act 1986 (Note: Section 3.)
- Act of Parliament
- Parliament of the United Kingdom
- Long title: An Act to promote the reform of the statute law by the repeal, in accordance with recommendations of the Law Commission and the Scottish Law Commission, of certain enactments which (except in so far as their effect is preserved) are no longer of practical utility, and to make other provision in connection with the repeal of those enactments.
- Citation: 1986 c. 12
- Introduced by: Lord Hailsham of Saint Marylebone LC
- Territorial extent: United Kingdom; Channel Islands; Isle of Man; (Note: Section 2.)

Dates
- Royal assent: 2 May 1986
- Commencement: 2 May 1986 (Note: Section 4(b) of the Interpretation Act 1978.)
Other legislation
Amends	Sheriff Courts Consignations (Scotland) Act 1893; Trade Marks Act 1938; Patents, Designs, Copyright and Trade Marks (Emergency) Act 1939; Representation of the People Act 1948; See § Repealed enactments
Repeals/revokes	See § Repealed enactments
Amended by	Parliamentary Constituencies Act 1986; Trade Marks Act 1994
Relates to	See Statute Law (Repeals) Act

Status: Amended

Text of statute as originally enacted

The Statute Law (Repeals) Act 1986 (c. 12) is an act of the Parliament of the United Kingdom.

As of 2026, the act remains partly in force in the United Kingdom.

== Background ==
The act implemented recommendations contained in the twelfth report on statute law revision, by the Law Commission and the Scottish Law Commission.

== Provisions ==
=== Repealed enactments ===
Section 1(1) of the act repealed 375 enactments, listed in parts I to XIII of schedule 1 to the act.

==== Part I: Administration of Justice ====
Part I — Administration of Justice
Citation	Short title	Extent of repeal
Group 1 – General Repeals
11 Geo. 4 & 1 Will. 4. c. 70	Law Terms Act 1830	The whole act.
6 & 7 Will. 4. c. 114	Trials for Felony Act 1836	The whole act.
6 & 7 Vict. c. 85	Evidence Act 1843	The whole act.
8 & 9 Vict. c. 16	Companies Clauses Consolidation Act 1845	Section 143.
8 & 9 Vict. c. 17	Companies Clauses Consolidation (Scotland) Act 1845	Section 145.
8 & 9 Vict. c. 19	Lands Clauses Consolidation (Scotland) Act 1845	Section 132.
8 & 9 Vict. c. 72	Rothwell Gaol Act 1845	The whole act.
14 & 15 Vict. c. 100	Criminal Procedure Act 1851	The whole act.
17 & 18 Vict. c. 112	Literary and Scientific Institutions Act 1854	Section 22.
17 & 18 Vict. c. 112	Literary and Scientific Institutions Act 1854	In section 23, the words from "and a writ of revivor" onwards.
44 & 45 Vict. c. 24	Summary Jurisdiction (Process) Act 1881	Section 6 as it applies to the Isle of Man.
51 & 52 Vict. c. 64	Law of Libel Amendment Act 1888	Section 9 as it applies to England and Wales.
23 & 24 Geo. 5. c. 36	Administration of Justice (Miscellaneous Provisions) Act 1933	In schedule 2, paragraph 4.
24 & 25 Geo. 5. c. 45	Solicitors Act 1934	The whole act.
1965 c. 32	Administration of Estates (Small Payments) Act 1965	In section 6(1)(b), the words "section 38(2) of the Finance Act 1918".
1970 c. 17	Proceedings against Estates Act 1970	The whole act.
1971 c. 23	Courts Act 1971	In schedule 8, paragraph 6.
1971 c. 62	Tribunals and Inquiries Act 1971	In schedule 1, paragraph 2.
1983 c. 19	Matrimonial Homes Act 1983	In schedule 2, the entry relating to the Matrimonial Homes Act 1967.
1984 c. 28	County Courts Act 1984	In sections 14(1)(b), 92(1)(b) and 118(1)(i), the words "any" and "to which the judge has power to commit".
1984 c. 28	County Courts Act 1984	Section 79(2).
1984 c. 28	County Courts Act 1984	Section 141.
Group 2 – Judicial Committee
58 & 59 Vict. c. 44	Judicial Committee Amendment Act 1895	In section 1(1), the words from "of the Dominion" to "province of Canada".
8 Edw. 7. c. 51	Appellate Jurisdiction Act 1908	In section 3, the words "or chief justice or judge of the Supreme Court of Newfoundland".
8 Edw. 7. c. 51	Appellate Jurisdiction Act 1908	In the schedule, the entries relating to British India and the Dominion of Canada.
1970 c. 37	Republic of The Gambia Act 1970	Section 2(5).
1976 c. 19	Seychelles Act 1976	Section 6.
1976 c. 54	Trinidad and Tobago Republic Act 1976	Section 2(3).
1978 c. 15	Solomon Islands Act 1978	Section 8.
1979 c. 27	Kiribati Act 1979	Section 6(3).
1980 c. 16	New Hebrides Act 1980	Section 3.
Group 3 – Metropolitan Police Acts
10 Geo. 4. c. 44	Metropolitan Police Act 1829	Sections 14, 15 and 16.
2 & 3 Vict. c. 47	Metropolitan Police Act 1839	Sections 32 and 74.
2 & 3 Vict. c. 71	Metropolitan Police Courts Act 1839	Sections 39, 40 and 51. Schedule (A).
24 & 25 Vict. c. 124	Metropolitan Police (Receiver) Act 1861	Sections 2, 3 and 4.
24 & 25 Vict. c. 124	Metropolitan Police (Receiver) Act 1861	In section 5, the words from "and may purchase" onwards.
24 & 25 Vict. c. 124	Metropolitan Police (Receiver) Act 1861	Section 8.
50 & 51 Vict. c. 45	Metropolitan Police Act 1887	Section 4.
Group 4 – Scottish Courts
1555 (c. 6)	Citation Act 1555	The whole act.
1661 (c. 47)	Messengers of Arms Act 1661	The whole act.
10 Geo. 1. c. 19	Court of Session Act 1723	The whole act.
20 Geo. 2. c. 43	Heritable Jurisdictions (Scotland) Act 1746	In section 34, the words from "except all cases" to "twelve pounds sterling".
24 Geo. 2. c. 23	Calendar (New Style) Act 1750	In section 4, the words from the beginning to "Fens, and"; and from "the said Courts" to "April meeting, and".
54 Geo. 3. c. 67	Justiciary Courts (Scotland) Act 1814	The whole act.
6 Geo. 4. c. 23	Sheriff Courts (Scotland) Act 1825	The whole act.
1 & 2 Vict. c. 119	Sheriff Courts (Scotland) Act 1838	The whole act.
30 & 31 Vict. c. 17	Lyon King of Arms Act 1867	In section 11, the words from "and after the death" onwards.
39 & 40 Vict. c. 70	Sheriff Courts (Scotland) Act 1876	Part VII.
55 & 56 Vict. c. 17	Sheriff Courts (Scotland) Extracts Act 1892	In section 2, the words from "to proceedings in" to "thirteen, or".
56 & 57 Vict. c. 44	Sheriff Courts Consignations (Scotland) Act 1893	In section 2, the words "or the small debt court or debts recovery court".
56 & 57 Vict. c. 44	Sheriff Courts Consignations (Scotland) Act 1893	Section 6.
56 & 57 Vict. c. 44	Sheriff Courts Consignations (Scotland) Act 1893	In section 7, the words from the beginning to "and similarly".
56 & 57 Vict. c. 44	Sheriff Courts Consignations (Scotland) Act 1893	In section 8, the words from "shall report" to "and he".
56 & 57 Vict. c. 44	Sheriff Courts Consignations (Scotland) Act 1893	In section 9, the words from "to direct" to "Remembrancer" and the words "to them".
10 & 11 Geo. 6. c. 14	Exchange Control Act 1947	In part II of schedule 5, paragraph 4.
1965 c. 45	Backing of Warrants (Republic of Ireland) Act 1965	In section 8(2), the words from "and accordingly" onwards.
1972 c. 38	Matrimonial Proceedings (Polygamous Marriages) Act 1972	Section 2(2)(c).
1980 c. 55	Law Reform (Miscellaneous Provisions) (Scotland) Act 1980	Section 2(2)(b).
1980 c. 62	Criminal Justice (Scotland) Act 1980	In schedule 8, the entry relating to section 26(5) of the Criminal Justice Act 1961.
1983 c. 12	Divorce Jurisdiction, Court Fees and Legal Aid (Scotland) Act 1983	In schedule 1, paragraph 13.
Group 5 – Tender of Amends and Payment into Court
21 Jas. 1. c. 16	Limitation Act 1623	The whole act.
10 Chas. 1 Sess. 2. c. 6 (I)	Limitation Act (Ireland) 1634	The whole act.
11 Geo. 2. c. 19	Distress for Rent Act 1737	Section 20.
11 Geo. 4 & 1 Will. 4. c. 68	Carriers Act 1830	Section 10.
8 & 9 Vict. c. 19	Lands Clauses Consolidation (Scotland) Act 1845	Section 129.
8 & 9 Vict. c. 20	Railways Clauses Consolidation Act 1845	Section 139.
8 & 9 Vict. c. 33	Railways Clauses Consolidation (Scotland) Act 1845	Section 131.
48 & 49 Vict. c. 49	Submarine Telegraph Act 1885	Section 6(4).
53 & 54 Vict. c. 37	Foreign Jurisdiction Act 1890	Section 13(2).

==== Part II: Agriculture ====
Part II — Agriculture
Citation	Short title	Extent of repeal
52 & 53 Vict. c. 30	Board of Agriculture Act 1889	Section 2(1)(c) and the preceding "and".
52 & 53 Vict. c. 30	Board of Agriculture Act 1889	Section 9.
52 & 53 Vict. c. 30	Board of Agriculture Act 1889	Section 11(2) and (3).
52 & 53 Vict. c. 30	Board of Agriculture Act 1889	Section 13.
52 & 53 Vict. c. 30	Board of Agriculture Act 1889	In part II of schedule 1, the entries relating to the Public Schools Act 1868, the Universities of Oxford and Cambridge Act 1877 and statutes made thereunder, the Conveyancing and Law of Property Act 1881 and the Glebe Lands Act 1888.
3 Edw. 7. c. 31	Board of Agriculture and Fisheries Act 1903	In section 1(2), the words from the beginning to "enactments, and".
3 Edw. 7. c. 31	Board of Agriculture and Fisheries Act 1903	In section 1(4), the words "nine (transfer of officers) and".
3 Edw. 7. c. 31	Board of Agriculture and Fisheries Act 1903	The schedule.
1 & 2 Geo. 5. c. 49	Small Landholders (Scotland) Act 1911	In schedule 1, the entry relating to the Light Railways Act 1896.
1 Edw. 8 & 1 Geo. 6. c. 70	Agriculture Act 1937	The whole act.
2 & 3 Geo. 6. c. 48	Agricultural Development Act 1939	The whole act.
3 & 4 Geo. 6. c. 14	Agriculture (Miscellaneous War Provisions) Act 1940	Section 27.
4 & 5 Geo. 6. c. 50	Agriculture (Miscellaneous Provisions) Act 1941	Section 1.
4 & 5 Geo. 6. c. 50	Agriculture (Miscellaneous Provisions) Act 1941	Sections 12 to 14.
6 & 7 Geo. 6. c. 16	Agriculture (Miscellaneous Provisions) Act 1943	The whole act except sections 18 and 24 and schedule 3.
9 & 10 Geo. 6. c. 73	Hill Farming Act 1946	Section 12(13).
9 & 10 Geo. 6. c. 73	Hill Farming Act 1946	Sections 13 to 17.
9 & 10 Geo. 6. c. 73	Hill Farming Act 1946	Section 32(3).
9 & 10 Geo. 6. c. 73	Hill Farming Act 1946	Section 37(1)(c), (d) and (e).
9 & 10 Geo. 6. c. 73	Hill Farming Act 1946	Section 39(d).
10 & 11 Geo. 6. c. 48	Agriculture Act 1947	Section 78(8), as it applies to Scotland.
10 & 11 Geo. 6. c. 48	Agriculture Act 1947	Section 97.
12, 13 & 14 Geo. 6. c. 37	Agriculture (Miscellaneous Provisions) Act 1949	Section 12.
14 Geo. 6. c. 17	Agriculture (Miscellaneous Provisions) Act 1950	The whole act.
14 & 15 Geo. 6. c. 18	Livestock Rearing Act 1951	Section 8(b).
15 & 16 Geo. 6 & 1 Eliz. 2. c. 15	Agriculture (Fertilisers) Act 1952	The whole act.
15 & 16 Geo. 6 & 1 Eliz. 2. c. 35	Agriculture (Ploughing Grants) Act 1952	The whole act.
15 & 16 Geo. 6 & 1 Eliz. 2. c. 62	Agriculture (Calf Subsidies) Act 1952	The whole act.
2 & 3 Eliz. 2. c. 39	Agriculture (Miscellaneous Provisions) Act 1954	Section 2.
4 & 5 Eliz. 2. c. 20	Agriculture (Improvement of Roads) Act 1955	The whole act.
7 & 8 Eliz. 2. c. 12	Agriculture (Small Farmers) Act 1959	The whole act.
1963 c. 11	Agriculture (Miscellaneous Provisions) Act 1963	Sections 4, 5, 9, 10 and 12.
1967 c. 22	Agriculture Act 1967	Sections 10 to 12.
1967 c. 22	Agriculture Act 1967	Section 26(11)(b).
1967 c. 22	Agriculture Act 1967	Sections 43 and 44.
1967 c. 22	Agriculture Act 1967	Section 61(8).
1967 c. 22	Agriculture Act 1967	In section 69(1), in paragraph (a), the words "or any payment under section 12 thereof, or", and paragraphs (c), (d) and (e).
1968 c. 34	Agriculture (Miscellaneous Provisions) Act 1968	Sections 38 to 40.
1970 c. 40	Agriculture Act 1970	Section 29(6) and (7).
1970 c. 40	Agriculture Act 1970	In section 34(2), in paragraph (a), the words "section 16 of the Agriculture Act 1937 or" and paragraph (b).
1970 c. 40	Agriculture Act 1970	Sections 35 and 36.
1970 c. 40	Agriculture Act 1970	In schedule 5, part I.
1974 c. 39	Consumer Credit Act 1974	In schedule 4, paragraph 10.
1976 c. 55	Agriculture (Miscellaneous Provisions) Act 1976	In schedule 3, the entries relating to the Agriculture Act 1937 and section 40(3)(c) of the Agriculture (Miscellaneous Provisions) Act 1968.
1980 c. 66	Highways Act 1980	Section 39.
1980 c. 66	Highways Act 1980	In schedule 24, paragraph 6.

==== Part III: Finance ====
Part III — Finance
Citation	Short title	Extent of repeal
5 Geo. 1. c. 20	Revenue of Scotland Act 1718	The whole act.
41 Geo. 3 (U.K) c. 32	Irish Charges Act 1801	The whole act.
33 & 34 Vict. c. 71	National Debt Act 1870	Sections 2 and 4.
33 & 34 Vict. c. 71	National Debt Act 1870	Part IV.
33 & 34 Vict. c. 71	National Debt Act 1870	Part V.
33 & 34 Vict. c. 71	National Debt Act 1870	Section 73.
33 & 34 Vict. c. 71	National Debt Act 1870	Schedule 2.
36 & 37 Vict. c. 57	Consolidated Fund (Permanent Charges Redemption) Act 1873	In section 8, the words from "and any general rule" onwards.
47 & 48 Vict. c. 23	National Debt (Conversion of Stock) Act 1884	In section 1(2), the words from "shall not be redeemable" to "such day".
47 & 48 Vict. c. 23	National Debt (Conversion of Stock) Act 1884	In section 1(5), the words from "and the Treasury" onwards.
47 & 48 Vict. c. 23	National Debt (Conversion of Stock) Act 1884	Sections 6 and 7.
47 & 48 Vict. c. 23	National Debt (Conversion of Stock) Act 1884	In section 9, the definition of "Three per cent. stock".
51 & 52 Vict. c. 2	National Debt (Conversion) Act 1888	In section 2(2), the words from "shall not be redeemable" to "that day".
51 & 52 Vict. c. 2	National Debt (Conversion) Act 1888	In section 2(5), the words from "and the Treasury" onwards.
51 & 52 Vict. c. 2	National Debt (Conversion) Act 1888	Sections 19, 25, 27, 28 and 32.
51 & 52 Vict. c. 15	National Debt (Supplemental) Act 1888	The whole act.
52 & 53 Vict. c. 6	National Debt Act 1889	In section 4(1), the words "or by payment at a country branch".
53 & 54 Vict. c. 8	Customs and Inland Revenue Act 1890	The whole act.
55 & 56 Vict. c. 39	National Debt (Stockholders Relief) Act 1892	Section 7.
2 Edw. 7. c. 7	Finance Act 1902	Section 11.
6 Edw. 7. c. 50	National Galleries of Scotland Act 1906	Section 8.
5 & 6 Geo. 5. c. 89	Finance (No. 2) Act 1915	In section 48, the definition of "Government stock".
6 & 7 Geo. 5. c. 24	Finance Act 1916	In section 66, the definition of "Government stock".
7 & 8 Geo. 5. c. 31	Finance Act 1917	Section 35.
8 & 9 Geo. 5. c. 15	Finance Act 1918	The whole act.
8 & 9 Geo. 5. c. 24	Flax Companies (Financial Assistance) Act 1918	The whole act.
9 & 10 Geo. 5. c. 37	War Loan Act 1919	The whole act.
9 & 10 Geo. 5. c. 53	War Pensions (Administrative Provisions) Act 1919	In section 8(1), the words from the beginning to "such service; or" and from "provided that" to "Ministry Appeal Tribunal".
9 & 10 Geo. 5. c. 53	War Pensions (Administrative Provisions) Act 1919	Section 8(3).
9 & 10 Geo. 5. c. 53	War Pensions (Administrative Provisions) Act 1919	In paragraph 8 of the schedule, the words from "the transfer" to "nineteen".
11 & 12 Geo. 5. c. 49	War Pensions Act 1921	In section 2(1) in paragraph (d), the words "or the special grants committee" and "or that committee, as the case may be"; paragraph (e); and in paragraph (g), the words "or the special grants committee".
11 & 12 Geo. 5. c. 49	War Pensions Act 1921	In section 3, the words "under the War Pensions Acts, 1915 to 1920, or".
11 & 12 Geo. 5. c. 49	War Pensions Act 1921	Section 4.
11 & 12 Geo. 5. c. 49	War Pensions Act 1921	In section 6(1), the words from "or after" to "later".
15 & 16 Geo. 5. c. 29	Gold Standard Act 1925	The whole act.
18 & 19 Geo. 5. c. 17	Finance Act 1928	Section 26.
18 & 19 Geo. 5. c. 17	Finance Act 1928	Section 35(1).
21 & 22 Geo. 5. c. 46	Gold Standard (Amendment) Act 1931	The whole act.
24 & 25 Geo. 5. c. 32	Finance Act 1934	Section 24.
1 Edw. 8 & 1 Geo. 6. c. 54	Finance Act 1937	Section 29.
2 & 3 Geo. 6. c. 41	Finance Act 1939	Section 38(6).
3 & 4 Geo. 6. c. 23	National Loans (No. 2) Act 1940	The whole act.
5 & 6 Geo. 6. c. 10	Securities (Validation) Act 1942	The whole act.
5 & 6 Geo. 6. c. 21	Finance Act 1942	In part I of schedule 11: (a) the entries relating to Guaranteed 2¾% Stock, Guaranteed 3% Stock, 5% Conversion Loan 1944–64, 2½% Funding Loan 1956–61, 2¾% Funding Loan 1952–57, 3% Funding Loan 1959–69, 4% Funding Loan 1960–90, 2½% Conversion Loan 1944–49, 3% Conversion Loan 1948–53, 4% Victory Bonds, 2½% National Defence Bonds 1944–48, 3% National Defence Loan 1954–58; (b) the words "(other than National Defence Bonds and National Defence Loan of the descriptions aforesaid)".
5 & 6 Geo. 6. c. 21	Finance Act 1942	In part II of schedule 11, the entries relating to the National Debt Act 1870.
10 & 11 Geo. 6. c. 35	Finance Act 1947	Section 58.
1947 c. 15 (N.I.)	Finance Act (Northern Ireland) 1947	Section 10.
12, 13 & 14 Geo. 6. c. 2	Debts Clearing Offices Act 1948	The whole act.
12, 13 & 14 Geo. 6. c. 47	Finance Act 1949	Section 40(10) as it applies to Scotland.
12, 13 & 14 Geo. 6. c. 47	Finance Act 1949	Section 48(3).
14 Geo. 6. c. 21	Miscellaneous Financial Provisions Act 1950	The whole act.
4 & 5 Eliz. 2. c. 6	Miscellaneous Financial Provisions Act 1955	Section 5(10)(b).
8 & 9 Eliz. 2. c. 1	Mr. Speaker Morrison's Retirement Act 1959	The whole act.
8 & 9 Eliz. 2. c. 58	Charities Act 1960	In schedule 6, the entry relating to the National Debt (Conversion) Act 1888.
1963 c. 25	Finance Act 1963	Section 71(6).
1963 c. 25	Finance Act 1963	Section 73(7)(a).
1963 c. 25	Finance Act 1963	Schedule 12.
1963 c. 25	Finance Act 1963	In schedule 14, part VIII.
1964 c. 7	Shipbuilding Credit Act 1964	The whole act.
1964 c. 92	Finance (No. 2) Act 1964	The whole act.
1965 c. 25	Finance Act 1965	Schedules 1 to 4.
1967 c. 47	Decimal Currency Act 1967	The whole act.
1968 c. 11	Revenue Act 1968	The whole act.
1968 c. 13	National Loans Act 1968	In schedule 1, the entry relating to the Shipbuilding Credit Act 1964.
1968 c. 13	National Loans Act 1968	In schedule 5, the entries relating to the War Loan Act 1919 and the Finance Act 1934.
1968 c. 32	Industrial Expansion Act 1968	Section 9.
1971 c. 17	Industry Act 1971	The whole act.
1971 c. 56	Pensions (Increase) Act 1971	In schedule 2, in paragraph 3, the words "Mr. Speaker Morrison's Retirement Act 1959 or".
1972 c. 41	Finance Act 1972	Sections 53, 54 and 122.
1972 c. 41	Finance Act 1972	Schedule 27.
1972 c. 41	Finance Act 1972	In schedule 28, parts I, II, VIII and IX.
1974 c. 30	Finance Act 1974	Section 53.
1974 c. 30	Finance Act 1974	Schedule 13.
1974 c. 30	Finance Act 1974	In schedule 14, part V.
1979 c. 2	Customs and Excise Management Act 1979	In section 171(2A), as inserted by the Finance Act 1984, the words from "and for the purposes" onwards.
1979 c. 2	Customs and Excise Management Act 1979	Section 177(2).
1979 c. 2	Customs and Excise Management Act 1979	In part I of the table in schedule 4, the entries relating to the Finance (No. 2) Act 1964.
1979 c. 8	Excise Duties (Surcharges or Rebates) Act 1979	In schedule 1, paragraph 1.
1984 c. 51	Capital Transfer Tax Act 1984	Section 225(7).
Pension Funds
2 Edw. 7. c. clxxxiv	Aberdeen Accountants Order Confirmation Act 1902	The whole act.
8 Edw. 7. c. ii	Clyde Navigation (Superannuation) Order Confirmation Act 1908	The whole act.
13 & 14 Geo. 5. c. lxv	Church of Scotland Ministers' and Scottish University Professors' Widows' Fund Order Confirmation Act 1923	The whole act.
15 Geo. 5. c. ii	Edinburgh Chartered Accountants Annuity &c. Fund Order Confirmation Act 1924	The whole act.
16 & 17 Geo. 5. c. lxviii	Church of Scotland Ministers' and Scottish University Professors' Widows' Fund (Amendment) Order Confirmation Act 1926	The whole act.
17 & 18 Geo. 5. c. cxiv	Edinburgh Chartered Accountants Annuity &c. Fund Order Confirmation Act 1927	The whole act.
20 & 21 Geo. 5. c. cxxxiv	Churches & Universities (Scotland) Widows' and Orphans' Fund Order Confirmation Act 1930	The whole act.
1 Edw. 8. c. ii	Edinburgh Chartered Accountants Annuity &c. Fund (Consolidation and Amendment) Order Confirmation Act 1936	The whole act.
6 & 7 Geo. 6. c. i	Edinburgh Merchant Company Endowments (Amendment) Order Confirmation Act 1942	The whole act.
12 & 13 Geo. 6. c. vi	Clyde Navigation (Superannuation) Order Confirmation Act 1949	The whole act.
12 & 13 Geo. 6. c. xiii	Royal Bank of Scotland Officers' Widows' Fund Order Confirmation Act 1949	The whole act.
3 & 4 Eliz. 2. c. iv	Clyde Navigation (Superannuation) Order Confirmation Act 1955	The whole act.

==== Part IV: Imports and Exports ====
Part IV — Imports and Exports
Citation	Short title	Extent of repeal
39 & 40 Vict. c. 36	Customs Consolidation Act 1876	Section 43.
42 & 43 Vict. c. 21	Customs and Inland Revenue Act 1879	Section 8.
49 & 50 Vict. c. 41	Customs Amendment Act 1886	The whole act.
63 & 64 Vict. c. 44	Exportation of Arms Act 1900	The whole act.
4 & 5 Geo. 5. c. 64	Customs (Exportation Prohibition) Act 1914	The whole act.
5 & 6 Geo. 5. c. 2	Customs (Exportation Restriction) Act 1914	The whole act.
6 & 7 Geo. 5. c. 52	Trading with the Enemy and Export of Prohibited Goods Act 1916	The whole act.
11 & 12 Geo. 5. c. 32	Finance Act 1921	Section 17.
22 & 23 Geo. 5. c. 53	Ottawa Agreements Act 1932	The whole act.

==== Part V: Industrial Relations ====
Part V — Industrial Relations
Citation	Short title	Extent of repeal
5 & 6 Geo. 6. c. 9	Restoration of Pre-War Trade Practices Act 1942	The whole act.
14 & 15 Geo. 6. c. 9	Restoration of Pre-War Trade Practices Act 1950	The whole act.
1974 c. 52	Trade Union and Labour Relations Act 1974	Section 1, except in subsection (2) the words "Schedule 1 to this Act shall have effect".
1974 c. 52	Trade Union and Labour Relations Act 1974	Sections 20 to 24.
1974 c. 52	Trade Union and Labour Relations Act 1974	In schedule 4, paragraph 4.

==== Part VI: Intellectual Property ====
Part VI — Intellectual Property
Citation	Short title	Extent of repeal
15 Geo. 3. c. 52	Porcelain Patent Act 1775	The whole act.
7 Edw. 7. c. 29	Patents and Designs Act 1907	Section 82.
1 & 2 Geo. 5. c. 46	Copyright Act 1911	Section 34.
1 & 2 Geo. 5. c. 46	Copyright Act 1911	Section 37(2).
22 & 23 Geo. 5. c. 32	Patents and Designs Act 1932	The whole act.
2 & 3 Geo. 6. c. 32	Patents and Designs (Limits of Time) Act 1939	The whole act.
9 & 10 Geo. 6. c. 44	Patents and Designs Act 1946	The whole act.
12, 13 & 14 Geo. 6. c. 62	Patents and Designs Act 1949	In schedule 1, the entry relating to section 82 of the Patents and Designs Act 1907.
12, 13 & 14 Geo. 6. c. 88	Registered Designs Act 1949	In section 13(2), the words from "any British protectorate" to "United Nations".
12, 13 & 14 Geo. 6. c. 88	Registered Designs Act 1949	In section 13(3), the words "in accordance with a mandate from the League of Nations or".
4 & 5 Eliz. 2. c. 74	Copyright Act 1956	In schedule 7, paragraph 40.
1977 c. 37	Patents Act 1977	In section 90(2), the words "or any British protectorate or protected state".

==== Part VII: Local Government ====
Part VII — Local Government
Citation	Short title	Extent of repeal
Group 1 – General Repeals
34 & 35 Vict. c. 70	Local Government Board Act 1871	The whole act.
8 Edw. 7. c. 62	Local Government (Scotland) Act 1908	The whole act.
3 & 4 Geo. 5. c. clvi	Dunfermline District Water Order Confirmation Act 1913	The whole act.
3 & 4 Geo. 5. c. clx	Lanarkshire (Middle Ward District) Water Order Confirmation Act 1913	The whole act.
6 & 7 Geo. 5. c. i	Aberdeen Corporation Water Order Confirmation Act 1916	The whole act.
8 & 9 Geo. 5. c. i	Dunfermline District Water Order Confirmation Act 1918	The whole act.
12 Geo. 5. c. i	Lanarkshire County Council Order Confirmation Act 1922	The whole act.
15 & 16 Geo. 5. c. lxix	Lanarkshire County Council Order Confirmation Act 1925	The whole act.
20 Geo. 5. c. xviii	Dundee Corporation Order Confirmation Act 1929	The whole act.
24 & 25 Geo. 5. c. xlii	Dundee Corporation Order Confirmation Act 1934	The whole act.
9 & 10 Geo. 6. c. xxxviii	Manchester Corporation Act 1946	Section 35.
12 & 13 Geo. 6. c. xliii	Bolton Corporation Act 1949	Section 43.
12, 13 & 14 Geo. 6. c. 84	War Damaged Sites Act 1949	The whole act.
6 & 7 Eliz. 2. c. 64	Local Government and Miscellaneous Financial Provisions (Scotland) Act 1958	In schedule 4, paragraph 13(3).
1969 c. 48	Post Office Act 1969	In schedule 4, paragraph 49.
1972 c. 70	Local Government Act 1972	Section 101(9)(g).
1981 c. ix	Greater Manchester Act 1981	Sections 145 and 160.
Group 2 – Exemptions from Corporate or Parochial Offices
45 & 46 Vict. c. 50	Municipal Corporations Act 1882	Section 257(4).
53 & 54 Vict. c. 21	Inland Revenue Regulation Act 1890	Section 8.
1 & 2 Eliz. 2. c. 37	Registration Service Act 1953	Section 17.
Group 3 – Festival of Britain 1951
12, 13 & 14 Geo. 6. c. 26	Public Works (Festival of Britain) Act 1949	The whole act.
12, 13 & 14 Geo. 6. c. 102	Festival of Britain (Supplementary Provisions) Act 1949	The whole act.
15 & 16 Geo. 6 & 1 Eliz. 2. c. 13	Festival Pleasure Gardens Act 1952	The whole act.
1981 c. 67	Acquisition of Land Act 1981	In schedule 4: (a) in the table in paragraph 1, the entry relating to the Public Works (Festival of Britain) Act 1949; (b) paragraph 5.
Group 4 – Rating
17 & 18 Vict. c. 91	Lands Valuation (Scotland) Act 1854	In section 20, the words from "and the remuneration" onwards.
17 & 18 Vict. c. 91	Lands Valuation (Scotland) Act 1854	Sections 28 and 29.
30 & 31 Vict. c. 80	Valuation of Lands (Scotland) Amendment Act 1867	In section 6, the words from the beginning to "therein, and".
30 & 31 Vict. c. 80	Valuation of Lands (Scotland) Amendment Act 1867	Section 8.
19 & 20 Geo. 5. c. 25	Local Government (Scotland) Act 1929	Sections 20, 47, 48 and 77(1).
24 & 25 Geo. 5. c. 22	Assessor of Public Undertakings (Scotland) Act 1934	Sections 2 and 3.
1 & 2 Geo. 6. c. 52	Coal Act 1938	In section 45(16), the words "or Supplementary Valuation Roll".
12, 13 & 14 Geo. 6. c. 75	Agricultural Holdings (Scotland) Act 1949	In section 7(2)(b), the words from "the relief" to "that Act nor".
10 & 11 Eliz. 2. c. 9	Local Government (Financial Provisions etc.) (Scotland) Act 1962	Section 5.
1966 c. 9	Rating Act 1966	The whole act.
1972 c. 11	Superannuation Act 1972	In schedule 6, paragraphs 13 and 14.
1972 c. 60	Gas Act 1972	Section 34(3).
1973 c. 65	Local Government (Scotland) Act 1973	Section 117.
1975 c. 30	Local Government (Scotland) Act 1975	Section 2(4).
1975 c. 30	Local Government (Scotland) Act 1975	Section 5(1)(c).
1975 c. 30	Local Government (Scotland) Act 1975	In section 5(4), the words "or (c)(i)", "or (c)(ii)" and "or (c)(iii)".
1976 c. 45	Rating (Charity Shops) Act 1976	Section 1(3).
1984 c. 31	Rating and Valuation (Amendment) (Scotland) Act 1984	In section 13(1), the words from the beginning to "1867 and".
1984 c. 31	Rating and Valuation (Amendment) (Scotland) Act 1984	Section 13(2) and (4).
1984 c. 31	Rating and Valuation (Amendment) (Scotland) Act 1984	Section 21(2).
1984 c. 31	Rating and Valuation (Amendment) (Scotland) Act 1984	Schedule 3.

==== Part VIII: Medicine and Health Services ====
Part VIII — Medicine and Health Services
Citation	Short title	Description	Extent of repeal
32 Hen. 8. c. 42	Barbers and Surgeons Act 1540	Concerning Barbers and Chirurgians.	The whole act.
18 Geo. 2. c. 15	Surgeons Act 1745	An Act for making the Surgeons of London and the Barbers of London two separate and distinct corporations.	The whole act except sections 12 and 15 to 18.
21 & 22 Vict. c. 90	Medical Act 1858	The Medical Act, 1858.	Sections 48 to 51.
23 & 24 Vict. c. 66	Medical Act 1860	The Medical Act, 1860.	In section 2, the words from "and any such new charter", where first occurring, onwards.
38 & 39 Vict. c. 43	Medical Act (Royal College of Surgeons of England) 1875	The Medical Act (Royal College of Surgeons of England), 1875.	The whole act.
41 & 42 Vict. c. 33	Dentists Act 1878	The Dentists Act, 1878.	The whole act.
49 & 50 Vict. c. 48	Medical Act 1886	The Medical Act, 1886.	The whole act.
26 Geo. 5 & 1 Edw. 8. c. 40	Midwives Act 1936	The Midwives Act, 1936.	The whole act.
2 & 3 Geo. 6. c. 13	Cancer Act 1939	The Cancer Act, 1939.	Section 4(4)(a)(ii).
2 & 3 Geo. 6. c. 13	Cancer Act 1939	The Cancer Act, 1939.	In section 5(1), the definition of "The National Radium Trust".
2 & 3 Geo. 6. c. 13	Cancer Act 1939	The Cancer Act, 1939.	In section 7(b), the words "except in section 3 of this Act".
1968 c. 46	Health Services and Public Health Act 1968	The Health Services and Public Health Act, 1968.	In section 60(2), the words from "but the reception" onwards.
1968 c. 46	Health Services and Public Health Act 1968	The Health Services and Public Health Act, 1968.	In schedule 3, the entries relating to the Disabled Persons (Employment) Act 1958 and the Mental Health Act 1959.
1977 c. 49	National Health Service Act 1977	The National Health Service Act, 1977.	In schedule 15, paragraph 1.
1978 c. 29	National Health Service (Scotland) Act 1978	The National Health Service (Scotland) Act, 1978.	In schedule 16, paragraph 19.
1980 c. 15	National Health Service (Invalid Direction) Act 1980	The National Health Service (Invalid Direction) Act, 1980.	The whole act.

==== Part IX: Overseas Jurisdiction ====
Part IX — Overseas Jurisdiction
Citation	Short title	Extent of repeal
41 Geo. 3. c. 103	Malta Act 1801	The whole act.
23 & 24 Vict. c. 5	Indian Securities Act 1860	The whole act.
36 & 37 Vict. c. 59	Slave Trade (East African Courts) Act 1873	The whole act.
36 & 37 Vict. c. 88	Slave Trade Act 1873	In section 2, in the definition of "British slave court", the words from "and every East African Court" onwards.
38 & 39 Vict. c. 51	Pacific Islanders Protection Act 1875	The whole act.
42 & 43 Vict. c. 38	Slave Trade (East African Courts) Act 1879	The whole act.
50 & 51 Vict. c. 54	British Settlements Act 1887	Section 7.
53 & 54 Vict. c. 27	Colonial Courts of Admiralty Act 1890	In section 9(2)(a), the words "in India or" and "other" and from "or the Pacific" to "1875".
53 & 54 Vict. c. 27	Colonial Courts of Admiralty Act 1890	In section 13(1), the words from "and in and from East African Courts" onwards.
53 & 54 Vict. c. 27	Colonial Courts of Admiralty Act 1890	Section 13(3).
53 & 54 Vict. c. 27	Colonial Courts of Admiralty Act 1890	Sections 16, 17 and 18.
53 & 54 Vict. c. 27	Colonial Courts of Admiralty Act 1890	Schedules 1 and 2.
53 & 54 Vict. c. 37	Foreign Jurisdiction Act 1890	Section 18.
6 & 7 Geo. 5. c. 9	Pacific Islands Regulations (Validation) Act 1916	The whole act.
10 & 11 Geo. 5. c. 27	Nauru Island Agreement Act 1920	The whole act.
4 & 5 Eliz. 2. c. 23	Leeward Islands Act 1956	The whole act.
4 & 5 Eliz. 2. c. 63	British Caribbean Federation Act 1956	The whole act.
1967 c. 4	West Indies Act 1967	The whole act except sections 6, 8, 17(1) and (4), 19 and 21.

==== Part X: Parliamentary and Constitutional Provisions ====
Part X — Parliamentary and Constitutional Provisions
Citation	Short title	Extent of repeal
34 & 35 Vict. c. 3	Parliamentary Costs Act 1871	In section 4, the words "provisional certificates".
42 & 43 Vict. c. 17	House of Commons Costs Taxation Act 1879	In section 1, the words "or provisional certificate".
42 & 43 Vict. c. 17	House of Commons Costs Taxation Act 1879	In section 2, the words "or by the Local Government Board", "or provisional certificate" and "or to the Local Government Board, as the case may be".
11 & 12 Geo. 6. c. 36	House of Commons Members' Fund Act 1948	Section 6.
11 & 12 Geo. 6. c. 65	Representation of the People Act 1948	The whole act except sections 1(1) and 81.
12, 13 & 14 Geo. 6. c. 66	House of Commons (Redistribution of Seats) Act 1949	Section 5.
12, 13 & 14 Geo. 6. c. 66	House of Commons (Redistribution of Seats) Act 1949	In section 6, the words from "for any reference" (where first occurring) to "burgh, and" and from "whether" to "other Act".
12, 13 & 14 Geo. 6. c. 66	House of Commons (Redistribution of Seats) Act 1949	Sections 8 and 9(2).
12, 13 & 14 Geo. 6. c. 103	Parliament Act 1949	In section 1, the proviso.
1975 c. 33	Referendum Act 1975	The whole act.

==== Part XI: Shipping, Harbours and Fisheries ====
Part XI — Shipping, Harbours and Fisheries
Citation	Short title	Extent of repeal
14 & 15 Vict. c. 26	Herring Fishery Act 1851	The whole act.
16 & 17 Vict. c. 107	Customs Consolidation Act 1853	The whole act.
16 & 17 Vict. c. 129	Pilotage Law Amendment Act 1853	The whole act.
27 & 28 Vict. c. 58	Hartlepool Pilotage Order Confirmation Act 1864	The whole act.
28 & 29 Vict. c. 100	Harbours Transfer Act 1865	The whole act.
57 & 58 Vict. c. 60	Merchant Shipping Act 1894	Section 683(4).
9 Edw. 7. c. 8	Trawling in Prohibited Areas Prevention Act 1909	The whole act.
1 & 2 Geo. 5. c. 42	Merchant Shipping Act 1911	The whole act.
2 & 3 Geo. 5. c. 31	Pilotage Act 1913	The whole act as it applies to the Isle of Man.
26 Geo. 5 & 1 Edw. 8. c. 36	Pilotage Authorities (Limitation of Liability) Act 1936	The whole act as it applies to the Isle of Man.
3 & 4 Geo. 6. c. xlii	Clyde Lighthouses Consolidation Order Confirmation Act 1940	The whole act.
3 & 4 Eliz. 2. c. 7	Fisheries Act 1955	Section 3 as it applies to England and Wales.
6 Eliz. 2. c. v	Clyde Lighthouses Order Confirmation Act 1957	The whole act.
8 & 9 Eliz. 2. c. 42	Merchant Shipping (Mini-coy Lighthouse) Act 1960	The whole act.
1973 c. 27	Bahamas Independence Act 1973	Section 5.
1974 c. 43	Merchant Shipping Act 1974	Section 24(4).
1981 c. 29	Fisheries Act 1981	In schedule 4, paragraphs 9 and 29.
Harbour Order Confirmation Acts
9 & 10 Geo. 5. c. ii	Leith Harbour and Docks Order Confirmation Act 1919	The whole act.
9 & 10 Geo. 5. c. xcviii	Clyde Navigation Order Confirmation Act 1919	The whole act.
9 & 10 Geo. 5. c. civ	Granton Harbour Order Confirmation Act 1919	The whole act.
11 & 12 Geo. 5. c. v	Forth Conservancy Order Confirmation Act 1921	The whole act.
15 & 16 Geo. 5. c. cxxv	Leith Harbour and Docks Order Confirmation Act 1925	The whole act.
23 & 24 Geo. 5. c. li	Leith Harbour and Docks Order Confirmation Act 1933	The whole act.
25 & 26 Geo. 5. c. liv	Leith Harbour and Docks Consolidation Order Confirmation Act 1935	The whole act.
4 & 5 Geo. 6. c. vii	Greenock Port and Harbours Order Confirmation Act 1941	The whole act.
9 & 10 Geo. 6. c. lix	Aberdeen Harbour Order Confirmation Act 1946	The whole act.
12 & 13 Geo. 6. c. liv	Aberdeen Harbour Order Confirmation Act 1949	The whole act.
14 Geo. 6. c. xxv	Leith Harbour and Docks Order Confirmation Act 1950	The whole act.
14 Geo. 6. c. xxviii	Granton Harbour Order Confirmation Act 1950	The whole act.
14 Geo. 6. c. xxix	Greenock Port and Harbours Order Confirmation Act 1950	The whole act.
15 & 16 Geo. 6 & 1 Eliz. 2. c. xviii	Leith Harbour and Docks Order Confirmation Act 1952	The whole act.
1 & 2 Eliz. 2. c. xix	Clyde Navigation Order Confirmation Act 1953	The whole act.
5 Eliz. 2. c. i	Clyde Navigation Order Confirmation Act 1956	The whole act.
7 & 8 Eliz. 2. c. xxxv	Leith Harbour and Docks Order Confirmation Act 1959	The whole act.
8 Eliz. 2. c. ii	Clyde Navigation Order Confirmation Act 1959	The whole act.
10 & 11 Eliz. 2. c. xxxiv	Leith Harbour and Docks Order Confirmation Act 1962	The whole act.

==== Part XII: Subordinate Legislation Procedure ====
Part XII — Subordinate Legislation Procedure
Citation	Short title	Extent of repeal
7 & 8 Vict. c. 69	Judicial Committee Act 1844	In section 1, the words "Provided also, that every such general order in council as aforesaid shall be published in the London Gazette within one calendar month next after the making thereof;".
18 & 19 Vict. c. 68	Burial Grounds (Scotland) Act 1855	In section 5, the words from "and such Order in Council" to "this Act".
20 & 21 Vict. c. 81	Burial Act 1857	In sections 10 and 23, the words "and every such Order in Council shall be published in the London Gazette;".
27 & 28 Vict. c. 24	Naval Agency and Distribution Act 1864	In section 26, the words from "shall be published" to "Gazette, and" and from "within" (where first occurring) onwards.
27 & 28 Vict. c. 25	Naval Prize Act 1864	In section 54, the words from "shall be published" to "Gazette, and" and from "within" (where first occurring) onwards.
28 & 29 Vict. c. 89	Greenwich Hospital Act 1865	In section 60, the words from "shall be published" to "Gazette, and" and from "within" (where first occurring) onwards.
28 & 29 Vict. c. 111	Navy and Marines (Property of Deceased) Act 1865	In section 18, the words from "shall be published" to "Gazette, and" and from "within" (where first occurring) onwards.
28 & 29 Vict. c. 125	Dockyard Ports Regulation Act 1865	In section 7, the words from "and such rules" onwards.
28 & 29 Vict. c. 125	Dockyard Ports Regulation Act 1865	Sections 8, 9 and 10.
28 & 29 Vict. c. 125	Dockyard Ports Regulation Act 1865	In section 26, the words from "within" (where first occurring) onwards.
31 & 32 Vict. c. 101	Titles to Land Consolidation (Scotland) Act 1868	In the proviso to section 162, the words from "within" to "same may" and from "and until" onwards.
33 & 34 Vict. c. 78	Tramways Act 1870	In section 64, the words from "Any rules" (where first occurring) to "judicially noticed" and from "within three weeks" (where first occurring) onwards.
36 & 37 Vict. c. 88	Slave Trade Act 1873	In section 29, the words from "within six weeks" (where first occurring) to "Gazette".
38 & 39 Vict. c. 17	Explosives Act 1875	In section 83, as it applies to Great Britain, the words from "Every Order" (where first occurring) to "whatever"; from "shall take effect" to "Gazette, and"; and from "within" (where first occurring) to "session of Parliament".
38 & 39 Vict. c. 18	Seal Fishery Act 1875	In section 1, the words from "within six weeks" (where first occurring) onwards.
38 & 39 Vict. c. 89	Public Works Loans Act 1875	In section 41, the words "as if it was enacted in this Act" and from "as soon as" to "powers of this Act".
39 & 40 Vict. c. 18	Treasury Solicitor Act 1876	In section 5, the words from "within" (where first occurring) onwards.
40 & 41 Vict. c. 2	Treasury Bills Act 1877	In section 9, the words from "within one month" (where first occurring) to "enacted in this Act".
40 & 41 Vict. c. 41	Crown Office Act 1877	In section 3, provisos (1) and (2); and the words from "within one month" (where first occurring) onwards.
40 & 41 Vict. c. 41	Crown Office Act 1877	In section 5, the words from "within one month" (where first occurring) onwards.
42 & 43 Vict. c. 58	Public Offices Fees Act 1879	In section 2, the words from "Every such order" onwards.
42 & 43 Vict. c. 58	Public Offices Fees Act 1879	In section 3, the words from "and shall be binding" to "this Act".
47 & 48 Vict. c. 31	Colonial Prisoners Removal Act 1884	Section 4(4) from "duly observed" onwards, except the words "laid before Parliament".
47 & 48 Vict. c. 31	Colonial Prisoners Removal Act 1884	In section 13(1), the words from "and every Order" onwards.
47 & 48 Vict. c. 31	Colonial Prisoners Removal Act 1884	In section 13(2), the words from "as soon as" (where first occurring) onwards.
47 & 48 Vict. c. 55	Pensions and Yeomanry Pay Act 1884	In section 2(2), the words "as if enacted in this Act".
49 & 50 Vict. c. 53	Sea Fishing Boats (Scotland) Act 1886	In section 14, the words from "and every such Order" onwards.
50 & 51 Vict. c. 53	Escheat (Procedure) Act 1887	In section 2(7), the words from "within" (where first occurring) onwards.
51 & 52 Vict. c. 25	Railway and Canal Traffic Act 1888	In section 40(4), the words from "Any regulations" to "this Act".
52 & 53 Vict. c. 53	Paymaster General Act 1889	In section 1(2), the words from "within" (where first occurring) onwards.
53 & 54 Vict. c. 27	Colonial Courts of Admiralty Act 1890	In section 7(1), in the proviso, the words "shall have full effect as if enacted in this Act, and".
53 & 54 Vict. c. 27	Colonial Courts of Admiralty Act 1890	In section 14, the words from "and every such Order" onwards.
53 & 54 Vict. c. 37	Foreign Jurisdiction Act 1890	In section 11, the words from "forthwith" (where first occurring) onwards.
55 & 56 Vict. c. 6	Colonial Probates Act 1892	In section 4(1), the words from "as soon as" onwards.
55 & 56 Vict. c. 23	Foreign Marriage Act 1892	In section 21(2), the words from "published" to "Stationery Office and" and from "and deemed" onwards.
57 & 58 Vict. c. 2	Behring Sea Award Act 1894	In section 3(1), the words "this Act and" and from "and published" onwards.
57 & 58 Vict. c. 28	Notice of Accidents Act 1894	In section 2(5), the words "in the London Gazette and" and "other".
57 & 58 Vict. c. 28	Notice of Accidents Act 1894	In sections 7 and 8, the words from "Every order" onwards.
57 & 58 Vict. c. 60	Merchant Shipping Act 1894	In section 369(2), the words "published in the London Gazette" and "by an order published in like manner".
57 & 58 Vict. c. 60	Merchant Shipping Act 1894	Section 417(3).
57 & 58 Vict. c. 60	Merchant Shipping Act 1894	Section 479(2).
57 & 58 Vict. c. 60	Merchant Shipping Act 1894	In section 489, the words from "and those rules" onwards.
57 & 58 Vict. c. 60	Merchant Shipping Act 1894	In section 738(2), the words from "shall be published" to "Gazette, and" and from "within" (where first occurring) onwards.
57 & 58 Vict. c. 60	Merchant Shipping Act 1894	Section 738(3). Section 740.
58 & 59 Vict. c. 21	Seal Fisheries (North Pacific) Act 1895	In section 6(1), the words "and published in the London Gazette".
59 & 60 Vict. c. 35	Judicial Trustees Act 1896	In section 4(2), the words from "have the same force" to "provided that".
59 & 60 Vict. c. 48	Light Railways Act 1896	In section 10, the words from "shall have effect" to "Parliament, and".
2 Edw. 7. c. 41	Metropolis Water Act 1902	In section 18(2)(b), the words from "and shall have effect" to "this Act".
3 Edw. 7. c. 30	Railways (Electrical Power) Act 1903	Section 1(2).
8 Edw. 7. c. 36	Small Holdings and Allotments Act 1908	In section 39(3), the words "and have effect as if enacted in this Act".
1 & 2 Geo. 5. c. 28	Official Secrets Act 1911	In section 11, the words from "and the Order" to "in this Act".
3 & 4 Geo. 5. c. 17	Fabrics (Misdescription) Act 1913	In section 2, the words from "as soon as" onwards.
4 & 5 Geo. 5. c. 48	Feudal Casualties (Scotland) Act 1914	In section 23, the words from "and such act of sederunt" onwards.
5 & 6 Geo. 5. c. 48	Fishery Harbours Act 1915	In section 2(3)(i), the words "and have effect as an Act of Parliament".
5 & 6 Geo. 5. c. 48	Fishery Harbours Act 1915	In section 2(3)(ii), the words "as if enacted in this Act".
9 & 10 Geo. 5. c. 51	Checkweighing in Various Industries Act 1919	In section 5(1), the words "and eighty-six".
9 & 10 Geo. 5. c. 51	Checkweighing in Various Industries Act 1919	In schedule 3, section 86 of the Factory and Workshop Act 1901.
10 & 11 Geo. 5. c. 55	Emergency Powers Act 1920	In section 2(4), the words "shall have effect as if enacted in this Act, but".
11 & 12 Geo. 5. c. 49	War Pensions Act 1921	In section 1(7), the words from "shall" to "Act, and".
11 & 12 Geo. 5. c. 49	War Pensions Act 1921	In section 9, the words "as if enacted in this Act".
13 & 14 Geo. 5. c. 8	Industrial Assurance Act 1923	In section 43, the words from "If the Session" to the end of the section.
15 & 16 Geo. 5. c. 21	Land Registration Act 1925	In section 126(5), the words from "All such regulations" to "this Act".
15 & 16 Geo. 5. c. 21	Land Registration Act 1925	In section 137(2), the words from "and any order" to "enacted in this Act".
16 & 17 Geo. 5. c. 59	Coroners (Amendment) Act 1926	Section 12(6).
1 & 2 Geo. 6. c. 22	Trade Marks Act 1938	Section 40(2).
1 & 2 Geo. 6. c. 22	Trade Marks Act 1938	In section 40(4), the words from "if Parliament" onwards.
2 & 3 Geo. 6. c. 69	Import, Export and Customs Powers (Defence) Act 1939	In section 2(3), the words from "as soon" onwards.
9 & 10 Geo. 6. c. 17	Police (Overseas Service) Act 1945	In section 1(5), the words from "In reckoning" onwards.
9 & 10 Geo. 6. c. 17	Police (Overseas Service) Act 1945	Section 1(6).
9 & 10 Geo. 6. c. 36	Statutory Instruments Act 1946	Section 9(2).
9 & 10 Geo. 6. c. 58	Borrowing (Control and Guarantees) Act 1946	Section 3(2) and (3).
9 & 10 Geo. 6. c. 59	Coal Industry Nationalisation Act 1946	In section 62(2), the words from "In reckoning" onwards.
9 & 10 Geo. 6. c. 59	Coal Industry Nationalisation Act 1946	Section 62(3).
10 & 11 Geo. 6. c. 14	Exchange Control Act 1947	Section 36(3) and (4).
10 & 11 Geo. 6. c. 54	Electricity Act 1947	Section 64(4) and (5).

==== Part XIII: Miscellaneous ====
Part XIII — Miscellaneous
Citation	Short title	Extent of repeal
17 Geo. 3. c. 11	Worsted Act 1776	The whole act.
33 & 34 Vict. c. 69	Statute Law Revision Act 1870	The whole act.
54 & 55 Vict. c. 40	Brine Pumping (Compensation for Subsidence) Act 1891	In section 28, the words from "in accordance" to "1879".
59 & 60 Vict. c. 48	Light Railways Act 1896	Section 5.
11 & 12 Geo. 5. c. 55	Railways Act 1921	Section 70.
15 & 16 Geo. 5. c. 24	Universities and College Estates Act 1925	In section 33(2), the words "the Augmentation of Benefices Act 1831 or", "by section 16 of the said Act of 1831 or" and the proviso.
23 & 24 Geo. 5. c. 12	Children and Young Persons Act 1933	In section 107(1), the definition of "Metropolitan police court area".
26 Geo. 5 & 1 Edw. 8. c. 44	Air Navigation Act 1936	The whole act.
1 Edw. 8 & 1 Geo. 6. c. 40	Public Health (Drainage of Trade Premises) Act 1937	In section 14(1), the definition of "joint sewerage authority".
1 Edw. 8 & 1 Geo. 6. c. 48	Methylated Spirits (Sale by Retail) (Scotland) Act 1937	In section 2(1), the words from "(subject" to "licence)".
1 Edw. 8 & 1 Geo. 6. c. 48	Methylated Spirits (Sale by Retail) (Scotland) Act 1937	Section 3.
1 & 2 Geo. 6. c. 69	Young Persons (Employment) Act 1938	In section 7(1)(i), the words from "or of a licence" to "1952".
1 & 2 Geo. 6. c. 69	Young Persons (Employment) Act 1938	In section 7(3)(a), the words from "(except" to "section)".
2 & 3 Geo. 6. c. 31	Civil Defence Act 1939	In section 83(3), the words from "or in the case of grants" to "Minister of Health".
9 & 10 Geo. 6. c. 17	Police (Overseas Service) Act 1945	Section 2(3).
9 & 10 Geo. 6. c. 17	Police (Overseas Service) Act 1945	In section 3(1), in the definition of "Home police force", the words from "and in relation" to "constable".
9 & 10 Geo. 6. c. 42	Water Act 1945	Section 41(9).
9 & 10 Geo. 6. c. 42	Water Act 1945	In section 59(1), the definitions of "clerk" and "county district".
9 & 10 Geo. 6. c. 43	Requisitioned Land and War Works Act 1945	Section 53(3).
9 & 10 Geo. 6. c. 59	Coal Industry Nationalisation Act 1946	Section 50.
9 & 10 Geo. 6. c. 59	Coal Industry Nationalisation Act 1946	In section 64(2), the words from "and for any reference" onwards.
10 & 11 Geo. 6. c. 41	Fire Services Act 1947	In section 36(10), in the proviso, the words from "of any Defence Regulation" to "that Act".
11 & 12 Geo. 6. c. 52	Veterinary Surgeons Act 1948	The whole act.
12, 13 & 14 Geo. 6. c. 5	Civil Defence Act 1948	Section 3(4).
12, 13 & 14 Geo. 6. c. 5	Civil Defence Act 1948	In section 6(1), the words from the beginning to "Air Raid Precautions Act 1937".
12, 13 & 14 Geo. 6. c. 5	Civil Defence Act 1948	Section 6(3).
3 & 4 Eliz. 2. c. 27	Public Libraries (Scotland) Act 1955	Section 1.
6 & 7 Eliz. 2. c. 67	Water Act 1958	The whole act.
9 & 10 Eliz. 2. c. 34	Factories Act 1961	In schedule 6, paragraph 3.
10 & 11 Eliz. 2. c. 58	Pipe-lines Act 1962	In section 67(5), the proviso.
1963 c. 37	Children and Young Persons Act 1963	In schedule 3, paragraph 24.
1963 c. 38	Water Resources Act 1963	Section 93(3) as it applies to Scotland.
1963 c. 38	Water Resources Act 1963	Section 134(6)(a) and (b).
1963 c. 38	Water Resources Act 1963	In section 137(2)(a), the reference to section 93(3).
1965 c. 33	Control of Office and Industrial Development Act 1965	The whole act.
1967 c. 86	Countryside (Scotland) Act 1967	In section 60(7), paragraphs (e) and (f).
1968 c. 65	Gaming Act 1968	Section 6(2)(b) and (c). Section 6(3)(b) and the preceding "or".
1968 c. 65	Gaming Act 1968	In section 6(6): (a) paragraph (b) and the preceding "or"; (b) the words "or to the Secretary of State, as the case may be".
1968 c. 65	Gaming Act 1968	Section 7(3) and (4).
1968 c. 65	Gaming Act 1968	In section 8(7), the words "or subsection (3)".
1968 c. 65	Gaming Act 1968	In schedule 9: (a) in paragraph 5(1)(a), the words "or (as the case may be) by the Secretary of State"; (b) in paragraphs 20(1)(a) and 20(2), the words "(not being the Secretary of State)".
1970 c. 32	Riding Establishments Act 1970	In section 4, the proviso.
1971 c. 40	Fire Precautions Act 1971	Section 27(2).
1971 c. 65	Licensing (Abolition of State Management) Act 1971	The whole act.
1971 c. 77	Immigration Act 1971	Section 35(3), (4) and (5).
1972 c. 52	Town and Country Planning (Scotland) Act 1972	Section 120(2).
1972 c. 52	Town and Country Planning (Scotland) Act 1972	In section 275(1), the proviso to the definition of "authority possessing compulsory purchase powers".
1974 c. 37	Health and Safety at Work etc. Act 1974	Section 60(3).
1976 c. 44	Drought Act 1976	Section 5(7).
1976 c. 44	Drought Act 1976	Schedule 3.
1982 c. 13	Fire Service College Board (Abolition) Act 1982	The whole act.
1982 c. 25	Iron and Steel Act 1982	In schedule 6, paragraph 3.
1982 c. 51	Mental Health (Amendment) Act 1982	In section 70(2), the words from the beginning to "Northern Ireland and".
1983 c. 2	Representation of the People Act 1983	In schedule 8, paragraph 27.
1983 c. 20	Mental Health Act 1983	In schedule 4, paragraph 61(a).
Church Assembly Measure
6 & 7 Geo. 6. No. 3	Diocesan Education Committees Measure 1943	The whole measure.

== Subsequent developments ==
Paragraph 2 of schedule 2 to the act was repealed by section 106(2) of, and schedule 5 to, the Trade Marks Act 1994, which came into force on 31 October 1994.

Paragraph 4(1) of schedule 2 to the act was repealed by section 8(1) of, and schedule 4 to, the Parliamentary Constituencies Act 1986, which came into force on 7 February 1987.

== See also ==
- Statute Law (Repeals) Act

== Bibliography ==
- Halsbury's Statutes. Fourth Edition. 2008 Reissue. Volume 41. Page 862.
- Peter Allsop (Editor in chief). Current Law Statutes Annotated 1986. Sweet & Maxwell, Stevens & sons. London. W Green & son. Edinburgh. 1987. Volume 1.
- The Public General Acts and General Synod Measures 1986. HMSO. London. 1987. Part I. Page 195.
- HL Deb vol 468, col 978, vol 469, cols 111 to 114, vol 471, col 728, HC Deb vol 96, col 136.
