= Metropolitan Police Act 1829 =

Act of the Parliament of the United Kingdom

Metropolitan Police Act 1829 (Note: The citation of this act by this short title was authorised by section 1 of, and the first schedule to, the Short Titles Act 1896 (59 & 60 Vict. c. 14). Due to the repeal of those provisions it is now authorised by section 19(2) of the Interpretation Act 1978 (c. 30).)
- Act of Parliament
- Parliament of the United Kingdom
- Long title: An Act for improving the Police in and near the Metropolis.
- Citation: 10 Geo. 4. c. 44
- Introduced by: Robert Peel MP (Commons)
- Territorial extent: United Kingdom

Dates
- Royal assent: 19 June 1829
- Commencement: 19 June 1829 (Note: The Acts of Parliament (Commencement) Act 1793.)
Other legislation
Amended by	Metropolitan Police Act 1833; Metropolitan Police Act 1856; Metropolitan Police (Receiver) Act 1861; Statute Law Revision Act 1873; Statute Law Revision Act 1874; Statute Law Revision Act 1878; Statute Law Revision (No. 2) Act 1888; Statute Law Revision Act 1890; Police Act 1890; Metropolitan Police Act 1912; Metropolitan Police Act 1918; Metropolitan Police (Staff Superannuation and Police Fund) Act 1931; Police Act 1946; Police Pensions Act 1948; Local Government Act 1948; Representation of the People Act 1948; Justices of the Peace Act 1949; Magistrates' Courts Act 1952; House of Commons Disqualification Act 1957; Police Act 1964; Statute Law Revision Act 1966; Justices of the Peace Act 1968; Statute Law (Repeals) Act 1971; Administration of Justice Act 1973; Statute Law (Repeals) Act 1986; Greater London Authority Act 1999
Relates to	Statute of Winchester; Metropolitan Police Act 1839

Status: Amended

Text of statute as originally enacted

Revised text of statute as amended

Text of the Metropolitan Police Act 1829 as in force today (including any amendments) within the United Kingdom, from legislation.gov.uk.

The Metropolitan Police Act 1829 (10 Geo. 4. c. 44) is an act of the Parliament of the United Kingdom, introduced by Sir Robert Peel, which established the Metropolitan Police. This was to be responsible for policing the newly created Metropolitan Police District, which consisted of the City of Westminster and parts of Middlesex, Surrey, and Kent, within seven miles of Charing Cross, apart from the City of London. It replaced a previously more diverse system of parish constables and watchmen. It is one of the Metropolitan Police Acts 1829 to 1895. (Note: The Short Titles Act 1896, section 2(1) and Schedule 2)

== Provisions ==
The act was the enabling legislation for what is often considered to be the first modern police force, the "bobbies" or "peelers" (after Peel), which later served as the model for modern urban policing throughout Britain. Until the passage of the act, the Statute of Winchester of 1285 (13 Edw. 1. St. 2) was cited as the primary legislation regulating the policing of the country since the Norman Conquest.

== Subsequent developments ==
In section 1 of the act, the words "and of all liberties therein" in both places, the words "and the liberties therein" and the words "and for all liberties therein" were repealed by section 8(2) of, and part I of schedule 5 to, the Justices of the Peace Act 1968, which came into force on 25 October 1968.

Sections 6, 7 and 35 of the act were repealed by section 1 of, and the part IX of the schedule to, the Statute Law (Repeals) Act 1971, which came into force on 27 July 1971.

Section 14–16 of the act were repealed by section 1(1) of, and group 3 of part I of schedule 1 to, the Statute Law (Repeals) Act 1986, which came into force on 2 May 1986.

== See also ==
- History of law enforcement in the United Kingdom
- History of the Metropolitan Police
- Peelian principles
