= Evidence by Commission Act 1885 =

Act of the Parliament of the United Kingdom

Evidence by Commission Act 1885 (Note: Section 1.)
- Act of Parliament
- Parliament of the United Kingdom
- Long title: An Act to amend the Law relating to taking Evidence by Commission in India and the Colonies, and elsewhere in Her Majesty's Dominions.
- Citation: 48 & 49 Vict. c. 74
- Territorial extent: United Kingdom

Dates
- Royal assent: 14 August 1885
- Commencement: 14 August 1885 (Note: The Acts of Parliament (Commencement) Act 1793.)
- Repealed: 4 May 1976 (Note: The Evidence (Proceedings in Other Jurisdictions) Act 1975 (Commencement) Order 1976 (SI 1976/429).)
Other legislation
Repealed by	Evidence (Proceedings in other Jurisdictions) Act 1975

Status: Repealed

Text of statute as originally enacted

The Evidence by Commission Act 1885 (48 & 49 Vict. c. 74) was an act of the Parliament of the United Kingdom. It became law on 14 August 1885. It was one of the Evidence Acts 1806 to 1895.

It provided that when a court issued a commission for the examination of a witness outside its jurisdiction, the judge or court it was addressed to could appoint a fit person (in a civil case) or, in a criminal case, a judge or magistrate of that court or an inferior court, to take the examination of the witness. The Evidence by Commission Act 1859 (22 Vict. c. 20) was amended to apply to proceedings under this act, granting the power to make rules for the remuneration of the examiner and any costs incurred. It also stipulated that the witness could be examined under oath, affirmation, or by any other appropriate means provided by the law of the place where they were examined.

It applied throughout India and the Colonies, and elsewhere in the Dominions; in effect, throughout the British Empire.

== Subsequent developments ==
The whole act was repealed by section 8(2) of, and schedule 2 to, Evidence (Proceedings in other Jurisdictions) Act 1975, which came into force on 4 May 1976.

== Bibliography ==
- Oliver & Boyd's new Edinburgh almanac and national repository for the year 1886. Oliver & Boyd, Edinburgh, 1886
