= Foreign Jurisdiction Act 1890 =

Act of the Parliament of the United Kingdom

Foreign Jurisdiction Act 1890 (Note: Section 19(1).)
- Act of Parliament
- Parliament of the United Kingdom
- Long title: An Act to consolidate the Foreign Jurisdiction Acts.
- Citation: 53 & 54 Vict. c. 37
- Territorial extent: United Kingdom

Dates
- Royal assent: 4 August 1890
- Commencement: 4 August 1890 (Note: The Acts of Parliament (Commencement) Act 1793.)

Other legislation
- Amends: See § Repealed enactments
- Repeals/revokes: See § Repealed enactments
- Amended by: Statute Law Revision Act 1908; Foreign Jurisdiction Act 1913; Merchant Shipping (Safety And Load Line Conventions) Act 1932; Whaling Industry (Regulation) Act 1934; Companies Act 1948; Merchant Shipping Act 1948; Merchant Shipping Act 1950; Statute Law Revision Act 1963; Fugitive Offenders Act 1967; Prevention of Oil Pollution Act 1971; Statute Law (Repeals) Act 1973; Evidence (Proceedings in Other Jurisdictions) Act 1975; Interpretation Act 1978; Companies Act 1985; Statute Law (Repeals) Act 1986
- Relates to: Foreign Jurisdiction Act 1913

Status: Partially repealed

Text of statute as originally enacted

Revised text of statute as amended

Text of the Foreign Jurisdiction Act 1890 as in force today (including any amendments) within the United Kingdom, from legislation.gov.uk.

The Foreign Jurisdiction Act 1890 (53 & 54 Vict. c. 37) is an act of the Parliament of the United Kingdom that consolidated the enactments relating to the exercise of the Crown's jurisdiction outside its dominions.

== Provisions ==
=== Repealed enactments ===
Section 18 of the act repealed 8 enactments, listed in the third schedule to the act.

List of repealed enactments
| Citation | Short title | Long title | Extent of repeal |
|---|---|---|---|
| 6 & 7 Vict. c. 94 | Foreign Jurisdiction Act 1843 | An Act to remove Doubts as to the Exercise of Power and Jurisdiction by Her Majesty within divers Countries and Places out of Her Majesty's Dominions, and to render the same more effectual. | The whole act. |
| 20 & 21 Vict. c. 75 | Jurisdiction in Siam Act 1857 | An Act to confirm an Order in Council concerning the exercise of jurisdiction in matters arising within the kingdom of Siam. | The whole act. |
| 28 & 29 Vict. c. 116 | Foreign Jurisdiction Act Amendment Act 1865 | An Act to explain the Foreign Jurisdiction Act. | The whole act. |
| 29 & 30 Vict. c. 87 | Foreign Jurisdiction Act Amendment Act 1866 | An Act to amend the Foreign Jurisdiction Act. | The whole act. |
| 33 & 34 Vict. c. 55 | Siam and Straits Settlements Jurisdiction Act 1870 | An Act to vest Jurisdiction in matters arising within the Dominions of the Kings of Siam in the Supreme Court of the Straits Settlements. | The whole act. |
| 38 & 39 Vict. c. 85 | Foreign Jurisdiction Act 1875 | An Act for amending the Foreign Jurisdiction Acts. | The whole act. |
| 39 & 40 Vict. c. 46 | Slave Trade Act 1876 | An Act for more effectually punishing offences against the laws relating to the slave trade. | Sections four and six. |
| 41 & 42 Vict. c. 67 | Foreign Jurisdiction Act 1878 | An Act for extending and amending the Foreign Jurisdiction Acts | The whole act. |

== Subsequent developments ==
Section 19(2) of, and the third schedule to, the act were repealed by section 1 of, and the schedule to, the Statute Law Revision Act 1908 (8 Edw. 7. c. 49).

So much of schedule 2 to the act as relates to the Sierra Leone Offences Act 1861 (24 & 25 Vict. c. 31) was repealed by section 1 of, and the schedule to, the Statute Law Revision Act 1963, which came into force on 31 July 1963.

Sections 14, 15 and 17 of, and schedule 2 to, were repealed by section 1(1) of, and part VII of schedule 1 to, the Statute Law (Repeals) Act 1973, which came into force on 18 July 1973.

An entry in schedule 1 to the act was repealed, with savings for orders in council made before 4 May 1976, by schedule 2 to the Evidence (Proceedings in Other Jurisdictions) Act 1975, which came into force on 4 May 1976 .

Section 13(2) of the act was repealed by section 1(1) of, and group 5 of part I of schedule 1 to, the Statute Law (Repeals) Act 1986, which came into force on 2 May 1986. Section 18 of the act was repealed by section 1(1) of, and part IX of schedule 1 to, the 1986 act.
