= Bail Act 1898 =

Act of the Parliament of the United Kingdom

Bail Act 1898 (Note: Section 2.)
- Act of Parliament
- Parliament of the United Kingdom
- Long title: An Act to amend the law with respect to Bail.
- Citation: 61 & 62 Vict. c. 7
- Territorial extent: United Kingdom

Dates
- Royal assent: 23 May 1898
- Commencement: 23 May 1898 (Note: The Acts of Parliament (Commencement) Act 1793.)
- Repealed: 1 January 1953
Other legislation
Amends	Indictable Offences Act 1848
Repealed by	Magistrates' Courts Act 1952

Status: Repealed

Text of statute as originally enacted

The Bail Act 1898 (61 & 62 Vict. c. 7) was an act of the Parliament of the United Kingdom.

It amended the Indictable Offences Act 1848 (11 & 12 Vict. c. 42), which gave justices the power to give bail on sureties, to allow the justices to dispense with the need for sureties if they felt that doing so would not "tend to defeat the ends of justice"; this prevented the unhelpful situation where someone who was at no risk of absconding was kept imprisoned for long periods of time because they could not find the wherewithal to post bail.

== Subsequent developments ==
The whole act was repealed by section 132(1) of, and the sixth schedule to, the Magistrates' Courts Act 1952. (15 & 16 Geo. 6 & 1 Eliz. 2. c. 55), which came into force on 1 June 1953.
