= Metropolitan Police Act 1857 =

Act of the Parliament of the United Kingdom

Metropolitan Police Act 1857 (Note: The citation of this act by this short title was authorised by section 1 of, and the first schedule to, the Short Titles Act 1896. Due to the repeal of those provisions it is now authorised by section 19(2) of the Interpretation Act 1978.)
- Act of Parliament
- Parliament of the United Kingdom
- Long title: An Act for raising a Sum of Money for building and improving Stations of the Metropolitan Police, and to amend the Acts concerning the Metropolitan Police.
- Citation: 20 & 21 Vict. c. 64
- Territorial extent: United Kingdom

Dates
- Royal assent: 25 August 1857
- Commencement: 25 August 1857 (Note: The Acts of Parliament (Commencement) Act 1793.)
- Repealed: 24 March 1948
Other legislation
Amended by	Police Rate Act 1868; Local Government Act 1948
Repealed by	Metropolitan Police Act 1886; Police Act 1890; Local Government Act 1948

Status: Repealed

Text of statute as originally enacted

The Metropolitan Police Act 1857 (20 & 21 Vict. c. 64) was an act of the Parliament of the United Kingdom. The act was one of the Metropolitan Police Acts, granted royal assent on 25 August 1857. It enabled the Metropolitan Police's Receiver to borrow on the Police Rates to raise a sum of £60,000 to spend on purpose-built police stations to replace the lock-ups it had inherited from the parish constable system. It also authorised him to top up the Police Superannuation Fund (an early form of police pension fund) from other Met funds if necessary.

== Subsequent developments ==
Sections 11–14 of the act were repealed by section 147(1) of, and part IV of the second schedule to, the Local Government Act 1948 (11 & 12 Geo. 6. c. 26), which came into force on 24 March 1948.
