= Metropolitan Police (Receiver) Act 1861 =

Act of the Parliament of the United Kingdom

Metropolitan Police (Receiver) Act 1861 (Note: Section 10. The citation of this act by this short title was authorised by section 1 of, and the first schedule to, the Short Titles Act 1896. Due to the repeal of those provisions it is now authorised by section 19(2) of the Interpretation Act 1978.)
- Act of Parliament
- Parliament of the United Kingdom
- Long title: An Act for amending the Law relating to the Receiver of the Metropolitan Police District; and for other purposes.
- Citation: 24 & 25 Vict. c. 124
- Territorial extent: United Kingdom

Dates
- Royal assent: 6 August 1861
- Commencement: 6 August 1861 (Note: The Acts of Parliament (Commencement) Act 1793.)
Other legislation
| Amends | Metropolitan Police Act 1829 |
| Amended by | Metropolitan Police (Receiver) Act 1867; Metropolitan Police Court (Buildings) Act 1871; Police Act 1890; Statute Law Revision Act 1892; Metropolitan Police Act 1899; Local Government Act 1948; Magistrates' Courts Act 1952; Statute Law (Repeals) Act 1974; Statute Law (Repeals) Act 1986; Greater London Authority Act 1999 |
| Relates to | Metropolitan Police Act 1886 |

Status: Amended

Text of statute as originally enacted

Revised text of statute as amended

Text of the Metropolitan Police (Receiver) Act 1861 as in force today (including any amendments) within the United Kingdom, from legislation.gov.uk.

Metropolitan Police (Receiver) Act 1867 (Note: The citation of this act by this short title was authorised by section 1 of, and the first schedule to, the Short Titles Act 1896. Due to the repeal of those provisions it is now authorised by section 19(2) of the Interpretation Act 1978.)
- Act of Parliament
- Parliament of the United Kingdom
- Long title: An Act for amending the Law with respect to the Accounts of the Receiver for the Metropolitan Police District and for other Purposes relating to the Metropolitan Police
- Citation: 30 & 31 Vict. c. 39
- Territorial extent: United Kingdom

Dates
- Royal assent: 15 July 1867
- Commencement: 15 July 1867
Other legislation
| Amends | Metropolitan Police (Receiver) Act 1861 |
| Amended by | Statute Law Revision Act 1893; Metropolitan Police Act 1899; Statute Law (Repeals) Act 1974; Greater London Authority Act 1999 |

Status: Partially repealed

Text of statute as originally enacted

Revised text of statute as amended

Text of the Metropolitan Police (Receiver) Act 1867 as in force today (including any amendments) within the United Kingdom, from legislation.gov.uk.

Metropolitan Police (Receiver) Act 1895 (Note: Section 2.)
- Act of Parliament
- Parliament of the United Kingdom
- Long title: An Act to make provision for the temporary absence of the Receiver for the Metropolitan Police District.
- Citation: 58 & 59 Vict. c. 12
- Territorial extent: United Kingdom

Dates
- Royal assent: 14 May 1895
- Commencement: 14 May 1895
Other legislation
| Amended by | Police Act 1964 |
| Relates to | Greater London Authority Act 1999 |

Status: Partially repealed

Text of statute as originally enacted

Revised text of statute as amended

Text of the Metropolitan Police (Receiver) Act 1895 as in force today (including any amendments) within the United Kingdom, from legislation.gov.uk.

Metropolitan Police Act 1861
- Act of Parliament
- Parliament of the United Kingdom
- Long title: An Act for granting Pensions to some Officers and Men in the Metropolitan Police Force, and for other Purposes.
- Citation: 24 & 25 Vict. c. 51
- Territorial extent: United Kingdom

Dates
- Royal assent: 1 August 1861
- Commencement: 1 August 1861
- Repealed: 1 August 1964 (Note: The Police Act 1964 (Commencement No. 1) Order 1964 (SI 1964/873).)
Other legislation
| Amends | Metropolitan Police Act 1839 |
| Repealed by | Police Act 1964 |

Status: Repealed

Text of statute as originally enacted

The Metropolitan Police (Receiver) Act 1861 or the Metropolitan Police Receiver's Act 1861 (24 & 25 Vict. c. 124), sometimes called the Metropolitan Police District Receiver Act, is an act of the Parliament of the United Kingdom. This act has, in addition to its other short titles, been given the short title the Metropolitan Police Act 1861, but that short title has also been given to the act 24 & 25 Vict. c. 51. The Metropolitan Police (Receiver) Act 1861 is one of the Metropolitan Police Acts 1829 to 1895.

It dealt with the position of Receiver of the Metropolitan Police, repealing parts of Section 25 of the Metropolitan Police Act 1829 (10 Geo. 4. c. 44) (Section 7) and making the office a corporation sole (Section 1). All property vested in previous holders of the role were vested in the current Receiver (Section 2). The Act continued payments into the official Receiver's account at the Bank of England by the Overseers and others (Section 8), though it also removed the Receiver's name from that account (Section 4) and for the Overseers to continue paying into . The Act also removed his personal liability for any debts he incurred in his official capacity (Section 3) and empowered him to dispose of, buy and lease property in the pursuance of his office (Section 5) and to set up allowances for widows and children of men killed in the line of duty (Section 6).

== Later acts ==
Due to the increasing complexity of his role, a second act of similar title in 1867 increased the Receiver's maximum annual salary to £1200, moved the end date for his annual accounts from 31 December to 31 March and stipulated that they be presented to Parliament within thirty days of that date if Parliament was sitting or within thirty days of the start of the next sitting if it was not. A third in 1895 authorised the Home Secretary to appoint a temporary replacement if the Receiver was "temporarily absent from his duties".

== Subsequent developments ==
Section 2–4, in section 5, the words from "and may purchase" onwards, and section 8 of the act were repealed by section 1(1) of, and group 3 of part I of schedule 1 to, the Statute Law (Repeals) Act 1986, which came into force on 2 May 1986.

=== Section 1 ===
As to this section, see Metropolitan Police District Receiver v Tatum.

=== Section 5 ===
So much of this section as relates to any police court was repealed by section 5 of, and the Schedule to, the Metropolitan Police Court (Buildings) Act 1871, "without prejudice to anything done or suffered, or any right acquired or accrued before the passing of this Act".

=== Section 6 ===
This section was repealed by section 36 of, and the Fourth Schedule to the Police Act 1890, subject to the proviso in section 36.

=== Section 7 ===
This section was repealed by section 147(1) of, and Part IV of the Second Schedule to, the Local Government Act 1948, subject to the provisions of section 147.

== Subsequent developments ==
The following enactments were repealed by section 1 of, and the schedule to, the Statute Law Revision Act 1892 (55 & 56 Vict. c. 19), which came into force on 20 June 1892.

- The preamble, and to "as follows"
- In section 4 The words "after the passing of this Act" and "the Governor and Company of"
- Section 7 to "enacted that", and the word "that" before "the certificate"
- Section 10

In section 1 of the act, the words from " and shall " onwards were repealed by section 1 of, and part II of the schedule to, the Statute Law (Repeals) Act 1974, which came into force on 27 June 1974.

== Bibliography ==
- "Metropolitan Police (Receiver) Act 1861". Halsbury's Statutes of England and Wales. Fourth Edition. 2007 Reissue. Butterworths. Volume 33(2). Page 40.
- "Metropolitan Police (Receiver) Act 1861". Halsbury's Statutes of England. Third Edition. Butterworths. London. 1970. Volume 25. Page 267.
- "Metropolitan Police (Receiver) Act 1861". Halsbury's Statutes of England. Second Edition. Butterworth & Co (Publishers) Ltd. 1950. Volume 18. Page 83.
- "The Metropolitan Police (Receiver) Act, 1861". Halsbury's Statutes of England. (The Complete Statutes of England). First Edition. Butterworth & Co (Publishers) Ltd. 1930. Volume 12 . Page 825. See also page 747.
- "The Metropolitan Police (Receiver) Act, 1861". Chitty's Statutes of Practical Utility. Sixth Edition. Sweet and Maxwell. London. 1912. Volume 10. Page 167.
- John Mounteney Lely. "Metropolitan Police Receiver's Act 1861". The Statutes of Practical Utility. (Chitty's Statutes). Fifth Edition. Sweet and Maxwell. Stevens and Sons. London. 1895. Volume 9. Title "Police". Subtitle "Police (Metropolis)". Pages 165 to 167.
- "The Metropolitan Police (Receiver) Act, 1861". The Metropolitan Police Guide. Seventh Edition. HMSO. 1922. Page 95.
