= Police Rate Act 1868 =

Act of the Parliament of the United Kingdom

Police Rate Act 1868 (Note: Section 1.)
- Act of Parliament
- Parliament of the United Kingdom
- Long title: An Act to amend the Law relating to the Funds provided for defraying the Expenses of the Metropolitan Police.
- Citation: 31 & 32 Vict. c. 67
- Territorial extent: United Kingdom

Dates
- Royal assent: 31 July 1868
- Commencement: 31 July 1868 (Note: The Acts of Parliament (Commencement) Act 1793.)
- Repealed: 24 March 1948
Other legislation
Amends	Metropolitan Police Act 1857
Repeals/revokes	Metropolitan Police Act 1833
Amended by	Statute Law Revision Act 1875
Repealed by	Local Government Act 1948

Status: Repealed

Text of statute as originally enacted

Metropolitan Police Act 1912 (Note: Section 2.)
- Act of Parliament
- Parliament of the United Kingdom
- Long title: An Act to amend section twenty three of the Metropolitan Police Act 1829 with respect to the Limit imposed by that section as amended by subsequent enactments on the Amount to be provided annually for the purposes of the Metropolitan Police.
- Citation: 2 & 3 Geo. 5. c. 4
- Territorial extent: United Kingdom

Dates
- Royal assent: 29 March 1912
- Commencement: 29 March 1912
- Repealed: 1 April 1930
Other legislation
Amends	Metropolitan Police Act 1829
Repealed by	Local Government Act 1929

Status: Repealed

Text of statute as originally enacted

Metropolitan Police Act 1918 (Note: Section 3.)
- Act of Parliament
- Parliament of the United Kingdom
- Long title: An Act to amend section twenty three of the Metropolitan Police Act 1829 with respect to the Limit imposed by that section as amended by subsequent enactments on the Amount to be provided annually for the purposes of the Metropolitan Police.
- Citation: 7 & 8 Geo. 5. c. 61
- Territorial extent: United Kingdom

Dates
- Royal assent: 6 February 1918
- Commencement: 6 February 1918
- Repealed: 22 December 1927
Other legislation
Amends	Metropolitan Police Act 1829; Metropolitan Police Act 1912
Repealed by	Statute Law Revision Act 1927

Status: Repealed

Text of statute as originally enacted

The Police Rate Act 1868 (31 & 32 Vict. c. 67) was an act of the Parliament of the United Kingdom in 1868 and granted royal assent on 31 July that year.

== Provisions ==
The act raised the rates for funding the Metropolitan Police from 8 to 9 pence in the pound on the full annual value of all rateable property in parishes covered by the Metropolitan Police District and set an annual housing allowance of £300 for each of the two Assistant Commissioners out of the Met's budget, along with repealing the whole of the Metropolitan Police Act 1833 (3 & 4 Will. 4 c. 89) and section 10 of the Metropolitan Police Act 1857 (20 & 21 Vict. c. 64). That limit and that in section 23 of the original Metropolitan Police Act 1829 (10 Geo. 4. c. 44) was raised to eleven pence in the pound by the Metropolitan Police Act 1912 (2 & 3 Geo. 5. c. 4) and to thirteen pence in the pound from 1918 to the end of the next financial year after the end of the First World War by the Metropolitan Police Act 1918 (7 & 8 Geo. 5. c. 61).

== Subsequent developments ==
The whole act was repealed by section 147(1) of, and part IV of the second schedule to, the Local Government Act 1948 (11 & 12 Geo. 6. c. 26), which came into force on 24 March 1948.
