= Police Act =

Stock short title used for legislation

Police Act is a stock short title used for legislation in India, Malaysia, New Zealand and the United Kingdom relating to police forces and officers.

== List ==
=== India ===
- The Police Act, 1861

=== Malaysia ===
- The Police Act, 1967

=== New Zealand ===
- Police Force Act 1886
- Police Force Act 1913
- Police Force Act 1947
- Police Act 1958

=== Singapore ===
- Police Act of 1856 (Act XIII)

=== United Kingdom ===
- The Police (Property) Act 1897 (60 & 61 Vict. c. 30)
- The Police Act 1909 (9 Edw. 7. c. 40)
- The Police Act 1919 (9 & 10 Geo. 5. c. 46)
- The Police (Overseas Service) Act 1945 (9 & 10 Geo. 6. c. 17)
- The Police Act 1946 (9 & 10 Geo. 6. c. 46)
- The Police Act 1964 (c. 48)
- The Police Act 1969 (c. 63)
- The Police Act 1972 (c. 39)
- The Police Act 1976 (c. 46)
- The Police and Criminal Evidence Act 1984 (c. 60)
- The Police and Magistrates' Courts Act 1994 (c. 29)
- The Police Act 1996 (c. 16)
- The Police (Property) Act 1997 (c. 30)
- The Police (Health and Safety) Act 1997 (c. 42)
- The Police (Insurance of Voluntary Assistants) Act 1997 (c. 45)
- The Police Act 1997 (c. 50)
- The Police and Justice Act 2006 (c. 48)
- The Police (Detention and Bail) Act 2011 (c. 9)

The Police Acts 1839 to 1893 was the collective title of the following acts:

- The County Police Act 1839 (2 & 3 Vict. c. 93)
- The County Police Act 1840 (3 & 4 Vict. c. 88)
- The County and Borough Police Act 1856 (19 & 20 Vict. c. 69)
- The County Police Act 1857 (20 Vict. c. 2)
- The County and Borough Police Act 1859 (22 & 23 Vict. c. 32)
- The Police Superannuation Act 1865 (28 & 29 Vict. c. 35)
- Sections 190 to 194 of the Municipal Corporations Act 1882 (45 & 46 Vict. c. 50)
- The Police Act 1890 (53 & 54 Vict. c. 45)
- The Police Act 1893 (56 & 57 Vict. c. 10)

The Town Police Clauses Acts 1847 and 1889 is the collective title of the Town Police Clauses Act 1847 (10 & 11 Vict. c. 89) and the Town Police Clauses Act 1889 (52 & 53 Vict. c. 14).

Scotland

- The Burgh Police (Scotland) Act 1833 (3 & 4 Will. 4. c. 46)
- The Glasgow Police Act 1800 (39 & 40 Geo. 3. c. lxxxviii)
- The General Police (Scotland) Act 1847 (10 & 11 Vict. c. 39)
- The Police of Towns (Scotland) Act 1850 (13 & 14 Vict. c. 33)
- The General and Police Improvement (Scotland) Act 1862 (25 & 26 Vict. c. 101)
- The Burgh Police (Scotland) Act 1892 (55 & 56 Vict. c. 55)
- The Burgh Police (Scotland) Act 1903 (3 Edw. 7. c. 33)

The Police (Scotland) Acts 1857 to 1890 was the collective title of the following Acts:

- The Police (Scotland) Act 1857 (20 & 21 Vict. c. 72)
- The Police (Scotland) Act 1858 (21 & 22 Vict. c. 65)
- The Police (Scotland) Act 1890 (53 & 54 Vict. c. 67)

Northern Ireland

- The Police (Northern Ireland) Act 1998 (c. 32)
- The Police (Northern Ireland) Act 2000 (c. 32)
- The Police (Northern Ireland) Act 2003 (c. 6)

== See also ==
- List of short titles
