= Police Reservists Act 1902 =

Act of the Parliament of the United Kingdom

Police Reservists Act 1902 (Note: Section 2.)
- Act of Parliament
- Parliament of the United Kingdom
- Long title: An Act to amend the Law as to Pensions and Gratuities of Police Reservists called out on permanent service.
- Citation: 2 Edw. 7. c. 10
- Territorial extent: England and Wales; Scotland; (Note: Section 1.)

Dates
- Royal assent: 22 July 1902
- Commencement: 22 July 1902 (Note: The Acts of Parliament (Commencement) Act 1793.)
- Repealed: England and Wales: 22 June 1906; Scotland: 1 January 1910
Other legislation
Repealed by	England and Wales: Police (Superannuation) Act 1906; Scotland: Police (Scotland) Act (1890) Amendment Act 1910

Status: Repealed

Text of statute as originally enacted

The Police Reservists Act 1902 (2 Edw. 7. c. 10) was an act of the Parliament of the United Kingdom, given royal assent on 22 July 1902 and repealed shortly thereafter.

It provided that if a police constable was called out for permanent service in the Army Reserve as a result of the proclamation of 7 October 1899 (embodying the reserves for the South African War), the police authority was empowered to count any time served in the Reserve as time spent in police service for the purpose of pensions awarded under the Police Act 1890 (53 & 54 Vict. c. 45) or the Police (Scotland) Act 1890 (53 & 54 Vict. c. 67).

The whole act was repealed for England and Wales by the Police (Superannuation) Act 1906 (6 Edw. 7. c. 7), which came into force on 22 June 1906.

The whole act was repealed for Scotland by Police (Scotland) Act (1890) Amendment Act 1910 (10 Edw. 7. & 1 Geo. 5. c. 10), which came into force on 1 January 1910.
