= Police (Superannuation) Act 1906 =

Act of the Parliament of the United Kingdom

Police (Superannuation) Act 1906 (Note: Section 8.)
- Act of Parliament
- Parliament of the United Kingdom
- Long title: An Act to amend the Law relating to the Superannuation of Constables.
- Citation: 6 Edw. 7. c. 7
- Territorial extent: United Kingdom

Dates
- Royal assent: 22 June 1906
- Commencement: 22 June 1906 (Note: The Acts of Parliament (Commencement) Act 1793.)
- Repealed: 28 August 1921
Other legislation
Amends	Police Act 1890
Repeals/revokes	Police Reservists Act 1902
Repealed by	Police Pensions Act 1921
Relates to	Police Act 1890; Police Act 1893

Status: Repealed

Text of statute as originally enacted

Police (Scotland) Act (1890) Amendment Act 1910 (Note: Section 1.)
- Act of Parliament
- Parliament of the United Kingdom
- Long title: An Act to amend the Police (Scotland) Act, 1890.
- Citation: 10 Edw. 7. & 1 Geo. 5. c. 10
- Territorial extent: United Kingdom

Dates
- Royal assent: 26 July 1910
- Commencement: 1 January 1910 (Note: Section 2.)
- Repealed: 28 August 1921
Other legislation
Amends	Police (Scotland) Act 1890
Repealed by	Police Pensions Act 1921

Status: Repealed

Text of statute as originally enacted

The Police (Superannuation) Act 1906 (6 Edw. 7. c. 7) was an act of the Parliament of the United Kingdom amending the system of police pensions for England and Wales established by the Police Act 1890 (53 & 54 Vict. c. 45), Police (Scotland) Act 1890 (53 & 54 Vict. c. 67) and Police Act 1893 (56 & 57 Vict. c. 10). Four years later similar amendments were made for Scotland by the Police (Scotland) Act (1890) Amendment Act 1910 (10 Edw. 7. & 1 Geo. 5. c. 10).

The act allowed forces to let an officer retain his pension entitlement even if he continued to serve after he could have retired without a medical certificate and required them to have an annual medical inspection of such officers and to require them to retire if they proved to be no longer physically fit for further service.

The act also allowed previous service on which a pension had not yet been claimed to be added to an officer's entitlement if he rejoined the police. It allowed time spent back in the armed forces after recall as an Army or Royal Navy reservist also to count towards an officer's pension entitlement, thus repealing and replacing the Police Reservists Act 1902. It also set a maximum age of 65 but allowed a maximum extension of five years if a police authority decided that officer's retirement at 65 "would be detrimental to the interests of the police force".

== Subsequent developments ==
The whole act was repealed by section 35(3) of, and the fourth schedule to, the Police Pensions Act 1921 (11 & 12 Geo. 5. c. 31), which came into force on 28 August 1921.
