= Policing Act 2008 =

Act of Parliament in New Zealand

New Zealand Parliament
- Long title: The purpose of this Act is to provide for policing services in New Zealand, and to state the functions and provide for the governance and administration of the New Zealand Police.
- Royal assent: 16 September 2008
- Commenced: (1) Section 130(2) comes into force on the commencement of the Births, Deaths, Marriages, and Relationships Registration Amendment Act 2008. (2) The rest of this Act comes into force on 1 October 2008.
- Status: Current legislation

The Policing Act 2008 state the functions and provide for the governance and administration of the New Zealand Police. It replaced the Police Act 1958.

The Police Act 1958 was extensively reviewed starting in 2006, after a two and a half year consultative process the Policing Act 2008 came into effect on 1 October 2008. The process included the world's first use of a wiki to allow the public to contribute wording for the new Policing Act. The wiki was open for less than two weeks, but drew international attention. In reaction to the wiki, the Parliamentary Counsel Office voiced concern over "a serious shortcoming of the wiki approach...if used too early in the process it risks constraining public consultation on policy options within the necessarily constricted and precise format required by legislation...secondly, contributors cannot be expected to know and work within the legal, procedural, and policy constraints that apply when the Parliamentary Counsel Office draft Bills"
