= Percival Lane power station Runcorn =

Former power station in England

Percival Lane power station
- Country: United Kingdom
- Location: Runcorn Cheshire
- Coordinates: 53°19′53″N 02°45′25″W
- Status: Decommissioned and demolished
- Construction began: 1920
- Commission date: A: 1921, B: 1941
- Decommission date: late 1960s
- Owners: Mersey Power Company (1921–1948); British Electricity Authority (1948–1955); Central Electricity Authority (1955–1957); Central Electricity Generating Board (1958–1970)
- Operator: As owner

Thermal power station
- Primary fuel: Coal
- Turbine technology: Steam tubines
- Site area: 27 acres 10.93 ha
- Chimneys: A 2, B 2
- Cooling towers: None
- Cooling source: Canal water

Power generation
- Units operational: 3 x 12.5 MW, 3 x 30 MW
- Make and model: 12.5 MW Parsons; 30 MW English Electric
- Units decommissioned: All
- Nameplate capacity: 110 MW (1942)
- Annual net output: 341 GWh (1955)

The Percival Lane power station in Runcorn was built and operated by the Mersey Power Company Limited. It comprised two stations A and B commissioned in 1921 and 1941. The station supplied electricity to commercial, industrial and domestic users over a wide area of 95 square miles around the River Mersey including Widnes, Ellesmere Port and Runcorn.

== History ==
In 1911 the Salt Union built a vacuum evaporating plant at Runcorn to produce salt from brine. Steam was generated to drive turbo-alternators. The exhaust steam from the turbines was used to evaporate brine. Only a portion of this energy was used in the salt works; the Salt Union obtained parliamentary authority to provide a public supply of electricity. This was through two electric lighting orders: the Runcorn Electric Lighting Order 1910 and the Widnes Electric Lighting Order 1901 (Amendment) Order 1910; both these orders were authorised by Parliament under the Electric Lighting Orders Confirmation (No. 1) Act 1910 (10 Edw. 7 & 1 Geo. 5. c. lxxv). A new company, the Mersey Power Company Limited, was formed in 1911 to operate the public electricity supply. In 1918 the company resolved to build a large generating station at Percival Lane, Runcorn (53°19′53″N 2°45′25″W) to meet the expanding demand for electricity. The company had local industrialists among its major shareholders and was able to promote and encourage the use of electricity by local industry.

== Percival Lane ‘A’ low pressure station ==
The first station at Percival Lane was the ‘A’ or low pressure (LP) generating station which was commissioned in 1922.

=== Specification ===
The initial configuration of plant comprised:

- Boilers
  - 3 × Babcock and Wilcox boilers with chain-grate mechanical stokers. The evaporative capacity of each boiler was 45,000 lb/h (5.67 kg/s) – giving a total capacity of 135,000 lb/h (17.0 kg/s). The working pressure was 270 psi (18.62 bar) and steam was superheated to 670 °F (354 °C). A cross section through the boiler house shows the layout of equipment. The boilers supplied steam to:
- Alternators
  - 2 × 12.5 MW Parsons tandem reaction turbo-alternators, generating current at 6.45 kV. The machines have a steam consumption of 10 lb per kWh (4.53 kg/kWh), exhausting to twin surface condensers.
- Ancillary equipment
  - Turbine-driven feed water pumps delivering 175,000 lb/h (22.05 kg/s) of water
  - Induced and forced draught fans the former driven by a 97 h.p. (72.3 kW) motor
  - An 800 tonne coal storage bunker, supplied by a gravity bucket conveyor with a capacity of 40 tonnes per hour
  - Ash handling using a suction plant driven by a 120 h.p. (89.5 kW) motor or by a water trough drag-link conveyor
  - Circulating water system: 14,000 gal per min (1.06 m^{3}/s), pumped by 350 h.p. (261 kW) pumps from the Manchester Ship Canal through 38-inch (0.965 m) diameter pipes
  - Alternator ventilating fans delivering 50,000 cu. ft. (1416 m^{3}) of air per minute.
  - Coal was supplied via sidings on a branch line from the London, Midland and Scottish Railway at Runcorn.

==== Electrical equipment ====
A switch house contained Reyrolle compound-filled gear, which had a rupturing capacity of 750,000 kVA (33 kV switchgear) and 350,000 kVA (6.6 kV switchgear). The 33 kV switchgear controlled two 132/33 kV main step-down transformers, two 6.6/33 kV step-up transformers, and 33 kV lines to Chester. The 6.6 kV switchgear controlled the three generators, the interconnecting and station transformers, and the various trunk feeders. A reactor house contained single-phase British Thomson-Houston reactors. The outdoor transformers had a ratio of 6/33 kV, those for the three Ellesmere Port lines were arranged in three banks, connected delta-star. Other transformers were associated with the two 25 mile (40.2 km) lines to Crewe and the 100 mile (161 km) line to Maentwrog, North Wales. The distribution system included the provision of 161 miles (259 km) of cables and 47 sub-stations.

Supplies of electricity to consumers were available at 3-phase, 50 Hz, 6.0 kV, 3.0 kV and 440 Volts for industrial consumers and single phase 250 Volts for domestic consumers.

=== Operations ===
The loads and connections on the supply system in 1921-23 were:

Load and connection Percival Lane A 1921-23
| Year | Maximum load kW | Total connections kW | Load factor % |
|---|---|---|---|
| 1921 | 4,900 | 13,050 | 59.4 |
| 1922 | 3,700 | 17,360 | 32.1 |
| 1923 | 7,430 | 19,650 | 45.1 |

In 1922 the Mersey Power Company Limited obtained further statutory powers through the Ellesmere Port and Whitby and District Electricity Special Order 1922. The area of supply of the Mersey Company expanded to about 95 square miles (246 km^{2}).

To meet increased demand, in 1926 a further four Babcock and Wilcox boilers and one further 12.5 MW Parsons turbo-alternator were commissioned.

The electricity sold 1921 to 1926

Electricity use Percival Lane A
| Use | Usage MWh | | | | |
| Use | 1921 | 1922 | 1923 | 1925 | 1926 |
|---|---|---|---|---|---|
| Lighting and domestic | 252.31 | 354.68 | 490.77 | | |
| Public lighting | – | – | – | | |
| Traction | – | – | – | | |
| Power | 23,729.7 | 8,583.57 | 21,679.64 | | |
| Total | 23,982.02 | 8,938.26 | 22,170.40 | 45,725.00 | 50,760.00 |

Electricity sold by the Mersey Power Company in GWh from 1923–36

The effect on sales of electricity during depression 1929 to 1933 is demonstrated in the graph. The sale of electricity generated an income to the company of £45,930 in 1922 and £72,853 in 1923. This gave a surplus of revenue over expenses of £2,863 in 1922 and £15,382 in 1923. Subsequent company profits were £32,974 (1925); £59,297 (1926); £65,116 (1927).

In 1923 another generating station was operated by the company. This was the Weston Point gas-fired station comprising two 750 kW gas fired generators.

=== National Grid ===
Under the terms of the Electricity (Supply) Act 1926 (16-17 Geo. 5 c. 51) the Central Electricity Board (CEB) was established. The CEB identified high efficiency ‘selected’ power station that would supply electricity most effectively; Percival Lane was designated a selected station. The CEB also constructed the national grid (1927–33) to connect power stations within a region. Percival Lane was a critical part of the grid as it formed the connecting point between the North West England and North Wales schemes and the Central England scheme.

The grid enabled the company to provide bulk supplies of electricity to the Mid-Cheshire Electricity Supply Company and to the North Wales Power Company.

== Percival Lane ‘B’ high pressure station ==
The ‘B’ or high pressure station was built on an adjacent site in 1940–41.

=== Specification ===
- 6 × 187,500 lb/h (23.62 kg/s), Babcock & Wilcox boilers delivering steam at 425 psi and 825 °F (29.31 bar and 441 °C). This gave a total evaporative capacity of 1,405,000 lb/h (177.0 kg/s). The steam was fed to:
- 3 × English Electric 30 MW turbo-alternators, generating at 11 kV.

In 1946 Percival Lane power station sent out 603.89 GWh of electricity, operated at a load factor of 60.8 per cent, and had a thermal efficiency of 2.65 per cent.

=== Nationalisation ===
Upon nationalisation of the British electricity supply industry in 1948 under the provisions of the Electricity Act 1947 (10-11 Geo. 6 c. 54) The Mersey Power Company was abolished, ownership of Percival Lane power station was vested in the British Electricity Authority, and subsequently the Central Electricity Authority and the Central Electricity Generating Board (CEGB). At the same time the electricity distribution and sales responsibilities of the Mersey electricity undertaking were transferred to the North Western Electricity Board (NORWEB).

=== Post-nationalisation operation ===
Operating data for post-nationalisation Percival Lane power station is summarised in the following tables.

Percival Lane A LP power station operations 1954–63
| Year | Running hours (or load factor %) | Output capacity MW | Electricity supplied GWh | Thermal efficiency % |
|---|---|---|---|---|
| 1954 | 1226 | 24 | 13.30 | 11.31 |
| 1955 | 1260 | 24 | 15.50 | 12.53 |
| 1956 | 395 | 24 | 2.86 | 9.03 |
| 1957 | 131 | 24 | 0.723 | 5.23 |
| 1958 | 86 | 24 | 0.21 | 2.06 |
| 1961 | 0.5 % | 24 | 0.99 | 6.06 |
| 1962 | 2.8 % | 24 | 5.82 | 2.8 |
| 1963 | 4.04 % | 24 | 8.50 | 11.49 |
| 1967 | (1.2 %) | 24 | 2.542 | 9.99 |

The decline in output from the A station is evident in the fourth column.

The operating parameters for Percival Lane B HP power station were as follows.

Percival Lane B HP power station operations 1954–63
| Year | Running hours (or load factor %) | Output capacity MW | Electricity supplied GWh | Thermal efficiency % |
|---|---|---|---|---|
| 1954 | 6421 | 86 | 297.10 | 22.76 |
| 1955 | 6812 | 86 | 324.82 | 22.49 |
| 1956 | 6072 | 86 | 250.79 | 21.81 |
| 1957 | 5212 | 86 | 206.49 | 21.34 |
| 1958 | 3668 | 86 | 127.59 | 21.80 |
| 1961 | 12.9 % | 86 | 97.19 | 19.33 |
| 1962 | 20.6 % | 86 | 155.56 | 20.47 |
| 1963 | 17.01 % | 86 | 128.13 | 20.54 |
| 1967 | 17.2 % | 86 | 129.74 | 19.34 |

In April 1950 one of the 12.5 MW Parsons turbo-alternators in the A station was transferred to Wallasey power station.

The Percival Lane power station closed in the late 1960s and was subsequently demolition. The 132 kV substation, built to connect Percival Lane to the national grid, is still operational.

== See also ==
- Timeline of the UK electricity supply industry
- List of power stations in England
- Rocksavage power station
