= Wallasey power station =

Former power station in Wirral, England

- Country: England
- Location: Wallasey
- Coordinates: 53°24′29″N 03°02′45″W
- Status: Decommissioned and demolished
- Commission date: 1897
- Decommission date: 1960s
- Owners: Wallasey Corporation (1897–1948); British Electricity Authority (1948–1955); Central Electricity Authority (1955–1957); Central Electricity Generating Board (1958–1970)
- Operator: By owner

Thermal power station
- Primary fuel: Coal
- Secondary fuel: Fuel oil
- Turbine technology: Steam turbines
- Cooling towers: None
- Cooling source: Estuary water

Power generation
- Units operational: 2 x 5 MW, 1 x 12.5 MW
- Make and model: Brush Ljungstrom, English Electric
- Nameplate capacity: 22.5 MW
- Annual net output: 37,250 MWh (1946)

Wallasey power station supplied electricity to the town of Wallasey and the surrounding area from 1897. It was owned and operated by Wallasey Corporation until the nationalisation of the British electricity supply industry in 1948. The power station was redeveloped several times: including the incorporation of new plant in the 1920s and 1950. The station was decommissioned in the late 1960s.

== History ==
In 1896 Wallasey Urban District Council were granted a license to supply electricity. The following year the council applied for a provisional order under the Electric Lighting Acts to generate and supply electricity to the town. The Wallasey Electric Lighting Order 1897 was granted by the Board of Trade and was confirmed by Parliament through the Electric Lighting Orders Confirmation (No. 6) Act 1897 (60 & 61 Vict. c. lxvi). The power station first supplied electricity on 1 February 1897.

In 1913 the Wallasey electricity committee noted that the demand for power was greater than the supply available. It proposed that a power station should be built in Limekiln Lane Poulton (53°24′29″N 3°02′45″W) at a cost of £60,000 to £65,000.

== Equipment specification ==
The original plant at Wallasey comprised vertical compound engines coupled directly to Ferranti flywheel alternators. In 1898 the generating capacity was 150 kW, with 1,200 kW ready for installation, and 1,300 kW was on order.

=== Post-war plant ===
The present station was established in 1915 with two 3,000-kW turbo-generators by the Metropolitan-Vickers Electrical Co., Ltd., and one 1,000-kW set transferred from the old station, the generation being 3-phase. 6,600 V. An additional 5,000-kW Brush-Ljungstrém set was installed in 1922, and a further similar set in 1926.

In 1923 the generating plant comprised:

- Coal-fired boilers generating up to 109,000 lb/h (13.7 kg/s) of steam, this was supplied to:
- Generators
  - 1 × 1,000 kW steam turbo-alternator
  - 2 × 3,000 kW steam turbo-alternators
  - 1 × 5,000 kW steam turbo-alternator

These machines gave a total generating capacity of 12,000 kW of alternating current.

In 1928 a further extension was completed containing two 50,000-lb. boilers and pulverised-fuel equipment. supplied by Messrs. Simon Carves, Ltd.feeding an English Electric 12,500-kW turbo-alternator.

A variety of electricity supplies were available to consumers as:

- single phase, 50 Hz AC at 100 and 200 Volts
- 3-phase, 50 Hz AC at 6,000 and 400 Volts
- 500 V direct current (DC) for traction

=== Plant in 1955 ===
In 1950 a 12.5 MW Parsons turbo-alternator from Percival Lane power station was installed. At Wallasey power station. The plant in 1955 comprised:

- Boilers:
  - 3 × Babcock & Wilcox boilers with stoker firing, each 95,000 lb/h (11.96 kg/s), steam conditions 200 psi and 588 °F (13.8 bar, 309 °C),
  - 2 × Simon Carves boilers, pulverised fuel, each 110,000 lb/h (13.9 kg/s), steam conditions 300 psi and 650 °F (20.7 bar, 343 °C),
  - 1 × Yarrow oil fired boiler, 85,000 lb/h (10.7 kg/s), steam conditions 200 psi and 700 °F (13.8 bar, 371 °C), commissioned in October 1954.
- The boilers had a total evaporative capacity of 290,000 lb/h (36.5 kg/s), and supplied steam to:
- Turbo-alternators:
  - 2 × Brush-Ljungstrom 5 MW turbo-alternators, generating at 6.6 kV
  - 1 × English Electric Parsons 12.5 MW, turbo-alternator, generating at 6.6 kV.

The total installed generating capacity was 22.5 MW, with an output capacity of 21 MW.

Condenser cooling water was drawn from the adjacent dock.

== Operations ==
In 1898 there were 6,040 (8-candle power) lamps connected to the system.

=== Operating data 1921–23 ===
The operating data for the period 1921–23 is given in the table:

Wallasey power station operating data 1921–23
Electricity Use	Units	Year		
Electricity Use	Units	1921	1922	1923
Lighting and domestic use	MWh	1,943	2,081	2,536
Public lighting use	MWh	25	25	25
Traction	MWh	2,446	2,493	2,293
Power use	MWh	4,480	5,791	7,382
Bulk supply	MWh	0	0	367
Total use	MWh	8,894	10,391	12,603
Load and connected load
Maximum load	kW	3311	4374	5250
Total connections	kW	6877	7402	8756
Load factor	Per cent	33.9	30.0	31.0
Financial
Revenue from sales of current	£	–	94,461	98,667
Surplus of revenue over expenses	£	–	23,829	46,091

Under the terms of the Electricity (Supply) Act 1926 (16 & 17 Geo. 5. c. 51) the Central Electricity Board (CEB) was established in 1926. The CEB identified high efficiency ‘selected’ power stations that would supply electricity most effectively. The CEB also constructed the national grid (1927–33) to connect power stations within a region.

=== Operating data 1946 ===
Wallasey power station operating data in 1946 is as follows:

Wallasey power station operating data in 1946
Year	Load factor per cent	Max output load MW	Electricity supplied MWh	Thermal efficiency per cent
1946	48.0	17,850	37,250	15.12

The British electricity supply industry was nationalised in 1948 under the provisions of the Electricity Act 1947 (10 & 11 Geo. 6. c. 54). The Wallasey electricity undertaking was abolished, ownership of Wallasey power station was vested in the British Electricity Authority, and subsequently the Central Electricity Authority and the Central Electricity Generating Board (CEGB). At the same time the electricity distribution and sales responsibilities of the Wallasey electricity undertaking were transferred to the North Western Electricity Board (NORWEB).

=== Operating data 1954–67 ===
Operating data for the period 1954–67 is shown in the table:

Wallasey power station operating data, 1954–67
Year	Running hours or load factor (per cent)	Max output capacity MW	Electricity supplied GWh	Thermal efficiency per cent
1954	3010	17	23.620	14.34
1955	3235	21	30.478	15.43
1956	2713	21	21.368	15.37
1957	594	21	4.501	11.72
1958	1555	21	11.430	13.79
1961	(2.3 %)	21	4.233	11.98
1962	(3.2 %)	21	5.901	12.73
1963	(4.72 %)	21	8.686	12.62
1967	(8.2 %)	16	11.496	13.65

== Closure ==
Wallasey power station was decommissioned in the late 1960s. The buildings were subsequently demolished and the area is derelict (in 2020).

== See also ==
- Timeline of the UK electricity supply industry
- List of power stations in England
- Bromborough power station
