= List of acts of the Parliament of the United Kingdom from 1910 =

This is a complete list of acts of the Parliament of the United Kingdom for the year 1910.

Note that the first parliament of the United Kingdom was held in 1801; parliaments between 1707 and 1800 were either parliaments of Great Britain or of Ireland). For acts passed up until 1707, see the list of acts of the Parliament of England and the list of acts of the Parliament of Scotland. For acts passed from 1707 to 1800, see the list of acts of the Parliament of Great Britain. See also the list of acts of the Parliament of Ireland.

For acts of the devolved parliaments and assemblies in the United Kingdom, see the list of acts of the Scottish Parliament, the list of acts of the Northern Ireland Assembly, and the list of acts and measures of Senedd Cymru; see also the list of acts of the Parliament of Northern Ireland.

The number shown after each act's title is its chapter number. Acts passed before 1963 are cited using this number, preceded by the year(s) of the reign during which the relevant parliamentary session was held; thus the Union with Ireland Act 1800 is cited as "39 & 40 Geo. 3. c. 67", meaning the 67th act passed during the session that started in the 39th year of the reign of George III and which finished in the 40th year of that reign. Note that the modern convention is to use Arabic numerals in citations (thus "41 Geo. 3" rather than "41 Geo. III"). Acts of the last session of the Parliament of Great Britain and the first session of the Parliament of the United Kingdom are both cited as "41 Geo. 3". Acts passed from 1963 onwards are simply cited by calendar year and chapter number.

== 10 Edw. 7 & 1 Geo. 5 ==
The 29th Parliament of the United Kingdom, which met from 15 February 1910 until 28 November 1910.

This session was also traditionally cited as 10 Edw. 7, 10 Ed. 7, 10 E. 7, 10 Ed. 7 & 1 Geo. 5, 10 E. 7 & 1 G. 5 or 10 E. 7 & 1 G. 5.

=== Public general acts ===
Short title	Citation	Royal assent
Long title
Treasury (Temporary Borrowing) Act 1910 (repealed)	10 Edw. 7 & 1 Geo. 5. c. 1	8 March 1910
An Act to extend the Powers of the Treasury to borrow under the Consolidated Fund (No. 2) Act, 1909, (Note: Consolidated Fund (No. 2) Act 1909 (9 Edw. 7. c. 2)) and the Appropriation Act, 1909, (Note: Appropriation Act 1909 (9 Edw. 7. c. 5)) and to suspend in part the payment of the New Sinking Fund. (Repealed by Statute Law Revision Act 1927 (17 & 18 Geo. 5. c. 42))
War Loan (Redemption) Act 1910 (repealed)	10 Edw. 7 & 1 Geo. 5. c. 2	8 March 1910
An Act to provide for the Raising of Money for the Redemption of War Stock and War Bonds created under the War Loan Act, 1900, (Note: War Loan Act 1900 (63 & 64 Vict. c. 2)) and for other purposes incidental to that redemption. (Repealed by Statute Law Revision Act 1927 (17 & 18 Geo. 5. c. 42))
Ancient Monuments Protection Act 1910 (repealed)	10 Edw. 7 & 1 Geo. 5. c. 3	24 March 1910
An Act to amend the Ancient Monuments Protection Acts, 1882 to 1900, with respect to the gift, devise, or bequest of monuments to the Commissioners of Works. (Repealed for England and Wales and Scotland by Ancient Monuments Consolidation and Amendment Act 1913 (3 & 4 Geo. 5. c. 32) and for Northern Ireland by Ancient Monuments Act (Northern Ireland) 1926 (16 & 17 Geo. 5. c. 12 (N.I.)))
Consolidated Fund (No. 1) Act 1910 (repealed)	10 Edw. 7 & 1 Geo. 5. c. 4	24 March 1910
An Act to apply certain sums out of the Consolidated Fund to the service of the years ending on the thirty-first day of March one thousand nine hundred and nine, one thousand nine hundred and ten, and one thousand nine hundred and eleven. (Repealed by Statute Law Revision Act 1927 (17 & 18 Geo. 5. c. 42))
East India Loans (Railways and Irrigation) Act 1910 (repealed)	10 Edw. 7 & 1 Geo. 5. c. 5	24 March 1910
An Act to empower the Secretary of State in Council of India to raise Money in the United Kingdom for Public Works purposes. (Repealed by East India Loans Act 1937 (1 Edw. 8 & 1 Geo. 6. c. 14))
Army (Annual) Act 1910 (repealed)	10 Edw. 7 & 1 Geo. 5. c. 6	29 April 1910
An Act to provide during Twelve Months, for the Discipline and Regulation of the Army. (Repealed by Statute Law Revision Act 1927 (17 & 18 Geo. 5. c. 42) and Revision of the Army and Air Force Acts (Transitional Provisions) Act 1955 (3 & 4 Eliz. 2. c. 20))
Development and Road Improvement Funds Act 1910 (repealed)	10 Edw. 7 & 1 Geo. 5. c. 7	29 April 1910
An Act to amend the Development and Road Improvement Funds Act, 1909. (Note: Development and Road Improvement Funds Act 1909 (9 Edw. 7. c. 47)) (Repealed for England and Wales and Scotland by Miscellaneous Financial Provisions Act 1983 (c. 29) and for Northern Ireland by Roads (Northern Ireland) Order 1980 (SI 1980/1085 (N.I. 11)))
Finance (1909-10) Act 1910 (Note: This was the last public act of the reign of King Edward VII.)	10 Edw. 7 & 1 Geo. 5. c. 8	29 April 1910
An Act to grant certain Duties of Customs and Inland Revenue (including Excise), to alter other Duties, and to amend the Law relating to Customs and Inland Revenue (including Excise), and to make other financial provisions.
Consolidated Fund (No. 2) Act 1910 (Note: This was the first public act of the reign of King George V.) (repealed)	10 Edw. 7 & 1 Geo. 5. c. 9	17 June 1910
An Act to apply a sum out of the Consolidated Fund to the service of the year ending on the thirty-first day of March one thousand nine hundred and eleven. (Repealed by Statute Law Revision Act 1927 (17 & 18 Geo. 5. c. 42))
Police (Scotland) Act (1890) Amendment Act 1910 or the Police Superannuation (Scotland) Act 1910 (repealed)	10 Edw. 7 & 1 Geo. 5. c. 10	26 July 1910
An Act to amend the Police (Scotland) Act, 1890. (Note: Police (Scotland) Act 1890 (53 & 54 Vict. c. 67)) (Repealed by Police Pensions Act 1921 (11 & 12 Geo. 5. c. 31))
Census (Ireland) Act 1910 (repealed)	10 Edw. 7 & 1 Geo. 5. c. 11	26 July 1910
An Act for taking the Census for Ireland in the year nineteen hundred and eleven. (Repealed by Statute Law Revision Act 1927 (17 & 18 Geo. 5. c. 42))
Supreme Court of Judicature Act 1910 (repealed)	10 Edw. 7 & 1 Geo. 5. c. 12	26 July 1910
An Act to provide for the appointment of two additional Judges of the High Court. (Repealed by Supreme Court of Judicature (Consolidation) Act 1925 (15 & 16 Geo. 5. c. 49))
Police (Weekly Rest-Day) Act 1910 (repealed)	10 Edw. 7 & 1 Geo. 5. c. 13	26 July 1910
An Act to facilitate the grant to members of the Constabulary of one day's rest off duty in every seven. (Repealed by Police Act 1964 (c. 48))
Appropriation Act 1910 (repealed)	10 Edw. 7 & 1 Geo. 5. c. 14	26 July 1910
An Act to apply a sum out of the Consolidated Fund to the service of the year ending on the thirty-first day of March one thousand nine hundred and eleven, and to appropriate the Supplies granted in this Session of Parliament. (Repealed by Statute Law Revision Act 1927 (17 & 18 Geo. 5. c. 42))
Mines Accidents (Rescue and Aid) Act 1910 (repealed)	10 Edw. 7 & 1 Geo. 5. c. 15	3 August 1910
An Act to make provision with respect to Organisation for the purpose of Rescue and Aid in the case of Accidents in Mines. (Repealed for England and Wales and Scotland by Mines and Quarries Act 1954 (2 & 3 Eliz. 2. c. 70) and for Northern Ireland by Mines Act (Northern Ireland) 1969 (c. 6 (N.I.)))
Duke of York's School (Chapel) Act 1910 (repealed)	10 Edw. 7 & 1 Geo. 5. c. 16	3 August 1910
An Act to vest in the Commissioners of Works, freed from ecclesiastical uses, the Chapel comprised in the buildings situate in the metropolitan borough of Chelsea, formerly occupied by the Duke of York's Royal Military School. (Repealed by Statute Law Revision Act 1927 (17 & 18 Geo. 5. c. 42))
County Common Juries Act 1910 (repealed)	10 Edw. 7 & 1 Geo. 5. c. 17	3 August 1910
An Act to amend the Juries Act, 1825. (Note: Juries Act 1825 (6 Geo. 4. c. 50)) (Repealed by Courts Act 1971 (c. 23))
Isle of Man (Customs) Act 1910	10 Edw. 7 & 1 Geo. 5. c. 18	3 August 1910
An Act to amend the Law with respect to Customs in the Isle of Man.
Municipal Corporations Amendment Act 1910 (repealed)	10 Edw. 7 & 1 Geo. 5. c. 19	3 August 1910
An Act to amend the Municipal Corporations Act, 1882, (Note: Municipal Corporations Act 1882 (45 & 46 Vict. c. 50)) with respect to the right of Aldermen to vote in the Election of Aldermen and Mayor. (Repealed by Local Government Act 1933 (23 & 24 Geo. 5. c. 51))
Diseases of Animals Act 1910 (repealed)	10 Edw. 7 & 1 Geo. 5. c. 20	3 August 1910
An Act to amend the Diseases of Animals Acts, 1894 to 1909, in respect of the exportation and shipment of horses. (Repealed by Diseases of Animals Act 1950 (14 Geo. 6. c. 36))
Public Works Loans Act 1910	10 Edw. 7 & 1 Geo. 5. c. 21	3 August 1910
An Act to grant Money for the purpose of certain Local Loans out of the Local Loans Fund, and for other purposes relating to Local Loans.
Trusts (Scotland) Act 1910 (repealed)	10 Edw. 7 & 1 Geo. 5. c. 22	3 August 1910
An Act to amend the Trusts (Scotland) Acts, 1861 to 1898. (Repealed by Trusts (Scotland) Act 1921 (11 & 12 Geo. 5. c. 58))
Companies (Converted Societies) Act 1910 (repealed)	10 Edw. 7 & 1 Geo. 5. c. 23	3 August 1910
Act to remove doubts as to the validity of certain Societies into Companies. (Repealed by Statute Law (Repeals) Act 1989 (c. 43))
Licensing (Consolidation) Act 1910 (repealed)	10 Edw. 7 & 1 Geo. 5. c. 24	3 August 1910
An Act to consolidate the Law relating to Justices Licences for the Sale by retail of Intoxicating Liquor and to the Registration of Clubs. (Repealed by Licensing Act 1953 (1 & 2 Eliz. 2. c. 46))
Children Act (1908) Amendment Act 1910 (repealed)	10 Edw. 7 & 1 Geo. 5. c. 25	3 August 1910
An Act to amend sections seventeen and eighteen of the Children Act, 1908. (Note: Children Act 1908 (8 Edw. 7. c. 67)) (Repealed for England and Wales by Children and Young Persons Act 1933 (23 & 24 Geo. 5. c. 12) (Note: Incorrectly cited as "1932 c 12" in the Chronological Table of the Statutes.), for Scotland by Children and Young Persons (Scotland) Act 1937 (1 Edw. 8 & 1 Geo. 6. c. 37) and for Northern Ireland by Children and Young Persons Act (Northern Ireland) 1950 (c. 5 (N.I.)))
Regency Act 1910 (repealed)	10 Edw. 7 & 1 Geo. 5. c. 26	3 August 1910
An Act to provide for the Administration of the Government in case the Crown should descend to any issue of His Majesty while such issue shall be under the age of eighteen years, and for the care and guardianship of such issue. (Repealed by Statute Law Revision Act 1927 (17 & 18 Geo. 5. c. 42))
Census (Great Britain) Act 1910 (repealed)	10 Edw. 7 & 1 Geo. 5. c. 27	3 August 1910
An Act for taking the Census for Great Britain in the year nineteen hundred and eleven. (Repealed by Statute Law Revision Act 1927 (17 & 18 Geo. 5. c. 42))
Civil List Act 1910 (repealed)	10 Edw. 7 & 1 Geo. 5. c. 28	3 August 1910
An Act to make provision for the honour and dignity of the Crown and the Royal Family, and for the payment of certain allowances and pensions. (Repealed by Statute Law (Repeals) Act 1977 (c. 18))
Accession Declaration Act 1910	10 Edw. 7 & 1 Geo. 5. c. 29	3 August 1910
An Act to alter the form of the Declaration required to be made by the Sovereign on Accession.
Agricultural Holdings (Scotland) Amendment Act 1910 (repealed)	10 Edw. 7 & 1 Geo. 5. c. 30	3 August 1910
An Act to amend the provisions of the Agricultural Holdings Scotland Act, 1908, (Note: Agricultural Holdings (Scotland) Act 1908 (8 Edw. 7. c. 64)) with respect to way-going valuations. (Repealed by Agricultural Holdings (Scotland) Act 1923 (13 & 14 Geo. 5. c. 10))
Jury Trials Amendment (Scotland) Act 1910	10 Edw. 7 & 1 Geo. 5. c. 31	3 August 1910
An Act to amend the Law of Scotland relating to Jury Trials in Civil Causes.
Registration of Births, Deaths and Marriages (Scotland) Amendment Act 1910 (repealed)	10 Edw. 7 & 1 Geo. 5. c. 32	3 August 1910
An Act to amend the Law respecting the Authentication of Extracts under the Acts relating to the Registration of Births, Deaths and Marriages in Scotland. (Repealed by Registration of Births, Deaths and Marriages (Scotland) Act 1965 (c. 49))
Hotels and Restaurants (Dublin) Act 1910 (repealed)	10 Edw. 7 & 1 Geo. 5. c. 33	3 August 1910
An Act to remove certain Disabilities and Restrictions attaching to Hotels and Restaurants in the Police District of Dublin Metropolis. (Repealed by Statute Law (Repeals) Act 1993 (c. 50))
Small Holdings Act 1910 (repealed)	10 Edw. 7 & 1 Geo. 5. c. 34	3 August 1910
An Act to provide compensation to tenants on whom notice to quit is served with a view to the use of the land for the provision of Small Holdings under the Small Holdings and Allotments Act, 1908. (Note: Small Holdings and Allotments Act 1908 (8 Edw. 7. c. 36)) (Repealed by Agriculture Act 1920 (10 & 11 Geo. 5. c. 76))
Finance Act 1910 (repealed)	10 Edw. 7 & 1 Geo. 5. c. 35	28 November 1910
An Act to grant certain duties of Customs and Inland Revenue to alter other duties and to amend the Law relating to Customs and Inland Revenue and the National Debt and to make other provisions for the financial arrangements of the year. (Repealed by Customs and Excise Act 1952 (15 & 16 Geo. 6 & 1 Eliz. 2. c. 44))
Expiring Laws Continuance Act 1910 (repealed)	10 Edw. 7 & 1 Geo. 5. c. 36	28 November 1910
An Act to continue various Expiring Laws. (Repealed by Statute Law Revision Act 1927 (17 & 18 Geo. 5. c. 42))
Education (Choice of Employment) Act 1910 (repealed)	10 Edw. 7 & 1 Geo. 5. c. 37	28 November 1910
An Act to enable certain Local Education Authorities to give boys and girls information, advice, and assistance with respect to the choice of employment. (Repealed by Education Act 1921 (11 & 12 Geo. 5. c. 51))
Appropriation (No. 2) Act 1910 (repealed)	10 Edw. 7 & 1 Geo. 5. c. 38	28 November 1910
An Act to apply a sum out of the Consolidated Fund to the service of the year ending on the thirty-first day of March one thousand nine hundred and eleven, and to appropriate the Supplies granted in this Session of Parliament. (Repealed by Statute Law Revision Act 1927 (17 & 18 Geo. 5. c. 42))

=== Local acts ===
Short title	Citation	Royal assent
Long title
Local Government Board (Ireland) Provisional Orders Confirmation (No. 1) Act 1910	10 Edw. 7 & 1 Geo. 5. c. i	29 April 1910
An Act to confirm certain Provisional Orders of the Local Government Board for Ireland relating to King's County Queen's County and the Counties of Meath and Westmeath.
	Ballynacarrig Drainage Order 1910	
	Gully Drainage Order 1910	
	Stoneyford River Drainage Order 1910	
Local Government Board (Ireland) Provisional Order Confirmation (No. 2) Act 1910	10 Edw. 7 & 1 Geo. 5. c. ii	29 April 1910
An Act to confirm a Provisional Order of the Local Government Board for Ireland relating to the Town of Arklow.
	Arklow Urban District Order 1910	
Wear Navigation and Sunderland Dock Act 1910 (repealed)	10 Edw. 7 & 1 Geo. 5. c. iii	29 April 1910
An Act to confer upon the River Wear Commissioners further power with respect to dues rates and charges. (Repealed by Wear Navigation and Sunderland Dock (Consolidation and Amendment) Act 1922 (12 & 13 Geo. 5. c. lxxxiv))
Mersey Railway Act 1910	10 Edw. 7 & 1 Geo. 5. c. iv	29 April 1910
An Act to amend the Mersey Railway Act 1900 (Note: Mersey Railway Act 1900 (63 & 64 Vict. c. cxxxiv)) and for other purposes.
Wicklow Railway Act 1910	10 Edw. 7 & 1 Geo. 5. c. v	29 April 1910
An Act for conferring powers of supply on the Wicklow District Gas Company Limited and for other purposes.
Bankers Guarantee and Trust Fund Incorporation Act 1910	10 Edw. 7 & 1 Geo. 5. c. vi	29 April 1910
An Act to incorporate the Trustees of the Bankers Guarantee and Trust Fund and to enlarge the powers vested in such Trustees and for other purposes.
City of Dublin Steam Packet Company Act 1910 (repealed)	10 Edw. 7 & 1 Geo. 5. c. vii	29 April 1910
An Act to dissolve the Dublin and Liverpool Steamship Building Company and to enable the City of Dublin Steam Packet Company to issue preference stock and for other purposes. (Repealed by Statute Law (Repeals) Act 2013 (c. 2))
Stratford-upon-Avon and Midland Junction Railway (Various Powers) Act 1910	10 Edw. 7 & 1 Geo. 5. c. viii	29 April 1910
An Act for transferring to and vesting in the Stratford-upon-Avon and Midland Junction Railway Company the undertaking of the Northampton and Banbury Junction Railway Company to confer further powers on the Stratford-upon-Avon and Midland Junction Railway Company and for other purposes.
National Provident Institution Act 1910 (repealed)	10 Edw. 7 & 1 Geo. 5. c. ix	17 June 1910
An Act to incorporate the National Provident Institution and to provide for the management of its affairs and for other purposes. (Repealed by National Provident Institution Act 1987 (c. xxii))
Standard Life Assurance Company's Act 1910 (repealed)	10 Edw. 7 & 1 Geo. 5. c. x	17 June 1910
An Act to incorporate the Standard Life Assurance Company and to consolidate and amend the provisions of the various Acts relating to that Company and to provide for the management of its affairs to confer further powers on the Company and for other purposes. (Repealed by Standard Life Assurance Company's Act 1925 (15 & 16 Geo. 5. c. xlii))
Charnwood Forest Railway Act 1910	10 Edw. 7 & 1 Geo. 5. c. xi	17 June 1910
An Act to make provision for ascertaining the holders of the ordinary shares in the Charnwood Forest Railway Company and with respect to the register of shareholders of the Company and for other purposes.
Farnham Gas and Electricity Act 1910	10 Edw. 7 & 1 Geo. 5. c. xii	17 June 1910
An Act for incorporating and conferring powers on the Farnham Gas and Electricity Company.
Morecambe Tramways Company Act 1910	10 Edw. 7 & 1 Geo. 5. c. xiii	17 June 1910
An Act to authorise the use of mechanical power upon the tramway of the Morecambe Tramways Company to confer powers on the Company with respect to capital and for other purposes.
Assam Railways and Trading Company's Act 1910 (repealed)	10 Edw. 7 & 1 Geo. 5. c. xiv	26 July 1910
An Act to vary and define the rights of the holders of certain shares in the capital of the Assam Railways and Trading Company Limited and for other purposes. (Repealed by Statute Law (Repeals) Act 2013 (c. 2))
Gowerton Gas Act 1910	10 Edw. 7 & 1 Geo. 5. c. xv	26 July 1910
An Act to incorporate the Gowerton Gas Company and to enable that Company to supply gas in certain parts of the county of Glamorgan and for other purposes.
Surbiton Urban District Council Act 1910 (repealed)	10 Edw. 7 & 1 Geo. 5. c. xvi	26 July 1910
An Act to make further and better provision with respect to the repair of sewers and drains in the Urban District of Surbiton and for other purposes. (Repealed by Local Law (South West London Boroughs) Order 1965 (SI 1965/532))
Bishop's Stortford, Harlow and Epping Gas and Electricity Act 1910	10 Edw. 7 & 1 Geo. 5. c. xvii	26 July 1910
An Act for amalgamating the Bishop's Stortford and District Gas Company the Harlow and Sawbridgeworth Gas Company and the Epping Gas Company and for vesting in the amalgamated Company the undertakings of the Ongar Gas Company Limited the Newport (Essex) Gas Company Limited and the Much Hadham Gas Company Limited to empower the amalgamated Company to supply Electricity and for other purposes.
Saint Just-in-Roseland Experimental Dock Works Act 1910	10 Edw. 7 & 1 Geo. 5. c. xviii	26 July 1910
An Act to authorise the execution of experimental dock works at Saint Just-in-Roseland in the county of Cornwall and for other purposes.
Southend Waterworks Act 1910 (repealed)	10 Edw. 7 & 1 Geo. 5. c. xix	26 July 1910
An Act to sanction and confirm the construction of existing works of the Southend Waterworks Company to authorise the construction of new works to raise additional capital and for other purposes. (Repealed by Essex Water Order 1970 (SI 1970/786))
Thorne and District Water Act 1910	10 Edw. 7 & 1 Geo. 5. c. xx	26 July 1910
An Act to incorporate the Thorne and District Water Company and to confer power upon that Company to supply water.
Yorkshire Electric Power Act 1910 (repealed)	10 Edw. 7 & 1 Geo. 5. c. xxi	26 July 1910
An Act to confer further powers upon the Yorkshire Electric Power Company and for other purposes. (Repealed by Statute Law (Repeals) Act 1989 (c. 43))
Great Western Railway (General Powers) Act 1910	10 Edw. 7 & 1 Geo. 5. c. xxii	26 July 1910
An Act for conferring further powers upon the Great Western Railway Company in respect of their undertaking for amalgamating the Bala and Festiniog Railway Company with the Great Western Railway Company and for other purposes.
Garnant Gas Act 1910 (repealed)	10 Edw. 7 & 1 Geo. 5. c. xxiii	26 July 1910
An Act for incorporating and conferring powers upon the Garnant Gas Company. (Repealed by Ammanford Gas Act 1919 (9 & 10 Geo. 5. c. ciii))
Provident Association of London Act 1910	10 Edw. 7 & 1 Geo. 5. c. xxiv	26 July 1910
An Act to provide for the transfer of the undertaking of the Provident Free Home Assurance Company Limited to the Provident Association of London Limited and for other purposes.
Tynemouth Corporation Act 1910	10 Edw. 7 & 1 Geo. 5. c. xxv	26 July 1910
An Act to empower the Mayor Aldermen and Burgesses of the borough of Tynemouth to provide additional accommodation for the trade at their fish quays and to acquire lands for the purpose to confer further powers upon them in relation to their fish quay undertaking and for other purposes.
Matlock Bath and Scarthin Nick Urban District Council Act 1910 (repealed)	10 Edw. 7 & 1 Geo. 5. c. xxvi	26 July 1910
An Act to confer further powers on the urban district council of Matlock Bath and Scarthin Nick in relation to their gasworks undertaking and for other purposes. (Repealed by Matlocks Urban District Council Act 1927 (17 & 18 Geo. 5. c. xvii))
Liverpool and London and Globe Insurance Company Act 1910	10 Edw. 7 & 1 Geo. 5. c. xxvii	26 July 1910
An Act to provide for the registration of the Liverpool and London and Globe Insurance Company under the Companies (Consolidation) Act 1908 (Note: Companies (Consolidation) Act 1908 (8 Edw. 7. c. 69)) as a Company limited by shares to convert existing stock of the Company into shares and increase the capital of the Company to convert the Globe Six per Cent. Perpetual Annuities into debenture stock and transfer the Globe Six per Cent. Perpetual Annuity Guarantee Fund to extend the objects of the Company and for other purposes.
Central Argentine Railway Limited Act 1910	10 Edw. 7 & 1 Geo. 5. c. xxviii	26 July 1910
An Act to further extend the powers of the Central Argentine Railway Limited to consolidate its debenture stocks to amend the Central Argentine and Rosario Railway Act 1902 (Note: Central Argentine and Rosario Railway Act 1902 (2 Edw. 7. c. iv)) and for other purposes.
Reading and District Electric Supply Act 1910	10 Edw. 7 & 1 Geo. 5. c. xxix	26 July 1910
An Act to extend the area of supply of the Reading Electric Supply Company Limited to confer further powers upon that Company in relation to their undertaking and for other purposes.
City of London (Tithes and Rates) Act 1910	10 Edw. 7 & 1 Geo. 5. c. xxx	26 July 1910
An Act to authorise the purchase by the Corporation of the City of London of certain tithe rates leviable in the ecclesiastical parish of St. Botolph Without Aldgate and for other purposes.
Railway Passengers Assurance Company (Transfer to North British and Mercantile Insurance Company) Act 1910	10 Edw. 7 & 1 Geo. 5. c. xxxi	26 July 1910
An Act to provide for the transfer of the undertaking of the Railway Passengers Assurance Company to the North British and Mercantile Insurance Company and for other purposes.
London Electric Railway Amalgamation Act 1910	10 Edw. 7 & 1 Geo. 5. c. xxxii	26 July 1910
An Act to amalgamate the Baker Street and Waterloo Railway Company and the Charing Cross Euston and Hampstead Railway Company with the Great Northern Piccadilly and Brompton Railway Company and to confer further powers on the Great Northern Piccadilly and Brompton Railway Company and for other purposes.
Saint Mary Stockport Rectory Act 1910	10 Edw. 7 & 1 Geo. 5. c. xxxiii	26 July 1910
An Act for transferring to the Ecclesiastical Commissioners certain endowments of the rectory of Saint Mary Stockport in the county of Chester and for providing for the re-endowment of the said rectory and for the application of the income and capital of the transferred endowments and for transferring the advowson of the said rectory and for other ecclesiastical purposes.
South Lincolnshire Water Act 1910	10 Edw. 7 & 1 Geo. 5. c. xxxiv	26 July 1910
An Act to confer further powers on the South Lincolnshire Water Company.
Exmouth Gas Act 1910	10 Edw. 7 & 1 Geo. 5. c. xxxv	26 July 1910
An Act for conferring further powers upon the Exmouth Gas Company.
Brighton and Hove Gas Act 1910	10 Edw. 7 & 1 Geo. 5. c. xxxvi	26 July 1910
An Act to confer further powers upon the Brighton and Hove General Gas Company.
East Grinstead Gas and Water Act 1910	10 Edw. 7 & 1 Geo. 5. c. xxxvii	26 July 1910
An Act to confer further powers on the East Grinstead Gas and Water Company and for other purposes.
Egremont Urban District Council (Gas) Act 1910	10 Edw. 7 & 1 Geo. 5. c. xxxviii	26 July 1910
An Act to provide for the transfer of the under taking of the Egremont Gas Light and Coke Company to the Egremont Urban District Council and the acquisition by that Council of gas mains in their district and in part of St. John Beckermet not belonging to the company and to authorise that Council to construct and maintain gasworks and supply gas and for other purposes.
Exmouth Urban District Council Act 1910	10 Edw. 7 & 1 Geo. 5. c. xxxix	26 July 1910
An Act to authorise the Exmouth Urban District Council to construct waterworks and for other purposes.
Worksop Urban District Council Act 1910	10 Edw. 7 & 1 Geo. 5. c. xl	26 July 1910
An Act to authorise the Urban District Council of Worksop to purchase the undertaking of the Worksop Waterworks Company and to supply water within the urban district of Worksop and the neighbourhood thereof and to make further provision in regard to the local government and improvement of the district and for other purposes.
Mansfield Railway Act 1910	10 Edw. 7 & 1 Geo. 5. c. xli	26 July 1910
An Act for incorporating the Mansfield Railway Company and authorising them to construct railways in the county of Nottingham and for other purposes.
Metropolitan Railway Act 1910	10 Edw. 7 & 1 Geo. 5. c. xlii	26 July 1910
An Act to authorise the Metropolitan Railway Company to acquire additional land for the general purposes of their undertaking to extend the periods limited by former Acts for completing certain works to construct further works and subways jointly with other Companies in connexion with their respective undertakings and for other purposes.
Great Central Railway Act 1910	10 Edw. 7 & 1 Geo. 5. c. xliii	26 July 1910
An Act to authorise the construction of new railways and works and the acquisition of additional lands by the Great Central Railway Company and by the Humber Commercial Railway and Dock Company to authorise the construction of a new railway by the Great Central and Hull and Barnsley Railway Companies jointly and to make further provision with respect to the existing joint railways of the Great Central and Hull and Barnsley Railway Companies and for other purposes.
Nottingham Corporation Act 1910 (repealed)	10 Edw. 7 & 1 Geo. 5. c. xliv	26 July 1910
An Act to authorise the mayor aldermen and citizens of the city of Nottingham and county of the same city to construct tramways and street improvements and for other purposes. (Repealed by Statute Law (Repeals) Act 1995 (c. 44))
Belfast Corporation (Tramways) Act 1910	10 Edw. 7 & 1 Geo. 5. c. xlv	26 July 1910
An Act to empower the Lord Mayor Aldermen and Citizens of the City of Belfast to acquire the undertaking of the Cavehill and Whitewell Tramway Company and for other purposes.
Cardiff Railway Act 1910	10 Edw. 7 & 1 Geo. 5. c. xlvi	26 July 1910
An Act to extend the time limited by the Cardiff Railway Acts 1897 (Note: Cardiff Railway Act 1897 (60 & 61 Vict. c. ccvii)) 1898 (Note: Cardiff Railway Act 1898 (61 & 62 Vict. c. cclxii)) 1899 (Note: Cardiff Railway Act 1899 (62 & 63 Vict. c. lxi)) 1903 (Note: Cardiff Railway Act 1903 (3 Edw. 7. c. cxvii)) 1904 (Note: Cardiff Railway Act 1904 (4 Edw. 7. c. cxcv)) 1906 (Note: Cardiff Railway Act 1906 (6 Edw. 7. c. clvii)) and 1908 (Note: Cardiff Railway Act 1908 (8 Edw. 7. c. xxxviii)) for the purchase of certain lands and for the completion of Railway No. 2 authorised by the Cardiff Railway Act 1908 to authorise the Company to raise additional capital and for other purposes.
Wimbledon and Sutton Railway Act 1910	10 Edw. 7 & 1 Geo. 5. c. xlvii	26 July 1910
An Act for incorporating the Wimbledon and Sutton Railway Company and authorising them to construct railways and works in the county of Surrey and for other purposes.
Blackpool Improvement Act 1910	10 Edw. 7 & 1 Geo. 5. c. xlviii	26 July 1910
An Act to empower the Corporation of Blackpool to purchase the sea water baths known as the North Shore Baths in the borough to empower the Corporation to provide and maintain sea water and fresh water swimming and other baths and for other purposes.
Great Grimsby Gas Act 1910	10 Edw. 7 & 1 Geo. 5. c. xlix	26 July 1910
An Act to extend the limits of supply of the Great Grimsby Gas Company and to confer further powers upon the Company.
Baker Street and Waterloo Railway Act 1910	10 Edw. 7 & 1 Geo. 5. c. l	26 July 1910
An Act to empower the Baker Street and Waterloo Railway Company to construct a subway and for other purposes.
Mallow Urban District Gas Act 1910	10 Edw. 7 & 1 Geo. 5. c. li	26 July 1910
An Act to empower the urban district council of Mallow to supply gas and to provide for the transfer of the under taking of the New Mallow Gas Company Limited to the Council and for other purposes.
Midland Railway Act 1910	10 Edw. 7 & 1 Geo. 5. c. lii	26 July 1910
An Act to confer additional powers upon the Midland Railway Company for the construction of works and the acquisition of lands to authorise the County Donegal Railways Joint Committee to subscribe further moneys to the capital of the Strabane and Letterkenny Railway Company and for other purposes.
South Hants Water Act 1910	10 Edw. 7 & 1 Geo. 5. c. liii	26 July 1910
An Act for confirming the construction of works and authorising the construction of new works for conferring further powers upon the South Hants Waterworks Company and for other purposes.
Norwich Charities Scheme Confirmation Act 1910	10 Edw. 7 & 1 Geo. 5. c. liv	26 July 1910
An Act to confirm a Scheme of the Charity Commissioners for the management of various Charities in the City and County of the City of Norwich
	Scheme for the Application or Management of the Charities specified in the First Schedule to this Act.	
Glasgow University (Chair of Clinical Medicine and Chair of Clinical Surgery) Order Confirmation Act 1910	10 Edw. 7 & 1 Geo. 5. c. lv	26 July 1910
An Act to confirm a Provisional Order under the Private Legislation Procedure (Scotland) Act 1899 (Note: Private Legislation Procedure (Scotland) Act 1899 (62 & 63 Vict. c. 47)) relating to Glasgow University (Chair of Clinical Medicine and Chair of Clinical Surgery).
	Glasgow University (Chair of Clinical Medicine and Chair of Clinical Surgery) Order 1910 Provisional Order to vary and extend the deeds of Foundation of the existing Chairs of Clinical Medicine and of Clinical Surgery in the University of Glasgow to extend prescribe and regulate the duties of the said Chairs to provide for the election of the holders thereof and for other purposes.	
Muirhead Trust Order Confirmation Act 1910	10 Edw. 7 & 1 Geo. 5. c. lvi	26 July 1910
An Act to confirm a Provisional Order under the Private Legislation Procedure (Scotland) Act 1899 relating to Muirhead Trust.
	Muirhead Trust Order 1910 Provisional Order to vary the purposes of the Trust and the application of the residue of the trust funds of the late Henry Muirhead to enlarge the constitution of and to confer powers on the Trustees of the late Henry Muirhead for the administration of the said funds and for other purposes.	
St. Mungo's College Order Confirmation Act 1910	10 Edw. 7 & 1 Geo. 5. c. lvii	26 July 1910
An Act to confirm a Provisional Order under the Private Legislation Procedure (Scotland) Act 1899 relating to St. Mungo's College.
	St. Mungo's College Order 1910 Provisional Order to extend the powers of the Governors of St. Mungo's College Glasgow to authorise the application by the Governors of certain funds towards the establishment and maintenance of Chairs of Pathology or Pathological Anatomy and Surgery in the University of Glasgow and for other purposes.	
Land Drainage Provisional Order Confirmation Act 1910	10 Edw. 7 & 1 Geo. 5. c. lviii	26 July 1910
An Act to confirm a Provisional Order under the Land Drainage Act 1861 (Note: Land Drainage Act 1861 (24 & 25 Vict. c. 133)) in the matter of a proposed drainage district in the Parishes of Iken Sudbourne Orford Gedgrave and Chillesford in the County of Suffolk.
	Land Drainage (Suffolk) Order 1910 In the matter of a proposed drainage district in the Parishes of Iken Sudbourne Orford Gedgrave and Chillesford in the County of Suffolk.	
Dunfermline and District Tramways (Extensions) Order Confirmation Act 1910	10 Edw. 7 & 1 Geo. 5. c. lix	26 July 1910
An Act to confirm a Provisional Order under the Private Legislation Procedure (Scotland) Act 1899 relating to Dunfermline and District Tramways.
	Dunfermline and District Tramways (Extensions) Order 1910 Provisional Order to authorise the Dunfermline and District Tramways Company to construct additional Tramways and other Works and for other purposes.	
Kirkcaldy Corporation Order Confirmation Act 1910 (repealed)	10 Edw. 7 & 1 Geo. 5. c. lx	26 July 1910
An Act to confirm a Provisional Order under the Private Legislation Procedure (Scotland) Act 1899 relating to Kirkcaldy Corporation. (Repealed by Kirkcaldy Corporation Order Confirmation Act 1939 (2 & 3 Geo. 6. c. vi))
	Kirkcaldy Corporation Order 1910 Provisional Order to authorise the Corporation of the Burgh of Kirkcaldy to construct and work additional tramways in and adjacent to the Burgh to authorise the Dysart Corporation to contribute to the working of the said tramways to extend the limits for compulsory supply of water by the Waterworks Commissioners of Kirkcaldy and Dysart to authorise the Corporation to acquire lands for the extension of their gasworks to confer further powers on the Corporation in relation to their electricity and gas undertakings to raise additional money for harbour purposes and to purchase and maintain as open spaces the strand of seashore and waste ground adjoining and for other purposes.	
Wemyss Tramways (Extensions) Order Confirmation Act 1910	10 Edw. 7 & 1 Geo. 5. c. lxi	26 July 1910
An Act to confirm a Provisional Order under the Private Legislation Procedure (Scotland) Act 1899 relating to Wemyss Tramways.
	Wemyss Tramways (Extensions) Order 1910 Provisional Order to authorise the Wemyss and District Tramways Company Limited to construct additional Tramways and for other purposes.	
Caledonian Railway Order Confirmation Act 1910	10 Edw. 7 & 1 Geo. 5. c. lxii	26 July 1910
An Act to confirm a Provisional Order under the Private Legislation Procedure (Scotland) Act 1899 relating to the Caledonian Railway.
	Caledonian Railway Order 1910 rovisional Order to confer further powers on the Caledonian Railway Company in relation to their undertaking to extend the periods for the completion of railways and other works and for the purchase of lands to authorise the abandonment of certain branch railways and for other purposes.	
Electric Lighting Orders Confirmation (No. 3) Act 1910	10 Edw. 7 & 1 Geo. 5. c. lxiii	26 July 1910
An Act to confirm certain Provisional Orders made by the Board of Trade under the Electric Lighting Acts 1882 (Note: Electric Lighting Act 1882 (45 & 46 Vict. c. 56)) and 1888 (Note: Electric Lighting Act 1888 (51 & 52 Vict. c. 12)) relating to Navan and Swinford.
	Navan Electric Lighting Order 1910 Provisional Order granted by the Board of Trade under the Electric Lighting Acts 1882 and 1888 to the Navan Urban District Council in respect of the Urban District of Navan in the County of Meath.	
	Swinford Electric Lighting Order 1910 Provisional Order granted by the Board of Trade under the Electric Lighting Acts 1882 and 1888 to the Rural District Council of Swinford in respect of the Town of Swinford in the County of Mayo.	
Local Government Board (Ireland) Provisional Orders Confirmation (No. 3) Act 1910	10 Edw. 7 & 1 Geo. 5. c. lxiv	26 July 1910
An Act to confirm certain Provisional Orders of the Local Government Board for Ireland relating to the Rural Districts of Rathdrum and Balrothery and the Urban District of Warrenpoint.
	Kilpeddar Sewerage Order 1910 Provisional Order to enable the Council of the Rural District of Rathdrum to put in force the Compulsory Clauses of the Lands Clauses Acts.	
	Malahide Waterworks Order 1910 Provisional Order to enable the Council of the Rural District of Balrothery to put in force the Compulsory Clauses of the Lands Clauses Acts and for the alteration and amendment of an Act (Note: Local Government Board (Ireland) Provisional Orders Confirmation (No. 3) Act 1907 (7 Edw. 7. c. cix)) confirming a Provisional Order.	
	Warrenpoint Order 1910 Provisional Order to enable the Council of the Urban District of Warrenpoint to put in force the Compulsory Clauses of the Lands Clauses Acts.	
Local Government Board (Ireland) Provisional Orders Confirmation (No. 4) Act 1910	10 Edw. 7 & 1 Geo. 5. c. lxv	26 July 1910
An Act to confirm certain Provisional Orders of the Local Government Board for Ireland relating to the Rural Districts of Belfast Enniskillen and Rathdown No. 1 and the Urban District of Kinsale.
	Upper Falls Sewerage Order 1910 Provisional Order to enable the Council of the Rural District of Belfast to put in force the Compulsory Clauses of the Lands Clauses Acts.	
	Derrygonnelly Sewerage Order 1910 Provisional Order to enable the Council of the Rural District of Enniskillen to put in force the Compulsory Clauses of the Lands Clauses Acts.	
	Tillystown Sewerage Order 1910 Provisional Order to enable the Council of the Rural District of Rathdown No. 1 to put in force the Compulsory Clauses of the Lands Clauses Acts.	
	Kinsale Order 1910 Provisional Order to enable the Council of the Urban District of Kinsale to put in force the Compulsory Clauses of the Lands Clauses Acts.	
Local Government Board (Ireland) Provisional Orders Confirmation (No. 5) Act 1910	10 Edw. 7 & 1 Geo. 5. c. lxvi	26 July 1910
An Act to confirm certain Provisional Orders of the Local Government Board for Ireland relating to King's County (four) and the Rural District of Larne.
	Boolinarrig Drainage Order 1910 Provisional Order to transfer the business of the Drainage Board for the Boolinarrig Drainage District to the County Council of the King's County.	
	Castlebernard Drainage Order 1910 Provisional Order to transfer the business of the Trustees for the Castlebernard Drainage District to the County Council of the King's County.	
	Derrinlough Drainage Order 1910 Provisional Order to transfer the business of the Drainage Board for the Derrinlough Drainage District to the County Council of the King's County.	
	Frankford River Drainage Order 1910 Provisional Order to transfer the business of the Drainage Board for the Frankford River Drainage District to the County Council of the King's County.	
	Greenisland Sewerage Order 1910 Provisional Order to enable the Council of the Rural District of Larne to put in force the Compulsory Clauses of the Lands Clauses Acts.	
Metropolitan Police Provisional Order Confirmation Act 1910 (repealed)	10 Edw. 7 & 1 Geo. 5. c. lxvii	26 July 1910
An Act to confirm a Provisional Order made by one of His Majesty's Principal Secretaries of State under the Metropolitan Police Act 1886 (Note: Metropolitan Police Act 1886 (49 & 50 Vict. c. 22)) and the Metropolitan Police Courts Act 1897. (Note: Metropolitan Police Courts Act 1897 (60 & 61 Vict. c. 26)) (Repealed by Statute Law (Repeals) Act 2008 (c. 12))
	Order made by the Secretary of State under the Metropolitan Police Act 1886 and the Metropolitan Police Courts Act 1897.	
Gas Orders Confirmation (No. 1) Act 1910	10 Edw. 7 & 1 Geo. 5. c. lxviii	3 August 1910
An Act to confirm certain Provisional Orders made by the Board of Trade under the Gas and Water Works Facilities Act 1870 (Note: Gas and Water Works Facilities Act 1870 (33 & 34 Vict. c. 70)) relating to Brownhills and District Gas Builth Wells Gas Chertsey Gas Cranleigh Gas and Llanidloes Gas.
	Brownhills and District Gas Order 1910 Order empowering the Ogley Hay and Brownhills Gas Company Limited to maintain and continue their existing gasworks at Walsall Wood and to construct and maintain further works and to manufacture store and supply gas to and within the urban district of Brownhills and certain parishes and places all in the county of Stafford.	
	Builth Wells Gas Order 1910 Order empowering the Builth Gas and Coke Company Limited to maintain and continue gasworks and to manufacture and supply gas within the Urban District of Builth Wells and the parishes of Llanddewir Crwm and Rhosferig in the county of Brecknock and the parish of Llanelwedd in the county of Radnor and for other purposes.	
	Chertsey Gas Order 1910 Order empowering the Chertsey Gas Consumers' Company (Limited) to raise additional capital and for other purposes.	
	Cranleigh Gas Order 1910 Order empowering the Cranleigh Gas and Coke Company (Limited) to construct and maintain further works for the manufacture and storage of gas and to raise additional capital and for other purposes.	
	Llanidloes Gas Order 1910 Order empowering the Llanidloes Gas Coal and Coke Company Limited to maintain and continue gasworks and to manufacture and supply gas within the borough of Llanidloes in the county of Montgomery.	
Gas Orders Confirmation (No. 2) Act 1910	10 Edw. 7 & 1 Geo. 5. c. lxix	3 August 1910
An Act to confirm certain Provisional Orders made by the Board of Trade under the Gas and Water Works Facilities Act 1870 relating to Burnham Gas Dinnington and District Gas Highbridge Gas and Pinner Gas.
	Burnham (Somerset) Gas Order 1910 Order authorising the maintenance and continuance of existing gasworks and works connected therewith and the manufacture and supply of gas in the parish and urban district of Burnham and parts of the parishes of Burnham Without Brent Knoll and Berrow all in the county of Somerset.	
	Dinnington and District Gas Order 1910 Order empowering the Dinnington and District Gas Company Limited to maintain and continue gasworks and to manufacture and supply gas in the parishes or townships of Dinnington North and South Anston Saint John's with Throapham Brampton-en-le-Morthen Hooton Levett and Laughton-en-le-Morthen in the West Riding of the county of York and for other purposes.	
	Highbridge Gas Order 1910 Order authorising the maintenance and continuance of existing gasworks and works connected therewith and the manufacture and supply of gas in the urban district of Highbridge and parts of the parishes of Burnham Without and Huntspill all in the county of Somerset.	
	Pinner Gas Order 1910 Order empowering the Pinner Gas Company Limited to raise additional capital for the purposes of their gas undertaking.	
Gas Orders Confirmation (No. 3) Act 1910	10 Edw. 7 & 1 Geo. 5. c. lxx	3 August 1910
An Act to confirm certain Provisional Orders made by the Board of Trade under the Gas and Water Works Facilities Act 1870 relating to Ripley Gas Rowley Regis and Blackheath Gas Sheffield Gas and Swansea Gas.
	Ripley Gas Order 1910 Order empowering the Ripley Water Works and Gas Light and Coke Company Limited to maintain and continue gasworks and to manufacture and supply gas in certain parts of the township of Ripley in the county of Derby and for other purposes.	
	Rowley Regis and Blackheath Gas Order 1910 Order empowering the Rowley Regis and Blackheath Gas Company to supply gas in the township of Cakemore in the county of Worcester to raise additional capital and for other purposes.	
	Sheffield Gas Order 1910 Order making provision with respect to the quality of gas supplied by the Sheffield United Gas Light Company the holding of Ordinary Meetings of the Company and for other purposes.	
	Swansea Gas Order 1910 Order to extend the Limits of Supply of the Swansea Gaslight Company and for other purposes.	
Pier and Harbour Orders Confirmation (No. 1) Act 1910	10 Edw. 7 & 1 Geo. 5. c. lxxi	3 August 1910
An Act to confirm certain Provisional Orders made by the Board of Trade under the General Pier and Harbour Act 1861 (Note: General Pier and Harbour Act 1861 (24 & 25 Vict. c. 45)) relating to Ballochroy Newlyn and Ventnor.
	Ballochroy Pier Order 1910 Provisional Order for the construction and maintenance of a Pier and other works at Ballochroy in the county of Argyll and for other purposes.	
	Newlyn Pier and Harbour Order 1910 Provisional Order for conferring further powers upon the Newlyn Pier and Harbour Commissioners.	
	Ventnor Pier Order 1910 Provisional Order for authorising a widening of the Ventnor Pier and for other purposes in connexion therewith.	
Pier and Harbour Orders Confirmation (No. 2) Act 1910	10 Edw. 7 & 1 Geo. 5. c. lxxii	3 August 1910
An Act to confirm certain Provisional Orders made by the Board of Trade under the General Pier and Harbour Act 1861 relating to Rhyl Torquay and Worthing.
	Rhyl Pier Order 1910 Order for the Extension of the Pier at Rhyl in the County of Flint and other purposes in connexion therewith.	
	Torquay Harbour Order 1910 Order for amending the Torquay Harbour Order 1906 and for other purposes.	
	Worthing Pier Order 1910 Order authorising a widening of the Worthing Pier in the County of Sussex and for other purposes.	
Clydebank and District Water Order Confirmation Act 1910	10 Edw. 7 & 1 Geo. 5. c. lxxiii	3 August 1910
An Act to confirm a Provisional Order under the Private Legislation Procedure (Scotland) Act 1899 relating to Clydebank and District Water.
	Clydebank and District Water Order 1910 Provisional Order to authorise the Clydebank and District Water Trustees to construct additional Works to abandon parts of authorised Works to acquire additional lands and for other purposes.	
Paisley Gas Order Confirmation Act 1910	10 Edw. 7 & 1 Geo. 5. c. lxxiv	3 August 1910
An Act to confirm a Provisional Order under the Private Legislation Procedure (Scotland) Act 1899 relating to Paisley Gas.
	Paisley Gas Order 1910 Provisional Order.	
Electric Lighting Orders Confirmation (No. 1) Act 1910	10 Edw. 7 & 1 Geo. 5. c. lxxv	3 August 1910
An Act to confirm certain Provisional Orders made by the Board of Trade under the Electric Lighting Acts 1882 and 1888 relating to Chesham (Extension) Church Clevedon Dawlish (Amendment) Derby (Extension) Gorseinon Huddersfield (Extension to South Crosland) Ormskirk (Amendment) Runcorn Urban and Runcorn Rural Runcorn (Weston) Smethwick (Amendment) and Widnes (Amendment).
	Chesham Electric Lighting (Extension) Order 1910 Provisional Order granted by the Board of Trade under the Electric Lighting Acts 1882 and 1888 to the Chesham Electric Light and Power Company Limited in respect of an extension of their existing area of supply to include the Borough of Hemel Hempstead and the Parishes of Bovingdon and Kings Langley in the Rural District of Hemel Hempstead in the County of Hertford.	
	Church Electric Lighting Order 1910 Provisional Order granted by the Board of Trade under the Electric Lighting Acts 1882 and 1888 to the Urban District Council of Church in respect of the Urban District of Church in the County of Lancaster.	
	Clevedon Electric Lighting Order 1910 Provisional Order granted by the Board of Trade under the Electric Lighting Acts 1882 and 1888 to the Urban District Council of Clevedon in respect of the Urban District of Clevedon and part of the Parish of Walton-in-Gordano in the Rural District of Long Ashton all in the County of Somerset.	
	Dawlish Urban District Electric Lighting (Amendment) Order 1910 Provisional Order granted by the Board of Trade under the Electric Lighting Acts 1882 and 1888 to the Electric Supply Corporation Limited amending the Dawlish Urban District Electric Lighting Order 1903.	
	Derby Corporation Electric Lighting (Extension) Order 1910 Provisional Order granted by the Board of Trade under the Electric Lighting Acts 1882 and 1888 to the Mayor Aldermen and Burgesses of the Borough of Derby in respect of the Urban District of Alvaston and Boulton and certain Parishes in the Rural Districts of Shardlow and Belper all in the County of Derby.	
	Gorseinon Electric Lighting Order 1910 Provisional Order granted by the Board of Trade under the Electric Lighting Acts 1882 and 1888 to the Gorseinon Electric Light Company Limited in respect of the Parishes of Llandilo-Talybont and Loughor (Borough) and parts of the Parishes of Gowerton and Penderry in the Rural District of Swansea in the County of Glamorgan.	
	Huddersfield (Extension to South Crosland) Electric Lighting Order 1910 Provisional Order granted by the Board of Trade under the Electric Lighting Acts 1882 and 1888 to the Mayor Aldermen and Burgesses of the County Borough of Huddersfield in respect of the Urban District of South Crosland in the West Riding of the County of York.	
	Ormskirk Electric Lighting Order 1900 (Amendment) Order 1910 Provisional Order granted by the Board of Trade under the Electric Lighting Acts 1882 and 1888 to the Urban District Council of Ormskirk for the Amendment of the Ormskirk Electric Lighting Order 1900.	
	Runcorn Urban and Runcorn Rural Electric Lighting Order 1910 Provisional Order granted by the Board of Trade under the Electric Lighting Acts 1882 and 1888 to George Henry Cox and Herman John Falk in respect of the Urban District of Runcorn and a portion of the Rural District of Runcorn both in the County of Chester.	
	Runcorn (Weston) Electric Lighting Order 1910 Provisional Order granted by the Board of Trade under the Electric Lighting Acts 1882 and 1888 to the Castner-Kellner Alkali Company Limited in respect of a portion of the Parish of Weston within the Rural District of Runcorn in the County of Chester.	
	Smethwick Electric Lighting Order 1910 Provisional Order granted by the Board of Trade under the Electric Lighting Acts 1882 and 1888 to the Birmingham and Midland Tramways Limited in respect of the County Borough of Smethwick in the County of Stafford.	
	Widnes Electric Lighting Order 1901 (Amendment) Order 1910 Provisional Order granted by the Board of Trade under the Electric Lighting Acts 1882 and 1888 to the Mayor Aldermen and Burgesses of the Borough of Widnes for the amendment of the Widnes Electric Lighting Order 1901.	
Electric Lighting Orders Confirmation (No. 2) Act 1910 (repealed)	10 Edw. 7 & 1 Geo. 5. c. lxxvi	3 August 1910
An Act to confirm certain Provisional Orders made by the Board of Trade under the Electric Lighting Acts 1882 and 1888 the Electric Lighting (Scotland) Act 1890 (Note: Electric Lighting (Scotland) Act 1890 (53 & 54 Vict. c. 13)) and the Electric Lighting (Scotland) Act 1902 (Note: Electric Lighting (Scotland) Act 1902 (2 Edw. 7. c. 35)) relating to Ardrossan Saltcoats and District Cambuslang (Extension) Cowdenbeath Lochgelly and District and Skelmorlie. (Repealed by South of Scotland Electricity Order Confirmation Act 1956 (4 & 5 Eliz. 2. c. xciv))
	Ardrossan Saltcoats and District Electric Lighting Order 1910 Provisional Order granted by the Board of Trade under the Electric Lighting Acts 1882 and 1888 the Electric Lighting (Scotland) Act 1890 and the Electric Lighting (Scotland) Act 1902 to George Balfour in respect of the Burghs of Ardrossan and Saltcoats and a portion of the Parish of Stevenston in the County of Ayr.	
	Cambuslang Electric Lighting (Extension) Order 1910 Provisional Order granted by the Board of Trade under the Electric Lighting Acts 1882 and 1888 the Electric Lighting (Scotland) Act 1890 and the Electric Lighting (Scotland) Act 1902 to the County Council of the County of Lanark in respect of extensions of the Special Lighting District of Cambuslang in the Parish of Cambuslang in the said county.	
	Cowdenbeath Lochgelly and District Electric Lighting Order 1910 Provisional Order granted by the Board of Trade under the Electric Lighting Acts 1882 and 1888 the Electric Lighting (Scotland) Act 1890 and the Electric Lighting (Scotland) Act 1902 to George Balfour in respect of the Burghs of Cowdenbeath and Lochgelly and the Parishes of Auchterderran Ballingry and Beath in the County of Fife.	
	Skelmorlie Electric Supply Order 1910 Provisional Order granted by the Board of Trade under the Electric Lighting Acts 1882 and 1888 the Electric Lighting (Scotland) Act 1890 and the Electric Lighting (Scotland) Act 1902 to William Cornfoot Philp and Reginald Vandezee Farnham trading together as the Skelmorlie Electrical Supply Company in respect of portions of the Parish of Largs in the County of Ayr.	
Electric Lighting Order Confirmation (No. 4) Act 1910	10 Edw. 7 & 1 Geo. 5. c. lxxvii	3 August 1910
An Act to confirm a Provisional Order made by the Board of Trade under the Electric Lighting Acts 1882 and 1888 relating to Bath (Extension).
	Bath Electric Lighting (Extension) Order 1910 Provisional Order granted by the Board of Trade under the Electric Lighting Acts 1882 and 1888 to the Mayor Aldermen and Citizens of the City of Bath in respect of the City of Bath and parts of the Rural District of Bath in the County of Somerset.	
Local Government Board's Provisional Orders Confirmation (No. 1) Act 1910	10 Edw. 7 & 1 Geo. 5. c. lxxviii	3 August 1910
An Act to confirm certain Provisional Orders of the Local Government Board relating to Aberavon Farnham (Rural) Rochdale and the Tewkesbury Joint Hospital District.
	Aberavon Order 1910 Provisional Order for altering the Aberavon Market Act 1848 (Note: Aberavon Market Act 1848 (11 & 12 Vict. c. cxxxviii)) and the Local Government Board's Provisional Orders Confirmation (No. 3) Act 1900. (Note: Local Government Board's Provisional Orders Confirmation (No. 3) Act 1900 (63 & 64 Vict. c. liv))	
	Farnham Rural Order 1910 Provisional Order to enable the Rural District Council of Farnham to put in force the Compulsory Clauses of the Lands Clauses Acts.	
	Rochdale Order 1910 Provisional Order for partially repealing and altering the Rochdale Improvement Act 1872 (Note: Rochdale Improvement Act 1872 (35 & 36 Vict. c. cxlix)) and the Rochdale Corporation Act 1900. (Note: Rochdale Corporation Act 1900 (63 & 64 Vict. c. cclxxviii))	
	Tewkesbury Joint Hospital Order 1910 Provisional Order for forming a United District under Section 279 of the Public Health Act 1875. (Note: Public Health Act 1875 (38 & 39 Vict. c. 55))	
Local Government Board's Provisional Orders Confirmation (No. 2) Act 1910	10 Edw. 7 & 1 Geo. 5. c. lxxix	3 August 1910
An Act to confirm certain Provisional Orders of the Local Government Board relating to Abertillery New Hunstanton and Stockton-on-Tees.
	Abertillery Order 1910 Provisional Order for partially repealing and altering the Brynmawr Gas Act 1866 (Note: Brynmawr Gas Act 1866 (29 & 30 Vict. c. clv)) the Abertillery Gas and Water Act 1867 (Note: Abertillery Gas and Water Act 1867 (30 & 31 Vict. c. clxxxvi)) the Brynmawr and Abertillery Gas and Water Act 1892 (Note: Brynmawr and Abertillery Gas and Water Act 1892 (55 & 56 Vict. c. cl)) and the Abertillery Local Board (Gas and Water) Act 1894. (Note: Abertillery Local Board (Gas and Water) Act 1894 (57 & 58 Vict. c. lxix))	
	New Hunstanton Order 1910 Provisional Order for altering the New Hunstanton Water and Gas Act 1897. (Note: New Hunstanton Water and Gas Act 1897 (60 & 61 Vict. c. cxxv.))	
	Stockton-on-Tees Order 1910 Provisional Order for partially repealing and altering the Stockton-on-Tees Extension and Improvement Act 1889. (Note: Stockton-on-Tees Extension and Improvement Act 1889 (52 & 53 Vict. c. xcii))	
Local Government Board's Provisional Orders Confirmation (No. 3) Act 1910	10 Edw. 7 & 1 Geo. 5. c. lxxx	3 August 1910
An Act to confirm certain Provisional Orders of the Local Government Board relating to Burnley Southend-on-Sea the Croydon Rural and Merton Joint Hospital District and the Middlesex Districts Joint Small-pox Hospital District.
	Burnley Order (No. 1) 1910	
	Southend-on-Sea Order 1910	
	Croydon Rural and Merton Joint Hospital Order 1910	
	Middlesex Districts Joint Smallpox Hospital Order 1910	
Local Government Board's Provisional Orders Confirmation (No. 4) Act 1910	10 Edw. 7 & 1 Geo. 5. c. lxxxi	3 August 1910
An Act to confirm certain Provisional Orders of the Local Government Board relating to Bolton Burnley Oldham and Sheffield.
	Bolton Order 1910 Provisional Order for altering the Bolton Corporation Act 1905. (Note: Bolton Corporation Act 1905 (5 Edw. 7. c. cciv))	
	Burnley Order (No. 2) 1910 Provisional Order for altering the Burnley Corporation Act 1908. (Note: Burnley Corporation Act 1908 (8 Edw. 7. c. lxxxix))	
	Oldham Order 1910 Provisional Order for altering the Oldham Corporation Act 1909. (Note: Oldham Corporation Act 1909 (9 Edw. 7. c. lxxxix))	
	Sheffield Order (No. 1) 1910 Provisional Order for altering the Sheffield Corporation Act 1903. (Note: Sheffield Corporation Act 1903 (3 Edw. 7. c. cclv))	
Local Government Board's Provisional Orders Confirmation (No. 5) Act 1910	10 Edw. 7 & 1 Geo. 5. c. lxxxii	3 August 1910
An Act to confirm certain Provisional Orders of the Local Government Board relating to Hanwell Harpenden Merthyr Tydfil Pontypridd and Scunthorpe.
	Hanwell Order 1910 Provisional Order to enable the Urban District Council of Hanwell to put in force the Compulsory Clauses of the Lands Clauses Acts.	
	Harpenden Order 1910 Provisional Order to enable the Urban District Council of Harpenden to put in force the Compulsory Clauses of the Lands Clauses Acts.	
	Merthyr Tydfil Order 1910 Provisional Order to enable the Urban Sanitary Authority for the Borough of Merthyr Tydfil to put in force the Compulsory Clauses of the Lands Clauses Acts.	
	Pontypridd Order 1910 Provisional Order for altering the Pontypridd Local Board (Gas) Act 1893. (Note: Pontypridd Local Board (Gas) Act 1893 (56 & 57 Vict. c. ci))	
	Scunthorpe Order 1910 Provisional Order for altering the Scunthorpe Urban District Gas and Water Act 1899. (Note: Scunthorpe Urban District Gas and Water Act 1899 (62 & 63 Vict. c. xcvii))	
Local Government Board's Provisional Orders Confirmation (No. 6) Act 1910	10 Edw. 7 & 1 Geo. 5. c. lxxxiii	3 August 1910
An Act to confirm certain Provisional Orders of the Local Government Board relating to Chesterfield and Wakefield.
	Chesterfield (Extension) Order 1910 Provisional Order made in pursuance of Sections 54 and 59 of the Local Government Act 1888. (Note: Local Government Act 1888 (51 & 52 Vict. c. 41))	
	Wakefield (Amendment) Order 1910 Provisional Order to amend the Wakefield (Extension) Order 1909.	
Local Government Board's Provisional Orders Confirmation (No. 7) Act 1910	10 Edw. 7 & 1 Geo. 5. c. lxxxiv	3 August 1910
An Act to confirm certain Provisional Orders of the Local Government Board relating to Bedford Caerphilly Epping (Rural) Guildford Leek (Rural) Morpeth Richmond (Surrey) and Rotherham (two).
	Bedford Order 1910 Provisional Order to enable the Urban District Council for the Borough of Bedford to put in force the Compulsory Clauses of the Lands Clauses Acts.	
	Caerphilly Order 1910 Provisional Order to enable the Urban District Council of Caerphilly to put in force the Compulsory Clauses of the Lands Clauses Acts.	
	Epping Rural Order 1910 Provisional Order to enable the Rural District Council of Epping to put in force the Compulsory Clauses of the Lands Clauses Acts.	
	Guildford Order 1910 Provisional Order to enable the Urban District Council for the Order. Borough of Guildford to put in force the Compulsory Clauses of the Lands Clauses Acts.	
	Leek Rural Order 1910 Provisional Order to enable the Rural District Council of Leek to put in force the Compulsory Clauses of the Lands Clauses Acts.	
	Morpeth Order 1910 Provisional Order to enable the Urban District Council for the Borough of Morpeth to put in force the Compulsory Clauses of the Lands Clauses Acts.	
	Richmond (Surrey) Order 1910 Provisional Order to enable the Urban District Council for the Borough of Richmond (Surrey) to put in force the Compulsory Clauses of the Lands Clauses Acts.	
	Rotherham Order (No. 1) 1910 Provisional Order for altering the Rotherham Gaslight Act 1855 (Note: Rotherham Gaslight Act 1855 (18 & 19 Vict. c. xxxii)) the Rotherham and Kimberworth Local Board of Health Act 1870 (Note: Rotherham and Kimberworth Local Board of Health Act 1870 (33 & 34 Vict. c. cxxxiv)) and the Rotherham Corporation Act 1904. (Note: Rotherham Corporation Act 1904 (4 Edw. 7. c. ccxxxii))	
	Rotherham Order (No. 2) 1910 Provisional Order to enable the Urban Sanitary Authority for the Borough of Rotherham to put in force the Compulsory Clauses of the Lands Clauses Acts.	
Local Government Board's Provisional Orders Confirmation (No. 8) Act 1910	10 Edw. 7 & 1 Geo. 5. c. lxxxv	3 August 1910
An Act to confirm certain Provisional Orders of the Local Government Board relating to Brighton Honiton Oxford Torquay and West Hartlepool.
	Brighton Order 1910 Provisional Order for altering the Brighton Corporation Act 1896 (Note: Brighton Corporation Act 1896 (59 & 60 Vict. c. ccxxi)) and the Brighton Corporation Act 1901. (Note: Brighton Corporation Act 1901 (1 Edw. 7. c. ccxxiv))	
	Honiton Order 1910 Provisional Order for repealing a Local Act of the 30th year of King George III. Chapter XXV. (Note: Honiton Improvement Act 1790 (30 Geo. 3. c. 25)) and a certain Confirming Act. (Note: Local Government Board's Provisional Orders Confirmation Act 1885 (48 & 49 Vict. c. i))	
	Oxford Water Order 1910 Provisional Order for altering the Oxford (Corporation) Waterworks Act 1875 (Note: Oxford (Corporation) Waterworks Act 1875 (38 & 39 Vict. c. xli)) and the Oxford (Corporation) Waterworks Act 1885. (Note: Oxford (Corporation) Waterworks Act 1885 (48 & 49 Vict. c. xxiv))	
	Torquay Order 1910 Provisional Order for partially repealing and altering the Torquay Harbour and District Act 1886. (Note: Torquay Harbour and District Act 1886 (49 & 50 Vict. c. cxix))	
	West Hartlepool Order 1910 Provisional Order for altering the West Hartlepool Extension and Improvement Act 1870. (Note: West Hartlepool Extension and Improvement Act 1870 (33 & 34 Vict. c. cxiii))	
Local Government Board's Provisional Orders Confirmation (No. 9) Act 1910	10 Edw. 7 & 1 Geo. 5. c. lxxxvi	3 August 1910
An Act to confirm certain Provisional Orders of the Local Government Board relating to Ashton-under-Lyne Blackburn Carlisle Leigh-on-Sea Newcastle-upon-Tyne and Sheffield (two).
	Ashton-under-Lyne Order 1910 Provisional Order for altering the Ashton-under-Lyne Improvement Act 1877 (Note: Ashton-under-Lyne Improvement Act 1877 (40 & 41 Vict. c. clxxi)) and the Local Government Board's Provisional Orders Confirmation (No. 6) Act 1882. (Note: Local Government Board's Provisional Orders Confirmation (No. 6) Act 1882 (45 & 46 Vict. c. lxiii))	
	Blackburn Order 1910 Provisional Order for partially repealing and altering the Blackburn Corporation Act 1901. (Note: Blackburn Corporation Act 1901 (1 Edw. 7. c. ccxxiii))	
	Carlisle Order 1910 Provisional Order for altering the Carlisle Corporation (Water) Act 1898 (Note: Carlisle Corporation (Water) Act 1898 (61 & 62 Vict. c. ccxxv)) and the Carlisle Corporation Act 1906. (Note: Carlisle Corporation Act 1906 (6 Edw. 7. c. xii))	
	Leigh-on-Sea Order 1910 Provisional Order for partially repealing and altering the Leigh-on-Sea Urban District Council Act 1899. (Note: Leigh-on-Sea Urban District Council Act 1899 (62 & 63 Vict. c. ccxvii))	
	Newcastle-upon-Tyne Order 1910 Provisional Order for altering the Newcastle-upon-Tyne Corporation Act 1904. (Note: Newcastle-upon-Tyne Corporation Act 1904 (4 Edw. 7. c. ccxx))	
	Sheffield Order (No. 2) 1910 Provisional Order to enable the Urban Sanitary Authority for the City of Sheffield to put in force the Compulsory Clauses of the Lands Clauses Acts.	
	Sheffield Order (No. 3) 1910 Provisional Order for partially repealing and altering certain Local Acts (Note: Sheffield Corporation (Water) Act 1887 (50 & 51 Vict. c. clxxviii)) (Note: Sheffield Corporation Water Act 1896 (59 & 60 Vict. c. cxc)) (Note: Sheffield Corporation Act 1903 (3 Edw. 7. c. cclv)) and a Confirming Act. (Note: Local Government Board's Provisional Orders Confirmation (No. 8) Act 1889 (52 & 53 Vict. c. lxi))	
Local Government Board's Provisional Orders Confirmation (No. 10) Act 1910	10 Edw. 7 & 1 Geo. 5. c. lxxxvii	3 August 1910
An Act to confirm certain Provisional Orders of the Local Government Board relating to the North East Durham Joint Small-Pox Hospital District the North East Kent United Districts the Conway and Penmaenmawr and the Windsor and Egham Joint Hospital Districts.
	North East Durham Joint Smallpox Hospital Order 1910 Provisional Order for altering a Confirming Act. (Note: Local Government Board's Provisional Orders Confirmation (No. 8) Act 1904 (4 Edw. 7. c. cxix))	
	North East Kent Urban Districts (Medical Officer of Health) Order 1910 Provisional Order for Union of Districts under Section 286 of the Public Health Act 1875 and for partially repealing a Confirming Act. (Note: Local Government Board's Provisional Orders Confirmation (No. 17) Act 1905 (5 Edw. 7. c. cxi))	
	Conway and Penmaenmawr Joint Hospital Order 1910 Provisional Order for forming a United District under Section 279 of the Public Health Act 1875.	
	Windsor and Egham Joint Hospital Order 1910 Provisional Order for partially repealing a Confirming Act. (Note: Local Government Board's Provisional Orders Confirmation (No. 8) Act 1903 (3 Edw. 7. c. cxxxvi))	
Local Government Board's Provisional Orders Confirmation (No. 14) Act 1910	10 Edw. 7 & 1 Geo. 5. c. lxxxviii	3 August 1910
An Act to confirm certain Provisional Orders of the Local Government Board relating to Bath and Bollington.
	Bath Order (No. 2) 1910 Provisional Order for altering the Bath Act 1879 (Note: Bath Act 1879 (42 & 43 Vict. c. lxii)) and the Local Government Board's Provisional Orders Confirmation (No. 9) Act 1897. (Note: Local Government Board's Provisional Orders Confirmation (No. 9) Act 1897 (60 & 61 Vict. c. lxxiv))	
	Bollington Order 1910 Provisional Order for partially repealing and altering the Bollington Improvement and Lighting Act 1862. (Note: Bollington Improvement and Lighting Act 1862 (25 & 26 Vict. c. xxxvii))	
Local Government Board's Provisional Order Confirmation (No. 15) Act 1910 (repealed)	10 Edw. 7 & 1 Geo. 5. c. lxxxix	3 August 1910
An Act to confirm a Provisional Order of the Local Government Board relating to Wallsend. (Repealed by Tyne & Wear Act 1980 (c. xliii))
	Wallsend Order 1910 Provisional Order made in pursuance of Sections 54 and 59 of the Local Government Act 1888.	
Education Board Provisional Order Confirmation (London) Act 1910	10 Edw. 7 & 1 Geo. 5. c. xc	3 August 1910
An Act to confirm a Provisional Order made by the Board of Education under the Education Acts 1870 to 1907 to enable the London County Council to put in force the Lands Clauses Acts.
	London County Council Order 1910 Provisional Order for putting in force the Lands Clauses Acts.	
Education Board Provisional Orders Confirmation (Berks., &c.) Act 1910	10 Edw. 7 & 1 Geo. 5. c. xci	3 August 1910
An Act to confirm certain Provisional Orders made by the Board of Education under the Education Acts 1870 to 1907 to enable the Councils of the Administrative Counties of Berks and Surrey the County Boroughs of Birmingham and Swansea and the Urban District of Rhondda to put in force the Lands Clauses Acts.
	Berkshire County Council Order 1910 Provisional Order for putting in force the Lands Clauses Acts.	
	Surrey County Council (No. 1) Order 1910 Provisional Order (No. 1) for putting in force the Lands Clauses Acts.	
	Surrey County Council (No. 2) Order 1910 Provisional Order (No. 2) for putting in force the Lands Clauses Acts.	
	Birmingham County Borough Council Order 1910 Provisional Order for putting in force the Lands Clauses Acts.	
	Swansea County Borough Order 1910 Provisional Order for putting in force the Lands Clauses Acts.	
	Rhondda Urban District Council Order (No. 1) 1910 Provisional Order (No. 1) for putting in force the Lands Clauses Acts.	
	Rhondda Urban District Council Order (No. 2) 1910 Provisional Order (No. 2) for putting in force the Lands Clauses Acts.	
Local Government Board (Ireland) Provisional Order Confirmation (No. 6) Act 1910	10 Edw. 7 & 1 Geo. 5. c. xcii	3 August 1910
An Act to confirm a Provisional Order of the Local Government Board for Ireland relating to King's County and the County of Tipperary (North Riding).
	Parsonstown Drainage Order 1910 Provisional Order to transfer the business of the Drainage Board for the Parsonstown Drainage District to the County Councils of the King's County and the County of Tipperary (North Riding).	
Water Provisional Order Act 1910	10 Edw. 7 & 1 Geo. 5. c. xciii	3 August 1910
An Act to confirm a Provisional Order made by the Board of Trade under the Gas and Water Works Facilities Act 1870 relating to Sutton District Waterworks.
	Sutton District Waterworks Order 1910 order empowering the Sutton District Water Company to extend their Limits of Supply to sanction and confirm the Construction of existing Works to construct new Works and for other purposes.	
Water Orders Confirmation Act 1910	10 Edw. 7 & 1 Geo. 5. c. xciv	3 August 1910
An Act to confirm certain Provisional Orders made by the Board of Trade under the Gas and Water Works Facilities Act 1870 relating to Barnstaple Water Chelsham and Woldingham Water East Kent District Water and South Kent Water.
	Barnstaple Water Order 1910 Order empowering the Barnstaple Water Company to extend their limits of supply and for other purposes.	
	Chelsham and Woldingham Water Order 1910 Order authorising the maintenance of waterworks and the supply of water in the parishes of Chelsham and Woldingham and parts of the parishes of Oxted Limpsfield and Titsey in the rural district of Godstone in the county of Surrey.	
	East Kent District Water Order 1910 Order empowering the East Kent District Water Company to extend their limits of supply to raise additional capital and for other purposes.	
	South Kent Water Order 1910 Order empowering the South Kent Water Company to raise additional capital and for other purposes.	
Highland Railway Order Confirmation Act 1910	10 Edw. 7 & 1 Geo. 5. c. xcv	3 August 1910
An Act to confirm a Provisional Order under the Private Legislation Procedure (Scotland) Act 1899 relating to the Highland Railway.
	Highland Railway Order 1910 Provisional Order to extend the time for the completion of certain Railways authorised by the Highland Railway (Additional Powers) Act 1897 (Note: Highland Railway (Additional Powers) Act 1897 (60 & 61 Vict. c. ccxvi)) and for other purposes.	
Falkirk Corporation Gas Order Confirmation Act 1910	10 Edw. 7 & 1 Geo. 5. c. xcvi	3 August 1910
An Act to confirm a Provisional Order under the Private Legislation Procedure (Scotland) Act 1899 relating to Falkirk Corporation Gas.
	Falkirk Corporation Gas Order 1910 Provisional Order to authorise the provost magistrates and councillors of the burgh of Falkirk to raise further money for their gas undertaking and to confer on them further powers in relation thereto and for other purposes.	
Land Drainage Provisional Order Confirmation (No. 2) Act 1910	10 Edw. 7 & 1 Geo. 5. c. xcvii	3 August 1910
An Act to confirm a Provisional Order under the Land Drainage Act 1861 in the matter of a proposed drainage district in the Parishes of Ince Thornton le Moors Little Stanney Great Stanney Stoke Wervin Wimbolds Trafford Picton Bridge Trafford Mickle Trafford Barrow Guilden Sutton Christleton Tarvin and Cotton Edmunds in the County of Chester.
	Land Drainage (Chester) Order 1910 In the matter of a proposed drainage district in the Parishes of Ince Thornton le Moors Little Stanney Great Stanney Stoke Wervin Wimbolds Trafford Picton Bridge Trafford Mickle Trafford Barrow Guilden Sutton Christleton Tarvin and Cotton Edmunds in the County of Chester.	
Land Drainage Provisional Order Confirmation (No. 3) Act 1910	10 Edw. 7 & 1 Geo. 5. c. xcviii	3 August 1910
An Act to confirm a Provisional Order under the Land Drainage Act 1861 in the matter of a proposed drainage district in the Parishes of Bourne and Thurlby in the county of Lincoln.
	Land Drainage (Lincolnshire) Order 1910 In the matter of a proposed Drainage District in the Parishes of Bourne and Thurlby in the County of Lincoln.	
Port of London (Registration of Craft) Order Confirmation Act 1910 (repealed)	10 Edw. 7 & 1 Geo. 5. c. xcix	3 August 1910
An Act to confirm a Provisional Order made by the Board of Trade under the Port of London Act 1908 (Note: Port of London Act 1908 (8 Edw. 7. c. 68)) relating to the Registration of Craft by the Port of London Authority. (Repealed by Port of London (Consolidation) Act 1920 (10 & 11 Geo. 5. c. clxxiii))
	Port of London (Registration of Craft) Order 1910 Provisional Order of the Board of Trade under the Port of London Act 1908 allowing the maximum fees which may be imposed in respect of the registration or licensing of craft by the Port of London Authority.	
Port of London (Port Rates on Goods) Provisional Order Act 1910 (repealed)	10 Edw. 7 & 1 Geo. 5. c. c	3 August 1910
An Act to confirm a Provisional Order made by the Board of Trade under the Port of London Act 1908 relating to the Maximum Port Rates on Goods which may be levied by the Port of London Authority. (Repealed by Port of London (Consolidation) Act 1920 (10 & 11 Geo. 5. c. clxxiii))
	Port of London (Port Rates on Goods) Order 1910 pProvisional Order pursuant to Section 13 of the Port of London Act 1908 embodying the Schedule of Mаximum Port Rates on Goods which may be levied by the Port of London Authority.	
Tramways Orders Confirmation Act 1910	10 Edw. 7 & 1 Geo. 5. c. ci	3 August 1910
An Act to confirm certain Provisional Orders made by the Board of Trade under the Tramways Act 1870 (Note: Tramways Act 1870 (33 & 34 Vict. c. 78)) relating to Huddersfield Corporation Tramways Milnrow Urban District Council Tramways and Rawtenstall Corporation Tramways.
	Huddersfield Corporation Tramways Order 1910 Order authorising the Mayor Aldermen and Burgesses of the County Borough of Huddersfield to construct additional Tramways in the said Borough and for other purposes.	
	Milnrow Urban District Council Tramways Order 1910 Order authorising the Urban District Council of the Urban District of Milnrow to construct Tramways in their District.	
	Rawtenstall Corporation Tramways Order 1910 Order authorising the Mayor Aldermen and Burgesses of the Borough of Rawtenstall to construct additional Tramways in the said Borough.	
Montrose Water, &c. Order Confirmation Act 1910	10 Edw. 7 & 1 Geo. 5. c. cii	3 August 1910
An Act to confirm a Provisional Order under the Private Legislation Procedure (Scotland) Act 1899 relating to Montrose Water &c.
	Montrose Water, &c. Order 1910 Provisional Order to consolidate the powers of the Provost Magistrates and Councillors of the Burgh of Montrose with respect to their existing Waterworks to authorise them to provide an additional Water Supply and to construct and maintain new Waterworks and for other purposes.	
Fraserburgh Water Order Confirmation Act 1910	10 Edw. 7 & 1 Geo. 5. c. ciii	3 August 1910
An Act to confirm a Provisional Order under the Private Legislation Procedure (Scotland) Act 1899 relating to Fraserburgh Water.
	Fraserburgh Water Order 1910 Provisional Order to authorise the Provost Magistrates and Councillors of the burgh of Fraserburgh to provide an additional Water Supply and to construct and maintain new Waterworks and for other purposes.	
Sidlaw Sanatorium (Transfer) Order Confirmation Act 1910	10 Edw. 7 & 1 Geo. 5. c. civ	3 August 1910
An Act to confirm a Provisional Order under the Private Legislation Procedure (Scotland) Act 1899 relating to Sidlaw Sanatorium.
	Sidlaw Sanatorium (Transfer) Order 1910 Provisional Order to confirm an Agreement between the Trustees and Executive Committee of the Sidlaw Sanatorium for Consumption and the Corporation of the Dundee Royal Infirmary for the transfer to the latter of the Sidlaw Sanatorium for Consumption with its equipment and endowment and for other purposes.	
Wemyss and District Water Order Confirmation Act 1910 (repealed)	10 Edw. 7 & 1 Geo. 5. c. cv	3 August 1910
An Act to confirm a Provisional Order under the Private Legislation Procedure (Scotland) Act 1899 relating to Wemyss and District Water. (Repealed by Fife County Council Order Confirmation Act 1940 (3 & 4 Geo. 6. c. xliii))
	Wemyss and District Water Order 1910 Provisional Order to incorporate a public trust for better supplying with water the parish of Wemyss including the burgh of Buckhaven Methil and Innerleven and districts and places adjacent to abolish the special water supply districts of Wemyss of Buckhaven Methil and Innerleven and of Windygates and Balcurvie to transfer the existing waterworks to the Trustees to be incorporated to sanction the construction and maintenance of new and additional waterworks and for other purposes.	
Shirebrook and District Gas Act 1910	10 Edw. 7 & 1 Geo. 5. c. cvi	3 August 1910
An Act to extend the limits of supply of the Shirebrook and District Gas Company and for other purposes.
Mountain Ash Water Act 1910	10 Edw. 7 & 1 Geo. 5. c. cvii	3 August 1910
An Act to authorise the Urban District Council of Mountain Ash to construct additional waterworks and for other purposes.
Cambridge University and Town Waterworks Act 1910	10 Edw. 7 & 1 Geo. 5. c. cviii	3 August 1910
An Act to confer further powers on the Cambridge University and Town Waterworks Company and for other purposes.
Metropolitan District Railway Act 1910	10 Edw. 7 & 1 Geo. 5. c. cix	3 August 1910
An Act to empower the Metropolitan District Railway Company to capitalise the arrears of dividend on their guaranteed stock to reduce the dividend on their first preference stock and to authorise them and the London and South Western Railway Company to construct new railways and for other purposes.
Padstow Harbour Act 1910	10 Edw. 7 & 1 Geo. 5. c. cx	3 August 1910
An Act to alter and extend the powers of the Commissioners for the harbour of Padstow to authorise the construction of a pier and other works by them and for other purposes.
Havant Gas Act 1910	10 Edw. 7 & 1 Geo. 5. c. cxi	3 August 1910
An Act to incorporate the Havant Gas Company and to enable that Company to supply gas in the urban district of Havant and other adjoining places.
London United Tramways Act 1910	10 Edw. 7 & 1 Geo. 5. c. cxii	3 August 1910
An Act to extend the time limited for the construction of certain works by the London United Tramways Limited and for other purposes.
Southampton Corporation Act 1910	10 Edw. 7 & 1 Geo. 5. c. cxiii	3 August 1910
An Act to authorise the mayor aldermen and burgesses of the borough of Southampton to construct tramways street improvements and an embankment and to make further provision in regard to their tramway and electricity undertakings and the health local government and improvement of the borough and for other purposes.
Barry Railway Act 1910	10 Edw. 7 & 1 Geo. 5. c. cxiv	3 August 1910
An Act to extend the time for the construction of railways by the Barry Railway Company and for other purposes.
London County Council (Money) Act 1910 (repealed)	10 Edw. 7 & 1 Geo. 5. c. cxv	3 August 1910
An Act to regulate the expenditure of money by the London County Council on capital account during the current financial period and the raising of money to meet such expenditure and for other purposes. (Repealed by London County Council (Finance Consolidation) Act 1912 (2 & 3 Geo. 5. c. cv))
Little Hulton Urban District Council Act 1910	10 Edw. 7 & 1 Geo. 5. c. cxvi	3 August 1910
An Act to empower the urban district council of Little Hulton to supply gas and to provide for the transfer to the Council of so much of the gas undertaking of the Salford Corporation as is situate within the urban district of Little Hulton and to confirm an agreement with the Earl of Ellesmere for the supply of gas in bulk to the Council and to make further and better provision with regard to the improvement health and local government of the district and for other purposes.
Bradford Corporation Act 1910	10 Edw. 7 & 1 Geo. 5. c. cxvii	3 August 1910
An Act to confer powers upon the Lord Mayor Aldermen and Citizens of the City of Bradford for the construction of Tramways and Street Works to authorise the use of Trolley Vehicles to alter the style and title of the Corporation and to make provisions with respect to various matters of local administration and management.
East Riding County Council Act 1910	10 Edw. 7 & 1 Geo. 5. c. cxviii	3 August 1910
An Act to amend the Yorkshire Registries Act 1884 (Note: Yorkshire Registries Act 1884 (47 & 48 Vict. c. 54)) in its application to the East Riding of the county of York to vest Hull Bridge in the East Riding County Council and for other purposes.
Middlesbrough Corporation Act 1910 (repealed)	10 Edw. 7 & 1 Geo. 5. c. cxix	3 August 1910
An Act to confer further powers upon the mayor aldermen and burgesses of the county borough of Middles brough with respect to the supply of gas and electricity to establish an accident fund to make further provision for the health local government and improvement of the borough and for other purposes. (Repealed by Middlesbrough Corporation Act 1933 (23 & 24 Geo. 5. c. lxxxiii))
Pontypridd and Rhondda Water Act 1910	10 Edw. 7 & 1 Geo. 5. c. cxx	3 August 1910
An Act to establish a joint board representative of the Rhondda and Pontypridd Urban District Councils with power to acquire the undertaking of the Pontypridd Waterworks Company and to construct works and to supply water and for other purposes.
Rhondda Urban District Council (Tramways, Extensions, &c.) Act 1910 (repealed)	10 Edw. 7 & 1 Geo. 5. c. cxxi	3 August 1910
An Act to authorise the Rhondda Urban District Council to construct additional tramways to make street improvements to confer upon the Council further powers for the better local government and improvement of the district and for other purposes. (Repealed by Rhondda Corporation Act 1973 (c. xxiii))
Fylde Water Board Act 1910	10 Edw. 7 & 1 Geo. 5. c. cxxii	3 August 1910
An Act to empower the Fylde Water Board to construct additional waterworks and for other purposes.
Eastbourne Corporation Act 1910 (repealed)	10 Edw. 7 & 1 Geo. 5. c. cxxiii	3 August 1910
An Act to make further and better provision for the improvement and good government of the borough of Eastbourne for the extension of the borough and for other purposes. (Repealed by East Sussex Act 1981 (c. xxv))
Lancashire and Yorkshire Railway Act 1910	10 Edw. 7 & 1 Geo. 5. c. cxxiv	3 August 1910
An Act to authorise the Lancashire and Yorkshire Railway Company to construct a new railway to widen certain existing railways and construct other works to acquire additional lands and for other purposes.
Abertillery and District Water Board Act 1910	10 Edw. 7 & 1 Geo. 5. c. cxxv	3 August 1910
An Act to constitute and incorporate a water board consisting of representatives from the councils of the urban districts of Abertillery Abercarn Risca and Mynyddislwyn in the county of Monmouth to authorise the Board to con struct waterworks to vest in the Board the waterworks undertakings of the said councils and for other purposes.
Slough Waterworks Act 1910	10 Edw. 7 & 1 Geo. 5. c. cxxvi	3 August 1910
An Act to extend the limits of supply of the Slough Waterworks Company to sanction and confirm the construction of existing waterworks to confer further powers upon the Company and for other purposes.
Bristol Gas Act 1910	10 Edw. 7 & 1 Geo. 5. c. cxxvii	3 August 1910
An Act to confer further powers upon the Bristol Gas Company.
London County Council (Tramways and Improvements) Act 1910	10 Edw. 7 & 1 Geo. 5. c. cxxviii	3 August 1910
An Act to empower the London County Council to construct and work new tramways and to alter and reconstruct existing tramways and to make a new street street improvements and other works to empower the council of the royal borough of Kensington to contribute towards cost of a new street in Hammersmith and for other purposes.
London County Council (General Powers) Act 1910 (repealed)	10 Edw. 7 & 1 Geo. 5. c. cxxix	3 August 1910
An Act to empower the London County Council to execute street works and acquire lands to confer other powers upon that Council and upon sanitary authorities in the administrative county of London to provide for the licensing of employment agencies to empower the council of the metropolitan borough of Camberwell to acquire certain lands and for other purposes. (Repealed by Local Law (Greater London Council and Inner London Boroughs) Order 1965 (SI 1965/540))
Middleton Corporation Act 1910	10 Edw. 7 & 1 Geo. 5. c. cxxx	3 August 1910
An Act to empower the Corporation of Middleton to acquire and utilise the Boarshaw Estate and construct street and other works to confer further powers on the Corporation with regard to their gas and electricity under takings and to make further and better provision with regard to the improvement health and local government of the borough of Middleton.
Glasgow Gas Act 1910	10 Edw. 7 & 1 Geo. 5. c. cxxxi	3 August 1910
An Act to consolidate with amendments the Glasgow Gas Acts 1869 to 1909 and for other purposes.
Oyster and Mussel Fishery (Bay of Firth) Order Confirmation Act 1910 (repealed)	10 Edw. 7 & 1 Geo. 5. c. cxxxii	28 November 1910
An Act to confirm a Provisional Order under the Sea Fisheries Act 1868 (Note: Sea Fisheries Act 1868 (31 & 32 Vict. c. 45)) relating to a several Oyster and Mussel Fishery at the Bay of Firth. (Repealed by Statute Law (Repeals) Act 1998 (c. 43))
	Oyster and Mussel Fishery (Bay of Firth) Order 1910	
Thames Conservancy (Appointments and Tolls) Provisional Order Act 1910 (repealed)	10 Edw. 7 & 1 Geo. 5. c. cxxxiii	28 November 1910
An Act to confirm a Provisional Order made by the Board of Trade under the Port of London Act 1908 relating to the Thames Conservancy. (Repealed by Thames Conservancy Act 1932 (22 & 23 Geo. 5. c. xxxvii))
	Thames Conservancy (Appointments and Tolls) Order 1910 Provisional Order of the Board of Trade under the Port of London Act, 1908, regulating the term of office rotation disqualification and appointment to casual vacancies of the Conservators of the River Thames revising the tolls fees and charges (except the sums which are payable to the Conservators by the Metropolitan Water Board or any water company) leviable by the Conservators and for other purposes.	
Dick Trust Order Confirmation Act 1910	10 Edw. 7 & 1 Geo. 5. c. cxxxiv	28 November 1910
An Act to confirm a Provisional Order under the Private Legislation Procedure (Scotland) Act 1899 relating to the Dick Trust.
	Dick Trust Order 1910 Provisional Order for regulating the application of part of the residue of the estate of the deceased James Dick gutta percha boot and shoe manufacturer Glasgow by his trustees and for other purposes.	
River Don (Salmon Fisheries) Order Confirmation Act 1910	10 Edw. 7 & 1 Geo. 5. c. cxxxv	28 November 1910
An Act to confirm a Provisional Order under the Private Legislation Procedure (Scotland) Act 1899 relating to the River Don (Salmon Fisheries).
	River Don (Salmon Fisheries) Order 1910	
Dundee Gas Commissioners Order Confirmation Act 1910 (repealed)	10 Edw. 7 & 1 Geo. 5. c. cxxxvi	28 November 1910
An Act to confirm a Provisional Order under the Private Legislation Procedure (Scotland) Act 1899 relating to the Dundee Gas Commissioners. (Repealed by Dundee Corporation (Consolidated Powers) Order Confirmation Act 1957 (6 & 7 Eliz. 2. c. iv))
	Dundee Gas Commissioners Order 1910 Provisional Order to economise the Waters of the River Don in the County of Aberdeen and to maintain sufficient water in that River for the passage of Salmon.	
Edinburgh Corporation Order Confirmation Act 1910 (repealed)	10 Edw. 7 & 1 Geo. 5. c. cxxxvii	28 November 1910
An Act to confirm a Provisional Order under the Private Legislation Procedure (Scotland) Act 1899 relating to Edinburgh Corporation. (Repealed by Edinburgh Corporation Order Confirmation Act 1933 (24 & 25 Geo. 5. c. v))
	Edinburgh Corporation Order 1910 Provisional Order to authorise the Lord Provost Magistrates and Council of the City and Royal Burgh of Edinburgh to make and maintain additional Tramways; to construct works; to acquire lands; to borrow money; to amend and extend the provisions of the Edinburgh Municipal and Police Acts; and for other purposes.	
Loch Leven Water Power (Transfer) Order Confirmation Act 1910	10 Edw. 7 & 1 Geo. 5. c. cxxxviii	28 November 1910
An Act to confirm a Provisional Order under the Private Legislation Procedure (Scotland) Act 1899 relating to Loch Leven Water Power.
	Loch Leven Water Power (Transfer) Order 1910 Order to Authorise the Loch Leven Water and Electric Power Company to Sell and Transfer their Undertaking.	
Govan Burgh Order Confirmation Act 1910	10 Edw. 7 & 1 Geo. 5. c. cxxxix	28 November 1910
An Act to confirm a Provisional Order under the Burgh Police (Scotland) Act 1892 (Note: Burgh Police (Scotland) Act 1892 (55 & 56 Vict. c. 55)) relating to Govan Burgh.
	Govan Burgh Order 1910 Burgh Police (Scotland) Act 1892 (55 & 56 Victoria Cap. 55).	
London Electric Supply Act 1910	10 Edw. 7 & 1 Geo. 5. c. cxl	28 November 1910
An Act to constitute the London County Council the purchasing authority in respect of the undertakings of certain Electric Lighting Companies in London to which the London Electric Supply Act 1908 (Note: London Electric Supply Act 1908 (8 Edw. 7. c. clxvii)) does not apply and for other purposes incidental thereto.
Gas Companies (Standard Burner) (No. 1) Act 1910	10 Edw. 7 & 1 Geo. 5. c. cxli	28 November 1910
An Act to provide in the case of certain gas companies for the adoption of the Metropolitan Argand Burner No. 2 as a standard burner in substitution for the various burners now in use of the official testing of the illuminating power of gas supplied by them and for other purposes.
Gas Companies (Standard Burner) (No. 2) Act 1910	10 Edw. 7 & 1 Geo. 5. c. cxlii	28 November 1910
An Act to provide in the case of certain gas companies for the adoption of the Metropolitan Argand Burner No. 2 as a standard burner in substitution for the various burners now in use of the official testing of the illuminating power of gas supplied by them and for other purposes.
Gas Companies (Standard Burner) (No. 3) Act 1910	10 Edw. 7 & 1 Geo. 5. c. cxliii	28 November 1910
An Act to provide in the case of certain gas companies for the adoption of the Metropolitan Argand Burner No. 2 as a standard burner in substitution for the various burners now in use for the official testing of the illuminating power of gas supplied by them and for other purposes.
Leeds Corporation Act 1910	10 Edw. 7 & 1 Geo. 5. c. cxliv	28 November 1910
An Act to empower the lord mayor aldermen and citizens of the city of Leeds to provide omnibuses worked by electricity and to construct a street improvement and for other purposes.
Llanelly Harbour Act 1910	10 Edw. 7 & 1 Geo. 5. c. cxlv	28 November 1910
An Act to confirm and give effect to an indenture between the Llanelly Harbour Trust the urban district council of Llanelly and the Governor and Company of the Bank of England to amend the Llanelly Harbour Act 1904 (Note: Llanelly Harbour Act 1904 (4 Edw. 7. c. cvi)) and for other purposes.

=== Private and personal acts ===
Short title	Citation	Royal assent
Long title
Warden's Divorce Act 1910 (Note: This act was not printed by the King's Printer)	10 Edw. 7 & 1 Geo. 5. c. 1 Pr.	26 July 1910
An Act to dissolve the marriage of Isabella Caroline Annie Warden of the Red House Maynooth in the county of Kildare with Kenneth Evers Warden her husband and to enable her to marry again and for other purposes.

=== Sources ===
- The Public General Statutes. 1910. pp. 1–214 – via Google Books.
- 10 Edward VII & 1 George V - 1910 – via HathiTrust.

== See also ==
- List of acts of the Parliament of the United Kingdom
