= Police Pensions Act 1921 =

Act of the Parliament of the United Kingdom

Police Pensions Act 1921 (Note: Section 35(1).)
- Act of Parliament
- Parliament of the United Kingdom
- Long title: An Act to consolidate and amend the law respecting the Retirement, Pensions, Allowances, and Gratuities of Members of Police Forces in Great Britain, and their Widows, Children, and Dependants.
- Citation: 11 & 12 Geo. 5. c. 31
- Territorial extent: England and Wales; Scotland; (Note: Section 34(2).)

Dates
- Royal assent: 28 July 1921
- Commencement: 28 August 1921 (Note: Section 35(2).)
Other legislation
Amends	See § Repealed enactments
Repeals/revokes	See § Repealed enactments
Amended by	Police Pensions Act 1948; National Assistance Act 1948; Justices of the Peace Act 1949; Police Act 1964; Superannuation (Miscellaneous Provisions) Act 1967; Police (Scotland) Act 1967; Pensions (Increase) Act 1971

Status: Partially repealed

Text of statute as originally enacted

The Police Pensions Act 1921 (11 & 12 Geo. 5. c. 31) is an act of the Parliament of the United Kingdom that consolidated and amended enactments relating to the retirement, pensions, allowances, and gratuities of members of police forces in Great Britain, and their widows, children, and dependants.

== Provisions ==
=== Repealed enactments ===
Section 35(3) of the act repealed 15 enactments, listed in the fourth schedule to the act.

Citation	Short title	Description	Extent of repeal
2 & 3 Vict. c. xciv	City of London Police Act 1839	An Act for regulating the Police in the City of London.	Sections 11 and 12; in section 13 the words "any wounds or injuries received, or ;"; section 87.
37 Vict. c. xciv	City of London Police Act 1874	The City of London Police Act, 1874.	The whole act.
52 & 53 Vict. c. cxxvii	City of London Police Superannuation Act 1889	The City of London Police Superannuation Act, 1889.	Sections 2 to 8; section 10; sections 13 and 14.
53 & 54 Vict. c. 45	Police Act 1890	The Police Act, 1890.	Sections 1 to 22 (inclusive), 30 to 32 (inclusive), 35 and 36, and the First Schedule.
53 & 54 Vict. c. 67	Police (Scotland) Act 1890	The Police (Scotland) Act, 1890.	Sections 1, 2, 4 to 24 (inclusive), 25 (1) and (2), 27 to 29 (inclusive), 31 and 32, and the First Schedule.
56 Vict. c. 10	Police Act 1893	The Police Act, 1893.	Section 1, section 2 (3), and sections 3 to 8 inclusive.
57 & 58 Vict. c. vii	City of London Police Superannuation Act 1894	The City of London Police Superannuation Act, 1894.	The whole act.
6 Edw. 7. c. 7	Police (Superannuation) Act 1906	The Police (Superannuation) Act, 1906.	The whole act.
8 Edw. 7. c. 5	Police (Superannuation) Act 1908	The Police (Superannuation) Act, 1908.	The whole act.
9 Edw. 7. c. 40	Police Act 1909	The Police Act, 1909.	Section 5.
10 Edw. 7. & 1 Geo. 5. c. 10	Police (Scotland) Act (1890) Amendment Act 1910	The Police (Scotland) Act, 1890 (Amendment) Act, 1910.	The whole act.
1 & 2 Geo. 5. c. lxxxiv	City of London (Various Powers) Act 1911	The City of London (Various Powers) Act, 1911.	Section 25.
8 & 9 Geo. 5. c. 51	Police (Pensions) Act 1918	The Police (Pensions) Act, 1918.	Sections 1, 2, 3, and 5.
9 & 10 Geo. 5. c. 46	Police Act 1919	The Police Act, 1919.	Section 6 and section 13 (3).
10 & 11 Geo. 5. c. xxvii	City of London (Various Powers) Act 1920	The City of London (Various Powers) Act, 1920.	Section 11.
