= Police Act 1909 =

Act of the Parliament of the United Kingdom

Police Act 1909 (Note: Section 6.)
- Act of Parliament
- Parliament of the United Kingdom
- Long title: An Act to amend the Metropolitan Police Acts 1829 to 1899, and to make better provision for the widows and children of constables who lose their lives in the execution of their duty.
- Citation: 9 Edw. 7. c. 40
- Territorial extent: United Kingdom

Dates
- Royal assent: 25 November 1909
- Commencement: 25 November 1909 (Note: The Acts of Parliament (Commencement) Act 1793.)

Other legislation
- Amends: Police Act 1890; Police (Scotland) Act 1890; Metropolitan Police Courts Act 1897
- Amended by: Police Pensions Act 1921; Local Government Act 1948; Statute Law Revision Act 1950; Superannuation (Miscellaneous Provisions) Act 1967; Statute Law (Repeals) Act 1993; Greater London Authority Act 1999

Status: Partially repealed

Text of statute as originally enacted

Revised text of statute as amended

Text of the Police Act 1909 as in force today (including any amendments) within the United Kingdom, from legislation.gov.uk.

The Police Act 1909 (9 Edw. 7. c. 40) is an act of the Parliament of the United Kingdom, granted royal assent on 25 November 1909. Despite its short title, it applied solely to the Metropolitan Police and is most notable for adding a fourth Assistant Commissioner (Section 3) and in the aftermath of a married Met PC's death in the Tottenham Outrage earlier that year increased pensions and allowances to widows and children of officers killed on duty (Section 5).

== Subsequent developments ==
Section 123(2) of the act was repealed for England by section 1(1) of, and the first schedule to, the Statute Law Revision Act 1950 (14 Geo. 6. c. 6), which came into force on 23 May 1950.
