= Police Act 1958 =

Act of Parliament in New Zealand

New Zealand Parliament
- Long title: An Act to consolidate and amend the law relating to the establishment and regulation of the Police of New Zealand
- Enacted: 1958
- Repealed: 1 October 2008

Repealed by
- Policing Act 2008

Summary
- New Zealand Police
- Status: Repealed

The Police Act 1958 legislated the functions, governance and administration of the New Zealand Police. It repealed the Police Force Act 1947 and was in force from 1958 to 2008.

The Act removed the word 'Force' from the name of New Zealand Police. It is said the change was to better reflect its operating practices and philosophy. The Act established the office of Deputy Commissioner which had not existed prior to the Act.

In 1992 the Traffic Service of the Ministry of Transport was merged into New Zealand Police, this prompted new regulations made under the Act and a review into the structure of New Zealand Police.

In 2000 it was alleged that the Commissioner of Police Peter Doone had prevented the breath testing of his partner Robyn when stopped for driving without lights on at 11pm. The Minister of Police George Hawkins was told that Act needed further clarification with to respect of the role of the Commissioner and the removal of the Commissioner from office. Helen Clark was informed that it would be difficult to remove Doone because he was not subject to disciplinary proceedings under the Police Act.

In later years the Act was criticized for being out of date with modern policing standards and human resource practice. In March 2006, Minister of Police Annette King announced the Act would be reviewed citing a number of issues that would be reviewed including the principles of policing, governance arrangements and human resource management. It was replaced by the Policing Act 2008.
