= Police Act 1893 =

Act of the Parliament of the United Kingdom

Police Act 1893 (Note: Section 9.)
- Act of Parliament
- Parliament of the United Kingdom
- Long title: An Act to amend the Police Acts.
- Citation: 56 & 57 Vict. c. 10
- Territorial extent: United Kingdom

Dates
- Royal assent: 9 June 1893
- Commencement: 9 June 1893 (Note: The Acts of Parliament (Commencement) Act 1793.)
- Repealed: 23 May 1950
Other legislation
Amends	Town Police Clauses Act 1847; Police Act 1890
Repealed by	Police Pensions Act 1921; Fire Brigades Act 1938; Statute Law Revision Act 1950

Status: Repealed

Text of statute as originally enacted

The Police Act 1893 (56 & 57 Vict. c. 10) was an act of the Parliament of the United Kingdom. It clarified the Police Act 1890 (53 & 54 Vict. c. 45) by stating that time spent by an officer acting as a fireman or extinguishing a fire was to be accounted as time spent "in the execution of his duty" and enabled watch committees to use police officers full- or part-time as firemen, with their pay, pensions and gratuities funded from the usual police, "fire police" or "fire brigade" sources. It also enabled police authorities to increase an ex-officer's injury pension in the first three years after it was first granted if a medical assessment proved the ex-officer's level of disability had increased from partial to total.

== Subsequent developments ==
The whole act, so far as unrepealed, was repealed by section 1(1) of, and the first schedule to, the Statute Law Revision Act 1950 (14 Geo. 6. c. 6), which came into force on 23 May 1950.
