= Police Act 1890 =

Act of the Parliament of the United Kingdom

Police Act 1890 (Note: Section 38(1).)
- Act of Parliament
- Parliament of the United Kingdom
- Long title: An Act to make provision respecting the Pensions, Allowances, and Gratuities of Police Constables in England and Wales, and their Widows and Children, and to make other provisions respecting the Police of England and Wales.
- Citation: 53 & 54 Vict. c. 45
- Territorial extent: England and Wales (Note: Sections 39 and 40.)

Dates
- Royal assent: 14 August 1890
- Commencement: 1 April 1891 (Note: Section 37.)
- Repealed: 1 August 1964 (Note: The Police Act 1964 (Commencement No. 1) Order 1964 (SI 1964/873).)
Other legislation
Amends	Metropolitan Police Act 1829; Metropolitan Police Act 1839; Metropolitan Police Act 1857; Metropolitan Police (Receiver) Act 1861
Amended by	Police Act 1893; Police (Superannuation) Act 1906; Police Act 1909; Police Pensions Act 1921
Repealed by	Police Act 1964
Relates to	Police (Scotland) Act 1890

Status: Repealed

Text of statute as originally enacted

Police (Scotland) Act 1890 (Note: Section 34.)
- Act of Parliament
- Parliament of the United Kingdom
- Long title: An Act to make provision respecting the Pensions, Allowances, and Gratuities of Police Constables in Scotland, and their Widows and Children, and to make other provisions respecting the Police of Scotland.
- Citation: 53 & 54 Vict. c. 67
- Territorial extent: Scotland (Note: Section 35.)

Dates
- Royal assent: 18 August 1890
- Commencement: 1 April 1891 (Note: Section 33.)
- Repealed: 1 January 1957
Other legislation
Amended by	Police Act 1909; Police (Scotland) Act (1890) Amendment Act 1910; Police Pensions Act 1921
Repealed by	Police (Scotland) Act 1956

Status: Repealed

Text of statute as originally enacted

The Police Act 1890 (53 & 54 Vict. c. 45) was an act of the Parliament of the United Kingdom setting up a system of police pensions.

A similar system for Scottish forces was established by the Police (Scotland) Act 1890 (Note: Its full title was An Act to make provision respecting the Pensions, Allowances, and Gratuities of Police Constables in Scotland, and their Widows and Children, and to make other provisions respecting the Police of Scotland.) (Note: Granted royal assent on 18 August 1890.) (53 & 54 Vict. c. 67).

Only a system of discretionary pensions for injury had previously existed. The acts set a requirement of at least 25 years' service, reduced to 15 (England and Wales) or 20 (Scotland) years for retirement due to "infirmity of mind or body" and waived for retirement due to injury in the line of duty. They also established discretionary gratuities for retirement due to infirmity.

They also covered widows' pensions and children's allowances for officers dying whilst still in service "from the effect of an injury received in the execution of his duty". It also instituted similar widows' and children's allowances if an officer died from any other cause whilst still in service and widows' and children's pensions and gratuities if he died less than a year after retiring due to injury, though unlike the pensions for injury these were all at the discretion of individual police forces.

== Subsequent developments ==
The whole act was repealed by section 64(3) of, and part I of schedule 10 to, the Police Act 1964, which came into force on 1 August 1964.
