= Anglian Water Authority =

British regional water authority

- Successor: Anglian Water (privatised)
- Founded: 1974
- Dissolved: 1989
- Type: Regional water authority
- Purpose: Water
- Location: Huntingdon, United Kingdom
- Region served: East Anglia
- Products: Drinking water, wastewater treatment
- Owner: UK Government

The Anglian Water Authority was a British regional water authority that served the East Anglia region. It was formed in 1974 by virtue of the Water Act 1973 as one of the regional water authorities.

It established its headquarters in Huntingdon in Cambridgeshire. The authority boundary was the pre-existing boundaries of the constituent river authorities whose total area made Anglian Water Authority the largest of the ten newly created Authorities. It was privatised in 1989, to create Anglian Water which took over many of its assets and responsibilities, the remainder being vested in the Environment Agency.

== History ==
=== Foundation through merger ===
Anglian Water Authority was created in 1974 by virtue of the Water Act 1973. It subsumed the roles and responsibilities of:

- East Suffolk and Norfolk River Authority
- Essex River Authority (Note: Except the part of the area of the Essex River Authority which was included in the area of the Thames Water Authority.)
- Great Ouse River Authority
- Lincolnshire River Authority
- Welland and Nene River Authority

It also took over sewage treatment and sewerage responsibilities of all the local authorities in the area with the exception of:

- Dunstable
- Gainsborough
- Glanford Brigg
- Houghton Regis
- Thurrock

It also took over the water supply functions previously exercised by the following:

- Ipswich Corporation Waterworks
- Buckingham Corporation Waterworks
- Norwich Corporation Waterworks
- Bedfordshire Water Board
- Bucks Water Board
- Colchester and District Water Board
- East Lincolnshire Water Board
- Ely, Mildenhall and Newmarket Water Board
- Higham Ferrers and Rushden Water Board
- Kesteven Water Board
- Lincoln and District Water Board
- Mid-Northamptonshire Water Board
- Nene and Ouse Water Board
- North East Lincolnshire Water Board
- North Lindsey Water Board
- North-West Norfolk Water Board
- South Lincolnshire Water Board
- South Norfolk Water Board
- West Suffolk Water Board
- Wisbech and District Water Board

Four private statutory water companies operated in the area of the water authority. In their supply areas, Anglian Water Authority provided sewage services only.

- Cambridge Water Company
- East Anglian Water Company
- Essex Water Company
- Tendring Hundred Waterworks Company

==== Predecessors ====
===== Ipswich Corporation Waterworks =====
Ipswich Corporation Waterworks was established in 1892, taking over the existing private Ipswich Water Works Company by the Ipswich Corporation (Purchase of Water Works) Act 1892 (55 & 56 Vict. c. xciv).

The Ipswich Water Works Company had been founded in 1852, and gained statutory authority under the Ipswich Waterworks Act 1857 (20 & 21 Vict. c. xlvii).

The Felixstowe and Walton Waterworks Company was incorporated by the Felixstowe and Walton Waterworks Act 1895 (58 & 59 Vict. c. xiii). The Felixstowe and District Water Act 1931 (21 & 22 Geo. 5. c. cv) renamed the company the Felixstowe and District Water Company. The company was absorbed into Ipswich Corporation Waterworks by the Ipswich Water (Felixstowe and District) Order 1967 (SI 1967/530).

===== Norwich Corporation Waterworks =====
The Norwich Corporation Waterworks was established when the Norwich Corporation Act 1920 (10 & 11 Geo. 5. c. xcv) transferred the undertaking of the private City of Norwich Waterworks Company to Norwich Corporation.

The City of Norwich Waterworks Company had been founded by the City of Norwich Waterworks Act 1850 (13 & 14 Vict. c. lii).

===== Bedfordshire Water Board =====
The Bedfordshire Water Board was constituted by the Bedfordshire Water Board Order 1960 (SI 1960/1473).

===== Bucks Water Board =====
The Bucks Water Board was formed by the Bucks Water Act 1937 (1 Edw. 8 & 1 Geo. 6. c. xcv) from the water undertakings of the rural district councils of Aylesbury, Buckingham Wing and Winslow.

The Bucks Water Board Act 1946 (9 & 10 Geo. 6. c. xx) transferred the undertaking of the Chiltern Hills Spring Water Company into the Bucks Water Board.

The Bucks Water Board Act 1959 (7 & 8 Eliz. 2. c. xxxii) added the Brackley Corporation Waterworks, High Wycombe Corporation Waterworks, the Marlow Water Company, and the water undertakings of Bletchley Urban District Council, Newport Pagnell Urban District Council, Towcester Urban District Council, and Wycombe Urban District Council.

The Chiltern Hills Spring Water Company was incorporated by the Chiltern Hills Spring Water Act 1870 (33 & 34 Vict. c. xxv).

The High Wycombe Waterworks, Baths, and Wash-houses Company was authorised to supply water by the High Wycombe Water Order 1874.

The Marlow Water Company was incorporated by the Marlow Water Act 1935 (25 & 26 Geo. 5. c. xxiv), and took over the earlier Great Marlow Water Company.

The Great Marlow Water Company Limited was authorised to supply water by the Marlow Water Order 1889.

===== Colchester and District Water Board =====
The Colchester and District Water Board was formed by the Colchester and District Water Board Order 1960 (SI 1960/1187), from the Colchester Corporation Waterworks, and the water undertakings of the surrounding rural district councils.

The Company of Proprietors of the Colchester Waterworks was incorporated by the Colchester Water Act 1808 (48 Geo. 3. c. cxxxvii). It was dissolved and reincorporated as the Colchester Waterworks Company by the Colchester Waterworks Act 1879 (42 & 43 Vict. c. cxxi). The waterworks were purchased by Colchester Corporation in 1880, and became Colchester Corporation Waterworks.

===== East Lincolnshire Water Board =====
The East Lincolnshire Water Board was created by the East Lincolnshire Water Board Order 1963 (SI 1963/1159).

===== Ely, Mildenhall and Newmarket Water Board =====
The Ely, Mildenhall and Newmarket Water Board was established by the Ely, Mildenhall and Newmarket Water Board Order 1962 (SI 1962/503).

===== Higham Ferrers and Rushden Water Board =====
The Higham Ferrers and Rushden Water Board was formed by the Higham Ferrars and Rushden Water Board Act 1902 (2 Edw. 7. c. xii) from the water undertaking of Rushden Urban District Council, to supply water to Higham Ferrers and Rushden.

The Higham Ferrers Water Company was authorised to supply water by the Higham Ferrers Water Act 1900 (63 & 64 Vict. c. xxvii). However, before it was able to proceed with the works, the powers were transferred to the new water board.

===== Kesteven Water Board =====
The Kesteven Water Board was founded by the Kesteven Water Board Order 1961 (SI 1961/2349). It took over the undertaking of Sleaford Urban District Council and the Grantham Waterworks Company. It had offices in Grantham, Lincolnshire.

The Grantham Waterworks Company had been formed by the Grantham Waterworks Act 1873 (36 & 37 Vict. c. iv).

===== Lincoln and District Water Board =====
The Lincoln and District Water Board was created by the Lincoln and District Water Board Order 1961 (SI 1961/441). It took over the Lincoln Corporation Waterworks.

===== Mid-Northamptonshire Water Board =====
The Mid-Northamptonshire Water Board was formed by the Mid-Northamptonshire Water Board Order Confirmation (Special Procedure) Act 1949 (12 & 13 Geo. 6 c. ix), confirming the Mid-Northamptonshire Water Board Order 1948. It was constituted from the Woodford Halse Water Company and part of the distribution network of the Corby (Northants) and District Water Company, as well as the water undertakings of the councils of Daventry, Kettering, Northampton, Burton Latimer, Corby, Desborough, Rothwell, Wellingborough, Brixworth, Market Harborough, and Uppingham.

===== Nene and Ouse Water Board =====
The Nene and Ouse Water Board was formed by the Nene and Ouse Water Board Order 1961 (SI 1961/2328). It absorbed the Peterborough Corporation Waterworks.

===== North East Lincolnshire Water Board =====
The Grimsby Cleethorpes and District Water Board was created by the Grimsby Corporation (Grimsby, Cleethorpes and District Water, &c.) Act 1937 (1 Edw. 8 & 1 Geo. 6. c. xli), taking over the undertaking of the private Great Grimsby Waterworks Company Limited. It had offices in Town Hall Square, Grimsby.

The name was changed to North East Lincolnshire Water Board by the North East Lincolnshire Water Order 1959 (SI 1959/358) with the addition of the undertakings of Caistor Rural District Council and Market Rasen Urban District Council.

The Great Grimsby Waterworks Company Limited had been incorporated in 1862, and authorised under the Great Grimsby Waterworks Act 1863 (26 & 27 Vict. c. xxxv) to supply water to Grimsby and Cleethorpes.

The North East Lincolnshire Water Company was incorporated by the North East Lincolnshire Water Act 1906 (6 Edw. 7. c. xxxvi), replacing the Barton-upon-Humber Water Company Limited, which had been authorised to supply water by the Barton-upon-Humber Water Order 1897, confirmed by the Water Orders Confirmation Act 1897 (60 & 61 Vict. c. clvi).

===== North Lindsey Water Board =====
The North Lindsey Water Board was created by the North Lindsey Water Act 1934 (24 & 25 Geo. 5 c. xci).

===== North-West Norfolk Water Board =====
The North-West Norfolk Water Board was formed by the North-West Norfolk Water Board Order 1969 (SI 1969/104)

===== South Lincolnshire Water Board =====
The South Lincolnshire Water Board was constituted by the South Lincolnshire Water Board Order 1962 (SI 1962/840).

The South Lincolnshire Water Company was incorporated by the South Lincolnshire Water Act 1906 (6 Edw. 7. c. cxcvi).

The Stamford Water Works Company was established by the Stamford Water Act 1837 (7 Will. 4 & 1 Vict. c. xx)

===== South Norfolk Water Board =====
The South Norfolk Water Board was constituted by the South Norfolk Water Board Order 1969 (SI 1969/55).

===== West Suffolk Water Board =====
The West Suffolk Water Board was created by the West Suffolk Water Board Order 1963 (SI 1963/1622).

===== Wisbech and District Water Board =====
The Wisbech and District Water Board was formed by the Wisbech and District Water Board Order 1950 (SI 1950/1533).

It was preceded by the Wisbech Waterworks Company, formed by the Wisbech Waterworks Act 1864 (27 & 28 Vict. c. clxxx).

=== Demise through privatisation ===
In 1989, the privatisation of the water industry in England and Wales saw the creation of Anglian Water who took over the water treatment and supply and sewerage and sewage disposal functions. All the remaining regulatory functions including flood control, water quality management, pollution control and water resource management were transferred to the newly created National Rivers Authority, which was subsequently subsumed into the new Environment Agency in 1996.
