= Ipswich Water Works Company =

- Company type: Private company
- Industry: Water
- Founded: 1857
- Defunct: 1893
- Fate: Merged
- Successor: Ipswich Corporation Waterworks
- Headquarters: Ipswich, United Kingdom
- Area served: Ipswich
- Products: Drinking water, wastewater treatment

The Ipswich Water Works Company was formed following the merger of nine private water companies. In 1854, a proposal by Ipswich Corporation to gain control of the rights to supply water to the town had been met by protests from residents and water suppliers. The company was incorporated and gained statutory authorisation to supply water by the Ipswich Waterworks Act 1857 (20 & 21 Vict. c. xlvii).

The water works was bought by Ipswich Corporation under the Ipswich Corporation (Purchase of Water Works) Act 1892 (55 & 56 Vict. c. xciv), who then turned it into the Ipswich Corporation Waterworks. The Ipswich Water Works Company was wound-up in 1893. In 1972, the Ipswich Corporation Waterworks was merged with other water companies in the region to create the Anglian Water Authority.

== Constituent companies ==
The earlier waterworks operations that were bought out when the IWWC was founded included:

- Ipswich Corporation
  - Stoke Water Works (purchased by Ipswich Corporation in 1853 for £1,100)
- William Charles Fonnereau
- Richard Dykes Alexander
- John Cobbold (St. Clements Water Company)
- John Chevallier Cobbold
- John Orford
- Holywells Water Works Company
- St. Helen's Water Works
- Key Water Works
- Brooks Hall Water Works
- Tovells Spring Water Works

Fonnereau's undertaking was purchased jointly by the remaining four operators, who also jointly purchased Ipswich Corporation's undertaking for £21,500 in October 1854; then proposed to combine into a single company.

== Directors ==
The directors included:

- Richard Dykes Alexander
- John Cobbold
- John Chevallier Cobbold
- John Orford
