= Essex River Boards and Authorities =

Water management authority in Essex, England

The Rivers of the County of Essex, England have been managed and controlled by a number of statutory bodies since 1931. These have variously aimed to ensure the effective drainage of water courses; ascertain accurate flowrates; manage, measure and control pollution; regulate the abstraction and impounding of water; manage the treatment and supply of water; and manage sewage treatment and disposal.

== Background ==
=== Regulation before 1931 ===
Prior to 1931 the legislation on land drainage was piecemeal and comprised mainly local acts. The principal agents for regulating land drainage was the Commissioners of Sewers for Essex together with Sewer Commissioners for various parishes and districts. Although the administrative bodies had sufficient legal powers to manage the drainage of low-lying areas, they did not have sufficient resources to do this effectively. A Royal Commission on land drainage (the Bledisloe Commission, 1927) found the existing legislation to be "vague and ill-defined, full of anomalies, obscure, lacking in uniformity, and even chaotic." The commission's report led to the enactment of the Land Drainage Act 1930 (20 & 21 Geo. 5. c. 44).

=== Essex rivers ===
The major rivers and water courses of Essex are:

- Asheldham brook
- River Beam
- Benfleet Creek
- River Blackwater
- Bourne Brook
- River Braine
- Brook house Brook
- River Cam
- River Can
- River Chelmer
- River Colne
- Cripsey Brook
- River Crouch
- Fobbing Creek
- Goldhanger Creek
- Goresbrook
- Higham Brook
- Holehaven Creek
- Holland Brook
- Ingrebourne
- Layer Brook
- River Lea/Lee
- Little London Brook
- Mardyke
- Mountnessing Road Brook
- River Pant
- Pincey Brook
- Prittle Brook
- Ramsey River
- Rettendon Brook
- Rivenhall Brook
- River Roach
- River Roding
- River Rom
- Roman River
- Roxwell Brook
- Sandon Brook
- Sandy Brook
- Sixpenny/Tenpenny Brooks
- Stock Brook
- River Stort
- River Stour
- River Ter
- River Thames
- Thorndon Brook
- Wantz Stream
- River Wid

== Boards and Authorities ==
=== Essex River Catchment Board ===
The Essex River Catchment Board (1931–1950) was established in 1931 under the provisions of the Land Drainage Act 1930 (20 & 21 Geo. 5. c. 44). The Act provided for new administrative structures to ensure that the drainage of water courses could be effectively managed. The Act established 47 catchment boards with overall responsibility for each main river system in England and Wales. The Essex River Catchment Board included responsibility for the rivers in Essex with the exception of the river Thames, Lea, Roding and Stour (Essex and Suffolk).

From June 1934 the offices of the Board was 'Essex River House' at the junction of Springfield Road and Victoria Road Chelmsford. The chairman at this time was Douglas B Smith JP, Lieut-Col. A J R Waller was chairman up to 1950.

Catchment Board established a number of internal drainage districts in Essex in the 1930s. These were:

- Brooklands Internal Drainage District
- Canvey Island Internal Drainage District
- Chelmer and Blackwater Drainage District
- River Colne Internal Drainage District
- Dengey Internal Drainage District
- Fobbing Internal Drainage District
- Hamford Water Internal Drainage District
- Lower Crouch and Roach Drainage District
- Maldon, Wivenhoe and Clacton Internal Drainage District
- Mundon and Latchingdon Internal Drainage District
- North Fambridge Internal Drainage District
- Pitsea Internal Drainage District
- Rainham Internal Drainage District
- Ramsey River Drainage District
- Ripple Internal Drainage District
- River Stour Internal Drainage District
- River Stour Estuary Drainage District
- Tendering Internal Drainage District
- Upper Crouch Internal Drainage District

The Essex River Catchment Board was abolished in 1950 when responsibility for the Essex Rivers passed to the newly established Essex River Board.

=== Essex River Board ===
The Essex River Board (1950–1965) was established in 1950 under the provisions of the River Board Act 1948 (11 & 12 Geo. 6. c. 32). During the 1930s data on river flow rates and water quality were found to be inadequate. Proposed legislation to address the issue was delayed by the Second World War but was enacted as the River Board Act 1948. The Act transferred the legal powers of the River Catchment Boards to the River Boards. It provided the legal, financial and administrative structures for the river boards, which were responsible for the management of river board areas. The Essex River Board included all the rivers in the Essex River Catchment Board plus the Roding and the Stour (Essex and Suffolk). The River Boards were given further powers to raise drainage charges by virtue of the Land Drainage Act 1961 (c. 48). The chairman of the Board (1958–1963) was Russell H R Davey.

The Essex River Board was abolished in 1965 when responsibility for the Essex Rivers passed to the Essex River Authority.

=== Essex River Authority ===
The Essex River Authority (1965–1974) was established 1965 under the provisions of the Water Resources Act 1963 (c. 38). The Act provided for the establishment of River Authorities (including the Essex River Authority) and an overarching Water Resources Board. The legal powers of the existing river boards and authorities (Essex River Board) were transferred to the new Authorities together with new functions such as controlling the abstraction and impounding of water, and charging for licences for abstraction. It was also responsible for securing the protection and proper use of inland waters and water in underground strata.

The River Authority consisted of not less than 21, nor more than 31 members. There was at least one member qualified in each of: land drainage; fisheries; agriculture; public water supply; and industry. The remainder were appointed by local authorities.

The Essex River Authority’s area of interest covered 1,620 square miles. It comprised 460 miles of rivers, brooks and creeks; of which there were 372 miles of non-tidal brooks and rivers, and 88 miles of tidal rivers and creeks.

The Essex River Authority obtained further powers by virtue of the Essex River and South Essex Water Act 1969 (Ch. xlix). These included works to enable the South Essex Waterworks Company to abstract water from the River Stour.

The Essex River Catchment Board and its predecessors had established a number of internal drainage districts in the 1920s and 1930, see above. By 1972 the Essex River Authority found these districts were impairing its efficient operation and obtained the Essex River Authority Act 1972 (c. 39) which abolished the drainage districts. The Essex River Authority was itself abolished in 1974 when the Anglian Water Authority was established.

The only chairman (1964–1974) of the Water Resources Board was Sir William Allmond Codrington Goode.

=== Anglian Water Authority ===
The Anglian Water Authority (1974–1989) was formed in 1974 under the provisions of the Water Act 1973 (c. 37) as one of the regional water authorities. The Act made provision for a national policy for water and for managing sewerage and sewage disposal, for fisheries and land drainage, and for recreation and amenity. The authority boundary was the pre-existing boundaries of the constituent river authorities (East Suffolk and Norfolk, Essex, Great Ouse, Lincolnshire and Welland and Nene River Authorities) whose total area made the Anglian Water Authority the largest of the ten newly created Authorities. It subsumed the roles and responsibilities of the Essex River Authority, except for part of the Authority which was transferred to the Thames Water Authority.

Anglian Water Authority comprised: a chairman appointed by the Minister; two to four members appointed by the Minister with expertise in agriculture, land drainage or fisheries; a specified number of members appointed by the Secretary of State with experience in the functioning of water authorities; a specified number of members appointed by local authorities (which shall be greater than the number of members appointed by the Minister and Secretary of State. The first Chairman was Allan E. Skinner (1974–1978), then Alexander Morrison (1978–1981), and Bernard Henderson (1981–1989). As constituted in 1973 the Authority comprised the chairman and 28 members, 14 of which were appointed by local authorities.

The Anglian Water Authority was abolished in 1989 as part of the privatisation of the water industry which established Anglian Water and the National Rivers Authority.

=== Anglian Water ===
Anglian Water (1989–present) was formed in 1989 under the provisions of the Water Act 1989 (c. 15). It assumed responsibility for water treatment and supply, and sewerage and sewage disposal. The majority of Anglian Water branded services and utilities were provided by Anglian Water Services Ltd.

=== National Rivers Authority ===
The National Rivers Authority (1989–1996) was also formed in 1989 under the provisions of the Water Act 1989 (c. 15). It assumed the remaining functions of the Water Authorities including flood control; water quality management; pollution control; and water resource management. The National Rivers Authority was subsumed into the Environment Agency in 1996.

== Timeline ==
A summary timeline of the statutory bodies with responsibilities for managing the Essex rivers is as follows.

| Years | Statutory Body | Principal Legislation |
|---|---|---|
| Before 1931 | Commissioners of Sewers for Essex and local Commissioners | |
| 1931–1950 | Essex River Catchment Board | Land Drainage Act 1930 |
| 1950–1965 | Essex River Board | River Board Act 1948 |
| 1965–1974 | Essex River Authority | Water Resources Act 1963 |
| 1965–1974 | Water Resources Board | Water Resources Act 1963 |
| 1974–1989 | Anglian Water Authority | Water Act 1973 |
| 1989–1996 | National Rivers Authority | Water Act 1989 |
| 1989–present | Anglian Water | Water Act 1989 |

== See also ==
- Land drainage in the United Kingdom
- Land Drainage Act
- Regional water authority
- Anglian Water Authority
