= List of acts of the Parliament of the United Kingdom from 1857 =

This is a complete list of acts of the Parliament of the United Kingdom for the year 1857.

Note that the first parliament of the United Kingdom was held in 1801; parliaments between 1707 and 1800 were either parliaments of Great Britain or of Ireland). For acts passed up until 1707, see the list of acts of the Parliament of England and the list of acts of the Parliament of Scotland. For acts passed from 1707 to 1800, see the list of acts of the Parliament of Great Britain. See also the list of acts of the Parliament of Ireland.

For acts of the devolved parliaments and assemblies in the United Kingdom, see the list of acts of the Scottish Parliament, the list of acts of the Northern Ireland Assembly, and the list of acts and measures of Senedd Cymru; see also the list of acts of the Parliament of Northern Ireland.

The number shown after each act's title is its chapter number. Acts passed before 1963 are cited using this number, preceded by the year(s) of the reign during which the relevant parliamentary session was held; thus the Union with Ireland Act 1800 is cited as "39 & 40 Geo. 3 c. 67", meaning the 67th act passed during the session that started in the 39th year of the reign of George III and which finished in the 40th year of that reign. Note that the modern convention is to use Arabic numerals in citations (thus "41 Geo. 3" rather than "41 Geo. III"). Acts of the last session of the Parliament of Great Britain and the first session of the Parliament of the United Kingdom are both cited as "41 Geo. 3".

Some of these acts have a short title. Some of these acts have never had a short title. Some of these acts have a short title given to them by later acts, such as the Short Titles Act 1896.

== 20 Vict. ==
The fifth session of the 16th Parliament of the United Kingdom, met from 3 February 1857 until 21 March 1857.

=== Public general acts ===
Short title	Citation	Royal assent
Long title
Royal Marines Act 1857 (repealed)	20 Vict. c. 1	9 March 1857
An Act to amend the Act (Note: Royal Marines Act 1847 (10 & 11 Vict. c. 63)) for limiting the Time of Service in the Royal Marine Forces. (Repealed by Regulation of the Forces Act 1881 (44 & 45 Vict. c. 57) and Revision of the Army and Air Force Acts (Transitional Provisions) Act 1955 (3 & 4 Eliz. 2. c. 20))
County Police Act 1857 (repealed)	20 Vict. c. 2	9 March 1857
An Act to facilitate the Appointment of Chief Constables for adjoining Counties, and to confirm Appointments of Chief Constables in certain Cases. (Repealed by Police Act 1964 (c. 48))
Public Health Supplemental Act 1857	20 Vict. c. 3	9 March 1857
An Act to confirm certain Provisional Orders of the General Board of Health applying the Public Health Act, 1848, (Note: Public Health Act 1848 (11 & 12 Vict. c. 63)) to the Districts of Ipswich, Oldbury, Stroud, Llangollen, and Dukinfield; and for altering the Constitution of the Local Board for the Main Sewerage District of Wisbech and Walsoken.
	Provisional Order for the Application of the Public Health Act to the Borough of Ipswich, in the County of Suffolk.	
	Provisional Order for the Application of the Public Health Act to the District of Oldbury, in the County of Worcester.	
	Provisional Order for the Application of the Public Health Act to the Parish of Stroud, in the County of Gloucester.	
	Provisional Order for the Application of the Public Health Act, 1848, to the District of Llangollen, in the County of Denbigh.	
	Provisional Order for the Application of the Public Health Act, 1848, to the District of Dukinfield, in the County of Chester.	
	Provisional Order for altering the Constitution of the Local Board for the Main Sewerage District of Wisbech and Walsoken.	
Grant of Military, etc., Commissions Act 1857 (repealed)	20 Vict. c. 4	9 March 1857
An Act to enable the Subjects of the Ionian States to hold Military and Naval Commissions under the Crown. (Repealed by Ionian States Acts of Parliament Act 1864 (27 & 28 Vict. c. 77))
Annual Inclosure Act 1857 or the Inclosures Pursuant to Report of Inclosure Commissioners Act 1857	20 Vict. c. 5	21 March 1857
An Act to authorize the Inclosure of certain Lands in pursuance of a Report of the Inclosure Commissioners for England and Wales.
Income Tax Act 1857 (repealed)	20 Vict. c. 6	21 March 1857
An Act to reduce the Rates of Duty on Profits arising from Property, Professions, Trades, and Offices. (Repealed by Statute Law Revision Act 1875 (38 & 39 Vict. c. 66))
Indemnity Act 1857 (repealed)	20 Vict. c. 7	21 March 1857
An Act to indemnify such Persons in the United Kingdom as have omitted to qualify themselves for Offices and Employments, and to extend the Time limited for those Purposes respectively. (Repealed by Promissory Oaths Act 1871 (34 & 35 Vict. c. 48))
Copyhold, etc., Commission Act 1857 (repealed)	20 Vict. c. 8	21 March 1857
An Act to continue Appointments under the Act (Note: Inclosure Commissioners Act 1851 (14 & 15 Vict. c. 53)) for consolidating the Copyhold and Inclosure Commissions, and for completing Proceedings under the Tithe Commutation Acts. (Repealed by Statute Law Revision Act 1875 (38 & 39 Vict. c. 66))
Annuity to Right Honourable Charles Shaw Lefevre Act 1857 (repealed)	20 Vict. c. 9	21 March 1857
An Act for settling and securing an Annuity on the Right Honourable Charles Shaw Lefevre, in consideration of his eminent Services. (Repealed by Statute Law Revision (No. 2) Act 1893 (56 & 57 Vict. c. 54))
Ecclesiastical Jurisdiction Act 1857 (repealed)	20 Vict. c. 10	21 March 1857
An Act to continue certain temporary Provisions concerning Ecclesiastical Jurisdiction in England. (Repealed by Statute Law Revision Act 1875 (38 & 39 Vict. c. 66))
Commissioners of Supply (Scotland) Act 1857 (repealed)	20 Vict. c. 11	21 March 1857
An Act to amend the Commissioners of Supply (Scotland) Act, 1856. (Note: Commissioners of Supply (Scotland) Act 1856 (19 & 20 Vict. c. 93)) (Repealed by Local Government (Scotland) Act 1929 (19 & 20 Geo. 5. c. 25))
Lighting of Towns (Ireland) Act 1857 (repealed)	20 Vict. c. 12	21 March 1857
An Act to amend an Act of the Ninth Year of King George the Fourth, Chapter Eighty-two, intituled "An Act to make Provision for the lighting, cleansing, and watching of Cities, Towns Corporate, and Market Towns in Ireland, in certain Cases." (Note: Lighting of Towns (Ireland) Act 1828 (9 Geo. 4. c. 82)) (Repealed by Statute Law Revision Act (Northern Ireland) 1954 (c. 35 (N.I.)))
Mutiny Act 1857 (repealed)	20 Vict. c. 13	21 March 1857
An Act for punishing Mutiny and Desertion, and for the better Payment of the Army and their Quarters. (Repealed by Statute Law Revision Act 1875 (38 & 39 Vict. c. 66))
Marine Mutiny Act 1857 (repealed)	20 Vict. c. 14	21 March 1857
An Act for the Regulation of Her Majesty's Royal Marine Forces while on shore. (Repealed by Statute Law Revision Act 1875 (38 & 39 Vict. c. 66))
Customs Duties Amendment Act 1857 or the Customs Act 1857 (repealed)	20 Vict. c. 15	21 March 1857
An Act for granting certain Duties of Customs on Tea, Sugar, and other Articles (Repealed by Statute Law Revision Act 1875 (38 & 39 Vict. c. 66))
Duty on Racehorses Act 1857 (repealed)	20 Vict. c. 16	21 March 1857
An Act to amend an Act of the last Session of Parliament, (Note: Duty on Racehorses Act 1856 (19 & 20 Vict. c. 82)) for repealing, and re-imposing under new Regulations, the Duty on Race Horses. (Repealed by Customs and Inland Revenue Act 1874 (37 & 38 Vict. c. 16))
Exchequer Bills Act 1857 (repealed)	20 Vict. c. 17	21 March 1857
An Act for raising the Sum of Twenty-one million forty-nine thousand seven hundred Pounds by Exchequer Bills, for the Service of the Year One Thousand eight hundred and fifty-seven. (Repealed by Statute Law Revision Act 1875 (38 & 39 Vict. c. 66))
Poor Act 1857 (repealed)	20 Vict. c. 18	21 March 1857
An Act to continue the Act (Note: Poor Law Union Charges Act 1855 (18 & 19 Vict. c. 47)) for charging the Maintenance of certain Paupers upon the Union Funds. (Repealed by Statute Law Revision Act 1875 (38 & 39 Vict. c. 66))
Extra-Parochial Places Act 1857 (repealed)	20 Vict. c. 19	21 March 1857
An Act to provide for the Relief of the Poor in Extra-parochial Places. (Repealed by Statute Law (Repeals) Act 1974 (c. 22))
Appropriation Act 1857 (repealed)	20 Vict. c. 20	21 March 1857
An Act to apply a Sum out of the Consolidated Fund to the Service of the Year One thousand eight hundred and fifty-seven, and to appropriate the Supplies granted in this Session of Parliament. (Repealed by Statute Law Revision Act 1875 (38 & 39 Vict. c. 66))

=== Local acts ===
Short title	Citation	Royal assent
Long title
Cornwall Railway Act 1857	20 Vict. c. i	21 March 1857
An Act for enabling the Great Western, Bristol and Exeter, and South Devon Railway Companies to afford further Assistance towards the Completion of the Cornwall Railway between Plymouth, and Truro; for extending the Time for the Completion thereof; and for other Purposes.
Price's Patent Candle Company's Act 1857	20 Vict. c. ii	21 March 1857
An Act to re-incorporate Price's Patent Candle Company, Limited, and for other Purposes.
Whitehaven, Cleator and Egremont Railway Act 1857	20 Vict. c. iii	21 March 1857
An Act to enable the Whitehaven, Cleator, and Egremont Railway Company to raise additional Capital; and for other Purposes.

=== Sources ===
- The Statutes of the United Kingdom of Great Britain and Ireland, 20° Victoria, 1857. London: Eyre and Spottiswoode. 1857 – via Internet Archive.
- A Collection of the Public General Statutes, Passed in the Twentieth Year of the Reign of Her Majesty Queen Victoria. London: Eyre and Spottiswoode. 1857 – via Internet Archive.

== 20 & 21 Vict. ==
The first session of the 17th Parliament of the United Kingdom, which met from 30 April 1857 until 28 August 1857.

=== Public general acts ===
Short title	Citation	Royal assent
Long title
Cinque Ports Act 1857 (repealed)	20 & 21 Vict. c. 1	26 June 1857
An Act for the Amendment of the Cinque Ports Act. (Note: Cinque Ports Act 1855 (18 & 19 Vict. c. 48)) (Repealed by Justices of the Peace Act 1949 (12, 13 & 14 Geo. 6. c. 101))
Annuity, Princess Royal Act 1857 (repealed)	20 & 21 Vict. c. 2	26 June 1857
An Act to enable Her Majesty to settle an Annuity on Her Royal Highness the Princess Royal. (Repealed by Statute Law Revision Act 1953 (2 & 3 Eliz. 2. c. 5))
Penal Servitude Act 1857	20 & 21 Vict. c. 3	26 June 1857
An Act to amend the Act of the Sixteenth and Seventeenth Years of Her Majesty, (Note: Penal Servitude Act 1853 (16 & 17 Vict. c. 99)) to substitute in certain Cases other Punishment in lieu of Transportation.
Supply Act 1857 (repealed)	20 & 21 Vict. c. 4	3 July 1857
An Act to apply the Sum of Eight Millions out of the Consolidated Fund to the Service of the Year One thousand eight hundred and fifty-seven. (Repealed by Statute Law Revision Act 1875 (38 & 39 Vict. c. 66))
Income Tax Act 1857 (repealed)	20 & 21 Vict. c. 5	3 July 1857
An Act to continue the Act (Note: Income Tax (Insurance) Act 1853 (16 & 17 Vict. c. 91)) for extending for a limited Time the Provision for Abatement of Income Tax in respect of Insurance on Lives. (Repealed by Statute Law Revision Act 1875 (38 & 39 Vict. c. 66))
Court of Exchequer Chamber (Ireland) Act 1857 (repealed)	20 & 21 Vict. c. 6	3 July 1857
An Act to alter the Constitution and amend the Procedure of the Court of Exchequer Chamber in Ireland. (Repealed by Statute Law Revision Act 1892 (55 & 56 Vict. c. 19))
Grand Jury Cess (Ireland) Act 1857 (repealed)	20 & 21 Vict. c. 7	3 July 1857
An Act to revive and amend certain Acts relating to the Collection of County Cess in Ireland; and also to provide for the Appointment, in certain Cases, of Collectors to levy the Charges and Expenses of additional Constabulary appointed under the Act 19 and 20 Vict. c. 36. (Note: Peace Preservation (Ireland) Act 1856 (19 & 20 Vict. c. 36)) (Repealed by Statute Law Revision Act 1892 (55 & 56 Vict. c. 19), Local Government (Ireland) Act 1898 (61 & 62 Vict. c. 37) and Statute Law Revision Act (Northern Ireland) 1954 (c. 35 (N.I.)))
Ministers Money (Ireland) Act 1857	20 & 21 Vict. c. 8	3 July 1857
An Act to amend the Act 17 & 18 Vict. c. 11., (Note: Church Temporalities Act 1854 (17 & 18 Vict. c. 11)) with a view to the Abolition of Ministers Money in Ireland.
Provisional Order Confirmation (Turnpikes) Act 1857 (repealed)	20 & 21 Vict. c. 9	13 July 1857
An Act to confirm certain Provisional Orders made under an Act of the Fifteenth Year of Her Present Majesty, (Note: Turnpike Trusts (Making of Provisional Orders) Act 1851 (14 & 15 Vict. c. 38)) to facilitate Arrangements for the Relief of Turnpike Trusts. (Repealed by Statute Law (Repeals) Act 1981 (c. 19))
Borough of Hanley Act 1857 (repealed)	20 & 21 Vict. c. 10	13 July 1857
An Act to amend the Charter of Incorporation granted to the Borough of Hanley in the County of Stafford. (Repealed by Statute Law Revision Act 1950 (14 Geo. 6. c. 6))
Militia (Ireland) Act 1857 (repealed)	20 & 21 Vict. c. 11	13 July 1857
An Act to amend "The Militia (Ireland) Act, 1854." (Note: Militia (Ireland) Act 1854 (17 & 18 Vict. c. 107)) (Repealed by Territorial Army and Militia Act 1921 (11 & 12 Geo. 5. c. 37))
Sound Dues Redemption Act 1857 (repealed)	20 & 21 Vict. c. 12	13 July 1857
An Act to carry into effect a Convention between Her Majesty and the King of Denmark. (Repealed by Statute Law Revision Act 1875 (38 & 39 Vict. c. 66))
Workhouse Sites Act 1857 (repealed)	20 & 21 Vict. c. 13	13 July 1857
An Act to facilitate the procuring of Sites for Workhouses in certain Cases. (Repealed by National Assistance Act 1948 (11 & 12 Geo. 6. c. 29))
Joint Stock Companies Act 1857 (repealed)	20 & 21 Vict. c. 14	13 July 1857
An Act to amend the Joint Stock Companies Act, 1856. (Note: Joint Stock Companies Act 1856 (19 & 20 Vict. c. 47)) (Repealed by Companies Act 1862 (25 & 26 Vict. c. 89))
Grand Jury (Ireland) Act 1857 (repealed)	20 & 21 Vict. c. 15	27 July 1857
An Act to amend the Act of the Sixth and Seventh Tears of King William the Fourth, Chapter One hundred and sixteen, (Note: Grand Jury (Ireland) Act 1836 (6 & 7 Will. 4. c. 116)) for consolidating and amending the Laws relating to the Presentment of Public Money by Grand Juries in Ireland. (Repealed by Local Government (Ireland) Act 1898 (61 & 62 Vict. c. 37))
Turnpikes Abolition Act (Ireland) 1857 or the Turnpikes Abolition (Ireland) Act 1857 or the Turnpike Trusts Abolition (Ireland) Act 1857 (repealed)	20 & 21 Vict. c. 16	27 July 1857
An Act to discontinue the Toll on the Turnpike Roads now existing in Ireland, and to provide for the Maintenance of such Roads as public Roads, and for the Discharge of the Debts due thereon, and for other Purposes relating thereto. (Repealed by Statute Law Revision Act 1875 (38 & 39 Vict. c. 66))
Constabulary (Ireland) Act 1857 (repealed)	20 & 21 Vict. c. 17	27 July 1857
An Act to amend the Act of the Eleventh and Twelfth Years of Her Majesty, Chapter Seventy-two, (Note: Constabulary (Ireland) Act 1848 (11 & 12 Vict. c. 72)) so far as relates to the Distribution of the Constabulary Force in Ireland. (Repealed by Statute Law Revision Act 1892 (55 & 56 Vict. c. 19))
Bill Chamber Procedure Act 1857 (repealed)	20 & 21 Vict. c. 18	10 August 1857
An Act to regulate Procedure in the Bill Chamber in Scotland. (Repealed by Court of Session Act 1988 (c. 36))
Bankruptcy and Real Securities (Scotland) Act 1857 (repealed)	20 & 21 Vict. c. 19	10 August 1857
An Act to remove Doubts as to the Law of Bankruptcy and Real Securities in Scotland. (Repealed by Bankruptcy (Scotland) Act 1913 (3 & 4 Geo. 5. c. 20))
Second Annual Inclosure Act 1857 or the Inclosures Act 1857	20 & 21 Vict. c. 20	10 August 1857
An Act to authorize the Inclosure of certain Lands in pursuance of a Special Report of the Inclosure Commissioners for England and Wales.
Militia Ballots Suspension Act 1857 (repealed)	20 & 21 Vict. c. 21	10 August 1857
An Act to suspend the making of Lists and the Ballots for the Militia of the United Kingdom. (Repealed by Statute Law Revision Act 1875 (38 & 39 Vict. c. 66))
Public Health Supplemental Act for Aldershot 1857	20 & 21 Vict. c. 22	10 August 1857
An Act to apply the Public Health Act, 1848, (Note: Public Health Act 1848 (11 & 12 Vict. c. 63)) to the Parish of Aldershot, and to constitute a Local Board of Health therein.
Public Works (Ireland) Act 1857 (repealed)	20 & 21 Vict. c. 23	10 August 1857
An Act to authorize the Commissioners of Public Works in Ireland to sell Mill Sites and Water Power, notwithstanding Final Award, in any Drainage or Navigation District. (Repealed by Erne Drainage and Development Act (Northern Ireland) 1950 (c. 15 (N.I.)) (Note: Incorrectly cited as "1950 c 18" in the Chronological Table of the Statutes.))
Annual Turnpike Acts Continuance Act 1857 or the Turnpike Acts Continuance Act 1857 (repealed)	20 & 21 Vict. c. 24	10 August 1857
An Act to continue certain Turnpike Acts in Great Britain. (Repealed by Statute Law Revision Act 1875 (38 & 39 Vict. c. 66))
Oxford University Act 1857	20 & 21 Vict. c. 25	10 August 1857
An Act to continue the Powers of the Commissioners under an Act of the Seventeenth and Eighteenth years of Her Majesty (Note: Oxford University Act 1854 (17 & 18 Vict. c. 81)) concerning the University of Oxford and the College of St. Mary Winchester, and further to amend the said Act.
Registration of Leases (Scotland) Act 1857	20 & 21 Vict. c. 26	10 August 1857
An Act to provide for the Registration of Long Leases in Scotland, and Assignations thereof.
Caledonian Canal Act 1857	20 & 21 Vict. c. 27	10 August 1857
An Act to amend the Acts relating to the Caledonian and Crinan Canals, and to make further Provision for the Accommodation of the Traffic thereon.
Land and Assessed Taxes (Scotland) Act 1857 (repealed)	20 & 21 Vict. c. 28	10 August 1857
An Act to amend the Laws relating to the Payment of the Land and Assessed Taxes and Property and Income Tax in Scotland. (Repealed by Statute Law Revision Act 1875 (38 & 39 Vict. c. 66) and Taxes Management Act 1880 (43 & 44 Vict. c. 19))
Confirmation of Marriages Act 1857 (repealed)	20 & 21 Vict. c. 29	10 August 1857
An Act to render valid certain Marriages in Christ Church, West Hartlepool, in the Parish of Stranton in the County of Durham. (Repealed by Statute Law (Repeals) Act 1977 (c. 18))
Chatham Lands Purchase Act 1857	20 & 21 Vict. c. 30	10 August 1857
An Act for enabling the Commissioners of the Admiralty to purchase certain Lands in the Parish of Chatham in the County of Kent, and to stop up, divert, or alter certain Ways in the said Parish; and for other Purposes relating thereto.
Inclosure Act 1857	20 & 21 Vict. c. 31	10 August 1857
An Act to amend and explain the Inclosure Acts.
Portland Harbour Waterworks Act 1857	20 & 21 Vict. c. 32	10 August 1857
An Act for the better Supply of Water for the Use of Vessels resorting to the Harbour of Refuge at Portland, and for enabling the Commissioners of the Admiralty to supply such Water; for vesting in the said Commissioners certain Lands belonging to Her Majesty; and for other Purposes relating thereto.
Representative Peers (Ireland) Act 1857 (repealed)	20 & 21 Vict. c. 33	10 August 1857
An Act to regulate certain Proceedings in relation to the Election of Representative Peers for Ireland. (Repealed by Statute Law (Repeals) Act 1971 (c. 52))
New Brunswick Boundary Act 1857 (repealed)	20 & 21 Vict. c. 34	10 August 1857
An Act to explain an Act (Note: New Brunswick Boundary Act 1851 (14 & 15 Vict. c. 63)) for the Settlement of the Boundaries between the Provinces of Canada and New Brunswick. (Repealed by Statute Law Revision Act 1960 (8 & 9 Eliz. 2. c. 56))
City of London Burial Act 1857 (repealed)	20 & 21 Vict. c. 35	10 August 1857
An Act to amend an Act passed in the Fifteenth and Sixteenth Years of the Reign of Her present Majesty Queen Victoria, intituled "An Act to amend the Laws concerning the Burial of the Dead in the Metropolis," (Note: Burial Act 1852 (15 & 16 Vict. c. 85)) so far as relates to the City of London and the Liberties thereof. (Repealed by London Government Act 1963 (c. 33))
County Courts Act 1857 (repealed)	20 & 21 Vict. c. 36	17 August 1857
An Act to supply an Omission in a Schedule to the Act (Note: County Courts Act 1856 (19 & 20 Vict. c. 108)) to amend the Acts relating to County Courts. (Repealed by County Courts Act 1888 (51 & 52 Vict. c. 43))
Civil Service Superannuation Act 1857 (repealed)	20 & 21 Vict. c. 37	17 August 1857
An Act to repeal the Twenty-seventh Section of the Superannuation Act, 1834. (Note: Superannuation Act 1834 (4 & 5 Will. 4. c. 24)) (Repealed by Statute Law Revision Act 1875 (38 & 39 Vict. c. 66))
General Board of Health Act 1857 (repealed)	20 & 21 Vict. c. 38	17 August 1857
An Act to continue the General Board of Health. (Repealed by Statute Law Revision Act 1875 (38 & 39 Vict. c. 66))
Colonial Attorneys Relief Act 1857 or the Colonial Attornies Relief Act 1857 (repealed)	20 & 21 Vict. c. 39	17 August 1857
An Act to regulate the Admission of Attornies and Solicitors of Colonial Courts in Her Majesty's Superior Courts of Law and Equity in England in certain Cases. (Repealed by Colonial Solicitors Act 1900 (63 & 64 Vict. c. 14))
Illicit Distillation (Ireland) Act 1857 (repealed)	20 & 21 Vict. c. 40	17 August 1857
An Act to continue and amend an Act of the Seventeenth and Eighteenth Years of Her Majesty's Reign, Chapter Eighty-nine, (Note: Spirits (Ireland) Act 1854 (17 & 18 Vict. c. 89)) and also the Laws for the Suppression and Prevention of Illicit Distillation in Ireland; and to constitute the Constabulary Force Officers of Customs for certain Purposes. (Repealed by Statute Law (Repeals) Act 1977 (c. 18))
Loan Societies Act 1857 (repealed)	20 & 21 Vict. c. 41	17 August 1857
An Act to revive and continue an Act (Note: Loan Societies Act 1840 (3 & 4 Vict. c. 110)) to amend the Laws relating to Loan Societies. (Repealed by Statute Law Revision Act 1875 (38 & 39 Vict. c. 66))
Burial Grounds (Scotland) Act 1857 (repealed)	20 & 21 Vict. c. 42	17 August 1857
An Act to amend "The Burial Grounds (Scotland) Act, 1855." (Note: Burial Grounds (Scotland) Act 1855 (18 & 19 Vict. c. 68)) (Repealed by Statute Law Revision Act 1875 (38 & 39 Vict. c. 66) and Local Government (Scotland) Act 1947 (10 & 11 Geo. 6. c. 43))
Summary Jurisdiction Act 1857 (repealed)	20 & 21 Vict. c. 43	17 August 1857
An Act to improve the Administration of the Law so far as respects summary Proceedings before Justices of the Peace. (Repealed by Statute Law (Repeals) Act 1993 (c. 50))
Crown Suits (Scotland) Act 1857	20 & 21 Vict. c. 44	17 August 1857
An Act to regulate the Institution of Suits at the Instance of the Crown and the Public Departments in the Courts of Scotland.
Boundary Survey (Ireland) Act 1857	20 & 21 Vict. c. 45	17 August 1857
An Act to make further Provision for defining the Boundaries of certain Denominations of Land in Ireland for public Purposes.
Land Tax Commissioners (Appointment) Act 1857 (repealed)	20 & 21 Vict. c. 46	17 August 1857
An Act to appoint additional Commissioners for executing Acts for granting a Land Tax and other Rates and Dues. (Repealed by Statute Law Revision Act 1950 (14 Geo. 6. c. 6))
Glebe Lands Leasing Powers (Ireland) Act 1857	20 & 21 Vict. c. 47	17 August 1857
An Act to enable Ecclesiastical Persons in Ireland to grant Building Leases of Glebe Lands in certain Cases.
Industrial Schools Act 1857 (repealed)	20 & 21 Vict. c. 48	17 August 1857
An Act to make better Provision for the Care and Education of vagrant, destitute, and disorderly Children, and for Extension of Industrial Schools. (Repealed by Industrial Schools Act 1861 (24 & 25 Vict. c. 113))
Joint Stock Banking Companies Act 1857 or the Joint Banking Companies Act 1857	20 & 21 Vict. c. 49	17 August 1857
An Act to amend the Law relating to Banking Companies.
Municipal Corporations Act 1857 (repealed)	20 & 21 Vict. c. 50	17 August 1857
An Act to amend the Acts concerning Municipal Corporations in England. (Repealed by Municipal Corporations Act 1882 (45 & 46 Vict. c. 50))
New Zealand Loan Guarantee Act 1857 (repealed)	20 & 21 Vict. c. 51	17 August 1857
An Act to guarantee a Loan for the Service of New Zealand. (Repealed by Statute Law Revision Act 1950 (14 Geo. 6. c. 6))
New Zealand Company's Claims Act 1857 (repealed)	20 & 21 Vict. c. 52	17 August 1857
An Act for discharging Claims of the New Zealand Company on the Proceeds of Sales of Waste Lands in New Zealand. (Repealed by Statute Law Revision Act 1892 (55 & 56 Vict. c. 19))
New Zealand Constitution (Amendment) Act 1857 (repealed)	20 & 21 Vict. c. 53	17 August 1857
An Act to amend the Act (Note: New Zealand Constitution Act 1852 (15 & 16 Vict. c. 72)) for granting a Representative Constitution to the Colony of New Zealand. (Repealed by New Zealand Constitution Amendment Act 1947 (11 & 12 Geo. 6. c. 4))
Punishment of Frauds Act 1857 (repealed)	20 & 21 Vict. c. 54	17 August 1857
An Act to make better Provision for the Punishment of Frauds committed by Trustees, Bankers, and other Persons intrusted with Property. (Repealed by Criminal Statutes Repeal Act 1861 (24 & 25 Vict. c. 95))
Reformatory Schools (England) Act 1857 (repealed)	20 & 21 Vict. c. 55	25 August 1857
An Act to promote the Establishment and Extension of Reformatory Schools in England. (Repealed by Reformatory Schools Act 1866 (29 & 30 Vict. c. 117))
Court of Session Act 1857 (repealed)	20 & 21 Vict. c. 56	25 August 1857
An Act to regulate the Distribution of Business in the Court of Session in Scotland. (Repealed by Court of Session Act 1988 (c. 36))
Married Women's Reversionary Interests Act 1857 (repealed)	20 & 21 Vict. c. 57	25 August 1857
An Act to enable Married Women to dispose of Reversionary Interests in Personal Estate. (Repealed for England and Wales by Law of Property (Amendment) Act 1924 (15 & 16 Geo. 5. c. 5), Law of Property Act 1925 (15 & 16 Geo. 5. c. 20) and Statute Law (Repeals) Act 1969 (c. 52) and for Northern Ireland by Statute Law Revision (Northern Ireland) Act 1976 (c. 12))
Lands Valuation (Scotland) Act 1857	20 & 21 Vict. c. 58	25 August 1857
An Act to amend the Act Seventeenth and Eighteenth of Victoria (Note: Lands Valuation (Scotland) Act 1854 (17 & 18 Vict. c. 91)) for the Valuation of Lands in Scotland.
Parochial Schoolmasters (Scotland) Act 1857 (repealed)	20 & 21 Vict. c. 59	25 August 1857
An Act concerning the Parochial Schoolmasters in Scotland. (Repealed by Parochial and Burgh Schoolmasters (Scotland) Act 1861 (24 & 25 Vict. c. 107))
Irish Bankrupt and Insolvent Act 1857 or the Bankrupt and Insolvent Act 1857	20 & 21 Vict. c. 60	25 August 1857
An Act to consolidate and amend the Laws relating to Bankruptcy and Insolvency in Ireland.
Customs and Excise Duties Act 1857 or the Customs and Excise Act 1857 (repealed)	20 & 21 Vict. c. 61	25 August 1857
An Act for granting certain Duties of Customs and Excise. (Repealed by Statute Law Revision Act 1875 (38 & 39 Vict. c. 66))
Customs Amendment Act 1857 or the Customs Act 1857 (repealed)	20 & 21 Vict. c. 62	25 August 1857
An Act for the Alteration and Amendment of the Laws and Duties of Customs. (Repealed by Customs Consolidation Act 1876 (39 & 40 Vict. c. 36))
Dunbar Harbour Loan Act 1857 (repealed)	20 & 21 Vict. c. 63	25 August 1857
An Act to authorize the Advance of Money out of the Consolidated Fund to the Magistrates and Town Council of Dunbar, for the Purpose of improving the Victoria Harbour of Dunbar. (Repealed by Statute Law (Repeals) Act 1976 (c. 16))
Metropolitan Police Act 1857 (repealed)	20 & 21 Vict. c. 64	25 August 1857
An Act for raising a Sum of Money for building and improving Stations of the Metropolitan Police, and to amend the Acts concerning the Metropolitan Police. (Repealed by Metropolitan Police Act 1886 (49 & 50 Vict. c. 22), Statute Law Revision Act 1892 (55 & 56 Vict. c. 19), Police Act 1890 (53 & 54 Vict. c. 45) and Local Government Act 1948 (11 & 12 Geo. 6. c. 26))
Militia Pay Act 1857 (repealed)	20 & 21 Vict. c. 65	25 August 1857
An Act to defray the Charge of the Pay, Clothing, and contingent and other Expenses of the Disembodied Militia in Great Britain and Ireland; to grant Allowances in certain Cases to Subaltern Officers, Adjutants, Paymasters, Quartermasters, Surgeons, Assistant Surgeons, and Surgeons; Mates of the Militia; and to authorize the Employment of the Non-commissioned Officers. (Repealed by Statute Law Revision Act 1875 (38 & 39 Vict. c. 66))
Mutiny, etc., East Indies Act 1857 (repealed)	20 & 21 Vict. c. 66	25 August 1857
An Act for punishing Mutiny and Desertion of Officers and Soldiers in the Service of the East India Company, and for regulating in such Service the Payment of Regimental Debts and the Distribution of the Effects of Officers and Soldiers dying in the Service. (Repealed by Mutiny, East Indies Act 1863 (26 & 27 Vict. c. 48))
Pimlico Improvement Act 1857 (repealed)	20 & 21 Vict. c. 67	25 August 1857
An Act to extend the Time for enabling the Commissioners of Her Majesty's Works to complete Improvements in Pimlico and in the Neighbourhood of Buckingham Palace. (Repealed by Statute Law (Repeals) Act 2013 (c. 2))
Dublin Revising Barristers Act 1857 (repealed)	20 & 21 Vict. c. 68	25 August 1857
An Act to enable the Lord Lieutenant to appoint Revising Barristers for the Revision of Lists and Registry of Voters for the City of Dublin. (Repealed by Statute Law (Repeals) Act 1993 (c. 50))
Appropriation Act 1857 (repealed)	20 & 21 Vict. c. 69	25 August 1857
An Act to apply a Sum out of the Consolidated Fund and the Surplus of Ways and Means to the Service of the Year One thousand eight hundred and fifty-seven, and to appropriate the Supplies granted in this Session of Parliament. (Repealed by Statute Law Revision Act 1875 (38 & 39 Vict. c. 66))
Boundaries of Burghs Extension (Scotland) Act 1857 (repealed)	20 & 21 Vict. c. 70	25 August 1857
An Act to provide for the Extension of the Boundaries of Burghs, in Scotland, and to remove Doubts as to the Right of certain Persons holding Offices to be registered as Votes for Municipal Purposes. (Repealed by Local Government (Scotland) Act 1947 (10 & 11 Geo. 6. c. 43))
Lunacy (Scotland) Act 1857 (repealed)	20 & 21 Vict. c. 71	25 August 1857
An Act for the Regulation of the Care and Treatment of Lunatics, and for the Provision, Maintenance and Regulation of Lunatic Asylums in Scotland. (Repealed by Mental Health (Scotland) Act 1960 (8 & 9 Eliz. 2. c. 61))
Police (Scotland) Act 1857 (repealed)	20 & 21 Vict. c. 72	25 August 1857
An Act to render more effectual the Police in Counties and Burghs in Scotland. (Repealed by Police (Scotland) Act 1956 (4 & 5 Eliz. 2. c. 26))
Smoke Nuisance (Scotland) Act 1857 (repealed)	20 & 21 Vict. c. 73	25 August 1857
An Act for the Abatement of the Nuisance arising from the Smoke of Furnaces in Scotland. (Repealed by Clean Air Act 1956 (4 & 5 Eliz. 2. c. 52))
Episcopal and Capitular Estates Act 1857 (repealed)	20 & 21 Vict. c. 74	25 August 1857
An Act to continue the Act (Note: Episcopal and Capitular Estates Act 1857 (20 & 21 Vict. c. 74)) concerning the Management of Episcopal and Capitular Estates in England. (Repealed by Statute Law Revision Act 1875 (38 & 39 Vict. c. 66))
Jurisdiction in Siam Act 1857 (repealed)	20 & 21 Vict. c. 75	25 August 1857
An Act to confirm an Order in Council concerning the Exercise of Jurisdiction in Matters arising within the Kingdom of Siam. (Repealed by Foreign Jurisdiction Act 1890 (53 & 54 Vict. c. 37))
Roman Catholic Charities Act 1857 (repealed)	20 & 21 Vict. c. 76	25 August 1857
An Act further to continue for a limited Time the Exemption of certain Charities from the Operation of the Charitable Trusts Acts. (Repealed by Statute Law Revision Act 1875 (38 & 39 Vict. c. 66))
Court of Probate Act 1857 (repealed)	20 & 21 Vict. c. 77	25 August 1857
An Act to amend the Law relating to Probates and Letters of Administration in England. (Repealed by Senior Courts Act 1981 (c. 54))
Joint Stock Companies Winding-up Amendment Act 1857 (repealed)	20 & 21 Vict. c. 78	25 August 1857
An Act to amend the Act Seven and Eight Victoria, Chapter One hundred and eleven, (Note: Joint Stock Companies Winding-Up Act 1844 (7 & 8 Vict. c. 111)) for facilitating the winding up the Affairs of Joint Stock Companies unable to meet their pecuniary Engagements, and also the "Joint Stock Companies Winding-up Acts, 1848 (Note: Joint Stock Companies Winding-up Act 1848 (11 & 12 Vict. c. 45)) and 1849." (Note: Joint Stock Companies Act 1849 (12 & 13 Vict. c. 108)) (Repealed by Companies Act 1862 (25 & 26 Vict. c. 89))
Probates and Letters of Administration Act (Ireland) 1857 or the Probates and Letters of Administration (Ireland) Act 1857 (repealed)	20 & 21 Vict. c. 79	25 August 1857
An Act to amend the Law relating to Probates and Letters of Administration in Ireland. (Repealed by Administration of Estates (Northern Ireland) Order 1979 (SI 1979/1575 (N.I. 14)))
Joint Stock Companies Act Amendment Act 1857 or the Joint Stock Companies Act 1856: Amendment Act 1857 (repealed)	20 & 21 Vict. c. 80	25 August 1857
An Act to amend "The Joint Stock Companies Act, 1856." (Repealed by Companies Act 1862 (25 & 26 Vict. c. 89))
Burial Act 1857	20 & 21 Vict. c. 81	25 August 1857
An Act to amend the Burial Acts.
Militia Embodiment Act 1857 (repealed)	20 & 21 Vict. c. 82	25 August 1857
An Act to authorize the Embodying of the Militia. (Repealed by Statute Law Revision Act 1875 (38 & 39 Vict. c. 66))
Obscene Publications Act 1857 or Lord Campbell's Act or Campbell's Act	20 & 21 Vict. c. 83	25 August 1857
An Act for more effectually preventing the Sale of Obscene Books, Pictures, Prints, and other Articles. (Repealed for England and Wales by Obscene Publications Act 1959 (7 & 8 Eliz. 2. c. 66))
Dulwich College Act 1857	20 & 21 Vict. c. 84	25 August 1857
An Act for confirming a Scheme of the Charity Commissioners for the College of God's Gift in Dulwich in the County of Surrey, with certain Alterations.
	Scheme for the Application and Management of the Charity called the College of God's Gift, in Dulwich, in the County of Surrey.	
Matrimonial Causes Act 1857 (repealed)	20 & 21 Vict. c. 85	28 August 1857
An Act to amend the Law relating to Divorce and Matrimonial Causes in England. (Repealed by Administration of Justice Act 1965 (c. 2))

=== Local acts ===
Short title	Citation	Royal assent
Long title
Great Southern and Western Railway (Capital) Act 1857	20 & 21 Vict. c. i	26 June 1857
An Act to enable the Great Southern and Western Railway Company to raise a further Sum of Money.
Chepstow Gas and Coke Consumers Act 1857	20 & 21 Vict. c. ii	26 June 1857
An Act to incorporate a Company for supplying Gas to Chepstow and the Neighbourhood.
Reversionary Interest Society's Act 1857	20 & 21 Vict. c. iii	26 June 1857
An Act for granting further Powers to "the Reversionary Interest Society."
Guildford Water Act 1857	20 & 21 Vict. c. iv	26 June 1857
An Act to incorporate the Proprietors of the Guildford Waterworks; and to confer further Powers for the Supply of Water to the Borough of Guildford.
Inverness and Nairn Railway Act 1857 (repealed)	20 & 21 Vict. c. v	26 June 1857
An Act to amend "The Inverness and Nairn Railway Act, 1854;" (Note: Inverness and Nairn Railway Act 1854 (17 & 18 Vict. c. clxxvi)) to enable the Inverness and Nairn Railway Company to create a Preference Stock, and to raise further Sums of Money; and for other Purposes. (Repealed by Highland Railway Act 1865 (28 & 29 Vict. c. clxviii))
South Shields Gas Act 1857	20 & 21 Vict. c. vi	26 June 1857
An Act for lighting with Gas the Borough of South Shields and Neighbourhood thereof in the County of Durham.
Sunderland Gas Act 1857	20 & 21 Vict. c. vii	26 June 1857
An Act for more effectually supplying with Gas the Town and Borough of Sunderland and the Neighbourhood thereof in the County of Durham.
South Devon Railway Act 1857	20 & 21 Vict. c. viii	26 June 1857
An Act for enabling the South Devon Railway Company to raise additional Capital, and for other Purposes.
Meriton's and Hagen's Sufferance Wharves Act 1857 (repealed)	20 & 21 Vict. c. ix	26 June 1857
An Act for the Regulation of certain Public Sufferance Wharves in the Port of London known as "Meriton's Sufferance Wharf" and "Hagen's Sufferance Wharf." (Repealed by Statute Law (Repeals) Act 1993 (c. 50))
Bedale and Leyburn Railway Act 1857	20 & 21 Vict. c. x	26 June 1857
An Act for regulating the Capital of the Bedale and Leyburn Railway Company, and for other Purposes.
Chester Waterworks Act 1857	20 & 21 Vict. c. xi	26 June 1857
An Act to make further Provision for supplying with Water the City of Chester and Suburbs thereof.
Guildford Gas Act 1857	20 & 21 Vict. c. xii	26 June 1857
An Act to incorporate the Guildford Gaslight and Coke Company, and to confer upon them further Powers for the Supply of Gas to Guildford and the Vicinity.
Great Western and Brentford Railway Amendment Act 1857	20 & 21 Vict. c. xiii	26 June 1857
An Act to enable the Great Western and Brentford Railway Company to raise additional Capital; and for other Purposes.
Peebles Railway Amendment Act 1857	20 & 21 Vict. c. xiv	26 June 1857
An Act to enable the Peebles Railway Company to create additional Shares in their Undertaking; and for other Purposes.
Willenhall Gas Act 1857	20 & 21 Vict. c. xv	26 June 1857
An Act for incorporating the Willenhall Gas Company, and for other Purposes.
Saint Helens Canal and Railway Act 1857 or the St. Helens Canal and Railway Act 1857	20 & 21 Vict. c. xvi	26 June 1857
An Act to authorize the Saint Helens Canal and Railway Company to increase and regulate their Capital, and for other Purposes relating to the Company.
Tralee and Killarney Railway Act 1857	20 & 21 Vict. c. xvii	26 June 1857
An Act to alter the borrowing Powers of the Tralee and Killarney Railway Company.
Portsmouth Railway Amendment Act 1857	20 & 21 Vict. c. xviii	3 July 1857
An Act for enabling the Portsmouth Railway Company to execute certain Works in connexion with their Railway; and for other Purposes.
North-eastern Railway Company's Capital Act 1857 or the North Eastern Railway (Capital) Act 1857	20 & 21 Vict. c. xix	3 July 1857
An Act to enable the North-eastern Railway Company to cancel unissued and forfeited Shares, to create new Shares in lieu thereof, and raise authorized Capital; and for other Purposes.
Dumbarton Waterworks, Reclamation and Municipal Extension Act 1857	20 & 21 Vict. c. xx	3 July 1857
An Act for supplying the Burgh of Dumbarton and Places adjacent with Water; for embanking and reclaiming the Broad Meadow there; and for extending the Municipal Boundaries of the said Burgh.
Islington Parish Act 1857	20 & 21 Vict. c. xxi	3 July 1857
An Act to amend an Act made and passed in the Fifth Year of the Reign of His late Majesty King George the Fourth, intituled "An Act to repeal the several Acts for the Relief and Employment of the Poor of the Parish of Saint Mary Islington in the County of Middlesex; for lighting and watching and preventing Nuisances and Annoyances therein; for amending the Road from Highgate through Maiden Lane, and several other Roads in the said Parish; and for providing a Chapel of Ease and an additional Burial Ground for the same, and to make more effectual Provisions in lieu thereof;" (Note: St. Mary Islington Improvement Act 1824 (5 Geo. 4. c. cxxv)) and for other Purposes.
Brighton, Hove and Preston Constant Service Waterworks Act 1857 (repealed)	20 & 21 Vict. c. xxii	3 July 1857
An Act to grant further Powers to "The Brighton, Hove, and Preston Constant Service Waterworks Company," and to amend the Act (Note: Brighton, Hove and Preston Constant Service Waterworks Act 1854 (17 & 18 Vict. c. v)) relating to the Company. (Repealed by Brighton Corporation Act 1931 (21 & 22 Geo. 5. c. cix))
Calcutta and South-eastern Railway Act 1857 (repealed)	20 & 21 Vict. c. xxiii	3 July 1857
An Act for confofring upon the Calcutta and South-eastern Railway Company certain Powers. (Repealed by Statute Law (Repeals) Act 2013 (c. 2))
Exeter and Exmouth Railway (Extension of Time) Act 1857	20 & 21 Vict. c. xxiv	3 July 1857
An Act to extend the Time for the compulsory Purchase of Lands for Parts of the Exeter and Exmouth Railway.
United General Gaslight Company (Cork) Act 1857 (repealed)	20 & 21 Vict. c. xxv	3 July 1857
An Act for more effectually empowering the United General Gaslight Company to light the City of Cork and the Suburbs thereof with Gas. (Repealed by Cork Gas Act 1868 (31 & 32 Vict. c. xxxii))
Kidsgrove Market Act 1857	20 & 21 Vict. c. xxvi	3 July 1857
An Act to establish Markets and Fairs in the Parish of Kidsgrove in the County of Stafford.
Waterford and Tramore Railway Amendment Act 1857	20 & 21 Vict. c. xxvii	3 July 1857
An Act to amend and extend the Provisions of "The Waterford and Tramore Railway Act, 1851," (Note: Waterford and Tramore Railway Act 1851 (14 & 15 Vict. c. cxii)) to revive and extend their Powers and increase their Capital; and for other Purposes.
Great Yarmouth Britannia Pier Act 1857 (repealed)	20 & 21 Vict. c. xxviii	3 July 1857
An Act for constructing and maintaining a Pier at Great Yarmouth in the County of Norfolk, to be called "The Great Yarmouth Britannia Pier." (Repealed by Great Yarmouth New Britannia Pier Act 1899 (62 & 63 Vict. c. civ))
Dublin and Wicklow Railway Amendment Act 1857	20 & 21 Vict. c. xxix	3 July 1857
An Act to confirm the Incorporation of the Undertaking of the Dublin and Bray Railway Company with that of the Dublin and Wicklow Railway Company, to dissolve the former Company, and to extend the Railway in the City of Dublin.
Bridgwater Markets and Fairs Act 1857	20 & 21 Vict. c. xxx	3 July 1857
An Act for regulating the Markets and Fairs in Bridgwater; and for other Purposes.
Wilmslow and Lawton Road Act 1857 (repealed)	20 & 21 Vict. c. xxxi	13 July 1857
An Act for continuing the Term and amending and extending the Provisions of the Act (Note: Wilmslow Bridge and Church Lawton Road Act 1824 (5 Geo. 4. c. lxxxvii)) relating to the Wilmslow and Lawton Turnpike Road in the County of Chester. (Repealed by Annual Turnpike Acts Continuance Act 1875 (38 & 39 Vict. c. cxciv))
Fraserburgh Harbour Amendment Act 1857 (repealed)	20 & 21 Vict. c. xxxii	13 July 1857
An Act to enable the Fraserburgh Harbour Commissioners to purchase Lands and to borrow a further Sum of Money. (Repealed by Fraserburgh Harbour Act 1878 (41 & 42 Vict. c. cii))
North-eastern Railway Company's (Hartlepool Dock and Railway Amalgamation) Act 1857 or the North Eastern Railway (Hartlepool Dock and Railway Amalgamation) Act 1857	20 & 21 Vict. c. xxxiii	13 July 1857
An Act for amalgamating the Hartlepool Dock and Railway Company with the North-eastern Railway Company, and for vesting the Undertaking of the former Company in that of the latter; and for other Purposes.
Forth and Clyde Junction Railway Amendment Act 1857	20 & 21 Vict. c. xxxiv	13 July 1857
An Act to cancel certain forfeited Shares in the Forth and Clyde Junction Railway Company, and to enable the Company to create new and additional Shares; and for other Purposes.
Glasgow Gaslight Company's Act 1857 (repealed)	20 & 21 Vict. c. xxxv	13 July 1857
An Act for enabling the Glasgow Gaslight Company to raise a further Sum of Money, and for other Purposes. (Repealed by Glasgow Gas Act 1910 (10 Edw. 7 & 1 Geo. 5. c. cxxxi))
St. Philip's Church, Liverpool Act 1857	20 & 21 Vict. c. xxxvi	13 July 1857
An Act for uniting the Offices of Minister and Chaplain of Saint Philip's Church in Liverpool.
Landport and Southsea Improvement Act 1857 (repealed)	20 & 21 Vict. c. xxxvii	13 July 1857
An Act for the Improvement of Landport and Southsea, and the Neighbourhoods, in the Parishes of Portsmouth and Portsea, in the County of Southampton. (Repealed by Portsmouth Corporation Act 1920 (10 & 11 Geo. 5. c. lxviii))
Cardigan Markets and Improvement Act 1857	20 & 21 Vict. c. xxxviii	13 July 1857
An Act to enable the Mayor, Aldermen, and Burgesses of the Borough of Cardigan to provide a Market House, and establish and regulate Markets and Fairs; and to regulate the Supply of Water within the Borough; and to pave, light, cleanse, regulate, and improve the Borough; and for other Purposes.
Wearmouth Bridge Act 1857 (repealed)	20 & 21 Vict. c. xxxix	13 July 1857
An Act to repeal the Provisions of the Acts relating to the Bridge and Ferries across the River Wear in the Borough of Sunderland, and to grant further Powers for the Maintenance and Improvement of such Bridge and Ferries, and the Approaches and Landing Places connected therewith, or for the Erection of a new Bridge in lieu of the existing Bridge across such River. (Repealed by Tyne and Wear Act 1976 (c. xxxvi))
South Durham and Lancashire Union Railway Act 1857	20 & 21 Vict. c. xl	13 July 1857
An Act for making a Railway commencing by a Junction with the Haggarleazes Branch of the Stockton and Darlington Railway near the Lands Colliery in the County of Durham, and terminating by a Junction with the Lancaster and Carlisle Railway at or near Tebay in the County of Westmoreland; and for making Arrangements with the Stockton and Darlington Railway Company; and for other Purposes.
Ely Valley Railway Act 1857	20 & 21 Vict. c. xli	13 July 1857
An Act for making a Railway from the Llantrissant Station of the South Wales Railway to Penrhiwfer in the Parish of Llantrissant in the County of Glamorgan, with Branches to Glanmychydd and Mynydd Gellyrhaidd, both in the said Parish of Llantrissant.
New River Company's Act 1857	20 & 21 Vict. c. xlii	13 July 1857
An Act to enable the New River Company to raise a further Sum of Money, to construct other Sewers at Hertford, and to amend the Acts relating to the Company.
West Hartlepool Harbour and Railway Act 1857	20 & 21 Vict. c. xliii	13 July 1857
An Act to authorize the West Hartlepool Harbour and Railway Company to convert Loans into Debenture Stock, to raise further Capital, to arrange with Holders of Shares or Stock for Conversion thereof into other Shares or Stock; and for other Purposes.
Mansfield and Worksop Road Act 1857 (repealed)	20 & 21 Vict. c. xliv	13 July 1857
An Act for the Mansfield and Worksop Turnpike Road in the County of Nottingham. (Repealed by Mansfield and Worksop Road Act 1865 (28 & 29 Vict. c. ccix))
Borough of Portsmouth Waterworks Act 1857	20 & 21 Vict. c. xlv	13 July 1857
An Act for better supplying with Water the Inhabitants of the Borough of Portsmouth in the County of Southampton.
North-eastern Railway Company's (Lanchester Valley Branch) Act 1857 or the North Eastern Railway (Lanchester Valley Branch) Act 1857	20 & 21 Vict. c. xlvi	13 July 1857
An Act to enable the North-eastern Railway Company to make a Branch from their Bishop Auckland Branch Railway to the Conside Ironworks, to acquire additional Lands; and for other Purposes.
Ipswich Waterworks Act 1857	20 & 21 Vict. c. xlvii	13 July 1857
An Act for better supplying with Water the Town of Ipswich.
Fownhope and Holme Lacy Bridge Act 1857	20 & 21 Vict. c. xlviii	13 July 1857
An Act for making a Bridge over the River Wye, near to the Even Pitt Ferry, and Approaches thereto; tor discontinuing and regulating Ferries near to the Bridge; and for other Purposes.
Deeside Railway Extension Act 1857	20 & 21 Vict. c. xlix	27 July 1857
An Act for making a Railway from the Deeside Railway at Banchory to Charleston of Aboyne.
Banff, MacDuff and Turriff Extension Railway Act 1857	20 & 21 Vict. c. l	27 July 1857
An Act to incorporate a Company for extending the Banff, Macduff, and Turriff Junction Railway from Turriff to Banff and Macduff.
Cork and Youghal Railway Act 1857	20 & 21 Vict. c. li	27 July 1857
An Act to extend the Time for making the Cork and Youghal Railway, and to vary the borrowing Powers of the Company.
Stockton Gas Act 1857	20 & 21 Vict. c. lii	27 July 1857
An Act to unite and amalgamate the Stockton New Gas Company and the Stockton Gas Consumers Company (Limited); and to authorize the united Company to raise additional Capital, and to sell their Undertaking to the Mayor, Aldermen, and Burgesses of the Borough of Stockton; and for other Purposes.
Banff, Portsoy and Strathisla Railway Act 1857	20 & 21 Vict. c. liii	27 July 1857
An Act for making a Railway from the Grange Station of the Great North of Scotland Railway to the Harbour of Banff, with a Branch to the Harbour of Portsoy.
Bristol and South Wales Union Act 1857 or the Bristol and South Wales Union Railway Act 1857	20 & 21 Vict. c. liv	27 July 1857
An Act for making Railways between the City of Bristol and the South Wales Railway in the County of Monmouth, with a Steam Ferry across the River Severn in connexion therewith, for the Purpose of improving the Railway Communication between South Wales and Bristol, Southampton, and the South-western Districts of England.
Newcastle-under-Lyme and Leek Roads Act 1857	20 & 21 Vict. c. lv	27 July 1857
An Act to repeal the Act (Note: Newcastle-under-Lyme and Leek Roads Act 1828 (9 Geo. 4. c. iv)) relating to the Newcastle-under-Lyme and Leek Turnpike Roads, and to make other Provisions in lieu thereof.
Langport, Somerton and Castle Cary Turnpike Roads Act 1857	20 & 21 Vict. c. lvi	27 July 1857
An Act to repeal an Act passed in the Fifth Year of the Reign of His Majesty King George the Fourth, intituled "An Act for more effectually repairing and improving certain Roads leading to, through, and from the Towns of Langport, Somerton, and Castle Cary, in the County of Somerset, and for making and improving other Roads in the said County," (Note: Langport, Somerton and Castle Cary Roads Act 1824 (5 Geo. 4. c. xcviii)) and granting more effectual Powers in lieu thereof, and for making and improving new Lines of Road.
Lowestoft Water, Gas and Markets Act 1857	20 & 21 Vict. c. lvii	27 July 1857
An Act for authorizing the Lowestoft Water, Gas, and Market Company to make additional Waterworks and raise additional Capital, and to lease their Undertaking; and for other Purposes.
Shrewsbury Gasworks Act 1857	20 & 21 Vict. c. lviii	27 July 1857
An Act for lighting with Gas the Borough of Shrewsbury and the Neighbourhood thereof in the County of Salop.
Burslem and Tunstall Gas Company's Act 1857	20 & 21 Vict. c. lix	27 July 1857
An Act for incorporating the Burslem and Tunstall Gaslight Company and extending their Powers, and for authorizing additional Works, and the raising of further Moneys; and for other Purposes.
Lewes and Uckfield Railway Act 1857	20 & 21 Vict. c. lx	27 July 1857
An Act for making a Railway from Lewes to Uckfield, all in the County of Sussex.
Newry, Warrenpoint and Rostrevor Railway Amendment Act 1857	20 & 21 Vict. c. lxi	27 July 1857
An Act to authorize the Newry, Warrenpoint, and Rostrevor Railway Company to extend their Railway at Newry and at Warrenpoint, and to enter into Arrangements with the Newry and Enniskillen Railway Company.
Mallow and Fermoy Railway Transfer Act 1857	20 & 21 Vict. c. lxii	27 July 1857
An Act to dissolve the Mallow and Fermoy Railway Company, and to transfer all the Powers of that Company for making and maintaining the Mallow and Fermoy Railway to the Great Southern and Western Railway Company.
Bury Gas Act 1857 (repealed)	20 & 21 Vict. c. lxiii	27 July 1857
An Act for lighting with Gas the Town of Bury, and other Townships and Places in the Parish of Bury, in the County of Lancaster. (Repealed by Bury Corporation Act 1909 (9 Edw. 7. c. clix))
Cannock Mineral Railway Act 1857	20 & 21 Vict. c. lxiv	27 July 1857
An Act to extend the Time for the Completion of the Cannock Mineral Railway.
Selby and Market Weighton Turnpike Road Act 1857	20 & 21 Vict. c. lxv	27 July 1857
An Act to repeal the Acts relating to the Selby and Market Weighton Turnpike Road in the East Riding of the County of York; and to make other Provisions in lieu thereof.
West Somerset Mineral Railway Act 1857 (repealed)	20 & 21 Vict. c. lxvi	27 July 1857
An Act for authorizing the West Somerset Mineral Railway Company to make the Minehead Extension and the Cleeve Branch; and for other Purposes. (Repealed by West Somerset Mineral Railway (Abandonment) Act 1923 (13 & 14 Geo. 5. c. xciv))
Stratford-upon-Avon Gas Act 1857	20 & 21 Vict. c. lxvii	27 July 1857
An Act to incorporate the Stratford-upon-Avon Gas Company.
Australian Agricultural Company's Act 1857 (repealed)	20 & 21 Vict. c. lxviii	27 July 1857
An Act for granting additional Powers to "The Australian Agricultural Company." (Repealed by Australian Agricultural Company Act 1912 (2 & 3 Geo. 5. c. xlviii))
Penarth Harbour, Dock and Railway Act 1857	20 & 21 Vict. c. lxix	27 July 1857
An Act for enabling the Penarth Harbour, Dock, and Railway Company (heretofore called "The Ely Tidal Harbour and Railway Company") to construct Railways to and a Dock and other Works on or adjoining the South-west Bank of the River Ely, and for other Purposes.
Margate Waterworks Act 1857 (repealed)	20 & 21 Vict. c. lxx	27 July 1857
An Act for better supplying with Water the Inhabitants of the Parishes of Saint John the Baptist (including Margate) and Saint Peter the Apostle (including Broadstairs) in the County of Kent. (Repealed by Margate Corporation Act 1900 (63 & 64 Vict. c. ccl))
Tyne Improvement Act 1857 (repealed)	20 & 21 Vict. c. lxxi	27 July 1857
An Act to amend and enlarge the Provisions of the Acts relating to the River Tyne, and to enable the Tyne Improvement Commissioners to construct Docks at Coble Dean, and certain Works for the Improvement of such River; and for other Purposes. (Repealed by Port of Tyne Reorganisation Scheme 1967 Confirmation Order 1968 (SI 1968/942))
Wimbledon and Dorking Railway Act 1857	20 & 21 Vict. c. lxxii	27 July 1857
An Act for making a Railway from the London and South-western Railway at Wimbledon to Epsom; and for other Purposes.
London Gaslight Act 1857 (repealed)	20 & 21 Vict. c. lxxiii	27 July 1857
An Act for regulating the Payment of Dividends on certain Classes of Preference Shares in the London Gaslight Company. (Repealed by Statute Law (Repeals) Act 2013 (c. 2))
Milford Improvement Act 1857	20 & 21 Vict. c. lxxiv	27 July 1857
An Act for the Improvement of the Town of Milford and the Neighbourhood thereof, for establishing Gasworks, Waterworks, and a Cemetery there; and for other Purposes.
Orkney Roads Act 1857	20 & 21 Vict. c. lxxv	27 July 1857
An Act for more effectually making, repairing, and maintaining the Highways, Roads, and Bridges within the County of Orkney, and for other Purposes.
East Kent Railway (Extension to Dover) Amendment Act 1857	20 & 21 Vict. c. lxxvi	27 July 1857
An Act to amend "The East Kent Railway (Extension to Dover) Act, 1855." (Note: East Kent Railway (Extension to Dover) Act 1855 (18 & 19 Vict. c. clxxxvii))
Midland Great Western Railway of Ireland (Sligo Extension) Act 1857 (repealed)	20 & 21 Vict. c. lxxvii	27 July 1857
An Act to enable the Midland Great Western Railway of Ireland Company to make an Extension Line of Railway to Sligo, with Branches therefrom; and for other Purposes. (Repealed by Statute Law (Repeals) Act 2013 (c. 2))
Monkland Railways Branches Act 1857	20 & 21 Vict. c. lxxviii	27 July 1857
An Act to enable the Monkland Railways Company to make and maintain certain Railways in the Counties of Lanark and Linlithgow; and for other Purposes.
Briton Ferry Dock Act 1857	20 & 21 Vict. c. lxxix	27 July 1857
An Act to empower the Briton Ferry Floating Dock Company to raise Money; and for other Purposes connected with their Undertaking.
Glasgow City and Suburban Gas Company Act 1857 (repealed)	20 & 21 Vict. c. lxxx	27 July 1857
An Act for granting further Powers to "The City and Suburban Gas Company of Glasgow." (Repealed by Glasgow Gas Act 1910 (10 Edw. 7 & 1 Geo. 5. c. cxxxi))
Scottish Central Railway (Denny Branch Extensions) Act 1857 (repealed)	20 & 21 Vict. c. lxxxi	27 July 1857
An Act to enable the Scottish Central Railway Company to make and maintain certain Extensions of their Denny Branch. (Repealed by Scottish Central Railway Consolidation Act 1859 (22 & 23 Vict. c. lxxxiii))
Stamford and Essendine Railway Act 1857	20 & 21 Vict. c. lxxxii	27 July 1857
An Act to empower the Stamford and Essendine Railway Company to raise Money, and for other Purposes connected therewith.
Victoria (London) Docks Act 1857	20 & 21 Vict. c. lxxxiii	27 July 1857
An Act for authorizing the Victoria (London) Dock Company to make a new Cut Eastward of their Dock, and to raise additional Capital, and for other Purposes.
Great Northern and Western (of Ireland) Railway Act 1857	20 & 21 Vict. c. lxxxiv	27 July 1857
An Act for making Railways from Athlone to Roscommon and Castlereagh, to be called "The Great Northern and Western (of Ireland) Railway;" and for other Purposes.
Great Southern and Western Railway (Athlone Extension) Act 1857	20 & 21 Vict. c. lxxxv	27 July 1857
An Act to enable the Great Southern and Western Railway Company to make a Railway from Tullamore to Athlone; and for other Purposes
Leslie Railway Act 1857	20 & 21 Vict. c. lxxxvi	27 July 1857
An Act for making a Railway from the Edinburgh, Perth, and Dundee Railway at Markinch Station to the Town of Leslie, with Branches to Auchmuty Mills, Leven Bank Mill, and Prinlaws Lower Mills, and other Purposes.
Keith and Dufftown Railway Act 1857	20 & 21 Vict. c. lxxxvii	27 July 1857
An Act for making a Railway from Keith to Dufftown.
Dexthorpe Turnpike Road Act 1857 (repealed)	20 & 21 Vict. c. lxxxviii	27 July 1857
An Act to repeal so much of the Act (Note: Road from Bawtry Bridge to Hainton (Lincolnshire) Act 1827 (7 & 8 Geo. 4. c. lvii)) relating to the Road from Bawtry Bridge in the County of Nottingham to Hainton in the County of Lincoln, and other Roads, as relates to the Second District of Roads therein mentioned, and to make other Provisions in lieu thereof. (Repealed by Annual Turnpike Acts Continuance Act 1876 (39 & 40 Vict. c. 39))
Coal Duties (London, &c.) Drawback Act 1857 (repealed)	20 & 21 Vict. c. lxxxix	27 July 1857
An Act to allow a Drawback on the Duties payable on Coals, Culm, Coke, and Cinders. (Repealed by Statute Law (Repeals) Act 2008 (c. 12))
European and Indian Junction Telegraph Act 1857 or the European and Indian Junction Telegraph Company Act 1857	20 & 21 Vict. c. xc	27 July 1857
An Act for incorporating the European and Indian Junction Telegraph Company, and for other Purposes connected therewith.
West of Fife Mineral Railway (Roscobie Branch) Act 1857	20 & 21 Vict. c. xci	27 July 1857
An Act to enable the West of Fife Mineral Railway Company to construct a Branch Railway to Roscobie; and for certain other Purposes.
Clyde Navigation Act 1857 (repealed)	20 & 21 Vict. c. xcii	27 July 1857
An Act to continue or renew the Powers conferred on the Trustees on the River Clyde and Harbour of Glasgow to take Lands and execute Works for the Improvement of the Navigation; and for other Purposes. (Repealed by Clyde Navigation Consolidation Act 1858 (21 & 22 Vict. c. cxlix))
Pulteney Harbour Act 1857	20 & 21 Vict. c. xciii	27 July 1857
An Act to enable the British Fisheries Society to enlarge, improve, and maintain Pulteney Harbour in the County of Caithness; and for other Purposes.
Elie Harbour Act 1857	20 & 21 Vict. c. xciv	27 July 1857
An Act for improving and maintaining the Harbour of Elie in the County of Fife.
Treffry's Estate (Newquay Railway) Act 1857	20 & 21 Vict. c. xcv	27 July 1857
An Act for confirming the Title to Lands acquired for the Purposes of the Newquay Railway, Part of "the Treffry Estates," in the County of Cornwall, and for regulating the Railway; and for other Purposes.
Reading Railways Junction Act 1857	20 & 21 Vict. c. xcvi	27 July 1857
An Act to empower the Staines, Wokingham, and Woking Railway Company to make a Railway to connect the Reading, Guildford, and Reigate Railway with the Great Western Railway; and for other Purposes.
River Slaney Act 1857	20 & 21 Vict. c. xcvii	27 July 1857
An Act to repeal "The River Slaney Improvement Act, 1852," (Note: River Slaney Improvement Act 1852 (15 & 16 Vict. c. clii)) and to make better Provision for the Execution of the Objects of that Act; and for other Purposes connected with the River Slaney.
Stockport, Disley, and Whaley Bridge Railway Extension Act 1857	20 & 21 Vict. c. xcviii	27 July 1857
An Act to empower the Stockport, Disley, and Whaley Bridge Railway Company to extend their Railway to Buxton, and for other Purposes connected with their Undertaking.
Worksop and Attercliffe Road Act 1857	20 & 21 Vict. c. xcix	27 July 1857
An Act for the Worksop and Attercliffe Turnpike Road in the County of Nottingham and the West Riding of the County of York.
Westminster Terminus Railway, Extension Clapham to Norwood Abandonment Act 1857 (repealed)	20 & 21 Vict. c. c	27 July 1857
An Act for the Abandonment of the Westminster Terminus Railway Extension, Clapham to Norwood, and for other Purposes. (Repealed by Statute Law (Repeals) Act 2013 (c. 2))
Backwater Bridge and Road Act 1857	20 & 21 Vict. c. ci	27 July 1857
An Act for making a Bridge across the River Backwater near Weymouth, and a Turnpike Road, and other Works in connexion therewith, in the County of Dorset; and for other Purposes.
Atlantic Telegraph Act 1857	20 & 21 Vict. c. cii	27 July 1857
An Act to incorporate and regulate the Atlantic Telegraph Company, and to enable the Company to establish and work Telegraphs between Great Britain, Ireland, and Newfoundland; and for other Purposes.
Dartmouth and Torbay Railway Act 1857	20 & 21 Vict. c. ciii	27 July 1857
An Act for making a Railway from the Torquay Branch of the South Devon Railway to or near to Dartmouth, to be called "The Dartmouth and Torbay Railway;" and for other Purposes.
Dundalk and Enniskillen Railway Act 1857	20 & 21 Vict. c. civ	27 July 1857
An Act to enable the Dundalk and Enniskillen Railway Company to make certain Deviations and Alterations in their Line and Works; and for other Purposes connected with their Undertaking.
East Somerset Railway (Extension to Wells) Act 1857	20 & 21 Vict. c. cv	27 July 1857
An Act to authorize the East Somerset Railway Company to extend their Railway from Shepton Mallett to Wells.
Newtown and Machynlleth Railway Act 1857	20 & 21 Vict. c. cvi	27 July 1857
An Act for making a Railway from the Llanidloes and Newtown Railway in the Parish of Llandinam in the County of Montgomery to the Town of Machynlleth in the same County.
Prestwich, Bury and Radcliffe Roads Act 1857	20 & 21 Vict. c. cvii	27 July 1857
An Act for repairing the Roads from Prestwich to Bury and Ratcliffe in the County Palatine of Lancaster, and for making and maintaining as Turnpike certain other Roads in connexion therewith, all in the same County; and for other Purposes.
London and North-western Railway Act 1857	20 & 21 Vict. c. cviii	27 July 1857
An Act for authorizing the Conversion of Parts of the Shropshire Canal to Purposes of a Railway, and the making and maintaining of a Railway accordingly, and for authorizing Arrangements between the London and North-western Railway Company and other Companies; and for other Purposes.
North Level Act 1857	20 & 21 Vict. c. cix	10 August 1857
An Act for improving the North Level Drainage, and for other Purpose relating to the Level.
Coniston Railway Act 1857 (repealed)	20 & 21 Vict. c. cx	10 August 1857
An Act for making a Railway from Broughton to Coniston in the County Palatine of Lancaster; and for other Purposes. (Repealed by Furness and Coniston Railways Amalgamation Act 1862 (25 & 26 Vict. c. cxxxiii))
Lowestoft and Burgh St. Peter Ferry and Roads Act 1857	20 & 21 Vict. c. cxi	10 August 1857
An Act for establishing and maintaining a Ferry and Floating Bridge across the River Waveney, near Burgh Saint Peter Staithe in the Parishes of Oulton in the County of Suffolk, and Burgh Saint Peter in the County of Norfolk, with proper Works and Approach Roads thereto.
Bourn and Essendine Railway Act 1857 or the Bourne and Essendine Railways Act 1857	20 & 21 Vict. c. cxii	10 August 1857
An Act for making a Railway from the Essendine Station of the Great Northern Railway to Bourn in the County of Lincoln; and for other Purposes.
Midland Great Western Railway of Ireland (Streamstown and Clara Junction) Act 1857 (repealed)	20 & 21 Vict. c. cxiii	10 August 1857
An Act to enable the Midland Great Western Railway of Ireland Company to make a Railway from Streamstown to Clara; and for other Purposes. (Repealed by Statute Law (Repeals) Act 2013 (c. 2))
Blyth and Tyne Railway Amendment Act 1857	20 & 21 Vict. c. cxiv	10 August 1857
An Act to amend and enlarge some of the Provisions of "The Blyth and Tyne Railway Consolidation and Extensions Act, 1854;" (Note: Blyth and Tyne Railway Consolidation and Extensions Act 1854 (17 & 18 Vict. c. lxxix)) to authorize the Relinquishment of a Branch Railway authorized by that Act, and the Construction of other Railways and Works in connexion with the Blyth and Tyne Railway.
Covent Garden Approach and Southwark and Westminster Communication Act 1857 (repealed)	20 & 21 Vict. c. cxv	10 August 1857
An Act to enable the Metropolitan Board of Works to open certain new Streets in the City and Liberties of Westminster and in the Borough of Southwark. (Repealed by Local Law (Greater London Council and Inner London Boroughs) Order 1965 (SI 1965/540))
Stratford-upon-Avon Railway Act 1857	20 & 21 Vict. c. cxvi	10 August 1857
An Act for the making and maintaining of the Stratford-upon-Avon Railway; and for other Purposes.
Manchester Burial Board Act 1857	20 & 21 Vict. c. cxvii	10 August 1857
An Act to make better Provision for the Burial of the Dead in the City of Manchester, and for enabling the Corporation to purchase certain Lands and effect certain Improvements in that City.
Islington Parish Amendment Act 1857 (repealed)	20 & 21 Vict. c. cxviii	10 August 1857
An Act to amend Two several Acts passed respectively in the Fifth Year of the Reign of His late Majesty King George the Fourth and the Second Year of His late Majesty King William the Fourth, intituled respectively "An Act to repeal the several Acts for the Relief and Employment of the Poor of the Parish of Saint Mary Islington in the County of Middlesex; for lighting and watching, and preventing Nuisances and Annoyances therein; for amending the Road from Highgate through Maiden Lane, and several other Roads in the said Parish; and for providing a Chapel of Ease and an additional Burial Ground for the same; and to make more effectual Provisions in lieu thereof;" (Note: St. Mary Islington Improvement Act 1824 (5 Geo. 4. c. cxxv)) and "An Act to equalize the Ecclesiastical Burthens of the Parish of Saint Mary Islington in the County of Middlesex; for partially altering the Application of the Rents and Profits of the Stonefields Estate within the said Parish; for letting the Pews in the Parish Church of Saint Mary Islington and the Chapel of Ease thereto; and for other Purposes connected therewith;" (Note: St. Mary Islington and Stone Fields Estate Act 1832 (2 & 3 Will. 4. c. xxvi)) and to make other and more effectual Provisions in lien thereof. (Repealed by London Government (Borough of St. Marylebone) Order in Council 1901 (SR&O 1901/272))
Newport, Abergavenny and Hereford Railway (Branches) Act 1857	20 & 21 Vict. c. cxix	10 August 1857
An Act to enable the Newport, Abergavenny, and Hereford Railway Company to extend their Railway into the Aberdare and Bargoed Valleys in Glamorganshire, and for other Purposes connected with the Company.
Portadown, Dungannon and Omagh Junction Railway Act 1857	20 & 21 Vict. c. cxx	10 August 1857
An Act to amend and enlarge the Powers of the Acts relating to the Portadown and Dungannon Railway Company, and to enable that Company to extend their Railway to the Town of Omagh in the County of Tyrone, and to enter into certain Arrangements with the Ulster and other Railway Companies with respect to the working and leasing of the Railway; and for other Purposes
Salisbury and Yeovil Railway Deviation Act 1857	20 & 21 Vict. c. cxxi	10 August 1857
An Act to enable the Salisbury and Yeovil Railway Company to make Deviations from the Line of their Railway, and for other Purposes connected with their Undertaking.
Whitehaven and Furness Junction Railway Act 1857	20 & 21 Vict. c. cxxii	10 August 1857
An Act to enable the Whitehaven and Furness Junction Railway Company to raise additional Capital; and for other Purposes.
Caledonian Railway (Granton Branches) Act 1857	20 & 21 Vict. c. cxxiii	10 August 1857
An Act to enable the Caledonian Railway Company to construct Branch Railways from their Line near Edinburgh to Granton; and for other Purposes.
Kinross-shire Railway Act 1857	20 & 21 Vict. c. cxxiv	10 August 1857
An Act for making a Railway from the Dunfermline Branch of the Edinburgh, Perth, and Dundee Railway to Kinross, with a Branch to Kingseat; and for other Purposes.
Metropolitan Railway (Amendment) Act 1857	20 & 21 Vict. c. cxxv	10 August 1857
An Act to extend the Time for the Purchase of certain Lands required for the Metropolitan Railway; and for other Purposes.
South Staffordshire Waterworks Amendment Act 1857	20 & 21 Vict. c. cxxvi	10 August 1857
An Act to enable the South Staffordshire Waterworks Company to alter and extend their Works, and obtain an additional Supply of Water; and for other Purposes.
Victoria Docks Gas Act 1857	20 & 21 Vict. c. cxxvii	10 August 1857
An Act for incorporating the Victoria Gas Company, and for authorizing them to acquire and enlarge the North Woolwich Gasworks, and to supply Gas; and for other Purposes.
Hamilton and Strathaven Railway Act 1857	20 & 21 Vict. c. cxxviii	10 August 1857
An Act for making a Railway from near Hamilton to near Strathaven in the County of Lanark, to be called "The Hamilton and Strathaven Railway;" and for other Purposes.
Fife and Kinross Railway Diversion and Extension Act 1857	20 & 21 Vict. c. cxxix	10 August 1857
An Act to enable the Fife and Kinross Railway Company to divert Part of their Main Line, and to make an Extension from Milnathort to Kinross.
Great Yarmouth Waterworks Act 1857	20 & 21 Vict. c. cxxx	10 August 1857
An Act to enable the Great Yarmouth Waterworks Company to raise a further Sum of Money.
Otley and Skipton Road Act 1857 (repealed)	20 & 21 Vict. c. cxxxi	10 August 1857
An Act for continuing the Term and amending and extending the Provisions of the Act (Note: Road from Otley to Skipton Act 1823 (4 Geo. 4. c. xxxi)) relating to the Otley and Shipton Turnpike Road, and to create a further Term therein; and for other Purposes. (Repealed by Annual Turnpike Acts Continuance Act 1878 (41 & 42 Vict. c. 62))
Salford Borough Act 1857	20 & 21 Vict. c. cxxxii	10 August 1857
An Act to give further Powers to the Mayor, Aldermen, and Burgesses of the Borough of Salford with respect to Burial Purposes, and to authorize Arrangements with respect to Lands in and near Marlborough Square in Salford.
Mid Sussex Railway Act 1857	20 & 21 Vict. c. cxxxiii	10 August 1857
An Act for making a Railway from the London, Brighton, and South Coast Railway at Horsham, through Billingshurst, to Pulborough, with a Branch from Pulborough to Coultershaw Mill in the Parish of Petworth, all in the County of Sussex.
North-western Railway Act 1857	20 & 21 Vict. c. cxxxiv	10 August 1857
An Act authorizing the North-western Railway Company to divert a Portion of their Railway, and to sell or grant a Lease of their Undertaking to the Midland and Lancaster and Carlisle Railway Companies.
Metropolitan Market Act 1857 (repealed)	20 & 21 Vict. c. cxxxv	10 August 1857
An Act to amend an Act of the Twenty-first Year of the Reign of King George the Third, (Note: Driving of Cattle, Metropolis Act 1781 (21 Geo. 3. c. 67)) "to prevent the Mischiefs that arise from driving Cattle within the Cities of London and Westminster, and Liberties thereof, and Bills of Mortality," and also to amend "The Metropolitan Market Act, 1851." (Note: Metropolitan Market Act 1851 (14 & 15 Vict. c. 61)) (Repealed by City of London (Various Powers) Act 1963 (c. xxxiv))
London and South-western Railway Act 1857	20 & 21 Vict. c. cxxxvi	10 August 1857
An Act for authorizing the London and South-western Railway Company and others to make Deviations from their authorized Lines of Railway and other Works; and for authorizing divers other Matters affecting that Company and other Companies and Undertakings; and for other Purposes.
Oldham, Ashton, and Guide Bridge Junction Railway Act 1857	20 & 21 Vict. c. cxxxvii	10 August 1857
An Act for the Construction of Railways to supply direct Communication between Oldham, Ashton-under-Lyne, and Guide Bridge, and for the Accommodation of the Neighbourhood.
Great Northern Railway (Capital) Act 1857	20 & 21 Vict. c. cxxxviii	10 August 1857
An Act to make Provision with respect to Capital fraudulently created in the Great Northern and East Lincolnshire Railway Companies.
Dorset Central Railway Act 1857	20 & 21 Vict. c. cxxxix	10 August 1857
An Act for authorizing an Extension of the Dorset Central Railway; for regulating the Capital of the Dorset Central Railway Company; and for other Purposes.
Rhymney Railway Act 1857	20 & 21 Vict. c. cxl	10 August 1857
An Act for consolidating the Acts relating to the Rhymney Railway Company, and for authorizing the Company to make and maintain a Branch Railway, and for regulating the Capital of the Company; and for other Purposes.
Watchet Harbour Act 1857 (repealed)	20 & 21 Vict. c. cxli	10 August 1857
An Act for the Maintenance, Regulation, and Improvement of Watchet Harbour in the County of Somerset; and for other Purposes. (Repealed by Watchet Harbour Act 1860 (23 & 24 Vict. c. cli))
Swansea Harbour Act 1857	20 & 21 Vict. c. cxlii	10 August 1857
An Act for the Transfer of the Docks of the Swansea Dock Company to the Swansea Harbour Trustees; and for authorizing those Trustees to make further Works, and raise further Moneys; and for other Purposes.
West London and Crystal Palace Railway Act 1857	20 & 21 Vict. c. cxliii	10 August 1857
An Act for authorizing Traffic Arrangements between the West End of London and Crystal Palace and the London, Brighton, and South Coast, the South-eastern, and London and South-western Railway Companies; for Sale of the West London and Crystal Palace Railway; for extending the Time for completing Railways; and for other Purposes.
Haslingden and Todmorden Turnpike Road Act 1857	20 & 21 Vict. c. cxliv	17 August 1857
An Act for repairing the Road from Haslingden to Todmorden, and several Branches therefrom, all in the County Palatine of Lancaster; and for other Purposes.
West Somerset Railway Act 1857	20 & 21 Vict. c. cxlv	17 August 1857
An Act to authorize the Construction of a Railway from Taunton to the Harbour of Watchet; and for other Purposes relating to the said Railway and Harbour.
Norfolk Estuary Act 1857 (repealed)	20 & 21 Vict. c. cxlvi	17 August 1857
An Act to alter, amend, and consolidate the Acts relating to the Company of Proprietors of the Norfolk Estuary. (Repealed by Norfolk Estuary Act 1877 (40 & 41 Vict. c. cciii))
Thames Conservancy Act 1857 (repealed)	20 & 21 Vict. c. cxlvii	17 August 1857
An Act to provide for the Conservation of the River Thames, and for the Regulation, Management, and Improvement thereof. (Repealed by Thames Conservancy Act 1894 (57 & 58 Vict. c. clxxxvii))
Tweed Fisheries Act 1857 (repealed)	20 & 21 Vict. c. cxlviii	17 August 1857
An Act to consolidate and amend the Acts for the more effectual Preservation and Increase of Salmon, and the Regulation of the Fisheries in the River Tweed. (Repealed by Scotland Act 1998 (River Tweed) Order 2006 (SI 2006/2913))
Portpatrick Railway Act 1857	20 & 21 Vict. c. cxlix	17 August 1857 (Note: The Queen's Printer's copy incorrectly gives the date as 10 August 1857.)
An Act to authorize the Construction of a Railway from Castle Douglas in the Stewartry of Kirkcudbright to Portpatrick in the County of Wigtown.
Finsbury Park Act 1857	20 & 21 Vict. c. cl	17 August 1857
An Act to enable the Metropolitan Board of Works to form a Park for the Northern Suburbs of the Metropolis, to be called Finsbury Park.
Sittingbourne and Sheerness Railway Act 1857	20 & 21 Vict. c. cli	17 August 1857
An Act to enable the Sittingbourne and Sheerness Railway Company to alter the Line and Levels of Portions of their authorized Line and abandon Portions thereof; to construct new Branches and other Works; to authorize Working Arrangements with the East Kent Railway Company; to amend "The Sittingbourne and Sheerness Railway Act, 1856;" (Note: Sittingbourne and Sheerness Railway Act 1856 (19 & 20 Vict. c. lxxv)) and for other Purposes.
Herne Bay and Faversham Railway Act 1857	20 & 21 Vict. c. clii	17 August 1857
An Act for making a Railway from Heme Bag to Faversham, and for other Purposes connected therewith.
Taff Vale Railway Act 1857	20 & 21 Vict. c. cliii	17 August 1857
An Act for enabling the Taff Vale Railway Company lo construct new Lines of Railway, to alter, widen, and improve Portions of their existing Railway, and for other Purposes.
New Brunswick and Canada Railway and Land Company's Act 1857	20 & 21 Vict. c. cliv	17 August 1857
An Act for the Transfer of the Interests of the Class A Shareholders of the Saint Andrew's and Quebec Railroad Company to "The New Brunswick and Canada Railway and Land Company (Limited)."
South Eastern Railway Act 1857	20 & 21 Vict. c. clv	17 August 1857
An Act to enable the South-eastern Railway Company to make or complete a short Line of Railway at Tunbridge; and for other Purposes.
Newry and Enniskillen Railway Amendment and Extension Act 1857	20 & 21 Vict. c. clvi	17 August 1857
An Act enabling the Newry and Enniskillen Railway Company to construct their Railway as far as the City of Armagh; for changing the Name of the Company; and for consolidating their Acts.
Mayor's Court of London Procedure Act 1857 (repealed)	20 & 21 Vict. c. clvii	17 August 1857
An Act for abolishing certain Jurisdiction of the Sheriffs Courts of the City of London, and for amending the Process, Practice, and Mode of Pleading in the Mayor's Court, and for extending the Jurisdiction thereo. (Repealed by Administration of Justice Act 1977 (c. 38))
Wycombe Railway (Extension) Act 1857	20 & 21 Vict. c. clviii	17 August 1857
An Act to authorize the Wycombe Railway Company to extend their Railway to Princes Risborough and to Thame.
Eastern Bengal Railway Act 1857 (repealed)	20 & 21 Vict. c. clix	25 August 1857
An Act for incorporating the Eastern Bengal Railway Company, and for other Purposes. (Repealed by Statute Law (Repeals) Act 2013 (c. 2))
Scinde Railway Act 1857 (repealed)	20 & 21 Vict. c. clx	25 August 1857
An Act for authorising the Scinde Railway Company to extend their Operations, and for regulating the Capital of the Company; and for other Purposes. (Repealed by Statute Law (Repeals) Act 2013 (c. 2))
Lancaster and Carlisle and Ingleton Railway Act 1857	20 & 21 Vict. c. clxi	25 August 1857
An Act for making a Railway from the Lancaster and Carlisle Railway in the Parish of Kendal in the County of Westmoreland to the North-western Railway at or near Ingleton in the West Riding of the County of York, with a Branch therefrom; and for other Purposes.
Mersey Docks and Harbour Act 1857	20 & 21 Vict. c. clxii	25 August 1857
An Act for consolidating the Docks at Liverpool and Birhenhead into One Estate, and for vesting the Control and Management of them in One Public Trust; and for other Purposes.

=== Private acts ===
Short title	Citation	Royal assent
Long title
Scotscraig Estate Act 1857	20 & 21 Vict. c. 1 Pr.	3 July 1857
An Act for enabling the Trustees in whom the Lands and Estate of Scotscraig in the County of Fife are vested to grant Fens of certain Portions thereof.
Fleming's Estate Act 1857	20 & 21 Vict. c. 2 Pr.	27 July 1857
An Act to amend and explain Fleming's Estate Act, 1852. (Note: Fleming's Estate Act 1852 (15 & 16 Vict. c. 19 Pr.))
Hereford Cathedral Restoration Act 1857	20 & 21 Vict. c. 3 Pr.	27 July 1857
An Act for authorising the Dean and Chapter of Hereford to raise Money for the Repair of the Cathedral Church of Hereford.
Bridgewater Trustees Act 1857	20 & 21 Vict. c. 4 Pr.	25 August 1857
An Act to enable the Trustees of the Will of the late Francis Duke of Bridgewater to complete the Purchase of the Runcorn and Weston Canal, and to enable such Trustees more effectually to administer the Trusts of the Will of the said Duke.
Lord Rivers' Estate Act 1857	20 & 21 Vict. c. 5 Pr.	25 August 1857
An Act for authorising the Sale to the Dorset Central Railway Company, in consideration partly of a yearly Rentcharge and property of a gross Sum, of Part of the Settled Estates in the County of Dorset of which the Right Honourable George Pitt Rivers Lord Rivers is now Tenant for Life in possession; and for other Purposes.
Carew's Estate Act 1857	20 & 21 Vict. c. 6 Pr.	25 August 1857
An Act for carrying into effect an Agreement for a Compromise of the Suit of "Carew versus Waugh," now pending in the High Court of Chancery, and for vesting the Estates to which the Suit relates in Trustees upon Trust for Sale; and for other Purposes.
Baroness Windsor's Estate Act 1857	20 & 21 Vict. c. 7 Pr.	25 August 1857
An Act for authorizing the raising of Money on the Security of Estates in the County of Glamorgan, settled by the Will of the Right Honourable Other Archer late Earl of Plymouth deceased, and the Application of the Money for the Improvement of Parts of the Estates, in order to render them available as Building Lands, and for confirming an Agreement with the Penarth Harbour, Dock, and Railway Company, heretofore called the Ely Tidal Harbour and Railway Company; and for other Purposes.
Giustiniani's Oath Act 1857 (Note: This act was not printed by the Queen's Printer.)	20 & 21 Vict. c. 8 Pr.	26 June 1857
An Act for authorizing Maria Cecilia Agatha Anna Josepha Laurentia Donata Melchiora Balthassara Gaspara Princess Giustiniani, Widow of Charles Marquess Bandini, to take the Oath proper to be taken by her prior to her Naturalization before Her Majesty's Envoy Extraordinary to the Grand Duke of Tuscany, or any other Member of Her Majesty's Legation at the Court of Tuscany, and to give her Consent in Writing to the passing of the Bill for her Naturalization.
Ley's Divorce Act 1857	20 & 21 Vict. c. 9 Pr.	27 July 1857
An Act to dissolve the Marriage of Edward Ley, Oil Cooper, with Bosanna Sarah Ley his now Wife, and to enable him to marry again; and for other Purposes therein mentioned.
Campbell's Divorce Act 1857	20 & 21 Vict. c. 10 Pr.	27 July 1857
An Act to dissolve the Marriage of Alexander Campbell with Maria his now Wife, and to enable him to marry again; and for other Purposes.
Smith's Divorce Act 1857	20 & 21 Vict. c. 11 Pr.	27 July 1857
An Act to dissolve the Marriage of Henry Smith Esquire with Julia his now Wife, and to enable him to marry again; and for other Purposes therein mentioned.
Shepherd's Disabilities Removal Act 1857	20 & 21 Vict. c. 12 Pr.	17 August 1857
An Act to enable Robert Shepherd, Clerk, to exercise his Office of a Priest and to hold any Benefice or Preferment in the United Church of England and Ireland,
Baring's Divorce Act 1857	20 & 21 Vict. c. 13 Pr.	17 August 1857
An Act to dissolve the Marriage of William Frederick Baring Esquire with Emily his now Wife, and to enable him to marry again; and for other Purposes.
Giustiniani's Naturalization Act 1857	20 & 21 Vict. c. 14 Pr.	17 August 1857
An Act for naturalizing Maria Cecilia Agatha Anna Josepha Laurentia Donata Melchiora Balthassara Gaspara Princess Giustiniani, Widow of Charles Marquess Bandini in the Roman States, and Sigismund Nicholas Venantius Gaietano Francis Marquess Bandini, the only Son and Heir Apparent of the said Princess Giustiniani Marchioness Dowager Bandini by the said Charles Marquess Bandini her late Husband.
Keays' Divorce Act 1857	20 & 21 Vict. c. 15 Pr.	25 August 1857
An Act to dissolve the Marriage of Robert Keays Esquire with Maria Eliza his now Wife, and to enable him to marry again; and for other Purposes.

=== Sources ===
- The Statutes of the United Kingdom of Great Britain and Ireland, 21 & 22 Victoria, 1857. London: Eyre and Spottiswoode. 1857 – via Internet Archive.

== 21 & 22 Vict. ==
The second session of the 17th Parliament of the United Kingdom, which met from 3 December 1857 until 2 August 1858.

=== Public general acts ===
Short title	Citation	Royal assent
Long title
Bank Issues Indemnity Act 1857 (repealed)	21 & 22 Vict. c. 1	12 December 1857
An Act to indemnify the Governor and Company of the Bank of England in respect of certain Issues of their Notes, and to confirm each Issue, and to authorize further Issues for a Time to be limited. (Repealed by Statute Law Revision Act 1870 (33 & 34 Vict. c. 69))

=== Sources ===
- A Collection of the Public General Statutes Passed in the Twenty-First and Twenty-Second Years of the Reign of Her Majesty Queen Victoria. London: Eyre & Spottiswoode. 1858 – via Internet Archive.

== See also ==
- List of acts of the Parliament of the United Kingdom
