= National Health Insurance Act 1936 =

Act of the Parliament of the United Kingdom

National Health Insurance Act 1936 (Note: Section 229(1).)
- Act of Parliament
- Parliament of the United Kingdom
- Long title: An Act to consolidate the enactments relating to National Health Insurance.
- Citation: 26 Geo. 5 & 1 Edw. 8. c. 32
- Territorial extent: United Kingdom

Dates
- Royal assent: 14 July 1936
- Commencement: 1 January 1937 (Note: Section 229(2).)
- Repealed: 5 July 1948
Other legislation
Amends	See § Repealed enactments
Repeals/revokes	See § Repealed enactments
Amended by	Companies Act 1948
Repealed by	National Insurance Act 1946
Relates to	Old Age Pensions Act 1936; Widows', Orphans' and Old Age Contributory Pensions Act 1936

Status: Repealed

Text of statute as originally enacted

The National Health Insurance Act 1936 (26 Geo. 5 & 1 Edw. 8. c. 32) was an act of the Parliament of the United Kingdom that consolidated enactments related to national health insurance in the United Kingdom.

== Provisions ==
=== Repealed enactments ===
Section 228 of the act repealed 35 enactments, listed in parts I and II of the sixth schedule to the act.

Part I - enactments repealed
Citation	Short title	Extent of repeal
1 & 2 Geo. 5. c. 55	National Insurance Act 1911	Sections seventy-two and seventy-three.
3 & 4 Geo. 5. c. 37	National Insurance Act 1913	Section one.
10 & 11 Geo. 5. c. 10	National Health Insurance Act 1920	The whole act.
12 & 13 Geo. 5. c. 38	National Health Insurance Act 1922	The whole act.
14 & 15 Geo. 5. c. 38	National Health Insurance Act 1924	The whole act.
15 & 16 Geo. 5. c. 70	Widows', Orphans' and Old Age Contributory Pensions Act 1925	Paragraph (b) of subsection (2) of section nine; section thirteen; subsection (5) of section fourteen, other than the proviso to that subsection; subsection (6) of section fifteen; sections thirty-seven and thirty-eight; subsection (b) of section forty-five; and the Fourth Schedule.
16 & 17 Geo. 5. c. 9	Economy (Miscellaneous Provisions) Act 1926	Part I; the First Schedule.
18 & 19 Geo. 5. c. 14	National Health Insurance Act 1928	The whole act.
20 Geo. 5. c. 10	Widows', Orphans' and Old Age Contributory Pensions Act 1929	Subsection (4) of section three; subsections (1) and (2) of section nine; section twenty-one; section twenty-five.
SR&O 1929/10	National Health Insurance (Extension of Enactments to Northern Ireland) Order 1929	The whole order.
21 & 22 Geo. 5. c. 6	National Health Insurance (Prolongation of Insurance) Act 1930	The whole act.
22 & 23 Geo. 5. c. 6	National Health Insurance (Prolongation of Insurance) Act 1931	The whole act.
SR&O 1931/813	National Economy (National Health Insurance) Order 1931	Article four.
22 & 23 Geo. 5. c. 52	National Health Insurance and Contributory Pensions Act 1932	The whole act except section ten.
23 & 24 Geo. 5. c. 33	Metropolitan Police Act 1933	Subsection (3) of section four so far as that subsection relates to national health insurance; paragraph 1 of the Schedule.
25 & 26 Geo. 5. c. 44	National Health Insurance and Contributory Pensions Act 1935	Sections one to fifteen; section twenty-two; subsections (1), (2) and (3) of section twenty-three; the First Schedule.
SR&O 1936/177	National Health Insurance (Extension of Enactments to Northern Ireland) Order 1936	The whole order.

Part II - Northern Ireland enactments repealed
Citation	Short title	Extent of repeal
12 & 13 Geo. 5. c. 15 (N.I.)	National Health Insurance Act (Northern Ireland) 1922	The whole act.
14 & 15 Geo. 5. c. 16 (N.I.)	National Health Insurance Act (Northern Ireland) 1924	The whole act.
14 & 15 Geo. 5. c. 21 (N.I.)	Illegitimate Children (Affiliation Orders) Act (Northern Ireland) 1924	Subsection (4) of section one.
15 & 16 Geo. 5. c. 17 (N.I.)	Government Loans and Exchequer Provisions Act (Northern Ireland) 1925	Section fourteen.
15 & 16 Geo. 5. c. 23 (N.I.)	Widows', Orphans' and Old Age Contributory Pensions Act (Northern Ireland) 1925	Paragraph (b) of subsection (2) of section nine; section thirteen; subsection (5) of section fourteen other than the proviso to that subsection; subsection (5) of section fifteen; sections thirty-seven and thirty-eight; the Fourth Schedule, so far as unrepealed.
16 & 17 Geo. 5. c. 11 (N.I.)	Economy (Exchequer Relief) Act (Northern Ireland) 1926	Part I; the First Schedule.
18 & 19 Geo. 5. c. 11 (N.I.)	National Health Insurance Act (Northern Ireland) 1928	The whole act, so far as unrepealed.
SR&O 1928/122 (N.I.)	National Health Insurance (Extension of Enactments) Order (Northern Ireland) 1928	The whole order.
20 Geo. 5. c. 17 (N.I.)	Widows', Orphans' and Old Age Contributory Pensions Act (Northern Ireland) 1929	Subsection (4) of section three; subsections (1) and (2) of section nine; subsection (2) of section twenty, so far as it relates to the National Health Insurance Act, 1924; sections twenty-one and twenty-five.
20 & 21 Geo. 5. c. 13 (N.I.)	National Health Insurance Act (Northern Ireland) 1930	The whole act, except section thirteen.
21 & 22 Geo. 5 c. 6 (N.I.)	National Health Insurance Act (Northern Ireland) 1931	The whole act.
21 & 22 Geo. 5 (N.I.) c. 11	Economy Act (Northern Ireland) 1931	So far as the Act relates to national health insurance.
SR&O 1931/152 (N.I.)	Economy (National Health Insurance) Order (Northern Ireland) 1931	Article four.
21 & 22 Geo. 5. c. 23 (N.I.)	National Health Insurance (No. 2) Act (Northern Ireland) 1931	The whole act.
22 & 23 Geo. 5. c. 12 (N.I.)	National Health Insurance and Contributory Pensions Act (Northern Ireland) 1932	The whole act so far as it relates to national health insurance.
SR&O 1932/88 (N.I.)	National Health Insurance and Contributory Pensions (Enactments) Order (Northern Ireland) 1932	Paragraphs (a), (b) and (d) of Article two; Article three.
25 & 26 Geo. 5. c. 14 (N.I.)	National Health Insurance and Contributory Pensions Act (Northern Ireland) 1935	Section one so far as it relates to national health insurance; sections two and three; subsection (2) of section six and subsection (4) of that section, so far as it relates to national health insurance.
SR&O 1935/100 (N.I.)	National Health Insurance and Contributory Pensions (Enactments) Order (Northern Ireland) 1935	Paragraphs (b), (c), (d) and (e), and, so far as it relates to national health insurance, paragraph (a), of Article two.

== Subsequent developments ==
The whole act was repealed by section 65(1) of, and the ninth schedule to, the National Insurance Act 1946 (9 & 10 Geo. 6. c. 67), which came into force on 5 July 1948.
