= Widows', Orphans' and Old Age Contributory Pensions Act 1936 =

Act of the Parliament of the United Kingdom

Widows', Orphans' and Old Age Contributory Pensions Act 1936 (Note: Section 46(1).)
- Act of Parliament
- Parliament of the United Kingdom
- Long title: An Act to consolidate the enactments relating to Widows', Orphans' and Old Age Contributory Pensions.
- Citation: 26 Geo. 5 & 1 Edw. 8. c. 33
- Territorial extent: England and Wales; Scotland; (Note: Section 46(3).)

Dates
- Royal assent: 14 July 1936
- Commencement: 1 January 1937 (Note: Section 46(2).)
- Repealed: 5 July 1948
Other legislation
Amends	See § Repealed enactments
Repeals/revokes	See § Repealed enactments
Repealed by	National Insurance Act 1946
Relates to	Old Age Pensions Act 1936; National Health Insurance Act 1936

Status: Repealed

Text of statute as originally enacted

The Widows', Orphans' and Old Age Contributory Pensions Act 1936 (26 Geo. 5 & 1 Edw. 8. c. 33) was an act of the Parliament of the United Kingdom that consolidated enactments related to widows', orphans' and old age contributory pensions in Great Britain.

== Provisions ==
=== Repealed enactments ===
Section 45 of the act repealed 10 enactments, listed in the fifth schedule to the act.

Citation	Short title	Extent of repeal
15 & 16 Geo. 5. c. 70	Widows', Orphans' and Old Age Contributory Pensions Act 1925	The whole act, except paragraph (b) of subsection (2) of section nine, section thirteen, subsection (5) of section fourteen, other than the proviso to that subsection, subsection (6) of section fifteen, sections thirty-seven and thirty-eight, subsection (b) of section forty-five, and the Fourth Schedule.
20 Geo. 5. c. 10	Widows', Orphans' and Old Age Contributory Pensions Act 1929	The whole act, except subsection (4) of section three, subsections (1) and (2) of section nine, section twenty-one, and section twenty-five.
20 & 21 Geo. 5. c. 37	Adoption of Children (Scotland) Act 1930	In subsection (2) of section five the words "Widows', Orphans' and Old Age Contributory Pensions Acts, 1925 and 1929, and", and the proviso to that subsection.
21 & 22 Geo. 5. c. 19	Widows', Orphans' and Old Age Contributory Pensions Act 1931	The whole act.
21 & 22 Geo. 5. c. 31	Adoption of Children (Scotland) Act 1931	The whole act.
SR&O 1931/813	National Economy (National Health Insurance) Order 1931	Article three.
22 & 23 Geo. 5. c. 52	National Health Insurance and Contributory Pensions Act 1932	Section ten.
23 & 24 Geo. 5. c. 33	Metropolitan Police Act 1933	Subsection (3) of section four, so far as that subsection relates to widows', orphans' and old age contributory pensions; paragraph 2 of the Schedule.
24 & 25 Geo. 5. c. 29	Unemployment Assistance Act 1934	Section forty-nine.
25 & 26 Geo. 5. c. 44	National Health Insurance and Contributory Pensions Act 1935	Sections sixteen to twenty-one; section twenty-three, except subsections (1), (2) and (3); section twenty-four; the Second Schedule.

== Subsequent developments ==
The whole act was repealed by section 65(1) of, and the ninth schedule to, the National Insurance Act 1946 (9 & 10 Geo. 6. c. 67), which came into force on 5 July 1948.
