= Pensions (Increase) Act 1947 =

Act of the Parliament of the United Kingdom

Pensions (Increase) Act 1947 (Note: Section 6(1).)
- Act of Parliament
- Parliament of the United Kingdom
- Long title: An Act to authorise further increases under, and otherwise amend, the Pensions (Increase) Act, 1944, and to continue that Act in force as amended; to authorise further increases under the Pensions (Increase) Act, 1920; and to authorise increases in pensions to which that Act does not apply.
- Citation: 10 & 11 Geo. 6. c. 7
- Territorial extent: United Kingdom

Dates
- Royal assent: 18 February 1947
- Commencement: 18 February 1947 (Note: The Acts of Parliament (Commencement) Act 1793.)
- Repealed: 1 September 1971
Other legislation
Amends	Pensions (Increase) Act 1920; Pensions (Increase) Act 1944
Amended by	Police Pensions Act 1948
Repealed by	Pensions (Increase) Act 1971

Status: Repealed

Text of statute as originally enacted

The Pensions (Increase) Act 1947 (10 & 11 Geo. 6. c. 7) was an act of the Parliament of the United Kingdom. It was passed during the Labour government of Clement Attlee. It substantially raised the benefit rates for pensioners.

== Subsequent developments ==
The whole act was repealed by section 18(1) of, and schedule 7 to, the Pensions (Increase) Act 1971, which came into force on 1 September 1971.
