= Pensions (Increase) Act 1971 =

Act of the Parliament of the United Kingdom

Pensions (Increase) Act 1971 (Note: Section 19(1).)
- Act of Parliament
- Parliament of the United Kingdom
- Long title: An Act to replace the Pensions (Increase) Acts 1920 to 1969 and make further provision for increases and supplements to be paid on certain pensions and related benefits.
- Citation: 1971 c. 56
- Territorial extent: England and Wales; Scotland; (Note: Section 19(2).)

Dates
- Royal assent: 27 July 1971
- Commencement: 27 July 1971 (Note: The Acts of Parliament (Commencement) Act 1793.)

Other legislation
- Amends: See § Repealed enactments
- Repeals/revokes: See § Repealed enactments
- Amended by: List: Superannuation Act 1972; Parliamentary and other Pensions Act 1972; Pensions Increase (Reduction of Qualifying Age) Order 1972; Administration of Justice Act 1973; Overseas Pensions Act 1973; National Health Service Reorganisation Act 1973; Pensions (Increase) Act 1974; Minister of Overseas Development Order 1974; Local Authorities etc. (Miscellaneous Provision) (No. 2) Order 1974; Social Security Pensions Act 1975; Children Act 1975; Scottish Development Agency Act 1975; Trustee Savings Banks Act 1976; Police Pensions Act 1976; New Towns (Scotland) Act 1977; Rent Act 1977; European Parliament (Pay and Pensions) Act 1979; Ministry of Overseas Development (Dissolution) Order 1979; Reserve Forces Act 1980; Road Traffic Regulation Act 1984; Local Government Act 1985; Transport Act 1985; Statute Law (Repeals) Act 1986; Parliamentary and other Pensions Act 1987; Coroners Act 1988; Education Reform Act 1988; London Government Reorganisation (Pensions etc.) Order 1989; Pensions (Miscellaneous Provisions) Act 1990; Enterprise and New Towns (Scotland) Act 1990; Local Government Finance (Repeals, Savings and Consequential Amendments) Order 1990; London Government Reorganisation (Pensions etc.) (Amendment) Order 1990; Local Government Finance Act 1992; Judicial Pensions and Retirement Act 1993; Pension Schemes Act 1993; Police and Magistrates' Courts Act 1994; Pensions Act 1995; Police Act 1996; Education Act 1996; Scotland Act 1998; Access to Justice Act 1999; Greater London Authority Act 1999; Welfare Reform and Pensions Act 1999; Postal Services Act 2000; Criminal Justice and Court Services Act 2000; International Development Act 2002; Statute Law (Repeals) Act 2004; Fire and Rescue Services Act 2004; Government of Wales Act 2006; Statute Law (Repeals) Act 2008; Offender Management Act 2007 (Consequential Amendments) Order 2008; Coroners and Justice Act 2009; Constitutional Reform and Governance Act 2010; Postal Services Act 2011; Police Reform and Social Responsibility Act 2011; Finance Act 2012; Public Service Pensions Act 2013; Police and Fire Reform (Scotland) Act 2012 (Consequential Provisions and Modifications) Order 2013; Marriage (Same Sex Couples) Act 2013 (Consequential and Contrary Provisions and Scotland) Order 2014; Marriage and Civil Partnership (Scotland) Act 2014 and Civil Partnership Act 2004 (Consequential Provisions and Modifications) Order 2014; Pension Schemes Act 2015; Policing and Crime Act 2017; Marriage (Same-sex Couples) and Civil Partnership (Opposite-sex Couples) (Northern Ireland) Regulations 2019

Status: Amended

Text of statute as originally enacted

Revised text of statute as amended

Text of the Pensions (Increase) Act 1971 as in force today (including any amendments) within the United Kingdom, from legislation.gov.uk.

The Pensions (Increase) Act 1971 (c. 56) is an act of the Parliament of the United Kingdom that replaced the Pensions (Increase) Acts 1920 to 1969 and made further provision for increases and supplements to be paid on certain official pensions.

== Provisions ==
=== Repealed enactments ===
Section 18(1) of the act repealed 20 enactments, listed in schedule 7 to the act.

Consequential repeals
Citation	Short title	Extent of repeal
10 & 11 Geo. 5. c. 36	Pensions (Increase) Act 1920	The whole act.
14 & 15 Geo. 5. c. 32	Pensions (Increase) Act 1924	The whole act.
7 & 8 Geo. 6. c. 21	Pensions (Increase) Act 1944	The whole act.
10 & 11 Geo. 6. c. 7	Pensions (Increase) Act 1947	The whole act.
11 & 12 Geo. 6. c. 24	Police Pensions Act 1948	In Schedule 1, paragraphs 15 and 20.
12, 13 & 14 Geo. 6. c. 44	Superannuation Act 1949	Section 48(1) to (4).
12, 13 & 14 Geo. 6. c. 44	Superannuation Act 1949	Section 62(3).
15 & 16 Geo. 6 & 1 Eliz. 2. c. 45	Pensions (Increase) Act 1952	The whole act.
1 & 2 Eliz. 2. c. 25	Local Government Superannuation Act 1953	In Schedule 4, paragraph 4.
2 & 3 Eliz. 2. c. 25	Pensions (Increase) Act 1954	The whole act.
3 & 4 Eliz. 2. c. 22	Pensions (India, Pakistan and Burma) Act 1955	Section 3(1), except the words preceding paragraph (a) and except paragraph (c).
3 & 4 Eliz. 2. c. 22	Pensions (India, Pakistan and Burma) Act 1955	In Schedule 2, Parts I and II.
4 & 5 Eliz. 2. c. 39	Pensions (Increase) Act 1956	The whole act.
6 & 7 Eliz. 2. c. 64	Local Government and Miscellaneous Financial Provisions (Scotland) Act 1958	In Schedule 4, paragraphs 5 and 19.
7 & 8 Eliz. 2. c. 50	Pensions (Increase) Act 1959	The whole act.
8 & 9 Eliz. 2. c. 9	Judicial Pensions Act 1959	Section 7(1) and (2).
10 & 11 Eliz. 2. c. 30	Northern Ireland Act 1962	Section 26(2).
11 & 12 Eliz. 2. c. 2	Pensions (Increase) Act 1962	The whole act.
1965 c. 11	Ministerial Salaries and Members' Pensions Act 1965	Section 17.
1965 c. 58	Ministerial Salaries Consolidation Act 1965	Section 3(3) from "but" onwards.
1965 c. 78	Pensions (Increase) Act 1965	The whole act.
1969 c. 7	Pensions (Increase) Act 1969	The whole act.

Section 18(5) of the act repealed 16 enactments, listed in the parts I and II of schedule 8 to the act, respectively.

Part I – Outright repeals
Citation	Short title	Extent of repeal
1 & 2 Geo. 6. c. 31	Scottish Land Court Act 1938	Section 1(3).
11 & 12 Geo. 6. c. 26	Local Government Act 1948	In section 140, in subsection (1), the words "the Central Valuation Committee, the Railway Assessment Authority", and subsection (3)(f) with the preceding "and".
11 & 12 Geo. 6. c. 33	Superannuation (Miscellaneous Provisions) Act 1948	Section 13, so far as unrepealed.
8 & 9 Eliz. 2. c. 9	Judicial Pensions Act 1959	Section 3(2).
8 & 9 Eliz. 2. c. 9	Judicial Pensions Act 1959	Section 7(3).
8 & 9 Eliz. 2. c. 9	Judicial Pensions Act 1959	Section 9(3).
1967 c. 73	National Insurance Act 1967	In Schedule 7, paragraph 7.
1969 c. 44	National Insurance Act 1969	Section 10(2).
1969 c. 63	Police Act 1969	Section 5.
1970 c. 51	National Insurance (Old Persons' and Widows' Pensions and Attendance Allowance) Act 1970	Section 8(6).

Part II – Repeals with saving for existing pensions
Citation	Short title	Extent of repeal
8 Edw. 7. c. 38	Irish Universities Act 1908	Section 16(8).
9 & 10 Geo. 5. c. 19	Local Government (Ireland) Act 1919	Section 8.
10 & 11 Geo. 5. c. 67	Government of Ireland Act 1920	Section 9(4).
10 & 11 Geo. 5. c. 67	Government of Ireland Act 1920	Sections 54 and 55.
10 & 11 Geo. 5. c. 67	Government of Ireland Act 1920	Sections 57 to 59.
10 & 11 Geo. 5. c. 67	Government of Ireland Act 1920	In section 68, subsection (1) from the words "or any Act" onwards and subsection (2).
10 & 11 Geo. 5. c. 67	Government of Ireland Act 1920	Schedule 8.
13 Geo. 5. Sess. 2. c. 2	Irish Free State (Consequential Provisions) Act 1922	In Schedule 1, paragraph 7(2).
25 & 26 Geo. 5. c. 23	Superannuation Act 1935	Section 18(2).
12, 13 & 14 Geo. 6. c. 44	Superannuation Act 1949	Section 56.
10 & 11 Eliz. 2. c. 30	Northern Ireland Act 1962	Section 26(1) and (3).
1965 c. 74	Superannuation Act 1965	Section 101.
