= Metropolitan Police Act 1933 =

Act of the Parliament of the United Kingdom

Metropolitan Police Act 1933 (Note: Section 5.)
- Act of Parliament
- Parliament of the United Kingdom
- Long title: An Act to amend the enactments relating to the metropolitan police force in regard to the number of assistant commissioners of police, the age of compulsory retirement, membership of the Police Federation and the appointment of constables for a fixed period of service; to adapt to the case of constables so appointed the enactments relating to police pensions and gratuities, National Health Insurance, and Widows', Orphans' and Old Age Contributory Pensions; and for purposes connected with the matters aforesaid.
- Citation: 23 & 24 Geo. 5. c. 33
- Territorial extent: United Kingdom

Dates
- Royal assent: 18 July 1933
- Commencement: 18 July 1933 (Note: The Acts of Parliament (Commencement) Act 1793.)
- Repealed: 8 July 1986
Other legislation
Amends	Metropolitan Police Act 1856; Police Act 1919; Police Pensions Act 1921
Amended by	National Health Insurance Act 1936; Widows', Orphans' and Old Age Contributory Pensions Act 1936; Police Pensions Act 1948
Repealed by	Drug Trafficking Offences Act 1986

Status: Repealed

Text of statute as originally enacted

The Metropolitan Police Act 1933 (23 & 24 Geo. 5. c. 33) was an act of the Parliament of the United Kingdom. It was largely the brainchild of Hugh Trenchard, who served as Metropolitan Police Commissioner from 1931 to 1935.

Trenchard instigated changes for the improvement of police residences known as section houses, following various reports instigated during 1932. The report proposed sweeping changes and indirectly called into question the reliability of the police in a major emergency. After adverse reactions in the press and questions in Parliament, the Home Secretary Sir John Gilmour stated that Trenchard's report would be published as a white paper, giving MPs an opportunity to debate the issues. In very quick order the white paper was turned into a government bill. The first two clauses of the Bill, which proposed to increase the number of assistant commissioners from four to five and lower the age of retirement for senior officers, did not prove too controversial.

However, the clauses which set out limitations on membership of the Police Federation were hotly debated and characterized by left-wing politicians as "fascist". Additionally, the proposed introduction of ten-year employment terms for some new constables was met with considerable opposition. The bill was enacted in 1933 as the Metropolitan Police Act.

== Bibliography ==
- Browne, Douglas (1956). "Chapter 26. Lord Trenchard". The Rise of Scotland Yard. London: George G Harrap & Co. Ltd.
- Boyle, Andrew (1962). "Chapters 19 Police Reformer and 20 Police Administrator". Trenchard Man of Vision. St James's Place, London: Collins.
- Hirschel, J. David; Wakefield, William O. (1995). Criminal Justice in England and the United States. Westport, Connecticut and London: Greenwood Publishing Group. ISBN 0-275-94133-7.
