= National Insurance Act 1911 =

Act of the Parliament of the United Kingdom

National Insurance Act 1911 (Note: Section 115.)
- Act of Parliament
- Parliament of the United Kingdom
- Long title: An Act to provide for Insurance against Loss of Health and for the Prevention and Cure of Sickness and for Insurance against Unemployment, and for purposes incidental thereto.
- Citation: 1 & 2 Geo. 5. c. 55
- Territorial extent: United Kingdom

Dates
- Royal assent: 16 December 1911
- Commencement: 15 July 1912
- Repealed: England and Wales and Scotland: 23 May 1950; Northern Ireland: 21 December 1954
Other legislation
Amended by	National Insurance Act 1913; National Insurance (Part II. Amendment) Act 1914; National Insurance (Part I. Amendment) Act 1915; National Insurance (Part I. Amendment) Act 1917; National Health Insurance Act 1918; National Health Insurance Act 1919; National Health Insurance Act 1920; National Health Insurance Act 1936
Repealed by	Unemployment Insurance Act 1920; National Health Insurance Act 1924; Public Health Act 1936; Public Health (London) Act 1936; National Health Service (Scotland) Act 1947; Local Government (Scotland) Act 1947; Statute Law Revision Act 1950; Statute Law Revision Act (Northern Ireland) 1954
Relates to	National Health Insurance Act 1922

Status: Repealed

Text of statute as originally enacted

The National Insurance Act 1911 (1 & 2 Geo. 5. c. 55) was an act of the Parliament of the United Kingdom that created National Insurance, originally a system of health insurance for industrial workers in Great Britain based on contributions from employers, the government, and the workers themselves.

It was one of the foundations of the modern welfare state. It provided unemployment insurance for designated cyclical industries. It formed part of the wider social welfare reforms of the Liberal governments of 1906–1915, led by Henry Campbell-Bannerman and H. H. Asquith. David Lloyd George, the Liberal Chancellor of the Exchequer, was the prime moving force behind its design, negotiations with doctors and other interest groups, and final passage, assisted by Home Secretary Winston Churchill.

== Background ==
Lloyd George followed the example of Germany, which under Chancellor Otto von Bismarck had passed the Health Insurance Bill of 1883. After visiting Germany in 1908, Lloyd George said in his 1909 Budget speech that Britain should aim to be "putting ourselves in this field on a level with Germany; we should not emulate them only in armaments." His measure gave the British working classes the first contributory system of insurance against illness and unemployment. The act only applied to wage earners—about 70% of the work force—their families and the unwaged were not covered.

After first praising the proposal, the Conservatives split, and most voted against it. But when returned to office they did not change it.

Some trade unions who operated their own insurance schemes, and friendly societies who had their own schemes, at first opposed the proposal, but Lloyd George convinced most of them to support it. The friendly societies and trade unions were given a major role in administering health insurance. Covered workers outside those agencies dealt with the local post office. The government picked up responsibility for the basic benefits that the unions and societies had promised, thus greatly helping their financial reserves.

The act was psychologically important, as it removed the need for unemployed workers to rely on the stigmatised social welfare provisions of the Poor Law. This hastened the end of the Poor Law as a social welfare provider: the Poor Law Unions were abolished in 1929, and the administration of poor relief was transferred to the counties and county boroughs.

Key figures in the implementation of the act included Robert Laurie Morant and especially economist William John Braithwaite, who drafted the details after inspecting the German system.

The medical profession and the British Medical Association were angry with the law, despite support from some prominent leaders such as Victor Horsley. Some critics on the right such as Hilaire Belloc considered the act to be a manifestation of The Servile State, which Belloc criticised in his book of the same name. The Spectactor opposed the bill, as did the socialist outlet the New Age.

The bill was introduced by Lloyd George to Parliament on 4 May 1911. On the Third Reading, the government was victorious by a huge majority. Most Unionists abstained, although 11 voted against the bill and 9 in favour of it, while the Labour Party was also split, with 32 Labour MPs supporting the government and 5 from the party's socialistic wing voting against. In addition, 58 'Redmonite' Irish voted with the government with 7 O'Brienites against it. It became law on 16 December 1911, and went into effect on 1 July 1912. Collection of contributions began in July 1912, and payments on 15 January 1913.

== Part I, health ==
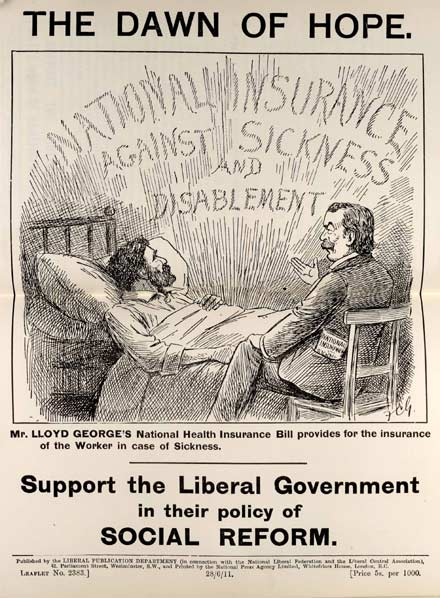
Leaflet promoting the National Insurance Act 1911

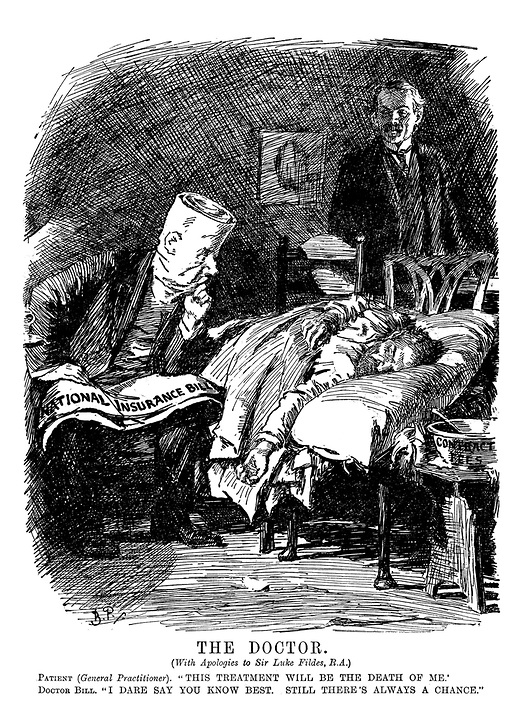
The Doctor by Luke Fildes used in a 1911 Punch cartoon commenting on the effects of the act

Part I of the act provided for a National Insurance scheme with provision of medical benefits. All workers who earned under £160 a year had to pay 4 pence a week to the scheme; the employer paid 3 pence, and general taxation paid 2 pence (Lloyd George called it the "ninepence for fourpence"). Under the act, workers could take sick leave and be paid 10 shillings a week for the first 13 weeks, and 5 shillings a week for the next 13 weeks. Workers also gained access to free treatment for tuberculosis, and the sick were eligible for treatment by a panel doctor. Due to pressure from the Co-operative Women's Guild, the National Insurance Act 1911 provided maternity benefits.

In parts of Scotland whose economy was still largely based on subsistence farming, the collection of cash contributions was impractical. The Highlands and Islands Medical Service was established in the crofting counties on a non-contributory basis in 1913.

Though the fund was held centrally, and the obligation to pay into it was a nationally imposed one, access to the scheme was via "approved societies", who collected the contributions, paid out for treatment, and provided day-to-day administration. A worker could choose which approved society to belong to; this stimulated competition between the societies. The 1911 act only allowed approved societies to collect the contributions of their members; they could not keep the money, but had to forward it to the National Insurance Fund. The societies' own expenditure, such as the cost of treatment for their members, would be reimbursed by the fund, on a six-monthly basis. The government did not reimburse any "improper" payments, such as "treatments" that did not comply with government regulations, or corrupt payments.

Any organisation could become an approved society, as long as it was registered under the act, and complied with the act's obligations, including to operate on a not-for-profit basis. As well as societies created by the trade unions and friendly societies, commercial insurers also established approved societies, such as the National Amalgamated Approved Society (created by Pearl Assurance and others); the largest approved societies were the four operated by Prudential, which collectively looked after 4.3 million members.

Many approved societies were nominally profitable, contributing more to the National Insurance Fund than they took out. In 1925, and then 1931, further acts were passed which reduced the government contribution to the fund: the government pressured the backers of approved societies (the insurance companies, trade unions, and so on) to take on the financial burden themselves. Together with increasing government control on which treatments they were allowed to fund, this led many societies to complain that they had become little more than branches of government, and membership attendance at society meetings dwindled away, becoming virtually non-existent by 1940.

The National Insurance Act 1946 (9 & 10 Geo. 6. c. 67) introduced a single national organisation in the healthcare field (the National Health Service) which, among other things, fulfilled the role of the approved societies; approved societies thus became redundant, and ceased to exist in 1948.

Prior to the 1911 National Insurance Act, health insurance had only been available for certain groups. In 1757, as noted by one study, “a statutory obligation to insure against sickness was imposed on coal-heavers working on the Thames,” and a similar scheme was applied in the coal trade on the Wear in 1792.

== Part II, unemployment ==
Part II of the act provided for time-limited unemployment benefit for certain highly cyclical industries, especially the building trades, mechanical engineering, foundries, vehicle manufacturing, and sawmills. The scheme was based on actuarial principles, and it was planned that it would be funded by fixed payments from workers, employers, and taxpayers. It made no provision for dependants. Part II worked in a similar way to part I. The worker gave 21/2d (i.e pre-decimal pence) per week while employed, the employer 21/2d, and the taxpayer 3d. After one week of unemployment, the worker would start to be eligible to receive 7 shillings (i.e. 84d) per week for up to 15 weeks in a year. The money would be collected from labour exchanges. By 1913, 2.3 million were insured under the scheme for unemployment benefit and almost 15 million insured for sickness benefit.

A key assumption of the act was an unemployment rate of 4.6%. At the time the act was passed, unemployment was at 3% and the fund was expected to quickly build a surplus. Under the act, employees' contributions to the scheme were to be compulsory and taken by the employer before the workers' salary was paid.

== Subsequent developments ==
The act was amended by the National Insurance Act 1913 (3 & 4 Geo. 5. c. 37), draft regulations were published in November 1913.

The whole act was repealed by section 48(3) of the Unemployment Insurance Act 1920 (10 & 11 Geo. 5. c. 30), which came into force on 8 November 1920.

The whole act, except sections 64(1)–(3), 72, 73, 80(3)–(5), 80(13) and 81(14), and the short title in section 115, was repealed by section 133 of, and the seventh schedule to, the National Health Insurance Act 1924 (14 & 15 Geo. 5. c. 38), which came into force on 1 January 1925.

Section 14 of the act was repealed for England and Wales by section 346(1) of, and the fifth part of the third schedule to, the Public Health Act 1936 (26 Geo. 5 & 1 Edw. 8. c. 49), which came into force on 1 October 1937..

Section 64 of the act was repealed for London by section 308 of, and the seventh schedule to, the Public Health (London) Act 1936 (26 Geo. 5 & 1 Edw. 8. c. 50), which came into force on 1 October 1937.

Parts of section 64 and 80 of the act were repealed by Scotland by section 381 of, and the fourteenth schedule to, the Local Government (Scotland) Act 1947 (10 & 11 Geo. 6. c. 65), which came into force on 1 October 1947.

The whole act so far as unrepealed, was repealed, except for Northern Ireland by section 1 of, and the first schedule to, the Statute Law Revision Act 1950 (14 Geo. 6. c. 6), which came into force on 23 May 1950.

The whole act, so far as unrepealed, was repealed for Northern Ireland by section 1 of, and the schedule to, the Statute Law Revision Act (Northern Ireland) 1954 (c. 35 (N.I.), which came into force on 21 December 1954.

== See also ==
- Old Age Pensions Act 1908
- Timeline of pensions in the United Kingdom
- Beveridge Report 1942
- National Health Service Act 1946
- Universal health care
- Unemployment Insurance Act 1920 expanded coverage of part II

== Bibliography ==
- BMA (1913). "Regulations For Medical Benefit. Text Of The New Draft Regulations". The British Medical Journal. 2 (2759): 401–420. JSTOR 25307868.
- Alborn, Timothy. "Senses of belonging: The politics of working-class insurance in Britain, 1880–1914." Journal of modern history 73.3 (2001): 561-602. in JSTOR
- Boyer, George R. "The evolution of unemployment relief in Great Britain." Journal of Interdisciplinary History 34.3 (2004): 393-433. online
- Briggs, Asa. "The welfare state in historical perspective." European Journal of Sociology 2#2 (1961): 221-258.
- Carpenter, Glyn. "National Health Insurance: A Case Study in the Use of Private Non-Profit Making Organizations in the Provision of Welfare Benefits." Public Administration 62.1 (1984): 71-89.
- Clarke, Orme (1912). The National Insurance Act 1911. London: Butterworth & Co.
- Cordery, Simon (2003). British Friendly Societies, 1750-1914. Palgrave Macmillan. ISBN 0-333-99031-5.
- Fraser, Derek (2009). The Evolution of the British Welfare State: A History of Social Policy since the Industrial Revolution (Fourth ed.). Palgrave Macmillan. ISBN 978-0-230-22466-7.
- Gazeley, Ian (2003). Poverty in Britain, 1900-1965. Social History in Perspective. Palgrave Macmillan. ISBN 0-333-71619-1.
- Gilbert, Bentley B. (1965). "The British National Insurance Act of 1911 and the Commercial Insurance Lobby". Journal of British Studies. 4 (2). Cambridge University Press for The North American Conference on British Studies: 127–148. doi:10.1086/385503. JSTOR 175149. S2CID 146299988.
- Gilbert, Bentley B. The evolution of national insurance in Great Britain: the origins of the welfare state (1966). pp 289–447. the standard scholarly monograph.
- Grigg, John (1978). Lloyd George: The People's Champion 1902-1911. London: Eyre Methuen. ISBN 0-413-32620-9.
- Hay, J. R. (1990). The Origins of the Liberal Welfare Reforms 1906–1914 (PDF). Studies in Economic and Social History (Revised ed.). Macmillan Education Ltd. ISBN 0-333-36000-1.
- Hay, Roy. "Employers and social policy in Britain: The evolution of welfare legislation, 1905–14∗." Social History 2.4 (1977): 435-455.
- Heller, Michael. "The National Insurance Acts 1911–1947, the Approved Societies and the Prudential Assurance Company." Twentieth Century British History 19.1 (2008): 1-28. doi:10.1093/tcbh/hwm032
- Hennock, E. P. (2007). The Origin of the Welfare State in England and Germany, 1850-1914: Social Policies Compared. Cambridge University Press. ISBN 978-0-521-59212-3.
- Loch, C. S. "National Insurance Act, 1911." Charity Organisation Review 31.186 (1912): 312-316. in JSTOR
- McFall, Liz. "Pragmatics and Politics: the case of industrial assurance in the UK." Journal of Cultural Economy 3.2 (2010): 205-223.
- Simkin, John (January 2020). "1911 National Insurance Act". Spartacus Educational.
- Sokolovsky, Joan. "The making of national health insurance in Britain and Canada: institutional analysis and its limits." Journal of Historical Sociology 11.2 (1998): 247-280.
- Whiteside, Noelle. "Welfare insurance and casual labour: a study of administrative intervention in industrial employment, 1906–26." Economic History Review 32.4 (1979): 507-522. in JSTOR
- UK statutes (1913), "37" (PDF), National Insurance Act
