= Police Pensions Act 1948 =

Act of the Parliament of the United Kingdom

Police Pensions Act 1948 (Note: Section 9(1).)
- Act of Parliament
- Parliament of the United Kingdom
- Long title: An Act to make provision as to the pensions to be paid to and in respect of members of police forces and as to the length of the period of their service, to amend and repeal with savings certain statutory provisions relating to the pensions to be paid to and in respect of members of police forces and as to the length of their service, and for purposes connected with the matters aforesaid.
- Citation: 11 & 12 Geo. 6. c. 24
- Territorial extent: England and Wales; Scotland; (Note: Section 9(3).)

Dates
- Royal assent: 24 March 1948
- Commencement: 24 March 1948 (Note: The Acts of Parliament (Commencement) Act 1793.)
- Repealed: 22 July 1976
Other legislation
Amends	See § Repealed enactments
Repeals/revokes	See § Repealed enactments
Amended by	Pensions (Increase) Act 1971
Repealed by	Police Pensions Act 1976

Status: Repealed

Text of statute as originally enacted

The Police Pensions Act 1948 (11 & 12 Geo. 6. c. 24) was an act of the Parliament of the United Kingdom that made provision for the pensions to be paid to and in respect of members of police forces in Great Britain, consolidating and repealing earlier statutory provisions relating to police pensions.

== Provisions ==
=== Repealed enactments ===
Section 3(4) of the act repealed 20 enactments and 7 instruments, listed in parts I and II of the first schedule to the act, respectively.

Part I – Acts repealed
Citation	Short title	Extent of repeal
10 Geo. 4. c. 44	Metropolitan Police Act 1829	In section twelve, the words "or as a compensation for wounds or severe injuries received in the performance of their duty, or as an allowance to such of them as shall be disabled by bodily injury received, or shall be worn out by length of service".
22 & 23 Vict. c. 32	County and Borough Police Act 1859	Section twenty-two.
28 & 29 Vict. c. 35	Police Superannuation Act 1865	The whole act.
51 & 52 Vict. c. ix	Lincolnshire Police Superannuation Act 1888	Sections four and five.
4 & 5 Geo. 5. c. 34	Police Reservists (Allowances) Act 1914	Subsection (2) of section one.
4 & 5 Geo. 5. c. 80	Police Constables (Naval and Military Service) Act 1914	The whole act.
5 & 6 Geo. 5. c. 41	Police (Emergency Provisions) Act 1915	The whole act.
8 & 9 Geo. 5. c. 51	Police (Pensions) Act 1918	The whole act.
9 & 10 Geo. 5. c. 46	Police Act 1919	In subsection (1) of section four the word "pensions"; section five; and in section fourteen the word "pensions".
10 & 11 Geo. 5. c. xxvii	City of London (Various Powers) Act 1920	Sections twelve and thirteen.
11 & 12 Geo. 5. c. 31	Police Pensions Act 1921	The whole act except so much of section thirty as precedes the provisos thereto, subsection (1) of section thirty-five and the Third Schedule.
16 & 17 Geo. 5. c. 34	Police Pensions Act 1926	The whole act.
23 & 24 Geo. 5. c. 33	Metropolitan Police Act 1933	Section two and subsection (2) of section four.
2 & 3 Geo. 6. c. 103	Police and Firemen (War Service) Act 1939	In section two, the words "police force or", in both places where those words occur, the words "constable or" wherever those words occur, and the words "sections nine and twenty of the Police Pensions Act, 1921 and"; in section three the words "constable or" wherever those words occur; subsection (1) of section four; in subsection (3) of section four, the words "police force or", the words "constable or" wherever those words occur, and the words "in the case of a constable, by an injury received in the execution of his duty as a constable without his own default and"; in subsection (4) of section four, the words "constable or" in both places where those words occur, and paragraph (i); in subsection (5) of section four, the words "(1) or", the words "constable or" in both places where those words occur and the words "subsection (1) or"; in section five, the words "constable or" in both places where those words occur; subsection (1) of section six; in subsection (2) of section ten the words "police force or", wherever those words occur, and the words "constable or"; in section eleven, the words "the Police Pensions Act, 1921 and"; in subsection (3) of section thirteen the words "constable or", wherever those words occur; and in section fourteen, in the definition of "appropriate pension enactment", the words "in relation to a person who has ceased to serve as a constable, means the Police Pensions Act, 1921, as amended by any subsequent enactment and".
7 & 8 Geo. 6. c. 21	Pensions (Increase) Act 1944	Paragraph 2 of Part II of the First Schedule.
7 & 8 Geo. 6. c. 22	Police and Firemen (War Service) Act 1944	In subsection (1) of section one (which substitutes a new section four for section four of the Police and Firemen (War Service) Act, 1939) the same words as are specified in paragraph 14 of this Part of this Schedule in relation to section four; in subsection (1) of section two the words "(1) or" and the words "constable or"; in subsection (2) of section two the words "constable or"; paragraph (a) of subsection (3) of section two; in subsection (1) of section three, the words "(1) and"; in subsection (3) of section three the words "police force or" and the words "constable or"; in subsection (1) of section four the words "constable or"; in section five the words "police force or" wherever those words occur and the words "constable or"; in subsection (2) of section six the words "constables or" in both places where they occur.
9 & 10 Geo. 6. c. 17	Police (Overseas Service) Act 1945	In subsection (2) of section one the words from "and may" to the end of the subsection; subsections (3) and (4) of the said section one; in subsection (1) of section two the words "subject to the provisions of any regulations made under section one of this Act" and the words "the Police Pensions Act, 1921, and of".
9 & 10 Geo. 6. c. 46	Police Act 1946	Paragraphs (b) and (c) of, and the proviso to, subsection (3) of section eleven, and subsections (4) and (5) of that section; paragraph 10 of the Second Schedule; and in the Third Schedule, paragraph 3 and sub-paragraph (2) of paragraph 5.
9 & 10 Geo. 6. c. 71	Police (Scotland) Act 1946	Paragraphs (b) and (c) of, and the proviso to, subsection (2) of section seven, and subsections (3) and (4) of that section; paragraph 7 of the First Schedule; and paragraphs 3 and 4 of the Third Schedule.
10 & 11 Geo. 6. c. 7	Pensions (Increase) Act 1947	Subsection (3) of section two.

Part II – Rules and regulations repealed
Title	Extent of repeal
Police War Reserve Rules 1945	Rule 31.
Police War Reserve (Scotland) Rules 1945	Rule 35.
Women's Auxiliary Police Corps Rules 1945	Part VII.
Women's Auxiliary Police Corps (Scotland) Rules 1945	Part VII.
Police (Overseas Service) (Germany) Regulations 1947	Part II and the Second Schedule.
Police (Overseas Service) (Austria) Regulations 1947	Part II and the Second Schedule.
Police (Overseas Service) (Greece) Regulations 1948	Part II and the Second Schedule.

Section 9(2) of the act repealed 2 enactments, listed in the second schedule to the act.

Enactments repealed as from the passing of the act
Citation	Short title	Extent of repeal
11 & 12 Geo. 5. c. 31	Police Pensions Act 1921	Section fifteen and paragraph (a) of subsection (1) of section seventeen.
23 & 24 Geo. 5. c. 33	Metropolitan Police Act 1933	Subsection (1) of section four.

== Subsequent developments ==
The whole act was repealed by section 13(2) of, and schedule 3 to, the Police Pensions Act 1976, which came into force on 22 July 1976.
