= National Health Insurance Act 1924 =

Act of the Parliament of the United Kingdom

National Health Insurance Act 1924 (Note: Section 134(1).)
- Act of Parliament
- Parliament of the United Kingdom
- Long title: An Act to consolidate the enactments relating to National Health Insurance.
- Citation: 14 & 15 Geo. 5. c. 38
- Territorial extent: United Kingdom

Dates
- Royal assent: 7 August 1924
- Commencement: 1 January 1925 (Note: Section 134(2).)
- Repealed: 1 January 1937
Other legislation
Amends	See § Repealed enactments
Repeals/revokes	See § Repealed enactments
Amended by	Poor Law Act 1927; National Health Insurance Act 1928; National Health Insurance (Prolongation of Insurance) Act 1930; National Health Insurance (Prolongation of Insurance) Act 1931; Local Government Act 1933
Repealed by	National Health Insurance Act 1936

Status: Repealed

Text of statute as originally enacted

The National Health Insurance Act 1924 (14 & 15 Geo. 5. c. 38) was an act of the Parliament of the United Kingdom that consolidated enactments relating to national health insurance in the United Kingdom.

== Provisions ==
=== Repealed enactments ===
Section 133 of the act repealed 14 enactments, listed in the seventh schedule to the act.

Citation	Short title	Extent of repeal
1 & 2 Geo. 5. c. 55	National Insurance Act 1911	The whole act, except subsections (1), (2), and (3) of section sixty-four, sections seventy-two and seventy-three, paragraphs (3), (4), (5), (12) and (13) of section eighty, paragraph (14) of section eighty-one, and the short title in section one hundred and fifteen.
3 & 4 Geo. 5. c. 37	National Insurance Act 1913	The whole act, except section one, subsections (1), (3), and (4) of section forty-one, and so much of subsection (2) of that section as relates to expenses defrayed in the exercise of any power of dealing with tuberculosis or other disease, subsection (2) of section forty-two, and subsection (1) of section forty-three.
5 & 6 Geo. 5. c. 29	National Insurance (Part I. Amendment) Act 1915	The whole act.
5 & 6 Geo. 5. c. 96	Government War Obligations Act 1915	Section three.
7 & 8 Geo. 5. c. 16	National Insurance (Part I. Amendment) Act 1917	The whole act.
7 & 8 Geo. 5. c. 62	National Health Insurance Act 1918	The whole act.
8 & 9 Geo. 5. c. 55	School Teachers (Superannuation) Act 1918	Section seventeen.
9 & 10 Geo. 5. c. 20	Scottish Board of Health Act 1919	In subsection (1) of section four, the words from "And provided also" to the end of the subsection.
9 & 10 Geo. 5. c. 21	Ministry of Health Act 1919	Proviso (ii) to subsection (1) of section three and section nine.
9 & 10 Geo. 5. c. 36	National Health Insurance Act 1919	The whole act.
10 & 11 Geo. 5. c. 10	National Health Insurance Act 1920	The whole act, except subsection (4) of section two and subsection (1) of section twenty-one.
11 & 12 Geo. 5. c. 25	National Health Insurance Act 1921	The whole act.
12 & 13 Geo. 5. c. 38	National Health Insurance Act 1922	Section two.
14 & 15 Geo. 5. c. 16 (N.I.)	National Health Insurance Act (Northern Ireland) 1924	Sections three and four.

== Subsequent developments ==
The whole act was repealed by section 228 of, and part I of the sixth schedule to, the National Health Insurance Act 1936 (26 Geo. 5 & 1 Edw. 8. c. 32), which came into operation on 1 January 1937.
