= Police Act 1919 =

Act of the Parliament of the United Kingdom

Police Act 1919 (Note: Section 15(1).)
- Act of Parliament
- Parliament of the United Kingdom
- Long title: An Act to amend the Law relating to the Police in Great Britain.
- Citation: 9 & 10 Geo. 5. c. 46
- Territorial extent: England and Wales; Scotland; (Note: Section 15(2).)

Dates
- Royal assent: 15 August 1919
- Commencement: 15 August 1919 (Note: The Acts of Parliament (Commencement) Act 1793.)
- Repealed: 1 April 1965 (Note: The Police Act 1964 (Commencement No. 1) Order 1964 (SI 1964/873).)
Other legislation
Amended by	Police Pensions Act 1921; Metropolitan Police Act 1933; Police Pensions Act 1948; Police (Scotland) Act 1956
Repealed by	Police Act 1964
Relates to	Constabulary and Police (Ireland) Act 1919

Status: Repealed

Text of statute as originally enacted

The Police Act 1919 (9 & 10 Geo. 5. c. 46) was an act of the Parliament of the United Kingdom which set up an alternative dispute resolution system within UK labour law for collective disputes involving members of staff in the police force. The current rules are now found under the Police Act 1996. Following the British police strikes in 1918 and 1919, the government decided that it was a threat to the public to allow strikes among the police force to take place. The act prohibited police from joining a trade union that could take strike action protected by the Trade Disputes Act 1906 (6 Edw. 7. c. 47), and provided an alternative in the Police Federation of England and Wales and the Scottish Police Federation. A substitute for strikes was binding arbitration to resolve collective disputes.

== Subsequent developments ==
Sections 3, 4 and 10 of the act were repealed for Scotland by section 38(1) of, and the third schedule to, the Police (Scotland) Act 1956 (4 & 5 Eliz. 2. c. 26), which came into force on 1 January 1957.

The whole act was repealed by section 64(3) of, and part II of schedule 10 to, the Police Act 1964, which came into force on 1 August 1964.

== See also ==
- United Kingdom labour law
- Police Act 1996

== Bibliography ==
- "The Police Act, 1919". Halsbury's Statutes of England. (The Complete Statutes of England). Butterworth & Co (Publishers) Ltd. London. 1930. Volume 12: . Page 867 et seq.
- Roland Burrows (ed). "The Police Act, 1919". Halsbury's Statutes of England. Second Edition. Butterworth & Co (Publishers) Ltd. London. 1950. Volume 18. Page 122 et seq.
- "Police Act, 1919". Chitty's Statutes of Practical Utility. Sweet & Maxwell. Stevens and Sons. London. 1920. Volume 20. Part I. Sixth Edition, Ninth Annual Continuation Volume. Page 353 et seq.
- W de Bracy Herbert (ed). "Police Act, 1919". The Practical Statutes of the Session 1919. The Field Press Ltd. Windsor House, Bream's Buildings, London. 1920. Page 176 et seq. Google
- W H Dumsday. "Police Act, 1919". Local Government Law and Legislation, 1919. Hadden, Best and Co. 1920. Page 354. Google.
- Macmorran and Willis. "The Police Act, 1919". Local Government, 1919. Butterworth & Co. 1920. Page 438 to 444. Google
- Vester and Gardner. "Police Act, 1919". Trade Union Law and Practice. Sweet and Maxwell. London. 1958. Pages 233 to 237. Google
- Slesser and Baker. Trade Union Law. Nisbet & Co. Second Edition. 1926. Page 277. Third Edition. Reprinted. 1978. Pages 171 and 343.
