= List of statutory rules and orders of Northern Ireland, 1928 =

This is an incomplete list of statutory rules and orders of Northern Ireland during 1928. Statutory rules and orders were the predecessor of statutory rules and they formed the secondary legislation of Northern Ireland between 1922 and 1973.

Number	Title
No. 1 - 3	
No. 4	The Gas, Rate of Payment Order (Northern Ireland) 1928
No. 5 & 6	
No. 7	The County Surveyors Qualification Order (Northern Ireland) 1928
No. 8	
No. 9	The Lead Paint (Protection against Poisoning) Order (Northern Ireland) 1928
No. 10 - 15	
No. 16	The Probation Rules (Northern Ireland) 1928
No. 17	
No. 18	The Civil Service (Approved Associations) Regulations (Northern Ireland) 1928
No. 19	The Vehicle Painting Regulations (Northern Ireland) 1928
No. 20 & 21	
No. 22	The Housing Grant Rules (Northern Ireland) 1928
No. 23	The Residuary Share Suspense Account Regulations (Northern Ireland) 1928
No. 24 - 26	
No. 27	The Licensing Registration Regulations (Northern Ireland) 1928
No. 28	The Lights on Bicycles Regulations (Northern Ireland) 1928
No. 29 & 30	
No. 31	The Public Service Vehicles (Amendment) Regulations (Northern Ireland) 1928
No. 32	The Entertainments Duty, Authorised Officers Order (Northern Ireland) 1928
No. 33	The Resident Magistrates (Salaries and Allowances) Order (Northern Ireland) 1928
No. 34	The Secondary Teachers 1926, Amendment Regulations (Northern Ireland) 1928
No. 35	The Contributory Pensions (Calculation of Contributions) Amendment Regulations (Northern Ireland) 1928
No. 36	The National Health Insurance and Contributory Pensions (Collection of Conts) Amendment Regulations (Northern Ireland) 1928
No. 37	The First-aid Order (Northern Ireland) 1928
No. 38	The Unemployment Insurance (Residence Condition) Regulations (Northern Ireland) 1928
No. 39	The Jury: Remuneration and Expenses of Clerks of the Peace, &c. Order (Northern Ireland) 1928
No. 40	
No. 41	The Staffing Public Elementary Schools Regulations (Northern Ireland) 1928
No. 42	
No. 43	The Fertilisers and Feeding Stuffs Regulations (Northern Ireland) 1928
No. 44	The Self-Indicating Weighing Machines Regulations (Northern Ireland) 1928
No. 45 & 46	
No. 47	The Contributory Pensions and Unemployment Insurance (Collection of Contributions Pensions over 65) Regulations (Northern Ireland) 1928
No. 48	The Old Age Pensions (Transitional Arrangements) Order (Northern Ireland) 1928
No. 49	The Foot-and-Mouth Disease (Emergency Restrictions) Order (Northern Ireland) 1928
No. 50 - 55	
No. 56	The Motor Car (Licensing of Drivers) Amendment Regulations (Northern Ireland) 1928
No. 57	The Legitimacy (Re-registration of Births) Regulations (Northern Ireland) 1928
No. 58	The Sacks (Cleaning and Repairing) Welfare Order (Northern Ireland) 1928
No. 59	The Fertilisers and Feeding Stuffs, Appointed day Order (Northern Ireland) 1928
No. 60	The County Court, Conditions of Service Order (Northern Ireland) 1928
No. 61	The Unemployment Insurance (Exempt Persons) Regulations (Northern Ireland) 1928
No. 62 - 64	
No. 65	The Swine Fever (Belfast) No. 2 Order (Northern Ireland) 1928
No. 66	The Acquisition of Land (Assessment of Compensation) Rules (Northern Ireland) 1928
No. 67	The Acquisition of Land (Assessment of Compensation) Fees Rules (Northern Ireland) 1928
No. 68	
No. 69	The King's Scholarship Examinations Regulations (Northern Ireland) 1928
No. 70	The Royal Ulster Constabulary: Pensions Order (Northern Ireland) 1928
No. 71	The Civil Service: Superannuation Order (Northern Ireland) 1928
No. 72	The Roads Improvement Regulations (Northern Ireland) 1928
No. 73	The Unemployment Insurance (Insurance Year) Regulations (Northern Ireland) 1928
No. 74	The Unemployment Insurance (Periods of Incapacity) Regulations (Northern Ireland) 1928
No. 75	The Unemployment Insurance (Review of Claims) Regulations (Northern Ireland) 1928
No. 76 & 77	
No. 78	The Housing Grant (Amendment) Rules (Northern Ireland) 1928
No. 79 & 80	
No. 81	The National Health and Unemployment Insurance (Stamps) Regulations (Northern Ireland) 1928
No. 82	
No. 83	The Petty Sessions Clerks' Salaries Order (Northern Ireland) 1928
No. 84	The Superannuation and other Trust Funds (Fees) Regulations (Northern Ireland) 1928
No. 85	
No. 86	The Unemployment Insurance (Benefit) (Amendment) Regulations (Northern Ireland) 1928
No. 87	The Game Certificates and Licences and Gun Licences Order (Northern Ireland) 1928
No. 88	The Foreign Animals Order (Northern Ireland) 1928
No. 89	The National Health Insurance (Deposit Contributors) Amendment Regulations (Northern Ireland) 1928
No. 90	The National Health Insurance and Contributory Pensions (Voluntary Contributors) Amendment Regulations (Northern Ireland) 1928
No. 91	
No. 92	The Trade Boards (Retail Bespoke Tailoring) Regulations (Northern Ireland) 1928
No. 93	The Trade Boards (Dressmaking and Women's Light Clothing) Regulations (Northern Ireland) 1928
No. 94 & 95	
No. 96	The Unemployment Insurance (Courts of Referees) Regulations (Northern Ireland) 1928
No. 97	
No. 98	The Intoxicating Liquor, Licences: Rates of Charges Order (Northern Ireland) 1928
No. 99 & 100	
No. 101	The Parliamentary Grant (Education Authorities) Regulations (Northern Ireland) 1928
No. 102	The Public Elementary School Classes in Centres of Technical Instruction Regulations (Northern Ireland) 1928
No. 103	The Evening Elementary School Regulations (Northern Ireland) 1928
No. 104	The Government Chemist Regulations (Northern Ireland) 1928
No. 105	
No. 106	The Technical Teachers, 1926, Amendment Regulations No. 4 (Northern Ireland) 1928
No. 107	The Secondary Teachers, 1926, Amendment Regulations No. 4 (Northern Ireland) 1928
No. 108	The Foot-and-Mouth Disease (Importation of Animals and Poultry) Order (Northern Ireland) 1928
No. 109	The Licensing (Valuation) Regulations (Northern Ireland) 1928
No. 110	The Road Fund Regulations (Northern Ireland) 1928
No. 111 & 112	
No. 113	The Fisheries: Salmon and Freshwater By-Laws (Northern Ireland) 1928
No. 114	
No. 115	The Weights and Measures (Fees) Order (Northern Ireland) 1928
No. 116	
No. 117	The Industrial Assurance (Amendment of Fees) Regulations (Northern Ireland) 1928
No. 118	The Industrial Assurance (Individual Transfer) Regulations (Northern Ireland) 1928
No. 119	The Pharmacy and Poisons Regulations (Northern Ireland) 1928
No. 120	The Dangerous Drugs: Appointed day Order (Northern Ireland) 1928
No. 121	
No. 122	The National Health Insurance (Extension of Enactments) Order (Northern Ireland) 1928
No. 123	The Unemployment Insurance (Insurance Industry Special Scheme) (Variation and Amendment) Special Order (Northern Ireland) 1928
No. 124 & 125	
No. 126	The Roads Improvement (Adaptation of Enactments) Regulations (Northern Ireland) 1928
No. 127	The Public Service Vehicles (Amendment) (No. 2) Regulations (Northern Ireland) 1928
No. 128	
No. 129	The Importation of Dogs (Ireland) Order 1902, Amendment Order (Northern Ireland) 1928
No. 130	The Rating and Valuation (Apportionment) Rules (Northern Ireland) 1928
No. 131	The Malone Training School Regulations (Northern Ireland) 1928
No. 132	The Non-Contributory Old Age Pensions Regulations (Northern Ireland) 1928
No. 133	The National Health Insurance: Contractors for Manual Labour (Exclusion) Order (Northern Ireland) 1928
No. 134	The Public Health (Preservatives, etc. in Food) Amendment Regulations (Northern Ireland) 1928
No. 135	The Marketing of Potatoes Rules (Northern Ireland) 1928
No. 136	The Unemployment Insurance (Associations) Regulations (Northern Ireland) 1928

== See also ==
- List of statutory rules of Northern Ireland
