= List of statutory rules and orders of Northern Ireland, 1932 =

This is an incomplete list of statutory rules and orders of Northern Ireland during 1932. Statutory rules and orders were the predecessor of statutory rules and they formed the secondary legislation of Northern Ireland between 1922 and 1973.

| Number | Title |
|---|---|
| No. 1 - 3 | |
| No. 4 | The Black Scab in Potatoes Order (Northern Ireland) 1932 |
| No. 5 | |
| No. 6 | The Marketing of Dairy Produce Amendment Rules (Northern Ireland) 1932 |
| No. 7 | The Electricity (Confirmation of Special Orders) Rules (Northern Ireland) 1932 |
| No. 8 | The Prevention of Accidents Rules (Northern Ireland) 1932 |
| No. 9 & 10 | |
| No. 11 | The Road Vehicles (Part-year Licensing) Order (Northern Ireland) 1932 |
| No. 12 | The Foreign Hay and Straw (Ireland) Amendment Order (Northern Ireland) 1932 |
| No. 13 | |
| No. 14 | The Removal of Unsightly and Dilapidated Structures Regulations (Northern Ireland) 1932 |
| No. 15 | |
| No. 16 | The Trade Scholarships Amendment Regulations No. 2 (Northern Ireland) 1932 |
| No. 17 | The National Health Insurance (Exempt Persons) Amendment Regulations (Northern Ireland) 1932 |
| No. 18 | The Marketing of Eggs (Amendment) Rules (Northern Ireland) 1932 |
| No. 19 | The Meat Regulations Act County Court Rules (Northern Ireland) 1932 |
| No. 20 | The Electricity Supply (County Court) Rules (Northern Ireland) 1932 |
| No. 21 - 28 | |
| No. 29 | The National Health Insurance (Disposal of Balances) Regulations (Northern Ireland) 1932 |
| No. 30 | The Unemployment Insurance (Subsidiary Employments) Order (Northern Ireland) 1932 |
| No. 31 | The Secondary School Examinations Amendment Regulations No. 1 (Northern Ireland) 1932 |
| No. 32 | The Sheep Dipping Order (Northern Ireland) 1932 |
| No. 33 | The Fisheries: Coarse Fish, Lough Erne Bye-Law (Northern Ireland) 1932 |
| No. 34 | |
| No. 35 | The Transit of Animals (Amendment) Order (Northern Ireland) 1932 |
| No. 36 | The Unemployment Insurance (Insurance Industry Special Scheme) (Amendment) (No. 2) Special Order (Northern Ireland) 1932 |
| No. 37 | The Unemployment Insurance (Transitional Payments) (Amendment) Regulations (Northern Ireland) 1932 |
| No. 38 | |
| No. 39 | The Public Health: Appointment of Sanitary Officers Order (Northern Ireland) 1932 |
| No. 40 | The Unemployment Insurance (Economy) Order (Northern Ireland) 1932 |
| No. 41 | The National Health Insurance (Subsidiary Employments) Amendment Order (Northern Ireland) 1932 |
| No. 42 | The Technical Teachers Regulations (Northern Ireland) 1932 |
| No. 43 | The National Health Insurance (Deposit Contributors) Amendment Regulations (Northern Ireland) 1932 |
| No. 44 & 45 | |
| No. 46 | The Drainage (Notice to Cleanse Water-courses) Order (Northern Ireland) 1932 |
| No. 47 | The Technical Attendance Grants Regulations (Northern Ireland) 1932 |
| No. 48 | |
| No. 49 | The Electricity (Adjustment of price according to Power Factor) Regulations (Northern Ireland) 1932 |
| No. 50 | The Marketing of Dairy Produce Amendment No. 2 Rules (Northern Ireland) 1932 |
| No. 51 | The Public Service Vehicles (Amendment) Regulations (Northern Ireland) 1932 |
| No. 52 & 53 | |
| No. 54 | The Agricultural Produce (Meat Regulations) Appointed day Order (Northern Ireland) 1932 |
| No. 55 | The Marketing of Fruit (Appointed day) Order (Northern Ireland) 1932 |
| No. 56 | The Public Health: Appointment of Sanitary Officers Order (Northern Ireland) 1932 |
| No. 57 | The Public Health: Appointment of Sanitary Officers Order (Northern Ireland) 1932 |
| No. 58 | The Public Health: Appointment of Sanitary Officers Order (Northern Ireland) 1932 |
| No. 59 & 60 | |
| No. 61 | The Sheep Dipping Amendment Order No. 2 (Northern Ireland) 1932 |
| No. 62 | |
| No. 63 | The Housing Grant Rules (Northern Ireland) 1932 |
| No. 64 | The Anthrax Order (Northern Ireland) 1932 |
| No. 65 | The Contributory Pensions (Oversea Voluntary Contributors) Amendment Regulations (Northern Ireland) 1932 |
| No. 66 | The National Health Insurance (Deposit Contributors) Amendment (No. 2) Regulations (Northern Ireland) 1932 |
| No. 67 | |
| No. 68 | The Public Service Vehicles (Construction) Regulations (Northern Ireland) 1932 |
| No. 69 | |
| No. 70 | The Contributory Pensions (Modification of Old Age Pensions) Regulations (Northern Ireland) 1932 |
| No. 71 | The Royal Ulster Constabulary Pay (New Entrants) (Temporary Provisions) Order (Northern Ireland) 1932 |
| No. 72 | The National Health Insurance and Contributory Pensions (Voluntary Contributors) Regulations (Northern Ireland) 1932 |
| No. 73 | The International Motor Race (Badge) Order (Northern Ireland) 1932 |
| No. 74 | The Importation of Wrapping Materials Order (Northern Ireland) 1932 |
| No. 75 | The Ulster Savings Certificates (Amendment) Regulations (Northern Ireland) 1932 |
| No. 76 | The Rates of Interest (Housing) Order (Northern Ireland) 1932 |
| No. 77 | The Workmen's Compensation (Cataract) Order (Northern Ireland) 1932 |
| No. 78 | |
| No. 79 | The Poor Law: Duties of Midwives Order (Northern Ireland) 1932 |
| No. 80 - 82 | |
| No. 83 | The Land Law: Authentication of Seal of Ministry of Finance Order (Northern Ireland) 1932 |
| No. 84 | The Local Government: Freight Rebates Order (Northern Ireland) 1932 |
| No. 85 & 86 | |
| No. 87 | The Weights and Measures (Amendment No. 2) Regulations (Northern Ireland) 1932 |
| No. 88 | The National Health Insurance and Contributory Pensions (Enactments) Order (Northern Ireland) 1932 |
| No. 89 | The Intoxicating Liquor Licences: Rates of Charges Order (Northern Ireland) 1932 |
| No. 90 | The Contributory Pensions (Calculation of Contributions) Regulations (Northern Ireland) 1932 |
| No. 91 | The Contributory Pensions (Exempt and Excepted Persons) Consolidated Regulations (Northern Ireland) 1932 |
| No. 92 | The Superannuation: Prison Officers Order (Northern Ireland) 1932 |
| No. 93 | The Malone Training School Officers Superannuation Order (Northern Ireland) 1932 |
| No. 94 | The Criminal Lunatic Asylum Officers Superannuation Order (Northern Ireland) 1932 |
| No. 95 | |
| No. 96 | The Contributory Pensions (Claims and Payment) Amendment Regulations (Northern Ireland) 1932 |
| No. 97 | The Fertilisers and Feeding Stuffs Regulations (Northern Ireland) 1932 |
| No. 98 | The New Industries (Development) Regulations (Northern Ireland) 1932 |
| No. 99 | |
| No. 100 | The Motor Cars (Third Party Risks) (Amendment) Regulations (Northern Ireland) 1932 |
| No. 101 | The Mental Treatment Regulations (Northern Ireland) 1932 |
| No. 102 | The Building (Amendment) Regulations (Northern Ireland) 1932 |
| No. 103 & 104 | |
| No. 105 | The Insurance and Contributory Pensions (Collection of Contributions) Regulations (Northern Ireland) 1932 |
| No. 106 | The National Health Insurance (Approved Societies) Amendment Regulations (No. 4) (Northern Ireland) 1932 |
| No. 107 | The National Health Insurance Medical Benefit (Amendment) Regulations (Northern Ireland) 1932 |
| No. 108 | |
| No. 109 | The Parliamentary Grant (Education Authorities) Regulations (Northern Ireland) 1932 |
| No. 110 | The Mental Treatment (Registration of Institutions and Houses) Fees Regulations (Northern Ireland) 1932 |
| No. 111 | |
| No. 112 | The Foreign Animals No. 3 Order (Northern Ireland) 1932 |
| No. 113 | The Instruction of Public Elementary School Pupils in Extra and Special Subjects Regulations (Northern Ireland) 1932 |
| No. 114 | |
| No. 115 | The Transit of Animals (Amendment) Order No. 2 (Northern Ireland) 1932 |
| No. 116 | |
| No. 117 | The Local Government: Procedure of Councils Order (Northern Ireland) 1932 |
| No. 118 | |
| No. 119 | The Electricity (South-Eastern Area Development) Regulations (Northern Ireland) 1932 |
| No. 120 | The Dangerous Drugs Amendment Regulations (Northern Ireland) 1932 |
| No. 121 - 123 | |
| No. 124 | The Companies (Fees) Order (Northern Ireland) 1932 |
| No. 125 | The Companies (Forms) Order (Northern Ireland) 1932 |
| No. 126 | The National Health Insurance (Outworkers) Amendment Order (Northern Ireland) 1932 |
| No. 127 | The Contributory Pensions (Mercantile Marine) Consolidated Order (Northern Ireland) 1932 |
| No. 128 | The Unemployment Insurance (Subsidiary Employments) Order (Northern Ireland) 1932 |
| No. 129 - 132 | |
| No. 133 | The Rates of Interest (Housing No. 2) Order (Northern Ireland) 1932 |
| No. 134 | The Black Scab in Potatoes Order (No. 2) (Northern Ireland) 1932 |
| No. 135 | The Planning and Housing (County Court) Rules (Northern Ireland) 1932 |
| No. 136 | The Public Health (Preservatives, etc. in Food) Amendment Regulations (Northern Ireland) 1932 |
| No. 137 | |
| No. 138 | The Education (Representatives on School Management Committees) Regulations (Northern Ireland) 1932 |
| No. 139 | The Ancient Monuments Order (Northern Ireland) 1932 |
| No. 140 | The Company: Appointed day Order (Northern Ireland) 1932 |

== See also ==
- List of statutory rules of Northern Ireland
