= National Insurance Act 1946 =

Act of the Parliament of the United Kingdom

National Insurance Act 1946 (Note: Section 80(1).)
- Act of Parliament
- Parliament of the United Kingdom
- Long title: An Act to establish an extended system of national insurance providing pecuniary payments by way of unemployment benefit, sickness benefit, maternity benefit, retirement pension, widows' benefit, guardian's allowance and death grant, to repeal or amend the existing enactments relating to unemployment insurance, national health insurance, widows', orphans' and old age contributory pensions and non-contributory old age pensions, to provide for the making of payments towards the cost of a national health service, and for purposes connected with the matters aforesaid.
- Citation: 9 & 10 Geo. 6. c. 67
- Introduced by: Labour Party (UK) (Commons)
- Territorial extent: England and Wales; Scotland; (Note: Section 80(2).)

Dates
- Royal assent: 1 August 1946
- Commencement: 23 January 1948 (Note: Section 73(1). The National Insurance Act 1946 (Appointed Day) Order 1948 (SI 1948/54).)
- Repealed: 6 April 1975 (Note: The Social Security Act 1973 (Commencement No. 3) Order 1974 (SI 1974/164).)
Other legislation
Repeals/revokes	Widows', Orphans' and Old Age Contributory Pensions Act 1936
Amended by	National Assistance Act 1948; Companies Act 1948; National Insurance Act 1949; Income Tax Act 1952; Statute Law Revision Act 1953; Wages Councils Act 1959
Repealed by	Statute Law Revision (Consequential Repeals) Act 1965; Social Security Act 1973

Status: Repealed

Text of statute as originally enacted

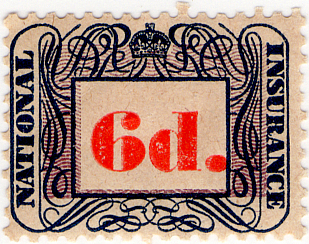
A British 1948 National Insurance stamp, once used to collect contributions to the scheme.

The National Insurance Act 1946 (9 & 10 Geo. 6. c. 67) was an act of the Parliament of the United Kingdom passed during the Attlee ministry which established a comprehensive system of social security throughout the United Kingdom.

The act meant that all who were of working age were to pay a weekly contribution. If they had been paying National Insurance, mothers were to be entitled to an allowance (of 18 weeks) for each child as well as a lump sum when the child was born. The act however excluded married women. The weekly contributions meant that benefits including sickness benefit and unemployment benefits were able to be offered. Pensions were to be offered to men and women at ages 65 and 60 respectively.

== Background ==
Attlee had campaigned hard in his campaign leading up to the 1945 election for the creation of the welfare state. When elected, he and his administration adopted proposals of the Beveridge Report of 1942 to keep to his manifesto promise.

== Significance ==
According to the historian Kenneth O. Morgan, the act constituted "a measure which provided a comprehensive universal basis for insurance provision that had hitherto been unknown".

== Subsequent developments ==
The whole act except sections 6(4), 55, 68, 70, 74 and 79 and schedule 11, section 70 so far as it applies to Great Britain, and in section 79, paragraphs (a) to (i) and (k), were repealed by section 1(1) of, and the schedule to, the Statute Law Revision (Consequential Repeals) Act 1965, which came into force on 6 September 1965.

The whole act, so far as unrepealed, was repealed by section 100(2)(b) of, and part I of schedule 28 to, the Social Security Act 1973, which came into force on 6 April 1975.

== See also ==
- UK labour law
- Welfare state
- National Insurance Act 1911
- Social Security Contributions and Benefits Act 1992
- Timeline of pensions in the United Kingdom
