= List of statutory rules and orders of Northern Ireland, 1935 =

This is an incomplete list of statutory rules and orders of Northern Ireland during 1935. Statutory rules and orders were the predecessor of statutory rules and they formed the secondary legislation of Northern Ireland between 1922 and 1973.

Number	Title
No. 1 & 2	
No. 3	The Gas: Rate of Payment to Ministry of Commerce Order (Northern Ireland) 1935
No. 4	
No. 5	The Marketing of Pigs (Returns) Order (Northern Ireland) 1935
No. 6 - 8	
No. 9	The Unemployment Assistance (Appeal Tribunals) Rules (Northern Ireland) 1935
No. 10	The Unemployment Assistance (Periods of Occasional Sickness) Rules (Northern Ireland) 1935
No. 11	The Unemployment Assistance (Residence Qualification) Rules (Northern Ireland) 1935
No. 12	The Local Authorities (Abatement of Grants) Regulations (Northern Ireland) 1935
No. 13	The Dangerous Drugs (Consolidation) (Amendment) Regulations (Northern Ireland) 1935
No. 14	The Unemployment Assistance (Determinations) Rules (Northern Ireland) 1935
No. 15	The Unemployment Assistance (Transitory Provisions) Rules (Northern Ireland) 1935
No. 16	The Unemployment Assistance (Allowances) Rules (Northern Ireland) 1935
No. 17	The Pigs Marketing (Payment of Contribution or Levy) Regulations (Northern Ireland) 1935
No. 18	The Marketing of Pigs (Form of Curers' Returns) (No. 1) Regulations (Northern Ireland) 1935
No. 19	The Valuation: Appointed Days Order (Northern Ireland) 1935
No. 20	The General Revaluation Regulations (Northern Ireland) 1935
No. 21	The Annual Revision of Valuation Regulations (Northern Ireland) 1935
No. 22	The Public Service Vehicles and Goods Vehicles (Drivers' Hours of Duty) Regulations (Northern Ireland) 1935
No. 23	The Milk (Grade A) Regulations (Northern Ireland) 1935
No. 24	The Milk (Grade B) Regulations (Northern Ireland) 1935
No. 25	The Milk (Grade C) Regulations (Northern Ireland) 1935
No. 26	
No. 27	The Royal Ulster Constabulary Reward Fund Regulations (Northern Ireland) 1935
No. 28	The Motor Cars (Speed) Regulations (Northern Ireland) 1935
No. 29	The Unemployment Act (Northern Ireland) 1934 (Appointed Days) Amending Order (Northern Ireland) 1935
No. 30	
No. 31	The Diseases of Animals: Dairy Cattle Order (Northern Ireland) 1935
No. 32	The Pig Industry Council (Term of Office) Order (Northern Ireland) 1935
No. 33	The Bacon Marketing Scheme (Amendment) Order (Northern Ireland) 1935
No. 34	The Marketing of Pigs (Form of Curer's Returns) (No. 2) Regulations (Northern Ireland) 1935
No. 35	The Pigs Marketing (Special Levy) (No. 1) Order (Northern Ireland) 1935
No. 36	
No. 37	The Road Vehicles Lighting Regulations (Northern Ireland) 1935
No. 38	The County Court Service: Appointment of Registrars Regulations (Northern Ireland) 1935
No. 39	The Bovine Tuberculosis Order (Northern Ireland) 1935
No. 40	The Workmen's Compensation (Medical Referees) Regulations (Northern Ireland) 1935
No. 41	The Workmen's Compensation (Medical Referees) Order (Northern Ireland) 1935
No. 42	The Workmen's Compensation (Certifying Surgeons) Rules (Northern Ireland) 1935
No. 43	The Electricity Board for Northern Ireland BorRecording (Amendment) Regulations (Northern Ireland) 1935
No. 44	
No. 45	The Secondary School Examinations Regulations (Northern Ireland) 1935
No. 46	The Wild Birds Protection: Protected Birds Order (Northern Ireland) 1935
No. 47	The Secondary Teachers Regulations (Northern Ireland) 1935
No. 48	
No. 49	The Roads Improvement Regulations (Northern Ireland) 1935
No. 50	The Pigs Marketing Scheme (Amendment) Order (Northern Ireland) 1935
No. 51	The Pigs Marketing (Special Levy) (No. 2) Order (Northern Ireland) 1935
No. 52	The Anthrax Prevention: Importation of Goat Hair Order (Northern Ireland) 1935
No. 53	The Cellulose Solutions Regulations (Northern Ireland) 1935
No. 54	
No. 55	The Poisons Order (Northern Ireland) 1935
No. 56	The General Cattle Diseases Fund (Amending) Regulations (Northern Ireland) 1935
No. 57	The Unemployment Insurance (Insurance Industry Special Scheme) (Variation and Amendment) Special Order (Northern Ireland) 1935
No. 58	The Electricity Special Orders, &c., Rules (Northern Ireland) 1935
No. 59	
No. 60	The Pigs Marketing (Northern Ireland) (Special Levy) (No. 3) Order (Northern Ireland) 1935
No. 61	The Milk (Grade B) (Amendment) Regulations (Northern Ireland) 1935
No. 62	The Milk (Grade C) (Amendment) Regulations (Northern Ireland) 1935
No. 63	The Pig Marketing: Appointed Days Order (Northern Ireland) 1935
No. 64	
No. 65	The Dangerous Drugs: Appointed Day Order (Northern Ireland) 1935
No. 66	The Dairies, Cowsheds and Milk-Shops Order (Northern Ireland) 1935
No. 67	The Workmen's Compensation (Transfer of Funds) Rules (Northern Ireland) 1935
No. 68	The National Health Insurance Medical Benefit (Amendment) Regulations (Northern Ireland) 1935
No. 69	The Public Elementary Schools' Regulations, 1935, Amending Regulations, No. 1 (Northern Ireland) 1935
No. 70	The Technical Teachers, 1932, Amending Regulations, No. 2 (Northern Ireland) 1935
No. 71	The Urban District Councils and Borough Councils (Officers Qualifications) Order (Northern Ireland) 1935
No. 72	The Unions and Rural District Councils (Officers Qualifications) Order (Northern Ireland) 1935
No. 73	
No. 74	The Pigs Marketing Scheme (Amendment) (No. 2) Order (Northern Ireland) 1935
No. 75	The Pigs Marketing (Northern Ireland) (Special Levy) (No. 4) Order (Northern Ireland) 1935
No. 76	The Secondary School Grants Regulations (Northern Ireland) 1935
No. 77	The Workmen's Compensation (Industrial Diseases) Order (Northern Ireland) 1935
No. 78	The Marketing of Potatoes Rules (Northern Ireland) 1935
No. 79	
No. 80	The Unemployment Assistance (Transitory Provisions) (No. 2) Rules (Northern Ireland) 1935
No. 81	The Workmen's Compensation (Aircraft) Order (Northern Ireland) 1935
No. 82	
No. 83	The Unemployment Insurance (Inconsiderable Employments) (Persons under Sixteen) (Revocation) Regulations (Northern Ireland) 1935
No. 84	
No. 85	The Pigs Marketing (Special Levy) (No. 5) Order (Northern Ireland) 1935
No. 86	The Black Scab in Potatoes Order (Northern Ireland) 1935
No. 87	The Importation of Elm Trees and Conifers (Prohibition) (Amendment) Order (Northern Ireland) 1935
No. 88	The Royal Ulster Constabulary Pay (Amending) (No. 1) Order (Northern Ireland) 1935
No. 89	The Royal Ulster Constabulary Pay (Amending) (No. 2) Order (Northern Ireland) 1935
No. 90	The Royal Ulster Constabulary Allowances (Consolidation) (Amending) Order (Northern Ireland) 1935
No. 91	The Local Carriers Regulations (Northern Ireland) 1935
No. 92	The Road Vehicles Lighting Regulations (Northern Ireland) 1935
No. 93	The Pigs Marketing (Payment of Contribution or Levy) (No. 2) Regulations (Northern Ireland) 1935
No. 94	The Pigs Marketing (Special Levy) (No. 6) Order (Northern Ireland) 1935
No. 95	
No. 96	The Land Purchase Sinking Fund Regulations (Northern Ireland) 1935
No. 97	The Local Government: Rural Districts invested with Urban Powers Order (Northern Ireland) 1935
No. 98	The Intoxicating Liquor: Licences: Rates of Charges Order (Northern Ireland) 1935
No. 99	
No. 100	The National Health Insurance and Contributory Pensions (Enactments) Order (Northern Ireland) 1935
No. 101	The Road Vehicles (Registration and Licensing) (Amendment) Regulations (Northern Ireland) 1935
No. 102	The Milk (Grade B) (Amendment No. 2) Regulations (Northern Ireland) 1935
No. 103 & 104	
No. 105	The Pigs Marketing (Special Levy) (No. 7) Order (Northern Ireland) 1935
No. 106	The Sheep Dipping (Special Regulation) Order (Northern Ireland) 1935
No. 107	
No. 108	The Unemployment Insurance (Anomalies) (Seasonal Workers) Order (Northern Ireland) 1935
No. 109	
No. 110	The County Borough Councils (Town Clerks and Deputy Town Clerks Qualifications) Order (Northern Ireland) 1935
No. 111	The Local Government (County Court) Rules (Northern Ireland) 1935
No. 112	The Pigs Marketing (Special Levy) (No. 8) Order (Northern Ireland) 1935
No. 113	The Malone Training School (Contributions) Order (Northern Ireland) 1935
No. 114 - 116	
No. 117	The Marketing of Eggs (Amendment) Rules (Northern Ireland) 1935
No. 118	
No. 119	The Joint Milk Council (Election of Members by Producers) Regulations (Northern Ireland) 1935
No. 120	The Joint Milk Council (Election of Members by Distributors) Regulations (Northern Ireland) 1935
No. 121 - 123	
No. 124	The Factories and Workshops (First-aid) Order (Northern Ireland) 1935
No. 125	
No. 126	The Pigs Marketing (Additional Licence Fee) Regulations (Northern Ireland) 1935
No. 127	
No. 128	The Slaughtered Animals (Compensation) Act (Northern Ireland) 1928 (Suspension of Charges) Order (Northern Ireland) 1935
No. 129	The Pigs Marketing (Special Levy) (No. 9) Order (Northern Ireland) 1935
No. 130	The Unemployment Insurance (Increase of Benefit in Respect of Dependent Children) Order (Northern Ireland) 1935
No. 131 & 132	
No. 133	The Unemployment Insurance (Crediting of Contributions) Regulations (Northern Ireland) 1935
No. 134	The Summary Proceedings (Form of Affidavit of Service) Order (Northern Ireland) 1935
No. 135	The Summary Proceedings: Appointed Days Order (Northern Ireland) 1935
No. 136	The Summary Proceedings: Appointed Day Order (Northern Ireland) 1935
No. 137	The Unemployment Assistance Fund Regulations (Northern Ireland) 1935
No. 138	
No. 139	The Unemployment Insurance (Insurance Industry Special Scheme) (Variation and Amendment) Order (Northern Ireland) 1935
No. 140	The Marketing of Fruit Rules (Northern Ireland) 1935
No. 141	The Parliamentary Grant (Education Authorities) Regulations (Northern Ireland) 1935
No. 142	The Dispensary Medical Officers and Medical Officers of Health in Rural Districts Qualifications Order (Northern Ireland) 1935
No. 143	The Technical Teachers 1932 Amending Regulations No. 3 (Northern Ireland) 1935
No. 144	The Appointment and Dismissal of Officers: Education Authorities Regulations (Northern Ireland) 1935
No. 145	The Northern Ireland Transport Stock Regulations (Northern Ireland) 1935
No. 146	The Pigs Marketing (Special Levy) (No. 10) Order (Northern Ireland) 1935
No. 147	The Pig Marketing: Appointed Day Order (Northern Ireland) 1935
No. 148	The Dangerous Occurrences Notification Order (Northern Ireland) 1935
No. 149	
No. 150	The Marketing of Fruit Rules (Northern Ireland) 1935
No. 151	The Road and Railway Transport (Pooling of Receipts) Order (Northern Ireland) 1935
No. 152	The Census of Production Rules (Northern Ireland) 1935
No. 153	The Pigs Marketing (Grading) Order (Northern Ireland) 1935
No. 154	
No. 155	The Black Scab in Potatoes Order (No. 2) (Northern Ireland) 1935
No. 156	
No. 157	The Importation of Plants (Amendment) Order (Northern Ireland) 1935

== See also ==
- List of statutory rules of Northern Ireland
