= List of statutory rules and orders of Northern Ireland, 1931 =

This is an incomplete list of statutory rules and orders of Northern Ireland during 1930. Statutory rules and orders were the predecessor of statutory rules and they formed the secondary legislation of Northern Ireland between 1922 and 1973.

Number	Title
No. 1	
No. 2	The Gas: Rate of Payment Order (Northern Ireland) 1931
No. 3 & 4	
No. 5	The Measuring Instruments (Liquid Fuel and Lubricating Oil) Regulations (Northern Ireland) 1931
No. 6	The Potatoes Importation Order (Northern Ireland) 1931
No. 7	The Portal Inspection Order (Northern Ireland) 1931
No. 8	The Sale of Milk Rules (Northern Ireland) 1931
No.9	
No. 10	The Aldermen and Councillors of Boroughs Election Order (Northern Ireland) 1931
No. 11	The Aldermen and Councillors of County Boroughs Election Order (Northern Ireland) 1931
No. 12	The County and Rural District Councillors Election Order (Northern Ireland) 1931
No. 13	The Guardians Election Order (Northern Ireland) 1931
No. 14	The Urban District Councillors and Town Commissioners Election Order (Northern Ireland) 1931
No. 15	The Animals Disinfection Order (Northern Ireland) 1931
No. 16	The Fisheries: Net Fishing in Belfast Lough By-Laws (Northern Ireland) 1931
No. 17 & 18	
No. 19	The Parliamentary Elections: Returning Officers' Charges Regulations (Northern Ireland) 1931
No. 20	The Pension Increase Regulations (Northern Ireland) 1931
No. 21	The Workmen's Compensation Amendment Rules (Northern Ireland) 1931
No. 22	The Building and Improvement Grants (Voluntary Schools) Amendment Regulations No. 1 (Northern Ireland) 1931
No. 23	The Marketing of Dairy Produce (Surprise Inspections of Butter) Rules (Northern Ireland) 1931
No. 24	The Cinematograph Regulations (Northern Ireland) 1931
No. 25	The Salaries and Capitation Grants (Public Elementary Schools) Interim Regulations (Northern Ireland) 1931
No. 26	The Reserve Fund (Capital Liabilities) Regulations (Northern Ireland) 1931
No. 27	
No. 28	The Measuring Instruments (Liquid Fuel and Lubricating Oil) Additional Regulations (Northern Ireland) 1931
No. 29	The Heavy Motor Car (Amendment) Order (Northern Ireland) 1931
No. 30	The Measuring Instruments (Liquid Fuel and Lubricating Oil) Verification and Stamping Fees Order (Northern Ireland) 1931
No. 31 - 34	
No. 35	The Roads Improvement (County Court) Rules (Northern Ireland) 1931
No. 36	
No. 37	The Criminal Appeal Act Rules (Northern Ireland) 1931
No. 38	
No. 39	The Swine Fever (Belfast) Order (Northern Ireland) 1931
No. 40	The Agricultural Produce (Meat Regulations) Rules (Northern Ireland) 1931
No. 41 & 42	
No. 43	The Ulster Savings Certificates (Amendment) Regulations (Northern Ireland) 1931
No. 44	The Royal Ulster Constabulary Pay (Amendment) Order (Northern Ireland) 1931
No. 45	The Royal Ulster Constabulary Allowances (Consolidation) (Amendment) Order (Northern Ireland) 1931
No. 46	The Dangerous Drugs (Consolidation) Amendment Regulations (Northern Ireland) 1931
No. 47	The Colorado Beetle Order (Northern Ireland) 1931
No. 48	The Peat Moss Litter (Prohibition) Order (Northern Ireland) 1931
No. 49	
No. 50	The King's Scholarship Examination Regulations (Northern Ireland) 1931
No. 51	
No. 52	The Secondary School Grants Amendment Regulations No. 1 (Northern Ireland) 1931
No. 53	The Secondary Teachers Amendment Regulations No. 2 (Northern Ireland) 1931
No. 52	The Secondary School Grants Amendment Regulations No. 1 (Northern Ireland) 1931
No. 53	The Secondary Teachers Amendment Regulations No. 2 (Northern Ireland) 1931
No. 54	The Public Service Vehicles (Amendment) Regulations (Northern Ireland) 1931
No. 55	The Local Government (Closing of Roads) Regulations (Northern Ireland) 1931
No. 56 - 58	
No. 59	The Foreign Hay and Straw (Ireland) Amendment Order (Northern Ireland) 1931
No. 60	The Dangerous Drugs (Consolidation) Amendment Regulations (Northern Ireland) 1931
No. 61	Foreign Animals (Northern Ireland) Order 1931
No. 62 - 76	
No. 77	The Technical School Examinations Regulations (Northern Ireland) 1931
No. 78 - 81	
No. 82	The Constabulary (Acquisition of Land) (County Court) Rules (Northern Ireland) 1931
No. 83	The Marketing of Dairy Produce (County Court) Rules (Northern Ireland) 1931
No. 84	The Secondary School Examinations Regulations (Northern Ireland) 1931
No. 85	The Unlawful Associations Regulations (Northern Ireland) 1931
No. 86 & 87	
No. 88	The Intoxicating Liquor: Licences, Rates of Charges Order (Northern Ireland) 1931
No. 89	The Unemployment Insurance (Insurance Year) Regulations (Northern Ireland) 1931
No. 90	The National Health Insurance and Contributory Pensions (Collection of Contribs.) Amendment Regulations (Northern Ireland) 1931
No. 91	The Marketing of Eggs Rules (Northern Ireland) 1931
No. 92	The Poor Law: Medical Relief Tickets Order (Northern Ireland) 1931
No. 93	The Public Health (Preservatives, etc. in Food) Amendment Regulations (Northern Ireland) 1931
No. 94	The Marketing of Dairy Produce (Amendment) Rules (Northern Ireland) 1931
No. 95	The Agricultural Teachers Amendment Regulations No. 2 (Northern Ireland) 1931
No. 96 & 97	
No. 98	The Technical Teachers Amendment Regulations No. 7 (Northern Ireland) 1931
No. 99	The Treasury Bill Regulations (Northern Ireland) 1931
No. 100 & 101	
No. 102	The Evening Elementary Schools Interim Regulations (Northern Ireland) 1931
No. 103	The Extra and Special Subjects (Public Elementary Schools) Interim Regulations (Northern Ireland) 1931
No. 104	The Pupil Teachers and Monitors Interim Regulations (Northern Ireland) 1931
No. 105	The Salaries and Capitation Grants (Public Elementary Schools) Interim Amendment Regulations (No. 1) (Northern Ireland) 1931
No. 106 & 107	
No. 108	The Marketing of Fruit Rules (Northern Ireland) 1931
No. 109 - 111	
No. 112	The Malone Training School Regulations (Northern Ireland) 1931
No. 113	The Public Service Vehicles (Amendment) (No. 2) Regulations (Northern Ireland) 1931
No. 114	The Advertisements Regulation (Publication of Byelaws) Order (Northern Ireland) 1931
No. 115	The Drainage: Apptd.day Order (Northern Ireland) 1931
No. 116	The Haypark Special School Committee Order (Northern Ireland) 1931
No. 117	The Unemployment Insurance (Transitional Payments) Regulations (Northern Ireland) 1931
No. 118	The Unemployment Insurance (Anomalies) Regulations (Northern Ireland) 1931
No. 119	The Unlawful Associations Regulations (Northern Ireland) 1931
No. 120	The Military Exercise and Drill Order (Northern Ireland) 1931
No. 121	
No. 122	The Bovine Tuberculosis Amendment Order (Northern Ireland) 1931
No. 123	
No. 124	The Motor Cars (Use and Construction) (Amendment) Order (Northern Ireland) 1931
No. 125	The Housing (Form of Orders and Notices) Regulations (Northern Ireland) 1931
No. 126	The Planning Schemes (Procedure) Regulations (Northern Ireland) 1931
No. 127	The National Health Insurance (Insurance Practitioners' and Pharmaceutical Committees) Amendment Regulations (Northern Ireland) 1931
No. 128	
No. 129	The Planning Schemes (Determination of Questions as to Compensation) Rules (Northern Ireland) 1931
No. 130	The Contributory Pensions (Oversea Claims) Regulations (Northern Ireland) 1931
No. 131	The National Health Insurance (Duration of Insurance) Regulations (Northern Ireland) 1931
No. 132 - 134	
No. 135	The Marketing of Fruit No. 2 Rules (Northern Ireland) 1931
No. 136	
No. 137	The Heavy Motor Car (Speed) (Amendment) Order (Northern Ireland) 1931
No. 138	The Unemployment Insurance (Insurance Industry Special Scheme) (Variation and Amendment) Special Order (Northern Ireland) 1931
No. 139	The Agricultural Produce (Meat Regulation) Rules No. 2 (Northern Ireland) 1931
No. 140	The National Health Insurance (Subsidiary Employments) Order (Northern Ireland) 1931
No. 141	The National Health Insurance (Medical Benefit Council) Amendment) Regulations (Northern Ireland) 1931
No. 142	The Northern Ireland Electricity Board BorRecording Regulations (Northern Ireland) 1931
No. 143	The Unemployment Insurance (Insurance Industry Special Scheme) (Amendment) Special Order (Northern Ireland) 1931
No. 144	The Electric Lighting (Clauses) Act 1899 (Application to Electricity Board for Northern Ireland) Regulations (Northern Ireland) 1931
No. 145	The National Health Insurance (Reserve and Transfer Values) Amendment Regulations (Northern Ireland) 1931
No. 146	The National Health Insurance Transitional Amendment Regulations (Northern Ireland) 1931
No. 147	The Education (School Attendance) Regulations (Northern Ireland) 1931
No. 148	The Contributory Pensions (Patients of Unsound Mind) Regulations (Northern Ireland) 1931
No. 149	The Unemployment Insurance (Economy) (No. 1) Order (Northern Ireland) 1931
No. 150	The Unemployment Insurance (Economy) (No. 2) Order (Northern Ireland) 1931
No. 151	The Unemployment Insurance (Economy) (No. 3) Order (Northern Ireland) 1931
No. 152	The Economy (National Health Insurance) Order (Northern Ireland) 1931

== See also ==
- List of statutory rules of Northern Ireland
